= 2020–21 FC CSKA 1948 Sofia season =

CSKA 1948
2020–21 season
- Chairman: Dobrin Gyonov
- Manager: Krasimir Balakov (until 30 August 2020); Yordan Yurukov (until 23 September 2020); Krasimir Petrov (until 18 March 2021); Atanas Bornosuzov (interim) (until 23 March 2021); Rosen Kirilov (until 24 April 2021); Todor Kiselichkov (interim) (from 23 April 2021)
- First League: 5th
- Bulgarian Cup: Quarter-final
Home colours	Away colours	Third colours

The 2020–21 season is CSKA 1948's first season in the Bulgarian First League, following three promotions in four seasons. They will also take part in the Bulgarian Cup.

== Players ==
=== Squad stats ===
No.	Pos	Nat	Player	Total		First League		Bulgarian Cup	
No.	Pos	Nat	Player	Apps	Goals	Apps	Goals	Apps	Goals
1	GK	(Bulgaria) BUL	Dimitar Todorov	2	0	0	0	2	0
3	DF	(Bulgaria) BUL	Dimitar Pirgov	27	0	22+2	0	2+1	0
4	DF	(Bulgaria) BUL	Angel Lyaskov	13	0	10+1	0	2	0
5	DF	(Bulgaria) BUL	Mihail Minkov	12	0	4+7	0	1	0
7	MF	(Bulgaria) BUL	Mario Topuzov	28	1	14+12	1	1+1	0
8	MF	(Bulgaria) BUL	Ivaylo Klimentov	14	0	7+7	0	0	0
9	FW	(Bulgaria) BUL	Dimitar Mitkov	12	1	5+5	0	1+1	1
10	MF	(Bulgaria) BUL	Vasil Shopov	25	4	19+3	3	3	1
11	FW	(Bulgaria) BUL	Denislav Aleksandrov	25	4	19+3	3	2+1	1
12	GK	(Bulgaria) BUL	Nikola Videnov	1	0	1	0	0	0
14	DF	(Bulgaria) BUL	Dimitar Savov	5	0	4+1	0	0	0
18	MF	(Bulgaria) BUL	Ivaylo Chochev	18	4	13+3	3	2	1
19	DF	(Bulgaria) BUL	Georgi Gospodinov	3	0	2	0	1	0
20	FW	(Bulgaria) BUL	Angel Bastunov	33	6	15+15	4	2+1	2
21	DF	(Bulgaria) BUL	Ventsislav Vasilev	24	0	18+4	0	2	0
22	MF	(Bulgaria) BUL	Dragomir Radev	1	0	0	0	0+1	0
23	MF	(Bulgaria) BUL	Viktor Zorov	0	0	0	0	0	0
24	DF	(Bulgaria) BUL	Lazar Marin	26	0	22+3	0	1	0
25	DF	(Bulgaria) BUL	Sasho Aleksandrov	28	0	25	0	2+1	0
26	MF	(Bulgaria) BUL	Serkan Yusein	19	0	18	0	1	0
27	MF	(Bulgaria) BUL	Borislav Damyanov	8	0	3+4	0	1	0
28	MF	(Bulgaria) BUL	Emanuil Lichev	6	0	2+4	0	0	0
29	GK	(Bulgaria) BUL	Daniel Naumov	31	-35	30	-34	1	-1
31	MF	(Bulgaria) BUL	Georgi Yurukov	1	0	0	0	0+1	0
33	MF	(Bulgaria) BUL	Galin Ivanov	23	8	20+2	8	1	0
39	FW	(Bulgaria) BUL	Iliya Petkov	0	0	0	0	0	0
70	FW	(Bulgaria) BUL	Georgi Rusev	25	6	20+3	6	0+2	0
71	DF	(Bulgaria) BUL	Aleksandar Georgiev	1	0	0+1	0	0	0
87	DF	(Bulgaria) BUL	Simeon Petrov	19	0	15+3	0	1	0
88	MF	(Bulgaria) BUL	Martin Haydarov	9	0	4+5	0	0	0
90	MF	(Bulgaria) BUL	Kristiyan Nikolov	2	0	0+1	0	0+1	0
90	FW	(Bulgaria) BUL	Nikolay Ganchev	5	0	0+4	0	1	0
91	FW	(Bulgaria) BUL	Stefan Statev	0	0	0	0	0	0
Players sold or loaned out after the start of the season:
9	FW	(Bulgaria) BUL	Martin Kamburov	15	8	14+1	8	0	0
13	MF	(Bulgaria) BUL	Georgi Mariyanov	2	0	1+1	0	0	0
17	FW	(Bulgaria) BUL	Daniel Mladenov	14	1	6+7	1	1	0
19	MF	(Bulgaria) BUL	Mihael Orachev	3	0	1+1	0	1	0
30	DF	(Bulgaria) BUL	Dimo Atanasov	3	0	3	0	0	0
91	FW	(Bulgaria) BUL	Tsvetomir Todorov	1	0	0+1	0	0	0
99	FW	(Bulgaria) BUL	Andon Gushterov	11	1	4+6	0	1	1

As of 26 May 2021

== Players in/out ==
=== Summer transfers ===
In:

No.	Pos.	Nation	Player
3	DF	BUL	Dimitar Pirgov (from Botev Plovdiv)
7	MF	BUL	Mario Topuzov (from Septemvri Simitli)
9	FW	BUL	Martin Kamburov (from Beroe)
13	MF	BUL	Georgi Mariyanov (from Litex)
14	DF	BUL	Dimitar Savov (from Minyor Pernik)
18	MF	BUL	Ivaylo Chochev (from Pescara)
20	MF	BUL	Angel Bastunov (from Kariana)
24	DF	BUL	Lazar Marin (from Botev Plovdiv)
26	MF	BUL	Serkan Yusein (from Ludogorets)
33	MF	BUL	Galin Ivanov (from Slavia)
70	FW	BUL	Georgi Rusev (from Septemvri)
87	DF	BUL	Simeon Petrov (from Strumska Slava)
91	MF	BUL	Tsvetomir Todorov (from Strumska Slava)

Out:

No.	Pos.	Nation	Player
6	DF	BUL	Denislav Mitsakov (to Strumska Slava)
7	MF	BUL	Boris Tyutyukov (to Litex)
9	MF	BUL	Kristiyan Peshov (to Septemvri Sofia)
13	DF	BUL	Kristian Nikolov (to Sportist Svoge)
13	MF	BUL	Georgi Mariyanov (on loan to Strumska Slava)
14	DF	BUL	Ivaylo Todorov (to Hebar)
20	MF	BUL	Yanko Sandanski (to Vitosha Bistritsa)
27	MF	BUL	Milko Georgiev (to Oborishte)
30	DF	BUL	Dimo Atanasov (released)
71	DF	BUL	Aleksandar Georgiev (on loan to Strumska Slava)
88	MF	BUL	Slavcho Shokolarov (to Botev Plovdiv)
91	MF	BUL	Tsvetomir Todorov (released)
98	FW	BUL	Valentin Yoskov (on loan to Etar)

=== Winter transfers ===
In: Note: Flags indicate national team as defined under FIFA eligibility rules; some limited exceptions apply. Players may hold more than one non-FIFA nationality.

No.	Pos.	Nation	Player
4	DF	BUL	Angel Lyaskov (from Olimpija Ljubljana)
9	FW	BUL	Dimitar Mitkov (on loan from Ludogorets)
19	DF	BUL	Georgi Gospodinov (from Botev Plovdiv)
27	MF	BUL	Borislav Damyanov (from Kariana)
28	MF	BUL	Emanuil Lichev (from Kariana)
88	MF	BUL	Martin Haydarov (from Levski)
90	FW	BUL	Nikolay Ganchev (from Marek)
91	FW	BUL	Stefan Statev (from Ascoli)

Out: Note: Flags indicate national team as defined under FIFA eligibility rules; some limited exceptions apply. Players may hold more than one non-FIFA nationality.

No.	Pos.	Nation	Player
9	FW	BUL	Martin Kamburov (to Beroe)
17	DF	BUL	Daniel Mladenov (to Etar)
19	MF	BUL	Mihael Orachev (to Montana)
98	FW	BUL	Valentin Yoskov (to Sportist Svoge, previously on loan to Etar)
99	DF	BUL	Andon Gushterov (to Pirin)
--	DF	BUL	Filip Angelov (to Slavia Sofia)

== Matches ==
=== First League ===
==== Table ====
Pos	Team	Pld	W	D	L	GF	GA	GD	Pts	Qualification
3	CSKA Sofia	26	14	8	4	39	20	+19	50	Qualification for the Championship group
4	Arda	26	12	9	5	36	29	+7	45	Qualification for the Championship group
5	CSKA 1948	26	10	8	8	34	30	+4	38	Qualification for the Championship group
6	Beroe	26	10	7	9	38	28	+10	37 (Note: Head-to-head points (GD): Beroe 3 (+3), Cherno More 3 (-3).)	Qualification for the Championship group
7	Cherno More	26	10	7	9	27	25	+2	37	Qualification for the Europa Conference League group

Source: Soccerway, Bulgarian Football
Rules for classification: 1) Points; 2) Head-to-head points; 3) Head-to-head goal difference; 4) Head-to-head goals scored; 5) Head-to-head away goals scored (only if two teams); 6) Goal difference; 7) Goals scored; 8) Fairplay ranking; 9) Draw.
Notes:

Pos	Team	Pld	W	D	L	GF	GA	GD	Pts	Qualification	LUD	LPD	CSS	ARD	CSK	BSZ
1	Ludogorets Razgrad (C)	31	22	4	5	69	29	+40	70	Qualification for the Champions League first qualifying round	—	1–2	—	4–1	—	3–1
2	Lokomotiv Plovdiv	31	17	10	4	48	23	+25	61	Qualification for the Europa Conference League second qualifying round (Note: CSKA Sofia qualified for the Europa Conference League second qualifying round by winning the 2020–21 Bulgarian Cup.)	—	—	2–0	—	0–0	0–0
3	CSKA Sofia	31	17	8	6	46	24	+22	59	Qualification for the Europa Conference League second qualifying round	4–1	—	—	1–0	—	2–0
4	Arda (O)	31	13	11	7	42	37	+5	50	Qualification for the Europa Conference League play-off	—	3–3	—	—	0–0	—
5	CSKA 1948	31	12	11	8	41	34	+7	47		3–1	—	1–0	—	—	—
6	Beroe	31	10	9	12	42	38	+4	39		—	—	—	0–2	3–3	—

Source: Soccerway
Legend: Blue = home team win; Yellow = draw; Red = away team win.
Rules for classification: 1) Points; 2) Head-to-head points; 3) Head-to-head goal difference; 4) Head-to-head goals scored; 5) Head-to-head away goals scored (only if two teams); 6) Goal difference; 7) Goals scored; 8) Fairplay ranking; 9) Draw.
(C) Champions; (O) Play-off winners

==== Fixtures and results ====
7 August 2020 1	CSKA 1948	2−2	CSKA	Sofia
20:00 UTC+3	Kamburov 18'; Mladenov 33'; Shopov (yellow card) 49'; S. Aleksandrov (yellow card) 53'; Atanasov (yellow card) 56'; Vasilev (yellow card) 89'; Topuzov (yellow card) 90+2'	Report	Antov 45+4'; Sowe 52'	Stadium: Natsionalen stadion Vasil Levski; Attendance: 1,500; Referee: Stanislav Todorov (Shumen); Man of the Match: Martin Kamburov
Note: On 9 July 2020 the Ministry of Health announced that the stadiums are not allowed to host spectators due to a recent spike of COVID-19-related infections in Bulgaria. On 31 July 2020 the Ministry for Sport and Youth confirmed the extension of these provisions until 31 August 2020. Yet, on 5 August 2020 the Ministry for Sport and Youth reversed its decision by allowing stadiums to host up to 50% of its capacity, but no more than 1,000 spectators per block.

17 August 2020 2	Beroe	0−0	CSKA 1948	Stara Zagora
20:00 UTC+3	Stoyanov (yellow card) 60'	Report	Klimentov (yellow card) 22'; Pirgov (yellow card) 39'; Mladenov (yellow card) 45'; Shopov (yellow card) 53'; Topuzov (yellow card) 78'; Atanasov (yellow card) 85'; Naumov (yellow card) 89'	Stadium: Stadion Beroe; Attendance: 2,000; Referee: Stanimir Trenchev (Sofia); Man of the Match: Daniel Naumov
Note: According to a regulation, issued on 5 August 2020 by the Ministry for Sport and Youth, stadiums are allowed to host up to 50% of its capacity, but no more than 1,000 spectators per block.

24 August 2020 3	CSKA 1948	0−2	Arda	Sofia
21:00 UTC+3	Ivanov (yellow card) 23'; Vasilev (yellow card) 55'; Pirgov (yellow card) 67'	Report	Delev 14'; Leoni (yellow card) 57'; Kokonov 59'; Simeonov (yellow card) 75'; Aleksandrov (yellow card) 88'	Stadium: Natsionalen stadion Vasil Levski; Attendance: 100; Referee: Radoslav Gidzhenov (Plovdiv); Man of the Match: Ivan Kokonov
Note: According to a regulation, issued on 5 August 2020 by the Ministry for Sport and Youth, stadiums are allowed to host up to 50% of its capacity, but no more than 1,000 spectators per block.

28 August 2020 4	Tsarsko Selo	0−0	CSKA 1948	Sofia
18:45 UTC+3		Report		Stadium: Sporten kompleks Tsarsko Selo; Attendance: 150; Referee: Georgi Ivanov (Sofia); Man of the Match: Daniel Naumov
Note: According to a regulation, issued on 5 August 2020 by the Ministry for Sport and Youth, stadiums are allowed to host up to 50% of its capacity, but no more than 1,000 spectators per block.

13 September 2020 5	CSKA 1948	2−0	Montana	Sofia
18:45 UTC+3	Ivanov 31', 87'; Vasilev (yellow card) 35'; Klimentov (yellow card) 47'; Marin (yellow card) 72'; S. Aleksandrov (yellow card) 76'; Rusev (yellow card) 84'	Report		Stadium: Natsionalen stadion Vasil Levski; Attendance: 100; Referee: Valentin Zhelezov (Burgas); Man of the Match: Galin Ivanov
Note: According to a regulation, issued on 5 August 2020 by the Ministry for Sport and Youth, stadiums are allowed to host up to 50% of its capacity, but no more than 1,000 spectators per block. On 1 September 2020 the Ministry of Sport and Youth extended the validity of this regulation until 30 September 2020.

19 September 2020 6	Levski	3−0	CSKA 1948	Sofia
21:00 UTC+3	Mohammed 6'; Spierings (yellow card) 36'; B. Tsonev 56', 63' (pen.)	Report	Rusev (yellow card) 30'; Marin (yellow card) 33'; Yusein (yellow card) 50'; Klimentov (yellow card) 60'; Mladenov (yellow card) 86'	Stadium: Stadion Vivacom Arena - Georgi Asparuhov; Attendance: 1,000; Referee: Volen Chinkov (Sofia); Man of the Match: Borislav Tsonev
Note: According to a regulation, issued on 5 August 2020 by the Ministry for Sport and Youth, stadiums are allowed to host up to 50% of its capacity, but no more than 1,000 spectators per block. On 1 September 2020 the Ministry of Sport and Youth extended the validity of this regulation until 30 September 2020.

25 September 2020 7	CSKA 1948	5−1	Etar	Sofia
21:00 UTC+3	Kamburov 5'; D. Aleksandrov 20'; Rusev 43', 62'; Ivanov 72'; Petrov (yellow card) 88'	Report	Angelov 45+2' (pen.), (yellow card) 78'; P. Petkov (yellow card) 60'; Shterev (yellow card) 65'	Stadium: Natsionalen stadion Vasil Levski; Attendance: 100; Referee: Vasimir El-Hatib (Sofia); Man of the Match: Martin Kamburov
Note: According to a regulation, issued on 5 August 2020 by the Ministry for Sport and Youth, stadiums are allowed to host up to 50% of its capacity, but no more than 1,000 spectators per block. On 1 September 2020 the Ministry of Sport and Youth extended the validity of this regulation until 30 September 2020.

2 October 2020 8	CSKA 1948	5−0	Botev Plovdiv	Sofia
20:15 UTC+3	Kamburov 36' (pen.), 63'; Ivanov 45+2'; Rusev 50'; Shopov (yellow card) 58'; Argilashki 68' (o.g.)	Report	Espinosa (yellow card) 33'; Shokolarov (yellow card) 37'; Iliev (yellow card) 54'	Stadium: Natsionalen stadion Vasil Levski; Attendance: 100; Referee: Petar Kirilov (Dobrich); Man of the Match: Martin Kamburov
Note: According to a regulation, issued on 5 August 2020 by the Ministry for Sport and Youth, stadiums are allowed to host up to 50% of its capacity, but no more than 1,000 spectators per block. On 1 September 2020 the Ministry of Sport and Youth extended the validity of this regulation until 30 September 2020. A further extension until 31 October 2020 was granted by the Ministry of Sport and Youth on 30 September 2020.

18 October 2020 9	Botev Vratsa	0−0	CSKA 1948	Vratsa
15:15 UTC+3	Milanov (yellow card) 69'	Report	Vasilev (yellow card) 21'; D. Aleksandrov (yellow card) 26'; Petrov (yellow card) 59'; S. Aleksandrov (yellow card) 81'	Stadium: Stadion Hristo Botev; Attendance: 800; Referee: Valentin Zhelezov (Burgas); Man of the Match: Daniel Genov
Note: According to a regulation, issued on 5 August 2020 by the Ministry for Sport and Youth, stadiums are allowed to host up to 50% of its capacity, but no more than 1,000 spectators per block. On 1 September 2020 the Ministry of Sport and Youth extended the validity of this regulation until 30 September 2020. A further extension until 31 October 2020 was granted by the Ministry of Sport and Youth on 30 September 2020.

25 October 2020 10	CSKA 1948	5−1	Slavia	Sofia
12:30 UTC+2	Kamburov 33', 53' (pen.); Shopov 43'; Bastunov 63', 81'	Report	Stoev 49'; Terziev (yellow card) 52'	Stadium: Natsionalen stadion Vasil Levski; Attendance: 200; Referee: Nikola Popov (Sofia); Man of the Match: Vasil Shopov
Note: According to a regulation, issued on 5 August 2020 by the Ministry for Sport and Youth, stadiums are allowed to host up to 50% of its capacity, but no more than 1,000 spectators per block. On 1 September 2020 the Ministry of Sport and Youth extended the validity of this regulation until 30 September 2020. A further extension until 31 October 2020 was granted by the Ministry of Sport and Youth on 30 September 2020.

30 October 2020 11	Cherno More	1−2	CSKA 1948	Varna
17:00 UTC+2	Coureur 21'; Dimov (yellow card) 54'; Panayotov (yellow card) 61'	Report	Ivanov 29', (yellow card) 41'; Kamburov 63' (pen.); Yusein (yellow card) 70'; Minkov (yellow card) 90'	Stadium: Stadion Ticha; Attendance: 0 Referee: Georgi Dimitrov (Sofia); Man of the Match: Galin Ivanov
Note: On 27 October 2020 the Ministry of Health announced that stadiums are not allowed to host spectators for the following two weeks due to a recent spike of COVID-19-related infections in Bulgaria.

8 November 2020 12	CSKA 1948	0−3	Ludogorets	Sofia
12:30 UTC+2		Report	Nedyalkov (yellow card) 38'; Keșerü 45', 77'; Tchibota 65'	Stadium: Natsionalen stadion Vasil Levski; Attendance: 0 Referee: Stanislav Todorov (Shumen); Man of the Match: Claudiu Keșerü
Note: On 27 October 2020 the Ministry of Health announced that stadiums are not allowed to host spectators for the following two weeks due to a recent spike of COVID-19-related infections in Bulgaria.

22 November 2020 13	Lokomotiv	1−1	CSKA 1948	Plovdiv
17:30 UTC+2	Masoero 5'; Petrović (yellow card) 39'	Report	Tsvetanov 15' (o.g.); Vasilev (yellow card) 28'; Topuzov (yellow card) 33'; Mladenov (yellow card) 55'; Bastunov (yellow card) 80'	Stadium: Stadion Lokomotiv; Attendance: 0 Referee: Georgi Davidov (Veliko Tarnovo); Man of the Match: Daniel Naumov
Note: On 11 November 2020 the Ministry of Health announced that stadiums are not allowed to host spectators until 30 November due to the ongoing increase of COVID-19-related infections in Bulgaria.

29 November 2020 14	CSKA	2−0	CSKA 1948	Sofia
19:00 UTC+2	Sowe 18'; Zanev (yellow card) 21'; Yomov (yellow card) 41'; Youga (yellow card) 68'; Sankharé (yellow card) 82'; Marin 83' (o.g.)	Report	Bastunov (yellow card) 34'	Stadium: Stadion Balgarska Armia; Attendance: 0 Referee: Petar Kirilov (Dobrich); Man of the Match: Ali Sowe
Note: On 11 November 2020 the Ministry of Health announced that stadiums are not allowed to host spectators until 30 November due to the ongoing increase of COVID-19-related infections in Bulgaria.

5 December 2020 15	CSKA 1948	1−0	Beroe	Sofia
14:15 UTC+2	S. Aleksandrov (yellow card) 18'; Shopov 48', (yellow card) 57'; Rusev (yellow card) 73'	Report	Furtado (yellow card) 24'; Makouta (yellow card) 39'; Tsvetkov (yellow card) 67'; Dimitrov (yellow card) 83'	Stadium: Natsionalen stadion Vasil Levski; Attendance: 0 Referee: Vladimir Valkov (Plovdiv); Man of the Match: Vasil Shopov
Note: On 25 November 2020 the Ministry of Health announced that stadiums are not allowed to host spectators for further four weeks due to an ongoing spike of COVID-19-related infections in Bulgaria.

11 December 2020 16	Arda	1−1	CSKA 1948	Kardzhali
17:30 UTC+2	Sulaka (yellow card) 52'; Tilev (yellow card) 71'; Kokonov 74' (pen.)	Report	Topuzov (yellow card) 20'; Marin (yellow card) 48'; Kamburov 62'; Shopov (yellow card) 72'; Pirgov (yellow card) 74'; Ivanov (yellow card) 90+1'	Stadium: Arena Arda; Attendance: 0 Referee: Nikola Popov (Sofia); Man of the Match: Spas Delev
Note: On 25 November 2020 the Ministry of Health announced that stadiums are not allowed to host spectators for further four weeks due to an ongoing spike of COVID-19-related infections in Bulgaria.

14 February 2021 17	CSKA 1948	2−1	Tsarsko Selo	Sofia
14:30 UTC+2	S. Aleksandrov (yellow card) 7'; Louka 23' (o.g.); Klimentov (yellow card) 55'; Rusev 74' (pen.); Yusein (yellow card) 76'; Lyaskov (yellow card) 87'	Report	Mertens (yellow card) 27'; Kostadinov 67'; Baltanov (yellow card) 84'	Stadium: Natsionalen stadion Vasil Levski; Attendance: 0 Referee: Ivaylo Stoyanov (Petrich); Man of the Match: Galin Ivanov
Note: On 26 January 2021 the Ministry of Health announced that stadiums are not allowed to host spectators until 30 April 2021 due to a ongoing COVID-19 pandemic in Bulgaria in Bulgaria.

19 February 2021 18	Montana	1−0	CSKA 1948	Montana
17:30 UTC+2	Tasev 22' (pen.); Minkov (yellow card) 44'; S. Georgiev (yellow card) 53' (yellow-red card) 61'; Terziev (yellow card) 82'; Mihov (yellow card) 90+4'	Report	Marin (yellow card) 90+3'	Stadium: Stadion Ogosta; Attendance: 0 Referee: Vasimir El-Hatib (Sofia); Man of the Match: Toni Tasev
Note: On 26 January 2021 the Ministry of Health announced that stadiums are not allowed to host spectators until 30 April 2021 due to a ongoing COVID-19 pandemic in Bulgaria in Bulgaria.

28 February 2021 19	CSKA 1948	0−0	Levski	Sofia
17:00 UTC+2	Rusev (yellow card) 77'; Mitkov (yellow card) 79'; S. Aleksandrov (yellow card) 90'	Report		Stadium: Natsionalen stadion Vasil Levski; Attendance: 0 Referee: Nikola Popov (Sofia); Man of the Match: Lazar Marin
Note: On 26 January 2021 the Ministry of Health announced that stadiums are not allowed to host spectators until 30 April 2021 due to a ongoing COVID-19 pandemic in Bulgaria in Bulgaria.

7 March 2021 20	Etar	3−1	CSKA 1948	Veliko Tarnovo
12:00 UTC+2	Missi Mezu 18', 57'; Borukov (yellow card) 62'	Report	D. Aleksandrov 4'; Lyaskov (yellow card) 23'; Vasilev (yellow card) 75'	Stadium: Stadion Ivaylo; Attendance: 0 Referee: Radoslav Gidzhenov (Plovdiv); Man of the Match: Gaëtan Missi Mezu
Note: On 26 January 2021 the Ministry of Health announced that stadiums are not allowed to host spectators until 30 April 2021 due to a ongoing COVID-19 pandemic in Bulgaria in Bulgaria.

13 March 2021 21	Botev Plovdiv	3−2	CSKA 1948	Plovdiv
14:15 UTC+2	Konaté 16'; Iliev 29', 88'; Tonev (yellow card) 45+1'; Rabeï (yellow card) 62'	Report	Mitkov (yellow card) 25'; Lyaskov (yellow card) 44'; Ivanov 68'; Chochev (yellow card) 75'; Bastunov 90+4'	Stadium: Futbolen kompleks Botev 1912; Attendance: 0 Referee: Stanislav Todorov (Shumen); Man of the Match: Atanas Iliev
Note: On 26 January 2021 the Ministry of Health announced that stadiums are not allowed to host spectators until 30 April 2021 due to a ongoing COVID-19 pandemic in Bulgaria in Bulgaria.

21 March 2021 22	CSKA 1948	1−0	Botev Vratsa	Sofia
12:00 UTC+2	Ivanov 76' (pen.), (yellow card) 90+5'	Report	Ivaylov (yellow card) 24'	Stadium: Natsionalen stadion Vasil Levski; Attendance: 0 Referee: Volen Chinkov (Sofia); Man of the Match: Galin Ivanov
Note: On 26 January 2021 the Ministry of Health announced that stadiums are not allowed to host spectators until 30 April 2021 due to a ongoing COVID-19 pandemic in Bulgaria in Bulgaria.

9 April 2021 23	Slavia	1−3	CSKA 1948	Sofia
19:30 UTC+3	Antovski (yellow card) 69'; Aleksandrov (yellow card) 82'; Rangelov (yellow card) 90+3'	Report	Mitkov (yellow card) 29'; Bastunov (yellow card) 50', (goal) 67'; Minkov (yellow card) 61'; Chochev (yellow card) 83'; Shopov 86'; D. Aleksandrov 88'	Stadium: Stadion Slavia; Attendance: 0 Referee: Georgi Dimitrov (Sofia); Man of the Match: Vasil Shopov
Note: On 26 January 2021 the Ministry of Health announced that stadiums are not allowed to host spectators until 30 April 2021 due to a ongoing COVID-19 pandemic in Bulgaria in Bulgaria. The game has been originally planned to be played between 2 and 5 April, but on 2 March 2021 it has been moved for the period between 8 and 12 April due to a round of rescheduling related to the 2021 Bulgarian parliamentary election.

16 April 2021 24	CSKA 1948	0−0	Cherno More	Sofia
19:30 UTC+3	Rusev (yellow card) 79'; Klimentov (yellow card) 88'	Report	Isa (yellow card) 90+1'	Stadium: Natsionalen stadion Vasil Levski; Attendance: 0 Referee: Georgi Kabakov (Plovdiv); Man of the Match: Daniel Naumov
Note: On 26 January 2021 the Ministry of Health announced that stadiums are not allowed to host spectators until 30 April 2021 due to a ongoing COVID-19 pandemic in Bulgaria in Bulgaria. The game has been originally planned to be played between 9 and 12 April, but on 2 March 2021 it has been moved for the period between 15 and 18 April due to a round of rescheduling related to the 2021 Bulgarian parliamentary election.

22 April 2021 25	Ludogorets	4−0	CSKA 1948	Razgrad
19:00 UTC+3	Josué Sá 35'; Despodov 40', 61', (yellow card) 41'; Lyaskov 45' (o.g.)	Report	Lyaskov (yellow card) 89'	Stadium: Huvepharma Arena; Attendance: 0 Referee: Stanislav Todorov (Shumen); Man of the Match: Kiril Despodov
Note: On 26 January 2021 the Ministry of Health announced that stadiums are not allowed to host spectators until 30 April 2021 due to a ongoing COVID-19 pandemic in Bulgaria in Bulgaria. The game has been originally planned to be played on 14 April, but on 2 March 2021 it has been moved for the period between 20 and 22 April due to a round of rescheduling related to the 2021 Bulgarian parliamentary election.

26 April 2021 26	CSKA 1948	1−0	Lokomotiv	Sofia
18:00 UTC+3	Gospodinov (yellow card) 34'; Chochev 55'; Petrov (yellow card) 76'; Lyaskov (yellow card) 77'	Report	Iliev (penalty missed) 77'; Almeida (yellow card) 87'	Stadium: Natsionalen stadion Vasil Levski; Attendance: 200; Referee: Georgi Ivanov (Sofia); Man of the Match: Ivaylo Chochev
Note: On 26 January 2021 the Ministry of Health announced that stadiums are not allowed to host spectators until 30 April 2021 due to a ongoing COVID-19 pandemic in Bulgaria in Bulgaria. On 23 April 2021 the Ministry for Health revised its decision by allowing stadiums to host up to 30% of its capacity, but no more than 1,000 spectators per block. The game has been originally planned to be played between 16 and 19 April, but on 2 March 2021 it has been moved for the period between 23 and 26 April due to a round of rescheduling related to the 2021 Bulgarian parliamentary election.

12 May 2021 29	Arda	0−0	CSKA 1948	Kardzhali
17:00 UTC+3	Krumov (yellow card) 16'; Kotev (yellow card) 39'; Kokonov (red card) 63'	Report	Lichev (yellow card) 25'; S. Aleksandrov (yellow card) 57' (yellow-red card) 85'; Klimentov (yellow card) 71'; Lyaskov (yellow card) 83'	Stadium: Arena Arda; Referee: Stanislav Todorov (Shumen); Man of the Match: Nikola Videnov
Note: On 23 April 2021 the Ministry for Health announced that stadiums are allowed to host up to 30% of its capacity, but no more than 1,000 spectators per block.

16 May 2021 30	Beroe	3−3	CSKA 1948	Stara Zagora
20:15 UTC+3	Fall (yellow card) 20', (goal) 83'; Tsvetkov (yellow card) 35'; Ali (yellow card) 53'; Kamburov 57'; Conté 70'; Hassani (yellow card) 80'	Report	D. Aleksandrov (yellow card) 26'; Chochev 36' (pen.), (yellow card) 37' (yellow-red card) 45+6'; Rusev 55' (pen.), 67'; Klimentov (yellow card) 88'; Naumov (yellow card) 90+2'	Stadium: Stadion Beroe; Referee: Georgi Davidov (Veliko Tarnovo); Man of the Match: Martin Kamburov
Note: On 23 April 2021 the Ministry for Health announced that stadiums are allowed to host up to 30% of its capacity, but no more than 1,000 spectators per block.

19 May 2021 27	Lokomotiv	0−0	CSKA 1948	Plovdiv
17:00 UTC+3	Iliev (penalty missed) 16'; Ruane (yellow card) 70'	Report	Naumov (yellow card) 15'; S. Aleksandrov (yellow card) 57'; Petrov (yellow card) 75'; Mitkov (yellow card) 86'; Lyaskov (yellow card) 90+8' (yellow-red card) 90+9'	Stadium: Stadion Lokomotiv; Referee: Valentin Zhelezov (Burgas); Man of the Match: Daniel Naumov
Note: On 23 April 2021 the Ministry for Health announced that stadiums are allowed to host up to 30% of its capacity, but no more than 1,000 spectators per block. The game was originally scheduled for 4 May, but on 3 May the BFU decided the postpone the game for a later date because members of the CSKA 1948 staff, including 11 players, tested positive for COVID-19. On 13 May, the scheduling committee of the BFU announced that the game has been rescheduled for 19 May.

22 May 2021 28	CSKA 1948	1−0	CSKA	Sofia
19:00 UTC+3	Haydarov (yellow card) 23'; Topuzov 65', (yellow card) 74'; Klimentov (yellow card) 72'; Damyanov (yellow card) 79'; Marin (yellow card) 90+4'	Report	Vion (yellow card) 11'; Turitsov (yellow card) 57'; Tiago (yellow card) 76'; Carey (yellow card) 83'; Youga (yellow card) 85'; Caicedo (yellow card) 89', (penalty missed) 90+5'	Stadium: Natsionalen stadion Vasil Levski; Referee: Georgi Kabakov (Plovdiv); Man of the Match: Daniel Naumov
Note: On 23 April 2021 the Ministry for Health announced that stadiums are allowed to host up to 30% of its capacity, but no more than 1,000 spectators per block. CSKA 1948 requested its postponement for a later date because members of its staff, including 11 players, tested positive for COVID-19. The scheduling committee of the BFU, however, rejected this request citing schedule congetion. The BFU decision has been confirmed by its appeal committee on 7 May. On the same day the scheduling committee confirmed that they had received a notification from CSKA 1948 that the team would not attend the game with a pending decision on the game outcome. As the game has not taken place, on 10 May the technical committee of the BFU awarded a 3−0 win to CSKA and 3 points. However, on 13 May the technical committee of the BFU revoked the decisions from 7 and 10 May and decided to reschedule the game for 22 May.

26 May 2021 31	CSKA 1948	3−1	Ludogorets	Sofia
20:00 UTC+3	Chochev 2'; Ivanov 15', 79'	Report	Yankov (yellow card) 26'; Keșerü 74'	Stadium: Natsionalen stadion Vasil Levski; Referee: Volen Chinkov (Sofia); Man of the Match: Galin Ivanov
Note: On 23 April 2021 the Ministry for Health announced that stadiums are allowed to host up to 30% of its capacity, but no more than 1,000 spectators per block. The game was originally scheduled for 22 May, but following the several COVID-19-related reschedules it has been moved for 26 May.

=== Bulgarian Cup ===
21 October 2020 1R	Drenovets	0−6	CSKA 1948	Drenovets
15:00 UTC+3		Report	Bastunov 8', 25'; Belchev 13' (o.g.); Shopov 17'; Gushterov 45' (pen.); D. Aleksandrov 88'	Stadium: Stadion Drenovets; Attendance: 0 Referee: Petar Kuzev (Gabrovo)
Note: According to a regulation, issued on 5 August 2020 by the Ministry for Sport and Youth, stadiums are allowed to host up to 50% of its capacity, but no more than 1,000 spectators per block. On 1 September 2020 the Ministry of Sport and Youth extended the validity of this regulation until 30 September 2020. A further extension until 31 October 2020 was granted by the Ministry of Sport and Youth on 30 September 2020.

3 March 2021 2R	Botev Plovdiv	1−2 (a.e.t.)	CSKA 1948	Plovdiv
12:00 UTC+2	Marquinhos 53'; Rabeï (yellow card) 57'; Toku (yellow card) 99'; Valentić (yellow card) 111'	Report	Chochev 16' (pen.); Shopov (yellow card) 59'; Mitkov (yellow card) 86', (goal) 100'; S. Aleksandrov (yellow card) 101'; Lyaskov (yellow card) 119'	Stadium: Futbolen kompleks Botev 1912; Attendance: 0 Referee: Georgi Davidov (Veliko Tarnovo)
Note: On 26 January 2021 the Ministry of Health announced that stadiums are not allowed to host spectators until 30 April 2021 due to a ongoing COVID-19 pandemic in Bulgaria in Bulgaria.

17 March 2021 QF	CSKA 1948	0−1	Arda	Sofia
15:30 UTC+2	Lyaskov (yellow card) 43'	Report	Lozev (yellow card) 16'; Delev 55'	Stadium: Natsionalen stadion Vasil Levski; Attendance: 0 Referee: Valentin Zhelezov (Burgas)
Note: On 26 January 2021 the Ministry of Health announced that stadiums are not allowed to host spectators until 30 April 2021 due to a ongoing COVID-19 pandemic in Bulgaria in Bulgaria.

=== Friendlies ===
17 June 2020	CSKA 1948	2−0	Belasitsa Petrich	Boyana
18:00	Petkov 20'; Angelov 70'	Report		Stadium: Natsionalna futbolna baza Boyana

20 June 2020	CSKA 1948	4−1	Septemvri Simitli	Boyana
18:00	Bastunov 2'; Petrov 43'; Klimentov 65'; Shopov 90'	Report	Hazurov 15'	Stadium: Natsionalna futbolna baza Boyana

24 June 2020	CSKA 1948	1−0	Montana	Boyana
18:00	Gushterov 16'	Report		Stadium: Natsionalna futbolna baza Boyana

27 June 2020	CSKA 1948	5−0	Strumska Slava	Boyana
18:00	Mladenov 7', 28', 32'; Bastunov 23'; Gushterov 64'	Report		Stadium: Natsionalna futbolna baza Boyana

11 July 2020	CSKA 1948	1−1	Kariana	Razlog
	Pirgov 57'	Report	Ignatov 47'	Stadium: Gradski stadion

17 July 2020	Pirin Blagoevgrad	1−1	CSKA 1948	Blagoevgrad
19:00	Yordanov 17'	Report	Todorov 80'	Stadium: Stadion Hristo Botev; Referee: Georgi Nikolov

19 July 2020	CSKA 1948	1−0	Etar	Pravets
19:00	Pirgov 20'	Report		Stadium: Gradski stadion

25 July 2020	Beroe	4−0	CSKA 1948	Stara Zagora
19:30	Makouta 17', 57'; Conté 20', 64'	Report		Stadium: Stadion Beroe

29 July 2020	Tsarsko Selo	1−2	CSKA 1948	Sofia
19:00	Cissé 8'	Report	Yusein 5'; Mariyanov 45'	Stadium: Tsarsko Selo sport complex

2 August 2020	Lokomotiv Sofia	2−2	CSKA 1948	Sofia
18:00	Milev 19'; Dikov 45'	Report	Vasilev 83'; Bastunov 85'	Stadium: Stadion Lokomotiv

5 September 2020	CSKA 1948	4−1	Strumska Slava	Bistritsa
18:00	Mladenov 12'; Shopov 20'; Kamburov 33'; Bastunov 72'	Report	Asate 60'	Stadium: Stadion Bistritsa

9 October 2020	CSKA 1948	2−2	Etar	Pravets
14:30	Mladenov 8'; Marin 81'	Report	Krachunov 18'; Pehlivanov 65'	Stadium: Gradski stadion

16 January 2021	CSKA 1948	4−0	Septemvri Sofia	Dragalevtsi
14:00	Klimentov 9'; D. Aleksandrov 11'; Topuzov 28'; Bastunov 58'	Report		Stadium: Stadion DIT

21 January 2021	CSKA 1948 (Bulgaria)	1−2	(Poland) Stal Mielec	Kargıcak, Turkey
16:00	Chochev 62'	Report	Pawłowski 32'; Granlund 51'	Stadium: Goldcity turizm kompleksi

26 January 2021	CSKA 1948 (Bulgaria)	1−1	(Ukraine) Oleksandriya	Kargıcak, Turkey
16:00	S. Aleksandrov 74'	Report	Yusein 44' (o.g.)	Stadium: Goldcity turizm kompleksi

31 January 2021	CSKA 1948 (Bulgaria)	1−0	(North Macedonia) Makedonija GP	Kargıcak, Turkey
15:00	Topuzov 16'	Report		Stadium: Goldcity turizm kompleksi

4 February 2021	CSKA 1948 (Bulgaria)	2−2	(Ukraine) Dynamo Kyiv	Aksu, Turkey
16:00	Topuzov 46'; Bastunov 82'	Report	Tsyhankov 30'; De Pena 61' (pen.)	Stadium: Mardan Sports Complex

5 February 2021	CSKA 1948 (Bulgaria)	0−1	(Ukraine) Inhulets	Kargıcak, Turkey
16:00		Report	Schedryi 90'	Stadium: Goldcity turizm kompleksi

27 March 2021	CSKA 1948	2−1	Minyor	Pravets
11:00	Bastunov 65'; Minkov 89'	Report	Bozhilov 17'	Stadium: Gradski stadion
