= 2019–20 Bulgarian Cup =

Купа на България

Tournament details
- Country: Bulgaria
- Teams: 46

Final positions
- Champions: Lokomotiv Plovdiv (2nd title)
- Runners-up: CSKA Sofia

Tournament statistics
- Matches played: 47
- Goals scored: 131 (2.79 per match)
- Attendance: 50,784 (1,081 per match)
- Top goal scorer(s): (Bulgaria) Dimitar Iliev (Bulgaria) Eray Karadayi (5 goals each)
- All statistics correct as of 1 July 2020.

The 2019−20 Bulgarian Cup was the 38th official edition of the Bulgarian annual football knockout tournament. The competition began on 4 September 2019 with the preliminary round and finished with the final on 1 July 2020, having been delayed due to the COVID-19 pandemic in Bulgaria. Lokomotiv Plovdiv successfully defended the cup by winning on penalties against CSKA Sofia and qualified for the first qualifying round of the 2020–21 UEFA Europa League.

== Participating clubs ==
The following 46 teams qualified for the competition:

2019–20 First League; 14 clubs	2019–20 Second League; 16 non-reserve clubs	Winners of 4 regional competitions 16 clubs
Arda Kardzhali; Beroe Stara Zagora; Botev Plovdiv; Botev Vratsa; CSKA Sofia; Cherno More Varna; Dunav Ruse; Etar Veliko Tarnovo; Levski Sofia; Lokomotiv Plovdiv; Ludogorets Razgrad; Slavia Sofia; Tsarsko Selo Sofia; Vitosha Bistritsa	Botev Galabovo; Chernomorets Balchik; CSKA 1948 Sofia; Hebar Pazardzhik; Kariana Erden; Litex Lovech; Lokomotiv Gorna Oryahovitsa; Lokomotiv Sofia; Montana; Neftochimic Burgas; Pirin Blagoevgrad; Pomorie; Septemvri Sofia; Spartak Pleven; Spartak Varna; Strumska Slava Radomir	from North-East zone: Dobrudzha Dobrich; Hitrino; Suvorovo; Svetkavitsa Targovishte; from North-West zone: Drenovets; Lato Alekovo; Partizan Cherven Bryag; Sevlievo; from South-West zone: Balkan Botevgrad (winners of BAFL Cup); Botev Ihtiman; Minyor Pernik; Vihren Sandanski; from South-East zone: Maritsa Plovdiv; Sozopol; Varbitsa Benkovski; Zagorets Nova Zagora

== Matches ==
=== Preliminary round ===
The draw was conducted on 23 August 2019. The games will be played between 4 and 6 September 2019. In this stage participated 15 winners from the regional amateur competitions and 14 non-reserve teams from Second League. During the draw, Botev Ihtiman received a bye to the first round.

4 September 2019	Hitrino (III)	1−2 (a.e.t.)	Kariana Erden (II)	Hitrino
16:00 EEST	Vasilev 90+1'	Report	Halil 57'; Bastunov 100'	Stadium: Stadion Hitrino; Referee: Nikola Petrov (Lovech)

4 September 2019	Lato Alekovo (IV)	0−1	Spartak Varna (II)	Svishtov (Note: Lato Alekovo hosts all its games at Stadion Akademik in Svishtov, as Alekovo does not have a local stadium.)
16:00 EEST		Report	Nikolov 86'	Stadium: Stadion Akademik; Referee: Petar Kuzev (Gabrovo)

4 September 2019	Maritsa Plovdiv (III)	1−3	Lokomotiv Gorna Oryahovitsa (II)	Plovdiv
16:00 EEST	Atanasov 70'	Report	Stefanov 12', 68'; Hristov 86'	Stadium: Stadion Maritsa; Referee: Vasimir El-Hatib (Sofia)

4 September 2019	Minyor Pernik (III)	1−0	Strumska Slava Radomir (II)	Pernik
16:00 EEST	Vasev 41'	Report		Stadium: Stadion Minyor; Referee: Ivaylo Nenkov (Sofia)

4 September 2019	Sozopol (III)	0−1	Pomorie (II)	Sozopol
16:00 EEST		Report	Zhekov 74'	Stadium: Arena Sozopol; Referee: Valentin Zhelezov (Burgas)

4 September 2019	Svetkavitsa Targovishte (III)	1−4	Spartak Pleven (II)	Targovishte
16:00 EEST	Arsovski 30'	Report	Traykov 15'; Todorov 28', 85'; I. Ivanov 75'	Stadium: Stadion Dimitar Burkov; Referee: Krasimir Krastev (Shumen)

4 September 2019	Varbitsa Benkovski (IV)	1−4	Chernomorets Balchik (II)	Zlatograd (Note: The match took place at the Gradski stadion in Zlatograd instead of Vrabnitsa Benkovski's home stadium, Stadion Dimitar Penev in Benkovski.)
16:00 EEST	Argatev 46'	Report	Kaloyanov 38'; Mihaylov 58'; Stefanov 73'; Kaziev 81' (o.g.)	Stadium: Gradski stadion Referee: Valentin Stanchev (Sliven)

4 September 2019	Vihren Sandanski (III)	0−2	Botev Galabovo (II)	Sandanski
16:00 EEST		Report	Karadayi 57', 84'	Stadium: Stadion Sandanski; Referee: Blagoy Manov (Blagoevgrad)

5 September 2019	Dobrudzha Dobrich (III)	1−0	Lokomotiv Sofia (II)	Dobrich
16:00 EEST	Stoyanov 10'	Report		Stadium: Stadion Druzhba; Referee: Georgi Ginchev (Veliko Tarnovo)

5 September 2019	Drenovets (III)	1−2 (a.e.t.)	Litex Lovech (II)	Drenovets
16:00 EEST	Todorov 69'	Report	Zhivkov 9'; G. Ivanov 98' (pen.)	Stadium: Stadion Drenovets; Referee: Georgi Ivanov (Plovdiv)

5 September 2019	Partizan Cherven Bryag (III)	1−4	Hebar Pazardzhik (II)	Cherven Bryag
16:00 EEST	Rusev 29'	Report	Marchev 21', 42'; Chavorski 58'; Hamdiev 89'	Stadium: Gradski stadion Referee: Dimitar Zhelyazkov (Silistra)

5 September 2019	Suvorovo (III)	0−3	CSKA 1948 Sofia (II)	Suvorovo
16:00 EEST		Report	Gushterov 30'; D. Aleksandrov 65' (pen.); Klimentov 83'	Stadium: Stadion Suvorovo; Referee: Dimitar Burov (Sofia)

5 September 2019	Zagorets Nova Zagora (III)	0−0 (a.e.t.) (5−4 p)	Pirin Blagoevgrad (II)	Nova Zagora
16:00 EEST		Report		Stadium: Stadion Zagorets; Referee: Dimo Dimov (Sliven)
	Penalties
	Penalty scored		(penalty scored) Zlatinov; (penalty scored) Pushkarov; (penalty scored) Pereira; (penalty scored) Henderson; (penalty missed) Ademov

6 September 2019	Sevlievo (III)	1−3 (a.e.t.)	Neftochimic Burgas (II)	Sevlievo
16:00 EEST	Georgiev 65'	Report	Petkov 90+3' (pen.); Chahov 103', 118'	Stadium: Stadion Rakovski; Referee: Ryustem Karageren (Asenovgrad)

=== Round of 32 ===
The draw was conducted on 23 August 2019. The games will be played between 24 and 26 September 2019. In this stage participated the 15 winners from the first round, as well as the 14 teams from First League, the two best-placed teams from Second League (Septemvri Sofia and Montana), and the winner of the Cup of Bulgarian Amateur Football League (Balkan Botevgrad).

24 September 2019	Botev Ihtiman (III)	0−3	Cherno More Varna (I)	Ihtiman
16:00 EEST		Report	Minchev 50'; Rodrigo 79'; Yordanov 90+1'	Stadium: Stadion Hristo Botev; Attendance: 430; Referee: Valentin Stanchev (Sliven)

24 September 2019	Kariana Erden (II)	3−0	Tsarsko Selo Sofia (I)	Erden
16:00 EEST	Predev 6'; Bastunov 31'; Todorov 73'	Report		Stadium: Sporten komplex Kariana; Attendance: 160; Referee: Yoto Garabedov (Sofia)

24 September 2019	Lokomotiv Gorna Oryahovitsa (II)	0−3	CSKA Sofia (I)	Gorna Oryahovitsa
18:30 EEST		Report	Davydov 20'; Watt 55', 62'	Stadium: Stadion Lokomotiv; Attendance: 1,600; Referee: Dimo Dimov (Sliven)

25 September 2019	Dobrudzha Dobrich (III)	0−4	Botev Vratsa (I)	Dobrich
16:00 EEST		Report	Budinov 46', 53'; Genov 61'; Atanasov 73'	Stadium: Stadion Druzhba; Attendance: 750; Referee: Dimitar Zhelyazkov (Silistra)

25 September 2019	Minyor Pernik (III)	1−2	Botev Plovdiv (I)	Pernik
16:00 EEST	Yosifov 12'	Report	Viana 11', 83'	Stadium: Stadion Minyor; Attendance: 2,200; Referee: Mustafa Shefket (Kardzhali)

25 September 2019	Spartak Varna (II)	1−5	Levski Sofia (I)	Balchik (Note: The match took place at Stadion Balchik in Balchik instead of Spartak's home stadium in Varna.)
16:00 EEST	Rusev 63'	Report	Mazurek 28'; Alar 42'; Mohammed 50'; M. D. Petkov 55', 57'	Stadium: Stadion Balchik; Attendance: 850; Referee: Stanislav Todorov (Shumen)

25 September 2019	Zagorets Nova Zagora (III)	0−4	Slavia Sofia (I)	Nova Zagora
16:00 EEST		Report	Chunchukov 9', 16'; Uzunov 52'; Krastev 81'	Stadium: Stadion Zagorets; Attendance: 300; Referee: Daniel Kraevski (Plovdiv)

25 September 2019	Litex Lovech (II)	3−0	Montana (II)	Lovech
19:00 EEST	Ganev 14'; Yordanov 74', 88' (pen.)	Report		Stadium: Gradski stadion Attendance: 130; Referee: Ivan Penchev (Stara Zagora)

25 September 2019	Neftochimic Burgas (II)	1−4	Ludogorets Razgrad (I)	Sozopol (Note: The match took place at Arena Sozopol in Sozopol instead of Neftochimic's home stadium Lazur in Burgas.)
19:00 EEST	Apostolov 12'	Report	Tchibota 53', 76', 90+2'; Lukoki 60'	Stadium: Arena Sozopol; Attendance: 520; Referee: Dimitar Burov (Sofia)

26 September 2019	Balkan Botevgrad (III)	0−3	Lokomotiv Plovdiv (I)	Botevgrad
16:00 EEST		Report	Almeida 27'; Ožbolt 37'; D. Iliev 62'	Stadium: Stadion Hristo Botev; Attendance: 350; Referee: Nikolay Maldzhanski (Montana)

26 September 2019	Hebar Pazardzhik (II)	0−2	Arda Kardzhali (I)	Bratsigovo (Note: The match took place at Stadion Bratsigovo in Bratsigovo instead of Hebar's home stadium in Pazardzhik.)
16:00 EEST		Report	Vasilev 37'; Georgiev 64'	Stadium: Stadion Bratsigovo; Attendance: 410; Referee: Georgi Davidov (Veliko Tarnovo)

26 September 2019	Pomorie (II)	0−2	Beroe Stara Zagora (I)	Pomorie
16:00 EEST		Report	Minchev 27'; Brígido 67'	Stadium: Stadion Pomorie; Attendance: 100; Referee: Dimitar Dimitrov (Pernik)

26 September 2019	Spartak Pleven (II)	3−4	Septemvri Sofia (II)	Sofia (Note: The match took place at the Stadion Dragalevtsi in Sofia instead of Spartak Pleven's home stadium, Stadion Pleven in Pleven.)
16:00 EEST	Tonchev 10'; Grigorov 56', 76'	Report	Rusev 4'; V. Nikolov 13'; Galchev 44'; Petkov 88' (pen.)	Stadium: Stadion Dragalevtsi; Attendance: 100; Referee: Petar Kuzev (Gabrovo)

26 September 2019	Chernomorets Balchik (II)	0−4	Vitosha Bistritsa (I)	Balchik
18:00 EEST		Report	Kutev 1'; H. Ivanov 14'; Dolapchiev 30', 58'	Stadium: Stadion Balchik; Attendance: 200; Referee: Stefan Stavrov (Veliko Tarnovo)

26 September 2019	Botev Galabovo (II)	2−1	Etar Veliko Tarnovo (I)	Stara Zagora (Note: The match took place at Stadion Balchik in Balchik instead of Spartak's home stadium in Varna.)
19:00 EEST	Karadayi 65'; Ognyanov 68'	Report	Angelov 80'	Stadium: Trace Arena; Attendance: 100; Referee: Georgi Nikolov (Sofia)

26 September 2019	CSKA 1948 Sofia (II)	2−1	Dunav Ruse (I)	Sofia (Note: The match took place at the Natsionalen stadion Vasil Levski in Sofia instead of CSKA 1948 Sofia's home stadium, Stadion Obelya in Sofia.)
19:00 EEST	Gushterov 2'; D. Aleksandrov 72'	Report	Shterev 41'	Stadium: Natsionalen stadion Vasil Levski; Attendance: 110; Referee: Georgi Dimitrov (Sofia)

=== Round of 16 ===
The draw was conducted on 2 October 2019. Originally the games were scheduled for the period between 29 and 31 October 2019. Due to the second round of the local elections in Bulgaria and the inability of the police to provide adequate security, those games were rescheduled for the period between 3 and 5 December 2019. In this stage the participants will be the 16 winners from the first round.

3 December 2019	Beroe Stara Zagora (I)	3−4	CSKA 1948 Sofia (II)	Stara Zagora
14:30 EET	Eugénio 7'; Alkan 45+2'; Conté 76'	Report	Shopov 6', 60'; D. Aleksandrov 36', 42'	Stadium: Stadion Beroe; Attendance: 600; Referee: Ivelin Zanev (Ruse)

3 December 2019	Slavia Sofia (I)	1−2	Botev Plovdiv (I)	Sofia
17:30 EET	Krastev 61'	Report	Nedelev 3', 27'	Stadium: Stadion Slavia; Attendance: 230; Referee: Georgi Kabakov (Plovdiv)

4 December 2019	Septemvri Sofia (II)	0−3	Ludogorets Razgrad (I)	Sofia
13:30 EET		Report	Moți 11'; Świerczok 18'; Tchibota 56' (pen.)	Stadium: Stadion Dragalevtsi; Attendance: 60; Referee: Georgi Nikolov (Sofia)

4 December 2019	Botev Galabovo (II)	2−1	Vitosha Bistritsa (I)	Stara Zagora (Note: The match took place at Trace Arena in Stara Zagora instead of Botev's home stadium in Galabovo.)
15:00 EET	Karadayi 79', 90+2'	Report	Kabov 46'	Stadium: Trace Arena; Attendance: 50; Referee: Georgi Ginchev (Veliko Tarnovo)

4 December 2019	Botev Vratsa (I)	4−0	Kariana Erden (II)	Vratsa
16:00 EET	Kerchev 2'; Atanasov 25'; Yankov 36', 90+1'	Report		Stadium: Stadion Hristo Botev; Attendance: 250; Referee: Dimo Dimov (Sliven)

4 December 2019	Levski Sofia (I)	1−0	Cherno More Varna (I)	Sofia
17:30 EET	Raynov 24'	Report		Stadium: Stadion Vivacom Arena - Georgi Asparuhov; Attendance: 1,584; Referee: Nikolay Yordanov (Sofia)

5 December 2019	Arda Kardzhali (I)	0−1	CSKA Sofia (I)	Kardzhali
13:30 EET		Report	Sowe 2'	Stadium: Arena Arda; Attendance: 3,600; Referee: Ivaylo Stoyanov (Petrich)

5 December 2019	Lokomotiv Plovdiv (I)	2−1	Litex Lovech (II)	Plovdiv
17:30 EET	D. Iliev 74', 87'	Report	Mitrev 66'	Stadium: Stadion Lokomotiv; Attendance: 750; Referee: Vasimir El-Hatib (Sofia)

=== Quarter-finals ===
The draw was conducted on 10 December 2019. The games will be played on 3, 4 and 5 March 2020. In this stage the participants are the 8 winners from the Round of 16.

3 March 2020	Lokomotiv Plovdiv (I)	2−0	CSKA 1948 Sofia (II)	Plovdiv
15:00 EET	Iliev 42' (pen.); Karagaren 67'	Report		Stadium: Stadion Lokomotiv; Attendance: 2,500; Referee: Nikola Popov (Sofia)

3 March 2020	CSKA Sofia (I)	2−1	Botev Vratsa (I)	Sofia
18:00 EET	Gyasi 67'; Ahmedov 89'	Report	Genov 22'	Stadium: Stadion Balgarska Armia; Attendance: 1,600; Referee: Vladimir Valkov (Plovdiv)

4 March 2020	Botev Galabovo (II)	0−1 (a.e.t.)	Botev Plovdiv (I)	Stara Zagora (Note: The match took place at Trace Arena in Stara Zagora instead of Botev's home stadium in Galabovo.)
18:00 EET		Report	D. Tonev 100'	Stadium: Trace Arena; Attendance: 550; Referee: Georgi Davidov (Veliko Tarnovo)

5 March 2020	Levski Sofia (I)	0−0 (a.e.t.) (6−5 p)	Ludogorets Razgrad (I)	Sofia
19:00 EET		Report		Stadium: Stadion Vivacom Arena - Georgi Asparuhov; Attendance: 7,500; Referee: Dragomir Draganov (Varna)
	Penalties
	Milanov (penalty scored); Goranov (penalty scored); Robertha (penalty scored); Spierings (penalty scored); Thiam (penalty scored); Eyjólfsson (penalty scored)		(penalty scored) Moți; (penalty scored) Świerczok; (penalty scored) Grigore; (penalty scored) Cauly; (penalty scored) Marcelinho; (penalty missed) Tchibota

=== Semi-finals ===
The draw was conducted on 10 March 2020. The first legs should have been played between 7 and 9 April, while the second legs were scheduled for the dates between 21 and 23 April 2020. On 13 March 2020, the Bulgarian Football Union (BFU) suspended all games in Bulgaria until 13 April due to concerns over the coronavirus outbreak. On 6 April 2020 the BFU extended the match postponement until 13 May 2020. On 15 May 2020 the BFU declared its preparedness to resume the competition after the loosening of the state of emergency, related to the pandemic. After consulting the four semi-finalists it was decided to stage the semi-finals in two legs as originally planned. On 21 May the BFU scheduled the first legs of the semi-finals to be played on 9 and 10 June. On 15 June the BFU scheduled the second legs for 23 and 24 June. Both legs were held in stadiums with reduced capacities due to health regulations. For the first legs stadiums were allowed to host spectators up to 30% of their total capacity, as per regulation issued by the Ministry of Health on 2 June. For the second legs stadiums were allowed to host spectators up to 50% of their total capacity, but no more than 1,000 spectators per block, as per regulation issued by the Ministry of Health on 23 June.

==== First legs ====
9 June 2020	Lokomotiv Plovdiv	2−0	Levski Sofia	Plovdiv
20:30 EEST	Iliev 23'; Karagaren 45'	Report		Stadium: Stadion Lokomotiv; Attendance: 2,400; Referee: Ivaylo Stoyanov (Petrich)

10 June 2020	Botev Plovdiv	0−0	CSKA Sofia	Plovdiv
21:00 EEST		Report		Stadium: Futbolen kompleks Botev 1912; Attendance: 1,100; Referee: Nikolay Yordanov (Sofia)

==== Second legs ====
23 June 2020	Levski Sofia	0−0 (0−2 agg.)	Lokomotiv Plovdiv	Sofia
20:30 EEST		Report		Stadium: Stadion Vivacom Arena - Georgi Asparuhov; Attendance: 3,400; Referee: Nikola Popov (Sofia)

24 June 2020	CSKA Sofia	2−0 (2−0 agg.)	Botev Plovdiv	Sofia
20:30 EEST	Bandalovski 19' (o.g.); Sowe 55'	Report		Stadium: Stadion Balgarska Armia; Attendance: 4,300; Referee: Dragomir Draganov (Varna)

=== Final ===
The final took place at the Vasil Levski National Stadium in Sofia on 1 July 2020. On 27 June the Bulgarian Football Union announced that it is allowed for the stadium to host up to 30% of its total capacity (i.e. 12,000 spectators) with up to 3,000 spectators per block in accordance with the health regulations issued by the Ministry of Health.

1 July 2020
19:15 EEST

CSKA Sofia	0−0 (a.e.t.)	Lokomotiv Plovdiv
	Report
Penalties
Zanev (penalty scored); Sowe (penalty missed); Geferson (penalty scored); Carey (penalty scored)	3−5	(penalty scored) Iliev; (penalty scored) Almeida; (penalty scored) Karagaren; (penalty scored) Malonga; (penalty scored) Tsvetanov

Vasil Levski National Stadium, Sofia
Attendance: 12,000
Referee: Georgi Kabakov (Plovdiv)

== Bracket ==
Round of 32
2	Botev Galabovo	2
1	Etar Veliko Tarnovo	1
2	Chernomorets Balchik	0
1	Vitosha Bistritsa	4
3	Zagorets Nova Zagora	0
1	Slavia Sofia	4
3	Minyor Pernik	1
1	Botev Plovdiv	2
2	Hebar Pazardzhik	0
1	Arda Kardzhali	2
2	Lokomotiv Gorna Oryahovitsa	0
1	CSKA Sofia	3
3	Dobrudzha Dobrich	0
1	Botev Vratsa	4
2	Kariana Erden	3
1	Tsarsko Selo Sofia	0
3	Balkan Botevgrad	0
1	Lokomotiv Plovdiv	3
2	Litex Lovech	3
2	Montana	0
2	Pomorie	0
1	Beroe Stara Zagora	2
2	CSKA 1948 Sofia	2
1	Dunav Ruse	1
2	Spartak Varna	1
1	Levski Sofia	5
3	Botev Ihtiman	0
1	Cherno More Varna	3
2	Spartak Pleven	3
2	Septemvri Sofia	4
2	Neftochimic Burgas	1
1	Ludogorets Razgrad	4

Round of 16
2	Botev Galabovo	2
1	Vitosha Bistritsa	1
1	Slavia Sofia	1
1	Botev Plovdiv	2
1	Arda Kardzhali	0
1	CSKA Sofia	1
1	Botev Vratsa	4
2	Kariana Erden	0
1	Lokomotiv Plovdiv	2
2	Litex Lovech	1
1	Beroe Stara Zagora	3
2	CSKA 1948 Sofia	4
1	Levski Sofia	1
1	Cherno More Varna	0
2	Septemvri Sofia	0
1	Ludogorets Razgrad	3

Quarter-finals
2	Botev Galabovo	0 (0)
1	Botev Plovdiv (a.e.t.)	0 (1)
1	CSKA Sofia	2
1	Botev Vratsa	1
1	Lokomotiv Plovdiv	2
2	CSKA 1948 Sofia	0
1	Levski Sofia (p)	0 (6)
1	Ludogorets Razgrad	0 (5)

Semifinals
1	Botev Plovdiv	0	0
1	CSKA Sofia	0	2
1	Lokomotiv Plovdiv	2	0
1	Levski Sofia	0	0

Final
1	CSKA Sofia	0 (3)
1	Lokomotiv Plovdiv (p)	0 (5)

== Top goalscorers ==
As of 1 July 2020

Rank	Player	Club	Goals
1	(Bulgaria) Dimitar Iliev	Lokomotiv Plovdiv	5
1	(Bulgaria) Eray Karadayi	Botev Galabovo	5
3	(Bulgaria) Denislav Aleksandrov	CSKA 1948 Sofia	4
3	(Republic of the Congo) Mavis Tchibota	Ludogorets Razgrad	4
5	sixteen players		2
