= Borislav Damyanov =

Bulgarian footballer

Personal information
- Full name: Borislav Danielov Damyanov
- Date of birth: 11 April 1998 (age 28)
- Place of birth: Montana, Bulgaria
- Height: 1.79 m (5 ft 10 in)
- Position: Winger

Team information
- Current team: Montana
- Number: 11

Youth career
- –2017: Montana

Senior career*
Years	Team	Apps	(Gls)
2016–2020	Montana	43	(1)
2020	Kariana	15	(4)
2021	CSKA 1948	7	(0)
2021	CSKA 1948 II	1	(0)
2022–	Montana	32	(6)
- * Club domestic league appearances and goals as of 5 June 2024

Borislav Damyanov (Bulgarian: Борислав Дамянов; born 11 April 1998) is a Bulgarian footballer who plays as a winger for Bulgarian Second League club Montana.

== Career ==
Damyanov started his career in the youth ranks of his hometown club Montana. In January 2016, he joined the first team. On 28 May 2016, he made his professional debut in a 1–3 away loss against Slavia Sofia, coming on as substitute for Ivan Kokonov.

== Career statistics ==
As of 15 April 2017

Club performance			League		Cup		Continental		Other		Total	
Club	League	Season	Apps	Goals	Apps	Goals	Apps	Goals	Apps	Goals	Apps	Goals
Bulgaria			League		Bulgarian Cup		Europe		Other (Note: Includes Bulgarian Supercup matches.)		Total	
Montana	A Group	2015–16	1	0	0	0	–		–		1	0
Montana	First League	2016–17	1	0	1	0	–		–		2	0
Montana	Total		2	0	1	0	0	0	0	0	3	0
Career statistics			2	0	1	0	0	0	0	0	3	0
