= Gašević =

Gašević is a surname. Notable people with the surname include:

- Dragan Gašević (born 1976), Bosnian professor
- Ognjen Gašević (born 2002), Montenegrin footballer
