= Kristiyan Nikolov =

Bulgarian footballer

Personal information
- Full name: Kristiyan Angelov Nikolov
- Date of birth: 18 December 2003 (age 22)
- Place of birth: Sofia, Bulgaria
- Height: 1.73 m (5 ft 8 in)
- Position: Forward

Team information
- Current team: Sportist Svoge

Youth career
- –2019: Levski Sofia
- 2020–2021: CSKA 1948
- 2021–2022: Tsarsko Selo

Senior career*
Years	Team	Apps	(Gls)
2020–2021	CSKA 1948	1	(0)
2021–2022	Tsarsko Selo	0	(0)
2022	Granit Vladaya	2	(0)
2023–	Sportist Svoge	0	(0)
- * Club domestic league appearances and goals as of 18:35, 31 October 2020 (UTC) ‡ National team caps and goals as of 18:35, 31 October 2020 (UTC)

Kristiyan Nikolov (Bulgarian: Кристиян Николов; born 18 December 2003) is a Bulgarian footballer who plays as a forward for Sportist Svoge.

== Career ==
Nikolov joined CSKA 1948 coming from the Levski Sofia academy. On 21 October 2020 he made his debut for the team in a cup match against FC Drenovets. 5 days later he completed his professional debut for the team in a league match against Slavia Sofia.

== Career statistics ==
=== Club ===
As of 31 October 2020

Club performance			League		Cup		Continental		Other		Total	
Club	League	Season	Apps	Goals	Apps	Goals	Apps	Goals	Apps	Goals	Apps	Goals
Bulgaria			League		Bulgarian Cup		Europe		Other (Note: Includes Bulgarian Supercup matches.)		Total	
CSKA 1948	First League	2020–21	1	0	1	0	–		–		2	0
CSKA 1948	Total		1	0	1	0	0	0	0	0	1	0
Career statistics			1	0	1	0	0	0	0	0	2	0
