= Yegor Parkhomenko =

Belarusian footballer

Personal information
- Full name: Yegor Anatolyevich Parkhomenko
- Date of birth: 7 January 2003 (age 23)
- Place of birth: Grodno, Belarus
- Height: 1.93 m (6 ft 4 in)
- Position: Defender

Team information
- Current team: Torpedo Moscow
- Number: 22

Youth career
- 2016–2021: Neman Grodno

Senior career*
Years	Team	Apps	(Gls)
2021–2025	Neman Grodno	71	(1)
2021	→ Lida (loan)	15	(0)
2025–2026	CSKA 1948	18	(0)
2026–	Torpedo Moscow	0	(0)

International career^{‡}
2019	Belarus U17	3	(0)
2021	Belarus U19	3	(0)
2023	Belarus U21	2	(0)
2023–	Belarus	10	(0)
- * Club domestic league appearances and goals as of 10 September 2026 ‡ National team caps and goals as of 9 June 2026

Yegor Parkhomenko (Belarusian: Ягор Пархоменка; Russian: Егор Пархоменко; born 7 January 2003) is a Belarusian professional footballer who plays for Russian First League club Torpedo Moscow and the Belarus national team. He has also played for the national U17, U19 and U21 teams.
