= Tsvetomir Todorov =

Bulgarian footballer

Personal information
- Full name: Tsvetomir Mitkov Todorov
- Date of birth: 31 March 1991 (age 35)
- Place of birth: Vidin, Bulgaria
- Height: 1.69 m (5 ft 7 in)
- Positions: Midfielder; forward

Team information
- Current team: Bdin Vidin
- Number: 10

Senior career*
Years	Team	Apps	(Gls)
2009–2010	Bdin Vidin	27	(12)
2010–2011	Minyor Pernik	4	(0)
2011	Bdin Vidin	13	(5)
2012	Slavia Sofia	9	(0)
2013	Riccione 1929	5	(0)
2014–2015	Bdin Vidin	36	(34)
2015–2016	Spartak Pleven	22	(4)
2016–2017	Etar Veliko Tarnovo	37	(8)
2018–2019	Kariana Erden	57	(10)
2020	Strumska Slava	2	(0)
2020	CSKA 1948	1	(0)
2020–	Sozopol	22	(4)
2021–2022	Bdin Vidin	13	(4)
2022	Etar Veliko Tarnovo	13	(1)
2022–	Bdin Vidin	0	(0)
- * Club domestic league appearances and goals as of 13 June 2022

Tsvetomir Todorov (Bulgarian: Цветомир Тодоров; born 31 March 1991) is a Bulgarian footballer who plays as a forward for Bulgarian Third league club Bdin Vidin. He played in the Bulgarian top division for Minyor Pernik and Slavia Sofia.
