= Ognjen Gašević =

Montenegrin footballer

Personal information
- Full name: Ognjen Gašević
- Date of birth: 2 April 2002 (age 24)
- Place of birth: FR Yugoslavia
- Height: 1.81 m (5 ft 11 in)
- Position: Left-back

Team information
- Current team: CSKA 1948
- Number: 22

Youth career
- OFK Mladost DG

Senior career*
Years	Team	Apps	(Gls)
2018	OFK Mladost DG	1	(0)
2018–2021	OFK Titograd	41	(2)
2019	→FK Mornar (loan)	9	(1)
2021–2023	Rudar Pljevlja	66	(3)
2023–2025	Budućnost Podgorica	62	(3)
2025–	CSKA 1948	25	(0)

International career^{‡}
20217	Montenegro U16	2	(0)
2017–2018	Montenegro U17	5	(0)
2019	Montenegro U18	4	(0)
2019–2021	Montenegro U19	10	(0)
2021–2024	Montenegro U21	14	(0)
2024–	Montenegro	8	(0)
- * Club domestic league appearances and goals as of 21:00, 6 June 2026 (UTC) ‡ National team caps and goals as of 13:23, 13 November 2026 (UTC)

Ognjen Gašević (Огњен Гашевић; born 2 April 2002) is a Montenegrin professional footballer who plays as a left-back for Bulgarian First League club CSKA 1948 Sofia.

== Club career ==
Gašević began his senior career at OFK Titograd in the Montenegrin First League, where he made 41 appearances across three seasons and scored 2 goals. In July 2021 he joined Rudar Pljevlja on a free transfer, spending two seasons in Pljevlja and making 66 appearances.

In June 2023, Gašević joined Budućnost Podgorica on a free transfer, where he established himself as a first-choice left back and won the Montenegrin league title and the domestic cup. He was praised for his tireless defensive work during Budućnost's UEFA Conference League qualification campaign, notably standing out in a 2024 play-off against CSKA 1948.

His transfer to CSKA 1948 in August 2025 attracted significant controversy. Budućnost initially rejected CSKA's approach, with club president Boris Spalević publicly criticising the Bulgarian club for bypassing proper transfer protocols and contacting the player directly — a process he described as a violation of FIFA and UEFA regulations. Despite this, CSKA activated a €150,000 buyout clause in Gašević's contract, and his move was confirmed on 28 August 2025. At CSKA, he was reunited with former Budućnost teammate Dragan Grivić, who had made the same move earlier in the summer. In his debut season in Bulgaria, Gašević made 25 appearances as CSKA finished runners-up in the Bulgarian First Professional Football League.

== International career ==
Gašević made his senior debut for the Montenegro national football team on 19 November 2024, appearing in a UEFA Nations League fixture against Turkey, a match Montenegro won 3–1. He earned his second cap on 22 March 2025, featuring in a 2026 World Cup qualifying fixture against Gibraltar, which Montenegro won 3–1.

== Honours ==
Budućnost Podgorica

- Montenegrin First League: 2024–25
