= Angel Rusev (footballer) =

Bulgarian footballer

Personal information
- Full name: Angel Ognyanov Rusev
- Date of birth: 6 January 1981 (age 45)
- Place of birth: Teteven, Bulgaria
- Height: 1.70 m (5 ft 7 in)
- Position: Winger

Team information
- Current team: Kariana Erden
- Number: 15

Youth career
- 1991–2001: Olimpik Teteven

Senior career*
Years	Team	Apps	(Gls)
2002–2004	Litex Lovech	13	(1)
2004–2006	Spartak Pleven	40	(16)
2006	Chernomorets Burgas	11	(0)
2007–2008	Minyor Radnevo	36	(10)
2008–2014	Vidima-Rakovski	137	(38)
2014	Marek Dupnitsa	3	(0)
2015	Botev Vratsa	14	(10)
2016–2017	Kariana Erden	5	(2)
2017-2022	Partizan Cherven Bryag	1	(0)
- * Club domestic league appearances and goals as of 29 March 2016

Angel Rusev (Bulgarian: Ангел Русев; born 6 January 1981) is a former Bulgarian footballer who last played as a midfielder for Partizan Cherven Bryag.

In 2024, Rusev won fourth European Weightlifting title in the 55-kg category.
