= José Martines =

Bolivian footballer

Personal information
- Full name: José Carlos Martines Garzón
- Date of birth: 18 September 2002 (age 24)
- Place of birth: San Javier, Ñuflo de Chávez, Bolivia
- Height: 1.75 m (5 ft 9 in)
- Position: Winger

Team information
- Current team: CSKA 1948
- Number: 17

Youth career
- Always Ready

Senior career*
| Years | Team | Apps | (Gls) |
| 2019–2025 | Always Ready | 72 | (12) |
| 2025 | Bulo Bulo | 8 | (3) |
| 2025– | CSKA 1948 | 19 | (2) |

International career^{‡}
| 2023– | Bolivia U23 | | |
| 2023– | Bolivia | 4 | (0) |
- * Club domestic league appearances and goals as of 8 August 2026 ‡ National team caps and goals as of 30 September 2026

José Carlos Martines Garzón (born 18 September 2002), known as José Martines, is a Bolivian professional footballer who plays as a winger for Bulgarian First League club CSKA 1948 Sofia and the Bolivia national team.

== Club career ==
Born in San Javier, Bolivia, Martines started his career with Always Ready in the Bolivian top level. With them, he has taken part in the 2024 Copa Sudamericana.

== International career ==
On 27 August 2023, Martines made his senior debut with Bolivia in the 1–2 loss against Panama.

In December 2023, Martines represented the Bolivia under-23 team in friendly matches against Peru.

In September 2024, Martines received another call-up to the senior team under Óscar Villegas for the 2026 FIFA World Cup qualifiers against Colombia and Argentina.

== Career statistics ==
=== Club ===
As of match played 8 August 2026

Appearances and goals by club, season and competition
| Club | Season | League | | | National cup | | Continental | | Other | | Total | |
| Club | Season | Division | Apps | Goals | Apps | Goals | Apps | Goals | Apps | Goals | Apps | Goals |
|---|---|---|---|---|---|---|---|---|---|---|---|---|
| Always Ready | 2019 | FBF División Profesional | 1 | 0 | — | | — | | — | | 1 | 0 |
| Always Ready | 2021 | FBF División Profesional | 6 | 0 | — | | — | | — | | 6 | 0 |
| Always Ready | 2022 | FBF División Profesional | 9 | 0 | — | | 0 | 0 | — | | 9 | 0 |
| Always Ready | 2023 | FBF División Profesional | 27 | 5 | 10 | 4 | 0 | 0 | — | | 37 | 9 |
| Always Ready | 2024 | FBF División Profesional | 29 | 7 | 0 | 0 | 7 (Note: One appearance in Copa Libertadores, six appearances and two goals in Copa Sudamericana) | 2 | — | | 36 | 9 |
| Always Ready | Total | | 71 | 12 | 10 | 4 | 7 | 2 | — | | 88 | 18 |
| Bulo Bulo | 2025 | FBF División Profesional | 8 | 3 | 0 | 0 | 6 (Note: Appearances in Copa Libertadores) | 0 | — | | 14 | 3 |
| CSKA 1948 | 2025–26 | First League | 16 | 2 | 2 | 0 | — | | — | | 18 | 2 |
| CSKA 1948 | 2026–27 | First League | 3 | 0 | 0 | 0 | 2 (Note: Appearances in UEFA Conference League) | 0 | — | | 5 | 0 |
| CSKA 1948 | Total | | 19 | 2 | 2 | 0 | 2 | 0 | — | | 23 | 2 |
| Career total | | | 98 | 17 | 12 | 4 | 15 | 2 | 0 | 0 | 125 | 23 |

=== International ===
As of match played 30 September 2026

| National team | Year | Apps | Goals |
|---|---|---|---|
| Bolivia | 2023 | 1 | 0 |
| Bolivia | 2025 | 2 | 0 |
| Bolivia | 2026 | 1 | 0 |
| Total | | 4 | 0 |
