= Mihail Minkov =

Bulgarian footballer

Personal information
- Full name: Mihail Atanasov Minkov
- Date of birth: 6 February 1993 (age 33)
- Place of birth: Bansko, Bulgaria
- Height: 1.84 m (6 ft 0 in)
- Positions: Centre back; right back

Team information
- Current team: Sevlievo
- Number: 55

Youth career
- 1999–2011: Vidima-Rakovski

Senior career*
Years	Team	Apps	(Gls)
2011–2013	Vidima-Rakovski	31	(2)
2013–2014	Kaliakra	15	(0)
2014	Oborishte		
2015	Bansko	5	(0)
2015–2017	Etar	42	(2)
2017–2018	Litex Lovech	17	(0)
2018	Dobrudzha Dobrich	14	(1)
2019	Lokomotiv GO	26	(3)
2020–2021	CSKA 1948	16	(0)
2021–2022	CSKA 1948 II	26	(0)
2022	Montana	8	(0)
2023	Yantra Gabrovo	16	(3)
2023–2024	Litex Lovech	30	(1)
2024–2025	Lokomotiv GO	54	(4)
2026–	Sevlievo	13	(0)
- * Club domestic league appearances and goals as of 11 June 2026

Mihail Atanasov Minkov (Bulgarian: Михаил Атанасов Минков; born 6 February 1993) is a Bulgarian professional footballer who plays as a defender for Sevlievo.

== Career ==
Minkov is a product of the Vidima-Rakovski Sevlievo academy and it was there that he made his A PFG debut.

In July 2015, Minkov joined Etar Veliko Tarnovo. On 15 August 2017, his contract was terminated by mutual consent. On 16 August 2017, Minkov signed with Litex Lovech.

In June 2018, Minkov joined Dobrudzha Dobrich.
