= Kargıcak =

- Neighbourhood
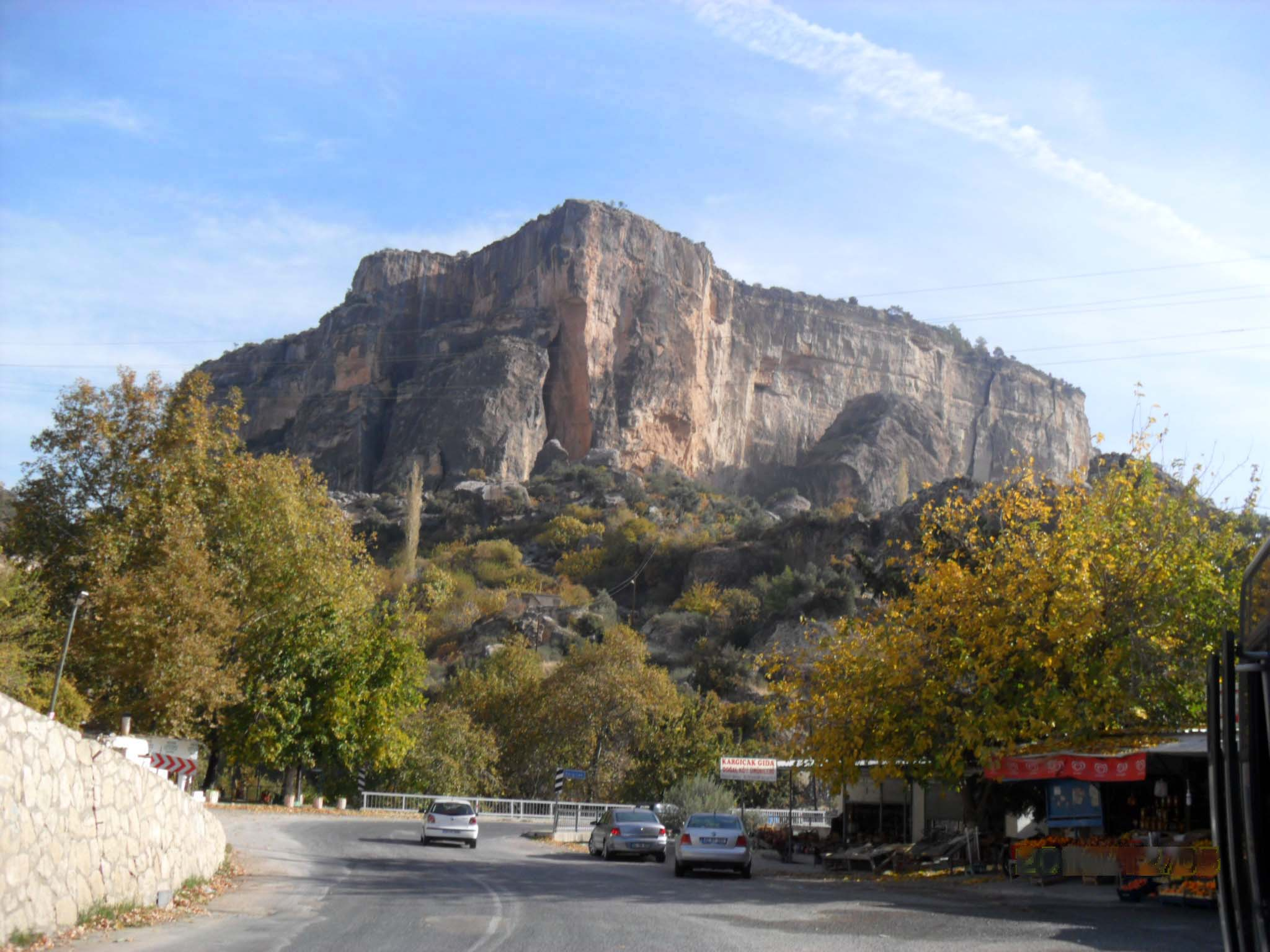

- Location within Turkey
- Coordinates: 36°26′N 33°39′E
- Country: Turkey
- Province: Mersin
- District: Silifke
- Elevation: 190 m (620 ft)
- Population (2022): 316
- Time zone: UTC+3 (TRT)
- Postal code: 33940
- Area code: 0324

Kargıcak is a neighbourhood in the municipality and district of Silifke, Mersin Province, Turkey. Its population is 316 (2022). It is situated to the east of Göksu River valley. Distance to Silifke is 35 kilometres (22 mi) and to Mersin is 120 kilometres (75 mi). The main economic activity is farming. The village produces olives and various fruits like figs and grapes. Kargıcak is on the state highway D.715 and being a convenient stop, small trade contributes to village economy.
