= 2021 Bulgarian parliamentary election =

2021 Bulgarian parliamentary election may refer to:

- April 2021 Bulgarian parliamentary election
- July 2021 Bulgarian parliamentary election
- November 2021 Bulgarian parliamentary election
