= Mario Ivov =

Bulgarian footballer (born 1999)

Personal information
- Full name: Mario Valentinov Ivov
- Birth name: Mario Magdalinov Topuzov
- Date of birth: 25 July 1999 (age 27)
- Place of birth: Blagoevgrad, Bulgaria
- Height: 1.73 m (5 ft 8 in)
- Position: Midfielder

Team information
- Current team: Vihren Sandanski
- Number: 8

Youth career
- –2016: Litex Lovech
- 2016–2018: Pirin Blagoevgrad

Senior career*
Years	Team	Apps	(Gls)
2017–2018	Pirin Blagoevgrad	16	(0)
2019–2020	Septemvri Simitli	32	(10)
2020–2024	CSKA 1948	90	(3)
2021–2024	CSKA 1948 II	21	(4)
2023	→ Steaua București (loan)	7	(0)
2025	Pirin Blagoevgrad	31	(4)
2026–	Vihren	13	(3)

International career
2017	Bulgaria U18	1	(0)
- * Club domestic league appearances and goals as of 11 June 2026

Mario Valentinov Ivov (Bulgarian: Марио Валентинов Ивов; born 25 July 1999) is a Bulgarian footballer who currently plays as a midfielder for Vihren.

== Career ==
=== Pirin Blagoevgrad ===
In June 2016, Topuzov started pre-season training with Pirin Blagoevgrad's first team. On 5 March 2017, he made his professional debut in a 0–3 away loss against Ludogorets Razgrad, coming on as substitute for Stanislav Kostov.

== Personal life ==
In February 2025 he changed his name to Mario Vladimirov Ivov, taking his father's name. Until that, he used his mother's name and was known as Mario Magdalinov Topuzov.
