= Angel Bastunov =

Bulgarian footballer

Personal information
- Full name: Angel Georgiev Bastunov
- Date of birth: 18 May 1999 (age 27)
- Place of birth: Razlog, Bulgaria
- Height: 1.83 m (6 ft 0 in)
- Position: Midfielder

Team information
- Current team: Vizela
- Number: 8

Youth career
- 2011–2013: Levski Sofia
- 2013–2015: Septemvri Sofia
- 2015–2018: Botev Plovdiv

Senior career*
Years	Team	Apps	(Gls)
2017–2018	Botev Plovdiv	0	(0)
2018–2020	Kariana Erden	43	(4)
2020–2023	CSKA 1948	83	(10)
2021–2023	CSKA 1948 II	15	(3)
2023–2024	Hebar	33	(4)
2024–	Vizela	53	(3)
- * Club domestic league appearances and goals as of 19 June 2026

Angel Bastunov (Bulgarian: Ангел Бастунов; born 18 May 1999) is a Bulgarian professional footballer who plays as a midfielder for Portuguese side Vizela.
