= Ivaylo Klimentov =

Bulgarian footballer (born 1998)

Personal information
- Full name: Ivaylo Georgiev Klimentov
- Date of birth: 3 February 1998 (age 28)
- Place of birth: Batak, Bulgaria
- Height: 1.80 m (5 ft 11 in)
- Position: Midfielder

Team information
- Current team: Chernomorets Burgas
- Number: 4

Youth career
- 2011–2013: Gimnàstic de Tarragona
- 2013–2014: Valencia
- 2014–2017: Ludogorets Razgrad

Senior career*
Years	Team	Apps	(Gls)
2015–2019	Ludogorets Razgrad II	72	(8)
2016–2019	Ludogorets Razgrad	5	(1)
2018	→ Vitosha Bistritsa (loan)	3	(0)
2019–2022	CSKA 1948	55	(3)
2021–2022	CSKA 1948 II	8	(1)
2022–2023	Spartak Varna	25	(1)
2023–2025	Dobrudzha Dobrich	60	(4)
2025–2026	Vihren Sandanski	21	(2)
2026–	Chernomorets Burgas	8	(1)

International career
2015–2016	Bulgaria U17	3	(1)
2016–2017	Bulgaria U19	12	(0)
- * Club domestic league appearances and goals as of 11 June 2026

Ivaylo Klimentov (Bulgarian: Ивайло Климентов; born 3 February 1998) is a Bulgarian professional footballer who plays as a midfielder for Second League club Chernomorets Burgas.

== Career ==
=== Ludogorets Razgrad ===
Klimentov joined Ludogorets Razgrad in 2014 after arriving from the Spanish Gimnàstic de Tarragona.

He made his debut for Ludogorets II on 17 March 2016. 2 months later on 27 May 2016 in a match against Botev Plovdiv he also made his debut for Ludogorets' main team. Klimentov started the 2017–18 season at Ludogorets II by scoring his debut goal for the team in the first match of the season against Lokomotiv 1929 Sofia.

He scored his first goal for Ludogorets on 20 May 2018 in the last league match for the season against Botev Plovdiv and later was nominated as Man of the match.

On 6 July 2018, Klimentov was loaned to Vitosha Bistritsa until the end of the season.

=== Spartak Varna ===
In July 2022 Klimentov joined Spartak Varna on a two-year contract.

== International career ==
=== Youth levels ===
Klimentov was called up for the Bulgaria U19 team for the 2017 European Under-19 Championship qualification from 22 to 27 March 2017. After a draw and 2 wins the team qualified for the knockout phase which was held in July 2017.

== Career statistics ==
=== Club ===
As of 21 May 2018

Club performance			League		Cup		Continental		Other		Total	
Club	League	Season	Apps	Goals	Apps	Goals	Apps	Goals	Apps	Goals	Apps	Goals
Bulgaria			League		Bulgarian Cup		Europe		Other (Note: Includes Bulgarian Supercup matches.)		Total	
Ludogorets Razgrad II	B Group	2015–16	2	0	–		–		–		2	0
Ludogorets Razgrad II	Second League	2016–17	23	0	–		–		–		23	0
Ludogorets Razgrad II	Second League	2017–18	25	4	–		–		–		25	4
Ludogorets Razgrad II	Total		50	4	0	0	0	0	0	0	50	4
Ludogorets Razgrad	A Group	2015–16	1	0	0	0	0	0	0	0	1	0
Ludogorets Razgrad	First League	2016–17	1	0	1	0	0	0	—		2	0
Ludogorets Razgrad	First League	2017–18	3	1	0	0	0	0	—		3	1
Ludogorets Razgrad	Total		5	1	1	0	0	0	0	0	6	1
Career statistics			55	5	1	0	0	0	0	0	56	5

== Honours ==
=== Club ===
Ludogorets

- First Professional Football League (3): 2015–16, 2016–17, 2017-18

CSKA 1948

- Second Professional Football League (1): 2019–20
