= Dragan Grivić =

Montenegrin footballer

Personal information
- Date of birth: 12 February 1996 (age 30)
- Height: 1.77 m (5 ft 10 in)
- Position: Right-back

Team information
- Current team: CSKA 1948
- Number: 96

Youth career
- Grbalj

Senior career*
Years	Team	Apps	(Gls)
2013–2018	Grbalj	79	(8)
2018–2024	Sutjeska	141	(20)
2024–2025	Budućnost	29	(4)
2025–	CSKA 1948	18	(1)

International career^{‡}
2014–2015	Montenegro U19	9	(0)
2016–2018	Montenegro U21	7	(0)
2021–	Montenegro	1	(0)
- * Club domestic league appearances and goals as of 10:23, 31 May 2026 (UTC) ‡ National team caps and goals as of 25 May 2021

Dragan Grivić (born 12 February 1996) is a Montenegrin professional footballer who plays as a right-back for Bulgarian First League club CSKA 1948 Sofia.

== International career ==
He made his debut for Montenegro national football team on 5 June 2021 in a friendly against Israel. He played the full game in a 1–3 home loss.
