= Aleksandar Aleksandrov (footballer, born 1972) =

Bulgarian footballer (born 1972)

Personal information
- Full name: Aleksandar Todorov Aleksandrov
- Date of birth: 3 January 1972 (age 54)
- Place of birth: Sofia, Bulgaria
- Height: 1.79 m (5 ft 10 in)
- Position: Midfielder

Senior career*
Years	Team	Apps	(Gls)
1990	Montana		
1991–1994	CSKA Sofia	7	(0)
1991–1992	→ Chernomorets (loan)		
1992–1993	→ Sliven (loan)		
1994	→ Spartak Pleven (loan)		
1994–1995	Sliven		
1995–1996	Levski Kyustendil		
1996–1997	Dobrudzha Dobrich		
1997–1998	Lokomotiv Plovdiv	14	(3)
1998–1999	CSKA Sofia	2	(0)
1999–2001	SR Delémont	12	(1)
2005–2006	Montana		
2008–2010	Botev Krivodol	25	(2)
2011–2013	Le Mont	28	(5)
2013–2014	Dardania Lausanne	15	(1)
- * Club domestic league appearances and goals

Aleksandar Aleksandrov (Bulgarian: Александър Александров; born 3 January 1972), nicknamed Wosz, is a former Bulgarian footballer who played as a midfielder.
