= Angel Lyaskov =

Bulgarian footballer

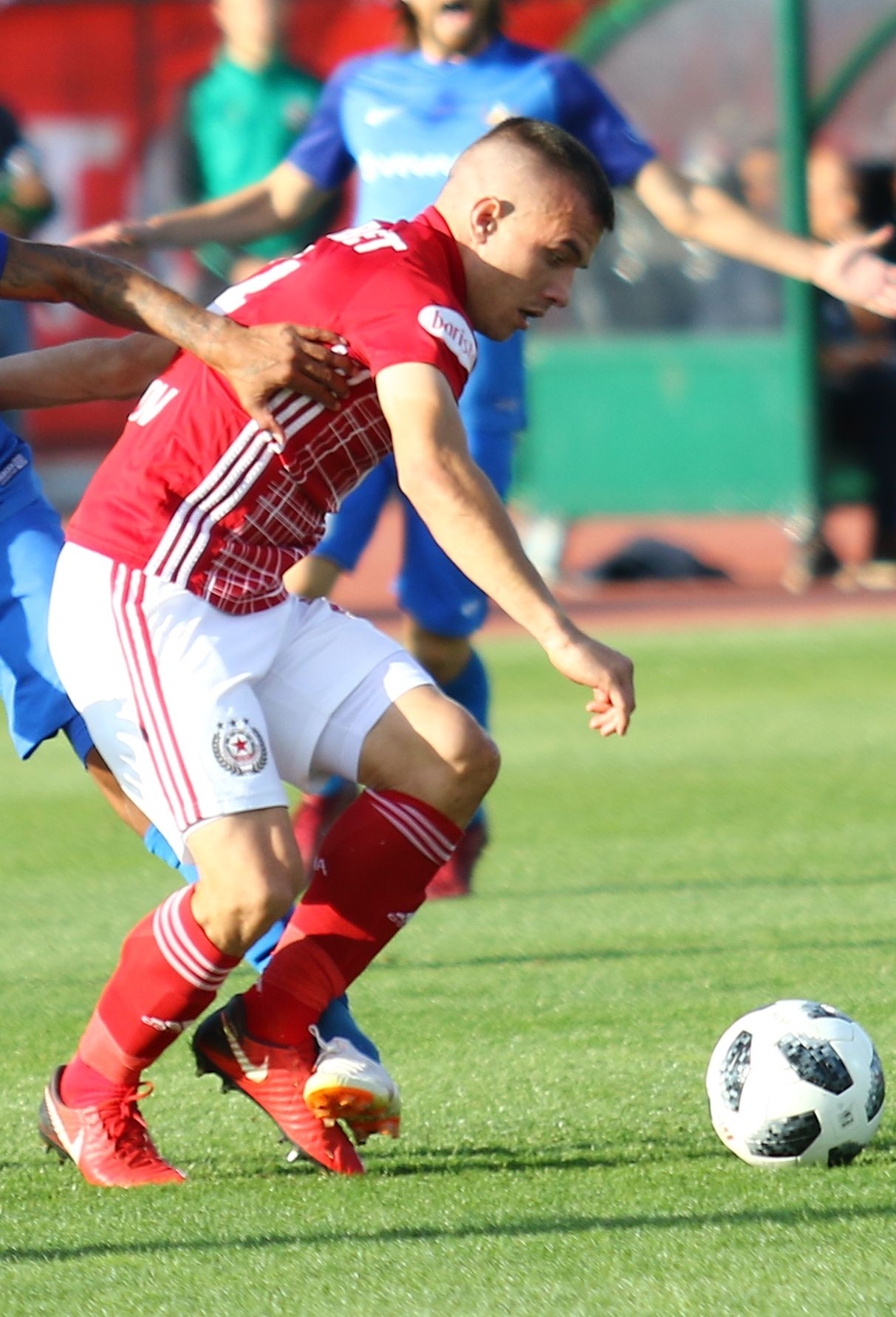

Personal information
- Full name: Angel Stefanov Lyaskov
- Date of birth: 16 March 1998 (age 28)
- Place of birth: Gotse Delchev, Bulgaria
- Height: 1.80 m (5 ft 11 in)
- Position: Left-back

Team information
- Current team: Lokomotiv Sofia
- Number: 14

Youth career
- 2008–2016: Litex Lovech

Senior career*
Years	Team	Apps	(Gls)
2015–2016	Litex Lovech II	7	(0)
2016–2017	CSKA Sofia II	23	(2)
2017–2020	CSKA Sofia	14	(0)
2017–2018	→ Litex Lovech (loan)	28	(1)
2019–2020	→ Botev Vratsa (loan)	21	(0)
2020–2021	Olimpija Ljubljana	4	(0)
2021–2023	CSKA 1948	42	(0)
2021–2023	CSKA 1948 II	8	(0)
2023–2025	Lokomotiv Plovdiv	62	(2)
2025–	Lokomotiv Sofia	29	(1)

International career^{‡}
2015–2017	Bulgaria U19 (Note: Official UEFA competitive matches only.)	12	(0)
2018–2020	Bulgaria U21	12	(0)
2018–	Bulgaria	2	(0)
- * Club domestic league appearances and goals as of 11 June 2026 ‡ National team caps and goals as of 8 June 2024

Angel Lyaskov (Bulgarian: Ангел Лясков; born 16 March 1998) is a Bulgarian professional footballer who plays as a defender for First League club Lokomotiv Sofia.

== International career ==
Lyaskov received his first call-up for the senior Bulgarian squad on 29 August 2018 for the UEFA Nations League matches against Slovenia and Norway on 6 and 9 September. He made his debut in the 2–1 away win over Slovenia, coming on as a substitute for Vasil Bozhikov in the 46th minute.

== Career statistics ==
=== Club ===
As of match played 18 October 2020

Appearances and goals by club, season and competition
Club	Season	League			Cup		Continental		Other		Total	
Club	Season	Division	Apps	Goals	Apps	Goals	Apps	Goals	Apps	Goals	Apps	Goals
Litex Lovech II	2015–16	B Group	7	0	—		—		—		7	0
CSKA Sofia II	2016–17	Second League	23	2	—		—		—		23	2
Litex (loan)	2017–18	Second League	28	1	3	0	—		—		31	1
CSKA Sofia	2018–19	First League	14	0	1	0	3	0	—		18	0
Botev Vratsa (loan)	2019–20	First League	21	0	2	0	—		—		23	0
Olimpija Ljubljana	2020–21	PrvaLiga	4	0	0	0	2	0	—		6	0
Career total			97	3	6	0	5	0	0	0	108	3

=== International ===
As of match played 6 June 2024

Bulgaria national team
Year	Apps	Goals
2018	1	0
2024	1	0
Total	2	0
