= Galin Ivanov (footballer, born 1988) =

Bulgarian footballer

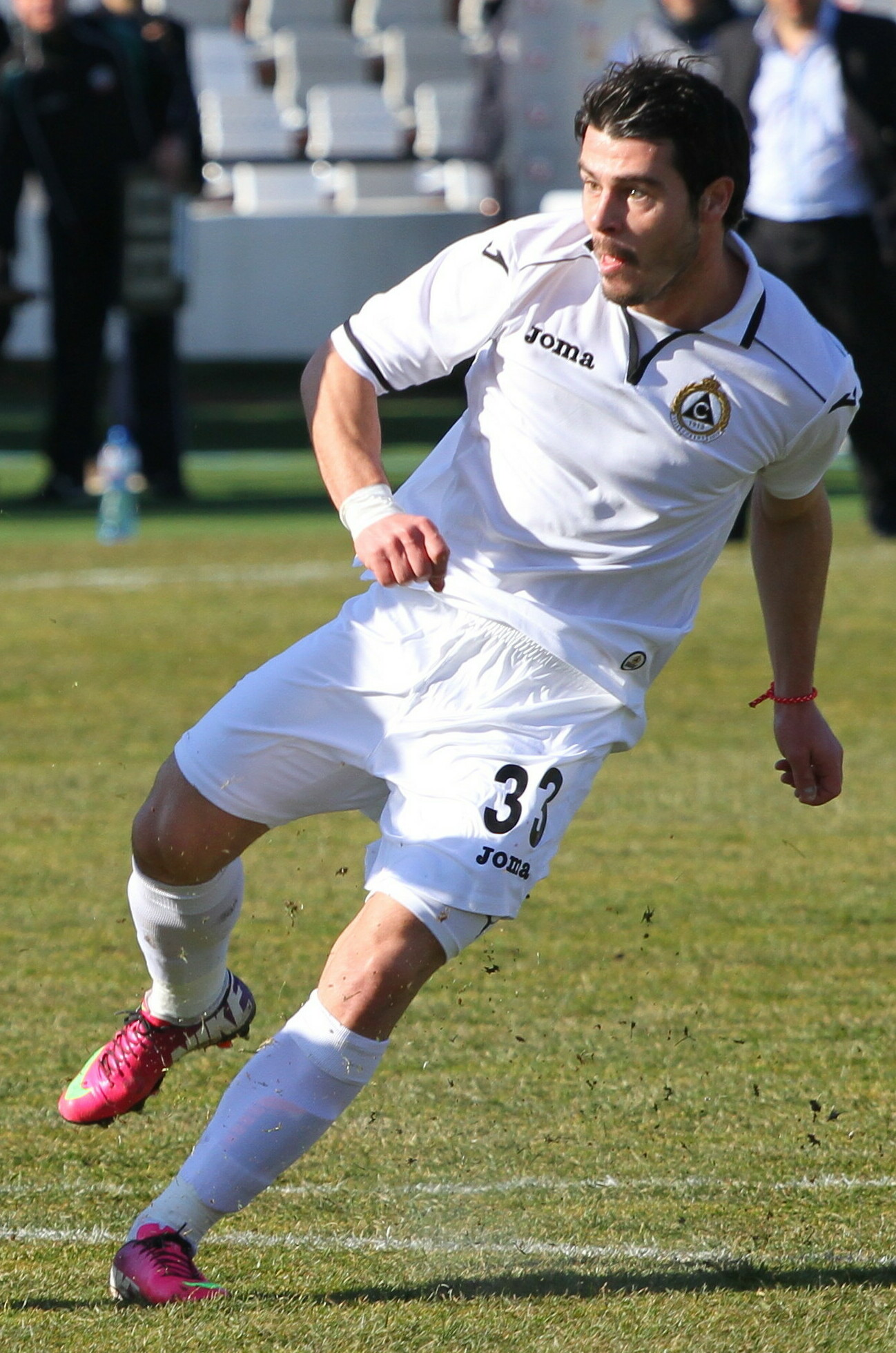
- Ivanov with Slavia Sofia in 2013

Personal information
- Full name: Galin Stefanov Ivanov
- Date of birth: 15 April 1988 (age 38)
- Place of birth: Kazanlak, Bulgaria
- Height: 1.78 m (5 ft 10 in)
- Positions: Attacking midfielder; winger

Team information
- Current team: Septemvri Sofia
- Number: 33

Youth career
- –2000: Rozova Dolina
- 2000–2005: Trayana Stara Zagora
- 2006: Levski Sofia

Senior career*
Years	Team	Apps	(Gls)
2006	Levski Sofia	1	(0)
2006–2007	Beroe Stara Zagora	25	(1)
2008–2014	Slavia Sofia	128	(25)
2011	→ Arminia Bielefeld (loan)	8	(0)
2012	→ Litex Lovech (loan)	22	(5)
2014	Khazar Lankaran	15	(6)
2015–2016	Samsunspor	17	(2)
2016	Levski Sofia	3	(0)
2017	Neftochimic Burgas	15	(5)
2017–2018	Slavia Sofia	44	(12)
2019	Haladás	13	(2)
2019–2020	Slavia Sofia	26	(7)
2020–2022	CSKA 1948	49	(18)
2022–2024	Slavia Sofia	82	(9)
2025–	Septemvri Sofia	50	(5)

International career^{‡}
- Bulgaria U19
2008–2009	Bulgaria U21	3	(0)
2016–2020	Bulgaria	16	(1)
- * Club domestic league appearances and goals as of 26 May 2026 ‡ National team caps and goals as of 15 November 2020

Galin Ivanov (Bulgarian: Галин Иванов; born 15 April 1988) is a Bulgarian professional footballer, who plays as an attacking midfielder for Septemvri Sofia.

His former clubs include Beroe Stara Zagora, Slavia Sofia, Levski Sofia and Arminia Bielefeld.

== Career ==
In June 2014, Ivanov signed for Azerbaijan Premier League side FK Khazar Lankaran. In February 2015, he became part of the Samsunspor team in Turkey on a one-and-a-half-year contract.

In September 2016, Ivanov joined Levski Sofia, signing a short-term contract which was not renewed.

On 12 February 2017, Ivanov signed with Neftochimic Burgas.

On 18 August 2017, Ivanov returned to Slavia Sofia, signing a short-term contract.

After spending two years with CSKA 1948, he once again returned to Slavia Sofia in the summer of 2022. In January 2025, Ivanov joined Septemvri Sofia on a one-and-a-half year contract.

== International career ==
Ivanov earned his first cap for the senior national football team of his country on 3 June 2016, after coming on as a second-half substitute for Mihail Aleksandrov in the 2–7 loss against Japan in a semi-final of the 2016 Kirin Cup.

=== International goals ===
Scores and results list Bulgaria's goal tally first.

No	Date	Venue	Opponent	Score	Result	Competition
1.	19 November 2018	Vasil Levski National Stadium, Sofia, Bulgaria	Slovenia	1–0	1–1	2018–19 UEFA Nations League C

== Career statistics ==
=== Club ===
As of 9 December 2024

Club performance			League		Cup		Continental		Other		Total	
Club	Season	League	Apps	Goals	Apps	Goals	Apps	Goals	Apps	Goals	Apps	Goals
Bulgaria			League (Note: Includes play-off matches, where applicable.)		Bulgarian Cup		Europe		Other (Note: Includes Bulgarian Supercup matches.)		Total	
Levski Sofia	2005–06	A Group	1	0	0	0	0	0	–		1	0
Beroe Stara Zagora	2006–07	A Group	11	0	2	0	–		–		13	0
Beroe Stara Zagora	2007–08	A Group	14	1	1	0	–		–		15	1
Beroe Stara Zagora	Total		25	1	3	0	0	0	0	0	28	1
Slavia Sofia	2008–09	A Group	26	3	1	0	–		–		27	3
Slavia Sofia	2009–10	A Group	28	2	1	1	–		–		29	3
Slavia Sofia	2010–11	A Group	13	3	1	0	–		–		14	3
Slavia Sofia	2011–12	A Group	14	2	0	0	–		–		14	2
Slavia Sofia	2012–13	A Group	13	6	2	0	–		–		15	6
Slavia Sofia	2013–14	A Group	34	9	3	1	–		–		37	10
Slavia Sofia	Total		128	25	8	2	0	0	0	0	136	27
Arminia Bielefeld (loan)	2010–11	2. Bundesliga	8	0	0	0	–		–		8	0
Litex Lovech (loan)	2011–12	A Group	11	4	2	0	0	0	–		13	4
Litex Lovech (loan)	2012–13	A Group	11	1	1	0	–		–		12	1
Litex Lovech (loan)	Total		22	5	3	1	0	0	0	0	25	5
Khazar Lankaran	2014–15	Premyer Liqası	15	6	0	0	–		–		15	6
Samsunspor	2014–15	1. Lig	8	1	0	0	–		–		8	1
Samsunspor	2015–16	1. Lig	9	1	0	0	–		–		9	1
Samsunspor	Total		17	2	0	0	0	0	0	0	17	2
Levski Sofia	2016–17	First League	3	0	1	0	0	0	–		4	0
Neftochimic Burgas	2016–17	First League	15	5	0	0	–		–		15	5
Slavia Sofia	2017–18	First League	25	9	6	1	–		–		31	10
Slavia Sofia	2018–19	First League	19	3	1	2	4	3	1	0	25	8
Slavia Sofia	Total		44	12	7	3	4	3	1	0	56	18
Haladás	2018–19	NB I	13	2	2	0	–		–		15	2
Slavia Sofia	2019–20	First League	26	7	2	0	–		–		28	7
CSKA 1948 Sofia	2020–21	First League	21	9	1	0	–		–		22	9
CSKA 1948 Sofia	2021–22	First League	28	9	1	0	–		–		29	9
CSKA 1948 Sofia	Total		49	18	2	0	0	0	0	0	51	18
Slavia Sofia	2022–23	First League	32	4	3	0	–		–		35	4
Slavia Sofia	2023–24	First League	32	5	2	1	–		–		34	6
Slavia Sofia	2024–25	First League	18	0	2	0	–		–		20	0
Slavia Sofia	Total		82	9	7	1	0	0	0	0	89	10
Career statistics			448	92	35	6	4	3	1	0	488	101

== Honours ==
Slavia Sofia

- Bulgarian Cup: 2017–18
