= Andon Gushterov =

Bulgarian footballer (born 1990)

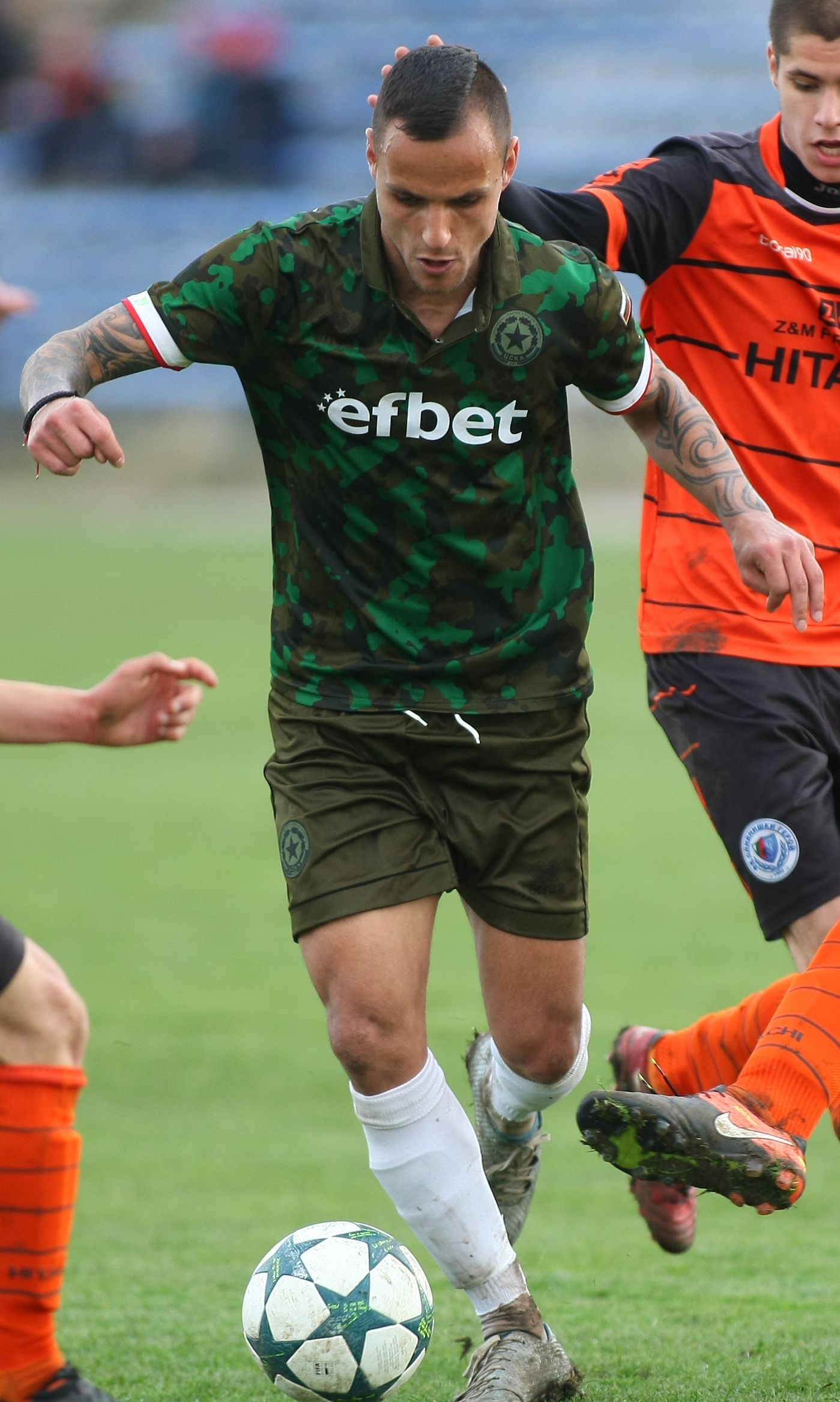

Personal information
- Full name: Andon Aleksandrov Gushterov
- Date of birth: 16 February 1990 (age 36)
- Place of birth: Petrich, Bulgaria
- Height: 1.80 m (5 ft 11 in)
- Positions: Winger; forward

Youth career
- Belasitsa Petrich

Senior career*
Years	Team	Apps	(Gls)
2008	Belasitsa Petrich	2	(0)
2009	Slavia Sofia	3	(0)
2009–2010	Volov Shumen	25	(4)
2010–2011	Vihren Sandanski	27	(6)
2011–2012	Septemvri Simitli	21	(7)
2012	Montana	0	(0)
2013	Septemvri Simitli	9	(1)
2013	Lyubimets 2007	3	(0)
2013–2014	Pirin Blagoevgrad	9	(0)
2014–2015	Septemvri Simitli	27	(7)
2015	Neftochimic Burgas	6	(0)
2016–2017	Septemvri Simitli	42	(23)
2017–2020	CSKA 1948	89	(68)
2021	Pirin Blagoevgrad	11	(1)
2021	Levski Lom	20	(1)
2022–2023	Chavdar Etropole	46	(23)
2023	Marek Dupnitsa	16	(1)
2023–2026	Belasitsa Petrich	48	(4)
- * Club domestic league appearances and goals as of 5 March 2026

Andon Aleksandrov Gushterov (Bulgarian: Андон Александров Гущеров; born 16 February 1990) is a Bulgarian footballer who plays as a forward.

== Career ==
On 15 March 2012, Gushterov scored the first goal for Septemvri Simitli in the historic 2–1 victory against Bulgarian powerhouse CSKA Sofia in the quarter-finals of the Bulgarian Cup. In early July 2012, he signed a two-year contract with A PFG club Montana, but was unable to establish himself as part of the first team and left the club in late November.

On 1 August 2017, Gushterov signed with CSKA 1948.

In December 2023, he joined hometown club Belasitsa Petrich.

== Career statistics ==
=== Club ===
As of 8 December 2020

Club performance			League		Cup		Continental		Total	
Club	League	Season	Apps	Goals	Apps	Goals	Apps	Goals	Apps	Goals
Bulgaria			League		Bulgarian Cup		Europe		Total	
Belasitsa Petrich	A Group	2008–09	2	0	1	0	–		3	0
Slavia Sofia	A Group	2008–09	3	0	0	0	–		3	0
Volov Shumen	B Group	2009–10	25	4	0	0	–		25	4
Vihren Sandanski	B Group	2010–11	27	6	0	0	–		27	6
Septemvri Simitli	B Group	2011–12	21	7	3	2	–		24	9
Montana	A Group	2012–13	0	0	0	0	–		0	0
Septemvri Simitli	B Group	2012–13	9	1	0	0	–		9	1
Lyubimets 2007	A Group	2013–14	3	0	0	0	–		3	0
Pirin Blagoevgrad	V Group	2013–14	9	0	0	0	–		9	0
Septemvri Simitli	B Group	2014–15	27	7	1	0	–		28	7
Neftochimic Burgas	B Group	2015–16	6	0	1	0	–		7	0
Septemvri Simitli	B Group	2015–16	12	1	0	0	–		12	1
Septemvri Simitli	Third League	2016–17	30	22	0	0	–		30	22
Septemvri Simitli	Total		99	38	4	2	0	0	180	50
CSKA 1948	Third League	2017–18	30	22	0	0	–		30	22
CSKA 1948	Second League	2018–19	29	20	1	1	–		30	21
CSKA 1948	Second League	2019–20	20	26	2	2	–		22	28
CSKA 1948	First League	2020–21	10	0	1	1	–		11	1
CSKA 1948	Total		89	68	4	4	0	0	93	72
Career statistics			263	116	10	6	0	0	273	122
