= Erden, Bulgaria =

Coordinates: 43°29′01″N 023°17′22″E

Erden (Bulgarian: Ерден) is a village in northwestern Bulgaria, located in the Boychinovtsi municipality of the Montana Province.
