= Stanislav Todorov =

Bulgarian international referee (born 1976)

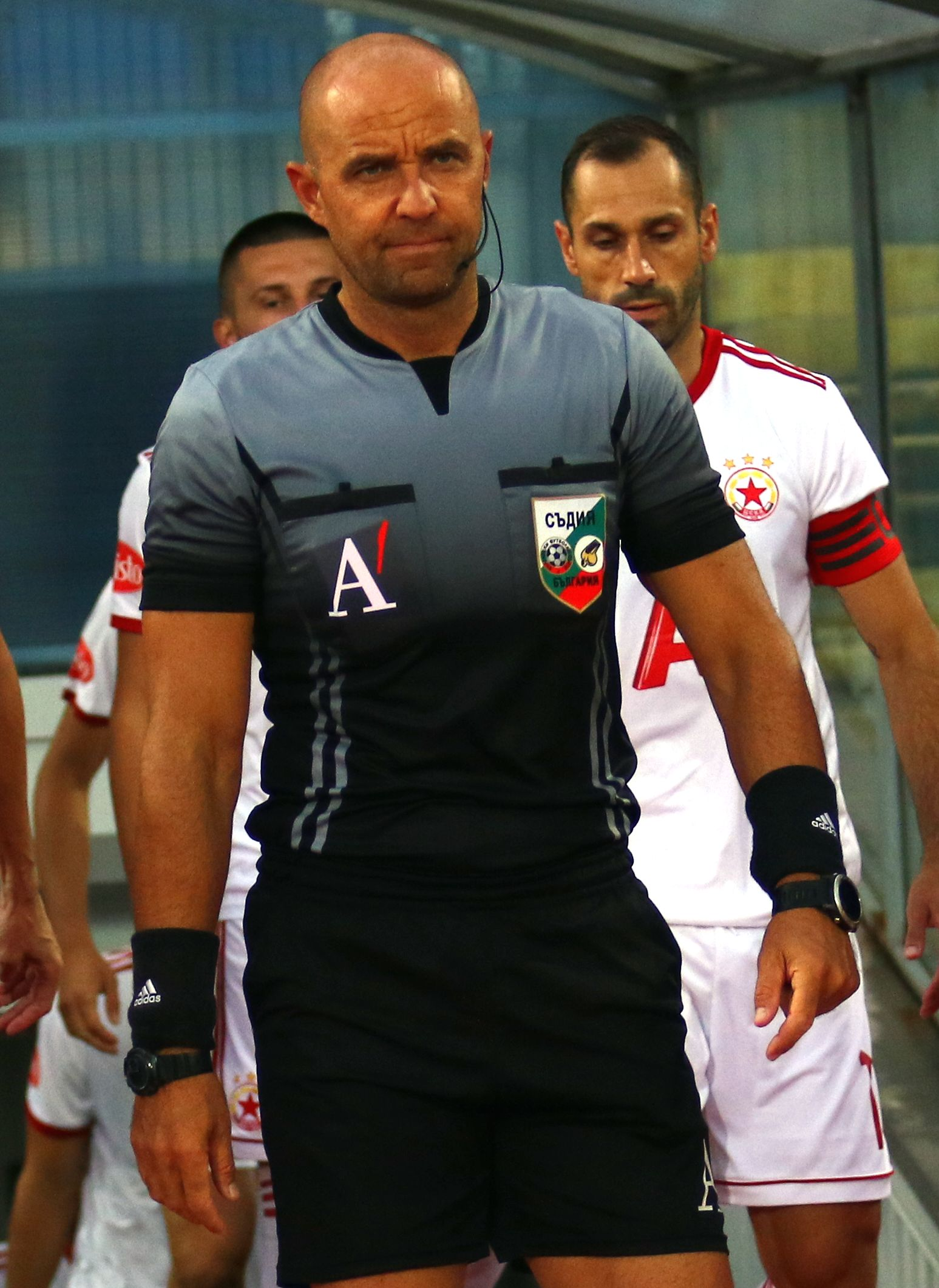
- Full name: Stanislav Todorov
- Born: 7 September 1976 (age 50); Shumen, Bulgaria

Domestic
| Years | League | Role |

International
| Years | League | Role |
| 2006– | FIFA listed | Referee |

Stanislav Todorov (Bulgarian: Станислав Тодоров; born 7 September 1976) is a Bulgarian international referee who has refereed 2014 FIFA World Cup qualifiers.
