= Denislav Aleksandrov =

Bulgarian footballer (born 1997)

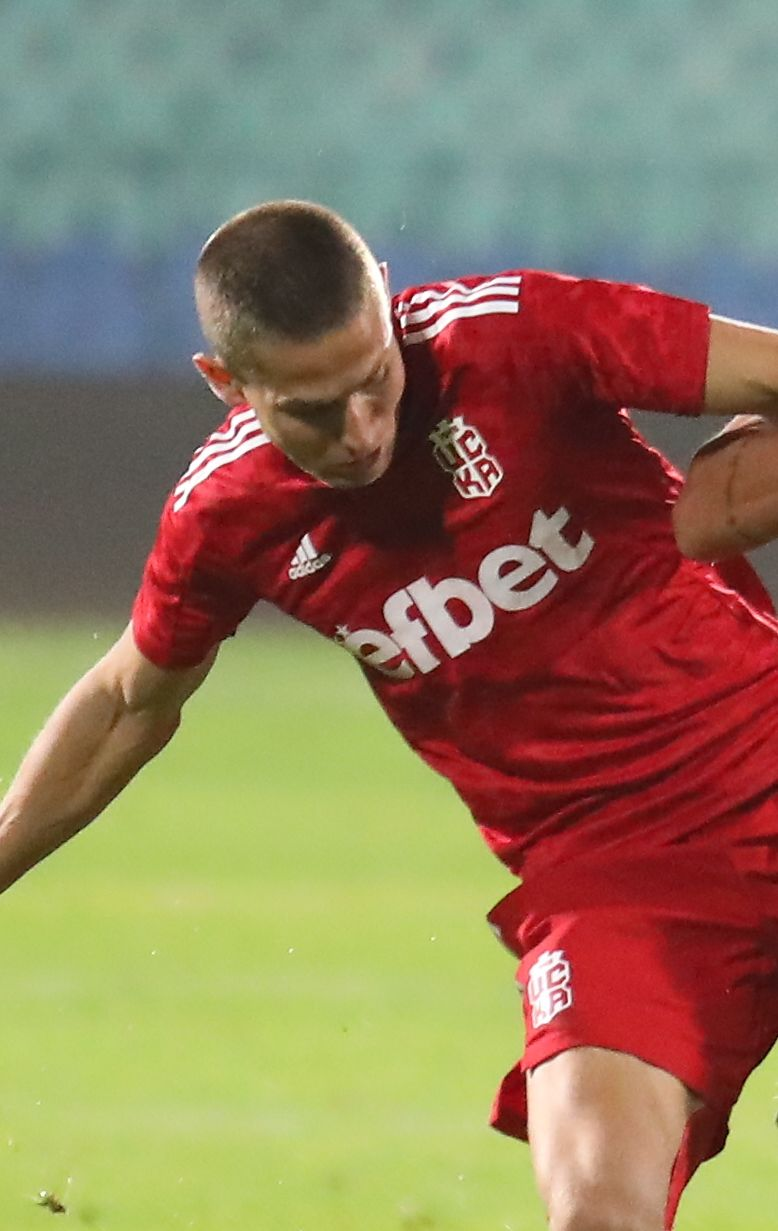

Personal information
- Full name: Denislav Martinov Aleksandrov
- Date of birth: 19 July 1997 (age 29)
- Place of birth: Pleven, Bulgaria
- Height: 1.81 m (5 ft 11 1/2 in)
- Position: Winger

Team information
- Current team: Fratria
- Number: 7

Youth career
- Ludogorets Razgrad

Senior career*
Years	Team	Apps	(Gls)
2014–2018	Ludogorets Razgrad	7	(1)
2015–2018	Ludogorets Razgrad II	77	(19)
2019–2023	CSKA 1948	78	(14)
2021–2023	CSKA 1948 II	16	(14)
2023	Lokomotiv Plovdiv	11	(0)
2023–2025	Slavia Sofia	63	(5)
2025–2026	Hebar	22	(2)
2026–	Fratria	7	(1)

International career^{‡}
2014–2016	Bulgaria U19	6	(1)
2017–2018	Bulgaria U21	2	(0)
2020	Bulgaria	1	(0)
- * Club domestic league appearances and goals as of 07:31, 20 November 2026 (UTC) ‡ National team caps and goals as of 18 November 2020

Denislav Aleksandrov (Bulgarian: Денислав Александров; born 19 July 1997) is a Bulgarian professional footballer who plays as a winger for Fratria.

== Career ==
=== Ludogorets Razgrad ===
Aleksandrov joined the youth system of Ludogorets Razgrad, (Bulgarian: Λудогорец Разград). In 2014, he played for Ludogorets U19 in the UEFA Youth League, being a titular in all of the 6 matches.

In 2014 Aleksandrov made his debut for the first team in the Bulgarian Cup against Botev Vratsa. He also became champion with Ludogorets in the U21 league in this season, and scored 5 goals in the league for the team.

From the 2015/16 season Ludogorets got the chance to have a second team in the B Group and Denislav was promoted to the newly created Ludogorets Razgrad II. He made his debut for the team on 26 July 2015 in a match against Dunav Ruse.

On 23 September 2015 he played again for the Ludogorets first team in a match against Lokomotiv 1929 Mezdra for the Bulgarian Cup. The match was won by Ludogorets by 5:0. On 22 May 2015 he made his complete debut in the A Group for Ludogorets in a match against Beroe Stara Zagora.

Aleksandrov started the 2017–18 season in Ludogorets II playing in the first match of the season against Lokomotiv 1929 Sofia.

On 15 May 2018 he scored his debut goal for Ludogorets first team in a league match against Beroe Stara Zagora.

=== CSKA 1948 ===
On 8 January 2019 Aleksandrov joined CSKA 1948.

== International career ==
Aleksandrov received his first call up for the Bulgaria on 12 November for the UEFA Nations League matches against Finland on 15 November 2020 and Republic of Ireland on 18 November.

== Statistics ==
=== Club ===
As of 3 December 2019

Club performance			League		Cup		Continental		Other		Total	
Club	League	Season	Apps	Goals	Apps	Goals	Apps	Goals	Apps	Goals	Apps	Goals
Bulgaria			League		Bulgarian Cup		Europe		Other (Note: Includes Bulgarian Supercup matches.)		Total	
Ludogorets Razgrad	A Group	2014–15	0	0	1	0	0	0	0	0	1	0
Ludogorets Razgrad	A Group	2015–16	2	0	1	0	0	0	0	0	3	0
Ludogorets Razgrad	First League	2016–17	3	0	1	0	0	0	—		4	0
Ludogorets Razgrad	First League	2017–18	2	1	0	0	0	0	—		2	1
Ludogorets Razgrad	Total		7	1	3	0	0	0	0	0	10	1
Ludogorets Razgrad II	B Group	2015–16	19	1	–		–		–		19	1
Ludogorets Razgrad II	Second League	2016–17	17	4	–		–		–		17	4
Ludogorets Razgrad II	Second League	2017–18	26	8	–		–		–		26	8
Ludogorets Razgrad II	Second League	2018–19	15	6	–		–		–		15	6
Ludogorets Razgrad II	Total		77	19	0	0	0	0	0	0	77	19
CSKA 1948	Second League	2019–20	16	4	2	3	–		–		18	7
Career Total			100	24	5	3	0	0	0	0	105	27
