= Vasil Shopov =

Bulgarian footballer

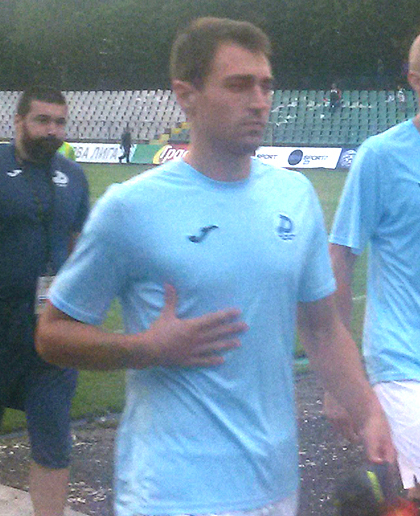

Personal information
- Full name: Vasil Detelinov Shopov
- Date of birth: 9 November 1991 (age 35)
- Place of birth: Pleven, Bulgaria
- Height: 1.85 m (6 ft 1 in)
- Position: Attacking midfielder

Team information
- Current team: Spartak Pleven
- Number: 10

Youth career
- 2000–2010: Spartak Pleven

Senior career*
Years	Team	Apps	(Gls)
2010–2013	Spartak Pleven	61	(14)
2013	Bregalnica Štip	17	(1)
2014–2015	Spartak Pleven	49	(22)
2016–2018	Dunav Ruse	71	(14)
2018–2019	Botev Plovdiv	34	(3)
2019–2021	CSKA 1948	42	(10)
2021	Tsarsko Selo	18	(3)
2022	CSKA 1948	7	(0)
2022–	Spartak Pleven	109	(23)
- * Club domestic league appearances and goals as of 11 June 2026

Vasil Shopov (Bulgarian: Васил Шопов; born 9 November 1991) is a Bulgarian footballer who currently plays as a midfielder for Spartak Pleven.
