= FC Kariana Erden =

Bulgarian football club

Kariana Erden
- Full name: Football Club Kariana Erden
- Founded: 2012; 13 years ago
- Ground: Sport Complex Kariana, Erden
- Capacity: 2,000
- Chairman: Kameliya Yosifova
- League: A Regional League
- 2020–21: Second League, 16th (relegated)
Home colours	Away colours

FC Kariana Erden (Bulgarian: ФК Кариана Ерден) is a Bulgarian football club based in Erden, that plays in A Regional League, the 4th level of Bulgarian football.

== History ==
=== 2014–2020: Milan Yosifov Era ===
They become champions in 2015, winning the Bulgarian A Regional Group and promoting to V Group. For the 2015–16 season, the team got a new sport complex. They finished 5th in their first season in V Group, later known as Third League from 2016.

On 2 May 2017, after the lose against Litex Lovech, manager Georgi Vladimirov and one of the top players Petar Dimitrov were released from the team. A day later, Atanas Dzhambazki was announced as the new manager of the team. On 8 May 2018, the team won their promotion to the Second League.

In their debut season in the second league, Kariana finished 12th, thus ensuring another season in the second tier of Bulgarian football.

During the mid-season break of the 2020-21 season, the owners of Kariana announced that the club would be folding and will not take part after the season resumes in February. This controversial decision was made despite Kariana being at the top of the group at the time. On 11 January 2021 the owner of the club, Milan Yosifov, died after short illness, which was also one of the reasons for the team dissolving.

=== 2021–present: Kameliya Yosifova took over and refoundation ===
On 27 April 2021, just few months after the club's dissolving, Milan's daughter, Kameliya Yosifova, announced that she would take over the club and refound it, joining the Bulgarian A Regional Group from 2021 to 2022 season.

== Honours ==
- Second League:
  - 8th place: 2019–20
- Third League:
  - Winners (1): 2017–18
  - Runners-up (1): 2016–17
- A RFG Montana:
  - Winners (1): 2014–15

== Shirt and sponsor ==
Kariana's main colors are black and red and since 2014 their kit supplier are Zeus.

Period	Kit manufacturer	Shirt partner
2014–2018	(Bulgaria) Zeus	None
2018–2020	(Spain) Joma	None

== Managers ==
Dates	Name	Honours
2014–2015	(Bulgaria) Aleksandar Aleksandrov	1 A RFG Title
2015–2017	(Bulgaria) Georgi Vladimirov	
2017–2018	(Bulgaria) Atanas Dzhambazki	1 Third League Title
2018–2020	(Bulgaria) Veselin Velikov	

== Past seasons ==
Season	League	Place	W	D	L	GF	GA	Pts	Bulgarian Cup
2014–15	A RFG (IV)	1	21	3	2	65	15	66	not qualified
2015–16	V AFG (III)	5	14	5	11	49	44	46	not qualified
2016–17	Third League (III)	2	21	4	3	90	18	67	not qualified
2017–18	Third League	1	25	5	0	100	19	80	not qualified
2018–19	Second League (II)	12	8	7	15	29	38	31	First Round
2019–20	Second League	8	9	5	6	30	24	32	Round of 16
Green marks a season followed by promotion, red a season followed by relegation.
