= FC CSKA 1948 Sofia =

Bulgarian football club

CSKA 1948
- Full name: Football Club Central Sports Club of the Army 1948 Sofia
- Nickname: Червените (The Reds) Делта Форс (Delta Force)
- Founded: 19 July 2016; 10 years ago
- Ground: Stadion Bistritsa
- Capacity: 4,000
- Owner: Tsvetomir Naydenov
- Coach: Ognyan Mladenov
- League: First League
- 2025–26: First League, 2nd of 16
- Website: cska1948.bg
Home colours	Away colours	Third colours

FC CSKA 1948 Sofia (Bulgarian: ФК ЦСКА 1948 София) is a Bulgarian football club from Sofia. The team plays its home matches at the Bistritsa Stadium and competes in Bulgaria's First League. The colours of the club are red and white.

== History ==
=== Foundation ===
The club was founded on 19 July 2016, at a meeting at the Central Military Club in Sofia. The members of the Constituent Assembly announced partnership with Erreà.

=== 2016–2018: Amateur Leagues ===
On 21 August 2016, FC CSKA 1948 won its first cup in a friendly four-team tournament in Kokalyane. The team defeated Akademik Sofia 1–0 in the final.

In its first official game for the 2016–17 season in A OFG Sofia (capital) South, FC CSKA 1948 won 8–0 against Lyulin Sofia. The club began playing its home games at Vasil Levski National Stadium, but later during the season used the stadiums in Obelya and German. FC CSKA 1948 won its group and became champion of the whole A OFG Sofia (capital) after victory 4–3 against Nadezhda Dobroslavtsi. Then, on 7 June 2017, the team played with Bratsigovo in order to qualify for the Third League and won after penalties (7–6). Beside that, FC CSKA 1948 reached the final for the Cup of Bulgarian Amateur League, which they lost on 25 May 2017 to the club from the Third league Chernomorets Balchik.

For their first season in the third division of the Bulgarian football (2017–18), the club moved to Dragalevtsi Stadium, in order to comply with the requirements of the respective league. After very strong performance, on 19 May 2018, FC CSKA 1948 secured its place in Second Professional League. The team finished with 29 wins, 5 draws and no losses, as two players of the Reds became goalscorers of the South-West Third League – Andon Gushterov and Petko Petkov. Also, FC CSKA 1948 had again a good campaign for the Cup of Bulgarian Amateur League, this time reaching the semi-finals.

=== 2018–2020: Second Professional League ===
For the beginning of the 2018–19 season in the Second Professional League, FC CSKA 1948 moved to Vasil Levski National Stadium due to the higher league it is playing in. Strong selection of professional players was done, as the goal for the season is qualification for First League. After four rounds, manager Valentin Iliev, who managed the club from the very beginning, was replaced with Petko Petkov. FC CSKA 1948 eventually finished fourth, three points below the promotion playoff place, which was occupied by Arda Kardzhali. Although FC CSKA 1948 didn't promote to the elite in their first attempt, the team established itself as a strong contender for promotion.

For the 2019–20 season, FC CSKA 1948 started the season on a high note, defeating local rivals Lokomotiv Sofia 2–0 at home. This was followed by an away win at newly promoted Spartak Pleven with a score of 1–4. Another dominant 2–0 win against Spartak Varna earned the team three out of three wins in their first three matches. An away win against Montana, followed by a home destruction of OFC Pomorie extended their winning steak to 5 games. FC CSKA 1948's spectacular form continued, as the team defeated Lokomotiv Gorna Oryahovitsa and Strumska Slava in the following rounds. The team then beat fellow Sofia rivals Septemvri Sofia 5–0 at home. The first defeat of the season came in the tenth round, when FC CSKA 1948 lost 1–0 to Litex Lovech. After a 2–0 home win against Chernomorets Balchik, FC CSKA 1948 suffered another loss in the hands of Kariana Erden. This was followed by three consecutive wins, which ended with a disappointing 2–2 home draw against Ludogorets II. Following that, the team managed to win two away games, against Botev Galabovo and Lokomotiv Sofia again, which put them in second place in the table, three points behind Septemvri Sofia, before the winter break.

=== 2020–present: First Professional League ===
FC CSKA 1948 secured their First League spot for the 2020–21 season after finishing 1st in the 2019–20 Second League. Krasimir Balakov was announced as manager for the new season on 2 June, and the club unveiled a new logo on 30 June in preparation for their First League debut. On 7 August 2020, the team faced CSKA in its first ever top flight game, with the encounter resulting in a 2–2 draw.

CSKA 1948 established itself in the following years in the First League, frequently finishing in the top six of the championship. During the 2022–23 season, the team reached the final of the Bulgarian Cup for the first time in club history, eliminating Lokomotiv Sofia in the semi-finals.

== Club culture ==
Until 2022, the club had a policy of relying exclusively on Bulgarian players, which gained the approval of a lot of the club's supporters who had previously criticized CSKA Sofia for fielding teams with many foreign footballers.

== Shirt, sponsor and mascot ==
The colours of the team main kit are red and white. The second kit is in white and the third – in black, with white sleeves.

On 31 January 2017 CSKA 1948 presented its main sponsor – Efbet. The company sponsors not only the first team, but the academy too.

Period	Kit manufacturer	Shirt partner
2016	(Italy) Erreà	None
2017–2020	(Italy) Erreà	Efbet
2020–2023	(Germany) Adidas	Efbet
2023–2025	(Germany) Puma	Efbet
2025–	(Germany) Jako	Efbet

Since 2018, the team mascot is Army the lion.

== Honours ==
- First League:
  - Runners-up (1): 2025–26
  - Third place (1): 2022–23
- Bulgarian Cup:
  - Runners-up (1): 2022–23
- Bulgarian Supercup:
  - Runners-up (1): 2023
- Second League:
  - Winners (1): 2019–20
- Third League:
  - Winners (1): 2017–18
- A OFG Sofia:
  - Winners (1): 2016–17

== Players ==
=== Current squad ===
As of 1 September 2026

Note: Flags indicate national team as defined under FIFA eligibility rules; some limited exceptions apply. Players may hold more than one non-FIFA nationality.

No.	Pos.	Nation	Player
1	GK	BUL	Petar Marinov
2	DF	BOL	Diego Medina
3	DF	GEO	Lasha Dvali (captain)
4	DF	GER	André Hoffmann
5	DF	MAR	Benaissa Benamar
6	DF	BRA	Emerson Barbosa
7	MF	POR	Bernardo Couto
8	MF	TUN	Moataz Zemzemi
9	FW	BUL	Atanas Iliev
10	MF	BUL	Borislav Tsonev
11	MF	BUL	Georgi Rusev (on loan from Sion)
13	GK	BUL	Dimitar Sheytanov
14	FW	BUL	Kaloyan Strinski
15	DF	TUN	Fourat Soltani

No.	Pos.	Nation	Player
17	MF	BOL	José Martines
20	MF	ARG	Brian Sobrero
22	DF	MNE	Ognjen Gašević
23	MF	GER	Florian Krebs
30	MF	FRA	Jules Meyer
31	GK	BUL	Aleks Bozhev
33	MF	BOL	Héctor Cuéllar
34	MF	BUL	Petar Vitanov
67	MF	POR	Frédéric Maciel
70	DF	BUL	Kostadin Iliev
71	MF	UKR	Danilo Tarasenko
77	MF	BRA	Elias Franco
93	FW	MTN	Mamadou Diallo
96	DF	MNE	Dragan Grivić

For recent transfers, see List of Bulgarian football transfers summer 2026.

=== Out on loan ===
Note: Flags indicate national team as defined under FIFA eligibility rules; some limited exceptions apply. Players may hold more than one non-FIFA nationality.

No.	Pos.	Nation	Player
—	DF	CIV	Adama Traoré (at Arda until 30 June 2027)
—	DF	UKR	Igor Romanyuk (at Lokomotiv GO until 30 June 2027)

No.	Pos.	Nation	Player
—	DF	GHA	Christopher Acheampong (at Lokomotiv GO until 30 June 2027)
—	MF	BUL	Marto Boychev (at Rilski Sportist until 31 December 2026)

=== Foreign players ===
Up to twenty foreign nationals can be registered and given a squad number for the first team in the Bulgarian First League, however only five non-EU nationals can be used during a match day. Those non-EU nationals with European ancestry can claim citizenship from the nation their ancestors came from. If a player does not have European ancestry he can claim Bulgarian citizenship after playing in Bulgaria for 5 years.

EU Nationals

- (France) Jules Meyer
- (Germany) André Hoffmann
- (Germany) Florian Krebs
- (Portugal) Bernardo Couto
- (Portugal) (France) Frédéric Maciel

EU Nationals (Dual citizenship)

- (Morocco) (Netherlands) Benaissa Benamar
- (Mauritania) (France) Mamadou Diallo

Non-EU Nationals

- (Argentina) Brian Sobrero
- (Belarus) Yegor Parkhomenko
- (Bolivia) Héctor Cuéllar
- (Bolivia) José Martínez
- (Bolivia) (Colombia) Diego Medina
- (Brazil) Elias Franco
- (Georgia (country)) Lasha Dvali
- (Montenegro) Dragan Grivić
- (Montenegro) Ognjen Gašević
- (Tunisia) Fourat Soltani
- (Tunisia) Moataz Zemzemi

== Goalscoring and appearance records ==
As of 22 January 2026

**Most appearances for the club in all competitions**

Rank	Name	Career	Appearances
1	(Bulgaria) **Georgi Rusev**	2020–2023; 2025–present	139
2	(Bulgaria) Daniel Naumov	2019–2024	137
3	(Bulgaria) Ivaylo Chochev	2020–2024	104
4	(Bulgaria) Mario Topuzov	2020–2025	95
5	(Bulgaria) Radoslav Kirilov	2022–2025	94
6	(Bulgaria) Andon Gushterov	2017–2020	93
7	(Bulgaria) Emil Tsenov	2023–2025	90
8	(Bulgaria) Reyan Daskalov	2022–2025	87
9	(Bulgaria) Denislav Aleksandrov	2019–2023	85
10	(Bulgaria) Angel Bastunov	2020–2023	83

**Most goals for the club in all competitions**

Rank	Name	Career	Goals
1	(Bulgaria) Andon Gushterov	2017–2020	72
2	(Bulgaria) Ivaylo Chochev	2020–2024	48
3	(Bulgaria) **Georgi Rusev**	2020–2023; 2025–present	25
4	(Bulgaria) Denislav Aleksandrov	2019–2023	19
5	(Bulgaria) Galin Ivanov	2020–2022	18
6	(Brazil) Pedrinho	2023–2024	17
7	(Ukraine) Yevheniy Serdyuk	2022–2025	15
8	(Mauritania) **Mamadou Diallo**	2025–present	13
—	(Bulgaria) Vasil Shopov	2019–2021 2022	13
—	(Bulgaria) Emil Gargorov	2017–2018	13
—	(Bulgaria) Radoslav Kirilov	2022–2025	13

- Includes appearances in First League, Second League, Third League, Bulgarian Cup, Bulgarian Supercup, UEFA Champions League and UEFA Europa League.
- Players in **bold** are still playing for FC CSKA 1948.

As of 22 January 2026

**Most appearances for the club in First League**

Rank	Name	Career	Appearances
1	(Bulgaria) **Georgi Rusev**	2020–2023; 2025–present	127
2	(Bulgaria) Daniel Naumov	2019–2024	106
3	(Bulgaria) Ivaylo Chochev	2020–2024	94
4	(Bulgaria) Mario Topuzov	2020–2025	90
5	(Bulgaria) Radoslav Kirilov	2022–2025	84
6	(Bulgaria) Reyan Daskalov	2022–2025	81
7	(Bulgaria) Birsent Karagaren	2023–2025	79
8	(Bulgaria) Angel Bastunov	2020–2023	76
9	(Bulgaria) Emil Tsenov	2023–2025	75
10	(Bulgaria) Simeon Petrov	2020–2024	71
—	(Cape Verde) Steve Furtado	2022–2025	71

**Most goals for the club in First League**

Rank	Name	Career	Goals
1	(Bulgaria) Ivaylo Chochev	2020–2024	43
2	(Bulgaria) **Georgi Rusev**	2020–2023; 2025–present	23
3	(Bulgaria) Galin Ivanov	2020–2022	18
4	(Ukraine) Yevheniy Serdyuk	2022–2025	12
—	(Brazil) Pedrinho	2023–2024	12
6	(Mauritania) **Mamadou Diallo**	2025–present	11
7	(Bulgaria) Aleksandar Kolev	2022–2023	10
8	(Bulgaria) Martin Kamburov	2018–2021	9
—	(Brazil) **Thalis**	2023–present	9
–	(Bulgaria) Birsent Karagaren	2023–2025	9
—	(Bulgaria) Radoslav Kirilov	2022–2025	9

- Players in **bold** are still playing for FC CSKA 1948.

== Notable players ==
Had international caps for their respective countries, or held any club record. Players whose name is listed in bold represented their countries.

Bulgaria

- (Bulgaria) **Denislav Aleksandrov**
- (Bulgaria) **Ivaylo Chochev**
- (Bulgaria) **Emil Gargorov**
- (Bulgaria) Andon Gushterov
- (Bulgaria) **Atanas Iliev**
- (Bulgaria) **Nikola Iliev**
- (Bulgaria) **Galin Ivanov**
- (Bulgaria) **Martin Kamburov**
- (Bulgaria) **Ivan Karadzhov**
- (Bulgaria) **Birsent Karagaren**
- (Bulgaria) **Radoslav Kirilov**
- (Bulgaria) **Aleksandar Kolev**
- (Bulgaria) **Angel Lyaskov**
- (Bulgaria) **Daniel Mladenov**
- (Bulgaria) **Daniel Naumov**
- (Bulgaria) **Mariyan Ognyanov**
- (Bulgaria) **Miki Orachev**
- (Bulgaria) **Dimitar Pirgov**
- (Bulgaria) **Apostol Popov**
- (Bulgaria) **Georgi Rusev**
- (Bulgaria) **Ventsislav Vasilev**
- (Bulgaria) **Dimitar Sheytanov**
- (Bulgaria) **Antonio Vutov**
- (Bulgaria) **Serkan Yusein**

Europe

- (Albania) **Erdenis Gurishta**
- (Belarus) **Yegor Parkhomenko**
- (Georgia (country)) **Lasha Dvali**
- (Iceland) **Viðar Örn Kjartansson**
- (North Macedonia) **Mario Ilievski**

Asia

- (Tajikistan) **Parvizdzhon Umarbayev**

Africa

- (Cape Verde) **Steve Furtado**
- (Republic of the Congo) **Ryan Bidounga**
- (Mauritania) **Mamadou Diallo**

North America

- (Bolivia) **José Martínez**
- (Bolivia) **Diego Medina**
- (Martinique) **Tom Rapnouil**

== Club officials ==
=== Coaching staff and personnel ===
(Bulgaria) Ivo Stanislavov	Operations director
(Bulgaria) Kiril Emilov	Sports Director
(Bulgaria) Aleksandar Aleksandrov	Head coach
(Bulgaria) Petko Vasilev	Assistant coach
(Bulgaria) Plamen Zdravkov	Assistant coach
(Bulgaria) Deyan Kostadinov	Goalkeeping coach
(Bulgaria) Aleksandar Kostadinov	Analyzer
(Bulgaria) Spas Nikolayev	Scout
(Bulgaria) Ivan Atanasov	Scout
(Bulgaria) Ivan Georgiev	Fitness coach
(Bulgaria) Panayot Milenkov	Fitness coach
(Bulgaria) Hristo Deyanov	Physiotherapist
(Bulgaria) Nikolay Predragov	Physiotherapist
(Bulgaria) Ilian Radomirov	Masseur
(Bulgaria) Ivaylo Iliev	Psychologist
(Bulgaria) Tsvetan Yordanov	Administrator
(Bulgaria) Dushko Stefanov	Administrator
(Bulgaria) Lyubomir Lyupchov	U19 coach
(Bulgaria) Ivan Svetoslavov	U17 coach
(Bulgaria) Emil Petkov	U15 coach
(Bulgaria) Rumen Kirilov	U11 coach

=== Manager history ===
Name	Nat	From	To	Honours
Adalbert Zafirov	(Bulgaria)	1 July 2016	1 September 2016	
Valentin Iliev	(Bulgaria)	2 September 2016	21 June 2018	1 Fourth League title 1 Third League title
Petko Petkov	(Bulgaria)	1 July 2018	21 October 2019	
Yordan Yurukov	(Bulgaria)	21 October 2019	6 June 2020	1 Second League title
Krasimir Balakov	(Bulgaria)	6 June 2020	23 March 2021	
Rosen Kirilov (interim)	(Bulgaria)	23 March 2021	24 April 2021	
Todor Kiselichkov	(Bulgaria)	25 April 2021	26 July 2021	
Miroslav Mindev	(Bulgaria)	27 July 2021	30 August 2021	
Nikolay Kirov	(Bulgaria)	3 September 2021	20 May 2022	
Lyuboslav Penev	(Bulgaria)	28 May 2022	9 December 2022	
Todor Yanchev	(Bulgaria)	13 December 2022	25 May 2023	
Atanas Ribarski	(Bulgaria)	25 May 2023	15 August 2023	
Nikolay Panayotov	(Bulgaria)	15 August 2023	5 April 2024	
Valentin Iliev	(Bulgaria)	5 April 2024	30 October 2024	
Ivan Ivanov	(Bulgaria)	30 October 2024	19 February 2025	
Borislav Kyosev	(Bulgaria)	19 February 2025	4 April 2025	
Aleksandar Aleksandrov	(Bulgaria)	4 April 2025	29 April 2025	
Ivan Stoyanov	(Bulgaria)	29 April 2025	12 February 2026	
Aleksandar Aleksandrov	(Bulgaria)	12 February 2026		

== European record ==
As of match played 11 August 2026

Competition	Played	Won	Drew	Lost	GF	GA	GD	Win%
UEFA Europa Conference League	10	2	4	4	8	13	−5	20.00
Total	10	2	4	4	8	13	−5	20.00

=== Matches ===
Season	Competition	Round	Club	Home	Away	Aggregate
2023–24	UEFA Conference League	2Q	(Romania) FCSB	0–1	2–3	2–4
2024–25	UEFA Conference League	2Q	(Montenegro) Budućnost Podgorica	1–0	1–1 (a.e.t.)	2–1
2024–25	UEFA Conference League	3Q	(Cyprus) Pafos	2–1	0–4 (a.e.t.)	2–5
2026–27	UEFA Conference League	2Q	(Slovakia) Spartak Trnava	0–0 (a.e.t.)	0–0	0–0 (5–3 p)
2026–27	UEFA Conference League	3Q	(Greece) Panathinaikos	1–2 (a.e.t.)	1–1	2–3

== Seasons ==
Results of league and cup competitions by season
Season	League											Bulgarian Cup	Other competitions		Top goalscorer	
Season	Division	Level	P	W	D	L	F	A	GD	Pts	Pos	Bulgarian Cup	Other competitions		Top goalscorer	
2016–17	A OFG Sofia (capital) South	4	22	21	1	0	105	7	98	64	1st ‡	DNE	Cup of AFL	F		
2017–18	South-West Third League	3	34	29	5	0	95	16	79	92	1st ↑	DNQ	Cup of AFL	SF	(Bulgaria) Andon Gushterov	22
2018–19	Second League	2	30	16	11	3	39	18	21	59	4th	Round of 32	DNE		(Bulgaria) Andon Gushterov	21
2019–20	Second League	2	21	18	1	2	59	18	41	55	1st ↑	Quarter-final	DNE		(Bulgaria) Andon Gushterov	28
2020–21	First League	1	31	12	11	8	41	34	7	47	5th	Quarter-final	DNE		(Bulgaria) Martin Kamburov	9
2021–22	First League	1	32	11	8	13	51	45	6	41	8th	Round of 32	DNE		(Bulgaria) Ivaylo Chochev	8
2022–23	First League	1	35	17	13	5	49	22	27	64	3rd	Runners-up	DNE		(Bulgaria) Ivaylo Chochev	22
2023–24	First League	1	36	13	13	10	35	30	5	52	7th	Quarter-final	Europa Conference League	2Q	(Brazil) Pedrinho	8
2024–25	First League	1	37	12	11	14	45	47	−2	47	11th	Round of 16	Europa Conference League	3Q	(Ukraine) Yevheniy Serdyuk	9
2025–26	First League	1										Quarter-final	DNE		(Mauritania) Mamadou Diallo	11

== See also ==
- List of fan-owned sports teams
- AFC Wimbledon
- SV Austria Salzburg
- CSA Steaua București
- C.F. Os Belenenses
- F.C. United of Manchester
