= 2019–20 PFC Ludogorets Razgrad season =

Ludogorets Razgrad
2019–20 season
- Chairman: Aleksandar Aleksandrov
- Manager: Stoycho Stoev (until 25 August); Stanislav Genchev (26 August – 31 December); Pavel Vrba (from 1 January)
- A-Group: 1st
- Bulgarian Cup: Quarter-final (vs. Levski Sofia)
- Supercup: Winners
- Champions League: First qualifying round (vs. Ferencváros)
- Europa League: Round of 32 (vs. Inter Milan)
- Top goalscorer: League: Claudiu Keșerü (12); All: Claudiu Keșerü (18)
Home colours	Away colours	Third colours

The 2019–20 season was Ludogorets Razgrad's ninth consecutive season in the Bulgarian First League, of which they were defending champions. Ludogorets Razgrad finished the season as Champions for the ninth season in a row, whilst they reached the Quarterfinals of the Bulgarian Cup, before defeat to Levski Sofia, and won the Supercup. In Europe, they were knocked out of the Champions League by Ferencváros in the First qualifying round, dropping into the Europa League where they reached the Round of 32 before being knocked out by Inter Milan.

== Season events ==
On 25 August, Stoycho Stoev left his role as manager of Ludogorets Razgrad, with assistant manager Stanislav Genchev and Zdravko Zdravkov being put in temporary charge. On 16 December, Zdravko Zdravkov left the club to take up a role in China, whilst Pavel Vrba was confirmed as Ludogorets Razgrad's new manager starting on 1 January 2020.

On 28 February, Ludogorets' match against Arda Kardzhali scheduled for 1 March was moved to 18 March due to the precautionary measures around Ludogorets travel to Milan for their UEFA Europa League Round of 32 match against Inter Milan and the outbreak of COVID-19 in Italy.

On 13 March, the Bulgarian Football Union decided to suspend all fixtures until 13 April in accordance with the measures taken to combat the COVID-19 pandemic. On 3 April, the state of national emergency was extended until 13 May and on 11 April the Minister of Youth and Sports Krasen Kralev confirmed that no mass participation sports events and full training sessions will be held until that date.

On 30 June, Wanderson signed a new contract with the club.

== Squad ==
As of match played 12 July 2020

No.	Name	Nationality	Position	Date of birth (age)	Signed from	Signed in	Contract ends	Apps.	Goals
Goalkeepers
23	Plamen Iliev	(Bulgaria)	GK	30 November 1991 (aged 28)	Astra Giurgiu	2019		42	0
27	Vladislav Stoyanov	(Bulgaria)	GK	8 June 1987 (aged 33)	Sheriff Tiraspol	2013		132	0
33	Renan	(Brazil)	GK	18 May 1989 (aged 31)	Avaí	2017		78	0
69	Damyan Damyanov	(Bulgaria)	GK	29 July 2000 (aged 19)	Youth Team	2016		1	0
Defenders
3	Anton Nedyalkov	(Bulgaria)	DF	30 April 1993 (aged 27)	FC Dallas	2018		89	1
4	Cicinho	(Brazil)	DF	26 December 1988 (aged 31)	Santos	2015		150	1
5	Georgi Terziev	(Bulgaria)	DF	18 April 1992 (aged 28)	Chernomorets Burgas	2013		150	5
6	Taleb Tawatha	(Israel)	DF	21 June 1992 (aged 28)	Eintracht Frankfurt	2019		7	0
11	Stanislav Manolev	(Bulgaria)	DF	16 December 1985 (aged 34)	CSKA Sofia	2019		21	1
21	Dragoș Grigore	(Romania)	DF	7 September 1986 (aged 33)	Al-Sailiya	2018		41	4
22	Jordan Ikoko	(Democratic Republic of the Congo)	DF	3 February 1994 (aged 26)	Guingamp	2019		27	2
30	Cosmin Moți	(Romania)	DF	3 December 1984 (aged 35)	Dinamo București	2012		281	35
58	Dimitar Iliev	(Bulgaria)	DF	22 June 1999 (aged 21)	Youth Team	2017		1	0
75	Martin Milkov	(Bulgaria)	DF	25 December 1999 (aged 20)	Youth Team	2017		1	0
90	Rafael Forster	(Brazil)	DF	23 July 1990 (aged 29)	Zorya Luhansk	2017		51	2
Midfielders
7	Dimo Bakalov	(Bulgaria)	MF	19 December 1988 (aged 31)	Lokomotiv Plovdiv	2018		40	3
8	Dan Biton	(Israel)	MF	20 July 1995 (aged 24)	Ashdod	2019		34	6
12	Anicet Abel	(Madagascar)	MF	13 March 1990 (aged 30)	Botev Plovdiv	2014		187	14
17	Jorginho	(Guinea-Bissau)	MF	21 September 1995 (aged 24)	Saint-Étienne	2019		30	7
18	Svetoslav Dyakov	(Bulgaria)	MF	31 May 1984 (aged 36)	Lokomotiv Sofia	2012		330	11
20	Serkan Yusein	(Bulgaria)	MF	31 March 1996 (aged 24)	Botev Plovdiv	2019		12	0
25	Stéphane Badji	(Senegal)	MF	29 May 1990 (aged 30)	Bursaspor	2019		37	0
31	Georgi Valchev	(Bulgaria)	MF	5 February 2000 (aged 20)	Youth Team	2018		0	0
50	Tsvetoslav Petrov	(Bulgaria)	MF	30 May 1999 (aged 21)	Youth Team	2019		1	0
64	Dominik Yankov	(Bulgaria)	MF	13 July 2000 (aged 19)	Sunderland	2017		9	0
72	Erol Dost	(Bulgaria)	MF	30 May 1999 (aged 21)	Youth Team	2017		3	1
76	Serdar Yusufov	(Bulgaria)	MF	2 October 1998 (aged 21)	Youth Team	2018		0	0
82	Ivan Yordanov	(Bulgaria)	MF	7 November 2000 (aged 19)	Youth Team	2019		3	0
84	Marcelinho	(Bulgaria)	MF	24 August 1984 (aged 35)	Bragantino	2011		347	97
88	Wanderson	(Bulgaria)	MF	2 January 1988 (aged 32)	Portuguesa	2014		241	66
95	Cauly	(Brazil)	MF	15 September 1995 (aged 24)	SC Paderborn	2020		13	4
Forwards
10	Jakub Świerczok	(Poland)	FW	28 December 1992 (aged 27)	Zagłębie Lubin	2017		86	37
13	Mavis Tchibota	(Republic of the Congo)	FW	7 May 1996 (aged 24)	Bnei Yehuda Tel Aviv	2019		41	13
28	Claudiu Keșerü	(Romania)	FW	2 December 1986 (aged 33)	Al-Gharafa	2015		201	119
51	Ilker Budinov	(Bulgaria)	FW	11 August 2000 (aged 19)	Youth Team	2019		2	0
Players away on loan
9	Juninho	(Brazil)	FW	7 January 1995 (aged 25)	Atlético Goianiense	2018		2	0
98	Svetoslav Kovachev	(Bulgaria)	MF	14 March 1998 (aged 22)	Youth Team	2015		13	2
Players who left during the season
1	Jorge Broun	(Argentina)	GK	23 May 1986 (aged 34)	Colón	2017		40	0
11	May Mahlangu	(South Africa)	MF	1 May 1989 (aged 31)	Dinamo București	2018		8	1
37	João Paulo	(Brazil)	FW	2 June 1988 (aged 32)	Botev Plovdiv	2017		50	6
44	Jacek Góralski	(Poland)	MF	21 September 1992 (aged 27)	Jagiellonia Białystok	2017		92	0
63	David Ribeiro	(Brazil)	MF	23 April 1998 (aged 22)	Santo André	2019		1	0
92	Jody Lukoki	(Democratic Republic of the Congo)	MF	15 November 1992 (aged 27)	PEC Zwolle	2015		154	30

=== Out on loan ===
Note: Flags indicate national team as defined under FIFA eligibility rules; some limited exceptions apply. Players may hold more than one non-FIFA nationality.

No. / Pos. / Nation / Player; — / MF / BUL / Svetoslav Kovachev (at Arda Kardzhali until 30 June 2020)	No. / Pos. / Nation / Player; — / FW / BRA / Júnior Brandão (at Atlético Goianiense until 31 December 2020)

== Transfers ==
=== In ===
Date	Position	Nationality	Name	From	Fee	Ref.
11 June 2019	MF	(Israel)	Dan Biton	Ashdod	Undisclosed	
11 June 2019	FW	(Republic of the Congo)	Mavis Tchibota	Bnei Yehuda	Undisclosed	
16 June 2019	DF	(Democratic Republic of the Congo)	Jordan Ikoko	Guingamp	Undisclosed	
18 June 2019	MF	(Guinea-Bissau)	Jorginho	Saint-Étienne	Undisclosed	
28 June 2019	MF	(Senegal)	Stéphane Badji	Bursaspor	Undisclosed	
11 September 2019	DF	(Israel)	Taleb Tawatha	Eintracht Frankfurt	Undisclosed	
13 January 2020	MF	(Brazil)	Cauly	Paderborn	Undisclosed	

=== Out ===
Date	Position	Nationality	Name	To	Fee	Ref.
Summer 2019	GK	(Bulgaria)	Daniel Naumov	CSKA 1948 Sofia	Undisclosed	
Summer 2019	DF	(Bulgaria)	Ventsislav Kerchev	Botev Vratsa	Undisclosed	
Summer 2019	DF	(Bulgaria)	Lachezar Kovachev	Spartak Pleven	Undisclosed	
Summer 2019	DF	(Bulgaria)	Preslav Petrov	Montana	Undisclosed	
Summer 2019	MF	(Bulgaria)	Ivaylo Klimentov	CSKA 1948 Sofia	Undisclosed	
Summer 2019	MF	(Bulgaria)	Oleg Dimitrov	Litex Lovech	Undisclosed	
Winter 2020	MF	(Brazil)	David Ribeiro	Red Bull Brasil	Undisclosed	
19 January 2020	MF	(Poland)	Jacek Góralski	Kairat	Undisclosed	
13 February 2020	MF	(South Africa)	May Mahlangu	Ordabasy	Undisclosed	

=== Loans out ===
Start date	Position	Nationality	Name	To	End date	Ref.
3 January 2019	FW	(Brazil)	Júnior Brandão	Goiás	Summer 2019	
15 February 2019	MF	(South Africa)	May Mahlangu	Ordabasy	1 December 2019	
15 February 2019	FW	(Brazil)	João Paulo	Ordabasy	1 December 2019	
1 August 2019	MF	(Bulgaria)	Dominik Yankov	Botev Vratsa	31 December 2019	
9 August 2019	FW	(Brazil)	David Ribeiro	Botev Vratsa	31 December 2019	
Summer 2019	MF	(Bulgaria)	Svetoslav Kovachev	Etar	31 December 2019	
Summer 2019	MF	(Bulgaria)	Serkan Yusein	Tsarsko Selo	31 December 2019	
Summer 2019	FW	(Brazil)	Júnior Brandão	Persepolis		
6 January 2020	MF	(Bulgaria)	Svetoslav Kovachev	Arda Kardzhali	End of Season	
20 February 2020	FW	(Brazil)	Júnior Brandão	Atlético Goianiense	31 December 2020	

=== Released ===
Date	Position	Nationality	Name	Joined	Date
	DF	(Brazil)	Natanael	Internacional	2 July 2019
	MF	(Brazil)	Lucas Sasha	Aris Thessaloniki	10 July 2019
13 December 2019	GK	(Argentina)	Jorge Broun	Gimnasia	7 January 2020
31 December 2019	FW	(Brazil)	João Paulo	Ordabasy	
1 April 2020	MF	(Democratic Republic of the Congo)	Jody Lukoki	Yeni Malatyaspor	
30 June 2020	DF	(Bulgaria)	Stanislav Manolev	Pirin Blagoevgrad	1 July 2020
8 July 2020	MF	(Bulgaria)	Marcelinho	Vitória	

== Friendlies ==
19 June 2019	Ludogorets Razgrad (Bulgaria)	4–0	(Slovenia) Triglav Kranj	Austria
18:30 EEST (UTC+3)	Bakalov 45', 59'; S.Kovachev 50'; Biton 60'	Report

22 June 2019	Ludogorets Razgrad (Bulgaria)	2–0	(Azerbaijan) Qarabağ	Austria
19:00 EEST (UTC+3)	Marcelinho 17'; Bakalov 71'	Report

26 June 2019	Ludogorets Razgrad (Bulgaria)	0–3	(Ukraine) Shakhtar Donetsk	Austria
18:00 EEST (UTC+3)		Report	Tetê 3'; Patrick 29'; Sikan 71'

27 June 2019	Ludogorets Razgrad (Bulgaria)	2–1	(Romania) Botoșani	Austria
19:00 EEST (UTC+3)	Świerczok 44', 64'	Report	Miron 63'

18 January 2020	Ludogorets Razgrad (Bulgaria)	2–0	(Poland) Wisła Płock	Belek, Turkey
16:00 EET (UTC+2)	Świerczok 8'; Tawatha 27'	Report

22 January 2020	Ludogorets Razgrad (Bulgaria)	0–2	(Poland) Piast Gliwice	Belek, Turkey
16:00 EET (UTC+2)		Report	Korun 11'; Parzyszek 41'

29 January 2020	Ludogorets Razgrad (Bulgaria)	6–0	(Kazakhstan) Kairat	Belek, Turkey
16:00 EET (UTC+2)	Keșerü 2'; Jorginho 38'; Świerczok 66', 76'; Tchibota 68' (pen.); Bakalov 70'	Report

1 February 2020	Ludogorets Razgrad (Bulgaria)	0–1	(Serbia) Red Star Belgrade	Belek, Turkey
16:00 EET (UTC+2)		Report	Gobeljić 28'

6 February 2020	Ludogorets Razgrad (Bulgaria)	0–1	(Russia) Akhmat Grozny	Belek, Turkey
16:00 EET (UTC+2)		Report	Ponce 86'

7 February 2020	Ludogorets Razgrad (Bulgaria)	1–1	(Slovakia) Slovan Bratislava	Belek, Turkey
16:00 EET (UTC+2)	Jorginho 65'	Report	Nono 62'

27 May 2020	Ludogorets Razgrad (Bulgaria)	0–1	(Bulgaria) Cherno More Varna	Razgrad, Bulgaria
		Report	Isa 22'	Stadium: Huvepharma Arena

29 May 2020	Ludogorets Razgrad (Bulgaria)	4–0	(Bulgaria) Dunav Ruse	Razgrad, Bulgaria
	Marcelinho 10'; Wanderson 32', 45'; Cicinho 65'	Report		Stadium: Huvepharma Arena

== Competitions ==
=== Bulgarian Supercup ===
3 July 2019	Ludogorets Razgrad	2–0	Lokomotiv Plovdiv	Sofia
20:30 EEST (UTC+3)	Tchibota 3'; Góralski (yellow card) 7'; Lukoki (yellow card) 68' (goal) 90+3'; Grigore (yellow card) 76'; Cicinho (yellow card) 89'	Report	Eze (yellow card) 11'; Umarbayev (yellow card) 44'; Tomašević (yellow card) 48'; Ožbolt (yellow card) 68'; Bahtić (yellow card) 90'	Stadium: Vasil Levski National Stadium; Attendance: 3,800; Referee: Ivaylo Stoyanov

=== A Football Group ===
==== Regular stage ====
===== Table =====
Pos	Team	Pld	W	D	L	GF	GA	GD	Pts	Qualification
1	Ludogorets Razgrad	26	18	8	0	46	12	+34	62	Qualification for the Championship round
2	Lokomotiv Plovdiv	26	14	8	4	49	23	+26	50 (Note: Head-to-head points (GD): Lokomotiv Plovdiv 4, CSKA Sofia 1.)	Qualification for the Championship round
3	CSKA Sofia	26	14	8	4	41	17	+24	50	Qualification for the Championship round
4	Levski Sofia	26	14	7	5	43	19	+24	49	Qualification for the Championship round
5	Slavia Sofia	26	13	6	7	36	28	+8	45	Qualification for the Championship round

Source: Soccerway
Rules for classification: 1) Points; 2) Head-to-head points; 3) Head-to-head goal difference; 4) Head-to-head goals scored; 5) Head-to-head away goals scored (only if two teams); 6) Goal difference; 7) Goals scored; 8) Fairplay ranking; 9) Draw.

===== Results summary =====
Overall								Home						Away					
Pld	W	D	L	GF	GA	GD	Pts	W	D	L	GF	GA	GD	W	D	L	GF	GA	GD
26	18	8	0	46	12	+34	62	10	3	0	29	5	+24	8	5	0	17	7	+10

Last updated: 14 June 2020.
Source: See Results

===== Results by round =====
Game	1	2	3	4	5	6	7	8	9	10	11	12	13	14	15	16	17	18	19	20	21	22	23	24	25	26
Ground	H	A	H	A	H	A	H	A	H	H	A	H	A	A	H	A	H	A	H	A	H	A	H	A	A	H
Result	W	W	W	D	D	W	D	W	W	W	W	W	W	W	W	W	W	D	D	D	W	D	W	W	D	W
Position	4	2	1	2	1	1	2	1	1	1	1	1	1	1	1	1	1	1	1	1	1	1	1	1	1	1

Source: See Results
A = Away; H = Home; W = Win; D = Draw; L = Loss

===== Results =====
13 July 2019 1	Ludogorets Razgrad	2–0	Tsarsko Selo	Veliko Tarnovo
21:00 EEST (UTC+3)	Keșerü 7' (pen.), 66'; Yusein (yellow card) 20'; Badji (yellow card) 58'; Yankov (yellow card) 68'	Report	Wesley (yellow card) 9'; Katsarov (yellow card) 47'	Stadium: Ivaylo Stadium; Attendance: 260; Referee: Nikolay Yordanov; Man of the Match: Claudiu Keșerü
Note: Match played at the Ivaylo Stadium in Veliko Tarnovo instead of Ludogorets Razgrad regular Ludogorets Arena in Razgrad.

20 July 2019 2	Beroe	2–4	Ludogorets Razgrad	Stara Zagora
21:00 EEST (UTC+3)	Josipovic 45+3' (pen.), 90'; Vasilev (yellow card) 52'	Report	Jorginho 8', 35'; Cicinho (yellow card) 32'; Keșerü 53', 55'	Stadium: Beroe Stadium; Attendance: 2,800; Referee: Dragomir Draganov; Man of the Match: Jorginho

29 July 2019 3	Ludogorets Razgrad	2–0	Vitosha Bistritsa	Razgrad
21:00 EEST (UTC+3)	Świerczok 79'; Yusein (yellow card) 87'; Lukoki 90'	Report	Kouroupis (yellow card) 18'; Hristev (yellow card) 61'; Gyonov (yellow card) 74'	Stadium: Ludogorets Arena; Attendance: 850; Referee: Radoslav Gidzhenov; Man of the Match: Nikolay Georgiev

4 August 2019 4	Lokomotiv Plovdiv	1–1	Ludogorets Razgrad	Plovdiv
21:00 EEST (UTC+3)	Tomašević (yellow card) 36'; Karagaren 60' (yellow card) 61'; Pirgov (yellow card) 90+2'	Report	Wanderson 64'; Cicinho (yellow card) 77'; Abel (yellow card) 86'	Stadium: Lokomotiv Stadium; Attendance: 3,100; Referee: Stanislav Todorov; Man of the Match: Ilko Pirgov

11 August 2019 5	Ludogorets Razgrad	0–0	CSKA Sofia	Razgrad
20:30 EEST (UTC+3)	Keșerü (yellow card) 77'; Wanderson (yellow card) 82'	Report	Rodrigues (yellow card) 45'; Fabbrini (yellow card) 83'	Stadium: Ludogorets Arena; Attendance: 5,000; Referee: Dragomir Draganov; Man of the Match: Plamen Iliev

18 August 2019 6	Cherno More	1–2	Ludogorets Razgrad	Varna
20:30 EEST (UTC+3)	Rodrigo Henrique 28'; Chantakias (yellow card) 57'; Neagu (yellow card) 61'; Panov (yellow card) 65'	Report	Góralski (yellow card) 15'; Biton 32'; Dyakov (yellow card) 48'; Iliev (yellow card) 61'; Keșerü 74'; Marcelinho (yellow card) 80' (yellow-red card) 85'; Tchibota (yellow card) 86'; Świerczok (yellow card) 90+4'	Stadium: Ticha Stadium; Attendance: 3,400; Referee: Ivaylo Stoyanov – the Wedding; Man of the Match: Dan Biton

25 August 2019 7	Ludogorets Razgrad	0–0	Slavia Sofia	Razgrad
20:30 EEST (UTC+3)	Góralski (yellow card) 61'; Wanderson (yellow card) 64'; Grigore (yellow card) 82'; Keșerü (yellow card) 90+1'	Report	Bengyuzov (yellow card) 16'; Stergiakis (red card) 44'; Petkov (yellow card) 86'	Stadium: Ludogorets Arena; Attendance: 1,600; Referee: Stefan Apostolov; Man of the Match: Georgi Petkov

1 September 2019 8	Botev Vratsa	0–1	Ludogorets Razgrad	Vratsa
20:30 EEST (UTC+3)	Gadzhev (yellow card) 35'; Valchev (yellow card) 40'; Mihaylov (yellow card) 54'; Domovchiyski (yellow card) 69'	Report	Manolev 21' (yellow card) 56'; Góralski (yellow card) 26'; Renan (yellow card) 39'; Terziev (yellow card) 62'; Grigore (yellow card) 70'; Dyakov (yellow card) 79'	Stadium: Stadion Hristo Botev; Attendance: 2,900; Referee: Vladimir Valkov; Man of the Match: Stanislav Manolev

14 September 2019 9	Ludogorets Razgrad	2–0	Etar	Razgrad
20:00 EEST (UTC+3)	Keșerü 47'; Cicinho (yellow card) 53'; Lukoki 86'	Report	K. Stoyanov (yellow card) 75'; Pehlivanov (yellow card) 89'	Stadium: Ludogorets Arena; Attendance: 1,100; Referee: Nikola Popov; Man of the Match: Claudiu Keșerü

22 September 2019 10	Ludogorets Razgrad	2–0	Arda	Razgrad
20:15 EEST (UTC+3)	Biton 35'; Moți (yellow card) 42'; Tchibota 66'; Terziev (yellow card) 72'; Manolev (yellow card) 78'	Report	Hassani (yellow card) 57'; Martinov (yellow card) 86'	Stadium: Ludogorets Arena; Attendance: 1,200; Referee: Ivaylo Stoyanov; Man of the Match: Dan Biton

29 September 2019 11	Dunav Ruse	0–1	Ludogorets Razgrad	Ruse
18:15 EEST (UTC+3)	Kolev (yellow card) 17'; Inkoom (yellow card) 89'	Report	Keșerü 23'; Nedyalkov (yellow card) 56'; Manolev (yellow card) 90'; Góralski (yellow card) 90+2'	Stadium: Gradski Stadium; Attendance: 2,000; Referee: Nikolay Yordanov; Man of the Match: Claudiu Keșerü

6 October 2019 12	Ludogorets Razgrad	2–0	Levski Sofia	Razgrad
20:15 EEST (UTC+3)	Tchibota 16'; Ikoko (yellow card) 54'; Góralski (yellow card) 65'; Badji (yellow card) 71'; Iliev (yellow card) 74'; Keșerü 80'; Abel (yellow card) 85'; Biton (yellow card) 90+2'	Report	Thiam (yellow card) 28'; Milanov (yellow card) 46'; Raynov (yellow card) 55'; Reis (yellow card) 83'	Stadium: Ludogorets Arena; Attendance: 6,500; Referee: Georgi Kabakov; Man of the Match: Mavis Tchibota

19 October 2019 13	Botev Plovdiv	0–1	Ludogorets Razgrad	Plovdiv
17:30 EEST (UTC+3)	D. Tonev (yellow card) 36'; A. Tonev (yellow card) 56'; Pervan (yellow card) 76'; Dimitrov (yellow card) 88'	Report	Jorginho 7'; Forster (yellow card) 55'	Stadium: Botev 1912 Football Complex; Attendance: 2,900; Referee: Georgi Dimitrov; Man of the Match: Plamen Iliev

29 October 2019 14	Tsarsko Selo	0–2	Ludogorets Razgrad	Sofia
18:30 EET (UTC+2)	Wesley (yellow card) 11'; Antwi (yellow card) 59'; Anderson (yellow card) 85'	Report	Świerczok 21'; Abel (yellow card) 52'; Ikoko 56'; Terziev (yellow card) 59'; Tchibota (yellow card) 61'; Nedyalkov (yellow card) 78'	Stadium: Tsarsko Selo Sports Complex; Attendance: 280; Referee: Nikolay Yordanov; Man of the Match: Jakub Świerczok

2 November 2019 15	Ludogorets Razgrad	3–1	Beroe	Razgrad
17:30 EET (UTC+2)	Cicinho (yellow card) 3'; Wanderson 21'; Keșerü 52'; Świerczok 80'; Badji (yellow card) 90+3'	Report	Conté 6'; Touba (yellow card) 18'; Kamburov (yellow card) 75'	Stadium: Ludogorets Arena; Attendance: 800; Referee: Radoslav Gidzhenov; Man of the Match: Claudiu Keșerü

10 November 2019 16	Vitosha Bistritsa	0–1	Ludogorets Razgrad	Bistritsa
17:45 EET (UTC+2)	Kupenov (yellow card) 46'; Kotev (yellow card) 56'; Vasilev (yellow card) 86'	Report	Ikoko (yellow card) 38'; Bakalov 90+1'	Stadium: Stadion Bistritsa; Attendance: 250; Referee: Georgi Dimitrov; Man of the Match: Kristiyan Kochilov

23 November 2019 17	Ludogorets Razgrad	2–1	Lokomotiv Plovdiv	Razgrad
EET (UTC+2)	Marcelinho 15' (yellow card) 74'; Lukoki 31'; Moți (yellow card) 60'	Report	Ožbolt 11'; D. Iliev (yellow card) 60'; Aralica (yellow card) 89'	Stadium: Ludogorets Arena; Referee: Dragomir Draganov

1 December 2019 18	CSKA Sofia	0–0	Ludogorets Razgrad	Sofia
18:00 EET (UTC+2)	Albentosa (yellow card) 12'; Rodrigues (yellow card) 36'; Galabov (yellow card) 72'; Geferson (yellow card) 89'	Report	Abel (yellow card) 25'; Forster (yellow card) 33'; Tchibota (yellow card) 38'; Keșerü (yellow card) 49'; Wanderson (yellow card) 90'	Stadium: Balgarska Armia Stadium; Attendance: 9,000; Referee: Nikolay Yordanov

7 December 2019 19	Ludogorets Razgrad	1–1	Cherno More	Razgrad
16:30 EET (UTC+2)	Moți (yellow card) 74'; Świerczok 84'; Cicinho (red card) 90+3'	Report	Boukassi (yellow card) 14'; Aktaou 43'; Chantakias (yellow card) 69'; Popov (yellow card) 75'; Dimov (yellow card) 87'	Stadium: Ludogorets Arena; Attendance: 800; Referee: Georgi Kabakov

15 December 2019 20	Slavia Sofia	1–1	Ludogorets Razgrad	Sofia
16:30 EET (UTC+2)	K. Krastev (yellow card) 24'; Karabelyov (yellow card) 75'; Bengyuzov (yellow card) 88'; Velkovski 90+4'	Report	Tchibota 22' (yellow card) 27'; Dyakov (yellow card) 75'; Manolev (yellow card) 90+1'	Stadium: Stadion Slavia; Attendance: 380; Referee: Ivaylo Stoyanov

15 February 2020 21	Ludogorets Razgrad	6–0	Botev Vratsa	Razgrad
17:30 EET (UTC+2)	Marcelinho 8', 43'; Terziev (yellow card) 27'; Wanderson (yellow card) 54'; Keșerü 56'; Abel 64'; Świerczok 78', 82'; Moți (yellow card) 90'	Report	Lyaskov (yellow card) 36'; Gadzhev (yellow card) 62'; Domovchiyski (yellow card) 90'	Stadium: Ludogorets Arena; Attendance: 650; Referee: Vladimir Valkov

23 February 2020 22	Etar	1–1	Ludogorets Razgrad	Veliko Tarnovo
16:30 EET (UTC+2)	Stanev (yellow card) 10'; Kolev (yellow card) 45'; I. Stoyanov 48'; Gospodinov (yellow card) 88'	Report	Marcelinho (yellow card) 43' (goal) 50'; Badji (yellow card) 70'	Stadium: Stadion Ivaylo; Attendance: 1,300; Referee: Nikola Popov

8 March 2020 24	Ludogorets Razgrad	5–1	Dunav Ruse	Razgrad
17:30 EET (UTC+2)	Tchibota 13'; Keșerü 30', 38'; Marcelinho 32'; Jorginho 80'	Report	Dolapchiev 5'; Mitkov (yellow card) 72'	Stadium: Ludogorets Arena; Attendance: 550; Referee: Georgi Nikolov

5 June 2020 25	Levski Sofia	0–1	Ludogorets Razgrad	Sofia
21:00 EEST (UTC+3)	Slavchev (yellow card) 53'; Paulinho (yellow card) 59'	Report	Grigore (yellow card) 34'; Cauly 46'; Nedyalkov (yellow card) 66'; Stoyanov (yellow card) 70'; Wanderson (yellow card) 78'; Świerczok (yellow card) 82'; Ikoko (yellow card) 90'	Stadium: Vivacom Arena – Georgi Asparuhov; Attendance: 4,500; Referee: Nikolay Yordanov
Note: Match was originally scheduled to be played on 14 March, but was postponed due to the COVID-19 pandemic.

10 June 2020 23	Arda	1–1	Ludogorets Razgrad	Plovdiv
18:45 EEST (UTC+3)	Kostadinov (yellow card) 35'; Kokonov 41' (yellow card) 73'	Report	Jorginho 37'; Moți (yellow card) 57'	Stadium: Stadion Lokomotiv; Attendance: 70; Referee: Georgi Kabakov
Note: Match was originally scheduled for 1 March, then 18 March, before being postponed due to the COVID-19 pandemic.

14 June 2020 26	Ludogorets Razgrad	2–1	Botev Plovdiv	Razgrad
18:45 EEST (UTC+3)	Grigore (yellow card) 48'; Wanderson 57'; Jorginho 90'	Report	Burbano (yellow card) 14'; Vutov (yellow card) 21' (goal) 45+2'	Stadium: Ludogorets Arena; Attendance: 800; Referee: Volen Chinkov
Note: Match was originally planned to be played on 21 March, but was postponed due to the COVID-19 pandemic.

==== Championship stage ====
===== Results summary =====
Overall								Home						Away					
Pld	W	D	L	GF	GA	GD	Pts	W	D	L	GF	GA	GD	W	D	L	GF	GA	GD
5	3	1	1	13	6	+7	10	3	0	0	11	2	+9	0	1	1	2	4	−2

Last updated: 8 July 2020.
Source: See Results

===== Results by round =====
Round	1	2	3	4	5
Ground	H	H	A	H	A
Result	W	W	D	W	L
Position	1	1	1	1	1

Updated to match(es) played on 8 July 2020. Source: See results
A = Away; H = Home; W = Win; D = Draw; L = Loss

===== Results =====
21 June 2020 1	Ludogorets Razgrad	2–1	Beroe	Razgrad
16:30 EEST (UTC+3)	Cauly 60'; Tchibota 62'	Report	Fall 28'; N.Marinov (yellow card) 86'	Stadium: Ludogorets Arena; Referee: Vladimir Valkov

27 June 2020 2	Ludogorets Razgrad	6–1	Lokomotiv Plovdiv	Razgrad
21:00 EEST (UTC+3)	Moți 1'; Wanderson 13', 22'; Cauly 35'; Jorginho 74'; Tchibota 87'	Report	Akinyemi (yellow card) 55'; Muslimović 67'	Stadium: Ludogorets Arena; Referee: Georgi Davidov

3 July 2020 3	CSKA Sofia	1–1	Ludogorets Razgrad	Sofia
21:00 EEST (UTC+3)	Rodrigues (yellow card) 49'; Ahmedov (yellow card) 53'; Sowe 62'; Carey (yellow card) 70'	Report	Cicinho (yellow card) 8'; Biton 71'	Stadium: Balgarska Armia Stadium; Referee: Nikola Popov

8 July 2020 4	Ludogorets Razgrad	3–0	Levski Sofia	Razgrad
18:30 EEST (UTC+3)	Moti 26' (pen.) (yellow card) 87'; Dyakov (yellow card) 28'; Tawatha (yellow card) 45+1'; Tchibota 66' (yellow card) 83'; Biton 75'; Abel (yellow card) 77'; Badji (yellow card) 86'	Report	Yurukov (yellow card) 18'; Lozev (yellow card) 58'; Goranov (yellow card) 86'	Stadium: Ludogorets Arena; Referee: Nikolay Yordanov

12 July 2020 5	Slavia Sofia	3–1	Ludogorets Razgrad	Sofia
21:00 EEST (UTC+3)	Krastev 12'; Kirilov 29'; Bengyuzov (yellow card) 36'; Popadyin 45+1'; Stoev (yellow card) 51'	Report	Bakalov (yellow card) 36'; Cicinho (red card) 37'; Biton 73'; Badji (yellow card) 82'	Stadium: Stadion Slavia; Referee: Valentin Zhelezov

=== Bulgarian Cup ===
25 September 2019 First Round	Neftochimic	1–4	Ludogorets Razgrad	Sozopol
20:00 EEST (UTC+3)	Apostolov 12' (yellow card) 66'; Filipov (yellow card) 19'; M.Radev (yellow card) 55'; M.Georgiev (yellow card) 67'	Report	Moți (yellow card) 45+1'; Tchibota 53', 76', 90+2'; Lukoki 60'	Stadium: Arena Sozopol; Attendance: 500; Referee: Dimitar Burov

4 December 2019 Round of 16	Septemvri Sofia	0–3	Ludogorets Razgrad	Sofia
13:30 EET (UTC+2)	Bashliev (yellow card) 45+2'; Stoyanov (yellow card) 55'; S.Nikolov (yellow card) 57'	Report	Moți 10'; Świerczok (yellow card) 16' (goal) 18'; Tchibota 56' (pen.)	Stadium: Stadion Dragalevtsi; Attendance: 60; Referee: Georgi Nikolov

5 March 2020 Quarterfinal	Levski Sofia	0–0 (a.e.t.) (6–5 p)	Ludogorets Razgrad	Sofia
19:00 EET (UTC+2)	Reis (yellow card) 26'; Kargas (yellow card) 38'; Thiam (yellow card) 54'; Eyjólfsson (yellow card) 90+3'; Milanov (yellow card) 90+4'	Report	Nedyalkov (yellow card) 17'; Grigore (penalty missed) 90+5'; Cicinho (yellow card) 91'; Świerczok (yellow card) 111'; Marcelinho (yellow card) 117'	Stadium: Vivacom Arena – Georgi Asparuhov; Attendance: 7,500; Referee: Dragomir Draganov
	Penalties
	Milanov (penalty scored); Goranov (penalty scored); Robertha (penalty scored); Spierings (penalty scored); Thiam (penalty scored); Eyjólfsson (penalty scored)		(penalty scored) Moți; (penalty scored) Świerczok; (penalty scored) Grigore; (penalty scored) Cauly; (penalty scored) Marcelinho; (penalty missed) Tchibota

=== UEFA Champions League ===
==== Qualifying rounds ====
10 July 2019 First qualifying round 1st leg	Ferencváros (Hungary)	2–1	(Bulgaria) Ludogorets Razgrad	Budapest, Hungary
21:00 EEST (UTC+3)	Nguen 6'; Zubkov 65'; Sigér (yellow card) 85'	Report	Świerczok 31'; Moți (yellow card) 51'; Góralski (yellow card) 61'	Stadium: Groupama Arena; Attendance: 18,115; Referee: Eitan Shemeulevitch (Israel)

17 July 2019 First qualifying round 2nd leg	Ludogorets Razgrad (Bulgaria)	2–3 (3–5 agg.)	(Hungary) Ferencváros	Razgrad, Bulgaria
20:30 EEST (UTC+3)	Terziev 24'; Heister 69' (o.g.); Moți (red card) 82'; Tchibota (yellow card) 85'	Report	Kharatin 17'; Škvarka 21'; Ihnatenko (yellow card) 26'; Dibusz (yellow card) 28'; Lovrencsics (yellow card) 28'; Nguen 48'	Stadium: Ludogorets Arena; Attendance: 7,365; Referee: Donatas Rumšas (Lithuania)

=== UEFA Europa League ===
==== Qualifying rounds ====
25 July 2019 2QR 1st leg	Valur (Iceland)	1–1	(Bulgaria) Ludogorets Razgrad	Reykjavík, Iceland
22:00 EEST (UTC+3)	Petry 11'; Sigurbjörnsson (yellow card) 20'; Ómarsson (yellow card) 51'; Pedersen (yellow card) 79'; Í.Jónsson (yellow card) 81'	Report	Cicinho (yellow card) 28'; Anicet (yellow card) 32' (goal) 90+2'; Terziev (yellow card) 53'	Stadium: Hlíðarendi; Attendance: 802; Referee: Georgios Kominis (Greece)

1 August 2019 2QR 2nd leg	Ludogorets Razgrad (Bulgaria)	4–0 (5–1 agg.)	(Iceland) Valur	Razgrad, Bulgaria
20:30 EEST (UTC+3)	Hedlund 7' (o.g.); Ikoko 24'; Świerczok 82', 84'	Report	Pedersen (yellow card) 34'; K.Halldórsson (yellow card) 35'; H.Sigurðsson (yellow card) 50'	Stadium: Ludogorets Arena; Attendance: 4,120; Referee: Pavel Orel (Czech Republic)

8 August 2019 3QR 1st leg	Ludogorets Razgrad (Bulgaria)	5–0	(Wales) The New Saints	Razgrad, Bulgaria
20:30 EEST (UTC+3)	Harrington 10' (o.g.); Tchibota 28'; Lukoki 43'; Keșerü 65'; Moți 76'	Report	Routledge (yellow card) 35'	Stadium: Ludogorets Arena; Attendance: 4,120; Referee: Marius Avram (Romania)

15 August 2019 3QR 2nd leg	The New Saints (Wales)	0–4 (0–9 agg.)	(Bulgaria) Ludogorets Razgrad	Wrexham, Wales
20:30 EEST (UTC+3)	Davies (yellow card) 22'	Report	Świerczok 36', 77'; Lukoki 42'; Grigore (yellow card) 64'; Forster (yellow card) 67'; Biton 90+2'	Stadium: Racecourse Ground; Attendance: 712; Referee: Kristo Tohver (Estonia)
Note: The New Saints played their home match at Racecourse Ground, Wrexham, instead of their regular stadium Park Hall, Oswestry due to UEFA regulations.

22 August 2019 PO 1st leg	Ludogorets Razgrad (Bulgaria)	0–0	(Slovenia) Maribor	Razgrad, Bulgaria
20:30 EEST (UTC+3)	Nedyalkov (yellow card) 38'; Badji (yellow card) 67'; Forster (yellow card) 83'	Report	Hotić (yellow card) 51' (yellow-red card) 57'; Pirić (yellow card) 90+2'	Stadium: Ludogorets Arena; Attendance: 6,200; Referee: Jakob Kehlet (Denmark)

29 August 2019 PO 2nd leg	Maribor (Slovenia)	2–2 (2–2 (a) agg.)	(Bulgaria) Ludogorets Razgrad	Maribor, Slovenia
21:15 EEST (UTC+3)	Peričić (yellow card) 26'; Vrhovec (yellow card) 56'; Viler (yellow card) 60'; Tavares 65'; Vancaš 72'; Klinar (yellow card) 87'	Report	Marcelinho (yellow card) 16' (goal) 17'; Keșerü 26' (pen.); Moți (yellow card) 34'; Nedyalkov (yellow card) 39'; Cicinho (yellow card) 71'; Forster (yellow card) 89'	Stadium: Ljudski vrt Attendance: 9,016; Referee: Craig Pawson (England)

==== Group stage ====
Pos	Team	Pld	W	D	L	GF	GA	GD	Pts	Qualification
1	(Spain) Espanyol	6	3	2	1	12	4	+8	11	Advance to knockout phase
2	(Bulgaria) Ludogorets Razgrad	6	2	2	2	10	10	0	8	Advance to knockout phase
3	(Hungary) Ferencváros	6	1	4	1	5	7	−2	7	
4	(Russia) CSKA Moscow	6	1	2	3	3	9	−6	5	

Source: UEFA
Rules for classification: Group stage tiebreakers

19 September 2019 1	Ludogorets Razgrad (Bulgaria)	5–1	(Russia) CSKA Moscow	Razgrad, Bulgaria
22:00 EEST (UTC+3)	Wanderson 48'; Lukoki 50'; Keșerü 52', 68', 73' (pen.); Cicinho (yellow card) 85'	Report	Diveyev 11'; Karpov (yellow card) 61'; Akinfeev (yellow card) 72'	Stadium: Ludogorets Arena; Attendance: 8,423; Referee: Irfan Peljto (Bosnia and Herzegovina)

3 October 2019 2	Ferencváros (Hungary)	0–3	(Bulgaria) Ludogorets Razgrad	Budapest, Hungary
19:55 EEST (UTC+3)	Heister (yellow card) 26'	Report	Lukoki 1' (yellow card) 44'; Grigore (yellow card) 28' (yellow-red card) 43'; Rafael Forster 40', 64'	Stadium: Groupama Arena; Attendance: 16,163; Referee: Bartosz Frankowski (Poland)

24 October 2019 3	Ludogorets Razgrad (Bulgaria)	0–1	(Spain) Espanyol	Razgrad, Bulgaria
19:55 EEST (UTC+3)	Cicinho (yellow card) 15'; Moți (yellow card) 25'; Anicet (yellow card) 60'	Report	Campuzano 13'; J.López (yellow card) 85' (yellow-red card) 88'; Iturraspe (yellow card) 87'; L.López (yellow card) 90+2'	Stadium: Ludogorets Arena; Attendance: 10,334; Referee: Aliyar Aghayev (Azerbaijan)

7 November 2019 4	Espanyol (Spain)	6–0	(Bulgaria) Ludogorets Razgrad	Cornellà de Llobregat, Spain
22:00 EET (UTC+2)	Melendo 4'; L.López 19'; Vargas 36' (pen.); Campuzano 52'; Pedrosa 73'; Ferreyra 76'	Report	Forster (red card) 12'; Góralski (yellow card) 25' (yellow-red card) 35'; Badji (yellow card) 90'; Lukoki (yellow card) 90+1'	Stadium: RCDE Stadium; Attendance: 13,963; Referee: François Letexier (France)

28 November 2019 5	CSKA Moscow (Russia)	1–1	(Bulgaria) Ludogorets Razgrad	Moscow, Russia
19:55 EET (UTC+2)	Chalov (yellow card) 60' (goal) 76'	Report	Keșerü (yellow card) 35' (goal) 66'; Anicet (yellow card) 81'	Stadium: VEB Arena; Attendance: 12,948; Referee: Jakob Kehlet (Denmark)

12 December 2019 6	Ludogorets Razgrad (Bulgaria)	1–1	(Hungary) Ferencváros	Razgrad, Bulgaria
22:00 EET (UTC+2)	Lukoki 24'; Terziev (yellow card) 59'	Report	Frimpong (yellow card) 27'; Botka (yellow card) 66'; Signevich 90+5'	Stadium: Ludogorets Arena; Attendance: 5,528; Referee: Matej Jug (Slovenia)

==== Knockout phase ====
20 February 2020 Round of 32 1st leg	Ludogorets Razgrad (Bulgaria)	0–2	(Italy) Inter Milan	Razgrad, Bulgaria
19:55 EET (UTC+2)	Grigore (yellow card) 43'; Wanderson (yellow card) 61'; Tchibota (yellow card) 85'; Abel (yellow card) 90+4'	Report	Martínez (yellow card) 22'; Eriksen 71'; Lukaku 90+5' (pen.)	Stadium: Ludogorets Arena; Attendance: 10,024; Referee: Carlos del Cerro Grande (Spain)

27 February 2020 Round of 32 2nd leg	Inter Milan (Italy)	2–1 (4–1 agg.)	(Bulgaria) Ludogorets Razgrad	Milan, Italy
22:00 EET (UTC+2)	D'Ambrosio (yellow card) 22'; Biraghi 32'; Lukaku 45+4'	Report	Cauly 26'; Wanderson (yellow card) 70'	Stadium: San Siro; Attendance: 0 Referee: Daniel Siebert (Germany)
Note: The match between Inter Milan and Ludogorets Razgrad in Milan was played behind closed doors due to an outbreak of COVID-19 in Italy.

== Squad statistics ==
As of match played 12 July 2020

=== Appearances and goals ===
No.	Pos	Nat	Player	Total		A Group		Bulgarian Cup		Super Cup		Champions League		Europa League	
No.	Pos	Nat	Player	Apps	Goals	Apps	Goals	Apps	Goals	Apps	Goals	Apps	Goals	Apps	Goals
3	DF	(Bulgaria) BUL	Anton Nedyalkov	43	0	23+3	0	1	0	1	0	2	0	13	0
4	DF	(Brazil) BRA	Cicinho	34	0	17+1	0	2	0	1	0	0+1	0	12	0
5	DF	(Bulgaria) BUL	Georgi Terziev	36	1	22+2	0	3	0	0	0	2	1	7	0
6	DF	(Israel) ISR	Taleb Tawatha	7	0	4+2	0	1	0	0	0	0	0	0	0
7	MF	(Bulgaria) BUL	Dimo Bakalov	21	1	4+14	1	2	0	0+1	0	0	0	0	0
8	MF	(Israel) ISR	Dan Biton	34	6	14+7	5	2	0	0+1	0	1+1	0	3+5	1
10	FW	(Poland) POL	Jakub Świerczok	35	12	12+9	6	1+1	1	0	0	2	1	2+8	4
11	DF	(Bulgaria) BUL	Stanislav Manolev	17	1	8+7	1	1	0	0	0	0	0	1	0
12	MF	(Madagascar) MAD	Anicet Abel	35	2	19+3	1	1	0	0	0	0	0	11+1	1
13	FW	(Republic of the Congo) CGO	Mavis Tchibota	41	13	19+6	7	2+1	4	1	1	2	0	4+6	1
17	MF	(Guinea-Bissau) GBS	Jorginho	30	7	17+5	7	1	0	0	0	1+1	0	4+1	0
18	MF	(Bulgaria) BUL	Svetoslav Dyakov	34	0	16+6	0	2	0	1	0	2	0	3+4	0
20	MF	(Bulgaria) BUL	Serkan Yusein	3	0	2+1	0	0	0	0	0	0	0	0	0
21	DF	(Romania) ROU	Dragoș Grigore	28	0	17	0	1+1	0	1	0	0	0	7+1	0
22	DF	(Democratic Republic of the Congo) COD	Jordan Ikoko	27	2	15+3	1	1	0	1	0	2	0	2+3	1
23	GK	(Bulgaria) BUL	Plamen Iliev	31	0	16	0	1	0	1	0	1	0	12	0
25	MF	(Senegal) SEN	Stéphane Badji	37	0	17+4	0	2	0	0	0	0+1	0	11+2	0
27	GK	(Bulgaria) BUL	Vladislav Stoyanov	8	0	7	0	1	0	0	0	0	0	0	0
28	FW	(Romania) ROU	Claudiu Keșerü	34	18	13+6	12	1	0	1	0	0+1	0	11+1	6
30	DF	(Romania) ROU	Cosmin Moți	23	4	11+1	2	2+1	1	0+1	0	2	0	4+1	1
33	GK	(Brazil) BRA	Renan	12	0	8	0	1	0	0	0	1	0	2	0
50	MF	(Bulgaria) BUL	Tsvetoslav Petrov	1	0	0+1	0	0	0	0	0	0	0	0	0
51	FW	(Bulgaria) BUL	Ilker Budinov	2	0	0+1	0	0+1	0	0	0	0	0	0	0
64	MF	(Bulgaria) BUL	Dominik Yankov	1	0	1	0	0	0	0	0	0	0	0	0
82	MF	(Bulgaria) BUL	Ivan Yordanov	3	0	0+2	0	0+1	0	0	0	0	0	0	0
84	MF	(Bulgaria) BUL	Marcelinho	31	6	12+4	5	1+1	0	1	0	1+1	0	9+1	1
88	MF	(Bulgaria) BUL	Wanderson	38	6	17+5	5	1+1	0	0	0	0	0	11+3	1
90	DF	(Brazil) BRA	Rafael Forster	18	2	8	0	0	0	0	0	0	0	10	2
95	MF	(Brazil) BRA	Cauly	13	4	9+1	3	1	0	0	0	0	0	2	1
Players away from the club on loan:
Players who appeared for Ludogorets Razgrad that left during the season:
44	MF	(Poland) POL	Jacek Góralski	22	0	8+3	0	1	0	1	0	2	0	5+2	0
92	MF	(Democratic Republic of the Congo) COD	Jody Lukoki	24	10	7+4	3	0+1	1	1	1	1	0	8+2	5

=== Goal scorers ===
Place	Position	Nation	Number	Name	A Group	Bulgarian Cup	Supercup	Champions League	Europa League	Total
1	FW	(Romania)	28	Claudiu Keșerü	12	0	0	0	6	18
2	FW	(Republic of the Congo)	13	Mavis Tchibota	7	4	1	0	1	13
3	FW	(Poland)	10	Jakub Świerczok	6	1	0	1	4	12
4	MF	(Democratic Republic of the Congo)	92	Jody Lukoki	3	1	1	0	5	10
5	MF	(Guinea-Bissau)	17	Jorginho	7	0	0	0	0	7
6	MF	(Bulgaria)	84	Marcelinho	5	0	0	0	1	6
6	MF	(Bulgaria)	88	Wanderson	5	0	0	0	1	6
6	MF	(Israel)	8	Dan Biton	5	0	0	0	1	6
9	MF	(Brazil)	95	Cauly	3	0	0	0	1	4
9	DF	(Romania)	30	Cosmin Moți	2	1	0	0	1	4
11				Own goal	0	0	0	1	2	3
12	DF	(Democratic Republic of the Congo)	22	Jordan Ikoko	1	0	0	0	1	2
12	MF	(Madagascar)	12	Anicet Abel	1	0	0	0	1	2
12	DF	(Brazil)	90	Rafael Forster	0	0	0	0	2	2
15	DF	(Bulgaria)	11	Stanislav Manolev	1	0	0	0	0	1
15	MF	(Bulgaria)	7	Dimo Bakalov	1	0	0	0	0	1
15	DF	(Bulgaria)	5	Georgi Terziev	0	0	0	1	0	1
TOTALS					59	7	2	3	27	98

=== Clean sheets ===
Place	Position	Nation	Number	Name	A Group	Bulgarian Cup	Supercup	Champions League	Europa League	Total
1	GK	(Bulgaria)	23	Plamen Iliev	9	0	1	0	4	14
2	GK	(Brazil)	33	Renan	6	1	0	0	1	8
3	GK	(Bulgaria)	27	Vladislav Stoyanov	1	1	0	0	0	2
TOTALS					16	2	1	0	5	24

=== Disciplinary record ===
Number	Nation	Position	Name	A Group		Bulgarian Cup		Supercup		Champions League		Europa League		Total	
Number	Nation	Position	Name	Yellow card	Red card	Yellow card	Red card	Yellow card	Red card	Yellow card	Red card	Yellow card	Red card	Yellow card	Red card
3	(Bulgaria)	DF	Anton Nedyalkov	3	0	1	0	0	0	0	0	2	0	6	0
4	(Brazil)	DF	Cicinho	5	2	1	0	1	0	0	0	4	0	11	2
5	(Bulgaria)	DF	Georgi Terziev	4	0	0	0	0	0	0	0	2	0	6	0
6	(Israel)	DF	Taleb Tawatha	1	0	0	0	0	0	0	0	0	0	1	0
7	(Bulgaria)	MF	Dimo Bakalov	1	0	0	0	0	0	0	0	0	0	1	0
8	(Israel)	MF	Dan Biton	1	0	0	0	0	0	0	0	0	0	1	0
10	(Poland)	FW	Jakub Świerczok	2	0	2	0	0	0	0	0	0	0	4	0
11	(Bulgaria)	DF	Stanislav Manolev	4	0	0	0	0	0	0	0	0	0	4	0
12	(Madagascar)	MF	Anicet Abel	5	0	0	0	0	0	0	0	4	0	9	0
13	(Republic of the Congo)	FW	Mavis Tchibota	5	0	0	0	0	0	1	0	1	0	7	0
18	(Bulgaria)	MF	Svetoslav Dyakov	4	0	0	0	0	0	0	0	0	0	4	0
20	(Bulgaria)	MF	Serkan Yusein	2	0	0	0	0	0	0	0	0	0	2	0
21	(Romania)	DF	Dragoș Grigore	4	0	0	0	1	0	0	0	4	1	9	1
22	(Democratic Republic of the Congo)	DF	Jordan Ikoko	4	0	0	0	0	0	0	0	0	0	4	0
23	(Bulgaria)	GK	Plamen Iliev	2	0	0	0	0	0	0	0	0	0	2	0
25	(Senegal)	MF	Stéphane Badji	5	0	0	0	0	0	0	0	2	0	7	0
27	(Bulgaria)	GK	Vladislav Stoyanov	1	0	0	0	0	0	0	0	0	0	1	0
28	(Romania)	FW	Claudiu Keșerü	3	0	0	0	0	0	0	0	1	0	4	0
30	(Romania)	DF	Cosmin Moți	6	0	1	0	0	0	1	1	2	0	10	1
33	(Brazil)	GK	Renan	1	0	0	0	0	0	0	0	0	0	1	0
64	(Bulgaria)	MF	Dominik Yankov	1	0	0	0	0	0	0	0	0	0	1	0
84	(Bulgaria)	MF	Marcelinho	3	0	1	0	0	0	0	0	1	0	5	0
88	(Bulgaria)	MF	Wanderson	5	0	0	0	0	0	0	0	2	0	7	0
90	(Brazil)	DF	Rafael Forster	2	0	0	0	0	0	0	0	3	1	5	1
Players away on loan:
Players who left Ludogorets Razgrad during the season:
44	(Poland)	MF	Jacek Góralski	5	0	0	0	1	0	1	0	2	1	9	1
92	(Democratic Republic of the Congo)	MF	Jody Lukoki	0	0	0	0	1	0	0	0	2	0	3	0
			TOTALS	78	3	6	0	4	0	3	1	32	3	124	7
