= Jakub Świerczok =

Polish footballer (born 1992)

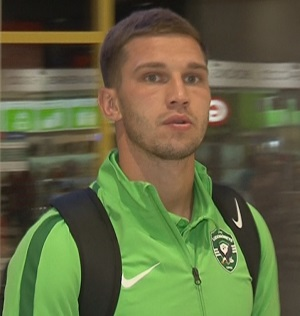
- Świerczok with Ludogorets Razgrad in 2019

Personal information
- Date of birth: 28 December 1992 (age 33)
- Place of birth: Tychy, Poland
- Height: 1.79 m (5 ft 10 in)
- Position: Striker

Youth career
- 2002–2003: MOSM Tychy
- 2003–2006: MK Górnik Katowice
- 2006: MOSM Tychy
- 2007: Cracovia
- 2008: SMS Kraków
- 2008–2009: Cracovia
- 2009–2011: Polonia Bytom

Senior career*
Years	Team	Apps	(Gls)
2011	Polonia Bytom	18	(12)
2012–2015	Kaiserslautern	6	(0)
2012–2015	Kaiserslautern II	23	(8)
2012–2013	→ Piast Gliwice (loan)	1	(0)
2015	Zawisza Bydgoszcz	15	(4)
2015–2016	Górnik Łęczna	31	(7)
2016–2017	GKS Tychy	30	(16)
2017–2018	Zagłębie Lubin	21	(16)
2018–2021	Ludogorets Razgrad	59	(24)
2020–2021	→ Piast Gliwice (loan)	28	(17)
2021	Piast Gliwice	0	(0)
2021–2023	Nagoya Grampus	14	(7)
2023	Zagłębie Lubin	5	(0)
2023–2024	Omiya Ardija	14	(5)
2024–2025	Śląsk Wrocław	10	(2)

International career
2011	Poland U20	1	(1)
2012	Poland U21	3	(0)
2017–2021	Poland	6	(1)
- * Club domestic league appearances and goals as of 14:22, 27 May 2025 (UTC)

Jakub Świerczok (Polish pronunciation: [ˈjakup ˈɕfjɛrt͡ʂɔk]; born 28 December 1992) is a Polish professional footballer who plays as a striker.

== Club career ==
Born in Tychy, Świerczok began his career at Polonia Bytom. After scoring 12 goals in 18 matches in the I liga, he joined Bundesliga club 1. FC Kaiserslautern on a three-and-a-half-year contract in January 2012.

On 16 June 2017, Świerczok signed a contract with Zagłębie Lubin. He was a member of Zagłębie's squad for half season, scoring 17 goals in 25 games in all competition.

=== Ludogorets Razgrad ===
On 19 January 2018, Świerczok completed a move to Bulgarian club Ludogorets Razgrad for €1 million on a long-term contract. He made his debut for the team on 15 February 2018 in a Europa League Round of 32 match against Italian grand Milan. At the end of the week he completed his First League debut against Botev Plovdiv. His debut goal came on 23 March 2018 in a league match against Etar. On 6 April 2018, coming as a substitute, he helped his team to take the title derby against CSKA Sofia by scoring 2 goals for the 3–2 win.

=== Nagoya Grampus ===
On 20 July 2021, Nagoya Grampus announced the signing of Świerczok from Piast Gliwice. In December 2021, Świerczok was suspended from football activities after testing positive for a banned substance in a doping test conducted after a match against Pohang Steelers, for the AFC Champions League. On 28 October 2022, Nagoya Grampus released a public statement, communicating the punishment issued by the AFC would be a 4-year ban for the player on all football-related activities, counting from 9 December 2021, where a provisional ban was issued against him.

=== Return to Zagłębie ===
In early February 2023, following an appeal, the Court of Arbitration for Sport overturned Świerczok's ban and cleared him of any wrongdoing. Shortly after, on 10 February 2023, he returned to Zagłębie Lubin on a deal until the end of the season, with a one-year extension option. On 30 May, it was announced he would leave the club at the end of June.

=== Omiya Ardija ===
On 6 July 2023, Świerczok returned to Japanese football after signing with J2 League side Omiya Ardija. On 30 September, in a match against Ōita Trinita, he left the pitch after 24 minutes after suffering a lateral collateral ligament tear in his right knee. Despite Omiya suffering relegation to J3 League at the end of the 2023 season, Świerczok extended his contract for another year.

=== Śląsk Wrocław ===
On 17 September 2024, Świerczok joined Polish top-flight club Śląsk Wrocław for the remainder of the season. On 6 February 2025, Świerczok tore his right ACL during practice, prematurely ending his season.

== International career ==
Świerczok's first experience of international football came in 2011 with Poland U20. In 2012, he made three appearances for the Poland U21.

On 3 November 2017, Świerczok was called up to the Poland senior team for the first time, for their friendlies with Uruguay and Mexico. He made his debut on 10 November against Uruguay, replacing Kamil Wilczek for the final 23 minutes.

== Personal life ==
In March 2020, Świerczok and his girlfriend helped out a 73-year-old woman who had fainted near her home in Razgrad, by moving her away from the road and calling the medical emergency services.

== Career statistics ==
=== Club ===
As of match played 3 February 2025

Appearances and goals by club, season and competition
Club	Season	League			National cup (Note: Includes Polish Cup, Bulgarian Cup, Emperor's Cup)		League cup (Note: Includes J.League Cup)		Continental		Other		Total	
Club	Season	Division	Apps	Goals	Apps	Goals	Apps	Goals	Apps	Goals	Apps	Goals	Apps	Goals
Polonia Bytom	2011–12	I liga	18	12	2	0	—		—		—		20	12
1. FC Kaiserslautern	2011–12	Bundesliga	6	0	0	0	—		—		—		6	0
1. FC Kaiserslautern II	2011–12	Regionalliga	9	3	—		—		—		—		9	3
1. FC Kaiserslautern II	2013–14	Regionalliga	4	2	—		—		—		—		4	2
1. FC Kaiserslautern II	2014–15	Regionalliga	10	3	—		—		—		—		10	3
1. FC Kaiserslautern II	Total		23	8	—		—		—		—		23	8
Piast Gliwice (loan)	2012–13	Ekstraklasa	1	0	0	0	—		—		—		0	0
Zawisza Bydgoszcz	2014–15	Ekstraklasa	15	4	0	0	—		—		—		15	4
Górnik Łęczna	2015–16	Ekstraklasa	31	7	1	0	—		—		—		32	7
GKS Tychy	2016–17	I liga	30	16	1	0	—		—		—		31	16
Zagłębie Lubin	2017–18	Ekstraklasa	21	16	4	1	—		—		—		25	17
Ludogorets Razgrad	2017–18	Bulgarian First League	12	7	—		—		2 (Note: Appearance(s) in UEFA Europa League)	0	—		14	7
Ludogorets Razgrad	2018–19	Bulgarian First League	25	11	1	2	—		9 (Note: Four appearances and four goals in UEFA Champions League, five appearances and one goal in UEFA Europa League)	5	1 (Note: Appearance in Bulgarian Supercup)	0	36	18
Ludogorets Razgrad	2019–20	Bulgarian First League	21	6	2	1	—		12 (Note: Two appearances and one goal in UEFA Champions League, ten appearances and four goals in UEFA Europa League)	5	0	0	35	12
Ludogorets Razgrad	2020–21	Bulgarian First League	1	0	—		—		—		0	0	1	0
Ludogorets Razgrad	Total		59	24	3	3	—		23	10	1	0	86	37
Piast Gliwice (loan)	2020–21	Ekstraklasa	23	15	3	1	—		1	1	—		27	17
Nagoya Grampus	2021	J1 League	14	7	2	1	3	1	2 (Note: Appearances in AFC Champions League)	3	—		21	12
Nagoya Grampus	2022	J1 League	0	0	0	0	0	0	—		—		0	0
Nagoya Grampus	Total		14	7	2	1	3	1	2	3	—		21	12
Zagłębie Lubin	2022–23	Ekstraklasa	5	0	—		—		—		—		5	0
Omiya Ardija	2023	J2 League	10	3	0	0	—		—		—		10	3
Omiya Ardija	2024	J3 League	4	2	0	0	—		—		—		4	2
Omiya Ardija	Total		14	5	0	0	—		—		—		14	5
Śląsk Wrocław	2024–25	Ekstraklasa	10	2	1	0	—		—		—		11	2
Career total			270	116	17	6	3	1	26	14	1	0	317	137

=== International ===
As of match played 23 June 2021

Appearances and goals by national team and year
National team	Year	Apps	Goals
Poland	2017	2	0
Poland	2018	1	0
Poland	2021	3	1
Total		6	1

As of match played 1 June 2021
Scores and results list Poland's goal tally first, score column indicates score after each Świerczok goal.

List of international goals scored by Jakub Świerczok
No.	Date	Venue	Opponent	Score	Result	Competition	Ref.
1	1 June 2021	Stadion Miejski, Wrocław, Poland	Russia	1–0	1–1	Friendly	

== Honours ==
Ludogorets

- Bulgarian League: 2017–18, 2018–19, 2019–20
- Bulgarian Supercup: 2018, 2019

Nagoya Grampus

- J.League Cup: 2021

Individual

- Ekstraklasa Player of the Month: December 2017, November 2020, December 2020, April 2021, May 2021
