= Renan (footballer, born 1989) =

Brazilian footballer

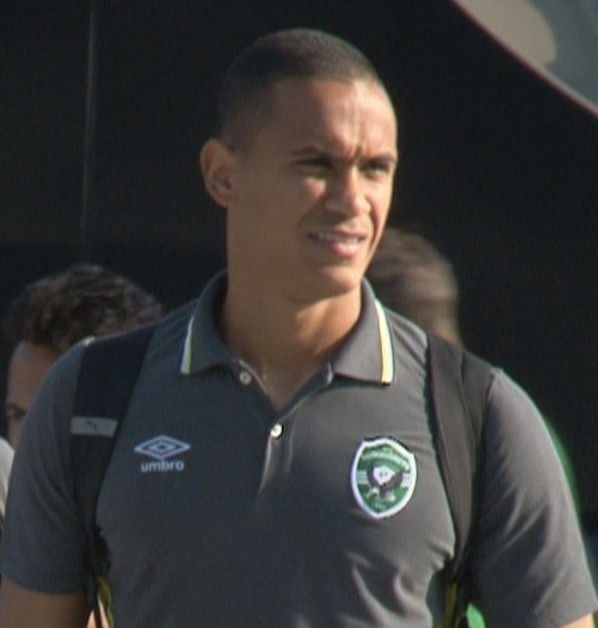
- Renan in 2018

Personal information
- Full name: Renan dos Santos
- Date of birth: 18 May 1989 (age 37)
- Place of birth: Rio de Janeiro, Brazil
- Height: 1.90 m (6 ft 3 in)
- Position: Goalkeeper

Team information
- Current team: Amazonas
- Number: 33

Youth career
- CFZ do Rio
- 2007–2008: Botafogo

Senior career*
Years	Team	Apps	(Gls)
2008–2015	Botafogo	87	(0)
2016	Avaí	56	(0)
2017–2021	Ludogorets Razgrad	59	(0)
2022	Atlético Goianiense	19	(0)
2023–2024	Sport Recife	37	(0)
2024	→ Juventude (loan)	2	(0)
2024	Santos	0	(0)
2025–	Amazonas	30	(0)
- * Club domestic league appearances and goals as of 10 November 2026

Renan dos Santos (born 18 May 1989), known simply as Renan, is a Brazilian footballer who plays as a goalkeeper for Amazonas.

== Career ==
=== Early career ===
Born in Rio de Janeiro, Renan started playing football as part of CFZ do Rio's youth squad. He joined Botafogo's youth squad in 2007.

=== Botafogo ===
Renan made his first team debut with Botafogo on 6 February 2008, starting in a 1–1 Campeonato Carioca home draw against Cabofriense. He started to feature more regularly in the 2008 Série A due to the injury of Castillo, debuting in the category on 11 May against Sport Recife at the Engenhão.

Renan started the 2009 season as a first-choice, but became a backup of Jefferson after his arrival. He was often used as Jefferson was away due to injuries or international duties, and completed 100 matches for the club on 11 September 2013, in a 1–0 home win over Corinthians.

On 7 December 2015, Renan left Fogão after eight years in the main squad and 130 matches overall.

=== Avaí ===
On 3 January 2016, Renan signed a one-year deal with Avaí in the Série B. He was an undisputed starter for the club, featuring in all 38 league matches as the club achieved promotion to the top tier.

On 4 January 2017, Renan announced his departure from the club.

=== Ludogorets Razgrad ===
On 7 January 2017, Renan signed with Bulgarian club Ludogorets Razgrad. He quickly established himself as the first choice goalkeeper. In 2019, he lost even more quickly his first choice position after the arrival of Plamen Iliev, eventually falling further down the pecking order after Vladislav Stoyanov's recovery from a serious injury.

On 18 June 2021, it was announced that Renan's contract had been terminated by mutual agreement and he was released from the club.

=== Atlético Goianiense ===
On 24 December 2021, Renan returned to his home country and signed for Atlético Goianiense. A backup to Luan Polli during the 2022 Campeonato Goiano, he shared the starting spot with Ronaldo in the 2022 Série A, suffering relegation.

=== Sport Recife ===
On 29 November 2022, Renan signed a two-year contract with Sport Recife. Despite being mainly a first-choice, he lost his starting spot to Denis towards the end of the season.

==== Loan to Juventude ====
On 18 December 2023, Renan moved to top tier side Juventude on a one-year loan deal. After just two matches, he suffered a calf injury which sidelined him for the remainder of the 2024 Campeonato Gaúcho, and upon returning, saw the club sign goalkeepers Gabriel and Mateus Claus, which pushed him to third-choice.

On 20 August 2024, Renan's loan with Ju was terminated, and he also rescinded his contract with Sport.

=== Santos ===
On 28 August 2024, Renan signed a contract with Santos until the end of the year. He left the club after his link expired, without making an appearance.

=== Amazonas ===
On 30 January 2025, Renan agreed to a deal with Amazonas.

== Personal life ==
On 8 May 2018 Renan received a Bulgarian passport.

== Career statistics ==
As of 14 July 2024

Club	Season	League			State league (Note: Includes Campeonato Carioca, Campeonato Catarinense, Campeonato Goiano, Campeonato Pernambucano and Campeonato Gaúcho)		Cup (Note: Includes Copa do Brasil and Bulgarian Cup)		Continental		Other		Total	
Club	Season	Division	Apps	Goals	Apps	Goals	Apps	Goals	Apps	Goals	Apps	Goals	Apps	Goals
Botafogo	2008	Série A	22	0	4	0	4	0	1 (Note: Appearance(s) in Copa Sudamericana)	0	—		31	0
Botafogo	2009	Série A	6	0	21	0	3	0	—		—		30	0
Botafogo	2010	Série A	2	0	5	0	0	0	—		—		7	0
Botafogo	2011	Série A	8	0	1	0	0	0	1	0	—		10	0
Botafogo	2012	Série A	6	0	0	0	1	0	0	0	—		7	0
Botafogo	2013	Série A	11	0	2	0	1	0	—		—		14	0
Botafogo	2014	Série A	4	0	7	0	0	0	0	0	—		11	0
Botafogo	2015	Série B	5	0	9	0	2	0	—		—		16	0
Botafogo	Total		64	0	49	0	11	0	2	0	—		128	0
Avaí	2016	Série B	38	0	17	0	4	0	—		1 (Note: Appearance(s) in Primeira Liga)	0	60	0
Ludogorets Razgrad	2016–17	First League	9	0	—		3	0	0	0	0	0	12	0
Ludogorets Razgrad	2017–18	First League	16	0	—		1	0	6 (Note: One appearance in UEFA Champions League, five appearances in UEFA Europa League)	0	0	0	23	0
Ludogorets Razgrad	2018–19	First League	19	0	—		1	0	10 (Note: Three appearances in UEFA Champions League, seven appearances in UEFA Europa League)	0	1 (Note: Appearance(s) in Bulgarian Supercup)	0	31	0
Ludogorets Razgrad	2019–20	First League	8	0	—		1	0	3 (Note: One appearance in UEFA Champions League, three appearances in UEFA Europa League)	0	0	0	12	0
Ludogorets Razgrad	2020–21	First League	5	0	—		0	0	2 (Note: Appearance(s) in UEFA Champions League)	0	1	0	8	0
Ludogorets Razgrad	Total		57	0	—		6	0	21	0	2	0	86	0
Atlético Goianiense	2022	Série A	16	0	3	0	1	0	4	0	—		24	0
Sport Recife	2023	Série B	24	0	13	0	4	0	—		12 (Note: Appearance(s) in Copa do Nordeste)	0	53	0
Juventude (loan)	2024	Série A	0	0	2	0	0	0	—		—		2	0
Santos	2024	Série B	0	0	—		—		—		—		0	0
Career total			199	0	84	0	26	0	27	0	15	0	351	0

== Honours ==
Botafogo

- Campeonato Carioca: 2010, 2013
- Campeonato Brasileiro Série B: 2015

Ludogorets

- Bulgarian First League: 2016–17, 2017–18, 2018–19, 2019–20
- Bulgarian Supercup: 2018, 2019

Atlético Goianiense

- Campeonato Goiano: 2022

Sport Recife

- Campeonato Pernambucano: 2023

Santos

- Campeonato Brasileiro Série B: 2024
