= Jacek Góralski =

Polish footballer (born 1992)

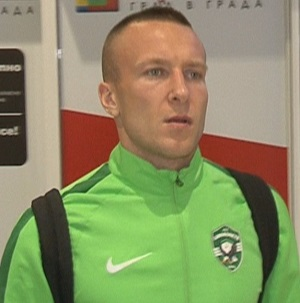
- Góralski with Ludogorets Razgrad in 2019

Personal information
- Full name: Jacek Góralski
- Date of birth: 21 September 1992 (age 34)
- Place of birth: Bydgoszcz, Poland
- Height: 1.72 m (5 ft 8 in)
- Position: Defensive midfielder

Team information
- Current team: Wisła Płock (scout)

Youth career
- –2011: Zawisza Bydgoszcz

Senior career*
Years	Team	Apps	(Gls)
2011	Victoria Koronowo	13	(0)
2011	Błękitni Gąbin	1	(0)
2011–2015	Wisła Płock	107	(5)
2015–2017	Jagiellonia Białystok	57	(3)
2017–2020	Ludogorets Razgrad	61	(0)
2020–2022	Kairat	26	(0)
2022–2023	VfL Bochum	4	(0)
2023–2026	Wieczysta Kraków	65	(1)
Total		334	(9)

International career
2016–2022	Poland	21	(1)
- * Club domestic league appearances and goals

Jacek Góralski ([ˈjat͡sɛk ɡuˈralskʲi]; born 21 September 1992) is a Polish former professional footballer who played as a midfielder. He currently works as a scout for Ekstraklasa club Wisła Płock.

== Club career ==
Góralski began his career with Zawisza Bydgoszcz, but left for Victoria Koronowo on a free transfer in early 2011. He joined Bulgarian champions Ludogorets Razgrad in the summer of 2017, signing a three-year contract.

On 19 January 2020, Góralski moved to Kairat on a three-year contract. On 16 June 2022, Kairat announced that Góralski was leaving the club. It was announced on 17 June 2022 that Góralski had joined VfL Bochum. On 10 August 2023, he left the club by mutual consent.

Despite reported interest from Ekstraklasa clubs Cracovia and Górnik Zabrze, and being linked with a return to Kairat, Góralski signed a three-year deal with fourth division side Wieczysta Kraków on 29 August 2023. He won three consecutive promotions with Wieczysta before being released in June 2026. On 4 September 2026, he announced his retirement from professional football.

== International career ==
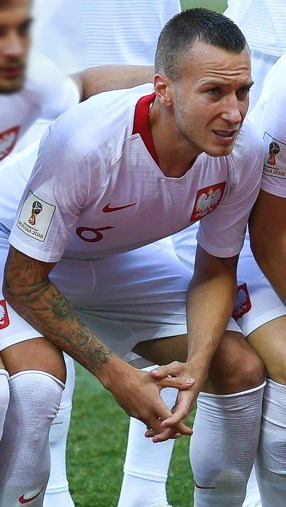
Góralski lining up for Poland at the 2018 FIFA World Cup

In November 2016, Góralski received his first call-up to the senior Poland squad for matches against Romania and Slovenia. He started the match against Slovenia, which resulted in a 1–1 draw.

On 4 June 2018, Góralski was included in Adam Nawałka's 23-man squad for the 2018 FIFA World Cup in Russia. Góralski played in two games in the tournament, against Colombia, a 0–3 loss, and Japan, a 1–0 victory.

== Post-playing career ==
On 9 September 2026, five days after announcing his retirement, Góralski was hired as a scout by his former club Wisła Płock.

== Career statistics ==
=== Club ===
Appearances and goals by club, season and competition
Club	Season	League			National cup (Note: Includes Polish Cup, Bulgarian Cup, Kazakhstan Cup)		Europe		Other		Total	
Club	Season	Division	Apps	Goals	Apps	Goals	Apps	Goals	Apps	Goals	Apps	Goals
Victoria Koronowo	2010–11	III liga, gr. C	13	0	—		—		—		13	0
Błękitni Gąbin	2011–12	IV liga Mazovia	1	0	—		—		—		1	0
Wisła Płock	2011–12	I liga	12	0	0	0	—		—		12	0
Wisła Płock	2012–13	II liga	32	1	2	0	—		—		34	1
Wisła Płock	2013–14	I liga	32	0	0	0	—		—		32	0
Wisła Płock	2014–15	I liga	31	4	1	0	—		—		32	4
Wisła Płock	Total		107	5	3	0	0	0	0	0	110	5
Jagiellonia Białystok	2015–16	Ekstraklasa	28	0	2	0	0	0	—		30	0
Jagiellonia Białystok	2016–17	Ekstraklasa	29	3	2	0	—		—		31	3
Jagiellonia Białystok	2017–18	Ekstraklasa	0	0	0	0	3 (Note: Appearance(s) in UEFA Europa League)	0	—		3	0
Jagiellonia Białystok	Total		57	3	4	0	3	0	—		64	3
Ludogorets Razgrad	2017–18	Bulgarian First League	24	0	3	0	7	0	0	0	34	0
Ludogorets Razgrad	2018–19	Bulgarian First League	26	0	1	0	10 (Note: One appearance in UEFA Champions League, nine appearances in UEFA Europa League)	0	0	0	37	0
Ludogorets Razgrad	2019–20	Bulgarian First League	11	0	1	0	9 (Note: Two appearances in UEFA Champions League, seven appearances in UEFA Europa League)	0	1 (Note: Appearance in Bulgarian Supercup)	0	22	0
Ludogorets Razgrad	Total		61	0	5	0	26	0	1	0	93	0
Kairat	2020	Kazakhstan Premier League	16	0	0	0	2	0	—		18	0
Kairat	2021	Kazakhstan Premier League	3	0	4	0	4 (Note: Appearances in UEFA Europa Conference League)	0	0	0	11	0
Kairat	2022	Kazakhstan Premier League	7	0	0	0	0	0	1 (Note: Appearance in Kazakhstan Super Cup)	0	8	0
Kairat	Total		26	0	4	0	6	0	1	0	37	0
VfL Bochum	2022–23	Bundesliga	4	0	0	0	—		—		4	0
Wieczysta Kraków	2023–24	III liga, gr. IV	22	1	1	0	—		—		23	1
Wieczysta Kraków	2024–25	II liga	29	0	—		—		1 (Note: Appearance in II liga promotion play-offs)	0	30	0
Wieczysta Kraków	2025–26	I liga	13	0	1	0	—		—		14	0
Wieczysta Kraków	Total		64	1	2	0	—		1	0	67	1
Career total			333	9	18	0	35	0	3	0	389	9

=== International ===
Appearances and goals by national team and year
National team	Year	Apps	Goals
Poland	2016	1	0
Poland	2017	1	0
Poland	2018	7	0
Poland	2019	4	1
Poland	2020	4	0
Poland	2022	4	0
Total		21	1

Scores and results list Poland's goal tally first, score column indicates score after each Góralski goal.

List of international goals scored by Jacek Góralski
No.	Date	Venue	Opponent	Score	Result	Competition
1	19 November 2019	Stadion Narodowy, Warsaw, Poland	Slovenia	3–2	3–2	UEFA Euro 2020 qualification

== Honours ==
Wisła Płock

- II liga East: 2012–13

Ludogorets

- Bulgarian First League: 2017–18, 2018–19, 2019–20
- Bulgarian Supercup: 2019

Kairat

- Kazakhstan Premier League: 2020
- Kazakhstan Cup: 2021

Wieczysta Kraków

- III liga, group IV: 2023–24
