= Jordan Ikoko =

Congolese footballer (born 1994)

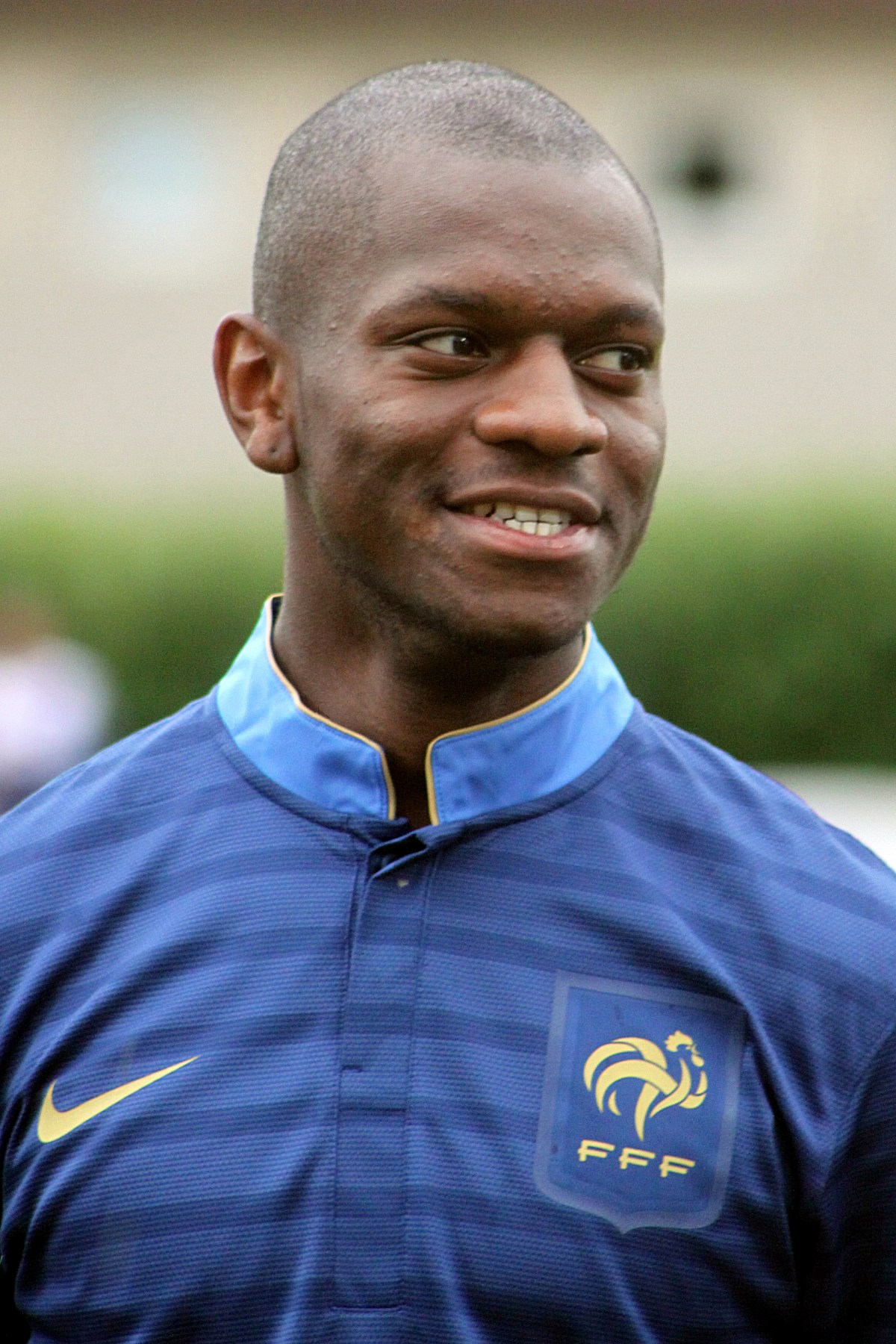
- Ikoko with France U19 in 2013

Personal information
- Full name: Jordan Ikoko
- Date of birth: 3 February 1994 (age 32)
- Place of birth: Montereau-Fault-Yonne, France
- Height: 1.77 m (5 ft 10 in)
- Position: Full-back

Youth career
- 2002–2004: Mitry Mory Football
- 2004–2007: USM Villeparisis
- 2007–2013: Paris Saint-Germain

Senior career*
Years	Team	Apps	(Gls)
2011–2013	Paris Saint-Germain B	44	(1)
2013–2016	Paris Saint-Germain	0	(0)
2013–2014	→ Créteil (loan)	26	(0)
2014–2015	→ Le Havre (loan)	20	(0)
2015–2016	→ Lens (loan)	33	(0)
2016–2019	Guingamp	75	(0)
2019–2022	Ludogorets Razgrad	51	(4)
2022	Ludogorets Razgrad II	2	(0)
2022–2024	Pafos	60	(0)
2025	Omonia 29M	15	(0)
2025–2026	Dinamo București	21	(0)

International career^{‡}
2009–2010	France U16	14	(1)
2010–2011	France U17	19	(1)
2012	France U18	5	(0)
2012–2013	France U19	12	(0)
2013–2014	France U20	8	(1)
2013	France U21	1	(0)
2017–2023	DR Congo	10	(0)
Medal record
Representing France
Men's football
UEFA European Under-19 Championship
Runner-up	2013 Lithuania
- * Club domestic league appearances and goals as of 23 May 2026 ‡ National team caps and goals as of 12 September 2023

Jordan Ikoko (born 3 February 1994) is a professional footballer who plays as a full-back.

Ikoko began his senior career with Paris Saint-Germain but did not make a first team appearance and spent time on loan at Créteil, Le Havre and Lens. In the summer of 2016, he joined Guingamp. Ikoko spent three seasons with the Ligue 1 team and totalled 83 competitive appearances before moving to Ludogorets in June 2019.

Ikoko was born in France and represented the country from under-16 to under-21 level. He then changed his allegiance to DR Congo, for whom he made his senior international debut in 2017.

== Career ==
=== Paris Saint-Germain and loans ===
Born in Montereau, France, Ikoko is a youth product of Paris Saint-Germain.

Ikoko made his Ligue 2 debut with Créteil on 16 August 2013 in a 3–0 away defeat against SM Caen. He replaced Augusto Pereira Loureiro in the 63rd minute. One week later, he played the full 90 minutes against FC Istres in a 2–2 home draw.

On 15 July 2014, Ikoko was loaned to Ligue 2 club Le Havre.

On 23 July 2015, Ikoko joined Ligue 2 club Lens for a season-long loan deal.

=== Guingamp ===
On 19 June 2016, Ikoko signed a three-year contract with Guingamp. He made his competitive debut on 12 August in the club's opening game of the Ligue 1 season, playing the full 90 minutes in a 2–2 draw against Monaco at Stade Louis II.

On 13 August 2017, Ikoko scored an own goal in a 0–3 home defeat to Paris Saint-Germain.

=== Ludogorets ===
On 16 June 2019, Ikoko signed a contract with Bulgarian club Ludogorets Razgrad for a reported transfer fee of €1 million. He made his debut in the 2019 Bulgarian Supercup on 3 July at Vasil Levski National Stadium, playing the full 90 minutes as Ludogorets won against Lokomotiv Plovdiv.

=== Pafos ===
In August 2022, he joined the ranks of Cypriot team Pafos. On 1 July 2024, Pafos announced that Ikoko had left the club at the end of his contract.

=== PAC Omonia 29M ===
On 23 December 2024, PAC Omonia 29M announced the signing of Ikoko.

== International career ==
Ikoko was born in France to parents of Congolese descent. He was a youth international for France at various levels. He was formally capped by the DR Congo national football team in a friendly 2–0 loss to Cameroon on 5 January 2017. He was also selected in DR Congo's final squad for the 2017 Africa Cup of Nations in Gabon where he played his first official match for the DR Congo national football team in 2–2 draw against Ivory Coast.

== Career statistics ==
=== Club ===
As of match played 29 May 2026

Appearances and goals by club, season and competition
Club	Season	League			National cup (Note: Includes Coupe de France, Bulgarian Cup, Cypriot Cup, Cupa României)		League cup (Note: Includes Coupe de la Ligue)		Europe		Other		Total	
Club	Season	Division	Apps	Goals	Apps	Goals	Apps	Goals	Apps	Goals	Apps	Goals	Apps	Goals
Paris Saint-Germain B	2010–11	Championnat National 2	5	0	—		—		—		—		5	0
Paris Saint-Germain B	2011–12	Championnat National 2	21	1	—		—		—		—		21	1
Paris Saint-Germain B	2012–13	Championnat National 2	18	0	—		—		—		—		18	0
Paris Saint-Germain B	Total		44	1	—		—		—		—		44	1
Créteil (loan)	2013–14	Ligue 2	26	0	2	0	2	0	—		—		30	0
Le Havre (loan)	2014–15	Ligue 2	20	0	0	0	1	0	—		—		21	0
Lens (loan)	2015–16	Ligue 2	33	0	0	0	1	0	—		—		34	0
Guingamp	2016–17	Ligue 1	27	0	3	0	2	0	—		—		32	0
Guingamp	2017–18	Ligue 1	28	0	2	0	0	0	—		—		30	0
Guingamp	2018–19	Ligue 1	20	0	0	0	1	0	—		—		21	0
Guingamp	Total		75	0	5	0	3	0	—		—		83	0
Ludogorets Razgrad	2019–20	Bulgarian First League	18	1	1	0	—		7 (Note: Two appearances in UEFA Champions League, five appearances and one goal in UEFA Europa League)	1	1 (Note: Appearance in Bulgarian Supercup)	0	27	2
Ludogorets Razgrad	2020–21	Bulgarian First League	18	0	4	0	—		6 (Note: Appearances in UEFA Europa League)	0	1	0	29	0
Ludogorets Razgrad	2021–22	Bulgarian First League	15	3	1	0	—		13 (Note: Eight appearances in UEFA Champions League, five appearances in UEFA Europa League)	0	1	0	30	3
Ludogorets Razgrad	Total		51	4	6	0	—		26	1	3	0	86	5
Pafos	2022–23	Cypriot First Division	32	0	4	0	—		—		—		36	0
Pafos	2023–24	Cypriot First Division	28	0	2	0	—		—		—		30	0
Pafos	Total		60	0	6	0	—		—		—		66	0
Omonia 29M	2024–25	Cypriot First Division	15	0	0	0	—		—		—		15	0
Dinamo București	2025–26	Liga I	21	0	3	0	—		—		1 (Note: Appearances in Liga I European play-offs)	0	25	0
Career total			345	5	22	0	7	0	26	1	4	0	404	6

=== International ===
As of match played 12 September 2023

Appearances and goals by national team and year
National team	Year	Apps	Goals
DR Congo	2017	6	0
DR Congo	2018	1	0
DR Congo	2019	1	0
DR Congo	2020	0	0
DR Congo	2021	0	0
DR Congo	2022	0	0
DR Congo	2023	2	0
Total		10	0

== Honours ==
Guingamp

- Coupe de la Ligue runner-up: 2018–19

Ludogorets

- Bulgarian First League: 2019–20, 2020–21, 2021–22
- Bulgarian Supercup: 2019, 2021

Pafos

- Cypriot Cup: 2023–24
