= David Ribeiro =

Brazilian footballer (born 1998)

Personal information
- Full name: David Ribeiro Pereira
- Date of birth: 23 April 1998 (age 28)
- Place of birth: São Vicente, São Paulo, Brazil
- Height: 1.87 m (6 ft 2 in)
- Position: Midfielder

Team information
- Current team: Orense

Youth career
- Santo André

Senior career*
Years	Team	Apps	(Gls)
2017–2019	Santo André	0	(0)
2017	→ São Paulo (loan)	0	(0)
2019	Ludogorets II	14	(1)
2019	Ludogorets	1	(0)
2019	→ Botev Vratsa (loan)	5	(0)
2020–2021	Red Bull Brasil	9	(0)
2021,2022	Santo André	?	(?)
2022	Maringá	?	(?)
- * Club domestic league appearances and goals as of 22:48, 1 December 2020 (UTC)

David Ribeiro Pereira (born 23 April 1998) is a Brazilian former footballer.

== Club career ==
=== São Paulo ===
In April 2017 Ribeiro was sent on loan to São Paulo from Santo André to spend the season with the reserves of São Paulo and play in the Copa Paulista with the option to be bought in the end of the season.

=== Ludogorets Razgrad ===
On 9 January 2019 Ribeiro joined on trials to the Bulgarian champions Ludogorets Razgrad on their winter camp. On 15 January he made his unofficial debut for the team in a friendly match against the Romanian team FC Botoșani. After playing in all the friendlies and leaving a good impression, on 14 February David signed with the club officially and was presented as Ludogorets players, but would spend the rest of the season with the reserve team to gain experience in Bulgarian football.

He scored his first unofficial goal for the doubles in a friendly match against Vihar Slavyanovo played on 17 February. Ribeiro made his official debut for Ludogorets II in the Bulgarian Second League on 24 February against Lokomotiv Sofia. He scored his debut goal in the Second League on 12 April in a 2:1 host lost against Pomorie. On 9 August he was sent on loan to Botev Vratsa until the end of the year. Although he played in only 5 matches until the half season due to injury, on 4 January 2020 he was expected to sign a permanent contract with Botev, but he returned to Brazil and joined Red Bull Brasil.

== Career statistics ==
=== Club ===
As of 25 May 2019.

Club	Season	League			National Cup		League Cup		Continental		Other		Total	
Club	Season	Division	Apps	Goals	Apps	Goals	Apps	Goals	Apps	Goals	Apps	Goals	Apps	Goals
Santo André	2017	–			1 (Note: Appearances in the Copa do Brasil)	0	0	0	–		5 (Note: Appearances in the Campeonato Paulista)	1	6	1
Santo André	2018	–			0	0	9 (Note: Appearances in the Copa Paulista)	3	–		3	0	12	3
Santo André	Total		0	0	1	0	17	4	0	0	8	1	18	4
São Paulo (loan)	2017	Série A	0	0	0	0	8	1	0	0	0	0	8	1
Ludogorets Razgrad II	2018–19	Second League	11	1	–		–		–		–		11	1
Ludogorets Razgrad	2018–19	First League	1	0	0	0	–		0	0	0	0	1	0
Career total			12	1	1	0	17	4	0	0	8	1	38	6

== Honours ==
Ludogorets

- First Professional Football League (1): 2018–19
- Bulgarian Supercup (1): 2019
