= Mavis Tchibota =

Congolese footballer

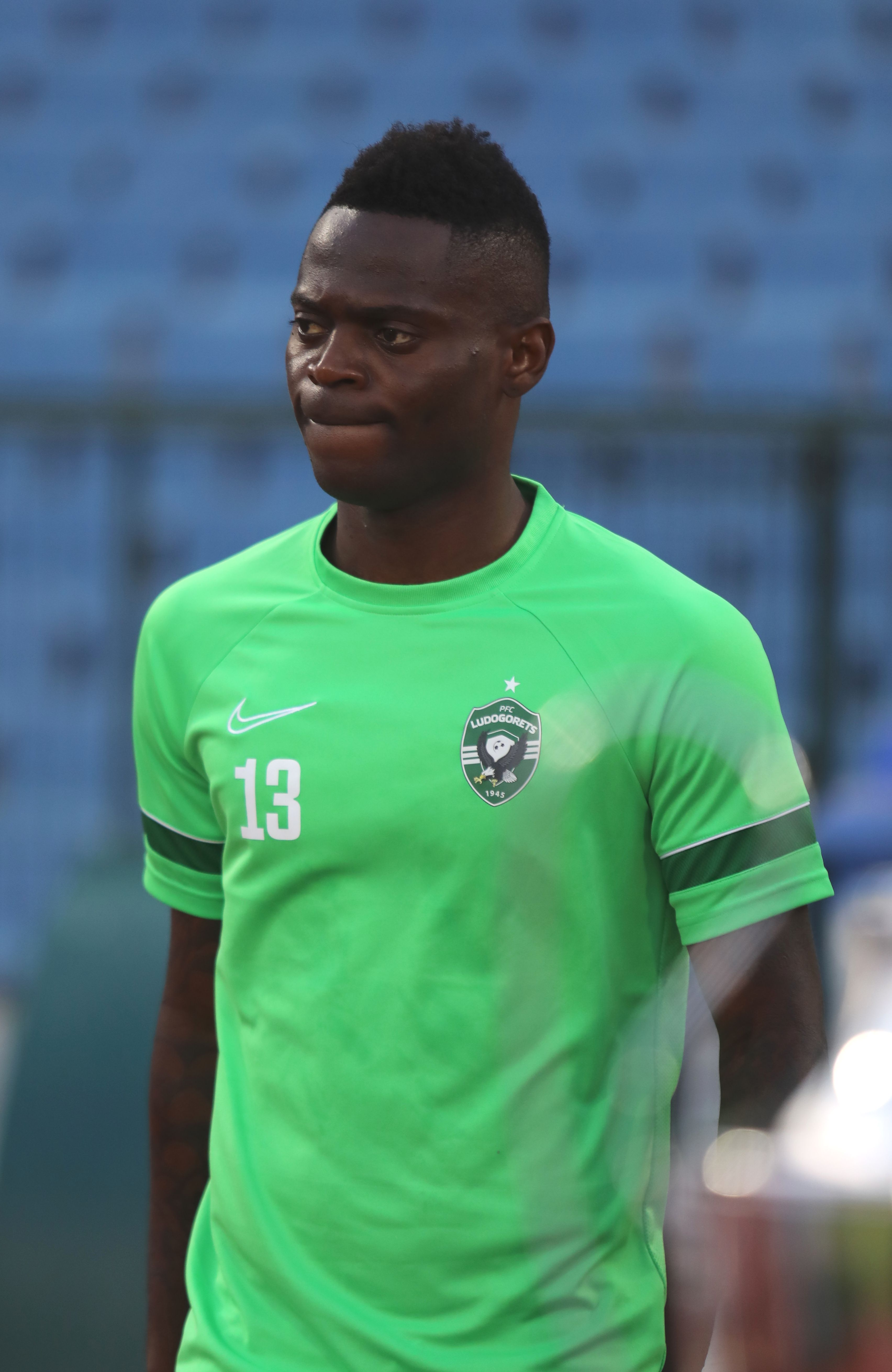
- Tchibota with Ludogorets Razgrad in 2021

Personal information
- Full name: Mavis Tchibota Dufounou
- Date of birth: 7 May 1996 (age 30)
- Place of birth: Pointe-Noire, Congo
- Height: 1.77 m (5 ft 9 1/2 in)
- Position: Left winger

Team information
- Current team: Hapoel Acre

Youth career
- –2013: Étoile du Congo
- 2014–2015: Maccabi Tel Aviv

Senior career*
Years	Team	Apps	(Gls)
2013–2014	Diables Noirs		
2015–2018	Maccabi Tel Aviv	0	(0)
2015–2017	→ Hapoel Kfar Saba (loan)	58	(8)
2017–2018	→ Bnei Yehuda (loan)	33	(8)
2018–2019	Bnei Yehuda	30	(11)
2019–2022	Ludogorets Razgrad	58	(13)
2022–2023	Maccabi Haifa	38	(2)
2023–2024	Hapoel Tel Aviv	29	(5)
2024–2025	Akron Tolyatti	2	(0)
2025	→ Bnei Sakhnin (loan)	6	(0)
2025–2026	Sepsi OSK	9	(0)
2026–	Hapoel Acre		

International career^{‡}
2011	Congo U17	4	(0)
2017–2023	Congo	10	(0)
- * Club domestic league appearances and goals as of 1 August 2026 ‡ National team caps and goals as of 10 September 2026

Mavis Tchibota Dufounou (Hebrew: מאויס צ'יבוטה דפונו; born 7 May 1996) is a Congolese professional footballer who plays as a winger for Hapoel Acre.

== Club career ==
Tchibota began his career in his native Congolese league playing for Diables Noirs, before officially joining the system of Israeli side Maccabi Tel Aviv in 2015. He spent the majority of his time out on loan with fellow Israeli Premier League side Hapoel Kfar Saba, joining in July 2015. He scored his opening senior goal in his second match, notching a seventy second-minute winner over Maccabi Haifa. Tchibota stayed for the 2015–16 and 2016–17 seasons, netting ten times in sixty-nine fixtures in all competitions for Hapoel Kfar Saba. Bnei Yehuda signed Tchibota on loan on 4 July 2017. Twelve months later, he was signed permanently via a swap for Maor Kandil.

On 19 February 2019, Bulgarian First League club Ludogorets Razgrad announced Tchibota had penned a pre-contract agreement with the club; effective from the succeeding June. He scored on his competitive debut for them, netting in their 2–0 Bulgarian Supercup victory over Lokomotiv Plovdiv on 3 July. After a further goal in UEFA Europa League qualifying against The New Saints, Tchibota scored his first league goal on 22 September versus Arda Kardzhali. He netted a hat-trick on 25 September in the Bulgarian Cup versus second tier team Neftochimic. In February 2022 Tchibota returned to Israel, joining Maccabi Haifa.

On 12 September 2024, Tchibota signed with Russian Premier League club Akron Tolyatti. On 27 January 2025, Tchibota returned to Israel and joined Bnei Sakhnin on loan. On 11 June 2025, his contract with Akron was terminated by mutual consent.

On 3 September 2025, Tchibota joined Sepsi OSK in Romania.

== International career ==
Tchibota was selected in the Congo under-17 squad for the 2011 FIFA U-17 World Cup in Mexico. He won four caps as his nation advanced from Group A, prior to losing in the following round to Uruguay. He received a stadium ovation from fans in Congo's tournament opener against the Netherlands. He represented the Congo under-20s in 2014. In September 2017, Tchibota was called up to the senior team for 2018 FIFA World Cup qualifiers against Ghana. He won his debut cap on 5 September as Congo lost 1–5 in Brazzaville. His second cap came in October 2020 in a friendly against Gambia.

== Personal life ==
Tchibota was born in Pointe-Noire, Republic of the Congo. He is the son of former Congo international footballer Pierre Tchibota. He arrived in Israel at the age of fifteen with his mother, though further difficulties delayed their entry to the local youth club of Maccabi Tel Aviv. In 2016, Tchibota applied for Israeli citizenship by marriage. In September 2017, he made his competitive debut for Congo. In January 2018, Tchibota received his temporary residence identity card. In May 2016, he married his Israeli partner Karolina in Cyprus. They have one daughter together named Adelle.

== Career statistics ==
=== Club ===
As of 12 December 2025.

Appearances and goals by club, season and competition
Club	Season	League			National cup (Note: Includes Israel State Cup, Bulgarian Cup, Russian Cup)		League cup (Note: Includes Toto Cup)		Continental		Other		Total	
Club	Season	Division	Apps	Goals	Apps	Goals	Apps	Goals	Apps	Goals	Apps	Goals	Apps	Goals
Hapoel Kfar Saba (loan)	2015–16	Israeli Premier League	29	3	4	1	2	0	—		—		35	4
Hapoel Kfar Saba (loan)	2016–17	Israeli Premier League	29	5	1	0	4	1	—		—		34	6
Hapoel Kfar Saba (loan)	Total		58	8	5	1	6	1	—		—		69	10
Bnei Yehuda (loan)	2017–18	Israeli Premier League	33	8	1	0	3	0	4 (Note: Appearances in UEFA Europa League)	1	1 (Note: Appearance in Israel Super Cup)	0	42	9
Bnei Yehuda	2018–19	Israeli Premier League	30	11	4	0	4	1	—		—		38	12
Ludogorets Razgrad	2019–20	First League	25	7	3	4	—		12 (Note: Two appearances in UEFA Champions League, ten appearances and one goal in UEFA Europa League)	1	1 (Note: Appearance in Bulgarian Supercup)	1	41	13
Ludogorets Razgrad	2020–21	First League	17	3	3	2	—		7 (Note: Five appearances in UEFA Champions League, two appearances and one goal in UEFA Europa League)	1	1	0	28	6
Ludogorets Razgrad	2021–22	First League	16	3	2	0	—		11 (Note: Appearances in UEFA Champions League, and appearances in UEFA Europa League)	0	1	1	30	4
Ludogorets Razgrad	Total		58	13	8	6	—		30	2	3	2	99	23
Maccabi Haifa	2021–22	Israeli Premier League	13	2	3	0	—		—		—		16	2
Maccabi Haifa	2022–23	Israeli Premier League	25	0	3	1	1	0	5 (Note: Appearances in UEFA Champions League)	0	0	0	34	1
Maccabi Haifa	Total		38	2	6	1	1	0	5	0	0	0	50	3
Hapoel Tel Aviv	2023–24	Israeli Premier League	29	5	1	0	4	1	—		—		34	6
Akron Tolyatti	2024–25	Russian Premier League	2	0	3	0	—		—		—		5	0
Bnei Sakhnin (loan)	2024–25	Israeli Premier League	6	0	0	0	—		—		—		6	0
Sepsi OSK	2025–26	Liga II	9	0	1	0	—		—		—		10	0
Career total			263	47	29	8	18	3	39	3	4	2	353	63

=== International ===
As of match played 10 September 2023

Appearances and goals by national team and year
National team	Year	Apps	Goals
Congo	2017	1	0
Congo	2020	3	0
Congo	2021	4	0
Congo	2022	1	0
Congo	2023	1	0
Total		10	0

== Honours ==
Diables Noirs

- Coupe du Congo: 2014

Bnei Yehuda

- Israel State Cup: 2018–19
- Israel Super Cup runner-up: 2017

Ludogorets Razgrad

- Bulgarian First League: 2019–20, 2020–21
- Bulgarian Supercup: 2019, 2021

Maccabi Haifa

- Israeli Premier League: 2021–22, 2022–23
- Israel State Cup runner-up: 2021–22
- Israel Super Cup: 2023
