= Georgi Terziev =

Bulgarian footballer

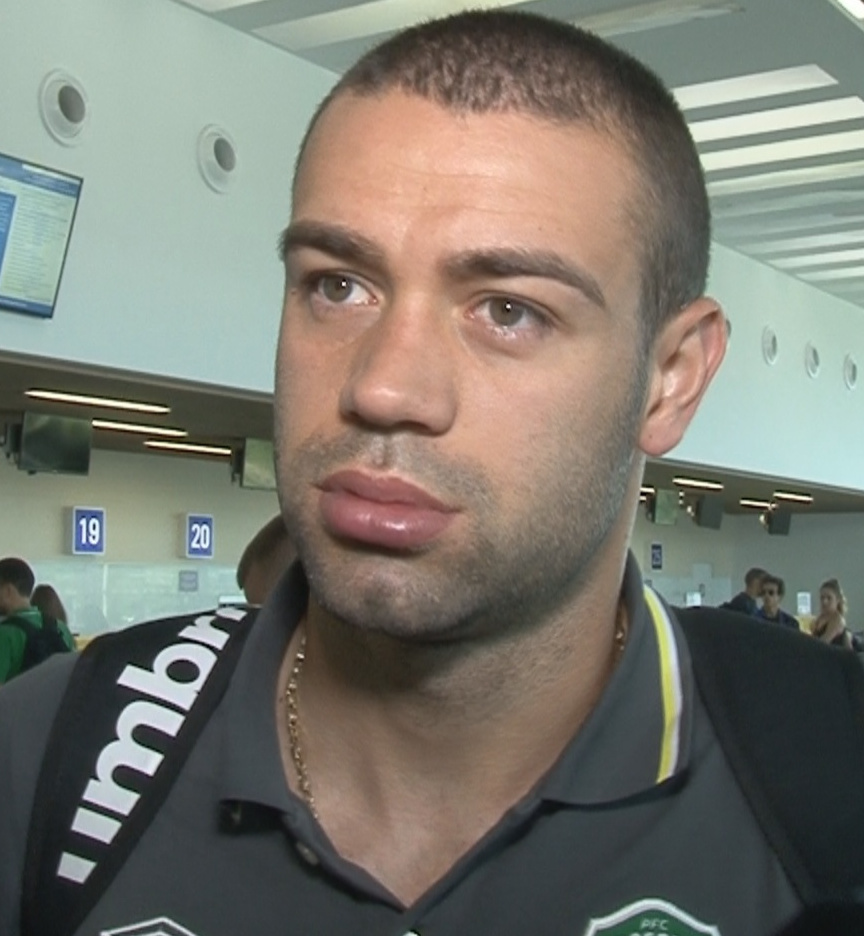

Personal information
- Full name: Georgi Ilkov Terziev
- Date of birth: 18 April 1992 (age 34)
- Place of birth: Sliven, Bulgaria
- Height: 1.83 m (6 ft 0 in)
- Position: Centre back

Team information
- Current team: Ludogorets Razgrad
- Number: 5

Youth career
- Sliven
- –2009: Naftex Burgas

Senior career*
Years	Team	Apps	(Gls)
2008–2009	Naftex Burgas	9	(0)
2009–2013	Chernomorets Burgas	73	(1)
2013–	Ludogorets Razgrad	162	(3)
2015–	Ludogorets Razgrad II	32	(1)
2017	→ Hajduk Split (loan)	8	(0)

International career^{‡}
2009–2010	Bulgaria U19	5	(0)
2009–2013	Bulgaria U21	18	(1)
2011–2020	Bulgaria	16	(0)
- * Club domestic league appearances and goals as of 2 June 2026 ‡ National team caps and goals as of 14 October 2020 (UTC)

Georgi Ilkov Terziev (Bulgarian: Георги Илков Терзиев; born on 18 April 1992) is a Bulgarian professional footballer currently playing as a defender for Ludogorets Razgrad.

== Career ==
=== Early career ===
Terziev started his football career in his home town at Sliven. He later moved to Naftex Burgas's youth system. Terziev eventually made his debut for the senior squad, aged 15, in a match against Haskovo on 8 March 2008. He ended the season with a total of nine appearances. In April 2008, he went on a trial at English club Newcastle United. He played with their youth team during the trial, eventually failing to impress.

=== Chernomorets Burgas ===
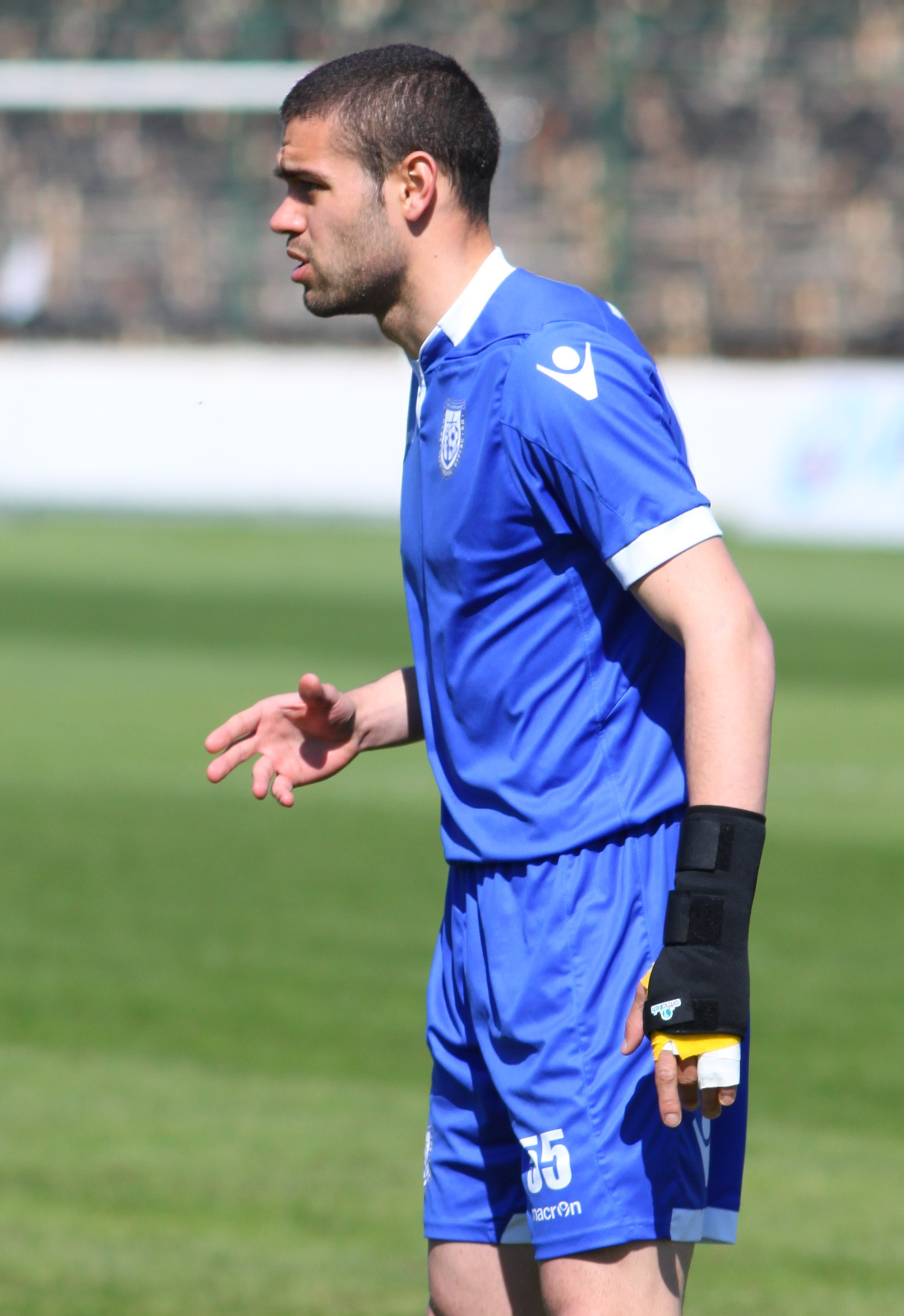
Terziev with Chernomorets in 2012

In July 2009, Terziev signed a five-year deal with city rivals Chernomorets Burgas, as Naftex Burgas experienced financial troubles. On 29 August, he made his debut in a 3–0 win against Sportist Svoge.

=== Ludogorets Razgrad ===
On 12 August 2013, Terziev signed with Ludogorets Razgrad on a four-year deal for a reported fee of €500,000. He was given the number 55 jersey.

Terziev made his debut in a 4–0 home win against Slavia Sofia on 2 November, coming on as an 82nd-minute substitute for Cosmin Moți. On 14 November, he made his first start in a 2–1 Bulgarian Cup win over Beroe Stara Zagora, playing full 90 minutes in the centre of defence. Terziev then made his full A Group debut for Ludogorets on 1 December, partnering Alexandre Barthe for the full 90 minutes in a 1–0 away win against Beroe. On 12 December, he made his Europa League debut, playing the full 90 minutes in a 2–1 win over Dinamo Zagreb at Maksimir.

Terziev scored his first goal in the Champions League group phase on 26 November 2014, grabbing a 2–2 equalizer against Liverpool in the 88th minute, in an eventual 2–2 draw.

On 12 February 2016 he extended his contract with Ludogorets until 2019, after his contract was to end in the summer of 2016.

On 15 February 2017, Terziev was loaned to Croatian club Hajduk Split until the end of the season.

== International career ==
On 7 October 2011, Terziev earned his first cap for Bulgaria in the 0–3 away loss against Ukraine in an exhibition match.

== Career statistics ==
=== Clubs ===
As of match played 2 June 2026

Club	Division	Season	League		Cup		Europe		Total	
Club	Division	Season	Apps	Goals	Apps	Goals	Apps	Goals	Apps	Goals
Naftex Burgas	B Group	2007–08	9	0	0	0	0	0	9	0
Naftex Burgas	B Group	2008–09	0	0	0	0	0	0	0	0
Naftex Burgas	B Group	Total	9	0	0	0	0	0	9	0
Chernomorets Burgas	A Group	2009–10	13	0	1	0	0	0	14	0
Chernomorets Burgas	A Group	2010–11	10	0	2	1	0	0	12	1
Chernomorets Burgas	A Group	2011–12	21	1	0	0	0	0	21	1
Chernomorets Burgas	A Group	2012–13	26	0	3	2	0	0	29	2
Chernomorets Burgas	A Group	2013–14	3	0	0	0	0	0	3	0
Chernomorets Burgas	A Group	Total	73	1	6	3	0	0	79	4
Ludogorets Razgrad	A Group	2013–14	12	0	5	0	3	0	20	0
Ludogorets Razgrad	A Group	2014–15	12	0	2	0	6	1	20	1
Ludogorets Razgrad	A Group	2015–16	22	1	2	0	0	0	24	1
Ludogorets Razgrad	A Group	2016–17	3	0	2	1	0	0	5	1
Ludogorets Razgrad	A Group	2017–18	19	0	2	0	5	0	26	0
Ludogorets Razgrad	A Group	2018–19	14	0	2	1	5	0	21	1
Ludogorets Razgrad	A Group	2019–20	24	0	3	0	9	1	36	1
Ludogorets Razgrad	A Group	2020–21	15	0	4	0	4	0	23	0
Ludogorets Razgrad	A Group	2021–22	14	0	3	0	1	0	18	0
Ludogorets Razgrad	A Group	2022–23	10	1	3	0	2	0	15	1
Ludogorets Razgrad	A Group	2023–24	13	1	3	0	1	0	17	1
Ludogorets Razgrad	A Group	2024–25	2	0	3	0	1	0	6	0
Ludogorets Razgrad	A Group	2025–26	2	0	0	0	0	0	2	0
Ludogorets Razgrad	Total		162	3	34	2	37	2	233	7
Hajduk Split	1. HNL	2016–17	8	0	0	0	—		8	0
Hajduk Split	Total		8	0	0	0	0	0	8	0
Total	Bulgaria		252	4	40	5	37	2	329	11

== Honours ==
=== Club ===
Ludogorets

- Bulgarian First League (12): 2013–14, 2014–15, 2015–16, 2016–17, 2017–18, 2018–19, 2019–20, 2020–21, 2021–22, 2022–23, 2023–24, 2024–25
- Bulgarian Cup (3): 2013–14, 2022–23, 2024–25
- Bulgarian Supercup (6): 2018, 2019, 2021, 2022, 2023, 2024
