= Dimo Bakalov =

Bulgarian footballer

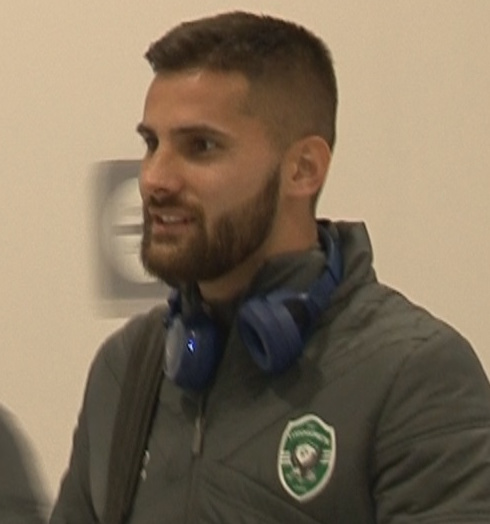

Personal information
- Full name: Dimo Naydenov Bakalov
- Date of birth: 19 December 1988 (age 37)
- Place of birth: Sliven, Bulgaria
- Height: 1.77 m (5 ft 10 in)
- Position: Winger

Team information
- Current team: Krumovgrad
- Number: 10

Senior career*
Years	Team	Apps	(Gls)
2006–2011	Sliven	84	(7)
2011–2014	Ludogorets	42	(6)
2014–2015	Beroe	13	(2)
2015–2018	Lokomotiv Plovdiv	80	(16)
2018–2020	Ludogorets	31	(3)
2020–2021	Beroe	15	(0)
2021–2022	Tsarsko Selo	12	(1)
2022–2023	Lokomotiv Sofia	31	(3)
2023	Etar	16	(0)
2024	Maritsa Plovdiv	6	(2)
2024–2025	Chernomorets Burgas	33	(16)
2025–2026	Spartak Plovdiv	13	(2)
2026–	Krumovgrad	11	(5)
- * Club domestic league appearances and goals as of 30 October 2026

Dimo Naydenov Bakalov (Bulgarian: Димо Найденов Бакалов; born 19 December 1988) is a Bulgarian professional footballer who plays as a winger for Krumovgrad.

== Career ==
In 2006 the Youth Academy midfielder Dimo Bakalov agreed the conditions of his first professional contract with Sliven 2000, which was to be effective for three years.

In June 2014, Bakalov moved from Ludogorets Razgrad to Beroe Stara Zagora. He returned to Ludogorets in the summer of 2018. In July 2020, Bakalov once again signed with Beroe Stara Zagora.

== Club statistics ==
As of 24 July 2020

Club	Season	League		Cup		Europe		Total	
Club	Season	Apps	Goals	Apps	Goals	Apps	Goals	Apps	Goals
Sliven 2000	2006–07	13	0	1	0	-	-	14	0
Sliven 2000	2007–08	23	2	2	0	-	-	25	2
Sliven 2000	2008–09	14	0	1	0	-	-	15	0
Sliven 2000	2009–10	12	1	1	0	-	-	13	1
Sliven 2000	2010–11	22	4	0	0	-	-	22	4
Sliven 2000	Total	84	7	5	0	-	-	89	7
Ludogorets	2011–12	14	2	3	0	-	-	17	2
Ludogorets	2012–13	15	4	0	0	1	0	16	4
Ludogorets	2013–14	7	0	1	0	2	0	10	0
Ludogorets	Total	36	6	4	0	3	0	43	6
Beroe	2014–15	13	2	1	0	-	-	14	2
Beroe	Total	13	2	1	0	0	0	14	2
Lokomotiv Plovdiv	2015–16	17	2	2	0	-	-	19	2
Lokomotiv Plovdiv	2016–17	33	5	3	0	-	-	36	5
Lokomotiv Plovdiv	2017–18	30	9	2	1	-	-	32	10
Lokomotiv Plovdiv	Total	80	16	7	1	0	0	87	17
Ludogorets	2018–19	14	2	2	0	4	0	20	2
Ludogorets	2019–20	18	1	3	0	0	0	21	1
Ludogorets	Total	32	3	5	0	4	0	41	3
Career totals		245	34	22	1	7	0	274	35

== Honours ==
=== Club ===
Ludogorets

- A Group (5): 2011–12, 2012–13, 2013–14, 2018–19, 2019–20
- Bulgarian Cup (2): 2011–12, 2013–14
- Bulgarian Supercup (2): 2012, 2019
