= Jody Lukoki =

Congolese-Dutch footballer (1992–2022)

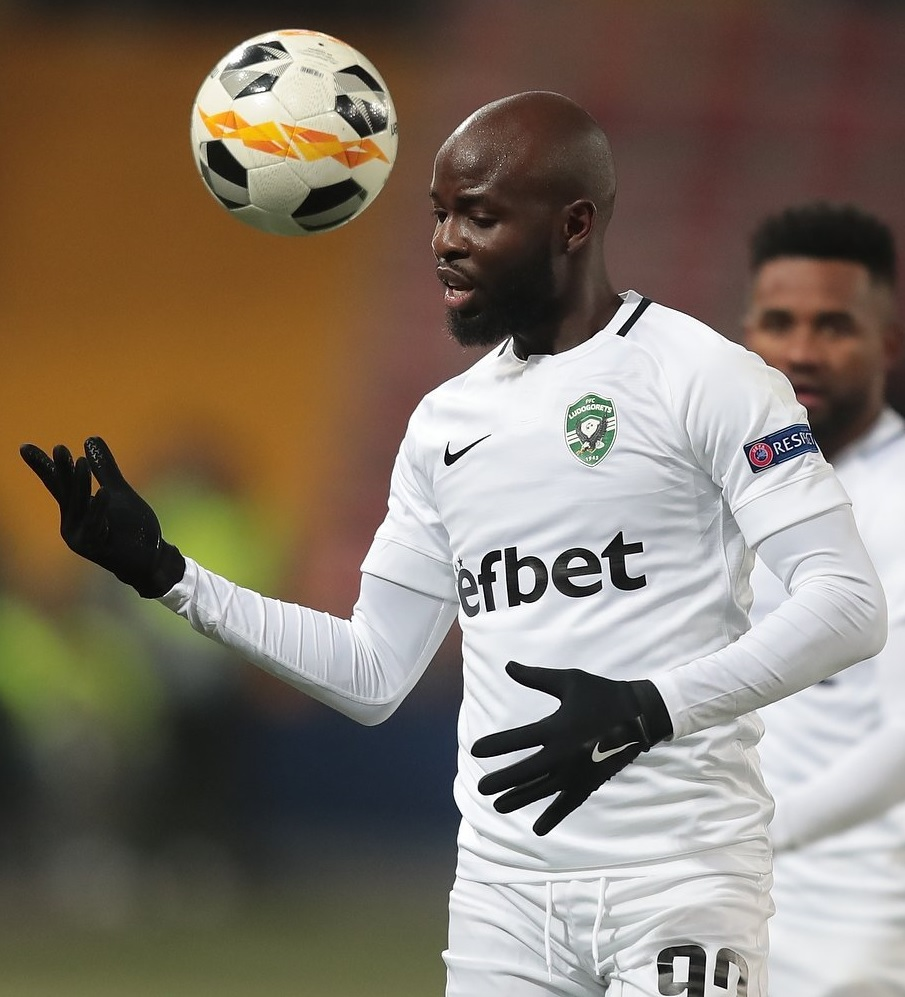
- Lukoki with Ludogorets Razgrad in 2019

Personal information
- Date of birth: 15 November 1992
- Place of birth: Kindu, Zaire
- Date of death: 9 May 2022 (aged 29)
- Place of death: Almere, Netherlands
- Height: 1.73 m (5 ft 8 in)
- Position: Winger

Youth career
- 2002: VVA/Spartaan
- 2002–2003: Young Boys Haarlem
- 2003–2011: Ajax

Senior career*
Years	Team	Apps	(Gls)
2011–2014	Ajax	24	(5)
2013–2014	→ SC Cambuur (loan)	32	(2)
2014–2015	PEC Zwolle	33	(2)
2015–2020	Ludogorets Razgrad II	6	(0)
2015–2020	Ludogorets Razgrad	102	(17)
2020–2021	Yeni Malatyaspor	10	(0)
2021–2022	Twente	0	(0)
Total		207	(26)

International career
2010–2011	Netherlands U19	11	(2)
2012–2013	Netherlands U20	8	(0)
2013	Netherlands U21	1	(0)
2015–2020	DR Congo	3	(0)
- * Club domestic league appearances and goals

Jody Lukoki (15 November 1992 – 9 May 2022) was a Congolese-Dutch professional footballer who played as a winger for various clubs and the DR Congo national team.

Lukoki progressed through the famed Ajax youth academy, making his professional debut in 2011 against rivals Feyenoord. After failing to make his definitive breakthrough he was sent on loan to Cambuur, before joining PEC Zwolle on a permanent deal in 2014. He moved abroad after one season, signing with Bulgarian club Ludogorets Razgrad where he enjoyed considerable success. Short spells followed with Yeni Malatyaspor and Twente.

A Netherlands youth international, he was capped at the U19, U20 and U21 levels. He received his first call-up for DR Congo in 2015, and represented the country on three occasions.

On 9 May 2022, Lukoki died at the age of 29 of a cardiac arrest at a hospital in Almere, after an argument with his family had turned violent. Months earlier, he had been convicted of domestic violence after which Twente terminated his contract.

== Club career ==
=== Early life and career ===
Lukoki was born in Zaire but immigrated to the Netherlands with his parents and his twin brother, NAC Breda player Madjer Lukoki at a young age due to the First Congo War. Growing up in Amsterdam, he joined the local club VVA/Spartaan at the age of ten.

=== Ajax ===
After playing for VVA/Spartaan and Young Boys Haarlem, Lukoki joined the youth ranks of Ajax. He made his debut for the first team in the 2–0 home win against rivals Feyenoord on 19 January 2011, replacing Lorenzo Ebecilio in the 80th minute. He immediately got the home fans on his side by giving Tim de Cler a nutmeg when the ball was already out of play. He would go on to make his second appearance in the 3–2 away loss against rivals ADO Den Haag on 20 March 2011. The 2011–12 season started with Lukoki scoring his first career Eredivisie goal in his season debut against Roda JC.

==== SC Cambuur (loan) ====
Having contributed to three national titles in his first three seasons with Ajax, Lukoki would remain third-choice winger under Frank de Boer and was granted permission to explore other options. On 2 August 2013, he was loaned out to newly promoted SC Cambuur for the season.

=== PEC Zwolle ===
On 7 August 2014, it was announced that Lukoki would transfer to PEC Zwolle on a three-year contract for a reported €1.5 million, joining the team that had recently defeated Ajax in the KNVB Cup final as well as the Johan Cruijff Shield. On 21 August 2014, Lukoki scored PEC Zwolle's first-ever goal in a continental competition, when they faced Sparta Prague in the 2014–15 UEFA Europa League play-off round. The match ended in a 1–1 draw, with Lukoki scoring in the 77th minute in the club's European debut.

=== Ludogorets ===
On 26 June 2015, Lukoki signed with the Bulgarian side Ludogorets Razgrad. The Congolese scored three goals in the 2016–17 UEFA Champions League second qualifying round matches against Mladost Podgorica. He scored his first goal in the league on 26 November 2016 in match against Botev Plovdiv. During his time at Ludogorets Razgrad he was nicknamed "Синът на вятъра" (English: "The Son of the Wind"). On 28 September 2017, Lukoki netted the winning goal in the 2–1 victory over 1899 Hoffenheim in a UEFA Europa League group stage match. On 1 April 2020, Ludogorets Razgrad announced that they had mutually agreed to terminate Lukoki's contract, allowing him to return to the Netherlands.

=== Later career ===
In July 2020, Lukoki signed a two-year contract with Turkish club Yeni Malatyaspor. He made his competitive debut on 18 September in a 1–1 league draw against Göztepe. His contract was terminated by mutual consent on 26 April 2021, after his twelfth appearance for the club.

Lukoki returned to the Netherlands, joining Eredivisie club Twente on a two-year contract in June 2021. A few days after signing, he suffered a serious knee injury during practice, which sidelined him for a season. Twente released Lukoki on 17 February 2022, shortly after he was convicted of domestic violence.

== International career ==
Lukoki held dual citizenship and was eligible to represent either Netherlands or DR Congo at senior level. He represented Netherlands at various youth levels, reaching third place with the U-19 team at the Festival International 'Espoirs' 2012 in Toulon, France. On 19 March 2015, Lukoki received his first call for the DR Congo team for the match against Iraq and earned his first cap in that game.

== Personal life ==
=== Domestic violence conviction ===
In January 2022, Lukoki was convicted of domestic violence, receiving a two-week suspended sentence with a probationary period of three years. He was also ordered to perform 80 hours of community service.

=== Death ===
On 9 May 2022, Lukoki died at the age of 29 of a cardiac arrest at a hospital in Almere, after being beaten by his family in an argument.

== Career statistics ==
=== Club ===
Appearances and goals by club, season and competition
Club	Season	League			Cup		Continental (Note: Appearances in UEFA Champions League and UEFA Europa League)		Other		Total	
Club	Season	Division	Apps	Goals	Apps	Goals	Apps	Goals	Apps	Goals	Apps	Goals
Ajax	2010–11	Eredivisie	2	0	0	0	1	0	0	0	3	0
Ajax	2011–12	Eredivisie	6	2	3	0	4	0	0	0	13	2
Ajax	2012–13	Eredivisie	16	3	3	0	4	0	0	0	23	3
Ajax	Total		24	5	6	0	9	0	0	0	39	5
Cambuur (loan)	2013–14	Eredivisie	32	2	2	0	0	0	—		34	2
PEC Zwolle	2014–15	Eredivisie	33	2	5	1	2	1	—		40	4
Ludogorets Razgrad II	2015–16	Second League	4	0	—		—		—		4	0
Ludogorets Razgrad	2015–16	A Group	20	0	2	0	1	0	0	0	23	0
Ludogorets Razgrad	2016–17	First League	15	1	4	0	7	3	0	0	26	4
Ludogorets Razgrad	2017–18	First League	28	7	2	0	11	1	0	0	41	8
Ludogorets Razgrad	2018–19	First League	28	6	3	1	11	1	1 (Note: Appearances in Bulgarian Supercup)	0	43	8
Ludogorets Razgrad	2019–20	First League	11	3	1	1	11	5	1	1	24	10
Ludogorets Razgrad	Total		102	17	12	2	41	10	2	1	157	30
Career total			195	26	25	3	42	11	2	1	274	41

=== International ===
Appearances and goals by national team and year
National team	Year	Apps	Goals
DR Congo	2015	2	0
DR Congo	2019	1	0
Total		3	0

== Honours ==
Ajax

- Eredivisie: 2010–11, 2011–12, 2012–13

Ludogorets Razgrad

- Bulgarian First League: 2015–16, 2016–17, 2017–18, 2018–19
- Bulgarian Supercup: 2018, 2019
