= Plamen Iliev (footballer, born 1991) =

Bulgarian footballer

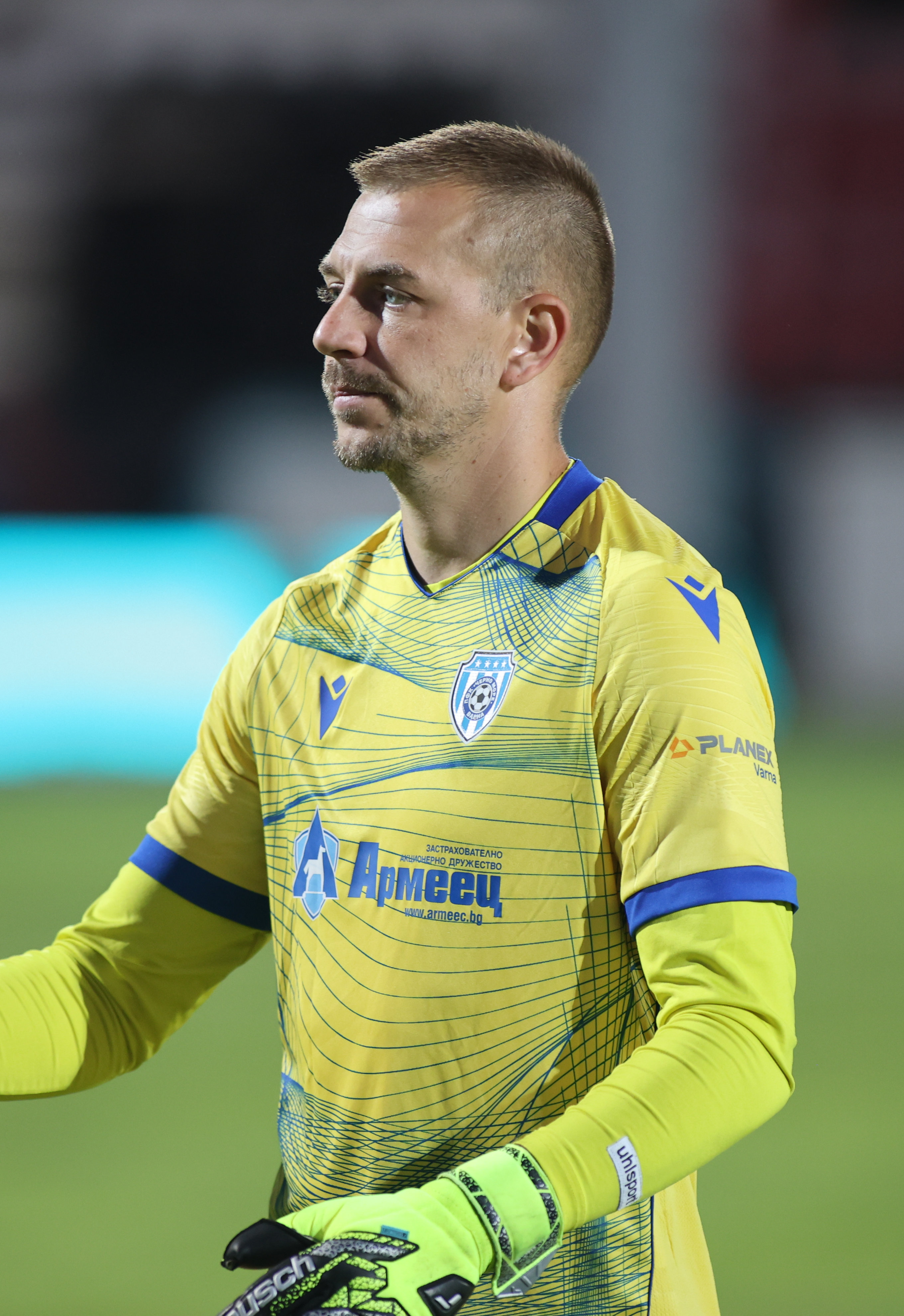

Personal information
- Full name: Plamen Ivanov Iliev
- Date of birth: 30 November 1991 (age 34)
- Place of birth: Botevgrad, Bulgaria
- Height: 1.82 m (6 ft 0 in)
- Position: Goalkeeper

Team information
- Current team: Spartak Varna
- Number: 23

Youth career
- 2000–2006: Balkan Botevgrad
- 2006–2009: Vidima-Rakovski

Senior career*
Years	Team	Apps	(Gls)
2009–2010	Vidima-Rakovski	35	(0)
2011–2015	Levski Sofia	104	(0)
2015–2017	Botoșani	44	(0)
2017–2019	Astra Giurgiu	49	(0)
2019–2021	Ludogorets Razgrad	37	(0)
2021–2022	Dinamo București	10	(0)
2022	Hermannstadt	15	(0)
2022–2024	Universitatea Cluj	25	(0)
2024–2026	Cherno More	52	(0)
2026–	Spartak Varna	0	(0)

International career^{‡}
2010–2012	Bulgaria U21	9	(0)
2012–	Bulgaria	21	(0)
- * Club domestic league appearances and goals as of 18 March 2026 ‡ National team caps and goals as of 23 March 2025

Plamen Ivanov Iliev (Bulgarian: Пламен Иванов Илиев; born 30 November 1991) is a Bulgarian professional footballer who plays as a goalkeeper for First League club Spartak Varna.

Iliev spent his early years with his hometown club Balkan Botevgrad, before joining Vidima-Rakovski's youth academy in 2006. He made his professional debut in 2009 at the age of 17 and quickly became a regular starter. In December 2010, Iliev moved to Levski Sofia for an undisclosed fee. Four and a half years later he signed for Romanian club Botoșani. In February 2017, he moved to Astra Giurgiu where he stayed two years before he returned to Bulgaria to join up with Ludogorets Razgrad.

A former regular for Bulgaria at Under-21 level, Iliev made his senior international debut in May 2012.

== Club career ==
=== Vidima-Rakovski ===
In his youth years in Botevgrad, Iliev started to play football at Balkan. He joined Vidima-Rakovski when he was fourteen years old and signed his first professional contract in 2009.

At the beginning of the 2009–10 season, Iliev was added to Vidima's senior squad by manager Dimitar Todorov. He made his B Group debut in the starting line-up on 8 August 2009 in a 1–1 draw against Kom-Minyor. During the season he became first choice goalkeeper and earned 23 appearances, helping his team to win promotion to the A Group. Iliev was also the first choice keeper for the team from Sevlievo in the first half of the 2010–11 season and earned praise for his performances.

=== Levski Sofia ===
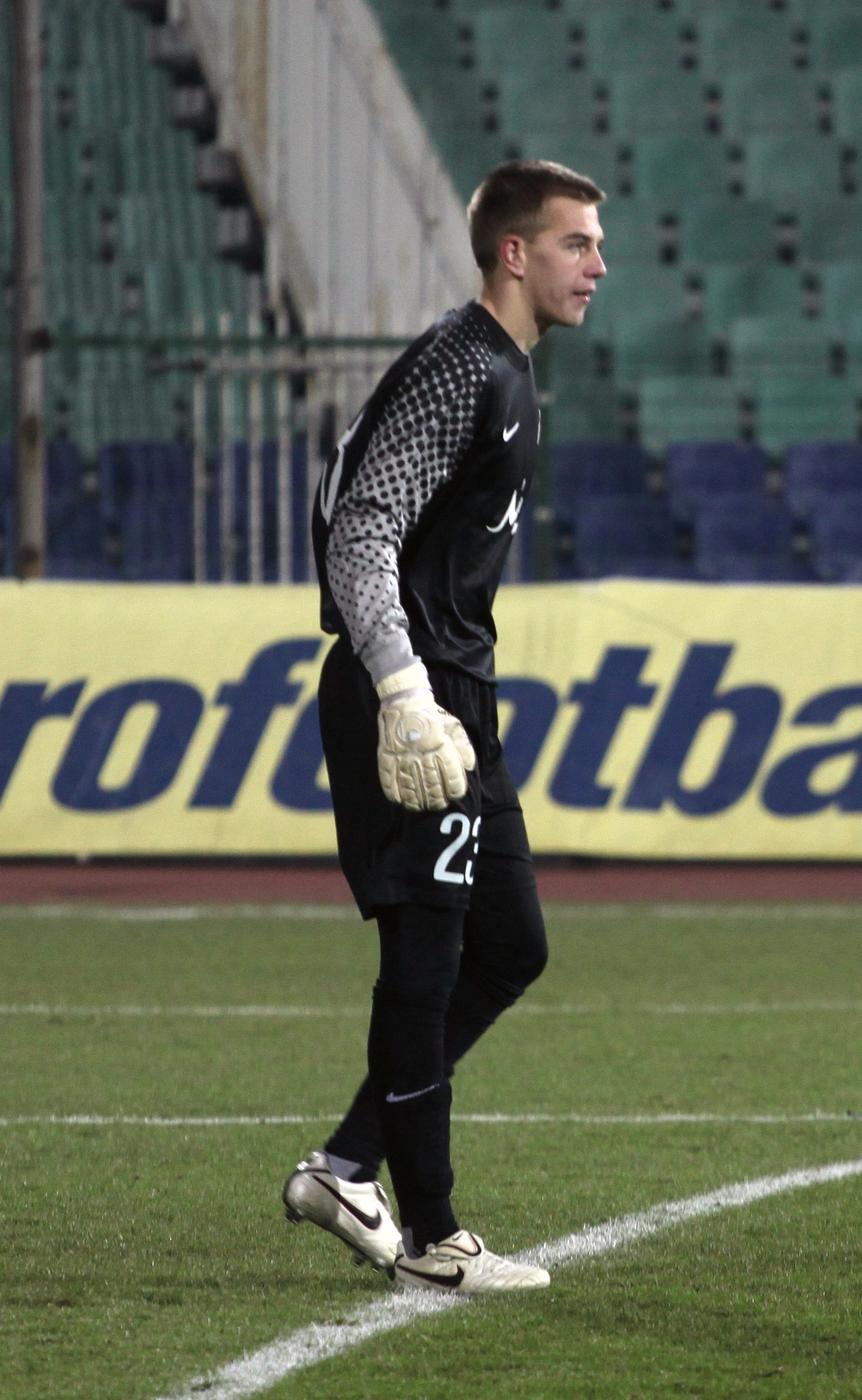
Iliev playing for Levski Sofia in 2011

On 17 December 2010, Iliev was sold to Levski Sofia. He made his debut for Levski against Lokomotiv Sofia on 6 March 2011, with Iliev succeeding in keeping a clean sheet. On 6 April 2012, Iliev was appointed as Levski's captain, but became vice-captain for the 2012–13 season, as new coach Ilian Iliev decided to give the captain's armband to Stanislav Angelov.

On 14 September 2012, Iliev signed a new contract keeping him at the club until 2016.

=== Botoșani ===
On 5 June 2015, Iliev moved abroad for the first time, agreeing to a three-year deal with Romanian Liga I club FC Botoșani.

=== Astra Giurgiu ===
Following his good display at Botoșani, Iliev was signed by defending champions Astra Giurgiu on 1 February 2017.

He kept a clean sheet in his competitive debut against Politehnica Iași, with Astra conceding two goals before his substitution. On 3 April, Iliev saved two penalties in six minutes, but in an eventual 1–2 home loss to Viitorul Constanța.

After the departure of Silviu Lung Jr. to Kayserispor in the summer of 2017, Iliev became the starting goalkeeper for Astra.

=== Ludogorets Razgrad ===
On 7 January 2019, Ludogorets Razgrad confirmed that Iliev had signed a preliminary contract under the Bosman ruling and is set to join the team as a free agent in June 2019 if the negotiations between Astra and Ludogorets in January didn't end with a transfer agreement, but on 12 January the teams reached an agreement and Iliev joined the team for an undisclosed fee.

=== Dinamo București ===
After being released from Ludogorets, Iliev returned to Romania, signing a contract with local giants Dinamo București.

=== Cherno More Varna ===
In June 2024, he made a return to his country, joining Cherno More.

== International career ==
Since 2010 Iliev has been a regular with the Bulgaria U21 side, gradually becoming first choice, taking over from Stefano Kunchev. On 11 October 2011, he was sent off in the last minute of Bulgaria's 3–2 win against Luxembourg U21 in a 2013 UEFA European Under-21 Football Championship qualifier after an altercation with Tom Laterza. Iliev was subsequently banned for 3 matches.

Iliev received his first call-up to the senior team of his country in 2011 and made his debut on 29 May 2012, in the 0–2 loss against Turkey in a friendly match after replacing Stoyan Kolev in the 76th minute. Iliev appeared as a starter for the first time in the 2–1 win over Kazakhstan in another exhibition match held on 4 June 2013, managing to keep a clean sheet, with Bulgaria conceding after his replacement.

On 31 August 2017, he saved a penalty taken by Emil Forsberg and the subsequent shot from the rebound in the 16th minute of the game in a historical 3–2 home win against Sweden. Iliev established himself as the first choice goalkeeper during Petar Hubchev's tenure as manager.

== Personal life ==
Iliev has two children with his wife Anna - daughter Isabella and son Vladi.

== Career statistics ==
=== Club ===
As of 18 March 2026

Appearances and goals by club, season and competition
Club	Season	League		Cup		Continental		Total	
Club	Season	Apps	Goals	Apps	Goals	Apps	Goals	Apps	Goals
Vidima-Rakovski	2009–10	23	0	0	0	–		23	0
Vidima-Rakovski	2010–11	12	0	1	0	–		13	0
Vidima-Rakovski	Total	35	0	1	0	0	0	36	0
Levski Sofia	2010–11	13	0	1	0	0	0	14	0
Levski Sofia	2011–12	30	0	2	0	2	0	34	0
Levski Sofia	2012–13	26	0	5	0	2	0	33	0
Levski Sofia	2013–14	18	0	3	0	2	0	23	0
Levski Sofia	2014–15	17	0	2	0	–		19	0
Levski Sofia	Total	104	0	13	0	6	0	123	0
Botoșani	2015–16	24	0	0	0	4	0	28	0
Botoșani	2016–17	20	0	0	0	–		20	0
Botoșani	Total	44	0	0	0	4	0	48	0
Astra Giurgiu	2016–17	8	0	3	0	0	0	11	0
Astra Giurgiu	2017–18	33	0	2	0	4	0	39	0
Astra Giurgiu	2018–19	8	0	0	0	–		8	0
Astra Giurgiu	Total	49	0	5	0	4	0	58	0
Ludogorets Razgrad	2018–19	12	0	0	0	–		12	0
Ludogorets Razgrad	2019–20	16	0	2 (Note: Includes Bulgarian Cup, Bulgarian Supercup.)	0	13	0	31	0
Ludogorets Razgrad	2020–21	9	0	1	0	6	0	16	0
Ludogorets Razgrad	2021–22	0	0	0	0	0	0	0	0
Ludogorets Razgrad	Total	37	0	3	0	19	0	59	0
Dinamo București	2021–22	10	0	0	0	–		10	0
Hermannstadt	2021–22	10	0	–		–		10	0
Hermannstadt	2022–23	5	0	–		–		5	0
Hermannstadt	Total	15	0	–		–		15	0
Universitatea Cluj	2022–23	11	0	2	0	–		13	0
Universitatea Cluj	2023–24	14	0	3	0	–		17	0
Universitatea Cluj	Total	25	0	5	0	0	0	30	0
Cherno More	2024–25	36	0	4	0	2	0	42	0
Cherno More	2025–26	16	0	0	0	2	0	18	0
Cherno More	Total	52	0	4	0	4	0	60	0
Career total		371	0	31	0	37	0	439	0

=== International ===
As of 23 March 2025

Appearances and goals by national team and year
National team	Year	Apps	Goals
Bulgaria	2012	1	0
Bulgaria	2013	1	0
Bulgaria	2014	0	0
Bulgaria	2015	0	0
Bulgaria	2016	0	0
Bulgaria	2017	5	0
Bulgaria	2018	6	0
Bulgaria	2019	3	0
Bulgaria	2020	1	0
Bulgaria	2021	2	0
Bulgaria	2025	2	0
Total		21	0

== Honours ==
Vidima-Rakovski

- B Group: 2012–13

Levski Sofia

- Bulgarian Cup runner-up: 2012–13, 2014–15

Astra Giurgiu

- Cupa României runner-up: 2016–17

Ludogorets Razgrad

- First Professional Football League: 2018–19, 2019–20, 2020–21
- Bulgarian Supercup: 2019, 2021

Universitatea Cluj

- Cupa României runner-up: 2022–23

Individual

- Best goalkeeper in the Bulgarian First League: 2019
