= 2019 Bulgarian Supercup =

Финал за Суперкупата на България 2019
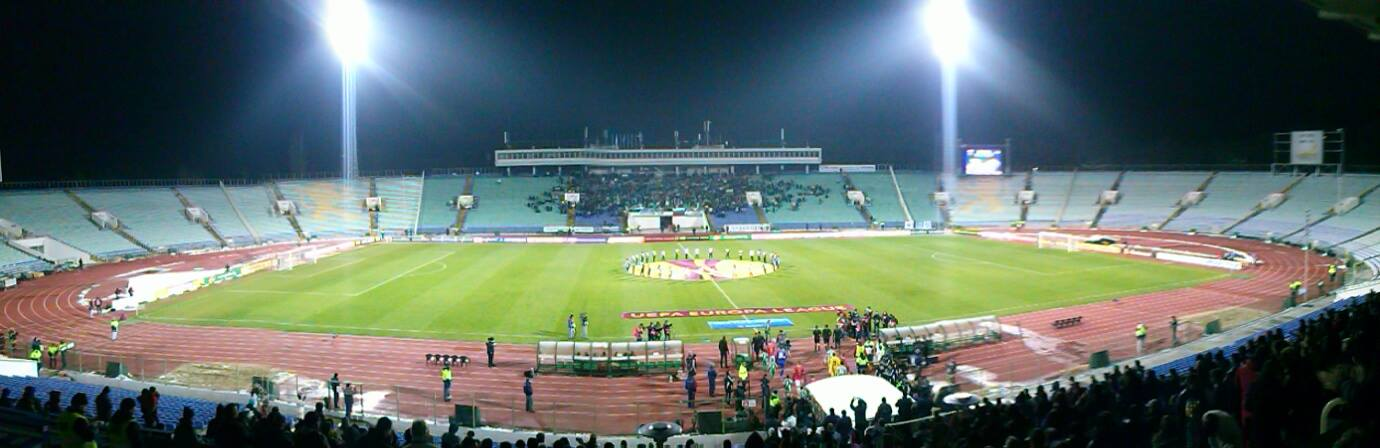
Ludogorets	Lokomotiv Plovdiv
First League	Bulgarian Cup
2	0
- Date: 3 July 2019
- Venue: Vasil Levski National Stadium, Sofia
- Referee: Ivaylo Stoyanov (Petrich)
- Attendance: 3,800

The 2019 Bulgarian Supercup was the 16th Bulgarian Supercup, an annual Bulgarian football match played between the winners of the previous season's First Professional Football League and Bulgarian Cup. The game was played between the champions of the 2018–19 First League, Ludogorets Razgrad, and the 2019 Bulgarian Cup winners, Lokomotiv Plovdiv.

This was Ludogorets's seventh Bulgarian Supercup appearance and Lokomotiv Plovdiv's third. The two teams played each other in the 2012 Bulgarian Supercup, with Ludogorets winning 3−1.

Ludogorets won the Supercup for a 4th time after a 2–0 win over Lokomotiv Plovdiv. The goals were scored by Mavis Tchibota and Jody Lukoki.

== Match details ==
3 July 2019
20:30 EEST

Ludogorets Razgrad	2−0	Lokomotiv Plovdiv
Tchibota 3'; Lukoki 90+3'	Report

Vasil Levski National Stadium, Sofia
Attendance: 3,800
Referee: Ivaylo Stoyanov (Petrich)

Ludogorets	Lokomotiv

GK	23	(Bulgaria) Plamen Iliev
RB	22	(Democratic Republic of the Congo) Jordan Ikoko
CB	21	(Romania) Dragoș Grigore	(yellow card) 76'
CB	3	(Bulgaria) Anton Nedyalkov		(substituted off) 46'
LB	4	(Brazil) Cicinho	(yellow card) 89'
CM	44	(Poland) Jacek Góralski	(yellow card) 7'
CM	18	(Bulgaria) Svetoslav Dyakov (c)
AM	84	(Bulgaria) Marcelinho		(substituted off) 83'
RW	92	(Democratic Republic of the Congo) Jody Lukoki	(yellow card) 68'
LW	13	(Republic of the Congo) Mavis Tchibota
CF	28	(Romania) Claudiu Keșerü		(substituted off) 61'
Substitutes:
GK	33	(Brazil) Renan
DF	5	(Bulgaria) Georgi Terziev
MF	7	(Bulgaria) Dimo Bakalov		(substituted on) 83'
MF	8	(Israel) Dan Biton		(substituted on) 61'
DF	11	(Bulgaria) Stanislav Manolev
MF	20	(Bulgaria) Serkan Yusein
DF	30	(Romania) Cosmin Moți		(substituted on) 46'
Manager:
(Bulgaria) Stoycho Stoev

GK	71	(Bulgaria) Martin Lukov
CB	20	(Serbia) Miloš Petrović
CB	6	(Nigeria) Stephen Eze	(yellow card) 11'
CB	50	(Croatia) Josip Tomašević	(yellow card) 48'
DM	34	(Bulgaria) Petar Vitanov
CM	91	(Bulgaria) Georgi Iliev		(substituted off) 75'
RM	7	(Bulgaria) Momchil Tsvetanov
LM	9	(Bulgaria) Bircent Karagaren
AM	10	(Tajikistan) Parvizdzhon Umarbayev	(yellow card) 44'	(substituted off) 74'
CF	14	(Bulgaria) Dimitar Iliev (c)
CF	77	(Croatia) Ante Aralica		(substituted off) 66'
Substitutes:
GK	1	(Bulgaria) Ilko Pirgov
FW	12	(Slovenia) Alen Ožbolt	(yellow card) 68'	(substituted on) 66'
MF	13	(Austria) Edin Bahtić		(substituted on) 75'
DF	15	(Bulgaria) Arhan Isuf
FW	19	(Bulgaria) Filip Kolev
MF	29	(Bulgaria) Oktay Yusein
MF	61	(Brazil) Eliton Junior		(substituted on) 74'
Manager:
(Bosnia and Herzegovina) Bruno Akrapović

MATCH OFFICIALS

- Assistant referees:
- Fourth official:

MATCH RULES

- 90 minutes.
- Penalty shoot-out if scores still level.
- Seven named substitutes, of which three may be used
