= 2020–21 First Professional Football League (Bulgaria) =

97th season of top-tier football league in Bulgaria

First Professional Football League
- Season: 2020–21
- Dates: 7 August 2020 – 30 May 2021
- Champions: Ludogorets (10th title)
- Relegated: Etar; Montana
- Europa Conference League: CSKA Sofia; Lokomotiv Plovdiv; Arda
- Matches: 223
- Goals: 536 (2.4 per match)
- Top goalscorer: Claudiu Keșerü (18 goals)
- Best goalkeeper: Daniel Naumov (12 clean sheets)
- Biggest home win: Beroe 6–0 Botev Vratsa (28 August 2020); Lokomotiv Plovdiv 6–0 Botev Plovdiv (28 November 2020); Ludogorets 6–0 Etar (15 February 2021); CSKA Sofia 6–0 Montana (21 April 2021)
- Biggest away win: Etar 0–4 Cherno More (16 August 2020); Montana 0–4 Levski Sofia (29 August 2020)
- Highest scoring: Montana 3–4 Tsarsko Selo (7 December 2020)
- Longest winning run: 8 matches CSKA Sofia
- Longest unbeaten run: 16 matches Ludogorets
- Longest winless run: 13 matches Etar
- Longest losing run: 8 matches Botev Vratsa

The 2020–21 First Professional Football League, also known as efbet League for sponsorship reasons, was the 97th season of the top division of the Bulgarian football league system, the 73rd since a league format was adopted for the national competition of A Group as a top tier of the pyramid, and also the 5th season of the First Professional Football League, which decides the Bulgarian champion. Ludogorets Razgrad were the defending champions for the ninth consecutive time.

The season was initially set to start on 24 July 2020, but began on 7 August 2020 due to the COVID-19 situation in Bulgaria.

On 4 May 2021, Ludogorets Razgrad became champions for a record-breaking 10th consecutive time after winning 3–1 against Beroe.

== Effects of the COVID-19 pandemic ==
=== Measures pertaining to fan attendance ===
All matches were at first envisioned to be held without spectators, at the minimum until 31 August, but this was reversed in early August (allowing for matches to be held at 50% stadium capacity and up to 1000 people per stand), reportedly under pressure from fan groups, with the government's inconsistency on the matter in turn criticized in certain circles. On 27 October 2020, Minister of Health Kostadin Angelov issued a decree valid from 29 October until 12 November, stipulating that all matches are to be held behind closed doors. Minister of Youth and Sports Krasen Kralev claimed that some of the fans of certain teams had not been observing the pandemic control protocols, such as social distancing and mask-wearing. On 12 November 2020, the ban on the presence of spectators was extended at least until 30 November. In late November 2020 Kralev stated that the return of fans will not be under consideration until March 2021. Spectators were once again allowed from 24 April 2021 onwards, at 30% stadium capacity, with a maximum of 1000 people per block. The capacity was expanded to 50% from 19 May 2021.

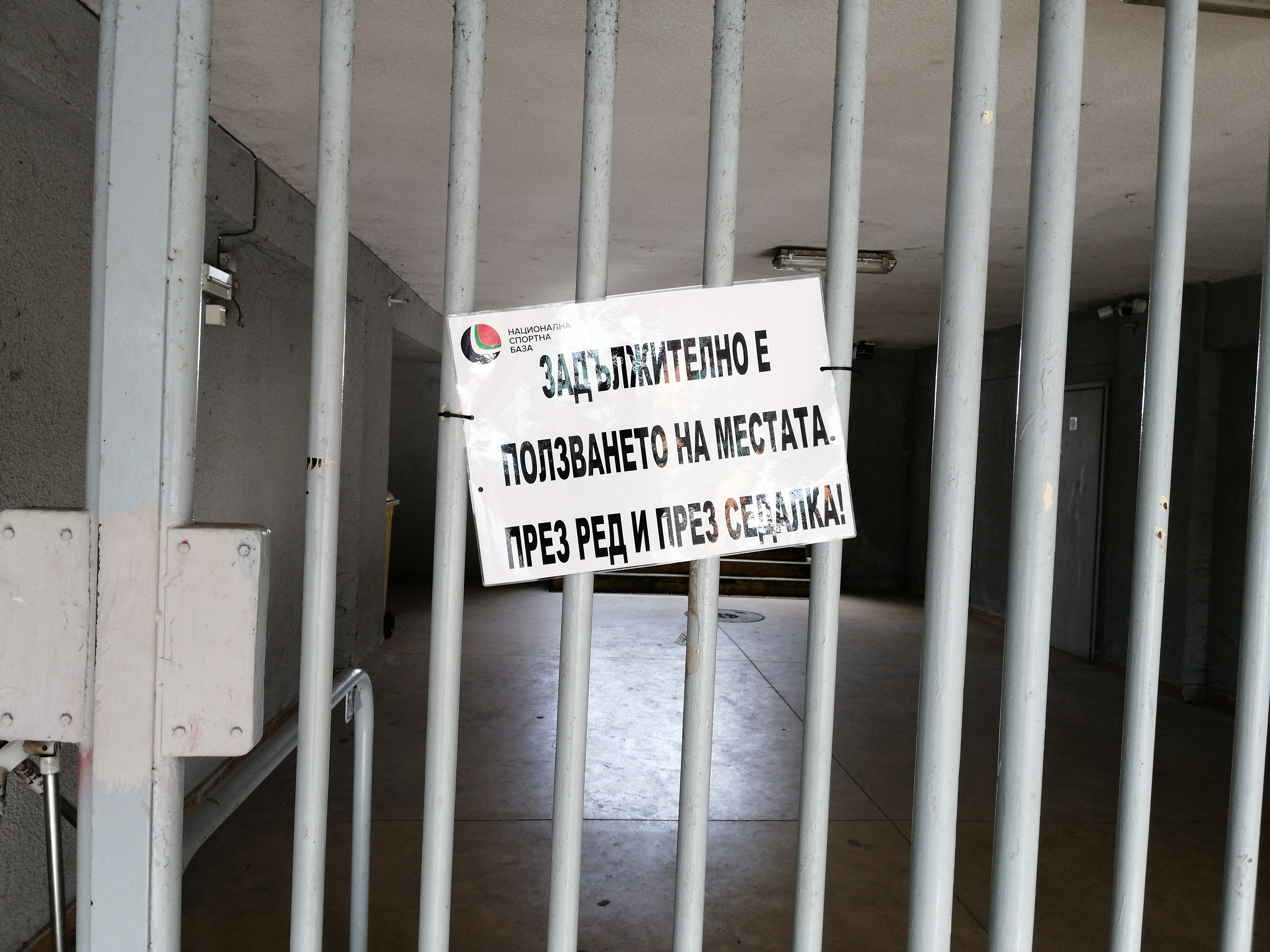
A sign at the Vasil Levski National Stadium urging fans to be mindful of the need for social distancing

=== Footballers testing positive for the virus, schedule changes and vaccinations ===
Two Ludogorets Razgrad players tested positive for coronavirus just prior to the beginning of the championship. In September 2020, the whole Etar team was initially quarantined by the regional health authorities in Veliko Tarnovo after 5 footballers' and 2 staff members' PCR tests indicated that they were infected, but the match against Lokomotiv eventually went ahead without the date being changed. The fixture between Arda and Ludogorets Razgrad that was to be held on 4 October 2020 was postponed after more than 10 footballers' tests from the Kardzhali team (as well as a trainer) returned positive results. In late October 2020, Slavia also saw multiple footballers testing positive for COVID-19. In early November 2020, four Levski Sofia players were reported to have the infection. Prior to the start of the November international window, 12 Ludogorets footballers from both the first and the second teams as well as additional Levski Sofia players from the senior and junior rosters were diagnosed with the virus, bringing the total number of infected at the latter club to 16. This caused some of the players to miss out on national team call-ups and led to the postponement of Ludogorets' Bulgarian Cup match against Sportist Svoge and Levski Sofia's league game against Lokomotiv Plovdiv. Beroe also saw cases of coronavirus among its players. After initially given the green light to be held on the planned date, The Eternal Derby match originally scheduled for 21 November was eventually postponed as well, taking place on 18 December. After reporting a number of COVID-19 cases in July 2020, shortly before the beginning of the championship, CSKA 1948 saw a boom in infections in May 2021, with 11 footballers testing positive, resulting in the postponement of their first game from the championship group against Lokomotiv Plovdiv. CSKA 1948 requested that their match against CSKA Sofia (scheduled to be held on 7 May) is moved to a later date as well, but this was not granted by the Football Union. After CSKA 1948 did not show up for the game, on 10 May CSKA Sofia were awarded a 3:0 technical win by the Sports and Technical Commission. However, on 13 May 2021, the same technical body decided to honour CSKA 1948's appeal, also taking into account the dissatisfaction voiced by Lokomotiv Plovdiv due to competing with CSKA Sofia for the second place in the league standings, and rescheduled the game for 22 May 2021. Vaccinations among footballers and staff began in March 2021.

== Innovations ==
The VAR system was introduced at the start of the post-regular season phase, being first used on 3 May 2021 for the match between CSKA Sofia and Arda.

== Teams ==
Fourteen teams are competing in the league – the top eleven teams from the previous season, the team that finished in first place in the Second League, and the two winners of the promotion/relegation playoffs.

CSKA 1948 were promoted as champions of the 2019–20 Second League and will make their debut in the top tier of Bulgarian football. The second team to be promoted was Montana, who earned promotion after winning their play-off match against Dunav Ruse. The club returns after three seasons in the second tier, following their relegation in the 2016–17 season, while Dunav ended their four-year stay in the First League. In the third playoff, Tsarsko Selo remained in the top division by winning against Septemvri Sofia.

=== Stadiums and locations ===
Arda	Beroe	Botev Plovdiv	Botev Vratsa
Arena Arda	Beroe	Futbolen kompleks Botev 1912	Hristo Botev
Capacity: 11,114	Capacity: 12,128	Capacity: 4,000	Capacity: 12,000
Cherno More	2020–21 First Professional Football League (Bulgaria) (Bulgaria) Location of Sofia teams.		CSKA Sofia
Ticha	2020–21 First Professional Football League (Bulgaria) (Bulgaria) Location of Sofia teams.		Balgarska Armia
Capacity: 8,250	2020–21 First Professional Football League (Bulgaria) (Bulgaria) Location of Sofia teams.		Capacity: 22,995
CSKA 1948	2020–21 First Professional Football League (Bulgaria) (Bulgaria) Location of Sofia teams.		Etar
Natsionalen stadion Vasil Levski	2020–21 First Professional Football League (Bulgaria) (Bulgaria) Location of Sofia teams.		Ivaylo
Capacity: 44,000	2020–21 First Professional Football League (Bulgaria) (Bulgaria) Location of Sofia teams.		Capacity: 15,000
Levski	2020–21 First Professional Football League (Bulgaria) (Bulgaria) Location of Sofia teams.		Lokomotiv
Vivacom Arena - Georgi Asparuhov	2020–21 First Professional Football League (Bulgaria) (Bulgaria) Location of Sofia teams.		Lokomotiv
Capacity: 25,000	2020–21 First Professional Football League (Bulgaria) (Bulgaria) Location of Sofia teams.		Capacity: 13,220
Ludogorets	Montana	Slavia	Tsarsko Selo
Huvepharma Arena	Ogosta	Slavia	Arena Tsarsko Selo
Capacity: 10,422	Capacity: 6,000	Capacity: 25,556	Capacity: 1,550

=== Personnel and kits ===
Note: Flags indicate national team as has been defined under FIFA eligibility rules. Players and managers may hold more than one non-FIFA nationality.

Team	Manager	Captain	Kit manufacturer	Shirt sponsor	Additional
Arda	(Bulgaria) Nikolay Kirov	(Bulgaria) Plamen Krumov	Nike	efbet	—
Beroe	(Bulgaria) Petar Kolev	(Bulgaria) Aleksandar Tsvetkov	Uhlsport	—	Refan, Ajax Group
Botev Plovdiv	(Bosnia and Herzegovina) Azrudin Valentić	(Bulgaria) Todor Nedelev	Uhlsport	WinBet	—
Botev Vratsa	(Bulgaria) Veselin Velikov	(Bulgaria) Valeri Domovchiyski	Erreà	WinBet	Kozloduy NPP
Cherno More	(Bulgaria) Ilian Iliev	(Bulgaria) Daniel Dimov	Uhlsport	Armeets	—
CSKA 1948	(Bulgaria) Todor Kiselichkov (interim)	(Bulgaria) Galin Ivanov	Adidas	efbet	Bachkovo
CSKA Sofia	(Bulgaria) Lyuboslav Penev	(Bulgaria) Petar Zanev	Adidas	A1	WinBet, Baristo
Etar	(Bulgaria) Aleksandar Tomash	(Bulgaria) Hristo Ivanov	Joma	WinBet	—
Levski Sofia	(Slovenia) Slaviša Stojanovič	(Bulgaria) Nikolay Mihaylov	Joma	Strabag	PalmsBet, Belfry Group
Lokomotiv Plovdiv	(Bulgaria) Aleksandar Tunchev	(Bulgaria) Dimitar Iliev	Uhlsport (until round 29); Nike (since round 30)	WinBet	General Broker
Ludogorets	(Lithuania) Valdas Dambrauskas	(Bulgaria) Svetoslav Dyakov	Nike	efbet	Vivacom
Montana	(Bulgaria) Svetlan Kondev	(Bulgaria) Ivan Mihov	Joma	efbet	—
Slavia Sofia	(Bulgaria) Zlatomir Zagorčić	(Bulgaria) Georgi Petkov	Joma	bet365	Asset Insurance
Tsarsko Selo	(Bulgaria) Antoni Zdravkov	(Bulgaria) Reyan Daskalov	Nike	WinBet	—

Note: Individual clubs may wear jerseys with advertising. However, only one sponsorship is permitted per jersey for official tournaments organised by UEFA in addition to that of the kit manufacturer (exceptions are made for non-profit organisations). Clubs in the domestic league can have more than one sponsorship per jersey which can feature on the front of the shirt, incorporated with the main sponsor or in place of it; or on the back, either below the squad number or on the collar area. Shorts also have space available for advertisement.

=== Managerial changes ===
Team	Outgoing manager	Manner of departure	Date of vacancy	Position in table	Incoming manager	Date of appointment
CSKA 1948	(Bulgaria) Yordan Yurukov	Mutual consent	4 June 2020	Pre-season	(Bulgaria) Krasimir Balakov	4 June 2020
Slavia Sofia	(Bulgaria) Zlatomir Zagorčić	Mutual consent	1 September 2020	13th	(Bulgaria) Martin Kushev	7 September 2020
Slavia Sofia	(Bulgaria) Martin Kushev	End of caretaker tenure	17 September 2020	13th	(Russia) Aleksandr Tarkhanov	17 September 2020
Botev Plovdiv	(Bulgaria) Ferario Spasov	Mutual consent	6 October 2020	12th	(Bulgaria) Petar Penchev	6 October 2020
Levski Sofia	(Bulgaria) Georgi Todorov	Resigned	25 October 2020	11th	(Bulgaria) Zhivko Milanov	25 October 2020
CSKA Sofia	(Bulgaria) Stamen Belchev	Mutual consent	26 October 2020	5th	(Brazil) Daniel Morales	26 October 2020
Ludogorets	(Czech Republic) Pavel Vrba	Mutual consent	26 October 2020	2nd	(Bulgaria) Stanislav Genchev	26 October 2020
Levski Sofia	(Bulgaria) Zhivko Milanov	End of caretaker tenure	10 November 2020	12th	(Slovenia) Slaviša Stojanovič	10 November 2020
Etar	(Bulgaria) Petko Petkov	Mutual consent	10 November 2020	14th	(Bulgaria) Kaloyan Chakarov	11 November 2020
Lokomotiv Plovdiv	(Bosnia and Herzegovina) Bruno Akrapović	Signed by CSKA Sofia	11 November 2020	2nd	(Bulgaria) Aleksandar Tunchev	11 November 2020
CSKA Sofia	(Brazil) Daniel Morales	End of caretaker tenure	11 November 2020	5th	(Bosnia and Herzegovina) Bruno Akrapović	11 November 2020
Etar	(Bulgaria) Kaloyan Chakarov	End of caretaker tenure	19 November 2020	14th	(Bulgaria) Aleksandar Tomash	19 November 2020
Montana	(Bulgaria) Nikola Spasov	Death	23 November 2020	12th	(Bulgaria) Atanas Atanasov	1 December 2020
Botev Plovdiv	(Bulgaria) Petar Penchev	Demoted to youth team	7 December 2020	10th	(Bulgaria) Stefan Stoyanov	7 December 2020
Ludogorets	(Bulgaria) Stanislav Genchev	Demoted to assistant	3 January 2021	1st	(Lithuania) Valdas Dambrauskas	3 January 2021
Botev Plovdiv	(Bulgaria) Stefan Stoyanov	End of caretaker tenure	8 January 2021	10th	(Bosnia and Herzegovina) Azrudin Valentić	8 January 2021
Botev Vratsa	(Bulgaria) Antoni Zdravkov	Resigned	13 March 2021	12th	(Bulgaria) Veselin Velikov	15 March 2021
CSKA 1948	(Bulgaria) Krasimir Balakov	Demoted	21 March 2021	6th	(Bulgaria) Rosen Kirilov	23 March 2021
CSKA Sofia	(Bosnia and Herzegovina) Bruno Akrapović	Sacked	28 March 2021	3rd	(Bulgaria) Lyuboslav Penev	28 March 2021
Tsarsko Selo	(Bulgaria) Lyuboslav Penev	Signed by CSKA Sofia	28 March 2021	9th	(Bulgaria) Antoni Zdravkov	29 March 2021
Slavia Sofia	(Russia) Aleksandr Tarkhanov	Mutual consent	11 April 2021	13th	(Bulgaria) Zlatomir Zagorčić	11 April 2021
Beroe	(Bulgaria) Dimitar Dimitrov	Resigned	21 April 2021	5th	(Bulgaria) Petar Kolev	22 April 2021
CSKA 1948	(Bulgaria) Rosen Kirilov	Mutual consent	24 April 2021	6th	(Bulgaria) Todor Kiselichkov	24 April 2021
Montana	(Bulgaria) Atanas Atanasov	Mutual consent	15 May 2021	14th	(Bulgaria) Svetlan Kondev	15 May 2021

== Regular season ==
=== League table ===
Pos	Team	Pld	W	D	L	GF	GA	GD	Pts	Qualification
1	Ludogorets Razgrad	26	20	4	2	59	18	+41	64	Qualification for the Championship group
2	Lokomotiv Plovdiv	26	15	7	4	41	19	+22	52	Qualification for the Championship group
3	CSKA Sofia	26	14	8	4	39	20	+19	50	Qualification for the Championship group
4	Arda	26	12	9	5	36	29	+7	45	Qualification for the Championship group
5	CSKA 1948	26	10	8	8	34	30	+4	38	Qualification for the Championship group
6	Beroe	26	10	7	9	38	28	+10	37 (Note: Head-to-head points (GD): Beroe 3 (+3), Cherno More 3 (-3).)	Qualification for the Championship group
7	Cherno More	26	10	7	9	27	25	+2	37	Qualification for the Europa Conference League group
8	Tsarsko Selo	26	9	7	10	29	27	+2	34	Qualification for the Europa Conference League group
9	Levski Sofia	26	7	7	12	25	27	−2	28	Qualification for the Europa Conference League group
10	Botev Plovdiv	26	5	9	12	25	46	−21	24	Qualification for the Europa Conference League group
11	Slavia Sofia	26	6	5	15	19	40	−21	23	Qualification for the Relegation group
12	Botev Vratsa	26	6	4	16	26	39	−13	22 (Note: Head-to-head points (GD): Botev Vratsa 4, Etar 1.)	Qualification for the Relegation group
13	Etar	26	4	10	12	20	45	−25	22	Qualification for the Relegation group
14	Montana	26	4	8	14	21	46	−25	20	Qualification for the Relegation group

Source: Soccerway, Bulgarian Football
Rules for classification: 1) Points; 2) Head-to-head points; 3) Head-to-head goal difference; 4) Head-to-head goals scored; 5) Head-to-head away goals scored (only if two teams); 6) Goal difference; 7) Goals scored; 8) Fairplay ranking; 9) Draw.

=== Results ===
Home \ Away	ARD	BSZ	BPD	BVR	CHM	CSK	CSS	ETA	LEV	LPD	LUD	MON	SLA	TSS
Arda	—	1–0	3–2	3–2	1–0	1–1	1–1	3–2	1–1	0–2	2–2	3–0	2–1	2–0
Beroe	0–1	—	3–0	6–0	4–0	0–0	1–0	1–2	2–1	1–3	1–4	0–0	1–1	0–1
Botev Plovdiv	0–2	3–3	—	2–0	0–0	3–2	0–3	1–1	2–1	2–0	0–2	1–1	0–1	0–0
Botev Vratsa	0–0	1–2	1–2	—	0–1	0–0	1–2	5–1	1–3	0–1	3–1	2–0	1–2	0–3
Cherno More	2–0	2–1	1–0	2–1	—	1–2	1–1	0–1	0–0	0–0	1–4	3–0	3–2	1–0
CSKA 1948	0–2	1–0	5–0	1–0	0–0	—	2–2	5–1	0–0	1–0	0–3	2–0	5–1	2–1
CSKA Sofia	1–1	1–1	2–1	2–1	1–0	2–0	—	1–0	1–0	0–0	2–2	6–0	1–0	1–0
Etar	0–0	2–3	0–0	0–0	0–4	3–1	2–2	—	0–0	1–3	0–2	0–0	1–1	1–0
Levski Sofia	1–2	0–2	2–2	0–0	1–2	3–0	0–2	2–1	—	1–0	0–3	2–0	1–0	0–1
Lokomotiv Plovdiv	0–0	1–1	6–0	2–1	2–1	1–1	2–1	1–1	1–0	—	3–2	2–2	2–0	2–0
Ludogorets	1–0	2–0	2–1	2–1	1–0	4–0	1–0	6–0	1–0	3–1	—	1–0	3–0	1–1
Montana	3–3	1–1	3–1	0–1	1–1	1–0	1–2	1–0	0–4	0–1	1–3	—	2–1	3–4
Slavia Sofia	3–2	0–2	0–0	0–2	1–1	1–3	0–1	0–0	1–0	0–2	0–2	2–1	—	1–0
Tsarsko Selo	4–0	0–2	2–2	1–2	1–0	0–0	2–1	3–0	2–2	0–3	1–1	0–0	2–0	—

Source: Bulgarian Football
Legend: Blue = home team win; Yellow = draw; Red = away team win.
For upcoming matches, an "a" indicates there is an article about the rivalry between the two participants.

=== Positions by round ===
Team ╲ Round	1	2	3	4	5	6	7	8	9	10	11	12	13	14	15	16	17	18	19	20	21	22	23	24	25	26
Ludogorets	11	8	3	2	1	2	1	2	2	2	1	1	1	1	1	1	1	1	1	1	1	1	1	1	1	1
Lokomotiv Plovdiv	13	6	4	3	6	5	2	1	1	1	2	2	2	2	2	2	3	3	3	3	3	2	2	2	2	2
CSKA Sofia	7	4	2	1	3	4	5	4	4	5	5	3	3	4	3	3	2	2	2	2	2	3	3	3	3	3
Arda	5	9	5	6	5	3	4	5	5	7	6	5	4	3	4	4	4	4	4	4	4	4	4	4	4	4
CSKA 1948	8	11	11	11	8	10	9	7	7	4	3	4	5	6	5	6	6	6	6	6	7	6	6	6	6	5
Beroe	3	3	7	4	2	1	3	3	3	3	4	6	6	7	6	5	5	5	5	5	5	5	5	5	5	6
Cherno More	9	1	9	10	10	12	12	11	10	6	8	7	7	5	7	7	7	7	7	7	6	7	7	7	7	7
Tsarsko Selo	1	2	1	5	4	7	8	6	6	8	9	9	9	11	8	8	9	9	8	8	8	9	9	8	8	8
Levski Sofia	12	12	12	8	7	6	6	9	9	11	12	12	12	10	11	9	8	8	9	9	9	8	8	9	9	9
Botev Plovdiv	4	5	8	9	9	11	11	12	12	9	11	10	10	9	10	12	12	12	12	12	10	10	10	10	10	10
Slavia Sofia	10	13	13	13	13	13	13	13	13	13	13	13	13	13	13	13	13	13	11	13	11	12	13	11	12	11
Botev Vratsa	2	7	10	12	12	9	7	8	8	10	7	8	8	8	9	10	10	11	13	10	12	13	14	13	11	12
Etar	14	14	14	14	14	14	14	14	14	14	14	14	14	14	14	14	14	14	14	14	14	14	11	12	13	13
Montana	6	10	6	7	11	8	10	10	11	12	10	11	11	12	12	11	11	10	10	11	13	11	12	14	14	14

Source: Bulgarian Football

=== Results by round ===
Team ╲ Round	1	2	3	4	5	6	7	8	9	10	11	12	13	14	15	16	17	18	19	20	21	22	23	24	25	26
Arda	D	D	W	W	D	W	L	D	D	D	W	D	W	W	W	D	W	W	L	W	L	L	D	W	W	L
Beroe	W	D	D	W	W	W	L	L	D	W	L	W	D	W	L	W	W	D	L	L	D	W	L	L	L	D
Botev Plovdiv	W	L	D	L	D	L	W	L	D	W	D	D	L	L	L	L	L	D	D	D	W	D	W	L	L	L
Botev Vratsa	W	L	L	L	D	W	W	D	D	L	W	L	L	L	L	L	L	L	L	W	L	L	L	D	W	L
Cherno More	D	W	L	L	D	L	W	L	W	W	L	D	W	W	L	L	D	L	W	L	W	D	D	D	W	W
CSKA 1948	D	D	L	D	W	L	W	W	D	W	W	L	D	L	W	D	W	L	D	L	L	W	W	D	L	W
CSKA Sofia	D	W	W	W	D	D	L	D	D	D	W	W	W	W	W	W	W	W	L	D	W	L	D	L	W	W
Etar	L	L	L	L	L	L	L	D	D	L	L	D	D	W	W	D	L	D	D	W	L	D	W	D	L	D
Levski Sofia	L	D	L	W	W	W	L	D	L	L	L	W	L	L	L	D	W	D	D	D	W	W	D	L	L	L
Lokomotiv Plovdiv	L	W	W	W	L	W	W	W	D	W	D	L	D	W	W	W	D	W	D	D	D	W	W	W	W	L
Ludogorets	L	W	W	W	W	D	W	D	D	W	W	W	W	W	W	W	W	L	W	W	W	D	W	W	W	W
Montana	D	D	W	L	L	W	L	W	L	L	D	L	D	L	L	D	L	W	D	L	L	D	L	L	L	D
Slavia Sofia	D	L	L	L	L	L	W	L	W	L	D	W	D	L	L	L	L	D	W	L	W	L	L	W	L	D
Tsarsko Selo	W	D	W	D	D	L	L	W	D	L	L	L	L	L	W	D	L	D	W	W	L	D	L	W	W	W

Source: Bulgarian Football
W = Win; D = Draw; L = Loss

== Championship round ==
=== Championship round table ===
Points and goals will carry over in full from regular season.

Pos	Team	Pld	W	D	L	GF	GA	GD	Pts	Qualification	LUD	LPD	CSS	ARD	CSK	BSZ
1	Ludogorets Razgrad (C)	31	22	4	5	69	29	+40	70	Qualification for the Champions League first qualifying round	—	1–2	—	4–1	—	3–1
2	Lokomotiv Plovdiv	31	17	10	4	48	23	+25	61	Qualification for the Europa Conference League second qualifying round (Note: CSKA Sofia qualified for the Europa Conference League second qualifying round by winning the 2020–21 Bulgarian Cup.)	—	—	2–0	—	0–0	0–0
3	CSKA Sofia	31	17	8	6	46	24	+22	59	Qualification for the Europa Conference League second qualifying round	4–1	—	—	1–0	—	2–0
4	Arda (O)	31	13	11	7	42	37	+5	50	Qualification for the Europa Conference League play-off	—	3–3	—	—	0–0	—
5	CSKA 1948	31	12	11	8	41	34	+7	47		3–1	—	1–0	—	—	—
6	Beroe	31	10	9	12	42	38	+4	39		—	—	—	0–2	3–3	—

Source: Soccerway
Legend: Blue = home team win; Yellow = draw; Red = away team win.
Rules for classification: 1) Points; 2) Head-to-head points; 3) Head-to-head goal difference; 4) Head-to-head goals scored; 5) Head-to-head away goals scored (only if two teams); 6) Goal difference; 7) Goals scored; 8) Fairplay ranking; 9) Draw.
(C) Champions; (O) Play-off winners

=== Positions by round ===
Below the positions per round are shown. As teams did not all start with an equal number of points, the initial pre-playoffs positions are also given.

Team ╲ Round	26	27	28	29	30	31
Ludogorets Razgrad	1	1	1	1	1	1
Lokomotiv Plovdiv	2	2	2	2	2	2
CSKA Sofia	3	3	3	3	3	3
Arda	4	4	4	4	4	4
CSKA 1948	5	5	5	5	5	5
Beroe	6	6	6	6	6	6

Source: Bulgarian Football

== Europa Conference League round ==
Points and goals will carry over in full from regular season.

=== Europa Conference League round table ===
Pos	Team	Pld	W	D	L	GF	GA	GD	Pts	Qualification	CHM	LEV	TSS	BPD
1	Cherno More	32	12	9	11	37	34	+3	45	Qualification for the Europa Conference League play-off	—	1–2	3–3	3–1
2	Levski Sofia	32	11	8	13	34	32	+2	41		2–1	—	1–1	1–2
3	Tsarsko Selo	32	9	10	13	33	39	−6	37		0–1	0–2	—	0–0
4	Botev Plovdiv	32	7	11	14	34	52	−18	32		1–1	0–1	5–0	—

Source: Bulgarian Football
Legend: Blue = home team win; Yellow = draw; Red = away team win.
Rules for classification: 1) Points; 2) Head-to-head points; 3) Head-to-head goal difference; 4) Head-to-head goals scored; 5) Head-to-head away goals scored (only if two teams); 6) Goal difference; 7) Goals scored; 8) Fairplay ranking; 9) Draw.

=== Positions by round ===
Below the positions per round are shown. As teams did not all start with an equal number of points, the initial pre-playoffs positions are also given.

Team ╲ Round	26	27	28	29	30	31	32
Cherno More	7	7	7	7	7	7	7
Levski Sofia	9	9	9	8	8	8	8
Tsarsko Selo	8	8	8	9	9	9	9
Botev Plovdiv	10	10	10	10	10	10	10

Updated to match(es) played on 23 May 2021. Source: Bulgarian Football

== Relegation round ==
Points and goals will carry over in full from regular season.

=== Relegation round table ===
Pos	Team	Pld	W	D	L	GF	GA	GD	Pts	Qualification or relegation	SLA	BVR	MON	ETA
1	Slavia Sofia	32	9	7	16	28	44	−16	34		—	2–0	1–1	0–2
2	Botev Vratsa (O)	32	8	6	18	31	45	−14	30	Qualification for the relegation play-off	1–1	—	1–0	2–0
3	Montana (R)	32	6	10	16	26	52	−26	28 (Note: Head-to-head points: Montana 10, Etar 1.)	Relegation to the Second League	0–2	1–1	—	1–0
4	Etar (R)	32	6	10	16	25	53	−28	28	Relegation to the Second League	0–3	2–0	1–2	—

Source: Bulgarian Football
Legend: Blue = home team win; Yellow = draw; Red = away team win.
Rules for classification: 1) Points; 2) Head-to-head points; 3) Head-to-head goal difference; 4) Head-to-head goals scored; 5) Head-to-head away goals scored (only if two teams); 6) Goal difference; 7) Goals scored; 8) Fairplay ranking; 9) Draw.
(O) Play-off winners; (R) Relegated

=== Positions by round ===
Below the positions per round are shown. As teams did not all start with an equal number of points, the initial pre-playoffs positions are also given.

Team ╲ Round	26	27	28	29	30	31	32
Slavia Sofia	11	12	11	11	11	11	11
Botev Vratsa	12	11	12	12	12	12	12
Montana	14	14	13	13	14	13	13
Etar	13	13	14	14	13	14	14

Updated to match(es) played on 21 May 2021. Source: Bulgarian Football

== Europa Conference League play-off ==
30 May 2021
19:00 EEST

Arda	1–0	Cherno More
Kokonov 18'	Report

Arena Arda, Kardzhali
Attendance: 3,500
Referee: Stanislav Todorov (Shumen)

== Promotion/relegation play-off ==
28 May 2021
19:00 EEST

Botev Vratsa	1–0	Septemvri Sofia
Zlatinski 76' (pen.)	Report

Slavia, Sofia
Attendance: 600
Referee: Dragomir Draganov (Varna)

== Season statistics ==
=== Top scorers ===
As of 30 May 2021

Rank	Player	Club	Goals
1	(Romania) Claudiu Keșerü	Ludogorets	18
2	(Bulgaria) Atanas Iliev	Botev Plovdiv	16
3	(Martinique) Mathias Coureur	Cherno More	15
4	(Bulgaria) Martin Kamburov	Beroe (Note: Includes 9 goals for CSKA 1948)	14
5	(Bulgaria) Dimitar Iliev	Lokomotiv Plovdiv	13
6	(Bulgaria) Preslav Borukov	Etar	12
7	(Senegal) Alioune Fall	Beroe	10
8	(Bulgaria) Galin Ivanov	CSKA 1948	9
8	(Bulgaria) Georgi Minchev	Lokomotiv Plovdiv	9
8	(Bulgaria) Ivan Kokonov	Arda	9

=== Clean sheets ===
As of 30 May 2021

Rank	Player	Club	Clean sheets
1	(Bulgaria) Daniel Naumov	CSKA 1948	12
2	(Bulgaria) Ivan Karadzhov	Arda	11
3	(Brazil) Gustavo Busatto	CSKA Sofia	10
4	(Bulgaria) Ilko Pirgov	Lokomotiv Plovdiv	8
4	(Bulgaria) Krasimir Kostov	Botev Vratsa	8
4	(Haiti) Johny Placide	Tsarsko Selo	8
4	(Bulgaria) Martin Lukov	Lokomotiv Plovdiv	8
8	(Bulgaria) Georgi Georgiev	Cherno More	6
8	(Bulgaria) Hristo Ivanov	Etar	6
8	(Croatia) Zvonimir Mikulić	Levski Sofia	6
