= 2019–20 First Professional Football League (Bulgaria) =

96th season of top-tier football league in Bulgaria

First Professional Football League
- Season: 2019–20
- Dates: 12 July 2019 – 11 July 2020
- Champions: Ludogorets Razgrad (9th title)
- Relegated: Dunav Ruse; Vitosha Bistritsa
- Champions League: Ludogorets Razgrad
- Europa League: Lokomotiv Plovdiv; CSKA Sofia; Slavia Sofia
- Matches: 215
- Goals: 539 (2.51 per match)
- Top goalscorer: Martin Kamburov (18 goals)
- Best goalkeeper: Gustavo Busatto (17 clean sheets)
- Biggest home win: Ludogorets 6–0 Botev Vratsa (15 February 2020)
- Biggest away win: Etar 0–5 Lokomotiv Plovdiv (5 October 2019)
- Highest scoring: Vitosha Bistritsa 2–6 Etar (2 March 2020); Etar 5–3 Dunav Ruse (11 June 2020)
- Longest winning run: 10 games by Ludogorets
- Longest unbeaten run: 30 games by Ludogorets
- Longest winless run: 29 games by Vitosha Bistritsa
- Longest losing run: 7 games by Vitosha Bistritsa
- Highest attendance: 24,687; Levski Sofia 0–0 CSKA Sofia (15 February 2020)
- Lowest attendance: 60; Arda 2–0 Vitosha Bistritsa (22 November 2019); Tsarsko Selo 0–3 Botev Plovdiv (30 November 2019)
- All statistics correct as of 12 July 2020.

The 2019–20 First Professional Football League, also known as Efbet League for sponsorship reasons, was the 96th season of the top division of the Bulgarian football league system, the 72nd since a league format was adopted for the national competition of A Group as a top tier of the pyramid, and also the 4th season of the First Professional Football League, which decides the Bulgarian champion. Ludogorets Razgrad were the defending champions after winning their 8th consecutive title in the previous season. On 21 June 2020 the team from Razgrad clinched its 9th championship with four games to spare after a 2:1 win home win over Beroe. The season began in July 2019 and was scheduled to end in May 2020, but was completed in July 2020.

== Impact of the coronavirus pandemic ==
=== Suspension of championship and measures pertaining to fan attendance after resumption ===
After the possibility of playing matches without spectators was initially envisioned, on 13 March 2020, the Bulgarian Football Union decided to suspend all fixtures until 13 April in accordance with the measures taken to combat the COVID-19 pandemic. On 3 April 2020, the state of national emergency was extended until 13 May 2020 and on 11 April the Minister of Youth and Sports Krasen Kralev confirmed that no mass participation sports events and full training sessions will be held until that date. On 14 May, it was announced that footballers would be given the opportunity to train together over the course of the next three weeks, subject to the observance of strict rules and a gradual increase in the number of participants. The competitive matches resumed on 5 June (with the post-regular season phase – the championship and relegation rounds – shortened in half). The expectations in mid May were that no fans would be allowed, but on 2 June a decree by Minister of Health Kiril Ananiev permitted the presence of spectators, subject to the restriction that no more than 30% of the stadium capacity is occupied and social distancing in terms of seating is adhered to. On 12 June, it was decided that since 15 June the stadiums could be filled up to 50% capacity. On 23 June, a requirement of no more than 1000 spectators per section of the stands was imposed. The match between Vitosha and Tsarsko Selo was postponed from 26 June to 27 June after it was reported that four Vitosha players and a physiotherapist had tested positive for COVID-19, but their PCR tests eventually produced negative results. Due to a number of fans and Lokomotiv Plovdiv players who had tested positive in the aftermath of the Bulgarian Cup final, the 9 July match between Lokomotiv Plovdiv and CSKA Sofia (the same teams that contested the final) was held behind closed doors. After a continuous rise in the number of infections in the period between mid June and early July, in a decree valid from 10 July, spectators were once again forbidden to attend football matches.

=== Footballers with positive tests for COVID-19 ===
In May 2020, prior to the restart of the matches, Emil Viyachki and Krasimir Stanoev tested positive for the coronavirus. Tomi Juric (in June 2020) and Martin Kavdanski's results (in July 2020) also turned out to be positive. In Kavdanski case, his initial result had come back negative due to a laboratory mix-up, as a result of which he played in the match against Cherno More on 2 July. On 6 July, it was announced that three additional Tsarsko Selo footballers as well as sixteen footballers and staff members from Cherno More had been identified as having the virus. Between 8 July and 10 July, it was officially confirmed that nine Lokomotiv Plovdiv players and two non-playing personnel members had been infected. Positive tests were also reported for two Dunav Ruse footballers and one from Botev Plovdiv. Infected footballers were subject to a 14-day quarantine, with the majority of them reportedly either asymptomatic or with mild symptoms that did not require hospitalization.

== Teams ==
Fourteen teams are competing in the league – the top twelve teams from the previous season, and two teams promoted from the Second League.

Tsarsko Selo Sofia were promoted as champions of the 2018–19 Second League. This will be their debut in the Bulgarian top tier. Tsarsko Selo replaces Vereya, who were disqualified for match-fixing, ending their 3-year stay in the Bulgarian top tier.

The second team to be promoted was Arda, who earned promotion after winning their play-off match against Septemvri Sofia. Arda's win meant that the team will make their first appearance in the Bulgarian top tier, while Septemvri ended their two-year stay in the First League.

=== Stadiums and locations ===
Arda	Beroe	Botev Plovdiv	Botev Vratsa
Arena Arda	Stadion Beroe	Futbolen kompleks Botev 1912	Stadion Hristo Botev
Capacity: 15,000	Capacity: 12,128	Capacity: 4,000	Capacity: 12,000
Cherno More	2019–20 First Professional Football League (Bulgaria) (Bulgaria) Location of Sofia teams.		CSKA
Stadion Ticha	2019–20 First Professional Football League (Bulgaria) (Bulgaria) Location of Sofia teams.		Stadion Balgarska Armia
Capacity: 8,250	2019–20 First Professional Football League (Bulgaria) (Bulgaria) Location of Sofia teams.		Capacity: 22,995
Dunav Ruse	2019–20 First Professional Football League (Bulgaria) (Bulgaria) Location of Sofia teams.		Etar
Gradski stadion	2019–20 First Professional Football League (Bulgaria) (Bulgaria) Location of Sofia teams.		Stadion Ivaylo
Capacity: 12,400	2019–20 First Professional Football League (Bulgaria) (Bulgaria) Location of Sofia teams.		Capacity: 15,000
Levski	2019–20 First Professional Football League (Bulgaria) (Bulgaria) Location of Sofia teams.		Lokomotiv
Stadion Georgi Asparuhov	2019–20 First Professional Football League (Bulgaria) (Bulgaria) Location of Sofia teams.		Stadion Lokomotiv
Capacity: 25,000	2019–20 First Professional Football League (Bulgaria) (Bulgaria) Location of Sofia teams.		Capacity: 13,220
Ludogorets	Slavia	Tsarsko Selo	Vitosha
Huvepharma Arena	Stadion Slavia	Arena Tsarsko Selo	Stadion Bistritsa
Capacity: 10,422	Capacity: 25,556	Capacity: 1,550	Capacity: 2,500

=== Personnel and kits ===
Note: Flags indicate national team as has been defined under FIFA eligibility rules. Players and managers may hold more than one non-FIFA nationality.

Team	Manager	Captain	Kit manufacturer	Shirt sponsor	Additional
Arda	(Bulgaria) Nikolay Kirov	(Bulgaria) Plamen Krumov	Nike	Efbet	—
Beroe	(Bulgaria) Dimitar Dimitrov	(Bulgaria) Martin Kamburov	Uhlsport	—	Refan, Ajax Group
Botev Plovdiv	(Bulgaria) Ferario Spasov	(Bulgaria) Lachezar Baltanov	Uhlsport	WinBet	—
Botev Vratsa	(Bulgaria) Antoni Zdravkov	(Bulgaria) Valeri Domovchiyski	Errea	WinBet	—
CSKA Sofia	(Bulgaria) Stamen Belchev	(Bulgaria) Petar Zanev	Adidas	A1 Bulgaria	WinBet, Baristo
Cherno More	(Bulgaria) Ilian Iliev	(Bulgaria) Daniel Dimov	Uhlsport	Armeets	—
Dunav Ruse	(Bulgaria) Lyudmil Kirov	(Bulgaria) Diyan Dimov	Joma	WinBet	—
Etar	(Bulgaria) Petko Petkov	(Bulgaria) Hristo Ivanov	Joma	WinBet	—
Levski Sofia	(Bulgaria) Georgi Todorov	(Bulgaria) Zhivko Milanov	Nike	7777.bg	—
Lokomotiv Plovdiv	(Bosnia and Herzegovina) Bruno Akrapović	(Bulgaria) Dimitar Iliev	Uhlsport	Efbet	General Broker
Ludogorets	(Czech Republic) Pavel Vrba	(Bulgaria) Svetoslav Dyakov	Nike	Efbet	Vivacom
Slavia Sofia	(Bulgaria) Zlatomir Zagorčić	(Bulgaria) Georgi Petkov	Joma	bet365	Asset Insurance
Tsarsko Selo	(Bulgaria) Luboslav Penev	(Bulgaria) Reyan Daskalov	Nike	WinBet	—
Vitosha Bistritsa	(Bulgaria) Asen Bukarev	(Bulgaria) Chetin Sadula	Jumper	Efbet	Athletic Fitness

Note: Individual clubs may wear jerseys with advertising. However, only one sponsorship is permitted per jersey for official tournaments organised by UEFA in addition to that of the kit manufacturer (exceptions are made for non-profit organisations). Clubs in the domestic league can have more than one sponsorship per jersey which can feature on the front of the shirt, incorporated with the main sponsor or in place of it; or on the back, either below the squad number or on the collar area. Shorts also have space available for advertisement.

=== Managerial changes ===
Team	Outgoing manager	Manner of departure	Date of vacancy	Position in table	Incoming manager	Date of appointment
Levski Sofia	(Bulgaria) Georgi Todorov	End of caretaker tenure	29 May 2019	Pre-season	(Bulgaria) Petar Hubchev	29 May 2019
Etar	(Bulgaria) Krasimir Balakov	Signed by Bulgaria	29 May 2019	Pre-season	(Bulgaria) Rosen Kirilov	9 June 2019
Botev Plovdiv	(Bulgaria) Nikolay Kirov	Sacked	29 May 2019	Pre-season	(Montenegro) Željko Petrović	9 June 2019
Vitosha Bistritsa	(Bulgaria) Rosen Kirilov	Mutual consent	3 June 2019	Pre-season	(Bulgaria) Engibar Engibarov	6 June 2019
Ludogorets	(Bulgaria) Stoycho Stoev	Sacked	25 August 2019	2nd	(Bulgaria) Stanislav Genchev	25 August 2019
CSKA Sofia	(Serbia) Ljupko Petrović	Mutual consent	2 October 2019	4th	(Serbia) Miloš Kruščić	2 October 2019
Botev Plovdiv	(Montenegro) Željko Petrović	Sacked	16 October 2019	13th	(Bulgaria) Ferario Spasov	16 October 2019
Beroe	(Bulgaria) Aleksandar Tomash	Mutual consent	22 October 2019	8th	(Bulgaria) Dimitar Dimitrov	23 October 2019
Botev Vratsa	(Bulgaria) Sasho Angelov	Mutual consent	5 November 2019	12th	(Bulgaria) Antoni Zdravkov	11 November 2019
Etar	(Bulgaria) Rosen Kirilov	Mutual consent	2 December 2019	10th	(Bulgaria) Petko Petkov	10 December 2019
Vitosha Bistritsa	(Bulgaria) Engibar Engibarov	Mutual consent	17 December 2019	14th	(Bulgaria) Asen Bukarev	27 December 2019
Ludogorets	(Bulgaria) Stanislav Genchev	End of caretaker tenure	1 January 2020	1st	(Czech Republic) Pavel Vrba	1 January 2020
Tsarsko Selo	(Bulgaria) Nikola Spasov	Mutual consent	1 April 2020	11th	(Bulgaria) Luboslav Penev	30 April 2020
Arda Kardzhali	(Bulgaria) Stamen Belchev	Mutual consent	14 April 2020	9th	(Bulgaria) Nikolay Kirov	21 April 2020
Levski Sofia	(Bulgaria) Petar Hubchev	Mutual consent	11 June 2020	4th	(Bulgaria) Georgi Todorov	11 June 2020
CSKA Sofia	(Serbia) Miloš Kruščić	Mutual consent	2 July 2020	3rd	(Bulgaria) Stamen Belchev	2 July 2020

== Regular season ==
=== League table ===
Pos	Team	Pld	W	D	L	GF	GA	GD	Pts	Qualification
1	Ludogorets Razgrad	26	18	8	0	46	12	+34	62	Qualification for the Championship round
2	Lokomotiv Plovdiv	26	14	8	4	49	23	+26	50 (Note: Head-to-head points (GD): Lokomotiv Plovdiv 4, CSKA Sofia 1.)	Qualification for the Championship round
3	CSKA Sofia	26	14	8	4	41	17	+24	50	Qualification for the Championship round
4	Levski Sofia	26	14	7	5	43	19	+24	49	Qualification for the Championship round
5	Slavia Sofia	26	13	6	7	36	28	+8	45	Qualification for the Championship round
6	Beroe	26	14	1	11	44	34	+10	43	Qualification for the Championship round
7	Cherno More	26	10	10	6	32	24	+8	40	Qualification for the Relegation round
8	Arda	26	7	10	9	27	33	−6	31	Qualification for the Relegation round
9	Botev Plovdiv	26	8	6	12	26	30	−4	30	Qualification for the Relegation round
10	Etar	26	6	9	11	31	45	−14	27	Qualification for the Relegation round
11	Tsarsko Selo	26	7	4	15	24	42	−18	25	Qualification for the Relegation round
12	Botev Vratsa	26	5	7	14	21	46	−25	22	Qualification for the Relegation round
13	Dunav Ruse	26	4	7	15	21	49	−28	19	Qualification for the Relegation round
14	Vitosha Bistritsa	26	1	3	22	15	54	−39	6	Qualification for the Relegation round

Source: Soccerway
Rules for classification: 1) Points; 2) Head-to-head points; 3) Head-to-head goal difference; 4) Head-to-head goals scored; 5) Head-to-head away goals scored (only if two teams); 6) Goal difference; 7) Goals scored; 8) Fairplay ranking; 9) Draw.

=== Results ===
Home \ Away	ARD	BER	BPD	BVR	CHM	CSK	DUN	ETA	LEV	LPD	LUD	SLA	TSS	VIT
Arda	—	3–1	0–0	2–1	0–0	0–0	0–2	2–1	1–3	2–5	1–1	0–1	0–2	2–0
Beroe	0–1	—	2–0	4–0	3–0	2–1	2–0	2–0	1–1	2–0	2–4	1–2	2–0	1–0
Botev Plovdiv	1–1	3–1	—	0–1	1–1	0–1	3–1	2–0	1–0	0–0	0–1	0–1	0–2	2–1
Botev Vratsa	3–1	1–3	3–0	—	1–1	0–3	0–0	2–1	0–0	1–4	0–1	0–2	0–1	1–1
Cherno More	1–1	2–0	2–0	4–1	—	0–2	1–1	1–1	2–2	3–1	1–2	0–0	1–0	2–0
CSKA Sofia	3–2	2–0	1–0	1–0	1–3	—	4–0	2–2	2–2	1–1	0–0	1–0	3–0	4–0
Dunav Ruse	0–0	0–3	1–2	0–0	0–2	1–1	—	0–2	1–4	0–3	0–1	0–0	3–1	2–0
Etar	1–1	2–1	2–2	1–1	1–0	0–4	5–3	—	0–0	0–5	1–1	0–2	1–1	1–0
Levski Sofia	2–1	1–3	3–1	3–1	3–0	0–0	2–0	3–0	—	1–0	0–1	1–2	2–0	2–0
Lokomotiv Plovdiv	0–0	3–0	1–1	2–0	1–0	1–0	3–1	2–0	0–0	—	1–1	3–2	4–0	1–1
Ludogorets	2–0	3–1	2–1	6–0	1–1	0–0	5–1	2–0	2–0	2–1	—	0–0	2–0	2–0
Slavia Sofia	2–3	2–4	2–1	2–2	0–1	1–2	3–1	2–1	0–2	1–1	1–1	—	1–0	3–2
Tsarsko Selo	0–0	2–1	0–3	3–0	1–1	2–1	1–2	2–2	0–2	2–3	0–2	1–3	—	1–0
Vitosha Bistritsa	1–3	1–2	0–2	0–2	0–2	0–1	1–1	2–6	0–4	2–3	0–1	0–1	3–2	—

Source: bulgarian-football.com
Legend: Blue = home team win; Yellow = draw; Red = away team win.

=== Positions by round ===
Team ╲ Round	1	2	3	4	5	6	7	8	9	10	11	12	13	14	15	16	17	18	19	20	21	22	23	24	25	26
Ludogorets	4	2	1	2	1	1	2	1	1	1	1	1	1	1	1	1	1	1	1	1	1	1	1	1	1	1
Lokomotiv Plovdiv	11	5	4	5	2	3	3	3	3	3	3	3	3	3	3	2	3	3	3	3	3	3	3	3	2	2
CSKA Sofia	7	11	7	6	7	5	5	4	4	4	4	4	4	4	4	4	4	4	4	4	4	4	4	4	3	3
Levski Sofia	1	3	2	1	3	2	1	2	2	2	2	2	2	2	2	3	2	2	2	2	2	2	2	2	4	4
Slavia Sofia	5	7	9	10	8	8	8	8	8	9	8	8	6	5	5	5	8	7	5	5	5	5	5	5	5	5
Beroe	2	6	10	7	5	4	4	6	6	6	6	7	8	7	7	8	7	8	8	9	7	6	6	7	6	6
Cherno More	3	1	3	3	4	6	6	7	7	7	7	5	5	6	6	7	6	5	6	6	6	7	7	6	7	7
Arda	9	10	5	4	6	7	7	5	5	5	5	6	7	8	8	6	5	6	7	7	9	9	9	8	8	8
Botev Plovdiv	8	4	6	8	10	12	11	9	9	12	13	13	13	13	11	11	9	9	9	8	8	8	8	9	9	9
Etar	6	9	8	9	11	11	13	12	12	8	9	11	9	9	10	9	10	10	10	10	10	10	10	10	10	10
Tsarsko Selo	13	12	13	13	13	10	9	13	13	13	11	12	11	11	9	12	12	12	12	12	11	11	11	11	11	11
Botev Vratsa	12	8	12	11	12	13	10	11	11	11	12	10	12	12	12	13	13	13	13	13	13	13	13	12	12	12
Dunav Ruse	14	14	11	12	9	9	12	10	10	10	10	9	10	10	13	10	11	11	11	11	12	12	12	13	13	13
Vitosha Bistritsa	10	13	14	14	14	14	14	14	14	14	14	14	14	14	14	14	14	14	14	14	14	14	14	14	14	14

Source: bulgarian-football.com

=== Results by round ===
Team ╲ Round	1	2	3	4	5	6	7	8	9	10	11	12	13	14	15	16	17	18	19	20	21	22	23	24	25	26
Arda	D	D	W	W	L	L	D	W	W	L	W	L	L	D	L	W	W	D	D	D	L	L	D	D	D	L
Beroe	W	L	L	W	W	W	L	L	W	L	W	L	L	W	L	L	W	D	L	W	W	W	W	L	W	W
Botev Plovdiv	D	W	L	D	L	L	W	D	L	L	L	L	L	D	W	W	W	W	W	W	D	L	D	L	L	L
Botev Vratsa	L	W	L	L	D	D	W	L	L	D	L	W	L	L	D	L	L	L	L	D	L	W	D	D	W	L
Cherno More	W	W	D	D	D	L	D	D	L	W	D	W	W	L	L	L	W	W	D	D	W	D	D	W	L	W
CSKA Sofia	D	L	W	W	D	W	D	D	W	W	L	W	L	W	W	W	W	D	D	W	D	W	L	W	W	D
Dunav Ruse	L	L	W	L	W	L	D	D	D	D	L	W	L	L	L	W	L	D	L	L	L	L	D	L	D	L
Etar	D	D	D	D	L	D	L	W	L	W	L	L	W	L	L	W	L	L	D	D	L	D	W	D	L	W
Levski Sofia	W	D	W	W	L	W	W	D	W	W	W	L	W	W	W	L	W	D	W	D	D	D	L	D	L	W
Lokomotiv Plovdiv	L	W	W	D	W	W	L	D	W	W	W	W	W	W	D	W	L	D	W	D	D	W	L	D	W	D
Ludogorets	W	W	W	D	D	W	D	W	W	W	W	W	W	W	W	W	W	D	D	D	W	D	D	W	W	W
Slavia Sofia	W	L	L	D	W	D	D	L	D	L	W	W	W	W	D	L	L	W	W	D	W	W	W	W	W	L
Tsarsko Selo	L	D	L	L	W	D	W	L	L	L	D	L	W	L	W	L	L	L	D	L	W	L	W	L	L	W
Vitosha Bistritsa	L	L	L	L	L	L	L	W	L	L	L	L	L	L	D	L	L	D	L	L	L	L	L	D	L	L

Source: bulgarian-football.com
W = Win; D = Draw; L = Loss

== Championship round ==
=== Championship round table ===
Points and goals will carry over in full from regular season.

Pos	Team	Pld	W	D	L	GF	GA	GD	Pts	Qualification	LUD	CSK	SLA	LEV	LPD	BER
1	Ludogorets Razgrad (C)	31	21	9	1	59	18	+41	72	Qualification for the Champions League first qualifying round	—	—	—	3–0	6–1	2–1
2	CSKA Sofia	31	16	11	4	52	22	+30	59	Qualification for the Europa League first qualifying round	1–1	—	—	3–3	—	5–0
3	Slavia Sofia (O)	31	16	7	8	42	32	+10	55	Qualification for the European play-off final	3–1	0–0	—	—	—	—
4	Levski Sofia	31	15	8	8	50	30	+20	53 (Note: Head-to-head points in the regular season: Levski 4, Lokomotiv Plovdiv 1.)		—	—	1–2	—	1–2	—
5	Lokomotiv Plovdiv	31	15	8	8	53	35	+18	53	Qualification for the Europa League first qualifying round (Note: Lokomotiv Plovdiv qualified for the Europa League first qualifying round by winning the 2019–20 Bulgarian Cup.)	—	1–2	0–1	—	—	0–2
6	Beroe	31	16	1	14	50	43	+7	49		—	—	2–0	1–2	—	—

Source: Soccerway
Legend: Blue = home team win; Yellow = draw; Red = away team win.
Rules for classification: 1) Points; 2) Head-to-head points; 3) Head-to-head goal difference; 4) Head-to-head goals scored; 5) Head-to-head away goals scored (only if two teams); 6) Goal difference; 7) Goals scored; 8) Fairplay ranking; 9) Draw.
(C) Champions; (O) Play-off winners

=== Positions by round ===
Below the positions per round are shown. As teams did not all start with an equal number of points, the initial pre-playoffs positions are also given.

Team ╲ Round	Initial	1	2	3	4	5
Ludogorets Razgrad	1	1	1	1	1	1
CSKA Sofia	3	2	3	3	2	2
Slavia Sofia	5	5	5	4	4	3
Levski Sofia	4	4	2	2	3	4
Lokomotiv Plovdiv	2	3	4	5	5	5
Beroe	6	6	6	6	6	6

Source: bulgarian-football.com

== Relegation round ==
Points and goals will carry over in full from regular season.

=== Group A ===
Pos	Team	Pld	W	D	L	GF	GA	GD	Pts	Qualification or relegation	CHM	ETA	TSS	VIT
1	Cherno More	29	12	11	6	39	27	+12	47	Qualification for the European play-off quarter-finals	—	2–2	—	1–0
2	Etar	29	7	10	12	34	48	−14	31 (Note: Head-to-head points in the regular season: Etar 2, Tsarsko Selo 2; GD 3:3; Etar with more away goals.)	Qualification for the European play-off quarter-finals	—	—	0–1	1–0
3	Tsarsko Selo	29	9	4	16	27	46	−19	31	Qualification for the relegation play-offs	1–4	—	—	—
4	Vitosha Bistritsa (R)	29	1	3	25	15	57	−42	6	Relegated to the Second League	—	—	0–1	—

Source: Soccerway
Legend: Blue = home team win; Yellow = draw; Red = away team win.
Rules for classification: 1) Points; 2) Head-to-head points; 3) Head-to-head goal difference; 4) Head-to-head goals scored; 5) Head-to-head away goals scored (only if two teams); 6) Goal difference; 7) Goals scored; 8) Fairplay ranking; 9) Draw.
(R) Relegated

=== Group B ===
Pos	Team	Pld	W	D	L	GF	GA	GD	Pts	Qualification or relegation	BPD	ARD	BVR	DUN
1	Botev Plovdiv	29	10	6	13	32	34	−2	36	Qualification for the European play-off quarter-finals	—	—	3–2	3–1
2	Arda	29	8	11	10	28	35	−7	35	Qualification for the European play-off quarter-finals	1–0	—	—	0–2
3	Botev Vratsa	29	6	8	15	26	50	−24	26	Qualification for the relegation play-offs	—	0–0	—	—
4	Dunav Ruse	29	5	7	17	25	55	−30	22	Qualification for the relegation play-offs	—	—	1–3	—

Source: Soccerway
Legend: Blue = home team win; Yellow = draw; Red = away team win.
Rules for classification: 1) Points; 2) Head-to-head points; 3) Head-to-head goal difference; 4) Head-to-head goals scored; 5) Head-to-head away goals scored (only if two teams); 6) Goal difference; 7) Goals scored; 8) Fairplay ranking; 9) Draw.

== European play-offs ==
=== Bracket ===
Quarter-finals
Cherno More	1
Arda	0
Botev Plovdiv	1
Etar	0

Semi-final
Cherno More	0
Botev Plovdiv	1

Final
Slavia Sofia	2
Botev Plovdiv	1

=== European play-off quarter-finals ===
7 July 2020
18:00 EEST

Cherno More	1–0	Arda
Isa 18'	Report

Stadion Ticha, Varna
Attendance: 1,200
Referee: Radoslav Gidzhenov (Plovdiv)
7 July 2020
21:00 EEST

Botev Plovdiv	1–0	Etar
Vutov 29'	Report

Futbolen kompleks Botev 1912, Plovdiv
Attendance: 900
Referee: Georgi Ivanov (Sofia)

=== European play-off semi-final ===
11 July 2020
20:00 EEST

Cherno More	0–1	Botev Plovdiv
	Report	Vutov 53'

Stadion Ticha, Varna
Attendance: 0
Referee: Nikolay Yordanov (Sofia)

=== European play-off final ===
19 July 2020
20:30 EEST

Slavia Sofia	2–1	Botev Plovdiv
Karabelyov 41'; Dimitrov 84'	Report	Anderson 88'

Stadion Slavia, Sofia
Attendance: 0
Referee: Stanislav Todorov (Shumen)

== Relegation play-offs ==
=== Relegation group ===
Pos	Team	Pld	W	D	L	GF	GA	GD	Pts	Qualification or relegation	BVR	DUN	TSS
1	Botev Vratsa	2	1	1	0	3	0	+3	4		—	0–0	—
2	Dunav Ruse (R)	2	1	1	0	1	0	+1	4	Relegation play-off against the third from the Second League	—	—	1–0
3	Tsarsko Selo (O)	2	0	0	2	0	4	−4	0	Relegation play-off against the second from the Second League	0–3	—	—

Source: Soccerway
Legend: Blue = home team win; Yellow = draw; Red = away team win.
Rules for classification: 1) Points; 2) Head-to-head points; 3) Head-to-head goal difference; 4) Head-to-head goals scored; 5) Head-to-head away goals scored (only if two teams); 6) Goal difference; 7) Goals scored; 8) Fairplay ranking; 9) Draw.
(O) Play-off winners; (R) Relegated

=== Relegation finals ===
17 July 2020
20:00 EEST

Dunav Ruse	1−4	Montana
Nando 86'	Report	Aytov 28'; Tasev 43'; Minkov 69'; A. Iliev 82'

Stadion Slavia, Sofia
Attendance: 0
Referee: Georgi Kabakov (Plovdiv)

Dunav Ruse are relegated to the Third League. (Note: Dunav Ruse withdrew from participation from Second League following ownership change and will instead enter the Third League.)

18 July 2020
20:00 EEST

Tsarsko Selo	2−0	Septemvri Sofia
Minchev 19'; Mechev 90+4'	Report

Stadion Balgarska Armia, Sofia
Attendance: 0
Referee: Nikolay Yordanov (Sofia)

== Season statistics ==
=== Top scorers ===
As of 12 July 2020

Rank	Player	Club	Goals
1	(Bulgaria) Martin Kamburov	Beroe	18
2	(Bulgaria) Ismail Isa	Cherno More	13
2	(The Gambia) Ali Sowe	CSKA Sofia	13
4	(Bulgaria) Dimitar Iliev	Lokomotiv Plovdiv	12
4	(Romania) Claudiu Keșerü	Ludogorets	12
6	(Curaçao) Nigel Robertha	Levski Sofia	11
7	(Brazil) Evandro	CSKA Sofia	10
7	(Bulgaria) Radoslav Vasilev	Arda	10
9	(Bulgaria) Todor Nedelev	Botev Plovdiv	9
9	(Bulgaria) Stanislav Ivanov	Levski Sofia	9
9	(Netherlands) Rodney Antwi	Tsarsko Selo	9

=== Hat-tricks ===
Player	For	Against	Result	Date
(Bulgaria) Todor Nedelev	Botev Plovdiv	Dunav Ruse	3–1	21 July 2019

=== Clean sheets ===
As of 12 July 2020

Rank	Player	Club	Clean sheets
1	(Brazil) Gustavo Busatto	CSKA Sofia	17
2	(Montenegro) Milan Mijatović	Levski Sofia	13
3	(Bulgaria) Martin Lukov	Lokomotiv Plovdiv	11
4	(Bulgaria) Plamen Iliev	Ludogorets	9
4	(Slovakia) Dušan Perniš	Beroe	9
6	(Bulgaria) Georgi Georgiev (Note: Includes 8 clean sheets for Slavia Sofia)	Levski Sofia	8
6	(Bulgaria) Krasimir Kostov	Botev Vratsa	8
6	(Bulgaria) Blagoy Makendzhiev	Dunav	8
6	(Switzerland) Miodrag Mitrovic	Cherno More	8

== Transfers ==
- List of Bulgarian football transfers summer 2019
- List of Bulgarian football transfers winter 2019–20

== Attendances ==
#	Football club	Home games	Average attendance
1	Levski Sofia	13	4,988
2	CSKA Sofia	13	3,196
3	Lokomotiv Plovdiv	13	2,428
4	Cherno More Varna	13	2,087
5	Botev Plovdiv	13	2,082
6	PFC Beroe	13	1,818
7	Etar Veliko Tarnovo	13	1,675
8	Ludogorets	13	1,665
9	Botev Vratsa	13	1,513
10	FC Dunav Ruse	13	1,377
11	Arda Kardzhali	13	642
12	Slavia Sofia	13	424
13	FC Tsarsko Selo Sofia	13	342
14	FC Vitosha Bistritsa	13	319
