= 2018–19 Second Professional Football League (Bulgaria) =

Second Professional Football League
- Season: 2018–19
- Champions: Tsarsko Selo
- Promoted: Tsarsko Selo; Arda
- Relegated: Dobrudzha; Nesebar
- Matches: 240
- Goals: 567 (2.36 per match)
- Top goalscorer: (Bulgaria) Georgi Minchev (29 goals)
- Longest winning run: 14 games by Tsarsko Selo
- Longest unbeaten run: 20 games by Montana and Tsarsko Selo
- Longest winless run: 18 games by Dobrudzha
- Longest losing run: 5 games by Ludogorets II
- All statistics correct as of 29 May 2019.

The 2018–19 Second League was the 63rd season of the Second League, the second tier of the Bulgarian football league system, and the 3rd season under this name and current league structure. In June 2018, the Executive Committee of the Bulgarian Football Union decided to increase the participating teams to 18 for the 2019–20 season; as a result, only two teams will be relegated to Third League. The fixture list was released on 8 June 2018. The participating teams were confirmed on the same day. FC Tsarsko Selo Sofia became champions of the second league and were promoted directly to the first division. FC Dobrudzha Dobrich and PFC Nesebar were relegated.

== Teams ==
The following teams have changed division since the 2017–18 season.

=== To Second League ===
Promoted from Third League

- Dobrudzha Dobrich
- Arda
- Kariana
- CSKA 1948

Relegated from First League

- Pirin Blagoevgrad

=== From Second League ===
Relegated to Third League

- Neftochimic
- Sozopol
- Maritsa Plovdiv
- Oborishte

Promoted to First League

- Botev Vratsa

== Stadia and locations ==
Location of teams in 2018–19 Second League
Sofia 2018–19 Second League football clubs

Team	City	Stadium	Capacity
Arda	Kardzhali	Druzhba	15,000
Botev	Galabovo	Energetik	3,000
Chernomorets	Balchik	Gradski, Balchik	3,100
CSKA 1948	Sofia	Vasil Levski National Stadium	43,230
Dobrudzha	Dobrich	Druzhba	12,500
Kariana	Erden	Sport Complex Kariana	1,000
Litex	Lovech	Gradski, Lovech	8,100
Lokomotiv	Gorna Oryahovitsa	Lokomotiv, Gorna Oryahovitsa	10,500
Lokomotiv	Sofia	Lokomotiv, Sofia	22,000
Ludogorets II	Razgrad	Eagles' Nest	2,000
Montana	Montana	Ogosta	8,000
Nesebar	Nesebar	Nesebar	7,000
Pirin	Blagoevgrad	Hristo Botev	7,500
Pomorie	Pomorie	Pomorie	2,000
Strumska Slava	Radomir	Gradski, Radomir	3,500
Tsarsko Selo	Sofia	Tsarsko Selo Sports Complex	2,000

== Personnel and sponsorship ==
Note: Flags indicate national team as has been defined under FIFA eligibility rules. Players and managers may hold more than one non-FIFA nationality.

Team	Manager	Captain	Kit manufacturer	Shirt sponsor	Kit sponsor
Arda	(Bulgaria) Stamen Belchev	(Bulgaria) Borislav Stoychev	Nike	—	—
Botev Galabovo	(Bulgaria) Gospodin Mirchev	(Bulgaria) Nikolay Yankov	KRASIKO	Galabovo Municipality	Knauf
Chernomorets Balchik	(Bulgaria) Georgi Ivanov	(Bulgaria) Genadi Lugo	Legea	Balchik Municipality	—
CSKA 1948	(Bulgaria) Petko Petkov	(Bulgaria) Evgeni Zyumbulev	Errea	Efbet	—
Dobrudzha Dobrich	(Bulgaria) Emil Velev	(Bulgaria) Daniel Gramatikov	KRASIKO	Albena Resort	Pioneer Seeds, Izida
Kariana	(Bulgaria) Veselin Velikov	(Bulgaria) Evgeni Ignatov	Joma	Upgrade	—
Litex	(Bulgaria) Zhivko Zhelev	(Bulgaria) Plamen Nikolov	adidas	—	—
Lokomotiv Sofia	(Serbia) Mladen Dodić	(Bulgaria) Vladislav Romanov	Joma	Efbet	Malizia, Intesa, VIA 2000
Lokomotiv Gorna Oryahovitsa	(Bulgaria) Krasimir Mechev	(Bulgaria) Krasen Trifonov	KRASIKO	Efbet	Prity, Enel, Go Grill
Ludogorets Razgrad II	(Bulgaria) Radoslav Zdravkov	(Bulgaria) Oleg Dimitrov	Umbro	Efbet	Vivacom, Spetema
Montana	(Bulgaria) Ferario Spasov	(Bulgaria) Ivan Mihov	Jako	Efbet	—
Nesebar	(Bulgaria) Nikolay Zhechev	(Bulgaria) Nikolay Kostov	Joma	Nesebar Municipality	Efbet
Pirin Blagoevgrad	(Bulgaria) Petar Zlatinov	(Bulgaria) Yulian Popev	Erreà	Katarino Spa	—
Pomorie	(Bulgaria) Radoslav Boyanov	(Bulgaria) Georgi Petkov	Joma	Efbet	—
Strumska Slava	(Bulgaria) Vladimir Dimitrov	(Bulgaria) Todor Zyumbulev	Jumper	Efbet	—
Tsarsko Selo	(Bulgaria) Nikola Spasov	(Bulgaria) Simeon Ganchev	Nike	Winbet	—

Note: Individual clubs may wear jerseys with advertising. However, only one sponsorship is permitted per jersey for official tournaments organised by UEFA in addition to that of the kit manufacturer (exceptions are made for non-profit organisations). Clubs in the domestic league can have more than one sponsorship per jersey which can feature on the front of the shirt, incorporated with the main sponsor or in place of it; or on the back, either below the squad number or on the collar area. Shorts also have space available for advertisement.

== Managerial changes ==
Team	Outgoing manager	Manner of departure	Date of vacancy	Position in table	Incoming manager	Date of appointment
Lokomotiv GO	(Bulgaria) Aleksandar Dimitrov	End of contract	23 May 2018	Pre-season	(Bulgaria) Todor Kiselichkov	10 June 2018
Tsarsko Selo	(Bulgaria) Velislav Vutsov	Mutual consent	1 June 2018	Pre-season	(Bulgaria) Nikola Spasov	1 June 2018
Pomorie	(Bulgaria) Veselin Branimirov	Signed by (Latvia) Riga	12 June 2018	Pre-season	(Bulgaria) Radoslav Boyanov	22 June 2018
Lokomotiv Sofia	(Serbia) Mladen Dodić	End of contract	14 June 2018	Pre-season	(Bulgaria) Angel Kolev	14 June 2018
Pirin Blagoevgrad	(Bulgaria) Milen Radukanov	End of contract	19 June 2018	Pre-season	(Bulgaria) Petar Zlatinov	20 June 2018
CSKA 1948	(Bulgaria) Valentin Iliev	Mutual consent	21 August 2018	4th	(Bulgaria) Petko Petkov	24 August 2018
Kariana	(Bulgaria) Atanas Dzhambazki	Sacked	21 August 2018	14th	(Bulgaria) Veselin Velikov	26 August 2018
Arda	(Bulgaria) Elin Topuzakov	Sacked	26 August 2018	7th	(Bulgaria) Stoycho Stoev	26 August 2018
Lokomotiv GO	(Bulgaria) Todor Kiselichkov	Mutual consent	18 September 2018	16th	(Bulgaria) Marin Baichev (caretaker)	11 October 2018
Botev Galabovo	(Bulgaria) Lyudmil Kirov	Signed by Vereya	27 September 2018	4th	(Bulgaria) Gospodin Mirchev	27 September 2018
Dobrudzha	(Bulgaria) Diyan Bozhilov	Mutual consent	6 November 2018	16th	(Bulgaria) Emil Velev	13 November 2018
Lokomotiv GO	(Bulgaria) Marin Baichev (caretaker)	Caretaking spell over	13 December 2018	9th	(Bulgaria) Krasimir Mechev	13 December 2018
Lokomotiv Sofia	(Bulgaria) Angel Kolev	Mutual consent	17 December 2018	11th	(Serbia) Mladen Dodić	17 December 2018
Arda	(Bulgaria) Stoycho Stoev	Signed by Ludogorets	6 March 2019	3rd	(Bulgaria) Stamen Belchev	6 March 2019

== League table ==
Pos	Team	Pld	W	D	L	GF	GA	GD	Pts	Promotion, qualification or relegation
1	Tsarsko Selo (C, P)	30	24	4	2	68	27	+41	76	Promotion to the First League
2	Montana	30	18	9	3	49	22	+27	63	Qualification for the promotion play-offs
3	Arda (P)	30	19	5	6	44	18	+26	62	Qualification for the promotion play-offs
4	CSKA 1948	30	16	11	3	39	18	+21	59	
5	Litex	30	12	9	9	43	26	+17	45	
6	Strumska Slava Radomir	30	10	7	13	36	44	−8	37 (Note: Strumska Slava Radomir is ahead of Chernomorets Balchik on head-to-head points: Strumska Slava–Chernomorets Balchik 1–0, Chernomorets Balchik–Strumska Slava 2–1.)	
7	Chernomorets Balchik	30	10	7	13	27	35	−8	37	
8	Lokomotiv Sofia	30	9	9	12	25	28	−3	36 (Note: Lokomotiv Sofia is ahead of Lokomotiv Gorna Oryahovitsa and Pomorie on head-to-head points: Lokomotiv Sofia 8 pts, Lokomotiv Gorna Oryahovitsa 6 pts, Pomorie 2 pts.)	
9	Lokomotiv Gorna Oryahovitsa	30	10	6	14	30	43	−13	36	
10	Pomorie	30	10	6	14	35	49	−14	36	
11	Ludogorets Razgrad II	30	9	5	16	31	43	−12	32	Ineligible for promotion
12	Kariana	30	8	7	15	29	38	−9	31 (Note: Kariana is ahead of Pirin Blagoevgrad and Botev Galabovo on head-to-head points: Kariana 9 pts, Pirin Blagoevgrad 4 pts, Botev Galabovo 4 pts.)	
13	Pirin Blagoevgrad	30	9	4	17	29	49	−20	31	
14	Botev Galabovo	30	7	10	13	32	38	−6	31	
15	Nesebar (R)	30	6	9	15	33	51	−18	27	Relegation to the Third League
16	Dobrudzha Dobrich (R)	30	4	10	16	17	38	−21	22	Relegation to the Third League

Source: bulgarian-football.com
Rules for classification: 1) Points; 2) Head-to-head points; 3) Head-to-head goal difference; 4) Head-to-head goals scored; 5) Head-to-head away goals scored (only if two teams); 6) Goal difference; 7) Goals scored; 8) Fairplay ranking; 9) Draw.
(C) Champions; (P) Promoted; (R) Relegated

== Results ==
Home \ Away	ARD	GAL	CBA	CSK	DOB	KAR	LIT	LGO	LSO	LUD	MON	NES	PIR	POM	STR	TSS
Arda	—	2–1	1–0	1–0	1–0	2–0	1–0	3–0	2–0	0–1	2–0	5–1	2–0	2–0	1–1	0–1
Botev Galabovo	2–3	—	3–1	1–1	0–0	3–1	2–1	0–0	0–0	0–1	0–1	2–0	3–3	4–1	0–0	3–2
Chernomorets Balchik	1–3	1–0	—	0–0	3–0	0–0	2–2	1–2	1–0	1–0	0–0	2–1	2–1	0–3	2–1	1–3
CSKA 1948	0–0	0–0	2–1	—	0–0	2–1	1–0	4–0	3–1	0–0	1–1	2–0	2–1	1–2	3–0	1–1
Dobrudzha Dobrich	0–2	1–0	0–1	0–0	—	0–1	0–0	0–0	1–1	1–3	0–0	1–0	1–2	2–0	1–2	0–2
Kariana	0–1	3–0	0–0	0–1	2–0	—	1–1	0–2	0–2	3–0	0–0	2–0	2–1	2–0	1–2	1–2
Litex	2–0	2–0	3–0	1–0	2–2	1–1	—	0–1	0–0	2–0	1–2	3–0	3–1	3–0	2–0	2–3
Lokomotiv GO	2–0	1–2	1–2	0–1	1–1	3–2	1–2	—	0–2	1–0	1–1	1–1	0–2	3–2	1–0	0–1
Lokomotiv Sofia	0–3	1–0	0–0	0–1	2–0	2–0	1–1	4–1	—	1–0	0–1	0–0	0–2	1–1	0–1	0–1
Ludogorets Razgrad II	0–1	2–0	0–2	0–1	1–1	4–0	0–0	3–2	0–3	—	1–3	4–1	0–0	2–2	3–1	0–2
Montana	0–0	2–2	1–0	2–2	1–2	2–1	2–1	4–1	3–0	2–0	—	3–1	2–0	1–0	3–1	2–0
Nesebar	2–1	0–0	0–0	0–2	3–1	1–1	0–0	2–1	3–0	4–2	1–2	—	2–3	1–1	0–0	0–2
Pirin Blagoevgrad	0–0	2–1	2–1	1–2	1–0	1–2	0–5	0–0	0–2	1–0	0–3	1–3	—	0–2	3–0	1–3
Pomorie	1–1	2–2	1–0	1–2	1–0	1–0	2–1	1–2	0–0	2–1	1–3	4–3	1–0	—	0–2	2–5
Strumska Slava	1–3	1–0	1–0	3–4	3–1	3–1	0–1	0–1	1–1	2–3	2–2	2–2	2–0	1–0	—	2–2
Tsarsko Selo	2–1	3–1	4–2	0–0	3–1	1–1	3–1	2–1	2–1	4–0	1–0	3–1	3–0	4–1	3–1	—

Source: bulgarian-football.com
Legend: Blue = home team win; Yellow = draw; Red = away team win.
For upcoming matches, an "a" indicates there is an article about the rivalry between the two participants.

=== Positions by round ===
Team ╲ Round	1	2	3	4	5	6	7	8	9	10	11	12	13	14	15	16	17	18	19	20	21	22	23	24	25	26	27	28	29	30
Tsarsko Selo	2	1	1	1	1	1	1	1	1	1	1	1	1	1	1	1	1	1	1	1	1	1	1	1	1	1	1	1	1	1
Montana	8	6	5	7	4	5	2	2	2	2	2	2	2	2	2	2	2	2	2	2	2	2	2	2	3	3	2	2	2	2
Arda	3	4	8	6	8	4	3	3	3	3	3	4	4	4	4	3	3	3	3	3	4	4	3	3	2	2	3	3	3	3
CSKA 1948	9	3	2	4	2	2	6	7	4	5	4	5	3	3	3	4	4	4	4	4	3	3	4	4	4	4	4	4	4	4
Litex	12	15	11	12	14	9	7	6	7	8	6	6	6	6	6	6	5	6	5	5	5	5	5	5	5	5	5	5	5	5
Strumska Slava	5	5	3	2	3	3	8	8	10	10	13	12	12	11	13	10	12	10	9	10	10	10	10	10	10	8	8	8	7	6
Chernomorets	11	12	15	10	6	8	10	11	9	11	7	8	7	8	8	7	7	7	7	6	7	7	8	9	9	10	10	10	10	7
Lokomotiv Sofia	10	13	9	8	13	12	13	14	11	12	11	9	9	7	7	9	11	8	8	8	9	9	9	8	8	9	9	9	8	8
Lokomotiv GO	7	14	14	15	12	14	16	12	8	7	9	11	11	13	11	13	9	9	11	9	8	8	7	7	7	6	6	6	6	9
Pomorie	15	10	4	3	5	7	4	5	5	4	5	3	5	5	5	5	6	5	6	7	6	6	6	6	6	7	7	7	9	10
Ludogorets II	16	11	13	14	15	16	14	16	15	14	14	14	10	12	12	8	10	13	13	13	14	14	14	14	14	12	11	11	11	11
Kariana	14	16	16	16	16	15	15	15	16	16	16	15	14	14	15	15	15	15	15	15	13	12	13	13	12	13	14	14	13	12
Pirin	4	8	12	13	10	11	9	9	13	13	12	13	15	15	14	14	14	14	14	14	15	15	15	15	15	15	13	13	14	13
Botev Galabovo	6	2	6	5	7	6	5	4	6	6	8	7	11	9	9	11	13	11	12	11	11	11	11	11	11	11	12	12	12	14
Nesebar	1	7	10	11	9	13	12	13	12	9	10	10	8	10	10	12	8	12	10	12	12	13	12	12	13	14	15	15	15	15
Dobrudzha	13	9	7	9	11	10	11	10	14	15	15	16	16	16	16	16	16	16	16	16	16	16	16	16	16	16	16	16	16	16

Updated to match(es) played on 23 May 2019. Source: bulgarian-football.com

== Top scorers ==
As of match(es) played on 23 May 2019

Rank	Player	Club	Goals
1	(Bulgaria) Georgi Minchev	Tsarsko Selo	29
2	(Bulgaria) Andon Gushterov	CSKA 1948	20
3	(Bulgaria) Atanas Iliev	Montana	18
4	(Bulgaria) Ventsislav Hristov	Arda	12
4	(Bulgaria) Denislav Aleksandrov (Note: Includes 6 goals for Ludogorets Razgrad II)	CSKA 1948	12
4	(Bulgaria) Vladislav Zlatinov	Pirin Blagoevgrad	12
