= Antonio Georgiev =

Bulgarian footballer

Personal information
- Full name: Antonio Georgiev Georgiev
- Date of birth: 26 October 1997 (age 29)
- Place of birth: Yambol, Bulgaria
- Height: 1.80 m (5 ft 11 in)
- Position: Defensive midfielder

Team information
- Current team: Spartak Pleven
- Number: 29

Youth career
- –2015: Ludogorets Razgrad

Senior career*
| Years | Team | Apps | (Gls) |
| 2015–2017 | Ludogorets Razgrad II | 43 | (2) |
| 2017 | Botev Galabovo | 17 | (2) |
| 2018–2021 | Tsarsko Selo | 83 | (8) |
| 2021–2023 | Botev Vratsa | 48 | (2) |
| 2023–2024 | Gloria Buzău | 9 | (0) |
| 2025 | Etar | 0 | (0) |
| 2026– | Spartak Pleven | 4 | (0) |

International career
| 2015–2016 | Bulgaria U19 | 8 | (1) |
| 2017–2018 | Bulgaria U21 | 9 | (0) |
- * Club domestic league appearances and goals as of 25 October 2026

Antonio Georgiev Georgiev (Bulgarian: Антонио Георгиев Георгиев; born 26 October 1997) is a Bulgarian professional footballer who plays as a midfielder for Spartak Pleven. He has represented Bulgaria at U-19 and U-21 level.

== Honours ==
Tsarsko Selo

- Second Professional Football League: 2018–19
