= FC Tsarsko Selo Sofia =

Bulgarian football club

Tsarsko Selo
- Full name: Association Football Club Tsarsko Selo 2015
- Nickname(s): Царете (The Tsars)
- Founded: 1 July 2015; 9 years ago
- Dissolved: 22 May 2022; 2 years ago
- Ground: Arena Tsarsko Selo
- Capacity: 1,550
- Coordinates: 42°38′11.9″N 23°18′57.5″E
- 2021–22: First League, 14th of 14 (Relegated)
- Website: https://fctsarskoselo.com/
Home colours	Away colours	Third colours

Association Football Club Tsarsko Selo 2015 (Bulgarian: Сдружение Футболен Клуб Царско Село 2015), commonly referred to as Tsarsko Selo, was a Bulgarian association football club based in Sofia. It played in First League, the top tier of Bulgarian football league system.

Tsarsko Selo played their home matches at their Tsarsko Selo Sports Complex in the Dragalevtsi quarter of Sofia.

== History ==
=== 2015–2016: Foundation ===
In the summer of 2015, the previous chairman of CSKA Sofia Stoyne Manolov established a new academy called Football Academy Tsarsko Selo, with a focus on scouting and developing youth football players born in 2002 to 2010. The club was initially registered and a subsequent men's team in the A RFG Sofia South was established, with former long-time CSKA Sofia captain Todor Yanchev appointed as manager. On November 12, 2015, Manolov announced an academy partnership with Spanish La Liga club Málaga CF. In the end of December 2015, Todor Yanchev took over Sofia 2010, which was bought by Manolov and was merged with Tsarsko Selo to establish a new club called Tsarsko Selo Sofia.

=== 2016–2022: Professional levels ===
On 28 July 2016 the team was accepted in the newly created Bulgarian Second Professional League. They finished their first match against Botev Galabovo with a draw. In their first match for the Bulgarian Cup they played against Levski Sofia. The match was played on 22 September 2016 at the Lokomotiv Stadium in Sofia and was won by Levski by 2–0. After 2 heavy defeats, Yanchev stepped down from his position as a manager and on 29 October 2016, previous Cherno More Varna head coach Nikola Spasov was announced as the new manager of the team. The team finished their first season in Second League in 5th place.

The good start of the season for Tsarsko Selo was marked not only by the first place in the league after 8 rounds, but with their first win for the Cup, winning the first round against Neftochimic Burgas on 19 September 2017. On 3 January 2018 Nikola Spasov was announced as the new manager of the Kazakhstan Premier League team Kyzylzhar. Shortly the same day Veselin Velikov was announced as the new manager of the club. On 8 May 2018 Velislav Vutsov was announced as the new head coach of the team with Velikov becoming a selectionist.

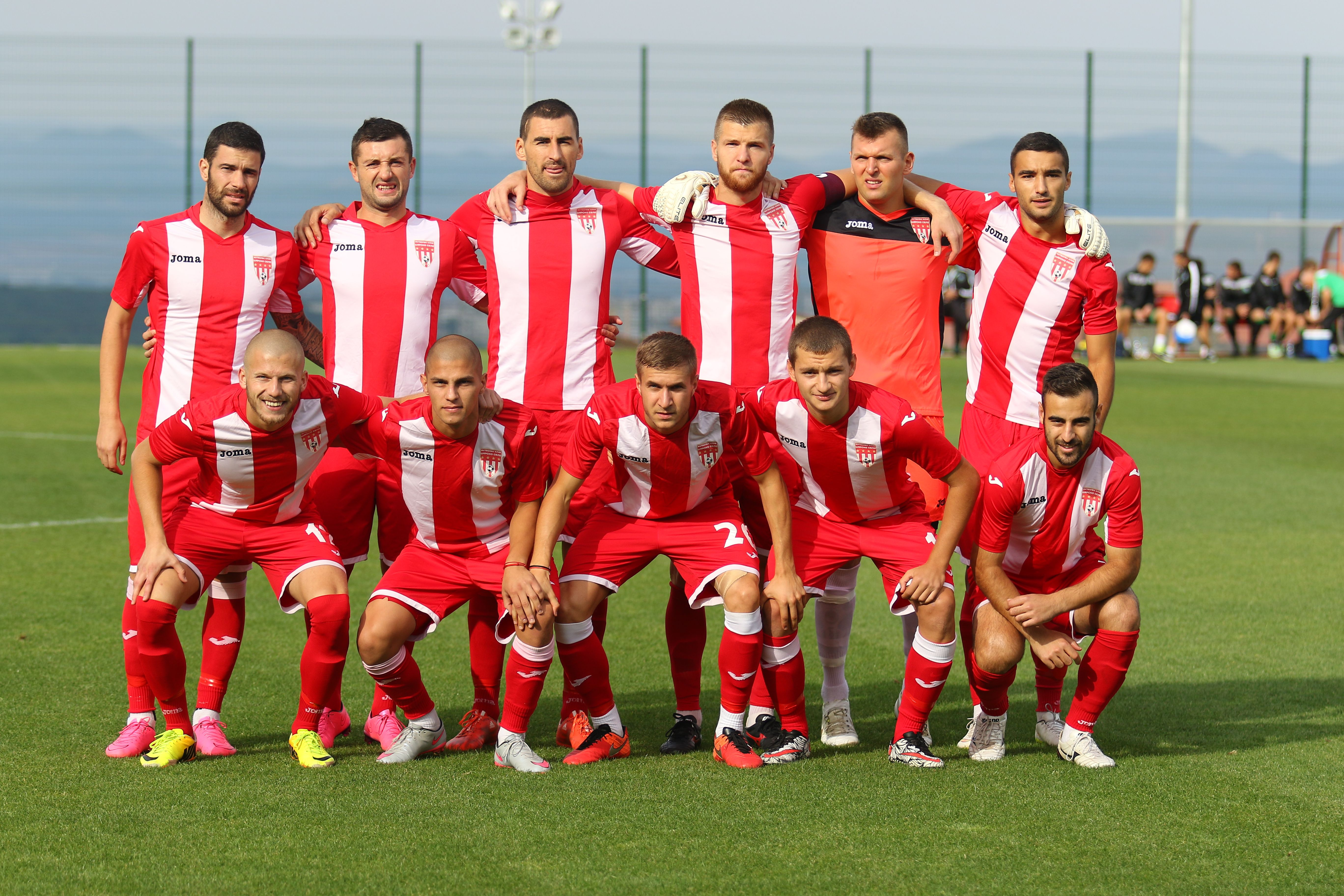

On 22 April 2019 in a goalless draw against CSKA 1948 the kings secured their first place in Second League and won promotion in the First League for first time in their history, being 18 points ahead from the second and third place five rounds before the end of the season.

Tsarsko Selo's first ever match in the Bulgarian First Division resulted in a 0–2 away loss against the actual champion Ludogorets Razgrad. This was followed by a home 0–0 draw to the other debutant Arda Kardzhali. Tsarsko selo's first win came in the fifth round, when the team managed to beat Botev Plovdiv away with 0–2. Two goals for the win were scored by Dutch winger Rodney Antwi. The first home win came in the seventh round with 2–1 against Beroe Stara Zagora. Tsarsko Selo eventually finished 13th, having to play a playoff match in order to remain in the elite. They were drawn against the second-placed team from the Second League, Septemvri Sofia. In a very close fought game played in Sofia, Tsarsko Selo won 2–0, securing their place in the First League for the next season.

In January 2022 an Italian Private Investment company joined the club leadership. On 21 May 2022, in the last match of the season, Tsarsko Selo were awarded a penalty that could secure them the win. Yusupha Yaffa decided to take the penalty despite Martin Kavdanski being the regular penalty taker. Yaffa was ready to take the penalty when the owner of the team, Stoyne Manolov, entered the pitch and fought with him. He left the pitch and Kavdanski took the penalty, but it was saved. On the next day, Manolov announced that the team won't be participating in the league next season and will end their existence.

== Honours ==
- First League:
  - Ninth Place: 2020–21
- Bulgarian Cup:
  - Round of 16 (2): 2017–18, 2020–21
- Second League:
  - Winners (1): 2018–19
  - Third Place (1): 2017–18
- Regional League:
  - Runners up (1): 2015–16

== Shirt and sponsor ==
Tsarsko Selo's main kit was initially red and white and the away kits were black and red. From 2016, the main kit has been all-red, while the reserve ones are all-white. In 2017 team main kit was changed to pink.

Period	Kit manufacturer	Shirt partner
2015–2017	(Spain) Joma	None
2017–2019	(United States) Nike	None
2019–2022	(United States) Nike	WINBET

== Records and notable stats ==
As of 22 May 2022

**Most appearances for the club in league**

Rank	Name	Career	Appearances
1	(Bulgaria) Reyan Daskalov	2016–2021	124
2	(Bulgaria) Georgi Minchev	2017–2020	87
3	(Bulgaria) Antonio Georgiev	2018–2021	83
4	(Bulgaria) Bozhidar Katsarov	2017–2019	78
5	(Bulgaria) Ivaylo Markov	2018–2021	68
6	(Bulgaria) Martin Kavdanski	2019–2022	74
7	(Bulgaria) Georgi Hashev	2017–2019	56
8	(Brazil) Anderson	2017–2022	50
9	(Haiti) Johny Placide	2019–2021	47
10	(Bulgaria) Svetoslav Dikov	2017–2018; 2019	43

**Most goals for the club in league**

Rank	Name	Career	Goals
1	(Bulgaria) Georgi Minchev	2017–2020	40
2	(Bulgaria) Svetoslav Dikov	2017–2018; 2019	33
3	(Bulgaria) Pavel Petkov	2017–2018	17
4	(Bulgaria) Simeon Ganchev	2016–2018	13
5	(Bulgaria) Bozhidar Katsarov	2017–2019	11
6	(Netherlands) Rodney Antwi	2019–2020	9
7	(Bulgaria) Antonio Georgiev	2018–2021	8
8	(Brazil) Anderson	2017–2022	8
9	(Bulgaria) Reyan Daskalov	2016–2021	7
10	(Bulgaria) Martin Kavdanski	2019–2022	5

- Players in **bold** are still playing for Tsarsko Selo.

== Notable players ==
The footballers enlisted below have international caps for their respective countries, have more than 100 caps, or hold a record for Tsarsko Selo. Players whose name is listed in bold represented their countries.

Bulgaria

- (Bulgaria) **Lachezar Baltanov**
- (Bulgaria) **Ivan Bandalovski**
- (Bulgaria) **Ivan Čvorović**
- (Bulgaria) Reyan Daskalov
- (Bulgaria) Svetoslav Dikov
- (Bulgaria) **Boris Galchev**
- (Bulgaria) Antonio Georgiev
- (Bulgaria) **Ventsislav Hristov**
- (Bulgaria) **Mihail Ivanov**
- (Bulgaria) **Yanis Karabelyov**
- (Bulgaria) **Ivaylo Markov**
- (Bulgaria) **Georgi Minchev**
- (Bulgaria) **Veselin Minev**
- (Bulgaria) **Yordan Minev**
- (Bulgaria) **Boyan Peykov**
- (Bulgaria) **Ventsislav Vasilev**

Europe

- (Moldova) **Artur Crăciun**
- (Netherlands) Rodney Antwi
- (Netherlands) Dylan Mertens
- (Serbia) **Alen Stevanović**

Africa

- (Republic of the Congo) **Dylan Bahamboula**
- (Gabon) **Gaëtan Missi Mezu**
- (Morocco) **Yassine Amrioui**

The Americas

- (Brazil) Wesley Natã
- (Haiti) **Johny Placide**

== Past seasons ==
Results of league and cup competitions by season
Season	League											Bulgarian Cup	Other competitions	Top goalscorer	
Season	Division	Level	P	W	D	L	F	A	GD	Pts	Pos	Bulgarian Cup	Other competitions	Top goalscorer	
2015–16	A Regional League	4	26	20	1	5	92	21	+71	61	2nd ↑	Not qualified			
2016–17	Second League	2	30	14	6	10	54	39	+15	48	5th	First Round		(Bulgaria) Simeon Ganchev	13
2017–18	Second League	2	30	19	6	5	56	28	+28	63	3rd	Second Round		(Bulgaria) Svetoslav Dikov	25
2018–19	Second League	2	30	24	4	2	68	27	+51	76	1st ↑	First Round		(Bulgaria) Georgi Minchev	29
2019–20	First League	1	31	9	4	18	27	50	–23	31	13th	First Round		(Netherlands) Rodney Antwi	9
2020–21	First League	1	32	9	10	13	33	39	–6	37	9th	Second Round		(Brazil) Anderson	7
2021–22	First League	1	32	5	11	16	22	38	–16	26	14th	First Round		(Bulgaria) Ventsislav Hristov	6

Key

Champions	Runners-up	Promoted	Relegated

== Manager history ==
Name	Nat	From	To	Honours
Todor Yanchev	(Bulgaria)	28 December 2015	29 October 2016	
Nikola Spasov	(Bulgaria)	29 October 2016	3 January 2018	
Veselin Velikov	(Bulgaria)	3 January 2018	8 May 2018	
Velislav Vutsov	(Bulgaria)	8 May 2018	1 June 2018	
Nikola Spasov	(Bulgaria)	1 June 2018	1 April 2020	1 Second League title
Vladimir Vutov	(Bulgaria)	4 April 2020	30 April 2020	
Lyuboslav Penev	(Bulgaria)	30 April 2020	28 March 2021	
Antoni Zdravkov	(Bulgaria)	29 March 2021	8 October 2021	
Lyuboslav Penev	(Bulgaria)	13 October 2021	1 January 2022	
Vladimir Vutov (interim)	(Bulgaria)	7 January 2022	27 January 2022	
Andrea Sassarini	(Italy)	27 January 2022	5 March 2022	
Stefano Maccoppi	(Italy)	5 March 2022	22 May 2022	
