= Rodney Antwi =

Dutch footballer (born 1995)

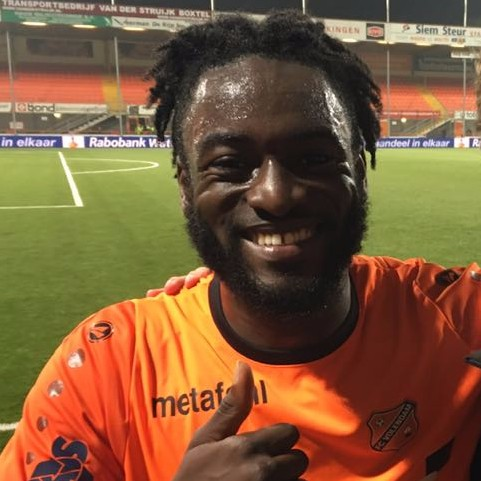

Personal information
- Full name: Rodney Akowuah Antwi
- Date of birth: 3 November 1995 (age 31)
- Place of birth: Amsterdam, Netherlands
- Height: 1.77 m (5 ft 9 1/2 in)
- Position: Winger

Team information
- Current team: Foshan Nanshi
- Number: 44

Youth career
- De Volewijckers
- Utrecht

Senior career*
Years	Team	Apps	(Gls)
2014–2016	Utrecht	4	(1)
2016	Jong FC Utrecht	14	(1)
2017–2019	Volendam	61	(9)
2019–2020	Tsarsko Selo Sofia	20	(9)
2020	→ Wadi Degla (loan)	2	(0)
2020–2021	Wadi Degla	13	(0)
2022	Inhulets Petrove	0	(0)
2022	→ Jerv (loan)	8	(0)
2022–2023	Spartak Varna	16	(1)
2023–2024	Hibernians FC	24	(3)
2024–2025	Novi Pazar	30	(8)
2025–	Foshan Nanshi	24	(8)
- * Club domestic league appearances and goals as of 30 May 2026

Rodney Akowuah Antwi (born 3 November 1995) is a Dutch professional footballer who plays as a winger for Foshan Nanshi. Besides the Netherlands, he has played in Bulgaria, Egypt, Malta and Serbia.

== Club career ==
Antwi is a youth exponent from FC Utrecht. He made his Eredivisie debut at 17 August 2014 in a 2–1 home win against Willem II. One week later, he scored his first goal against Feyenoord Rotterdam in a 1–2 away win. In the summer of 2019 he signed with newly promoted Bulgarian First League team Tsarsko Selo Sofia. On 26 July, he scored the historic first ever goal for the team in the top division of Bulgarian football, in the 1:3 loss against Dunav Ruse. On 10 August, he also netted the two goals for the 2:0 victory against Botev Plovdiv, the first win in the top flight for the club.

On 19 September 2022 he returned to Bulgaria, but this time joined Spartak Varna.

On Sep 4, 2023 he went on a new adventure and joined the historic club from Malta Hibernians FC.

== Career statistics ==
=== Club ===
As of match played 24 October 2026

Appearances and goals by club, season and competition
Club	Season	League			National cup		Continental		Other		Total	
Club	Season	Division	Apps	Goals	Apps	Goals	Apps	Goals	Apps	Goals	Apps	Goals
Utrecht	2014–15	Eredivisie	4	1	1	0	—		—		5	1
Utrecht	2015–16	Eredivisie	0	0	0	0	—		—		0	0
Utrecht	Total		4	1	1	0	—		—		5	1
Volendam	2016–17	Eerste Divisie	5	0	—		—		2	0	7	0
Volendam	2017–18	Eerste Divisie	28	6	1	0	—		—		29	6
Volendam	2018–19	Eerste Divisie	28	3	1	0	—		—		29	3
Volendam	Total		61	9	2	0	—		2	0	65	9
Tsarsko Selo Sofia	2019–20	Bulgarian First League	20	9	1	0	—		—		21	9
Wadi Degla (loan)	2019–20	Egyptian Premier League	2	0	1	0	—		—		3	0
Wadi Degla	2020–21	Egyptian Premier League	13	0	1	1	—		—		14	1
Jerv (loan)	2022	Eliteserien	8	0	1	0	—		—		9	0
Spartak Varna	2022–23	Bulgarian First League	16	1	3	1	—		—		19	2
Hibernians FC	2023–24	Maltese Premier League	24	3	1	0	—		—		25	3
Novi Pazar	2024–25	Serbian SuperLiga	30	8	3	0	—		—		33	8
Foshan Nanshi	2025	China League One	14	6	—		—		—		14	6
Foshan Nanshi	2026	China League One	23	5	0	0	—		—		23	5
Foshan Nanshi	Total		37	11	0	0	—		—		37	11
Career total			215	42	14	2	0	0	2	0	231	44
