= Bozhidar Katsarov =

Bulgarian footballer

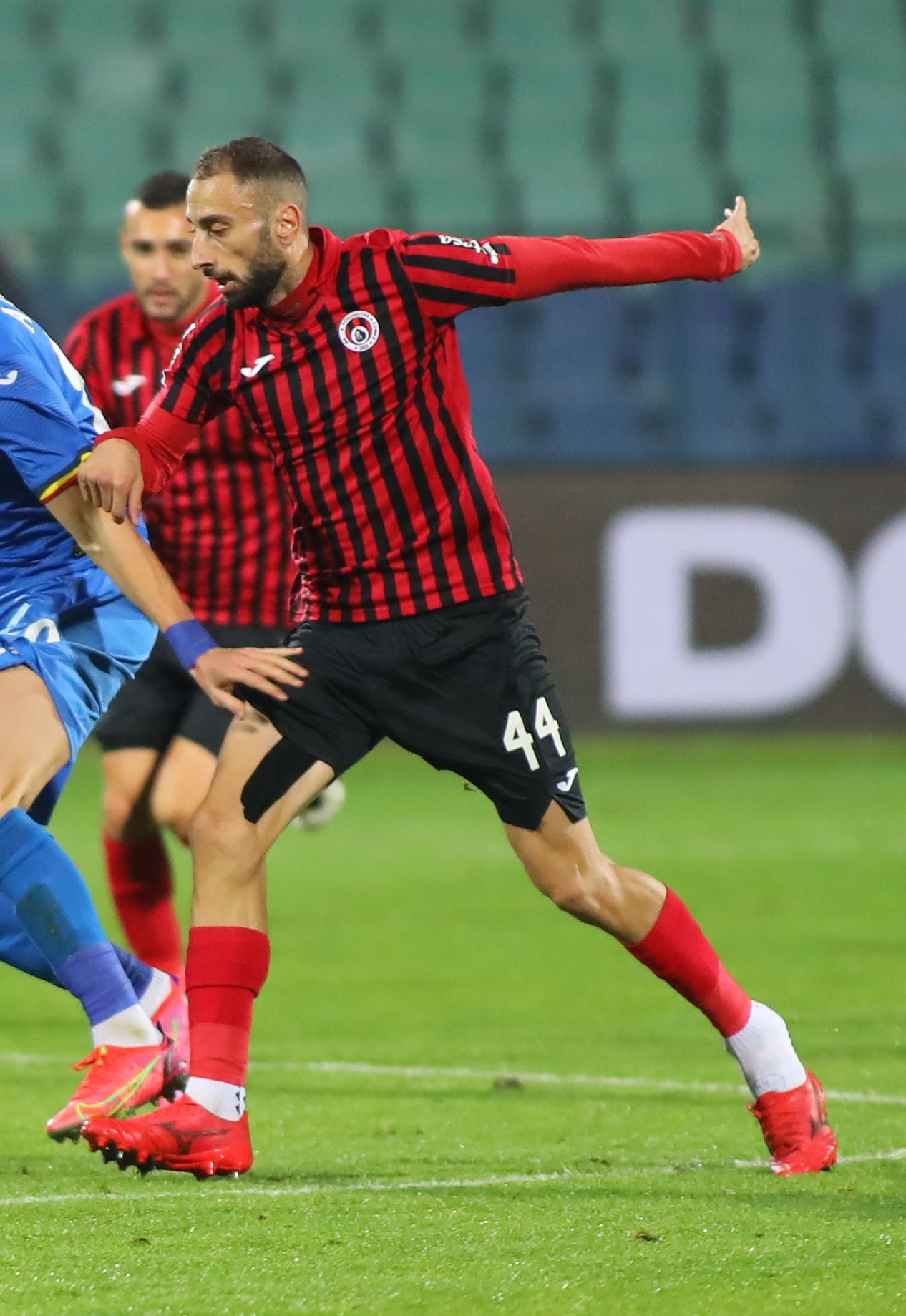

Personal information
- Full name: Bozhidar Ivanov Katsarov
- Date of birth: 30 December 1993 (age 32)
- Place of birth: Stara Zagora, Bulgaria
- Height: 1.90 m (6 ft 3 in)
- Position: Defensive midfielder

Team information
- Current team: Lokomotiv Sofia
- Number: 44

Senior career*
Years	Team	Apps	(Gls)
2014–2015	Zagorets	32	(6)
2016	Pirin Razlog	11	(2)
2016	Septemvri Sofia	14	(0)
2017–2019	Tsarsko Selo	78	(11)
2020–2021	Etar	35	(0)
2021–2023	Lokomotiv Sofia	60	(1)
2023–2024	Krumovgrad	47	(4)
2025–	Lokomotiv Sofia	46	(2)
- * Club domestic league appearances and goals as of 11 June 2026

Bozhidar Ivanov Katsarov (Bulgarian: Божидар Иванов Кацаров; born 30 December 1993) is a Bulgarian professional footballer who plays as a midfielder for First League club Lokomotiv Sofia.

In June 2023, Katsarov joined newly promoted Krumovgrad. On 14 July 2023, he scored the historic first ever goal for Krumovgrad in the top flight of Bulgarian football, contributing to the 3–1 win over reigning champions Ludogorets Razgrad in the opening round of the season.
