= Veselin Velikov =

Bulgarian footballer and manager

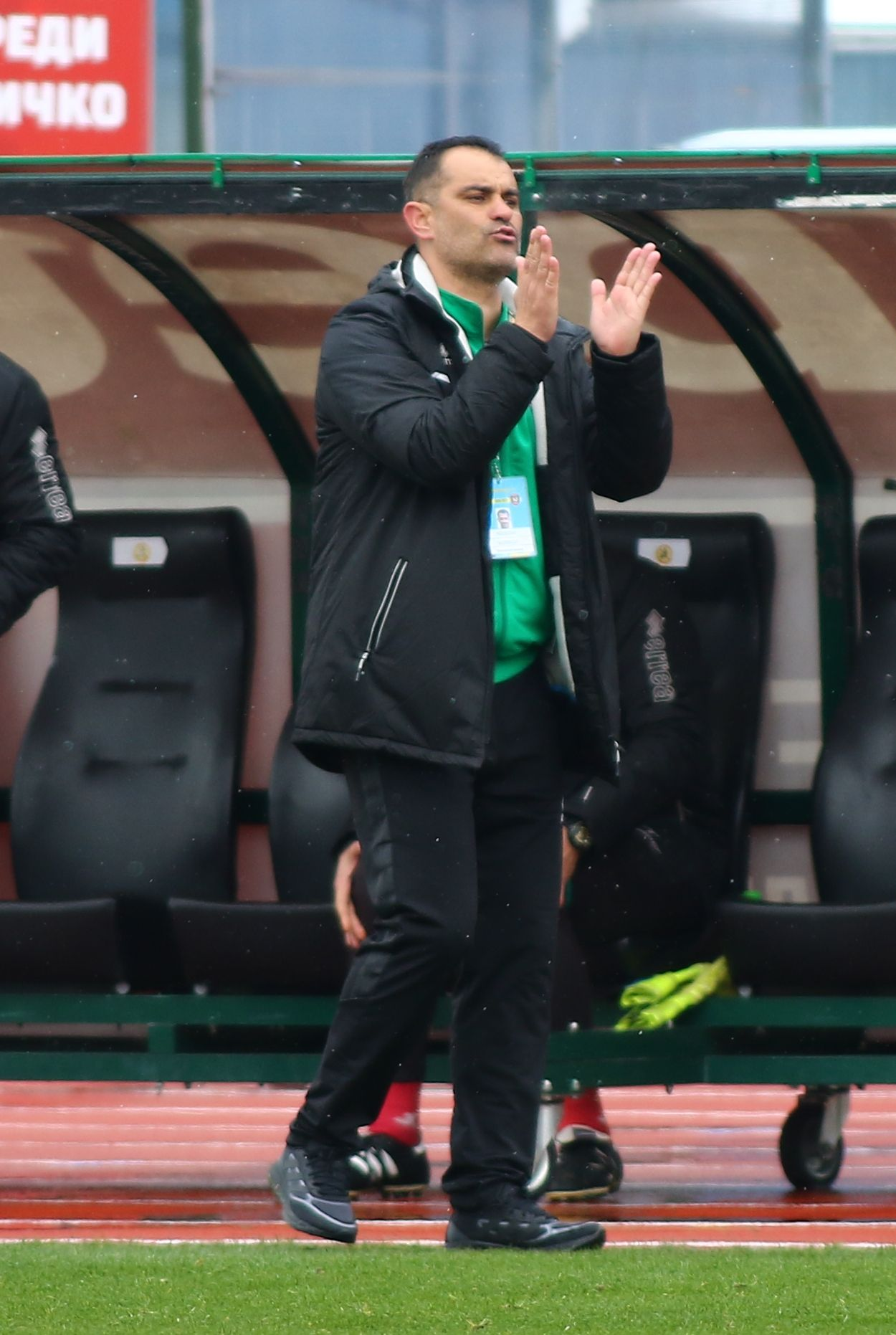

Personal information
- Full name: Veselin Mihaylov Velikov
- Date of birth: 19 March 1977 (age 49)
- Place of birth: Elena, Bulgaria
- Position: Defender

Senior career*
Years	Team	Apps	(Gls)
1997–1998	FC Etar	38	(2)
1999–2000	CSKA Sofia	38	(0)
2001–2005	Marek Dupnitsa	116	(0)
2006–2007	AO Kavala	44	(0)
2007–2008	Rodopa Smolyan	36	(0)
2009–2011	Lyubimets 2007	40	(0)
Total		312	(2)

International career
2000	Bulgaria	3	(0)

Managerial career
- 2012: Lyubimets 2007 (assistant)
- 2013: Lyubimets 2007
- 2014–2017: Dunav Ruse
- 2018: Tsarsko Selo
- 2018–2020: Kariana Erden
- 2021: Botev Vratsa
- 2021–2022: Etar Veliko Tarnovo
- 2022–2023: Chernomorets Burgas
- 2024: Hebar Pazardzhik
- * Club domestic league appearances and goals

Veselin Mihaylov Velikov (Bulgarian: Веселин Великов; born 19 March 1977) is a Bulgarian professional football manager and former player.

== Career ==
Velikov was the manager of Dunav Ruse from June 2014 till October 2017, when he left the club by mutual consent.

On 3 January 2018, Velikov was appointed as the new manager of Tsarsko Selo Sofia after old manager Nikola Spasov was announced as the new manager of the Kazakhstan Premier League team Kyzylzhar.

On 20 June 2021, Velikov was announced as the new manager of Etar Veliko Tarnovo.

On 10 June 2024, Velikov was appointed as the new manager of Hebar Pazardzhik.

== Manager statistics ==
As of 11 June 2024

Team	From	To	Record				
Team	From	To	G	W	D	L	Win %
Lyubimets	1 January 2013	10 August 2013	16	12	2	2	75.00
Dunav Ruse	1 July 2014	16 October 2017	86	40	23	23	46.51
Tsarsko Selo	3 January 2018	28 August 2018	11	7	1	3	63.64
Kariana Erden	29 August 2018	31 December 2020	63	26	15	22	41.27
Botev Vratsa	15 March 2021	8 June 2021	13	4	3	6	30.77
Etar	1 July 2021	1 June 2022	39	22	5	12	56.41
Chernomorets Burgas	11 October 2022	23 June 2023	27	18	3	6	66.67
Hebar	10 June 2024	1 October 2024	0	0	0	0	—
Total			255	129	52	74	50.59
