= Todor Kiselichkov =

Bulgarian footballer and manager

Personal information
- Full name: Todor Mihaylov Kiselichkov
- Date of birth: 4 September 1975 (age 51)
- Place of birth: Burgas, Bulgaria
- Height: 1.67 m (5 ft 6 in)
- Position: Midfielder

Senior career*
Years	Team	Apps	(Gls)
1994–2004	Naftex Burgas	212	(38)
2004–2005	Nesebar	23	(0)
2005–2006	Chernomorets Burgas	22	(4)
2009–2010	Neftochimic 1986	?	(?)

Managerial career
- 2008–2009: Chernomorets Burgas (B team)
- 2009–2012: Chernomorets Burgas (youth team)
- 2012–2013: Neftochimic 1986 (assistant)
- 2013: Ludogorets (assistant)
- 2014: Master Burgas (assistant)
- 2014: Chernomorets Burgas
- 2015: Pirin Gotse Delchev
- 2015–2016: Septemvri Simitli
- 2016: Neftochimic (assistant)
- 2017: Uragan Boyadzhik
- 2017–2018: Botev Plovdiv (U19 coach)
- 2018: Lokomotiv GO
- 2020–2021: Septemvri Simitli
- 2021: CSKA 1948
- 2021: Arda (assistant)
- 2022: Spartak Varna
- 2022–2023: Spartak Varna (assistant)
- 2024: Dobrudzha Dobrich
- 2024–2025: Yantra Gabrovo
- 2025: Neftochimic Burgas
- * Club domestic league appearances and goals

Todor Kiselichkov (Bulgarian: Тодор Киселичков; born 4 September 1975) is a former Bulgarian footballer and currently manager of Yantra Gabrovo.

== Career ==
Over the course of his career Kiselichkov played mainly in the top division of Bulgarian football, most notably for Neftochimic during their successful period in the 1990s. He was known as a skillful free kick taker.

On 10 July 2017, Kiselichkov was appointed as coach of Botev Plovdiv's U19 team. In August 2022, Kiselichkov took over as head coach of Spartak Varna.

== Personal life ==
Kiselichkov is married to Milena and is the father of twin boys.
