= Antoni Zdravkov =

Bulgarian footballer

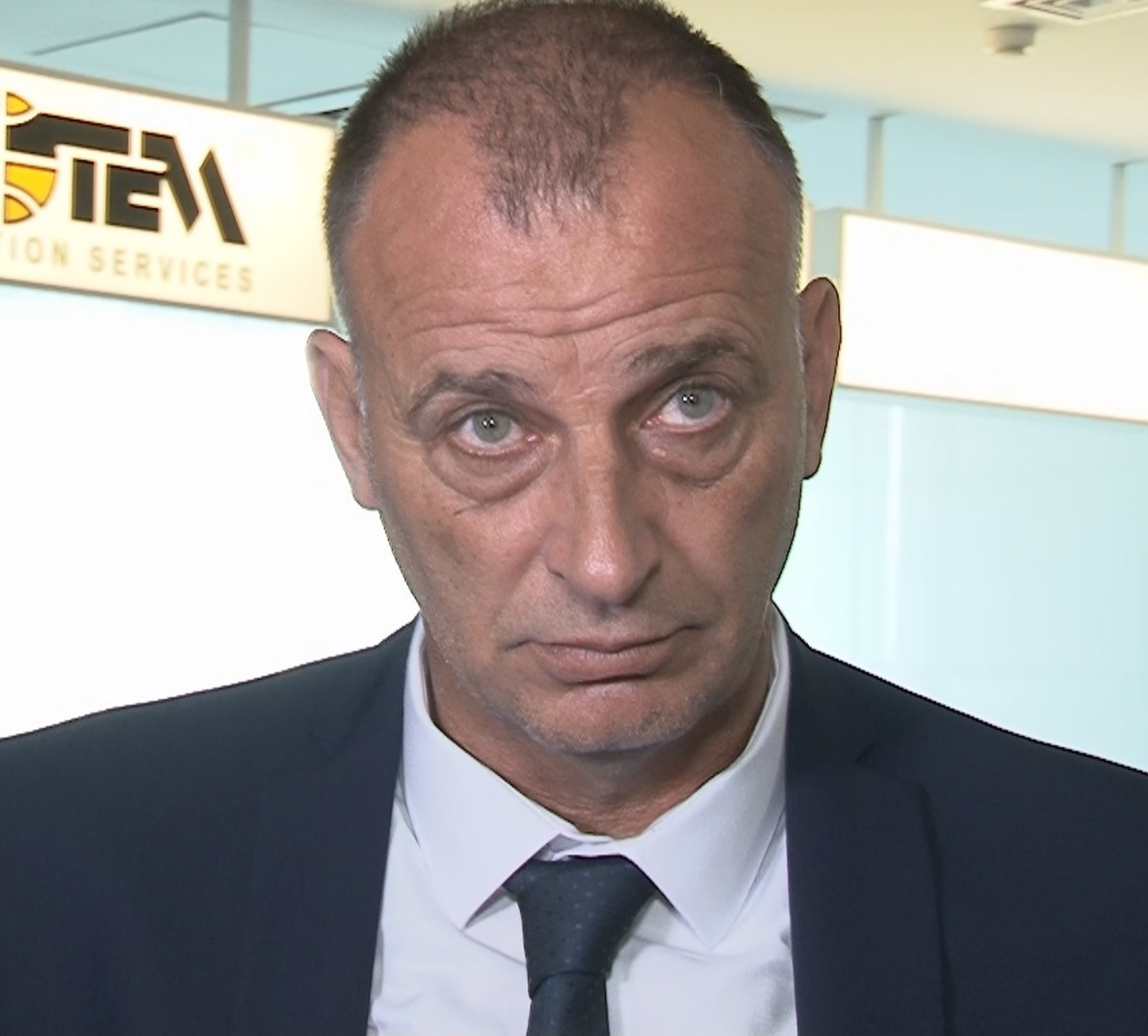
- Zdravkov in 2018

Personal information
- Full name: Antoni Ivanov Zdravkov
- Date of birth: 20 August 1964 (age 62)
- Place of birth: Sofia, Bulgaria
- Height: 1.86 m (6 ft 1 in)
- Position: Defender

Senior career*
Years	Team	Apps	(Gls)
1984–1987	Levski Sofia	43	(0)
1987–1990	Lokomotiv Sofia	70	(4)
1990	Yantra Gabrovo	6	(0)
1991	Marítimo	19	(0)
1991–1992	Nacional	22	(0)
1992–1993	Benfica Castelo Branco	19	(1)
1993–1994	Lokomotiv Sofia	25	(1)
1994–1996	Velbazhd Kyustendil		
1996–2000	Septemvri Sofia	120	(8)

International career
1986–1989	Bulgaria	3	(0)

Managerial career
- 2005–2006: Chavdar Byala Slatina
- 2006–2008: Kaliakra Kavarna (Assistant)
- 2008: Kaliakra Kavarna
- 2008–2009: Levski Sofia (Assistant)
- 2010–2011: Kaliakra Kavarna
- 2011: Levski Sofia (Assistant)
- 2011–2012: Botev Vratsa
- 2012–2013: Botev Vratsa
- 2013–2014: Levski Sofia
- 2014–2018: Bulgaria U21
- 2018: Ludogorets Razgrad (Assistant)
- 2018–2019: Ludogorets Razgrad
- 2019–2021: Botev Vratsa
- 2021: Tsarsko Selo Sofia
- 2021–2022: Montana
- * Club domestic league appearances and goals

Antoni Ivanov Zdravkov (born 20 August 1964) is a former Bulgarian professional footballer.

As a defender, he enjoyed spells at Levski Sofia, Lokomotiv Sofia, Yantra Gabrovo, Marítimo, Nacional, Benfica Castelo Branco, Velbazhd Kyustendil and Septemvri Sofia. He was capped by Bulgaria three times. He retired as a player in January 2001 at the age of 36.

== Career ==
He is a member of PFC Levski Sofia, with whom he was also the most successful in his career. He won the 1984–85 A Group championship and the Bulgarian Cup (1986) with the team. Later, he performed with less achievements in PFC Lokomotiv Sofia. After the fall of Soviet Communism, he went abroad. For two years, he played in Portugal (including S.L. Benfica in Lisbon), but did not make much progress during that period. After returning to the country in 1993, he was mainly active in clubs from the lower leagues. At the beginning of his career, he also made three appearances for the Bulgaria national team.

=== Manager career ===
A few years after his football career came to an end, he started training. He became involved with FC Kaliakra Kavarna's team, there he started as assistant to Velislav Vutsov, who led him to the greatest success in his history: the semi-final of the Bulgarian Cup in the 2007-2008 season . Drugoligowiec of Kavarna eliminated, among others, Chavdar Etropole and PFC Lokomotiv Plovdiv, only lost with PFC Cherno More Varna . In the league, the team took second position, which allowed him to play for a place in the league in barracks. However, here is more powerful turned out FC Minyor Pernik, which won the penalty shootout. After leaving Wucowa Zdrawkow he trained Kaliakra briefly. At the beginning of the 2009-2010 season he was offered a job at PFC Levski Sofia as assistant to Georgi Ivanov. However, Ivanov did not have the official training license for UEFA, so the name Zdravkov was entered in the minutes. The Ivanov-Zdravov duo led the club to the third place in the league, guaranteeing a game in the UEFA Europa League. Their mission ended with the end of the game; Yasen Petrov's new trainer was Lewski . Zdrawkow returned to Kaliakry, who at the time was already playing in the first division. At the end of the 2010-2011 season he finished twelfth in the league with a guaranteed place in the league. However, this result did not please activists who in May 2011 gave the trainer a speech. His successor was Adalbert Zafirov. Later he worked again with Ivanov as his assistant in Lewski for several months, and since December 2011 he has been coaching POFC Botev Vratsa.

On 19 March 2014, while coaching Levski Sofia quit after defeat by Botev Plovdiv in the quarter-finals of the Bulgarian Cup. In late October 2014, Zdravkov was appointed as manager of the Bulgaria U21 national team.

On 9 June 2018 he left the U21 national team to join Ludogorets Razgrad as an assistant to the new general manager Paulo Autuori. Zdravkov eventually remained with the U21 national side until he replaced the Brazilian Autuori as the manager. Zdravkov became the head coach of the team from Razgrad after Autuori stepped down in October 2018, but in early March 2019 (following a string of disappointing results in the league) he was succeeded by Stoycho Stoev. However, Zdravkov remained as part of Stoev's coaching staff.

=== Controversy ===
On 7 April 2013, while coaching Botev Vratsa in a match against CSKA Sofia, Zdravkov attracted controversy after he contested a refereeing decision in an unconventional way - by showing a red card to the match official and attempting to tear the referee's cards. He was subsequently sent to the stands and banned for one match.

== Honours ==
=== Player ===
Levski Sofia

- A Group: 1984–85
- Bulgarian Cup: 1986
