= Ivan Mihov =

Bulgarian footballer

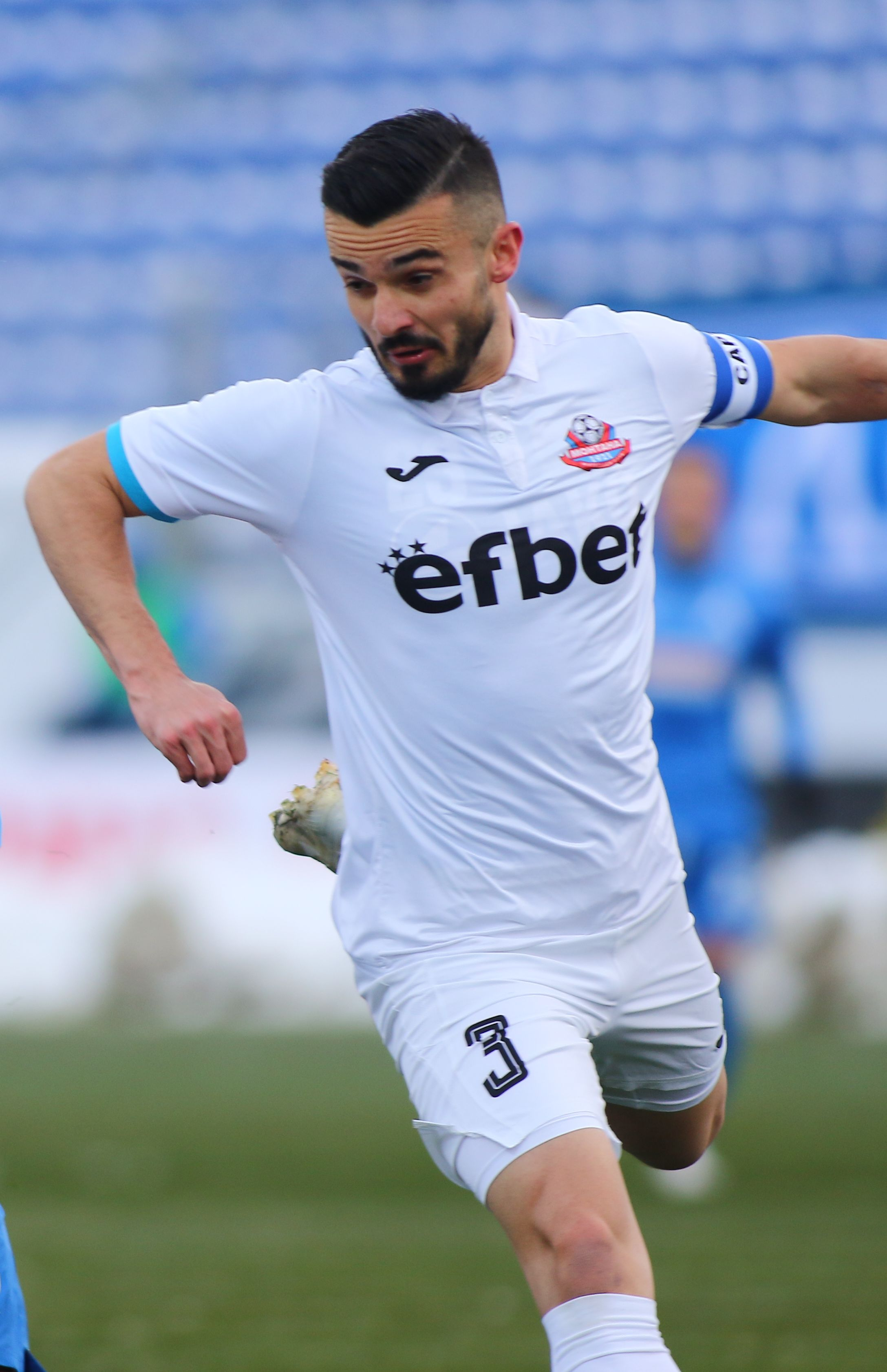

Personal information
- Full name: Ivan Dimitrov Mihov
- Date of birth: 8 June 1991 (age 35)
- Place of birth: Blagoevgrad, Bulgaria
- Height: 1.85 m (6 ft 1 in)
- Position: Centre-back

Senior career*
Years	Team	Apps	(Gls)
2009–2011	Pirin Blagoevgrad	10	(0)
2011–2012	Minyor Pernik	25	(1)
2013	Montana		
2014	Akzhayik		
2014–2022	Montana		
- * Club domestic league appearances and goals

Ivan Dimitrov Mihov (Bulgarian: Иван Михов; born 8 June 1991) is a Bulgarian former professional footballer who played as a centre-back.
