= Arena Tsarsko Selo =

Multi-purpose stadium in Sofia, Bulgaria

- Interactive map of Arena Tsarsko Selo
- Location: Sofia, Bulgaria
- Coordinates: 42°38′11.9″N 23°18′57.5″E
- Owner: FC Tsarsko Selo Sofia
- Capacity: 1,550(1,500 seating)
- Surface: Grass
- Field size: 105 X 68

Construction
- Groundbreaking: 2015
- Built: 2015
- Opened: 2015
- Renovated: 2019

Tenants
- Tsarsko Selo (2015–2022); CSKA 1948 II (2021–2025)

Arena Tsarsko Selo (Bulgarian: Арена „Царско Село“) is a multi-purpose stadium, located in Sofia, Bulgaria. The stadium holds 1,550 people, of which 1,500 are seating. The stadium was built in 2015 and it's part of Sports Complex Tsarsko Selo.

It is currently used mostly for football matches. It was the home ground of Tsarsko Selo until team's dissolvement in 2022.

Since July 2021 the stadium hosts home matches of CSKA 1948 II.
