= Reyan Daskalov =

Bulgarian footballer

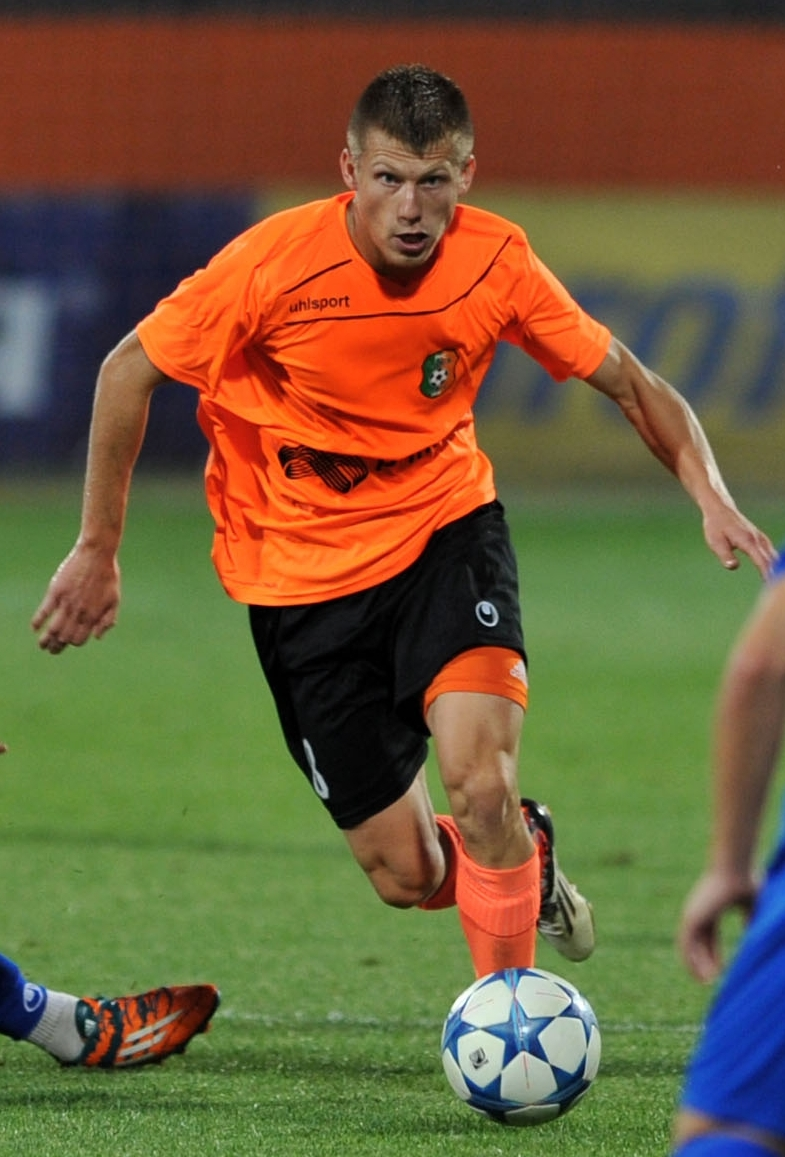
- Daskalov playing for Litex II in 2015

Personal information
- Full name: Reyan Stiliyanov Daskalov
- Date of birth: 10 February 1995 (age 31)
- Place of birth: Ruse, Bulgaria
- Height: 1.80 m (5 ft 11 in)
- Positions: Defender; midfielder

Team information
- Current team: Lokomotiv Sofia
- Number: 22

Youth career
- 2002–2008: Levski 2000 Ruse
- 2008–2013: Litex Lovech

Senior career*
Years	Team	Apps	(Gls)
2013–2016	Litex Lovech	3	(0)
2015	→ Chernomorets Burgas (loan)	7	(0)
2015–2016	Litex Lovech II	13	(1)
2016–2021	Tsarsko Selo	124	(7)
2021–2022	Beroe	16	(0)
2022–2025	CSKA 1948 II	11	(1)
2022–2025	CSKA 1948	81	(1)
2025–	Lokomotiv Sofia	31	(0)

International career
2013–2014	Bulgaria U19	8	(2)
- * Club domestic league appearances and goals as of 11 June 2026

Reyan Stiliyanov Daskalov (Bulgarian: Реян Стилиянов Даскалов; born 10 February 1995) is a Bulgarian professional footballer who plays as a defender or midfielder for Lokomotiv Sofia.

== Career ==
=== Litex Lovech ===
Daskalov joined Litex Academy from Levski Ruse, where he had played since he was 8. In 2013, he got called to train with the first team by the manager back then, Hristo Stoichkov and on 19 May 2013 he made his professional debut for the team in a match against Pirin Gotse Delchev.

==== Chernomorets Burgas loan ====
On 19 January 2015, he was loaned out to Chernomorets Burgas for the rest of the season. He made his debut for the team on 28 February in a match against PFC Montana.

==== Return to Litex ====
After his loan end, he joined back the newly founded second team of Litex in B Group as captain.

=== Tsarsko Selo ===
Daskalov started training with the doubles team. Just before the start of the season he was loaned to the newly promoted to the Second League team Tsarsko Selo and made his debut for the team in the first round.

== Career statistics ==
As of 22 August 2016

Club	Season	Division	League		Cup		Europe		Total	
Club	Season	Division	Apps	Goals	Apps	Goals	Apps	Goals	Apps	Goals
Litex Lovech	2012–13	A Group	1	0	0	0	–		1	0
Litex Lovech	2013–14	A Group	0	0	0	0	–		0	0
Chernomorets Burgas (loan)	2014–15	B Group	7	0	0	0	–		7	0
Litex Lovech II	2015–16	B Group	13	1	–		–		13	1
Litex Lovech	2015–16	A Group	2	0	0	0	0	0	2	0
Litex Lovech	Total		3	0	0	0	0	0	3	0
Tsarsko Selo	2016–17	Second League	3	0	0	0	–		3	0
Tsarsko Selo	Total		3	0	0	0	0	0	3	0
Career Total			26	1	0	0	0	0	26	1
