= Rosen Kirilov =

Bulgarian footballer (born 1973)

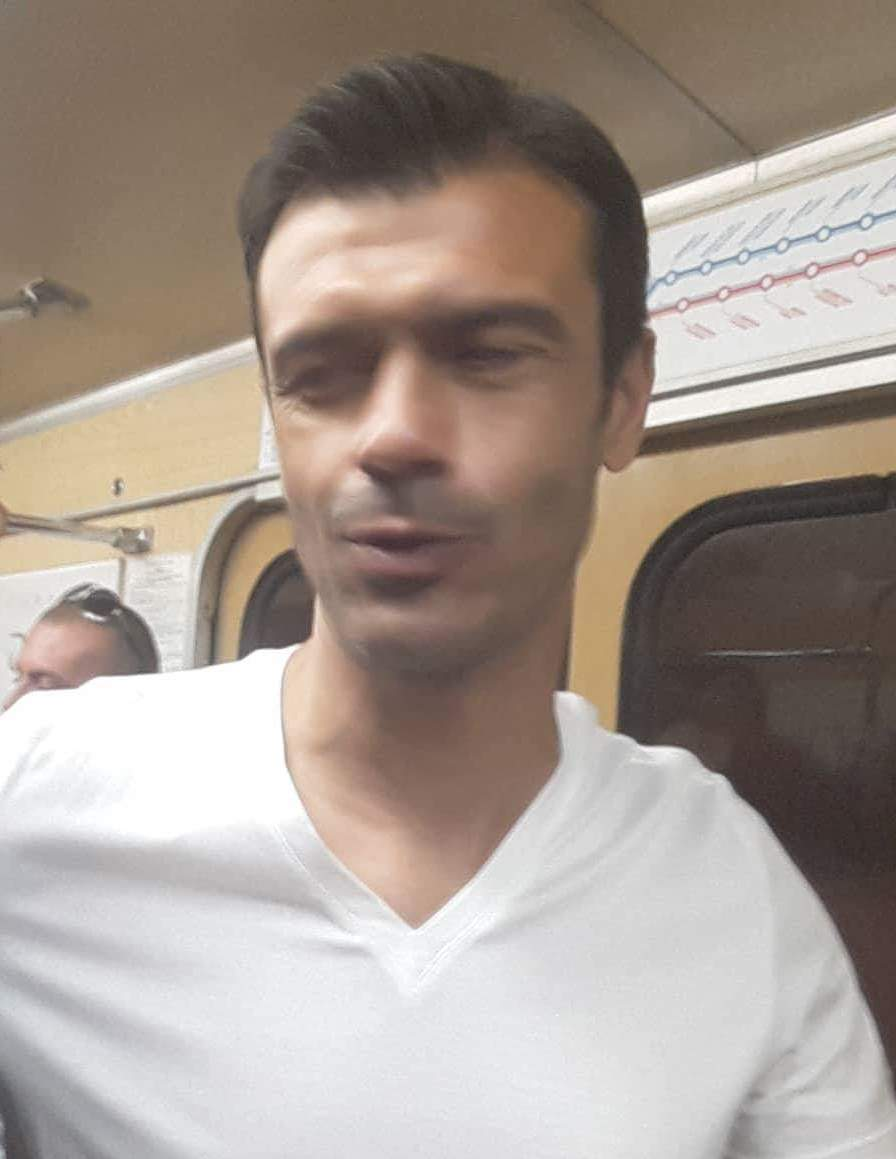
- Kirilov in 2018

Personal information
- Full name: Rosen Yordanov Kirilov
- Date of birth: 4 January 1973 (age 53)
- Place of birth: Vidin, Bulgaria
- Height: 1.83 m (6 ft 0 in)
- Position: Centre back

Youth career
- 1983–1990: Bdin Vidin

Senior career*
Years	Team	Apps	(Gls)
1990–1991	Bdin Vidin	?	(?)
1991–1996	CSKA Sofia	61	(2)
1994	→ Spartak Pleven (loan)	?	(?)
1996	→ Litex Lovech (loan)	12	(1)
1996–1998	Litex Lovech	39	(1)
1999–2001	Adanaspor	63	(0)
2001–2007	Litex Lovech	122	(10)
2007–2008	APOP Kinyras	22	(0)
2008	Vaslui	1	(0)
Total		327	(13)

International career
1998–2006	Bulgaria	51	(0)

Managerial career
- 2013: CSKA Sofia (assistant)
- 2013–2014: Slavia Sofia (assistant)
- 2016–2018: Vitosha Bistritsa (assistant)
- 2018–2019: Vitosha Bistritsa
- 2019: Etar
- 2021: CSKA 1948
- 2022: Botev Vratsa
- 2024: Spartak Varna
- 2025: Krumovgrad
- * Club domestic league appearances and goals

Rosen Yordanov Kirilov (Bulgarian: Росен Йорданов Кирилов; born 4 January 1973 in Vidin) is a Bulgarian retired professional footballer who played as a defender, and later managed various clubs.

He played as a centre-back for the Bulgaria national team, CSKA Sofia, Litex Lovech, Adanaspor, APOP Kinyras and Vaslui.

== Career ==
Kirilov moved at the age of 18 from Bdin Vidin to CSKA Sofia in 1991. His first competitive game for the club was against Etar Veliko Tarnovo at Ivaylo Stadium on 10 November 1991 which CSKA lost 1–0.

Kirilov made 51 appearances for the Bulgaria national team from 1998 to 2006. He was part of the squads at the 1998 World Cup and Euro 2004.

== Career statistics ==
=== Club ===
Club performance			League		Cup		Continental		Other		Total	
Club	League	Season	Apps	Goals	Apps	Goals	Apps	Goals	Apps	Goals	Apps	Goals
Bulgaria			League		Bulgarian Cup		Europe		Other (Note: Includes Bulgarian Supercup matches.)		Total	
CSKA Sofia	A Group	1991–92	5	0	4	0	0	0	–		9	0
CSKA Sofia	A Group	1992–93	25	0	7	0	1	0	–		33	0
CSKA Sofia	A Group	1993–94	3	0	0	0	1	0	–		4	0
CSKA Sofia	A Group	1994–95	20	2	4	0	4	0	–		28	2
CSKA Sofia	A Group	1995–96	8	0	2	0	–		–		10	0
CSKA Sofia	Total		61	2	17	0	6	0	0	0	84	2
Litex Lovech	A Group	1995–96	12	1	0	0	–		–		12	1
Litex Lovech	B Group	1996–97	?	?	?	?	–		–		?	?
Litex Lovech	A Group	1997–98	28	0	0	0	–		–		28	0
Litex Lovech	A Group	1998–99	11	1	0	0	3	0	–		14	3
Litex Lovech	Total		51	2	0	0	3	0	0	0	54	2
Adanaspor	Süper Lig	1998–99	15	0	0	0	–		–		15	0
Adanaspor	Süper Lig	1999–00	21	0	1	0	–		–		22	0
Adanaspor	Süper Lig	2000–01	27	0	2	0	–		–		29	0
Adanaspor	Total		63	0	3	0	0	0	0	0	66	0
Litex Lovech	A Group	2001–02	23	5	0	0	5	0	–		28	5
Litex Lovech	A Group	2002–03	22	1	0	0	4	0	–		26	1
Litex Lovech	A Group	2003–04	25	3	0	0	2	0	–		27	3
Litex Lovech	A Group	2004–05	20	0	0	0	4	0	–		24	0
Litex Lovech	A Group	2005–06	20	0	0	0	6	0	–		26	0
Litex Lovech	A Group	2006–07	12	1	0	0	5	1	–		17	2
Litex Lovech	Total		122	10	0	0	26	1	0	0	148	11
APOP Kinyras	First Division	2007–08	22	0	0	0	–		–		22	0
APOP Kinyras	Total		22	0	0	0	0	0	0	0	22	0
Vaslui	Liga I	2008–09	1	0	0	0	–		–		1	0
Vaslui	Total		1	0	0	0	0	0	0	0	1	0
Career statistics			52	6	4	0	9	0	0	0	62	7

== Honours ==
CSKA Sofia

- Bulgarian League: 1991–92
- Bulgarian Cup: 1992–93

Litex Lovech

- Bulgarian League: 1997–98
- Bulgarian Cup: 2003–04
