= Nikola Spasov =

Bulgarian footballer (1958–2020)

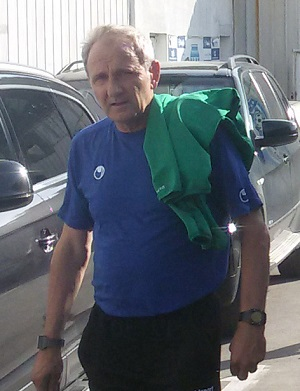

Personal information
- Full name: Nikola Asenov Spasov
- Date of birth: 15 December 1958
- Place of birth: Sofia, Bulgaria
- Date of death: 23 November 2020 (aged 61)
- Place of death: Montana, Bulgaria
- Height: 1.80 m (5 ft 11 in)
- Position: Striker

Senior career*
Years	Team	Apps	(Gls)
1977–1981	Lokomotiv Sofia	53	(0)
1981–1983	Dunav Ruse	67	(30)
1983–1986	Cherno More	84	(46)
1986	Levski Sofia	0	(0)
1986	Spartak Varna	12	(9)
1986–1988	Farense	28	(5)
1988–1989	Salgueiros	30	(18)
1989–1990	Paços Ferreira	33	(34)
1990–1991	Beira-Mar	15	(6)
1991–1992	Paços Ferreira	22	(10)
1992–1993	Rio Ave	31	(16)
1993–1994	Cherno More	12	(4)
1994–1995	Freamunde	17	(4)
Total		404	(182)

Managerial career
- 1998–1999: Verín
- 1999–2002: Imortal
- 2004: Cherno More (assistant)
- 2004–2005: Marek Dupnitsa (assistant)
- 2005: Bregalnica Štip
- 2006–2007: Cherno More (assistant)
- 2007–2009: Cherno More
- 2011: Bregalnica Štip
- 2011: Svetkavitsa
- 2012: Spartak Varna
- 2012: Bregalnica Štip
- 2013–2014: Kaliakra Kavarna
- 2014–2016: Cherno More
- 2016–2017: Tsarsko Selo
- 2018: Kyzylzhar
- 2018–2020: Tsarsko Selo
- 2020: Montana
- * Club domestic league appearances and goals

Nikola Spasov (Bulgarian: Никола Спасов; 15 December 1958 – 23 November 2020) was a Bulgarian professional footballer and coach.

== Playing career ==
Born in Sofia, Spasov played for PFC Lokomotiv Sofia, FC Dunav Ruse, PFC Cherno More Varna and PFC Spartak Varna in his country. With the first club, he won the Bulgarian League in his first professional season.

Spasov moved to Portugal in December 1986, and remained in the nation for the following seven years, representing five teams. In the 1989–90 campaign he scored a career-best 34 goals for F.C. Paços de Ferreira, which however failed to promote them from the second division; in the top flight he played with S.C. Farense, S.C. Beira-Mar and Paços.

In June 1994, after one season in his homeland with former team Cherno More, Spasov retired from football at nearly 36 years of age.

== Coaching career ==
Spasov started managing in Portugal and Spain, in both countries at amateur level. In 2003, he was appointed at PFC Marek Dupnitsa in his country, switching to the Republic of Macedonia and FK Bregalnica Štip the following season.

From 2006 and during four years, Spasov worked with former club Cherno More, as assistant, head coach and scout. In 2011, he returned to Bregalnica.

On 3 January 2018, he was announced as the new manager of the Kazakhstan Premier League team Kyzylzhar. Spasov has managed Tsarsko Selo on two occasions – during 2016/2017 as well as between June 2018 and April 2020.

== Honours ==
=== Player ===
Lokomotiv Sofia

- Bulgarian League: 1977–78

=== Manager ===
Cherno More

- Bulgarian Cup: 2014–15
- Bulgarian Supercup: 2015

Tsarsko Selo

- Bulgarian Second League: 2018–19

== Personal life ==
Spasov's younger brother, Yulian (born 1963), was also a footballer. A midfielder, he too represented Spartak and Cherno More Varna, and also spent several years as a professional in Portugal (nine seasons, including eight with Paços de Ferreira).

On 23 November 2020, Spasov died from a severe flu in Montana, amid the COVID-19 pandemic in Bulgaria.
