= Petko Petkov (football manager) =

Bulgarian footballer and manager

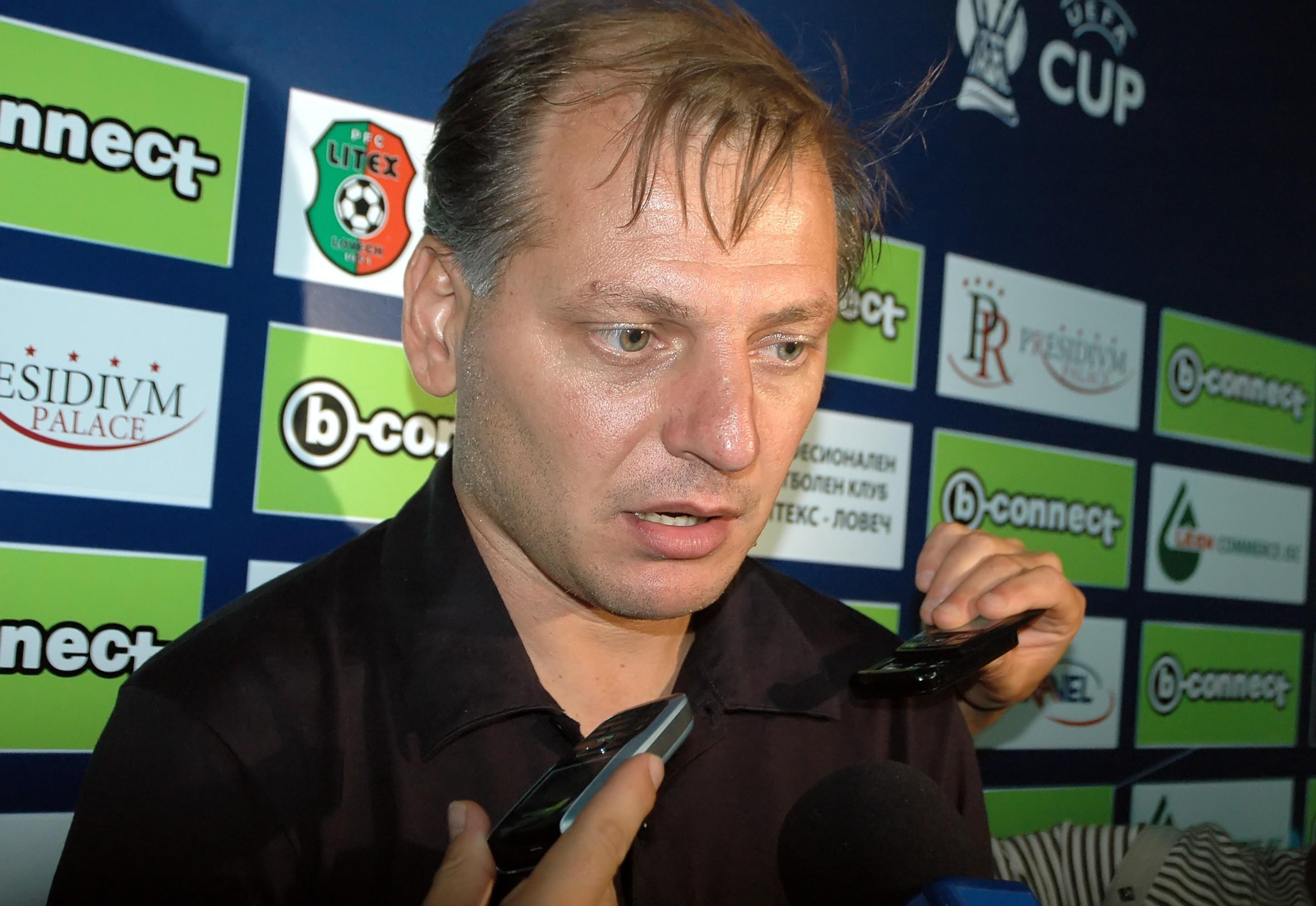

Personal information
- Full name: Petko Tsvetanov Petkov
- Date of birth: 29 March 1968 (age 58)
- Place of birth: Sofia, Bulgaria
- Position: Forward

Youth career
- 1976–1986: FC Lulin

Senior career*
Years	Team	Apps	(Gls)
1988–1991	Akademik Sofia		
1991–1993	Septemvri Sofia		

Managerial career
- 1995–2000: Akademik Sofia (youth coach)
- 2000–2001: Minyor Pernik (assistant)
- 2001–2002: Al Nadjma (assistant)
- 2002–2003: Septemvri Sofia (assistant)
- 2003–2004: Septemvri Sofia
- 2005–2006: Levski Sofia (youth coach)
- 2007–2010: Litex Lovech (youth coach)
- 2010: Litex Lovech (caretaker)
- 2018–2019: CSKA 1948
- 2019–2020: Etar
- * Club domestic league appearances and goals

Petko Tsvetanov Petkov (Bulgarian: Петко Петков; born 29 March 1968) is a Bulgarian football manager and former player. He played as forward.

== Career ==
=== As a player ===
Petkov began his career at FC Lulin, training in the youth team between 1976 and 1986. From 1986 to 1988 he served his duty in the army. From 1988 to 1991 Petkov played for Akademik, in the Bulgarian "B" group, and from 1991 to 1993 he played for Septemvri. He retired from football in 1993 after being diagnosed with an abductor injury.

=== As a manager ===
Petkov was youth coach at Septemvri from 1995 until 2008. He helped Septemvri to win a total of eighteen awards during his stay in the club. He discovered a number of talented players, including Ivan Ivanov, Ivan Karadjov, Stefan Pavlov, Georgi Sokolov, Trifon Trifonov, Alexander Tonev, Alexander Vasilev, Bojidar Lazov, Hristo Surmov, Veselin Mitrev, Spas Popov, Apostol Delev and Garra Mladenov.

He was appointed manager of CSKA 1948 in August 2018.

He was appointed manager of Etar in December 2019.
