= 2018–19 PFC Ludogorets Razgrad season =

Ludogorets Razgrad
2018–19 season
- Chairman: Aleksandar Aleksandrov
- Manager: Dimitar Dimitrov (until 6 June); Paulo Autuori (6 June - 9 October); Antoni Zdravkov (9 October - 6 March); Stoycho Stoev (from 6 March)
- A-Group: 1st
- Bulgarian Cup: Quarter-final (vs. CSKA Sofia)
- Bulgarian Supercup: Winners
- UEFA Champions League: Second qualifying round
- UEFA Europa League: Group stage
- Top goalscorer: League: Claudiu Keșerü (20); All: Claudiu Keșerü (24)
Home colours	Away colours	Third colours

The 2018–19 season is Ludogorets Razgrad's eight consecutive season in the Bulgarian First League, of which they are defending champions. They will also take part in the Bulgarian Cup, Supercup and will enter the UEFA Champions League first qualifying round.

== Season events ==
On 6 June 2018, Dimitar Dimitrov left Ludogorets by mutual consent, being replaced by Paulo Autuori. Three months later Autuori also left Ludogorets by mutual consent, being replaced by Antoni Zdravkov on 9 October 2018. On 6 March 2019 Zdravkov became the third manager of the season to leave the club by mutual consent, with Stoycho Stoev being announced as his replacement.

== Squad ==
As of match played 24 May 2019

No.	Name	Nationality	Position	Date of birth (age)	Signed from	Signed in	Contract ends	Apps.	Goals
Goalkeepers
1	Jorge Broun	(Argentina)	GK	23 May 1986 (aged 33)	Colón	2017		40	0
23	Plamen Iliev	(Bulgaria)	GK	30 November 1991 (aged 27)	Astra Giurgiu	2019		12	0
27	Vladislav Stoyanov	(Bulgaria)	GK	8 June 1987 (aged 31)	Sheriff Tiraspol	2013		124	0
29	Daniel Naumov	(Bulgaria)	GK	29 March 1998 (aged 21)	Youth Team	2016		0	0
33	Renan	(Brazil)	GK	18 May 1989 (aged 30)	Avaí	2017		66	0
69	Damyan Damyanov	(Bulgaria)	GK	29 July 2000 (aged 18)	Youth Team	2016		1	0
Defenders
3	Anton Nedyalkov	(Bulgaria)	DF	30 April 1993 (aged 26)	FC Dallas	2018		46	1
4	Cicinho	(Brazil)	DF	26 December 1988 (aged 30)	Santos	2015		116	1
5	Georgi Terziev	(Bulgaria)	DF	18 April 1992 (aged 27)	Chernomorets Burgas	2013		114	4
6	Natanael	(Brazil)	DF	25 December 1990 (aged 28)	Athletico Paranaense	2015		141	6
11	Stanislav Manolev	(Bulgaria)	DF	16 December 1985 (aged 33)	CSKA Sofia	2019		5	0
21	Dragoș Grigore	(Romania)	DF	7 September 1986 (aged 32)	Al-Sailiya	2018		13	4
30	Cosmin Moți	(Romania)	DF	3 December 1984 (aged 34)	Dinamo București	2012		258	31
53	Lachezar Kovachev	(Bulgaria)	DF	24 March 1999 (aged 20)	Youth Team	2017		1	0
58	Dimitar Iliev	(Bulgaria)	DF	22 June 1999 (aged 19)	Youth Team	2017		1	0
75	Martin Milkov	(Bulgaria)	DF	25 December 1999 (aged 19)	Youth Team	2017		1	0
87	Preslav Petrov	(Bulgaria)	DF	1 May 1995 (aged 24)	Vidima-Rakovski	2014		8	0
90	Rafael Forster	(Brazil)	DF	23 July 1990 (aged 28)	Zorya Luhansk	2017		33	0
Midfielders
7	Dimo Bakalov	(Bulgaria)	MF	19 December 1988 (aged 30)	Lokomotiv Plovdiv	2018		19	2
8	Lucas Sasha	(Brazil)	MF	1 March 1990 (aged 29)	Hapoel Tel Aviv	2015		126	6
12	Anicet Abel	(Madagascar)	MF	13 March 1990 (aged 29)	Botev Plovdiv	2014		152	12
18	Svetoslav Dyakov	(Bulgaria)	MF	31 May 1984 (aged 34)	Lokomotiv Sofia	2012		296	11
34	Oleg Dimitrov	(Bulgaria)	MF	6 March 1996 (aged 23)	Youth Team	2015		6	0
44	Jacek Góralski	(Poland)	MF	21 September 1992 (aged 26)	Jagiellonia Białystok	2017		70	0
63	David Ribeiro	(Brazil)	MF	23 April 1998 (aged 21)	Santo André	2019		1	0
64	Dominik Yankov	(Bulgaria)	MF	13 July 2000 (aged 18)	Sunderland	2017		8	0
72	Erol Dost	(Bulgaria)	MF	30 May 1999 (aged 19)	Youth Team	2017		3	1
76	Serdar Yusufov	(Bulgaria)	MF	2 October 1998 (aged 20)	Youth Team	2018		0	0
77	Adrian Popa	(Romania)	MF	24 July 1988 (aged 30)	loan from Reading	2019		14	0
84	Marcelinho	(Bulgaria)	MF	24 August 1984 (aged 34)	Bragantino	2011		316	91
88	Wanderson	(Brazil)	MF	2 January 1988 (aged 31)	Portuguesa	2014		203	60
92	Jody Lukoki	(Democratic Republic of the Congo)	MF	15 November 1992 (aged 26)	PEC Zwolle	2015		130	20
96	Serkan Yusein	(Bulgaria)	MF	31 March 1996 (aged 23)	Botev Plovdiv	2019		9	0
	Georgi Valchev	(Bulgaria)	MF	5 February 2000 (aged 19)	Youth Team	2018		0	0
Forwards
28	Claudiu Keșerü	(Romania)	FW	2 December 1986 (aged 32)	Al-Gharafa	2015		167	101
70	Jakub Świerczok	(Poland)	FW	28 December 1982 (aged 36)	Zagłębie Lubin	2017		51	25
Players away on loan
9	Juninho	(Brazil)	FW	7 January 1995 (aged 24)	Atlético Goianiense	2018		2	0
11	May Mahlangu	(South Africa)	MF	1 May 1989 (aged 30)	Dinamo București	2018		8	1
23	Ventsislav Kerchev	(Bulgaria)	DF	2 June 1997 (aged 21)	Youth Team	2014		26	2
37	João Paulo	(Brazil)	FW	2 June 1988 (aged 30)	Botev Plovdiv	2017		50	6
45	Ivaylo Klimentov	(Bulgaria)	MF	3 February 1998 (aged 21)	Youth Team	2015		6	1
98	Svetoslav Kovachev	(Bulgaria)	MF	14 March 1998 (aged 21)	Youth Team	2015		13	2
Players who left during the season
10	Campanharo	(Brazil)	MF	4 April 1992 (aged 27)	Bragantino	2016		104	11
24	Vasil Simeonov	(Bulgaria)	GK	4 February 1998 (aged 21)	Youth Team	2016		1	0
25	Tsvetomir Panov	(Bulgaria)	DF	17 April 1989 (aged 30)	Botev Plovdiv	2018		11	0
80	Denislav Aleksandrov	(Bulgaria)	MF	19 July 1997 (aged 21)	Youth Team	2014		10	1
93	Vura	(Netherlands)	FW	24 July 1993 (aged 25)	Willem II	2013		201	49

=== Out on loan ===
Note: Flags indicate national team as defined under FIFA eligibility rules; some limited exceptions apply. Players may hold more than one non-FIFA nationality.

No.	Pos.	Nation	Player
—	DF	BUL	Ventsislav Kerchev (at Botev Vratsa until 30 June 2019)
—	MF	BUL	Svetoslav Kovachev (at Dunav Ruse until 30 June 2019)
—	MF	BUL	Ivaylo Klimentov (at Vitosha Bistritsa until 30 June 2019)

No.	Pos.	Nation	Player
—	MF	RSA	May Mahlangu (at Ordabasy until November 2019)
—	FW	BRA	João Paulo (at Ordabasy until November 2019)
—	FW	BRA	Juninho (at Goiás until 31 December 2019)

== Transfers ==
=== In ===
Date	Position	Nationality	Name	From	Fee	Ref.
5 June 2018	DF	(Romania)	Dragoș Grigore	Al-Sailiya	Undisclosed	
5 June 2018	MF	(Bulgaria)	Dimo Bakalov	Lokomotiv Plovdiv	Undisclosed	
23 June 2018	DF	(Bulgaria)	Anton Nedyalkov	FC Dallas	Undisclosed	
21 August 2018	MF	(South Africa)	May Mahlangu	Dinamo București	Undisclosed	
27 August 2018	FW	(Brazil)	Júnior Brandão	Atlético Goianiense	Undisclosed	
12 January 2019	GK	(Bulgaria)	Plamen Iliev	Astra Giurgiu	Undisclosed	
23 January 2019	MF	(Bulgaria)	Serkan Yusein	Botev Plovdiv	Undisclosed	
12 February 2019	MF	(Brazil)	David Ribeiro	Santo André	Undisclosed	
18 February 2019	DF	(Bulgaria)	Stanislav Manolev	CSKA Sofia	Undisclosed	

=== Out ===
Date	Position	Nationality	Name	To	Fee	Ref.
1 June 2018	DF	(Bulgaria)	Aleksandar Vasilev	Beroe	Undisclosed	
12 June 2018	DF	(Ukraine)	Ihor Plastun	Gent	Undisclosed	
31 August 2018	FW	(Netherlands)	Virgil Misidjan	1. FC Nürnberg	Undisclosed	
11 January 2019	DF	(Bulgaria)	Tsvetomir Panov	Cherno More	Undisclosed	
Winter 2019	GK	(Bulgaria)	Vasil Simeonov	Pirin Razlog	Undisclosed	
Winter 2019	MF	(Bulgaria)	Denislav Aleksandrov	CSKA 1948 Sofia	Undisclosed	

=== Loans in ===
Start date	Position	Nationality	Name	From	End date	Ref.
20 December 2018	MF	(Romania)	Adrian Popa	Reading	End of Season	

=== Loans out ===
Start date	Position	Nationality	Name	To	End date	Ref.
13 June 2018	DF	(Bulgaria)	Ventsislav Kerchev	Botev Vratsa	30 June 2019	
9 June 2018	MF	(Bulgaria)	Svetoslav Kovachev	Dunav Ruse	30 June 2019	
	MF	(Bulgaria)	Ivaylo Klimentov	Vitosha Bistritsa	30 June 2019	
3 January 2019	FW	(Brazil)	Júnior Brandão	Goiás	31 December 2019	
15 February 2019	MF	(South Africa)	May Mahlangu	Ordabasy	November 2019	
15 February 2019	FW	(Brazil)	João Paulo	Ordabasy	November 2019	

=== Released ===
Date	Position	Nationality	Name	Joined	Date
	MF	(Brazil)	Gustavo Campanharo	Chapecoense	

== Competitions ==
=== Bulgarian Supercup ===
5 July 2018	Ludogorets Razgrad	1 – 0	Slavia Sofia	Stara Zagora
20:30 EEST (UTC+3)	Keșerü 30'; Campanharo (yellow card) 38'; Dyakov (yellow card) 87'	Report	Gamakov (yellow card) 38'; Aleksandrov (yellow card) 90'; Karabelyov (yellow card) 90+2'	Stadium: Trace Arena; Attendance: 850; Referee: Georgi Kabakov

=== A Football Group ===
==== Regular stage ====
===== League table =====
Pos	Team	Pld	W	D	L	GF	GA	GD	Pts	Qualification
1	Ludogorets Razgrad	26	19	5	2	53	14	+39	62	Qualification for the Championship round
2	CSKA Sofia	26	18	3	5	47	14	+33	57	Qualification for the Championship round
3	Levski Sofia	26	17	3	6	51	24	+27	54	Qualification for the Championship round
4	Botev Plovdiv	26	13	6	7	39	21	+18	45	Qualification for the Championship round
5	Cherno More	26	12	6	8	36	34	+2	42	Qualification for the Championship round

Source: Soccerway
Rules for classification: 1) Points; 2) Head-to-head points; 3) Head-to-head goal difference; 4) Head-to-head goals scored; 5) Head-to-head away goals scored (only if two teams); 6) Goal difference; 7) Goals scored; 8) Fairplay ranking; 9) Draw.

===== Results summary =====
Overall								Home						Away					
Pld	W	D	L	GF	GA	GD	Pts	W	D	L	GF	GA	GD	W	D	L	GF	GA	GD
26	19	5	2	53	14	+39	62	11	1	1	29	6	+23	8	4	1	24	8	+16

Last updated: 16 March 2019.
Source: See Results

===== Results by round =====
Round	1	2	3	4	5	6	7	8	9	10	11	12	13	14	15	16	17	18	19	20	21	22	23	24	25	26
Ground	H	A	H	A	H	A	H	H	A	H	A	H	A	A	H	A	H	A	H	A	A	H	A	H	A	H
Result	W	D	L	W	W	D	W	W	W	W	W	W	W	W	W	W	W	D	W	W	D	D	L	W	W	W
Position	5	5	8	4	3	4	3	3	3	2	2	1	1	1	1	1	1	1	1	1	1	1	1	1	1	1

Source: See Results
A = Away; H = Home; W = Win; D = Draw; L = Loss

===== Results =====
21 July 2018 1	Ludogorets Razgrad	1 – 0	Etar Veliko Tarnovo	Razgrad
18:30 EEST (UTC+3)	Wanderson 3'; Dyakov (yellow card) 89'; Lukoki (yellow card) 90+1'	Report	K.Stoyanov (yellow card) 9'; I.Stoyanov (yellow card) 88'	Stadium: Ludogorets Arena; Attendance: 1,300; Referee: Nikola Popov

28 July 2018 2	Beroe Stara Zagora	1 – 1	Ludogorets Razgrad	Stara Zagora
20:45 EEST (UTC+3)	Mesca (yellow card) 19'; Tsvetkov (yellow card) 45'; Raynov 61'; Bandalovski (yellow card) 77'	Report	Natanael (yellow card) 36'; Marcelinho (yellow card) 45' (goal) 57'; Świerczok (yellow card) 68'	Stadium: Beroe Stadium; Attendance: 3,700; Referee: Ivaylo Stoyanov

4 August 2018 3	Ludogorets Razgrad	0 – 1	Lokomotiv Plovdiv	Razgrad
20:45 EEST (UTC+3)	Moți (yellow card) 34'; Cicinho (yellow card) 73'; João Paulo (yellow card) 86'	Report	Aralica (yellow card) 11'; Tomašević (yellow card) 40'; Vezalov (yellow card) 47'; Banović (yellow card) 52'; Posinković (yellow card) 55'; Mihaljević 86' (yellow card) 90+2'	Stadium: Ludogorets Arena; Attendance: 1,200; Referee: Stanislav Todorov

12 August 2018 4	Vitosha Bistritsa	0 – 2	Ludogorets Razgrad	Bistritsa
18:30 EEST (UTC+3)	Gochev (yellow card) 18'; Kotev (yellow card) 23'	Report	Góralski (yellow card) 12'; Vura 65'; Keșerü 75'; Moți (yellow card) 85'; Lukoki (yellow card) 90'	Stadium: Bistritsa Stadium; Attendance: 450; Referee: Georgi Kabakov

19 August 2018 5	Ludogorets Razgrad	1 – 0	CSKA Sofia	Razgrad
21:00 EEST (UTC+3)	Wanderson 21'; Moți (yellow card) 40'; Dyakov (yellow card) 68'; Marcelinho (yellow card) 78'; Lukoki (yellow card) 90+1'	Report	Malinov (yellow card) 5'; Bikel (yellow card) 34'; Rodrigues (yellow card) 45+1'; Lyaskov (yellow card) 67'	Stadium: Ludogorets Arena; Attendance: 7,800; Referee: Nikolay Yordanov

26 August 2018 6	Slavia Sofia	0 – 0	Ludogorets Razgrad	Sofia
18:45 EEST (UTC+3)	Velkovski (yellow card) 16'; Uzunov (yellow card) 51'; Shokolarov (yellow card) 63'; G.Ivanov (yellow card) 90+1'; Petkov (yellow card) 90+3'	Report	Lukoki (yellow card) 87'	Stadium: Vasil Levski National Stadium; Attendance: 160; Referee: Georgi Dimitrov

2 September 2018 7	Ludogorets Razgrad	3 – 1	Dunav Ruse	Razgrad
21:00 EEST (UTC+3)	Lukoki 26'; Keșerü 51', 53'	Report	Kokonov 76'	Stadium: Ludogorets Arena; Attendance: 1,100; Referee: Dragomir Draganov

14 September 2018 8	Ludogorets Razgrad	2 – 1	Vereya	Razgrad
20:00 EEST (UTC+3)	Dyakov (yellow card) 64'; Nedyalkov 78'; Marcelinho 82'	Report	Vušurović (yellow card) 13'; Ognyanov 40'; Ait Malek (yellow card) 72'	Stadium: Ludogorets Arena; Attendance: 480; Referee: Vladimir Valkov

23 September 2018 9	Botev Plovdiv	2 – 3	Ludogorets Razgrad	Plovdiv
20:00 EEST (UTC+3)	Yusein 8' (yellow card) 43'; Nichev (yellow card) 9'; Nedelev 14' (yellow card) 89'; Vutov (yellow card) 61'; Terziev (yellow card) 65'	Report	Dyakov (yellow card) 18'; Keșerü (yellow card) 25'; Moți (yellow card) 33' (goal) 58' (pen.); Mahlangu 62'; Marcelinho 89'	Stadium: Botev 1912 Football Complex; Attendance: 2,800; Referee: Ivaylo Stoyanov

29 September 2018 10	Ludogorets Razgrad	5 – 1	Cherno More	Razgrad
20:00 EEST (UTC+3)	Wanderson 12'; Keșerü 47', 71'; Bakalov 48'; Marcelinho 62'; Moți (yellow card) 87'	Report	N'Dongala 55'	Stadium: Ludogorets Arena; Attendance: 700; Referee: Nikola Popov

7 October 2018 11	Botev Vratsa	1 – 4	Ludogorets Razgrad	Montana
16:45 EEST (UTC+3)	Valchev (yellow card) 22'; Bojinov (yellow card) 45+1'; Domovchiyski 53'; Mihaylov (yellow card) 59'	Report	Lukoki 10'; Keșerü 20', 39', 43'; Cicinho (yellow card) 45+1'; Góralski (yellow card) 76'	Stadium: Ogosta Stadium; Attendance: 700; Referee: Nikolay Yordanov

20 October 2018 12	Ludogorets Razgrad	2 – 1	Levski Sofia	Razgrad
20:00 EEST (UTC+3)	Nedyalkov (yellow card) 19'; Dyakov (yellow card) 21'; Lukoki 34'; Wanderson 45+1'; Cicinho (yellow card) 78'; Renan (yellow card) 89'; Bakalov (yellow card) 90+2'; Moți (yellow card) 90+4'	Report	Cvetković (yellow card) 11'; Belmonte (yellow card) 51'; Kostov 54'; Goranov (yellow card) 86'; Nascimento (yellow card) 88'; Thiam (yellow card) 90+5'	Stadium: Ludogorets Arena; Attendance: 6,400; Referee: Georgi Kabakov

28 October 2018 13	Septemvri Sofia	1 – 4	Ludogorets Razgrad	Sofia
17:30 EET (UTC+2)	Chandarov 7'; Meledje (yellow card) 24'; Fabiano (yellow card) 48'	Report	Świerczok 46'; Keșerü 74', 78'; Wanderson 89'; Marcelinho (yellow card) 90+1'	Stadium: Vasil Levski National Stadium; Attendance: 100; Referee: Stanislav Todorov

4 November 2018 14	Etar Veliko Tarnovo	1 – 4	Ludogorets Razgrad	Veliko Tarnovo
17:30 EET (UTC+2)	Manneh 36' (yellow card) 70'	Report	Cicinho (yellow card) 13'; Keșerü 21', 38', 54'; Marcelinho 25'	Stadium: Ivaylo Stadium; Attendance: 4,200

11 November 2018 15	Ludogorets Razgrad	1 – 0	Beroe Stara Zagora	Razgrad
16:45 EET (UTC+2)	Moți (yellow card) 66'; Góralski (yellow card) 74'; Lukoki 81'	Report	Wanderson (yellow card) 73'; Mesca (yellow card) 75'; Raynov (yellow card) 78'	Stadium: Ludogorets Arena; Attendance: 650; Referee: Radoslav Gidzhenov

24 November 2018 16	Lokomotiv Plovdiv	0 – 1	Ludogorets Razgrad	Plovdiv
17:30 EET (UTC+2)	Angelov (yellow card) 49'; Tomašević (yellow card) 87'; Posinković (yellow card) 90+4'	Report	Nedyalkov (yellow card) 13'; Natanael 58'; Campanharo (yellow card) 68'; Keșerü (yellow card) 76'; Dyakov (yellow card) 83'; João Paulo (yellow card) 90+3'	Stadium: Lokomotiv Stadium; Attendance: 460; Referee: Volen Chinkov

2 December 2018 17	Ludogorets Razgrad	3 – 0	Vitosha Bistritsa	Razgrad
14:45 EET (UTC+2)	Wanderson 13'; Sasha 15'; Nedyalkov (yellow card) 53'; Świerczok 81'	Report	Milchev (yellow card) 28'; Tsankov (yellow card) 71'	Stadium: Ludogorets Arena; Attendance: 330; Referee: Vladimir Valkov

6 December 208 18	CSKA Sofia	1 – 1	Ludogorets Razgrad	Sofia
17:30 EET (UTC+2)	Pinto (yellow card) 25'; Geferson (yellow card) 57'; Manolev (yellow card) 58'; Despodov 67'; Malinov (yellow card) 69'; Bodurov (yellow card) 90+3'	Report	Cicinho (yellow card) 11' (yellow-red card) 89'; Keșerü 29'; Marcelinho (yellow card) 82'	Stadium: Balgarska Armia Stadium; Attendance: 6,900; Referee: Nikolay Yordanov

9 December 2018 19	Ludogorets Razgrad	2 – 0	Slavia Sofia	Razgrad
17:30 EET (UTC+2)	Moți (yellow card) 33' (goal) 37'; Keșerü 55' (pen.); Marcelinho (yellow card) 79'	Report	Uzunov (yellow card) 13'; Aleksandrov (yellow card) 43'	Stadium: Ludogorets Arena; Attendance: 460; Referee: Dragomir Draganov

16 December 2018 20	Dunav Ruse	0 – 2	Ludogorets Razgrad	Ruse
12:30 EET (UTC+2)	Ahmedov (yellow card) 52'; Stanoev (yellow card) 53'; Patev (yellow card) 80'	Report	Świerczok 16'; Góralski (yellow card) 52'; Keșerü 82'	Stadium: Gradski Stadium; Attendance: 370; Referee: Nikola Popov

15 February 2019 21	Vereya	0 – 0	Ludogorets Razgrad	Stara Zagora
17:00 EET (UTC+2)	Hanyev (yellow card) 90+4'; Rudyka (yellow card) 90+5'; Stanchev (yellow card) 90+5'	Report	Forster (yellow card) 9'	Stadium: Trace Arena; Attendance: 90; Referee: Nikolay Yordanov

19 February 2019 22	Ludogorets Razgrad	1 – 1	Botev Plovdiv	Razgrad
15:00 EET (UTC+2)	Góralski (yellow card) 27'; Lukoki 47'	Report	Ebert (yellow card) 53'; Vutov 68' (yellow card) 90+4' (red card) 90+4'; Dimitrov (yellow card) 90+4'	Stadium: Ludogorets Arena; Attendance: 1,100; Referee: Stanislav Todorov

23 February 2019 23	Cherno More	1 – 0	Ludogorets Razgrad	Varna
15:00 EET (UTC+2)	Genev 13'; Enchev (yellow card) 24'; Dimov (yellow card) 52'; Vitanov (yellow card) 59'; Panov (yellow card) 90+2'; Kiki (yellow card) 90+3'	Report	Grigore (yellow card) 12'; Bakalov (yellow card) 40'; Keșerü (yellow card) 90'	Stadium: Ticha Stadium; Attendance: 850; Referee: Nikola Popov

3 March 2019 24	Ludogorets Razgrad	2 – 0	Botev Vratsa	Razgrad
15:00 EET (UTC+2)	Moți 33'; Keșerü 37'; Lukoki (yellow card) 41'	Report	Tur (yellow card) 41'	Stadium: Ludogorets Arena; Attendance: 800; Referee: Valentin Zhelezov

10 March 2019 25	Levski Sofia	0 – 2	Ludogorets Razgrad	Sofia
17:30 EET (UTC+2)	Paulinho (yellow card) 48'; Jablonský (yellow card) 79'; Thiam (yellow card) 90'	Report	Marcelinho 21' (yellow card) 40'; Wanderson (yellow card) 38'; Moți (yellow card) 45'; Grigore (yellow card) 69'; Dyakov (yellow card) 77'; Lukoki 90+2'	Stadium: Vivacom Arena Georgi Asparuhov; Attendance: 14,700; Referee: Dragomir Draganov

16 March 2019 26	Ludogorets Razgrad	6 – 0	Septemvri Sofia	Razgrad
15:15 EET (UTC+2)	Świerczok 8', 21'; Grigore 24' (pen.); Marcelinho 42', 55'; Keșerü 63'	Report	Stoichkov (yellow card) 2'; Nikolov (yellow card) 13'	Stadium: Ludogorets Arena; Attendance: 480; Referee: Ivaylo Stoyanov

==== Championship stage ====
===== League table =====
Pos	Team	Pld	W	D	L	GF	GA	GD	Pts	Qualification
1	Ludogorets Razgrad (C)	36	23	10	3	67	19	+48	79	Qualification for the Champions League first qualifying round
2	CSKA Sofia	36	24	6	6	57	17	+40	78	Qualification for the Europa League first qualifying round
3	Levski Sofia (O)	36	20	6	10	64	37	+27	66	Qualification for the European play-off final
4	Beroe	36	16	10	10	42	30	+12	58	
5	Cherno More	36	15	7	14	44	51	−7	52	
6	Botev Plovdiv	36	14	8	14	44	36	+8	50	

Source: Soccerway
Rules for classification: 1) Points; 2) Head-to-head points; 3) Head-to-head goal difference; 4) Head-to-head goals scored; 5) Head-to-head away goals scored (only if two teams); 6) Goal difference; 7) Goals scored; 8) Fairplay ranking; 9) Draw.
(C) Champions; (O) Play-off winners

===== Results summary =====
Overall								Home						Away					
Pld	W	D	L	GF	GA	GD	Pts	W	D	L	GF	GA	GD	W	D	L	GF	GA	GD
10	4	5	1	14	5	+9	17	2	3	0	8	2	+6	2	2	1	6	3	+3

Last updated: 24 May 2018.
Source: See Results

===== Results by round =====
Round	1	2	3	4	5	6	7	8	9	10
Ground	H	H	A	H	A	A	A	H	A	H
Result	D	D	W	W	L	D	D	D	W	W
Position	1	1	1	1	1	1	1	1	1	1

Source: See results
A = Away; H = Home; W = Win; D = Draw; L = Loss

===== Results =====
30 March 2019 1	Ludogorets Razgrad	0 – 0	Beroe Stara Zagora	Razgrad
18:15 EET (UTC+2)	Keșerü (yellow card) 73'	Report	Alkan (yellow card) 39'; Vasilev (yellow card) 83'; Perniš (yellow card) 90+3'	Stadium: Ludogorets Arena; Attendance: 950; Referee: Vladimir Valkov

6 April 2019 2	Ludogorets Razgrad	0 – 0	CSKA Sofia	Razgrad
17:15 EEST (UTC+3)	Dyakov (yellow card) 73'	Report	Geferson (yellow card) 71'	Stadium: Ludogorets Arena; Attendance: 6,300; Referee: Dragomir Draganov

14 April 2019 3	Levski Sofia	0 – 2	Ludogorets Razgrad	Sofia
19:00 EEST (UTC+3)	Raynov (yellow card) 35'; Cvetković (yellow card) 69'; Paulinho (yellow card) 75'; Goranov (red card) 79'	Report	Moți (yellow card) 33' (yellow-red card) 82' (goal) 80' (pen.); Keșerü 37'; Góralski (yellow card) 42'; Cicinho (yellow card) 59'	Stadium: Vasil Levski National Stadium; Attendance: 8,100; Referee: Ivaylo Stoyanov

20 April 2019 4	Ludogorets Razgrad	3 – 0	Botev Plovdiv	Razgrad
20:00 EEST (UTC+3)	Grigore 37' (pen.); Góralski (yellow card) 40'; Świerczok 45', 89'	Report	Nedelev (yellow card) 38'	Stadium: Ludogorets Arena; Attendance: 480; Referee: Dragomir Draganov

26 April 2019 5	Cherno More	2 – 1	Ludogorets Razgrad	Varna
18:15 EEST (UTC+3)	Iliev 20', 52'; Andrade (yellow card) 23'; Stanchev (yellow card) 80'	Report	Grigore 34'; Cicinho (yellow card) 47'; Świerczok (yellow card) 87'	Stadium: Ticha Stadium; Attendance: 1,600; Referee: Nikolay Yordanov

3 May 2019 6	Beroe Stara Zagora	1 – 1	Ludogorets Razgrad	Stara Zagora
20:00 EEST (UTC+3)	Ohene (yellow card) 12'; Brígido (yellow card) 50'; Meledje (yellow card) 61'; Bandalovski (yellow card) 67'; Eugénio 85' (yellow card) 89'	Report	Yusein (yellow card) 18'; Wanderson (yellow card) 38'; Moți (yellow card) 58'; Lukoki (yellow card) 64'; Abel (yellow card) 76'; Grigore 90+3'	Stadium: Beroe Stadium; Attendance: 1,400; Referee: Ivaylo Stoyanov

11 May 2019 7	CSKA Sofia	0 – 0	Ludogorets Razgrad	Sofia
20:15 EEST (UTC+3)	Geferson (yellow card) 39'; Malinov (yellow card) 64' (yellow-red card) 90+3'	Report	Świerczok (yellow card) 18'; Dyakov (yellow card) 42' (yellow-red card) 90+3'; Lukoki (yellow card) 83'	Stadium: Balgarska Armia Stadium; Attendance: 11,000; Referee: Georgi Kabakov

18 May 2019 8	Ludogorets Razgrad	1 – 1	Levski Sofia	Razgrad
18:00 EEST (UTC+3)	Grigore (yellow card) 12' (yellow-red card) 70'; Abel (yellow card) 35' (yellow-red card) 85'; Moți 50' (pen.); Popa (yellow card) 58'	Report	Raynov (yellow card) 14'; Bojinov (yellow card) 22'; Ivanov (red card) 47'; Yurukov (yellow card) 52'; Milanov 72'; Nganioni (yellow card) 90'	Stadium: Ludogorets Arena; Attendance: 4,000; Referee: Nikolay Yordanov

21 May 2019 9	Botev Plovdiv	0 – 2	Ludogorets Razgrad	Plovdiv
18:00 EEST (UTC+3)	Apostolov (yellow card) 31'; Vutov (yellow card) 63'; Dimitrov (yellow card) 73'	Report	Keșerü (yellow card) 31' (goal) 35'; Świerczok 45'; Manolev (yellow card) 54'; Góralski (yellow card) 59'	Stadium: Botev 1912 Football Complex; Attendance: 1,200; Referee: Ivaylo Stoyanov

24 May 2019 10	Ludogorets Razgrad	4 – 1	Cherno More	Razgrad
20:00 EEST (UTC+3)	Bakalov 10'; Świerczok 33', 58', 71' (yellow card) 49'; Nedyalkov (yellow card) 80'; Cicinho (yellow card) 88'	Report	Jorginho 23'; Andrade (yellow card) 55'; Stanchev (yellow card) 60'	Stadium: Ludogorets Arena; Attendance: 6,200; Referee: Volen Chinkov

=== Bulgarian Cup ===
26 September 2018 First Round	Nesebar	1 – 3	Ludogorets Razgrad	Nesebar
16:00 EEST (UTC+3)	N.Pyuskyulyu 25'; Dimov (yellow card) 38'	Report	João Paulo 36'; Lukoki (yellow card) 44' (goal) 87'; Terziev 64'	Stadium: Nesebar Stadium; Attendance: 300; Referee: Georgi Ginchev

31 October 2018 Second Round	Ludogorets Razgrad	2 – 2 (a.e.t.) (4 – 3 p)	Slavia Sofia	Razgrad
19:00 EET (UTC+2)	Świerczok 35', 74' (yellow card) 62'; Natanael (yellow card) 54'; Forster (yellow card) 116'; Campanharo (yellow card) 116'	Report	G.Ivanov 14', 77'; Yomov (yellow card) 54'; Angelov (yellow card) 57'; Karabelyov (yellow card) 74'; Petkov (yellow card) 75'; Shokolarov (yellow card) 76'; Marem (yellow card) 80'; Uzunov (yellow card) 109'	Stadium: Ludogorets Arena; Attendance: 1,100; Referee: Nikola Popov
	Penalties
	Świerczok (penalty scored); Sasha (penalty missed); Lukoki (penalty scored); Campanharo (penalty scored); Keșerü (penalty scored)		(penalty scored) Shokolarov; (penalty scored) Uzunov; (penalty scored) G.Ivanov; (penalty missed) Gamakov; (penalty missed) Yomov

3 April 2018 Quarterfinal	Ludogorets Razgrad	0 – 1	CSKA Sofia	Razgrad
18:30 EEST (UTC+3)	Moți (yellow card) 15'; Cicinho (yellow card) 45'; Manolev (yellow card) 66'; Góralski (yellow card) 68'; Grigore (yellow card) 90+1'	Report	Pinto 30' (yellow card) 56'; Bikel (yellow card) 39'; Malinov (yellow card) 61'; Tomás (yellow card) 70'; Sowe (yellow card) 77'; Evandro (yellow card) 90+2'; Černiauskas (yellow card) 90+4'	Stadium: Ludogorets Arena; Attendance: 6,000; Referee: Nikolay Yordanov

=== UEFA Champions League ===
==== Qualifying rounds ====
11 July 2018 First qualifying round 1st leg	Ludogorets Razgrad (Bulgaria)	7 – 0	(Northern Ireland) Crusaders	Razgrad, Bulgaria
20:00 EEST (UTC+3)	Keșerü (yellow card) 6', (goal) 53'; Marcelinho 25', 66'; Brown 40' (o.g.); Świerczok 73', 78', 80'	Report	Caddell (yellow card) 7'; Burns (yellow card) 14'; Beverland (yellow card) 36'; Forsythe (yellow card) 83'	Stadium: Ludogorets Arena; Attendance: 4,597; Referee: Dumitri Muntean (Moldova)

17 July 2018 First qualifying round 2nd leg	Crusaders (Northern Ireland)	0 – 2 (0 – 9 agg.)	(Bulgaria) Ludogorets Razgrad	Belfast, Northern Ireland
22:00 EEST (UTC+3)	Cushley (yellow card) 45'	Report	Brown 11' (o.g.); Świerczok 65'; Lukoki (yellow card) 76'; Terziev (yellow card) 78'	Stadium: Seaview; Attendance: 1,116; Referee: Roomer Tarajev (Estonia)

25 July 2018 Second qualifying round 1st leg	Ludogorets Razgrad (Bulgaria)	0 – 0	(Hungary) MOL Vidi	Razgrad, Bulgaria
20:00 EEST (UTC+3)		Report	Juhász (yellow card) 29'; Kovács (yellow card) 42'; Huszti (yellow card) 45+3'; Nego (yellow card) 80'	Stadium: Ludogorets Arena; Attendance: 5,327; Referee: Bojan Pandžić (Sweden)

1 August 2018 Second qualifying round 2nd leg	MOL Vidi (Hungary)	1 – 0 (1 – 0 agg.)	(Bulgaria) Ludogorets Razgrad	Felcsút, Hungary
21:00 EEST (UTC+3)	Fiola (yellow card) 37'; Hadžić 45' (yellow card) 45+2'; Huszti (yellow card) 85'; Nikolov (yellow card) 90+4'	Report	Marcelinho (yellow card) 26'; Vura (yellow card) 29' (yellow-red card) 39'; Wanderson (yellow card) 39'; Dyakov (yellow card) 71'; Góralski (yellow card) 85'; Moți (yellow card) 87'	Stadium: Pancho Aréna; Referee: Manuel Schüttengruber (Austria)
Note: Vidi played their home match at the Pancho Aréna, Felcsút, instead of their regular stadium Sóstói Stadion, Székesfehérvár, due to reconstruction.

=== UEFA Europa League ===
==== Qualifying rounds ====
9 August 2018 Third qualifying round 1st leg	Ludogorets Razgrad (Bulgaria)	1 – 0	(Bosnia and Herzegovina) Zrinjski Mostar	Razgrad, Bulgaria
20:00 EEST (UTC+3)	Moți 16'; Cicinho (yellow card) 49'	Report	Kadušić (yellow card) 60'; Laštro (yellow card) 74'	Stadium: Ludogorets Arena; Attendance: 3,574; Referee: Vitali Meshkov (Russia)

16 August 2018 Third qualifying round 2nd leg	Zrinjski Mostar (Bosnia and Herzegovina)	1 – 1 (1 – 2 agg.)	(Bulgaria) Ludogorets Razgrad	Široki Brijeg, Bosnia and Herzegovina
20:00 EEST (UTC+3)	Barišić (yellow card) 4'; Šovšić (yellow card) 40'; Bilbija 90+2'	Report	Keșerü 24'; Campanharo (yellow card) 43'	Stadium: Stadion Pecara; Attendance: 3,500; Referee: Bas Nijhuis (Netherlands)

23 August 2018 Playoff round 1st leg	Torpedo Kutaisi (Georgia (country))	0 – 1	(Bulgaria) Ludogorets Razgrad	Tbilisi, Georgia
19:00 FET (UTC+3)	Tsintsadze (yellow card) 4'; Dolidze (yellow card) 58'	Report	Cicinho (yellow card) 35'; Wanderson 45+1'; Dyakov (yellow card) 55'; Moți (yellow card) 73'	Stadium: Mikheil Meskhi Stadium; Attendance: 17,869; Referee: Hüseyin Göçek (Turkey)
Note: Torpedo Kutaisi played their play-off round home match at Mikheil Meskhi Stadium, Tbilisi, instead of their regular stadium Ramaz Shengelia Stadium, Kutaisi.

30 August 2018 Playoff round 2nd leg	Ludogorets Razgrad (Bulgaria)	4 – 0 (5 – 0 agg.)	(Georgia (country)) Torpedo Kutaisi	Razgrad, Bulgaria
20:00 FET (UTC+3)	Misidjan 6'; Campanharo 38', 59' (yellow card) 67'; Wanderson 62'; Góralski (yellow card) 75'	Report	Dolidze (yellow card) 40'; Azatskyi (yellow card) 53'; Kobakhidze (yellow card) 63'; Kukhianidze (yellow card) 84'	Stadium: Ludogorets Arena; Referee: Mattias Gestranius (Finland)

==== Group stage ====
Pos	Team	Pld	W	D	L	GF	GA	GD	Pts	Qualification
1	(Germany) Bayer Leverkusen	6	4	1	1	16	9	+7	13	Advance to knockout phase
2	(Switzerland) Zürich	6	3	1	2	7	6	+1	10	Advance to knockout phase
3	(Cyprus) AEK Larnaca	6	1	2	3	6	12	−6	5	
4	(Bulgaria) Ludogorets Razgrad	6	0	4	2	5	7	−2	4	

Source: UEFA

20 September 2018 1	Ludogorets Razgrad (Bulgaria)	2 – 3	(Germany) Bayer Leverkusen	Razgrad, Bulgaria
22:00 EEST (UTC+3)	Keșerü 8'; Marcelinho (yellow card) 20', (goal) 31'; Campanharo (yellow card) 83'; Moți (yellow card) 88'	Report	Havertz 38', 69'; L.Bender (yellow card) 44'; Kohr (yellow card) 61'; Kiese Thelin 63', (yellow card) 71'; Volland (yellow card) 85'	Stadium: Ludogorets Arena; Attendance: 8,240; Referee: Paolo Mazzoleni (Italy)

4 October 2018 2	Zürich (Switzerland)	1 – 0	(Bulgaria) Ludogorets Razgrad	Zürich, Switzerland
19:55 EEST (UTC+3)	Maxsø (yellow card) 39'; Pálsson 84'; Rodríguez (yellow card) 85'	Report	Marcelinho (yellow card) 21'; Juninho (yellow card) 37'; Dyakov (yellow card) 40'; Natanael (yellow card) 66'	Stadium: Letzigrund; Attendance: 7,092; Referee: Juan Martínez Munuera (Spain)

25 October 2018 3	AEK Larnaca (Cyprus)	1 – 1	(Bulgaria) Ludogorets Razgrad	Nicosia, Cyprus
19:55 EEST (UTC+3)	Hevel (yellow card) 20'; Larena 25' (pen.)	Report	Lukoki 7'; Natanael (yellow card) 47'; Góralski (yellow card) 90'; Cicinho (yellow card) 90+1'	Stadium: GSP Stadium; Attendance: 2,631; Referee: Enea Jorgji (Albania)

8 November 2018 4	Ludogorets Razgrad (Bulgaria)	0 – 0	(Cyprus) AEK Larnaca	Razgrad, Bulgaria
22:00 EET (UTC+2)	Campanharo (yellow card) 12'; Natanael (yellow card) 18'; Dyakov (yellow card) 42'; Moți (yellow card) 51'	Report	Giannou (yellow card) 51'; Silva (yellow card) 53'; González (yellow card) 90+2'	Stadium: Ludogorets Arena; Attendance: 4,520; Referee: Ole Hobber Nilsen (Norway)

29 November 2018 5	Bayer Leverkusen (Germany)	1 – 1	(Bulgaria) Ludogorets Razgrad	Leverkusen, Germany
19:55 EET (UTC+2)	Weiser (yellow card) 71' (goal) 85'; Thelin (yellow card) 90'	Report	Marcelinho 69'; Moți (yellow card) 90'	Stadium: BayArena; Attendance: 16,066; Referee: Dennis Higler (Netherlands)

13 December 2018 6	Ludogorets Razgrad (Bulgaria)	1 – 1	(Switzerland) Zürich	Razgrad, Bulgaria
22:00 EET (UTC+2)	Góralski (yellow card) 16'; Forster (yellow card) 18'; Świerczok 45+1'	Report	Dixon (yellow card) 1'; Odey 21'; Kryeziu (yellow card) 31'	Stadium: Ludogorets Arena; Attendance: 2,150; Referee: Kirill Levnikov (Russia)

== Squad statistics ==
As of match played 24 May 2019

=== Appearances and goals ===
No.	Pos	Nat	Player	Total		A Group		Bulgarian Cup		Supercup		Champions League		Europa League	
No.	Pos	Nat	Player	Apps	Goals	Apps	Goals	Apps	Goals	Apps	Goals	Apps	Goals	Apps	Goals
1	GK	(Argentina) ARG	Jorge Broun	11	0	5	0	2	0	0	0	1	0	3	0
3	DF	(Bulgaria) BUL	Anton Nedyalkov	46	1	34+1	1	1	0	0	0	0+1	0	7+2	0
4	DF	(Brazil) BRA	Cicinho	46	0	27+2	0	2	0	1	0	4	0	10	0
5	DF	(Bulgaria) BUL	Georgi Terziev	21	1	10+4	0	2	1	0	0	2	0	2+1	0
6	DF	(Brazil) BRA	Natanael	32	1	13+3	1	1+1	0	1	0	4	0	9	0
7	MF	(Bulgaria) BUL	Dimo Bakalov	19	2	8+5	2	2	0	0	0	0+1	0	0+3	0
8	MF	(Brazil) BRA	Lucas Sasha	27	1	9+9	1	2	0	0	0	2+1	0	2+2	0
11	DF	(Bulgaria) BUL	Stanislav Manolev	6	0	2+3	0	1	0	0	0	0	0	0	0
12	MF	(Madagascar) MAD	Anicet Abel	16	0	6+9	0	1	0	0	0	0	0	0	0
18	MF	(Bulgaria) BUL	Svetoslav Dyakov	47	0	27+3	0	1+1	0	1	0	4	0	10	0
21	DF	(Romania) ROU	Dragoș Grigore	13	4	12	4	1	0	0	0	0	0	0	0
23	GK	(Bulgaria) BUL	Plamen Iliev	12	0	12	0	0	0	0	0	0	0	0	0
28	FW	(Romania) ROU	Claudiu Keșerü	49	24	29+6	20	1+1	0	1	1	2+1	1	7+1	2
30	DF	(Romania) ROU	Cosmin Moți	43	6	28	5	1	0	1	0	4	0	9	1
33	GK	(Brazil) BRA	Renan	31	0	19	0	1	0	1	0	3	0	7	0
44	MF	(Poland) POL	Jacek Góralski	37	0	21+5	0	1	0	0	0	0+1	0	2+7	0
63	MF	(Brazil) BRA	David Ribeiro	1	0	0+1	0	0	0	0	0	0	0	0	0
64	MF	(Bulgaria) BUL	Dominik Yankov	5	0	0+3	0	1+1	0	0	0	0	0	0	0
70	FW	(Poland) POL	Jakub Świerczok	36	18	9+16	11	1	2	0+1	0	2+2	4	2+3	1
77	MF	(Romania) ROU	Adrian Popa	14	0	6+7	0	0+1	0	0	0	0	0	0	0
84	MF	(Bulgaria) BUL	Marcelinho	46	12	27+2	8	1+1	0	1	0	4	2	9+1	2
88	MF	(Brazil) BRA	Wanderson	45	8	28+1	6	2	0	1	0	3	0	10	2
90	DF	(Brazil) BRA	Rafael Forster	24	0	11+4	0	2	0	1	0	2	0	4	0
92	MF	(Democratic Republic of the Congo) COD	Jody Lukoki	43	8	22+6	6	2+1	1	0+1	0	1+2	0	5+3	1
96	MF	(Bulgaria) BUL	Serkan Yusein	9	0	6+2	0	0+1	0	0	0	0	0	0	0
Players away from the club on loan:
9	FW	(Brazil) BRA	Juninho	2	0	0	0	0	0	0	0	0	0	1+1	0
11	MF	(South Africa) RSA	May Mahlangu	7	1	1+3	1	1	0	0	0	0	0	0+2	0
37	FW	(Brazil) BRA	João Paulo	18	1	3+8	0	1	1	0+1	0	1+1	0	1+2	0
Players who appeared for Ludogorets Razgrad that left during the season:
10	MF	(Brazil) BRA	Campanharo	30	2	13+3	0	1+1	0	1	0	2+1	0	7+1	2
25	DF	(Bulgaria) BUL	Tsvetomir Panov	5	0	3	0	1	0	0	0	0+1	0	0	0
93	FW	(Netherlands) NED	Vura	13	2	5+1	1	0	0	1	0	3	0	3	1

=== Goal scorers ===
Place	Position	Nation	Number	Name	A Group	Bulgarian Cup	Supercup	Champions League	Europa League	Total
1	FW	(Romania)	28	Claudiu Keșerü	20	0	1	1	2	24
2	FW	(Poland)	70	Jakub Świerczok	11	2	0	4	1	18
3	MF	(Bulgaria)	84	Marcelinho	8	0	0	2	2	12
4	MF	(Democratic Republic of the Congo)	92	Jody Lukoki	6	1	0	0	1	8
4	MF	(Brazil)	88	Wanderson	6	0	0	0	2	8
6	DF	(Romania)	30	Cosmin Moți	5	0	0	0	1	6
7	DF	(Romania)	21	Dragoș Grigore	4	0	0	0	0	4
8	MF	(Bulgaria)	7	Dimo Bakalov	2	0	0	0	0	2
8	FW	(Netherlands)	93	Vura	1	0	0	0	1	2
8	MF	(Brazil)	10	Campanharo	0	0	0	0	2	2
8				Own goal	0	0	0	2	0	2
12	DF	(Bulgaria)	3	Anton Nedyalkov	1	0	0	0	0	1
12	MF	(South Africa)	11	May Mahlangu	1	0	0	0	0	1
12	DF	(Brazil)	6	Natanael	1	0	0	0	0	1
12	MF	(Brazil)	8	Lucas Sasha	1	0	0	0	0	1
12	FW	(Brazil)	37	João Paulo	0	1	0	0	0	1
12	DF	(Bulgaria)	5	Georgi Terziev	0	1	0	0	0	1
TOTALS					67	5	1	9	12	90

=== Disciplinary record ===
Number	Nation	Position	Name	A Group		Bulgarian Cup		Supercup		Champions League		Europa League		Total	
Number	Nation	Position	Name	Yellow card	Red card	Yellow card	Red card	Yellow card	Red card	Yellow card	Red card	Yellow card	Red card	Yellow card	Red card
3	(Bulgaria)	DF	Anton Nedyalkov	4	0	0	0	0	0	0	0	0	0	4	0
4	(Brazil)	DF	Cicinho	9	1	1	0	0	0	0	0	3	0	13	1
5	(Bulgaria)	DF	Georgi Terziev	0	0	0	0	0	0	1	0	0	0	1	0
6	(Brazil)	DF	Natanael	1	0	1	0	0	0	0	0	3	0	5	0
7	(Bulgaria)	MF	Dimo Bakalov	2	0	0	0	0	0	0	0	0	0	2	0
11	(Bulgaria)	DF	Stanislav Manolev	1	0	1	0	0	0	0	0	0	0	2	0
12	(Madagascar)	MF	Anicet Abel	3	1	0	0	0	0	0	0	0	0	3	1
18	(Bulgaria)	MF	Svetoslav Dyakov	10	1	0	0	1	0	1	0	3	0	15	1
21	(Romania)	DF	Dragoș Grigore	4	1	1	0	0	0	0	0	0	0	5	1
28	(Romania)	FW	Claudiu Keșerü	5	0	0	0	0	0	1	0	0	0	6	0
30	(Romania)	DF	Cosmin Moți	12	1	1	0	0	0	1	0	4	0	18	1
33	(Brazil)	GK	Renan	1	0	0	0	0	0	0	0	0	0	1	0
44	(Poland)	MF	Jacek Góralski	8	0	1	0	0	0	1	0	3	0	13	0
70	(Poland)	FW	Jakub Świerczok	4	0	1	0	0	0	0	0	0	0	5	0
77	(Romania)	MF	Adrian Popa	1	0	0	0	0	0	0	0	0	0	1	0
84	(Bulgaria)	MF	Marcelinho	6	0	0	0	0	0	1	0	2	0	9	0
88	(Brazil)	MF	Wanderson	2	0	0	0	0	0	1	0	0	0	3	0
90	(Brazil)	DF	Rafael Forster	1	0	1	0	0	0	0	0	1	0	3	0
92	(Democratic Republic of the Congo)	MF	Jody Lukoki	7	0	1	0	0	0	1	0	0	0	9	0
96	(Bulgaria)	MF	Serkan Yusein	1	0	0	0	0	0	0	0	0	0	1	0
Players away on loan:
9	(Brazil)	FW	Juninho	0	0	0	0	0	0	0	0	1	0	1	0
37	(Brazil)	FW	João Paulo	2	0	0	0	0	0	0	0	0	0	2	0
Players who left Ludogorets Razgrad during the season:
10	(Brazil)	MF	Campanharo	1	0	0	0	1	0	0	0	4	0	6	0
93	(Netherlands)	FW	Vura	0	0	0	0	0	0	2	1	0	0	2	1
			TOTALS	85	5	9	0	2	0	10	0	24	0	130	6
