= 2017–18 PFC Ludogorets Razgrad season =

Ludogorets Razgrad
2017–18 season
- Chairman: Aleksandar Aleksandrov
- Manager: Georgi Dermendzhiev
- A Group: 1st
- Bulgarian Cup: Quarter-finals (vs. CSKA Sofia)
- Supercup: Runners-up
- Champions League: Third qualifying round (vs. Hapoel Be'er Sheva)
- Europa League: Round of 32 (vs. Milan)
- Top goalscorer: League: Claudiu Keșerü (26); All: Claudiu Keșerü (30)
Home colours	Away colours	Third colours

The 2017–18 season is Ludogorets Razgrad's seventh consecutive season in the Bulgarian First League, of which they are defending champions. They will also take part in the Bulgarian Cup, Supercup and will enter the UEFA Champions League second qualifying round.

== Squad ==
As of match played 20 May 2018

No.	Name	Nationality	Position	Date of birth (age)	Signed from	Signed in	Contract ends	Apps.	Goals
Goalkeepers
1	Jorge Broun	(Argentina)	GK	23 May 1986 (aged 31)	Colón	2017		29	0
21	Vladislav Stoyanov	(Bulgaria)	GK	8 June 1987 (aged 30)	Sheriff Tiraspol	2013		124	0
33	Renan	(Brazil)	GK	18 May 1989 (aged 29)	Avaí	2017		35	0
69	Damyan Damyanov	(Bulgaria)	GK	29 July 2000 (aged 17)	Youth Team	2016		1	0
Defenders
2	Rafael Forster	(Brazil)	DF	23 July 1990 (aged 27)	Zorya Luhansk	2017		9	0
4	Cicinho	(Brazil)	DF	26 December 1988 (aged 29)	Santos	2015		70	1
5	Georgi Terziev	(Bulgaria)	DF	18 April 1992 (aged 26)	Chernomorets Burgas	2013		93	3
6	Natanael	(Brazil)	DF	25 December 1990 (aged 27)	Athletico Paranaense	2015		109	5
19	Aleksandar Vasilev	(Bulgaria)	DF	27 April 1995 (aged 23)	Kaliakra Kavarna	2014		34	2
23	Ventsislav Kerchev	(Bulgaria)	DF	2 June 1997 (aged 20)	Youth Team	2014		26	2
25	Tsvetomir Panov	(Bulgaria)	DF	17 April 1989 (aged 29)	Botev Plovdiv	2018		6	0
27	Cosmin Moți	(Romania)	DF	3 December 1984 (aged 33)	Dinamo București	2012		215	25
32	Ihor Plastun	(Ukraine)	DF	20 August 1990 (aged 27)	Karpaty Lviv	2016		76	5
55	Lachezar Kovachev	(Bulgaria)	DF	24 March 1999 (aged 19)	Youth Team	2017		1	0
58	Dimitar Iliev	(Bulgaria)	DF	22 June 1999 (aged 18)	Youth Team	2017		1	0
75	Martin Milkov	(Bulgaria)	DF	25 December 1999 (aged 18)	Youth Team	2017		1	0
87	Preslav Petrov	(Bulgaria)	DF	1 May 1995 (aged 23)	Vidima-Rakovski	2014		8	0
Midfielders
8	Lucas Sasha	(Brazil)	MF	1 March 1990 (aged 28)	Hapoel Tel Aviv	2015		99	5
10	Campanharo	(Brazil)	MF	4 April 1992 (aged 26)	Bragantino	2016		74	9
12	Anicet Abel	(Madagascar)	MF	13 March 1990 (aged 28)	Botev Plovdiv	2014		136	12
18	Svetoslav Dyakov	(Bulgaria)	MF	31 May 1984 (aged 33)	Lokomotiv Sofia	2012		249	11
34	Oleg Dimitrov	(Bulgaria)	MF	6 March 1996 (aged 22)	Youth Team	2015		6	0
38	Kristiyan Kitov	(Bulgaria)	MF	14 October 1996 (aged 21)	CSKA Sofia	2012		6	0
44	Jacek Góralski	(Poland)	MF	21 September 1992 (aged 25)	Jagiellonia Białystok	2017		33	0
45	Ivaylo Klimentov	(Bulgaria)	MF	3 February 1998 (aged 20)	Youth Team	2015		6	1
64	Dominik Yankov	(Bulgaria)	MF	13 July 2000 (aged 17)	Sunderland	2017		3	0
72	Erol Dost	(Bulgaria)	MF	30 May 1999 (aged 18)	Youth Team	2017		3	1
77	Georgi Valchev	(Bulgaria)	MF	5 February 2000 (aged 18)	Youth Team	2017		3	1
80	Denislav Aleksandrov	(Bulgaria)	MF	19 July 1997 (aged 20)	Youth Team	2014		10	1
84	Marcelinho	(Bulgaria)	MF	24 August 1984 (aged 33)	Bragantino	2011		270	79
88	Wanderson	(Brazil)	MF	2 January 1988 (aged 30)	Portuguesa	2014		158	52
92	Jody Lukoki	(Democratic Republic of the Congo)	MF	15 November 1992 (aged 25)	PEC Zwolle	2015		87	12
97	Tomas Tsvyatkov	(Bulgaria)	MF	1 June 1997 (aged 20)	Youth Team	2016		3	1
98	Svetoslav Kovachev	(Bulgaria)	MF	14 March 1998 (aged 20)	Youth Team	2015		13	2
Forwards
28	Claudiu Keșerü	(Romania)	FW	2 December 1986 (aged 31)	Al-Gharafa	2015		118	77
70	Jakub Świerczok	(Poland)	FW	28 December 1982 (aged 35)	Zagłębie Lubin	2017		14	7
93	Vura	(Netherlands)	FW	24 July 1993 (aged 24)	Willem II	2013		188	47
Players away on loan
29	Daniel Naumov	(Bulgaria)	GK	29 March 1998 (aged 20)	Youth Team	2016		0	0
37	João Paulo	(Brazil)	FW	2 June 1988 (aged 29)	Botev Plovdiv	2017		32	5
Players who left during the season
11	Juninho Quixadá	(Brazil)	FW	12 December 1985 (aged 32)	Bragantino	2011		175	42
22	Jonathan Cafú	(Brazil)	FW	10 July 1991 (aged 26)	São Paulo	2015		74	21

=== Out on loan ===
Note: Flags indicate national team as defined under FIFA eligibility rules; some limited exceptions apply. Players may hold more than one non-FIFA nationality.

No. / Pos. / Nation / Player; 29 / GK / BUL / Daniel Naumov (at Vereya until 30 June 2018)	No. / Pos. / Nation / Player; 37 / FW / BRA / João Paulo (at Botev Plovdiv until 30 June 2018)

== Transfers ==
=== Summer ===
In: Note: Flags indicate national team as defined under FIFA eligibility rules; some limited exceptions apply. Players may hold more than one non-FIFA nationality.

No.	Pos.	Nation	Player
1	GK	ARG	Jorge Broun (from (Argentina) Rosario Central)
2	DF	BRA	Rafael Forster (from (Ukraine) Zorya Luhansk)
5	DF	BUL	Georgi Terziev (loan return from (Croatia) Hajduk Split)
23	DF	BUL	Ventsislav Kerchev (loan return from (Bulgaria) Lokomotiv GO)
44	MF	POL	Jacek Góralski (from (Poland) Jagiellonia Białystok)

Out: Note: Flags indicate national team as defined under FIFA eligibility rules; some limited exceptions apply. Players may hold more than one non-FIFA nationality.

No.	Pos.	Nation	Player
5	DF	ARG	José Palomino (to (Italy) Atalanta)
13	MF	BUL	Veselin Lyubomirov (to (Bulgaria) Lokomotiv GO)
16	DF	COL	Brayan Angulo (to (Mexico) Puebla, previously on loan at (Mexico) Chiapas)
17	FW	BUL	Tsvetelin Chunchukov (to (Bulgaria) Cherno More)
22	FW	BRA	Jonathan Cafu (to (France) Bordeaux)
25	DF	BUL	Yordan Minev (to (Bulgaria) Botev Plovdiv)
33	GK	BUL	Georgi Argilashki (to (Bulgaria) Vereya, previously on loan)
77	DF	POR	Vitinha (to (Bulgaria) Cherno More)
99	GK	CAN	Milan Borjan (to (Serbia) Red Star, previously on loan at (Poland) Korona Kielce)

=== Winter ===
In: Note: Flags indicate national team as defined under FIFA eligibility rules; some limited exceptions apply. Players may hold more than one non-FIFA nationality.

No.	Pos.	Nation	Player
25	DF	BUL	Tsvetomir Panov (from (Bulgaria) Botev Plovdiv)
70	FW	POL	Jakub Świerczok (from (Poland) Zagłębie Lubin)

Out: Note: Flags indicate national team as defined under FIFA eligibility rules; some limited exceptions apply. Players may hold more than one non-FIFA nationality.

No.	Pos.	Nation	Player
11	FW	BRA	Juninho Quixadá (to (Brazil) Ferroviário)
29	GK	BUL	Daniel Naumov (loan to (Bulgaria) Vereya)
37	FW	BRA	João Paulo (on loan to (Bulgaria) Botev Plovdiv)

== Friendlies ==
16 June 2017	Rodopa Smolyan	0–8	Ludogorets Razgrad	Smolyan
EEST (UTC+3)		Report	Keșerü 6'; Cicinho 40'; João Paulo 50', 55' (pen.); Cafu 68', 90+'; Palomino 66'	Stadium: Septemvri Stadium; Attendance: 300

17 June 2017	Eurocollege Plovdiv	0–15	Ludogorets Razgrad	Smolyan
EEST (UTC+3)		Report	T.Petrov; Aleksandrov; Vura,, Cafu, Keșerü, Wanderson; Campanharo; João Paulo; Sasha; Juninho Quixadá; Palomino	Stadium: Septemvri Stadium

22 June 2017	Ludogorets Razgrad (Bulgaria)	2–0	(Azerbaijan) Gabala	Austria
20:00 EEST (UTC+3)	João Paulo 37'; Lukoki 73'	Report

24 June 2017	Ludogorets Razgrad (Bulgaria)	1–0	(Russia) Zenit St.Petersburg	Austria
EEST (UTC+3)	Cicinho 23'	Report

26 June 2017	Ludogorets Razgrad (Bulgaria)	1–1	(Greece) Olympiacos	Austria
20:00 EEST (UTC+3)	Marcelinho 44'	Report	Fortounis 34'

== Competitions ==
=== Bulgarian Supercup ===
9 August 2017	Ludogorets Razgrad	1–1 (a.e.t.) (4–5 p)	Botev Plovdiv	Burgas
20:00 EEST (UTC+3)	Keșerü (yellow card) 24'; Natanael (yellow card) 38'; Wanderson 47'; Dyakov (yellow card) 60'	Report	Dimov (yellow card) 12'; Nedelev 16'; Brisola (yellow card) 38'; Meledje (yellow card) 69'	Stadium: Stadion Lazur; Attendance: 1,800; Referee: Stanislav Todorov
	Penalties
	Marcelinho (penalty missed); Wanderson (penalty scored); Natanael (penalty scored); Anicet (penalty scored); Moți (penalty scored)		(penalty scored) Baltanov; (penalty scored) Viana; (penalty scored) Genev; (penalty scored) Brisola; (penalty scored) Dimov

=== A Football Group ===
==== Regular stage ====
===== League table =====
Pos	Team	Pld	W	D	L	GF	GA	GD	Pts	Qualification
1	Ludogorets Razgrad	26	21	3	2	63	13	+50	66	Qualification for the Championship round
2	CSKA Sofia	26	19	6	1	59	14	+45	63	Qualification for the Championship round
3	Levski Sofia	26	14	8	4	37	14	+23	50	Qualification for the Championship round
4	Beroe	26	12	9	5	33	24	+9	45	Qualification for the Championship round
5	Botev Plovdiv	26	11	9	6	44	29	+15	42	Qualification for the Championship round

Source: Soccerway
Rules for classification: 1) Points; 2) Head-to-head points; 3) Head-to-head goal difference; 4) Head-to-head goals scored; 5) Head-to-head away goals scored (only if two teams); 6) Goal difference; 7) Goals scored; 8) Fairplay ranking; 9) Draw.

===== Results summary =====
Overall								Home						Away					
Pld	W	D	L	GF	GA	GD	Pts	W	D	L	GF	GA	GD	W	D	L	GF	GA	GD
26	21	3	2	63	13	+50	66	10	2	1	28	7	+21	11	1	1	35	6	+29

Last updated: 18 March 2018.
Source: See Results

===== Results by round =====
Round	1	2	3	4	5	6	7	8	9	10	11	12	13	14	15	16	17	18	19	20	21	22	23	24	25	26
Ground	A	H	A	H	A	H	A	A	H	A	H	A	H	H	H	A	H	A	H	A	H	A	H	A	H	A
Result	W	D	W	W	W	D	D	W	W	W	W	W	W	W	L	W	W	L	W	W	W	W	W	W	W	W
Position	6	3	2	2	2	2	2	2	2	2	1	1	1	1	1	1	1	1	1	1	1	1	1	1	1	1

Source: See results
A = Away; H = Home; W = Win; D = Draw; L = Loss

===== Results =====
22 July 2017 2	CSKA Sofia	0–1	Ludogorets Razgrad	Sofia
21:00 EEST (UTC+3)	Manolev (yellow card) 9'; Malinov (yellow card) 38'; Karanga (yellow card) 40'; Mercado (yellow card) 45+1' (yellow-red card) 58'; Nedyalkov (yellow card) 54'; Chorbadzhiyski (yellow card) 90+2'	Report	Vura (yellow card) 32', (goal) 49'; Lukoki (yellow card) 54'; Quixadá (yellow card) 65'; Broun (yellow card) 76'; Natanael (yellow card) 87'; Dyakov (yellow card) 89'	Stadium: Stadion Balgarska Armia; Attendance: 7,300; Referee: Ivaylo Stoyanov

29 July 2017 3	Ludogorets Razgrad	0–0	Lokomotiv Plovdiv	Razgrad
21:00 EEST (UTC+3)		Report	Teles (yellow card) 32'; Pirgov (yellow card) 90+3'	Stadium: Ludogorets Arena; Attendance: 800; Referee: Volen Chinkov

5 August 2017 4	Vitosha Bistritsa	2–4	Ludogorets Razgrad	Sofia
21:00 EEST (UTC+3)	Dolapchiev 4', 36'; Popov (yellow card) 35'; Gyonov (yellow card) 71'; Varbanov (yellow card) 75'	Report	Vura 12'; Cicinho (yellow card) 33'; Moți 38' (pen.); Campanharo 73'; Quixadá (yellow card) 75', (goal) 85'	Stadium: Natsionalen stadion Vasil Levski; Attendance: 150; Referee: Dragomir Draganov

12 August 2017 5	Ludogorets Razgrad	3–1	Vereya	Razgrad
21:00 EEST (UTC+3)	Keșerü 25', 30'; Abel 58'; Lukoki (yellow card) 89'	Report	Bengyuzov (yellow card) 31'; Andonov 41'; Iliev (yellow card) 60'; Domovchiyski (yellow card) 66'; Nurgaliyev (yellow card) 90+1'	Stadium: Ludogorets Arena; Attendance: 850; Referee: Georgi Davidov

20 August 2017 6	Dunav Ruse	0–5	Ludogorets Razgrad	Ruse
21:00 EEST (UTC+3)	Popadiyn (yellow card) 17'; Patev (yellow card) 61'; Karagaren (yellow card) 79'	Report	Vura 23', (yellow card) 61'; Marcelinho 37'; Popadiyn 41' (o.g.); Vasilev (yellow card) 56'; Quixadá 73'; Lukoki 84'	Stadium: Gradski stadion Attendance: 3,100; Referee: Georgi Dimitrov

27 August 2017 7	Ludogorets Razgrad	1–1	Pirin Blagoevgrad	Razgrad
21:00 EEST (UTC+3)	Abel 61'; Moți (yellow card) 86'	Report	Blagov (yellow card) 32'; Nichev (yellow card) 58'; Souda (yellow card) 60'; Kostov 87'	Stadium: Ludogorets Arena; Attendance: 700; Referee: Dragomir Draganov

6 September 2017 1	Levski Sofia	0–0	Ludogorets Razgrad	Sofia
20:00 EEST (UTC+3)	Mitrev (red card) 35'; Procházka (yellow card) 77'; Cvetković (yellow card) 88'	Report	Abel (yellow card) 28'; Natanael (yellow card) 31'; Dyakov (yellow card) 76'; Cicinho (red card) 79'	Stadium: Vivacom Arena - Georgi Asparuhov; Attendance: 14,000; Referee: Nikola Popov

9 September 2017 8	Slavia Sofia	0–4	Ludogorets Razgrad	Sofia
20:00 EEST (UTC+3)	Velkov (yellow card) 19'; Martinov (yellow card) 22'; Hristov (yellow card) 84'	Report	Keșerü 4', 20' (pen.); Campanharo (yellow card) 40'; Vura 49'; Quixadá 75'	Stadium: Natsionalen stadion Vasil Levski; Attendance: 80; Referee: Georgi Davidov

18 September 2017 9	Ludogorets Razgrad	2–1	Botev Plovdiv	Razgrad
20:00 EEST (UTC+3)	Marcelinho 47'; Terziev (yellow card) 56'; Plastun 80'; Campanharo (yellow card) 81'	Report	Baltanov 6' (pen.); Viana (yellow card) 25'; Yusein (yellow card) 54'; Meledje (yellow card) 55'; Brisola (yellow card) 68'; Panov (yellow card) 78'	Stadium: Ludogorets Arena; Attendance: 600; Referee: Nikolay Yordanov

24 September 2017 10	Septemvri Sofia	1–4	Ludogorets Razgrad	Sofia
20:00 EEST (UTC+3)	Gadi 45'	Report	Natanael 54'; Lukoki 56', 88'; Wanderson 85'	Stadium: Natsionalen stadion Vasil Levski; Attendance: 50; Referee: Georgi Kabakov

1 October 2017 11	Ludogorets Razgrad	2–0	Beroe	Razgrad
20:00 EEST (UTC+3)	Marcelinho 23'; Lukoki 86'	Report	Raynov (yellow card) 41'	Stadium: Ludogorets Arena; Attendance: 600; Referee: Volen Chinkov

14 October 2017 12	Cherno More	0–1	Ludogorets Razgrad	Varna
20:00 EEST (UTC+3)	Zehirov (yellow card) 27'; Milanov (yellow card) 52'; Iliev (yellow card) 60'; Ognyanov (yellow card) 87'	Report	Marcelinho 7'; João Paulo (yellow card) 38'; Wanderson (yellow card) 60'	Stadium: Stadion Ticha; Attendance: 4,000; Referee: Ivaylo Stoyanov

23 October 2017 13	Ludogorets Razgrad	4–0	Etar	Razgrad
18:00 EEST (UTC+3)	Keșerü 24', 59', 84'; Vura 66'; Natanael (yellow card) 80'; Cicinho (yellow card) 90+3'	Report	Badará (yellow card) 41'; Apostolov (yellow card) 71'; Skerlev (yellow card) 90+3'; Rumenov (yellow card) 90+3'	Stadium: Ludogorets Arena; Attendance: 700; Referee: Nikola Popov

29 October 2017 14	Ludogorets Razgrad	2–0	Levski Sofia	Razgrad
18:15 EET (UTC+2)	Vura 11', (yellow card) 41'; Wanderson 59'; Góralski (yellow card) 80'	Report	Orachev (yellow card) 18'; Panayotov (yellow card) 45+1'; Cabral (yellow card) 67'; Naydenov (yellow card) 82'	Stadium: Ludogorets Arena; Attendance: 4,400; Referee: Volen Chinkov

5 November 2017 15	Ludogorets Razgrad	1–2	CSKA Sofia	Razgrad
18:00 EET (UTC+2)	Campanharo 49'; Lukoki (yellow card) 51'; Cicinho (yellow card) 87'; Keșerü (yellow card) 90+1'	Report	Culma (yellow card) 16'; Karanga (yellow card) 56' (yellow-red card) 67', (goal) 58'; Atanasov (yellow card) 59'; Mercado 71'; Černiauskas (yellow card) 90+3'; Dyulgerov (yellow card) 90+5'; Malinov (yellow card) 90+6'	Stadium: Ludogorets Arena; Attendance: 5,700; Referee: Dragomir Draganov

18 November 2017 16	Lokomotiv Plovdiv	0–3	Ludogorets Razgrad	Plovdiv
17:30 EET (UTC+2)	Muhammed (yellow card) 30'; Bakalov (yellow card) 40'; Kiki (yellow card) 65'; Nikolov (red card) 66'	Report	Keșerü 14'; Marcelinho 17'; Cicinho (yellow card) 35'; Abel (yellow card) 68'; João Paulo 90+1'	Stadium: Stadion Lokomotiv; Attendance: 800; Referee: Stefan Apostolov

27 November 2017 17	Ludogorets Razgrad	3–0	Vitosha Bistritsa	Razgrad
17:30 EET (UTC+2)	Keșerü (yellow card) 41', (goal) 52'; Vura (yellow card) 47', (goal) 64'; Campanharo 68'; Terziev (yellow card) 71'	Report	Mutafchiyski (yellow card) 19'; Kutev (yellow card) 48' (yellow-red card) 63'	Stadium: Ludogorets Arena; Attendance: 370; Referee: Vladimir Valkov

30 November 2017 18	Vereya	2–1	Ludogorets Razgrad	Stara Zagora
15:00 EET (UTC+2)	Isa 12'; Elias (yellow card) 38'; Vitanov (yellow card) 48'; Kerkar 83'; Kolev (yellow card) 90+2'	Report	Moți (yellow card) 22', (goal) 24'; Dyakov (yellow card) 87'	Stadium: Trace Arena; Attendance: 280; Referee: Nedelcho Gadzhalov

4 December 2017 19	Ludogorets Razgrad	2–0	Dunav Ruse	Razgrad
17:30 EET (UTC+2)	Marcelinho 34', 36'; Natanael (yellow card) 62'; Dyakov (yellow card) 78'	Report	Vasev (yellow card) 27'; Jatobá (yellow card) 70'; Budinov (yellow card) 88'	Stadium: Ludogorets Arena; Attendance: 170; Referee: Stefan Pavlov

11 December 2017 20	Pirin Blagoevgrad	0–2	Ludogorets Razgrad	Blagoevgrad
17:30 EET (UTC+2)	Kostadinov (yellow card) 30'	Report	Lukoki (yellow card) 29', (goal) 33'; Keșerü 31'	Stadium: Stadion Hristo Botev; Attendance: 550; Referee: Nikola Popov

16 February 2018 21	Ludogorets Razgrad	4–1	Slavia Sofia	Razgrad
15:00 EET (UTC+2)	Vura (yellow card) 15'; Keșerü 24', 35'; Abel 37'; Wanderson 52'	Report	Milev (yellow card) 7'; Velev 33', (yellow card) 87'; Ivanov (yellow card) 72'; Shokolarov (yellow card) 90+3'	Stadium: Ludogorets Arena; Attendance: 550; Referee: Nikola Popov

27 February 2018 22	Botev Plovdiv	1–3	Ludogorets Razgrad	Plovdiv
17:30 EET (UTC+2)	Campos 31'; N'Dongala (yellow card) 34'; Dimov (yellow card) 54'; Marin (yellow card) 58'	Report	Keșerü 5'; Vura 29'; Abel (yellow card) 40', (goal) 45+1'; Cicinho (yellow card) 48'; Dyakov (yellow card) 90+3'	Stadium: Futbolen kompleks Botev 1912; Attendance: 470; Referee: Ivaylo Stoyanov

3 March 2018 23	Ludogorets Razgrad	1–0	Septemvri Sofia	Razgrad
17:30 EET (UTC+2)	Keșerü (yellow card) 79', (goal) 90+4' (pen.); Marcelinho (yellow card) 90+2'	Report	Baidoo (yellow card) 38'; Galchev (yellow card) 79' (yellow-red card) 87'; Galev (yellow card) 90+3'; Stoyanov (yellow card) 90+3'	Stadium: Ludogorets Arena; Attendance: 550; Referee: Volen Chinkov

6 March 2018 24	Beroe	0–1	Ludogorets Razgrad	Stara Zagora
17:30 EET (UTC+2)	Hadzhiev (yellow card) 35'; Leoni (yellow card) 56'; Adamović (yellow card) 63'; Bandalovski (yellow card) 67'; Raynov (yellow card) 70'	Report	Lukoki (yellow card) 30'; Marcelinho (yellow card) 52', (goal) 80'; Dyakov (yellow card) 78'; Moți (yellow card) 90+4'	Stadium: Stadion Beroe; Attendance: 650; Referee: Dragomir Draganov

10 March 2018 25	Ludogorets Razgrad	3–1	Cherno More	Razgrad
17:30 EET (UTC+2)	Wanderson 8'; Marcelinho 14'; Dyakov (yellow card) 35'; Vura 41'; Moți (yellow card) 48'; Góralski (yellow card) 88'	Report	Kiki 32'; Tsvetkov (yellow card) 78'; Konongo (yellow card) 87'; Vasilev (yellow card) 90'	Stadium: Ludogorets Arena; Attendance: 900; Referee: Nikola Popov

18 March 2018 26	Etar	0–6	Ludogorets Razgrad	Veliko Tarnovo
18:15 EET (UTC+2)	Batrović (yellow card) 35'; Pashov (yellow card) 47'; Galabov (yellow card) 60'; Manneh (yellow card) 89'	Report	Keșerü 5', 74'; Vura 23', 39'; Cicinho (yellow card) 36'; Abel 58'; Moți (yellow card) 79'; Świerczok 87'; Natanael (yellow card) 87'	Stadium: Stadion Ivaylo; Attendance: 2,100; Referee: Stanislav Todorov

==== Championship stage ====
===== League table =====
Pos	Team	Pld	W	D	L	GF	GA	GD	Pts	Qualification
1	Ludogorets Razgrad (C)	36	27	7	2	91	22	+69	88	Qualification for the Champions League first qualifying round
2	CSKA Sofia	36	24	9	3	80	26	+54	81	Qualification for the Europa League first qualifying round
3	Levski Sofia (O)	36	18	10	8	55	27	+28	64	Qualification for the European play-off final
4	Beroe	36	16	11	9	45	43	+2	59	
5	Botev Plovdiv	36	15	11	10	62	49	+13	56	
6	Vereya	36	10	6	20	27	61	−34	36	

Source: Soccerway
Rules for classification: 1) Points; 2) Head-to-head points; 3) Head-to-head goal difference; 4) Head-to-head goals scored; 5) Head-to-head away goals scored (only if two teams); 6) Goal difference; 7) Goals scored; 8) Fairplay ranking; 9) Draw.
(C) Champions; (O) Play-off winners

===== Results summary =====
Overall								Home						Away					
Pld	W	D	L	GF	GA	GD	Pts	W	D	L	GF	GA	GD	W	D	L	GF	GA	GD
10	6	4	0	28	9	+19	22	3	2	0	19	6	+13	3	2	0	9	3	+6

Last updated: 20 May 2018.
Source: See Results

===== Results by round =====
Round	1	2	3	4	5	6	7	8	9	10
Ground	H	H	A	H	A	A	A	H	A	H
Result	W	W	W	W	W	W	D	D	D	D
Position	1	1	1	1	1	1	1	1	1	1

Source: See results
A = Away; H = Home; W = Win; D = Draw; L = Loss

===== Results =====
31 March 2018 27	Ludogorets Razgrad	5–0	Vereya	Razgrad
17:30 EEST (UTC+3)	Keșerü 41' (pen.), 72'; Lukoki 42'; Świerczok 84', 90+1'	Report	Domovchiyski (yellow card) 27'; Andonov (yellow card) 41'; Ndong (yellow card) 62'; Minev (yellow card) 71'	Stadium: Ludogorets Arena; Attendance: 550; Referee: Dragomir Draganov

6 April 2018 28	Ludogorets Razgrad	3–2	CSKA Sofia	Razgrad
17:00 EEST (UTC+3)	Świerczok 51', 88', (yellow card) 90+2'; Dyakov (yellow card) 57'; Keșerü 85'; Campanharo (yellow card) 85'; Marcelinho (yellow card) 90'; Vura (yellow card) 90+1'	Report	Despodov 45+2'; Geferson (yellow card) 54' (yellow-red card) 56'; Henrique (yellow card) 57'; Karanga (yellow card) 58'; Pinto 71'; Manolev (yellow card) 80'; Bodurov (yellow card) 90+1'	Stadium: Ludogorets Arena; Attendance: 6,700; Referee: Stanislav Todorov

14 April 2018 29	Levski Sofia	0–1	Ludogorets Razgrad	Sofia
20:00 EEST (UTC+3)	Jablonský (yellow card) 40'; Thiam (yellow card) 56'	Report	Cicinho (yellow card) 26'; Sasha (yellow card) 71'; Keșerü 83'; Natanael (yellow card) 86'; Forster (yellow card) 90+1'	Stadium: Vivacom Arena - Georgi Asparuhov; Attendance: 5,200; Referee: Nikola Popov

18 April 2018 30	Ludogorets Razgrad	7–0	Beroe	Razgrad
20:30 EEST (UTC+3)	Wanderson 2'; Keșerü 16' (pen.), 30', 76'; Vura 61'; Lukoki 71', (yellow card) 79'; Campanharo 88'	Report	Negruț (yellow card) 19'	Stadium: Ludogorets Arena; Attendance: 2,200; Referee: Nikolay Yordanov

21 April 2018 31	Botev Plovdiv	2–4	Ludogorets Razgrad	Plovdiv
17:30 EEST (UTC+3)	Campos 4'; Georgiev 41'; Terziev (yellow card) 48'; Álvaro (yellow card) 59'	Report	Wanderson 23'; Keșerü 29'; Góralski (yellow card) 38'; Świerczok (yellow card) 59', (goal) 78'; Dyakov (yellow card) 69' (yellow-red card) 88'; Plastun 72'	Stadium: Futbolen kompleks Botev 1912; Attendance: 1,900; Referee: Volen Chinkov

27 April 2018 32	Vereya	0–3	Ludogorets Razgrad	Stara Zagora
20:00 EEST (UTC+3)	Iliev (yellow card) 24' (yellow-red card) 53'; Ivanov (yellow card) 34'; Andonov (red card) 83'	Report	Natanael (yellow card) 6'; Góralski (yellow card) 26'; Moți (yellow card) 59'; Świerczok 67'; Keșerü 77'; Wanderson 90+1'	Stadium: Trace Arena; Attendance: 190; Referee: Ivaylo Stoyanov

5 May 2018 33	CSKA Sofia	0–0	Ludogorets Razgrad	Sofia
20:00 EEST (UTC+3)	Atanasov (yellow card) 68'	Report	Cicinho (yellow card) 18'; Forster (yellow card) 41'	Stadium: Stadion Balgarska Armia; Attendance: 29,000; Referee: Nikola Popov

12 May 2018 34	Ludogorets Razgrad	2–2	Levski Sofia	Razgrad
18:00 EEST (UTC+3)	Keșerü 5' (pen.); Góralski (yellow card) 13'; Belaïd 84' (o.g.); Vura (yellow card) 86'	Report	Jablonský (yellow card) 8'; Naydenov (yellow card) 53'; Procházka 73'; Cabral 88'	Stadium: Ludogorets Arena; Attendance: 7,400; Referee: Georgi Kabakov

15 May 2018 35	Beroe	1–1	Ludogorets Razgrad	Stara Zagora
18:30 EEST (UTC+3)	Kamburov 67'; Tsonev (yellow card) 78'	Report	Aleksandrov 65'; Forster (yellow card) 78'; Świerczok (yellow card) 90+3'	Stadium: Stadion Beroe; Attendance: 1,500; Referee: Valentin Zhelezov

20 May 2018 36	Ludogorets Razgrad	2–2	Botev Plovdiv	Razgrad
17:30 EEST (UTC+3)	Klimentov 37'; Dost (yellow card) 59', (goal) 76'; Yankov (yellow card) 67'	Report	N'Dongala 54'; Terziev 57'; Gustavo (yellow card) 69'	Stadium: Ludogorets Arena; Attendance: 600; Referee: Radoslav Gidzhenov

=== Bulgarian Cup ===
21 September 2017 First Round	Oborishte Panagyurishte	2–3 (a.e.t.)	Ludogorets Razgrad	Panagyurishte
16:00 EEST (UTC+3)	Lucas (yellow card) 19', (goal) 119'; Andonov (yellow card) 27'; Vasilev (yellow card) 82'; Nando (yellow card) 83'; Netov 77'	Report	Góralski (yellow card) 13' (yellow-red card) 95'; Quixadá 38'; Campanharo (yellow card) 89'; Keșerü 98', 114'	Stadium: Stadion Orcho Voyvoda; Attendance: 750; Referee: Vladimir Valkov

26 October 2017 Second Round	Ludogorets Razgrad	1–1 (a.e.t.) (4–3 p)	Beroe	Razgrad
19:00 EEST (UTC+3)	Campanharo 36' (pen.); Vura (yellow card) 90+1'	Report	Hadzhiev 24'; Zhelev (yellow card) 64'; Perniš (yellow card) 81'; Raynov (yellow card) 87'; Ohene (yellow card) 95'	Stadium: Ludogorets Arena; Attendance: 480; Referee: Georgi Dimitrov
	Penalties
	Keșerü (penalty scored); Campanharo (penalty scored); Sasha (penalty scored); Vasilev (penalty missed); Forster (penalty scored)		(penalty missed) Raynov; (penalty scored) Eugénio; (penalty scored) Negruț; (penalty scored) Tsonev; (penalty missed) Vidanov

14 December 2017 Quarterfinal	CSKA Sofia	2–1 (a.e.t.)	Ludogorets Razgrad	Sofia
EET (UTC+2)	Bodurov 9'; Loé (yellow card) 22'; Dyulgerov (yellow card) 33'; Barthe (yellow card) 50'; Karanga (yellow card) 71'; Malinov (yellow card) 77'; Despodov 96' (yellow card) 97'; Manolev (yellow card) 98'; Culma (yellow card) 105'	Report	Wanderson (yellow card) 22'; Góralski (yellow card) 30'; Moți 34' (pen.); Natanael (red card) 109'; Vura (yellow card) 114'; Campanharo (yellow card) 119'	Stadium: Stadion Balgarska Armia; Attendance: 14,500; Referee: Georgi Kabakov

=== UEFA Champions League ===
==== Qualifying phase ====
12 July 2017 2QR 1st leg	Žalgiris (Lithuania)	2–1	(Bulgaria) Ludogorets Razgrad	Vilnius, Lithuania
21:00 EEST (UTC+3)	Blagojević (yellow card) 9'; Ljujić (yellow card) 62'; Šernas (yellow card) 64' (yellow-red card) 90+4'; Nyuiadzi 78'; Kuklys 86'; Atajić (yellow card) 90+1'	Report	Abel 18'; Campanharo (yellow card) 29'; Sasha (yellow card) 88'	Stadium: LFF stadionas Attendance: 4,911; Referee: Manuel Schüttengruber (Austria)

19 July 2017 2QR 2nd leg	Ludogorets Razgrad (Bulgaria)	4–1 (5–3 agg.)	(Lithuania) Žalgiris	Razgrad, Bulgaria
20:00 EEST (UTC+3)	Natanael 41', (yellow card) 70'; Moți (yellow card) 45'; Wanderson 55'; Keșerü 56', 74', (yellow card) 75'; Dyakov (yellow card) 76'	Report	Vaitkūnas (yellow card) 9'; Nyuiadzi 15'; Blagojević (yellow card) 56'; Slijngard (yellow card) 61'	Stadium: Ludogorets Arena; Attendance: 4,739; Referee: Mads-Kristoffer Kristoffersen (Denmark)

26 July 2017 3QR 1st leg	Hapoel Be'er Sheva (Israel)	2–0	(Bulgaria) Ludogorets Razgrad	Be'er Sheva, Israel
21:00 EEST (UTC+3)	Nwakaeme 19'; Bitton (yellow card) 67'; Ohana 79', (yellow card) 90+2'; Ogu (yellow card) 90'	Report	Moți (yellow card) 37'; Dyakov (yellow card) 90+1'	Stadium: Turner Stadium; Attendance: 15,183; Referee: Charalambos Kalogeropoulos (Greece)

2 August 2017 3QR 2nd leg	Ludogorets Razgrad (Bulgaria)	3–1 (3–3 (a) agg.)	(Israel) Hapoel Be'er Sheva	Razgrad, Bulgaria
20:30 EEST (UTC+3)	Wanderson 9', 33'; Keșerü (yellow card) 29'; Natanael (yellow card) 41'; Marcelinho 56', (red card) 90+5'; Cafú (yellow card) 61'; Plastun (yellow card) 85'	Report	Ghadir (yellow card) 35', (goal) 61'; Bitton (yellow card) 38'; Vítor (yellow card) 59'; Nwakaeme (yellow card) 65'; Ohana (yellow card) 74' (yellow-red card) 87'; Haimov (yellow card) 90+1'; Brown (yellow card) 90+4'	Stadium: Ludogorets Arena; Attendance: 5,398; Referee: Serdar Gözübüyük (Netherlands)

=== UEFA Europa League ===
==== Play-off round ====
17 August 2017 PO 1st leg	Ludogorets Razgrad (Bulgaria)	2–0	(Lithuania) Sūduva	Razgrad, Bulgaria
21:30 EEST (UTC+3)	Moți (yellow card) 41', (goal) 61'; Vura 76'; Lukoki (yellow card) 86'	Report	Činikas (yellow card) 5'; Bakr (yellow card) 41'; Vėževičius (yellow card) 42'	Stadium: Ludogorets Arena; Attendance: 5,428; Referee: Sébastien Delferière (Belgium)

24 August 2017 PO 2nd leg	Sūduva (Lithuania)	0–0 (0–2 agg.)	(Bulgaria) Ludogorets Razgrad	Marijampolė, Lithuania
21:00 EEST (UTC+3)	Laukžemis (yellow card) 11'; Kerla (yellow card) 55'; Leimonas (yellow card) 79'; Slavickas (yellow card) 86'	Report	Cicinho (yellow card) 90'; Keșerü (yellow card) 90+2'	Stadium: Sūduva Stadium; Attendance: 4,312; Referee: Halis Özkahya (Turkey)

==== Group stage ====
Pos	Team	Pld	W	D	L	GF	GA	GD	Pts	Qualification	BRA	LUD	IBS	HOF
1	(Portugal) Braga	6	3	1	2	9	8	+1	10	Advance to knockout phase	—	0–2	2–1	3–1
2	(Bulgaria) Ludogorets Razgrad	6	2	3	1	7	5	+2	9	Advance to knockout phase	1–1	—	1–2	2–1
3	(Turkey) İstanbul Başakşehir	6	2	2	2	7	8	−1	8		2–1	0–0	—	1–1
4	(Germany) TSG Hoffenheim	6	1	2	3	8	10	−2	5		1–2	1–1	3–1	—

Source: UEFA

14 September 2017 1	İstanbul Başakşehir (Turkey)	0–0	(Bulgaria) Ludogorets Razgrad	Istanbul, Turkey
20:00 EEST (UTC+3)	Elia (yellow card) 59'; Caiçara (yellow card) 79'; Erdinç (yellow card) 90+4'	Report		Stadium: Başakşehir Fatih Terim Stadyumu; Attendance: 6,804; Referee: Stefan Johannesson (Sweden)

28 September 2017 2	Ludogorets Razgrad (Bulgaria)	2–1	(Germany) 1899 Hoffenheim	Razgrad, Bulgaria
22:05 EEST (UTC+3)	Natanael (yellow card) 7'; Dyakov 46'; Lukoki 72', (yellow card) 73'	Report	Kadeřábek 2'; Kramarić (yellow card) 33'; Polanski (yellow card) 57'; Uth (yellow card) 58'; Ochs (yellow card) 62'; Geiger (yellow card) 82'	Stadium: Ludogorets Arena; Attendance: 6,155; Referee: Paweł Raczkowski (Poland)

19 October 2017 3	Braga (Portugal)	0–2	(Bulgaria) Ludogorets Razgrad	Braga, Portugal
22:05 EEST (UTC+3)	Ferreira (yellow card) 45'; Esgaio (yellow card) 49'; Paulinho (yellow card) 86'	Report	Moți 25'; Natanael (yellow card) 47'; Raul Silva 56' (o.g.)	Stadium: Estádio Municipal de Braga; Attendance: 8,623; Referee: Davide Massa (Italy)

2 November 2017 4	Ludogorets Razgrad (Bulgaria)	1–1	(Portugal) Braga	Razgrad, Bulgaria
20:00 EET (UTC+2)	Marcelinho 68'; Cicinho (yellow card) 77'	Report	Goiano (yellow card) 32'; Xadas (yellow card) 49'; Ferreira (yellow card) 80'; Fransérgio (yellow card) 82', (goal) 83'	Stadium: Ludogorets Arena; Attendance: 7,544; Referee: Vladislav Bezborodov (Russia)

23 November 2017 5	Ludogorets Razgrad (Bulgaria)	1–2	(Turkey) İstanbul Başakşehir	Razgrad, Bulgaria
22:05 EET (UTC+2)	Marcelinho (yellow card) 44', (goal) 65'; Abel (yellow card) 90+4'; Moți (yellow card) 90+4'	Report	Višća 20'; Frei 27'; Günok (yellow card) 90+4'	Stadium: Ludogorets Arena; Attendance: 7,520; Referee: Miroslav Zelinka (Czech Republic)

7 December 2017 6	1899 Hoffenheim (Germany)	1–1	(Bulgaria) Ludogorets Razgrad	Sinsheim, Germany
20:00 EET (UTC+2)	Ochs 25'; Bičakčić (yellow card) 28'; Žulj (yellow card) 66'; Nordtveit (yellow card) 78'	Report	Natanael (yellow card) 33'; Wanderson 62'; Cicinho (yellow card) 64'; Vura (yellow card) 79'; Dyakov (yellow card) 80'; Keșerü (red card) 83'	Stadium: Rhein-Neckar-Arena; Attendance: 7,814; Referee: Orel Grinfeld (Israel)

==== Knockout phase ====
15 February 2018 R32 1st leg	Ludogorets Razgrad (Bulgaria)	0–3	(Italy) Milan	Razgrad, Bulgaria
20:00 EET (UTC+2)	Lukoki (yellow card) 39'	Report	Abate (yellow card) 5'; Cutrone 45'; Rodriguez 64' (pen.); Borini 90+2'	Stadium: Ludogorets Arena; Attendance: 7,887; Referee: Milorad Mažić (Serbia)

22 February 2018 R32 2nd leg	Milan (Italy)	1–0 (4–0 agg.)	(Bulgaria) Ludogorets Razgrad	Milan, Italy
22:05 EET (UTC+2)	Borini 21'; Bonucci (yellow card) 86'	Report	Góralski (yellow card) 70'	Stadium: San Siro; Attendance: 17,453; Referee: Alberto Undiano Mallenco (Spain)

== Squad statistics ==
As of match played 20 May 2018

=== Appearances and goals ===
No.	Pos	Nat	Player	Total		A Group		Bulgarian Cup		Supercup		Europe	
No.	Pos	Nat	Player	Apps	Goals	Apps	Goals	Apps	Goals	Apps	Goals	Apps	Goals
1	GK	(Argentina) ARG	Jorge Broun	29	0	19	0	1	0	1	0	8	0
2	DF	(Brazil) BRA	Rafael Forster	9	0	6	0	2	0	0	0	1	0
4	DF	(Brazil) BRA	Cicinho	34	0	23	0	0	0	1	0	10	0
5	DF	(Bulgaria) BUL	Georgi Terziev	26	0	18+1	0	2	0	0	0	3+2	0
6	DF	(Brazil) BRA	Natanael	41	2	27	1	0	0	1	0	13	1
8	MF	(Brazil) BRA	Lucas Sasha	40	0	17+10	0	2	0	0	0	7+4	0
10	MF	(Brazil) BRA	Gustavo Campanharo	39	5	17+11	4	2	1	0	0	2+7	0
12	MF	(Madagascar) MAD	Anicet Abel	40	6	23+1	5	0+1	0	1	0	14	1
18	MF	(Bulgaria) BUL	Svetoslav Dyakov	36	1	19+4	0	0	0	1	0	9+3	1
19	MF	(Bulgaria) BUL	Aleksandar Vasilev	8	0	4+2	0	2	0	0	0	0	0
23	DF	(Bulgaria) BUL	Ventsislav Kerchev	2	0	2	0	0	0	0	0	0	0
25	MF	(Bulgaria) BUL	Tsvetomir Panov	6	0	3+3	0	0	0	0	0	0	0
28	FW	(Romania) ROU	Claudiu Keșerü	44	30	24+6	26	0+2	2	1	0	4+7	2
30	DF	(Romania) ROU	Cosmin Moți	34	4	20	2	0	0	1	0	13	2
32	DF	(Ukraine) UKR	Ihor Plastun	43	2	28+1	2	0	0	1	0	12+1	0
33	GK	(Brazil) BRA	Renan	23	0	16	0	1	0	0	0	6	0
34	MF	(Bulgaria) BUL	Oleg Dimitrov	1	0	0+1	0	0	0	0	0	0	0
38	MF	(Bulgaria) BUL	Kristiyan Kitov	1	0	1	0	0	0	0	0	0	0
44	MF	(Poland) POL	Jacek Góralski	33	0	13+11	0	2	0	0	0	6+1	0
45	MF	(Bulgaria) BUL	Ivaylo Klimentov	3	1	1+2	1	0	0	0	0	0	0
55	DF	(Bulgaria) BUL	Lachezar Kovachev	1	0	1	0	0	0	0	0	0	0
58	DF	(Bulgaria) BUL	Dimitar Iliev	1	0	0+1	0	0	0	0	0	0	0
64	MF	(Bulgaria) BUL	Dominik Yankov	3	0	2+1	0	0	0	0	0	0	0
69	GK	(Bulgaria) BUL	Damyan Damyanov	1	0	1	0	0	0	0	0	0	0
70	FW	(Poland) POL	Jakub Świerczok	14	7	4+8	7	0	0	0	0	2	0
72	MF	(Bulgaria) BUL	Erol Dost	3	1	1+2	1	0	0	0	0	0	0
75	DF	(Bulgaria) BUL	Martin Milkov	1	0	0+1	0	0	0	0	0	0	0
77	MF	(Bulgaria) BUL	Georgi Valchev	1	0	1	0	0	0	0	0	0	0
80	FW	(Bulgaria) BUL	Denislav Aleksandrov	2	1	2	1	0	0	0	0	0	0
84	MF	(Bulgaria) BUL	Marcelinho	41	12	24+3	9	0+2	0	1	0	11	3
87	DF	(Bulgaria) BUL	Preslav Petrov	1	0	1	0	0	0	0	0	0	0
88	MF	(Brazil) BRA	Wanderson	43	12	24+3	7	1	0	1	1	13+1	4
92	MF	(Democratic Republic of the Congo) COD	Jody Lukoki	39	8	18+10	7	0+1	0	0	0	7+3	1
93	FW	(Netherlands) NED	Vura	39	13	24+2	12	1	0	1	0	8+3	1
97	MF	(Bulgaria) BUL	Tomas Tsvyatkov	1	0	0+1	0	0	0	0	0	0	0
98	MF	(Bulgaria) BUL	Svetoslav Kovachev	8	0	2+3	0	2	0	0	0	0+1	0
Players away from the club on loan:
37	FW	(Brazil) BRA	João Paulo	22	1	6+8	1	2	0	0+1	0	1+4	0
Players who appeared for Ludogorets Razgrad that left during the season:
11	FW	(Brazil) BRA	Juninho Quixadá	12	4	4+5	3	2	1	0+1	0	0	0
22	FW	(Brazil) BRA	Jonathan Cafu	5	0	0+1	0	0	0	0	0	4	0

=== Goal scorers ===
Place	Position	Nation	Number	Name	A Group	Bulgarian Cup	Supercup	Europe	Total
1	FW	(Romania)	28	Claudiu Keșerü	26	2	0	2	30
2	FW	(Netherlands)	93	Vura	12	0	0	1	13
3	MF	(Bulgaria)	84	Marcelinho	9	0	0	3	12
3	MF	(Brazil)	88	Wanderson	7	0	1	4	12
5	MF	(Democratic Republic of the Congo)	92	Jody Lukoki	7	0	0	1	8
6	FW	(Poland)	70	Jakub Świerczok	7	0	0	0	7
7	MF	(Madagascar)	12	Anicet Abel	5	0	0	1	6
8	MF	(Brazil)	10	Gustavo Campanharo	4	1	0	0	5
9	MF	(Brazil)	11	Juninho Quixadá	3	1	0	0	4
9	DF	(Romania)	30	Cosmin Moți	2	0	0	2	4
13				Own goal	2	0	0	1	3
12	DF	(Ukraine)	32	Ihor Plastun	2	0	0	0	2
12	DF	(Brazil)	6	Natanael	1	0	0	1	2
14	FW	(Brazil)	37	João Paulo	1	0	0	0	1
14	FW	(Bulgaria)	80	Denislav Aleksandrov	1	0	0	0	1
14	MF	(Bulgaria)	45	Ivaylo Klimentov	1	0	0	0	1
14	MF	(Bulgaria)	72	Erol Dost	1	0	0	0	1
14	MF	(Bulgaria)	18	Svetoslav Dyakov	0	0	0	1	1
TOTALS					89	4	1	17	111

=== Disciplinary record ===
Number	Nation	Position	Name	A Group		Bulgarian Cup		Supercup		Europe		Total	
Number	Nation	Position	Name	Yellow card	Red card	Yellow card	Red card	Yellow card	Red card	Yellow card	Red card	Yellow card	Red card
1	(Argentina)	GK	Jorge Broun	1	0	0	0	0	0	0	0	1	0
2	(Brazil)	DF	Rafael Forster	3	0	0	0	0	0	0	0	3	0
4	(Brazil)	DF	Cicinho	8	1	0	0	0	0	3	0	11	1
5	(Bulgaria)	DF	Georgi Terziev	2	0	0	0	0	0	0	0	2	0
6	(Brazil)	DF	Natanael	7	0	0	0	1	0	5	0	13	0
8	(Brazil)	MF	Lucas Sasha	1	0	0	0	0	0	1	0	2	0
10	(Brazil)	MF	Gustavo Campanharo	3	0	1	0	0	0	1	0	5	0
12	(Madagascar)	MF	Anicet Abel	3	0	0	0	0	0	1	0	4	0
18	(Bulgaria)	MF	Svetoslav Dyakov	10	1	0	0	1	0	3	0	14	1
19	(Bulgaria)	MF	Aleksandar Vasilev	1	0	0	0	0	0	0	0	1	0
28	(Romania)	FW	Claudiu Keșerü	3	0	0	0	1	0	3	1	7	1
30	(Romania)	DF	Cosmin Moți	6	0	0	0	0	0	4	0	10	0
32	(Ukraine)	DF	Ihor Plastun	0	0	0	0	0	0	1	0	1	0
37	(Brazil)	FW	João Paulo	1	0	0	0	0	0	0	0	1	0
44	(Poland)	MF	Jacek Góralski	5	0	2	1	0	0	1	0	8	1
64	(Bulgaria)	MF	Dominik Yankov	1	0	0	0	0	0	0	0	1	0
70	(Poland)	FW	Jakub Świerczok	3	0	0	0	0	0	0	0	3	0
72	(Bulgaria)	MF	Erol Dost	1	0	0	0	0	0	0	0	1	0
84	(Bulgaria)	MF	Marcelinho	3	0	0	0	0	0	2	0	5	0
88	(Brazil)	MF	Wanderson	1	0	0	0	0	0	0	0	1	0
92	(Democratic Republic of the Congo)	MF	Jody Lukoki	6	0	0	0	0	0	3	0	9	0
93	(Netherlands)	FW	Vura	6	0	1	0	0	0	1	0	8	0
Players away on loan:
37	(Brazil)	FW	João Paulo	1	0	0	0	0	0	0	0	1	0
Players who left Ludogorets Razgrad during the season:
11	(Brazil)	FW	Juninho Quixadá	2	0	0	0	0	0	0	0	2	0
22	(Brazil)	FW	Jonathan Cafu	0	0	0	0	0	0	1	0	1	0
			TOTALS	78	2	4	1	3	0	29	2	114	5
