= Dragoș Grigore =

Romanian footballer (born 1986)

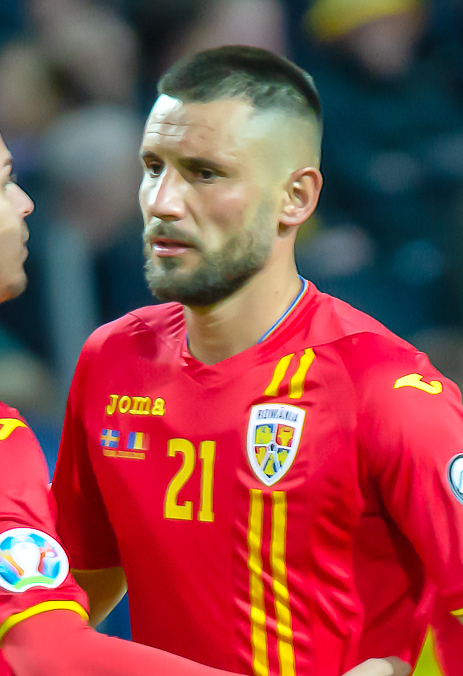
- Grigore with Romania in 2019

Personal information
- Date of birth: 7 September 1986 (age 40)
- Place of birth: Vaslui, Romania
- Height: 1.85 m (6 ft 1 in)
- Position: Centre-back

Team information
- Current team: CSM Vaslui
- Number: 13

Youth career
- 2002–2005: LPS Vaslui

Senior career*
Years	Team	Apps	(Gls)
2005–2006	FCM Huși		
2006–2008	CFR Timișoara	42	(2)
2008–2010	Dinamo București II	27	(0)
2008–2014	Dinamo București	126	(9)
2014–2016	Toulouse	27	(0)
2015–2016	→ Al-Sailiya (loan)	21	(1)
2016–2018	Al-Sailiya	44	(4)
2018–2021	Ludogorets Razgrad	39	(5)
2021–2024	Rapid București	61	(3)
2024	Gloria Buzău	2	(0)
2025–	CSM Vaslui		

International career
2011–2020	Romania	38	(1)
- * Club domestic league appearances and goals as of 6 March 2026

Dragoș Grigore (Romanian pronunciation: [ˈdraɡoʃ ɡriˈɡore]; born 7 September 1986) is a Romanian professional footballer who plays as a centre-back for Liga III club CSM Vaslui, which he captains.

== Club career ==
=== Early career ===
Grigore was born on 7 September 1986 in Vaslui, Romania and grew up admiring footballer David Beckham. He began playing junior-level football at local club LPS Vaslui. He started his senior career by playing for FCM Huși during the 2005–06 Divizia C season. His talent was noticed by coach Ioan Sdrobiș, who brought him to second-tier club CFR Timișoara in 2006.

=== Dinamo București ===
In 2008, Grigore joined Dinamo București, where coach Mircea Rednic gave him his Liga I debut on 22 November by sending him in the 76th minute to replace Silviu Izvoranu in a 2–0 away loss to FC Brașov. He helped the club achieve what was dubbed "The wonder from Liberec" by winning the away game 3–0 against Slovan Liberec to force a penalty shoot-out after losing the first leg by the same score, ultimately qualifying for the 2009–10 Europa League group stage. In March 2009, during a 2–2 draw against CFR Cluj, he was injured following a duel with Yssouf Koné, which kept him off the pitch for six months. On 16 April 2011, Grigore scored his first Liga I goal by closing the scoring with a header in the final minutes of a 3–3 draw against Oțelul Galați.

Dinamo reached the 2011 Cupa României final, where Grigore played the entire match under coach Ioan Andone in the 2–1 loss to rivals Steaua București. Afterwards, the club won the 2011–12 Cupa României, in which coach Dario Bonetti used Grigore the full 90 minutes in the 1–0 victory in the final against Rapid București. He then helped the team win the 2012 Supercupa României, playing the whole game under Bonetti in the penalty shoot-out victory against CFR Cluj, where Grigore netted the decisive last spot kick. During the 2013–14 season, he scored a career-best six league goals, which included a brace in a 6–0 win over Universitatea Cluj and one goal in a 1–1 derby draw against Steaua.

=== Toulouse ===
In June 2014, Grigore was transferred from Dinamo to Toulouse for a €1 million fee. There, he became a teammate of compatriot Mihai Roman and was seen as a replacement for Jonathan Zebina. Grigore made his Ligue 1 debut on 9 August 2014 under coach Alain Casanova in a 3–2 away loss to Nice. He wore the captain's armband in a 6–1 loss to Marseille in which he was heavily criticized by the press for his performance. Grigore made 27 league appearances as the team finished in 17th place and he was included by the newspaper L'Équipe in a first XI of the season's worst-performing players.

=== Al-Sailiya ===
In the summer of 2015, Grigore was loaned by Toulouse to Al-Sailiya. He made his Qatar Stars League debut on 11 September 2015 under coach Sami Trabelsi in a 4–0 away loss to Al-Rayyan, receiving a red card in the 63rd minute. Grigore scored his first league goal on 18 March 2016 in a 1–1 draw against Qatar SC. In January 2016, Al-Sailiya transferred him permanently from Toulouse. One year later, he became a teammate of his fellow Romanian Valentin Lazăr, who was transferred by the club.

=== Ludogorets Razgrad ===
Grigore joined Ludogorets Razgrad in June 2018. There, he became teammates with compatriots Cosmin Moți, Claudiu Keșerü and Adrian Popa. Grigore made his Bulgarian league debut on 23 February 2019 under coach Antoni Zdravkov in a 1–0 away loss to Cherno More Varna. He scored his first goal in the competition in a 6–0 victory against Septemvri Sofia, a game in which he also provided an assist for Jakub Świerczok's goal. He netted four goals in 12 matches until the end of the 2018–19 season, as the team won the title. Grigore started the following season by playing the entire match under coach Stoycho Stoev in the 2−0 win over Lokomotiv Plovdiv in the 2019 Bulgarian Supercup. Afterwards, he helped Ludogorets reach the round of 32, where they were defeated 4−1 on aggregate by Inter Milan. He made 17 league appearances and finished the season by winning another title. Subsequently, Grigore was used for the full 90 minutes by coach Pavel Vrba in the 1–0 loss to Lokomotiv Plovdiv in the 2020 Bulgarian Supercup. He made 10 league appearances with one goal scored during the 2020–21 season and won his third consecutive title with the team.

=== Rapid București ===
In the summer of 2021, Grigore joined Rapid București. He scored his first goal for his new team on 23 July with a header in a 2–0 win over Mioveni. In May 2024, after a three-season spell, Grigore left Rapid.

=== Gloria Buzău and CSM Vaslui ===
In June 2024, Grigore went to play for Gloria Buzău. However, in less than three months, he and the club parted ways by mutual agreement. He has a total of 189 matches and eight goals in Liga I. In January 2025, he signed with his hometown club CSM Vaslui in the third league.

== International career ==
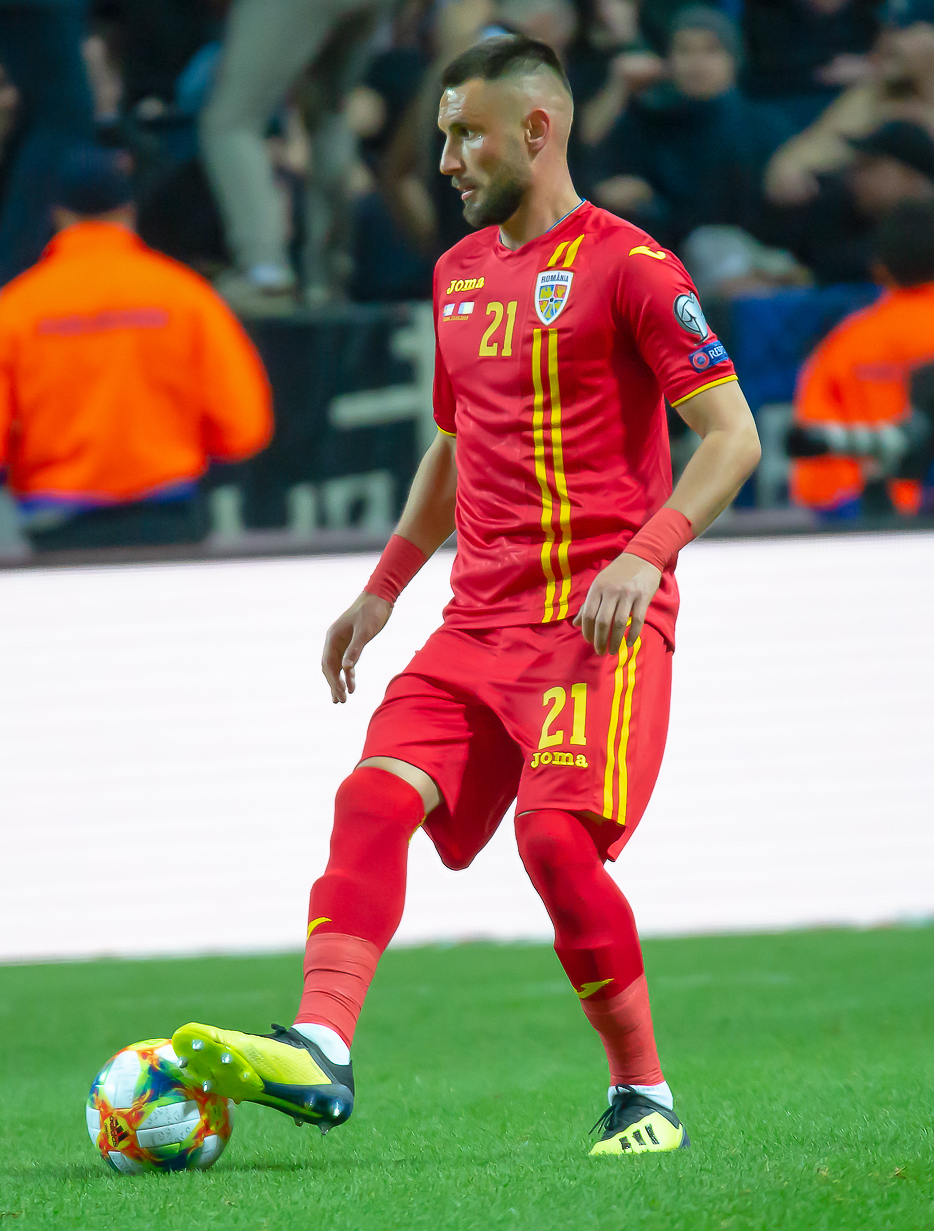
Grigore in action for Romania during a 2019 match

Grigore played 38 matches and scored one goal for Romania, making his debut on 9 February 2011 under coach Răzvan Lucescu in a 2–2 (5–4, after penalty kicks) win against Cyprus in the friendly Cyprus International Football Tournament. He formed a strong partnership in the central defence with Vlad Chiricheș during the successful Euro 2016 qualifiers, with both playing in all 10 games in which The Tricoulours conceded only two goals. Grigore was selected by coach Anghel Iordănescu to be part of Romania's squad for the final tournament. There, he played for the entirety of all three games which were a draw against Switzerland and losses to France and Albania, as his side failed to progress from their group. In the following years, he made six appearances in the 2018 World Cup qualifiers and four during the Euro 2020 qualifiers. Grigore made his last appearance for the national team on 7 September 2020, scoring a goal in a 3–2 away win over Austria in the 2020–21 Nations League B.

== Style of play ==
Ioan Sdrobiș described Grigore's style of play as follows: "He has exceptional technique for a defender. He handles the ball with ease; he's in the mold of Belodedici and Ștefănescu."

== Personal life ==
Grigore is known for his charity work in Romania.

== Career statistics ==
=== Club ===
Appearances and goals by club, season and competition
Club	Season	League			National cup (Note: Includes Cupa României, Coupe de France, Bulgarian Cup)		Europe		Other		Total	
Club	Season	Division	Apps	Goals	Apps	Goals	Apps	Goals	Apps	Goals	Apps	Goals
FCM Huși	2005–06	Divizia C					—		—			
CFR Timișoara	2006–07	Liga II	27	2			—		—		27	2
CFR Timișoara	2007–08	Liga II	15	0			—		—		15	0
CFR Timișoara	Total		42	2			—		—		42	2
Dinamo II București	2008–09	Liga II	18	0	0	0	—		—		18	0
Dinamo II București	2009–10	Liga II	4	0	—		—		—		4	0
Dinamo II București	2010–11	Liga II	5	0	—		—		—		5	0
Dinamo II București	Total		27	0	0	0	—		—		27	0
Dinamo București	2008–09	Liga I	2	0	0	0	—		—		2	0
Dinamo București	2009–10	Liga I	12	0	1	0	2 (Note: Appearance(s) in UEFA Europa League)	0	—		15	0
Dinamo București	2010–11	Liga I	20	1	4	0	0	0	—		24	1
Dinamo București	2011–12	Liga I	29	1	6	0	1	0	—		36	1
Dinamo București	2012–13	Liga I	32	1	3	0	2	0	1 (Note: Appearance in Supercupa României)	0	38	1
Dinamo București	2013–14	Liga I	31	6	4	1	—		—		35	7
Dinamo București	Total		126	9	18	1	5	0	1	0	150	10
Toulouse	2014–15	Ligue 1	27	0	1	0	—		1 (Note: Appearance in Coupe de la Ligue)	0	29	0
Al-Sailiya (loan)	2015–16	Qatar Stars League	21	1	0	0	—		—		21	1
Al-Sailiya	2016–17	Qatar Stars League	25	2	0	0	—		—		25	2
Al-Sailiya	2017–18	Qatar Stars League	19	2	0	0	—		—		19	2
Al-Sailiya	Total		65	5	0	0	—		—		65	5
Ludogorets Razgrad	2018–19	Bulgarian First League	12	4	1	0	0	0	0	0	13	4
Ludogorets Razgrad	2019–20	Bulgarian First League	17	0	2	0	8	0	1 (Note: Appearance in Bulgarian Supercup)	0	28	0
Ludogorets Razgrad	2020–21	Bulgarian First League	10	1	3	0	4 (Note: Two appearances in UEFA Champions League, two appearances in UEFA Europa League)	0	1	0	18	1
Ludogorets Razgrad	Total		39	5	6	0	12	0	2	0	59	5
Rapid București	2021–22	Liga I	30	1	1	0	—		—		31	1
Rapid București	2022–23	Liga I	28	2	3	0	—		—		31	2
Rapid București	2023–24	Liga I	3	0	1	0	—		—		4	0
Rapid București	Total		61	3	5	0	—		—		66	3
Gloria Buzău	2024–25	Liga I	2	0	1	0	—		—		3	0
CSM Vaslui	2024–25	Liga III			—		—		—			
CSM Vaslui	2025–26	Liga III			1	0	—		—		1	0
CSM Vaslui	Total				1	0	—		—		1	0
Career total			389	24	32	1	17	0	4	0	442	25

=== International ===
Appearances and goals by national team and year
National team	Year	Apps	Goals
Romania
Romania	2011	1	0
Romania	2012	1	0
Romania	2013	1	0
Romania	2014	7	0
Romania	2015	7	0
Romania	2016	11	0
Romania	2017	3	0
Romania	2018	2	0
Romania	2019	4	0
Romania	2020	1	1
Total		38	1

Scores and results list Romania's goal tally first, score column indicates score after each Grigore goal.

List of international goals scored by Dragoș Grigore
No.	Date	Venue	Cap	Opponent	Score	Result	Competition
1	7 September 2020	Wörthersee Stadion, Klagenfurt, Austria	38	Austria	2–1	3–2	2020–21 UEFA Nations League B

== Honours ==
Dinamo București

- Cupa României: 2011–12, runner-up 2010–11
- Supercupa României: 2012

Ludogorets Razgrad

- Bulgarian First League: 2018–19, 2019–20, 2020–21
- Bulgarian Supercup: 2019, runner-up 2020
