= Natanael (footballer, born 1990) =

Brazilian footballer

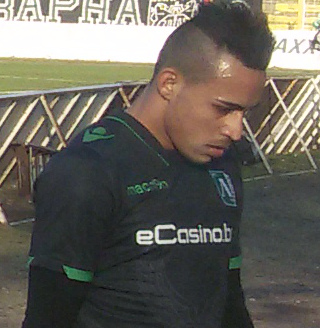

Personal information
- Full name: Natanael Batista Pimenta
- Date of birth: 25 December 1990 (age 35)
- Place of birth: Cuiabá, Brazil
- Height: 1.66 m (5 ft 5 1/2 in)
- Position: Left back

Team information
- Current team: Avaí
- Number: 25

Youth career
- Búfalo EF

Senior career*
Years	Team	Apps	(Gls)
2009–2010	Operário-MT	6	(1)
2010	→ Serra-MT (loan)	2	(0)
2011–2013	Cuiabá	95	(3)
2013–2015	Atlético Paranaense	55	(1)
2015–2019	Ludogorets II	4	(0)
2015–2019	Ludogorets Razgrad	96	(3)
2019–2022	Internacional	9	(0)
2020–2021	→ Atlético Goianiense	45	(2)
2022–	Avaí	47	(2)
- * Club domestic league appearances and goals as of 23:03, 13 January 2024 (UTC)

Natanael Batista Pimenta (born 25 December 1990), simply known as Natanael, is a Brazilian footballer who plays as a left back for Internacional.

== Club career ==
=== Early career ===
Born in Cuiabá, Mato Grosso, Natanael made his senior debuts with Operário de Várzea Grande in 2009. In 2011, he joined hometown's Cuiabá, after a short stint at Associação Atlética Serra de Tangará.

=== Atlético Paranaense ===
On 19 December 2013, after his contract with Cuiabá expired, Natanael signed a one-year deal with Série A club Atlético Paranaense. He made his debut in the competition on 20 April, starting in a 1–0 home win against Grêmio. On 3 July 2014, Natanael signed a new three-year deal with Furacão. He finished the campaign with 31 appearances (all starts), also appearing regularly during the year's Copa Libertadores.

On 22 March 2015, Natanael scored his first goal for Atlético Paranaense in a 7–0 home win over Nacional in the Campeonato Paranaense.

=== Ludogorets Razgrad ===
In July 2015, Natanael signed for Bulgarian champions PFC Ludogorets Razgrad for an undisclosed fee. On 8 August, he played 55 minutes for Ludogorets II in a B Group match against Vereya. Natanael made his first-team debut on 16 August, playing the full 90 minutes as Ludogorets beat Lokomotiv Plovdiv 1–0 at Ludogorets Arena. The Brazilian quickly established himself as a first choice in the main squad, helping Ludogorets to win their fifth championship in the 2015–16 season. Natanael then played in all 6 qualifying matches of the 2016–17 UEFA Champions League, with his team managing to enter the group stage of the tournament. On 28 September 2016, he opened the scoring in the home match against Paris Saint-Germain in the group stage, netting from a free kick, but the Razgrad team went on to concede three goals and lost the match.

== Statistics ==
As of 13 October 2021

Club	Season	League			State League		Cup		Continental		Other		Total	
Club	Season	Division	Apps	Goals	Apps	Goals	Apps	Goals	Apps	Goals	Apps	Goals	Apps	Goals
Operário-MT	2010	Mato-Grossense	—		6	1	—		—		—		6	1
Serra-MT (loan)	2010	Mato-Grossense 2ª Divisão	—		2	0	—		—		—		2	0
Cuiabá	2011	Série D	14	1	12	1	1	0	—		—		27	2
Cuiabá	2012	Série C	13	0	21	0	2	0	—		—		36	0
Cuiabá	2013	Série C	19	0	16	1	0	0	—		—		35	1
Cuiabá	Total		46	1	49	2	3	0	—		—		98	3
Atlético Paranaense	2014	Série A	31	0	0	0	2	0	8 (Note: Appearance(s) in Copa Libertadores)	0	—		41	0
Atlético Paranaense	2015	Série A	13	0	11	1	4	0	0	0	—		28	1
Atlético Paranaense	Total		44	0	11	1	6	0	8	0	—		69	1
Ludogorets Razgrad II	2015–16	B Group	1	0	—		—		—		—		1	0
Ludogorets Razgrad	2015–16	A Group	27	0	—		0	0	0	0	1 (Note: Appearance(s) in Bulgarian Supercup)	0	28	0
Ludogorets Razgrad	2016–17	First League	26	1	—		3	1	14 (Note: Twelve appearances and one goal in UEFA Champions League, two appearances in UEFA Europa League)	1	0	0	43	3
Ludogorets Razgrad	2017–18	First League	27	1	—		0	0	13 (Note: Four appearances and one goal in UEFA Champions League, nine appearances in UEFA Europa League)	1	1	0	41	2
Ludogorets Razgrad	2018–19	First League	16	1	—		2	0	13 (Note: Four appearances in UEFA Champions League, nine appearances in UEFA Europa League)	0	1	0	32	1
Ludogorets Razgrad	Total		96	3	—		5	1	40	2	3	0	144	6
Internacional	2019	Série A	7	0	—		0	0	0	0	—		7	0
Internacional	2020	Série A	0	0	2	0	0	0	0	0	—		2	0
Internacional	Total		7	0	2	0	0	0	0	0	—		9	0
Atlético Goianiense (loan)	2020	Série A	19	2	3	0	2	0	—		—		24	2
Atlético Goianiense (loan)	2021	Série A	19	0	4	0	5	0	4 (Note: Appearance(s) in Copa Sudamericana)	0	—		32	0
Atlético Goianiense (loan)	Total		38	2	7	0	7	0	4	0	—		56	2
Career total			232	6	77	4	21	1	52	2	3	0	385	13

== Honours ==
Ludogorets Razgrad

- Bulgarian First League (4): 2015–16, 2016–17, 2017–18, 2018–19
- Bulgarian Supercup: 2018

Avaí

- Campeonato Catarinense: 2025
