= Fabio Dixon =

Swiss footballer (born 1999)

Personal information
- Birth name: Fabio Nicolas Dixon
- Date of birth: 21 June 1999 (age 27)
- Place of birth: Zürich, Switzerland
- Height: 1.83 m (6 ft 0 in)
- Position: Right-back

Youth career
- Zürich

Senior career*
Years	Team	Apps	(Gls)
2018–2019	Zürich	3	(0)
2019–2021	Chiasso	47	(1)
2021–2022	Bellinzona	11	(0)
2022	Dalkurd	25	(1)
2023–2024	Bellinzona	26	(0)
2024	Rapperswil-Jona	9	(0)

International career^{‡}
2016	Switzerland U18	1	(0)
2017–2018	Switzerland U19	3	(0)
- * Club domestic league appearances and goals as of 1 June 2025 ‡ National team caps and goals as of 31 December 2018

Fabio Nicolas Dixon (born 21 June 1999) is a Swiss footballer who plays as a right-back.

== International career ==
Born in Switzerland, Dixon is of Jamaican descent. He is a youth international for Switzerland.
