= Huvepharma Arena =

Stadium in Razgrad, Bulgaria

Coordinates: 43°32′4.4″N 26°31′39.8″E

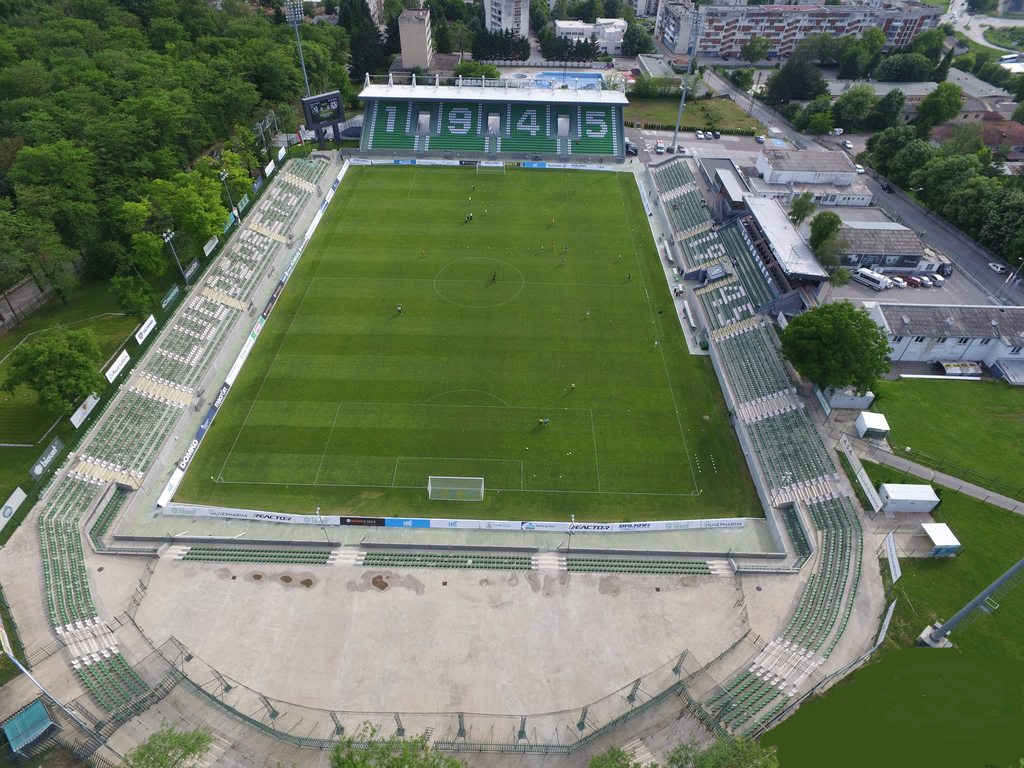
- Aerial view in 2015.
- Interactive map of Huvepharma Arena
- Former names: Dyanko Stefanov Stadium (1954–2011); Ludogorets Arena (2011–2019)
- Location: Razgrad, Bulgaria
- Owner: Razgrad Municipality
- Operator: Ludogorets Razgrad
- Capacity: 10,423 (current)
- Surface: Grass
- Scoreboard: LED

Construction
- Built: 1954
- Renovated: 2011
- Expanded: 2015, 2017, 2018
- Architects: Ardist OOD, RB Green OOD

Tenants
- Ludogorets Razgrad (2011–); Ludogorets Razgrad II (2015–2017); Dunav Ruse (2016–2017); Bulgaria national football team (2018–); Bulgaria national under-21 football team (2015–)

Website
- www.ludogorets.com/bg/stadium/

Huvepharma Arena (Bulgarian: Хювефарма Арена) is a football stadium in Razgrad, Bulgaria. It is the home ground of the local football club Ludogorets Razgrad. The stadium has a seating capacity of 10,423 spectators.

== History ==
The stadium was officially opened on 25 September 2011, with Bulgarian Prime Minister Boyko Borisov and Bulgarian Football Union president Borislav Mihaylov present at the ceremony.

Starting from August 2014, Ludogorets began a project to reconstruct the stadium and expand its capacity to 12,500, in order to accommodate European tournament matches.

The first stand to be reconstructed was officially unveiled on 15 May 2015, as Ludogorets clinched their fourth consecutive Bulgarian First League title in a 4–1 win against Lokomotiv Sofia. The sector carries a capacity of 2,038 people and was named after Romanian defender Cosmin Moți in recognition of his performance during the 2014–15 UEFA Champions League play-off round second leg against Steaua București, when he replaced the sent-off goalkeeper Vladislav Stoyanov to save two penalty kicks and score one himself, qualifying his team to the group stage for the first time in the club's history.

On 12 August 2017, the club inaugurated the newly modernized east stand before a league match against Vereya Stara Zagora. The stand, which was built in just five months, added 3,500 seats to the stadium's capacity, bringing the total number up to 9,000 seats. This allowed Ludogorets Arena to host Champions League and Europa League group stage matches for the first time ever, starting from the 2017–18 season onwards. Club officials later announced that they will build a copy of the 'Moți' stand on the north end next, before proceeding with construction of the main one.

On 28 September 2017, the stadium hosted its first ever European competition group stage game, as Ludogorets defeated 1899 Hoffenheim 2–1 in a Group C Europa League fixture, with 6,155 fans in attendance.

On 11 July 2018, Ludogorets officially opened the newly renovated north stand before their Champions League first-round game against Crusaders FC. The sector added a further 2,208 seats to the stadium's capacity, raising it to 10,442.

On 18 December 2019, it was announced that the stadium's name had been changed to Huvepharma Arena.

== Other tenants ==
Ludogorets Arena has hosted a number of other teams since its reopening in 2011. Between 2015 and 2017 it was home to Ludogorets' reserve team, Ludogorets Razgrad II, before they moved to the newly built 2,000-capacity Eagles' Nest located at the club's training centre, the Sport Center Ludogorets.

Following the promotion of Dunav Ruse to the First League in 2016, their Gradski Stadium had to be renovated to meet the licensing criteria of the Bulgarian Football Union. Starting from July 2016, Dunav played their home games at the Ludogorets Arena, until they returned to Ruse on 28 April 2017.

=== National teams ===
On 8 September 2015, Ludogorets Arena hosted the Bulgaria national under-21 football team for the first time ever, as they defeated Luxembourg 3–0 in a Group 5 qualifier for the 2017 UEFA European Under-21 Championship in front of a crowd of 2,200. As of March 2018 this remains the only under-21 game played in Razgrad.

The stadium was host to the Bulgaria national football team for the first time on 23 March 2018, in a 1–0 friendly game loss against Bosnia and Herzegovina in front of 2,200 spectators.

From 2 June to 23 September 2022, the stadium hosted all three home games in Bulgaria's campaign in 2022–23 UEFA Nations League C.

=== International matches ===
==== Bulgaria national football team ====
Senior teams only.

Date	Result	Opponent	Competition	Attendance
23 March 2018	0–1	Bosnia and Herzegovina	Friendly	2,200
2 June 2022	1–1	North Macedonia	UEFA Nations League	8,275
5 June 2022	2–5	Georgia	UEFA Nations League	3,600
23 September 2022	5–1	Gibraltar	UEFA Nations League	1,540
24 March 2023	0–1	Montenegro	UEFA Euro 2024 qualifying	9,180
20 June 2023	1–1	Serbia	UEFA Euro 2024 qualifying	6,700

== Attendance figures ==
As of 2 August 2022

Season	League att.	Games	Average	Change	Cup att.	Games	European att.	Games	Total attendance	Total games	Average	Notes
2011–12	56,370	15	3,758	–	5,000	1	–	–	61,370	16	3,836	First season in top division
2012–13	41,560	15	2,771	–26.3%	3,000	1	4,000	1	48,560	17	2,856	First season in European competitions
2013–14	58,800	19	3,095	+11.7%	8,190	4	10,890	2	77,880	25	3,115	
2014–15	54,780	16	3,424	+10.6%	11,520	3	10,104	2	76,404	21	3,638	
2015–16	49,390	17	2,905	–15.2%	0	0	5,120	1	54,510	18	3,028	Moti stand opens, capacity increased to 7,700
2016–17	36,980	18	2,054	–29.3%	630	1	13,759	2	51,369	21	2,446	
2017–18	34,490	18	1,916	–6.7%	480	1	44,671	7	79,641	26	3,063	East stand opens, capacity increased to 9,000; first group stage European games
2018–19	40,430	18	2,246	+17.2%	7,100	2	33,748	7	82,013	27	3,038	North stand opens, capacity increased to 10,422
2019–20	27,180	15	1,812	–19.3%	0	0	56,114	8	83,294	23	3,621	
2020–21	6,500	16	406	–	0	3	0	4	6,500	23	283	Only 2 home league games had any audience allowed due to COVID-19 restrictions.
2021–22	12,280	13	945	–	5,150	2	25,932	7	43,362	22	1,971	Partial COVID-19 restrictions in place for some games in the early-to-mid season.
2022–23	29,420	18	1,634	–	5,650	3	49,940	8	85,010	29	2,931	
2023–24	29,626	18	1,743	–	798	3	55,836	8	86,260	29	3,195	
2024–25	32,977	18	1,832	–	3,007	2	44,127	8	80,111	28	2,861	
2025–26	10,123	9	1,125	–	0	0	39,490	7	49,613	16	3,101	
Total (2011–26)	520,906	243	2,144	–	50,525	23	393,731	68	965,162	334	2,907	

Notes:
- Green shading indicates record highs; red shading indicates record lows. 2020–21 and 2021–22 are not counted due to COVID-19 restrictions.
- Source: Bulgarian-football.com archive, Soccerway.com archive

== Gallery ==
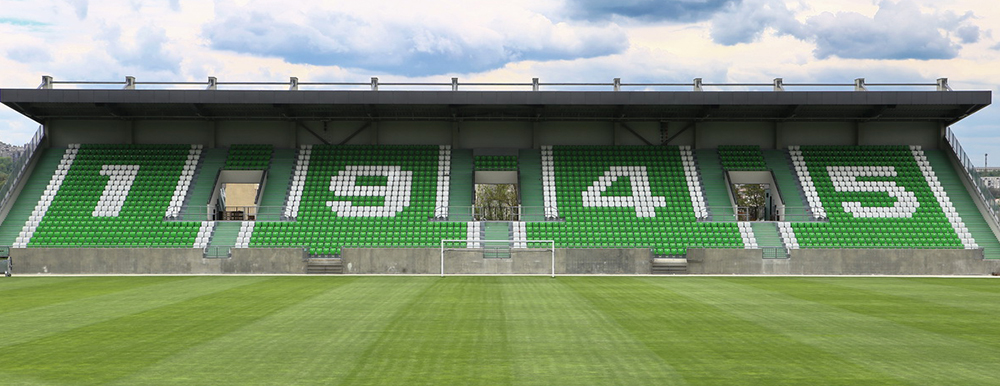
The 2,038-capacity 'Moți' stand was opened in May 2015.

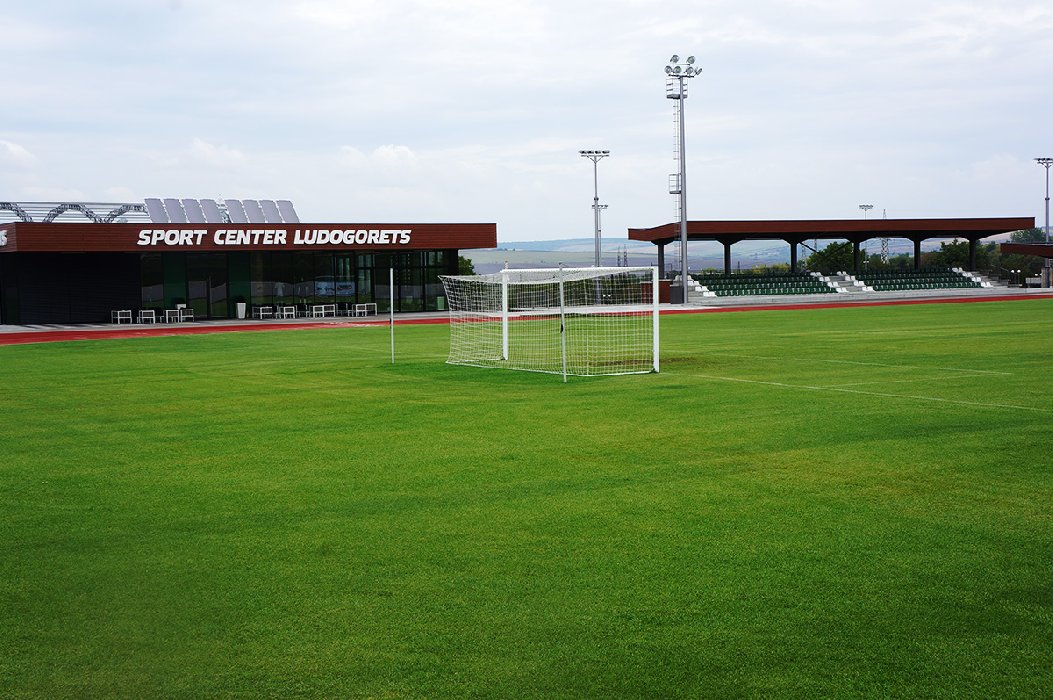
Ludogorets Razgrad II moved to the Eagles' Nest before the start of the 2017–18 Second League season.
