= Erol Dost =

Bulgarian footballer

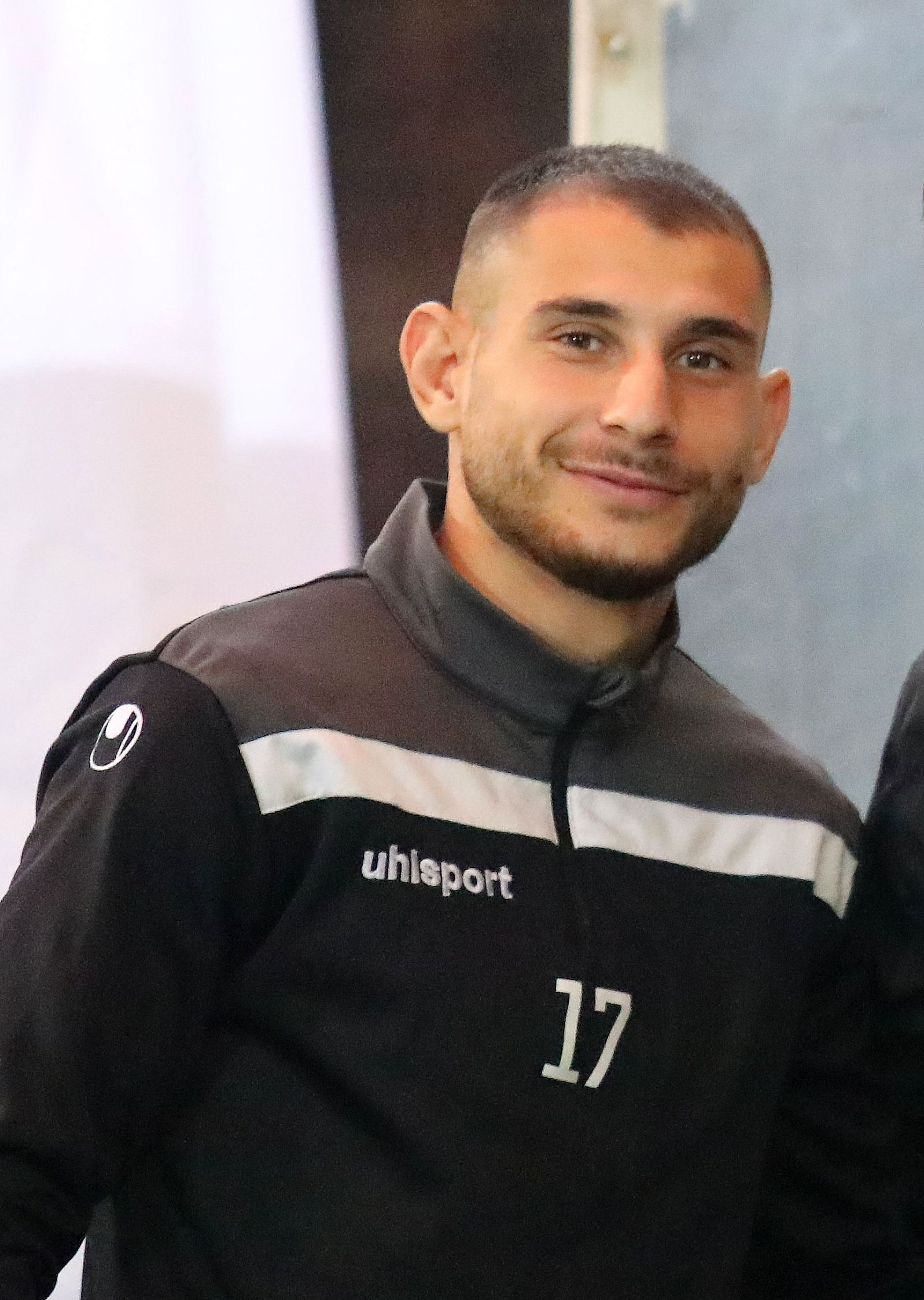

Personal information
- Full name: Erol Erol Dost
- Date of birth: 30 May 1999 (age 27)
- Place of birth: Pazardzhik, Bulgaria
- Height: 1.74 m (5 ft 9 in)
- Position: Midfielder

Team information
- Current team: Lokomotiv Sofia
- Number: 5

Youth career
- –2015: Lokomotiv Plovdiv
- 2015–2018: Ludogorets

Senior career*
Years	Team	Apps	(Gls)
2017–2020	Ludogorets II	71	(4)
2017–2020	Ludogorets Razgrad	3	(1)
2019–2020	→ Etar (loan)	5	(0)
2021–2024	Slavia Sofia	101	(4)
2024–2025	Krumovgrad	31	(1)
2025–	Lokomotiv Sofia	33	(4)

International career^{‡}
2016–2017	Bulgaria U18	6	(0)
2017–2018	Bulgaria U19	2	(0)
- * Club domestic league appearances and goals as of 11 June 2026 ‡ National team caps and goals as of 17 March 2018

Erol Dost (Bulgarian: Ерол Дост; born 30 May 1999) is a Bulgarian professional footballer who plays as a midfielder for First League club Lokomotiv Sofia.

== Career ==
=== Ludogorets Razgrad ===
Dost begin his career in Lokomotiv Plovdiv before moving to Ludogorets Razgrad Academy in 2015. Dost played in 5 of the matches in UEFA Youth League group stage for the U19 team in 2016.

On 27 May 2017 he made his debut for Ludogorets II in a match against Spartak Pleven. He was promoted to the first team in the summer of 2017 and joined the first team camp. Dost completed his debut for the first team on 5 August 2017 in a match against Vitosha Bistritsa, coming on as a substitute in the added time of the second half. He scored his first goal for Ludogorets on 20 May 2018 in the last league match for the season against Botev Plovdiv.

=== Slavia Sofia ===
In the end of December 2020 Dost terminated his contract with Ludogorets Razgrad by mutual agreement to sign a week later with Slavia Sofia.

== Career statistics ==
=== Club ===
As of 19 June 2019

Club performance			League		Cup		Continental		Other		Total	
Club	League	Season	Apps	Goals	Apps	Goals	Apps	Goals	Apps	Goals	Apps	Goals
Bulgaria			League		Bulgarian Cup		Europe		Other (Note: Includes Bulgarian Supercup matches.)		Total	
Ludogorets Razgrad II	Second League	2016–17	1	0	–		–		–		1	0
Ludogorets Razgrad II	Second League	2017–18	22	1	–		–		–		22	1
Ludogorets Razgrad II	Second League	2018–19	27	2	–		–		–		27	2
Ludogorets Razgrad II	Total		50	3	0	0	0	0	0	0	50	3
Ludogorets Razgrad	First League	2017–18	3	1	0	0	0	0	0	0	3	1
Ludogorets Razgrad	Total		3	1	0	0	0	0	0	0	3	1
Career statistics			53	4	0	0	0	0	0	0	53	4
