= 2020 Bulgarian Cup final =

Финал за Купата на България 2020
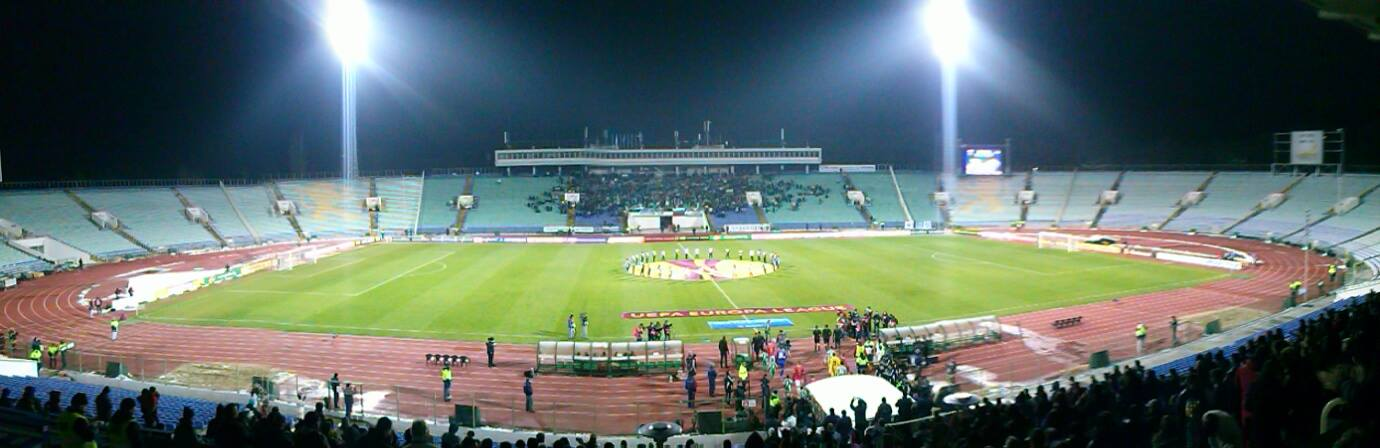
- Event: 2019–20 Bulgarian Cup
CSKA Sofia	Lokomotiv Plovdiv
0	0
- Lokomotiv Plovdiv won 5–3 on penalties
- Date: 1 July 2020
- Venue: Vasil Levski, Sofia
- Referee: Georgi Kabakov (Plovdiv)
- Attendance: 12,000
- Weather: Clear; 30 °C (86 °F)

The 2020 Bulgarian Cup final was the final match of the 2019–20 Bulgarian Cup and the 80th final of the Bulgarian Cup. The final took place on 1 July 2020 at Vasil Levski National Stadium, Sofia, Bulgaria. On 27 June the Bulgarian Football Union announced that it is allowed for the stadium to host up to 30% of its total capacity (i.e. 12,000 spectators) with up to 3,000 spectators per block in accordance with the health regulations issued by the Ministry of Health in relation to the ongoing COVID-19 pandemic in Bulgaria.

The clubs contesting the final were CSKA Sofia and Lokomotiv Plovdiv. Both teams had met on multiple occasions in the competition but never in the final itself. This was CSKA's 33rd final and the first one since 2016, while Lokomotiv Plovdiv appeared in their 2nd consecutive and 6th overall final.

Lokomotiv Plovdiv won the game after penalties and lifted their 2nd consecutive cup. This victory ensured their qualification to the first qualifying round of the 2020–21 UEFA Europa League. This was the first occasion in the history of the Cup finals in which a team from Plovdiv managed to prevail against a Sofia-based club - in the 15 previous instances the teams from the capital city had emerged victorious. Momchil Tsvetanov joined Krasimir Bezinski and Elin Topuzakov in becoming the player with most cup wins in the history of the tournament. This was his 6th cup in total with a 4th different club after 2008, 2009, 2016, 2018, and 2019.

== Route to the final ==
CSKA Sofia			Round	Lokomotiv Plovdiv
Opponent	Result	Legs		Opponent	Result	Legs
Lokomotiv Gorna Oryahovitsa	3–0	away	First round	Balkan Botevgrad	3–0	away
Arda Kardzhali	1–0	away	Second round	Litex Lovech	2–1	home
Botev Vratsa	2–1	home	Quarter-finals	CSKA 1948 Sofia	2–0	home
Botev Plovdiv	2–0 (agg.)	0–0 away; 2–0 home	Semi-finals	Levski Sofia	2–0 (agg.)	2–0 home; 0–0 away

== Match ==
=== Details ===
1 July 2020
19:15 EEST

CSKA Sofia	0−0 (a.e.t.)	Lokomotiv Plovdiv
	Report
Penalties
Zanev (penalty scored); Sowe (penalty missed); Geferson (penalty scored); Carey (penalty scored)	3−5	(penalty scored) Iliev; (penalty scored) Almeida; (penalty scored) Karagaren; (penalty scored) Malonga; (penalty scored) Tsvetanov

Vasil Levski National Stadium, Sofia
Attendance: 12,000
Referee: Georgi Kabakov (Plovdiv)

CSKA	Lokomotiv

GK	13	(Brazil) Gustavo Busatto
RB	19	(Bulgaria) Ivan Turitsov
CB	26	(Bulgaria) Valentin Antov	(yellow card) 46'
CB	11	(Bulgaria) Petar Zanev (c)	(yellow card) 86'
LB	18	(France) Bradley Mazikou
DM	15	(Bulgaria) Kristiyan Malinov	(yellow card) 29' (yellow-red card) 115'
DM	6	(Portugal) Rúben Pinto	(yellow card) 44'	(substituted off) 117'
RM	8	(Republic of Ireland) Graham Carey
AM	20	(Portugal) Tiago Rodrigues		(substituted off) 88'
LM	10	(Brazil) Evandro		(substituted off) 57'
CF	22	(The Gambia) Ali Sowe	(yellow card) 59'
Substitutes:
GK	30	(Lithuania) Vytautas Černiauskas
DF	3	(Brazil) Geferson		(substituted on) 111'
DF	28	(Bulgaria) Plamen Galabov		(substituted on) 117'
MF	17	(Brazil) Henrique		(substituted on) 57', (substituted off) 111'
MF	21	(Ghana) Edwin Gyasi
MF	24	(Italy) Stefano Beltrame		(substituted on) 88'
FW	23	(Bulgaria) Ahmed Ahmedov
Manager:
(Serbia) Miloš Kruščić

GK	71	(Bulgaria) Martin Lukov	(yellow card) 120+1'	(substituted off) 120+1'
CB	61	(Portugal) Dinis Almeida
CB	25	(Argentina) Lucas Masoero
CB	20	(Serbia) Miloš Petrović
RM	9	(Bulgaria) Bircent Karagaren	(yellow card) 82'
CM	10	(Tajikistan) Parvizdzhon Umarbayev		(substituted off) 110'
CM	34	(Bulgaria) Petar Vitanov
LM	50	(Croatia) Josip Tomašević
AM	16	(Brazil) Lucas Salinas		(substituted off) 88'
CF	14	(Bulgaria) Dimitar Iliev (c)
CF	77	(Croatia) Ante Aralica	(yellow card) 90+4'
Substitutes:
GK	1	(Bulgaria) Ilko Pirgov		(substituted on) 120+1'
DF	4	(Norway) Akinshola Akinyemi
MF	7	(Bulgaria) Momchil Tsvetanov		(substituted on) 88'
MF	13	(Croatia) Mihovil Klapan
MF	44	(Bulgaria) Nikolay Nikolaev
FW	11	(Austria) Kenan Muslimović
FW	23	(Republic of the Congo) Dominique Malonga		(substituted on) 110'
Manager:
(Bosnia and Herzegovina) Bruno Akrapović

Assistant referees:
Martin Margaritov (Plovdiv)
Diyan Valkov (Varna)
Fourth official:
Nikola Popov (Sofia)

Match rules

- 90 minutes.
- 30 minutes of extra time if necessary.
- Penalty shoot-out if scores still level.
- Seven named substitutes.
- Maximum of five substitutions, with a sixth allowed in extra time.
