= 2019 Bulgarian Cup final =

Финал за Купата на България 2019
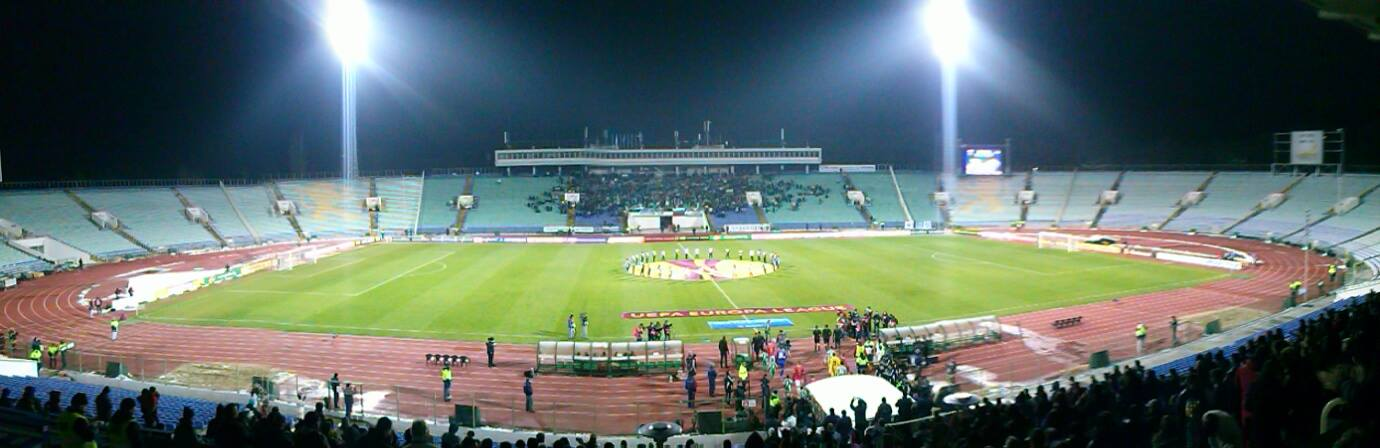
- Event: 2018–19 Bulgarian Cup
| Botev Plovdiv | Lokomotiv Plovdiv |
| 0 | 1 |
- Date: 15 May 2019
- Venue: Vasil Levski, Sofia
- Man of the Match: Alen Ožbolt
- Referee: Nikolay Yordanov (Sofia)
- Attendance: 20,500
- Weather: Partly cloudy 14 °C (57 °F)

The 2019 Bulgarian Cup final was the final match of the 2018–19 Bulgarian Cup and the 79th final of the Bulgarian Cup. The final took place on 15 May 2019 at Vasil Levski National Stadium, Sofia, Bulgaria. It was refereed by Nikolay Yordanov from Sofia.

The clubs contesting the final were Botev Plovdiv and Lokomotiv Plovdiv, who traditionally take part in the Plovdiv derby. Both teams have met on multiple occasions in the competition but never in the final itself.

Lokomotiv won the final with the score of 1–0, claiming their first ever Bulgarian Cup title.

== Route to the final ==
| Botev | | | Round | Lokomotiv |
|---|---|---|---|---|---|---|
| Opponent | Result | Legs | | Opponent | Result | Legs |
| CSKA 1948 Sofia | 4–1 | away | First round | Pomorie | 1–0 | away |
| Beroe Stara Zagora | 0–0 (a.e.t.) 4–3 (p) | away | Second round | Dunav Ruse | 2–1 | away |
| Cherno More Varna | 1–1 (a.e.t.) 3–1 (p) | home | Quarter-finals | Etar Veliko Tarnovo | 1–1 (a.e.t.) 7–6 (p) | away |
| CSKA Sofia | 6–5 (agg.) | 3–2 home; 3–3 away | Semi-finals | Septemvri Sofia | 4–0 (agg.) | 4–0 home; 0–0 away |

== Match ==
=== Details ===
15 May 2019
19:00 EEST

| Botev Plovdiv | 0–1 | Lokomotiv Plovdiv |
|---|---|---|
| | Report | Ožbolt 73' |

Vasil Levski National Stadium, Sofia
Attendance: 20,500
Referee: Nikolay Yordanov (Sofia)

| Botev | Lokomotiv |

| GK | 22 | (Poland) Daniel Kajzer |
| RB | 2 | (Brazil) Johnathan | | (substituted off) 46' |
| CB | 3 | (Bulgaria) Dimitar Pirgov |
| CB | 5 | (Bulgaria) Kristian Dimitrov |
| LB | 24 | (Bulgaria) Lazar Marin |
| DM | 18 | (Bulgaria) Radoslav Terziev | | (substituted off) 77' |
| RM | 66 | (Brazil) Ebert | (yellow card) 19' | (substituted off) 53' |
| AM | 17 | (Bulgaria) Lachezar Baltanov (c) |
| AM | 8 | (Bulgaria) Todor Nedelev |
| LM | 7 | (Bulgaria) Aleksandar Tonev | (yellow card) 88' |
| CF | 39 | (Bulgaria) Antonio Vutov |
Substitutes:
| GK | 99 | (Bulgaria) Ivan Čvorović |
| DF | 6 | (Bulgaria) Kostadin Nichev |
| FW | 10 | (Republic of the Congo) Férébory Doré | | (substituted on) 53' |
| FW | 11 | (Bulgaria) Kristian Dobrev |
| MF | 16 | (Bulgaria) Vasil Shopov | | (substituted on) 77' |
| MF | 26 | (Bulgaria) Radoslav Apostolov |
| DF | 28 | (Bulgaria) Filip Filipov | | (substituted on) 46' |
Manager:
(Bulgaria) Nikolay Kirov

| GK | 71 | (Bulgaria) Martin Lukov | (yellow card) 82' |
| CB | 15 | (Bulgaria) Dimitar Vezalov |
| CB | 6 | (Nigeria) Stephen Eze |
| CB | 50 | (Croatia) Josip Tomašević |
| RM | 91 | (Belgium) Abdelhakim Bouhna |
| CM | 20 | (Serbia) Miloš Petrović | | (substituted off) 60' |
| CM | 34 | (Croatia) Igor Banović |
| LM | 7 | (Bulgaria) Momchil Tsvetanov |
| AM | 14 | (Bulgaria) Dimitar Iliev (c) |
| CF | 12 | (Slovenia) Alen Ožbolt | 73' | (yellow card) 74' | (substituted off) 78' |
| CF | 77 | (Croatia) Ante Aralica | (yellow card) 53' | (substituted off) 89' |
Substitutes:
| GK | 1 | (Bulgaria) Ilko Pirgov |
| DF | 5 | (Bulgaria) Asen Georgiev | | (substituted on) 89' |
| MF | 9 | (Bulgaria) Bircent Karagaren | | (substituted on) 78' |
| MF | 10 | (Tajikistan) Parvizdzhon Umarbayev |
| MF | 13 | (Austria) Edin Bahtić |
| MF | 29 | (Bulgaria) Yanko Angelov | | (substituted on) 60' |
| MF | 61 | (Brazil) Eliton Junior |
Manager:
(Bosnia and Herzegovina) Bruno Akrapović

Assistant referees:
Veselin Mishev (Sofia)
Georgi Todorov (Sofia)
Fourth official:
Georgi Kabakov (Plovdiv)

Match rules

- 90 minutes.
- 30 minutes of extra time if necessary.
- Penalty shoot-out if scores still level.
- Seven named substitutes.
- Maximum of three substitutions, with a fourth allowed in extra time.
