= 2020 Bulgarian Supercup =

Финал за Суперкупата на България 2020
Ludogorets	Lokomotiv Plovdiv
First League	Bulgarian Cup
0	1
- Date: 2 August 2020
- Venue: Huvepharma Arena, Razgrad
- Referee: Volen Chinkov (Sofia)
- Attendance: no spectators
- Weather: Sunny; 26 °C (79 °F)

The 2020 Bulgarian Supercup was the 17th Bulgarian Supercup, an annual Bulgarian football match played between the winners of the previous season's First Professional Football League and Bulgarian Cup. The game was played between the champions of the 2019-20 First League, Ludogorets Razgrad, and the 2020 Bulgarian Cup winners, Lokomotiv Plovdiv.

This was Ludogorets's eighth Bulgarian Supercup appearance and Lokomotiv Plovdiv's fourth. The two teams played each other twice: in 2012 and in last season. On both occasions Ludogorets won the trophy.

Lokomotiv Plovdiv won their second supercup following their success in 2004. The goal was scored by Dimitar Iliev.

== Match details ==
2 August 2020
20:30 UTC+3

Ludogorets Razgrad	0−1	Lokomotiv Plovdiv
	Report	D. Iliev 89'

Huvepharma Arena, Razgrad
Attendance: 0
Referee: Volen Chinkov (Sofia)

Ludogorets	Lokomotiv

GK	33	(Brazil) Renan
RB	22	(Democratic Republic of the Congo) Jordan Ikoko	(red card) 64'
CB	21	(Romania) Dragoș Grigore	(yellow card) 72'
CB	5	(Bulgaria) Georgi Terziev (c)
LB	6	(Israel) Taleb Tawatha
CM	7	(Brazil) Alex Santana		(substituted off) 70'
CM	12	(Madagascar) Anicet Abel
RW	95	(Brazil) Cauly
AM	8	(Israel) Dan Biton		(substituted off) 70'
LW	17	(Guinea-Bissau) Jorginho		(substituted off) 57'
CF	13	(Republic of the Congo) Mavis Tchibota	(yellow card) 61'	(substituted off) 83'
Substitutes:
GK	27	(Bulgaria) Vladislav Stoyanov
DF	30	(Romania) Cosmin Moți		(substituted in) 70'
MF	18	(Bulgaria) Svetoslav Dyakov		(substituted in) 70'
MF	64	(Bulgaria) Dominik Yankov		(substituted in) 83'
MF	82	(Bulgaria) Ivan Yordanov
FW	28	(Romania) Claudiu Keșerü		(substituted in) 57'
Manager:
(Czech Republic) Pavel Vrba

GK	71	(Bulgaria) Martin Lukov
CB	61	(Portugal) Dinis Almeida
CB	25	(Argentina) Lucas Masoero	(yellow card) 64'
CB	20	(Serbia) Miloš Petrović	(yellow card) 25'
RM	9	(Bulgaria) Bircent Karagaren
CM	34	(Bulgaria) Petar Vitanov		(substituted off) 15'
CM	10	(Tajikistan) Parvizdzhon Umarbayev
LM	50	(Croatia) Josip Tomašević
AM	16	(Brazil) Lucas Salinas	(yellow card) 90'	(substituted off) 90+3'
CF	14	(Bulgaria) Dimitar Iliev (c)	89'	(yellow card) 90'
CF	77	(Croatia) Ante Aralica	(yellow card) 73'	(substituted off) 78'
Substitutes:
GK	1	(Bulgaria) Ilko Pirgov
DF	5	(Mozambique) David Malembana		(substituted in) 15'
MF	7	(Bulgaria) Momchil Tsvetanov		(substituted in) 90+3'
MF	44	(Bulgaria) Nikolay Nikolaev
FW	11	(Austria) Kenan Muslimović
FW	19	(Bulgaria) Georgi Minchev		(substituted in) 78'
Manager:
(Bosnia and Herzegovina) Bruno Akrapović (formally) (Bulgaria) Aleksandar Tunchev (de facto for the final)

MATCH OFFICIALS

- Assistant referees:
  - Deniz Sokolov (Sofia)
  - Dimitar Stoilov (Kyustendil)
- Fourth official: Dragomir Draganov (Varna)

MATCH RULES

- 90 minutes.
- Penalty shoot-out if scores still level.
- Six named substitutes, of which five may be used

== Post-match reactions ==
Lokomotiv Plovdiv owner Hristo Krusharski was overjoyed due to the victory, claiming that he had a premonition before the game, praising the collective efforts of the team and expressing the viewpoint that the "railwaymen" have great ambitions for the European tournaments and the next season in the league, hoping to make up for the disappointing finish outside the top 3 in the previous campaign. Assistant manager Aleksandar Tunchev who was in charge of the team during the Supercup because of Bruno Akrapović serving a suspension expressed his gratitude to the players, some of whom were returning from a quarantine and also insisted that everyone should remain focused on the upcoming matches. Lokomotiv captain Dimitar Iliev was satisfied that his team had been quite convincing and dominated the hosts from Razgrad unlike any other. Sports director Georgi Ivanov regarded Lokomotiv's consistency as an indication of the team's class and expressed hope that the inertia the team had accumulated would carry over into the 2020/2021 season. Ludogorets manager Pavel Vrba acknowledged issues with the team performance, especially when it came to the offensive players, as well as ill-discipline leading to the red card, though he also insisted that Jordan Ikoko had been provoked. Ludogorets captain Svetoslav Dyakov considered his team's play to have been poor and emphasized the need for the right lessons to be drawn for the next matches.
