= Dimitar Iliev (footballer, born 1988) =

Bulgarian footballer

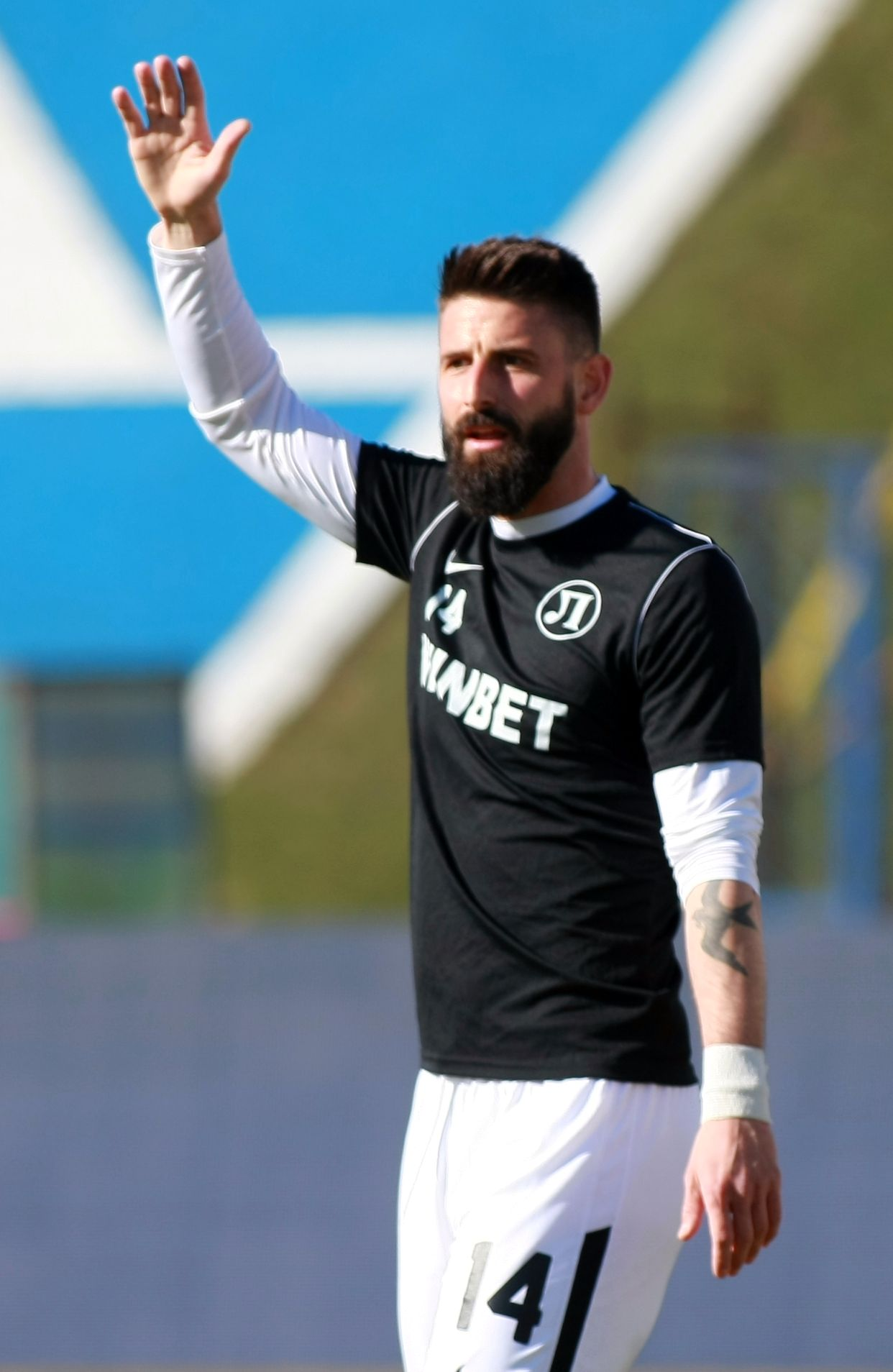
- Iliev in 2022

Personal information
- Full name: Dimitar Krasimirov Iliev
- Date of birth: 25 September 1988 (age 38)
- Place of birth: Plovdiv, Bulgaria
- Height: 1.85 m (6 ft 1 in)
- Positions: Attacking midfielder; forward

Youth career
- 1997–2004: Lokomotiv Plovdiv

Senior career*
Years	Team	Apps	(Gls)
2004–2009	Lokomotiv Plovdiv	73	(14)
2010–2011	CSKA Sofia	5	(0)
2010	→ Minyor Pernik (loan)	14	(5)
2011	→ Pirin Blagoevgrad (loan)	12	(3)
2011–2012	Montana	27	(2)
2012–2014	Lokomotiv Sofia	57	(10)
2014–2017	Wisła Płock	90	(11)
2017–2018	Podbeskidzie Bielsko-Biała	23	(3)
2018–2026	Lokomotiv Plovdiv	232	(65)
Total		533	(113)

International career
2004–2005	Bulgaria U17	6	(5)
2006–2007	Bulgaria U19		
2008–2009	Bulgaria U21	2	(0)
2020–2021	Bulgaria	13	(3)
- * Club domestic league appearances and goals

Dimitar Krasimirov Iliev (Bulgarian: Димитър Красимиров Илиев, born 25 September 1988) is a Bulgarian former professional footballer who played as an attacking midfielder or forward. He won the Bulgarian Footballer of the Year award in 2019 and 2020.

== Club career ==
Iliev began his career in the youth ranks of Lokomotiv Plovdiv. After making his way through the various youth levels at the club, he debuted for the senior team in a 4–1 home win over Lokomotiv Sofia on 11 September 2004, aged 15. In November 2004, Iliev had a trial spell with Chelsea.

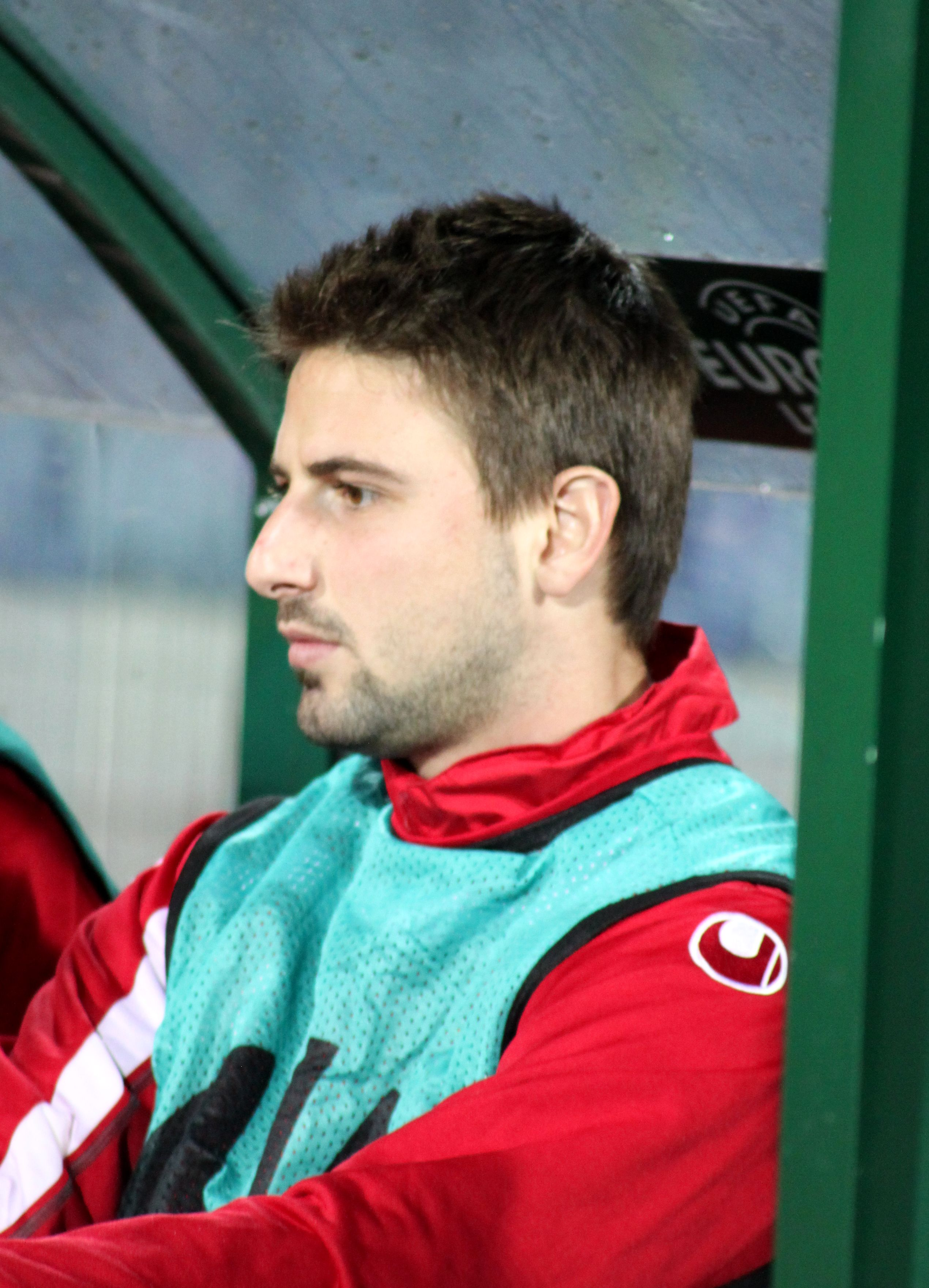
Iliev with CSKA Sofia in 2010

In January 2010, Iliev signed for CSKA Sofia, but struggled to get into the main squad and spent loan spells at Minyor Pernik and Pirin Blagoevgrad, before joining Montana on a permanent basis in August 2011.

After one season with Montana, Iliev joined Lokomotiv Sofia, where he spent two seasons before moving to Poland to sign for Wisła Płock in 2014. In 2015–16, his second season with the club, Iliev helped Wisła achieve promotion to the Ekstraklasa. He spent three full seasons with Wisła before moving to Podbeskidzie Bielsko-Biała in 2017 where he spent one season.

On 16 July 2018, Iliev re-joined Lokomotiv Plovdiv, signing a two-year contract. At the end of the season he lifted the Bulgarian Cup as a captain of his childhood team. The 1–0 win against local rivals Botev Plovdiv was achieved with the only goal in 73rd minute scored by Alen Ožbolt (assist by Ante Aralica and pre-assist by Iliev himself). It happened to be the first Bulgarian Cup trophy for Lokomotiv as well as the 1st ever trophy in Iliev's career. On 2 August 2020, Iliev scored a last-minute goal against Ludogorets Razgrad, helping his team to a 1–0 win and a Bulgarian Supercup triumph.

== International career ==
In November 2019, Iliev received his first call up to the national team for the friendly match against Paraguay and the UEFA Euro 2020 Qualification match against the Czech Republic, but remained an unused substitute for both games. He earned his first cap on 26 February 2020, playing the first half of the 0–1 home loss against Belarus in a friendly game.

== Career statistics ==
=== Club ===
As of 30 May 2025

Appearances and goals by club, season and competition
Club	Season	League			Cup (Note: Includes Bulgarian Supercup matches.)		Continental		Other		Total	
Club	Season	Division	Apps	Goals	Apps	Goals	Apps	Goals	Apps	Goals	Apps	Goals
Lokomotiv Plovdiv	2004–05	A Group	3	0	0	0	0	0	—		3	0
Lokomotiv Plovdiv	2005–06	A Group	11	0	1	1	0	0	—		12	1
Lokomotiv Plovdiv	2006–07	A Group	12	3	1	0	1	0	—		14	3
Lokomotiv Plovdiv	2007–08	A Group	9	1	2	0	—		—		11	1
Lokomotiv Plovdiv	2008–09	A Group	25	7	1	0	—		—		26	7
Lokomotiv Plovdiv	2009–10	A Group	13	3	0	0	—		—		13	3
Lokomotiv Plovdiv	Total		73	14	5	1	1	0	0	0	80	14
CSKA Sofia	2009–10	A Group	0	0	0	0	0	0	—		0	0
CSKA Sofia	2010–11	A Group	5	0	1	0	4	0	—		10	0
CSKA Sofia	Total		5	0	1	0	4	0	0	0	10	0
Minyor Pernik (loan)	2009–10	A Group	14	5	1	0	—		—		15	5
Pirin Blagoevgrad (loan)	2010–11	A Group	12	3	1	0	—		—		13	3
Montana	2011–12	A Group	27	2	0	0	—		—		27	2
Lokomotiv Sofia	2012–13	A Group	26	4	5	2	—		—		31	6
Lokomotiv Sofia	2013–14	A Group	31	6	5	0	—		—		36	6
Lokomotiv Sofia	Total		57	10	10	2	0	0	0	0	67	12
Wisła Płock	2014–15	I liga	32	5	0	0	—		—		32	5
Wisła Płock	2015–16	I liga	29	3	1	0	—		—		30	3
Wisła Płock	2016–17	Ekstraklasa	29	3	0	0	—		—		29	3
Wisła Płock	Total		90	11	1	0	0	0	0	0	91	11
Podbeskidzie Bielsko-Biała	2017–18	I liga	23	3	3	0	—		—		26	3
Lokomotiv Plovdiv	2018–19	First League	29	9	6	2	—		—		35	11
Lokomotiv Plovdiv	2019–20	First League	27	12	7	5	4	2	—		38	19
Lokomotiv Plovdiv	2020–21	First League	30	13	4	3	2	1	—		36	17
Lokomotiv Plovdiv	2021–22	First League	31	13	3	2	4	2	—		38	17
Lokomotiv Plovdiv	2022–23	First League	35	4	2	0	—		—		37	4
Lokomotiv Plovdiv	2023–24	First League	33	4	2	0	—		—		35	4
Lokomotiv Plovdiv	2024–25	First League	31	8	1	0	—		1	0	33	8
Lokomotiv Plovdiv	Total		216	63	25	12	10	5	1	0	252	80
Career statistics			517	111	45	15	15	5	1	0	578	131

=== International ===
Scores and results list Bulgaria's goal tally first.

No.	Date	Venue	Opponent	Score	Result	Competition
1	11 November 2020	Vasil Levski National Stadium, Sofia, Bulgaria	Gibraltar	3–0	3–0	Friendly
2	15 November 2020	Vasil Levski National Stadium, Sofia, Bulgaria	Finland	1–2	1–2	2020–21 UEFA Nations League B
3	8 September 2021	Vasil Levski National Stadium, Sofia, Bulgaria	Georgia	2–0	4–1	Friendly

== Honours ==
Lokomotiv Plovdiv

- Bulgarian Cup: 2018–19, 2019–20
- Bulgarian Supercup: 2020

Individual

- Bulgarian Footballer of the Year: 2019, 2020
- Bulgarian First League Best Forward: 2019
- Bulgarian First League Best youth forward: 2006
- Plovdiv Best Footballer: 2019, 2020, 2021
- Bulgarian First League Goal of the Week: 2021–22
