= Alen Ožbolt =

Slovenian footballer (born 1996)

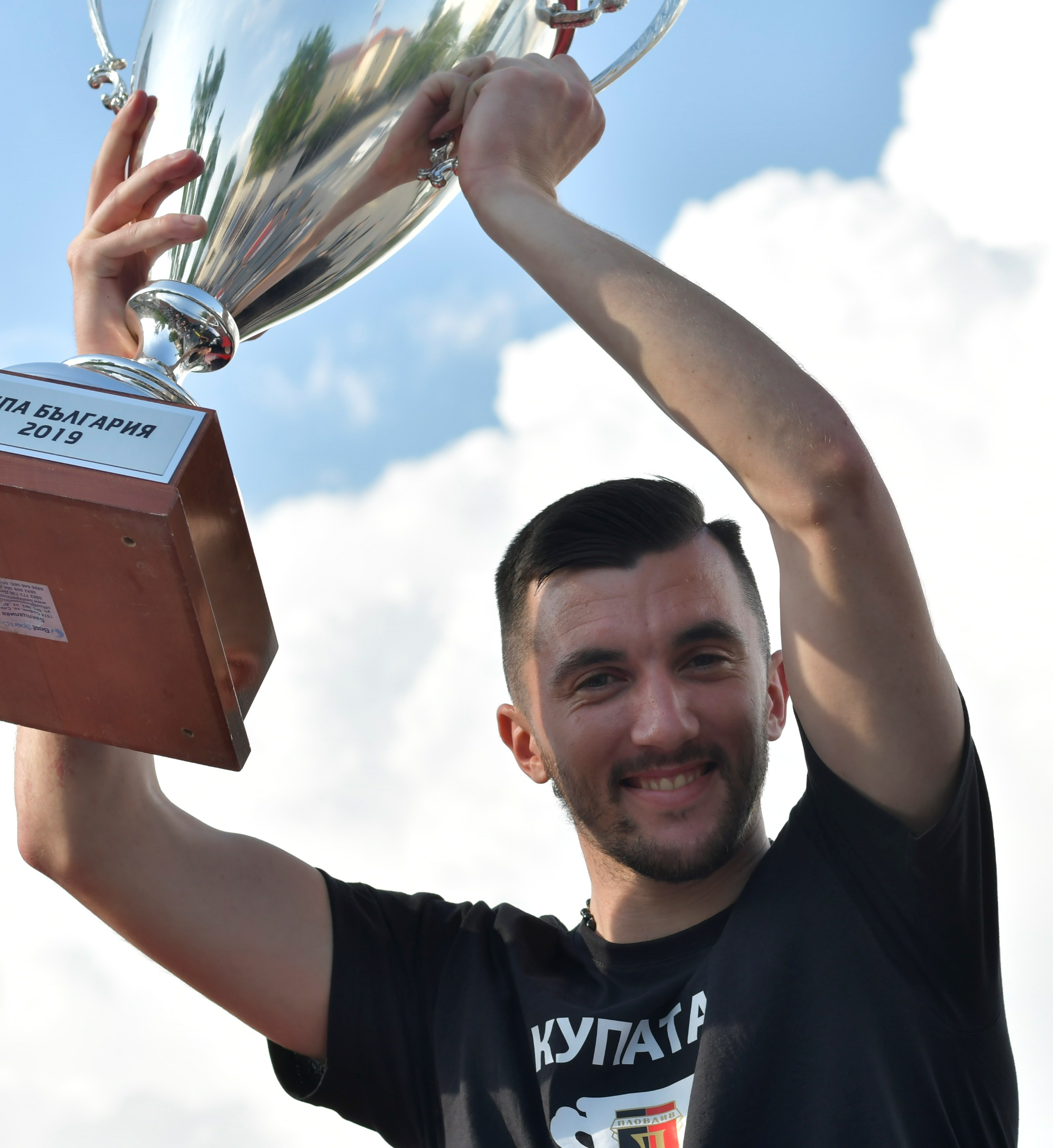
- Ožbolt with the Bulgarian Cup in 2019

Personal information
- Date of birth: 24 June 1996 (age 30)
- Place of birth: Novo Mesto, Slovenia
- Height: 1.82 m (6 ft 0 in)
- Position: Forward

Team information
- Current team: Apollon Limassol
- Number: 9

Youth career
- Fužina Dvor
- Livar
- Krka
- 2009–2015: Domžale

Senior career*
Years	Team	Apps	(Gls)
2013–2018	Domžale	40	(7)
2015–2016	→ Borussia Dortmund II (loan)	29	(3)
2018	TSV Hartberg	6	(0)
2018–2020	Lokomotiv Plovdiv	43	(13)
2020–2022	Slovan Bratislava	27	(7)
2020–2021	Slovan Bratislava B	3	(2)
2021–2022	→ Hapoel Haifa (loan)	29	(11)
2022–2024	Hapoel Tel Aviv	59	(16)
2024–2026	Levadiakos	54	(19)
2026–	Apollon Limassol	6	(5)

International career
2011–2012	Slovenia U16	9	(3)
2011–2013	Slovenia U17	9	(3)
2014	Slovenia U19	12	(7)
2015–2018	Slovenia U21	23	(10)
- * Club domestic league appearances and goals as of 1 November 2026

Alen Ožbolt (born 24 June 1996) is a Slovenian professional footballer who plays as a forward for Cypriot First Division club Apollon Limassol. He has been capped for Slovenia at all youth levels from under-16 to under-21.

== Club career ==
Ožbolt began his career at Domžale and spent loan spell at Borussia Dortmund II, before joining Austrian club TSV Hartberg on a permanent basis in early 2018. However, he left Hartberg at the end of the 2017–18 season and joined Bulgarian club Lokomotiv Plovdiv as a free agent.

=== Lokomotiv Plovdiv ===
Ožbolt signed with Lokomotiv on 16 September 2018 on a three-year deal. Six days later, he made his debut in a 3–1 away league victory over Septemvri Sofia, replacing Bircent Karagaren late in the game. On 15 May 2019, Ožbolt scored the winning goal in the 2019 Bulgarian Cup final against Botev Plovdiv, which gave Lokomotiv their first Bulgarian Cup. He ended his debut season for Lokomotiv with 8 goals in 29 appearances in all competitions.

=== Slovan Bratislava ===
On 11 January 2020, Ožbolt joined Slovan Bratislava on a four-and-a-half-year contract.

== Career statistics ==
As of match played 31 October 2026

Appearances and goals by club, season and competition
Club	Season	Division	League		National cup (Note: Includes Slovenian Football Cup, Austrian Cup, Bulgarian Cup, Slovak Cup, Israel State Cup, Greek Football Cup)		League cup (Note: Includes Toto Cup)		Continental		Total	
Club	Season	Division	Apps	Goals	Apps	Goals	Apps	Goals	Apps	Goals	Apps	Goals
Domžale	2013–14	Slovenian PrvaLiga	6	0	1	0	—		—		7	0
Domžale	2014–15	Slovenian PrvaLiga	19	3	4	1	—		—		23	4
Domžale	2016–17	Slovenian PrvaLiga	9	2	2	0	—		0	0	11	2
Domžale	2017–18	Slovenian PrvaLiga	6	2	1	0	—		5 (Note: Appearances in UEFA Europa League)	0	12	2
Domžale	Total		40	7	8	1	—		5	0	53	8
Borussia Dortmund II (loan)	2015–16	Regionalliga	26	3	—		—		—		26	3
Borussia Dortmund II (loan)	2016–17	Regionalliga	3	0	—		—		—		3	0
Borussia Dortmund II (loan)	Total		29	3	—		—		—		29	3
TSV Hartberg	2017–18	Austrian Football Second League	6	0	1	0	—		—		7	0
Lokomotiv Plovdiv	2018–19	Bulgarian First League	23	7	6	1	—		—		29	8
Lokomotiv Plovdiv	2019–20	Bulgarian First League	20	6	2	1	—		4	1	26	8
Lokomotiv Plovdiv	Total		43	13	8	2	—		4	1	55	16
Slovan Bratislava	2019–20	Slovak Super Liga	6	1	4	3	—		—		10	4
Slovan Bratislava	2020–21	Slovak Super Liga	21	6	4	4	—		1	0	26	10
Slovan Bratislava	Total		27	7	8	7	—		1	0	36	14
Hapoel Haifa	2021–22	Israeli Premier League	29	11	4	1	3	0	—		36	12
Hapoel Tel Aviv	2022–23	Israeli Premier League	29	11	1	0	5	2	—		35	13
Hapoel Tel Aviv	2023–24	Israeli Premier League	30	5	0	0	0	0	—		30	5
Hapoel Tel Aviv	Total		59	16	1	0	5	2	—		65	18
Levadiakos	2024–25	Super League Greece	30	8	1	0	—		—		31	8
Levadiakos	2025–26	Super League Greece	24	11	5	0	—		—		29	11
Levadiakos	Total		54	19	6	0	—		—		60	19
Apollon Limassol	2026–27	Cypriot First Division	6	5	0	0	—		4	2	10	7
Career total			293	81	36	11	8	2	14	3	351	97

== Honours ==
=== Club ===
Domžale

- Slovenian Cup: 2016–17

Lokomotiv Plovdiv

- Bulgarian Cup: 2018–19

Slovan Bratislava

- Slovak Super Liga: 2019–20, 2020–21
- Slovak Cup: 2019–20, 2020–21

==== Individual ====
- Bulgarian First League Goal of the Year: 2019
