= Momchil Tsvetanov =

Bulgarian footballer (born 1990)

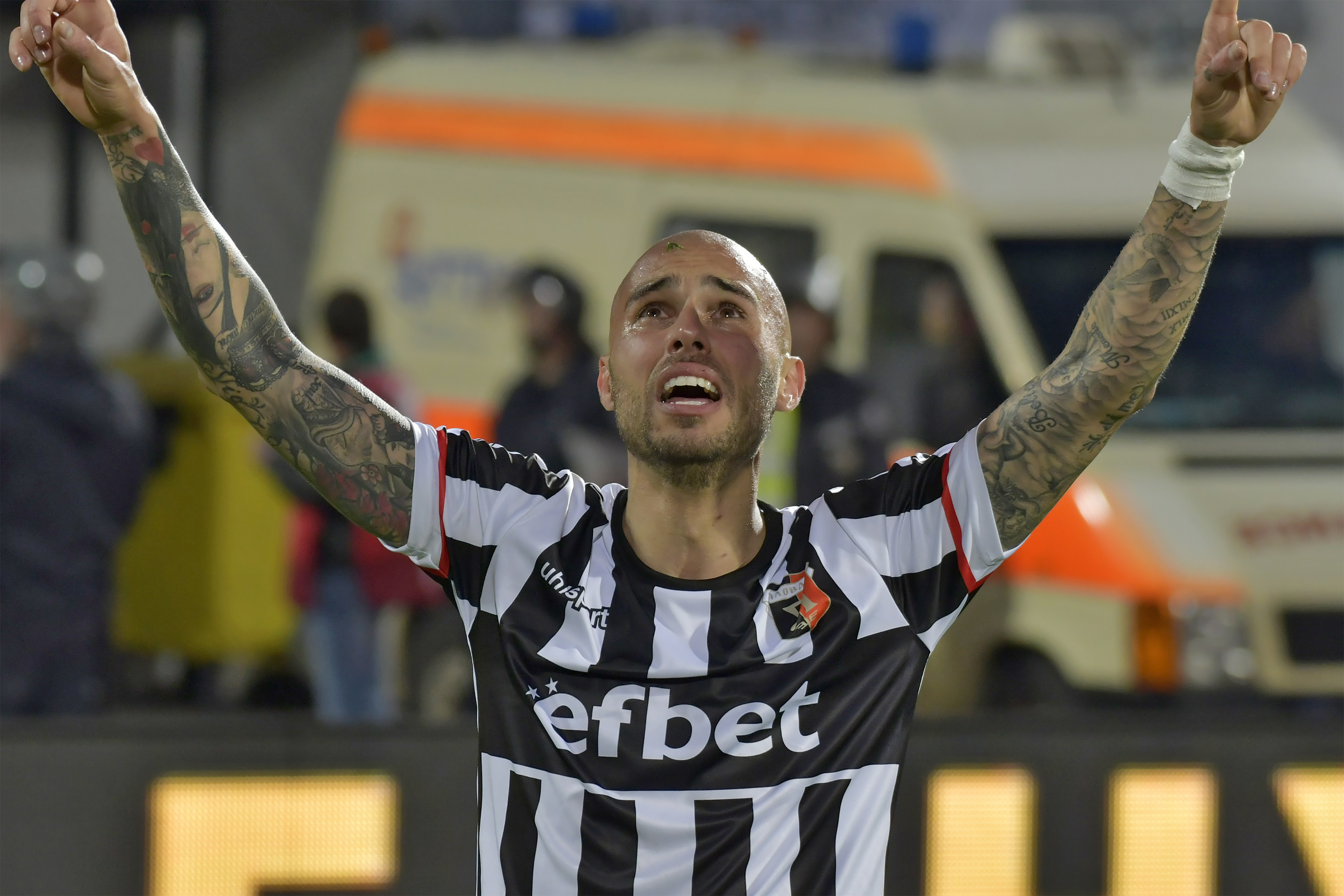
- Tsvetanov with Lokomotiv Plovdiv in 2019

Personal information
- Full name: Momchil Emilov Tsvetanov
- Date of birth: 3 December 1990 (age 35)
- Place of birth: Pleven, Bulgaria
- Height: 1.75 m (5 ft 9 in)
- Positions: Left-back; winger

Team information
- Current team: Krumovgrad
- Number: 7

Youth career
- –2006: Spartak Pleven

Senior career*
Years	Team	Apps	(Gls)
2006–2007	Spartak Pleven	27	(7)
2008–2014	Litex Lovech	118	(14)
2014–2015	Botev Plovdiv	15	(0)
2015–2016	CSKA Sofia	18	(8)
2016–2017	Vereya	19	(5)
2017	Stal Mielec	3	(0)
2018	Slavia Sofia	22	(0)
2019–2021	Lokomotiv Plovdiv	64	(4)
2021–2022	Gangwon FC	17	(0)
2021–2022	Gangwon FC Reserve	1	(0)
2022	Anagennisi Karditsa	5	(0)
2023	Botev Vratsa	31	(1)
2023–2025	Krumovgrad	44	(1)
2025–2026	Hebar Pazardzhik	22	(3)
2026–	Krumovgrad	0	(0)

International career
2008	Bulgaria U19		
2008–2012	Bulgaria U21	14	(6)
2021	Bulgaria	7	(0)
- * Club domestic league appearances and goals as of 11 June 2026

Momchil Emilov Tsvetanov (Bulgarian: Момчил Емилов Цветанов; born 3 December 1990) is a Bulgarian professional footballer who plays for Krumovgrad. Although he predominantly plays as a winger, he has also been deployed as a left-back.

A product of Spartak Pleven's youth academy, he has represented Bulgaria at all youth levels. Tsvetanov was part of U19 squad for the 2008 UEFA European Under-19 Championship.

== Club career ==
=== Spartak Pleven ===
Born in Pleven, Tsvetanov began his career playing for local club Spartak. On 9 September 2006, at the age of 16 he made his professional debut in the B Group, playing the second half of a 3–0 defeat to Minyor Pernik. He scored his first goal on 7 April 2007 against Hebar Pazardzhik in a 2–0 home league victory. He made 15 league appearances, scoring three goals during his debut season. In the following season Tsvetanov scored four goals in 12 matches.

=== Litex Lovech ===
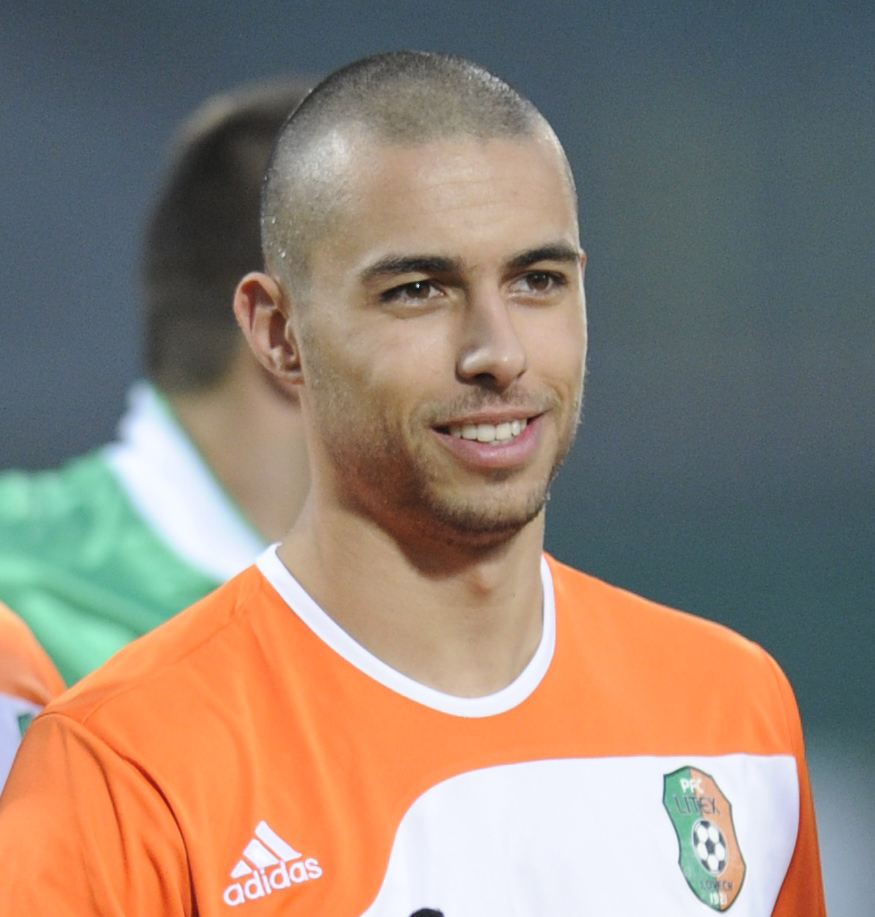
Tsvetanov with Litex Lovech in 2012

In January 2008, Tsvetanov joined Litex Lovech on a four-and-a-half-year contract for an undisclosed fee. He made his competitive debut in the A Group in a 0–0 draw against CSKA Sofia on 1 March 2008. He played for 45 minutes.

On 12 July 2011, Tsvetanov assisted Svetoslav Todorov twice in a 2–1 away win over Mogren Budva in the second qualifying round of the 2011–12 Champions League.

=== Botev Plovdiv ===
After six years in Lovech, Tsvetanov surprisingly signed a two-year contract with Botev Plovdiv as a free agent on 21 August 2014. He made his league debut for Botev three days later when he came on as 73rd-minute substitute in a match against Slavia Sofia which Botev won 2–0.

Momchil Tsvetanov played in 14 games in A Grupa and 3 games for the Bulgarian Cup without scoring any goals and without making any assists. He failed to impress and at the end of the season his contract was terminated by mutual agreement.

=== CSKA Sofia ===
On 30 June 2015, Tsvetanov joined CSKA Sofia. He lost his first choice status when the team was reinstated to the A PFG.

=== Vereya ===
In July 2016, he signed a contract with newly promoted top division club Vereya.

=== Stal Mielec ===
On 11 July 2017, Tsvetanov signed with I liga side Stal Mielec.

=== Slavia Sofia ===
On 5 February 2018, Tsvetanov confirmed to the media that he had signed with Slavia Sofia.

On 12 July 2018, Tsvetanov scored his first-ever goal in European competition, netting only goal in a 1–0 away win against FC Ilves in the first qualifying round of the 2018–19 UEFA Europa League.

=== Lokomotiv Plovdiv ===
On 15 June 2019, Tsvetanov won his 5th Bulgarian Cup and 1st for his new club Lokomotiv Plovdiv. On 1 July 2020 he won the Bulgarian Cup again, scoring the last penalty kick in the shoot-out against CSKA Sofia.

=== Gangwon FC ===
On 20 July 2021, Korean K League 1 side Gangwon FC announced they have signed Tsvetanov.

=== Krumovgrad ===
In December 2023, Tsvetanov joined Krumovgrad.

== International career ==
Tsvetanov made his debut for Bulgaria national team on 25 March 2021 in a World Cup qualifier against Switzerland.

== Career statistics ==
As of 8 December 2024

Appearances and goals by club, season and competition
Club	Season	League			Cup (Note: Includes Bulgarian Supercup matches.)		Europe		Other		Total	
Club	Season	Division	Apps	Goals	Apps	Goals	Apps	Goals	Apps	Goals	Apps	Goals
Spartak Pleven	2006–07	B Group	15	3	0	0	–		–		15	3
Spartak Pleven	2007–08	B Group	12	4	1	0	–		–		13	4
Spartak Pleven	Total		27	7	1	0	0	0	0	0	28	7
Litex Lovech	2007–08	A Group	7	0	1	0	0	0	–		8	0
Litex Lovech	2008–09	A Group	15	0	3	1	1	0	–		19	1
Litex Lovech	2009–10	A Group	4	1	2	1	0	0	–		6	2
Litex Lovech	2010–11	A Group	22	3	4	0	2	0	–		28	3
Litex Lovech	2011–12	A Group	22	5	3	2	4	0	–		29	7
Litex Lovech	2012–13	A Group	16	0	3	0	–		–		19	0
Litex Lovech	2013–14	A Group	31	5	3	2	–		–		34	7
Litex Lovech	2014–15	A Group	1	0	0	0	3	0	–		4	0
Litex Lovech	Total		118	14	19	6	11	0	0	0	147	20
Botev Plovdiv	2014–15	A Group	15	0	2	0	0	0	–		17	0
CSKA Sofia	2015–16	V Group	18	8	3	1	–		–		21	9
Vereya	2016–17	First League	19	5	5	0	–		–		24	5
Stal Mielec	2017–18	I liga	3	0	2	0	–		–		5	0
Slavia Sofia	2017–18	First League	8	0	0	0	–		–		8	0
Slavia Sofia	2018–19	First League	14	0	3	0	4	1	–		21	1
Slavia Sofia	Total		22	0	3	0	4	1	0	0	29	1
Lokomotiv Plovdiv	2018–19	First League	10	0	4	1	–		–		14	1
Lokomotiv Plovdiv	2019–20	First League	24	0	7	0	4	0	–		35	0
Lokomotiv Plovdiv	2020–21	First League	30	4	3	0	2	0	1	0	37	4
Lokomotiv Plovdiv	Total		64	4	14	1	6	0	1	0	85	5
Gangwon FC	2021	K League 1	12	0	1	0	–		2	0	15	0
Gangwon FC	2022	K League 1	5	0	0	0	–		–		5	0
Gangwon FC	Total		17	0	1	0	0	0	2	0	20	0
Gangwon FC Reserve	2021	K4 League	1	0	–		–		–		1	0
Anagennisi Karditsa	2022–23	Super League Greece 2	5	0	–		–		–		5	0
Botev Vratsa	2022–23	First League	14	0	0	0	–		–		14	0
Botev Vratsa	2023–24	First League	17	1	2	0	–		–		19	1
Botev Vratsa	Total		31	1	2	0	0	0	0	0	33	1
Krumovgrad	2023–24	First League	10	0	0	0	–		–		10	0
Krumovgrad	2024–25	First League	17	0	2	0	–		–		19	0
Krumovgrad	Total		27	0	2	0	0	0	0	0	29	0
Career total			362	39	54	8	22	1	3	0	441	48

== Honours ==
Litex Lovech

- Bulgarian League: 2009–10, 2010–11
- Bulgarian Cup: 2007–08, 2008–09
- Bulgarian Supercup: 2010

CSKA Sofia

- Bulgarian Cup: 2015–16

Slavia Sofia

- Bulgarian Cup: 2017–18

Lokomotiv Plovdiv

- Bulgarian Cup: 2018–19, 2019–20
- Bulgarian Supercup: 2020
