= PFC Lokomotiv Plovdiv =

Bulgarian association football club

Lokomotiv Plovdiv
- Full name: Professional Football Club Lokomotiv Plovdiv; Професионален Футболен Клуб Локомотив Пловдив
- Nicknames: Черно-белите (The Black-Whites); Смърфовете (The Smurfs); Железничарите (The Railwaymen)
- Short name: LOKO PD, LPFC
- Founded: 25 July 1926; 100 years ago
- Ground: Hristo Bonev Stadium
- Capacity: 10,000
- Chairman: Hristo Krusharski
- Head Coach: Dušan Kosič
- League: First League
- 2025–26: First League, 5th of 16
- Website: lokomotivpd.com
Home colours	Away colours	Third colours

PFC Lokomotiv Plovdiv (Bulgarian: ПФК Локомотив Пловдив), commonly known as Loko Plovdiv, is a Bulgarian professional association football club based in Plovdiv. Lokomotiv's home ground is the Hristo Bonev Stadium, which is situated in Lauta Park and has a capacity of 10,000 spectators.

Founded on 25 July 1926, Lokomotiv is one of the most popular teams in Bulgaria and currently competes in the top-flight First Professional Football League, which they have won once (in 2004). Lokomotiv Plovdiv has won also two Bulgarian Cups, two Bulgarian Supercups and one Cup of the Soviet Army. The biggest success of the club in Europe is reaching the third round of the Inter-Cities Fairs Cup in 1965, after narrowly losing to the Italian Juventus in a play-off match.

Lokomotiv have a fierce local rivalry with fellow Plovdiv-based team Botev Plovdiv. Matches between the two sides are known as the Plovdiv derby.

== History ==
Throughout the club's history, it has undergone a number of complex reorganisations. These were in part due to the political environment in Bulgaria during the communist period (1944–1989) which led to enforced changes in the nature of sporting clubs throughout the country in order to follow the "Soviet model". For PFC Lokomotiv Plovdiv, these changes led to the merger of two separate existing teams, different in nature, which in turn has led to misinterpretations of the history of the teams. In order to understand the origin of the contemporary team, Lokomotiv's history can be divided into two major branches – one defined largely by its followers (Sportclub Plovdiv), and the other by its functional characteristics, association with the railway, and funding as a labour union team (ZSK Plovdiv).

=== Roots of the Club (until 1944) ===
==== Sportclub Plovdiv ====
In the spring of 1922, the sport club Karadzha was founded when several casual amateur football teams in one of the districts of Plovdiv consolidated so the players could compete in the Championship of Plovdiv. Two years later, in 1924, another sport club called Atletik was formed in the same district.

On 25 July 1926 Karadzha and Atletik merged to form Sportclub. The team chose white, black and red as the colours for their kits and crest. Several years later, the year of establishment (1926) was added to the crest. Lokomotiv Plovdiv still uses the same colours, while their full name (Professional Football Club Lokomotiv 1926 Plovdiv) shows the club's beginnings as the same year in which Sportclub was founded.

Sportclub had its home ground in the city centre. However, after the 1928 earthquakes, the team donated its land to those who had lost their homes so they could rebuild there. From 1928 on, Sportclub did not have their own football field for more than two decades.

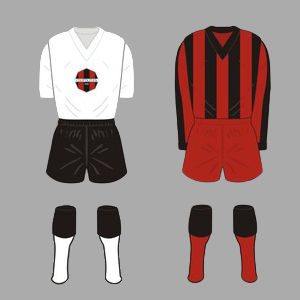
Home and away kits of Sportclub Plovdiv (1939–40)

In the years after Sportclub was created, the team competed in the local Championship of Plovdiv. In the early years of Bulgarian football, there was no national league. The local championships, held at a regional level, were the most prestigious football tournaments in the country. Sportclub participated in the second division until 1933, when the team finished first and was promoted to Plovdiv's top tier as of 1939. In 1940, Sportclub became the Champion of Plovdiv for the first time.

In 1939 the team joined the National Football Division – the countrywide football league which had been formed only a year earlier and which included Bulgaria's top ten teams. However, in 1940 the league was disbanded because of World War II. By that time the club had officially changed its name to Plovdivski Sportclub (Sportclub of Plovdiv), primarily because several other teams in the league also had Sportclub in their names.

During World War II, the team participated in several other tournaments including the Tsar's Cup, which was considered Bulgaria's most prestigious knock-out cup tournament at the time and a predecessor of the current domestic cup tournament. In the Tsar's Cup the team reached the finals twice – in 1940 and 1942.

By the time of communist rule in Bulgaria in 1944, Sportclub had become one of the best performing teams in the country, reaching the finals in many tournaments. The club had become the biggest in the Plovdiv region in terms of members and continually set attendance records for the period.

==== The Club of the Railway Workers in Plovdiv ====
In the mid-1930s, the railway workers' and sailors' labour union established numerous cultural and sporting organisations across the country. The railway workers established a sports club in Plovdiv as well, since the city is one of the major railway centres in the country. On 13 June 1935 the club ZSK Plovdiv was founded, abbreviated from Zheleznicharski Sporten Klub Plovdiv (The sporting club of the railway workers in Plovdiv).

For the first few years, ZSK Plovdiv lagged behind other teams in the city such as Sportclub and Botev Plovdiv. The team was not recognized as a full member of the national sport federation until three years after its creation. However, by the early 1940s they had improved and in 1944 they won the Championship of Plovdiv.

From an economic perspective, the railway club contributed heavily to the development of sports in the region, making large investments in the improvement of sporting facilities and conditions in the city. Most notably, the powerful national railway company, through ZSK Plovdiv, was the main benefactor for the creation of a state-of-the-art multi-purpose stadium that opened in 1943. The stadium was constructed on the football pitch of the existing team Levski Plovdiv and as such was the home ground for both ZSK Plovdiv and Levski Plovdiv. As a result, the stadium was named ZSK-Levski.

=== Creation of Lokomotiv Plovdiv (1944–1954) ===
==== Changes in Sportclub ====
In the years after 1944, the newly established communist rule embarked on several campaigns for the "reorganisation of the sporting clubs in Bulgaria" to make them align with the Soviet political agenda and follow the "Soviet model" of sport clubs. This meant that every local region should have its own sports club, but in order to make central investments more efficient for a larger member-base, only a few clubs were permitted per area. That led to the forced merger of clubs within the same locality.

Starting in 1944 Sportclub was merged with numerous other teams in the same district of Plovdiv. Being from an area with a diverse ethnic and religious population, the club was first merged with several lower-division so-called Armenian teams, such as Shant and Erevan. Another merger followed in 1945 with the Catholic club Parchevich. After this wave of mergers, like many other clubs in the country, the club was renamed to an abbreviation of the biggest clubs – S.P.-45, meaning Sportclub Parchevich – 1945. However, due to the non-Slavic background of the words "sport" and "club", the team was officially renamed again before the start of the season to Slavia Plovdiv.

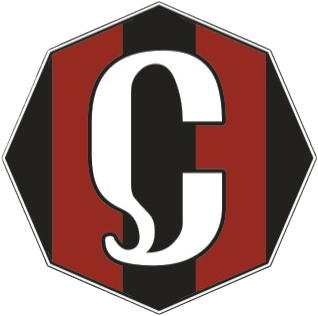
The crest of Slavia Plovdiv

In 1947 a new wave of consolidations saw Slavia Plovdiv merged with the cooperative workers' union team, Petar Chengelov. This merger created a club known as Slavia-Chengelov.

During 1944–1955, the club reached the domestic knock-out cup finals (at the time the Cup of the Soviet Army) for the third time in its history – in 1948 as Slavia-Chengelov.

In the 1948 season the club became one of the ten founding teams of the new national top league – "A" Republican Football Group (A RFG), the predecessor of the current Bulgarian top division league.

Through the mergers, the club originally named Sportclub kept its original colours and core team, with only a small number of players considered good enough to find a place in the first team of the "new" club. The supporters remained loyal to the colours and the players, and the followers of the assimilated clubs joined them, increasing the number of fans and members of the largest club in Plovdiv at that time. Though technically the numerous clubs merged, because of the sheer size of Sportclub in terms of members, the smaller clubs were effectively assimilated into the larger club.

==== Changes in ZSK ====
For ZSK Plovdiv, reorganisation began in the autumn of 1944. The club was initially merged with the team with which it shared a stadium, Levski Plovdiv, to form ZSK-Levski. However, unlike most other forced mergers at that time, the ZSK-Levski merger was dissolved in less than a year.

After the separation in 1945, ZSK was renamed to Lokomotiv Plovdiv similar to other teams in various Eastern bloc countries which were connected with the railways. Lokomotiv Plovdiv and Levski continued to co-exist as separate entities, still sharing the same stadium.

Although railway workers' club was financially backed by the national railway, in the early years of communist rule the football team competed only at the third level of the recently formed national league. Furthermore, the club was the smallest in Plovdiv in terms of members and attracted only a modest number of spectators for its games, despite its large, state-of-the-art stadium.

==== Merger of Slavia-Chengelov and Lokomotiv Plovdiv ====
In the summer of 1949, the Bulgarian Communist Party adopted a new principle governing the construction of sports clubs. Clubs had to serve primarily as physical fitness departments of politically important national enterprises, such as oil refineries, police, army, national railway, and others. Thus, the geographical location of a club was no longer important and clubs were assigned to the major institutions in the country.

The reorganisation of 1949 assigned Lokomotiv to assimilate Slavia-Chengelov, since Lokomotiv was already a team strongly associated with a significant national enterprise. By that time, Slavia-Chengelov was the largest club in Bulgaria in terms of members, and with an even larger fan base.

DSO Energiya was formed from this merger prior to the start of the 1950 season. They used Slavia-Chengelov's colours (white, red, and black) for both their kits and crest and the team itself retained only four players from Lokomotiv, with the core of the squad being players from Slavia-Chengelov. More than two decades after the 1928 earthquake, the fans of what was once Sportclub again had a home ground – the stadium of Lokomotiv. Changes in the formal names of clubs in the Soviet Union took place and a popular name for Eastern bloc sports clubs at the time, Torpedo, was adopted and the team was thus renamed Torpedo Plovdiv.

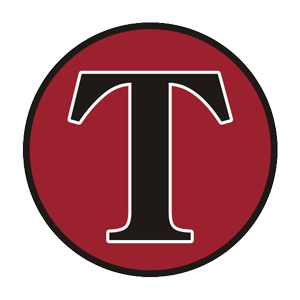
The crest of Torpedo Plovdiv

For the 1950 season, Torpedo Plovdiv took the place of Slavia-Chengelov at the top level of the Bulgarian football league system (A RFG). National policy then required that, as part of the railway union, all club members and players had to be members of the union. This included former members of Slavia-Chengelov, who had no connection to the railways.

Before the 1951 season began, the railway union established a new club, DSO Lokomotiv (Plovdiv), which shared Torpedo's colours and stadium. Torpedo's players were transferred to DSO Lokomotiv, and in order to make them official union members each player was nominally employed by the national railways. Meanwhile, Torpedo Plovdiv was removed from the labour union and no longer funded by it or the railway company. DSO Lokomotiv also acquired Torpedo's license to play in the top tier of the Bulgarian football league, while Torpedo was relegated to the third division. The labour union thus effectively legitimised the new club without needing to limit the access of the members of Torpedo to the sports facilities. Existing members of Torpedo could still use the shared facilities and were no longer required to be members of the railway union.

As of 1951 the fans of Torpedo Plovdiv from 1950 now found themselves supporting the same players, with the same colours, in the same stadium, under a new name. As official membership in the club now required a job with the railways, the official number of members was drastically smaller than in previous years. Nevertheless, the supporters of the team remained the same. Hence, in 1951 DSO Lokomotiv effectively became the successor to Torpedo while Torpedo still competed at a lower level.

From 1951 to 1954 DSO Lokomotiv was one of the best performers in the Bulgarian football elite, annually reaching at least the quarter-final phase of the domestic cup competition (at that time the Cup of the Soviet Army) and regularly finishing high in the top division league.

=== First relegation from the elite (1955–1960) ===
In 1955 DSO Lokomotiv's playing squad changed entirely – many aging key players were transferred to other teams, but their replacements seemed to be unable to collaborate and were not of the same quality. At the end of the 1955 season DSO Lokomotiv were relegated to the second division.

DSO Lokomotiv played in the second division for five seasons until it returned to the elite level for season 1961–62. In the same year, the team reached the domestic cup finals for the fourth time (after 1940 and 1942 as Sportclub, and 1948 as Slavia-Chengelov), but again lost.

In 1957 another sport reorganisation occurred and clubs were no longer required to be affiliated with national enterprises; instead, teams returned to geographical regions. Thus, sport clubs no longer needed to be "DSO" (English: "voluntary sports organisation"). Consequently, DSO Lokomotiv assimilated Torpedo Plovdiv and Septemvri (Plovdiv), changing its name to Lokomotiv Plovdiv, which it has retained to this day.

=== Success home and abroad (1961–1984) ===
After rejoining the elite (A RFG) in 1961, it took Lokomotiv seven years to reach the top three and get a medal in the 1968–69 season.

Internationally, the team achieved success more quickly. In the 1964–65 season, Lokomotiv Plovdiv reached the third round of the Inter-Cities Fairs Cup, where after two draws with the Italian team Juventus, a third play-off match was chosen by UEFA to be played in Turin. The game ended with a narrow loss by Lokomotiv with a score of 2–1.

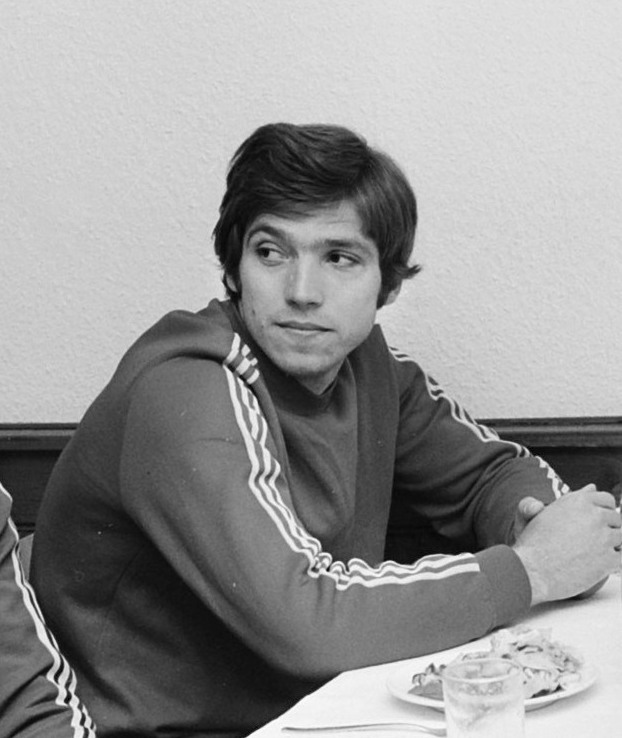
The No.8 shirt is retired in honour of Hristo Bonev

Before reaching the third round, Lokomotiv had previously eliminated the Serbian FK Vojvodina and the Romanian FC Petrolul Ploieşti. Key players during this period include forward Gocho Vasilev, star midfielder Hristo Bonev, defender Ivan Boyadzhiev and goalkeeper Stancho Bonchev.

In 1971, the team reached the domestic cup finals but again lost, this time to Levski Sofia with a score of 3–0.

In 1973, Lokomotiv won the A RFG silver medals, finishing the season with 43 points. In 1974, Lokomotiv finished the season in third place receiving the league bronze. The team was quite stable over the next few years and rarely under 6th place in the league table. Among the team's players was Hristo Bonev – considered by most Lokomotiv fans as the greatest player and one of the greatest Bulgarian-born players.

In the 1979–80 season Lokomotiv Plovdiv was again relegated to Bulgaria's second football division, but took three seasons to earn back its place.

While being in second division between 1981 and 1983, the team reached the finals in the Cup of the Soviet Army twice. On 12 June 1982 the team lost the domestic cup final for the sixth time.

In 1982 the team acquired Lokomotiv Stadium, situated in Lauta Park near the city's newest district. It is part of a multi-sports complex also used by the club's other sports teams (such as volleyball, tennis and boxing). The inauguration event was scheduled for Monday 6 September 1982 with a match against Neftochimic Burgas (Lokomotiv prevailed 4–1).

==== 1982–83 Cup of the Soviet Army Winners ====
On 1 June 1983, led by Hristo Bonev, Lokomotiv won their first national cup by beating FC Chirpan 3–1 at Vasil Levski National Stadium in Sofia. The Cup of the Soviet Army, held annually between 1946 and 1990, was recognised by the Bulgarian Football Union (BFU) as the primary domestic knock-out cup tournament until 1982. In 1981, the Bulgarian Cup began to be held every year and overtook the significance of the Cup of the Soviet Army. BFU's current official policy considers the Bulgarian Cup to be the primary domestic knock-out cup from 1983 onwards. Thus Lokomotiv Plovdiv is not officially recognised as the bearer of the domestic cup for 1983.

In the 1983–84 season, the team was again relegated to second level and played the 1984–85 season at that level. In 1985 it rejoined A RFG.

=== 1985–2000 ===
After its return to the top division in 1985 the team had a consistent performance for over a decade, placing itself in the middle of the league table until the late 1990s. During that time the team finished in the top three once, in the 1991–92 season. In the 1998–99 and 1999–00 seasons Lokomotiv Plovdiv played in B PFG.

=== Georgi Iliev era (2001–2004) ===
In 2001 the club was purchased by Georgi Iliev, who at the time owned another football club, Velbazhd Kyustendil. It finished in third place in the top division for three consecutive seasons until 2000-01 and was national cup runner-up in 2001.

During the 2001–02 season, Iliev merged the two teams creating the contemporary Lokomotiv Plovdiv (Professional Football Club Lokomotiv 1926 Plovdiv). The new club is the official successor of the Lokomotiv club that merged with Velbazhd and uses the same colours. The team was formed almost entirely from the high-ranking players from Velbazhd Kyustendil's later years. The team finished third at the end of the season.

==== 2003–04 Champions and Supercup Winners ====

Players with most apps in 2003–04 season

The most successful season in the club's history was the 2003–04 campaign. Lokomotiv won the title, the only one in the club's history so far. Coach and former legendary player Eduard Eranosyan started well, with Lokomotiv leading the league by six points halfway through the season and remaining unbeaten. In the penultimate 29th round, the team defeated Slavia Sofia in Plovdiv by 3–2 in front of more than 17,000 spectators and won the Bulgarian championship. Lokomotiv finished the season with 75 points, 3 more than the second team, Levski Sofia. In the team lines was recent acquisition Martin Kamburov who became the top goalscorer of the league with 25 goals. Key players during the season included Vasil Kamburov, Georgi Iliev, Aleksandar Tunchev, Kiril Kotev, Vladimir Ivanov, Metodi Stoynev and Macedonians Boban Jančevski, Vančo Trajanov and Robert Petrov.

On 31 July 2004, Lokomotiv won the Bulgarian Supercup, after beating Litex Lovech at Lazur Stadium. The captain Ivan Paskov scored a brilliant header in the last seconds of the game for the 1–0 win.

A few months later, the team played for the first time in the UEFA Champions League qualifying rounds where they faced Club Brugge from Belgium in the second qualifying round.

=== 2005–2015 ===
In 2004–05 the team finished third in the A PFG and qualified for the UEFA Cup. In the European club competition, Lokomotiv defeated Serbian OFK Beograd in the second qualifying round (1:0 home win and 1:2 away loss) and were drawn to play against the English Bolton Wanderers in the first round. However, the team from Plovdiv was eliminated after a 1–2 loss at the Reebok Stadium in Bolton and another 1–2 loss in a match played at the Lazur Stadium in Burgas.

In the next few months the club had significant financial problems causing many of the champions' team players such as Aleksandar Tunchev, Martin Kamburov, Ivan Paskov, Georgi Iliev, Darko Spalević, Kiril Kotev and Boban Jančevski to leave.

In the 2005-06 season Lokomotiv finished 5th in A PFG and qualified for the Intertoto Cup. They were eliminated with a 2-3 (1–2 away loss and a 1–1 home draw) on aggregate by Romanian Farul Constanţa.

In the next three seasons, the team finished in the middle of the table. In December 2009, businessman and ex-Vihren Sandanski owner Konstantin Dinev acquired the club from Galina Topalova in a 2 million euro bid, with the intention to bring them back to European club competition.

=== Hristo Krusharski era (2016–present) ===
==== 2018–19 Bulgarian Cup Winners ====

Lokomotiv lineup in the Bulgarian Cup Final 2018–19

On 15 May 2019, Lokomotiv Plovdiv won the Bulgarian Cup for the first time in the club's history, defeating local rivals Botev Plovdiv 1–0 in Sofia. The winning goal came in the 72nd minute with a back heel kick of Alen Ožbolt. Ante Aralica provided the assist.

Winning the Bulgarian Cup enabled the team to play in the Europa League second qualifying round for the 2019–20 season. In the second round, Lokomotiv faced FC Spartak Trnava of Slovakia. Lokomotiv won the tie on aggregate, with a score of 3–3, progressing to the next round via the away goals rule. The next round's opponent was Strasbourg. Lokomotiv entered as outsiders against the French side, and lost the first game 0–1 in Bulgaria. In the second match, Lokomotiv Plovdiv again lost with a minimum score of 1–0, being eliminated on aggregate 0–2.

==== 2019–20 Bulgarian Cup and Supercup Winners ====

Lokomotiv lineup in the Bulgarian Cup Final 2019–20

On 1 July 2020, Lokomotiv beat CSKA Sofia on the final match played in Sofia and clinched the Bulgarian Cup for a second consecutive time, becoming the first team winning two consecutive cups after Litex Lovech in 2008 and 2009. The Smurfs defeated CSKA Sofia after a penalty shootout (5–3).

On 2 August 2020, Lokomotiv won the Bulgarian Supercup for the second time, defeating Ludogorets 0–1 at Ludogorets Arena (Ludogorets home ground). The winning goal was scored in the last minute of the regular time with a volley kick of the captain Dimitar Iliev.

Lokomotiv beat Iskra Danilovgrad of Montenegro 1–0 in the first Europa League qualifying round on 27 August 2020. Due to the COVID-19 pandemic, all Europa League qualifying ties this season before the play-off round featured only one leg. In the second qualifying round Lokomotiv faced José Mourinho's Tottenham Hotspur and it was close to eliminate the English team after the goal of Georgi Minchev, but Spurs complete late turnaround after two red cards for Lokomotiv players.

Lokomotiv finished on 2nd place in the regular season and qualified for the Championship Round maintaining their status in the top three until the last round of the season.

The Smurfs started the 2020/21 season with a match against Slovácko in a second qualifying round of the Europa Conference League. Lokomotiv won the first match at Lokomotiv Stadium 1–0 with a 90th-minute winner of Petar Vitanov and loss with the same scoreline in Uherské Hradiště. In the penalty shoot-out Ilko Pirgov parried 3 consecutive penalties and Lokomotiv won 3–2. In the third qualifying round Lokomotiv were eliminated by Copenhagen of Danmark, following a 1–1 draw in Plovdiv and a 4–2 loss in the return leg at Parken Stadium.

In the league, Lokomotiv won the silver medals for the second time in club's history, finishing the season with 61 points.

== Crest and colors ==
The configuration of the crest consists of a shield colored in red and black and a golden letter 'L' (Bulgarian: Л) placed in the center. A white stripe with the inscription 'Plovdiv' is positioned on the upper part of the shield. The wings at the bottom of the shield represent the historical bond between the football club and the national railway company.

Lokomotiv Plovdiv's traditional home colors are white, black and red. In the past the club has also adopted sky blue as a kit color.

== Names ==
Lokomotiv was founded as Sportclub Plovdiv in 1926 and has carried a plethora of names throughout its history. In chronological order, they are as follows:

- Sportclub Plovdiv (Bulgarian: Пловдивски Спортклуб) in 1926.
- S.P. 45 (Sportclub Parchevich 1945) (Bulgarian: С.П. 45) in 1945.
- Slavia Plovdiv (Bulgarian: Славия Пловдив) in 1946 and 1949.
- Slavia-Chengelov Plovdiv (Bulgarian: Славия-Ченгелов Пловдив) in 1947.
- Energia Plovdiv (Bulgarian: Енергия Пловдив) in 1949 (from 5 to 11 October).
- Torpedo Plovdiv (Bulgarian: Торпедо Пловдив) in 1949.
- Lokomotiv Plovdiv (Bulgarian: Локомотив Пловдив) since 1951.

== Stadium ==
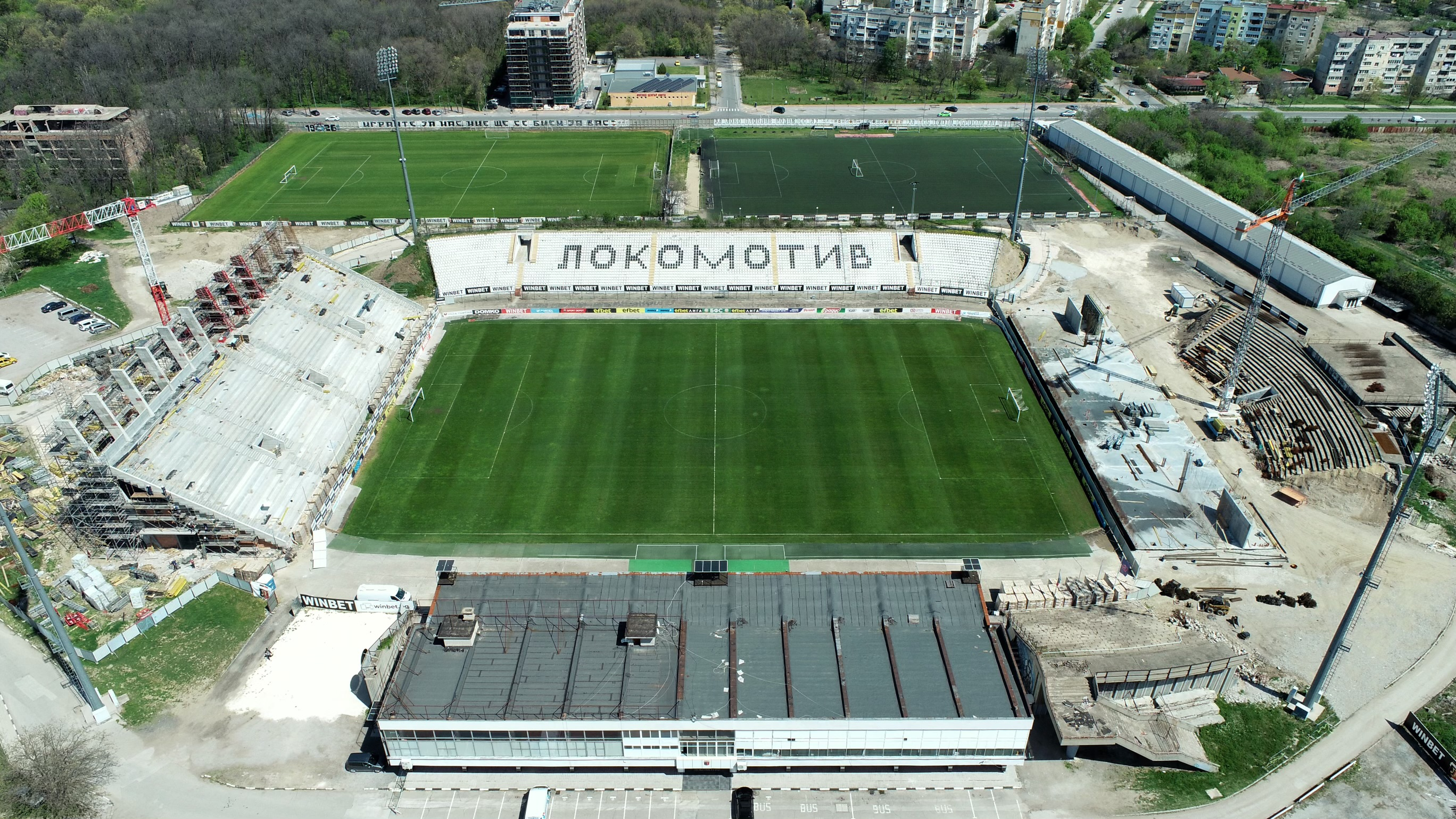
Hristo Bonev Stadium viewed from the air

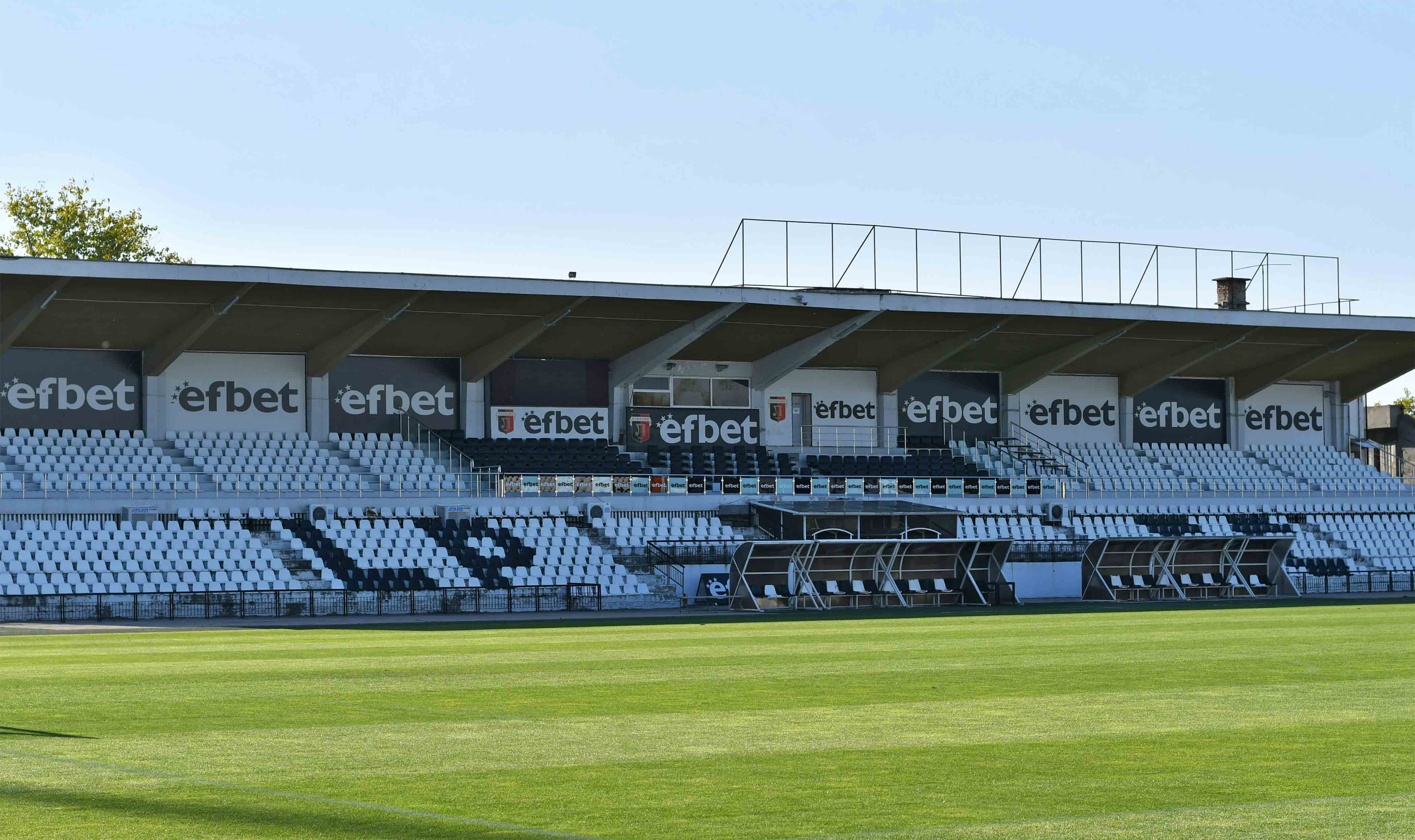
The Main stand

Hristo Bonev Stadium, nicknamed Lauta after the name of the park in which the stadium is situated, is a multi-purpose stadium located in southeastern Plovdiv, Bulgaria. Designed by architect Zdravko Vasilkov, the stadium was officially opened on Bulgarian Unification Day on 6 September 1982 and is a part of a sports complex, which includes an indoor athletic hall, a volleyball hall, five tennis courts and three training pitches. The main pitch length is 105 metres and the width is 71 metres.

The stadium initially held a capacity of 24,000 people. The record attendance was back in 1983 when Lokomotiv played against Chernomorets Burgas in a playoff game for entering the Country's top-tier league. There were 33,000 people attending this game and at least 6,000 of those were actually outside of the stadium.

On 25 July 2019, the stadium hosted its first ever European competition game, as Lokomotiv defeated Spartak Trnava 2–0 in a Europa League fixture in front of nearly 10,000 spectators. This date also matched with Lokomotiv's 93rd birthday and the win was a great gift for the thousands of people attending the game.

In 2020 after a government funding for the Plovdiv city football infrastructure the works on the new Bessica stand started with the completion date set for the summer of 2022. Also by the end of the same year the opposite south stand were demolished and preparation started for the foundations of the stand. Both the north and south stands are planned to host 2,846 spectators each and being completed by the end of 2022. After the Bessica and south stand are completed, the west stand called Sportclub is expected to be the next one to be demolished and build back up from the scratch. The total capacity for the stadium is planned to be 14,500 after the construction works are completed by the summer of 2026.

== Support ==
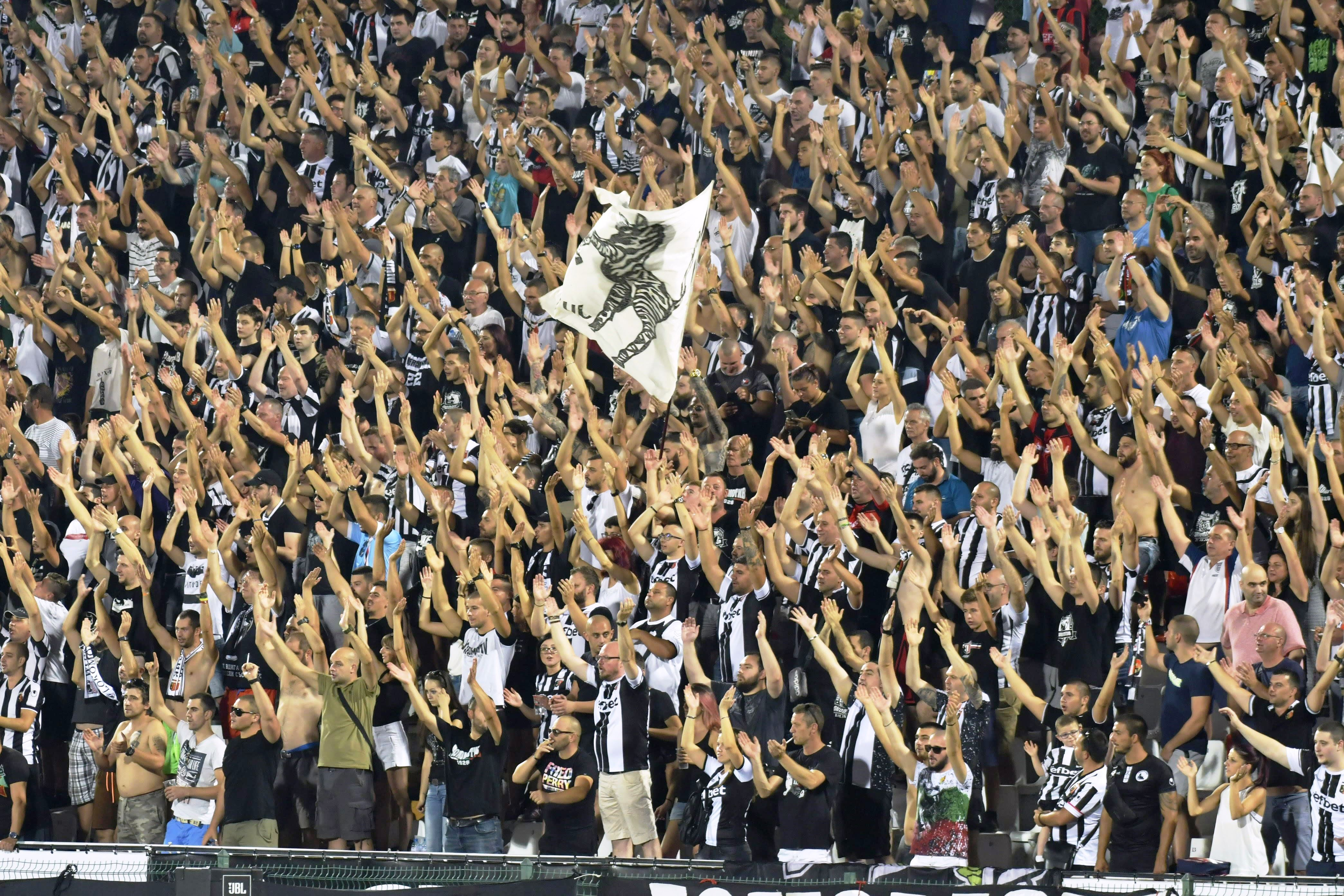
Lokomotiv Plovdiv fans provide their support with extreme passion

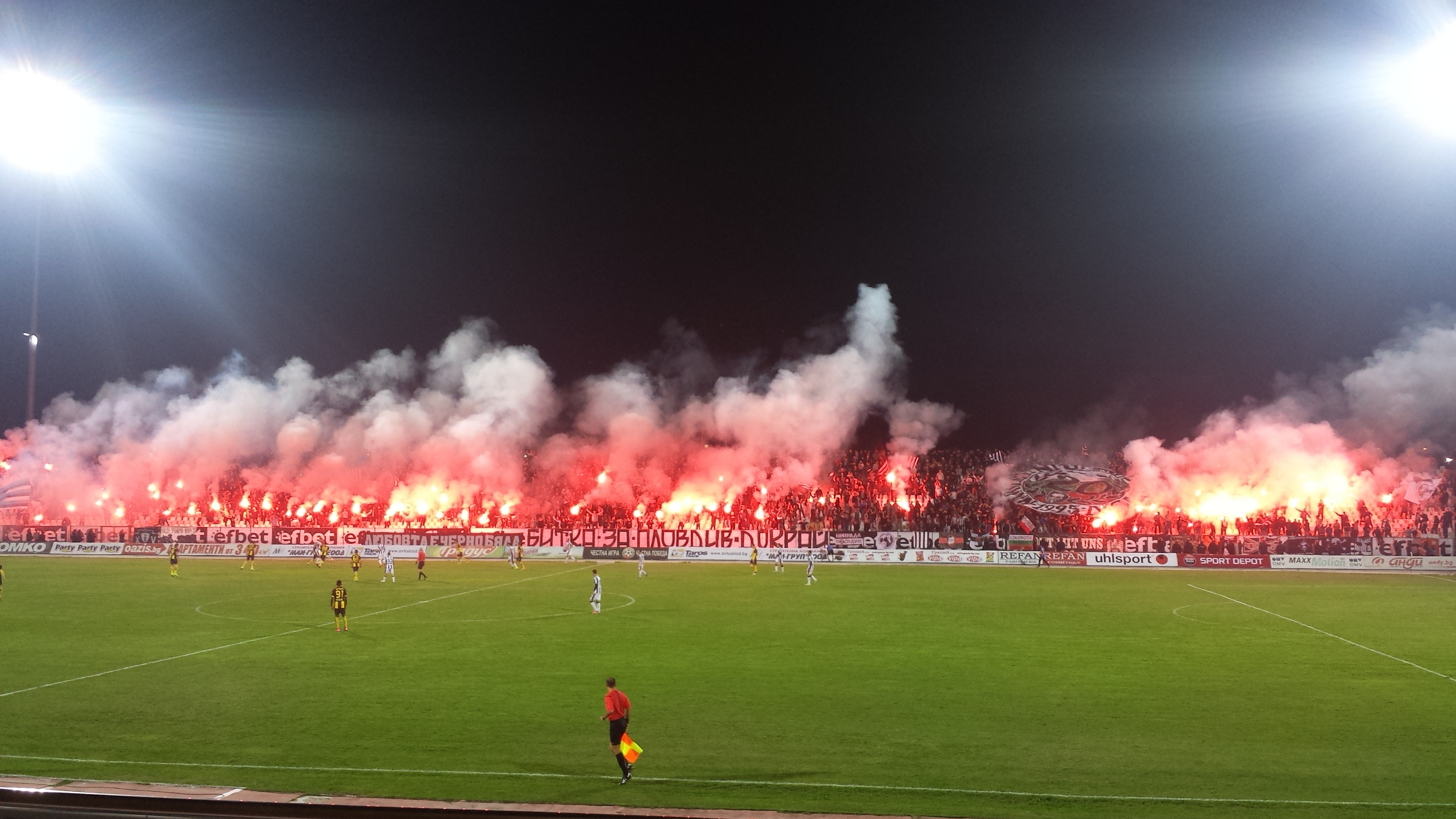
Lokomotiv Plovdiv supporters during the Plovdiv derby

Since its foundation, Lokomotiv has been one of the best supported football clubs in Bulgaria. Its fans broke attendance records on numerous occasions in the early years despite hardships (the team did not have a home ground for more than 20 years after the 1928 earthquake). By the 1940s the club was one of the largest in the country in terms of officially registered members. In 1968 its supporters established the amateur football club Friends of Lokomotiv Plovdiv as a means of organised support, and in 1988 the official fan club – Club of the Supporters of Lokomotiv Plovdiv – was established as the first of its kind in Bulgaria. The political environment of the time was unfavourable towards independently formed organisations.

In the 1980s the club was extremely popular and had the biggest away invasions, including more than 30,000 people at the final of the 1983 Soviet Cup. The club also holds record attendance for a championship home game – more than 40,000 people versus Beroe. When Lokomotiv won the title in 2003–04 there were 50,000 people in the city's main square to celebrate the victory.

At the start of the reconstruction of Lokomotiv Stadium, the section for the most devoted fans was to be called Bessica Tribune after the ancient Thracian tribe whose artefacts were discovered nearby. Since the project's postponement, the name has been used collectively for the most dedicated followers.

Lokomotiv Plovdiv also has a football hooligan fan base, with some of the most prominent factions being Lauta Hools, Got Mitt Uns, Napoletani 1995, and Lauta Youths. Lauta Hools, also called Usual suspects, founded in 1992, adhere to the British form of support and are casuals, and it is not uncommon to see the Union Jack in the stands as a result.

=== Friendships ===
Lokomotiv fans have a long-standing friendship with fans of the Italian team SSC Napoli due to their creation of the name Napoletani Ultras Plovdiv. On many occasions, fans from both clubs traveled to watch each other's games.

=== Rivalries ===
Lokomotiv's main rival is the neighbouring city club of Botev Plovdiv, and both form the Plovdiv derby. The Plovdiv derby is considered to be the second fiercest rivalry in Bulgarian football, after the Eternal derby of Bulgarian football. The rivalry poses a symbolic importance to supporters due to an assumed superiority that comes with winning the derby.

Another rivalry is with CSKA Sofia and is the fiercest intercity football rivalry in Bulgaria, because of the historical competition between the cities of Plovdiv and Sofia as cultural, political and economical centres.

== Players ==
=== First-team squad ===
As of 31 August 2026

Note: Flags indicate national team as defined under FIFA eligibility rules; some limited exceptions apply. Players may hold more than one non-FIFA nationality.

No.	Pos.	Nation	Player
1	GK	SUI	Bojan Milosavljević (vice-captain)
2	DF	VEN	Adrián Cova
3	DF	FRA	Dalil Ali
4	DF	ROU	Andrei Chindriș
5	DF	BUL	Todor Pavlov
6	MF	SLO	Miha Trdan
7	MF	BUL	Sevi Idriz
9	FW	BUL	Aksel Velev
10	MF	BUL	Yulian Iliev (on loan from CSKA Sofia)
11	MF	NED	Ryan Leijten
12	MF	BUL	Efe Ali
13	DF	BRA	Lucas Ryan
17	FW	NED	Anton Fase

No.	Pos.	Nation	Player
19	FW	FRA	Junior Burban
21	DF	ARG	Enzo Espinoza
22	MF	BUL	Ivaylo Ivanov
23	DF	BUL	Martin Ruskov
26	DF	BUL	Denis Kirashki
29	FW	CIV	Chris Longville
30	MF	BUL	Aleksandar Aleksandrov
39	MF	TJK	Parvizdzhon Umarbayev (captain)
40	GK	BIH	Petar Zovko
44	DF	GER	Milan Petrović
94	DF	BRA	Matheus Brito
99	FW	FRA	Julien Lamy

For recent transfers, see List of Bulgarian football transfers summer 2026.

==== Out on loan ====
Note: Flags indicate national team as defined under FIFA eligibility rules; some limited exceptions apply. Players may hold more than one non-FIFA nationality.

No.	Pos.	Nation	Player
—	MF	BUL	Martin Atanasov (at Rilski Sportist until 31 December 2026)
—	FW	BUL	Zapro Dinev (at Beroe until 30 June 2027)

No.	Pos.	Nation	Player
—	FW	BUL	Mariyan Vangelov (at Hebar until 30 June 2027)

=== Foreign players ===
Up to twenty foreign nationals can be registered and given a squad number for the first team in the Bulgarian First League, however only five non-EU nationals can be used during a match day. Those non-EU nationals with European ancestry can claim citizenship from the nation their ancestors came from. If a player does not have European ancestry he can claim Bulgarian citizenship after playing in Bulgaria for 5 years.

EU Nationals

- (France) Junior Burban
- (Romania) Andrei Chindriș
- (Slovenia) Miha Trdan

EU Nationals (Dual citizenship)

- (Argentina) (Italy) Enzo Espinoza
- (France) (Algeria) Dalil Ali
- (France) (Cameroon) Julien Lamy
- (Germany) (Serbia) Milan Petrović
- (Netherlands) (China) Ryan Leijten
- (Netherlands) (Suriname) Anton Fase
- (Switzerland) (Serbia) Bojan Milosavljević
- (Venezuela) (Spain) Adrián Cova

Non-EU Nationals

- (Bosnia and Herzegovina) Petar Zovko
- (Brazil) Lucas Ryan
- (Brazil) Matheus Brito
- (Ivory Coast) Christ Longville
- (Tajikistan) (Russia) Parvizdzhon Umarbayev

=== Retired numbers ===
No.	Player	Nationality	Position	Lokomotiv debut	Last match	Ref
8	Hristo Bonev	Bulgaria	Attacking midfielder	5 June 1965	15 October 1983	

=== Player of the Season ===
Year	Winner
2006	(Bulgaria) Stoyan Kolev
2007	(Brazil) Dakson
2008	(Bulgaria) Yordan Miliev
2009	(Bulgaria) Kiril Akalski
2010	(Bulgaria) Zdravko Lazarov
2011	(Bulgaria) Zdravko Lazarov
2012	(Bulgaria) Hristo Zlatinski
2013	(Bulgaria) Martin Kamburov
2014	(Bulgaria) Martin Kamburov
2015	(Bulgaria) Martin Kamburov

Year	Winner
2016	(Bulgaria) Martin Kamburov
2017	(Bulgaria) Martin Kamburov
2018	(Bulgaria) Dimitar Iliev
2019	(Bulgaria) Dimitar Iliev
2020	(Bulgaria) Dimitar Iliev
2021	(Bulgaria) Dimitar Iliev
2022	(Bulgaria) Birsent Karagaren
2023	(Croatia) Dinko Horkaš
2024	(Bulgaria) Angel Lyaskov

== Honours ==
=== Domestic ===
- First League
  - Winners (1): 2003–04
- Bulgarian Cup
  - Winners (2): 2018–19, 2019–20
- Bulgarian Supercup
  - Winners (2): 2004, 2020
- Cup of the Soviet Army
  - Winners (1): 1983

=== Regional ===
- Plovdiv Championship
  - Winners (11) (record): 1936, 1938, 1942, 1945, 1946, 1948 (as Sportclub), 1933, 1935, 1939, 1941 (as Parchevich), 1944 (as ZSK Plovdiv)
- Trimontium Cup
  - Winners (5) (record): 1938, 1946 (as Sportclub), 1934, 1939, 1941 (as Parchevich)

Source: lokomotivpd.com

=== European ===
- European Railways Cup
  - Runners-up (1): 1987

== European record ==
As of 13 July 2022

Competition	Played	Won	Drew	Lost	GF	GA	GD	Win%
UEFA Champions League	2	0	0	2	0	6	−6	0.00
UEFA Cup / UEFA Europa League	46	13	8	25	57	89	−32	28.26
UEFA Europa Conference League	4	1	1	2	4	6	−2	25.00
UEFA Intertoto Cup	2	0	1	1	2	3	−1	0.00
Total	54	14	10	30	63	104	−41	25.93

=== Matches ===
As of 13 July 2022

Season	Competition	Round	Club	Home	Away	Aggregate
1963–64	Fairs Cup	1Q	(Romania) Steagul Roșu Brașov	3–1	2–1	5–2
1963–64	Fairs Cup	2Q	(Hungary) Újpest	1–3	0–0	1–3
1964–65	Fairs Cup	1Q	(Socialist Federal Republic of Yugoslavia) Vojvodina	1–1	1–1	2–0 (Playoff)
1964–65	Fairs Cup	2Q	(Romania) Petrolul Ploiești	2–0	0–1	2–1
1964–65	Fairs Cup	3Q	(Italy) Juventus	1–1	1–1	1–2 (Playoff)
1965–66	Fairs Cup	1Q	(Czechoslovakia) Spartak Brno	1–0	0–2	1–2
1967–68	Fairs Cup	1Q	(Socialist Federal Republic of Yugoslavia) Partizan	1–1	1–5	2–6
1969–70	Fairs Cup	1Q	(Italy) Juventus	1–2	1–3	2–5
1971–72	UEFA Cup	1Q	(East Germany) Carl Zeiss	3–1	0–3	3–4
1973–74	UEFA Cup	1Q	(Malta) Sliema Wanderers	1–0	2–0	3–0
1973–74	UEFA Cup	2Q	(Hungary) Honved Budapest	3–4	2–3	5–7
1974–75	UEFA Cup	1Q	(Hungary) Győri ETO	3–1	1–3	4–4 (p)
1976–77	UEFA Cup	1Q	(Socialist Federal Republic of Yugoslavia) Crvena Zvezda	2–1	1–4	3–5
1983–84	UEFA Cup	1Q	(Greece) PAOK	1–2	1–3	2–5
1992–93	UEFA Cup	1Q	(France) Auxerre	2–2	1–7	3–9
1993–94	UEFA Cup	1Q	(Italy) Lazio	0–2	0–2	0–4
2004–05	UEFA Champions League	2Q	(Belgium) Club Brugge	0–4	0–2	0–6
2005–06	UEFA Cup	2Q	(Serbia and Montenegro) OFK Beograd	1–0	1–2	2–2 (a)
2005–06	UEFA Cup	PO	(England) Bolton	1–2	1–2	2–4
2006	UEFA Intertoto Cup	2Q	(Romania) Farul Constanța	1–1	1–2	2–3
2012–13	UEFA Europa League	2Q	(Netherlands) Vitesse	4–4	1–3	5–7
2019–20	UEFA Europa League	2Q	(Slovakia) Spartak Trnava	2–0	1–3	3–3 (a)
2019–20	UEFA Europa League	3Q	(France) Strasbourg	0–1	0–1	0–2
2020–21	UEFA Europa League	1Q	(Montenegro) Iskra	—N/a	1–0	1–0
2020–21	UEFA Europa League	2Q	(England) Tottenham Hotspur	1–2	—N/a	1–2
2021–22	UEFA Europa Conference League	2Q	(Czech Republic) Slovácko	1–0	0–1	1–1 (3–2 p)
2021–22	UEFA Europa Conference League	3Q	(Denmark) Copenhagen	1–1	2–4	3–5

Notes

- 1Q: First qualifying round
- 2Q: Second qualifying round
- 3Q: Third qualifying round
- PO: Play-off round

=== UEFA club rankings ===
As of 20 July 2022

Current ranking

Rank	Team	Coeff.
225	(Slovenia) Mura	5.500
226	(Turkey) Trabzonspor	5.500
227	(Bulgaria) Lokomotiv Plovdiv	5.500
228	(Malta) Hibernians	5.500
229	(Iceland) FH Hafnarfjördur	5.500

== Recent seasons ==
=== League positions ===
Season	Tier	Position	M	W	D	L	G	D	P	Bulgarian Cup	Bulgarian Supercup	Top goalscorer
2014–15	A Group	10	32	9	5	18	28	-24	32	Semi-finals		Martin Kamburov /13 goals/
2015–16	A Group	5	32	15	4	14	40	-5	49	Round of 16		Martin Kamburov /18 goals/
2016–17	First League	5	36	14	10	12	50	-2	52	Quarter-finals		Martin Kamburov /17 goals/
2017–18	First League	8	36	11	11	14	35	-13	44	Round of 16		Dimo Bakalov /9 goals/
2018–19	First League	10	34	10	8	16	37	-3	38	Winners	Runners-Up	Dimitar Iliev /9 goals/
2019–20	First League	5	31	15	8	8	53	+18	53	Winners	Winners	Dimitar Iliev /12 goals/
2020–21	First League	2	31	17	10	4	48	+25	61	Quarter-finals		Dimitar Iliev /13 goals/
2021–22	First League	9	32	9	11	12	36	-7	38	Quarter-finals		Dimitar Iliev /13 goals/
2022–23	First League	5	35	15	9	11	35	+1	54	Round of 16		Giovanny /8 goals/
2023–24	First League	5	35	17	7	11	53	+9	58	Round of 16		Giovanny /7 goals/

== Records ==
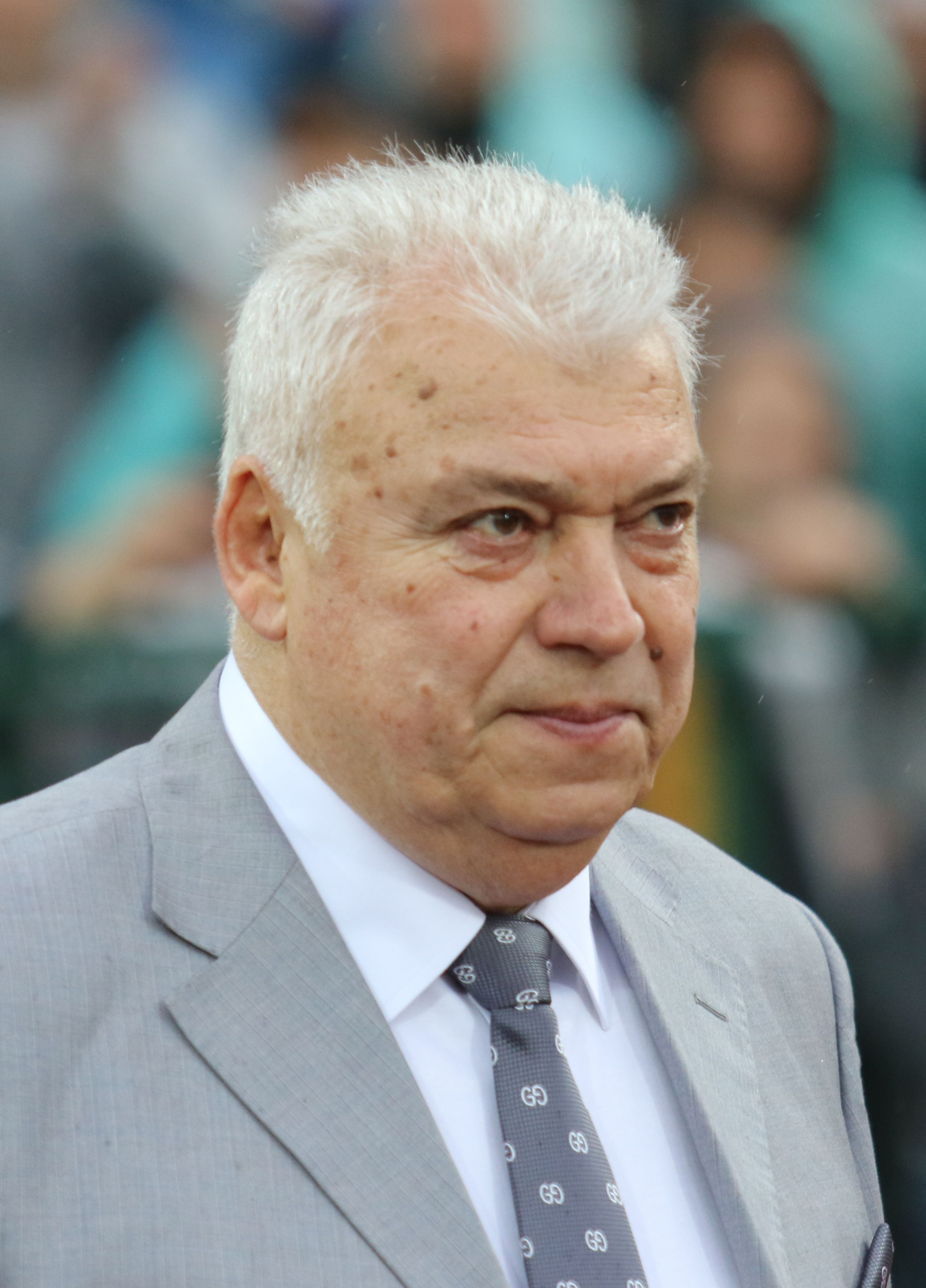
Legendary Hristo Bonev, a powerful attacking midfielder, is the appearances recordman and all-time goalscorer of the club.

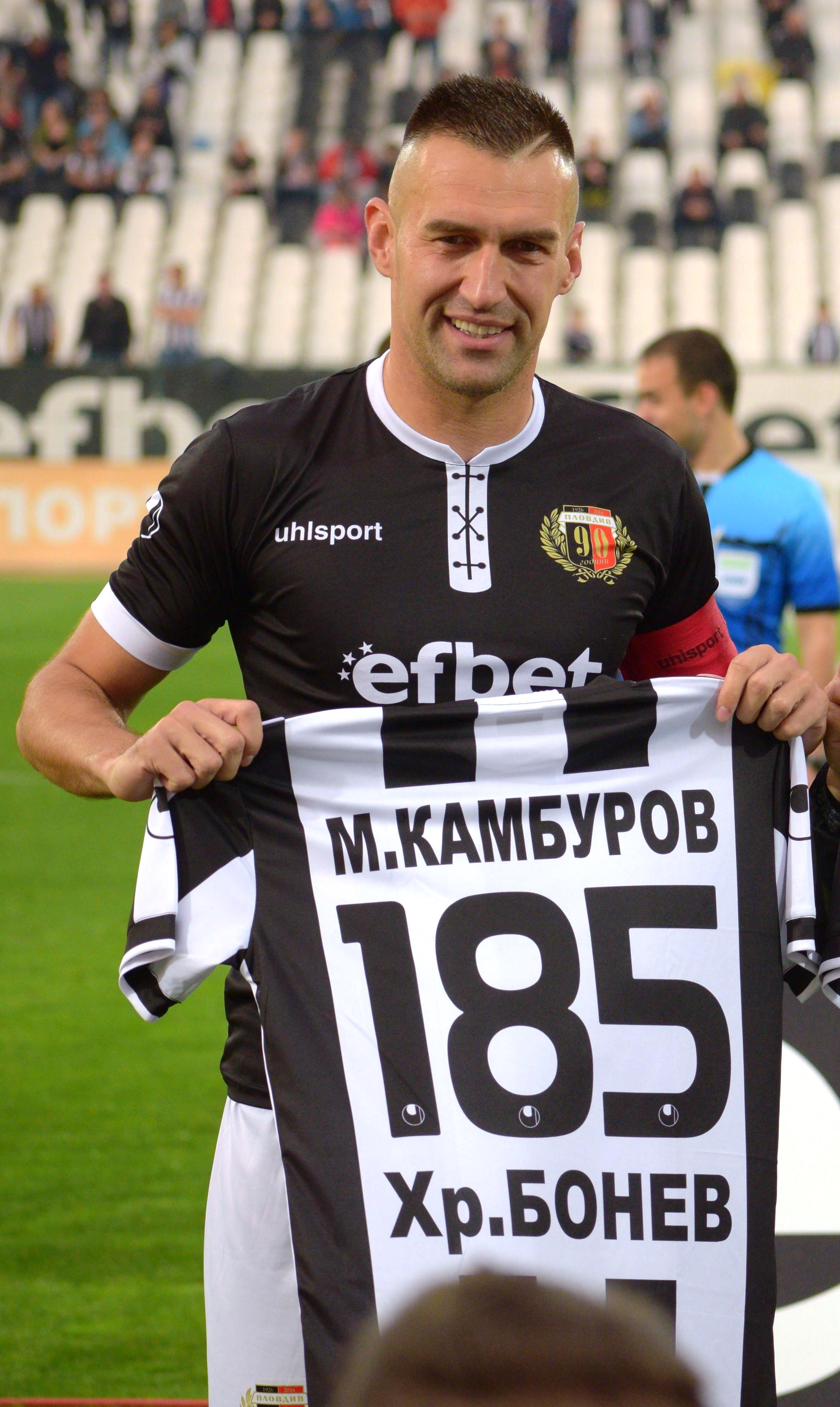
Martin Kamburov is 4-time top scorer of the First league with Lokomotiv Plovdiv.

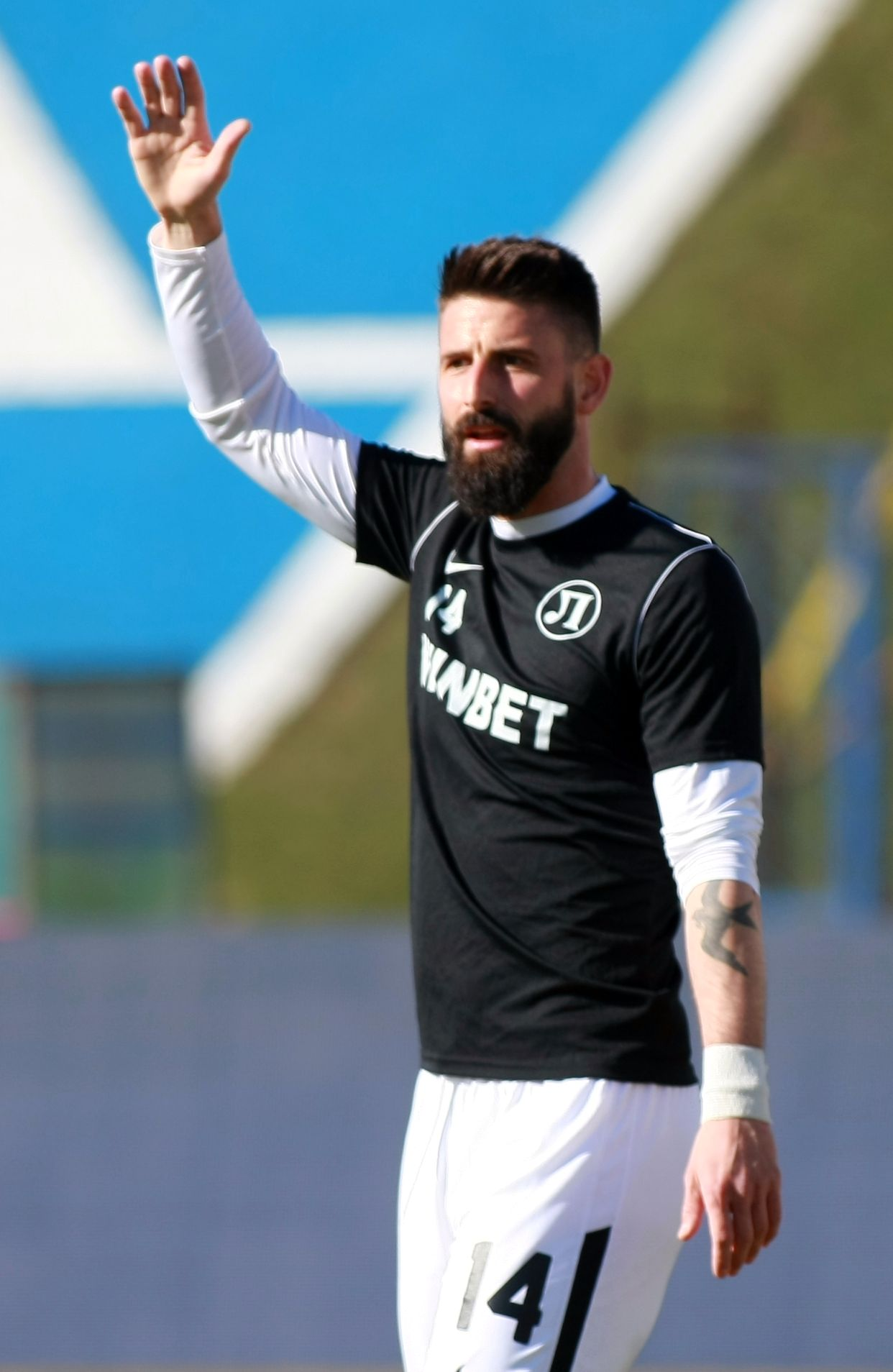
Dimitar Iliev won the award for Bulgarian Footballer of the Year in 2019 and 2020. He is the captain and the leader of the club in the recent seasons.

=== Player records ===
Hristo Bonev holds the records for most Lokomotiv Plovdiv first league appearances (404) and goals (180).

As of 23 September 2026

**Most league appearances for the club**

Rank	Name	Career	Appearances
1	(Bulgaria) Hristo Bonev	1964–1967; 1968–1981; 1982–1984	426 (404)
2	(Bulgaria) Georgi Vasilev	1963–1979	386 (386)
3	(Bulgaria) Ayan Sadakov	1978–1989; 1992–1993	350 (228)
4	(Bulgaria) Iliya Bekyarov	1959–1973	344 (314)
5	(Bulgaria) Gancho Peev	1966–1981	340 (327)
6	(Bulgaria) Stancho Bonchev	1962–1967; 1969–1980	311 (311)
7	(Bulgaria) Dimitar Iliev	2004–2009; 2018–2026	305 (305)
—	(Bulgaria) Eduard Eranosyan	1977–1988; 1993–1995	305 (168)
9	(Bulgaria) Nedyalko Stamboliev	1968–1980	293 (293)
10	(Bulgaria) Hristo Sotirov	1978–1987	257 (127)

**Most league goals for the club**

Rank	Name	Career	Goals
1	(Bulgaria) Ayan Sadakov	1978–1989; 1992–1993	195 (66)
2	(Bulgaria) Hristo Bonev	1964–1967; 1968–1981; 1982–1984	185 (180)
3	(Bulgaria) Martin Kamburov	2000; 2002–2007; 2013–2017	145 (145)
4	(Bulgaria) Eduard Eranosyan	1977–1988; 1993–1995	140 (64)
5	(Bulgaria) Georgi Vasilev	1963–1979	115 (115)
6	(Bulgaria) Dimitar Iliev	2004–2009; 2018–present	79 (79)
7	(Bulgaria) Stefan Draganov	1983–1991; 1995–1996	56 (54)
8	(Bulgaria) Hristo Sotirov	1978–1987	53 (22)
—	(Bulgaria) Georgi Dimitrov	1983–1991; 1993–2000	53 (46)
10	(Bulgaria) Hristo Kolev	1983–1988; 1997–1998	52 (40)

- Players in **bold** are still playing for Lokomotiv.
- Stats in ( ) are marking First League apps or goals.

Bulgarian league top scorers

Season	Name	Goals
1983/84	(Bulgaria) Eduard Eranosyan	19
2003/04	(Bulgaria) Martin Kamburov	25
2004/05	(Bulgaria) Martin Kamburov	27
2013/14	(Bulgaria) Martin Kamburov	20
2015/16	(Bulgaria) Martin Kamburov	18

Bulgarian Footballer of the Year

Year	Name
1969	(Bulgaria) Hristo Bonev
1972	(Bulgaria) Hristo Bonev
1973	(Bulgaria) Hristo Bonev
2019	(Bulgaria) Dimitar Iliev
2020	(Bulgaria) Dimitar Iliev

=== Club records ===
- Biggest league win: 9–1 vs Dobrudzha Dobrich (21 September 2002) — 2002–03
- Biggest league defeat: 0–9 vs Slavia Sofia (2 March 1986) — 1985–86
- Biggest cup win: 8–1 vs Pirin Blagoevgrad — 1946
  7–0 vs Torpedo Dimitrovgrad — 1954
- Biggest cup defeat: 0–6 vs Minyor Pernik — 1998–99
- Most league points in a season: 75 — 2003–04
- Most league goals in a season: 74 — 2003–04
- Most consecutive wins in the league (single season): 9 — from 23 July 2023 to 23 September 2023
- Most consecutive league games unbeaten (single season): 11 — from 17 February 2002 to 13 April 2002
  from 9 August 2003 to 9 November 2003
  from 6 December 2020 to 21 April 2021
- Record European competition home attendance: 40,000 vs (Italy) Juventus (10 March 1965) — Fairs Cup, Third round 2nd leg, 1964–65

As of 9 November 2024

== Managers ==
=== Notable managers ===
Period	Name	Honours
1982–1983	(Bulgaria) Atanas Dramov	1 Cup of the Soviet Army
2003–2005	(Bulgaria) Eduard Eranosyan	1 First League title 1 Bulgarian Supercup title
2017–2020	(Bosnia and Herzegovina) Bruno Akrapović	2 Bulgarian Cup titles 1 Bulgarian Supercup title

=== Managerial history ===
- (Bulgaria) Stefan Paunov (1969–71)
- (Bulgaria) Ivan Manolov (1971–75)
- (Bulgaria) Borislav Milenov (1975–76)
- (Bulgaria) Atanas Dramov (1977–78)
- (Bulgaria) Dimitar Grigorov (1978–79)
- (Bulgaria) Petar Dimitrov (1979–80)
- (Bulgaria) Atanas Dramov (2) (1982–83)
- (Bulgaria) Atanas Angelov (5 August 1983–September 26, 1983)
- (Bulgaria) Hristo Bonev (29 October 1983–December 22, 1985)
- (Bulgaria) Atanas Dramov (3) (15 February 1986–April 19, 1986)
- (Bulgaria) Gancho Peev (9 August 1986–November 30, 1986)
- (Bulgaria) Hristo Bonev (2) (14 February 1987–May 28, 1988)
- (Bulgaria) Stancho Bonchev (13 August 1988–June 3, 1989)
- (Bulgaria) Mihail Georgiev (12 August 1989–June 8, 1991)
- (Bulgaria) Atanas Dramov (4) (17 August 1991–October 31, 1992)
- (Bulgaria) Petar Miladinov (21 November 1992–June 5, 1993)
- (Bulgaria) Ivan Vutsov (14 August 1993–March 26, 1994)
- (Bulgaria) Voyn Voynov (26 March 1994–June 30, 1994)
- (Bulgaria) Ivan Kuchukov (19 August 1994–June 10, 1995)
- (Bulgaria) Ivan Gluhchev (2 September 1995–October 28, 1995)
- (Bulgaria) Gancho Peev (2) (12 August 1995–August 26, 1995)
- (Bulgaria) Vasil Ankov (5 November 1995–February 24, 1996)
- (Bulgaria) Ivan Marinov (2 March, 1996–1996)
- (Bulgaria) Dinko Dermendzhiev (9 March 1996–May 11, 1996)
- (Bulgaria) Krasimir Manolov (9 August 1996–December 7, 1996)
- (Bulgaria) Ivan Marinov (2) (1996–1997)
- (Bulgaria) Stancho Bonchev (2) (22 February 1997–May 31, 1997)
- (Bulgaria) Radoslav Zdravkov (1997–1997)
- (Bulgaria) Atanas Dramov (5) (1997–1998)
- (Bulgaria) Ivan Gluchev (2) (May 1998–Sept 1998)
- (Bulgaria) Dinko Dermendzhiev (2) (1998–1999)
- (Bulgaria) Georgi Vasilev (1999–1999)
- (Bulgaria) Vladimir Fatov (1999–1999)
- (Bulgaria) Vasil Ankov (2) (1999–2000)
- (Bulgaria) Ayan Sadakov (2000–2000)
- (Bulgaria) Eduard Eranosyan (2000–2001)
- (Bulgaria) Stefan Draganov (2001–2001)
- (Bulgaria) Dimitar Dimitrov (2001–2003)
- (Bulgaria) Eduard Eranosyan (2) (2003–2005)
- (Bulgaria) Ayan Sadakov (2) (2005–2006)
- (Bulgaria) Ivan Marinov (3) (1 September 2006–September 23, 2007)
- (Bulgaria) Yasen Petrov (24 September 2007–March 14, 2008)
- (North Macedonia) Dragi Kanatlarovski (20 March 2008–September 29, 2008)
- (Bulgaria) Ayan Sadakov (3) (29 September 2008–August 10, 2009)
- (Bulgaria) Ivan Marinov (4) (10 August 2009–November 1, 2009)
- (Bulgaria) Stefan Genov (1 November 2009–December 26, 2009)
- (Kosovo) Naci Şensoy (26 December 2009–June 30, 2010)
- (Bulgaria) Hristo Bonev (3) (1 July 2010–October 31, 2010)
- (Bulgaria) Nedelcho Matushev (28 September 2010–April 23, 2011)
- (Serbia) Saša Nikolić (23 April 2011 – 30 June 2011)
- (North Macedonia) Dragi Kanatlarovski (2) (17 June 2011–November 8, 2011)
- (Bulgaria) Emil Velev (8 November 2011–October 9, 2012)
- (Bulgaria) Stefan Genov (2) (13 October 2012–June 30, 2013)
- (Bulgaria) Aleksandar Stankov (1 July 2013 – 29 May 2014)
- (Bulgaria) Emil Velev (2) (9 June 2014 – 8 July 2014)
- (Bulgaria) Nedelcho Matushev (2) (9 July 2014–September 29, 2014)
- (Bulgaria) Hristo Kolev (1 October 2014–February 26, 2016)
- (Bulgaria) Ilian Iliev (26 February 2016–October 17, 2016)
- (Bulgaria) Eduard Eranosyan (3) (31 October 2016–April 9, 2017)
- (Bulgaria) Voyn Voynov (2) (19 April 2017–October 30, 2017)
- (Bosnia and Herzegovina) Bruno Akrapović (31 October 2017–November 10, 2020)
- (Bulgaria) Aleksandar Tunchev (11 November 2020–April 7, 2022)
- (Bulgaria) Aleksandar Tomash (11 April 2022–May 27, 2024)
- (Bulgaria) Lyuboslav Penev (18 June 2024–October 21, 2024)
- (Bulgaria) Hristo Zlatinski (22 October 2024–December 7, 2024)

As of 9 November 2024

Source: loko-pd.com

== Notable supporters ==
- Georgi Bozhilov, painter
- Katya Paskaleva, actress
- Irmana Chichikova, actress
- Sofia Marinkova, actress
- Prof. Krikor Azaryan – professor of Acting and Directing at NATFIZ, chairman of the Bulgarian Association of Theatre Directors
- Atanas Krustev (also known as Nacho Kulturata) – cultural figure, founder of “Old Plovdiv”
- Prof. Dimitar Rouskov – choral conductor and pedagogue
- Nayden Todorov – conductor, Minister of Culture (2023)
- Ivan Demerdzhiev, lawyer and politician
- Andrey Andreev, musicologist
- Kolio Karamfilov – painter, graphic artist and sculptor
- Trifon Nedelchev, sculptor and painter
- Luka Stanchev – chairman of the “Plovdiv Civic Club”, physicist and public figure
- Assoc. Prof. Vladimir Yanev – historian, poet and prose writer
- Dobromir Tonev – poet and editor
- Prof. Atanas Dzhurdzhev – cardiologist, rector of the Medical University (1995–2003)
- Arch. Zdravko Vasilkov, chief architect of Plovdiv (1970–1980)
- Manol Peykov, publisher, translator and politician
- Spas Gurnevski, mayor of Plovdiv (1995–1999)
- Diran Parikyan, mayor of Plovdiv (1971–1979)
- Zdravko Yonchev – painter, long-time announcer at Radio Plovdiv
- Iliyan Dzhevelekov – film director, screenwriter and producer
- Stefan Mavrodiev – theatre and film actor, director
- Lyuben Groys – theatre director, playwright, poet and translator
- Dragomir Simeonov – TV host and actor
- Encho Pironkov, painter
- Stanimir Videv, painter
- Yoan Leviev, painter
- Zdravko Yonchev, painter
- Momchil Andreev – economist and banker
- Nikolay Nedelchev – businessman and entrepreneur
- Atanas Uzunov, football referee
- Eduard Papazyan, sports journalist
- Miroslav Barnyashev (also known as Aleksander Rusev) – professional wrestler
- Vasil Milenchev – fencing referee, one of the most recognized Bulgarian referees in all sports
- Tsvetana Pironkova, tennis player
- Dimitar Kuzmanov, tennis player
- Todor Enev, tennis player
- Kiril Pandov, boxer
- Aleksandar Hristov, boxer
- Plamena Mitkova, athlete
- Gabriela Petrova, athlete
- Iosif Miladinov, swimmer
- Rumen Yovchev, TV host
