= Bruno Akrapović =

Bosnian football manager (born 1967)

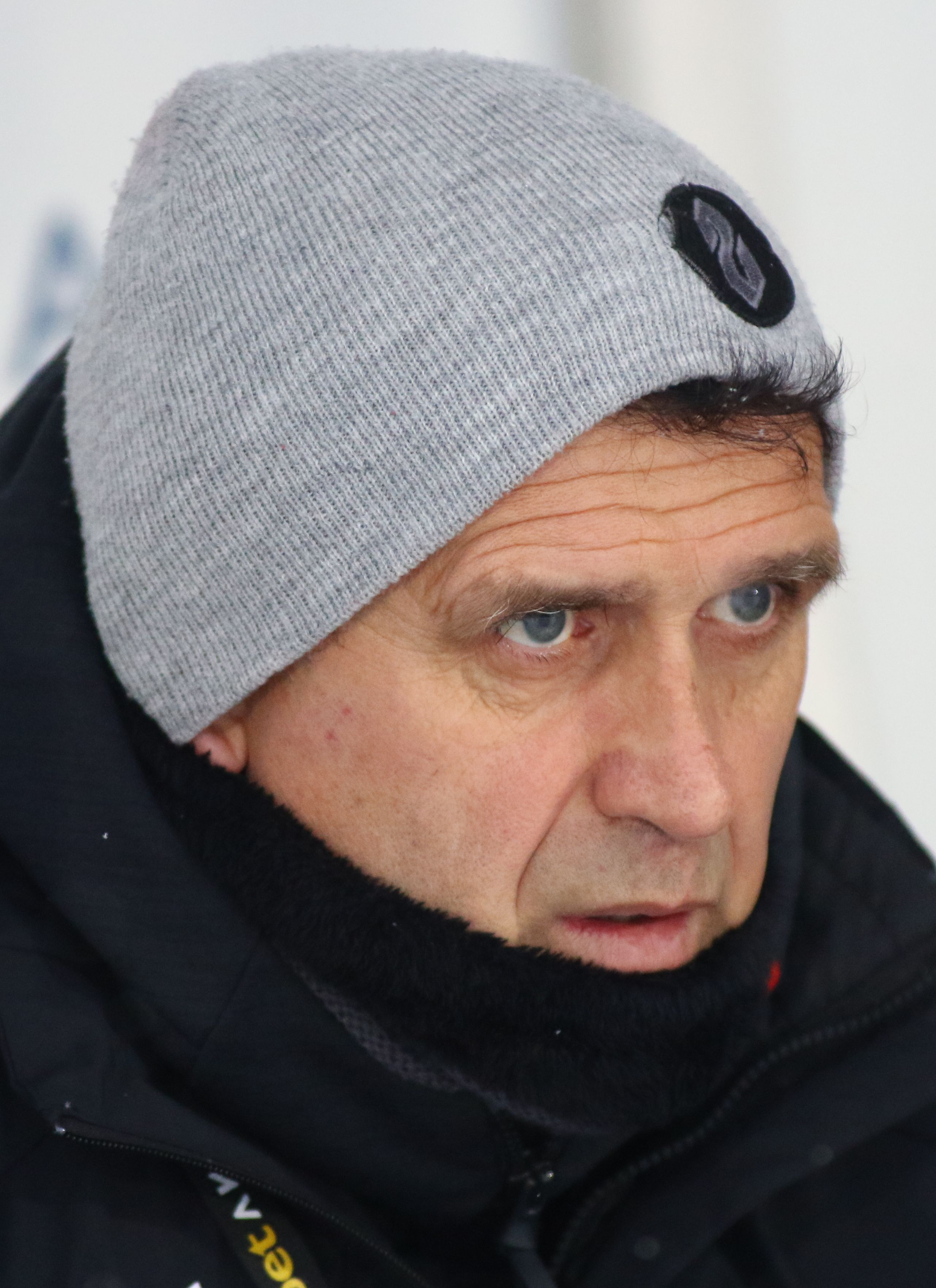
- Akrapović with CSKA Sofia in 2021

Personal information
- Date of birth: 26 September 1967 (age 59)
- Place of birth: Zenica, SR Bosnia and Herzegovina, SFR Yugoslavia
- Height: 1.81 m (5 ft 11 in)
- Position: Midfielder

Youth career
- –1987: Čelik Zenica

Senior career*
Years	Team	Apps	(Gls)
1987–1988	Čelik Zenica		
1988–1990	Arminia Hannover	33	(2)
1990–1991	RSV Göttingen 05	33	(3)
1991–1992	TuS Celle	16	(2)
1992–1994	VfL Wolfsburg	79	(0)
1994–1997	Mainz 05	97	(2)
1997–2000	TeBe Berlin	84	(3)
2000–2002	Energie Cottbus	67	(0)
2003	Rot-Weiß Erfurt	9	(0)
2003–2005	Kickers Offenbach	55	(1)
2005	Arminia Hannover	16	(2)
Total		489	(15)

International career
2000–2002	Bosnia and Herzegovina	14	(1)

Managerial career
- 2011–2012: Mosor
- 2013: Solin
- 2014: Neretva
- 2014–2015: Europa
- 2015–2016: Shkëndija
- 2017: RNK Split
- 2017–2020: Lokomotiv Plovdiv
- 2020–2021: CSKA Sofia
- 2021–2022: Shkëndija
- 2022: Al-Wehda
- 2022–2023: Akritas Chlorakas
- 2024: Željezničar
- 2024–2025: Hebar Pazardzhik
- * Club domestic league appearances and goals

Bruno Akrapović (born 26 September 1967) is a Bosnian professional football manager and former player.

== Club career ==
Starting his career in his native Bosnia and Herzegovina, at the time part of Yugoslavia, Akrapović spent the majority of his career playing for various clubs in the Bundesliga and 2. Bundesliga, among others VfL Wolfsburg, Mainz 05 and Energie Cottbus. He played alongside Jürgen Klopp at Mainz between 1994 and 1997.

== International career ==
Akrapović made his senior debut for Bosnia and Herzegovina in a March 2000 friendly match against Macedonia and has earned a total of 14 caps, scoring one goal. His final international was a September 2002 European Championship qualification match against Romania.

== Managerial career ==
On 16 January 2010, Akrapović received his UEFA Pro Licence in the Football Association of Bosnia and Herzegovina's educational facility in Jablanica.

Akrapović managed Shkëndija in the Macedonian First League and RNK Split in Croatia, before relocating to Bulgaria in 2017 to become the manager of Lokomotiv Plovdiv where he won the Bulgarian Cup twice in a row in the seasons 2018–19 and 2019–20, as well as the Bulgarian Supercup in 2020.

On 14 June 2022, Akrapović was appointed as manager of Saudi Pro League club Al-Wehda. On 20 October 2022, he was sacked after only two wins in eight matches. On 30 December 2022, Akrapović was appointed as manager of Cypriot side Akritas Chlorakas. On 27 February 2023, he was sacked after only two months.

On 8 January 2024, Akrapović became the manager of his native Bosnian Premier League club Željezničar, signing a one-and-a-half-year contract. His first game in charge of Željezničar was a 0–0 home draw against Zrinjski Mostar on 17 February 2024. He suffered his first defeat as Željezničar manager on 26 February, losing 2–0 away to Široki Brijeg. He was victorious in his first Sarajevo derby, beating rivals Sarajevo 3–0 at home on 3 March 2024. Following a series of poor results, and with Željezničar sitting in the relegation zone with four points from their previous six games, Akrapović and the club mutually terminated his contract on 20 April 2024.

== Personal life ==
Akrapović's wife is Italian, and their son Aaron Akrapović used to represent the Italy U17 national team.

== Career statistics ==
=== International ===
Appearances and goals by national team and year
National team	Year	Apps	Goals
Bosnia and Herzegovina	2000	4	1
Bosnia and Herzegovina	2001	7	0
Bosnia and Herzegovina	2002	3	0
Total		14	1

Scores and results list Bosnia and Herzegovina's goal tally first, score column indicates score after each Akrapović goal.

International goal scored by Bruno Akrapović
No.	Date	Venue	Opponent	Score	Result	Competition
1	11 October 2000	Ramat Gan Stadium, Ramat Gan, Israel	Israel	1–1	3–1	2002 FIFA World Cup Qualifiers

=== Managerial ===
As of match played 19 April 2024

Team	From	To	Record				
Team	From	To	G	W	D	L	Win %
Mosor	11 July 2011	30 June 2012	28	15	7	6	53.57
Solin	23 September 2013	9 December 2013	11	1	7	3	9.09
Europa	2 November 2014	21 June 2015	17	9	5	3	52.94
Shkëndija	22 December 2015	27 October 2016	33	22	4	7	66.67
Split	13 February 2017	30 June 2017	18	2	5	11	11.11
Lokomotiv Plovdiv	31 October 2017	10 November 2020	116	49	29	38	42.24
CSKA Sofia	11 November 2020	28 March 2021	16	11	2	3	68.75
Shkëndija	2 August 2021	4 April 2022	25	13	9	3	52.00
Al-Wehda	16 June 2022	20 October 2022	8	2	1	5	25.00
Akritas Chlorakas	30 December 2022	27 February 2023	10	1	2	7	10.00
Željezničar	8 January 2024	20 April 2024	9	2	2	5	22.22
Total			291	127	73	91	43.64

== Honours ==
=== Player ===
TeBe Berlin

- Regionalliga Nordost: 1997–98

=== Manager ===
Europa

- Gibraltar Premier Cup: 2014–15

Shkëndija

- Macedonian Cup: 2015–16

Lokomotiv Plovdiv

- Bulgarian Cup: 2018–19, 2019–20
- Bulgarian Supercup: 2020
