= Birsent Karagaren =

Bulgarian footballer

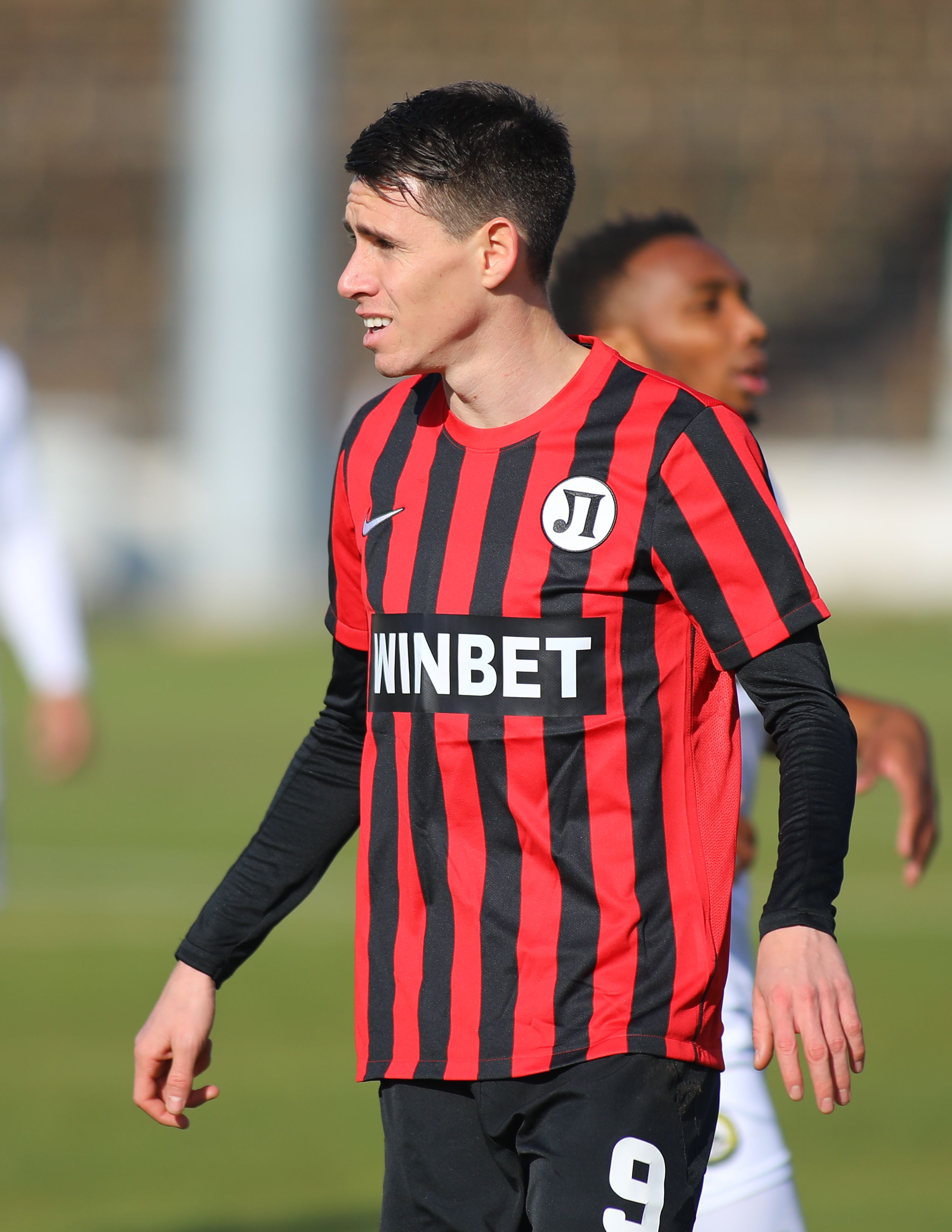

Personal information
- Full name: Birsent Hamdi Karagaren
- Date of birth: 6 December 1992 (age 33)
- Place of birth: Asenovgrad, Bulgaria
- Height: 1.79 m (5 ft 10 in)
- Position: Winger

Team information
- Current team: Arda Kardzhali
- Number: 99

Youth career
- Asenovets
- –2011: Lokomotiv Plovdiv

Senior career*
Years	Team	Apps	(Gls)
2011–2012	Asenovets	26	(5)
2012	Shumen	12	(0)
2013	Etar 1924	2	(0)
2013–2014	Vereya	28	(23)
2014–2016	Lokomotiv Plovdiv	62	(9)
2017–2018	Dunav Ruse	48	(11)
2018–2023	Lokomotiv Plovdiv	139	(23)
2023–2025	CSKA 1948	79	(9)
2025	CSKA 1948 II	1	(0)
2025–	Arda Kardzhali	36	(9)

International career^{‡}
2019–	Bulgaria	13	(0)
- * Club domestic league appearances and goals as of 11 June 2026 ‡ National team caps and goals as of 20:15, 15 November 2021 (UTC)

Birsent Hamdi Karagaren (Bulgarian: Бирсент Хамди Карагарен; born 6 December 1992) is a Bulgarian professional footballer who plays as a winger for Arda Kardzhali and the Bulgaria national team. He made his debut for his country in October 2019.

== Career ==
=== Early career ===
Born in Asenovgrad, Karagaren played as a youth for local club Asenovets and Lokomotiv Plovdiv. He also spent time in Shumen, Etar 1924 and Vereya, before joined Lokomotiv Plovdiv in 2014.

=== Dunav Ruse ===
On 19 January 2017 Karagaren signed for Dunav Ruse from Lokomotiv Plovdiv. He made his debut for the team on 17 February 2017 in a 0:4 loss to Beroe. In the next match for the league on 24 February, he scored both goals for the 2:0 win against Botev Plovdiv, becoming a man of the match. He scored again in the match against Levski Sofia on 28 February 2017.

=== CSKA 1948 ===
In January 2023, Karagaren became part of the ranks of CSKA 1948. On 25 July 2024, he scored the only goal in the 1:0 victory at home against Montenegrin team Budućnost Podgorica in a UEFA Conference League qualifying match, securing CSKA 1948's first ever win in a European club tournament.

=== Arda Kardzhali ===
In June 2025, it was confirmed that he had joined Arda Kardzhali on a two-year contract. On 31 July 2025, Karagaren netted the equalizing goal for his team in the 2:2 second leg away draw with Finnish team HJK in a UEFA Conference League qualifying match, which was decided in Arda's favour following a penalty shootout. This was the first match in which Arda managed to find the net in European tournaments and also the first time in which it was able to eliminate an opponent and advance to a further round.

== International career ==
Karagaren received his first call-up for senior Bulgarian squad in October 2019 for the UEFA Euro 2020 qualifying matches against Montenegro and England on 11 and 14 October. He made his debut on 11 October 2019 in a game against Montenegro. He substituted Wanderson in the 77th minute.

== Career statistics ==
=== Club ===
As of 23 October 2021

Club	Season	Division	League		Cup (Note: Includes Bulgarian Supercup matches.)		Europe		Total	
Club	Season	Division	Apps	Goals	Apps	Goals	Apps	Goals	Apps	Goals
Asenovets	2011–12	Third League	26	5	0	0	–		26	5
Shumen 2010	2012–13	Second League	12	0	0	0	–		12	0
Etar 1924	2012–13	First League	2	0	0	0	–		2	0
Vereya	2013–14	Third League	28	23	0	0	–		28	23
Lokomotiv Plovdiv	2014–15	First League	30	5	5	1	–		35	6
Lokomotiv Plovdiv	2015–16	First League	26	3	2	0	–		28	3
Lokomotiv Plovdiv	2016–17	First League	6	1	1	1	–		7	2
Dunav Ruse	2016–17	First League	17	5	1	0	–		18	5
Dunav Ruse	2017–18	First League	31	6	0	0	2	0	33	6
Lokomotiv Plovdiv	2018–19	First League	32	3	3	1	–		35	4
Lokomotiv Plovdiv	2019–20	First League	28	7	6	2	4	0	38	9
Lokomotiv Plovdiv	2020–21	First League	31	4	4	1	2	0	37	5
Lokomotiv Plovdiv	2021–22	First League	12	0	1	0	3	0	16	0
Career total			283	62	23	6	11	0	317	68

== Honours ==
=== Club ===
Lokomotiv Plovdiv

- Bulgarian Cup (2): 2018–19, 2019–20
- Bulgarian Supercup: 2020
