= Nikolay Kirov (footballer) =

Bulgarian footballer and manager

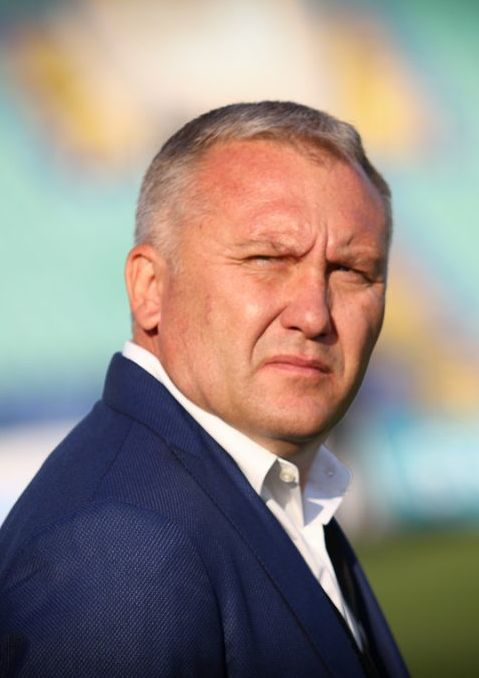

Personal information
- Full name: Nikolay Stoilov Kirov
- Date of birth: 12 June 1975 (age 51)
- Place of birth: Plovdiv, Bulgaria
- Position: Goalkeeper

Youth career
- 1982–1992: Maritsa Plovdiv

Senior career*
Years	Team	Apps	(Gls)
1992–1998	Maritsa Plovdiv		
1998–2001	Botev Plovdiv	22	(0)
2001	Dobrudzha Dobrich		

Managerial career
- 2002–2005: Maritsa Plovdiv (assistant)
- 2005–2006: Maritsa Plovdiv
- 2007: Maritsa Plovdiv (assistant)
- 2007: Maritsa Plovdiv
- 2007–2011: Spartak Plovdiv
- 2014: Botev Plovdiv (assistant)
- 2015: Botev Plovdiv (assistant)
- 2016–2019: Botev Plovdiv
- 2020–2021: Arda Kardzhali
- 2021–2022: CSKA 1948
- 2022–2023: Beroe Stara Zagora
- 2024: Arda Kardzhali
- 2024–2025: Spartak Varna
- 2025: Botev Plovdiv
- * Club domestic league appearances and goals

Nikolay Kirov (Bulgarian: Николай Киров; born 12 June 1975) is a Bulgarian football manager and former footballer.

== Coaching career ==
=== Maritsa Plovdiv ===
Kirov started his career as assistant manager at his hometown club Maritsa Plovdiv. He was soon promoted to manager but in January 2007 became assistant again when the much more experienced Petar Zehtinski was appointed as manager. However, he resigned in two months and Kirov was restored as manager.

=== Spartak Plovdiv ===
On 13 June 2007, Kirov was appointed as manager of Spartak Plovdiv. He left the club after the 2010–11 season due to the continuing financial crisis.

=== Botev Plovdiv ===
On 14 June 2011, Kirov was announced as the head of youth department of Botev Plovdiv, a position he held until 10 January 2017. Kirov served as assistant manager of Velislav Vutsov in 2014 and Ermin Šiljak in 2015.

==== 2016-17 ====
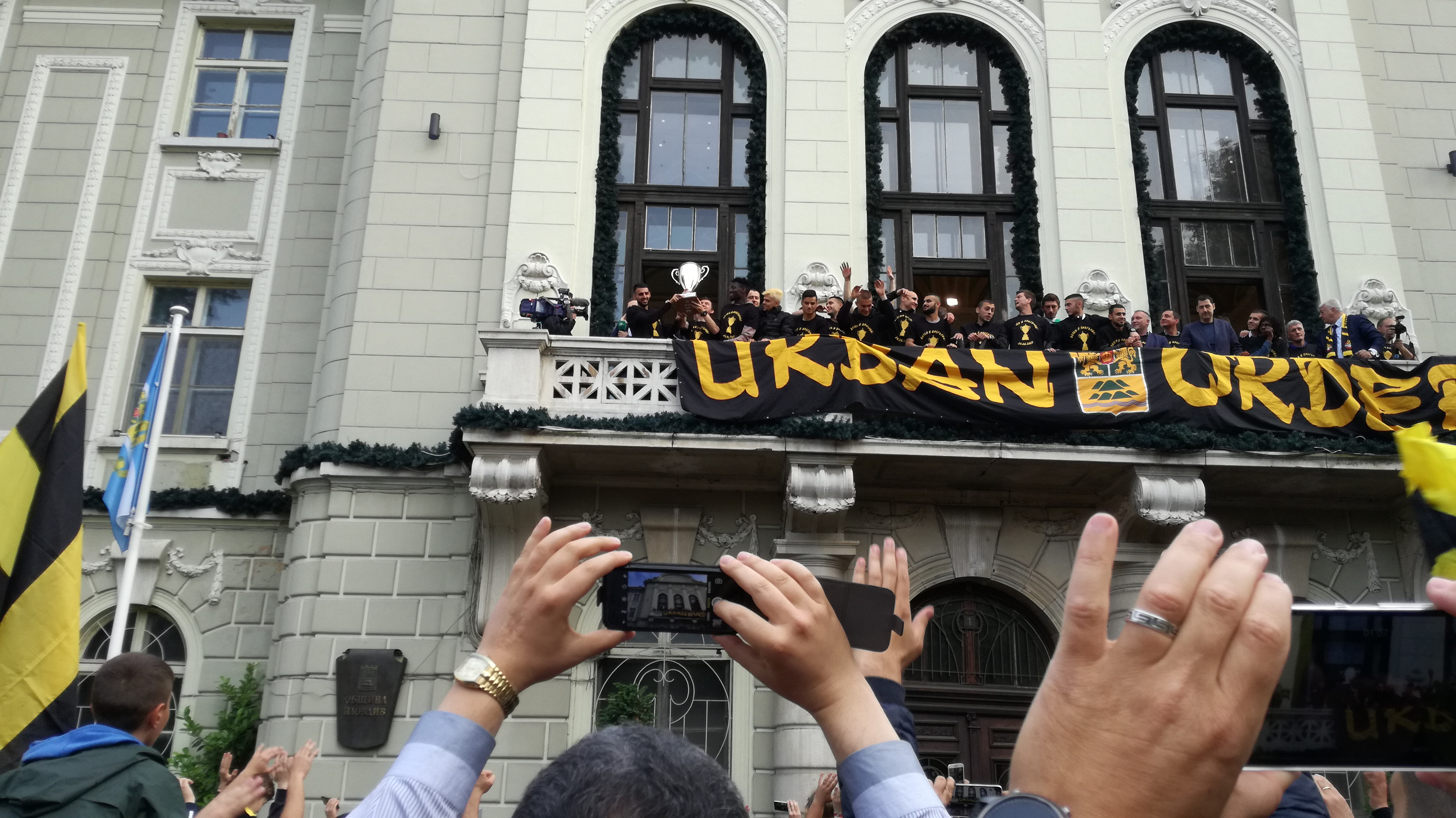
Nikolay Kirov celebrating winning the Bulgarian Football Cup with Botev Plovdiv in 2017

On 1 September 2016, following Nikolay Mitov's short tenure, Kirov was appointed as interim manager – an assignment made permanent in January 2017. His first new signing was Omar Kossoko who joined the club on a free transfer on 29 September. Nikolai Kirov and his assistant manager Ivan Kochev, stabilized and improved the performance of the team. The most memorable and impressive game in 2016 was the tremendous 3–4 away win over Beroe Stara Zagora with spectacular goals by Todor Nedelev, João Paulo and Omar Kossoko.

During the winter break Kirov brought several new key players to Botev Plovdiv: Antonio Vutov, Victor Genev, Ivan Čvorović and Fernando Viana. Lazar Marin returned to the club after a short and unsuccessful stay at CSKA Sofia. In the meantime, due to financial difficulties João Paulo, the most valuable player from the first part of the season, was sold to Ludogorets Razgrad.

With Nikolay Kirov in charge Botev failed to qualify for the championship round playoffs of the Bulgarian First League. However the club finished second in Group A of the relegation rounds and after that defeated Beroe Stara Zagora in the European play-offs. The 7–1 win over PFC Montana from 7 April 2017 is memorable not only as the biggest win during the season but also because the first goal scored by the then 15-year-old Kris Dobrev who become the youngest goalscorer in Bulgarian league history. Under the guidance of Kirov Botev Plovdiv eliminated Neftochimic Burgas, Pirin Blagoevgrad and FC Vereya to reach the Bulgarian Cup final. On 24 May 2017 Kirov lead Botev to a 2–1 victory in the Bulgarian Cup final against Ludogorets winning the club's first trophy in 36 years. Due to the win Botev managed to qualify for the 2017-18 UEFA Europa League.

==== 2017-18 ====
Due to financial difficulties most of the first team players from the previous successful season were sold by the end of 2017. Antonio Vutov decided to join his previous team Levski Sofia for the new season. The goalkeeper Georgi Georgiev was upset for not being in the starting lineup for the Bulgarian Cup final and he left immediately because his contract expired. After winning the Bulgarian Supercup Victor Genev left to sign with an Israeli club. At the beginning of August Omar Kossoko was sold to Al-Fujairah. A few months later Fernando Viana was also sold. Krum Stoyanov, Yaya Meledje and Tsvetomir Panov left during the winter break.

Kirov had to fill the gaps in his squad and during the summer and the autumn several new players joined on free transfers: Plamen Dimov, Álvaro Juliano, Daniel Kajzer, Steven Petkov, Daudet N'Dongala, and Gustavo Sauer. The start of the season was very successful - on 9 August 2017, Nikolay Kirov and his team won the first Bulgarian Supercup in the history of Botev Plovdiv following a 1–1 draw and a victory through penalty shootout against Ludogorets.

During the winter break Nikolay Kirov brought two ex-players back to Botev Plovdi: João Paulo on a loan until the end of the season and the right-back Filip Filipov. The other new signings were the Brazilian forward Diogo Campos Gomes and the defender Dimitar Pirgov. In the last official home game from the season of First League, 2–0 win over FC Vereya, Kirov made a substitute and allowed Stanislav Shopov to make an official debut for the first-team just at the age of 16. Botev Plovdiv finished 5th in First League and was eliminated by Slavia Sofia at the semi-finals of the Bulgarian Cup after several controversial refereeing decisions.

=== Beroe ===
Kirov served as manager of Beroe Stara Zagora between September 2022 and June 2023.

== Honours ==
- Bulgarian Cup (1): 2016–17
- Bulgarian Supercup (1): 2017
- Bulgarian football manager of the year - Runner-up (2017)

== Managerial statistics ==
As of 25 September 2025

Team	From	To	Record				
Team	From	To	G	W	D	L	Win %
Maritsa Plovdiv	13 June 2005	15 December 2006	43	20	10	13	46.51
Maritsa Plovdiv	13 March 2007	27 May 2007	11	3	3	5	27.27
Spartak Plovdiv	13 June 2007	1 July 2011	112	46	28	38	41.07
Botev Plovdiv	24 August 2016	29 May 2019	130	56	32	42	43.08
Arda Kardzhali	21 April 2020	3 September 2021	48	19	16	13	39.58
CSKA 1948	3 September 2021	20 May 2022	27	11	7	9	40.74
Beroe Stara Zagora	14 September 2022	6 June 2023	27	6	6	15	22.22
Arda Kardzhali	26 February 2024	31 May 2024	15	5	5	5	33.33
Spartak Varna	20 October 2024	25 June 2025	26	10	3	13	38.46
Botev Plovdiv	28 June 2025	25 September 2025	9	2	1	6	22.22
Total			448	178	111	159	39.73
