= Radoslav Apostolov =

Bulgarian footballer

Personal information
- Full name: Radoslav Hristov Apostolov
- Date of birth: 7 June 1997 (age 29)
- Place of birth: Plovdiv, Bulgaria
- Height: 1.79 m (5 ft 10 in)
- Position: Midfielder

Team information
- Current team: Dunav Ruse
- Number: 14

Youth career
- Botev Plovdiv

Senior career*
Years	Team	Apps	(Gls)
2016–2019	Botev Plovdiv	21	(0)
2016	→ Levski Karlovo (loan)	14	(0)
2018	→ Nesebar (loan)	11	(1)
2018	→ Nesebar (loan)	13	(3)
2019–2020	Neftochimic	18	(2)
2020–2021	Beroe	2	(0)
2021–2022	Etar Veliko Tarnovo	34	(4)
2022–2023	Maritsa	31	(6)
2023–2024	Al-Arabi	0	(0)
2023–2024	→ Dunav Ruse (loan)	0	(0)
2024–	Dunav Ruse	64	(17)

International career
2016	Bulgaria U19	3	(0)
- * Club domestic league appearances and goals as of 11 June 2026

Radoslav Apostolov (Bulgarian: Радослав Апостолов; born 7 June 1997) is a Bulgarian professional footballer who plays as a midfielder for Dunav Ruse, which he captains.

== Career ==
Apostolov made his senior debut for the club as a first-half substitute in a 3–1 home win over Cherno More Varna on 13 March 2016. During the second half he was fouled for a penalty kick, which Lachezar Baltanov scored. Apostolov was loaned to FC Levski Karlovo for the beginning of 2016–17 season. In January 2017 he returned to Botev Plovdiv. On 11 March 2017 Apostolov came on as a substitute during the 1–1 away draw with Cherno More Varna. In July 2020, Apostolov joined Beroe Stara Zagora.

In August 2023 he left Maritsa to join Al-Arabi Kuwait, and few days later he was sent on loan to Dunav Ruse. Maritsa announced that Apostolov unilaterally terminates his contract and accuse him of circumventing the rules blaming his transfer to Al-Arabi as fictitious to move to Dunav. He spend the 2023 season suspended, but in May 2024 he won in court and made a full contract move to Dunav.

== International career ==
On 25 March 2016 Apostolov was in the starting lineup of Bulgaria U19 for the 0–1 defeat from Belgium U19.

== Honours ==
Botev Plovdiv

- Bulgarian Cup: 2016–17
- Bulgarian Supercup: 2017
