= Ivan Čvorović =

Footballer (born 1985)

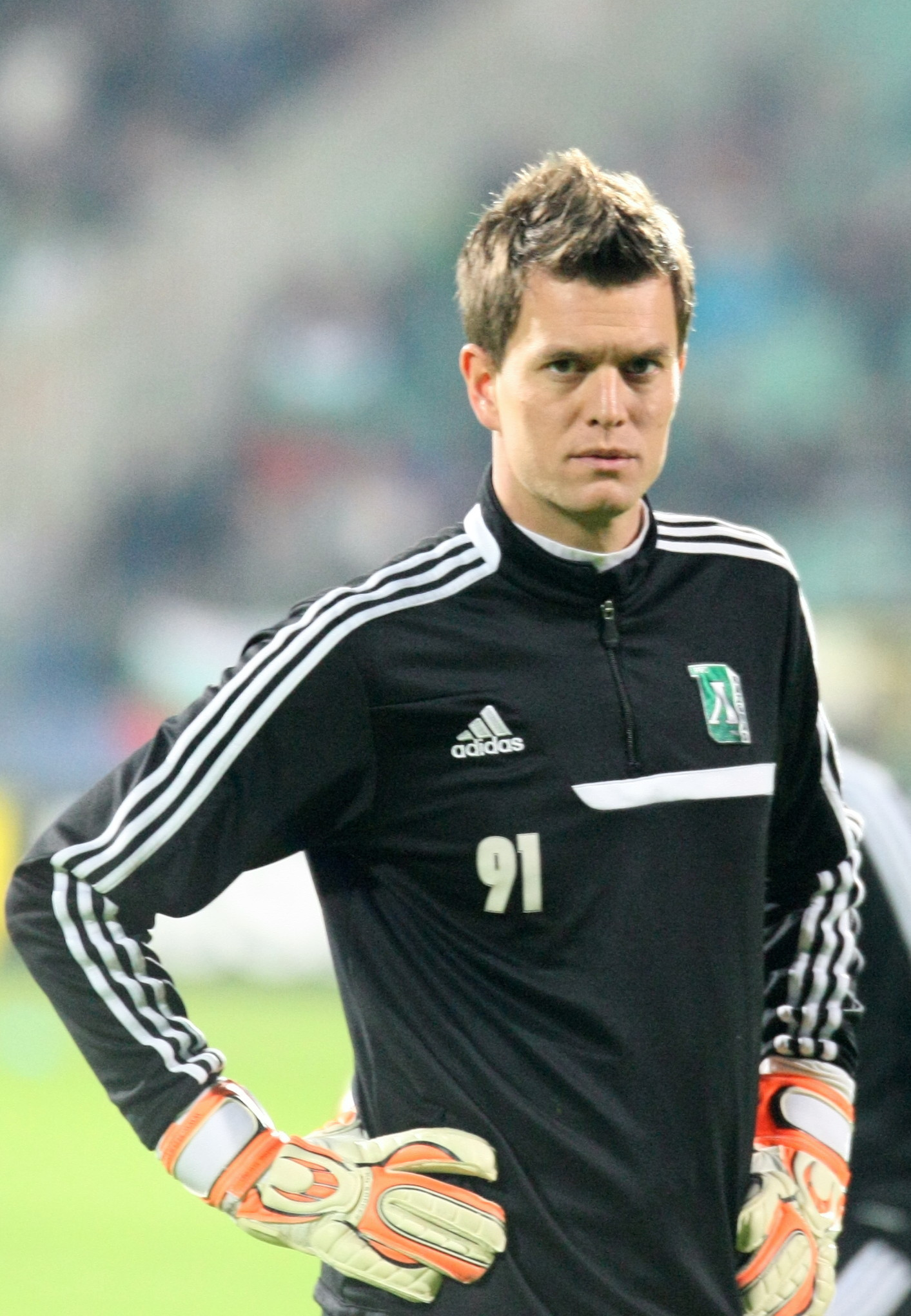
- Čvorović with Ludogorets in 2014

Personal information
- Date of birth: 21 September 1985 (age 41)
- Place of birth: Belgrade, SR Serbia, SFR Yugoslavia
- Height: 1.94 m (6 ft 4 in)
- Position: Goalkeeper

Youth career
- Partizan

Senior career*
Years	Team	Apps	(Gls)
2002–2003	Teleoptik	8	(0)
2003–2004	Srem Jakovo	26	(0)
2005–2007	Naftex Burgas	27	(0)
2007–2008	Chernomorets Burgas	12	(0)
2009–2012	Minyor Pernik	63	(0)
2012–2016	Ludogorets Razgrad	34	(0)
2016	Levski Sofia	1	(0)
2017–2019	Botev Plovdiv	47	(0)
2019	Tsarsko Selo	4	(0)
Total		222	(0)

International career
2012	Bulgaria	1	(0)
- * Club domestic league appearances and goals

Ivan Čvorović (Bulgarian: Иван Чворович, romanized: Ivan Chvorovich, Serbian Cyrillic: Иван Чворовић; born 21 September 1985) is a retired professional footballer who played as a goalkeeper.

Born and raised in Serbia, Čvorović received Bulgarian citizenship in 2012 and subsequently opted to play internationally for the Bulgaria national team. He earned one cap for them in a 2–1 away friendly win over Netherlands on 26 May 2012.

== Club career ==
Born in Belgrade, Čvorović was educated in Partizan's youth academy. His first season as senior was in 2002–03 with Partizan's satellite club FK Teleoptik. The following season, he moved to FK Srem Jakovo where he played a season and a half before moving to Bulgaria.

In 2004, he relocated to Bulgaria, signing a contract with Naftex Burgas. In 2007, he transferred to Chernomorets Burgas. On 6 March 2009, Minyor Pernik signed Čvorović. He took number 91. In May, just after making his debut for the Bulgaria national team, he joined Ludogorets Razgrad.

On 20 January 2017, Čvorović signed a one-year contract with Botev Plovdiv. He made his official debut on 18 February during a 1–0 away win over Lokomotiv Gorna Oryahovitsa. Čvorović lost his first-choice status to Daniel Kajzer during the 2018–19 First League season and left the team in late May 2019 after the expiry of his contract.

== International career ==
In 2012, Čvorović took Bulgarian nationality after having resided in the country for more than five years. He made his debut for the Bulgaria national team in their win against the Netherlands on 26 May 2012, after coming on as a substitute for Stoyan Kolev during the second half.

== Career statistics ==
Appearances and goals by club, season and competition
Club	Season	League		Cup		Europe		Total	
Club	Season	Apps	Goals	Apps	Goals	Apps	Goals	Apps	Goals
Teleoptik	2002–03	8	0	0	0	–		8	0
Srem Jakovo	2003–04	10	0	0	0	–		10	0
Srem Jakovo	2004–05	16	0	0	0	–		16	0
Srem Jakovo	Total	26	0	0	0	–		26	0
Naftex Burgas	2004–05	13	0	0	0	–		13	0
Naftex Burgas	2005–06	10	0	0	0	–		10	0
Naftex Burgas	2006–07	4	0	3	0	–		7	0
Naftex Burgas	Total	27	0	3	0	–		30	0
Chernomorets Burgas	2007–08	1	0	1	0	–		2	0
Chernomorets Burgas	2008–09	9	0	1	0	–		10	0
Chernomorets Burgas	Total	10	0	2	0	–		12	0
Minyor Pernik	2008–09	11	0	1	0	–		12	0
Minyor Pernik	2009–10	5	0	1	0	–		6	0
Minyor Pernik	2010–11	17	0	0	0	–		17	0
Minyor Pernik	2011–12	26	0	3	0	–		29	0
Minyor Pernik	Total	59	0	5	0	0	0	64	0
Ludogorets Razgrad	2012–13	10	0	2	0	0	0	12	0
Ludogorets Razgrad	2013–14	9	0	6	0	1	0	16	0
Ludogorets Razgrad	2014–15	6	0	2	0	0	0	8	0
Ludogorets Razgrad	2015–16	0	0	0	0	0	0	0	0
Ludogorets Razgrad	Total	25	0	8	0	1	0	34	0
Levski Sofia	2016–17	0	0	1	0	0	0	1	0
Botev Plovdiv	2016–17	11	0	1	0	–		12	0
Botev Plovdiv	2017–18	26	0	0	0	6	0	32	0
Botev Plovdiv	2018–19	0	0	1	0	0	0	1	0
Botev Plovdiv	Total	37	0	2	0	6	0	45	0
Career total		193	0	21	0	7	0	221	0

== Honours ==
Ludogorets Razgrad

- Bulgarian A Group: 2012–13, 2013–14, 2014–15
- Bulgarian Cup: 2013–14
- Bulgarian Supercup: 2012

Botev Plovdiv

- Bulgarian Cup: 2016–17
- Bulgarian Supercup: 2017
