= Lazar Marin =

Bulgarian footballer (born 1994)

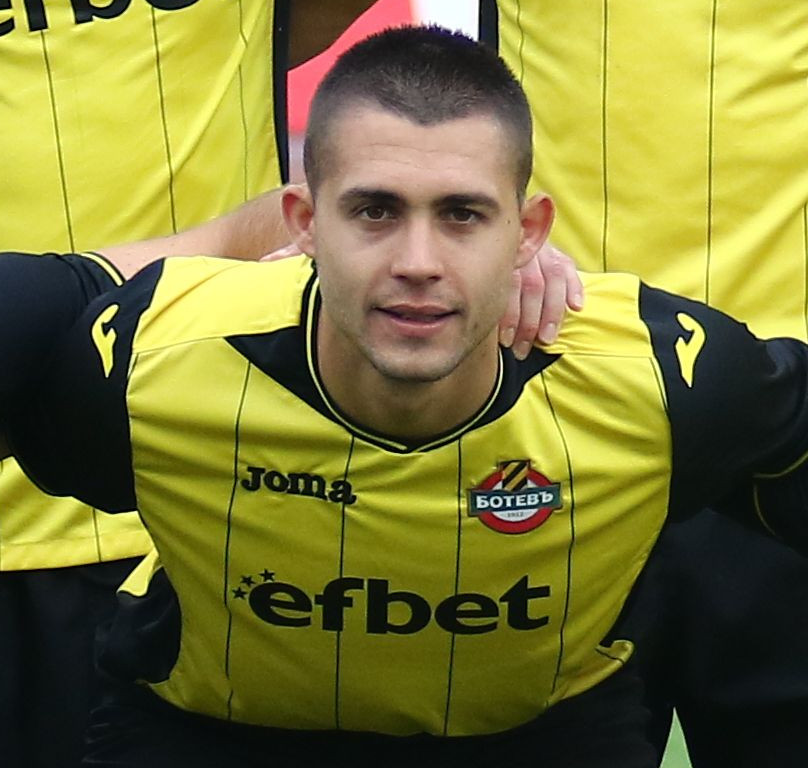

Personal information
- Full name: Lazar Enev Marin
- Date of birth: 9 February 1994 (age 32)
- Place of birth: Saedinenie, Bulgaria
- Height: 1.80 m (5 ft 11 in)
- Positions: Left-back; centre-back

Team information
- Current team: Slavia Sofia
- Number: 24

Youth career
- –2011: Spartak Plovdiv
- 2012–2013: Botev Plovdiv

Senior career*
Years	Team	Apps	(Gls)
2012–2016	Botev Plovdiv	41	(3)
2013–2014	→ Rakovski (loan)	34	(3)
2016	CSKA Sofia	1	(0)
2016	CSKA Sofia II	13	(1)
2017–2018	Botev Plovdiv	42	(1)
2018	Torpedo Kutaisi	16	(1)
2019–2020	Botev Plovdiv	29	(2)
2020–2023	CSKA 1948	65	(0)
2021–2023	CSKA 1948 II	12	(1)
2023–2024	Hebar	31	(1)
2024–2025	Krumovgrad	30	(1)
2025–	Slavia Sofia	44	(2)

International career
2012–2013	Bulgaria U19	5	(0)
2015–2016	Bulgaria U21	5	(0)
- * Club domestic league appearances and goals as of 10 November 2026

Lazar Enev Marin (Bulgarian: Лазар Енев Марин; born 9 February 1994) is a Bulgarian professional footballer who plays as a left-back or centre-back for First League club Slavia Sofia.

== Club career ==
=== Early career ===
Marin began his career at the Spartak Plovdiv academy but moved to Botev Plovdiv along with Radoslav Terziev, Lachezar Angelov and Rosen Andonov in January 2012. In February 2013, he joined Rakovski on loan to gain first team experience. In June 2014, Marin was recalled by his parent club after spending 1 1/2 years with Rakovski and making 34 league appearances.

=== Botev Plovdiv ===
==== 2014–15 season ====
On 7 December 2014, Marin was included in the starting lineup as a left defender during a 2–0 win over PFC Haskovo. A week later he played again 90 minutes and made a solid performance during a 1–0 loss from Ludogorets Razgrad.

On 15 March 2015, Marin participated in the final 30 minutes during a 2–0 home win of Botev Plovdiv over CSKA Sofia. He came on as a substitute for Momchil Tsvetanov and played on the atypical for him position of a left midfielder. A week later, on 22 March, Marin again came on as a substitute and again played on the same position during the 0–0 draw with Ludogorets Razgrad.

On 18 April Marin was included in the starting lineup for the 1–1 draw with Beroe Stara Zagora. He played well but was replaced on the half time due to an injury.

On 3 May 2015, Marin came on a substitute and made an assist for the goal of Tomáš Jirsák during the 3–1 defeat from Ludogorets Razgrad.

Soon after Petar Penchev decided to start using Lazar Marin in more attacking role he scored his first goal in A grupa. On 16 May Marin opened the score with a right footed shot, although he prefers to play with the left foot, during the 3–2 win over CSKA Sofia. In the same game Marin also provided an assist to Ivan Tsvetkov. A week later, on 23 May, Marin scored again but this time Botev Plovdiv lost with 2–1 the away game versus Beroe Stara Zagora.

==== 2015–16 season ====
Lazar Marin established as a regular first team player for Botev Plovdiv during 2015–16 season. He participated in all of the first 10 matches in A Grupa and received 5 yellow cards. He missed the 11th round due to a ban. In the beginning of 2016, after the arrival of Ihor Oshchypko, Marin lost his regular place in the starting line-up. On 6 March, he came on as a substitute during the 1–1 away draw with Beroe Stara Zagora.

On 24 April Marin was in the starting line-up and scored a goal during the 2–1 defeat from Lokomotiv Plovdiv. Five days later, on 29 April, Marin was in the starting line-up during the 2–2 draw with PFC Pirin Blagoevgrad.

=== Return to Botev ===
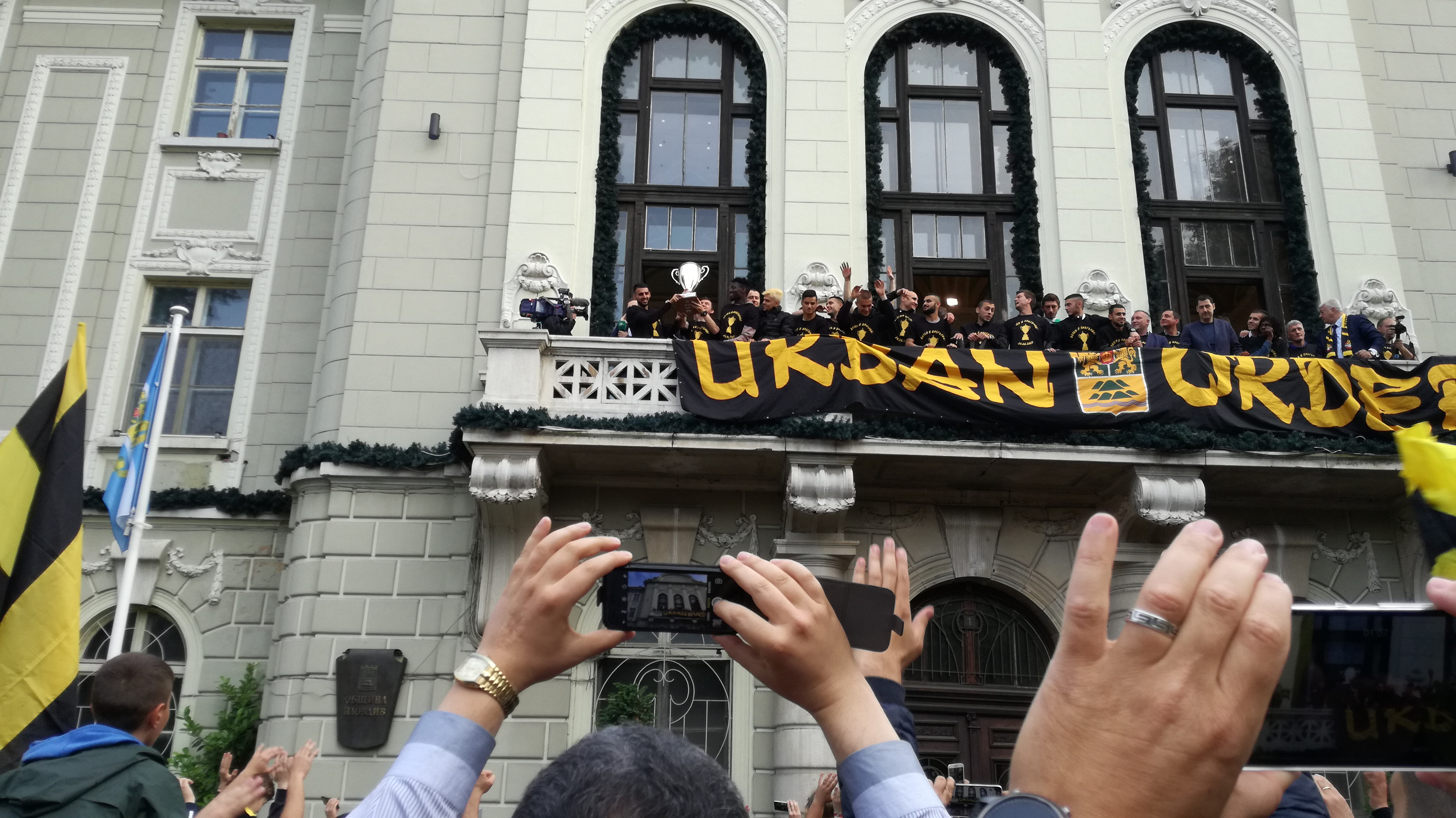
Botev Plovdiv celebrating winning the Bulgarian Football Cup in 2017

In January 2017, Marin returned to Botev Plovdiv as a free agent. On 18 February, he made his debut after the come back during the 1–0 away win over Lokomotiv Gorna Oryahovitsa.

On 24 May 2017, Marin played an important role in the historical 2–1 win over Ludogorets Razgrad in the Bulgarian Cup final and won the cup with Botev Plovdiv.

=== Torpedo Kutaisi ===
On 1 July 2018, Marin signed a one-year contract with Georgian club Torpedo Kutaisi.

=== Hebar Pazardzhik ===
In June 2023, Marin joined Hebar.

== International career ==
=== Under 21 ===
On 31 March 2015, Marin played for Bulgaria U21 during their 3–1 away defeat against Wales U21.

On 21 May 2016, Marin was in the starting lineup during the 1–0 defeat from France U21.

== Career statistics ==
As of 16 February 2019

Appearances and goals by club, season and competition
Club	Season	League			Cup (Note: Includes Bulgarian Supercup as well.)		Europe		Total	
Club	Season	Division	Apps	Goals	Apps	Goals	Apps	Goals	Apps	Goals
Botev Plovdiv	2011–12	B Group	2	0	0	0	–		2	0
Botev Plovdiv	2012–13	A Group	0	0	0	0	–		0	0
Rakovski (loan)	2012–13	B Group	8	0	0	0	–		8	0
Rakovski (loan)	2013–14	B Group	26	3	4	1	–		30	4
Botev Plovdiv	2014–15	A Group	15	2	1	0	2	0	18	2
Botev Plovdiv	2015–16	A Group	24	1	2	0	–		26	1
CSKA Sofia	2016–17	Bulgarian First League	0	0	1	0	–		1	0
CSKA Sofia II	2016–17	Bulgarian Second League	13	1	–		–		13	1
Botev Plovdiv	2016–17	Bulgarian First League	15	0	4	0	–		19	0
Botev Plovdiv	2017–18	Bulgarian First League	27	1	4	0	4	0	35	1
Torpedo Kutaisi	2018	Erovnuli Liga	16	1	3	0	7	1	26	2
Botev Plovdiv	2018–19	Bulgarian First League	1	0	0	0	–		1	0
Career total			147	9	19	1	13	1	179	11

== Honours ==
Botev Plovdiv

- Bulgarian Cup: 2016–17
- Bulgarian Supercup: 2017

Torpedo Kutaisi

- Georgian Cup: 2018
