= Yaya Meledje =

Ivorian footballer (born 1997)

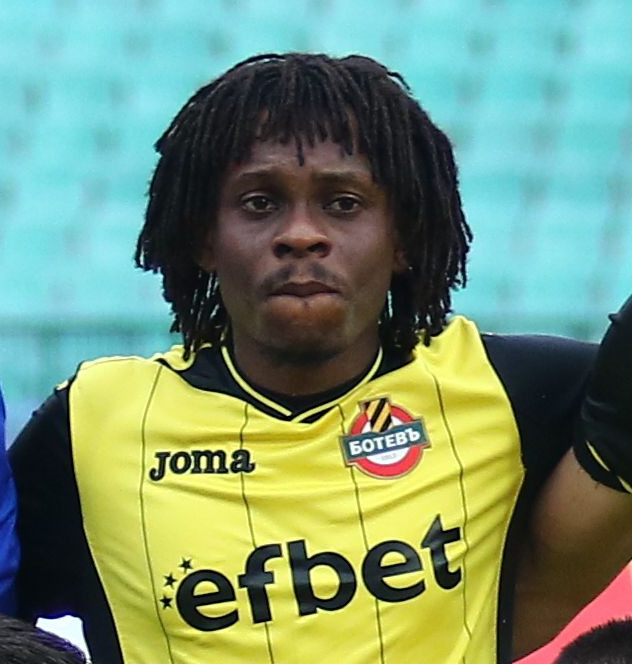

Personal information
- Full name: Meledje Djedjan Omnibes
- Date of birth: 25 September 1997 (age 29)
- Place of birth: San-Pédro, Ivory Coast
- Height: 1.78 m (5 ft 10 in)
- Position: Defensive midfielder

Youth career
- Aspire Academy

Senior career*
Years	Team	Apps	(Gls)
2016	Septemvri Sofia	16	(0)
2016–2017	Botev Plovdiv	37	(0)
2018	Septemvri Sofia	21	(0)
2019–2020	Beroe	20	(0)
2020–2021	Hapoel Hadera	7	(0)
2021	Hapoel Petah Tikva	10	(0)
2021–2022	Mouloudia Oujda	2	(0)
Total		113	(0)
- * Club domestic league appearances and goals as of 18:25, 4 April 2024 (UTC)

Meledje Djedjan Omnibes (born 25 September 1997), known as Yaya Meledje, is an Ivorian professional footballer who plays as a midfielder.

== Career ==
=== Septemvri Sofia ===
In January 2016, Meledje joined Bulgarian Third League club Septemvri Sofia.

=== Botev Plovdiv ===
In July 2016, after a successful trial period, Meledje signed a one-year contract with Bulgarian First League side Botev Plovdiv. He made his debut for Botev in a match against Ludogorets Razgrad on 6 August 2016. On 17 November 2016, Meledje signed an extension to his contract, which would have kept him with the club until 2018. On 24 May 2017, he played for Botev in the Bulgarian Cup Final, helping his team to win the Bulgarian Cup for first time in 36 years.

Meledje marked a good start of the season 2017–18, being chosen for the best eleven for the second round in First League. In the beginning of September Meledje was close to a transfer in the Israeli Premier League, but the transfer failed after the transfer window was closed before any agreement.

=== Return to Septemvri ===
On 21 January 2018, after a few days of speculations, Meledje returned to his previous Bulgarian team Septemvri Sofia, which also owned 40% of his rights. He completed his re-debut for the team on 17 February 2018 in the first league match for the year, against Etar Veliko Tarnovo.

=== Hapoel Hadera ===
On the 21st of July 2020, he signed for the Israeli Premier League club Hapoel Hadera.

== Career statistics ==
=== Club ===
As of 29 March 2019

Club performance			League		Cup		Continental		Other (Note: Includes Bulgarian Supercup and Cup of Bulgarian Amateur Football League matches.)		Total	
Club	League	Season	Apps	Goals	Apps	Goals	Apps	Goals	Apps	Goals	Apps	Goals
Bulgaria			League		Bulgarian Cup		Europe		Other		Total	
Septemvri Sofia	Third League	2015–16	16	0	0	0	–		1	1	17	1
Botev Plovdiv	First League	2016–17	28	0	6	0	–		–		34	0
Botev Plovdiv	First League	2017–18	9	0	1	0	6	0	1	0	17	0
Botev Plovdiv	Total		37	0	7	0	6	0	1	0	51	0
Septemvri Sofia	First League	2017–18	10	0	0	0	–		–		10	0
Septemvri Sofia	First League	2018–19	11	0	1	0	–		–		12	0
Septemvri Sofia	Total		37	0	1	0	0	0	1	1	39	1
Beroe	First League	2018–19	8	0	0	0	–		–		8	0
Beroe	First League	2019–20	12	0	2	0	–		–		14	0
Beroe	Total		20	0	2	0	0	0	0	0	22	0
Hapoel Hadera	Israeli Premier League	2020–21	7	0	0	0	–		4	0	11	0
Hapoel Petah Tikva	Liga Leumit	2020–21	10	0	0	0	–		–		10	0
Mouloudia Oujda	Botola	2021–22	0	0	0	0	–		–		0	0
Career statistics			111	0	10	0	6	0	8	2	135	2

== Honours ==
Botev Plovdiv

- Bulgarian Cup: 2016–17
- Bulgarian Supercup: 2017
