= Krum Stoyanov =

Bulgarian footballer (born 1991)

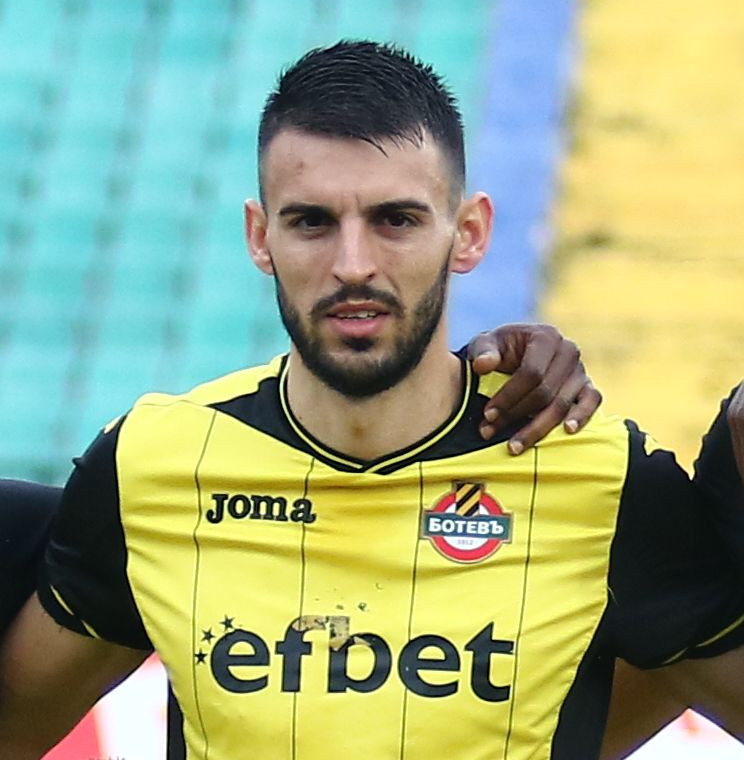

Personal information
- Full name: Krum Stanimirov Stoyanov
- Date of birth: 1 August 1991 (age 35)
- Place of birth: Sliven, Bulgaria
- Height: 1.77 m (5 ft 10 in)
- Positions: Left-back; left winger

Team information
- Current team: Svilengrad

Senior career*
Years	Team	Apps	(Gls)
2009–2011	Chernomorets Pomorie	14	(2)
2011–2014	Chernomorets Burgas	37	(1)
2014–2015	Slavia Sofia	10	(0)
2015–2016	Lokomotiv Plovdiv	28	(0)
2016–2017	Botev Plovdiv	38	(1)
2018	Dinamo Minsk	0	(0)
2018–2019	Etar	46	(2)
2020–2021	Beroe	31	(1)
2021	Arda Kardzhali	2	(0)
2021–2022	CSKA 1948	11	(1)
2022	CSKA 1948 II	3	(0)
2022–2024	Etar Veliko Tarnovo	52	(2)
2024–	Svilengrad		
- * Club domestic league appearances and goals as of 12 June 2024

Krum Stoyanov (Bulgarian: Крум Стоянов; born 1 August 1991) is a Bulgarian professional footballer who plays as a left-back for Svilengrad.

== Career ==
Stoyanov made his A Group debut for Chernomorets Burgas on 24 March 2012 against Vidima-Rakovski Sevlievo.

On 18 June 2015, Stoyanov joined Lokomotiv Plovdiv. He was in the regular starting lineup and played as left back in 27 league games during the 2015–16 season.

=== Botev Plovdiv ===
On 16 June 2016, Stoyanov made a surprising and controversial move to Lokomotiv's bitter rivals Botev Plovdiv.

On 7 April 2017, he scored his first goal for Botev during the 7–1 win over Montana and received the award for man of the match.

=== Dinamo Minsk ===
Stoyanov joined Dinamo Minsk in December 2017 but never took part in any official matches, playing only for the "B" team. He was released in June 2018.

=== Etar ===
On 18 June 2018, Stoyanov signed a two-year contract with Etar.

=== Arda ===
In April 2021, he became part of the Arda Kardzhali team.

=== CSKA 1948 ===
In September 2021, Stoyanov joined CSKA 1948.

=== Etar ===
In July 2022 he agreed terms with Etar Veliko Tarnovo.

== Honours ==
Botev Plovdiv

- Bulgarian Cup: 2016–17
- Bulgarian Supercup: 2017
