= Lachezar Baltanov =

Bulgarian footballer (born 1988)

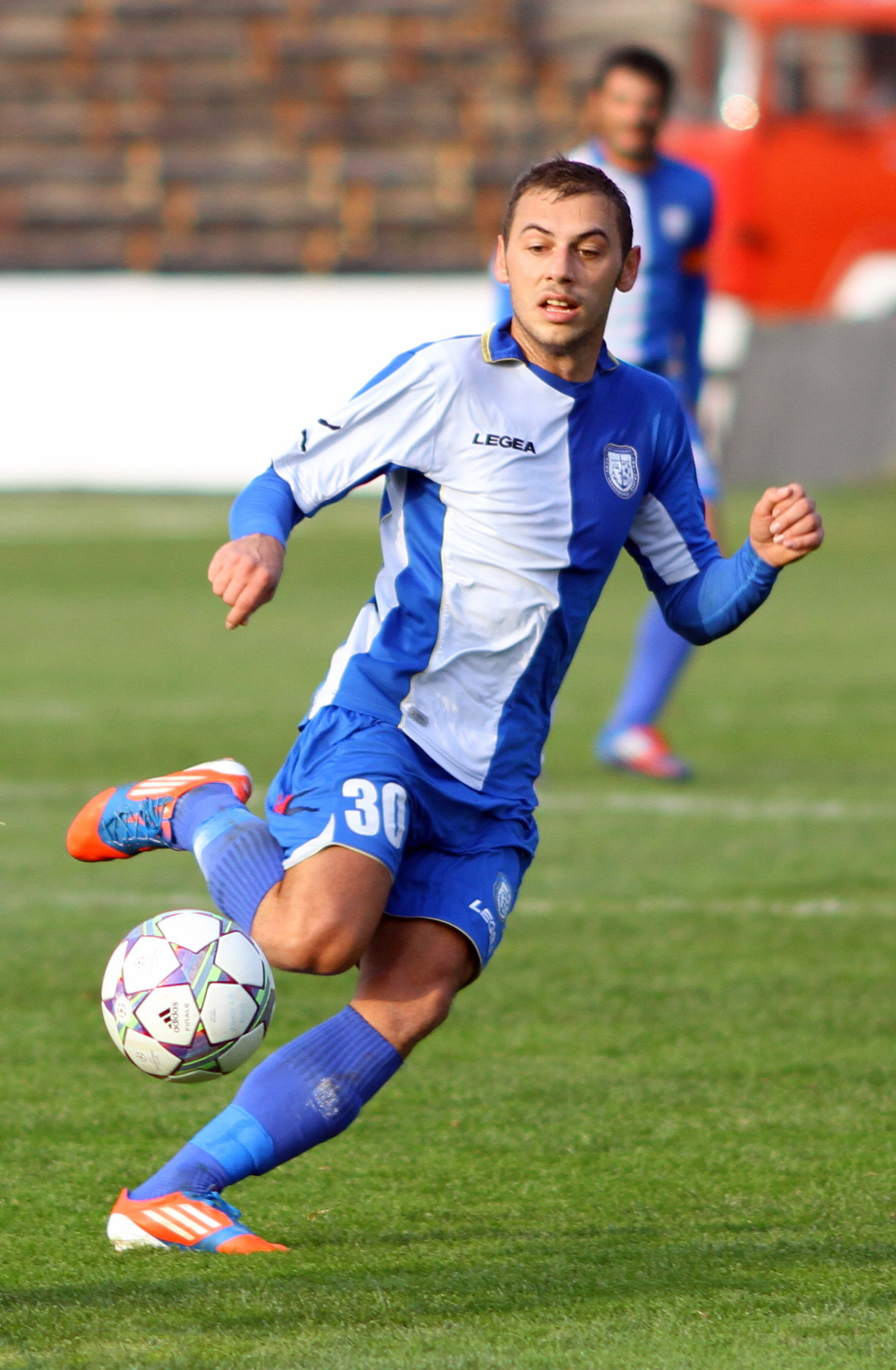

Personal information
- Full name: Lachezar Rosenov Baltanov
- Date of birth: 11 July 1988 (age 38)
- Place of birth: Sofia, Bulgaria
- Height: 1.80 m (5 ft 11 in)
- Position: Central midfielder

Team information
- Current team: Botev Plovdiv (caretaker)

Youth career
- Levski Sofia

Senior career*
Years	Team	Apps	(Gls)
2005–2012	Levski Sofia	51	(1)
2011	→ Kaliakra (loan)	8	(0)
2012	→ Botev Vratsa (loan)	12	(2)
2012–2014	Chernomorets Burgas	45	(9)
2014	Levski Sofia	0	(0)
2014–2020	Botev Plovdiv	166	(25)
2020–2021	Tsarsko Selo	38	(4)
2022–2024	Botev Plovdiv	23	(0)
2022–2024	Botev Plovdiv II	26	(2)
Total		369	(43)

International career
2006–2009	Bulgaria U21	5	(4)
2015	Bulgaria	1	(0)

Managerial career
- 2024–2025: Botev Plovdiv II (assistant)
- 2025–: Botev Plovdiv (assistant)
- 2026: Botev Plovdiv (caretaker)
- * Club domestic league appearances and goals as of 11:02, 23 February 2026 (UTC)

Lachezar Baltanov (Bulgarian: Лъчезар Балтанов; born 11 July 1988) is a Bulgarian retired professional footballer who played as a central midfielder and now manager.

== Career ==
=== Levski Sofia ===
He raised through PFC Levski Sofia youth ranks and finally graduated to the first team. Baltanov later became a Champion of Bulgaria in 2009. Baltanov scored his first goal for Levski on 20 April 2010 in a match against Lokomotiv Mezdra.

On 10 May 2011 was returned to Levski from Kaliakra through injury. He left the club from Sofia in early June 2012, when his contract had expired.

=== Chernomorets Burgas ===
Baltanov joined Chernomorets Burgas on 22 June 2012. He became captain of Chernomorets Burgas during season 2013/2014. Unfortunately, the team was relegated from Bulgarian A Football Group and he quit at the end of the same season.

=== Botev Plovdiv ===
==== 2014-15 ====
In the summer of 2014 Baltanov returned to Levski Sofia. Shortly after that his contract was terminated on mutual agreement and he immediately signed as a free agent with Botev Plovdiv.

Baltanov scored a tremendous goal at the debut for his new team in the spectacular draw between Botev Plovdiv and Litex Lovech. He scored the second goal of the game and the final result was 3-3. Baltanov quickly become a key player and scored his second goal for the club in A Grupa against Slavia Sofia. Botev Plovdiv won this game 2–0. He scored a header again in the next round of A Grupa when Botev Plovdiv achieved its first away victory for the season against Haskovo. Baltanov was included in the starting lineup for the subsequent games against Ludogorets Razgrad and Marek Dupnitza but he missed the first round of the Bulgarian Cup against Lokomotiv Mezdra due to minor injury. He recovered quickly and was again in the starting lineup for the derby game with Lokomotiv Plovdiv which was won by Botev Plovdiv 2–0.

On 15 November Botev Plovdiv played a friendly game with Panthrakikos and Baltanov scored a header in a 2–0 win over the Greek football team.

On 3 December Baltanov once again proved his excellent heading skills when he made an assist for Ivan Tsvetkov in the derby match against Lokomotiv Plovdiv but Botev Plovdiv was dramatically defeated with two goals in the last 6 minutes of the game. Four days later, on 7 December 2014, Baltanov made an assist for the first goal and scored the second goal for the 2–0 win over PFC Haskovo.

On 10 March Baltanov scored the opening goal for the 0–2 away win over the local rivals Lokomotiv Plovdiv. Five days later, on 15 March, Baltanov scored again with a right footed shot for the 2–0 victory over CSKA Sofia.

On 16 May, Baltanov performed extremely well and scored the second goal for Botev Plovdiv during the 3–2 victory over CSKA Sofia. He also received a yellow card, his 9th for the season, which ruled him out for the last two games in A Grupa.

Baltanov scored a total of 7 goals in 25 A Grupa games in the 2014–15 season. He also participated in 2 games in the Bulgarian Cup. The statistics show that this was the best season in his career so far. He was elected for the best player of the season by the fans of Botev Plovdiv.

==== 2015-16 ====
On 18 July Baltanov provided an assist for Daniel Genov's goal in the 1–1 draw versus Levski Sofia in the first round of A Grupa. In the 7th round Baltanov was sent off during the second half of the game against PFC Cherno More Varna. Despite his red card his teammates won the game with 2–1.

On 19 September 2015 Baltanov scored his first goal in the season during the 2–1 away defeat from PFC Ludogorets Razgrad. Four days later, on 23 September, Baltanov scored twice and made an assist during the 0–4 away win over FC Septemvri Simitli in the 1/16 final of the Bulgarian Cup.

On 22 November Baltanov scored a penalty for the 1–2 away victory against Cherno More Varna.

On 13 December Baltanov scored the equalizer for the 1–1 away draw with PFC Montana in the last official game of Botev Plovdiv for 2015.

On 20 February 2016 Baltanov scored during the 1–0 home win in the local derby against Lokomotiv Plovdiv. After that he was selected for man of the match and the best player in the 21 round of A Grupa. In the next round, on 28 February, Baltanov made an assist for the goal of Todor Nedelev in the 2–2 draw with PFC Pirin Blagoevgrad.

On 13 March, Baltanov scored two goals for the 3–1 win over Cherno More Varna. He received the award for man of the match.

On 16 April Baltanov scored a goal for the 2–2 draw with PFC Montana.

==== 2016-17 ====
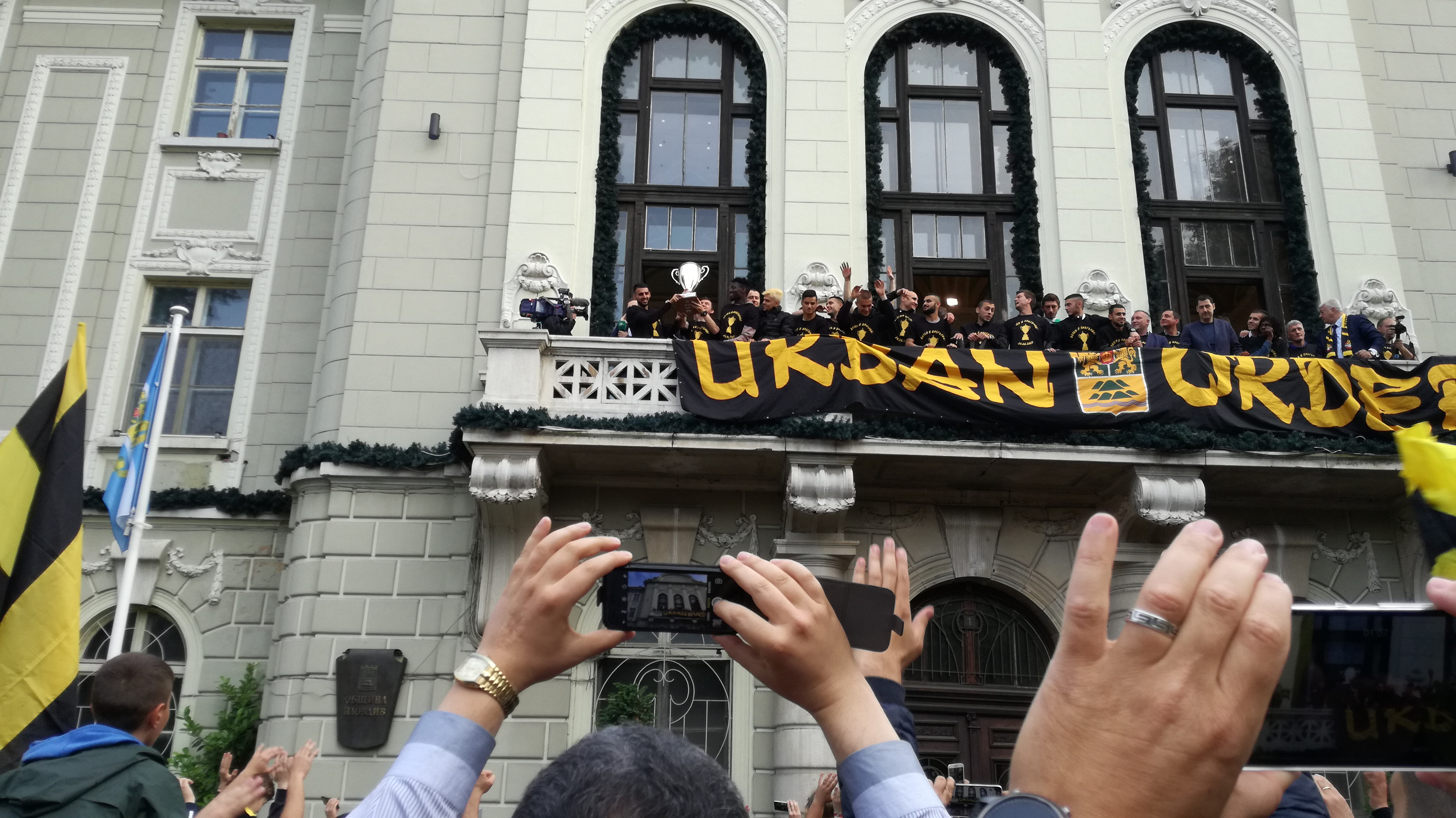
Baltanov and his teammates from Botev Plovdiv celebrating winning the Bulgarian Football Cup in 2017

Baltanov became the new captain of the team after the departure of Yordan Hristov. During the preseason friendly games Baltanov scored against FC Eurocollege.

Baltanov missed all games during the autumn in 2016 due to a severe injury. He returned on 18 February for the first game in 2017 when Botev Plovdiv achieved 0–1 away victory over Lokomotiv Gorna Oryahovitsa. In the next round, on 24 February, Baltanov missed a penalty during the 0–2 home defeat from FC Dunav. Baltanov was devastated and apologized to the fans. Soon after that Baltanov showed his excellent skills and proved that he has quickly regained back his good shape following the injury, during the 1–1 away draw with Cherno More Varna. He scored a goal and was selected for the man of the match.

On 4 April, Botev Plovdiv defeated PFC Pirin Blagoevgrad and proceed to the semi-finals of the Bulgarian Cup thanks to the goal of Baltanov. Three days later, on 7 April, he scored again and provided three assists during the 7–1 win over PFC Montana.

On 24 May Botev Plovdiv achieved a tremendous success by winning with 2–1 against Ludogorets Razgrad and Baltanov, as the captain of the team, lifted the Bulgarian Cup for the third time in the history of the club.

==== 2017-18 ====
On 6 July 2017 Baltanov provided an assist to Felipe Brisola for the only goal during the 1–0 win over Partizani Tirana in the 1st qualifying round of UEFA Europa League. After that he missed a couple of games due to an injuring. On 20 July Baltanov scored a goal and provided an assist during the 4–0 win over Beitar Jerusalem in the 2nd qualifying round of UEFA Europa League. Three days later, on 23 July, Baltanov came on as a substitute and scored a goal to secure the 2–3 win of Botev Plovdiv over Slavia Sofia.

On 10 September, Baltanov scored a beautiful goal for the spectacular 2–1 win over Levski Sofia. A few days later, on 18 September, Baltanov scored a penalty at the beginning of the away game against Ludogorets Razgrad which his team lost with 1–2. The exceptional form of Baltanov continued as he came on as a substitute on 21 September and scored 2 goals for the 1–3 away win in the 1/16 final of the Bulgarian Cup against Lokomotiv Gorna Oryahovitsa.

On 28 November Baltanov scored for the 1–1 draw with Beroe Stara Zagora.

== International career ==
=== Under 21 ===
On 4 September 2009, Baltanov scored his first goals for the Bulgaria U21, netting a brace in the 3:0 home win against Kazakhstan U21 in a UEFA European Under-21 Championship qualifier. Baltanov was the captain of the team.

=== Senior ===
In late January 2015, Baltanov received his first call-up to the full national side by new manager Ivaylo Petev for a friendly match against Romania. Baltanov made a debut on 7 February during the 0–0 draw with Romania.

== Career statistics ==
As of 15 December 2019

Club	Division	Season	League		Cup / Supercup		Europe		Total	
Club	Division	Season	Apps	Goals	Apps	Goals	Apps	Goals	Apps	Goals
Levski Sofia	A Group	2004–05	2	0	0	0	0	0	2	0
Levski Sofia	A Group	2005–06	1	0	1	0	0	0	2	0
Levski Sofia	A Group	2006–07	2	0	0	0	1	0	3	0
Levski Sofia	A Group	2007–08	9	0	1	0	0	0	10	0
Levski Sofia	A Group	2008–09	15	0	2	0	1	0	18	0
Levski Sofia	A Group	2009–10	11	1	0	0	3	0	14	1
Levski Sofia	A Group	2010–11	3	0	1	0	6	0	10	0
Kaliakra Kavarna (loan)	A Group	2010–11	8	0	0	0	–		8	0
Levski Sofia	A Group	2011–12	8	0	0	0	0	0	8	0
Botev Vratsa (loan)	A Group	2011–12	12	2	0	0	–		12	2
Chernomorets Burgas	A Group	2012–13	16	3	2	0	–		18	3
Chernomorets Burgas	A Group	2013–14	29	6	2	1	–		31	7
Botev Plovdiv	A Group	2014–15	25	7	3	0	0	0	28	7
Botev Plovdiv	A Group	2015–16	30	7	1	2	–		31	9
Botev Plovdiv	First League	2016–17	15	2	4	1	–		19	3
Botev Plovdiv	First League	2017–18	31	5	6	2	5	1	42	8
Botev Plovdiv	First League	2018–19	33	2	5	3	–		38	5
Botev Plovdiv	First League	2019–20	18	2	1	0	–		19	2
Career totals			268	37	29	9	16	1	313	47

== Honours ==
Levski Sofia

- Bulgarian A Group: 2006, 2007, 2009
- Bulgarian Cup: 2007
- Bulgarian Supercup: 2005, 2007, 2009

Botev Plovdiv

- Bulgarian Cup: 2017, 2024
- Bulgarian Supercup: 2017
