= Radoslav Terziev =

Bulgarian footballer (born 1994)

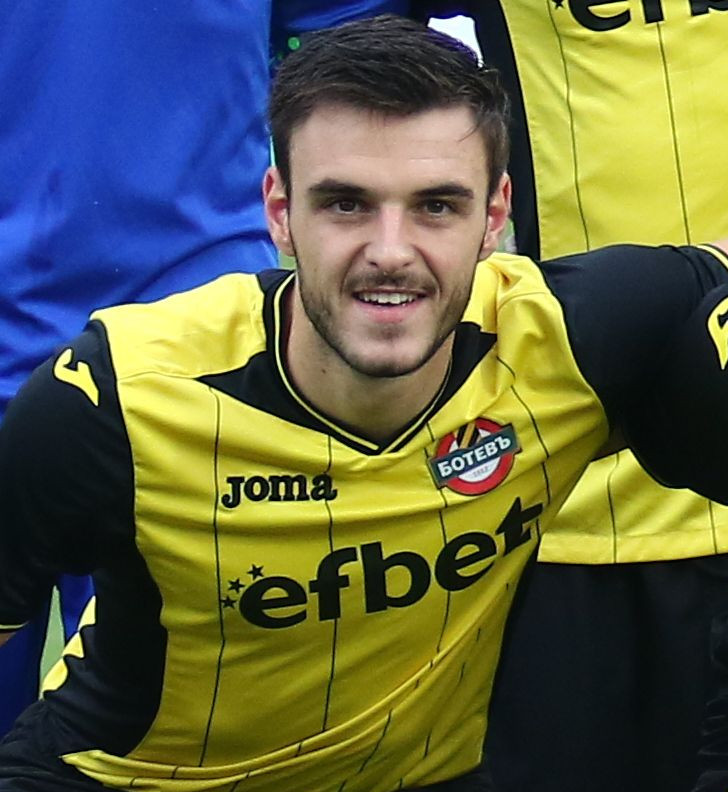

Personal information
- Full name: Radoslav Galinov Terziev
- Date of birth: 6 August 1994 (age 32)
- Place of birth: Plovdiv, Bulgaria
- Height: 1.79 m (5 ft 10 1/2 in)
- Position: Centre back

Team information
- Current team: Gigant Saedinenie
- Number: 24

Youth career
- –2011: Spartak Plovdiv
- 2012–2013: Botev Plovdiv

Senior career*
Years	Team	Apps	(Gls)
2010–2011	Spartak Plovdiv	1	(0)
2012–2020	Botev Plovdiv	144	(3)
2013–2014	→ Rakovski (loan)	35	(1)
2020	Slavia Sofia	9	(0)
2021	Montana	13	(0)
2021–2022	Hebar	32	(0)
2022	Etar Veliko Tarnovo	15	(0)
2023	Krumovgrad	8	(0)
2024	Spartak Varna	10	(0)
2024	Hebar	15	(0)
2025	Peyia 2014	8	(0)
2025	Sportist Svoge	10	(0)
2026–	Gigant Saedinenie	0	(0)

International career
2012–2013	Bulgaria U19	4	(0)
2015–2016	Bulgaria U21	12	(0)
- * Club domestic league appearances and goals as of 14 January 2026

Radoslav Terziev (Bulgarian: Радослав Терзиев; born 6 August 1994) is a Bulgarian professional footballer who plays as a defender for Gigant Saedinenie.

== Career ==
=== Early career ===
Born in Plovdiv, Terziev began his career at the Spartak Plovdiv academy but moved to Botev Plovdiv along with Lazar Marin, Lachezar Angelov and Rosen Andonov in January 2012. He then spent one and a half seasons on loan at second-tier Rakovski. He scored his first goal in senior football in a 3–0 win over Akademik Svishtov on 10 November 2013. Terziev totalled 39 appearances in all competitions for Rakovski.

=== Botev Plovdiv ===
After returning from his loan spell, Terziev made his Botev debut on 3 July 2014, in a 4–0 win over Libertas in the first leg of the first qualifying round of the UEFA Europa League. He played the full 90 minutes. Terziev made his A Group debut in a 1–0 home win against Lokomotiv Sofia on 20 July, appearing as a 69th-minute substitute for Milen Gamakov. One month later, he made his first league start in a game against Slavia Sofia.

During the second half of season 2015–16, Terziev became a regular central defender in the starting lineup of Botev Plovdiv.

On 22 October 2016, Terziev scored a goal after an assistance from Todor Nedelev during the 2–3 home defeat from Cherno More Varna.

On 24 May 2017, Terziev played an important role in the historical 2–1 win over Ludogorets Razgrad in the Bulgarian Cup final and won the cup with Botev Plovdiv.

On 16 June 2017, he signed a new two-year contract.

== International career ==
=== Under 21 ===
As one of the most promising defenders Terziev has received call-ups for the Bulgarian U19 and U21 national football teams. On 31 March 2015, he participated in the 1–3 away defeat of Bulgaria U21 from Wales U21. On 9 June 2015, Terziev played 90 minutes during the 1–0 win in a friendly game with Cyprus U21.

In September 2015, Terziev was again included in the squad during the 0–2 away victory over Romania U21 and the 3–0 home win over Luxembourg U21. He played 90 minutes in both games.

On 9 October 2015, Terziev played 90 minutes during the 2–0 win over Armenia U21. Five days later, on 14 October, Terziev was again in the starting lineup but this time he and his teammates were defeated with 0–1 by Denmark U21.

On 25 March 2016, Terziev was in the starting lineup for the goal-less draw with Wales U21.

On 21 May 2016, Terziev was in the starting lineup during the 0–1 defeat from France U21.

=== Senior ===
In late January 2015, Terziev received his first call-up to the full national side by new manager Ivaylo Petev for a friendly match against Romania but he remained an unused substitute in this game. He was also part of Petar Houbchev's preliminary list for a November 2016 World Cup qualifier against Belarus, but did not make the final squad for the match.

== Career statistics ==
=== Club ===
As of 16 February 2019

Club performance			League		Cup		Continental		Other		Total	
Club	League	Season	Apps	Goals	Apps	Goals	Apps	Goals	Apps	Goals	Apps	Goals
Bulgaria			League		Cup		Europe		Other (Note: Includes Bulgarian Supercup matches.)		Total	
Spartak Plovdiv	B Group	2010–11	1	0	0	0	–		–		1	0
Spartak Plovdiv	Total		1	0	0	0	0	0	0	0	1	0
Botev Plovdiv	B Group	2011–12	0	0	0	0	–		–		0	0
Rakovski (loan)	B Group	2012–13	11	0	0	0	–		–		11	0
Rakovski (loan)	B Group	2013–14	24	1	4	0	–		–		28	1
Rakovski (loan)	Total		35	1	4	0	0	0	0	0	39	1
Botev Plovdiv	A Group	2014–15	17	0	1	0	2	0	0	0	20	0
Botev Plovdiv	A Group	2015–16	19	0	0	0	–		–		19	0
Botev Plovdiv	First League	2016–17	30	1	6	1	–		–		36	2
Botev Plovdiv	First League	2017–18	30	1	5	0	0	0	0	0	35	1
Botev Plovdiv	First League	2018–19	16	0	2	0	0	0	0	0	18	0
Botev Plovdiv	Total		112	2	14	1	2	0	0	0	128	3
Career Total			148	3	18	1	2	0	0	0	168	4

== Honours ==
Botev Plovdiv

- Bulgarian Cup: 2016–17
- Bulgarian Supercup: 2017
