= Viktor Genev =

Bulgarian footballer

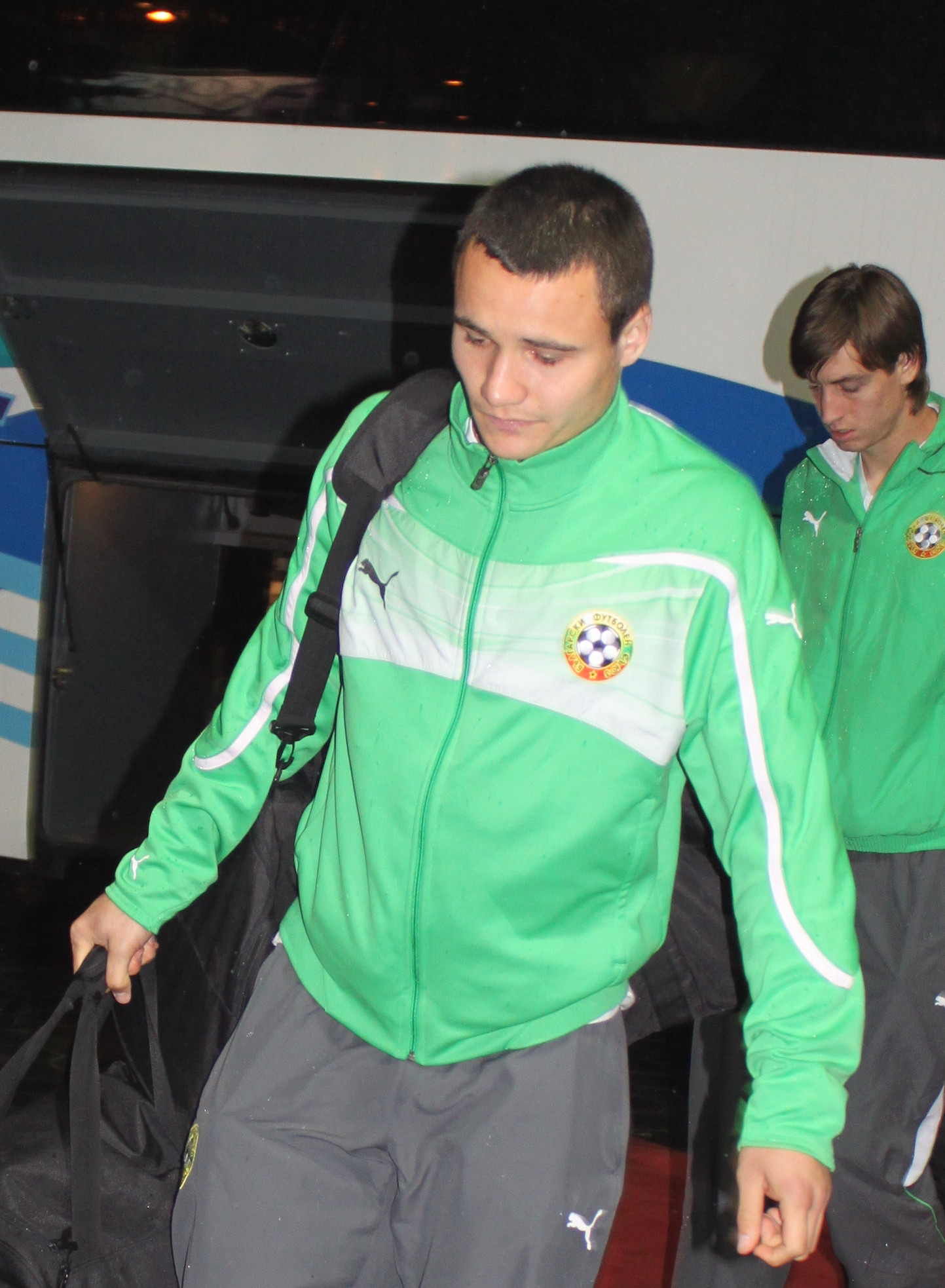
- Genev with Bulgaria in 2010

Personal information
- Full name: Viktor Viktorov Genev
- Date of birth: 27 October 1988 (age 38)
- Place of birth: Sofia, Bulgaria
- Height: 1.88 m (6 ft 2 in)
- Position: Centre back

Team information
- Current team: Rilski Sportist
- Number: 44

Youth career
- Levski Sofia

Senior career*
Years	Team	Apps	(Gls)
2007–2010	Levski Sofia	22	(0)
2007	→ Montana (loan)	14	(0)
2010–2013	Slavia Sofia	59	(3)
2011	→ Krylia Sovetov (loan)	4	(0)
2012	→ Oleksandriya (loan)	9	(2)
2014	Spartak Semey	29	(1)
2015	St Mirren	6	(0)
2015	Petrolul Ploiești	12	(0)
2016	Dinamo Minsk	2	(0)
2016	Levski Sofia	4	(0)
2017	Botev Plovdiv	13	(0)
2017–2018	Ashdod	21	(1)
2018–2019	Cherno More	20	(2)
2019–2020	Beroe	7	(0)
2020–2023	Botev Plovdiv	90	(5)
2023–2025	Slavia Sofia	57	(4)
2025–	Rilski Sportist	31	(4)

International career
2008–2009	Bulgaria U21	12	(1)
- * Club domestic league appearances and goals as of 8 June 2026

Viktor Viktorov Genev (Bulgarian: Виктор Викторов Генев; born 27 October 1988) is a Bulgarian professional footballer who plays as a defender for Rilski Sportist Samokov.

== Club career ==
=== Levski Sofia ===
==== 2007–2008 ====
During the first half of the 2007–2008 season, Genev played for Montana on loan.

He made his official debut for Levski Sofia on 19 March 2008 in a match against Lokomotiv Plovdiv, which Levski lost 1–0.

==== 2008–2009 ====
Apart from the 2007–2008 season, during 2008–2009 Genev started playing often for the first team wearing the kit with number 2. He also played for the Bulgaria national football team under 21 as a defender.

He became a Champion of Bulgaria in 2009.

==== 2009–2010 ====
On 15 July 2009, Victor made his debut in Europe for the first official match for Levski during the 2009–2010 season. The event took place in the 2nd qualifying round of the UEFA Champions League, when Levski encountered UE Sant Julià. The match ended 4–0 with a home win for The Blues.

=== Slavia Sofia ===
On 23 June 2010, Genev signed a contract with Slavia Sofia for an undisclosed transfer fee.

=== Spartak Semey ===
Genev joined newly promoted Kazakhstan Premier League club Spartak Semey in January 2014 for a period of one year. He made his official debut on 15 March, in the 2–1 away loss against FC Tobol in a league match and scored his first goal for the Semey club in the 2–1 win over the same opponent on 3 August.

=== St Mirren ===
On 26 February 2015, Genev signed for Scottish Premiership club St Mirren for the remainder of the season, following a successful trial. He made his debut two days after signing, in a 1–0 home win against Hamilton Academical. Genev left the club when his contract expired, following Saints relegation to the Scottish Championship.

=== Petrolul Ploiești ===
On 7 September 2015, Genev joined Romanian side FC Petrolul Ploiești on a one-year contract.

=== Dinamo Minsk ===
Genev had a short stint in the Belarusian Premier League with Dinamo Minsk between February and July 2016.

=== Botev Plovdiv ===
==== 2016–17 ====
On 6 February 2017, Genev signed with Botev Plovdiv until the end of the season. He made an official debut on 18 February during the 0–1 away win over Lokomotiv Gorna Oryahovitsa.

On 24 May 2017 Genev played an important role in the historical 2–1 win over Ludogorets Razgrad in the Bulgarian Cup final and won the cup with Botev Plovdiv.

==== 2017–18 ====
Viktor Genev played in all 6 games for Botev Plovdiv during the participation of the club in UEFA Europa League. On 9 August 2017 he scored a penalty during the penalty shootout and Botev Plovdiv defeated Ludogorets Razgrad and won the Bulgarian Supercup. Shortly after winning the Supercup, on 23 August, Viktor Genev left Botev Plovdiv on a mutual agreement because he received a better offer from F.C. Ashdod in Israel. Genev played 28 games in all competitions for Botev Plovdiv.

=== Slavia Sofia ===
In June 2023, Genev returned to Slavia Sofia.

== Honours ==
=== Club ===
Levski Sofia

- Bulgarian A Group: 2008–09
- Bulgarian Supercup: 2007, 2009

Botev Plovdiv

- Bulgarian Cup: 2016–17
- Bulgarian Supercup: 2017
