= Fernando Viana =

Brazilian footballer (born 1992)

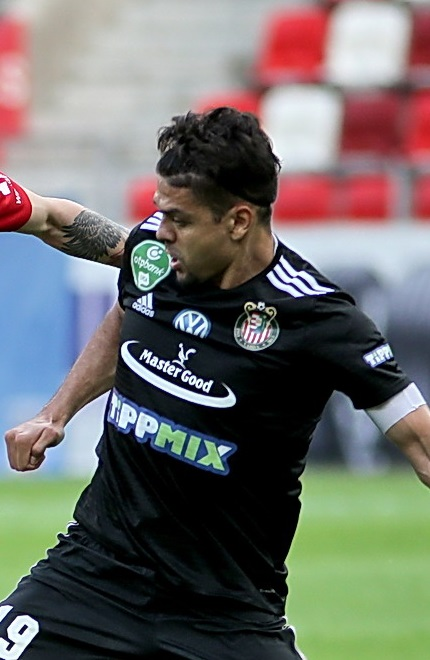
- Fernando Viana playing for Kisvárda in 2020

Personal information
- Full name: Fernando Viana Jardim Silva
- Date of birth: 20 February 1992 (age 34)
- Place of birth: Brasília, Brazil
- Height: 1.77 m (5 ft 10 in)
- Position: Forward

Team information
- Current team: Anápolis

Youth career
- 2007–2011: Atlético Mineiro

Senior career*
Years	Team	Apps	(Gls)
2012	Morrinhos	0	(0)
2012–2016	Joinville	59	(14)
2015	→ Paraná (loan)	17	(3)
2016	→ Ituano (loan)	0	(0)
2017	Botev Plovdiv	31	(15)
2018	Al Dhafra	11	(0)
2018	Suwon	15	(6)
2019	→ Guarani (loan)	13	(0)
2019	Botev Plovdiv	15	(4)
2020–2021	Kisvárda	44	(9)
2021–2022	Újpest	20	(1)
2022–2013	Criciúma	10	(0)
2023	Santo André	6	(0)
2023–2024	Samut Prakan City	27	(12)
2024–2025	Police Tero	22	(9)
2026	Centro Oeste	6	(3)
2026–	Anápolis	11	(3)
- * Club domestic league appearances and goals as of 11 November 2026

Fernando Viana Jardim Silva (born February 20, 1992), known as Fernando Viana, is a Brazilian footballer who plays as a forward for Anápolis.

== Career ==
=== Botev Plovdiv ===
==== 2016–17 ====
Fernando Viana joined Botev Plovdiv in January 2017. He made an impressive official debut on 18 February by securing the 0–1 away win over Lokomotiv Gorna Oryahovitsa. On 6 March he scored twice for the 2–0 home win in the derby game with Beroe Stara Zagora.

==== 2017–18 ====
On 20 July Fernando Viana scored a goal during the 4–0 win over Beitar Jerusalem in the 2nd qualifying round of UEFA Europa League. A few days later, on 23 July, Viana scored twice for 2–3 away win over Slavia Sofia. On 25 August Viana scored for the 1–1 draw against Etar Veliko Turnovo. On 12 October 2017 Fernando Viana scored 4 goals during the 5–0 home victory over FC Septemvri and became the first ever foreigner with such achievement in an official match for Botev Plovdiv.

=== Guarani FC ===
In the beginning of January 2019, Viana joined Guarani FC.

=== Return to Botev ===
Viana rejoined Botev Plovdiv in August 2019 on a contract for 4 months with the option for an 18-month extension. He left the team in January 2020.

== Career statistics ==
As of 12 June 2025

Appearances and goals by club, season and competition
Club	Season	League			State League		Cup		League Cup		Continental		Other		Total	
Club	Season	Division	Apps	Goals	Apps	Goals	Apps	Goals	Apps	Goals	Apps	Goals	Apps	Goals	Apps	Goals
Morrinhos	2012	Campeonato Goiano	0	0	1	0	0	0	—		—		—		1	0
Joinville	2012	Série B	4	0	0	0	—		—		—		—		4	0
Joinville	2013	Série B	4	1	1	0	—		—		—		—		5	1
Joinville	2014	Série B	17	5	10	2	2	0	—		—		—		29	7
Joinville	2015	Série A	11	1	14	2	1	0	—		—		—		26	3
Joinville	2016	Série B	23	7	0	0	2	0	—		—		—		25	7
Joinville	Total		59	14	25	4	5	0	—		—		—		89	18
Paraná (loan)	2015	Série B	17	3	—		—		—		—		—		17	3
Ituano (loan)	2016	Série D	—		10	0	—		—		—		—		10	0
Botev Plovdiv	2016–17	First League	13	6	—		4	0	—		—		—		17	6
Botev Plovdiv	2017–18	First League	18	9	—		2	2	—		3	1	1 (Note: Bulgarian Supercup match.)	0	24	12
Botev Plovdiv	Total		31	15	—		6	2	—		3	1	1	0	41	18
Al Dhafra	2017–18	UAE Pro League	11	0	—		1	0	—		—		—		12	0
Suwon FC	2018	K League 2	15	6	—		—		—		—		—		15	6
Guarani (loan)	2019	Série B	1	0	11	0	1	0	—		—		—		13	0
Botev Plovdiv	2019–20	First League	14	4	—		2	2	—		—		—		16	6
Kisvárda	2019–20	NB I	15	4	—		—		—		—		—		15	4
Kisvárda	2020–21	NB I	27	4	—		2	1	—		—		—		29	5
Kisvárda	Total		42	8	—		2	1	—		—		—		44	9
Újpest	2021–22	NB I	18	1	—		4	0	—		1	0	—		23	1
Criciúma	2022	Série B	10	0	—		—		—		—		—		10	0
Santo André	2023	Campeonato Paulista	—		6	0	—		—		—		—		6	0
Samut Prakan City	2023–24	Thai League 2	28	12	—		2	1	1	0	—		—		31	13
Police Tero	2024–25	Thai League 2	22	9	—		—		1	1	—		—		23	10
Career total			267	62	53	4	23	6	2	1	4	1	1	0	351	84

== Honours ==
Botev Plovdiv

- Bulgarian Cup: 2016–17
- Bulgarian Supercup: 2017
