= 2017 Bulgarian Supercup =

Финал за Суперкупата на България 2017
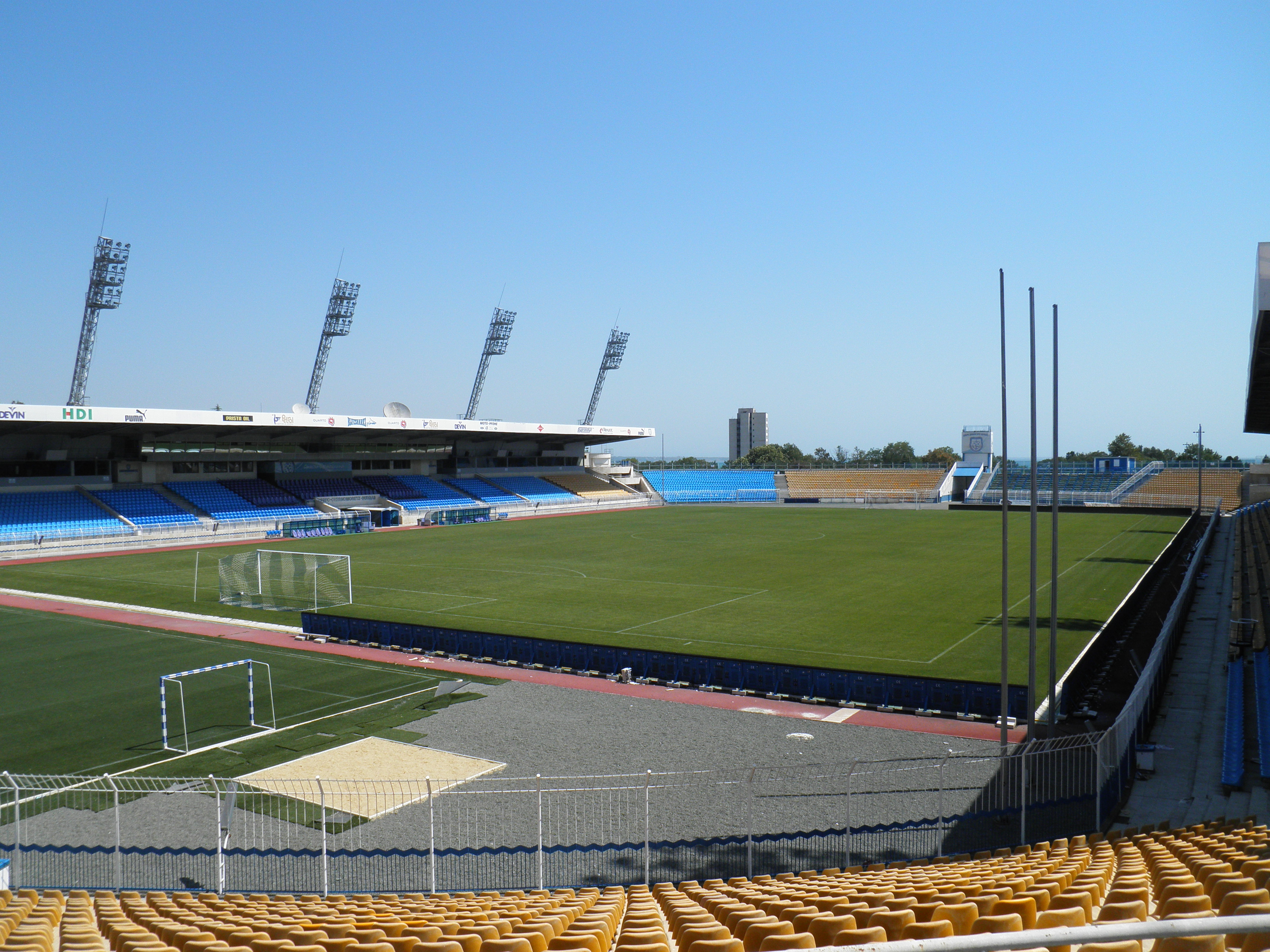
Ludogorets	Botev Plovdiv
First League	Bulgarian Cup
1	1
- Botev won 5–4 on penalties
- Date: 9 August 2017
- Venue: Lazur, Burgas
- Referee: Stanislav Todorov (Shumen)
- Attendance: 1,830
- Weather: Clear; 24 °C (75 °F)

The 2017 Bulgarian Supercup was the 14th Bulgarian Supercup, an annual Bulgarian football match played between the winners of the previous season's First Professional Football League and Bulgarian Cup. The game was played between the champions of the 2016-17 First League, Ludogorets Razgrad, and the 2017 Bulgarian Cup winners, Botev Plovdiv.

This was Ludogorets's fifth Bulgarian Supercup appearance and Botev's second. Both teams already competed against each other for the 2014 Supercup final which ended with a 3−1 victory for Ludogorets. The 2017 game ended 1−1 in regular time and after 5−4 on penalties Botev clinched their first Supercup win.

== Match details ==
9 August 2017
20:00 EEST

Ludogorets Razgrad	1–1	Botev Plovdiv
Wanderson 47'	Report	Nedelev 16'
Penalties
Marcelinho (penalty missed); Wanderson (penalty scored); Natanael (penalty scored); Anicet (penalty scored); Moți (penalty scored)	4–5	(penalty scored) Baltanov; (penalty scored) Viana; (penalty scored) Genev; (penalty scored) Brisola; (penalty scored) Dimov

Lazur Stadium, Burgas
Attendance: 1,830
Referee: Stanislav Todorov (Shumen)

Ludogorets	Botev

GK	1	(Argentina) Jorge Broun
RB	4	(Brazil) Cicinho
CB	32	(Ukraine) Ihor Plastun
CB	30	(Romania) Cosmin Moți
LB	6	(Brazil) Natanael	(yellow card) 38'
CM	12	(Madagascar) Anicet Abel
CM	18	(Bulgaria) Svetoslav Dyakov (c)	(yellow card) 60'
RW	88	(Brazil) Wanderson
AM	84	(Bulgaria) Marcelinho
LW	93	(Netherlands) Virgil Misidjan		(substituted off) 74'
CF	28	(Romania) Claudiu Keșerü	(yellow card) 25'	(substituted off) 77'
Substitutes:
GK	33	(Brazil) Renan dos Santos
DF	5	(Bulgaria) Georgi Terziev
MF	8	(Brazil) Lucas Sasha
MF	10	(Brazil) Gustavo Campanharo
FW	11	(Brazil) Juninho Quixadá		(substituted on) 77'
FW	37	(Brazil) João Paulo		(substituted on) 74'
MF	44	(Poland) Jacek Góralski
Manager:
(Bulgaria) Georgi Dermendzhiev

GK	22	(Poland) Daniel Kajzer
RB	2	(Bulgaria) Tsvetomir Panov
CB	70	(Bulgaria) Plamen Dimov	(yellow card) 12'
CB	4	(Bulgaria) Viktor Genev
LB	24	(Bulgaria) Lazar Marin
CM	10	(Bulgaria) Serkan Yusein		(substituted off) 61'
CM	7	(Brazil) Felipe Brisola	(yellow card) 38'
RM	17	(Bulgaria) Lachezar Baltanov (c)
AM	8	(Bulgaria) Todor Nedelev		(substituted off) 85'
LM	11	(Bulgaria) Toni Tasev		(substituted off) 46'
CF	9	(Brazil) Fernando Viana
Substitutes:
GK	99	(Bulgaria) Ivan Čvorović
MF	6	(Brazil) Álvaro Juliano		(substituted on) 85'
MF	14	(Ivory Coast) Yaya Meledje	(yellow card) 70'	(substituted on) 46'
DF	18	(Bulgaria) Radoslav Terziev
DF	25	(Bulgaria) Krum Stoyanov		(substituted on) 61'
MF	26	(Bulgaria) Radoslav Apostolov
FW	79	(Bulgaria) Kristian Dobrev
Manager:
(Bulgaria) Nikolay Kirov

MATCH OFFICIALS

- Assistant referees:
  - Diyan Valkov (Varna)
  - Ivo Kolev (Sofia)
- Fourth official: Nikola Popov (Sofia)

MATCH RULES

- 90 minutes.
- Penalty shoot-out if scores still level.
- Seven named substitutes, of which three may be used
