= Álvaro Juliano =

Brazilian footballer

Personal information
- Full name: Álvaro Juliano Ongilio
- Date of birth: 6 June 1991 (age 35)
- Place of birth: Ribeirão Preto, Brazil
- Height: 1.78 m (5 ft 10 in)
- Position: Midfielder

Team information
- Current team: Acireale
- Number: 35

Senior career*
Years	Team	Apps	(Gls)
2012–2013	Botafogo (SP)	13	(0)
2014	Monte Azul	13	(0)
2015	Batatais	18	(2)
2015	CRAC	9	(2)
2016–2017	Caldense	18	(1)
2017	Olímpia	3	(0)
2017–2018	Botev Plovdiv	16	(1)
2018–2019	Catanzaro	28	(2)
2019–2021	Potenza	32	(0)
2020	→ Catanzaro (loan)	7	(0)
2021	→ Monopoli (loan)	11	(0)
2021–2022	Viterbese	20	(2)
2022–2023	Paganese	30	(0)
2023–2024	Vibonese	6	(0)
2024	Licata	9	(0)
2024–	Acireale	20	(1)
- * Club domestic league appearances and goals as of 22 February 2026

Álvaro Juliano Ongilio (born 6 June 1991), sometimes known as just Álvaro, is a Brazilian footballer who plays as midfielder for Italian Serie D club Acireale.

== Career ==
On 6 June 2017, Álvaro Juliano signed a two-year contract with Bulgarian club Botev Plovdiv. On 6 July Álvaro made an official debut during the 1–0 win over Partizani Tirana in the 1st qualifying round of UEFA Europa League.

Álvaro Juliano scored his first goal for Botev Plovdiv on 21 September with a spectacular long shot during the 3–1 away victory in the 1/16 final of the Bulgarian Cup against Lokomotiv Gorna Oryahovitsa.

On 7 August 2018, he signed a one-year contract with Catanzaro.

On 1 July 2019, he joined Potenza on a two-year contract. On 31 January 2020, he returned on loan to Catanzaro until 30 June 2020. On 1 February 2021, he was loaned to Monopoli. On 28 August 2021, his contract with Potenza was terminated by mutual consent.

On 2 November 2021, he signed with Viterbese.

On 5 August 2022, Juliano moved to Paganese in Serie D.

== Career statistics ==
As of match played 12 December 2021

Appearances and goals by club, season and competition
Club	Season	League			State League		National cup		Continental		Other		Total	
Club	Season	Division	Apps	Goals	Apps	Goals	Apps	Goals	Apps	Goals	Apps	Goals	Apps	Goals
Botafogo (SP)	2012	Paulista	–		7	0	–		–		–		7	0
Botafogo (SP)	2013	Serie D	3	0	3	0	–		–		–		6	0
Botafogo (SP)	Total		3	0	10	0	0	0	0	0	0	0	13	0
Monte Azul	2014	Paulista 2	–		13	0	–		–		8 (Note: Appearance(s) in Copa Paulista)	1	21	1
Batatais	2015	Paulista 2	–		18	2	–		–		–		18	2
CRAC	2015	Serie D	9	2	–		–		–		–		9	2
Caldense	2016	Serie D	8	1	4	0	–		–		–		12	1
Caldense	2017	Mineiro	–		6	0	1	0	–		–		7	0
Caldense	Total		8	1	10	0	1	0	0	0	0	0	19	1
Olímpia	2017	Paulista 3	–		3	0	–		–		–		3	0
Botev Plovdiv	2017–18	First League	16	0	–		2	1	2 (Note: Appearance(s) in UEFA Europa League)	0	1 (Note: Appearance(s) in Bulgarian Supercup)	0	21	1
Catanzaro	2018–19	Serie C	29	2	–		–		–		–		29	2
Potenza	2019–20	Serie C	18	0	–		2	0	–		–		20	0
Potenza	2020–21	Serie C	14	0	–		1	0	–		–		15	0
Potenza	Total		32	0	0	0	3	0	0	0	0	0	35	0
Catanzaro (loan)	2019–20	Serie C	7	0	–		–		–		–		7	0
Monopoli (loan)	2020–21	Serie C	11	0	–		–		–		–		11	0
Viterbese	2021–22	Serie C	6	1	–		–		–		–		6	1
Career total			121	6	54	2	6	1	2	0	9	1	192	10

== Honours ==
Botev Plovdiv

- Bulgarian Supercup: 2017
