= Felipe Brisola =

Brazilian footballer (born 1990)

Personal information
- Full name: Felipe Bezerra Brisola
- Date of birth: 6 June 1990 (age 36)
- Place of birth: Roraima, Brazil
- Height: 1.70 m (5 ft 7 in)
- Position: Winger

Team information
- Current team: FC Hegelmann
- Number: 30

Senior career*
Years	Team	Apps	(Gls)
2011	Anapolina	18	(2)
2011–2014	Atlético Goianiense	13	(0)
2013	→ Vila Nova (loan)	4	(0)
2014–2015	Anapolina	16	(0)
2015	CRAC	2	(0)
2016	Itumbiara	14	(0)
2016–2018	Botev Plovdiv	55	(8)
2018–2021	Riga	80	(15)
2022–2023	Riteriai	23	(1)
2024–	Hegelmann	7	(0)
- * Club domestic league appearances and goals as of 7 November 2024

Felipe Bezerra Brisola (born 6 June 1990) is a Brazilian professional footballer who plays as a winger for A Lyga club Hegelmann.

== Career ==
=== In Brazil ===
Brisola started his professional career at Anapolina. In the first four months of 2011 he played 18 matches and scored two goals in 2011 Campeonato Goiano.

On 4 May 2011, Brisola signed a contract with Série A club Atlético Goianiense. He made his league debut as a substitute for Vitor Júnior in the 66th minute of a 1–0 win over Coritiba on 22 May. In 2013 Brisola joined Vila Nova on loan to gain first team experience.

In 2014 Brisola re-signed with Anapolina. In 2015 he moved to CRAC, playing only two games in the 2015 Campeonato Brasileiro Série D.

In December 2015, Brisola joined Itumbiara and made 14 appearances for the team during the 2016 Campeonato Goiano.

=== Botev Plovdiv ===
On 16 June 2016, Brisola joined Bulgarian First League club Botev Plovdiv. He made his debut on 30 July during a 1–1 draw against Lokomotiv Plovdiv. On 21 September, Brisola scored twice in a 6–3 away win over Pirin Gotse Delchev for the Bulgarian Cup. Three days later, he scored his first league goal for Botev in a 2–1 win over Dunav Ruse and won the award for man of the match.

On 6 July 2017, Brisola scored the only goal during a 1–0 win over Partizani Tirana in the 1st qualifying round of UEFA Europa League. On 20 July Brisola came on as a substitute and scored a goal in the final minutes during a 4–0 win over Beitar Jerusalem in the 2nd qualifying round of UEFA Europa League.

On 12 December Brisola scored a goal for a 5–0 win over Litex Lovech in the quarter final of the Bulgarian Cup.

He left the club at the end of the season when his contract was terminated by mutual consent.

== Career statistics ==
As of match played 9 November 2024

Appearances and goals by club, season and competition
Club	Season	League			State league		National cup (Note: Includes Copa do Brasil, Bulgarian Cup, Latvian Cup, Lithuanian Cup)		Continental		Other		Total	
Club	Season	Division	Apps	Goals	Apps	Goals	Apps	Goals	Apps	Goals	Apps	Goals	Apps	Goals
Anapolina	2011	Série D	0	0	18 (Note: Appearance(s) in Campeonato Goiano)	2	—		—		—		18	2
Atlético Goianiense	2011	Série A	5	0	0	0	0	0	—		—		5	0
Atlético Goianiense	2012	Série A	0	0	2	0	0	0	0	0	—		2	0
Atlético Goianiense	2013	Série B	1	0	0	0	0	0	—		—		1	0
Atlético Goianiense	2014	Série B	0	0	5	0	2	0	—		—		7	0
Atlético Goianiense	Total		6	0	7	0	2	0	0	0	—		15	0
Vila Nova (loan)	2013	Série C	4	0	0	0	—		—		—		4	0
Anapolina	2014	Série D	4	0	0	0	—		—		—		4	0
Anapolina	2015	—			12	0	2	0	—		—		14	0
Anapolina	Total		4	0	12	0	2	0	—		—		18	0
CRAC	2015	Série D	2	0	0	0	—		—		—		2	0
Itumbiara	2016	—			14	0	—		—		—		14	0
Botev Plovdiv	2016-17	Bulgarian First League	24	2	—		5	2	—		—		29	4
Botev Plovdiv	2017-18	Bulgarian First League	31	0	—		4	1	6 (Note: Appearance(s) in UEFA Europa League)	2	1 (Note: Appearance(s) in Bulgarian Supercup)	0	42	3
Botev Plovdiv	Total		55	2	—		9	3	6	2	1	0	71	7
Riga FC	2018	Virslīga	7	1	—		2	0	0	0	—		9	1
Riga FC	2019	Virslīga	23	5	—		1	1	7 (Note: One appearance in UEFA Champions League, Six appearances and one goal in UEFA Europa League)	1	—		31	7
Riga FC	2020	Virslīga	24	4	—		1	0	3 (Note: One appearance in UEFA Champions League, Two appearances in UEFA Europa League)	0	—		28	4
Riga FC	2021	Virslīga	26	5	—		2	1	8 (Note: Two appearances in UEFA Champions League, Six appearances in UEFA Europa Conference League)	0	—		36	6
Riga FC	Total		80	15	—		6	2	18	1	—		104	18
Riteriai	2022	A Lyga	11	1	—		1	0	—		—		12	1
Riteriai	2023	A Lyga	12	0	—		1	0	—		—		13	0
Riteriai	Total		23	1	—		2	0	—		—		25	1
Hegelmann	2024	A Lyga	7	0	—		2	0	—		—		9	0
Career total			181	18	51	2	23	5	24	3	1	0	280	28

== Honours ==
Botev Plovdiv

- Bulgarian Cup: 2016–17
- Bulgarian Supercup: 2017
