= Guido Abayián =

Argentine footballer (born 1989)

Personal information
- Full name: Guido Ezequiel Abayián
- Date of birth: June 24, 1989 (age 37)
- Place of birth: Neuquén, Argentina
- Height: 1.90 m (6 ft 3 in)
- Position: Forward

Team information
- Current team: Sambiase 2023

Youth career
- 2007–2008: Benfica

Senior career*
| Years | Team | Apps | (Gls) |
| 2008 | Atlético CP | 2 | (0) |
| 2008–2009 | Crato | 24 | (9) |
| 2009–2010 | Gimnasia La Plata | 0 | (0) |
| 2010–2011 | Unión de Sunchales | | |
| 2011–2012 | San Luis | 9 | (0) |
| 2012–2013 | Cerro Largo | 1 | (0) |
| 2013 | Bella Vista | 14 | (1) |
| 2013–2014 | Huracán | 7 | (0) |
| 2014–2015 | Cipolletti | 19 | (1) |
| 2015–2016 | Lincoln Red Imps | 10 | (18) |
| 2016 | Etar Veliko Tarnovo | 3 | (0) |
| 2017 | Atenas | 9 | (2) |
| 2017–2018 | Independiente de Neuquén | 19 | (1) |
| 2018–2019 | Cittanovese | 29 | (9) |
| 2019 | Savoia | 2 | (0) |
| 2020 | Città di Sant'Agata | 4 | (3) |
| 2020–2021 | Taranto | 10 | (1) |
| 2021 | FBC Gravina | 18 | (3) |
| 2021–2022 | Angri | 12 | (4) |
| 2022 | Pomigliano | | |
| 2022–2023 | Agropoli | | |
| 2023– | Sambiase 2023 | | |
- * Club domestic league appearances and goals as of 17:25, 1 August 2021 (UTC)

Guido Ezequiel Abayián (born 24 June 1989 in Neuquén) is an Argentine footballer who plays as a forward for Sambiase 2023 in Italian Eccellenza.

== Career ==
Abayián joined Italian club Calcio Cittanovese in September 2018. In the summer 2019, he joined another Italian club, U.S. Savoia 1908 in the Serie D. He left the club in December 2019.

In July 2020, Abayián then signed with Serie D club Città di Sant'Agata. On 9 December 2020, he moved on to Taranto. On 4 March 2021, Abayián joined FBC Gravina.
