= Kristian Dobrev (footballer, born 2001) =

Bulgarian footballer

Personal information
- Full name: Kristian Antonov Dobrev
- Date of birth: 27 April 2001 (age 25)
- Place of birth: Burgas, Bulgaria
- Height: 1.75 m (5 ft 9 in)
- Position: Forward

Team information
- Current team: Chernomorets Burgas
- Number: 11

Youth career
- –2014: Neftochimic Burgas
- 2014–2020: Botev Plovdiv
- 2019–2020: → Porto (loan)

Senior career*
Years	Team	Apps	(Gls)
2016–2021	Botev Plovdiv	63	(2)
2021	Botev Plovdiv II	7	(0)
2021–2024	Slavia Sofia	54	(4)
2024–2025	Rimini	2	(0)
2025	Krumovgrad	5	(0)
2025–	Chernomorets Burgas	39	(4)

International career^{‡}
2017–2019	Bulgaria U17	1	(0)
2018–2020	Bulgaria U18	3	(2)
2022–2023	Bulgaria U21	6	(0)
- * Club domestic league appearances and goals as of 11 June 2026 ‡ National team caps and goals as of 30 December 2025

Kristian Antonov Dobrev (Bulgarian: Кристиан Антонов Добрев; born 27 April 2001) is a Bulgarian footballer who plays as a forward for Chernomorets Burgas.

== Career ==
Kristian started his career in the youth ranks of his hometown club Neftochimic Burgas, but moved to Botev Plovdiv's academy in May 2014. On 26 November 2016, he made his professional debut in a 1–3 home defeat against Ludogorets Razgrad, coming on as substitute for Omar Kossoko.

Kris Dobrev scored his debut goal in an official game for Botev Plovdiv on 7 April 2017 during the 7–1 win over Montana. He became the youngest player to score a goal in Bulgarian First League, scoring at the age of 15 years and 345 days.

On 25 February 2019 Dobrev scored a goal during the 4–0 win over FC Vereya. He won the award for goal of the round. In August 2021, he joined Slavia Sofia.

On 13 July 2024, Dobrev signed a one-season contract with Rimini in Italian third-tier Serie C.

== Career statistics ==
=== Club ===
As of 2 August 2019

Club performance			League		Cup		Continental		Other		Total	
Club	League	Season	Apps	Goals	Apps	Goals	Apps	Goals	Apps	Goals	Apps	Goals
Bulgaria			League		Bulgarian Cup		Europe		Other (Note: Includes Bulgarian Supercup matches.)		Total	
Botev Plovdiv	First League	2016–17	4	1	0	0	–		–		4	1
Botev Plovdiv	First League	2017–18	5	0	1	0	0	0	0	0	6	0
Botev Plovdiv	First League	2018–19	25	1	5	0	–		–		30	1
Botev Plovdiv	First League	2019–20	3	0	0	0	–		–		3	0
Botev Plovdiv	Total		37	2	6	0	0	0	0	0	43	2
Career statistics			37	2	6	0	0	0	0	0	43	2

== Honours ==
=== Club ===
Botev Plovdiv

- Bulgarian Supercup: 2017

=== Individual ===
- Bulgarian First League debut of the year (1): 2016*

(*Jointly shared with Eyad Hammoud)
