= Todor Nedelev =

Bulgarian footballer (born 1993)

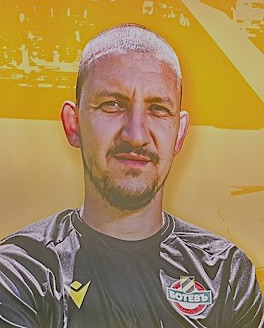

Personal information
- Full name: Todor Lyubchev Nedelev
- Date of birth: 7 February 1993 (age 33)
- Place of birth: Belozem, Bulgaria
- Height: 1.77 m (5 ft 10 in)
- Positions: Winger; attacking midfielder

Team information
- Current team: Botev Plovdiv
- Number: 8

Youth career
- 2004–2011: Botev 2002

Senior career*
Years	Team	Apps	(Gls)
2011–2013	Botev Plovdiv	73	(22)
2014–2015	Mainz 05 II	18	(2)
2014–2017	Mainz 05	2	(0)
2016–2017	→ Botev Plovdiv (loan)	45	(14)
2017–2023	Botev Plovdiv	143	(41)
2023–2026	Ludogorets Razgrad	29	(5)
2025–2026	→ Botev Plovdiv (loan)	28	(4)
2026–	Botev Plovdiv	0	(0)

International career^{‡}
2009–2010	Bulgaria U17	3	(1)
2011	Bulgaria U19	3	(2)
2012–2014	Bulgaria U21	2	(3)
2013–	Bulgaria	44	(5)
- * Club domestic league appearances and goals as of 11 June 2026 ‡ National team caps and goals as of 3 December 2023

Todor Lyubchev Nedelev (Bulgarian: Тодор Любчев Неделев; born 7 February 1993) is a Bulgarian professional footballer who plays as a winger or attacking midfielder for Botev Plovdiv.

== Early life ==
Nedelev was born on 7 February 1993, and raised in the village of Belozem, Plovdiv Province.

== Club career ==
=== Botev Plovdiv ===
Nedelev started to play football at his local club and then joined the Botev 2002 Academy in 2004 when he was discovered by the owner Mr. Andrey Pavlov. On 27 June 2011, Nedelev signed a professional contract with Botev Plovdiv. He made his first league appearance in Botev's 1–0 away win over Dobrudzha Dobrich on 13 August, coming on as a 70th-minute substitute. A week later he made his first start in a game versus Spartak Varna. On 3 September, Nedelev scored his first goal to secure a 1–1 draw against Chernomorets Pomorie. He finished his first season with 2 goals in 23 matches, as Botev clinched promotion to the A PFG.

On 11 August 2012, Nedelev marked his A PFG debut with a three assists for an Ivan Tsvetkov hat-trick in a 3–0 home win over Slavia Sofia. On 19 December, it was announced that Botev had renewed the contract of Nedelev, extending it until 31 December 2015. He ended his first season in A PFG with 9 goals and 12 assists.

Nedelev scored his first-ever European goals on 11 July 2013, scoring twice in a 5–0 home win over Astana in their first qualifying round-match of Europa League. He then scored two goals in Botev's 2–1 win over Levski Sofia on 21 July, in their opening game of the 2013–14 season in the domestic league.

=== Mainz 05 ===
On 1 September 2013, Nedelev signed a four-and-a-half-year contract with Mainz 05, joining the team on 1 January 2014. Nedelev made his official league debut on 25 March 2014, in the 1–3 away loss against Eintracht Braunschweig after coming on as a second-half substitute for Julian Koch.

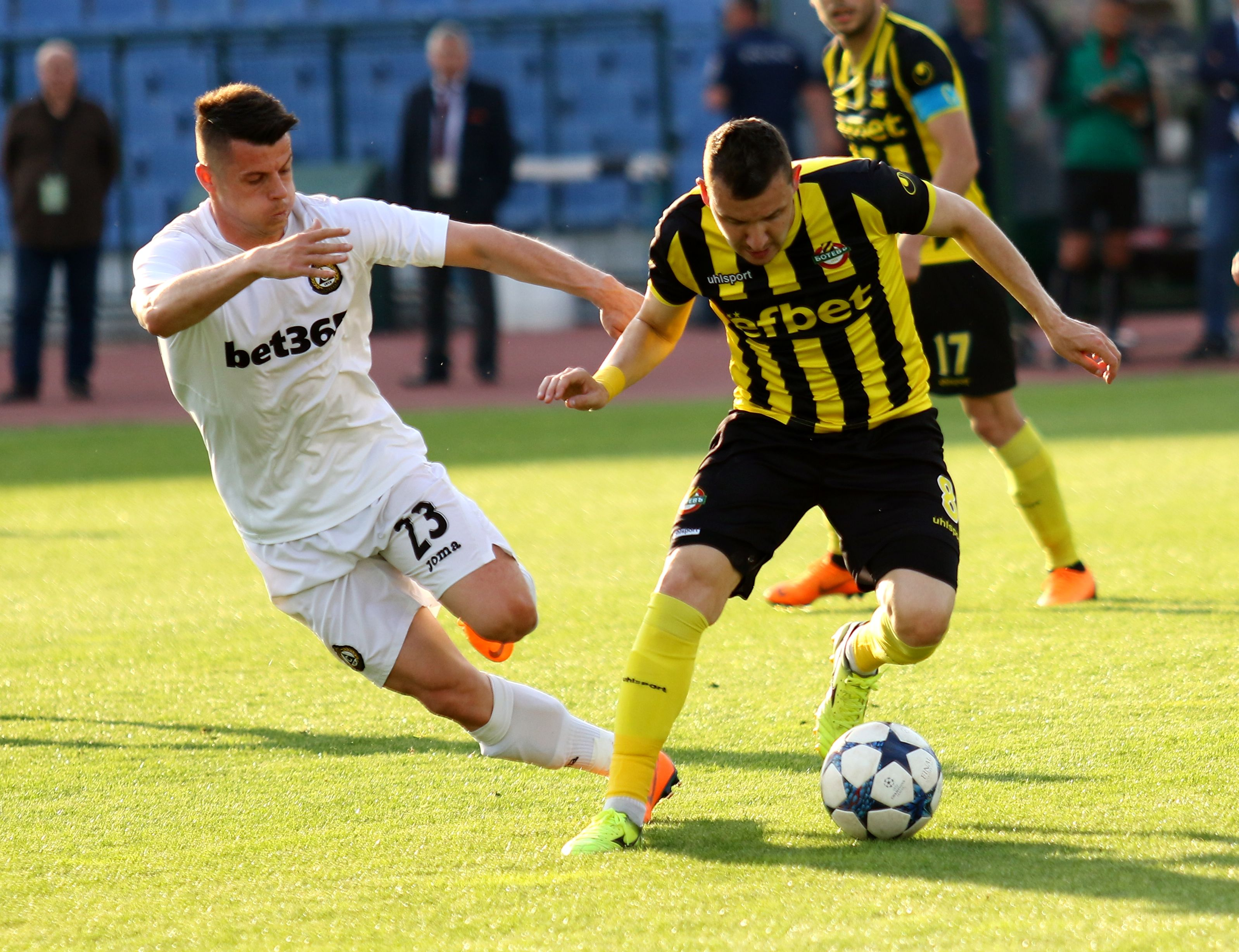

==== Loan to Botev Plovdiv ====
===== 2015-16 =====
After only two matches for the first team of Mainz, Nedelev was loaned until the end of season 2015–16. On 23 January 2016, he joined his previous club Botev Plovdiv in search of more playing time. Nedelev made his second debut for the team during 1–0 home win in the local derby match against Lokomotiv Plovdiv.

On 28 February, after almost two years since his last goal, Nedelev scored during the 2–2 draw of Botev Plovdiv with PFC Pirin Blagoevgrad and he was elected for "man of the match". On 16 April, Nedelev scored an injury-time equaliser during the 2–2 draw with PFC Montana. A couple of weeks later, on 29 April, Nedelev scored a goal from a direct free kick against FC Pirin Blagoevgrad. In the last game of the season, on 27 May 2016, Nedelev provided the assists for both goals during the 2–1 home win over the champions from Ludogorets Razgrad.

===== 2016-17 =====
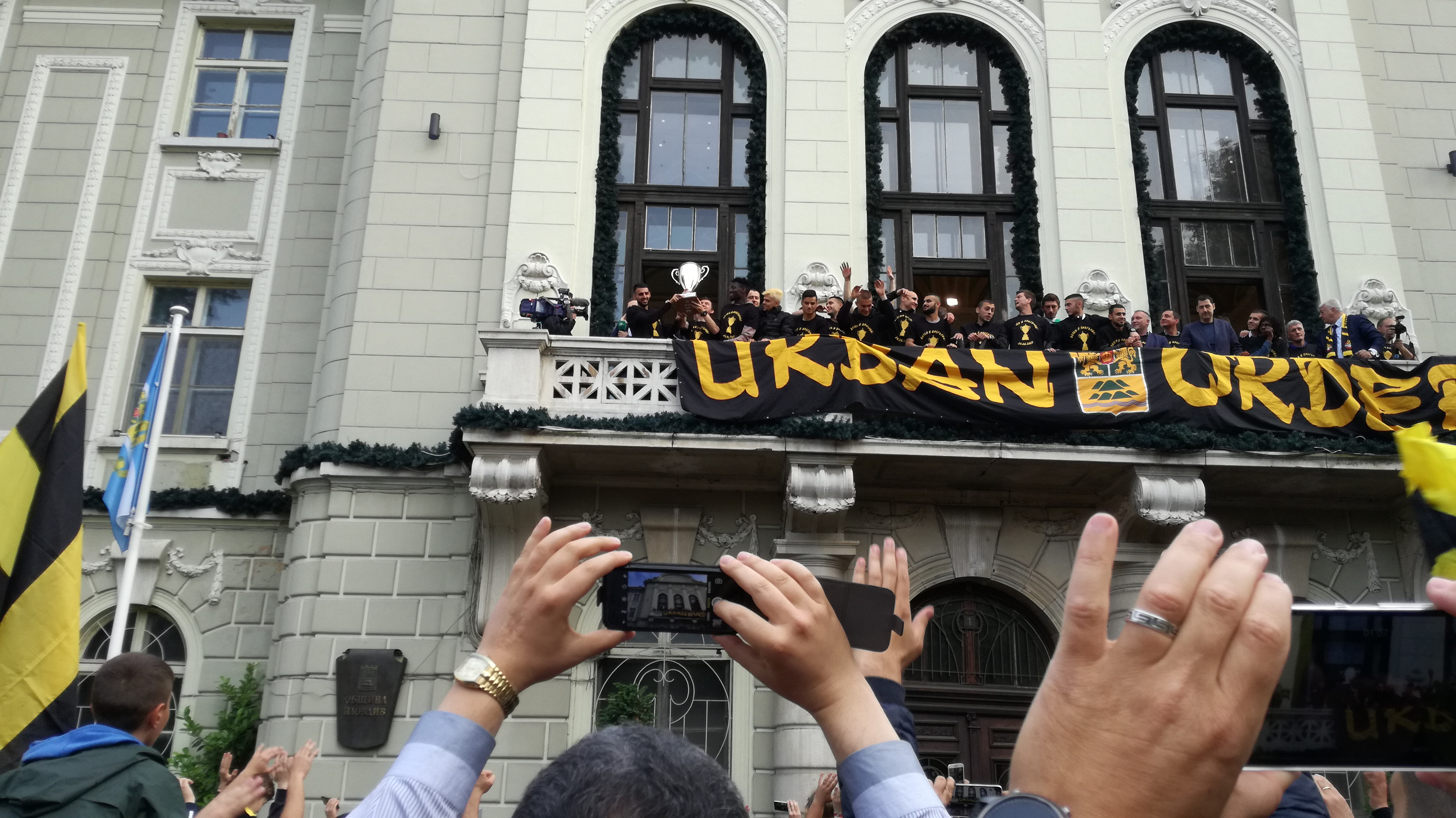
Todor Nedelev and his teammates from Botev Plovdiv celebrating winning the Bulgarian Football Cup in 2017

On 9 July 2016, Nedelev's loan was extended until 30 June 2017. On 15 August 2016, Nedelev scored twice for the 3–2 win over Slavia Sofia and was elected for "man of the match". On 27 August, Nedelev provided an assist for the first goal during the 2–1 home victory over PFC Neftochimic Burgas and again received the award for "man of the match". On 1 October, Nedelev was selected for "man of the match" during the 0–0 home draw with CSKA Sofia.

On 16 October 2016, Nedelev scored 2 goals during the tremendous 3–4 away win over Beroe Stara Zagora. Following his excellent performance, he won the award for the best player of 10th round of First Professional Football League (Bulgaria). In the next round, on 22 October, Nedelev made an assist for Radoslav Terziev goal during the 2–3 home defeat from Cherno More Varna.

On 30 October, Nedelev provided a phenomenal assist to João Paulo who scored in the 13th second of the 1–1 draw with Levski Sofia. In November and December 2016, Nedelev scored goals against Slavia Sofia, FC Vereya, and Pirin Blagoevgrad.

Nedelev started 2017 with assists during the 2–0 win over Beroe on 6 March and the 1–1 draw with Cherno More Varna on 11 March. On 31 March, Nedelev scored a penalty during the 2–0 win over PFC Montana. A few days later, on 8 April, Nedelev scored twice and made an assist during the 7–1 win over the same opponent.

On 19 April, Nedelev scored from a penalty kick in the final minute and Botev Plovdiv achieved a 0–1 away victory over FC Vereya in the first leg of the semi-finals of the Bulgarian Cup. On 24 May 2017 Botev Plovdiv achieved tremendous success by winning with 2–1 against Ludogorets Razgrad. Nedelev and his teammates lifted the Bulgarian Cup for the third time in the history of the club.

=== Permanent return to Botev ===
==== 2017-18 ====
On 22 June 2017, Nedelev moved to Botev Plovdiv permanently, signing a contract for 3 years with Mainz 05, keeping the right to take half or more from the next transfer fee of the player. On 29 June, Nedelev scored a goal for the 3–1 away win over Partizani Tirana in the 1st qualifying round of UEFA Europa League. On 20 July, he provided assists for two of the goals during the 4–0 win over Beitar Jerusalem in the 2nd qualifying round of UEFA Europa League. On 9 August, Nedelev scored a spectacular goal from a free kick against Ludogorets Razgrad, and a penalty shootout later, Botev Plovdiv won the Bulgarian Supercup for the first time in its history.

On 13 August, Nedelev scored a goal to secure the 1–1 away draw with Beroe Stara Zagora. He received the award for man of the match. On 10 September, Nedelev was the key player and scored a goal for the spectacular 2–1 win over PFC Levski Sofia. He again received the award for man of the match.

After missing a couple of games due to an injury, on 24 September, Nedelev returned in the starting lineup with an assist and a goal for the 3–0 win in the derby game against Lokomotiv Plovdiv. This game became known as the "silent derby" because due to a ban no supporters were allowed on the stadium. Once again, Nedelev earned the award for "man of the match" thanks to his extraordinary performance. On 27 October, Nedelev scored for 1–2 away win over Pirin Blagoevgrad and was selected for man of the match. On 18 November, Nedelev scored a penalty for the 1–1 away draw against CSKA Sofia. A week later, during his 100th appearance for Botev Plovdiv, Nedelev scored a penalty for the 1–1 away draw against Septemvri Sofia.

On 18 November, Nedelev scored a penalty during the first half of the 1–1 draw with CSKA Sofia. On 12 December, Nedelev scored a goal and provided 3 assists for the 5–0 win over Litex Lovech in the quarter-final of the Bulgarian Cup. On 12 March, the day when Botev Plovdiv celebrated 106 years from its foundation, Nedelev scored a goal for a dramatic 2–4 away win over FC Vereya. Later on during the same month, his goal against Dunav Ruse was voted as the best goal of the round in Parva Liga. On 6 April, Nedelev provided a wonderful assist for Steven Petkov who scored the winning goal for the 1–0 victory over Levski Sofia. On 11 May, Nedelev again made an amazing assist for the winning goal of João Paulo da Silva Araújo and Botev Plovdiv defeated Beroe Stara Zagora with 2–1.

==== 2018-19 ====
On 28 July 2018, Nedelev scored his first goal for the season for the 0–2 away win over Septemvri Sofia. On 3 August, Nedelev scored a penalty for the 2–0 home win over Etar Veliko Tarnovo. He was selected for "man of the match". On 25 August, Nedelev scored from a direct free kick during the 0–2 away win over FC Vitosha Bistritsa. He was again selected for "man of the match".

==== 2019-20 ====
Nedelev received the Instat index award for the best player of season 2019–20 in Parva Liga.

==== 2020-21 ====
During the opening round of Parva Liga, on 9 August 2020, Nedelev scored a goal, provided an assist and was selected the man of the match for the 2–0 home derby win over the local rivals Locomotiv Plovdiv. A week later, on 16 August, Nedevev provided an assist but this was not enough and Botev Plovdiv lost 2-1 the away visit to CSKA Sofia. On 23 August Nedelev scored twice for the dramatic 3–3 draw with Beroe Stara Zagora. He won once again the award for man of the match.

=== Ludogorets Razgrad ===
On 28 February 2023, the last day of the transfer window, Botev accepted the offer from Ludogorets Razgrad and Nedelev officially joined the club for 150 000 euros.

In a semi-final game for the Bulgarian Cup against Cherno More Varna that took place on 11 May 2023 he scored from a penalty in a penalty shootout that Ludogorets Razgrad won with a total score of 5-3 and reached the final.

Todor Nedelev scored his first goal in regular time for Ludogorets Razgrad on 15 May against Lokomotiv Plovdiv, which turned out to be the winning goal as the game finished 1:0 for Ludogorets Razgrad.

On 24 May 2023, Todor Nedelev won the Bulgarian Cup for a second time with Ludogorets Razgrad in a game in which he was a substitute. An interesting fact is that he won the other Bulgarian Cup exactly 6 years earlier - on 24 May 2017 with Botev Plovdiv.

== International career ==
Nedelev earned his first cap for Bulgaria (as a starter) on 15 August 2013 in the 0–2 away loss against Macedonia in a friendly match.

On 9 September 2014, Nedelev came in as a substitute in the 74th minute and made an assist from a corner kick for the winning goal of Ventsislav Hristov in the opening game of UEFA Euro 2016 qualifying Group H against Azerbaijan. Bulgaria achieved 2–1 victory away from home. On 6 October 2016, Nedelev came in as a substitute in the 75th minute during the 4–1 away defeat from the France national football team.

On 31 August 2017, Nedelev came in as a substitute during the historical 3–2 win over the Sweden men's national football team. On 7 October, Nedelev was in the starting lineup and despite losing with 0–1, he played well during the entire match against France. On 13 October 2018, Nedelev scored his first goal for the national team in a 2–1 home win against Cyprus. He started the attack for the first goal and scored the decisive second goal in a match for the 2018–19 UEFA Nations League.

On 10 June 2022 the bus of the national team crashed while taking the team to the hotel, before the match with Georgia national football team. Nedelev was the only one injured and had suffered a craniocerebral injury, undergoing surgery after that. Thanks to the fast reactions of the Bulgaria team doctor, his injury was brought under control and the player was expected to return in play in 3 to 6 months.

== Career statistics ==
=== Club ===
As of 7th of May 2026

Appearances and goals by club, season and competition
Club	Season	League			National cup		Europe		Other		Total	
Club	Season	Division	Apps	Goals	Apps	Goals	Apps	Goals	Apps	Goals	Apps	Goals
Botev Plovdiv	2011–12	Bulgarian Second League	23	2	2	0	–		–		25	2
Botev Plovdiv	2012–13	Bulgarian First League	29	9	1	0	–		–		30	9
Botev Plovdiv	2013–14	Bulgarian First League	11	5	1	0	6	3	–		18	8
Botev Plovdiv	Total		63	16	4	0	6	3	0	0	73	19
Mainz 05	2013–14	Bundesliga	2	0	0	0	–		–		2	0
Mainz 05 II	2013–14	Regionalliga Südwest	3	0	0	0	–		–		3	0
Mainz 05 II	2014–15	3. Liga	9	2	0	0	–		–		9	2
Mainz 05 II	2015–16	3. Liga	6	0	0	0	–		–		6	0
Mainz 05 II	Total		20	2	0	0	0	0	0	0	20	2
Botev Plovdiv (loan)	2015–16	Bulgarian First League	12	3	0	0	–		–		12	3
Botev Plovdiv (loan)	2016–17	Bulgarian First League	33	11	6	3	–		–		39	14
Botev Plovdiv (loan)	Total		45	14	6	3	0	0	0	0	51	17
Botev Plovdiv	2017–18	Bulgarian First League	33	9	4	1	5	1	1	1	43	12
Botev Plovdiv	2018–19	Bulgarian First League	35	14	6	2	–		–		41	16
Botev Plovdiv	2019–20	Bulgarian First League	30	9	5	2	–		–		35	11
Botev Plovdiv	2020–21	Bulgarian First League	12	3	1	0	–		–		13	3
Botev Plovdiv	2021–22	Bulgarian First League	30	6	0	0	–		–		30	6
Botev Plovdiv	2022–23	Bulgarian First League	3	0	0	0	–		–		3	0
Botev Plovdiv	Total		143	41	16	5	5	1	1	1	165	48
Ludogorets Razgrad	2022–23	Bulgarian First League	5	1	2	0	0	0	–		7	1
Ludogorets Razgrad	2023–24	Bulgarian First League	17	2	6	3	0	0	1	0	24	5
Ludogorets Razgrad	2024–25	Bulgarian First League	7	2	5	0	6	1	0	0	18	3
Ludogorets Razgrad II	2024–25	Bulgarian Second League	2	0	0	0	–		–		2	0
Ludogorets Razgrad	2025–26	Bulgarian First League	0	0	0	0	1	0	0	0	1	0
Ludogorets Razgrad	Total		31	5	13	3	7	1	1	0	52	9
Botev Plovdiv (loan)	2025–26	Bulgarian First League	28	4	2	0	–		–		30	4
Botev Plovdiv - career total			279	75	28	8	11	4	1	1	319	88
Career total			330	82	41	11	18	5	2	1	391	99

=== International ===
As of 9 June 2022

Appearances and goals by national team and year
National team	Year	Apps	Goals
Bulgaria	2013	3	0
Bulgaria	2014	3	0
Bulgaria	2015	4	0
Bulgaria	2016	1	0
Bulgaria	2017	3	0
Bulgaria	2018	7	1
Bulgaria	2019	6	1
Bulgaria	2020	6	0
Bulgaria	2021	6	3
Bulgaria	2022	5	0
Total		44	5

Scores and results list Bulgaria's goal tally first, score column indicates score after each Nedelev goal.

List of international goals scored by Todor Nedelev
No.	Date	Venue	Opponent	Score	Result	Competition
1	13 October 2018	Vasil Levski National Stadium, Sofia, Bulgaria	Cyprus	2–1	2–1	2018–19 UEFA Nations League C
2	22 March 2019	Vasil Levski National Stadium, Sofia, Bulgaria	Montenegro	1–1	1–1	UEFA Euro 2020 qualification
3	8 September 2021	Vasil Levski National Stadium, Sofia, Bulgaria	Georgia	1–0	4–1	Friendly
4	12 October 2021	Vasil Levski National Stadium, Sofia, Bulgaria	Northern Ireland	1–1	2–1	2022 FIFA World Cup qualification
5	12 October 2021	Vasil Levski National Stadium, Sofia, Bulgaria	Northern Ireland	2–1	2–1	2022 FIFA World Cup qualification

== Honours ==
Botev Plovdiv

- Bulgarian Cup: 2016–17
- Bulgarian Supercup: 2017

Ludogorets Razgrad

- Bulgarian First League: 2022–23, 2023-24
- Bulgarian Cup: 2022–23
- Bulgarian Supercup: 2023

Individual

- Best Young Player in Bulgaria: 2012–13
- Bulgarian Footballer of the Year Third place: 2017, 2018
- Best midfielder in the Bulgarian First League: 2019
- Special award "Trifon Ivanov" Lionheart: 2022
- Bulgarian First League Goal of the Week: 2021–22 (Week 24) v. CSKA Sofia
