= Daniel Kajzer =

Polish footballer

Personal information
- Full name: Daniel Kajzer
- Date of birth: 23 February 1992 (age 34)
- Place of birth: Tarnowskie Góry, Poland
- Height: 1.88 m (6 ft 2 in)
- Position: Goalkeeper

Team information
- Current team: Slavia Ruda Śląska

Youth career
- Slavia Ruda Śląska
- –2012: Górnik Zabrze

Senior career*
Years	Team	Apps	(Gls)
2012–2017	ROW Rybnik	103	(0)
2017–2019	Botev Plovdiv	46	(0)
2019–2020	Śląsk Wrocław	0	(0)
2019–2020	Śląsk Wrocław II	3	(0)
2020–2023	Arka Gdynia	59	(0)
2023–2025	Botev Plovdiv	7	(0)
2024–2025	Botev Plovdiv II	14	(0)
2025	Warta Poznań	8	(0)
2025–	Slavia Ruda Śląska	0	(0)
- * Club domestic league appearances and goals as of 18:21, 27 May 2025 (UTC)

Daniel Kajzer (born 23 February 1992) is a Polish professional footballer who plays as a goalkeeper for regional league club Slavia Ruda Śląska.

== Career ==
=== ROW Rybnik ===
Kajzer began his career with ROW Rybnik, making his senior debut in 2012. In the 2012–13 season, he helped the team achieve promotion to I liga. Kajzer made a total of 103 league appearances across five seasons with the club, keeping 28 clean sheets.

=== Botev Plovdiv ===
On 12 June 2017, after a successful trial period, Kajzer signed a two-year contract with Bulgarian club Botev Plovdiv. He made his debut in the 2017 Bulgarian Supercup against the champions Ludogorets. The match was decided and won by Botev on penalties, with Kajzer saving the first penalty shot from Marcelinho.

On 6 April 2018, Kajzer was included in the starting line-up and kept a clean sheet during a 1–0 win in a derby match against Levski Sofia.

On 29 April, Kajzer saved a penalty in the last minutes of a 2–1 home win over CSKA Sofia. His performance in the game was selected for save of the week.

On 24 April 2019, Botev faced CSKA Sofia in a second leg of the Bulgarian Cup semi-final. The match ended 3–3 at the "Bulgarian Army" stadium and sent Botev to the final. Kajzer was applauded for his efforts, saving a lot of chances in front of his goal and once again being one of Botev's most crucial players.

During his tenure with Botev, he became a notable figure among the club's supporters and the Bultras.

=== Arka Gdynia ===
After spending the 2019–20 season as a back-up with Śląsk Wrocław, making only one cup appearance, on 28 July 2020 he joined Arka Gdynia.

=== Return to Botev Plovdiv ===
On 27 June 2023, Kajzer returned to Botev Plovdiv, signing a two-year contract. He made a single Bulgarian Cup appearance that season, keeping a clean sheet in a 0–3 first round win over Strumska Slava on 8 November 2023. Botev went on to win the competition.

On 15 January 2025, after only appearing for the reserve team since the start of the 2024–25 season, Kajzer left the club.

=== Warta Poznań ===
On 9 February 2025, Kajzer joined Polish second-tier club Warta Poznań on a deal until June 2026, with an option to extend for another year. After Warta's relegation, he left the club by mutual consent in June 2025.

=== Slavia Ruda Śląska ===
On 5 September 2025, Kajzer returned to his childhood club Slavia Ruda Śląska.

== Career statistics ==
As of match played 11 May 2025

Appearances and goals by club, season and competition
Club	Season	League			National cup (Note: Includes Polish Cup, Bulgarian Cup)		Continental		Other		Total	
Club	Season	Division	Apps	Goals	Apps	Goals	Apps	Goals	Apps	Goals	Apps	Goals
ROW Rybnik	2012–13	II liga West	28	0	1	0	—		—		29	0
ROW Rybnik	2013–14	I liga	9	0	1	0	—		—		10	0
ROW Rybnik	2014–15	II liga	16	0	1	0	—		—		17	0
ROW Rybnik	2015–16	II liga	23	0	1	0	—		—		24	0
ROW Rybnik	2016–17	II liga	27	0	1	0	—		—		28	0
ROW Rybnik	Total		103	0	5	0	0	0	0	0	108	0
Botev Plovdiv	2017–18	First League	10	0	3	0	0	0	1 (Note: Appearance in Bulgarian Supercup)	0	14	0
Botev Plovdiv	2018–19	First League	36	0	5	0	—		—		41	0
Botev Plovdiv	Total		46	0	8	0	0	0	1	0	55	0
Śląsk Wrocław	2019–20	Ekstraklasa	0	0	1	0	—		—		1	0
Śląsk Wrocław II	2019–20	III liga, gr. III	3	0	—		—		—		3	0
Arka Gdynia	2020–21	I liga	34	0	0	0	—		1 (Note: Appearance in I liga promotion play-offs)	0	35	0
Arka Gdynia	2021–22	I liga	13	0	0	0	—		0	0	13	0
Arka Gdynia	2022–23	I liga	11	0	0	0	—		—		11	0
Arka Gdynia	Total		58	0	0	0	0	0	1	0	59	0
Botev Plovdiv	2023–24	First League	7	0	1	0	—		—		8	0
Botev Plovdiv II	2024–25	Second League	14	0	—		—		—		14	0
Warta Poznań	2024–25	I liga	8	0	—		—		—		8	0
Career total			239	0	15	0	0	0	2	0	256	0

== Honours ==
Energetyk ROW Rybnik

- II liga West: 2012–13

Botev Plovdiv

- Bulgarian Cup: 2023–24
- Bulgarian Supercup: 2017

Śląsk Wrocław II

- III liga, group III: 2019–20
