= 2016–17 Bulgarian Cup =

Tournament details
- Country: Bulgaria
- Teams: 32

Final positions
- Champions: Botev Plovdiv (3rd title)
- Runners-up: Ludogorets Razgrad

Tournament statistics
- Matches played: 33
- Goals scored: 104 (3.15 per match)
- Top goal scorer(s): (Brazil) João Paulo (Romania) Claudiu Keșerü (6 goals)

The 2016−17 Bulgarian Cup was the 35th official edition of the Bulgarian annual football knockout tournament. The competition began on 20 September 2016 with the first round and finished with the final on 24 May 2017. CSKA Sofia were the defending champions, but lost in the first round to Lokomotiv Sofia. Botev Plovdiv won its third cup, after winning the final against Ludogorets Razgrad. Botev, thus, qualified for the first qualifying round of the 2017–18 UEFA Europa League.

== Participating clubs ==
The following 32 teams qualified for the competition:

2016–17 First League; 14 clubs	2016–17 Second League; 14 non-reserve clubs	Winners of 4 regional competitions 4 clubs
Beroe Stara Zagora; Botev Plovdiv; CSKA Sofia; Cherno More Varna; Dunav Ruse; Levski Sofia; Lokomotiv Gorna Oryahovitsa; Lokomotiv Plovdiv; Ludogorets Razgrad; Montana; Neftochimic Burgas; Pirin Blagoevgrad; Slavia Sofia; Vereya Stara Zagora	Bansko; Botev Galabovo; Botev Vratsa; Etar Veliko Tarnovo; Levski Karlovo; Lokomotiv Sofia; Nesebar; Oborishte Panagyurishte; Pomorie; Sozopol; Spartak Pleven; Septemvri Sofia; Tsarsko Selo Sofia; Vitosha Bistritsa	from North-West zone: Litex Lovech; from North-East zone: Chernomorets Balchik; from South-East zone: Rozova Dolina Kazanlak; from South-West zone: Pirin Gotse Delchev

== Matches ==
=== Round of 32 ===
The draw was conducted on 7 September 2016. The games were played between 20 and 22 September 2016. On this stage all of the participants started their participation i.e. the 14 teams from First League, the 14 non-reserve teams from Second League and the 4 winners from the regional amateur competitions.

20 September 2016	Levski Karlovo (II)	0–2	Vereya Stara Zagora	Stara Zagora
16:00 EEST		Report	Andonov 44' (pen.); Kostov 63'	Stadium: Trace Arena; Attendance: 120; Referee: Vihren Manev (Sofia)

20 September 2016	Spartak Pleven (II)	2–3	Pirin Blagoevgrad	Pleven
16:00 EEST	Gadi 64'; I.Ivanov 79' (pen.)	Report	Mujeci 48'; Bengyuzov 60'; Mladenov 88'	Stadium: Stadion Slavi Aleksiev; Attendance: 100; Referee: Tihomir Aleksov (Sofia)

20 September 2016	Etar Veliko Tarnovo (II)	1–1 (a.e.t.) (3–4 p)	Neftochimic Burgas	Veliko Tarnovo
16:00 EEST	Abayián 27'	Report	Hazurov 70' (pen.)	Stadium: Stadion Ivaylo; Attendance: 830; Referee: Stanislav Todorov (Shumen)
	Penalties
	Skerlev (penalty scored); Genchev (penalty scored); Todorov (penalty missed); Plahov (penalty scored); Tsvetkov (penalty missed)		(penalty scored) Hristov; (penalty missed) Hazurov; (penalty scored) Valchanov; (penalty scored) Rumenov; (penalty scored) Hadzhiev

20 September 2016	Botev Galabovo (II)	2–3	Montana	Galabovo
16:00 EEST	Halil 40', 51'	Report	Toshev 59'; Atanasov 69'; Petkov 74'	Stadium: Stadion Hristo Botev; Attendance: 400; Referee: Vangel Vangelov (Sofia)

20 September 2016	Botev Vratsa (II)	0–4	Ludogorets Razgrad	Vratsa
16:00 EEST		Report	Sasha 33'; Campanharo 45+1'; Terziev 60'; Anicet 90+3' (pen.)	Stadium: Stadion Hristo Botev; Attendance: 750; Referee: Ivaylo Stoyanov (Petrich)

20 September 2016	Chernomorets Balchik (III)	2–5	Lokomotiv Plovdiv	Balchik
16:00 EEST	Popov 38'; Aleksandrov 90'	Report	Marchev 12'; Velkovski 42', 43'; Raynov 70'; Rashid 89'	Stadium: Stadion Balchik; Attendance: 600; Referee: Ivelin Zanev (Ruse)

21 September 2016	Vitosha Bistritsa (II)	1–1 (a.e.t.) (7–8 p)	Dunav Ruse	Bistritsa
16:00 EEST	Vasilev 88'	Report	Kostadinov 53'	Stadium: Stadion Vitosha; Attendance: 140; Referee: Nikolay Yordanov (Sofia)
	Penalties
	Petrov (penalty missed); Kochilov (penalty scored); Vasilev (penalty scored); Sadula (penalty missed); Hristozov (penalty scored); Amzin (penalty scored); Uzunov (penalty scored); Krastev (penalty scored); Andonov (penalty scored); Otofe (penalty missed); Radev (penalty missed)		(penalty scored) Budinov; (penalty scored) Atanasov; (penalty scored) Dimov; (penalty missed) Milchev; (penalty missed) Ognyanov; (penalty scored) Shopov; (penalty scored) Davronov; (penalty scored) Patev; (penalty scored) Kolev; (penalty missed) Antonov; (penalty scored) Petkov

21 September 2016	Nesebar (II)	1–2	Pomorie (II)	Nesebar
16:00 EEST	Mirchev 25'	Report	Lemperov 60'; Stoyanov 67'	Stadium: Stadion Nesebar; Attendance: 60; Referee: Stanislav Stavrov (Veliko Tarnovo)

21 September 2016	Bansko (II)	0–1	Sozopol (II)	Bansko
16:00 EEST		Report	Peshov 21'	Stadium: Stadion Sveti Petar; Attendance: 80; Referee: Angel Bayaltsaliev (Sofia)

21 September 2016	Septemvri Sofia (II)	2–0	Beroe Stara Zagora	Sofia
16:00 EEST	Stoichkov 42'; Tonchev 57'	Report		Stadium: Stadion Dragalevtsi; Attendance: 230; Referee: Nikola Popov (Sofia)

21 September 2016	Lokomotiv Sofia (II)	2–1	CSKA Sofia	Sofia
16:00 EEST	Georgiev 6'; Hristov 71'	Report	Pedro 54'	Stadium: Stadion Lokomotiv; Attendance: 960; Referee: Angel Angelov (Sofia)

21 September 2016	Pirin Gotse Delchev (III)	3–6	Botev Plovdiv	Gotse Delchev
16:00 EEST	Hazurov 38', 69' (pen.); Mehremski 77'	Report	Brisola 40', 75'; Nedelev 53', 71' (pen.); Paulo 55', 64'	Stadium: Gradski stadion Attendance: 700; Referee: Ivan Penchev (Stara Zagora)

21 September 2016	Rozova Dolina Kazanlak (III)	1–2	Cherno More Varna	Kazanlak
16:00 EEST	Rachev 85' (pen.)	Report	Kokonov 20'; Yoskov 80'	Stadium: Stadion Sevtopolis; Attendance: 1,500; Referee: Valentin Zhelezov (Burgas)

21 September 2016	Litex Lovech (III)	2–0	Slavia Sofia	Lovech
19:00 EEST	Seliminski 72'; Pisarov 83'	Report		Stadium: Stadion Lovech; Attendance: 680; Referee: Ryustem Karagaren (Asenovgrad)

22 September 2016	Tsarsko Selo Sofia (II)	0–2	Levski Sofia	Sofia
16:00 EEST		Report	Adeniji 76'; Deza 90+3'	Stadium: Stadion Lokomotiv; Attendance: 1,300; Referee: Stefan Pavlov (Burgas)

22 September 2016	Oborishte Panagyurishte (II)	2–0	Lokomotiv Gorna Oryahovitsa	Panagyurishte
16:00 EEST	Shterev 61'; Aytov 74'	Report		Stadium: Stadion Orcho Voyvoda; Attendance: 550; Referee: Martin Stoimenov (Sofia)

=== Round of 16 ===
The draw was conducted on 27 September 2016. The games were played between 25 and 27 October 2016. On this stage the participants will be the 16 winners from the first round.

25 October 2016	Septemvri Sofia (II)	0−2	Dunav Ruse	Sofia
15:00 EEST		Report	Atanasov 13'; Shopov 18'	Stadium: Stadion Dragalevtsi; Attendance: 310; Referee: Georgi Kabakov (Plovdiv)

25 October 2016	Lokomotiv Plovdiv	6−0	Oborishte Panagyurishte (II)	Plovdiv
18:00 EEST	Raykov 12', 61'; Valchev 18'; Kamburov 45'; Karageren 83'; Velkovski 86'	Report		Stadium: Stadion Lokomotiv; Attendance: 430; Referee: Stefan Pavlov (Burgas)

25 October 2016	Montana	0−4	Ludogorets Razgrad	Razgrad
20:00 EEST		Report	Keșerü 9', 79'; Natanael 32'; Misidjan 90'	Stadium: Ludogorets Arena; Attendance: 350; Referee: Georgi Davidov (Veliko Tarnovo)

26 October 2016	Litex Lovech (III)	1−1 (a.e.t.) (4–2 p)	Lokomotiv Sofia (II)	Lovech
18:00 EEST	Pisarov 51'	Report	Bonev 54'	Stadium: Stadion Lovech; Attendance: 700; Referee: Martin Stoimenov (Sofia)
	Penalties
	Petkov (penalty scored); R. Ivanov (penalty scored); I. Ivanov (penalty missed); Grozev (penalty scored); Seliminski (penalty scored)		(penalty scored) Peev; (penalty missed) Viyachki; (penalty scored) Goranov; (penalty missed) Bouzoukis

26 October 2016	Levski Sofia	2−3 (a.e.t.)	Cherno More Varna	Sofia
19:00 EEST	Adeniji 63'; Pirgov 79'	Report	Tsvetkov 3', 101'; Bacari 31'	Stadium: Stadion Georgi Asparuhov; Attendance: 1,190; Referee: Volen Chinkov (Sofia)

27 October 2016	Sozopol (II)	0−1	Pirin Blagoevgrad	Sozopol
16:00 EEST		Report	Mladenov 72'	Stadium: Arena Sozopol; Attendance: 410; Referee: Angel Bayaltsaliev (Sofia)

27 October 2016	Vereya Stara Zagora	1−0	Pomorie (II)	Stara Zagora
17:00 EEST	Dikov 42'	Report		Stadium: Trace Arena; Attendance: 90; Referee: Petar Dorovski (Sofia)

27 October 2016	Botev Plovdiv	3−0	Neftochimic Burgas	Plovdiv
20:00 EEST	Terziev 8'; Paulo 25'; I. Stoyanov 28'	Report		Stadium: Futbolen kompleks Botev 1912; Attendance: 1,170; Referee: Ivaylo Stoyanov (Petrich)

=== Quarter-finals ===
The draw was conducted on 2 November 2016. The games will be played between 4 and 6 April 2017. On this stage the participants will be the 8 winners from the second round.

4 April 2017	Pirin Blagoevgrad	0−1	Botev Plovdiv	Blagoevgrad
20:00 EEST		Report	Baltanov 27'	Stadium: Stadion Hristo Botev; Attendance: 3,650; Referee: Nikolay Yordanov (Sofia)

5 April 2017	Litex Lovech (III)	1−1 (a.e.t.) (5–3 p)	Cherno More Varna	Lovech
17:30 EEST	Kostov 25' (pen.)	Report	Venkov 34'	Stadium: Stadion Lovech; Attendance: 1,750; Referee: Volen Chinkov (Sofia)
	Penalties
	Kostov (penalty scored); Balakov (penalty scored); Genkov (penalty scored); R. Ivanov (penalty scored); Baychev (penalty scored)		(penalty scored) G. Iliev; (penalty scored) Tsvetkov; (penalty missed) Venkov; (penalty scored) Kokonov

5 April 2017	Lokomotiv Plovdiv	0−4	Ludogorets Razgrad	Plovdiv
20:00 EEST		Report	Marcelinho 32'; Wanderson 59'; Vidanov 62' (o.g.); Misidjan 78'	Stadium: Stadion Lokomotiv; Attendance: 3,650; Referee: Ivaylo Stoyanov (Petrich)

6 April 2017	Vereya Stara Zagora	2−0	Dunav Ruse	Stara Zagora
20:00 EEST	Eugénio 22', 73'	Report		Stadium: Trace Arena; Attendance: 325; Referee: Stefan Apostolov (Blagoevgrad)

=== Semi-finals ===
The draw was conducted on 7 April 2017. The first legs will be played on 18 and 19 April and the second legs are scheduled for 26 and 27 April 2017.

==== First legs ====
18 April 2017	Ludogorets Razgrad	4−0	Litex Lovech (III)	Razgrad
19:00 EEST	Misidjan 2'; Campanharo 26'; Vasilev 29'; Quixadá 34'	Report		Stadium: Ludogorets Arena; Attendance: 630; Referee: Stanislav Todorov (Shumen)

19 April 2017	Vereya Stara Zagora	0−1	Botev Plovdiv	Stara Zagora
19:00 EEST		Report	Nedelev 90+6' (pen.)	Stadium: Trace Arena; Attendance: 2,500; Referee: Volen Chinkov (Sofia)

==== Second legs ====
26 April 2017	Botev Plovdiv	1–1 (2–1 agg.)	Vereya Stara Zagora	Plovdiv
18:00 EEST	Vutov 34'	Report	Kaloyanov 61'	Stadium: Futbolen kompleks Botev 1912; Attendance: 2,900; Referee: Angel Angelov (Sofia)

27 April 2017	Litex Lovech (III)	0−7 (0−11 agg.)	Ludogorets Razgrad	Lovech
18:00 EEST		Report	Paulo 12', 52', 82'; Keșerü 24', 68', 90' (pen.); Misidjan 38'	Stadium: Stadion Lovech; Attendance: 300; Referee: Georgi Davidov (Veliko Tarnovo)

=== Final ===
24 May 2017
18:30 EEST

Ludogorets Razgrad	1−2	Botev Plovdiv
Keșerü 80'	Report	Kossoko 44'; Vutov 52'

Vasil Levski National Stadium, Sofia
Attendance: 9,800
Referee: Nikola Popov (Sofia)

== Bracket ==
Round of 32
1	Ludogorets Razgrad	4
2	Botev Vratsa	0
2	Botev Galabovo	2
1	Montana	3
2	Oborishte Panagyurishte	2
1	Lokomotiv Gorna Oryahovitsa	0
3	Chernomorets Balchik	2
1	Lokomotiv Plovdiv	5
1	Cherno More Varna	2
3	Rozova Dolina Kazanlak	0
2	Tsarsko Selo Sofia	0
1	Levski Sofia	2
2	Lokomotiv Sofia	2
1	CSKA Sofia	1
1	Slavia Sofia	0
3	Litex Lovech	2
1	Vereya Stara Zagora	2
2	Levski Karlovo	0
2	Nesebar	1
2	Pomorie	2
2	Septemvri Sofia	2
1	Beroe Stara Zagora	0
2	Vitosha Bistritsa	1
1	Dunav Ruse (a.e.t.)	2
1	Pirin Blagoevgrad	3
2	Spartak Pleven	2
2	Bansko	0
2	Sozopol	1
1	Neftochimic Burgas (a.e.t.)	2
2	Etar Veliko Tarnovo	1
3	Pirin Gotse Delchev	3
1	Botev Plovdiv	6

Round of 16
1	Ludogorets Razgrad	4
1	Montana	0
2	Oborishte Panagyurishte	0
1	Lokomotiv Plovdiv	6
1	Cherno More Varna (a.e.t.)	3
1	Levski Sofia	2
2	Lokomotiv Sofia	1
3	Litex Lovech (a.e.t.)	2
1	Vereya Stara Zagora	1
2	Pomorie	0
2	Septemvri Sofia	0
1	Dunav Ruse	2
1	Pirin Blagoevgrad	1
2	Sozopol	0
1	Neftochimic Burgas	0
1	Botev Plovdiv	3

Quarter-finals
1	Ludogorets Razgrad	4
1	Lokomotiv Plovdiv	0
1	Cherno More Varna	1
3	Litex Lovech (a.e.t.)	2
1	Vereya Stara Zagora	2
1	Dunav Ruse	0
1	Pirin Blagoevgrad	0
1	Botev Plovdiv	1

Semi-finals
1	Ludogorets Razgrad	4	7
3	Litex Lovech	0	0
1	Vereya Stara Zagora	0	1
1	Botev Plovdiv	1	1

Final
1	Ludogorets Razgrad	1
1	Botev Plovdiv	2

== Top goalscorers ==
As of 24 May 2017

Rank	Player	Club	Goals
1	(Brazil) João Paulo	Ludogorets Razgrad (Note: Including 3 goals for Botev Plovdiv.)	6
1	(Romania) Claudiu Keșerü	Ludogorets Razgrad	6
3	(Netherlands) Virgil Misidjan	Ludogorets Razgrad	4
4	(Bulgaria) Todor Nedelev	Botev Plovdiv	3
4	(Bulgaria) Dimitar Velkovski	Lokomotiv Plovdiv	3
6	10 players		2
