= 2016–17 PFC Ludogorets Razgrad season =

Ludogorets Razgrad
2016–17 season
- Chairman: Aleksandar Aleksandrov
- Manager: Georgi Dermendzhiev
- First League: 1st
- Bulgarian Cup: Runners-up
- Champions League: Group stage
- Europa League: Round of 32
- Top goalscorer: League: Claudiu Keșerü (22); All: Claudiu Keșerü (32)
Home colours	Away colours

The 2016–17 season is Ludogorets Razgrad's sixth season in the First League, of which they are defending Champions. They will also take part in the Bulgarian Cup, SuperCup and enter the UEFA Champions League at the second qualifying round stage.

== Squad ==
As of match played 31 May 2017

No.	Name	Nationality	Position	Date of birth (age)	Signed from	Signed in	Contract ends	Apps.	Goals
Goalkeepers
21	Vladislav Stoyanov	(Bulgaria)	GK	8 June 1987 (aged 29)	Sheriff Tiraspol	2013		124	0
29	Daniel Naumov	(Bulgaria)	GK	29 March 1998 (aged 19)	Youth Team	2016		0	0
33	Renan	(Brazil)	GK	18 May 1989 (aged 28)	Avaí	2017		12	0
Defenders
4	Cicinho	(Brazil)	DF	26 December 1988 (aged 28)	Santos	2015		36	1
5	José Luis Palomino	(Argentina)	DF	5 January 1990 (aged 27)	Metz	2016		41	2
6	Natanael	(Brazil)	DF	25 December 1990 (aged 26)	Athletico Paranaense	2015		68	3
19	Aleksandar Vasilev	(Bulgaria)	DF	27 April 1995 (aged 22)	Kaliakra Kavarna	2014		26	2
24	Preslav Petrov	(Bulgaria)	DF	1 May 1995 (aged 22)	Vidima-Rakovski	2014		7	0
25	Yordan Minev	(Bulgaria)	DF	14 October 1980 (aged 36)	Botev Plovdiv	2011		174	1
27	Cosmin Moți	(Romania)	DF	3 December 1984 (aged 32)	Dinamo București	2012		181	21
32	Ihor Plastun	(Ukraine)	DF	20 August 1990 (aged 26)	Karpaty Lviv	2016		33	2
73	Kristiyan Dimitrov	(Bulgaria)	DF	16 April 1993 (aged 24)	Dobrudzha Dobrich	2017		2	1
77	Vitinha	(Portugal)	DF	11 February 1986 (aged 31)	Concordia Chiajna	2012		56	0
99	Kristiyan Grigorov	(Bulgaria)	DF	27 October 1990 (aged 26)	Spartak Pleven	2015		2	1
Midfielders
8	Lucas Sasha	(Brazil)	MF	1 March 1990 (aged 27)	Hapoel Tel Aviv	2015		59	5
10	Campanharo	(Brazil)	MF	4 April 1992 (aged 25)	Bragantino	2016		35	4
12	Anicet Abel	(Madagascar)	MF	13 March 1990 (aged 27)	Botev Plovdiv	2014		96	6
14	Slavcho Shokolarov	(Bulgaria)	MF	20 August 1989 (aged 27)	Pomorie	2016		4	1
18	Svetoslav Dyakov	(Bulgaria)	MF	31 May 1984 (aged 33)	Lokomotiv Sofia	2012		213	10
34	Oleg Dimitrov	(Bulgaria)	MF	6 March 1996 (aged 21)	Youth Team	2015		5	0
38	Kristiyan Kitov	(Bulgaria)	MF	14 October 1996 (aged 20)	CSKA Sofia	2012		5	0
45	Ivaylo Klimentov	(Bulgaria)	MF	3 February 1998 (aged 19)	Youth Team	2015		3	0
76	Serdar Yusufov	(Bulgaria)	MF	2 October 1998 (aged 18)	Youth Team	2016		1	0
80	Denislav Aleksandrov	(Bulgaria)	MF	19 July 1997 (aged 19)	Youth Team	2014		8	0
84	Marcelinho	(Bulgaria)	MF	24 August 1984 (aged 32)	Bragantino	2011		229	67
85	Atanas Karachorov	(Bulgaria)	MF	18 June 1998 (aged 18)	Youth Team	2016		1	0
88	Wanderson	(Brazil)	MF	2 January 1988 (aged 29)	Portuguesa	2014		115	40
92	Jody Lukoki	(Democratic Republic of the Congo)	MF	15 November 1992 (aged 24)	PEC Zwolle	2015		48	4
97	Tomas Tsvyatkov	(Bulgaria)	MF	1 June 1997 (aged 19)	Youth Team	2016		2	1
98	Svetoslav Kovachev	(Bulgaria)	MF	14 March 1998 (aged 19)	Youth Team	2015		5	2
Forwards
11	Juninho Quixadá	(Brazil)	FW	12 December 1985 (aged 31)	Bragantino	2011		163	38
17	Tsvetelin Chunchukov	(Bulgaria)	FW	26 December 1994 (aged 22)	Botev Plovdiv	2015		9	0
22	Jonathan Cafú	(Brazil)	FW	10 July 1991 (aged 25)	São Paulo	2015		69	21
28	Claudiu Keșerü	(Romania)	FW	2 December 1986 (aged 30)	Al-Gharafa	2015		74	47
37	João Paulo	(Brazil)	FW	2 June 1988 (aged 28)	Botev Plovdiv	2017		10	4
93	Vura	(Netherlands)	FW	24 July 1993 (aged 23)	Willem II	2013		149	34
Players away on loan
1	Milan Borjan	(Canada)	GK	23 October 1987 (aged 29)	Radnički Niš	2016		22	0
16	Brayan Angulo	(Colombia)	DF	2 November 1989 (aged 27)	Granada	2014		35	1
37	Ventsislav Kerchev	(Bulgaria)	DF	2 June 1997 (aged 19)	Youth Team	2014		24	2
55	Georgi Terziev	(Bulgaria)	DF	18 April 1992 (aged 25)	Chernomorets Burgas	2013		67	3
Players who left during the season
30	Andrei Prepeliță	(Romania)	MF	8 December 1985 (aged 31)	Steaua București	2015		27	1
71	Yanaki Smirnov	(Bulgaria)	FW	20 December 1992 (aged 24)	Lokomotiv GO	2015		3	1

=== Out on loan ===
Note: Flags indicate national team as defined under FIFA eligibility rules; some limited exceptions apply. Players may hold more than one non-FIFA nationality.

No.	Pos.	Nation	Player
1	GK	CAN	Milan Borjan (at Korona Kielce)
16	DF	COL	Brayan Angulo (at Chiapas)
37	DF	BUL	Ventsislav Kerchev (at Lokomotiv GO)
55	DF	BUL	Georgi Terziev (at Hajduk Split)

== Transfers ==
=== Summer ===
In: Note: Flags indicate national team as defined under FIFA eligibility rules; some limited exceptions apply. Players may hold more than one non-FIFA nationality.

No.	Pos.	Nation	Player
5	DF	ARG	José Palomino (from (France) Metz)
10	MF	BRA	Gustavo Campanharo (from (Brazil) Bragantino)
32	DF	UKR	Ihor Plastun (from (Ukraine) Karpaty Lviv)

Out: Note: Flags indicate national team as defined under FIFA eligibility rules; some limited exceptions apply. Players may hold more than one non-FIFA nationality.

No.	Pos.	Nation	Player
3	DF	BUL	Teynur Marem (to (Bulgaria) Dunav Ruse)
16	DF	COL	Brayan Angulo (loan to (Mexico) Chiapas)
19	MF	BUL	Aleksandar Vasilev (on loan to (Bulgaria) Beroe Stara Zagora)
30	MF	ROU	Andrei Prepeliță (to (Russia) Rostov)
33	GK	BUL	Georgi Argilashki (on loan to (Bulgaria) Pirin Blagoevgrad)
71	FW	BUL	Yanaki Smirnov (on loan to (Bulgaria) Lokomotiv GO)
91	GK	BUL	Ivan Čvorović (to (Bulgaria) Levski Sofia)

=== Winter ===
In: Note: Flags indicate national team as defined under FIFA eligibility rules; some limited exceptions apply. Players may hold more than one non-FIFA nationality.

No.	Pos.	Nation	Player
19	MF	BUL	Aleksandar Vasilev (loan return from (Bulgaria) Beroe Stara Zagora)
33	GK	BRA	Renan (from (Brazil) Avaí)
37	FW	BRA	João Paulo (from (Bulgaria) Botev Plovdiv)

Out: Note: Flags indicate national team as defined under FIFA eligibility rules; some limited exceptions apply. Players may hold more than one non-FIFA nationality.

No.	Pos.	Nation	Player
1	GK	CAN	Milan Borjan (on loan to (Poland) Korona Kielce)
55	DF	BUL	Georgi Terziev (loan to (Croatia) Hajduk Split)
71	FW	BUL	Yanaki Smirnov (released, previously on loan at (Bulgaria) Lokomotiv GO)

== Competitions ==
=== Bulgarian Supercup ===
	CSKA Sofia	–	Ludogorets Razgrad
EEST (UTC+3)		[ Summary]

=== A Football Group ===
==== Regular stage ====
===== League table =====
Pos	Team	Pld	W	D	L	GF	GA	GD	Pts	Qualification
1	Ludogorets Razgrad	26	21	4	1	69	19	+50	67	Qualification for the championship round
2	Levski Sofia	26	15	6	5	38	17	+21	51	Qualification for the championship round
3	CSKA Sofia	26	13	7	6	35	16	+19	46	Qualification for the championship round
4	Cherno More	26	12	7	7	30	24	+6	43	Qualification for the championship round
5	Lokomotiv Plovdiv	26	10	9	7	35	30	+5	39	Qualification for the championship round

Source: Bulgarian Football Union, Soccerway
Rules for classification: 1) Points; 2) Head-to-head points; 3) Head-to-head goal difference; 4) Head-to-head goals scored; 5) Head-to-head away goals scored (only if two teams); 6) Goal difference; 7) Goals scored; 8) Fairplay ranking; 9) Draw.

===== Results summary =====
Overall								Home						Away					
Pld	W	D	L	GF	GA	GD	Pts	W	D	L	GF	GA	GD	W	D	L	GF	GA	GD
26	21	4	1	68	18	+50	67	11	2	0	31	7	+24	10	2	1	37	11	+26

Last updated: 3 April 2017.
Source: See Results

===== Results by round =====
Round	1	2	3	4	5	6	7	8	9	10	11	12	13	14	15	16	17	18	19	20	21	22	23	24	25	26
Ground	A	H	A	H	A	A	H	A	H	A	H	A	H	H	A	H	H	H	A	A	H	A	H	A	H	A
Result	W	W	L	W	D	W	W	W	W	W	W	W	W	W	W	W	W	D	W	W	W	D	W	W	D	W
Position	4	8	5	6	3	3	3	2	2	2	2	2	1	1	1	1	1	1	1	1	1	1	1	1	1	1

Source: See results
A = Away; H = Home; W = Win; D = Draw; L = Loss

===== Results =====
6 August 2016 2	Ludogorets Razgrad	4–1	Botev Plovdiv	Razgrad
21:15 EEST (UTC+3)	Cicinho 9'; Marcelinho 19'; Keșerü 44' (pen.); Quixadá 53'	Summary	Sténio 2'	Stadium: Ludogorets Arena; Attendance: 2,200; Referee: Nikolay Yordanov

13 August 2016 3	Levski Sofia	1–0	Ludogorets Razgrad	Sofia
21:15 EEST (UTC+3)	Añete (yellow card) 13'; Kostadinov (yellow card) 32'; Pirgov (yellow card) 63'; Minev (yellow card) 76'; Kraev 90+1'; Jorgačević (yellow card) 90+4'; Bourabia (yellow card) 90+5'	Summary	Cicinho (yellow card) 13'; Moți (yellow card) 71'; Quixadá (yellow card) 90+3'	Stadium: Stadion Georgi Asparuhov; Attendance: 4,941; Referee: Ivaylo Stoyanov

20 August 2016 4	Ludogorets Razgrad	2–0	Montana	Razgrad
21:15 EEST (UTC+3)	Shokolarov 4'; Cicinho (yellow card) 25'; Keșerü 54'	Summary	Trifonov (yellow card) 24'; Chipev (yellow card) 38'; Muradov (yellow card) 52'	Stadium: Ludogorets Arena; Attendance: 1,100; Referee: Vladimir Valkov

28 August 2016 5	Lokomotiv Plovdiv	2–2	Ludogorets Razgrad	Plovdiv
21:15 EEST (UTC+3)	Kamburov 24'; Trajanov (yellow card) 28'; Raykov 85', (yellow card) 86'; Vezalov (yellow card) 90+1'; Valchev (yellow card) 90+2'	Summary	Plastun 53', (yellow card) 90+2'; Keșerü 73'; Sasha (yellow card) 90+3'	Stadium: Stadion Lokomotiv; Attendance: 2,500; Referee: Stanislav Stavrov

9 September 2016 6	Cherno More	1–3	Ludogorets Razgrad	Kavarna
21:15 EEST (UTC+3)	Palomino 39' (o.g.); Palankov (yellow card) 45+3'; Iliev (yellow card) 54'; Malík (yellow card) 77'; Sukup (yellow card) 82'	Summary	Wanderson 58'; Marcelinho 75', 84'; Dyakov (yellow card) 77'; Lukoki (yellow card) 85'	Stadium: Stadion Kavarna; Attendance: 1,500; Referee: Nikola Popov

17 September 2016 7	Ludogorets Razgrad	3–1	Slavia Sofia	Razgrad
21:15 EEST (UTC+3)	Moți 12' (pen.), (yellow card) 67'; Wanderson 44'; Marcelinho (yellow card) 71'; Cafú 75'	Summary	Velkov 60'; Omar (yellow card) 73'; Martinov (yellow card) 88'	Stadium: Ludogorets Arena; Attendance: 1,700; Referee: Nikolay Yordanov

23 September 2016 8	Vereya	1–5	Ludogorets Razgrad	Stara Zagora
21:15 EEST (UTC+3)	Elias 84' (pen.)	Summary	Vura 13'; Cafú 29', 68'; Wanderson 49'; Marcelinho 70'	Stadium: Trace Arena; Attendance: 500; Referee: Dragomir Draganov

2 October 2016 9	Ludogorets Razgrad	3–1	Neftochimic	Razgrad
20:00 EEST (UTC+3)	Wanderson 13'; Sasha 56'; Keșerü 70'	Summary	Valchanov (yellow card) 14'; Malinov (yellow card) 20'; Dyulgerov (yellow card) 39', (goal) 47'; Homei (yellow card) 90'	Stadium: Ludogorets Arena; Attendance: 950; Referee: Stanislav Todorov

14 October 2016 10	Pirin Blagoevgrad	1–3	Ludogorets Razgrad	Blagoevgrad
20:00 EEST (UTC+3)	Kostov (yellow card) 6'; Mladenov 15'; Kostadinov (yellow card) 54'	Summary	Moți 7' (pen.); Vura (yellow card) 12'; Abel (yellow card) 15'; Cafú 22'; Dyakov (yellow card) 73'; Bashliev 78' (o.g.)	Stadium: Stadion Hristo Botev; Attendance: 1,200; Referee: Georgi Kabakov

22 October 2016 11	Ludogorets Razgrad	4–0	Lokomotiv Gorna Oryahovitsa	Razgrad
20:00 EEST (UTC+3)	Keșerü 25', 78'; Marcelinho 51'; Natanael (yellow card) 86'; Quixadá 90+1'	Summary	Coureur (yellow card) 29'; Apostolov (yellow card) 45'; Ndong (yellow card) 67'; Zhelev (yellow card) 71'; Tsonkov (red card) 80'	Stadium: Ludogorets Arena; Attendance: 750; Referee: Stefan Apostolov

28 October 2016 12	Dunav Ruse	3–5	Ludogorets Razgrad	Razgrad
20:00 EEST (UTC+3)	Budinov 14'; Shopov 33'; Dzhalilov (yellow card) 36'; Marem (yellow card) 41'; Patev 66'; Davronov (yellow card) 79' (yellow-red card) 86'	Summary	Keșerü 15', 30', 74'; Natanael (yellow card) 31'; Wanderson 45+1'; Moți (yellow card) 66'; Cafú 90+2'	Stadium: Ludogorets Arena; Attendance: 1,600; Referee: Nikolay Yordanov

5 November 2016 13	Ludogorets Razgrad	2–1	CSKA Sofia	Razgrad
15:00 EET (UTC+2)	Wanderson 28', (yellow card) 49'; Sasha (yellow card) 30'; Cicinho (yellow card) 53'; Keșerü (yellow card) 59'; Moți 62'	Summary	Pérez (yellow card) 15' (yellow-red card) 71'; Arsénio (yellow card) 32'; Simão (yellow card) 38'; Boumal (yellow card) 55'; Manolev (yellow card) 83'; Culma 90+2'	Stadium: Ludogorets Arena; Attendance: 5,800; Referee: Nikola Popov

16 November 2016 1	Beroe	0–2	Ludogorets Razgrad	Stara Zagora
17:30 EET (UTC+2)	Zehirov (yellow card) 69'; Kolev (yellow card) 90+4'	Summary	Marcelinho 24'; Keșerü 25'; Cafú (yellow card) 66'; Moți (yellow card) 72'; Abel (yellow card) 90+4'	Stadium: Stadion Beroe; Attendance: 650; Referee: Georgi Kabakov

19 November 2016 14	Ludogorets Razgrad	1–0	Beroe	Razgrad
17:30 EET (UTC+2)	Cafú 70'; Vura (yellow card) 90+2'	Summary	Ivanov (yellow card) 25'; Kato (yellow card) 68'	Stadium: Ludogorets Arena; Attendance: 1,600; Referee: Dragomir Draganov

26 November 2016 15	Botev Plovdiv	1–3	Ludogorets Razgrad	Plovdiv
17:30 EET (UTC+2)	João Paulo 9'; Georgiev (yellow card) 45+1'; Zlatkov (yellow card) 51'; Sténio (yellow card) 54'; Milev (yellow card) 90+2'	Summary	Lukoki 3'; Quixadá (yellow card) 41'; Campanharo 70'; Keșerü 79'; Natanael (yellow card) 80'	Stadium: Futbolen kompleks Botev 1912; Attendance: 1,900; Referee: Stanislav Stavrov

30 November 2016 16	Ludogorets Razgrad	2–1	Levski Sofia	Razgrad
17:30 EET (UTC+2)	Cafú (yellow card) 17'; Wanderson 70'; Marcelinho 81'	Summary	Adeniji 6'; S. Aleksandrov (yellow card) 17'; Añete (yellow card) 54'; Pirgov (yellow card) 61' de Nooijer (yellow card) 76'; G. Ivanov (yellow card) 81'	Stadium: Ludogorets Arena; Attendance: 2,500; Referee: Stanislav Todorov

10 December 2016 17	Ludogorets Razgrad	1–0	Lokomotiv Plovdiv	Razgrad
17:30 EET (UTC+2)	Cafú 34', (yellow card) 71'; Dyakov (yellow card) 35'; Moți (yellow card) 87'	Summary	Jevtoski (yellow card) 50'; Bakalov (yellow card) 53'; Goranov (yellow card) 66'; Marchev (yellow card) 90'	Stadium: Ludogorets Arena; Attendance: 1,500; Referee: Nikolay Yordanov

14 December 2016 18	Ludogorets Razgrad	1–1	Cherno More	Razgrad
15:15 EET (UTC+2)	Keșerü 49'; Sasha (yellow card) 60'; Natanael (yellow card) 62'	Summary	Venkov (yellow card) 38'; Kuzma 51'; Georgiev (yellow card) 61' (yellow-red card) 76'; Palankov (yellow card) 69'; Kovář (yellow card) 90+3'	Stadium: Ludogorets Arena; Attendance: 420; Referee: Nikola Popov

12 February 2017 19	Montana	0–4	Ludogorets Razgrad	Sofia
15:00 EET (UTC+2)	Jakolić (yellow card) 58'; Gadzhev (yellow card) 71'; Genov (yellow card) 86'	Summary	Marcelinho 45', 62'; Wanderson 79'; Cafú 82'	Stadium: Natsionalen stadion Vasil Levski; Attendance: 50; Referee: Ivaylo Stoyanov

20 February 2017 20	Slavia Sofia	0–2	Ludogorets Razgrad	Sofia
15:00 EET (UTC+2)	Martinov (yellow card) 53'; Vasilev (yellow card) 78'; Milev (yellow card) 78'	Summary	Wanderson (yellow card) 12'; Keșerü 67'; Quixadá 76'; Marcelinho (yellow card) 79'	Stadium: Natsionalen stadion Vasil Levski; Attendance: 200; Referee: Stefan Apostolov

26 February 2017 21	Ludogorets Razgrad	4–0	Vereya	Razgrad
17:30 EET (UTC+2)	Natanael (yellow card) 17'; Campanharo 48'; Wanderson 61'; João Paulo 80'; Marcelinho 87'	Summary	Hassani (yellow card) 8'	Stadium: Ludogorets Arena; Attendance: 850; Referee: Georgi Davidov

1 March 2017 22	Neftochimic	1–1	Ludogorets Razgrad	Burgas
17:30 EET (UTC+2)	Homei (yellow card) 23'; G. Ivanov (yellow card) 25'; Hashev (yellow card) 40'; Onuoha (yellow card) 60'; Yordanov (yellow card) 75'; Milanov 89'; Petkov (yellow card) 90'	Summary	Keșerü (yellow card) 48'; Sasha (yellow card) 63'; Marcelinho 77'; Vura (yellow card) 78'	Stadium: Stadion Lazur; Attendance: 1,400; Referee: Nikolay Yordanov

5 March 2017 23	Ludogorets Razgrad	3–0	Pirin Blagoevgrad	Razgrad
17:30 EET (UTC+2)	Cafú 50'; Keșerü 60', 69'	Summary	Hans (yellow card) 25'; Jenkins (yellow card) 65'; Blagov (yellow card) 82'	Stadium: Ludogorets Arena; Attendance: 2,000; Referee: Dragomir Draganov

12 March 2017 24	Lokomotiv Gorna Oryahovitsa	0–5	Ludogorets Razgrad	Gorna Oryahovitsa
17:30 EET (UTC+2)	Kifouéti (yellow card) 27'	Summary	Marcelinho 6'; Cafú (yellow card) 22'; Keșerü 49', 86', 90+3'; Sasha (yellow card) 75'; Wanderson 80'	Stadium: Stadion Lokomotiv; Attendance: 2,300; Referee: Nikola Popov

18 March 2017 25	Ludogorets Razgrad	2–2	Dunav Ruse	Razgrad
17:30 EET (UTC+2)	Palomino 14'; Vasilev (yellow card) 60'; Keșerü 70'; Marcelinho (yellow card) 71'; Plastun (yellow card) 76'	Summary	Kostadinov 45+2'; Karagaren 66'; Ayass (yellow card) 77'; Antonov (yellow card) 90+2'	Stadium: Ludogorets Arena; Attendance: 2,400; Referee: Stanislav Todorov

1 April 2017 26	CSKA Sofia	0–2	Ludogorets Razgrad	Sofia
20:00 EEST (UTC+3)	Nedyalkov (yellow card) 28'; Manolev (yellow card) 41'; Pinto (yellow card) 56'; Despodov (yellow card) 57'; Boumal (yellow card) 90+2'	Summary	Moți 28'; Cafú 41'; Sasha (yellow card) 57'; Wanderson (yellow card) 59'; Keșerü (yellow card) 78'	Stadium: Stadion Balgarska Armia; Attendance: 8,800; Referee: Stefan Apostolov

==== Championship stage ====
===== League table =====
Pos	Team	Pld	W	D	L	GF	GA	GD	Pts	Qualification
1	Ludogorets Razgrad (C)	36	25	8	3	87	28	+59	83	Qualification for the Champions League second qualifying round
2	CSKA Sofia (Note: On 29 May 2017 a UEFA letter to the Bulgarian Football Union declared that CSKA Sofia were not allowed to compete in European tournaments for the following two seasons as they were considered to have been re-formed as a new club and thus did not pass the "three-year rule". As this decision was appealed by CSKA Sofia, the Bulgarian Football Union granted a license to them subject to legal proceedings. A few hours prior to the Europa League first qualifying round draw, UEFA replaced them by Dunav Ruse, the fourth-placed team of the league.)	36	19	10	7	51	21	+30	67	
3	Levski Sofia (O)	36	18	9	9	50	31	+19	63	Qualification for the European play-off final
4	Dunav Ruse	36	15	10	11	46	44	+2	55	Qualification for the Europa League first qualifying round
5	Lokomotiv Plovdiv	36	14	10	12	50	52	−2	52	
6	Cherno More Varna	36	13	8	15	39	45	−6	47	

Source: Soccerway
Rules for classification: 1) Points; 2) Head-to-head points; 3) Head-to-head goal difference; 4) Head-to-head goals scored; 5) Head-to-head away goals scored (only if two teams); 6) Goal difference; 7) Goals scored; 8) Fairplay ranking; 9) Draw.
(C) Champions; (O) Play-off winners

===== Results summary =====
Overall								Home						Away					
Pld	W	D	L	GF	GA	GD	Pts	W	D	L	GF	GA	GD	W	D	L	GF	GA	GD
10	4	4	2	16	7	+9	16	1	2	2	6	4	+2	3	2	0	10	3	+7

Last updated: 31 May 2017.
Source: See Results

===== Results by round =====
Round	1	2	3	4	5	6	7	8	9	10
Ground	H	H	A	H	A	A	A	H	A	H
Result	L	D	D	W	W	D	W	D	W	L
Position	1	1	1	1	1	1	1	1	1	1

Source: See results
A = Away; H = Home; W = Win; D = Draw; L = Loss

===== Results =====
9 April 2017 27	Ludogorets Razgrad	0–1	Dunav Ruse	Razgrad
20:00 EEST (UTC+3)	Cicinho (yellow card) 65'; Campanharo (yellow card) 71'; Marcelinho (yellow card) 84'	Summary	Ayass 45'; Karagaren (yellow card) 61'; Antonov (yellow card) 90+4'	Stadium: Ludogorets Arena; Attendance: 1,300; Referee: Dragomir Draganov

14 April 2017 28	Ludogorets Razgrad	0–0	Levski Sofia	Razgrad
20:00 EEST (UTC+3)	Keșerü (yellow card) 47'; Marcelinho (yellow card) 75'	Summary	Pirgov (yellow card) 7'; Minev (yellow card) 34'; Bourabia (yellow card) 61' (yellow-red card) 78'; Luchin (yellow card) 67'; Ognyanov (yellow card) 72'	Stadium: Ludogorets Arena; Attendance: 5,800; Referee: Ivaylo Stoyanov

23 April 2017 29	CSKA Sofia	1–1	Ludogorets Razgrad	Sofia
20:00 EEST (UTC+3)	Karanga (yellow card) 12'; Boumal (yellow card) 40', (goal) 64' (pen.); Bodurov (yellow card) 57'	Summary	Marcelinho (yellow card) 66', (goal) 75'; Palomino (yellow card) 67'; Campanharo (yellow card) 68'; Moți (yellow card) 72'	Stadium: Stadion Balgarska Armia; Attendance: 4,200; Referee: Stefan Apostolov

1 May 2017 30	Ludogorets Razgrad	4–0	Cherno More	Razgrad
20:00 EEST (UTC+3)	Keșerü 7', 45' (pen.), (yellow card) 61'; Palomino 37'; Wanderson 39'; Natanael (yellow card) 43'	Report	Pirulo (yellow card) 16'; Kostadinov (yellow card) 53'; Sukup (yellow card) 73'	Stadium: Ludogorets Arena; Attendance: 900; Referee: Volen Chinkov

5 May 2017 31	Lokomotiv Plovdiv	0–3	Ludogorets Razgrad	Plovdiv
20:00 EEST (UTC+3)	Kiki (yellow card) 15'; Velkovski (red card) 45+2'; Umarbayev (yellow card) 72'	Report	Abel 11'; Dyakov (red card) 45'; Cafú (yellow card) 45+2'; Sasha (yellow card) 69'; Wanderson 74'; Campanharo (yellow card) 78'; Natanael 81'	Stadium: Stadion Lokomotiv; Attendance: 550; Referee: Nikolay Yordanov

12 May 2017 32	Dunav Ruse	2–2	Ludogorets Razgrad	Ruse
17:30 EEST (UTC+3)	Shopov 13'; Budinov (yellow card) 70'; Karagaren 77', (yellow card) 78'; Hubchev (yellow card) 85'; Mujeci (yellow card) 90'	Report	Keșerü 66'; Marcelinho (yellow card) 76'; Milchev 88' (o.g.); Cafú (yellow card) 88'	Stadium: Gradski stadion Attendance: 6,800; Referee: Georgi Kabakov

16 May 2017 33	Levski Sofia	1–3	Ludogorets Razgrad	Sofia
20:00 EEST (UTC+3)	Ognyanov (yellow card) 26'; Jablonský 31'; S. Aleksandrov (yellow card) 47'; Bourabia (yellow card) 53'	Report	Marcelinho 21'; Wanderson 23', 70'; Natanael (yellow card) 52'	Stadium: Vivacom Arena - Georgi Asparuhov; Attendance: 2,400; Referee: Stefan Apostolov

20 May 2017 34	Ludogorets Razgrad	1–1	CSKA Sofia	Razgrad
20:00 EEST (UTC+3)	Dyakov 41'; Abel (yellow card) 85'	Report	Pedro (yellow card) 28'; Karanga 63'; Chorbadzhiyski (yellow card) 84'; Pinto (yellow card) 88'	Stadium: Ludogorets Arena; Attendance: 4,600; Referee: Angel Angelov

28 May 2017 35	Cherno More	1–3	Ludogorets Razgrad	Varna
21:00 EEST (UTC+3)	Kuzma 4'; Minchev (yellow card) 32'; Stanchev (yellow card) 83'	Report	Plastun 16'; Grigorov 32'; Dimitrov 45+2'	Stadium: Stadion Ticha; Attendance: 290; Referee: Petar Dorovski

31 May 2017 36	Ludogorets Razgrad	1–2	Lokomotiv Plovdiv	Razgrad
20:00 EEST (UTC+3)	Vasilev (yellow card) 60'; Shokolarov (yellow card) 71'; Tsvyatkov 86'	Report	Kamburov 32' (pen.); Tunchev (yellow card) 35'; Martinović 69'; Umarbayev (yellow card) 89'; Pirgov (yellow card) 90+2'	Stadium: Ludogorets Arena; Attendance: 490; Referee: Georgi Davidov

=== Bulgarian Cup ===
20 September 2016 First round	Botev Vratsa	0–4	Ludogorets Razgrad	Vratsa
16:00 EEST (UTC+3)	Penev (yellow card) 54'; Mihaylov (yellow card) 55'; Iliev (yellow card) 90+2'	Summary	Sasha 33'; Lukoki (yellow card) 37'; Campanharo 45+1'; Terziev 60'; Abel 90+3' (pen.)	Stadium: Stadion Hristo Botev; Attendance: 750; Referee: Ivaylo Stoyanov

25 October 2016 Second round	Montana	0–4	Ludogorets Razgrad	Razgrad
20:00 EEST (UTC+3)	Dyakov (yellow card) 28'; Steven (yellow card) 83'	Summary	Keșerü 9', 79'; Natanael 32'; Vura 90'	Stadium: Ludogorets Arena; Attendance: 350; Referee: Georgi Davidov

5 April 2017 Quarterfinal	Lokomotiv Plovdiv	0–4	Ludogorets Razgrad	Plovdiv
20:00 EEST (UTC+3)	Kamburov (yellow card) 8'; Velkovski (yellow card) 64'	Summary	Cafú (yellow card) 9'; Natanael (yellow card) 25'; Marcelinho 32'; Wanderson 59'; Vidanov 62' (o.g.); Vura 78'	Stadium: Stadion Lokomotiv; Attendance: 3,800; Referee: Ivaylo Stoyanov

18 April 2017 Semi-final 1st leg	Ludogorets Razgrad	4–0	Litex Lovech	Razgrad
19:00 EEST (UTC+3)	Vura 2', (yellow card) 70'; Campanharo 26'; Vasilev 29'; Quixadá (yellow card) 33', (goal) 34'	Summary	R. Ivanov (yellow card) 15'; Kirilov (yellow card) 36'; Genkov (yellow card) 83'	Stadium: Ludogorets Arena; Attendance: 650; Referee: Stanislav Todorov

27 April 2017 Semi-final 2nd leg	Litex Lovech	0–7 (0–11 agg.)	Ludogorets Razgrad	Lovech
18:00 EEST (UTC+3)	Mitsakov (yellow card) 89'	Summary	João Paulo 12', 52', 82'; Keșerü 24', 68', 90' (pen.); Vura 38'	Stadium: Gradski stadion Attendance: 300; Referee: Georgi Davidov

==== Final ====
24 May 2017	Ludogorets Razgrad	1–2	Botev Plovdiv	Sofia
18:30 EEST (UTC+3)	Moți (yellow card) 25'; Quixadá (yellow card) 76'; Keșerü 80'	Report	Kossoko (yellow card) 32', (goal) 43'; Vutov (yellow card) 50', (goal) 52'; Viana (yellow card) 86' (yellow-red card) 90+2'; Čvorović (yellow card) 90+4'; Genev (yellow card) 90+5'	Stadium: Natsionalen stadion Vasil Levski; Attendance: 9,800; Referee: Nikola Popov

=== UEFA Champions League ===
==== Qualifying phase ====
13 July 2016 2QR 1st leg	Ludogorets Razgrad (Bulgaria)	2–0	(Montenegro) Mladost Podgorica	Razgrad, Bulgaria
20:35 EEST (UTC+3)	Moți 13' (pen.); Lukoki 26'; Marcelinho (yellow card) 43'	Report	Lakić (yellow card) 15'; Bukorac (yellow card) 79'	Stadium: Ludogorets Arena; Attendance: 6,000; Referee: Sergey Lapochkin (Russia)

19 July 2016 2QR 2nd leg	Mladost Podgorica (Montenegro)	0–3 (0–5 agg.)	(Bulgaria) Ludogorets Razgrad	Podgorica, Montenegro
21:45 EEST (UTC+3)	Lakić (yellow card) 21'; Raičević (yellow card) 34'; Đurišić (yellow card) 45+3'; Lazarević (yellow card) 54'	Report	Lukoki 39', 64'; Wanderson 48'	Stadium: Podgorica City Stadium (Note: Mladost Podgorica will play their home match at City Stadium, Podgorica, instead of their regular stadium Stadion FK Mladost, Podgorica.); Attendance: 4,300; Referee: Pol van Boekel (Netherlands)

26 July 2016 3QR 1st leg	Ludogorets Razgrad (Bulgaria)	2–2	(Serbia) Red Star Belgrade	Razgrad, Bulgaria
21:00 EEST (UTC+3)	Marcelinho (yellow card) 15'; Cafú 43'; Keșerü 76'; Moți (yellow card) 83'	Report	Donald (yellow card) 29'; Katai 47'; Kanga 66', (yellow card) 90'; Ibáñez (yellow card) 81'	Stadium: Ludogorets Arena; Attendance: 7,759; Referee: Martin Strömbergsson (Sweden)

2 August 2016 3QR 2nd leg	Red Star Belgrade (Serbia)	2–4 (a.e.t.) (4–6 agg.)	(Bulgaria) Ludogorets Razgrad	Belgrade, Serbia
21:30 EEST (UTC+3)	Donald 17', (yellow card) 45+3'; Kanga (red card) 45+3'; Ibáñez 62' (pen.), (yellow card) 96'; Le Tallec (yellow card) 68'; Ruiz (yellow card) 118'	Report	Abel (yellow card) 9'; Cafú 24'; Wanderson 40', 92', 97', (yellow card) 93'; Plastun (yellow card) 42' (yellow-red card) 44'; Palomino (yellow card) 60'; Vura (yellow card) 105+1'	Stadium: Rajko Mitić Stadium; Attendance: 50,223; Referee: Luca Banti (Italy)

17 August 2016 PO 1st leg	Ludogorets Razgrad (Bulgaria)	2–0	(Czech Republic) Viktoria Plzeň	Sofia (Note: Ludogorets Razgrad played their play-off round home match at Vasil Levski National Stadium, Sofia, instead of their regular stadium Ludogorets Arena, Razgrad.), Bulgaria
21:45 EEST (UTC+3)	Moți 51' (pen.); Cafú (yellow card) 60'; Vura 64'; Sasha (yellow card) 69'	Report	Bakoš (yellow card) 43'; Hubník (yellow card) 50'	Stadium: Vasil Levski National Stadium; Attendance: 11,812; Referee: Mark Clattenburg (England)

23 August 2016 PO 2nd leg	Viktoria Plzeň (Czech Republic)	2–2 (2–4 agg.)	(Bulgaria) Ludogorets Razgrad	Plzeň, Czech Republic
21:45 EEST (UTC+3)	Ďuriš 7', (yellow card) 39'; Hubník (yellow card) 17'; Hořava (yellow card) 30'; Matějů 64'	Report	Vura 17'; Palomino (yellow card) 22'; Cafú (yellow card) 81'; Keșerü 90+5'	Stadium: Doosan Arena; Attendance: 10,312; Referee: Alberto Undiano Mallenco (Spain)

==== Group stage ====
Pos	Team	Pld	W	D	L	GF	GA	GD	Pts	Qualification
1	(England) Arsenal	6	4	2	0	18	6	+12	14	Advance to knockout phase
2	(France) Paris Saint-Germain	6	3	3	0	13	7	+6	12	Advance to knockout phase
3	(Bulgaria) Ludogorets Razgrad	6	0	3	3	6	15	−9	3	Transfer to Europa League
4	(Switzerland) Basel	6	0	2	4	3	12	−9	2	

Source: UEFA
Rules for classification: Group stage tiebreakers

13 September 2016 1	Basel (Switzerland)	1–1	(Bulgaria) Ludogorets Razgrad	Basel, Switzerland
21:45 EEST (UTC+3)	Steffen (yellow card) 65', (goal) 79'	Report	Cafú 45'; Wanderson (yellow card) 67'; Natanael (yellow card) 77'	Stadium: St. Jakob-Park; Attendance: 30,852; Referee: Aleksei Kulbakov (Belarus)

28 September 2016 2	Ludogorets Razgrad (Bulgaria)	1–3	(France) Paris Saint-Germain	Sofia, Bulgaria
21:45 EEST (UTC+3)	Natanael 16', (yellow card) 50'; Dyakov (yellow card) 44'; Cafú (yellow card) 56'	Report	Matuidi 41', (yellow card) 57'; Cavani 56', 60'; Motta (yellow card) 58'	Stadium: Vasil Levski National Stadium; Attendance: 17,155; Referee: Pavel Královec (Czech Republic)

19 October 2016 3	Arsenal (England)	6–0	(Bulgaria) Ludogorets Razgrad	London, England
21:45 EEST (UTC+3)	Sánchez 13'; Walcott 42'; Oxlade-Chamberlain 47'; Özil 56', 83', 87'	Report		Stadium: Emirates Stadium; Attendance: 59,944; Referee: Artur Soares Dias (Portugal)

1 November 2016 4	Ludogorets Razgrad (Bulgaria)	2–3	(England) Arsenal	Sofia, Bulgaria
21:45 EET (UTC+2)	Cafú 12'; Keșerü 15'; Minev (yellow card) 38'	Report	Xhaka 20', (yellow card) 66'; Giroud 41'; Coquelin (yellow card) 59'; Jenkinson (yellow card) 70'; Özil 87'	Stadium: Vasil Levski National Stadium; Attendance: 30,862; Referee: Bas Nijhuis (Netherlands)

23 November 2016 5	Ludogorets Razgrad (Bulgaria)	0–0	(Switzerland) Basel	Sofia, Bulgaria
21:45 EET (UTC+2)	Abel (yellow card) 40'; Moți (yellow card) 84'; Cicinho (yellow card) 90+1'	Report	Balanta (yellow card) 8'; Xhaka (yellow card) 63'; Suchý (yellow card) 81'; Traoré (yellow card) 86'	Stadium: Vasil Levski National Stadium; Attendance: 20,821; Referee: Martin Atkinson (England)

6 December 2016 6	Paris Saint-Germain (France)	2–2	(Bulgaria) Ludogorets Razgrad	Paris, France
21:45 EET (UTC+2)	Motta (yellow card) 17'; Cavani 61'; Di María 90+2'	Report	Vura 15'; Wanderson 69'	Stadium: Parc des Princes; Attendance: 42,650; Referee: Anastasios Sidiropoulos (Greece)

=== UEFA Europa League ===
==== Knockout stage ====
16 February 2017 Round of 32 1st leg	Ludogorets Razgrad (Bulgaria)	1–2	(Denmark) Copenhagen	Sofia, Bulgaria
20:00 EET (UTC+2)	Marcelinho (yellow card) 64'; Keșerü 81'; Dyakov (yellow card) 90+5'	Report	Abel 2' (o.g.); Toutouh (yellow card) 37', (goal) 53'; Greguš (yellow card) 88' (yellow-red card) 90+6'; Kvist (yellow card) 90+1'	Stadium: Vasil Levski National Stadium; Attendance: 14,500; Referee: Ivan Bebek (Croatia)

23 February 2017 Round of 32 2nd leg	Copenhagen (Denmark)	0–0 (2–1 agg.)	(Bulgaria) Ludogorets Razgrad	Copenhagen, Denmark
22:05 EET (UTC+2)	Santander (yellow card) 55'; Ankersen (yellow card) 87'	Report	Abel (yellow card) 34'; Keșerü (yellow card) 39'; Dyakov (yellow card) 90+4'	Stadium: Telia Parken; Attendance: 17,064; Referee: Miroslav Zelinka (Czech Republic)

== Squad statistics ==
As of match played 31 May 2017

=== Appearances and goals ===
No.	Pos	Nat	Player	Total		A Group		Bulgarian Cup		Supercup		Europe	
No.	Pos	Nat	Player	Apps	Goals	Apps	Goals	Apps	Goals	Apps	Goals	Apps	Goals
4	DF	(Brazil) BRA	Cicinho	24	1	18+1	1	2	0	0	0	3	0
5	DF	(Argentina) ARG	José Palomino	41	2	27	2	4	0	0	0	9+1	0
6	DF	(Brazil) BRA	Natanael	43	3	26	1	3	1	0	0	14	1
8	MF	(Brazil) BRA	Lucas Sasha	35	3	19+6	2	3	1	0	0	4+3	0
10	MF	(Brazil) BRA	Gustavo Campanharo	35	4	15+10	2	5+1	2	0	0	0+4	0
11	MF	(Brazil) BRA	Juninho Quixadá	34	4	7+17	3	5+1	1	0	0	1+3	0
12	MF	(Madagascar) MAD	Abel Andrianantenaina	41	2	16+9	1	2+3	1	0	0	9+2	0
14	MF	(Bulgaria) BUL	Slavcho Shokolarov	4	1	3	1	0+1	0	0	0	0	0
17	FW	(Bulgaria) BUL	Tsvetelin Chunchukov	4	0	2+1	0	0+1	0	0	0	0	0
18	MF	(Bulgaria) BUL	Svetoslav Dyakov	39	1	22	1	3	0	0	0	14	0
19	DF	(Bulgaria) BUL	Aleksandar Vasilev	7	1	4+1	0	2	1	0	0	0	0
21	GK	(Bulgaria) BUL	Vladislav Stoyanov	31	0	18	0	0	0	0	0	13	0
22	FW	(Brazil) BRA	Jonathan Cafu	46	14	28+2	10	2	0	0	0	14	4
24	DF	(Bulgaria) BUL	Preslav Petrov	5	0	2	0	1+2	0	0	0	0	0
25	DF	(Bulgaria) BUL	Yordan Minev	25	0	12+1	0	1	0	0	0	11	0
27	DF	(Romania) ROU	Cosmin Moți	38	6	22	4	2	0	0	0	14	2
28	FW	(Romania) ROU	Claudiu Keșerü	47	32	25+5	22	2+2	6	0	0	4+9	4
29	GK	(Bulgaria) BUL	Daniel Naumov	3	0	2	0	1	0	0	0	0	0
32	DF	(Ukraine) UKR	Ihor Plastun	33	2	18+3	2	4	0	0	0	5+3	0
33	GK	(Brazil) BRA	Renan	12	0	9	0	3	0	0	0	0	0
34	MF	(Bulgaria) BUL	Oleg Dimitrov	3	0	3	0	0	0	0	0	0	0
37	FW	(Brazil) BRA	João Paulo	10	4	1+5	1	2	3	0	0	0+2	0
38	MF	(Bulgaria) BUL	Kristiyan Kitov	2	0	2	0	0	0	0	0	0	0
45	MF	(Bulgaria) BUL	Ivaylo Klimentov	2	0	0+1	0	0+1	0	0	0	0	0
51	GK	(Bulgaria) BUL	Vasil Simeonov	1	0	0	0	0+1	0	0	0	0	0
73	DF	(Bulgaria) BUL	Kristiyan Dimitrov	2	1	2	1	0	0	0	0	0	0
76	MF	(Bulgaria) BUL	Serdar Yusufov	1	0	0+1	0	0	0	0	0	0	0
77	DF	(Portugal) POR	Vitinha	6	0	2+2	0	1	0	0	0	0+1	0
80	FW	(Bulgaria) BUL	Denislav Aleksandrov	4	0	2+1	0	0+1	0	0	0	0	0
84	MF	(Bulgaria) BUL	Marcelinho	47	15	30+2	14	2	1	0	0	13	0
85	MF	(Bulgaria) BUL	Atanas Karachorov	1	0	0+1	0	0	0	0	0	0	0
88	MF	(Brazil) BRA	Wanderson	48	20	31	14	3	1	0	0	14	5
92	MF	(Democratic Republic of the Congo) COD	Jody Lukoki	26	4	3+12	1	3+1	0	0	0	3+4	3
93	FW	(Netherlands) NED	Vura	44	8	12+15	1	5+1	4	0	0	8+3	3
97	MF	(Bulgaria) BUL	Tomas Tsvyatkov	2	1	0+2	1	0	0	0	0	0	0
98	MF	(Bulgaria) BUL	Svetoslav Kovachev	3	0	3	0	0	0	0	0	0	0
99	DF	(Bulgaria) BUL	Kristiyan Grigorov	2	1	2	1	0	0	0	0	0	0
Players away from the club on loan:
1	GK	(Canada) CAN	Milan Borjan	10	0	7	0	2	0	0	0	1	0
55	DF	(Bulgaria) BUL	Georgi Terziev	5	1	3	0	2	1	0	0	0	0
Players who appeared for Ludogorets Razgrad that left during the season:
30	MF	(Romania) ROU	Andrei Prepeliță	1	0	0	0	0	0	0	0	0+1	0

=== Goal Scorers ===
Place	Position	Nation	Number	Name	A Group	Bulgarian Cup	Supercup	Europe	Total
1	FW	(Romania)	28	Claudiu Keșerü	22	6	0	4	32
2	MF	(Brazil)	88	Wanderson	14	1	0	5	20
3	MF	(Bulgaria)	84	Marcelinho	14	1	0	0	15
4	FW	(Brazil)	22	Jonathan Cafu	10	0	0	4	14
5	FW	(Netherlands)	93	Vura	1	4	0	3	8
6	DF	(Romania)	27	Cosmin Moți	4	0	0	2	6
7	MF	(Democratic Republic of the Congo)	92	Jody Lukoki	1	0	0	3	4
8	MF	(Brazil)	11	Juninho Quixadá	3	1	0	0	4
8	MF	(Brazil)	10	Gustavo Campanharo	2	2	0	0	4
8	FW	(Brazil)	37	João Paulo	1	3	0	0	4
11	DF	(Brazil)	6	Natanael	1	1	0	1	3
11				Own goal	2	1	0	0	3
13	DF	(Argentina)	5	José Palomino	2	0	0	0	2
13	DF	(Ukraine)	32	Ihor Plastun	2	0	0	0	2
13	MF	(Brazil)	8	Lucas Sasha	1	1	0	0	2
13	MF	(Madagascar)	12	Abel Andrianantenaina	1	1	0	0	2
17	DF	(Brazil)	4	Cicinho	1	0	0	0	1
17	MF	(Bulgaria)	14	Slavcho Shokolarov	1	0	0	0	1
17	MF	(Bulgaria)	18	Svetoslav Dyakov	1	0	0	0	1
17	DF	(Bulgaria)	99	Kristiyan Grigorov	1	0	0	0	1
17	DF	(Bulgaria)	73	Kristiyan Dimitrov	1	0	0	0	1
17	MF	(Bulgaria)	97	Tomas Tsvyatkov	1	0	0	0	1
17	DF	(Bulgaria)	55	Georgi Terziev	0	1	0	0	1
17	DF	(Bulgaria)	19	Aleksandar Vasilev	0	1	0	0	1
TOTALS					87	24	0	23	134

=== Disciplinary record ===
Number	Nation	Position	Name	A Group		Bulgarian Cup		Supercup		Europe		Total	
Number	Nation	Position	Name	Yellow card	Red card	Yellow card	Red card	Yellow card	Red card	Yellow card	Red card	Yellow card	Red card
4	(Brazil)	DF	Cicinho	4	0	0	0	0	0	2	0	6	0
5	(Argentina)	DF	José Palomino	1	0	0	0	0	0	2	0	3	0
6	(Brazil)	DF	Natanael	7	0	1	0	0	0	2	0	10	0
8	(Brazil)	MF	Lucas Sasha	7	0	0	0	0	0	1	0	8	0
10	(Brazil)	MF	Gustavo Campanharo	3	0	0	0	0	0	0	0	3	0
11	(Brazil)	MF	Juninho Quixadá	2	0	2	0	0	0	1	0	5	0
12	(Madagascar)	MF	Abel Andrianantenaina	3	0	0	0	0	0	3	0	6	0
14	(Bulgaria)	MF	Slavcho Shokolarov	1	0	0	0	0	0	0	0	1	0
18	(Bulgaria)	MF	Svetoslav Dyakov	3	1	0	0	0	0	3	0	6	1
19	(Bulgaria)	DF	Aleksandar Vasilev	2	0	0	0	0	0	0	0	2	0
22	(Brazil)	FW	Jonathan Cafu	6	0	1	0	0	0	3	0	10	0
25	(Bulgaria)	DF	Yordan Minev	0	0	0	0	0	0	1	0	1	0
27	(Romania)	DF	Cosmin Moți	6	0	1	0	0	0	2	0	9	0
28	(Romania)	FW	Claudiu Keșerü	5	0	0	0	0	0	1	0	6	0
32	(Ukraine)	DF	Ihor Plastun	2	0	0	0	0	0	2	1	4	1
84	(Bulgaria)	MF	Marcelinho	7	0	0	0	0	0	3	0	10	0
88	(Brazil)	MF	Wanderson	3	0	0	0	0	0	2	0	5	0
92	(Democratic Republic of the Congo)	MF	Jody Lukoki	1	0	1	0	0	0	0	0	2	0
93	(Netherlands)	FW	Vura	3	0	1	0	0	0	1	0	5	0
			TOTALS	66	1	7	0	0	0	27	1	100	2

== Notes ==
1. Ludogorets Razgrad will play their home matches at Vasil Levski National Stadium, Sofia instead of their regular stadium, Ludogorets Arena, Razgrad.
