= 2017 Bulgarian Cup final =

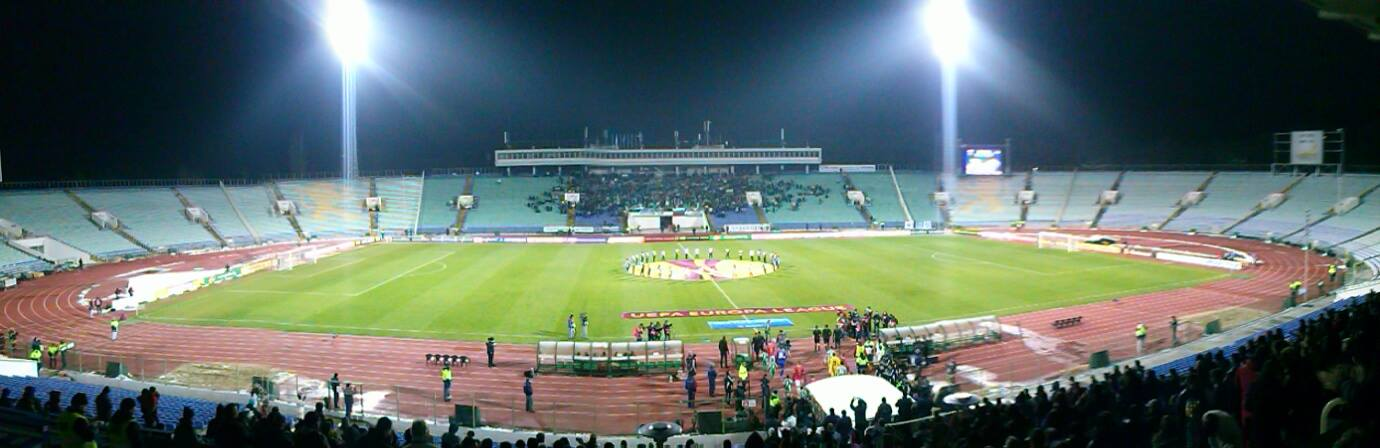
- Event: 2016–17 Bulgarian Cup
Ludogorets	Botev Plovdiv
1	2
- Date: 24 May 2017
- Venue: Vasil Levski, Sofia
- Referee: Nikola Popov (Sofia)
- Attendance: 9,800

The 2017 Bulgarian Cup final was the 77th final of the Bulgarian Cup. The final took place on 24 May 2017 at Vasil Levski National Stadium in Sofia. It was refereed by Nikola Popov, from Sofia.

The clubs contesting the final were Ludogorets Razgrad and Botev Plovdiv. This was the second time the final was contested between these two teams. The first one being in 2014 won by Ludogorets 1-0. Botev won the match 2–1, claiming their third Bulgarian Cup and first since 1981.

== Route to the final ==
Ludogorets			Round	Botev
Opponent	Result	Legs		Opponent	Result	Legs
Botev Vratsa	4–0	away	First round	Pirin Gotse Delchev	6–3	away
Montana	4–0	away	Second round	Neftochimic Burgas	3–0	home
Lokomotiv Plovdiv	4–0	away	Quarter-finals	Pirin Blagoevgrad	1–0	away
Litex Lovech	11–0	4–0 home; 7–0 away	Semi-finals	Vereya	2–1	1–0 away; 1–1 home

== Match ==
=== Details ===
24 May 2017
18:30 EEST

Ludogorets Razgrad	1−2	Botev Plovdiv
Keșerü 80'	Report	Kossoko 44'; Vutov 52'

Vasil Levski National Stadium, Sofia
Attendance: 9,800
Referee: Nikola Popov (Sofia)

Ludogorets	Botev

GK	33	(Brazil) Renan
RB	4	(Brazil) Cicinho
CB	5	(Argentina) José Palomino
CB	27	(Romania) Cosmin Moți	(yellow card) 26'
LB	6	(Brazil) Natanael
DM	18	(Bulgaria) Svetoslav Dyakov (c)
CM	10	(Brazil) Campanharo		(substituted off) 55'
AM	84	(Bulgaria) Marcelinho		(substituted off) 67'
RW	88	(Brazil) Wanderson
LW	93	(Netherlands) Virgil Misidjan
CF	22	(Brazil) Jonathan Cafu		(substituted off) 55'
Substitutes:
GK	29	(Bulgaria) Daniel Naumov
MF	8	(Brazil) Lucas Sasha
FW	11	(Brazil) Juninho Quixadá	(yellow card) 75'	(substituted on) 55'
MF	12	(Madagascar) Anicet		(substituted on) 67'
DF	19	(Bulgaria) Aleksandar Vasilev
FW	28	(Romania) Claudiu Keșerü		(substituted on) 55'
DF	32	(Ukraine) Ihor Plastun
Manager:
(Bulgaria) Georgi Dermendzhiev

GK	99	(Bulgaria) Ivan Čvorović	(yellow card) 90+4'
RB	2	(Bulgaria) Tsvetomir Panov
CB	18	(Bulgaria) Radoslav Terziev
CB	4	(Bulgaria) Viktor Genev	(yellow card) 90+4'
LB	24	(Bulgaria) Lazar Marin
DM	14	(Ivory Coast) Yaya Meledje
CM	17	(Bulgaria) Lachezar Baltanov (c)
AM	20	(France) Omar Kossoko	(yellow card) 32'	(substituted off) 70'
RW	8	(Bulgaria) Todor Nedelev
LW	25	(Bulgaria) Krum Stoyanov		(substituted off) 84'
CF	39	(Bulgaria) Antonio Vutov	(yellow card) 50'	(substituted off) 64'
Substitutes:
GK	21	(Bulgaria) Martin Dimitrov
DF	5	(Bulgaria) Kristian Dimitrov
MF	7	(Brazil) Felipe Brisola		(substituted on) 70'
FW	9	(Brazil) Fernando Viana	(yellow card) 86' (yellow-red card) 90+2'	(substituted on) 64'
MF	10	(Bulgaria) Serkan Yusein		(substituted on) 84'
MF	26	(Bulgaria) Radoslav Apostolov
MF	77	(Bulgaria) Milko Georgiev
Manager:
(Bulgaria) Nikolay Kirov

MATCH OFFICIALS

- Assistant referees: Georgi Todorov & Martin Venev
- Fourth official: Stefan Apostolov (Simitli)

MATCH RULES

- 90 minutes.
- 30 minutes of extra-time if necessary.
- Penalty shoot-out if scores still level.
- Seven named substitutes.
- Maximum of three substitutions.
