= 2018 Bulgarian Supercup =

Финал за Суперкупата на България 2018
Ludogorets	Slavia Sofia
First League	Bulgarian Cup
1	0
- Date: 5 July 2018
- Venue: Trace Arena, Stara Zagora
- Referee: Georgi Kabakov (Plovdiv)
- Attendance: 850
- Weather: Mostly Cloudy; 81 °F (27 °C)

The 2018 Bulgarian Supercup was the 15th Bulgarian Supercup, an annual Bulgarian football match played between the winners of the previous season's First Professional Football League and Bulgarian Cup. The game was played between the champions of the 2017–18 First League, Ludogorets Razgrad, and the 2018 Bulgarian Cup winners, Slavia Sofia.

This was Ludogorets's sixth Bulgarian Supercup appearance and Slavia's first. Ludogorets lost their previous two Supercup appearances in 2015 and 2017.

== Match details ==
5 July 2018
20:30 EEST

Ludogorets Razgrad	1−0	Slavia Sofia
Keșerü 30'	Report

Trace Arena, Stara Zagora
Attendance: 850
Referee: Georgi Kabakov (Plovdiv)

Ludogorets	Slavia

GK	33	(Brazil) Renan
RB	4	(Brazil) Cicinho
CB	30	(Romania) Cosmin Moți
CB	90	(Brazil) Rafael Forster
LB	6	(Brazil) Natanael
CM	10	(Brazil) Gustavo Campanharo	(yellow card) 38'
CM	18	(Bulgaria) Svetoslav Dyakov (c)	(yellow card) 87'
RW	88	(Brazil) Wanderson		(substituted off) 68'
AM	84	(Bulgaria) Marcelinho
LW	93	(Netherlands) Virgil Misidjan		(substituted off) 82'
CF	28	(Romania) Claudiu Keșerü		(substituted off) 65'
Substitutes:
GK	12	(Bulgaria) Daniel Naumov
DF	5	(Bulgaria) Georgi Terziev
MF	8	(Brazil) Lucas Sasha
DF	25	(Bulgaria) Tsvetomir Panov
FW	37	(Brazil) João Paulo		(substituted on) 82'
FW	70	(Poland) Jakub Świerczok		(substituted on) 65'
MF	92	(Democratic Republic of the Congo) Jody Lukoki		(substituted on) 68'
Manager:
(Brazil) Paulo Autuori

GK	32	(Greece) Antonis Stergiakis
RB	25	(Bulgaria) Sasho Aleksandrov	(yellow card) 90'
CB	55	(Bulgaria) Andrea Hristov
CB	38	(Bulgaria) Milen Gamakov	(yellow card) 38'
LB	19	(Bulgaria) Dimitar Velkovski
DM	10	(Bulgaria) Yanis Karabelyov	(yellow card) 90+2'
DM	27	(Bulgaria) Emil Martinov (c)
RM	33	(Bulgaria) Galin Ivanov
CM	8	(Bulgaria) Slavcho Shokolarov		(substituted off) 68'
LM	17	(Bulgaria) Momchil Tsvetanov		(substituted off) 87'
CF	7	(Bulgaria) Milcho Angelov		(substituted off) 75'
Substitutes:
GK	1	(Bulgaria) Georgi Petkov
DF	5	(Bulgaria) Dimitar Burov
FW	9	(Bulgaria) Tsvetelin Chunchukov
FW	14	(Bulgaria) Ivaylo Dimitrov		(substituted on) 75'
DF	15	(Serbia) Aleksandar Stanisavljević
MF	20	(Bulgaria) Filip Krastev		(substituted on) 87'
MF	23	(Bulgaria) Vladislav Uzunov		(substituted on) 68'
Manager:
(Bulgaria) Zlatomir Zagorčić

MATCH OFFICIALS

- Assistant referees:
  - Martin Margaritov (Plovdiv)
  - Martin Venev (Sofia)
- Fourth official: Ivaylo Stoyanov (Petrich)

MATCH RULES

- 90 minutes.
- Penalty shoot-out if scores still level.
- Seven named substitutes, of which three may be used
