= Tomas Tsvyatkov =

Bulgarian footballer (born 1996)

Personal information
- Full name: Tomas Yordanov Tsvyatkov
- Date of birth: 1 June 1997 (age 29)
- Place of birth: Veliko Tarnovo, Bulgaria
- Position: Midfielder

Youth career
- 2006–2010: Etar 1924
- 2010–2013: Litex Lovech
- 2013–2017: Ludogorets Razgrad

Senior career*
Years	Team	Apps	(Gls)
2015–2018	Ludogorets Razgrad II	57	(9)
2017–2018	Ludogorets Razgrad	3	(1)
2018–2020	Litex Lovech	4	(0)
2020	Spartak Varna	0	(0)
Total		64	(10)

International career^{‡}
2012–2013	Bulgaria U17	3	(0)
2014–2016	Bulgaria U19	14	(1)
- * Club domestic league appearances and goals as of 18:09, 15 December 2018 (UTC) ‡ National team caps and goals as of 18:22, 18 April 2017 (UTC)

Tomas Tsvyatkov (Bulgarian: Томас Цвятков; born 1 June 1997) is a Bulgarian footballer who plays as a midfielder.

== Career ==
=== Youth career ===
Tsvyatkov began his career in the local team Etar 1924 when he was nine. He later moved to Litex Lovech academy, before joining Ludogorets Razgrad.

=== Ludogorets Razgrad ===
In 2014 Tsvyatkov was called to train with the first team for first time, together with Oleg Dimitrov. On 28 May 2017 he complete his debut for the team in the First League for the 3:1 win over Cherno More. Three days later, in match against Lokomotiv Plovdiv, he scored his first goal for the team.

Tsvyatkov started the 2017–18 season in Ludogorets II playing in the first match of the season against Lokomotiv 1929 Sofia.

=== Return to Litex ===
In June 2018, Tsvyatkov joined Litex. After 4 matches in 2 years, due to injuries, Tsvyatkov moved to Spartak Varna.

== Career statistics ==
=== Club ===
As of 31 May 2021

Club performance			League		Cup		Continental		Other		Total	
Club	League	Season	Apps	Goals	Apps	Goals	Apps	Goals	Apps	Goals	Apps	Goals
Bulgaria			League		Bulgarian Cup		Europe		Other (Note: Includes Bulgarian Supercup matches.)		Total	
Ludogorets Razgrad II	B Group	2015–16	15	2	–		–		–		15	2
Ludogorets Razgrad II	Second League	2016–17	19	2	–		–		–		19	2
Ludogorets Razgrad II	Second League	2017–18	23	5	–		–		–		23	5
Ludogorets Razgrad II	Total		57	9	0	0	0	0	0	0	57	9
Ludogorets Razgrad	First League	2016–17	2	1	0	0	0	0	—		2	1
Ludogorets Razgrad	First League	2017–18	1	0	0	0	0	0	—		1	0
Ludogorets Razgrad	Total		3	1	0	0	0	0	0	0	3	1
Litex Lovech	Second League	2018–19	4	0	0	0	—		—		4	0
Litex Lovech	Second League	2019–20	0	0	0	0	—		—		0	0
Litex Lovech	Total		4	0	0	0	0	0	0	0	4	0
Spartak Varna	Second League	2019–20	0	0	0	0	—		—		0	0
Career statistics			64	10	0	0	0	0	0	0	64	10
