= Jonathan Cafú =

Brazilian footballer (born 1991)

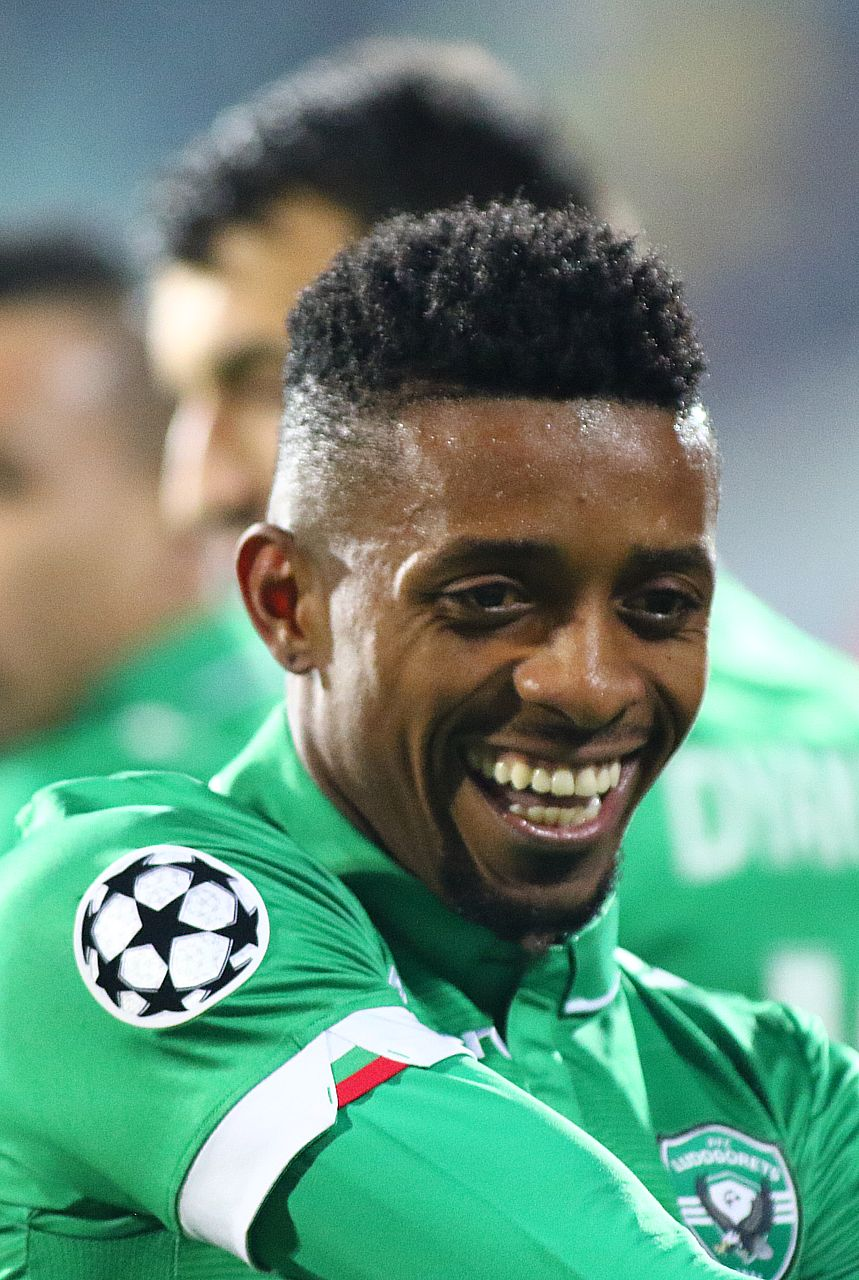
- Cafú with Ludogorets in 2016

Personal information
- Full name: Jonathan Renato Barbosa
- Date of birth: 10 July 1991 (age 35)
- Place of birth: Piracicaba, Brazil
- Height: 1.73 m (5 ft 8 in)
- Positions: Winger; forward

Team information
- Current team: Ponte Preta
- Number: 19

Youth career
- 2008–2010: Rio Claro

Senior career*
Years	Team	Apps	(Gls)
2009–2011	Desportivo Brasil	41	(12)
2011	→ Boavista (loan)	1	(0)
2012–2014	XV de Piracicaba	21	(6)
2013	→ Capivariano (loan)	2	(0)
2014	Ponte Preta	32	(6)
2015	São Paulo	11	(0)
2015	Ludogorets Razgrad II	2	(1)
2015–2017	Ludogorets Razgrad	53	(17)
2017–2020	Bordeaux	22	(2)
2018–2019	→ Red Star Belgrade (loan)	7	(2)
2020	→ Al-Hazem (loan)	15	(2)
2020–2023	Corinthians	3	(0)
2021–2023	→ Cuiabá (loan)	75	(5)
2024	Cuiabá	34	(1)
2025–2026	Botafogo-SP	45	(2)
2026–	Ponte Preta	10	(0)
- * Club domestic league appearances and goals as of 31 October 2026

Jonathan Renato Barbosa (born 10 July 1991), known as Jonathan Cafú or simply Cafú, is a Brazilian professional footballer who plays as either a winger or a forward for Ponte Preta.

== Career ==
=== Brazil ===
Born in Piracicaba, São Paulo, Cafú graduated from Rio Claro's youth setup. He made his senior debuts with Desportivo Brasil in 2009, appearing regularly.

In 2011 Cafú signed for Boavista, but appeared in only one match for the club during his spell (a 1–1 Campeonato Carioca home draw against América-RJ on 19 January). He moved to XV de Piracicaba in the following year, only being regularly used in 2014, after a short loan period at Capivariano.

In April 2014, although being linked to Italian and Japanese clubs, Cafú joined Série B side Ponte Preta. He made his debut for the club on 21 May, starting in a 1–0 home win against Vila Nova.

Cafú appeared in 32 matches for Macaca, scoring six goals (his first being on 31 May, the winner against Boa Esporte), as his side returned to Série A at first attempt. On 14 January 2015, he signed a three-year deal with São Paulo, for a R$ 3 million fee.

=== Ludogorets Razgrad ===
On 27 July 2015, Jonathan Cafú moved abroad to Europe to join Bulgarian side Ludogorets Razgrad for a record club fee of €2.2 million. On 8 August, Cafú played full 90 minutes for Ludogorets's reserve team in a league fixture against Vereya of the B Group. He made his first team debut on 12 September 2015, coming on as a first half substitute in a 0–0 away draw against Beroe Stara Zagora. Cafú eventually appeared in 24 matches for Ludogorets during the season and contributed with 8 goals for the club's 2015-16 A Group title.

In the 2016–17 UEFA Champions League third qualifying round, Cafú scored two goals in the 6–4 overall win against Red Star Belgrade, that propelled Ludogorets into the play-offs of the tournament, the second of which came after a remarkable solo effort in the away match, as Cafú overcame five players of the Serbian team to equalize for 1–1. In the group stage of the tournament, the Brazilian scored the only goal against Basel in the first away match that finished in a 1–1 draw. His good performances continued as he scored a goal and provided an assist to Claudiu Keșerü to give his team a 2–0 lead in the home match against Arsenal, which Ludogorets eventually lost by 2–3. He finished the season scoring 10 goals in 30 league appearances.

=== Girondins Bordeaux ===
In August 2017, Cafú moved to Ligue 1 club Bordeaux for a reported fee of €7.5 million. He was given the number 22 shirt. In January 2018, Cafu along with teammates Malcom and Otávio Henrique Santos faced disciplinary sanctions from the team management after a video was uploaded to Instagram by Malcom. The video had been uploaded shortly after a loss to Caen, which had left the team in danger of relegation from Ligue 1 to Ligue 2. Coach Jocelyn Gourvennec was subsequently sacked.

==== Loan to Red Star Belgrade ====
Cafu joined Red Star Belgrade on a one-year loan deal in August 2018. On 15 September 2018, he scored his first goal for Red Star in a 6–0 home victory against Radnik Surdulica.

==== Loan to Al-Hazem ====
On 28 January 2020, Jonathan Cafú joined Al-Hazem on loan from Bordeaux.

=== Corinthians ===
In the autumn of 2020 Cafú rescinded his contract with Bourdeaux and joined Corinthians on a three-year contract.

== Career statistics ==
As of 7 December 2024

Appearances and goals by club, season and competition
Club	Season	League			State League		Cup		Continental		Other		Total	
Club	Season	Division	Apps	Goals	Apps	Goals	Apps	Goals	Apps	Goals	Apps	Goals	Apps	Goals
Desportivo Brasil	2009	Paulista 2ª Divisão	—		8	0	—		—		—		8	0
Desportivo Brasil	2010	Paulista 2ª Divisão	—		17	8	—		—		—		17	8
Desportivo Brasil	2011	Paulista 2ª Divisão	—		16	4	—		—		—		16	4
Desportivo Brasil	Total		—		41	12	—		—		—		41	12
Boavista (loan)	2011	Carioca	—		1	0	—		—		—		1	0
XV de Piracicaba	2012	Paulista	—		8	1	—		—		12 (Note: Appearance(s) in Copa Paulista)	1	20	2
XV de Piracicaba	2013	Paulista	—		0	0	—		—		21	5	21	5
XV de Piracicaba	2014	Paulista	—		13	5	—		—		—		13	5
XV de Piracicaba	Total		—		21	6	—		—		33	6	54	12
Capivariano (loan)	2013	Paulista A2	—		2	0	—		—		—		2	0
Ponte Preta	2014	Série B	32	6	—		1	1	—		—		33	7
São Paulo	2015	Série A	2	0	9	0	0	0	1 (Note: Appearance(s) in Copa Libertadores)	1	—		12	1
Ludogorets Razgrad II	2015–16	B Group	2	1	—		—		—		—		2	1
Ludogorets Razgrad	2015–16	A Group	22	7	—		1	0	0	0	1 (Note: Appearance(s) in Bulgarian Supercup)	0	24	7
Ludogorets Razgrad	2016–17	A Group	30	10	—		2	0	14 (Note: 12 appearances and four goals in UEFA Champions League, two appearances in UEFA Europa League)	4	—		46	14
Ludogorets Razgrad	2017–18	A Group	1	0	—		0	0	4 (Note: Appearance(s) in UEFA Champions League)	0	—		5	0
Ludogorets Razgrad	Total		53	17	—		3	0	18	4	1	0	75	21
Bordeaux	2017–18	Ligue 1	19	2	—		1	0	0	0	0	0	20	2
Bordeaux	2019–20	Ligue 1	3	0	—		1	0	0	0	0	0	4	0
Bordeaux	Total		22	2	—		2	0	0	0	0	0	24	2
Red Star Belgrade (loan)	2018–19	SuperLiga	7	2	—		1	0	1	0	—		9	2
Al-Hazem (loan)	2019–20	Saudi Professional League	15	2	—		0	0	—		—		15	2
Corinthians	2020	Série A	3	0	—		—		—		—		3	0
Cuiabá (loan)	2021	Série A	29	3	13	3	2	0	—		—		44	6
Cuiabá (loan)	2022	Série A	14	2	—		0	0	0	0	—		14	2
Cuiabá (loan)	2023	Série A	32	0	13	4	1	0	—		5 (Note: Appearance(s) in Copa Verde)	0	51	4
Cuiabá (loan)	2024	Série A	28	1	6	0	3	0	6 (Note: Appearance(s) in Copa Sudamericana)	0	4	2	47	3
Cuiabá (loan)	Total		103	6	32	7	6	0	6	0	9	2	156	15
Career total			239	36	106	25	13	0	26	5	43	8	427	74

== Honours ==
Ludogorets

- Bulgarian First Professional League (2): 2015–16, 2016–17

Red Star Belgrade

- Serbian SuperLiga: 2018–19

Cuiabá

- Campeonato Mato-Grossense: 2021, 2023, 2024

Individual

- Best foreign player in the Bulgarian First League: 2016
