= Serdar Yusufov =

Bulgarian footballer (born 1998)

Personal information
- Full name: Serdar Terikhanov Yusufov
- Date of birth: 2 October 1998 (age 28)
- Place of birth: Targovishte, Bulgaria
- Position: Midfielder

Youth career
- –2013: Svetkavitsa Targovishte
- 2013–2017: Ludogorets Razgrad

Senior career*
Years	Team	Apps	(Gls)
2016–2019	Ludogorets Razgrad II	28	(0)
2017–2019	Ludogorets Razgrad	1	(0)
2019	GS United		
2019–2020	Favoritner AC		

International career
2014–2015	Bulgaria U17		
- * Club domestic league appearances and goals as of 12:05, 30 December 2018 (UTC)

Serdar Yusufov (Bulgarian: Сердар Юсуфов; born 2 October 1998) is a Bulgarian footballer who plays as a midfielder.

== Career ==
=== Ludogorets Razgrad ===
On 28 May 2017, he was called up for the first team in the First League match against Cherno More when he remained on the bench. Three days later he completed his debut, coming as a substitute in the 77th minute in the match against Lokomotiv Plovdiv.

Yusufov started the 2017–18 season in Ludogorets II playing in the first match of the season against Lokomotiv 1929 Sofia.

== Career statistics ==
=== Club ===
As of 13 May 2018

Club performance			League		Cup		Continental		Other		Total	
Club	League	Season	Apps	Goals	Apps	Goals	Apps	Goals	Apps	Goals	Apps	Goals
Bulgaria			League		Bulgarian Cup		Europe		Other (Note: Includes Bulgarian Supercup matches.)		Total	
Ludogorets Razgrad II	B Group	2015–16	1	0	–		–		–		1	0
Ludogorets Razgrad II	Second League	2016–17	0	0	–		–		–		0	0
Ludogorets Razgrad II	Second League	2017–18	15	0	–		–		–		15	0
Ludogorets Razgrad II	Total		16	0	0	0	0	0	0	0	16	0
Ludogorets Razgrad	First League	2016–17	1	0	0	0	0	0	—		1	0
Ludogorets Razgrad	Total		1	0	0	0	0	0	0	0	1	0
Career statistics			17	0	0	0	0	0	0	0	17	0
