= Kristiyan Dimitrov =

Bulgarian footballer

Personal information
- Full name: Kristiyan Dimitrov Dimitrov
- Date of birth: 16 April 1993 (age 33)
- Place of birth: Varna, Bulgaria
- Height: 1.78 m (5 ft 10 in)
- Positions: Right back; winger

Team information
- Current team: Ustrem Donchevo
- Number: 10

Youth career
- Cherno More

Senior career*
Years	Team	Apps	(Gls)
2012–2013	Cherno More	0	(0)
2012	→ Svetkavitsa (loan)	3	(0)
2013	→ Botev Vratsa (loan)	4	(0)
2014–2016	Dobrudzha Dobrich	64	(8)
2016–2017	Ludogorets Razgrad II	27	(0)
2017	Ludogorets Razgrad	2	(1)
2017–2018	Lokomotiv GO	23	(4)
2018	Tsarsko Selo	4	(0)
2019	Dobrudzha Dobrich	4	(0)
2019–	Ustrem Donchevo	?	(6)
- * Club domestic league appearances and goals as of 29 March 2022

Kristiyan Dimitrov (Bulgarian: Кристиян Димитров; born 16 April 1993) is a Bulgarian footballer who plays as a right back for Ustrem Donchevo.

== Career ==
=== Ludogorets Razgrad ===
On 10 June 2016 he joined the Bulgarian champions Ludogorets Razgrad. On 28 May 2017 he completed his debut for the first team in the First League, scoring one of the goals for the 3:1 away win over Cherno More.

In July 2017, Dimitrov moved to Lokomotiv Gorna Oryahovitsa. He left the club in April following a disagreement regarding bonus payments.

== Career statistics ==
=== Club ===
As of 31 May 2017

Club performance			League		Cup		Continental		Other		Total	
Club	League	Season	Apps	Goals	Apps	Goals	Apps	Goals	Apps	Goals	Apps	Goals
Bulgaria			League		Bulgarian Cup		Europe		Other (Note: Includes Bulgarian Supercup matches.)		Total	
Svetkavitsa	B Group	2012–13	3	0	0	0	–		–		3	0
Botev Vratsa	B Group	2013–14	4	0	0	0	–		–		4	0
Dobrudzha Dobrich	B Group	2013–14	10	2	2	0	–		–		12	2
Dobrudzha Dobrich	B Group	2014–15	27	1	1	0	–		–		28	1
Dobrudzha Dobrich	B Group	2015–16	27	5	1	0	–		–		28	5
Dobrudzha Dobrich	Total		64	8	4	0	0	0	0	0	64	8
Ludogorets Razgrad II	Second League	2016–17	27	0	–		–		–		27	0
Ludogorets Razgrad II	Total		27	0	0	0	0	0	0	0	27	0
Ludogorets Razgrad	First League	2016–17	2	1	0	0	0	0	—		2	1
Ludogorets Razgrad	Total		2	1	0	0	0	0	0	0	2	1
Career statistics			100	9	4	0	0	0	0	0	104	9
