= Cicinho (footballer, born 1988) =

Bulgarian-Brazilian footballer

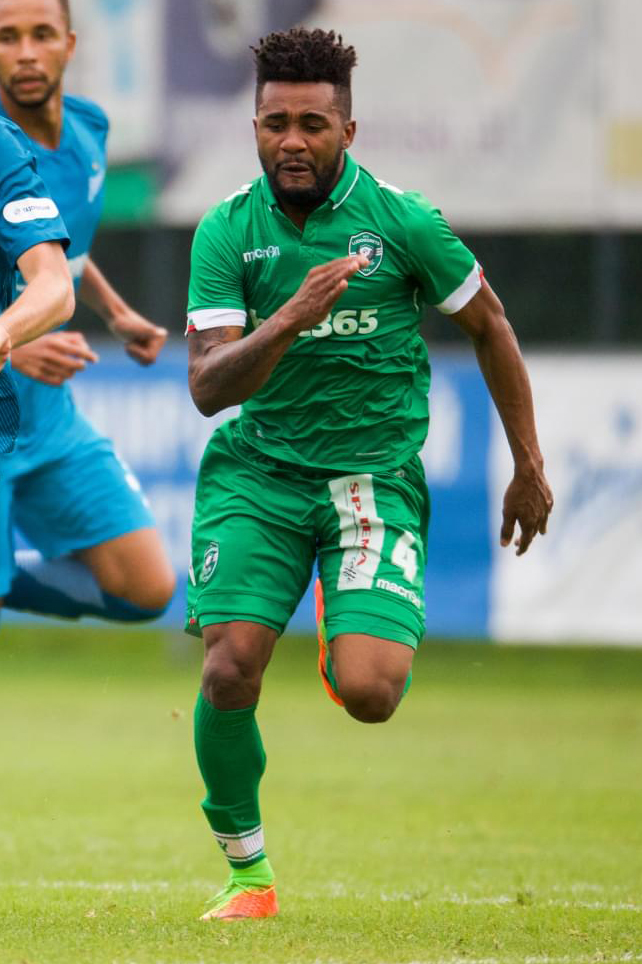
- Cicinho with Ludogorets Razgrad in 2017

Personal information
- Full name: Neuciano de Jesus Gusmão
- Date of birth: 26 December 1988 (age 37)
- Place of birth: Belém, Brazil
- Height: 1.68 m (5 ft 6 in)
- Position: Right back

Team information
- Current team: Castanhal

Youth career
- Remo

Senior career*
Years	Team	Apps	(Gls)
2007–2008	Remo	21	(1)
2009	Juventude	14	(1)
2010–2011	Brasiliense	70	(2)
2012–2013	Ponte Preta	70	(6)
2013–2015	Santos	87	(3)
2015–2022	Ludogorets Razgrad	159	(7)
2023–2024	Bahia	19	(0)
2025	Noroeste	11	(0)
2025–2026	Guarani	16	(0)
2026	Amazonas	1	(0)
2027–	Castanhal	0	(0)

International career^{‡}
2020–2021	Bulgaria	7	(0)
- * Club domestic league appearances and goals as of 10 November 2026 ‡ National team caps and goals as of 28 March 2021

Neuciano de Jesus Gusmão (Bulgarian: Неусиано де Жезуш Гузмао; born 26 December 1988), commonly known as Cicinho (Bulgarian: Сисиньо), is a professional footballer who plays as a right back for Castanhal.

Cicinho made his professional debut aged 19 for Remo, with whom he won two successive Campeonato Paraense championships, before moved to Juventude in December 2008. After Juventude's relegation from the Série B, Cicinho was transferred to Brasiliense, where he won Campeonato Brasiliense in 2011.

In November 2011, Cicinho joined Série A club Ponte Preta. In June 2013 he moved to Santos for a fee of €1.5 million and became an integral member of the club's 2015 Campeonato Paulista title. Two years later, he joined Ludogorets.

== Club career ==
=== Early career ===
Cicinho began his footballing career at hometown's Clube do Remo, and won two state leagues before moving to Juventude in December 2008. He only contributed with 14 appearances (4 in the league), scoring once, and suffered team relegation.

In December 2009, Cicinho signed with Brasiliense. He finished the season with 27 league appearances, suffering another team relegation.

In November 2011, Cicinho rescinded his link with Brasiliense and joined Ponte Preta. He made his Série A debut on 20 May 2012, in a 0–1 home defeat against Atlético Mineiro. He scored his first goal for the club on 5 August, in a 2–1 away win against Cruzeiro.

=== Santos ===
On 26 June 2013, Cicinho signed with Santos in a five-year deal for a fee of €1.5 million. He made his debut for the club on 21 July, coming on as a second half substitute for Leandrinho in a 2–2 home draw against Coritiba.

=== Ludogorets Razgrad ===
On 30 June 2015, Cicinho signed with Bulgarian side Ludogorets Razgrad, for a reported fee of €750,000. He became a mainstay in the Ludogorets first-team, winning the Bulgarian First League title seven times, five of them with fellow Brazilian-born Bulgarians Marcelinho and Wanderson. According to the official Ludogorets site, by May 2022 Cicinho had played 218 matches for the club all competitions and contributed to the team's defensive and attacking phases through a combination of defensive solidity and wing‑back overlaps.

his contributions by competition in his last season for 2022/23, he made 13 league appearances in Parva liga, 2 Bulgarian Cup appearances, and 1 Supercup appearance.

In the 2021/22 campaign, he featured in 24 league games, plus domestic cup and Supercup matches.

=== Bahia ===
On 13 January 2023, Cicinho joined Brasileiro Série A club Bahia on a permanent deal, signing a one-year contract with the club and returning to Brazil after almost eight years.

== International career ==
In May 2018 Cicinho received Bulgarian citizenship, becoming eligible for both Brazil and Bulgaria. On 24 August 2020 he received his first call-up for Bulgaria for the Nations League matches against Republic of Ireland and Wales on 3 and 6 September, respectively, making his debut in the latter game.

== Career statistics ==
=== Club ===
As of 13 March 2023

Club	Season	League			State League		Cup		Continental		Other		Total	
Club	Season	Division	Apps	Goals	Apps	Goals	Apps	Goals	Apps	Goals	Apps	Goals	Apps	Goals
Remo	2007	Série B	3	1	—		—		—		—		3	1
Remo	2008	Série C	5	0	13	0	2	0	—		—		20	0
Remo	Subtotal		8	1	13	0	2	0	—		—		23	1
Juventude	2009	Série B	4	0	10	1	4	0	—		—		18	1
Brasiliense	2010	Série B	27	0	15	2	1	0	—		—		43	2
Brasiliense	2011	Série C	10	0	18	0	3	0	—		—		31	0
Brasiliense	Subtotal		37	0	33	2	4	0	—		—		74	2
Ponte Preta	2012	Série A	32	4	12	0	4	0	—		—		48	4
Ponte Preta	2013	Série A	5	1	21	1	1	0	—		—		27	2
Ponte Preta	Subtotal		37	5	33	1	5	0	—		—		75	6
Santos	2013	Série A	25	2	—		0	0	—		—		25	2
Santos	2014	Série A	33	0	16	0	9	1	—		—		58	1
Santos	2015	Série A	1	0	12	1	4	0	—		—		17	1
Santos	Subtotal		59	2	28	1	13	1	—		—		100	4
Ludogorets II	2015–16	B Group	2	0	—		—		—		—		2	0
Ludogorets	2015–16	A Group	10	0	—		1	0	1 (Note: Appearance(s) in UEFA Champions League)	0	—		12	0
Ludogorets	2016–17	First League	19	1	—		2	0	3	0	—		24	1
Ludogorets	2017–18	First League	23	0	—		1	0	10 (Note: Appearance(s) in UEFA Europa League)	0	1 (Note: Appearance(s) in Bulgarian Supercup)	0	35	0
Ludogorets	2018–19	First League	29	0	—		2	0	14 (Note: Four appearances in UEFA Champions League, ten appearances in UEFA Europa League)	0	1	0	46	0
Ludogorets	2019–20	First League	18	0	—		2	0	13 (Note: One appearance in UEFA Champions League, twelve appearances in UEFA Europa League)	0	1	0	34	0
Ludogorets	2020–21	First League	23	4	—		3	0	6 (Note: Two appearances in UEFA Champions League, four appearances in UEFA Europa League)	0	0	0	32	4
Ludogorets	2021–22	First League	24	1	—		3	0	7 (Note: Three appearances in UEFA Champions League, four appearances in UEFA Europa League)	0	1	0	35	1
Ludogorets	2022–23	First League	13	1	—		2	0	11 (Note: Four appearances in UEFA Champions League, seven appearances in UEFA Europa League)	0	1	0	27	1
Ludogorets	Subtotal		159	7	—		16	0	65	0	5	0	245	7
Bahia	2023	Série A	0	0	4	0	2	0	—		3 (Note: Appearance(s) in Copa do Nordeste)	0	9	0
Career total			306	15	121	5	46	1	65	0	8	0	546	21

=== International ===
As of match played 28 March 2021

Appearances and goals by national team and year
National team	Year	Apps	Goals
Bulgaria	2020	5	0
Bulgaria	2021	2	0
Total		7	0

== Honours ==
=== Club ===
Remo

- Campeonato Paraense: 2007, 2008

Brasiliense

- Campeonato Brasiliense: 2011

Santos

- Campeonato Paulista: 2015

Ludogorets

- Bulgarian First League (7): 2015–16, 2016–17, 2017–18, 2018–19, 2019–20, 2020–21, 2021–22
- Bulgarian Supercup (4): 2018, 2019, 2021, 2022

Bahia

- Campeonato Baiano: 2023

=== Individual ===
- Campeonato Paulista Team of the year: 2014
- Campeonato Paulista Best right-back: 2014
