= Randy Onuoha =

Dutch footballer

Personal information
- Date of birth: 1 April 1994 (age 32)
- Place of birth: Lelystad, Netherlands
- Height: 1.80 m (5 ft 11 in)
- Position: Left back

Team information
- Current team: VVOG
- Number: 17

Youth career
- 2009–2013: Almere City

Senior career*
Years	Team	Apps	(Gls)
2013–2014	ODIN '59		
2014	Chabab		
2015	Ter Leede		
2015–2016	NEC	0	(0)
2016	Fortuna Sittard	0	(0)
2017	Neftochimic Burgas	14	(0)
2018	Huizen		
2019–	VVOG	27	(0)
- * Club domestic league appearances and goals as of 11 March 2022

Randy Onuoha (born 1 April 1994) is a Dutch footballer who plays as a left-back for VVOG.
