= Slavcho Shokolarov =

Bulgarian footballer

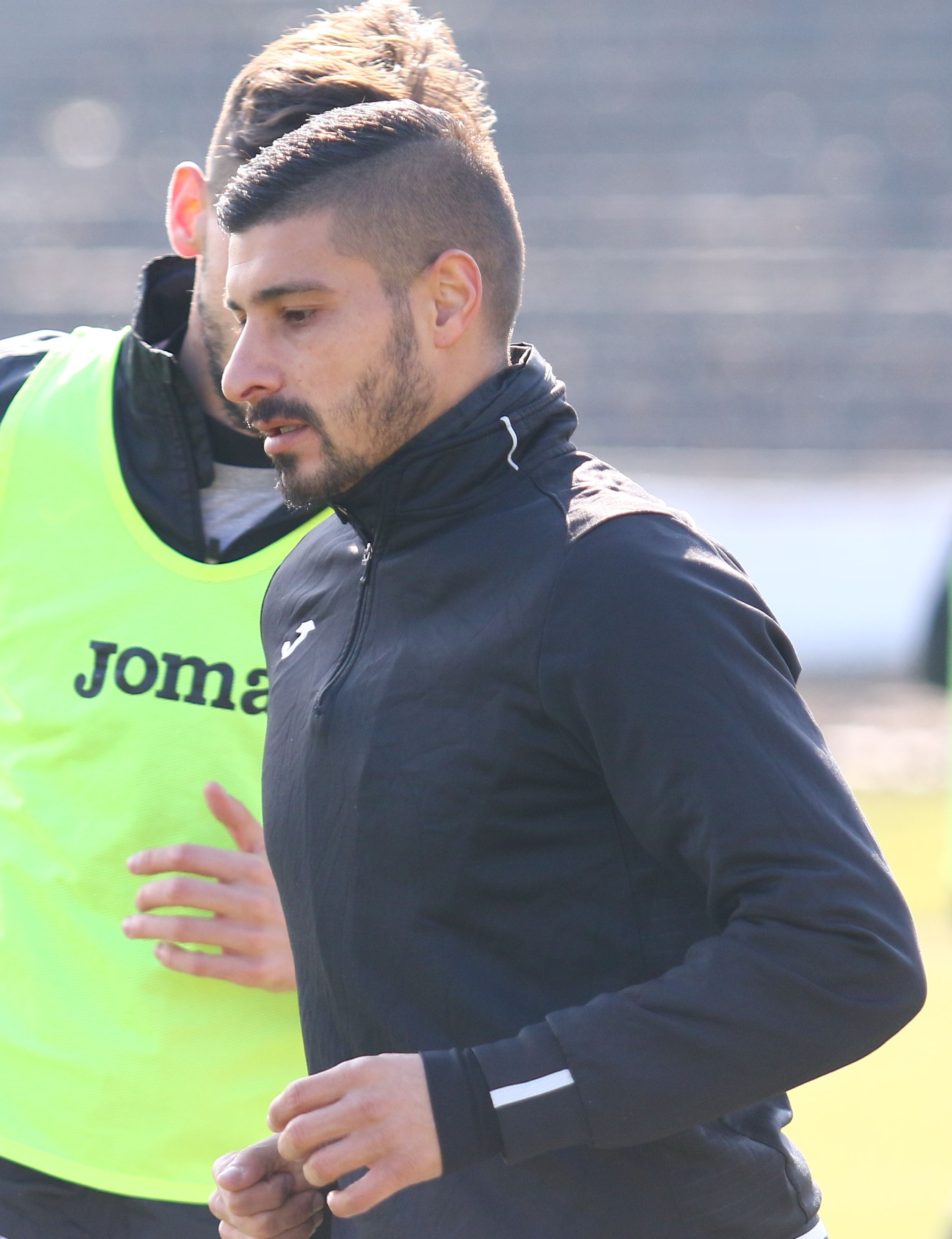

Personal information
- Full name: Slavcho Petrov Shokolarov
- Date of birth: 20 August 1989 (age 37)
- Place of birth: Gotse Delchev, Bulgaria
- Height: 1.74 m (5 ft 9 in)
- Position: Central midfielder

Team information
- Current team: Asenovets II (manager)

Senior career*
Years	Team	Apps	(Gls)
2007–2008	Pirin Gotse Delchev	3	(0)
2008–2012	Svetkavitsa	102	(8)
2013	Montana	12	(0)
2013	Lyubimets 2007	21	(0)
2014	Chernomorets Burgas	11	(1)
2014	Bostancı Bağcıl		
2015	Slavia Sofia	8	(0)
2015–2016	Pomorie	17	(3)
2016–2017	Ludogorets Razgrad II	26	(4)
2016–2017	Ludogorets Razgrad	3	(1)
2017–2019	Slavia Sofia	71	(3)
2020	CSKA 1948	1	(0)
2020–2021	Botev Plovdiv	32	(0)
2021–2022	Asteras Vlachioti	25	(3)
2022–2023	Pirin Blagoevgrad	24	(0)
2023–2024	Dobrudzha	20	(2)

Managerial career
- 2024–: Asenovets II
- * Club domestic league appearances and goals

Slavcho Petrov Shokolarov (Bulgarian: Славчо Петров Шоколаров; born 20 August 1989) is a Bulgarian retired professional footballer who played as a midfielder and now a manager, currently leading Asenovets II.

== Career ==
Shokolarov began his career with Pirin Gotse Delchev before moving to Svetkavitsa in 2008.

After four and a half seasons in Svetkavitsa, his contract was terminated by mutual consent in December 2012 and Shokolarov joined Montana, signing a one-and-a-half-year deal.

=== Ludogorets Razgrad ===
In the summer of 2016, Shokolarov signed with Ludogorets Razgrad II since the team wanted an experienced players in Second League. On 20 August 2016, because Georgi Dermendzhiev decided to give a rest to some of the players before the upcoming Champions League play-off match, he made his debut for the first team of Ludogorets and scored a goal. He left the club on 6 June 2017.

=== Slavia Sofia ===
On 23 June 2017, Shokolarov signed with Slavia Sofia.

=== CSKA 1948 ===
He was part of the CSKA 1948 team between January and late April 2020, appearing in two official games.

== Career statistics ==
As of 27 May 2015

Appearances and goals by club, season and competition
Club	Season	League		Cup		Europe		Total	
Club	Season	Apps	Goals	Apps	Goals	Apps	Goals	Apps	Goals
Pirin Gotse Delchev	2007–08	3	0	1	0	–		4	0
Svetkavitsa	2008–09	23	4	1	0	–		24	4
Svetkavitsa	2009–10	13	0	0	0	–		13	0
Svetkavitsa	2010–11	26	1	2	1	–		28	2
Svetkavitsa	2011–12	28	0	2	0	–		30	0
Svetkavitsa	2012–13	12	3	1	0	–		13	3
Svetkavitsa	Total	102	8	6	1	0	0	108	9
Montana	2012–13	12	0	0	0	–		12	0
Lyubimets 2007	2013–14	21	0	2	0	–		23	0
Chernomorets Burgas	2013–14	11	1	2	0	–		13	1
Slavia Sofia	2014–15	8	0	0	0	–		8	0
Career total		154	9	11	1	0	0	165	10

== Honours ==
Ludogorets Razgrad

- Bulgarian First League: 2016–17

Slavia Sofia

- Bulgarian Cup: 2017–18
