= Claudiu Keșerü =

Romanian footballer (born 1986)

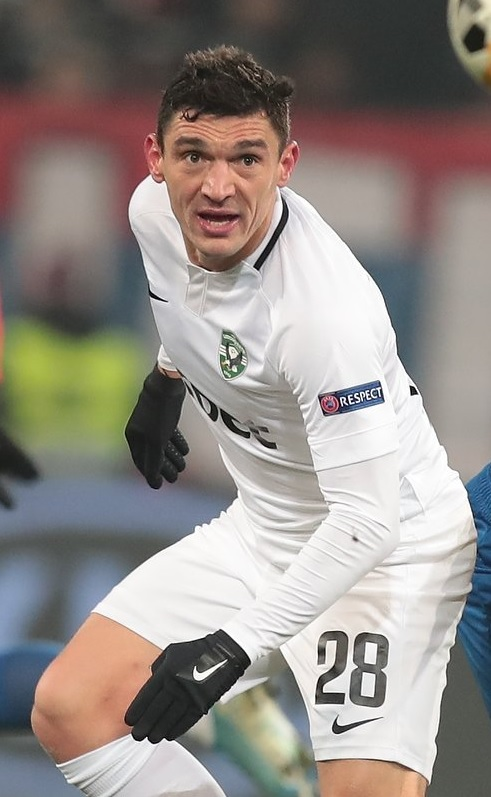
- Keșerü with Ludogorets Razgrad in 2019

Personal information
- Full name: Claudiu Andrei Keșerü
- Date of birth: 2 December 1986 (age 39)
- Place of birth: Oradea, Romania
- Height: 1.78 m (5 ft 10 in)
- Position: Striker

Youth career
- 1992–2002: Bihor Oradea
- 2003–2004: Nantes

Senior career*
Years	Team	Apps	(Gls)
2002–2003	FC Oradea	15	(3)
2003–2007	Nantes B	32	(23)
2003–2010	Nantes	81	(11)
2008	→ Libourne (loan)	17	(11)
2009	→ Tours (loan)	12	(7)
2010	→ Angers (loan)	14	(4)
2010–2013	Angers	100	(33)
2013–2014	Bastia	16	(1)
2014–2015	Steaua București	34	(20)
2015	Al-Gharafa	9	(9)
2015–2021	Ludogorets Razgrad	169	(113)
2021	Ludogorets Razgrad II	3	(3)
2021–2022	FCSB	19	(5)
2022–2023	UTA Arad	26	(3)
2024	Cherno More	15	(6)
Total		562	(252)

International career
2004–2008	Romania U21	21	(6)
2013–2021	Romania	47	(13)

Managerial career
- 2025: Bihor Oradea (sporting director)
- * Club domestic league appearances and goals

Claudiu Andrei Keșerü (Romanian pronunciation: [klaˈudju anˈdrej keˈʃery]; born 2 December 1986) is a Romanian former professional footballer who played as a striker.

After starting out at his hometown side Bihor Oradea, Keșerü soon moved to Nantes in 2003. Over the course of nearly eleven years in France, he represented five clubs and amassed Ligue 1 and Ligue 2 totals of 240 appearances and 67 goals. In 2014, he returned to his native country by signing a contract with defending champions Steaua București.

Keșerü also had a brief spell with Al-Gharafa in Qatar, before moving to Ludogorets Razgrad in the summer of 2015. He netted more than 110 times in the Bulgarian First League and became the foreign player with the most goals in the competition. Keșerü is also the only foreigner to become season top scorer in Bulgaria on more than one occasion. In 2021, he returned to Steaua București—now renamed FCSB.

Keșerü made his first senior international appearance for Romania in October 2013, in a 4–0 defeat of Andorra. He earned over 40 caps for the nation and was part of the squad that participated in UEFA Euro 2016.

== Club career ==
=== Bihor Oradea ===
A youth product of Bihor Oradea, Keșerü was discovered and trained by Alexandru Gergely, former player in the 1970s golden team of FC Bihor. After its promotion in the senior squad, he played a season in the second division for his hometown club and scored 2 goals in 13 matches, as "the Red and Blues" earned promotion to the Liga I. His first match in the latter competition was on 23 August 2003, a goalless draw with Petrolul Ploiești.

=== Nantes ===
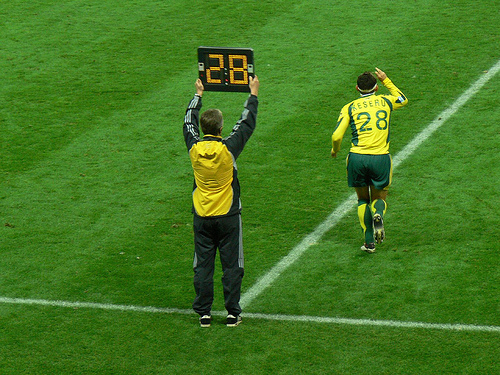
Keșerü on 11 November 2006, coming on as a substitute in a Ligue 1 match against AS Saint-Étienne

In 2003, he was brought to France by Nantes. Initially included in the second team, he was promoted after a season and made his Ligue 1 debut. He played for Nantes for four years, scoring 11 goals in 81 matches. He was relegated with the club to Ligue 2 in 2007 and promoted a year later.

In 2008, Keșerü was loaned by Nantes to the Ligue 2 side Libourne. Mainly a substitute, he scored 11 goals in 17 matches. The following season, he was loaned to another second division side, Tours, where he netted 7 times in 12 matches.

=== Angers ===
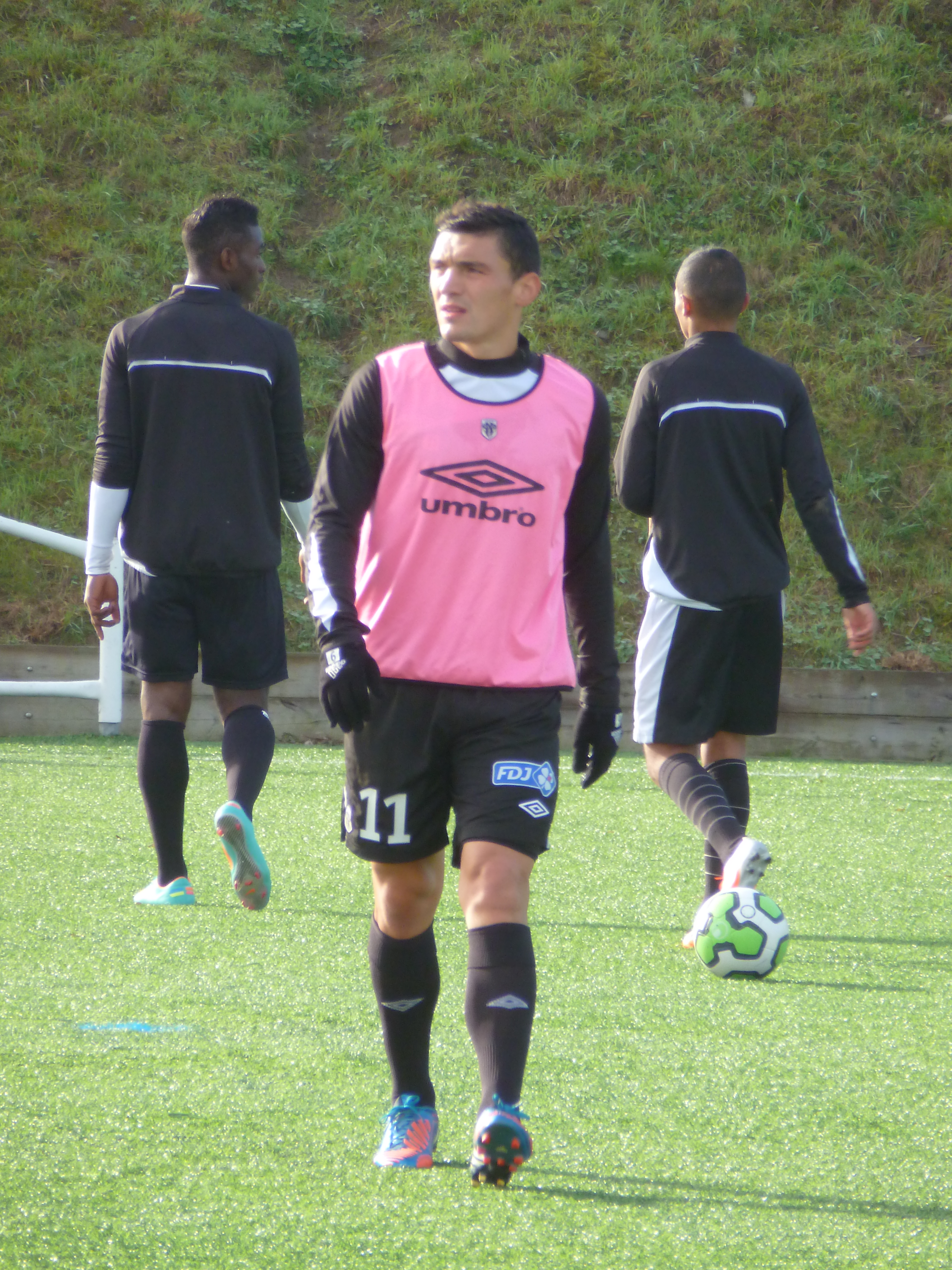
Keșerü training for Angers in 2012

In 2010, Keșerü was loaned by Nantes to Angers. In his first season spent there, he scored 4 goals in 14 matches, and was bought from Nantes after the end of loan period. He spent three years with Angers, imposing himself as a regular starter.

=== Bastia ===
Despite interest from Steaua București and Olympiacos Piraeus, Keșerü remained in France, where he signed with Bastia. On 31 August 2013, he scored his first goal for Bastia in a 2–1 win over Toulouse. He played 16 matches in Ligue 1, but failed to impress, and left the club in the winter of 2014.

=== Steaua București ===
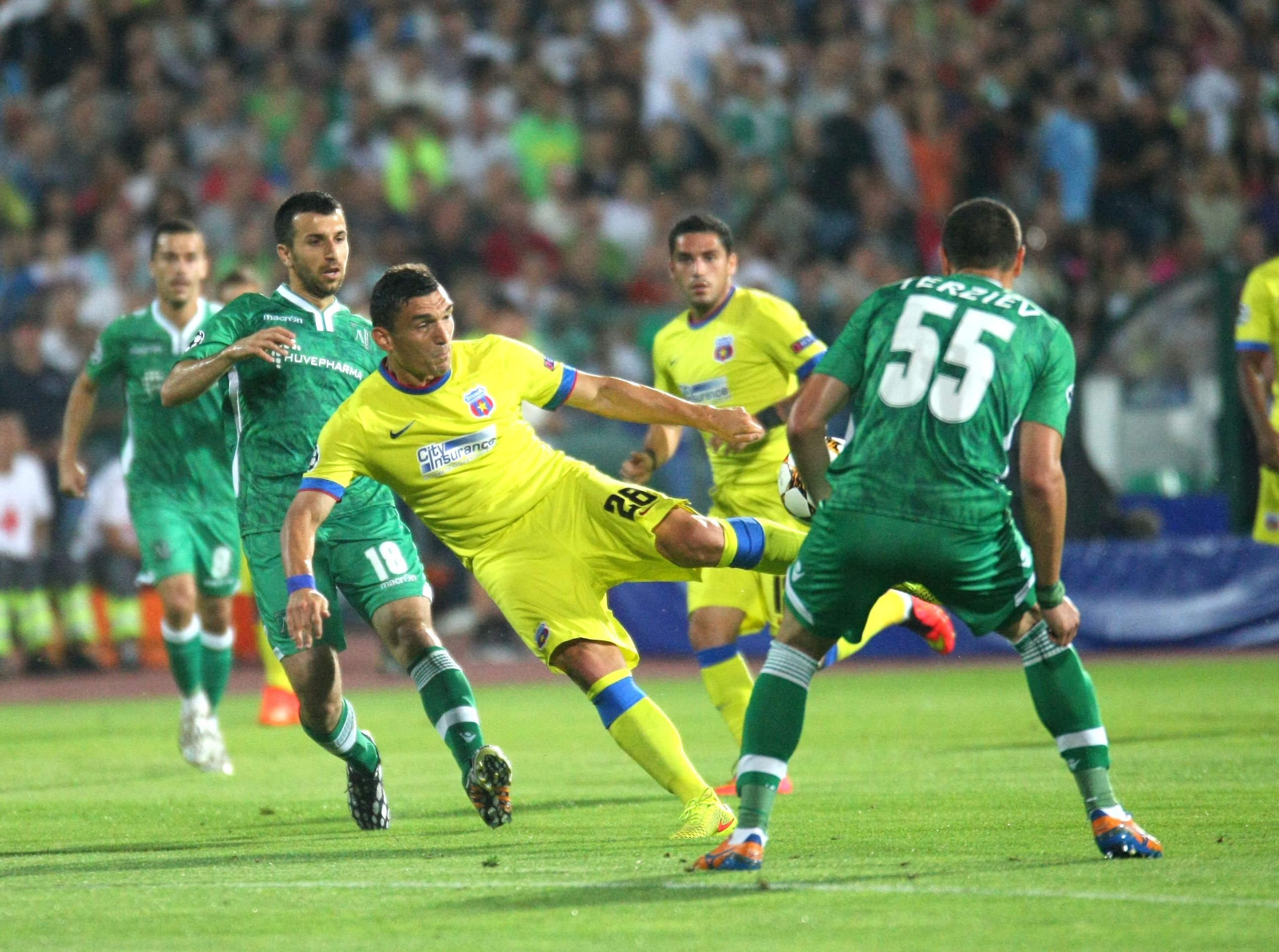
Keșerü playing for Steaua in 2014

In January 2014, Keșerü joined defending Romanian champions Steaua București, with whom he won the league title and played the final of the Romanian Cup. His first goal in a European competition came in the 2–2 draw against Aktobe in UEFA Champions League's third qualifying round.

Keșerü broke the club record for goals in a single game, scoring all six goals in a 6–0 win against Pandurii Târgu Jiu on 15 August 2014. The record was previously held by his coach, Constantin Gâlcă, who scored five times in a 5–0 victory over FC Brașov in 1994. It was the first time that a player scored six goals in a Liga I game since 9 June 1993, when Marian Popa of Farul Constanța accomplished the feat in a 6–3 success against Oțelul Galați. On 18 September 2014, in the first matchday of the Europa League group stage, a 6–0 win over Aalborg, Keșerü netted a hat-trick in just 12 minutes, between the 61st and 72nd minutes, resulting in the fastest hat-trick in the competition's history.

=== Al-Gharafa ===
In February 2015, Keșerü signed with Qatari side Al-Gharafa on a two-and-a-half-year deal.

=== Ludogorets Razgrad ===
Keșerü then signed a three-year contract in August 2015 with Bulgarian club Ludogorets Razgrad worth €700,000 per annum, becoming the highest-paid player ever for The Eagles. In his first season, the team won the championship, and Keșerü became its top striker with 15 goals.

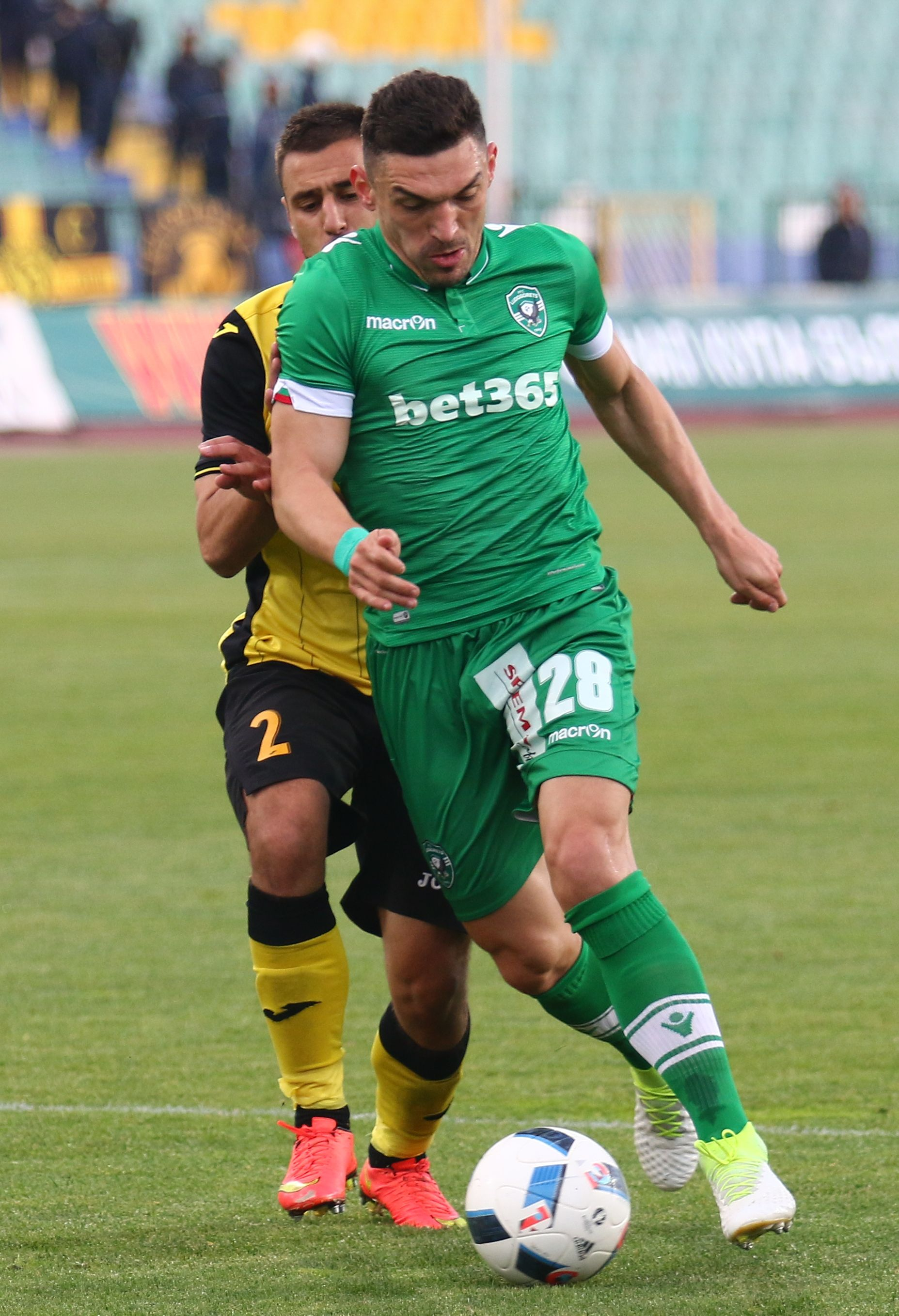
Keșerü in action for Ludogorets in 2017

Keșerü scored an equalizer against Red Star Belgrade in the first leg of third qualifying round of the 2016–17 UEFA Champions League, and then another equalizer in the second leg away match against Viktoria Plzeň in the play-off, helping his team to qualify for the group stage. He scored his maiden goal in the Champions League groups to give a 2–0 lead in the home match against English club Arsenal, but Ludogorets eventually lost by 2–3. On 28 October 2016, Keșerü scored his first hat-trick for Ludogorets in a league match against Dunav Ruse, a feat that he repeated later in the season against Lokomotiv Gorna Oryahovitsa. Eventually, with 22 goals, Keșerü became top goalscorer of the 2016–17 Bulgarian championship and won back-to-back titles with Ludogorets.

Keșerü went on to score two goals in the second leg home match against FK Žalgiris in the second qualifying round of the 2017–18 UEFA Champions League which Ludogorets won 5–3 on aggregate. Keșerü won the Bulgarian championship for a third time in the 2017–18 season, also becoming top goalscorer of the league with 26 goals. He also scored the winning goal in the 2018 Bulgarian Supercup final. On 7 October 2018, he contributed three goals in a 4–1 away win over Botev Vratsa, thus becoming the foreigner with the most hat-tricks in the A PFG, having managed the feat on five occasions. On 19 September 2019, Keșerü scored three goals in the 5:1 home win against CSKA Moscow in a UEFA Europa League group stage match. In May 2020, Keșerü extended his contract with the team for two more years. Prior to the 2021–22 season Keșerü lost his status as a first team regular, not being included among the squad members for Ludogorets' second qualifying round match in the Champions League. He left the team in late August 2021.

=== Return to FCSB ===
After Keșerü terminated his deal with Ludogorets Razgrad, he returned to his native country on 31 August 2021 with Steaua București, now renamed FCSB. On 12 September, he scored in a 6–0 eternal derby thrashing of Dinamo București in the Liga I. He fell out of favour with the club owner, Gigi Becali, and left the club in the summer of 2022.

=== UTA Arad ===
After leaving FCSB, Keșerü signed a two-year contract with fellow Liga I side UTA Arad.

=== Cherno More Varna ===
In August 2024, he made a return to Bulgaria three years after leaving the country, joining Cherno More.

=== Retirement and executive career ===
He retired at the end of the contract with Cherno More in December 2024. In January 2025 he became the new sporting director of Romanian Liga II club Bihor Oradea.

== International career ==
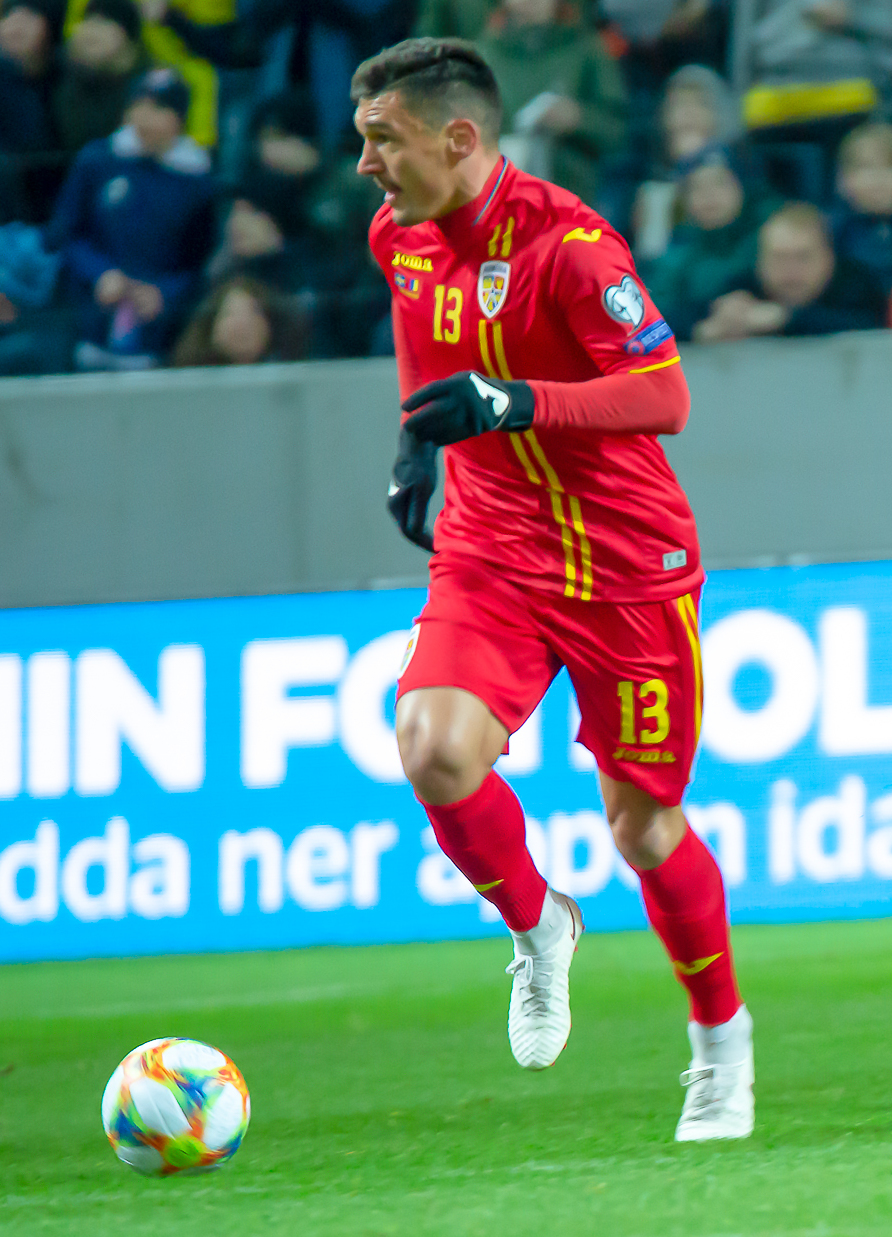
Keșerü playing for Romania in 2019

On 11 October 2013, Keșerü made his full debut for Romania in a 4–0 win against Andorra, scoring the first goal of the match.

He was selected in Romania's squad for UEFA Euro 2016, playing the full 90 minutes in the second group match against Switzerland. This was Keșerü's only appearance of the tournament, as his country finished bottom of the group.

In 2019, Keșerü scored five goals in three games for Romania in matches against Sweden, the Faroe Islands and Norway counting for the UEFA Euro 2020 qualification.

== Personal life ==
Keșerü is of partial Hungarian descent, but cannot speak the language. He has been married since 2012, and in December 2016 his spouse Laura Dorina gave birth to a son.

== Career statistics ==
=== Club ===
Appearances and goals by club, season and competition
Club	Season	League			National cup (Note: Includes Coupe de France, Cupa României, QSL Cup, Bulgarian Cup)		League cup (Note: Includes Coupe de la Ligue, Cupa Ligii, QSL Cup)		Continental		Other		Total	
Club	Season	Division	Apps	Goals	Apps	Goals	Apps	Goals	Apps	Goals	Apps	Goals	Apps	Goals
FC Oradea	2002–03	Divizia B	13	2	0	0	—		—		—		13	2
FC Oradea	2003–04	Divizia A	2	1	—		—		—		—		2	1
FC Oradea	Total		15	3	0	0	0	0	0	0	0	0	15	3
Nantes B	2003–04	Championnat de France Amateur	10	9	—		—		—		—		10	9
Nantes B	2004–05	Championnat de France Amateur	8	3	—		—		—		—		8	3
Nantes B	2005–06	Championnat de France Amateur	6	6	—		—		—		—		6	6
Nantes B	2006–07	Championnat de France Amateur	7	4	—		—		—		—		7	4
Nantes B	2007–08	Championnat de France Amateur	1	1	—		—		—		—		1	1
Nantes B	Total		32	23	0	0	0	0	0	0	0	0	32	23
Nantes	2004–05	Ligue 1	15	3	3	1	1	0	—		—		19	4
Nantes	2005–06	Ligue 1	14	3	2	0	2	0	—		—		18	3
Nantes	2006–07	Ligue 1	22	4	3	2	1	0	—		—		26	5
Nantes	2007–08	Ligue 2	11	0	1	0	2	2	—		—		14	2
Nantes	2008–09	Ligue 1	9	1	0	0	1	0	—		—		10	1
Nantes	2009–10	Ligue 2	10	0	1	0	0	0	—		—		10	0
Nantes	Total		81	11	10	3	7	2	0	0	0	0	98	16
Libourne (loan)	2007–08	Ligue 2	17	11	—		—		—		—		17	11
Tours (loan)	2008–09	Ligue 2	12	7	—		—		—		—		12	8
Angers (loan)	2009–10	Ligue 2	14	4	—		—		—		—		14	4
Angers	2010–11	Ligue 2	35	10	5	1	1	1	—		—		41	12
Angers	2011–12	Ligue 2	33	6	3	2	1	0	—		—		37	8
Angers	2012–13	Ligue 2	32	17	1	0	2	1	—		—		35	18
Angers	Total		114	37	9	3	4	2	0	0	0	0	127	42
Bastia	2013–14	Ligue 1	16	1	0	0	2	0	—		—		18	1
Steaua București	2013–14	Liga I	17	8	2	1	—		—		—		19	9
Steaua București	2014–15	Liga I	17	12	1	0	1	2	9 (Note: Three appearances and one goal in UEFA Champions League, six appearances and four goals in UEFA Europa League)	5	1 (Note: Appearance in Supercupa României)	0	29	19
Steaua București	Total		34	20	3	1	1	2	9	5	1	0	48	28
Al-Gharafa	2014–15	Qatar Stars League	9	9	1	1	—		—		—		10	10
Ludogorets Razgrad	2015–16	A Group	28	15	1	0	—		—		—		29	15
Ludogorets Razgrad	2016–17	Bulgarian First League	30	22	4	6	—		13 (Note: Eleven appearances and three goals in UEFA Champions League, two appearances and one goal in UEFA Europa League)	4	—		47	32
Ludogorets Razgrad	2017–18	Bulgarian First League	30	26	2	2	—		11 (Note: Four appearances and two goals in UEFA Champions League, seven appearances in UEFA Europa League)	2	1 (Note: Appearances in Bulgarian Supercup)	0	44	30
Ludogorets Razgrad	2018–19	Bulgarian First League	35	20	2	0	—		11 (Note: Three appearances and one goal in UEFA Champions League, eight appearances and two goals in UEFA Europa League)	3	1	1	49	24
Ludogorets Razgrad	2019–20	Bulgarian First League	19	12	1	0	—		13 (Note: One appearance in UEFA Champions League, twelve appearances and six goals in UEFA Europa League)	6	1	0	34	18
Ludogorets Razgrad	2020–21	Bulgarian First League	27	18	4	1	—		8 (Note: Two appearances in UEFA Champions League, six appearances and two goals in UEFA Europa League)	1	1	0	40	20
Ludogorets Razgrad	2021–22	Bulgarian First League	0	0	—		—		1 (Note: Appearances in UEFA Champions League)	0	0	0	1	0
Ludogorets Razgrad	Total		169	113	14	9	—		57	16	4	1	244	139
Ludogorets Razgrad II	2021–22	Bulgarian Second League	3	3	—		—		—		—		3	3
FCSB	2021–22	Liga I	19	5	0	0	—		—		—		19	5
UTA Arad	2022–23	Liga I	26	3	6	3	—		—		2 (Note: All appearances in Liga I promotion/relegation play-offs)	0	34	6
Cherno More	2024–25	Bulgarian First League	15	6	1	0	—		—		—		16	6
Career total			562	252	44	20	14	6	66	21	7	1	693	300

=== International ===
Appearances and goals by national team and year
National team	Year	Apps	Goals
Romania	2013	1	1
Romania	2014	2	2
Romania	2015	8	1
Romania	2016	8	1
Romania	2017	4	1
Romania	2018	8	1
Romania	2019	8	6
Romania	2020	3	0
Romania	2021	5	0
Total		47	13

Scores and results list Romania's goal tally first, score column indicates score after each Keșerü goal.

List of international goals scored by Claudiu Keșerü
No.	Date	Venue	Opponent	Score	Result	Competition
1	11 October 2013	Estadi Comunal, Andorra la Vella, Andorra	Andorra	1–0	4–0	2014 FIFA World Cup qualification
2	18 November 2014	Arena Națională, Bucharest, Romania	Denmark	1–0	2–0	Friendly
3	18 November 2014	Arena Națională, Bucharest, Romania	Denmark	2–0	2–0	Friendly
4	29 March 2015	Ilie Oană Stadium, Ploiești, Romania	Faroe Islands	1–0	1–0	UEFA Euro 2016 qualification
5	3 June 2016	Arena Națională, Bucharest, Romania	Georgia	5–1	5–1	Friendly
6	5 October 2017	Ilie Oană Stadium, Ploiești, Romania	Kazakhstan	3–1	3–1	2018 FIFA World Cup qualification
7	17 November 2018	Ilie Oană Stadium, Ploiești, Romania	Lithuania	2–0	3–0	2018–19 UEFA Nations League C
8	23 March 2019	Friends Arena, Solna, Sweden	Sweden	1–2	1–2	UEFA Euro 2020 qualification
9	26 March 2019	Stadionul Dr. Constantin Rădulescu, Cluj, Romania	Faroe Islands	2–0	4–1	UEFA Euro 2020 qualification
10	26 March 2019	Stadionul Dr. Constantin Rădulescu, Cluj, Romania	Faroe Islands	3–0	4–1	UEFA Euro 2020 qualification
11	7 June 2019	Ullevaal Stadion, Oslo, Norway	Norway	1–2	2–2	UEFA Euro 2020 qualification
12	7 June 2019	Ullevaal Stadion, Oslo, Norway	Norway	2–2	2–2	UEFA Euro 2020 qualification
13	12 October 2019	Tórsvøllur, Tórshavn, Faroe Islands	Faroe Islands	3–0	3–0	UEFA Euro 2020 qualification

== Honours ==
Nantes

- Coupe de la Ligue runner-up: 2003–04

Steaua București

- Liga I: 2013–14, 2014–15
- Cupa Romaniei: 2014–15
- Cupa Ligii: 2014–15
- Supercupa României runner-up: 2014

Ludogorets Razgrad

- Bulgarian First League: 2015–16, 2016–17, 2017–18, 2018–19, 2019–20, 2020–21
- Bulgarian Cup runner-up: 2017–18
- Bulgarian Supercup: 2018, 2019

Individual

- UNFP Ligue 2 Team of the Season: 2012–13
- Gazeta Sporturilor Romanian Footballer of the Year runner-up: 2014
- Bulgarian First League top scorer: 2016–17 (22 goals), 2017–18 (26 goals), 2020–21 (18 goals)
- Best foreign player in the Bulgarian First League: 2019

Records

- Ludogorets Razgrad most goals all-time for the club in all competitions: 139
- Ludogorets Razgrad most goals all-time for the club in Bulgarian First League: 113
