= Dimitar Velkovski =

Bulgarian footballer (born 1995)

Personal information
- Full name: Dimitar Valentinov Velkovski
- Date of birth: 22 January 1995 (age 31)
- Place of birth: Vratsa, Bulgaria
- Height: 1.85 m (6 ft 1 in)
- Positions: Left-back; winger

Team information
- Current team: Arda
- Number: 35

Youth career
- 2001–2007: Botev Vratsa
- 2007–2008: Vilafranca
- 2008–2014: Lokomotiv Sofia

Senior career*
Years	Team	Apps	(Gls)
2013–2015	Lokomotiv Sofia	7	(1)
2015–2018	Lokomotiv Plovdiv	75	(1)
2018–2019	Slavia Sofia	41	(2)
2020–2023	Cercle Brugge	44	(0)
2023	Miedź Legnica	14	(0)
2023–2024	Doxa	32	(3)
2024–	Arda	56	(5)

International career^{‡}
2014	Bulgaria U19	4	(0)
2015–2016	Bulgaria U21	6	(0)
2020–	Bulgaria	18	(0)
- * Club domestic league appearances and goals as of 21:03, 5 June 2026 (UTC) ‡ National team caps and goals as of 20:04, 16 November 2026 (UTC)

Dimitar Valentinov Velkovski (Bulgarian: Димитър Валентинов Велковски; born 22 January 1995) is a Bulgarian professional footballer who plays as a left-back or winger for Bulgarian First League club Arda Kardzhali and the Bulgaria national team.

== Club career ==
Velkovski started his career at home-town club Botev Vratsa, joining their youth system as a six-year-old.

In June 2018, Velkovski signed with Slavia Sofia.

On 31 January 2020, he signed a three-and-a-half-year contract with Belgian First Division A side Cercle Brugge.

On 14 February 2023, Velkovski moved to Polish Ekstraklasa side Miedź Legnica, signing a deal until the end of the season.

In July 2024, he returned to Bulgaria, signing a two-year contract with Arda Kardzhali. On 14 August 2025, Velkovski opened the scoring in the 2–0 return leg win over Lithuanian team Kauno Žalgiris in a UEFA Conference League qualifying match, which marked Arda's first home victory in a European club tournament.

== International career ==
Velkovski made his Bulgaria national team debut on 11 October 2020 in a Nations League game against Finland.

== Career statistics ==
=== Club ===
As of 1 February 2020

Appearances and goals by club, season and competition
Club	Season	League			National cup (Note: Includes Bulgarian Cup)		Europe		Other		Total	
Club	Season	Division	Apps	Goals	Apps	Goals	Apps	Goals	Apps	Goals	Apps	Goals
Lokomotiv Sofia	2013–14	A Group	4	0	0	0	—		—		4	0
Lokomotiv Sofia	2014–15	A Group	3	1	2	0	—		—		5	1
Lokomotiv Sofia	Total		7	1	2	0	0	0	0	0	9	1
Lokomotiv Plovdiv	2015–16	A Group	22	0	0	0	—		—		22	0
Lokomotiv Plovdiv	2016–17	Bulgarian First League	20	0	3	2	—		—		23	2
Lokomotiv Plovdiv	2017–18	Bulgarian First League	33	1	2	0	—		—		35	1
Lokomotiv Plovdiv	Total		75	1	5	2	0	0	0	0	80	3
Slavia Sofia	2018–19	Bulgarian First League	28	1	1	0	4 (Note: Appearances in UEFA Europa League)	0	1 (Note: Appearance in Bulgarian Supercup)	0	34	1
Slavia Sofia	2019–20	Bulgarian First League	13	1	2	0	—		—		15	1
Slavia Sofia	Total		41	2	3	0	4	0	1	0	49	2
Cercle Brugge	2019–20	First Division A	1	0	0	0	—		—		1	0
Career total			124	4	10	2	4	0	1	0	139	6

=== International ===
As of match played 16 November 2026

Appearances and goals by national team and year
National team	Year	Apps	Goals
Bulgaria
Bulgaria	2020	3	0
Bulgaria	2021	4	0
Bulgaria	2022	2	0
Bulgaria	2025	1	0
Bulgaria	2026	8	0
Total		18	0
