= Aleksandar Vasilev (footballer, born 1995) =

Bulgarian footballer

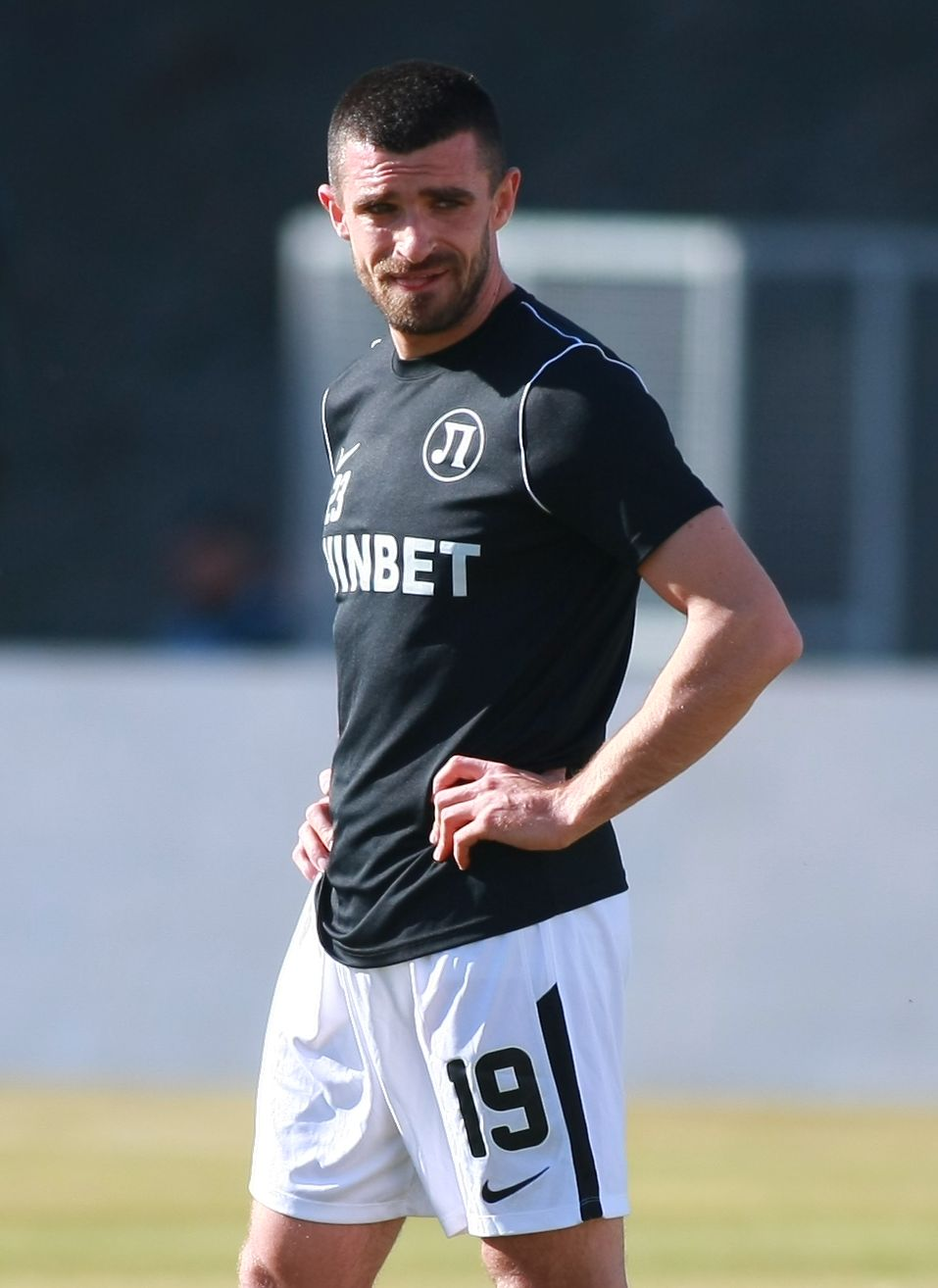
- Vasilev with Lokomotiv Plovdiv

Personal information
- Full name: Aleksandar Veselinov Vasilev
- Date of birth: 27 April 1995 (age 31)
- Place of birth: Strazhitsa, Bulgaria
- Height: 1.68 m (5 ft 6 in)
- Positions: Left-back; left winger

Team information
- Current team: Septemvri Dragoevo

Youth career
- Levski Strazhitsa
- Vidima-Rakovski
- –2012: Chavdar Etropole

Senior career*
Years	Team	Apps	(Gls)
2012–2013	Chavdar Etropole	23	(2)
2013–2014	Kaliakra Kavarna	23	(1)
2014–2018	Ludogorets Razgrad	27	(1)
2015–2018	Ludogorets Razgrad II	28	(4)
2016	→ Beroe Stara Zagora (loan)	15	(1)
2018–2021	Beroe Stara Zagora	93	(1)
2022	Lokomotiv Plovdiv	28	(0)
2023–2024	Cherno More	32	(1)
2025–	Septemvri Dragoevo		
Total		269	(11)

International career
2011–2012	Bulgaria U17	5	(0)
2012–2014	Bulgaria U19	11	(0)
2013–2016	Bulgaria U21	11	(0)
2020	Bulgaria	1	(0)
- * Club domestic league appearances and goals

Aleksandar Veselinov Vasilev (Bulgarian: Александър Веселинов Василев; born 27 April 1995) is a Bulgarian retired professional footballer who played as a left-back or left winger. In 2025 he joined the amateur side Septemvri Dragoevo.

== Club career ==
=== Early career ===
Aleksandar Vasilev started his career playing for his hometown club Levski Strazhitsa. He moved eventually to Vidima-Rakovski, before being invited to join Hristo Stoichkov's academy at Chavdar Etropole. In 2012, he made his professional football debut for Chavdar in the B Group, providing the winning goal for the team in a 1–0 win against Akademik Sofia. In the following season he made 22 appearances for the club, most of them as a substitute. In the summer of 2013 he moved to fellow B Group side Kaliakra Kavarna, where he established himself as a main squad player for the club in the 2013–14 B Group.

=== Ludogorets Razgrad ===
On 6 June 2014 he signed for Ludogorets together with his Bulgaria U19 teammate, Preslav Petrov. On 2 August 2014 Vasilev made his official debut for Ludogorets in an A Group match against Marek Dupnitsa. A year later, on 21 August 2015, he scored his first goal for the team in a 3–0 win against Pirin Blagoevgrad.

==== Loan to Beroe Stara Zagora ====
On 14 June 2016, Vasilev signed for Beroe Stara Zagora on a season long loan deal. He made his debut on 7 August 2016 in a league match against Slavia Sofia, debuting with a goal in a 2–1 win for Beroe. His good performances led him being called-up back by Ludogorets's main squad on 6 January 2017.

==== Return to Ludogorets Razgrad ====
Vasilev returned in play for Ludogorets II on 13 March 2017 in a match against Tsarsko Selo Sofia. On 18 March 2017 he played his first match for the season for Ludogorets in a 2:2 draw against Dunav Ruse. For the Bulgarian Cup match on 18 April 2017 against Litex Lovech, Vasilev played the full match and scored one goal for the 4:0 win.

=== Beroe Stara Zagora ===
On 1 June 2018, Vasilev signed with Beroe Stara Zagora.

=== Retirement ===
Vasilev surprisingly announced his retirement on 5 January 2024 at age of just 28 in order to start his own business, despite the fact he was a starter in Cherno More, which ended 2023 as First League leaders.

In 2025 he joined the newly joined to A Regional League - Shumen team Septemvri Dragoevo.

== International career ==
=== Senior level ===
On 14 March 2017 Vasilev received his first call up for Bulgaria main squad for the match against Netherlands on 25 March 2017. He completed the match on the bench staying as unused substitute for the 2:0 win over Netherlands. On 18 November 2020, Vasilev earned his first cap, coming on as a substitute for Cicinho and playing the last 30 minutes of the 0:0 away draw with Ireland in a Nations League match.

== Career statistics ==
As of 21 February 2019

Appearances and goals by club, season and competition
Club	Season	League			National cup (Note: Includes Bulgarian Cup.)		Continental		Other		Total	
Club	Season	Division	Apps	Goals	Apps	Goals	Apps	Goals	Apps	Goals	Apps	Goals
Chavdar Etropole	2011–12	B Group	1	1	0	0	–		–		1	1
Chavdar Etropole	2012–13	B Group	22	1	1	0	–		–		23	1
Chavdar Etropole	Total		23	2	1	0	0	0	0	0	24	2
Kaliakra Kavarna	2013–14	B Group	23	1	1	0	–		–		24	1
Ludogorets Razgrad	2014–15	A Group	7	0	1	0	0	0	1 (Note: Appearance in Bulgarian Supercup)	0	9	0
Ludogorets Razgrad	2015–16	A Group	9	1	2	0	0	0	0	0	11	1
Ludogorets Razgrad	2016–17	Bulgarian First League	5	0	2	1	0	0	—		7	1
Ludogorets Razgrad	2017–18	Bulgarian First League	6	0	2	0	0	0	—		8	0
Ludogorets Razgrad	Total		27	1	7	1	0	0	1	0	35	2
Ludogorets II	2015–16	B Group	14	2	–		–		–		14	2
Ludogorets II	2016–17	Bulgarian Second League	7	2	–		–		–		7	2
Ludogorets II	2017–18	Bulgarian Second League	7	0	–		–		–		7	0
Ludogorets II	Total		28	4	0	0	0	0	0	0	28	4
Beroe Stara Zagora (loan)	2016–17	Bulgarian First League	20	1	2	1	4	0	–		26	2
Beroe Stara Zagora	2017–18	Bulgarian First League	6	0	0	0	0	0	–		6	0
Beroe Stara Zagora	2018–19	Bulgarian First League	17	1	2	0	0	0	–		19	2
Beroe Stara Zagora	Total		43	2	4	1	4	0	0	0	51	4
Career total			144	10	11	2	4	0	1	0	162	12

== Honours ==
Ludogorets

- Bulgarian First League: 2014–15, 2015–16, 2016–17, 2017–18
- Bulgarian Supercup: 2014
