= Oleg Dimitrov =

Bulgarian footballer (born 1996)

Personal information
- Full name: Oleg Dimitrov Dimitrov
- Date of birth: 6 March 1996 (age 30)
- Place of birth: Kyustendil, Bulgaria
- Height: 1.80 m (5 ft 11 in)
- Position: Midfielder

Team information
- Current team: Kyustendil

Youth career
- Velbazhd Kystendil
- FC Buzludzha
- –2012: CSKA Sofia
- 2012–2015: Ludogorets Razgrad

Senior career*
Years	Team	Apps	(Gls)
2015–2019	Ludogorets Razgrad II	95	(4)
2015–2019	Ludogorets Razgrad	5	(0)
2019–2021	Litex Lovech	43	(1)
2021–2022	Hebar	29	(3)
2022–2023	Etar Veliko Tarnovo	31	(1)
2023–2025	Dunav Ruse	22	(0)
2025–	Kyustendil	0	(0)

International career
2013–2014	Bulgaria U17	3	(0)
2017	Bulgaria U21	1	(0)
- * Club domestic league appearances and goals as of 09:24, 29 January 2025 (UTC)

Oleg Dimitrov (Bulgarian: Олег Димитров; born 6 March 1996) is a Bulgarian footballer who plays as a midfielder for Kyustendil.

== Career ==
=== Youth career ===
Born in Kyustendil, Dimitrov started his career in the local team Velbazhd Kystendil. He became one of the first players to join the newly created team FC Buzlodzha Kyustendil, which later merged with Velbazhd Kyustendil. From Buzlodzha Oleg was attracted to the 31-time champions of Bulgaria - CSKA Sofia. He became a champion with the U17 league. In 2012, he moved to the Bulgarian champions Ludogorets Razgrad.

=== Ludogorets Razgrad ===
In 2012 Dimitrov joined the youth system of Ludogorets Razgrad. In 2014, he played for Ludogorets U19 in the UEFA Youth League, being a titular in all of the 6 matches.

In 2015 Dimitrov became champion with Ludogorets in the U21 league where he served as a vice-captain of the team. He also scored 3 goals in the league.

From the 2015/16 season Ludogorets got the chance to have second team in B Group and Oleg was promoted to the newly created Ludogorets Razgrad II. He made his debut for the team on 2 August 2015 in a match against Pirin Razlog, losing 1:0.

On 23 September 2015 he made his debut for Ludogorets first team in a match against Lokomotiv 1929 Mezdra for the Bulgarian Cup won by Ludogorets by 5:0. He completed his debut for the club in A Group on 27 May 2016 in a match against Botev Plovdiv.

Dimitrov started the 2017–18 season in Ludogorets II playing in the first match of the season against Lokomotiv 1929 Sofia.

== International career ==
=== Youth levels ===
Dimitrov was called up for Bulgaria U21 for a training game against the main national team on 22 February 2017. He made unofficial debut for the team commimg as a substitute in the 1:1 draw. Dimitrov made his official debut on 28 March 2017 in a friendly match against Macedonia U21.

== Statistics ==
=== Club ===
As of 29 May 2019

Club performance			League		Cup		Continental		Other		Total	
Club	League	Season	Apps	Goals	Apps	Goals	Apps	Goals	Apps	Goals	Apps	Goals
Bulgaria			League		Bulgarian Cup		Europe		Other (Note: Includes Bulgarian Supercup matches.)		Total	
Ludogorets Razgrad II	B Group	2015–16	26	1	–		–		–		26	1
Ludogorets Razgrad II	Second League	2016–17	21	2	–		–		–		21	2
Ludogorets Razgrad II	Second League	2017–18	24	1	–		–		–		24	1
Ludogorets Razgrad II	Second League	2018–19	24	0	–		–		–		24	0
Ludogorets Razgrad II	Total		95	4	0	0	0	0	0	0	95	4
Ludogorets Razgrad	A Group	2015–16	1	0	1	0	0	0	0	0	2	0
Ludogorets Razgrad	First League	2016–17	3	0	0	0	0	0	—		3	0
Ludogorets Razgrad	First League	2017–18	1	0	0	0	0	0	—		1	0
Ludogorets Razgrad	Total		5	0	1	0	0	0	0	0	6	0
Career statistics			100	4	1	0	0	0	0	0	101	4

== Honours ==
Ludogorets

- A PFG: 2015–16
