= List of Bulgarian football transfers winter 2025–26 =

This is a list of Bulgarian football transfers for the 2025–26 winter transfer window. Only transfers involving a team from the two professional leagues, First League and Second League are listed.

== First League ==
=== Arda ===
In:

No.	Pos.	Nation	Player
30	FW	MLI	Wilson Samaké (on loan from (Turkish Football Federation) Bandırmaspor)
44	DF	BUL	Martin Paskalev (from (Football Association of Bosnia and Herzegovina) Sarajevo)

Out:

No.	Pos.	Nation	Player
30	FW	BUL	Ivo Kazakov (to Pirin Blagoevgrad)
33	FW	BUL	Ivan Tilev (to Hebar)
45	FW	GNB	Isnaba Mané (loan return to (Portuguese Football Federation) Estoril)
71	MF	BUL	Ivelin Popov (released)

=== Beroe ===
In:

No.	Pos.	Nation	Player
8	MF	ARG	Marco Borgnino (from (Argentine Football Association) CA Alvarado)
12	DF	ESP	David Valverde (from (Royal Spanish Football Federation) Andratx)
13	GK	ESP	Jaume Valens (free agent)
19	FW	GER	Emir Kuhinja (from (German Football Association) 1. FC Magdeburg)
30	DF	URU	Santiago Brunelli (from (Uruguayan Football Association) Rampla Juniors)
32	MF	POR	Francisco Varela (free agent)

Out:

No.	Pos.	Nation	Player
2	DF	ARG	Vicente Longinotti (to (Polish Football Association) LKS Czeluśnica)
8	MF	EQG	Álex Masogo (released)
12	DF	BUL	Martin Georgiev (to Pirin Blagoevgrad)
19	MF	ESP	Carlos Algarra (to Botev Plovdiv)
20	FW	URU	Gianluca Colla (to (Uruguayan Football Association) Deutscher)
21	FW	ESP	Alberto Salido (to Ludogorets)

=== Botev Plovdiv ===
In:

No.	Pos.	Nation	Player
9	FW	MNE	Aleksa Maraš (loan return from (Hellenic Football Federation) Panserraikos)
10	FW	COL	Emerson Rodríguez (on loan from Ludogorets Razgrad)
11	FW	BRA	Pedro Igor (from (Football Federation of Belarus) Dinamo Minsk)
14	MF	ESP	Carlos Algarra (from Beroe)
19	DF	GUI	Antoine Conte (from (Turkish Football Federation) Iğdır)
27	DF	GER	Bryan Hein (free agent)
41	DF	CIV	Zakaria Tindano (on loan from (Turkish Football Federation) Göztepe)
44	FW	POR	Carlos Meotti (from (Portuguese Football Federation) Famalicão)
45	MF	GNB	Edson Silva (from (Cyprus Football Association) Enosis Neon Paralimni)
88	FW	NGA	Chimezie Williams (from (Russian Football Union) Alania Vladikavkaz)

Out:

No.	Pos.	Nation	Player
3	MF	NGA	Emmanuel John (on loan to Spartak Varna)
5	DF	BUL	Martin Georgiev (to Spartak Varna)
6	DF	BUL	Andrey Yordanov (to CSKA Sofia)
9	FW	BUL	Dimitar Mitkov (to (Kazakhstan Football Federation) Ordabasy)
10	FW	BRA	Tales da Silva (on loan to Spartak Varna)
11	FW	BRA	Tailson (on loan to Spartak Varna)
20	FW	BUL	Steven Petkov (to (Royal Spanish Football Federation) Ponferradina)
23	FW	IRL	Armstrong Oko-Flex (to Levski Sofia)
25	MF	NGA	Abraham Ojo (to (Polish Football Association) Raków)
27	MF	BUL	Emil Martinov (to Hebar)
—	FW	NGA	Shola Adelani (on loan to Spartak Pleven)

=== Botev Vratsa ===
In:

No.	Pos.	Nation	Player
2	DF	GAM	Sainey Sanyang (on loan from CSKA Sofia)
6	DF	BEN	Tamimou Ouorou (from (Benin Football Federation) AS Sobemap)
19	FW	BUL	Yoan Bornosuzov (on loan from CSKA Sofia)
20	FW	BEL	Mitchy Ntelo (on loan from (Swiss Football Association) Yverdon-Sport)
22	DF	BUL	Martin Stoychev (on loan from CSKA Sofia)
55	DF	BIH	Đorđe Jovičić (from (Football Association of Bosnia and Herzegovina) Sloga Meridian)
81	FW	COM	Kassim Hadji (from (Lithuanian Football Federation) Žalgiris)
88	MF	BUL	Lazar Boyanov (from Pirin Blagoevgrad)
94	GK	BUL	Marin Orlinov (from CSKA Sofia)

Out:

No.	Pos.	Nation	Player
2	DF	SRB	Nikola Vlajković (released)
4	DF	KOS	Arian Kabashi (to (Romanian Football Federation) Csíkszereda)
5	DF	BUL	Bozhidar Chorbadzhiyski (to (Romanian Football Federation) Hermannstadt)
7	MF	BUL	Bozhidar Penchev (on loan to Yantra Gabrovo)
14	MF	PAN	Romeesh Ivey (to (Venezuelan Football Federation) Estudiantes de Mérida)
16	MF	BUL	Kristiyan Peshov (to Fratria)
20	FW	FRA	Aymen Souda (to (Iraq Football Association) Al-Najaf)
25	GK	BUL	Dimitar Evtimov (to CSKA Sofia)
32	DF	BUL	Martin Dichev (to Pirin Blagoevgrad)
70	MF	BUL	Dilyan Georgiev (to Lokomotiv Gorna Oryahovitsa)
77	DF	BUL	Rosen Marinov (to Spartak Pleven)

=== Cherno More ===
In:

No.	Pos.	Nation	Player
9	FW	ESP	Jorge Padilla (from (Royal Spanish Football Federation) Teruel)

Out:

No.	Pos.	Nation	Player
9	FW	BRA	Gustavo França (loan return to (Brazilian Football Confederation) EC São Bernardo)
11	MF	BRA	João Pedro (to (Brazilian Football Confederation) Brusque)
17	MF	BUL	Martin Milushev (to Pirin Blagoevgrad)
20	MF	BRA	Phellipe Cardoso (to (Turkish Football Federation) İstanbulspor)
99	FW	BRA	Weslen Júnior (to (Football Association of Thailand) Rayong F.C.)

=== CSKA Sofia ===
In:

No.	Pos.	Nation	Player
3	DF	BUL	Andrey Yordanov (from Botev Plovdiv)
10	MF	BLR	Max Ebong (from (Kazakhstan Football Federation) Astana)
25	GK	BUL	Dimitar Evtimov (from Botev Vratsa)
32	DF	ARG	Facundo Rodríguez (on loan from (Argentine Football Association) Estudiantes de La Plata)
38	FW	BRA	Léo Pereira (from (Brazilian Football Confederation) CRB)
77	FW	COL	Alejandro Piedrahita (from (Colombian Football Federation) Deportivo Pereira)
94	MF	CTA	Isaac Solet (from Slavia Sofia)

Out:

No.	Pos.	Nation	Player
1	GK	BRA	Gustavo Busatto (to (Brazilian Football Confederation) Caxias)
3	DF	GAM	Sainey Sanyang (on loan to Botev Vratsa)
8	MF	SWE	David Seger (to (Swedish Football Association) Häcken)
12	GK	BUL	Marin Orlinov (to Botev Vratsa)
13	DF	COL	Brayan Córdoba (to (Colombian Football Federation) Cúcuta Deportivo)
16	MF	BUL	Georgi Chorbadzhiyski (on loan to Lokomotiv Plovdiv)
20	DF	BUL	Martin Stoychev (on loan to Botev Vratsa)
22	FW	ALB	Kevin Dodaj (on loan to (Albanian Football Federation) Vllaznia)
91	FW	BUL	Yoan Bornosuzov (on loan to Botev Vratsa)

=== CSKA 1948 ===
In:

No.	Pos.	Nation	Player
7	MF	POR	Bernardo Couto (from Spartak Varna)
14	FW	BUL	Kaloyan Strinski (from Montana)
23	MF	GER	Florian Krebs (from (Football Association of Finland) Inter Turku)

Out:

No.	Pos.	Nation	Player
9	FW	BRA	Zé Vitor (released)
12	MF	BRA	Luiz Wagner (to (Brazilian Football Confederation) Volta Redonda)
25	MF	GHA	Sharif Osman (to (Turkish Football Federation) Hatayspor)
70	MF	BUL	Stoil Yordanov (to Minyor Pernik)
—	MF	BRA	Thalis (to (Brazilian Football Confederation) Londrina)
—	FW	BRA	Cassiano Bouzon (to (Brazilian Football Confederation) América de Natal, previously on loan to Minyor Pernik)

=== Dobrudzha ===
In:

No.	Pos.	Nation	Player
9	FW	GNB	Valdu Té (from (Portuguese Football Federation) Sintrense)
11	FW	POR	Boubacar Hanne (free agent)
30	MF	POR	Gabriel Carvalho (free agent)
72	DF	POR	Vasco Oliveira (from (Portuguese Football Federation) União de Leiria)
99	FW	BUL	Georgi Trifonov (from Maritsa Plovdiv)

Out:

No.	Pos.	Nation	Player
6	DF	ESP	Ángel Puerto (to (Lithuanian Football Federation) Hegelmann)
8	MF	BRA	Lucas Cardoso (to (Football Association of Indonesia) Malut United)
9	FW	BUL	Milcho Angelov (to Yantra)
10	FW	GHA	Aaron Appiah (released)
30	MF	SVN	Almin Kurtovic (released)
31	FW	BUL	Andrian Dimitrov (to Sevlievo)
77	FW	BUL	Oktay Hamdiev (to Chernomorets Burgas)
88	MF	BUL	Krasian Kolev (to Septemvri Sofia)

=== Levski Sofia ===
In:

No.	Pos.	Nation	Player
6	DF	CRO	Stipe Vulikić (from (Italy) Sampdoria)
9	FW	COL	Juan Perea (from Lokomotiv Plovdiv)
11	FW	IRL	Armstrong Oko-Flex (from Botev Plovdiv)
45	FW	CRO	Marko Dugandžić (free agent)

Out:

No.	Pos.	Nation	Player
6	DF	BRA	Wenderson Tsunami (to (Turkish Football Federation) Iğdır)
7	FW	BRA	Fábio Lima (to (Brazilian Football Confederation) Juventude)
23	MF	SVK	Patrik Myslovič (to (Albanian Football Federation) Tirana)
77	FW	BUL	Borislav Rupanov (to (Polish Football Association) Górnik Zabrze)
88	FW	BUL	Marin Petkov (to (Saudi Arabian Football Federation) Al Taawoun)
—	DF	BUL	Patrik-Gabriel Galchev (to (Football Association of Bosnia and Herzegovina) Željezničar, previously on loan to Lokomotiv Sofia)

=== Lokomotiv Plovdiv ===
In:

No.	Pos.	Nation	Player
9	FW	BUL	Mariyan Vangelov (from Pirin Blagoevgrad)
11	FW	BUL	Zapro Dinev (from Pirin Blagoevgrad)
19	MF	SVN	Miha Trdan (from (Italian Football Federation) Pisa)
29	MF	BUL	Georgi Chorbadzhiyski (on loan from CSKA Sofia)
77	FW	NED	Joël Zwarts (free agent)

Out:

No.	Pos.	Nation	Player
7	FW	BUL	Ivaylo Markov (on loan to Etar)
9	FW	COL	Juan Perea (to Levski Sofia)
11	MF	BUL	Petar Andreev (to Montana)
44	DF	BUL	Nikolay Nikolaev (retired)
—	MF	BUL	Krastyo Banev (released, previously on loan to Etar)

=== Lokomotiv Sofia ===
In:

No.	Pos.	Nation	Player
11	FW	FRA	Adil Taoui (from (Austrian Football Association) LASK)
27	DF	CRO	Ivan Lagundžić (from (Austrian Football Association) Kapfenberg)
42	DF	BUL	Nikola Neychev (from (Football Association of Slovenia) Tabor Sežana)
64	MF	BUL	Dominik Yankov (on loan from (Croatian Football Federation) Rijeka)

Out:

No.	Pos.	Nation	Player
15	DF	BUL	Luka Ivanov (to Slavia Sofia)
27	DF	BUL	Patrik-Gabriel Galchev (loan return to Levski Sofia)
58	MF	BRA	Octávio (to (Brazilian Football Confederation) Maricá)
88	GK	BUL	Zharko Istatkov (to (Swiss Football Association) Langenthal)

=== Ludogorets Razgrad ===
In:

No.	Pos.	Nation	Player
7	FW	ESP	Alberto Salido (from Beroe)
12	FW	BRA	Rwan Cruz (on loan from (Brazil) Botafogo)
27	DF	BRA	Vinícius Nogueira (from (Sweden) Halmstad)

Out:

No.	Pos.	Nation	Player
19	FW	ARG	Matías Tissera (to (Argentina) Instituto, previously on loan to (Argentina) Huracán)
25	FW	COL	Emerson Rodríguez (on loan to Botev Plovdiv)

=== Montana ===
In:

No.	Pos.	Nation	Player
3	DF	SWE	Albin Linnér (from (Football Association of Finland) KTP)
5	DF	BUL	Ivaylo Markov (from (Polish Football Association) Warta Poznań)
13	DF	NED	Jorginho Soares (from (Royal Dutch Football Association) Emmen)
16	DF	ESP	David Carmona (from (Albanian Football Federation) Bylis)
20	FW	GNB	Umaro Baldé (from (Portuguese Football Federation) Cinfães)
21	MF	BUL	Petar Andreev (from Lokomotiv Plovdiv)
24	MF	GRE	Angelos Tsingaras (from (Italian Football Federation) Benevento)
—	FW	NGA	Matthew Kingsley (from (Nigeria Football Federation) Supreme Kings)

Out:

No.	Pos.	Nation	Player
3	DF	MOZ	David Malembana (to Slavia Sofia)
4	DF	BUL	Nikola Borisov (to Etar)
5	DF	BUL	Martin Mihaylov (to Hebar)
12	GK	BUL	Yulian Veskov (on loan to Sportist Svoge)
21	MF	GRE	Ilias Iliadis (released)
22	MF	SWE	Joel Berhane (released)
22	FW	BUL	Kaloyan Strinski (to CSKA 1948)

=== Septemvri Sofia ===
In:

No.	Pos.	Nation	Player
7	FW	POR	Edney Ribeiro (from (Portuguese Football Federation) Amora)
8	MF	BUL	Krasian Kolev (from Dobrudzha)
10	FW	SRB	Stefan Stojanović (on loan from (Football Association of Serbia) Spartak Subotica)
12	GK	BUL	Nikolay Krastev (free agent)
15	DF	SVN	Dominik Ivkič (from (Football Association of Slovenia) Koper)

Out:

No.	Pos.	Nation	Player
6	MF	NGA	Victor Ochayi (to (Israel) F.C. Ashdod)
7	MF	ESP	Moi Parra (to (Royal Spanish Football Federation) Antequera)
10	MF	FRA	Kléri Serber (to (Malta) Hamrun Spartans)
12	GK	BUL	Vladimir Ivanov (on loan to Belasitsa Petrich)
—	MF	BUL	Valentin Dotsev (on loan to Minyor Pernik, previously on loan to Hebar)

=== Slavia Sofia ===
In:

No.	Pos.	Nation	Player
6	DF	BUL	Luka Ivanov (from Lokomotiv Sofia)
15	DF	MOZ	David Malembana (from Montana)

Out:

No.	Pos.	Nation	Player
6	DF	BUL	Martin Georgiev (to (Hellenic Football Federation) AEK Athens)
7	FW	BUL	Denislav Aleksandrov (to Hebar)
8	MF	CTA	Isaac Solet (to CSKA Sofia)
15	DF	RUS	Artyom Varganov (to (Russian Football Union) Kuban)
22	DF	BUL	Ivaylo Naydenov (released)
88	FW	BUL	Toni Tasev (to Belasitsa)

=== Spartak Varna ===
In:

No.	Pos.	Nation	Player
1	GK	BRA	Pedro Victor (from (Portuguese Football Federation) Cinfães)
2	DF	BUL	Boris Ivanov (from Pirin Blagoevgrad)
5	DF	BUL	Dimo Krastev (from (Italian Football Federation) Fiorentina)
6	MF	NGA	Emmanuel John (on loan from Botev Plovdiv)
7	FW	BUL	Petar Prindzhev (from Yambol)
9	FW	BUL	Tsvetelin Chunchukov (from (Kazakhstan Football Federation) Atyrau)
10	MF	POR	Jota Lopes (from (Portuguese Football Federation) AC Vila Meã)
13	FW	BRA	Tales da Silva (on loan from Botev Plovdiv)
29	FW	BRA	Tailson (on loan from Botev Plovdiv)
50	DF	BUL	Martin Georgiev (from Botev Plovdiv)

Out:

No.	Pos.	Nation	Player
1	GK	AUS	Iliya Shalamanov-Trenkov (to (Football Australia) South Melbourne)
2	DF	CRO	Lukas Magđinski (released)
6	MF	BUL	Zhak Pehlivanov (to Hebar)
7	MF	POR	Bernardo Couto (to CSKA 1948)
9	FW	BUL	Daniel Halachev (on loan to Fratria)
13	DF	MAD	Thierno Millimono (to (Polish Football Association) GKS Jastrzębie)
29	FW	LBR	Kolako Johnson (to (Football Federation of Kosovo) Drenica)
93	FW	FRA	Louis Pahama (to (Malta Football Association) Naxxar Lions)

== Second League ==
=== Belasitsa Petrich ===
In:

No.	Pos.	Nation	Player
1	GK	BUL	Vladimir Ivanov (on loan from Septemvri Sofia)
4	DF	BUL	Dincho Yovchev (from Bansko)
8	FW	BUL	Toni Tasev (from Slavia Sofia)
9	FW	BUL	Kaloyan Krastev (from Chernomorets Burgas)
11	DF	BUL	Dimitar Iliev (from Etar)
20	DF	NGA	Daniel Ayomide (on loan from Vihren)
25	GK	BUL	Kostadin Kotev (from Yantra Gabrovo)
26	MF	BUL	Kristiyan Valkov (from Etar)
55	MF	BUL	Aleksandar Yakimov (from Vihren)
77	MF	BUL	Anton Karachanakov (from Vihren)
88	MF	BUL	Petar Karaangelov (from Etar)

Out:

No.	Pos.	Nation	Player
3	DF	BUL	Anton Popov (to Bansko, previously on loan to Septemvri Simitli)
11	MF	BUL	Vasil Bozhinov (to Spartak Pleven)
13	DF	BUL	Atanas Dimitrov (to Pirin Gotse Delchev)
16	MF	BUL	Hristoslav Yachev (to Pirin Razlog, previously on loan to Septemvri Simitli)
21	FW	BUL	Konstantin Yordanov (to CSKA Sofia II)
77	FW	BRA	Tonny Castro (to (Brazilian Football Confederation) Laranja Mecânica)
88	DF	BUL	Milen Gamakov (to Neftochimic)
91	MF	BUL	Viktor Yanev (to Yambol)

=== Chernomorets Burgas ===
In:

No.	Pos.	Nation	Player
6	MF	BUL	Alex Dimitrov (from Neftochimic)
23	MF	GER	Žak Paulo Piplica (from (Croatian Football Federation) Jarun Zagreb)
77	FW	BUL	Oktay Hamdiev (from Dobrudzha)
78	GK	BUL	Dimitar Altanov (from Zagorets)
96	MF	BUL	Dzhaner Sadetinov (from Fratria)
99	FW	BUL	Zhuliyan Ivanov (from Lokomotiv Gorna Oryahovitsa)

Out:

No.	Pos.	Nation	Player
6	MF	BUL	Pavel Georgiev (to Benkovski Isperih)
17	DF	BUL	Mihail Tsonev (on loan to Sevlievo)
21	MF	CMR	Franck Ellé Essouma (to (Iraq Football Association) Al-Mosul)
29	FW	BUL	Kaloyan Krastev (to Belasitsa Petrich)
87	FW	BUL	Stefan Traykov (to Etar)
99	FW	BUL	Todor Chavorski (to Hebar)

=== CSKA Sofia II ===
In:

No.	Pos.	Nation	Player
32	MF	BUL	Konstantin Yordanov (from Belasitsa Petrich)
—	DF	BUL	Plamen Petrov (from Lokomotiv Mezdra)

Out:

No.	Pos.	Nation	Player
14	MF	BUL	Aleksandar Bozhilov (on loan to Sportist Svoge)
22	DF	BUL	Nasko Tsekov (to Pirin Blagoevgrad)

=== Dunav Ruse ===
In:

No.	Pos.	Nation	Player
1	GK	BUL	Mario Mladenov (free agent)
16	MF	BUL	Krasimir Todorov (from (Football Association of Slovenia) Tabor Sežana)
84	MF	GNB	Ivaldo Rufé (from (Portuguese Football Federation) Brito)

Out:

No.	Pos.	Nation	Player
70	MF	BUL	Stefan Statev (to Fratria)

=== Etar ===
In:

No.	Pos.	Nation	Player
11	FW	BUL	Stefan Traykov (from Chernomorets Burgas)
15	DF	BUL	Nikola Borisov (from Montana)
16	MF	BUL	Steliyan Dobrev (from Fratria)
19	FW	BUL	Kristiyan Velichkov (from Vihren)
21	MF	BUL	Ivaylo Markov (on loan from Lokomotiv Plovdiv)

Out:

No.	Pos.	Nation	Player
6	MF	BUL	Plamen Tsonchev (to Spartak Plovdiv)
8	MF	BUL	Petar Karaangelov (to Belasitsa Petrich)
11	DF	BUL	Dimitar Iliev (to Belasitsa Petrich)
18	MF	BUL	Krastyo Banev (loan return to Lokomotiv Plovdiv)
19	FW	BUL	Vasil Vasilev (to Lokomotiv Plovdiv II)
20	MF	BUL	Kristiyan Valkov (to Belasitsa Petrich)
24	FW	BUL	Tonislav Donkov (to Sevlievo)

=== Fratria ===
In:

No.	Pos.	Nation	Player
4	DF	BUL	Kristiyan Peshov (from Botev Vratsa)
19	MF	BUL	Stefan Statev (from Dunav Ruse)
22	FW	BUL	Georgi Atanasov (from Sportist Svoge)
25	FW	BUL	Daniel Halachev (on loan from Spartak Varna)
69	GK	BUL	Iliyan Iliev (from Spartak Pleven)
90	DF	MDA	Vadim Dijinari (from (Moldovan Football Federation) Petrocub)
97	MF	UKR	Tymur Korablin (from (Ukrainian Association of Football) Zorya Luhansk)

Out:

No.	Pos.	Nation	Player
1	GK	UKR	Hennadiy Hanyev (to Sevlievo)
4	DF	UKR	Serhii Chyzhyk (to (Lithuanian Football Federation) FK Be1)
19	DF	BUL	Stoyan Pergelov (to Hebar)
77	FW	BUL	Erik Manolkov (to Slivnishki Geroy)
96	MF	BUL	Dzhaner Sadetinov (to Chernomorets Burgas)
—	MF	BUL	Steliyan Dobrev (to Etar, previously on loan to Sevlievo)

=== Hebar ===
In:

No.	Pos.	Nation	Player
5	DF	BUL	Adrian Vidinov (from Vihren)
8	MF	BUL	Zhak Pehlivanov (from Spartak Varna)
10	FW	BUL	Todor Chavorski (from Chernomorets Burgas)
11	FW	BUL	Denislav Aleksandrov (from Slavia Sofia)
18	DF	BUL	Stoyan Pergelov (from Fratria)
24	MF	BUL	Ivan Avramov (from Lokomotiv Gorna Oryahovitsa)
25	DF	BUL	Ilian Kostov (from Pirin Blagoevgrad)
27	MF	BUL	Emil Martinov (from Botev Plovdiv)
33	FW	BUL	Ivan Tilev (from Arda)
55	DF	BUL	Martin Mihaylov (from Montana)
88	FW	UKR	Ruslan Nepeypiyev (from (Ukrainian Association of Football) FSC Mariupol)

Out:

No.	Pos.	Nation	Player
5	DF	BUL	Tsvetelin Radev (to Yambol)
8	FW	BUL	Nikolay Ganchev (released)
11	MF	BUL	Iliya Rusinov (to Rilski Sportist)
10	MF	BUL	Valentin Dotsev (loan return to Septemvri Sofia)
15	FW	BUL	Svetoslav Dikov (to Marek)
18	DF	BUL	Dimitar Kalchev (to Krumovgrad)
24	MF	BUL	Ivan Avramov (to Sevlievo)
23	DF	BUL	Ivan Dishkov (to Gigant Saedinenie)
24	MF	BUL	Bogomil Bozhurkin (to Krumovgrad)
84	MF	MKD	Hristijan Georgievski (to (Football Association of Slovenia) Jesenice)

=== Lokomotiv Gorna Oryahovitsa ===
In:

No.	Pos.	Nation	Player
5	MF	BUL	Dilyan Georgiev (from Botev Vratsa)
8	DF	BUL	Kristiyan Hristov (from Sportist Svoge)
9	FW	BUL	Ivan Vasilev (from Yantra Gabrovo)
20	FW	TOG	Kevin D'Almeida (from (Football Association of Slovenia) Gorica)
29	MF	BUL	Georgi Stanimirov (from Lovech)
77	DF	BUL	Aleks Chakarov (from Akademik Svishtov)

Out:

No.	Pos.	Nation	Player
4	DF	BUL	David Mihalev (to Sevlievo)
5	DF	BUL	Mihail Minkov (to Sevlievo)
7	MF	BUL	Kaloyan Todorov (to Aksakovo)
8	MF	BUL	Ivan Avramov (to Hebar)
9	FW	BUL	Zhuliyan Ivanov (to Chernomorets Burgas)
17	FW	BUL	Georgi Kolev (to Chernolomets Popovo)

=== Ludogorets Razgrad II ===
In:

No.	Pos.	Nation	Player

Out:

No.	Pos.	Nation	Player

=== Marek ===
In:

No.	Pos.	Nation	Player
5	DF	GER	Matthias Eiba (from (Austrian Football Association) Siegendorf)
6	FW	BUL	Svetoslav Dikov (from Hebar)
10	FW	BUL	Kitan Vasilev (from Vihren)
13	MF	BUL	Veselin Lyubomirov (from Vihren)
19	FW	BUL	Dimitar Goranov (from Vitosha Bistritsa)
23	DF	BUL	Aleksandar Dyulgerov (from Pirin Blagoevgrad)

Out:

No.	Pos.	Nation	Player
2	MF	BUL	Borislav Nikolov (to Minyor Pernik)
5	DF	FRA	Rodrigue Nanitelamio (released)
6	MF	BUL	Vergil Yanev (to Septemvri Simitli)
10	MF	BUL	Dimitar Zakonov (released)
19	MF	FRA	Wilfried Kouakou (released)
55	MF	BUL	Teodor Georgiev (to Levski Karlovo)
94	FW	BUL	Yuliyan Nenov (released)

=== Minyor Pernik ===
In:

No.	Pos.	Nation	Player
2	MF	BUL	Borislav Nikolov (from Marek)
8	MF	BUL	Valentin Dotsev (on loan from Septemvri Sofia)
20	MF	BUL	Mario Danchev (from Levski Sofia II)
24	MF	BUL	Stoil Yordanov (from CSKA 1948)

Out:

No.	Pos.	Nation	Player
8	FW	BRA	Cassiano Bouzon (loan return to CSKA 1948)
19	MF	BUL	Bozhidar Chukanov (to Botev Ihtiman)
20	DF	BUL	Lyuboslav Marinov (released)
25	DF	BUL	Miroslav Yanchev (to Pirin Gotse Delchev)
91	GK	BUL	Aleksandar Mihaylov (to Strumska Slava)

=== Pirin Blagoevgrad ===
In:

No.	Pos.	Nation	Player
1	GK	BUL	Borislav Smilyanski (from Vihren)
4	DF	BUL	Georgi Korichkov (from Vihren)
10	MF	BUL	Martin Milushev (from Cherno More)
11	MF	BUL	Velislav Vasilev (from Yantra Gabrovo)
12	DF	BUL	Martin Dichev (from Botev Vratsa)
17	DF	BUL	Miroslav Georgiev (from (Italian Football Federation) Feralpisalò U19)
18	FW	BUL	Ivo Kazakov (from Arda)
25	DF	BUL	Martin Georgiev (from Beroe)
98	DF	BUL	Nasko Tsekov (from CSKA Sofia II)

Out:

No.	Pos.	Nation	Player
4	DF	BUL	Boris Ivanov (to Spartak Varna)
8	MF	BUL	Lazar Boyanov (to Botev Vratsa)
9	FW	BUL	Mariyan Vangelov (to Lokomotiv Plovdiv)
10	MF	BUL	Mario Ivov (to Vihren)
17	FW	BUL	Zapro Dinev (to Lokomotiv Plovdiv)
25	DF	BUL	Ilian Kostov (to Hebar)
29	FW	BUL	Stanislav Kostov (released)
38	DF	BUL	Aleksandar Dyulgerov (to Marek)
77	FW	BUL	Andrew Petkov (to Strumska Slava)

=== Sevlievo ===
In:

No.	Pos.	Nation	Player
1	GK	UKR	Hennadiy Hanyev (from Fratria)
3	DF	BUL	Mihail Tsonev (on loan from Chernomorets Burgas)
7	DF	BUL	David Mihalev (from Lokomotiv Gorna Oryahovitsa)
8	MF	BUL	Ivan Avramov (from Hebar)
16	MF	BUL	Nikolay Yankov (from Akademik Svishtov)
24	FW	BUL	Preslav Antonov (from Spartak Pleven)
29	FW	SOM	Ayuub Ahmed-Nur (from (Football Association of Finland) PK-35)
31	FW	BUL	Andrian Dimitrov (from Dobrudzha)
33	FW	BUL	Tonislav Donkov (from Etar)
55	DF	BUL	Mihail Minkov (from Lokomotiv Gorna Oryahovitsa)

Out:

No.	Pos.	Nation	Player
1	GK	BUL	Nikola Zlatinov (to Sportist Svoge)
3	DF	BUL	Nasko Yankov (to Chernolomets Popovo)
4	DF	SEN	Papa Mamadou Seck (released)
7	MF	BUL	Zhoro Roshkov (to Bansko)
10	MF	COL	Santiago Montoya (released)
16	MF	BUL	Steliyan Dobrev (loan return to Fratria)
17	DF	BUL	Nikola Borisov (released)
29	FW	BUL	Yusein Kasov (to Maritsa Plovdiv)
76	GK	BUL	Hristo Lalev (to Yantra Gabrovo)

=== Spartak Pleven ===
In:

No.	Pos.	Nation	Player
7	MF	BUL	Vasil Bozhinov (from Belasitsa Petrich)
8	DF	BUL	Rosen Marinov (on loan from Botev Vratsa)
14	MF	BRA	Cleiton Thiesen (from Bdin Vidin)
15	FW	FRA	Abdul Fofana (from (Swiss Football Association) La Chaux-de-Fonds)
24	FW	NGA	Shola Adelani (on loan from Botev Plovdiv)
27	MF	STP	Adjeil Neves (from Bansko)
86	GK	BUL	Petar Petrov (from Sportist Svoge)

Out:

No.	Pos.	Nation	Player
7	MF	PLE	Monir Al Badarin (to Vihren)
8	MF	BUL	Kristo Yanachkov (to Chernomorets Balchik)
14	FW	BUL	Ivelin Nikolaev (to Levski 2007)
24	FW	BUL	Preslav Antonov (to Sevlievo)
86	GK	BUL	Iliyan Iliev (to Fratria)

=== Sportist Svoge ===
In:

No.	Pos.	Nation	Player
1	GK	BUL	Nikola Zlatinov (from Sevlievo)
7	MF	BUL	Aleksandar Bozhilov (on loan from CSKA Sofia II)
10	FW	BUL	Kristiyan Yovov (on loan from Levski Sofia II)
11	FW	BRA	Yuri Pinheiro (from Vihren, previously on loan)
14	FW	BUL	Dimitar Nikolov (from Yambol)
33	GK	BUL	Yulian Veskov (on loan from Montana)
99	DF	GRE	Christos Mitsis (from (Cyprus Football Association) Chalkanoras Idaliou)

Out:

No.	Pos.	Nation	Player
1	GK	BUL	Petar Petrov (to Spartak Pleven)
6	DF	BUL	Radoslav Terziev (to Gigant Saedinenie)
9	FW	BUL	Nikola Gelin (to Nesebar)
10	FW	BUL	Georgi Atanasov (to Fratria)
11	MF	BUL	Kristiyan Slishkov (to Strumska Slava)
14	MF	BUL	Hristo Ivanov (to Lokomotiv Mezdra)
16	DF	BUL	Kristiyan Hristov (to Lokomotiv Gorna Oryahovitsa)
17	MF	BUL	Stoyan Slavkov (to Spartak Plovdiv)
19	DF	BUL	Miroslav Kolev (released)
21	DF	BUL	Aleksandar Bastunov (to Vihren)
33	GK	BUL	Petar Debarliev (to Vihren)

=== Vihren ===
In:

No.	Pos.	Nation	Player
6	DF	BUL	Aleksandar Bastunov (from Sportist Svoge)
7	MF	PLE	Monir Al Badarin (from Spartak Pleven)
8	MF	BUL	Mario Ivov (from Pirin Blagoevgrad)
16	FW	FRA	Landry Malonda (from (French Football Federation) RC Argenteuil)
18	MF	BUL	Zhechko Zhelyazkov (from (The Football Association) Horsham YM)
19	DF	TUN	Maroine Mihoubi (from (Latvian Football Federation) Tukums 2000)
22	MF	TUN	Hassan Ayari (from (Canadian Soccer Association) Toronto FC II)
31	GK	BUL	Petar Debarliev (from Sportist Svoge)
71	FW	BRA	Robert Bebê (from (Brazilian Football Confederation) Porto de Caruaru)

Out:

No.	Pos.	Nation	Player
4	DF	NGA	Daniel Ayomide (on loan to Belasitsa Petrich)
6	MF	BUL	Veselin Lyubomirov (to Marek)
7	FW	BUL	Kitan Vasilev (to Marek)
8	MF	ESP	Antonio Cotán (to (Royal Spanish Football Federation) Atlètic Lleida)
11	MF	BUL	Daniel Pehlivanov (released)
12	GK	BUL	Borislav Smilyanski (to Pirin Blagoevgrad)
15	FW	BUL	Kristiyan Velichkov (to Etar)
16	FW	ALG	Wassim Aouachria (released)
18	DF	BUL	Adrian Vidinov (to Hebar)
19	MF	BUL	Aleksandar Yakimov (to Belasitsa Petrich)
22	DF	BUL	Georgi Korichkov (to Pirin Blagoevgrad)
71	MF	BUL	Anton Karachanakov (to Belasitsa Petrich)
—	FW	BRA	Yuri Pinheiro (to Sportist Svoge, previously on loan)

=== Yantra Gabrovo ===
In:

No.	Pos.	Nation	Player
11	FW	BUL	Milcho Angelov (from Dobrudzha)
12	GK	BUL	Hristo Lalev (from Sevlievo)
21	MF	BUL	Bozhidar Penchev (on loan from Botev Vratsa)

Out:

No.	Pos.	Nation	Player
12	GK	BUL	Kostadin Kotev (to Belasitsa Petrich)
20	MF	BUL	Velislav Vasilev (to Pirin Blagoevgrad)
99	FW	BUL	Ivan Vasilev (to Lokomotiv Gorna Oryahovitsa)
