= Dobrin Ragin =

Bulgarian footballer

Personal information
- Date of birth: 29 January 1970 (age 56)
- Place of birth: Sofia, Bulgaria
- Position: Forward

Senior career*
Years	Team	Apps	(Gls)
1991–1995	Loko Sofia	59	(8)
1995	Slavia Sofia	1	(0)
1996–1998	FC Kremikovtzi	70	(20)
1998–2000	Iskar Sofia	58	(43)
2000–2001	Etnikos (Cyprus)	15	(7)
2001–2003	Hebar Pazardzhik	70	(35)
2004–2005	Botev Ihtiman	35	(11)
- * Club domestic league appearances and goals

Dobrin Ragin (Bulgarian: Добрин Рагин) (born 29 January 1970) is a former Bulgarian footballer who played as a forward.

== Career ==
Ragin spent the majority of his playing career in Bulgaria, winning a Bulgarian Cup with Loko Sofia in 1995. He was also the top scorer in the B PFG in 2000, netting 24 times for Iskar Sofia.
