= Krasian Kolev =

Bulgarian footballer (born 2004)

Personal information
- Full name: Krasian Bozhidarov Kolev
- Date of birth: 18 January 2004 (age 22)
- Place of birth: Razgrad, Bulgaria
- Height: 1.80 m (5 ft 11 in)
- Position: Winger

Team information
- Current team: Chernomorets Burgas
- Number: 10

Youth career
- Cherno More
- 2018–2022: Septemvri Sofia

Senior career*
Years	Team	Apps	(Gls)
2021	Septemvri Sofia II	10	(2)
2021–2022	Septemvri Sofia	51	(4)
2023–2025	Botev Plovdiv II	21	(5)
2023–2025	Botev Plovdiv	26	(2)
2023–2024	→ Hebar (loan)	8	(1)
2025	Dobrudzha	6	(0)
2026	Septemvri Sofia	6	(0)
2026–	Chernomorets Burgas	11	(2)

International career^{‡}
2021–2023	Bulgaria U19	8	(0)
2022–2023	Bulgaria U21	5	(0)
- * Club domestic league appearances and goals as of 26 May 2026 ‡ National team caps and goals as of 11:45, 22 June 2023 (UTC)

Krasian Kolev (Bulgarian: Красиан Колев; born 18 January 2004) is a Bulgarian professional footballer who plays as a winger for Chernomorets Burgas.

== Career ==
Born in Razgrad, Krasian moved to Septemvri Sofia aged 14. Kolev scored his first league goal on top level on 21 August 2022 in a match against Beroe Stara Zagora. On 29 December 2022 he moved to Botev Plovdiv for an undisclosed transfer fee, which was a record fee for Septemvri leaving player. He made his debut for the club in a league match against Cherno More, scoring the first goal in a 2–1 win.

== International career ==
In September 2022 Kolev was called up for Bulgaria U19 for the 2023 UEFA European Under-19 Championship qualification matches against Azerbaijan U19, Luxembourg U19 and Turkey U19.

== Career statistics ==
=== Club ===
As of 6 September 2022

Club performance			League		Cup		Continental		Other		Total	
Club	League	Season	Apps	Goals	Apps	Goals	Apps	Goals	Apps	Goals	Apps	Goals
Bulgaria			League		Bulgarian Cup		Europe		Other (Note: Includes Bulgarian Supercup matches.)		Total	
Septemvri Sofia	Second League	2020–21	2	1	0	0	–		–		2	1
Septemvri Sofia	Second League	2021–22	32	2	3	0	–		–		35	2
Septemvri Sofia	First League	2022–23	11	1	0	0	–		–		8	4
Septemvri Sofia	Total		45	4	3	0	0	0	0	0	48	4
Career statistics			45	4	3	0	0	0	0	0	48	4
