= 1990–91 B Group =

Season of the Bulgarian B Football Group

Bulgarian B Group
- Season: 1990–91
- Champions: Hebar
- Promoted: Hebar; Dobrudzha
- Relegated: Bdin; Akademik Sofia; Pirin Razlog
- Matches: 342
- Goals: 873 (2.55 per match)
- Top goalscorer: (Bulgaria) Stoyan Dimov (25 goals)

The 1990–91 B Group was the 35th season of the Bulgarian B Football Group, the second tier of the Bulgarian football league system. A total of 19 teams contested the league.

Hebar Pazardzhik sealed an instant return to the A Group by sealing the B Group title. Dobrudzha Dobrich returned to the elite after twenty-two seasons away as runners-up.

== League table ==
Pos	Team	Pld	W	D	L	GF	GA	GD	Pts	Promotion or relegation
1	Hebar Pazardzhik (P)	36	22	10	4	76	23	+53	54	Promotion to 1991–92 A Group
2	Dobrudzha Dobrich (P)	36	19	8	9	53	28	+25	46	Promotion to 1991–92 A Group
3	Dorostol Silistra	36	19	8	9	50	26	+24	46	
4	Akademik Svishtov	36	20	6	10	54	36	+18	46	
5	Cherno More Varna	36	19	6	11	52	45	+7	44	
6	Montana	36	18	5	13	61	43	+18	41	
7	Svetkavitsa Targovishte	36	19	3	14	50	39	+11	41	
8	Spartak Varna	36	15	8	13	46	36	+10	38	
9	Rozova Dolina Kazanlak	36	13	7	16	52	47	+5	33	
10	Spartak Pleven	36	13	7	16	44	42	+2	33	
11	Velbazhd Kyustendil	36	13	7	16	42	49	−7	33	
12	Osam Lovech	36	12	8	16	35	53	−18	32	
13	Botev Vratsa	36	13	5	18	46	56	−10	31	
14	Chumerna Elena	36	13	5	18	41	54	−13	31	
15	Pavlikeni	36	12	7	17	36	56	−20	31	
16	Slanchev Bryag Nesebar	36	13	4	19	42	52	−10	30	
17	Bdin Vidin (R)	36	9	9	18	30	44	−14	27	Relegation to 1991–92 V Group
18	Akademik Sofia (R)	36	11	5	20	38	63	−25	27	Relegation to 1991–92 V Group
19	Pirin Razlog (R)	36	6	8	22	25	81	−56	20	Relegation to 1991–92 V Group

Source: 1991 Football retro-football.bg
Rules for classification: 1) points; 2) goal difference; 3) number of goals scored.
(P) Promoted; (R) Relegated

== Top scorers ==
Rank	Scorer	Club	Goals
1	(Bulgaria) Stoyan Dimov	Chumerna	25
2	(Bulgaria) Blagovest Petkov	Spartak Pleven	19
3	(Bulgaria) Kiril Vasilev	Hebar	18
4	(Bulgaria) Veselin Mihaylov	Montana	17
5	(Bulgaria) Dimitar Trendafilov	Spartak Varna	16
6	(Bulgaria) Mariyan Kirchev	Dobrudzha	15
6	(Bulgaria) Atanas Dimov	Slanchev Bryag	15
8	(Bulgaria) Strumen Avkov	Akademik Svishtov	14
8	(Bulgaria) Ventsislav Spasov	Dorostol	14
8	(Bulgaria) Nikolay Bachvarov	Svetkavitsa	14
8	(Bulgaria) Borislav Simeonov	Montana	14
