= Miroslav Georgiev =

Bulgarian footballer (born 2005)

Personal information
- Full name: Miroslav Petkov Georgiev
- Date of birth: 19 October 2005 (age 21)
- Place of birth: Barcelona, Spain
- Height: 1.92 m (6 ft 4 in)
- Position: Defender

Team information
- Current team: Hebar Pazardzhik
- Number: 6

Youth career
- Villa Olimpica
- Sant Gabriel

Senior career*
Years	Team	Apps	(Gls)
2022–2025	Botev Plovdiv II	50	(3)
2023–2025	Botev Plovdiv	3	(0)
2025	Feralpisalò	0	(0)
2026	Pirin Blagoevgrad	12	(1)
2026–	Hebar Pazardzhik	12	(1)
- * Club domestic league appearances and goals as of 5 November 2026

Miroslav Georgiev (Bulgarian: Мирослав Георгиев; born 19 October 2005) is a Spanish-born Bulgarian footballer who plays as a defender for Hebar Pazardzhik.

== Career ==
Born in Barcelona, Spain, Georgiev started playing in the local Villa Olimpica, before moving to Sant Gabriel Academy. In the summer of 2022 he returned in Bulgaria and joined Botev Plovdiv Academy. Miroslav established himself in the Botev II team and on 28 May 2023 he was included in the first team group for the league match against Slavia Sofia, but remained as unused substitute. He completed his debut on 6 July 2023 in a league match against Arda Kardzhali. On 19 June 2023 he was announced as new joining of Spartak Varna, who relegated to Second League, but 10 days later he returned in Botev after failed negotiations with Spartak. He signed his first professional contract with Botev on 31 July 2023, keeping him until the summer of 2026.

== Career statistics ==
=== Club ===
As of 19 June 2023

Club performance			League		Cup		Continental		Other		Total	
Club	League	Season	Apps	Goals	Apps	Goals	Apps	Goals	Apps	Goals	Apps	Goals
Botev Plovdiv II	Second League	2022–23	23	0	–		–		–		23	0
Botev Plovdiv II	Total		23	0	0	0	0	0	0	0	23	0
Botev Plovdiv	First League	2022–23	2	0	0	0	–		–		2	0
Botev Plovdiv	Total		2	0	0	0	0	0	0	0	2	0
Career statistics			16	0	0	0	0	0	0	0	16	0
