= Nabil Makni =

Tunisian footballer (born 2001)

Personal information
- Date of birth: 29 September 2001 (age 25)
- Place of birth: Cannes, France
- Height: 1.84 m (6 ft 0 in)
- Position: Centre-forward

Team information
- Current team: Arda Kardzhali
- Number: 70

Youth career
- –2019: Strasbourg
- 2019–2020: Chievo

Senior career*
Years	Team	Apps	(Gls)
2019	Strasbourg II	2	(0)
2020–2021	Chievo	0	(0)
2021–2022	ES Sahel		
2022	→ Al-Ittihad (loan)		
2022–2023	Vastogirardi	25	(3)
2023–2024	Sangiuliano City	21	(6)
2024–2025	Hebar	28	(9)
2025–2026	Volos	21	(0)
2026–	Arda Kardzhali	0	(0)

International career^{‡}
2020–2024	Tunisia	3	(0)
2021	Tunisia U20	5	(0)
- * Club domestic league appearances and goals as of 21:00, 1 March 2026 (UTC) ‡ National team caps and goals as of 21:00, 18 November 2024 (UTC)

Nabil Makni (Arabic: نبيل المقني; born 29 September 2001) is a professional footballer who plays as a centre-forward for Bulgarian First League club Arda Kardzhali. Born in France, he plays for the Tunisia national team.

== Club career ==
On 9 July 2023, Makni joined Italian Serie D club Sangiuliano City.

== International career ==
Makni made his debut for Tunisia national football team on 13 November 2020 in a 2021 Africa Cup of Nations qualification match against Tanzania, as an 93rd-minute substitute for Wahbi Khazri.

== Career statistics ==
=== International ===
As of matches played on 13 November 2020

Appearances and goals by national team and year
National team	Year	Apps	Goals
Tunisia	2020	2	0
Total		2	0
