= Petar Andreev =

Bulgarian footballer (born 2004)

Personal information
- Full name: Petar Dimitrov Andreev
- Date of birth: 2 July 2004 (age 22)
- Place of birth: Plovdiv, Bulgaria
- Height: 1.90 m (6 ft 3 in)
- Position: Midfielder

Team information
- Current team: Cherno More
- Number: 18

Youth career
- 2014–2022: Lokomotiv Plovdiv

Senior career*
Years	Team	Apps	(Gls)
2021–2024	Lokomotiv Plovdiv II	61	(14)
2023–2025	Lokomotiv Plovdiv	54	(6)
2026	Montana	4	(0)
2026–	Cherno More	8	(1)

International career^{‡}
2023–	Bulgaria U21	6	(0)
- * Club domestic league appearances and goals as of 13 October 2026 ‡ National team caps and goals as of 21:14, 1 October 2023 (UTC)

Petar Andreev (Bulgarian: Петър Андреев; born 2 July 2004) is a Bulgarian professional footballer who plays as a winger for Cherno More Varna.

== Career ==
Born in Plovdiv, he started his career in the local Lokomotiv Plovdiv at the age of 10. On 26 July 2023 he signed his first professional contract with Lokomotiv. On 28 September 2023 he scored the equalizer and later was announced as man of the match in a league game against Ludogorets Razgrad.

== International career ==
Andreev was called up for Bulgaria U21 for the 2025 UEFA European Under-21 Championship qualification against Estonia U21 and Israel U21.

== Career statistics ==
=== Club ===
As of 2 October 2023

Club performance			League		Cup		Continental		Other		Total	
Club	League	Season	Apps	Goals	Apps	Goals	Apps	Goals	Apps	Goals	Apps	Goals
Bulgaria			League		Bulgarian Cup		Europe		Other (Note: Includes Bulgarian Supercup matches.)		Total	
Lokomotiv Plovdiv II	Third League	2022–23	27	4	–		–		–		27	4
Lokomotiv Plovdiv II	Total		27	4	0	0	0	0	0	0	27	4
Lokomotiv Plovdiv	First League	2022–23	8	0	0	0	–		–		8	0
Lokomotiv Plovdiv	First League	2023–24	11	3	0	0	–		–		11	3
Lokomotiv Plovdiv	Total		19	3	0	0	0	0	0	0	19	3
Career statistics			46	7	0	0	0	0	0	0	46	7
