= Oktay Hamdiev =

Bulgarian footballer (born 2000)

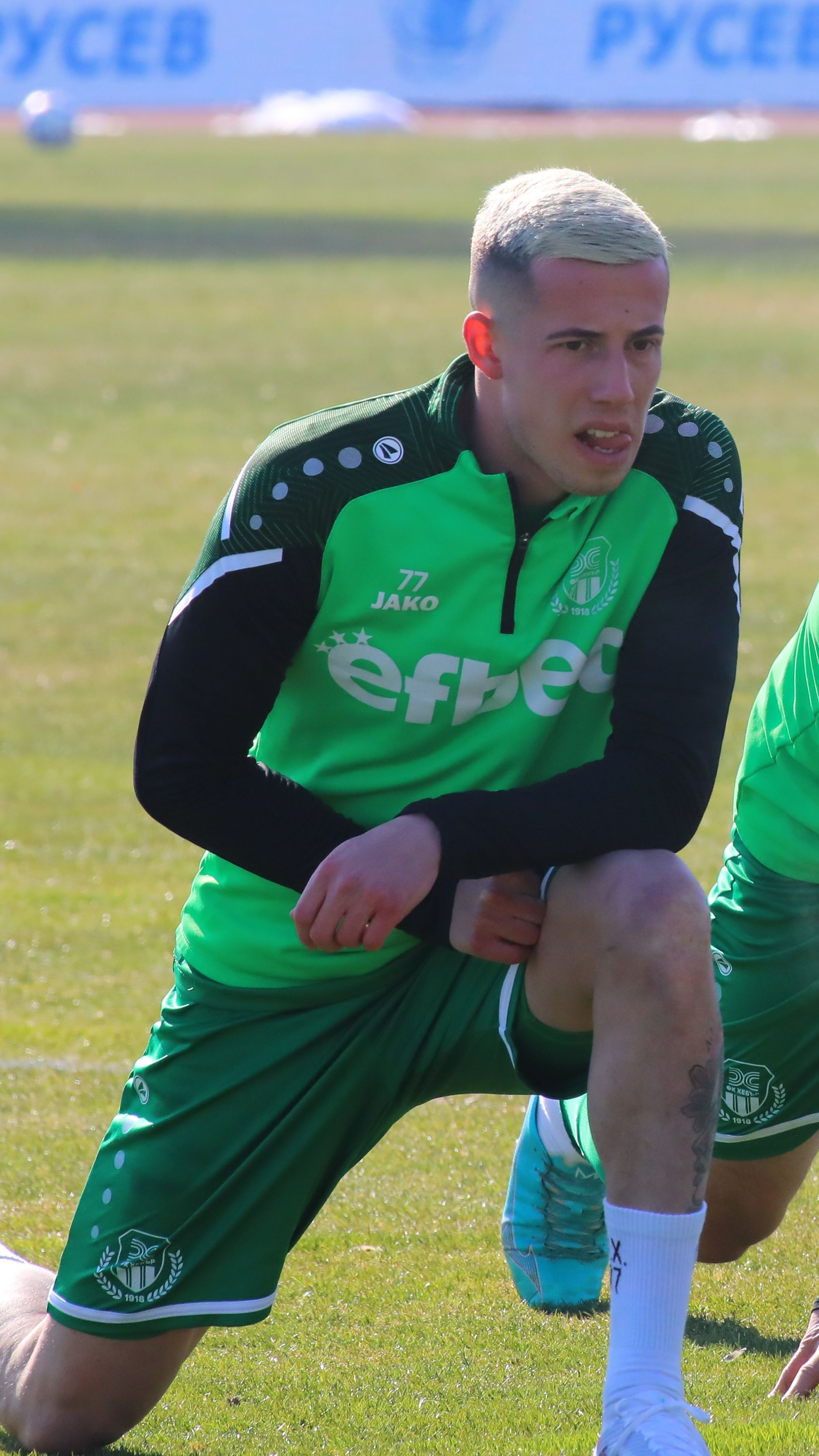
- Hamdiev in 2022

Personal information
- Full name: Oktay Ahmedov Hamdiev
- Date of birth: 24 July 2000 (age 26)
- Place of birth: Shumen, Bulgaria
- Height: 1.80 m (5 ft 11 in)
- Position: Winger

Team information
- Current team: Chernomorets Burgas
- Number: 77

Youth career
- –2016: Volov Shumen
- 2016–2019: Septemvri Sofia

Senior career*
Years	Team	Apps	(Gls)
2018–2019	Septemvri Sofia	0	(0)
2019–2025	Hebar	136	(13)
2025	Dobrudzha	14	(1)
2025–	Chernomorets Burgas	17	(0)
- * Club domestic league appearances and goals as of 11 June 2026

Oktay Ahmedov Hamdiev (Bulgarian: Октай Ахмедов Хамдиев; born 24 July 2000) is a Bulgarian footballer who plays as a winger for Bulgarian Second League club Chernomorets Burgas.

== Club career ==
Hamdiev spent his youth years at the academy of Septemvri Sofia from 2016 to 2018. On 25 September 2018, he made his debut for the team in a cup match against Kariana Erden.

In June 2019, he joined Hebar Pazardzhik.

== Career statistics ==
=== Club ===
As of 16 June 2023

Club performance			League		Cup		Continental		Other		Total	
Club	League	Season	Apps	Goals	Apps	Goals	Apps	Goals	Apps	Goals	Apps	Goals
Bulgaria			League		Bulgarian Cup		Europe		Other (Note: Includes Promotion/relegation play-off matches.)		Total	
Septemvri Sofia	First League	2018–19	0	0	1	0	–		–		1	0
Hebar Pazardzhik	Second League	2019–20	19	4	1	0	–		–		20	4
Hebar Pazardzhik	Second League	2020–21	26	6	0	0	–		–		26	6
Hebar Pazardzhik	Second League	2021–22	33	1	1	0	–		–		34	1
Hebar Pazardzhik	First League	2022–23	33	2	1	0	–		–		34	2
Hebar Pazardzhik	Total		111	13	3	0	0	0	0	0	114	13
Career statistics			111	13	4	0	0	0	0	0	115	13
