= Georgi Tartov =

Bulgarian footballer

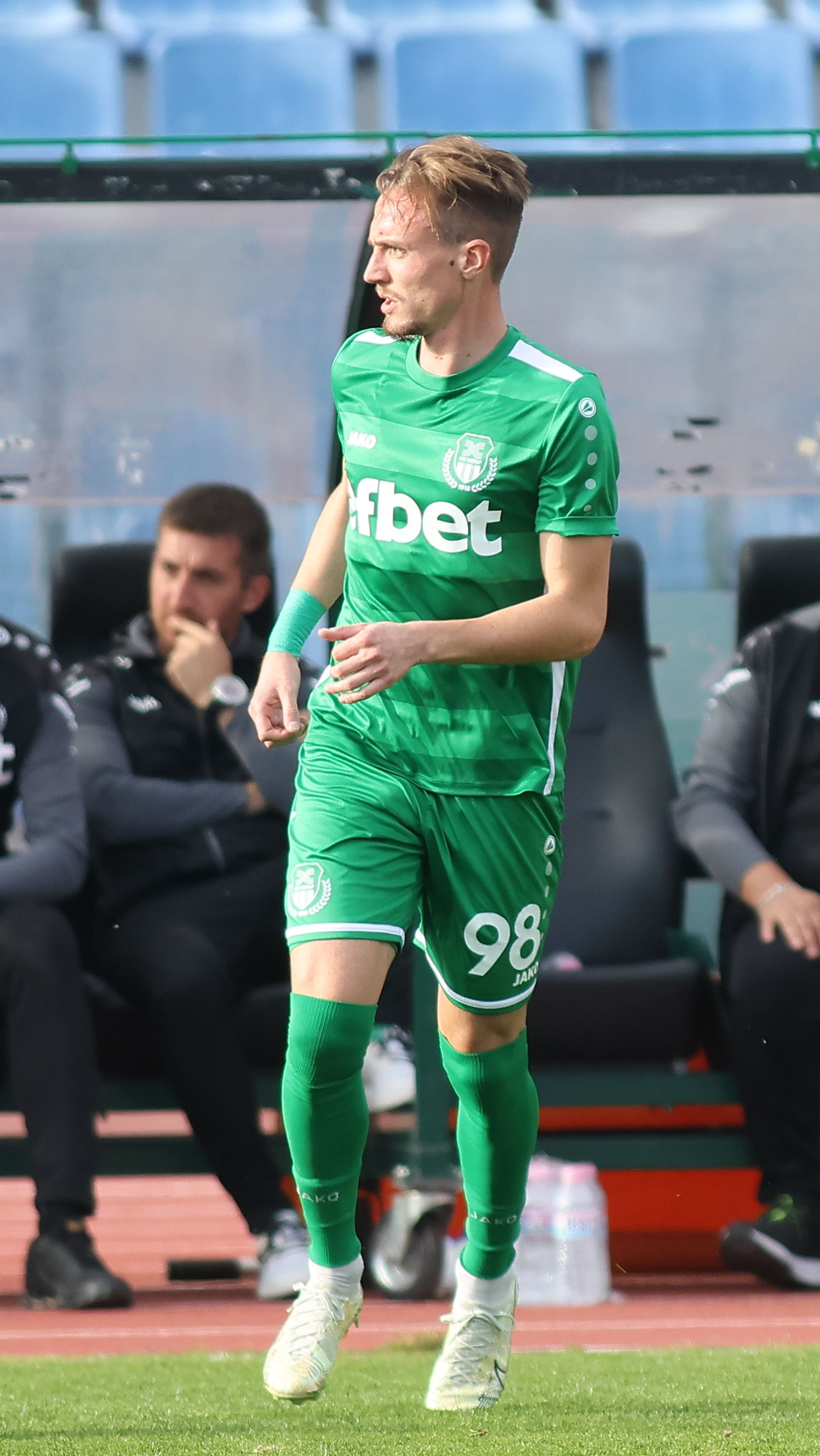

Personal information
- Full name: Georgi Nikolov Tartov
- Date of birth: 3 December 1998 (age 27)
- Place of birth: Garmen, Bulgaria
- Position: Midfielder

Team information
- Current team: Rilski Sportist
- Number: 98

Youth career
- –2016: Litex Lovech

Senior career*
Years	Team	Apps	(Gls)
2015–2016	Litex Lovech II	4	(0)
2016–2017	CSKA Sofia II	18	(1)
2017	CSKA Sofia	1	(0)
2017–2018	Litex Lovech	31	(2)
2019	Botev Galabovo	13	(0)
2019–2020	Kariana	32	(3)
2021–2023	Hebar	69	(8)
2023–2024	Slavia Sofia	3	(0)
2024	Hebar	14	(0)
2025	Krumovgrad	11	(0)
2025–2026	Pirin Blagoevgrad	10	(1)
2026	Montana	0	(0)
2026–	Rilski Sportist	11	(2)
- * Club domestic league appearances and goals as of 5 November 2026

Georgi Tartov (Bulgarian: Георги Търтов; born 3 December 1998) is a Bulgarian footballer who plays as a midfielder for Rilski Sportist.

== Career ==
=== CSKA Sofia ===
On 31 May 2017 he made his debut for CSKA Sofia in match against Dunav Ruse.

=== Litex Lovech ===
On 14 June 2017 he returned in his youth club Litex Lovech.

=== Krumovgrad ===
In January 2025, Tartov signed a contract with Krumovgrad.

== Career statistics ==
=== Club ===
As of 31 May 2017

Club performance			League		Cup		Continental		Other		Total	
Club	League	Season	Apps	Goals	Apps	Goals	Apps	Goals	Apps	Goals	Apps	Goals
Bulgaria			League		Bulgarian Cup		Europe		Other (Note: Includes Bulgarian Supercup matches.)		Total	
Litex Lovech II	B Group	2015–16	4	0	–		–		–		4	0
CSKA Sofia II	Second League	2016–17	18	0	–		–		–		18	0
CSKA Sofia	First League	2016–17	1	0	0	0	—		—		1	0
CSKA Sofia	Total		1	0	0	0	0	0	0	0	1	0
Career statistics			23	0	0	0	0	0	0	0	23	0
