= Martin Mihaylov =

Bulgarian footballer (born 2000)

Personal information
- Full name: Martin Mitkov Mihaylov
- Date of birth: 3 January 2000 (age 26)
- Place of birth: Sofia, Bulgaria
- Height: 1.85 m (6 ft 1 in)
- Positions: Right-back; centre-back

Team information
- Current team: Hebar
- Number: 55

Youth career
- –2018: Slavia Sofia

Senior career*
Years	Team	Apps	(Gls)
2017–2018	Slavia Sofia	0	(0)
2018	Pirin Razlog	11	(0)
2019–2020	Kyustendil	16	(1)
2020–2021	Sportist Svoge	24	(0)
2021–2024	Hebar	86	(0)
2025	Montana	25	(0)
2026–	Hebar	9	(2)

International career
2016–2017	Bulgaria U17	3	(0)
- * Club domestic league appearances and goals as of 11 June 2026

Martin Mitkov Mihaylov (born 24 July 2000) is a Bulgarian professional footballer who plays as a right-back or centre-back for Hebar Pazardzhik.

== Club career ==
Mihaylov spent his youth at the academy of Slavia Sofia to 2018. He made his debut in men's football for the Pirin Razlog team, then played for Kyustendil and Sportist Svoge. On June 11, 2021, he signed with Hebar Pazardzhik.
