= Kiril Vasilev =

Bulgarian footballer

Personal information
- Full name: Kiril Dimitrov Vasilev
- Date of birth: 7 March 1967 (age 59)
- Place of birth: Pazardzhik, Bulgaria
- Height: 1.84 m (6 ft 0 in)
- Position: Forward

Youth career
- Hebar Pazardzhik

Senior career*
Years	Team	Apps	(Gls)
1985–1992	Hebar	172	(58)
1993	Lokomotiv GO	14	(1)
1993	Hebar	18	(4)
1994	Lokomotiv Sofia	11	(2)
1994–1995	Levski Kyustendil	27	(11)
1995–1998	Haskovo	81	(57)
1998	Lokomotiv Plovdiv	4	(0)
1998–2001	Haskovo	71	(24)

International career
1991–1992	Bulgaria	1	(0)
- * Club domestic league appearances and goals

Kiril Dimitrov Vasilev (born 7 March 1967 in Pazardzhik) is a Bulgarian former football forward. He ended his career at the end of 2000–01 season.

He made his debut for Hebar Pazardzhik. In 1991, he was on the Bulgaria national football team. He also played for Haskovo, Lokomotiv Sofia, Levski Kyustendil and Lokomotiv Plovdiv.
