= Todor Chavorski =

Bulgarian footballer

Personal information
- Full name: Todor Kostadinov Chavorski
- Date of birth: 30 March 1993 (age 33)
- Place of birth: Sofia, Bulgaria
- Height: 1.82 m (6 ft 0 in)
- Position: Forward

Team information
- Current team: Minyor Pernik
- Number: 39

Youth career
- Levski Sofia

Senior career*
Years	Team	Apps	(Gls)
2010–2013	Levski Sofia	1	(0)
2013	→ Pirin Razlog (loan)	10	(1)
2013	→ Dobrudzha (loan)	6	(0)
2014–2015	Lokomotiv Mezdra	54	(12)
2016–2017	Botev Vratsa	54	(22)
2018	Oborishte	12	(2)
2018	Minyor Pernik	16	(7)
2019	Lokomotiv Sofia	13	(2)
2019–2022	Hebar	88	(26)
2023	Yantra Gabrovo	13	(1)
2023–2026	Chernomorets Burgas	33	(3)
2026–	Minyor Pernik	0	(0)
- * Club domestic league appearances and goals as of 30 July 2026

Todor Chavorski (Bulgarian: Тодор Чаворски; born 30 March 1993) is a Bulgarian footballer who plays as a forward for Minyor Pernik.

== Career ==
=== Youth career ===
Chavorski has been training in Levski Sofia's youth academy since 2002. On 28 February 2010, he scored the winning goal in the Eternal Derby, playing for the Youth team. During 2010/2011 pre-season training he was called up to the first team.

=== Levski Sofia ===
Todor made his unofficial debut for Levski Sofia on 4 September 2010 in a friendly match against Montana. Chavorski entered the match as a substitute and scored the third goal for the final 3:1 win for Levski. On the same day, the head coach of Levski Sofia Yasen Petrov said, he would start training with the first team. Chavorski made his competitive debut during the 2010–11 season on 12 September 2010 in a 4–0 home win against Minyor Pernik, coming on as a substitute for Darko Tasevski.

=== Minyor Pernik ===
On 12 June 2018, Chavorski joined Third League club Minyor Pernik.

== Career stats ==
As of 9 January 2011.

Club	Season	League		Cup		Europe		Total	
Club	Season	Apps	Goals	Apps	Goals	Apps	Goals	Apps	Goals
Levski Sofia	2010–11	1	0	0	0	0	0	1	0
Levski Sofia	2011–12	0	0	0	0	0	0	0	0
Levski Sofia	2012–13	0	0	2	0	0	0	2	0
Career totals		1	0	2	0	0	0	3	0
