= Stadion Georgi Benkovski =

Multi-use stadium in Pazardzhik, Bulgaria

- Стадион Георги Бенковски
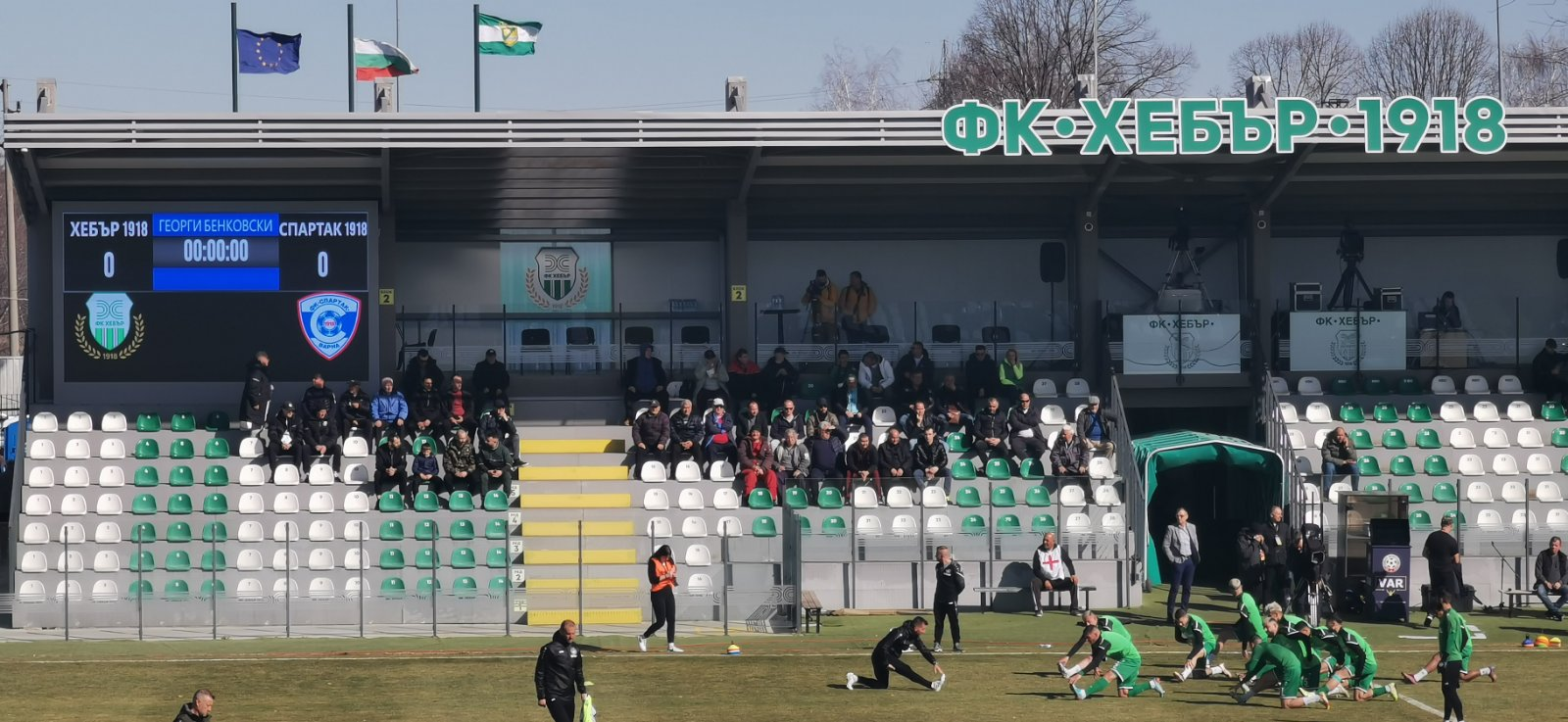
- The stadium in 2023

- Location within Bulgaria
- Former names: Septemvri (1989-1991)
- Address: Bulgaria
- Location: Pazardzhik, Bulgaria
- Coordinates: 42°12′39″N 24°19′21″E
- Capacity: 13,000
- Type: Multi-use stadium
- Surface: Grass

Construction
- Opened: 1989
- Renovated: 2021-2023

Stadion Georgi Benkovski (Bulgarian: Стадион "Георги Бенковски") is a multi-use stadium in Pazardzhik, Bulgaria. It is currently used mostly for football matches and is the home ground of FC Hebar Pazardzhik. The stadium holds around 13 thousand people.

== History ==
The fourth pitch was completed in 1989. It was then called the Septemvri Stadium and had a seating capacity of 12,000. It was inaugurated that year on 26 March with the match FC Hebar - FC Yantra 1:0, attended by 15 000 spectators. On 30 July 1991 the stadium was renamed "Georgi Benkovski", whose name it still bears today. This is the current stadium of FC Hebar. The three seasons in ''A'' Football Group were played in this stadium. It has modern changing rooms, a press conference hall, two covered benches for journalists and guests, a referee's room and meets all the requirements for holding football matches.
