= Nikolay Nikolaev (footballer, born 1997) =

Bulgarian footballer

Personal information
- Full name: Nikolay Stefanov Nikolaev
- Date of birth: 19 March 1997 (age 29)
- Place of birth: Sofia, Bulgaria
- Height: 1.72 m (5 ft 7 1/2 in)
- Positions: Right-back; winger

Youth career
- –2016: Levski Sofia

Senior career*
Years	Team	Apps	(Gls)
2016	Hebar	14	(0)
2017	Spartak Pleven	1	(0)
2017–2018	Hebar	22	(1)
2018–2019	Dobrudzha	25	(0)
2019–2021	Lokomotiv Plovdiv	46	(1)
2022	Tsarsko Selo	11	(0)
2022	Beroe	7	(0)
2023–2025	Hebar	55	(1)
2025	Lokomotiv Plovdiv	6	(0)
Total		187	(3)
- * Club domestic league appearances and goals as of 16 October 2026

Nikolay Nikolaev (Bulgarian: Николай Николаев; born 19 March 1997) is a Bulgarian former professional footballer who plays as a right-back for Lokomotiv Plovdiv.

== Honours ==
=== Club ===
Lokomotiv Plovdiv

- Bulgarian Cup: 2019–20
- Bulgarian Supercup: 2020
