= Vladimir Manchev =

Bulgarian footballer

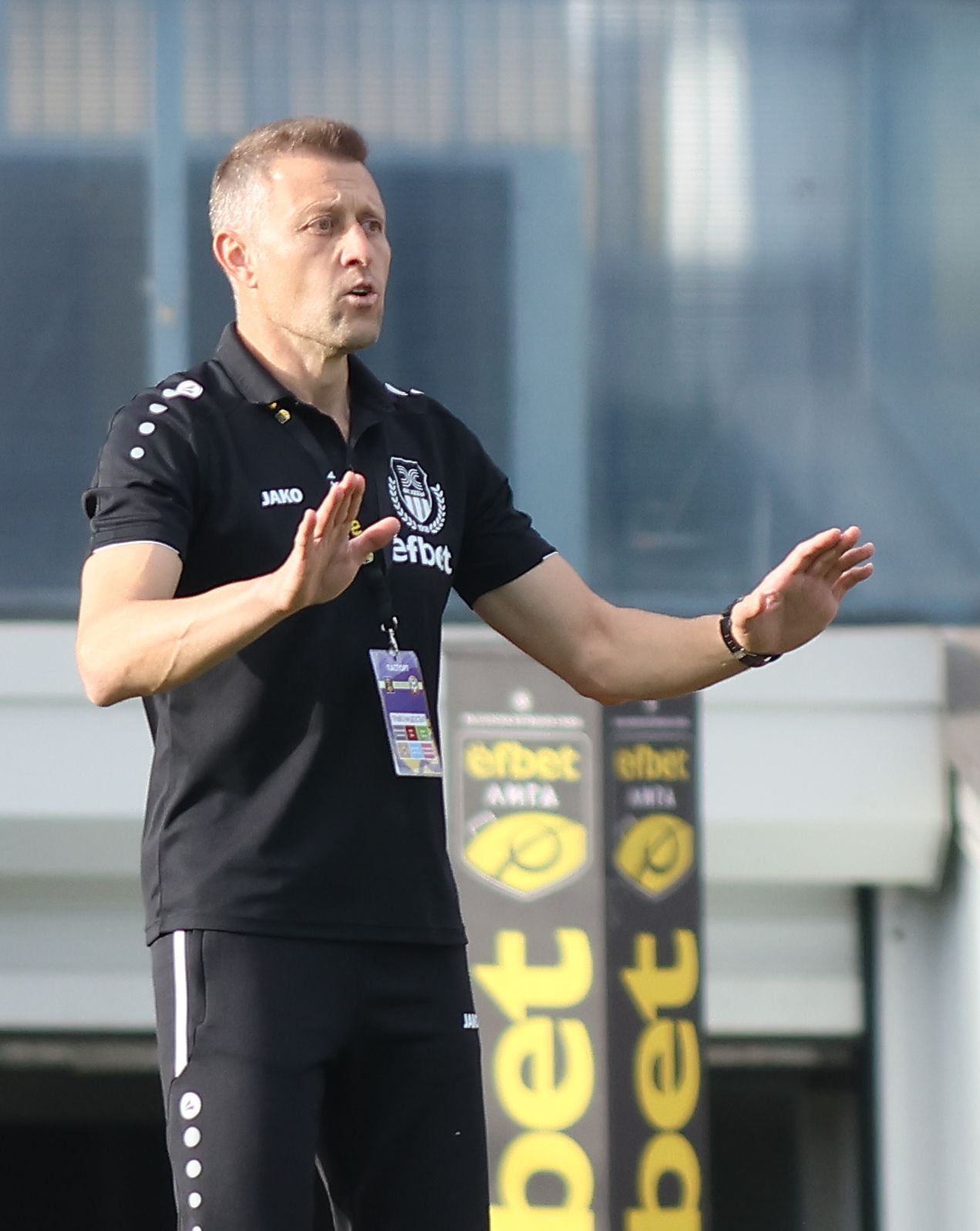
- Manchev in 2022

Personal information
- Date of birth: 6 October 1977 (age 49)
- Place of birth: Pazardzhik, Bulgaria
- Height: 1.83 m (6 ft 0 in)
- Position: Forward

Team information
- Current team: Beroe Stara Zagora (head coach)

Youth career
- Hebar Pazardzhik

Senior career*
Years	Team	Apps	(Gls)
1996–1997	Spartak Pleven	4	(1)
1997–1998	Yantra Gabrovo	16	(3)
1998	Hebar Pazardzhik	21	(15)
1998–2002	CSKA Sofia	86	(41)
2002–2004	Lille	66	(20)
2004–2007	Levante	60	(13)
2007	Valladolid	17	(6)
2007–2008	Celta	10	(0)
2008	Valladolid	5	(0)
2008–2010	CSKA Sofia	9	(5)
2010–2012	Lokomotiv Sofia	13	(3)
Total		307	(107)

International career
2001–2007	Bulgaria	23	(1)

Managerial career
- 2015–2016: CSKA Sofia (assistant)
- 2016–2017: Neftochimic Burgas (assistant)
- 2018–2020: CSKA Sofia (scout)
- 2020–2022: Minyor Pernik (assistant)
- 2022: Hebar Pazardzhik (assistant)
- 2022–2023: Hebar Pazardzhik
- 2024–2025: CSKA Sofia II
- 2025–2026: Minyor Pernik
- 2026–: Beroe Stara Zagora
- * Club domestic league appearances and goals

Vladimir Manchev (Bulgarian: Владимир Манчев; born 6 October 1977) is a Bulgarian professional football manager and former player who played as a forward. He is the head coach of Bulgarian Second League club Beroe Stara Zagora.

== Club career ==
Manchev has played for Bulgarian teams of Spartak Pleven, Yantra and Hebar, French side Lille OSC and Spanish teams Levante UD, Valladolid and Celta Vigo. He was the top goalscorer of the Bulgarian "A" Professional Football Group in 2001–2002 season with 21 goals netted for CSKA Sofia. He won the Bulgarian Cup in 1999 with CSKA. In October 2008 Manchev again became part of the most successful Bulgarian club's squad. In the last match for the autumn period of the 2008–09 season against Lokomotiv Mezdra he received an injury in his knee ligaments, which prevented him from playing football for about nine months. He was expected to be back in play for the next season. On 30 August 2009, Manchev scored the third goal in the 4–0 home win against Lokomotiv Mezdra in his first game back from injury after coming on as a substitute for Rui Miguel. Manchev is a CSKA Sofia's fans' favourite. Although he was injured most of the 2008–09 season, in which he played only four matches, he scored four goals and made a few assists, so on 16 June 2009 it was said that in the next few days he would sign a new contract, which would make him a CSKA player for the next two years. He signed a new one-year contract on 24 July 2009. In the summer 2010 Manchev was transferred to Akademik Sofia, but did not make any appearances in official matches for the team. In February 2012, Manchev signed a contract with Loko Sofia. He scored two goals in his return debut to help his team to a 2–0 win over Loko Plovdiv on 5 March 2012.

== International career ==
Manchev was part of the Bulgarian 2004 European Football Championship team, which exited in the first round, finishing bottom of Group C, having finished top of Qualifying Group 8 in the pre-tournament phase.

== Managerial career ==
In March 2015, Manchev was appointed as assistant manager of CSKA Sofia. On 17 September 2016, Manchev became assistant manager of Neftochimic Burgas. In June 2022, he joined the coaching staff of hometown club Hebar. He served as the head coach between September 2022 and March 2023.

== Career statistics ==
Scores and results list Bulgaria's goal tally first.

#	Date	Venue	Opponent	Score	Result	Competition
1	18 November 2003	Seoul World Cup Stadium, Seoul, South Korea	South Korea	1–0	1–0	Exhibition game

== Managerial statistics ==
As of 5 January 2026

Team	From	To	Record							
Team	From	To	G	W	D	L	Win %	GF	GA	GD
Hebar Pazardzhik	23 September 2022	18 March 2023	14	2	3	9	14.29	11	26	-15
CSKA Sofia II	8 June 2024	15 September 2025	46	14	15	17	30.43	56	53	3
Minyor Pernik	4 November 2025		5	2	2	1	40.00	4	4	0
Total			60	16	18	26	26.67	67	79	-12

== Honours ==
=== As a player ===
CSKA Sofia

- Bulgarian Cup: 1998–99

Lille

- UEFA Intertoto Cup: 2004

Real Valladolid

- Segunda División: 2006–07

Individual

- Bulgarian First League top scorer: 2001–02
