= 2022–23 First Professional Football League (Bulgaria) =

99th season of top-tier football league in Bulgaria

First Professional Football League
- Season: 2022–23
- Dates: 8 July 2022 – 11 June 2023
- Champions: Ludogorets Razgrad (12th title)
- Relegated: Spartak Varna; Septemvri Sofia
- Champions League: Ludogorets Razgrad
- Europa Conference League: CSKA Sofia; CSKA 1948 Sofia; Levski Sofia
- Matches: 284
- Goals: 670 (2.36 per match)
- Top goalscorer: Ivaylo Chochev (21 goals)
- Best goalkeeper: Plamen Andreev (22 clean sheets)
- Biggest home win: Ludogorets 8–1 Botev Vratsa (8 April 2023)
- Biggest away win: Lokomotiv Sofia 0–6 CSKA 1948 (3 March 2023)
- Highest scoring: Ludogorets 8–1 Botev Vratsa (8 April 2023)
- Longest winning run: 9 games Ludogorets
- Longest unbeaten run: 16 games CSKA Sofia
- Longest winless run: 11 games Levski Sofia
- Longest losing run: 7 games Spartak Varna; Septemvri Sofia
- All statistics correct as of 22:31, 11 June 2023 (UTC).

The 2022–23 First Professional Football League, also known as efbet League for sponsorship reasons, was the 99th season of the top division of the Bulgarian football league system, the 75th since a league format was adopted for the national competition of A Group as a top tier of the pyramid, and also the 7th season of the First Professional Football League, which decides the Bulgarian champion. The season began on 8 July 2022. Due to the 2022 FIFA World Cup, the last round before the league's winter break was held on 11–12 November. The league resumed on 11 February 2023.

Ludogorets Razgrad were the 11-time defending champions. On 7 June 2023, they won their 12th straight title in a dramatic final matchday, winning 1–0 away at Cherno More and finishing one point above second-placed CSKA Sofia.

== Teams ==
From this season, the league was expanded from 14 to 16 teams, with 12 teams returning from last season, three teams promoted from the 2021–22 Second League, as well as the winner of the promotion/relegation playoff.

The first team to earn promotion from the Second League was Spartak Varna, who mathematically secured a top three finish after winning their game against Sozopol on May 5, coupled with Etar losing to CSKA 1948 II. Spartak return to the top level after a 13-year absence.

The second team to earn promotion from the Second League was Septemvri Sofia, who mathematically secured a top three finish after drawing with Sportist Svoge on May 9. Septemvri Sofia return to the top level after a 3-year absence.

The third team to earn promotion from the Second League was Hebar, who secured a top three finish in the very last round of the Second League, on May 21. Hebar return to the top level of Bulgarian football after a 21-year absence.

Additionally, Botev Vratsa managed to defeat Etar with a score of 3–2 in the promotion/relegation playoff, thus maintaining its place in the First League.

=== Stadia and locations ===
Arda	Beroe	Botev Plovdiv	Botev Vratsa
Arena Arda	Beroe	Hristo Botev	Hristo Botev
Capacity: 11,114	Capacity: 12,128	Capacity: 18,777	Capacity: 6,417
Cherno More	CSKA 1948	CSKA Sofia	Hebar
Ticha	Bistritsa	Balgarska Armia	Georgi Benkovski
Capacity: 6,250	Capacity: 2,500	Capacity: 22,995	Capacity: 13,128
Levski Sofia	Location of teams in 2022–23 First League Sofia 2022–23 First League football clubs		Lokomotiv Plovdiv
Vivacom Arena - Georgi Asparuhov	Location of teams in 2022–23 First League Sofia 2022–23 First League football clubs		Lokomotiv
Capacity: 25,000	Location of teams in 2022–23 First League Sofia 2022–23 First League football clubs		Capacity: 8,610
Lokomotiv Sofia	Location of teams in 2022–23 First League Sofia 2022–23 First League football clubs		Ludogorets
Lokomotiv	Location of teams in 2022–23 First League Sofia 2022–23 First League football clubs		Huvepharma Arena
Capacity: 22,000	Location of teams in 2022–23 First League Sofia 2022–23 First League football clubs		Capacity: 10,422
Pirin Blagoevgrad	Septemvri Sofia	Slavia Sofia	Spartak Varna
Hristo Botev	Vasil Levski National Stadium	Aleksandar Shalamanov	Spartak
Capacity: 7,500	Capacity: 43,230	Capacity: 25,556	Capacity: 7,500

=== Personnel and kits ===
Note: Flags indicate national team as has been defined under FIFA eligibility rules. Players and managers may hold more than one non-FIFA nationality.

Team	Manager	Captain	Kit manufacturer	Shirt sponsor	Additional
Arda	(Bulgaria) Aleksandar Tunchev	(Bulgaria) Ivan Kokonov	Uhlsport	efbet	IA Nataliya Ltd.
Beroe	(Bulgaria) Nikolay Kirov	(Bulgaria) Ivan Karadzhov	Jako	efbet	Chahov Ltd.
Botev Plovdiv	(Portugal) Bruno Baltazar	(Bulgaria) Viktor Genev	Macron	WinBet	—
Botev Vratsa	(Brazil) Daniel Morales	(Bulgaria) Krasimir Kostov	Zeus	WinBet	Vratsa Municipality, SportRespect
Cherno More	(Bulgaria) Ilian Iliev	(Bulgaria) Daniel Dimov	Uhlsport	Armeets	—
CSKA 1948	(Bulgaria) Todor Yanchev	(Bulgaria) Daniel Naumov	Adidas	efbet	Bachkovo
CSKA Sofia	(Serbia) Saša Ilić	(Netherlands) Jurgen Mattheij	Macron	WinBet	—
Hebar	(Bulgaria) Lyuboslav Penev	(Bulgaria) Petar Debarliev	Jako	efbet	Pazardzhik Municipality
Levski Sofia	(Bulgaria) Elin Topuzakov	(Bulgaria) Nikolay Mihaylov	Joma	PalmsBet	—
Lokomotiv Plovdiv	(Bulgaria) Aleksandar Tomash	(Bulgaria) Dimitar Iliev	Nike	WinBet	General Broker, Money+
Lokomotiv Sofia	(Bulgaria) Stanislav Genchev	(Bulgaria) Krasimir Miloshev	Joma	Betano	Casa Boyana, Malizia, Intesa, VIA 2000, Club 33
Ludogorets	(Bulgaria) Ivaylo Petev	(Bulgaria) Anton Nedyalkov	Nike	efbet	Vivacom, HUVESEPT
Pirin Blagoevgrad	(Bulgaria) Hristo Yanev	(Bulgaria) Krasimir Stanoev	Adidas	8888.bg	—
Septemvri Sofia	(Bulgaria) Svetoslav Petrov	(Bulgaria) Asen Georgiev	Uhlsport	8888.bg	—
Slavia Sofia	(Bulgaria) Zlatomir Zagorčić	(Bulgaria) Georgi Petkov	Uhlsport	bet365	Asset Insurance
Spartak Varna	(Bulgaria) Dimitar Dimitrov	(Bulgaria) Rumen Rumenov	Jako	efbet	Intercom Group

Note: Individual clubs may wear jerseys with advertising. However, only one sponsorship is permitted per jersey for official tournaments organised by UEFA in addition to that of the kit manufacturer (exceptions are made for non-profit organisations). Clubs in the domestic league can have more than one sponsorship per jersey which can feature on the front of the shirt, incorporated with the main sponsor or in place of it; or on the back, either below the squad number or on the collar area. Shorts also have space available for advertisement.

=== Managerial changes ===
Team	Outgoing manager	Manner of departure	Date of vacancy	Position in table	Incoming manager	Date of appointment
Arda	(Bulgaria) Stamen Belchev	End of contract	16 May 2022	Pre-season	(Bulgaria) Aleksandar Tunchev	19 May 2022
Lokomotiv Sofia	(Bulgaria) Ivan Kolev	End of contract	23 May 2022	Pre-season	(Bulgaria) Stanislav Genchev	25 May 2022
CSKA 1948	(Bulgaria) Nikolay Kirov	Mutual consent	23 May 2022	Pre-season	(Bulgaria) Lyuboslav Penev	28 May 2022
CSKA Sofia	(England) Alan Pardew	Mutual consent	1 June 2022	Pre-season	(Serbia) Saša Ilić	2 June 2022
Botev Vratsa	(Italy) Gennaro Iezzo	Sacked	2 June 2022	Pre-season	(Bulgaria) Rosen Kirilov	2 June 2022
Hebar	(Bulgaria) Nikolay Mitov	End of contract	8 June 2022	Pre-season	(Italy) Fulvio Pea	13 June 2022
Pirin Blagoevgrad	(Bulgaria) Radoslav Mitrevski	Resigned	20 June 2022	Pre-season	(Bulgaria) Petar Mihtarski (interim)	21 June 2022
Pirin Blagoevgrad	(Bulgaria) Petar Mihtarski	End of interim period	3 July 2022	Pre-season	(Bulgaria) Krasimir Petrov	4 July 2022
Botev Plovdiv	(Bosnia and Herzegovina) Azrudin Valentić	Promoted to advisor	29 July 2022	16th	(Croatia) Željko Kopić	3 August 2022
Spartak Varna	(Bulgaria) Vasil Petrov	Resigned	11 August 2022	15th	(Bulgaria) Georgi Ivanov (interim)	11 August 2022
Spartak Varna	(Bulgaria) Georgi Ivanov	End of interim period	22 August 2022	16th	(Bulgaria) Todor Kiselichkov	23 August 2022
Botev Vratsa	(Bulgaria) Rosen Kirilov	Resigned	6 September 2022	12th	(Bulgaria) Vladislav Vutov (interim)	6 September 2022
Beroe	(Bulgaria) Petar Hubchev	Mutual consent	12 September 2022	10th	(Bulgaria) Nikolay Kirov	14 September 2022
Botev Vratsa	(Bulgaria) Vladislav Vutov	End of interim period	14 September 2022	14th	(Brazil) Daniel Morales	14 September 2022
Hebar	(Italy) Fulvio Pea	Promoted to sports director	23 September 2022	15th	(Bulgaria) Vladimir Manchev	23 September 2022
Septemvri Sofia	(Serbia) Slavko Matić	Mutual consent	9 October 2022	15th	(Bulgaria) Svetoslav Petrov	9 October 2022
Pirin Blagoevgrad	(Bulgaria) Krasimir Petrov	Mutual consent	18 October 2022	15th	(Bulgaria) Hristo Yanev	25 October 2022
Spartak Varna	(Bulgaria) Todor Kiselichkov	Mutual consent	28 November 2022	16th	(Bulgaria) Dimitar Dimitrov	28 November 2022
CSKA 1948	(Bulgaria) Lyuboslav Penev	Resigned	10 December 2022	3rd	(Bulgaria) Todor Yanchev	13 December 2022
Botev Plovdiv	(Croatia) Željko Kopić	Sacked	7 December 2022	10th	(Portugal) Bruno Baltazar	3 January 2023
Ludogorets	(Slovenia) Ante Šimundža	Sacked	7 March 2023	2nd	(Bulgaria) Ivaylo Petev	7 March 2023
Hebar	(Bulgaria) Vladimir Manchev	Sacked	20 March 2023	15th	(Bulgaria) Lyuboslav Penev	21 March 2023
Levski Sofia	(Bulgaria) Stanimir Stoilov	Resigned	8 April 2023	4th	(Bulgaria) Elin Topuzakov	12 April 2023
Slavia Sofia	(Bulgaria) Zlatomir Zagorčić	Resigned	4 May 2023	7th	(Bulgaria) Angel Slavkov	4 May 2023
Septemvri Sofia	(Bulgaria) Svetoslav Petrov	Resigned	5 May 2023	13th	(Bulgaria) Krasimir Balakov	5 May 2023
CSKA 1948	(Bulgaria) Todor Yanchev	Resigned	25 May 2023	3rd	(Bulgaria) Atanas Ribarski	25 May 2023
Botev Plovdiv	(Portugal) Bruno Baltazar	Sacked	25 May 2023	10th	(Bulgaria) Stefan Stoyanov (interim)	25 May 2023
Spartak Varna	(Bulgaria) Dimitar Dimitrov	Resigned	6 June 2023	16th	(Bulgaria) Valentin Iliev	6 June 2023
Beroe	(Bulgaria) Nikolay Kirov	Sacked	6 June 2023	14th	(Bulgaria) Veselin Penev (interim)	6 June 2023
Lokomotiv Sofia	(Bulgaria) Stanislav Genchev	Resigned	6 June 2023	9th	(Bulgaria) Stoycho Stoev	8 June 2023
Botev Plovdiv	(Bulgaria) Stefan Stoyanov	End of interim period	8 June 2023	10th	(Bulgaria) Stanislav Genchev	8 June 2023

== Regular season ==
=== League table ===
Pos	Team	Pld	W	D	L	GF	GA	GD	Pts	Qualification
1	Ludogorets Razgrad	30	23	5	2	72	21	+51	74	Qualification for the Championship group
2	CSKA Sofia	30	23	4	3	57	14	+43	73	Qualification for the Championship group
3	CSKA 1948	30	17	8	5	49	22	+27	59	Qualification for the Championship group
4	Levski Sofia	30	15	9	6	38	14	+24	54	Qualification for the Championship group
5	Cherno More	30	15	8	7	36	27	+9	53	Qualification for the Championship group
6	Lokomotiv Plovdiv	30	14	8	8	33	28	+5	50	Qualification for the Championship group
7	Slavia Sofia	30	15	4	11	31	27	+4	49	Qualification for the Europa Conference League group
8	Arda	30	11	9	10	33	32	+1	42	Qualification for the Europa Conference League group
9	Lokomotiv Sofia	30	10	8	12	32	38	−6	38	Qualification for the Europa Conference League group
10	Botev Plovdiv	30	9	5	16	38	40	−2	32	Qualification for the Europa Conference League group
11	Botev Vratsa	30	7	7	16	23	55	−32	28	Qualification for the Relegation group
12	Beroe	30	7	6	17	26	47	−21	27	Qualification for the Relegation group
13	Pirin Blagoevgrad	30	5	9	16	21	39	−18	24	Qualification for the Relegation group
14	Hebar	30	6	5	19	19	51	−32	23	Qualification for the Relegation group
15	Septemvri Sofia	30	5	7	18	25	45	−20	22	Qualification for the Relegation group
16	Spartak Varna	30	3	8	19	27	60	−33	17	Qualification for the Relegation group

Source: soccerway, Bulgarian Football
Rules for classification: 1) Points; 2) Head-to-head points; 3) Head-to-head goal difference; 4) Head-to-head goals scored; 5) Head-to-head away goals scored (only if two teams); 6) Goal difference; 7) Goals scored; 8) Fairplay ranking; 9) Draw.

=== Results ===
Home \ Away	ARD	BSZ	BPD	BVR	CHM	CSK	CSS	HEB	LEV	LPD	LSO	LUD	PIR	SEP	SLA	SPV
Arda	—	1–0	2–1	1–1	2–2	0–1	1–3	1–0	0–3	5–0	2–2	1–2	0–0	3–2	1–0	2–0
Beroe	2–0	—	1–1	2–1	0–2	1–3	1–4	0–2	0–1	2–0	1–1	0–4	1–0	1–2	0–1	3–1
Botev Plovdiv	0–2	1–0	—	6–0	3–4	2–0	0–1	0–1	0–1	1–1	0–0	0–2	3–1	3–1	1–0	1–1
Botev Vratsa	0–0	2–0	3–2	—	0–2	1–0	0–4	0–0	0–2	0–1	2–1	0–4	0–0	0–0	1–0	1–0
Cherno More	1–1	1–1	1–2	1–0	—	0–0	0–2	1–0	0–0	2–1	2–1	2–3	1–0	3–0	1–0	3–2
CSKA 1948	1–0	4–0	2–1	5–2	0–0	—	0–1	2–0	1–0	1–0	2–0	2–2	2–1	1–0	0–1	2–0
CSKA Sofia	3–0	5–1	3–1	5–1	1–0	2–1	—	4–0	0–0	1–1	0–0	0–1	2–1	1–0	2–0	1–0
Hebar	0–1	1–1	1–2	0–2	0–1	0–1	0–4	—	0–2	1–2	3–2	1–3	0–0	1–3	0–3	0–0
Levski Sofia	2–0	1–0	1–0	2–0	0–1	0–0	2–0	4–0	—	1–1	1–0	0–0	1–0	2–0	1–2	5–0
Lokomotiv Plovdiv	1–0	0–0	1–0	0–0	3–0	1–3	0–1	2–1	1–0	—	1–0	2–3	2–1	2–1	3–0	3–1
Lokomotiv Sofia	1–1	1–2	2–0	1–0	0–1	0–6	1–1	1–4	3–2	0–0	—	1–0	2–0	1–1	1–0	3–2
Ludogorets	1–1	2–1	1–0	8–1	3–2	1–1	2–1	6–0	0–0	2–0	1–0	—	0–1	3–1	2–1	5–0
Pirin Blagoevgrad	1–1	0–0	2–4	2–1	0–1	1–1	0–1	2–0	1–1	0–0	0–1	0–4	—	1–4	1–2	3–1
Septemvri Sofia	0–1	3–1	2–1	1–1	0–0	1–3	0–1	1–1	0–0	0–1	0–3	0–3	0–1	—	1–2	1–1
Slavia Sofia	1–0	2–0	0–0	2–1	1–0	1–1	0–2	0–1	2–1	1–1	2–1	1–2	2–0	1–0	—	2–2
Spartak Varna	1–3	0–4	3–2	2–1	0–0	3–3	0–1	0–1	2–2	0–2	1–2	1–2	1–1	2–0	0–1	—

Source: Bulgarian Football
Legend: Blue = home team win; Yellow = draw; Red = away team win.
For upcoming matches, an "a" indicates there is an article about the rivalry between the two participants.

=== Results by round ===
Team ╲ Round	1	2	3	4	5	6	7	8	9	10	11	12	13	14	15	16	17	18	19	20	21	22	23	24	25	26	27	28	29	30
Arda	L	W	W	W	L	L	W	W	L	D	D	W	D	D	D	L	L	W	W	W	L	W	L	L	D	L	W	D	D	D
Beroe	W	L	D	L	L	D	L	W	L	W	L	L	D	L	D	L	W	W	L	D	L	L	D	L	W	L	L	W	L	L
Botev Plovdiv	L	L	L	L	L	D	L	W	L	W	L	W	L	W	L	W	W	L	D	L	W	W	L	D	L	D	D	L	W	L
Botev Vratsa	L	W	D	L	L	W	L	L	L	L	W	L	D	L	L	W	L	D	D	W	L	W	L	D	L	D	L	D	W	L
Cherno More	W	W	L	D	W	W	W	L	D	W	L	W	D	D	D	W	L	L	W	D	W	L	L	W	W	W	W	D	D	W
CSKA 1948	W	D	D	W	W	W	W	L	W	L	W	W	D	W	D	D	W	D	W	L	W	W	L	W	W	W	W	D	D	L
CSKA Sofia	W	D	W	W	W	W	W	W	W	W	L	W	L	W	W	W	D	W	W	W	W	D	W	W	W	D	W	L	W	W
Hebar	W	L	L	L	W	L	L	D	L	L	L	L	W	L	D	L	D	L	L	D	W	L	L	L	L	D	L	W	L	W
Levski Sofia	L	W	L	D	W	D	W	W	W	L	W	W	W	D	D	D	D	L	L	D	D	W	W	W	W	D	W	W	W	L
Lokomotiv Plovdiv	W	L	W	W	W	D	L	L	W	W	W	L	W	W	D	D	L	W	D	L	W	D	D	D	W	L	L	W	D	W
Lokomotiv Sofia	L	D	D	W	W	D	L	W	L	W	W	W	L	W	D	L	L	L	D	D	L	L	W	W	L	W	L	L	L	D
Ludogorets Razgrad	W	W	D	W	W	D	W	W	W	W	D	L	W	W	W	W	W	D	W	W	D	L	W	W	W	W	W	W	W	W
Pirin Blagoevgrad	L	D	D	L	L	L	L	D	W	D	L	L	D	L	L	D	L	W	L	D	L	W	W	D	D	L	L	L	L	W
Septemvri Sofia	L	W	D	L	L	L	W	L	D	L	L	D	L	D	W	L	D	D	L	D	L	W	W	L	L	L	L	L	L	L
Slavia Sofia	W	L	W	W	L	W	W	L	W	L	W	L	W	L	D	D	W	W	W	L	L	L	W	L	L	W	D	W	D	W
Spartak Varna	L	L	D	L	L	L	L	L	L	L	W	D	L	L	D	D	D	L	L	D	W	L	L	L	L	D	W	L	D	L

Source: Bulgarian Football
W = Win; D = Draw; L = Loss

== Championship round ==
Points and goals will carry over in full from regular season.

Pos	Team	Pld	W	D	L	GF	GA	GD	Pts	Qualification	LUD	CSS	CSK	LEV	LPD	CHM
1	Ludogorets Razgrad (C)	35	26	7	2	81	27	+54	85	Qualification for the Champions League first qualifying round	—	2–2	—	3–2	1–0	—
2	CSKA Sofia	35	26	6	3	65	17	+48	84	Qualification for the Europa Conference League second qualifying round	—	—	1–1	—	1–0	2–0
3	CSKA 1948	35	17	13	5	55	28	+27	64	Qualification for the Europa Conference League second qualifying round	2–2	—	—	2–2	0–0	—
4	Levski Sofia (O)	35	17	10	8	47	22	+25	61	Qualification for the Europa Conference League play-off	—	0–2	—	—	—	2–1
5	Lokomotiv Plovdiv	35	15	9	11	35	34	+1	54 (Note: Head-to-head points: Lokomotiv Plovdiv 3, Cherno More 3. Head-to-head goal difference: Lokomotiv Plovdiv +2, Cherno More -2.)		—	—	—	0–3	—	2–1
6	Cherno More	35	15	9	11	39	35	+4	54		0–1	—	1–1	—	—	—

Source: Soccerway, Bulgarian Football
Legend: Blue = home team win; Yellow = draw; Red = away team win.
Rules for classification: 1) Points; 2) Head-to-head points; 3) Head-to-head goal difference; 4) Head-to-head goals scored; 5) Head-to-head away goals scored (only if two teams); 6) Goal difference; 7) Goals scored; 8) Fairplay ranking; 9) Draw.
(C) Champions; (O) Play-off winners

== Europa Conference League round ==
Points and goals will carry over in full from regular season.

Pos	Team	Pld	W	D	L	GF	GA	GD	Pts	Qualification	ARD	SLA	LSO	BPD
1	Arda	36	16	10	10	47	36	+11	58 (Note: Head-to-head points: Arda 7, Slavia Sofia 4.)	Qualification for the Europa Conference League play-off	—	3–2	3–0	2–1
2	Slavia Sofia	36	17	7	12	37	31	+6	58		0–0	—	2–0	1–0
3	Lokomotiv Sofia	36	11	9	16	37	49	−12	42		1–3	1–1	—	1–2
4	Botev Plovdiv	36	10	6	20	41	49	−8	36		0–3	0–0	0–2	—

Source: Soccerway, Bulgarian Football
Legend: Blue = home team win; Yellow = draw; Red = away team win.
Rules for classification: 1) Points; 2) Head-to-head points; 3) Head-to-head goal difference; 4) Head-to-head goals scored; 5) Head-to-head away goals scored (only if two teams); 6) Goal difference; 7) Goals scored; 8) Fairplay ranking; 9) Draw.

== Relegation round ==
Points and goals will carry over in full from regular season.

Pos	Team	Pld	W	D	L	GF	GA	GD	Pts	Qualification or relegation	PIR	HEB	BVR	BSZ	SEP	SPV
1	Pirin Blagoevgrad	35	8	10	17	28	43	−15	34		—	2–1	2–0	—	—	2–0
2	Hebar	35	9	5	21	30	59	−29	32 (Note: Head-to-head points: Hebar 11, Botev Vratsa 10, Beroe 4.)		—	—	—	3–1	3–1	—
3	Botev Vratsa	35	8	8	19	29	64	−35	32		—	2–3	—	2–0	—	1–1
4	Beroe (O)	35	8	8	19	31	54	−23	32	Qualification for the relegation play-off	1–1	—	—	—	2–0	1–1
5	Septemvri Sofia (R)	35	7	7	21	31	52	−21	28	Relegation to the Second League	2–0	—	3–1	—	—	—
6	Spartak Varna (R)	35	5	10	20	32	65	−33	25	Relegation to the Second League	—	2–1	—	—	1–0	—

Source: Soccerway, Bulgarian Football
Legend: Blue = home team win; Yellow = draw; Red = away team win.
Rules for classification: 1) Points; 2) Head-to-head points; 3) Head-to-head goal difference; 4) Head-to-head goals scored; 5) Head-to-head away goals scored (only if two teams); 6) Goal difference; 7) Goals scored; 8) Fairplay ranking; 9) Draw.
(O) Play-off winners; (R) Relegated

== Europa Conference League play-off ==
11 June 2023
19:00 EEST

Levski Sofia	2–0	Arda
Welton 36', 58'	Report

Vivacom Arena - Georgi Asparuhov, Sofia
Referee: Radoslav Gidzhenov (Plovdiv)

== Promotion/relegation play-off ==
9 June 2023
19:00 EEST

Beroe	1–0	Sportist Svoge
Mara 35'	Report

Stadion Ivaylo, Veliko Tarnovo
Referee: Nikola Popov (Sofia)

== Season statistics ==
=== Top scorers ===
As of 11 June 2023

Rank	Player	Club	Goals
1	(Bulgaria) Ivaylo Chochev	CSKA 1948	21
2	(Haiti) Duckens Nazon	CSKA Sofia	18
3	(Brazil) Igor Thiago	Ludogorets	15
4	(France) Antoine Baroan	Botev Plovdiv	14
4	(Bulgaria) Kiril Despodov	Ludogorets	14
6	(Argentina) Matías Tissera	Ludogorets	12
7	(Mali) Aboubacar Toungara	Beroe / Arda	10
7	(Brazil) Maurício Garcez	CSKA Sofia	10
9	(Colombia) Brayan Perea	Botev Vratsa	9
9	(Colombia) Brayan Moreno	CSKA Sofia	9
9	(Brazil) Ricardinho	Levski Sofia	9

=== Clean sheets ===
As of 11 June 2023

Rank	Goalkeeper	Club	Clean sheets
1	(Bulgaria) Plamen Andreev	Levski Sofia	22
2	(Brazil) Gustavo Busatto	CSKA Sofia	20
3	(Bulgaria) Daniel Naumov	CSKA 1948	14
4	(Netherlands) Sergio Padt	Ludogorets	13
5	(Bulgaria) Ivan Dyulgerov	Cherno More	12
6	(Bulgaria) Krasimir Kostov	Botev Vratsa	11
6	(Bulgaria) Anatoli Gospodinov	Arda	11
8	(Croatia) Dinko Horkaš	Lokomotiv Plovdiv	10
9	(Bulgaria) Svetoslav Vutsov	Slavia Sofia	9
10	(Bulgaria) Aleksandar Lyubenov	Lokomotiv Sofia	8

=== Hat-tricks ===
As of 11 June 2023

Player	For	Against	Result	Date
(Brazil) Maurício Garcez	CSKA Sofia	Arda	3–0 (H)	10 July 2022
(Bulgaria) Ivaylo Chochev^{4}	CSKA 1948	Botev Vratsa	5–2 (H)	6 August 2022
(Netherlands) Elvis Manu	Botev Plovdiv	Botev Vratsa	6–0 (H)	5 November 2022
(Bulgaria) Kiril Despodov	Ludogorets	Cherno More	3–2 (H)	12 March 2023
(Brazil) Igor Thiago	Ludogorets	Botev Vratsa	8–1 (H)	8 April 2023
(Bulgaria) Tonislav Yordanov	Beroe	Spartak Varna	4–0 (A)	9 April 2023
(France) Antoine Baroan	Botev Plovdiv	Pirin Blagoevgrad	4–2 (A)	4 May 2023
(Haiti) Duckens Nazon	CSKA Sofia	Botev Vratsa	5–1 (H)	8 May 2023

Note

^{4} Player scored 4 goals
