= FC Hebar Pazardzhik =

Bulgarian football club

Hebar Pazardzhik
- Full name: Футболен Клуб Хебър Пазарджик (Football Club Hebar Pazardzhik)
- Nickname: Гробарите (The Gravediggers)
- Short name: Хебър (Hebar)
- Founded: 31 May 1918; 108 years ago
- Ground: Stadion Georgi Benkovski
- Capacity: 13,000
- Chairman: Valentin Vasilev
- Manager: Nikolay Mitov
- League: Second League
- 2025–26: Second League, 10th of 17
- Website: hebarfc.com
Home colours	Away colours	Third colours

FC Hebar (Bulgarian: Футболен клуб Хебър) is a Bulgarian professional football club based in Pazardzhik. The club currently competes in the Second League, the second tier of the Bulgarian football league system.

Founded in 1918, Hebar has played at their current home ground, Stadion Georgi Benkovski, since 1989. Hebar has played a total of five seasons in the top level of Bulgarian football, most recently in 2024-25. In 2001, despite finishing ninth in the A Group that season (club's highest finish), the owners of the club moved the assets of the club to Petrich, reforming Belasitsa Petrich. Fans from Pazardzhik re-founded the club the same year, starting from the amateur levels.

== History ==
The current name of the club was chosen in 1979: Hebar-the old Thracian name of the river Maritsa. This is the name that the club has borne for 25 years now. Under this name came the biggest success in the history of the club: participation in the premiership of Bulgaria in 1989/1990, 1991/1992 and 2000/2001.The club has also played 32 seasons in the second division. The team has very devoted supporters, known as the "gravediggers".

The re-founded club, FC Hebar 1918, was formed in July 2015. A year later, Hebar merged with third division club Chiko Byaga.

=== The beginning ===
The first events of the football game in Pazardzhik are related to the name of the teacher Dimitar Tsonev, but Georgi Serbezov, who graduated from the French college in Constantinople, made the most significant contribution to the popularization of football in Pazardzhik. As a teacher in his native town of Tatar Pazardzhik, he has been practicing football since 1916 on the field of the military unit called Lagera (now the Swimming Pool Health Zone), the southern bank of the Maritsa River and the meadows and the main promenade of island. Engineer Lazar Vassilev, a student at that time in Prague, brought the first football ball in the city. At the same time, Georgi Kolarov brought another ball. The game lovers first used a ragged ball later replaced by a rubber one. The fans of football quickly grew, mainly among younger people, and on May 31, 1918, a group of 10 students from the local high school, led by Georgi Serbezov, laid the foundations of the first football club "Hristo Botev", renamed afterwards -port tourist company "Hristo Botev". This is the official date of establishing the first football club in Tatar Pazardzhik.

The club's statute was approved by the Ministry of Education with Order No. 8355 of April 16, 1920. The club's meetings were held in the Hadji's House - by Hadji Pop Tilev. This was a large two-story house, later turned into a school. Soon civilian citizens are also enrolled in the company. His first director was Georgi Serzhevov, as he wrote in the first official bulletin of the "Tatar Pazardzhik Sports Club Hristo Botev 1918!", published in 1925 by Dimitar Barakliyski.

The prints of the first players of Botev Pazardzhik from left to right are also printed: Georgi Serbezov, Stefan Kovachev, Krum Nenov, G. Tsarichkov, Stefan Stefanov, Kiril Stavrev, Georgi Kolarov, Nikola Krivosiev, Atanas Kyoturov, Yordan Snegarov and Vasil Dengubov.

There is also a heart-shaped club badge colored in red and white with the letter "B" in the middle. The players first played with a kit of red jerseys, white shorts and black socks. The first meetings were played with local students or clubs formed by the team. This is also because of the war that ended with the Neuilly Peace Treaty. The first official meeting of Botev Pazardzik was with the team of Levski from Plovdiv on May 25, 1919.

On April 26, 1921, the General Assembly of the company "Hristo Botev" changed the name of the Sports Club "Hristo Botev". Its mainly revised and amended statute was approved on 11 June 1921 by the Ministry of Internal Affairs and Public Health with Order No. 1603. Hristo Botev Sports Club has developed the following types of sports: football (a representative team, second team, teenage team), volleyball, basketball and skiing.

As early as 1918, the Council of the Okolia appointed a club for the club on the right bank of the Maritsa River in Lagera, where the health zone is today. Since the creation of Botev he has been protected by the district or municipal authorities. The administration of Botev, assisted by the Municipality, casts a lot of power, mostly with personal participation, for the construction of its second main playground used until 1956. It happened in 1928, after a storm that destroyed many trees on the island. In 1934 the same is afforested with funds of the Municipality. In the same year (1929) night lighting was installed, but in the evening only friendly matches were played. A pavilion-dressing room with built-in playground used for evening balls was also built. SC "Botev" was the organizer of a special masquerade ball, the so-called "Ball-maske", held every year in the salons of the "Videlina" Chitalishte. The rich artistic and dance program has attracted the elite of the city and many guests. The special dance courses that the sports club has arranged in the Odeon cinema are also famous. There have been rare cases of charity events in the club.

=== City Championship (1921-1941) ===
In 1921, the first matches for the city football championship were organized. Including federated registered sports clubs. Two years later, the teams from Tatar Pazardzhik were included in the Southern Bulgarian Sports League to the Plovdiv District. According to the regulations of our young then Bulgarian National Sports Federation (BNSF) there are conditions for the establishment of a regional sports administration. On January 8, 1925, a congress of the Tatarpazzardzhki Sports Union took place at the Chitalishte "Videlina", which included all sports clubs from the town and those from Belovo, Kozarsko, Perushtitsa, Brestovitsa and Peshtera. Botevist Dimitar Garvanov was chosen as the first chairman. In the 1925 football season Botev won for the first time the championship of the Plovdiv Sports Area. In the same year, the pre-match rule of men to play the adolescents of federal clubs was established.

Achievements Botev Pazardzhik achieved since 1926, when Major Angel Angelov was elected as chairman of the club, for Todor Kamenski, Vice-chairman and Secretary Vladimir Popov - Chief of Staff. editor of the Lacha newspaper. The list of football players who have contributed to the success of the club can be extended by many more names. Organized matches are set up between the city's city championship teams. In a colorful way - launching a rocket from the island of Freedom, it was reported to the citizens that the football game started. From April 11, 1926, the journal of the club "News of Sports Club" Hristo Botev started to appear. It was this year, on 16 July, Botev and SK Levski united under the name "Hristo Botev" Sports Club with the statute, color and emblem of Botev. One of the teen teams was already with a blue team - like Levski's old. In August of the same year, Botev achieved his greatest success in his previous history. In the games for the State Championship and the Royal Cup, the team from Pazardzhik eliminated in the first round the champion of Stara Zagora district Beroe with 4: 0. In the second round, Botev's team defeated the leader of the Orel (Vratza) Vratsa region by 5: 1 and lost to Slavia (Sofia) by 2: 6! This brings a lot of revenue to the club and great recognition for football in the city. At the opening of the Vacha Power Plant in 1929, electricity was fed to Park Ostrova and to the stadium and the first match in Bulgaria for electric lighting between the local Botev and the Austrian workers was held. (The matches played by Levski and Slavia (Sofia) in 1919 are projectors !!!) During the games of those years, there were also no "curiosities" that have reached and "developed" in our days. In 1934 in a game with SK Levski, 4: 2 for Levski, the referee at the end of the match played a penalty in favor of Sofia citizens, which gave rise to a strong protest by Botevci. But the audience interferes and prevents the scandal.

As a regional champion SK Botev participated in the final round for the royal cup in 1935. Botev (Pazardzhik) qualified in the quarter finals, where he beat the team of Pobeda (Pleven) with 7: 1! The semi-final loses Ticha (Varna) with 0: 7!

SK Botev was a town leader from 1918 to 1933, in 1935, 1936 and 1937; the football champion of the Plovdiv region in 1925, 1926, 1927, 1935 and 1936; winner of the Junior Cup of the Plovdiv Region in 1930, 1932 and 1938. In the summer of 1935 he was a touring country in Yugoslavia - Krushevac. He plays against local champion Sk Oblic and defeats him with 5: 1.

More popular coaches were the national competitor of SK Levski Sofia Kiril Yovovich, Nikola Shterev (Starika), Lyuben Manev, Ivan Radoev, Gabrovski and others. The matches in Pazardjik were referred to by Lyuben Manev, Vasil Koev, Vassil Yurtov, Zareh Mesubyan. For responsible matches, judges were appointed from Sofia and Plovdiv, with Judge Boris Lekishev remembered. From 1931 to 1941 only 4 clubs competed in the city football championship: Botev, Levski, Benkovski and Slavia. This is due to the clustering of the clubs and some unions in 1925, as Thracian Pobeda and Rakovski with Botev Botev, Samson with Bar Kohba under the name Bar Kohba, in 1926 Levski and Botev unite until 1928 under the name Botev; Thracian and Slavia become Thracian glory. In 1943, a work club called Ibonit, called the Rubber Factory, was founded and it collapsed in September 1944. Due to the Second World War, the Pazardzhik City Championship was not held in the years 1941–1944.

=== 1945-1959 ===
With the changes that occurred after 09.09.1944, the football in Pazardzhik also changed. So far the existing 4 clubs in the city have joined to form 2 new clubs on June 8, 1945 - Spartak of the Botev and Levski unification, and September of the unification of Slavia and Benkovski. A year later two new clubs were set up in Pazardzhik: Textiles and Dynamo. They competed for only one year because on 8 June 1947 they joined with Spartak and Septemvri. The new club bears the name Chavdar until 1948 and the teams are entirely in white. On September 20, 1948, Chavdar collapsed and two clubs were formed: September and Spartacus. So Pazardzhik has two teams again. In 1949 there was a reorganization in football in the country and in our city formed 7 DSOs (Voluntary Sports Organizations). They are created on a departmental and professional basis as follows:

DSO Spartak - to the Ministry of Interior DSO Dynamo - to the trade unions of postal workers, textiles, food processors, tobacco workers, leatherworkers and others. They play in blue silk teams. DSO Torpedo - to transport workers, metallic, chemical, electro-workers and others DSO Stroitel - to the workers, builders, agricultural and forestry workers. DSO September - to the trade unions' cooperatives DSO Lokomotiv - to Pazardzhik Railway Station DSO The Red Flag - encompasses the administrative, hygienic, cultural, social, theatrical, musical, educational, and so on.

Without being a DSO, the DNA army team also participates in the city championship. The biggest role for the football in the city played two teams - Red Flag and Dynamo. They compete in higher divisions, while other clubs are satisfied only with the city championship. In 1950, Dynamo was included in the Southern B-RAG. Despite finishing in 6th place with 17 points and 25:33 goal difference, the team fell. In 1953 five "B" groups were formed and the Red Flag team was in the Southeast. The existence of the DSO continued until 1957, when it was decided to form societies. In Pazardzhik, this happens as Red Flag is renamed and transformed into a Georgi Benkovski Physical Society and Dinamo becomes a Vasil Levski Physical Society. Benkovski participates in the South Group B while Levski competes in "A" District. This goes on until July 31, 1959, when the two companies unite to form one team "Hristo Botev".

=== 1959-1979 ===
Since 31 July 1959, Pazardzhik has one representative team. The Botev II, which competes in lower divisions, is also set up to make reserves.

After 1959 the team of Botev Pazardzhik competed relatively successfully in the composition of the Southern B-RGC. In August 1957 for the needs of the club was built a new stadium - "Lyuben Shkodrov". At the beginning of the 1960s Pazardzhik developed the workers' sport. Enterprise soccer teams are set up in the city. Most successful is that of the Iskra Rechargeable Plant, which successfully participates in the championship and participates in the competition for the Cup of the country. The team of Botev initially played in red and white, and the emblem is the letter B in the circle. In 1966, when the team entered the "B" group, the teams were striped and were in yellow and black or red and black. In 1970 at a general meeting of the club it was decided that he would be renamed Botev to Maritsa - the name of the river that runs through the city. This is happening during the season and the teams are in blue and yellow or all blue to symbolize the waters of the river. Under this name, the club lasted only three years until 1973. On July 10, 1973, the name of the football club was changed again. This time it was decided that the team be named Georgi Benkovski. During this period Pazardzhik team changed three names and played successfully in the South BFRG and in the Zone Thrace.

During the period 1965-1979 there was also Iskra team in Pazardjik, who competed for the Soviet Army Cup during the 1976–1977 season. In 1992 there was also the Botev (Pazardzhik) team in the regional championship, but it was competing within one or two seasons. In the 1960s, there were many workers' teams.

=== 1979–2012: First promotions to A Group and turbulent times ===
This name was preserved until 1979, when at the General Assembly it was re-changed to Hebar - the Thracian name of the Maritsa River. This name is preserved to this day. In 1985 FBI (Hebei Society for Sport and Sport), Hebar, the club became the Football Club of Hebar. In 1989, the auxiliary playground "Septemvri" was transformed mainly into a project for repair of the old stadium "Lyuben Shkodrov".

In 1989, Hebar Pazardzhik achieved its first-ever participation in the highest stage of football in Bulgaria - "A" RFG. Despite some good results at the end of the season, the team was relegated to the B-RFG. In 1991, the stadium "Septemvri" was renamed to the "Georgi Benkovski" stadium or only "Benkovski" stadium. Hebar returned to "A" RFG next season, but again for only one season. In the following years, Hebar played in the B group (until 1996) and then in the Southwest "V" group (until 2000).

In 2000, the team joined with FC Iskar (Sofia) and for the third time in its history, after winning a playoff, qualified for "A" RFG. The team was called Hebar-Iskar or just PFC Hebar 1920, and finished the season in 9th place. Despite the good performance, the team moved to Petrich in a move to re-establish the local Belasitsa Petrich team.

Hebar was then forced to start from the lowest step in its history: "A" Pazardzhik FRF, where previous reserve teams have been rebuilt before. However, Heber qualified for the Southwest "V" group the same year after winning a playoff. In the third division, Hebar played three seasons and after the 2004–2005 season, they ranked second, earning a promotion for the new "B" Group, made of two divisions. Hebar played two seasons in the Western "B" group before dropping back to the Southwest "V" group. In the first season in the second level, Hebar ranked seventh in the final standings, and in the second the team dropped out of the Western "V" group, ranking in 13th place and from 2007 to 2012, Hebar competed in the Southwest "V" group. In 2012, they finished in 17th place and fell from the "V" group, after which the club ceased to exist.

=== Present: Stability and return to the top level ===
In 2016, the club was rebuilt under the name Heber 1918, united with FC Chiko (Byaga) and played in the renamed Southwest Third League. The new Hebar finished sixth in the final standings with 58 points from 34 games - 18 wins, 4 draws and 12 losses, with a goal difference of 68:41.

In season 2017–18, Hebar finished in second place, 8 points from the champion, CSKA 1948; the two teams competed with each other fiercely and changed the lead several times, although Hebar finished second in the end.

In the 2018–19 season, Hebar was a convincing leader for the majority of the season. Led by former club player Nikolay Mitov, they ended up winning the Southwest Third League, and promoted back to the Second League.

In 2022, Hebar secured promotion to the First League, returning to the top level of Bulgarian football after 21 years. Shortly after winning promotion it was announced that an Italian consortium had purchased the club. This consortium was a previous stakeholder in First League club Tsarsko Selo from Sofia. In the summer of 2022, it was announced that Italian Fulvio Pea was hired as the new coach for the upcoming season, replacing Nikolay Mitov at the helm. The club also announced that it will host home games at the Vasil Levski National Stadium in Sofia, since their home ground, Georgi Benkovski Stadium did not meet the requirements for First League matches, mainly due to the absence of floodlights.

Hebar began the new season in the elite with a shocking win over Europa League participants Botev Plovdiv, 0–1 away in Komatevo. On March 21, 2023, the legend of Bulgarian and European football, Luboslav Penev, was appointed coach of the team. Hebar finished the season in 12th place, only separated from 14th place Beroe Stara Zagora by a positive head-to-head points record. The avoiding of finishing in the relegation spots meant this would be the first time Hebar would play two consecutive seasons in the top flight.

About midway through the 2023–24 season, the municipality of Pazardzhik, which was the main financial backer of the club, announced that it would stop its financing, after the new mayor of the city announced funding for the club would be significantly decreased in order to reallocate the resources for other sectors of the city. In February 2024, the academy of the club announced its closing, due to the reduced financial budget. The club did manage to survive both financially and points-wise, finishing above the relegation zone once more.

== Honours ==
- Second League
  - Winners (2): 1988–89; 1990–91
- Third League
  - Winners (2): 1986–87, 2018–19

== Players ==
=== Current squad ===
As of 1 June 2026

Note: Flags indicate national team as defined under FIFA eligibility rules; some limited exceptions apply. Players may hold more than one non-FIFA nationality.

No.	Pos.	Nation	Player
1	GK	BUL	Boris Gruev
3	DF	BUL	Aleksandar Krastev
4	DF	BUL	Stefan Tsonkov
6	DF	BUL	Miroslav Georgiev
7	MF	BUL	Konstantin Pavlov
9	FW	BUL	Mariyan Vangelov (on loan from Lokomotiv Plovdiv)
10	MF	BRA	Pepê
11	FW	BUL	Pavlin Lyutskanov
17	DF	SEN	Christian Cabo
18	MF	BUL	Plamen Arshev
19	FW	NED	Yahcuroo Roemer

No.	Pos.	Nation	Player
20	DF	BUL	Emil Kuzev
23	MF	BUL	Bozhidar Malinov
27	DF	SVK	Róbert Mazáň (captain)
33	MF	BUL	Ivan Tilev
55	DF	BUL	Martin Mihaylov (vice-captain)
84	MF	BUL	Stiliyan Tisovski
89	DF	FRA	Lucas Kouao
92	MF	BUL	Todor Gergishanov
96	MF	BUL	Dzhaner Sadetinov
98	FW	BUL	Ivaylo Mihaylov
99	GK	BUL	Martin Yankov

For recent transfers, see Transfers summer 2025 and Transfers winter 2025-26.

== Notable players ==
Had international caps for their respective countries, held any club record, or had more than 100 league appearances. Players whose name is listed in bold represented their countries.

Bulgaria

- (Bulgaria) Todor Chavorski
- (Bulgaria) **Simeon Chilibonov**
- (Bulgaria) **Valentin Dartilov**
- (Bulgaria) **Nikolay Donev**
- (Bulgaria) **Vasil Dragolov**
- (Bulgaria) **Vladimir Gadzhev**
- (Bulgaria) **Kamen Hadzhiev**
- (Bulgaria) Oktay Hamdiev
- (Bulgaria) Petar Debarliev
- (Bulgaria) **Andrian Kraev**
- (Bulgaria) **Zdravko Lazarov**
- (Bulgaria) **Vladimir Manchev**
- (Bulgaria) **Veselin Minev**
- (Bulgaria) **Yordan Minev**
- (Bulgaria) **Valentin Naydenov**
- (Bulgaria) **Atanas Pashev**
- (Bulgaria) **Georgi Petkov**
- (Bulgaria) Velizar Popov
- (Bulgaria) **Georgi Slavchev**
- (Bulgaria) **Metodi Tomanov**
- (Bulgaria) **Tsvetelin Tonev**
- (Bulgaria) **Aleksandar Tunchev**
- (Bulgaria) **Kiril Vasilev**
- (Bulgaria) **Vladimir Yonkov**
- (Bulgaria) **Adalbert Zafirov**
- (Bulgaria) **Martin Zafirov**

Europe

- (Estonia) **Matvei Igonen**
- (Slovakia) **Róbert Mazáň**

Africa

- (Cape Verde) **Márcio Rosa**
- (Republic of the Congo) **Juvhel Tsoumou**
- (Tunisia) **Nabil Makni**
- (Madagascar) **Johan N'Zi**

America

- (Curaçao) **Nathan Markelo**

== Statistics and records ==
As of 2 June 2025

**Most appearances for the club in First League**

Rank	Name	Career	Appearances
1	(Bulgaria) **Martin Mihaylov**	2021–2024; 2026–	65
2	(Bulgaria) Petar Debarliev	2019–2024	62
3	(Bulgaria) Kiril Vasilev	1985–1992	56
—	(Bulgaria) Georgi Gadzhev	1987–1994; 1996–1998	56
5	(Bulgaria) Nikolay Nikolaev	2023–2025	55
6	(Bulgaria) Oktay Hamdiev	2019–2024	54
7	(Slovenia) **Róbert Mazáň**	2022–2024; 2025–	51
—	(Bulgaria) Krum Kantarev	1985–1992	51
—	(Bulgaria) Petar Kovachev	1986–1992; 1994–1998	51
10	(Bulgaria) Stoil Petrov	1990–1992	50

**Most goals for the club in First League**

Rank	Name	Career	Goals
1	(Bulgaria) Kiril Vasilev	1985–1992	13
2	(Tunisia) Nabil Makni	2024–2025	9
—	(Bulgaria) Kalin Pehlivanski	1989–1990	9
4	(Bulgaria) Georgi Nikolov	2023–2024	8
5	(Bulgaria) Georgi Tartov	2021–2023; 2024	6
—	(Bulgaria) Martin Deyanov	2000–2001	6
—	(Bulgaria) **Stefan Tsonkov**	2023–2024; 2025; 2026–	6
—	(Bulgaria) Atanas Kabov	2023–2024	6
9	(Bulgaria) Nikolay Minchev	1992–1997; 2000–2003	5
—	(Bulgaria) Petar Penchev	2000–2001	5

- Players in **bold** are still playing for Hebar.

== Club officials ==
=== Board of directors ===
Position	Staff
Executive Director	(Bulgaria) Valentin Vasilev
Board Member	(Bulgaria) Dimcho Ganev
Board Member	(Bulgaria) Yordan Minev
Board Member	(Bulgaria) Gurko Mitev
Board Member	(Bulgaria) Nikolay Ichev
Board Member	(Bulgaria) Zaprin Vazhev
Board Member	(Bulgaria) Lazar Kostov

Last updated: June 2024

=== First Team ===
Management
Administrator	(Bulgaria) Liubka Bikova
Technical staff
Head Coach	(Bulgaria) Nikolay Mitov
Assistant Coach	(Bulgaria) Radoslav Vardarov
Goalkeeper Coach	(Bulgaria) Stoyan Kolev
Fitness Coach	(Bulgaria) Antonio Kantarev
Medical staff
Physioterhapist	(Bulgaria) Ivan Vasilev
Housekeeper	(Bulgaria) Ivan Ivanov

Last updated: June 2024

=== Youth Academy ===
Management
Director of Youth Academy	(Bulgaria) Petar Kosturkov
Youth Coaches
U-17 "Junior A" Coach	(Bulgaria) Spas Gigov
U-16 "Junior B" Coach	(Bulgaria) Kiril Bozhkov
U-15 "Kids A" Coach	(Bulgaria) Ivan Yanchev
U-14 "Kids B" Coach	(Bulgaria) Ivan Andreev
U-13 "Preparatory Group A" Coach	(Bulgaria) Pavel Velov
U-12 "Preparatory Group B" Coach	(Bulgaria) Nedko Minchev
U-11 "Preparatory Group C" Coach	(Bulgaria) Angel Lachov

Last updated: June 2024

=== Press service ===
Position	Name	Nationality
Press officer	Dimitar Komsiyski	(Bulgaria)
Photographer	Gloria Nacheva	(Bulgaria)
**hebarfc.com**	Aleksandar Aleksiev	(Bulgaria)

== Season statistics ==
=== Past seasons ===
Results of league and cup competitions by season
Season	League											Bulgarian Cup	Other competitions		Top goalscorer	
Season	Division	Level	P	W	D	L	F	A	GD	Pts	Pos	Bulgarian Cup	Other competitions		Top goalscorer	
2016–17	South-East Third League	3	34	18	4	12	68	41	+27	58	6th	Not qualified	Cup of Bulgarian Amateur League	N/Q	(Bulgaria) Georgi Georgiev	9
2017–18	South-East Third League	3	34	27	3	4	72	24	+48	84	2nd	Not qualified	Cup of Bulgarian Amateur League	N/Q	(Bulgaria) Stefan Lachov	11
2018–19	South-East Third League	3	34	29	3	2	73	19	+54	90	1st ↑	First Round	Cup of Bulgarian Amateur League	QF	(Bulgaria) Ruslan Ivanov (Bulgaria) Georgi Nedyalkov	16
2019–20	Second League	2	21	10	3	8	35	30	+5	33	6th	First Round			(Bulgaria) Todor Chavorski	11
2020–21	Second League	2	30	13	9	8	50	36	–14	48	6th	Preliminary round			(Bulgaria) Todor Chavorski	10
2021–22	Second League	2	36	22	4	10	54	33	+21	70	2nd ↑	Round of 32			(Bulgaria) Zhivko Petkov	12
2022–23	First League	1	35	9	5	21	30	59	–29	58	13th	Round of 32			(Bulgaria) Georgi Tartov	6
2023–24	First League	1	35	9	7	19	35	49	–14	34	13th	Semi-finals			(Bulgaria) Georgi Nikolov	8
2024–25	First League	1										Qualified				

Key

Champions	Runners-up	Promoted	Relegated

== Hebar in Europe ==
=== Balkans Cup ===
Year	Stage	Match	Results
1991–92	Quarter-finals	Hebar Pazardzhik – (Turkey) Sariyer	1–1, 0–2

== Managers ==
- (Bulgaria) Lyuben Stamboliev (1959–60)
- (Bulgaria) Ivan Kostadinov (1960–62)
- (Bulgaria) Atanas Parzhelov (1962–64)
- (Bulgaria) Nikola Aladzhov (1964–65)
- (Bulgaria) Georgi Razloshki (1965–67)
- (Bulgaria) Dimitar Milev (1967–69)
- (Bulgaria) Ivan Radoev (1969–70)
- (Bulgaria) Kostadin Blagoev (1970)
- (Bulgaria) Georgi Tsvetkov (1971)
- (Bulgaria) Dimitar Milanov (1971)
- (Bulgaria) Ivan Radoev (1971–72)
- (Bulgaria) Nikola Kovachev (1973)
- (Bulgaria) Manol Manolov (1974)
- (Bulgaria) Nikola Kovachev (1974–75)
- (Bulgaria) Dimitar Halachev (1975)
- (Bulgaria) Georgi Chakarov (1975)
- (Bulgaria) Dimitar Kresnyanski (1975)
- (Bulgaria) Dobri Peev (1976)
- (Bulgaria) Dimitar Milev (1976–77)
- (Bulgaria) Petar Zhekov (1977–78)
- (Bulgaria) Angel Nikolov (1978)
- (Bulgaria) Gavril Stoyanov (1978–79)
- (Bulgaria) Tancho Gilev (1979–84)
- (Bulgaria) Trendafil Uzunov (1984–86)
- (Bulgaria) Dimitar Milev (1986–87)
- (Bulgaria) Toncho Prodanov (1987–88)
- (Bulgaria) Kiril Vaglarov (1988–89)
- (Bulgaria) Dimitar Milev (1989–90)
- (Bulgaria) Dimitar Sharankov (1990)
- (Bulgaria) Stefan Grozdanov (1990)
- (Bulgaria) Trendafil Uzunov (1990–91)
- (Bulgaria) Stoil Trankov (1991)
- (Bulgaria) Iliya Iliev (1991–92)
- (Bulgaria) Boris Angelov (1992)
- (Bulgaria) Dinko Dermendzhiev (1992)
- (Bulgaria) Kostadin Kostadinov (1992)
- (Bulgaria) Trendafil Uzunov (1992–93)
- (Bulgaria) Tancho Gilev (1993–94)
- (Bulgaria) Krasimir Uzunov (1994–96)
- (Bulgaria) Yordan Stoykov (1997)
- (Bulgaria) Yordan Katrankov (1997)
- (Bulgaria) Krum Kantarev (1997–98)
- (Bulgaria) Lazar Dimitrov (1998–99)
- (Bulgaria) Asen Milushev (1999)
- (Bulgaria) Petar Kovachev (Sept 5, 1999 – Dec 19, 1999)
- (Bulgaria) Voyn Voynov (Dec 20, 1999 – May 30, 2001)
- (Bulgaria) Tancho Gilev (July 1, 2001 – Oct 12 2002)
- (Bulgaria) Nedelcho Mihaylov (Oct 13, 2002 – Sept 6, 2003)
- (Bulgaria) Petar Kovachev (Sept 10, 2003 – Sept 27, 2003)
- (Bulgaria) Nedelcho Mihaylov (Sept 28, 2003 – Nov 20, 2003)
- (Bulgaria) Lazar Dimitrov (Nov 23, 2003 – June 6, 2005)
- (Bulgaria) Anatoli Nankov (June 27, 2005 – Oct 28, 2005)
- (Bulgaria) Tancho Gilev (Oct 29, 2005 – Jan 7, 2006)
- (Bulgaria) Voyn Voynov (Jan 10, 2006 – June 3, 2006)
- (Bulgaria) Nikola Fotev (July 1, 2006 – June 5, 2007)
- (Bulgaria) Atanas Pashev (Jul 1, 2007 – Aug 26, 2007 )
- (Bulgaria) Nikola Fotev (Aug 28, 2007 – Apr 11, 2008)
- (Bulgaria) Georgi Kutsovski (Apr 12, 2008 – May 16, 2008)
- (Bulgaria) Nikola Fotev (May 18, 2008 – June 30, 2008)
- (Bulgaria) Hristo Marashliev (July 25, 2008 – Nov 14, 2008)
- (Bulgaria) Yordan Petkov (July 1, 2016 – Dec 19, 2016)
- (Bulgaria) Tancho Kalpakov (Dec 19, 2016 – Oct 2, 2018)
- (Bulgaria) Nikolay Mitov (Oct 2, 2018 – June 11, 2022)
- (Italy) Fulvio Pea (June 13, 2022 – Sept 22, 2022)
- (Bulgaria) Vladimir Manchev (Sept 23, 2022 – March 20, 2023)
- (Bulgaria) Lyuboslav Penev (March 21, 2023 – June 4, 2024)
- (Bulgaria) Veselin Velikov (June 10, 2024 – October 1, 2024)
- (Bosnia and Herzegovina) Bruno Akrapović (October 16, 2024 – March 11, 2025)
- (Bulgaria) Velislav Vutsov (March 17, 2025 – May 31, 2025)
- (Bulgaria) Yordan Cholov (June 1, 2025 – Present)

As of 13 June 2022

== Supporters ==
Hebar's fans are one of the most faithful and most temperamental in the country. For years, they have supported teams throughout the country in times of glory (in the "A" group) and fall (in "A" regional). Regardless of the name and class of the rival, the old Lyuben Shkodrov stadium was full of rostrums in the period 1957–1988. The management then decided to expand the capacity of the stadium and eliminate the runway. For this purpose, the "Septemvri" auxiliary playground is urgently reconstructed into a stadium with 10,000 seats, which was extended to its current capacity by 15,000 seats a few months later, and after a year it was renamed to the "Georgi Benkovski" stadium. In the late 1980s and early 1990s, when the team's biggest boom, the fans are constantly on the stadiums and help the players with their support. At the end of Season 88/89, Heber played a decisive game against Academic (Sofia). From the outcome of the match depends on the team's ranking in the "A" group for the next season. The stadium in Kazichane (then Akademik plays their home matches there) is crowded by 4–5,000 fans with green cravats and flags. Hebar wins the match with 3:1, thus virtually assuring his "A "Group. After the match, the Trakia highway is cluttered with cars and buses with flags, which with horns welcome the success of Pajdjekli. At the Hebrew debut in the elite, at the People's Army stadium there are about 4,000 fans from Pazardjik, who do not give in to the voice of one of the biggest guitars in Bulgaria. The match against CSKA in Pazardzhik marks a record of home game attendance. There are 22,000 spectators at the stadium. In their first season in "A", Hebar plays his matches in front of crowded stands. The high attendance and the temperament of the audience make Benkovski stadium the first in Bulgaria, whose stands are fenced.

In the years between 1992 and 2000, Heber wandered between the B and the C Group. Fans followed him everywhere and supported him. This is most evident in the barrage for entering the "A" group when Hebar unites with the team of Iskar (Sofia). The barrage takes place at the "Georgi Asparuhov" stadium in the capital and from Pazardjik dozens of buses and cars arrive for the decisive game. Section "A" is green. After winning 1: 0 over Dobrudja, fans are crazy for joy. Six thousand people enjoyed the third season of the Pajdzhiya team in the elite. Along with the level of domestic championship, the interest of fans is decreasing. The Pazardzhik fans are no exception, and for the last team participation in the "A" group (under the name "Premier League") the average attendance of the domestic games is about 5,000 spectators. This directs the Pazardzhik audience immediately after those of Levski, CSKA, the Plovdiv and Bourgas teams and Beroe (those who usually play in front of crowded audiences).

At the end of the 2000/2001 season the news comes that the club's president moved the team to Petrich. Heber actually starts from scratch - from the mud of the "A" district group. Nevertheless, the most loyal fans follow the teams of villages and palaces, and do not give up on the number of household fans.

In recent years, Hebar has played its home matches in front of crowds of approximately 200–300 spectators, comparable to some teams in the top two divisions. Nevertheless, Benkovski Stadium continues to retain elements of its historically strong atmosphere. Supporters express the hope that attendance will increase in the future, allowing the stadium to once again host larger, unified crowds.

"Pazardzhik has a football team

Hebar is called, hard to beat,

The green flag will always be,

Hebar's glory will always be singing "

Or:

"Who does not bounce or sing,

he does not militate for Hebar!"

and more:

"And to the east, and to the west,

and to the north and the south,

only Hebar, only Hebar,

everything else is rubbish! "

Some interesting facts about fans:

1. Hebar's most extreme fans of the past are called "gravediggers"; In many places in the cities in Bulgaria can still be seen the green graffiti "Grobari Pz"

2. A long time before Bulgaria to talk about "ultras" on every match at the stadium in Pazardzhik there is a banner "ULTRA CLUB HEBAR"

3. In the first season of the new September Stadium (1988/89), the visiting teams were congratulated with a musical greeting on their way to the field

4. Hebar's traveling fans have always been cohesive and dressed in green, although in the late 1980s and early 1990s the team played in yellow-blue, white and red, fans always wear green shawls and flags

5. Very often, Hebar's aggression proves to be more numerous than the household audience at Hebar's visits
