= Petar Debarliev =

Bulgarian footballer

Personal information
- Full name: Petar Ivanov Debarliev
- Date of birth: 19 June 1991 (age 35)
- Place of birth: Plovdiv, Bulgaria
- Height: 1.83 m (6 ft 0 in)
- Position: Goalkeeper

Team information
- Current team: Vihren Sandanski
- Number: 31

Senior career*
Years	Team	Apps	(Gls)
2010–2013	Lyubimets	12	(0)
2013–2014	Botev Galabovo	-	(-)
2014–2015	Oborishte	-	(-)
2015	Gigant Saedinenie	-	(-)
2015–2016	Pirin Razlog	25	(0)
2016–2017	Septemvri Sofia	0	(0)
2017–2024	Hebar Pazardzhik	121	(0)
2025	Sportist Svoge	29	(0)
2026–	Vihren Sandanski	7	(0)
- * Club domestic league appearances and goals as of 11 June 2026

Petar Ivanov Debarliev (born 19 June 1991) is a Bulgarian footballer who plays as a goalkeeper for Bulgarian Second League club Vihren Sandanski.

== Club career ==
In June 2017, he joined Hebar Pazardzhik.
