= List of Bulgarian football transfers summer 2022 =

This is a list of Bulgarian football transfers for the 2022 summer transfer window. Only transfers involving a team from the two professional leagues, First League and Second League are listed.

== First League ==
=== Arda ===
In:

No.	Pos.	Nation	Player
1	GK	BUL	Anatoli Gospodinov (from Etar)
2	DF	BUL	Dzhuneyt Ali (from Beroe)
3	DF	CIV	Oumar Sako (on loan from (Austria) LASK)
6	DF	BUL	Plamen Krachunov (from Lokomotiv Sofia)
20	DF	BUL	Deyan Lozev (from CSKA 1948)
97	FW	BRA	Júnior Palmares (from (Brazil) Manaus)

Out:

No.	Pos.	Nation	Player
1	GK	BUL	Hristiyan Vasilev (to Yantra)
5	DF	BUL	Petko Ganev (to Montana)
7	MF	BUL	Rumen Rumenov (to Spartak Varna)
25	DF	BEN	David Kiki (to (Romania) Farul Constanța)
27	DF	BUL	Martin Kostadinov (to Dunav Ruse)
29	FW	BUL	Georgi Atanasov (on loan to Sportist Svoge)
71	GK	BUL	Martin Lukov (to (Cyprus) Karmiotissa Pano Polemidion)

=== Beroe ===
In:

No.	Pos.	Nation	Player
1	GK	BUL	Ivan Karadzhov (from CSKA 1948)
2	DF	BUL	Dimitar Stoyanov (on loan from Slavia Sofia)
3	DF	BUL	Dimitar Pirgov (from CSKA 1948)
4	MF	SUI	Valentino Pugliese (from Tsarsko Selo)
5	DF	MAD	Thomas Fontaine (from (France) Nancy)
6	DF	POR	Ruca (from (Portugal) Penafiel)
7	MF	BRA	Lucas Willian (from Tsarsko Selo)
8	MF	BUL	Serkan Yusein (from Ludogorets, previously on loan)
9	FW	GBS	Luizinho (from (Portugal) Oliveirense)
11	MF	FRA	Steve Traoré (from (France) Sainte-Geneviève)
13	MF	MAD	Anicet Abel (from (Egypt) Future)
14	DF	BUL	Stilyan Nikolov (from Pirin Blagoevgrad)
17	MF	BUL	Spas Georgiev (from Pirin Blagoevgrad)
18	MF	BUL	Mitko Mitkov (on loan from CSKA Sofia)
19	FW	BUL	Kaloyan Krastev (on loan from CSKA Sofia)
21	FW	CMR	Vinni Triboulet (from (France) Nancy)
44	DF	BUL	Nikolay Nikolaev (from Lokomotiv Plovdiv, previously on loan at Tsarsko Selo)

Out:

No.	Pos.	Nation	Player
2	DF	BUL	Dzhuneyt Ali (to Arda)
3	DF	BUL	Miroslav Enchev (to Zagorets)
4	DF	BUL	Hristo Mitev (to Etar)
5	DF	TUN	Syam Ben Youssef (to (France) Quevilly-Rouen)
6	MF	FRA	Kevin Tapoko (loan return to (Israel) Hapoel Haifa)
7	MF	BUL	Daniel Genov (to Botev Vratsa)
11	FW	SEN	Alioune Fall (to (France) Red Star)
18	MF	SUI	Davide Mariani (end of contract)
20	DF	CPV	Steve Furtado (to CSKA 1948)
21	MF	FRA	Keelan Lebon (to (Kazakhstan) Astana)
26	DF	ISR	Amit Bitton (to (Israel) Bnei Yehuda)
33	GK	UKR	Hennadiy Hanyev (to CSKA 1948)
43	DF	BRA	Johnathan (to CSKA 1948)
99	MF	MTN	Oumar Camara (to (China) Nantong Zhiyun)

=== Botev Plovdiv ===
In:

No.	Pos.	Nation	Player
2	DF	ISR	Roy Herman (from (Israel) Hapoel Ra'anana)
9	FW	CRO	Martin Sekulić (from (Croatia) Rudeš)
20	MF	ESP	Antonio Perera (from (Spain) Alavés B)
24	DF	NED	Jasper van Heertum (from (Netherlands) De Graafschap)
28	FW	NED	Elvis Manu (from (Poland) Wisła Kraków)

Out:

No.	Pos.	Nation	Player
5	DF	MKD	Mario Mladenovski (to (North Macedonia) Shkupi)
26	FW	SWE	Jack Lahne (loan return to (France) Amiens)
28	DF	BUL	Filip Filipov (retired)
—	MF	NGR	Ifeanyi Nduka (to (Russia) Krasnodar, previously on loan)
—	FW	NGR	Olakunle Olusegun (to (Russia) Krasnodar, previously on loan)
—	FW	NGR	Jonathan Okoronkwo (to (Russia) Krasnodar, previously on loan)

=== Botev Vratsa ===
In:

No.	Pos.	Nation	Player
1	GK	ARG	Alan Minaglia (from (Argentina) Nueva Chicago)
3	DF	BUL	Martin Kavdanski (from Tsarsko Selo)
9	MF	BUL	Daniel Genov (from Beroe)
10	MF	COL	Santiago Montoya (from (Colombia) Atlético Cali)
14	DF	BUL	Martin Atanasov (on loan from Slavia Sofia)
17	DF	FRA	Tom Rapnouil (on loan from (France) Toulouse)
20	DF	CGO	Messie Biatoumoussoka (from (Romania) Șelimbăr)
21	FW	FRA	Jean-Pierre Da Sylva (from Septemvri Simitli)
22	DF	BUL	Petar Kepov (from Septemvri Simitli)
23	DF	ARG	Bryan Mendoza (from (Argentina) Sacachispas)
37	MF	FRA	Kléri Serber (on loan from (France) Toulouse)
88	MF	COL	Yhojan Valbuena (free agent)
91	FW	BUL	Ventsislav Hristov (from Tsarsko Selo)
—	DF	BUL	Tsvetoslav Popovchev (from CSKA 1948 II)

Out:

No.	Pos.	Nation	Player
2	DF	BUL	Valeri Hristov (released)
5	DF	BUL	Kostadin Nichev (released)
18	DF	BUL	Iliya Milanov (to Septemvri Sofia)
20	FW	FRA	Mohamed Bentahar (released)
21	FW	BUL	Hristian Petkov (to Spartak Pleven)
33	GK	BUL	Hristo Georgiev (released)
77	DF	BUL	Martin Nikolov (released)
88	MF	BUL	Yoan Baurenski (loan return to CSKA Sofia)
94	MF	BUL	Yuliyan Nenov (to (Montenegro) Sutjeska)

=== Cherno More ===
In:

No.	Pos.	Nation	Player
7	MF	POR	Matheus Clemente (from (Portugal) Felgueiras)
11	MF	BRA	Alex Fernandes (from (Brazil) Santos)
15	DF	CRO	Petar Bosančić (from (Bosnia and Herzegovina) Široki Brijeg)
17	MF	BUL	Angel Angelov (from Chernomorets Balchik)
20	MF	GBS	Madi Queta (from (Portugal) Farense)
88	MF	GBS	Mimito Biai (from (Portugal) Académica de Coimbra)

Out:

No.	Pos.	Nation	Player
7	FW	POR	Rodrigo Vilela (end of contract)
9	FW	UKR	Yevheniy Serdyuk (to CSKA 1948)
16	FW	BUL	Denislav Angelov (to Dobrudzha)
18	MF	BUL	Martin Milushev (on loan to Dobrudzha)
23	MF	ESP	Pablo Álvarez (to (Croatia) Rijeka)
28	DF	MKD	Vlatko Drobarov (to (Bosnia and Herzegovina) Sarajevo)
30	FW	LTU	Julius Kasparavičius (released)
41	DF	MAR	Sami El Anabi (to Spartak Varna)
88	DF	BUL	Pavel Georgiev (on loan to Dobrudzha)

=== CSKA Sofia ===
In:

No.	Pos.	Nation	Player
5	DF	NED	Bradley de Nooijer (from (Romania) Farul Constanța)
7	MF	NOR	Jonathan Lindseth (from (Norway) Sarpsborg 08)
8	MF	BUL	Stanislav Shopov (from (Netherlands) Heerenveen)
9	FW	HAI	Duckens Nazon (from (France) Quevilly-Rouen)
11	MF	SRB	Lazar Tufegdžić (from (Serbia) Spartak Subotica)
18	MF	BUL	Simeon Aleksandrov (from (Bulgaria) Septemvri Sofia)
23	MF	ARM	Zhirayr Shaghoyan (on loan from Ararat-Armenia)
26	MF	COL	Marcelino Carreazo (from (Colombia) Once Caldas)
30	FW	CIV	Daouda Bamba (from (Turkey) Altay)

Out:

No.	Pos.	Nation	Player
5	MF	ARG	Federico Varela (released)
6	MF	FRA	Junior Nzila (loan return to (Switzerland) Chiasso)
7	MF	FRA	Yohan Baï (to (France) Bastia)
8	MF	IRL	Graham Carey (end of contract)
9	FW	ECU	Jordy Caicedo (to (Mexico) Tigres)
14	FW	BUL	Kaloyan Krastev (on loan to Beroe)
18	MF	BUL	Mitko Mitkov (on loan to Beroe)
18	DF	CGO	Bradley Mazikou (end of contract)
23	FW	BUL	Ahmed Ahmedov (end of contract)
23	FW	BUL	Radoslav Zhivkov (on loan to Septemvri Sofia)
24	MF	CRO	Karlo Muhar (loan return to (Poland) Lech Poznań)
26	MF	BUL	Martin Smolenski (on loan to Pirin Blagoevgrad)
29	DF	FIN	Thomas Lam (end of contract)
30	MF	SUR	Yanic Wildschut (to (England) Oxford United)

=== CSKA 1948 ===
In:

No.	Pos.	Nation	Player
2	DF	BRA	Johnathan (from Beroe)
3	DF	BUL	Stefan Tsonkov (from Montana)
5	DF	BRA	Tiago Barbosa (from (Brazil) Internacional)
14	DF	BRA	Héliton (from (Portugal) Covilhã)
17	FW	BRA	Henrique (from (Portugal) Marítimo)
19	DF	CPV	Steve Furtado (from Beroe)
25	FW	UKR	Yevheniy Serdyuk (from Cherno More)
33	GK	UKR	Hennadiy Hanyev (from Beroe)
39	MF	TJK	Parvizdzhon Umarbayev (from Lokomotiv Plovdiv)
44	DF	BUL	Angel Granchov (from Maritsa Plovdiv)
58	MF	BRA	Octávio (from Lokomotiv Sofia)
77	DF	BUL	Arhan Isuf (from Spartak Varna)
99	FW	BUL	Radoslav Kirilov (from Slavia Sofia)

Out:

No.	Pos.	Nation	Player
1	GK	BUL	Dimitar Todorov (to Montana)
3	DF	BUL	Dimitar Pirgov (to Beroe)
6	DF	BUL	Deyan Lozev (to Arda)
8	MF	BUL	Ivaylo Klimentov (to Spartak Varna)
12	GK	BUL	Ivan Karadzhov (released)
13	DF	BUL	Kristiyan Nikolov (to Dobrudzha)
19	DF	BUL	Georgi Penev (released)
21	DF	BUL	Ventsislav Vasilev (to Minyor Pernik)
25	DF	BUL	Georgi Angelov (released)
33	MF	BUL	Galin Ivanov (end of contract)
37	MF	BUL	Emil Martinov (to (Azerbaijan) Sabail)
68	MF	BUL	Vasil Shopov (to Spartak Pleven)
71	DF	BUL	Aleksandar Georgiev (released)
77	DF	BUL	Krum Stoyanov (end of contract)
90	FW	BUL	Martin Toshev (to Spartak Varna)
91	MF	BUL	Stefan Statev (to Dobrudzha)

=== Hebar ===
In:

No.	Pos.	Nation	Player
9	FW	UKR	Aderinsola Eseola (from (Ukraine) Vorskla Poltava)
10	DF	BUL	Plamen Krumov (from Tsarsko Selo)
15	DF	SRB	Milan Kremenović (on loan from (Italy) Frosinone)
17	FW	NED	Arsenio Valpoort (from (Indonesia) Persebaya Surabaya)
19	DF	FRA	Moussa Sylla (from (France) Cholet)
22	GK	SEN	Khadim Ndiaye (on loan from (Italy) Atalanta Primavera)
23	MF	ITA	Claudio Bonanni (from (Malta) Birkirkara)
25	DF	POR	Mauro Cerqueira (from (Hungary) Újpest)
27	DF	SVK	Róbert Mazáň (from (Cyprus) AEL Limassol)
28	DF	POL	Kornel Osyra (from (Poland) Sandecja)
30	MF	CRO	Bojan Knežević (from (Slovenia) Gorica)
38	DF	UKR	Hlib Bukhal (from (Ukraine) Kryvbas Kryvyi Rih)
55	DF	UKR	Oleksiy Lobov (from (Ukraine) Obolon Kyiv)
97	MF	FRA	Vincent Marcel (from Lokomotiv Plovdiv)
—	MF	ESP	Patrik Ngingi (from (Italy) Roma U19)
—	FW	ENG	Rodel Richards (from (England) Tottenham Hotspur U23)

Out:

No.	Pos.	Nation	Player
3	DF	BUL	Aleksandar Bastunov (to Sportist Svoge)
6	DF	BUL	Ivaylo Naydenov (to Lokomotiv Sofia)
8	MF	BUL	Evgeni Ignatov (to Litex Lovech)
9	FW	BUL	Zhivko Petkov (released)
10	FW	BUL	Kitan Vasilev (released)
17	FW	POR	James Lima (released)
18	DF	BUL	Radoslav Terziev (to Etar)
20	MF	BUL	Zhak Pehlivanov (released)
23	FW	BUL	Stoycho Papazov (released)
24	DF	BUL	Tomislav Papazov (released)
25	GK	BUL	Ivaylo Vasilev (released)
26	MF	BUL	Martin Valchinov (to Litex Lovech)
33	MF	BUL	Georgi Karakashev (to Lokomotiv Plovdiv)
34	MF	BUL	Oleg Dimitrov (to Etar)
—	FW	ENG	Rodel Richards (released)

=== Levski Sofia ===
In:

No.	Pos.	Nation	Player
2	DF	FRA	Jeremy Petris (from Tsarsko Selo)
4	MF	CUW	Nathan Holder (from (Netherlands) Groningen U21)
10	MF	BUL	Ivelin Popov (from (Russia) Sochi)
12	MF	NGR	Shehu Abdullahi (from (Cyprus) Omonia)
18	FW	BRA	Ronaldo (from (Brazil) Bahia)
21	DF	CRO	Ante Blažević (from (Bosnia and Herzegovina) Željezničar)
33	DF	PAN	José Córdoba (from Etar, previously on loan)

Out:

No.	Pos.	Nation	Player
4	DF	BUL	Ivan Goranov (loan return to (Belgium) Charleroi)
10	MF	BUL	Radoslav Tsonev (to Pirin Blagoevgrad)
11	MF	BUL	Zdravko Dimitrov (on loan to Spartak Varna)
20	MF	BUL	Dimitar Kostadinov (to Septemvri Sofia)
91	DF	SUI	Dragan Mihajlović (to (Switzerland) Bellinzona)

=== Lokomotiv Plovdiv ===
In:

No.	Pos.	Nation	Player
3	DF	BRA	Luan (from (Austria) Admira Wacker)
6	MF	BUL	Sami Mehmedov (from Maritsa Plovdiv)
7	FW	BEL	Babacar Dione (from (Belgium) Mouscron)
10	FW	BRA	Giovanny (from (Brazil) Tombense)
13	DF	BRA	Matheus Silva (from (Portugal) Moreirense)
15	MF	CIV	Pierre Zebli (from Tsarsko Selo)
21	FW	BRA	Ewandro (from (Brazil) Náutico)
23	GK	CRO	Dinko Horkaš (from (Croatia) Dinamo Zagreb II)
33	MF	BUL	Georgi Karakashev (from Hebar)
—	DF	BUL	Bozhidar Zelyamov (from Oborishte)

Out:

No.	Pos.	Nation	Player
4	DF	FRA	Christian Gomis (end of contract)
7	MF	TJK	Parvizdzhon Umarbayev (end of contract)
8	MF	BUL	Emil Yanchev (to Pirin Blagoevgrad)
10	MF	FRA	Vincent Marcel (to Hebar)
16	MF	BRA	Lucas Salinas (to (Israel) Ashdod)
71	GK	GER	Lukas Raeder (released)
—	DF	BUL	Nikolay Nikolaev (to Beroe)

=== Lokomotiv Sofia ===
In:

No.	Pos.	Nation	Player
11	FW	BRA	França (from (Brazil) Brasil de Pelotas)
21	DF	BUL	Kamen Hadzhiev (from (Uzbekistan) Pakhtakor)
22	MF	BUL	Ivaylo Naydenov (from Hebar)
33	DF	BRA	Alan Dias (from (Brazil) Criciúma)
39	FW	BUL	Antonio Vutov (from (Hungary) Mezőkövesd)
70	MF	BUL	Dimo Bakalov (from Tsarsko Selo)
94	MF	BUL	Yuliyan Nenov (from (Montenegro) Sutjeska)
97	DF	BRA	Kadu (from (Brazil) Criciúma)

Out:

No.	Pos.	Nation	Player
2	DF	BUL	Stoycho Atanasov (released)
5	DF	GRE	Georgios Katsikas (to (Cyprus) Nea Salamis Famagusta)
6	DF	BUL	Plamen Krachunov (to Arda Kardzhali)
19	DF	GRE	Ivan-Ioannis Atanatos (released)
22	MF	BUL	Vladimir Semerdzhiev (end of contract)
25	MF	CRO	Frane Čirjak (to (Bosnia and Herzegovina) Sarajevo)
58	MF	BRA	Octávio (to CSKA 1948)
93	FW	FRA	Virgile Pinson (released)

=== Ludogorets ===
In:

No.	Pos.	Nation	Player
6	MF	POL	Jakub Piotrowski (from (Germany) Fortuna Düsseldorf)
15	DF	BRA	Pedro Henrique (from (Brazil) Internacional)
16	DF	NOR	Aslak Fonn Witry (from (Netherlands) AZ Alkmaar)
17	FW	GBS	Jorginho (loan return from (Poland) Wisła Płock)
20	MF	BRA	Nonato (from (Brazil) Internacional)
30	MF	BRA	Pedro Naressi (from (Brazil) Ceará)

Out:

No.	Pos.	Nation	Player
7	MF	BRA	Alex Santana (to (Brazil) Athletico Paranaense)
19	FW	CYP	Pieros Sotiriou (to (Japan) Sanfrecce Hiroshima)
22	DF	COD	Jordan Ikoko (end of contract)
30	DF	SUR	Shaquille Pinas (to (Sweden) Hammarby)
51	DF	BUL	Ilker Budinov (on loan to Spartak Varna)
88	MF	BUL	Wanderson (end of contract)
99	FW	ESP	Higinio Marín (to (Spain) Albacete)
—	DF	POR	Josué Sá (to (Portugal) Rio Ave)
—	MF	BUL	Serkan Yusein (to Beroe, previously on loan)

=== Pirin Blagoevgrad ===
In:

No.	Pos.	Nation	Player
7	FW	BUL	Kitan Vasilev (from Hebar)
8	MF	BUL	Emil Yanchev (from Lokomotiv Plovdiv)
11	FW	BUL	Andrey Yordanov (from Tsarsko Selo)
13	DF	BUL	Kaloyan Todorov (from Sportist Svoge)
17	MF	BUL	Radoslav Tsonev (from Levski Sofia)
18	MF	BUL	Martin Smolenski (on loan from CSKA Sofia)
20	MF	LAT	Cebrail Makreckis (from (Germany) Viktoria Berlin)

Out:

No.	Pos.	Nation	Player
8	DF	BUL	Orlin Starokin (released)
11	MF	BUL	Stanislav Manolev (retired)
14	DF	BUL	Stilyan Nikolov (to Beroe)
17	MF	BUL	Spas Georgiev (to Beroe)
18	MF	BUL	Svetoslav Dyakov (retired)
71	FW	BUL	Anton Karachanakov (to (Romania) Politehnica Iași)
—	MF	BUL	Daniel Ivanov (to Sozopol)

=== Septemvri Sofia ===
In:

No.	Pos.	Nation	Player
9	MF	BUL	Dimitar Kostadinov (from Levski Sofia)
12	GK	BUL	Ivan Vasilev (from Kostinbrod)
13	DF	BUL	Martin Nikolov (from Botev Vratsa)
14	FW	MKD	Martin Stojanov (from (North Macedonia) Bregalnica Štip)
15	DF	BUL	Viktor Zorov (from Chavdar Etropole)
17	FW	BUL	Radoslav Zhivkov (on loan from CSKA Sofia)
19	FW	ALB	Redi Kasa (loan return from Tsarsko Selo)
20	FW	BUL	Martin Petkov (from Slavia Sofia)
25	MF	BIH	Mirza Delimeđac (from (Serbia) Novi Pazar)
26	DF	BUL	Iliya Milanov (from Botev Vratsa)

Out:

No.	Pos.	Nation	Player
1	GK	BUL	Nikolay Bankov (released)
13	MF	BUL	Panayot Paskov (to Sozopol)
14	FW	MKD	Mario Ilievski (to (Hungary) Kisvárda)
17	MF	BUL	Simeon Aleksandrov (to CSKA Sofia)
20	MF	BUL	Vladislav Uzunov (released)

=== Slavia Sofia ===
In:

No.	Pos.	Nation	Player
9	FW	BUL	Ahmed Ahmedov (from CSKA Sofia)
33	MF	BUL	Galin Ivanov (from CSKA 1948)
55	DF	MKD	Konstantin Cheshmedjiev (from (North Macedonia) Shkupi)

Out:

No.	Pos.	Nation	Player
5	DF	BUL	Martin Atanasov (on loan to Botev Vratsa)
6	DF	BUL	Konstantin Ivanov (to Yantra)
7	FW	ESP	Jon Bakero (to (Spain) Pontevedra)
9	FW	BUL	Martin Petkov (released)
10	FW	BUL	Radoslav Kirilov (to CSKA 1948)
14	MF	BLR	Nikita Nikolayevich (released)
15	DF	BUL	Martin Georgiev (to (Spain) Barcelona B)
18	MF	BUL	Dimitar Stoyanov (on loan to Beroe)
20	MF	BUL	Borislav Tsonev (loan return to (Ukraine) Chornomorets Odesa)
29	DF	MKD	Gjoko Zajkov (loan return to (Ukraine) Vorskla Poltava)
55	FW	BUL	Aleksandar Ivanov (released)

=== Spartak Varna ===
In:

No.	Pos.	Nation	Player
1	GK	BUL	Hristiyan Karastoykov (from Botev Plovdiv II)
6	DF	BRA	Emanuel (from (Brazil) Grêmio)
8	MF	BUL	Ivaylo Klimentov (from CSKA 1948)
12	GK	BUL	Hristiyan Hristov (from CSKA 1948 II)
14	MF	PAN	Romeesh Ivey (from (Panama) Independiente, previously on loan at Etar)
22	DF	MAR	Sami El Anabi (from Cherno More)
23	DF	FRA	Prosper Mendy (from (Belgium) Virton)
24	MF	CUW	Liandro Martis (from Montana)
27	DF	BUL	Plamen Dimov (from (Lithuania) Riteriai)
30	MF	BUL	Bozhidar Vasev (from Minyor Pernik)
33	MF	BUL	Zdravko Dimitrov (on loan from Levski Sofia)
51	DF	BUL	Ilker Budinov (on loan from Ludogorets)
77	MF	BUL	Rumen Rumenov (from Arda)
90	FW	BUL	Martin Toshev (from CSKA 1948)
—	MF	GHA	Mohammed Fatau (from (Iraq) Zakho SC)
—	MF	UKR	Ruslan Chernenko (from (Ukraine) Ahrobiznes Volochysk, previously on loan at Marek Dupnitsa)

Out:

No.	Pos.	Nation	Player
1	GK	BUL	Stanislav Nistorov (to Etar)
4	DF	BUL	Petar Patev (released)
8	MF	BUL	Georgi Georgiev (released)
12	GK	BUL	Hristian Slavov (released)
13	DF	BUL	Arhan Isuf (released)
14	MF	BUL	Veselin Lyubomirov (released)
23	DF	BUL	Martin Vasilev (released)
27	FW	BUL	Ivan Kolev (released)
71	FW	BUL	Georgi Chukalov (released)
—	DF	BUL	Nikolay Vasilev (released)
—	MF	UKR	Ruslan Chernenko (to (Ukraine) Obolon Kyiv)

== Second League ==
=== Belasitsa ===
In:

No.	Pos.	Nation	Player
2	MF	CMR	Kufre Eta (from (Cameroon) Best Stars de Limbe)
4	FW	BUL	Iliya Karapetrov (from Pirin Gotse Delchev)
9	FW	BUL	Mariyan Vangelov (from Pirin II)
11	FW	BUL	Steven Kirilov (from CSKA 1948 II)
17	FW	BUL	Zapro Dinev (from Minyor Pernik)
19	DF	BUL	Hristo Petrov (from Pirin II)
21	FW	BUL	Georgi Stanimirov (from (Portugal) Castrense)
25	GK	BUL	Dimitar Pangev (from Chavdar Etropole)
55	DF	BUL	Vladimir Gogov (from (Romania) Academica Clinceni)
—	FW	BRA	Igor Felipe (from (Brazil) São Raimundo)

Out:

No.	Pos.	Nation	Player
10	MF	BUL	Daniel Pehlivanov (to Montana)
17	MF	BUL	Ivan Valchanov (to Rilski Sportist)
18	MF	BUL	Lyubomir Hristov (to Strumska Slava)
25	GK	BUL	Boris Gruev (to Vitosha Bistritsa)

=== Botev Plovdiv II ===
In:

No.	Pos.	Nation	Player
4	DF	FRA	Hugo Azzi (from (Spain) Alcorcón B)

Out:

No.	Pos.	Nation	Player
1	GK	BUL	Hristiyan Karastoykov (to Spartak Varna)
9	FW	BUL	Ivan Vasilev (to Yantra Gabrovo)
16	MF	BUL	Dimitar Proychev (to Montana)
18	FW	BUL	Georgi Trifonov (to Krumovgrad)
67	DF	BUL	Ventsislav Bogdanov (to Krumovgrad)
71	MF	BUL	Petar Vutsov (to Sozopol)
77	DF	BUL	Stefan Popov (to Maritsa)
99	FW	BUL	Emil Kolev (to Yantra)

=== CSKA 1948 II ===
In:

No.	Pos.	Nation	Player
15	DF	BUL	Preslav Petrov (from Yantra Gabrovo)
67	GK	BUL	Hristo Kovachev (from Dobrudzha)

Out:

No.	Pos.	Nation	Player
5	DF	BUL	Mihail Minkov (to Montana)
27	FW	BRA	Juninho (on loan to (Bahrain) Al-Najma)
28	MF	BUL	Emanuil Lichev (to Montana)
44	DF	BUL	Kostadin Iliev (to Strumska Slava)
51	DF	BUL	Boris Ivanov (to Litex)
56	DF	BUL	Bogdan Kostov (to Sportist Svoge)
64	DF	BUL	Hristo Kaymakanski (released)
66	FW	BUL	Steven Kirilov (to Belasitsa Petrich)
67	GK	BUL	Hristiyan Hristov (to Spartak Varna)
70	DF	BUL	Tsvetoslav Popovchev (to Botev Vratsa)

=== Dobrudzha ===
In:

No.	Pos.	Nation	Player
6	DF	BUL	Pavel Georgiev (from Cherno More)
9	FW	BUL	Denislav Angelov (from Cherno More)
18	DF	BUL	Petko Tsankov (from Ludogorets Razgrad II)
25	GK	BUL	Denislav Zhekov (from Slavia Sofia)
67	MF	BUL	Ivan Trenchev (from Sozopol)
72	DF	BUL	Kristiyan Nikolov (from CSKA 1948)
77	MF	BUL	Martin Milushev (from Cherno More)
87	MF	BUL	Stefan Statev (from CSKA 1948)
—	DF	BUL	Daniel Stoyanov (from Montana)
—	DF	FRA	Jami Djegherif (from (Germany) Inter Leipzig)
—	MF	FRA	Osman Sheriff

Out:

No.	Pos.	Nation	Player
4	MF	BUL	Yakub Idrizov (released)
17	MF	BUL	Petar Petrov (to Litex)
25	GK	BUL	Hristo Kovachev (to CSKA 1948 II)
45	FW	SEN	Yaya Sow (released)
77	MF	BUL	Denislav Stanchev (released)
99	MF	MDA	Grigore Coscodan (released)
—	DF	BUL	Daniel Zlatkov (released)

=== Dunav Ruse ===
In:

No.	Pos.	Nation	Player
17	MF	FRA	Hugo Komano (from (Slovenia) Tabor Sežana)
22	DF	BUL	Stoyan Predev (from Montana)
23	FW	BUL	Miroslav Budinov (from Krumovgrad)
66	MF	BUL	Nikola Kolev (from Yantra)
77	DF	BUL	Martin Kostadinov (from Arda)
—	MF	BUL	Denislav Minchev (from Slivnishki Geroy)

Out:

No.	Pos.	Nation	Player
7	FW	BUL	Kristian Taskov (released)
17	MF	BUL	Martin Petkov (released)

=== Etar ===
In:

No.	Pos.	Nation	Player
9	FW	BUL	Zhivko Petkov (from Hebar)
13	GK	BUL	Stanislav Nistorov (from Spartak Varna)
15	DF	BUL	Georgi Angelov (from CSKA 1948)
17	MF	BUL	Evgeniy Iliev (from Marek Dupnitsa)
18	DF	BUL	Radoslav Terziev (from Hebar)
19	FW	PAN	Javier Betegón (from (Panama) C.A. Independiente)
21	FW	BUL	Borislav Trendafilov (from Chavdar Etropole)
23	DF	BUL	Hristo Mitev (from Beroe)
25	DF	BUL	Krum Stoyanov (from CSKA 1948)
30	MF	VEN	Alejandro Goncalves (from (Venezuela) Aragua)
34	MF	BUL	Oleg Dimitrov (from Hebar)

Out:

No.	Pos.	Nation	Player
8	FW	BUL	Hristo Markov (to Pavlikeni)
10	FW	BUL	Tsvetomir Todorov (released)
13	GK	BUL	Anatoli Gospodinov (to Arda)
14	MF	BUL	Radoslav Apostolov (to Maritsa Plovdiv)
16	FW	POR	Wilson Filipe (released)
17	MF	PAN	Romeesh Ivey (loan return to (Panama) C.A. Independiente)
21	DF	BUL	Atanas Krastev (released)
22	FW	CRO	Lovre Knežević (end of contract)
23	FW	BUL	Hristo Dimitrov (released)
24	MF	BUL	Borislav Markov (to Akademik Svishtov)
29	DF	BUL	Nikolay Dichev (released)
—	DF	PAN	José Córdoba (to Levski Sofia, previously on loan)

=== Krumovgrad ===
In:

No.	Pos.	Nation	Player
2	DF	BUL	Dilyan Georgiev (from Oborishte)
3	DF	BUL	Kaloyan Pehlivanov (from CSKA Sofia II)
6	DF	BUL	Kostadin Nichev (from Botev Vratsa)
13	FW	BRA	Henrique Devens (from (Lithuania) Dainava)
14	FW	MDA	Alexandru Osipov (from (Moldova) Sfîntul Gheorghe)
18	FW	BUL	Georgi Trifonov (from Botev Plovdiv II)
19	FW	BUL	Mariyan Tonev (from Maritsa)
23	MF	BUL	Vladislav Uzunov (from Septemvri Sofia)
98	DF	BUL	Ventsislav Bogdanov (from Botev Plovdiv II)

Out:

No.	Pos.	Nation	Player
2	DF	BUL	Dimitar Kalchev (to Spartak Pleven)
3	DF	BUL	Martin Simeonov (to Spartak Pleven)
4	DF	BRA	Léo Príncipe (to (Slovenia) Primorje)
14	MF	BUL	Borimir Karamfilov (released)
18	MF	ALB	Aurel Musai (released)
19	FW	BUL	Olcay Aliev (released)
23	FW	BUL	Miroslav Budinov (released)
99	FW	BUL	Stefan Hristov (released)

=== Litex Lovech ===
In:

No.	Pos.	Nation	Player
4	DF	BUL	Boris Ivanov (from CSKA 1948 II)
6	FW	BUL	Yoan Lozanov (on loan from CSKA Sofia II)
8	MF	BUL	Evgeni Ignatov (from Hebar)
10	MF	BUL	Hristo Mladenov (from Septemvri Simitli)
11	MF	BUL	Martin Valchinov (from Hebar)
15	DF	BUL	Georgi Radev (from Sozopol)
17	MF	BUL	Petar Petrov (from Dobrudzha)
97	DF	BUL	Slavi Kosov (from Septemvri Simitli)
34	FW	CRO	Ante Matic (on loan from CSKA Sofia II)
88	FW	CRO	Moreno Vušković (from (Croatia) Inter Zaprešić)
—	FW	BUL	Pavel Zhabov (on loan from CSKA Sofia II)

Out:

No.	Pos.	Nation	Player
4	DF	BUL	Dzheyhan Zaydenov (released)
7	FW	BUL	Radoslav Zhivkov (loan return to CSKA Sofia)
11	DF	BUL	Galin Minkov (released)
17	MF	BUL	Mark-Emilio Papazov (loan return to CSKA Sofia)
19	MF	BUL	Mitko Mitkov (loan return to CSKA Sofia)
22	DF	BUL	Plamen Nikolov (retired)
34	DF	BUL	Aleksandar Buchkov (loan return to CSKA Sofia)

=== Ludogorets II ===
In:

No.	Pos.	Nation	Player
53	MF	BUL	Dimitar Gospodinov (from Ludogorets III)
58	DF	BUL	Dimitar Iliev (from Botev Vratsa)
72	FW	BUL	Petar Kirev (from Ludogorets U17)
—	FW	BUL	Ozan Ramzi (from Ludogorets III)

Out:

No.	Pos.	Nation	Player
53	DF	BUL	Petko Tsankov (end of contract)

=== Maritsa ===
In:

No.	Pos.	Nation	Player
8	MF	BUL	Radoslav Apostolov (from Etar)
23	MF	BUL	Douglas Ivanof (from (Belgium) Kortrijk)
24	MF	BUL	Stefan Popov (from Botev Plovdiv II)

Out:

No.	Pos.	Nation	Player
6	MF	BUL	Sami Mehmedov (to Lokomotiv Plovdiv)
8	MF	BUL	Aleksandar Pramatarov (to Minyor Pernik)
16	MF	BUL	Yanko Angelov (released)
24	DF	BUL	Angel Granchov (to CSKA 1948)
87	FW	BUL	Mariyan Tonev (to Krumovgrad)

=== Minyor Pernik ===
In:

No.	Pos.	Nation	Player
17	MF	BUL	Martin Petkov (from Dunav Ruse)
21	DF	BUL	Ventsislav Vasilev (from CSKA 1948)
23	MF	GRE	Petros Bakoutsis (from (Greece) Almopos Aridea)
27	MF	BUL	Aleksandar Pramatarov (from Maritsa Plovdiv)
30	DF	BUL	Mihael Orachev (from Sozopol)

Out:

No.	Pos.	Nation	Player
4	DF	BUL	Dimitar Savov (released)
6	MF	BUL	Simeon Rusev (released)
13	MF	BUL	Dobromir Bonev (released)
14	MF	BUL	Chetin Sadula (released)
17	FW	BUL	Zapro Dinev (released)
23	DF	BUL	Pavlin Chilikov (to Chernomorets Burgas)
27	DF	BUL	Petar Voynov (released)
30	MF	BUL	Bozhidar Vasev (to Spartak Varna)

=== Montana ===
In:

No.	Pos.	Nation	Player
4	DF	BUL	Martin Sandov (from Sportist Svoge)
5	DF	BUL	Petko Ganev (from Arda)
7	MF	BUL	Toni Ivanov (from Yantra Gabrovo)
8	MF	BUL	Emanuil Lichev (from CSKA 1948 II)
15	MF	BUL	Dimitar Proychev (from Botev Plovdiv II)
16	DF	BUL	Ivan-Ioannis Atanatos (from Lokomotiv Sofia)
20	MF	ALG	Hadi Bentebbal (from (Luxembourg) Racing-Union)
23	MF	BUL	Daniel Pehlivanov (from Belasitsa Petrich)
24	DF	BUL	Mihail Minkov (from CSKA 1948 II)
—	GK	BUL	Dimitar Todorov (from CSKA 1948)

Out:

No.	Pos.	Nation	Player
2	DF	BUL	Stoyan Predev (end of contract)
5	DF	BUL	Daniel Stoyanov (released)
7	MF	CUW	Liandro Martis (to Spartak Varna)
8	DF	BUL	Aleks Todorov (released)
15	DF	BUL	Viktor Stoykov (released)
21	DF	BUL	Aleksandar Bashliev (released)
23	FW	BEL	Ayman Kassimi (released)
33	DF	BUL	Stefan Tsonkov (end of contract)
99	MF	BUL	Sergey Georgiev (released)

=== Sozopol ===
In:

No.	Pos.	Nation	Player
4	MF	BUL	Petar Vutsov (from Botev Plovdiv II)
5	DF	BUL	Petar Genchev (from Levski Lom)
16	MF	BUL	Daniel Ivanov (from Slivnishki Geroy)
20	MF	BUL	Panayot Paskov (from Septemvri Sofia)
32	MF	BUL	Erik Pochanski (from Sevlievo)
—	MF	BUL	Georgi Penev (from CSKA 1948)
—	MF	BUL	Daniel Ivanov (from Pirin Blagoevgrad)
—	MF	COL	Eduardo Manjarrés (from (Colombia) Barranquilla F.C.)
—	FW	COL	Lacides Mendez (from (Colombia) Unión Magdalena)

Out:

No.	Pos.	Nation	Player
5	DF	BUL	Georgi Radev (released)
9	DF	BUL	Ventsislav Slavov (released)
10	MF	BUL	Yani Nikolov (released)
11	DF	BUL	Petar Kyumurdzhiev (retired)
17	MF	BUL	Simeon Baev (to Nesebar)
27	MF	BUL	Ivan Trenchev (released)
39	DF	BUL	Mihael Orachev (to Minyor Pernik)

=== Spartak Pleven ===
In:

No.	Pos.	Nation	Player
2	DF	BUL	Dimitar Kalchev (from Krumovgrad)
3	DF	BUL	Martin Simeonov (from Krumovgrad)
9	FW	BUL	Stefan Hristov (from Krumovgrad)
10	MF	BUL	Vasil Shopov (from CSKA 1948)
11	DF	BUL	Vasil Bozhinov (from Septemvri Simitli)
12	GK	BUL	Bogomil Tsintsarski (from Yantra Gabrovo)
14	MF	BUL	Borimir Karamfilov (from Krumovgrad)
18	MF	BUL	Rusi Chernakov (from Strumska Slava)
—	FW	BUL	Hristian Petkov (from Botev Vratsa)

Out:

No.	Pos.	Nation	Player
1	GK	BUL	Ivan Georgiev (to Etar II)
22	MF	BUL	Mariyan Ognyanov (released)
—	MF	BUL	Kris Dimitrov (to Vihar Slavyanovo)
—	FW	NGR	Daniel Christopher (to (Austria) Eferding/Fraham)

=== Sportist Svoge ===
In:

No.	Pos.	Nation	Player
14	FW	BUL	Georgi Atanasov (on loan from Arda)
15	FW	BUL	Svetoslav Dikov (from (Poland) Sandecja)
16	DF	BUL	Bogdan Kostov (from CSKA 1948 II, previously on loan at Strumska Slava)
20	MF	BUL	Vladimir Semerdzhiev (from Lokomotiv Sofia)
21	DF	BUL	Aleksandar Bastunov (from Hebar)
77	GK	BUL	Ivaylo Vasilev (from Hebar)
—	FW	BUL	Aleksandar Ivanov (from Slavia Sofia)

Out:

No.	Pos.	Nation	Player
5	DF	BUL	Kaloyan Todorov (released)
7	DF	BUL	Martin Sandov (released)
18	FW	BUL	Dimitar Atanasov (released)
21	MF	BUL	Ivaylo Mihaylov (released)
22	MF	ALG	Ayoub Tazouti (to (Algeria) ES Sétif)
80	MF	BUL	Krasimir Panchev (to Strumska Slava)

=== Strumska Slava ===
In:

No.	Pos.	Nation	Player
4	DF	BUL	Antonio Arsov (from Marek)
7	FW	BUL	Tsvetomir Tsanev (on loan from CSKA 1948 II)
9	FW	BUL	Aleksandar Aleksandrov (from Kyustendil)
10	MF	BUL	Lyubomir Hristov (from Belasitsa)
15	FW	BUL	Lachezar Georgiev (from Levski Lom)
17	MF	BUL	Krasimir Panchev (from Sportist Svoge)
91	DF	BUL	Kostadin Iliev (on loan from CSKA 1948 II)
—	GK	BUL	Vasil Valchev (from Lokomotiv Mezdra)
—	MF	BUL	Aleksandar Vasilev (from Lokomotiv Sofia)

Out:

No.	Pos.	Nation	Player
10	FW	AUS	Milislav Popovic (to (Luxembourg) Victoria Rosport)
15	DF	BUL	Bogdan Kostov (loan return to CSKA 1948 II)
88	MF	BUL	Rusi Chernakov (to Spartak Pleven)
99	GK	BUL	Simeon Simeonov (to Bdin)

=== Vitosha Bistritsa ===
In:

No.	Pos.	Nation	Player
1	GK	BUL	Boris Gruev (from Belasitsa Petrich)
90	FW	BUL	Georgi Bozhilov (from Septemvri Simitli)
—	MF	BUL	Chetin Sadula (from Minyor Pernik)

Out:

No.	Pos.	Nation	Player

=== Yantra ===
In:

No.	Pos.	Nation	Player
1	GK	BUL	Hristiyan Vasilev (from Arda)
2	DF	BUL	Valeri Hristov (from Botev Vratsa)
4	DF	BUL	Konstantin Ivanov (from Slavia Sofia)
7	FW	BUL	Emil Kolev (from Botev Plovdiv II)
17	FW	BUL	Ivan Vasilev (from Botev Plovdiv II)
19	MF	BUL	Ivaylo Mihaylov (from Sportist Svoge)
22	MF	BUL	Dobromir Bonev (from Minyor Pernik)

Out:

No.	Pos.	Nation	Player
2	MF	BUL	Milen Savov (released)
4	DF	BUL	Plamen Tenev (to Zagorets)
5	DF	BUL	Denis Dinev (loan return to Levski Sofia II)
7	MF	BUL	Hristiyan Kozhuharov (to Yantra Polski Trambesh)
12	GK	BUL	Bogomil Tsintsarski (released)
18	MF	BUL	Hristiyan Chipev (released)
21	FW	BUL	Filip Kolev (to Lokomotiv Plovdiv II)
22	MF	BUL	Nikola Kolev (to Dunav Ruse)
25	DF	BUL	Preslav Petrov (released)
71	MF	BUL	Toni Ivanov (to Montana)
73	FW	BUL	Rostislav Danchev (to Yantra Polski Trambesh)
—	MF	BUL	Vladislav Misyak (to Boruna Tsareva Livada)
