= List of Bulgarian football transfers winter 2022–23 =

This is a list of Bulgarian football transfers for the 2022-23 winter transfer window. Only transfers involving a team from the two professional leagues, First League and Second League are listed.

== First League ==
=== Arda ===
In:

No.	Pos.	Nation	Player
7	MF	MLI	Aboubacar Toungara (from Beroe)
9	FW	BUL	Preslav Borukov (from Lokomotiv Plovdiv)
21	MF	BUL	Radoslav Tsonev (from Pirin Blagoevgrad)
29	FW	BUL	Georgi Atanasov (loan return from Sportist Svoge)
70	MF	FRA	Chahreddine Boukholda (from (Portugal) Mafra)
99	FW	BUL	Stanislav Ivanov (from (United States) Chicago Fire)

Out:

No.	Pos.	Nation	Player
9	FW	BUL	Tonislav Yordanov (to Beroe)
29	MF	BUL	Slav Petkov (on loan to Sportist Svoge)
70	MF	BUL	Hristo Ivanov (to Lokomotiv Plovdiv)
80	MF	BUL	Lachezar Kotev (to (Russia) Khimki)

=== Beroe ===
In:

No.	Pos.	Nation	Player
2	DF	BRA	Gustavo Cascardo (from (Brazil) Confiança)
3	DF	GNB	Saná Gomes (on loan from (Hungary) Debreceni)
4	DF	SEN	Boubacar Traorè (from (Ukraine) Metalist Kharkiv)
5	DF	SRB	Zarija Lambulić (from (Serbia) Mladost Novi Sad)
6	DF	CRO	Maks Čelić (from (Italy) Messina)
7	MF	BUL	Yoan Baurenski (from CSKA Sofia)
10	MF	ALB	Uerdi Mara (on loan from (Turkey) Ankara Keçiörengücü)
11	MF	BUL	Denislav Stanchev (from Dobrudzha)
13	MF	ROU	Romario Moise (from (Romania) Rapid București)
14	DF	BRA	Pedro Henrique (on loan from Ludogorets)
18	DF	BRA	Klaidher Macedo (from (Brazil) Grêmio Anápolis)
44	DF	BUL	Atanas Yordanov (from Botev Plovdiv II)
98	FW	BUL	Tonislav Yordanov (from Arda)

Out:

No.	Pos.	Nation	Player
2	DF	BUL	Dimitar Stoyanov (loan return to Slavia Sofia)
3	DF	BUL	Dimitar Pirgov (to Krumovgrad)
4	MF	SUI	Valentino Pugliese (end of contract)
5	DF	MAD	Thomas Fontaine (to (Turkey) Gençlerbirliği)
6	DF	POR	Ruca (to (Portugal) Académica de Coimbra)
7	MF	BRA	Lucas Willian (to Sportist Svoge)
9	FW	GNB	Luizinho (to (Portugal) Felgueiras)
10	MF	MLI	Aboubacar Toungara (to Arda)
11	MF	FRA	Steve Traoré (to (Belarus) Shakhtyor Soligorsk)
13	MF	MAD	Anicet Abel (to (Israel) Maccabi Bnei Reineh)
14	DF	BUL	Stilyan Nikolov (to Montana)
18	MF	BUL	Mitko Mitkov (loan return to CSKA Sofia)
44	DF	BUL	Nikolay Nikolaev (to Hebar)

=== Botev Plovdiv ===
In:

No.	Pos.	Nation	Player
5	MF	BUL	Krasian Kolev (from Septemvri Sofia)

Out:

No.	Pos.	Nation	Player
7	FW	FRA	Mohamed Brahimi (on loan to (Russia) Fakel Voronezh)
8	MF	BUL	Todor Nedelev (to Ludogorets)
10	MF	GHA	Emmanuel Toku (to (Belgium) OH Leuven)
14	MF	BUL	Biser Bonev (on loan to Krumovgrad)
22	MF	FRA	Réda Rabeï (on loan to (Russia) Fakel Voronezh)
23	MF	BUL	Dimitar Tonev (on loan to Pirin Blagoevgrad)
26	MF	RUS	Mikhail Prokopjev (released)
28	FW	NED	Elvis Manu (on loan to (Netherlands) Groningen)
84	GK	BUL	Hristiyan Slavkov (on loan to Etar)

=== Botev Vratsa ===
In:

No.	Pos.	Nation	Player
10	MF	BRA	Lukas Brambilla (from (Qatar) Al-Mesaimeer)
11	MF	BUL	Momchil Tsvetanov (from (Greece) Anagennisi Karditsa)
14	FW	FRA	Marco Majouga (from (France) Dunkerque)
30	DF	BUL	Petko Ganev (from Montana)

Out:

No.	Pos.	Nation	Player
1	GK	ARG	Alan Minaglia (released)
10	MF	COL	Santiago Montoya (released)
11	FW	BUL	Viktor Vasilev (released)
14	DF	BUL	Martin Atanasov (loan return to Slavia Sofia)
88	MF	COL	Yhojan Valbuena (released)
—	DF	BUL	Tsvetoslav Popovchev (on loan to Minyor Pernik)

=== Cherno More ===
In:

No.	Pos.	Nation	Player
7	FW	BRA	Matheus Machado (from (United Arab Emirates) Khor Fakkan)
9	FW	BUL	Atanas Iliev (from (Italy) Ascoli)
19	DF	BUL	Aleksandar Vasilev (from Lokomotiv Plovdiv)
33	MF	BRA	Michael (from (Portugal) Praiense)
35	MF	SUI	Arlind Dakaj (from (Switzerland) Winterthur)
—	FW	POR	Edgar Pacheco (from (Portugal) B-SAD)

Out:

No.	Pos.	Nation	Player
7	MF	POR	Matheus Clemente (to (Cyprus) Akritas Chlorakas)
19	FW	MTQ	Mathias Coureur (to (Martinique) Golden Lion)
20	MF	GNB	Madi Queta (to (Portugal) Vilafranquense)
23	MF	BUL	Lachezar Yordanov (on loan to Dobrudzha)
31	FW	ALG	Zakaria Benchaâ (released)
88	MF	GNB	Mimito Biai (to (Romania) Argeș)
—	DF	BUL	Petar Ivanov (on loan to Yantra Gabrovo)
—	MF	BUL	Kalin Georgiev (to Dunav Ruse)
15	DF	CRO	Petar Bosančić (to Riga FC)

=== CSKA Sofia ===
In:

No.	Pos.	Nation	Player
14	MF	NOR	Tobias Heintz (from (Sweden) Häcken)
20	FW	BUL	Radoslav Zhivkov (loan return from Septemvri Sofia)

Out:

No.	Pos.	Nation	Player
14	FW	BUL	Aleksandar Buchkov (on loan to Litex Lovech)
18	MF	BUL	Simeon Aleksandrov (on loan to Septemvri Sofia)
20	MF	BUL	Yoan Baurenski (to Beroe)
24	FW	BUL	Mark-Emilio Papazov (on loan to Hebar)
—	MF	BUL	Mitko Mitkov (to Septemvri Sofia, previously on loan at Beroe)

=== CSKA 1948 ===
In:

No.	Pos.	Nation	Player
3	DF	CGO	Ryan Bidounga (from Lokomotiv Plovdiv)
8	FW	BRA	Pedrinho (from (Brazil) Volta Redonda)
11	MF	BUL	Birsent Karagaren (from Lokomotiv Plovdiv)
—	DF	BUL	Boris Ivanov (loan return from Litex Lovech)
—	DF	BRA	Sidcley (from (Brazil) Cuiabá)

Out:

No.	Pos.	Nation	Player
3	DF	BUL	Stefan Tsonkov (on loan to Hebar)
11	FW	BUL	Denislav Aleksandrov (released)
13	DF	BUL	Arhan Isuf (to Hebar)
46	MF	BUL	Stoyan Stoichkov (on loan to Hebar)

=== Hebar ===
In:

No.	Pos.	Nation	Player
7	MF	BUL	Stoyan Stoichkov (on loan from CSKA 1948)
10	FW	BUL	Mark-Emilio Papazov (on loan from CSKA Sofia)
11	FW	CRO	Loren Maružin (from (Slovenia) NK Bravo)
15	DF	BUL	Kamen Hadzhiev (from Lokomotiv Sofia)
22	GK	CRO	Zvonimir Mikulić (from (Romania) Brașov)
33	DF	BUL	Stefan Tsonkov (on loan from CSKA 1948)
39	FW	CRO	Ante Živković (from (Albania) Kukësi)
44	DF	BUL	Nikolay Nikolaev (from Beroe)
55	MF	BUL	Georgi Valchev (from Slavia Sofia)
99	DF	BUL	Arhan Isuf (from CSKA 1948)

Out:

No.	Pos.	Nation	Player
9	FW	UKR	Aderinsola Eseola (to (Ukraine) Lviv)
10	DF	BUL	Plamen Krumov (released)
11	DF	BUL	Tsvetelin Tonev (released)
12	MF	BUL	Emanuil Manev (released)
15	DF	SRB	Milan Kremenovic (loan return to (Italy) Frosinone)
22	GK	SEN	Khadim Ndiaye (loan return to (Italy) Atalanta Primavera)
23	MF	ITA	Claudio Bonanni (released)
25	DF	POR	Mauro Cerqueira (released)
30	MF	CRO	Bojan Knežević (released)
38	DF	UKR	Hlib Bukhal (end of contract)
55	MF	UKR	Oleksiy Lobov (end of contract)
99	FW	BUL	Todor Chavorski (released)
—	FW	ENG	Rodel Richards (to (Ukraine) Vorskla Poltava)
—	FW	ESP	Patrik Ngingi (released)

=== Levski Sofia ===
In:

No.	Pos.	Nation	Player
9	FW	BRA	Ricardinho (from (Brazil) Grêmio)
11	FW	ESP	Jawad El Jemili (from (Cyprus) Akritas Chlorakas)
20	MF	BUL	Asen Chandarov (from Septemvri Sofia)
50	DF	BUL	Kristian Dimitrov (free agent)

Out:

No.	Pos.	Nation	Player
4	MF	CUW	Nathan Holder (on loan to Spartak Varna)
7	MF	BUL	Georgi Milanov (to (United Arab Emirates) Al Dhafra)
12	MF	NGA	Shehu Abdullahi (released)
—	MF	BUL	Zdravko Dimitrov (on loan to (Turkey) Sakaryaspor, previously on loan to Spartak Varna)

=== Lokomotiv Plovdiv ===
In:

No.	Pos.	Nation	Player
6	MF	BUL	Hristo Ivanov (from Arda)
9	FW	EST	Erik Sorga (from (Sweden) IFK Göteborg)
19	FW	BUL	Denislav Aleksandrov (from CSKA 1948)
30	FW	SLE	Alpha Conteh (from (Sierra Leone) Ibrahim FC)
99	DF	NED	Giovanni Troupée (from (Netherlands) Twente)

Out:

No.	Pos.	Nation	Player
3	DF	BRA	Luan (on loan to Spartak Varna)
9	MF	BUL	Birsent Karagaren (to CSKA 1948)
19	DF	BUL	Aleksandar Vasilev (to Cherno More)
21	FW	BRA	Ewandro (on loan to Spartak Varna)
25	DF	BUL	Hristo Ivanov (released)
39	MF	BUL	Ivan Sulev (to (Italy) Cagliari)
91	DF	CGO	Ryan Bidounga (to CSKA 1948)
99	FW	BUL	Preslav Borukov (to Arda)

=== Lokomotiv Sofia ===
In:

No.	Pos.	Nation	Player
1	GK	GAM	Baboucarr Gaye (from (Germany) SV Rödinghausen)
8	MF	BUL	Martin Raynov (from (Romania) Argeș)
12	DF	BRA	Bruno Franco (from Spartak Pleven)
21	FW	BUL	Stanislav Kostov (from Pirin Blagoevgrad)

Out:

No.	Pos.	Nation	Player
1	GK	BUL	Damyan Damyanov (to Dunav Ruse)
8	MF	BUL	Simeon Slavchev (to (Poland) Wieczysta Kraków)
9	FW	BUL	Iliya Dimitrov (to (Romania) Oțelul)
10	MF	BUL	Valentin Nikolov (on loan to Minyor Pernik)
21	DF	BUL	Kamen Hadzhiev (to Hebar)
45	FW	BUL	Dimitar Mitkov (on loan to (Russia) Rubin Kazan)

=== Ludogorets ===
In:

No.	Pos.	Nation	Player
2	DF	ESP	Pipa (from (Greece) Olympiacos)
7	FW	BRA	Raí Nascimento (from (Brazil) Bahia)
22	DF	ARG	Franco Russo (from (Spain) Mallorca)
61	DF	POR	Dinis Almeida (from (Belgium) Antwerp)
77	FW	BRA	Caio Vidal (from (Brazil) Internacional)
88	MF	BUL	Todor Nedelev (from Botev Plovdiv)

Out:

No.	Pos.	Nation	Player
4	DF	BUL	Cicinho (to (Brazil) Bahia)
15	DF	BRA	Pedro Henrique (on loan to Beroe)
21	DF	SVN	Žan Karničnik (on loan to (Slovenia) Celje)
82	MF	BUL	Ivan Yordanov (on loan to Spartak Varna)
95	MF	BRA	Cauly (to (Brazil) Bahia)
—	DF	BUL	Ilker Budinov (on loan to Pirin Blagoevgrad, previously on loan to Spartak Varna)

=== Pirin Blagoevgrad ===
In:

No.	Pos.	Nation	Player
6	DF	BUL	Vergil Yanev (from Strumska Slava)
8	MF	UKR	Dmytro Semeniv (from (Ukraine) Lviv)
13	MF	BUL	Dimitar Tonev (on loan from Botev Plovdiv)
14	FW	UKR	Danylo Kondrakov (from (Lithuania) Sūduva)
17	DF	BUL	Ilker Budinov (on loan from Ludogorets)
24	MF	BUL	Boris Tyutyukov (from Minyor Pernik)
72	DF	FRA	Rayan Senhadji (from (Algeria) JS Kabylie)
—	MF	BLR	Vladimir Medved (free agent)

Out:

No.	Pos.	Nation	Player
3	DF	BUL	Petar Zanev (retired)
5	DF	BUL	Nikolay Bodurov (released)
6	DF	BUL	Yuliyan Popev (released)
7	FW	BUL	Kitan Vasilev (to Krumovgrad)
8	MF	BUL	Emil Yanchev (released)
17	MF	BUL	Radoslav Tsonev (to Arda)
29	FW	BUL	Stanislav Kostov (released)
31	DF	BUL	Krasimir Stanoev (to Septemvri Sofia)

=== Septemvri Sofia ===
In:

No.	Pos.	Nation	Player
9	FW	BUL	Valentin Yoskov (on loan from CSKA 1948 II)
17	MF	BUL	Simeon Aleksandrov (on loan from CSKA Sofia)
18	MF	CRO	Petar Čuić (from (United States) Tulsa)
19	MF	BUL	Mitko Mitkov (from CSKA Sofia)
20	DF	BUL	Krasimir Stanoev (from Pirin Blagoevgrad)
25	MF	GER	Sebastian Jakubiak (from (Germany) 1. FC Magdeburg)
26	DF	MKD	Konstantin Cheshmedjiev (from Slavia Sofia)
—	DF	MNE	Stefan Milić (on loan from (Croatia) Dinamo Zagreb)
—	FW	MKD	Vlatko Stojanovski (from (North Macedonia) Shkëndija)

Out:

No.	Pos.	Nation	Player
10	MF	BUL	Asen Chandarov (to Levski Sofia)
17	FW	BUL	Radoslav Zhivkov (loan return to CSKA Sofia)
18	MF	BUL	Krasian Kolev (to Botev Plovdiv)
19	FW	ALB	Redi Kasa (to (Albania) Egnatia)
25	MF	BIH	Mirza Delimeđac (to (Albania) Kukësi)
26	DF	BUL	Iliya Milanov (to Dunav Ruse)

=== Slavia Sofia ===
In:

No.	Pos.	Nation	Player
5	DF	SRB	Veljko Jelenković (from (Serbia) Vojvodina)
10	FW	BUL	Vladimir Nikolov (from (Austria) Admira Wacker)
55	DF	FRA	Nathan Gassama (from (France) Cholet)
—	DF	BUL	Dimitar Stoyanov (loan return from Beroe)
—	MF	MKD	Hristijan Georgievski (from (North Macedonia) Skopje)

Out:

No.	Pos.	Nation	Player
19	FW	BUL	Martin Sorakov (on loan to Krumovgrad)
55	DF	MKD	Konstantin Cheshmedjiev (to Septemvri Sofia)
77	MF	BUL	Georgi Valchev (released)
93	MF	FRA	Kemelho Nguena (to (Latvia) Riga)
—	DF	BUL	Martin Atanasov (to Minyor Pernik)
—	DF	BUL	Dimitar Stoyanov (released)
—	MF	MKD	Hristijan Georgievski (to (North Macedonia) Sileks)

=== Spartak Varna ===
In:

No.	Pos.	Nation	Player
3	DF	CIV	Benjamin Karamoko (from (Belgium) Charleroi)
6	DF	BRA	Luan (on loan from Lokomotiv Plovdiv)
7	FW	GER	Leroy-Jacques Mickels (from (Germany) Rot-Weiß Oberhausen)
12	FW	BRA	Ewandro (on loan from Lokomotiv Plovdiv)
17	DF	MDA	Alexandr Belousov (from (Moldova) Sheriff Tiraspol)
20	MF	CUW	Nathan Holder (on loan from Levski Sofia)
22	MF	ESP	Rober Sierra (from (Finland) Inter Turku)
23	FW	GNB	João Mário (from (Portugal) Vilafranquense)
28	FW	BUL	Andrian Dimitrov (from Dobrudzha)
31	GK	POR	Cristiano (from (Romania) Dinamo București)
66	DF	BUL	Aleksandar Tsvetkov (from (Romania) Politehnica Timișoara)

Out:

No.	Pos.	Nation	Player
3	DF	BUL	Ibryam Ibryam (released)
7	FW	BUL	Georgi Babaliev (released)
9	FW	BUL	Mehmed Sabri (released)
10	MF	BUL	Yancho Andreev (released)
12	DF	BUL	Genadi Lugo (to Septemvri Tervel)
17	MF	BUL	Tsvetan Iliev (released)
19	DF	BUL	Nikola Borisov (on loan to Dunav Ruse)
20	MF	BUL	Nikolay Ivanov (to Septemvri Tervel)
22	DF	MAR	Sami El Anabi (released)
23	DF	FRA	Prosper Mendy (released)
33	MF	BUL	Zdravko Dimitrov (loan return to Levski Sofia)
51	DF	BUL	Ilker Budinov (loan return to Ludogorets)
67	GK	BUL	Hristiyan Hristov (released)
90	FW	BUL	Martin Toshev (released)
—	MF	GHA	Mohammed Fatau (released)

== Second League ==
=== Belasitsa ===
In:

No.	Pos.	Nation	Player
—	MF	CIV	Axel Talonsa (from (Ivory Coast) LYS Sassandra)
—	MF	BUL	Georgi Shalamanov-Trenkov (from Strumska Slava)
—	FW	BUL	Plamen Petrov (from (Germany) Hofherrnweiler)

Out:

No.	Pos.	Nation	Player
19	MF	BUL	Iliya Karapetrov (released)
88	MF	BUL	Ayvan Angelov (released)

=== Botev Plovdiv II ===
In:

No.	Pos.	Nation	Player

Out:

No.	Pos.	Nation	Player
4	DF	FRA	Hugo Azzi (on loan to Krumovgrad)
29	FW	BUL	Yusein Kasov (released)
79	DF	BUL	Atanas Yordanov (to Beroe)

=== CSKA 1948 II ===
In:

No.	Pos.	Nation	Player
28	MF	BUL	Emil Tsenov (from Minyor Pernik)
57	GK	BUL	Stanislav Nistorov (from Etar)
67	GK	BUL	Petar Marinov (from Strumska Slava)
71	MF	BUL	Ayvan Angelov (from Belasitsa Petrich)

Out:

No.	Pos.	Nation	Player
71	MF	BUL	Aleksandar Zlatkov (released)
55	FW	BUL	Dimitar Nikolov (released)
98	FW	BUL	Valentin Yoskov (on loan to Septemvri Sofia)

=== Dobrudzha ===
In:

No.	Pos.	Nation	Player
-	GK	BUL	Hristiyan Hristov
-	GK	BUL	Hristo Kovachev
-	DF	BUL	Denis Dinev (loan from Levski)
-	MF	BUL	Valeri Bojinov Jr.
-	MF	BUL	Metin Halil
-	MF	BUL	Lachezar Yordanov (loan from Cherno more)
-	MF	BUL	Radoslav Petrov
-	MF	BUL	Yancho Andreev
-	FW	BUL	Valeri Bojinov (staff)
-	FW	BUL	Andrian Dimitrov-Jivotnoto (on loan from Spartak(Varna))

Out:

No.	Pos.	Nation	Player
1	GK	BUL	Dimitar Iliev (released)
21	DF	BUL	Miroslav Nachev (released)
31	FW	BUL	Andrian Dimitrov (to Spartak Varna)
77	MF	BUL	Denislav Stanchev (to Beroe)
—	GK	BUL	Denislav Zhekov (released)

=== Dunav Ruse ===
In:

No.	Pos.	Nation	Player
8	MF	BUL	Emil Yanchev (from Pirin Blagoevgrad)
10	FW	BUL	Mehmed Sabri (from Spartak Varna)
18	DF	BUL	Iliya Milanov (from Septemvri Sofia)
69	GK	BUL	Damyan Damyanov (from Lokomotiv Sofia)
99	MF	BUL	Kalin Georgiev (from Cherno More)
—	DF	BUL	Nikola Borisov (on loan from Spartak Varna)

Out:

No.	Pos.	Nation	Player
11	MF	BUL	Diyan Dimov (retired)

=== Etar ===
In:

No.	Pos.	Nation	Player
1	GK	BUL	Hristiyan Slavkov (on loan from Botev Plovdiv)
9	FW	BUL	Martin Toshev (from Spartak Varna)
13	GK	BUL	Ivan Dermendzhiev (from Litex)
29	MF	BUL	Yanko Angelov (free agent)

Out:

No.	Pos.	Nation	Player
1	GK	BUL	Hristo Ivanov (retired)
9	FW	BUL	Zhivko Petkov (released)
13	GK	BUL	Stanislav Nistorov (to CSKA 1948 II)
18	DF	BUL	Radoslav Terziev (released)
21	FW	BUL	Borislav Trendafilov (released)
27	MF	BUL	Kaloyan Mitev (released)

=== Krumovgrad ===
In:

No.	Pos.	Nation	Player
7	FW	BUL	Kitan Vasilev (from Pirin Blagoevgrad)
9	FW	BUL	Martin Sorakov (on loan from Slavia Sofia)
12	GK	BUL	Georgi Milev (from Yambol)
18	DF	BUL	Radoslav Terziev (from Etar)
22	MF	BUL	Biser Bonev (on loan from Botev Plovdiv)
—	DF	BUL	Teodor Andreev (from Levski Karlovo)
—	DF	FRA	Hugo Azzi (on loan from Botev Plovdiv II)

Out:

No.	Pos.	Nation	Player
2	DF	BUL	Dilyan Georgiev (to Sportist Svoge)
15	MF	LUX	Henrique Devens (released)
18	FW	BUL	Georgi Trifonov (to Maritsa)

=== Litex Lovech ===
In:

No.	Pos.	Nation	Player
1	GK	BUL	Michael Matev (from Rilski Sportist)
4	MF	BUL	Georgi Staykov (from Gigant Saedinenie)
7	FW	BUL	Yusein Kasov (from Botev Plovdiv II)
10	FW	BUL	Viktor Vasilev (from Botev Vratsa)
34	FW	BUL	Aleksandar Buchkov (on loan from CSKA Sofia)

Out:

No.	Pos.	Nation	Player
4	DF	BUL	Boris Ivanov (to CSKA 1948)
9	FW	BUL	Georgi Georgiev (to Spartak Pleven)
14	MF	BUL	Petar Chalakov (released)
23	MF	BUL	Nikola Georgiev (released)
99	GK	BUL	Ivan Dermendzhiev (to Etar)

=== Ludogorets II ===
In:

No.	Pos.	Nation	Player

Out:

No.	Pos.	Nation	Player

=== Maritsa ===
In:

No.	Pos.	Nation	Player
—	FW	BUL	Georgi Trifonov (from Krumovgrad)
—	FW	BUL	Olcay Aliev (from Chernomorets Burgas)

Out:

No.	Pos.	Nation	Player
14	FW	BUL	Stanimir Dimitrov (released)
66	DF	BUL	Martin Lazov (released)

=== Minyor Pernik ===
In:

No.	Pos.	Nation	Player
10	FW	BUL	Grigor Dolapchiev (from Chernomorets Burgas)
15	DF	BUL	Martin Atanasov (from Slavia Sofia)
18	FW	FRA	Sofiane Dia (from (Norway) Florø)
20	FW	BUL	Aleksandar Stoyanov (from Akademik Svishtov)
—	DF	BUL	Tsvetoslav Popovchev (on loan from Botev Vratsa)
—	MF	ITA	Sedrick Kalombo (from (Italy) Nuova Florida)
—	MF	BUL	Valentin Nikolov (on loan from Lokomotiv Sofia)
—	FW	BRA	Pedrinho (free agent)

Out:

No.	Pos.	Nation	Player
9	FW	BUL	Metodi Kostov (released)
10	MF	BUL	Boris Tyutyukov (to Pirin Blagoevgrad)
15	MF	BUL	Emil Tsenov (to CSKA 1948 II)
17	MF	BUL	Martin Petkov (released)
20	DF	BUL	Bozhidar Tomovski (to Yantra Gabrovo)
23	MF	GRE	Petros Bakoutsis (released)

=== Montana ===
In:

No.	Pos.	Nation	Player
5	DF	MKD	Marko Stojcheski (from (North Macedonia) Lokomotiva Skopje)
7	MF	BUL	Andreas Vasev (from Minyor Pernik)
23	DF	BUL	Anton Tungarov (from Strumska Slava)
30	GK	BUL	Dimitar Iliev (from Dobrudzha)
71	MF	BUL	Anton Karachanakov (from (Romania) Politehnica Iași)

Out:

No.	Pos.	Nation	Player
2	DF	BUL	Mihail Minkov (released)
5	DF	BUL	Petko Ganev (to Botev Vratsa)
7	MF	BUL	Toni Ivanov (to Yantra Gabrovo)
20	MF	ALG	Hadi Bentebbal (released)
23	MF	BUL	Daniel Pehlivanov (released)

=== Sozopol ===
In:

No.	Pos.	Nation	Player
8	MF	BUL	Emanuil Manev (from Hebar)
20	MF	FRA	Johan N'Zi (from (Belgium) La Louvière Centre)
—	FW	BUL	Zhivko Petkov (from Etar)

Out:

No.	Pos.	Nation	Player
1	GK	BUL	Stamen Boyadzhiev (released)
3	DF	BUL	Todor Petkov (released)
4	MF	BUL	Petar Vutsov (released)
8	FW	BUL	Ventsislav Gyuzelev (to Chernomorets Burgas)
13	FW	BUL	Toma Ushagelov (released)
32	MF	BUL	Erik Pochanski (released)
99	MF	BUL	Kristiyan Parashkevov (released)
—	FW	BUL	Zhivko Petkov (to (Israel) Kafr Qasim)

=== Spartak Pleven ===
In:

No.	Pos.	Nation	Player
1	GK	BUL	Stanislav Antonov (from Partizan Cherven Bryag)
7	FW	BUL	Georgi Georgiev (from Litex)

Out:

No.	Pos.	Nation	Player
1	GK	BUL	Aleks Vasilev (to Borislav Parvomay)
7	FW	BUL	Kristiyan Ivanov (released)
16	DF	BUL	Ivan Bakalski (released)
20	MF	BUL	Momchil Kuzmanov (released)
22	DF	BRA	Bruno Franco (to Lokomotiv Sofia)

=== Sportist Svoge ===
In:

No.	Pos.	Nation	Player
3	MF	BUL	Petar Vutsov (from Sozopol)
7	MF	BUL	Slav Petkov (on loan from Arda)
11	DF	BUL	Dilyan Georgiev (from Krumovgrad)
14	MF	BRA	Lucas Willian (from Beroe)
17	MF	ALG	Ayoub Tazouti (from (Algeria) ES Sétif)
22	DF	BUL	Pavlin Chilikov (from Chernomorets Burgas)
23	DF	BUL	Simeon Chatov (from Yantra Gabrovo)

Out:

No.	Pos.	Nation	Player
4	DF	BUL	Ivo Harizanov (to Vitosha Bistritsa)
5	FW	BUL	Georgi Atanasov (loan return to Arda)
77	GK	BUL	Ivaylo Vasilev (released)

=== Strumska Slava ===
In:

No.	Pos.	Nation	Player
10	FW	BUL	Simeon Dimitrov (from Marek)
16	MF	BUL	Ivaylo Stoyanov (from FC Kyustendil)
17	FW	BUL	Steven Kirilov (from Belasitsa Petrich)
71	FW	BUL	Toma Ushagelov (from Sozopol)
—	DF	BUL	Dimitar Stoyanov (from Slavia Sofia)
—	FW	BUL	Kris Valchinov (from Kostinbrod)

Out:

No.	Pos.	Nation	Player
1	GK	BUL	Petar Marinov (to CSKA 1948 II)
3	DF	BUL	Rumen Sandev (to Marek)
19	MF	BUL	Georgi Shalamanov-Trenkov (to Belasitsa Petrich)
22	DF	BUL	Anton Tungarov (to Montana)
88	DF	BUL	Vergil Yanev (to Pirin Blagoevgrad)

=== Vitosha Bistritsa ===
In:

No.	Pos.	Nation	Player
—	DF	BUL	Plamen Krumov (from Hebar)
—	DF	BUL	Ivo Harizanov (from Sportist Svoge)

Out:

No.	Pos.	Nation	Player

=== Yantra ===
In:

No.	Pos.	Nation	Player
15	DF	BUL	Mihail Minkov (from Montana)
71	MF	BUL	Toni Ivanov (from Montana)
—	DF	BUL	Bozhidar Tomovski (from Minyor Pernik)
—	DF	BUL	Petar Ivanov (on loan from Cherno More)
—	FW	BUL	Todor Chavorski (from Hebar)

Out:

No.	Pos.	Nation	Player
3	DF	BUL	Simeon Chatov (to Sportist Svoge)
9	FW	BUL	Ivan Petkov (to Etar II)
