= List of Bulgarian football transfers summer 2023 =

This is a list of Bulgarian football transfers for the 2023 summer transfer window. Only transfers involving a team from the two professional leagues, First League and Second League are listed.

== First League ==
=== Arda ===
In:

No.	Pos.	Nation	Player
2	DF	NGA	Okezie Ebenezer (from (Armenia) Noah)
3	DF	CIV	Oumar Sako (from (Austria) LASK, previously on loan)
8	MF	BUL	Martin Stoychev (on loan from Septemvri Sofia)
18	DF	AZE	Cəlal Hüseynov (from (Azerbaijan) Zira)
30	DF	BUL	Hristo Mitev (from Etar)
36	GK	BUL	Ivan Dichevski (from Spartak Varna)
97	MF	BUL	Lachezar Kotev (on loan from (Russia) Khimki)
—	GK	BUL	Slavi Petkov (loan return from Sportist Svoge)

Out:

No.	Pos.	Nation	Player
2	DF	BUL	Dzhuneyt Ali (to Krumovgrad)
8	DF	BUL	Milen Zhelev (to (Romania) Oțelul Galați)
10	MF	BUL	Svetoslav Kovachev (on loan to (Russia) Akhmat Grozny)
11	MF	BUL	Aleksandar Georgiev (to Krumovgrad)
18	FW	MLI	Lassana N'Diaye (loan return to (Russia) CSKA Moscow)
24	DF	BUL	Aleks Petkov (to (Poland) Śląsk Wrocław)
26	MF	MTN	El Mami Tetah (loan return to (Turkey) Alanyaspor)
36	GK	BUL	Vasil Simeonov (to Montana)
70	MF	FRA	Chano (to Etar)
81	DF	BUL	Atanas Zehirov (released)
97	FW	BRA	Júnior Palmares (released)

=== Beroe ===
In:

No.	Pos.	Nation	Player
1	GK	ARG	Juan Pablo Lungarzo (from (Argentina) Olimpo)
3	DF	ARG	Franco Ramos Mingo (from (Spain) Atlético Levante)
4	MF	ARG	Francesco Celeste (from (Argentina) Los Andes)
5	DF	ARG	Luciano Squadrone (from (Spain) Linares)
6	DF	ECU	Jordi Govea (from (United States) FC Cincinnati 2)
9	FW	ARG	Santiago Godoy (from (Argentina) Racing Club)
10	MF	ARG	Enzo Hoyos (on loan from (Argentina) Chacarita)
11	MF	ARG	Francisco Politino (from (Spain) Mercadal)
15	DF	ARG	Enzo Espinoza (from (Argentina) Santamarina)
17	MF	COL	Edwin Laszo (from (Venezuela) Metropolitanos)
20	MF	ARG	Segundo Pachamé (from (Argentina) Estudiantes II)
21	MF	ARG	Thiago Ceijas (from (Iceland) Grindavík)
23	GK	ARG	Rodrìgo Accinelli (from (Italy) Comiso)
24	MF	BUL	Stefan Gavrilov (from Botev Vratsa)
25	DF	PAR	José Arias (from (Paraguay) Sportivo Luqueño)
98	MF	VEN	Bruno Schmutz (from (Mexico) UNAM)
99	FW	ECU	Mike Cevallos (from (Spain) Grama)
—	FW	ARG	Gonzalo Issa (from (Spain) Lorca Deportiva)

Out:

No.	Pos.	Nation	Player
3	DF	GNB	Saná Gomes (loan return to (Hungary) Debrecen)
4	DF	SEN	Boubacar Traorè (to Botev Vratsa)
5	DF	SRB	Zarija Lambulić (to (Serbia) IMT)
6	DF	CRO	Maks Čelić (to (Bosnia and Herzegovina) Borac Banja Luka)
7	MF	BUL	Yoan Baurenski (to Spartak Varna)
8	MF	BUL	Serkan Yusein (to Krumovgrad)
9	FW	BUL	Kaloyan Krastev (loan return to CSKA Sofia)
10	MF	ALB	Uerdi Mara (loan return to (Turkey) Ankara Keçiörengücü)
13	MF	ROU	Romario Moise (to (Romania) Concordia)
14	DF	BRA	Pedro Henrique (loan return to Ludogorets Razgrad)
15	DF	BUL	Georgi Dinkov (to Septemvri Sofia)
16	MF	BUL	Simeon Mechev (to Lokomotiv Sofia)
17	MF	BUL	Spas Georgiev (to Botev Vratsa)
18	DF	BRA	Klaidher Macedo (to Krumovgrad)
20	MF	BUL	Damyan Yordanov (on loan to (Italy) Lazio U-19)
23	GK	BUL	Ivan Goshev (to Sportist Svoge)
44	DF	BUL	Atanas Yordanov (to Botev Plovdiv II)
73	GK	BUL	Ivan Karadzhov (retired)
98	FW	BUL	Tonislav Yordanov (to Arda)

=== Botev Plovdiv ===
In:

No.	Pos.	Nation	Player
4	FW	NED	Elvis Manu (loan return from (Netherlands) Groningen)
7	FW	FRA	Mohamed Brahimi (loan return from (Russia) Fakel Voronezh)
14	FW	LTU	Faustas Steponavičius (from (Latvia) RFS)
22	MF	FRA	Réda Rabeï (loan return from (Russia) Fakel Voronezh)
92	GK	POL	Daniel Kajzer (from (Poland) Arka Gdynia)
—	DF	GRE	Konstantinos Balogiannis (from (Greece) OFI)
—	MF	BUL	Biser Bonev (loan return from Krumovgrad)
—	MF	BUL	Dimitar Tonev (loan return from Pirin Blagoevgrad)

Out:

No.	Pos.	Nation	Player
1	GK	BUL	Georgi Argilashki (to Dobrudzha)
3	DF	GUI	Pa Konate (end of contract)
4	DF	BUL	Viktor Genev (to Slavia Sofia)
18	DF	FRA	Samuel Souprayen (end of contract)
19	FW	CIV	Ablo Traoré (to (Belgium) Zulte Waregem)
34	MF	BUL	Plamen Tsonchev (to Chernomorets Burgas)
—	GK	BUL	Hristiyan Slavkov (to Cherno More)
—	DF	NGA	Moses Candidus (on loan to Etar)
—	DF	FRA	Hugo Azzi (released)

=== Botev Vratsa ===
In:

No.	Pos.	Nation	Player
10	MF	BUL	Spas Georgiev (from Beroe)
24	MF	BUL	Martin Smolenski (from CSKA Sofia)
77	MF	BUL	Stefan Velev (from Cherno More)

Out:

No.	Pos.	Nation	Player
8	DF	BUL	Diego Ferraresso (to (Romania) Gloria Buzău)
10	MF	BRA	Lukas Brambilla (end of contract)
20	DF	CGO	Messie Biatoumoussoka (to (Morocco) AS FAR)
24	MF	BUL	Stefan Gavrilov (to Beroe)
28	MF	FRA	Kléri Serber (loan return to (France) Toulouse)
37	DF	FRA	Tom Rapnouil (loan return to (France) Toulouse)

=== Cherno More ===
In:

No.	Pos.	Nation	Player
—	GK	BUL	Hristiyan Slavkov (from Botev Plovdiv, previously on loan at Etar)
—	DF	BUL	Petar Ivanov (loan return from Yantra)
—	MF	BUL	Pavel Georgiev (loan return from Dobrudzha)
—	MF	BUL	Martin Milushev (loan return from Dobrudzha)
—	MF	BUL	Lachezar Yordanov (loan return from Dobrudzha)
—	MF	ESP	Pablo Álvarez (from (Croatia) Rijeka)

Out:

No.	Pos.	Nation	Player
22	GK	BUL	Georgi Georgiev (to Spartak Varna)
77	MF	BUL	Stefan Velev (to Botev Vratsa)

=== CSKA Sofia ===
In:

No.	Pos.	Nation	Player
3	DF	GAM	Sainey Sanyang (from (The Gambia) Hawks FC)
11	FW	GLP	Matthias Phaëton (from (France) Grenoble)
12	GK	BUL	Marin Orlinov (from Litex Lovech)
13	DF	COL	Brayan Córdoba (from (Colombia) América de Cali)
17	MF	AUT	Emanuel Šakić (from (Greece) Kifisia)
24	FW	BUL	Mark-Emilio Papazov (loan return from Hebar Pazardzhik)
29	FW	ECU	Michael Estrada (on loan from (Mexico) Toluca)
30	FW	COL	Danilo Asprilla (from (Israel) Beitar Jerusalem)

Out:

No.	Pos.	Nation	Player
3	MF	BRA	Geferson (end of contract)
10	FW	BRA	Maurício Garcez (loan return to (Brazil) Brusque)
12	GK	BUL	Aleks Bozhev (on loan to Litex Lovech)
13	DF	BUL	Galin Minkov (to Lokomotiv Sofia)
17	FW	GHA	Bismark Charles (on loan to Pirin Blagoevgrad)
18	MF	BUL	Simeon Aleksandrov (on loan to Pirin Blagoevgrad)
20	FW	BUL	Radoslav Zhivkov (to Sportist Svoge)
27	FW	BUL	Pavel Zhabov (on loan to Litex Lovech)
30	FW	CIV	Daouda Bamba (to (Turkey) Ümraniyespor)
31	GK	AUS	Iliya Shalamanov-Trenkov (end of contract)
—	DF	BUL	Rosen Marinov (on loan to Litex Lovech)
—	MF	BUL	Aleksandar Buchkov (on loan to Pirin Blagoevgrad)
—	MF	BUL	Martin Smolenski (to Botev Vratsa)
—	MF	BUL	Ivan Mitrev (retired)
—	FW	BUL	Georgi Yomov (end of contract)
—	FW	BUL	Kaloyan Krastev (to Lokomotiv Sofia)

=== CSKA 1948 ===
In:

No.	Pos.	Nation	Player
4	DF	BUL	Miki Orachev (from Lokomotiv Sofia)
6	DF	CMR	Pierre-Daniel N'Guinda (from (France) Le Mans)
7	MF	BRA	Thalis (from (Portugal) Leixões)
9	FW	ISL	Viðar Örn Kjartansson (from (Greece) Atromitos)
13	MF	BUL	Stoyan Stoichkov (loan return from Hebar)
19	FW	CMR	Rooney Eva (from (Azerbaijan) Turan Tovuz)
20	MF	BUL	Antonio Vutov (from Lokomotiv Sofia)
23	DF	BUL	Emil Viyachki (from Slavia Sofia)
24	DF	ALB	Erdenis Gurishta (from (Albania) Vllaznia)
28	MF	SRB	Nedeljko Piščević (from (Bosnia and Herzegovina) Borac Banja Luka)
30	DF	BUL	Stefan Tsonkov (loan return from Hebar)
31	DF	FRA	Tom Rapnouil (from (France) Toulouse, previously on loan to Botev Vratsa)
—	FW	ALG	Aymen Mahious (from (Algeria) USM Alger)

Out:

No.	Pos.	Nation	Player
4	DF	BUL	Angel Lyaskov (to Lokomotiv Plovdiv)
6	MF	GHA	Carlos Ohene (to Hebar)
7	FW	BUL	Mario Topuzov (on loan to (Romania) Steaua București)
9	FW	BUL	Aleksandar Kolev (released)
15	DF	BUL	Sasho Aleksandrov (end of contract)
16	DF	BRA	Sidcley (loan return to (Ukraine) Dynamo Kyiv)
20	MF	BUL	Angel Bastunov (to Hebar)
24	DF	BUL	Lazar Marin (to Hebar)

=== Etar ===
In:

No.	Pos.	Nation	Player
1	GK	BUL	Damyan Hristov (on loan from Ludogorets II)
6	DF	BUL	Plamen Dimov (from Spartak Varna)
10	FW	BUL	Denislav Angelov (from Dobrudzha)
11	DF	BUL	Ilker Budinov (on loan from Ludogorets)
14	FW	BUL	Ivaylo Dimitrov (from Lokomotiv Plovdiv)
22	GK	BUL	Martin Velichkov (from Sportist Svoge)
24	MF	FRA	Chano (from Arda)
38	FW	BUL	Vladislav Naydenov (on loan from Ludogorets II)
70	MF	BUL	Dimo Bakalov (from Lokomotiv Sofia)
77	DF	BUL	Martin Nikolov (from Septemvri Sofia)
—	DF	ECU	Luis Córdova (on loan from (Ecuador) Deportivo Cuenca)

Out:

No.	Pos.	Nation	Player
1	GK	BUL	Hristiyan Slavkov (loan return to Botev Plovdiv)
11	FW	BUL	Daniel Mladenov (Yantra Gabrovo)
17	MF	BUL	Evgeniy Iliev (to Spartak Varna)
20	MF	BUL	Yani Pehlivanov (end of contract)
23	DF	BUL	Hristo Mitev (released)
30	MF	VEN	Alejandro Goncalves (to (Venezuela) Monagas SC)
34	MF	BUL	Oleg Dimitrov (to Dunav Ruse)
45	MF	BUL	Emanuil Lichev (retired)
84	DF	BUL	Zdravko Iliev (retired)

=== Hebar ===
In:

No.	Pos.	Nation	Player
8	MF	GHA	Carlos Ohene (from CSKA 1948)
9	FW	BUL	Georgi Nikolov (from Sportist Svoge)
10	MF	BUL	Angel Bastunov (from CSKA 1948)
11	MF	BUL	Atanas Kabov (from Septemvri Sofia)
24	DF	BUL	Lazar Marin (from CSKA 1948)
32	GK	EST	Matvei Igonen (from (Poland) Podbeskidzie Bielsko-Biała)
43	DF	BRA	João Cesco (from (Brazil) Chapecoense)

Out:

No.	Pos.	Nation	Player
7	MF	BUL	Stoyan Stoichkov (loan return to CSKA 1948 Sofia II)
8	MF	ESP	Álex Serrano (end of contract)
10	FW	BUL	Mark-Emilio Papazov (loan return to CSKA Sofia)
11	FW	CRO	Loren Maružin (released)
15	DF	BUL	Kamen Hadzhiev (released)
17	FW	NED	Arsenio Valpoort (released)
19	DF	FRA	Moussa Sylla (released)
22	GK	CRO	Zvonimir Mikulić (released)
28	DF	POL	Kornel Osyra (end of contract)
33	DF	BUL	Stefan Tsonkov (loan return to CSKA 1948 Sofia II)
39	FW	CRO	Ante Živković (end of contract)
97	MF	FRA	Vincent Marcel (to (France) Orléans)
98	MF	BUL	Georgi Tartov (to Slavia Sofia)

=== Krumovgrad ===
In:

No.	Pos.	Nation	Player
1	GK	BUL	Yanko Georgiev (from Pirin Blagoevgrad)
2	DF	BUL	Dzhuneyt Ali (from Arda)
5	DF	CRO	Matej Šimić (from (Spain) Numancia)
9	FW	BUL	Aleksandar Kolev (from CSKA 1948)
10	MF	BUL	Serkan Yusein (from Beroe)
11	MF	BUL	Aleksandar Georgiev (from Arda)
17	FW	BRA	Patrick Luan (from (Switzerland) Schaffhausen)
18	DF	BRA	Klaidher Macedo (from Beroe)
19	FW	BUL	Andrey Yordanov (from Pirin Blagoevgrad)
44	MF	BUL	Bozhidar Katsarov (from Lokomotiv Sofia)
72	DF	FRA	Rayan Senhadji (from Pirin Blagoevgrad)
88	MF	BRA	Renan Areias (from (Brazil) Cianorte)
91	DF	UKR	Vyacheslav Velyev (from Pirin Blagoevgrad)
—	DF	BRA	Lucas Santana (from (Brazil) Operário)
—	FW	BRA	Bruno Garcia (from (Poland) Miedz Legnica)
—	FW	BRA	Diego Raposo (from (Portugal) União Torreense)

Out:

No.	Pos.	Nation	Player
2	DF	NGA	Moses Candidus (loan return to Botev Plovdiv)
4	DF	BUL	Blagovest Danchev (end of contract)
5	DF	BUL	Dimitar Pirgov (to Dobrudzha)
6	DF	BUL	Kostadin Nichev (retired)
8	FW	BUL	Krasimir Iliev (end of contract)
10	FW	BUL	Ahmed Osman (end of contract)
12	GK	BUL	Georgi Milev (end of contract)
13	DF	COL	Jefferson Granado (loan return to Botev Plovdiv)
15	MF	FRA	Hugo Azzi (loan return to Botev Plovdiv)
18	DF	BUL	Radoslav Terziev (end of contract)
20	MF	BUL	Dzhuneyt Yashar (retired)
23	MF	BUL	Vladislav Uzunov (end of contract)
33	DF	BUL	Atanas Tasholov (to Maritsa)
71	DF	BUL	Tsvetelin Radev (to Yantra)
77	MF	BUL	Kaloyan Stefanov (to Sportist Svoge)
87	MF	GER	Aaron-Xavier Tshimuanga (released)
98	DF	BUL	Ventsislav Bogdanov (to Gigant Saedinenie)

=== Levski Sofia ===
In:

No.	Pos.	Nation	Player
4	MF	CUW	Nathan Holder (loan return from Spartak Varna)
37	MF	BRA	Darlan (from (Brazil) Grêmio)
97	MF	FRA	Hassimi Fadiga (from (France) Le Mans)
—	MF	BUL	Zdravko Dimitrov (loan return from (Turkey) Sakaryaspor)

Out:

No.	Pos.	Nation	Player
10	MF	BUL	Ivelin Popov (to Botev Plovdiv)
21	DF	CRO	Ante Blažević (released)
23	DF	GAM	Noah Sonko Sundberg (to Ludogorets)
30	MF	BUL	Filip Krastev (loan return to (Belgium) Lommel)
71	MF	BUL	Antoan Stoyanov (on loan to (Italy) Empoli)
—	MF	BUL	Zdravko Dimitrov (on loan to Septemvri Sofia)

=== Lokomotiv Plovdiv ===
In:

No.	Pos.	Nation	Player
3	DF	BUL	Kaloyan Kostov (from (Portugal) Benfica B)
9	FW	BUL	Georgi Minchev (from (Latvia) Riga)
16	MF	BUL	Kristiyan Peshov (from Septemvri Sofia)
19	MF	VEN	Christian Mendoza (from (Venezuela) Ureña)
21	FW	BRA	Ewandro (loan return from Spartak Varna)
44	DF	BUL	Angel Lyaskov (from CSKA 1948)
99	MF	BRA	Léo Sena (from (Brazil) Goiás)
—	DF	BRA	Luan (loan return from Spartak Varna)

Out:

No.	Pos.	Nation	Player
1	GK	BUL	Ilko Pirgov (retired)
6	MF	BUL	Hristo Ivanov (to Septemvri Sofia)
9	FW	EST	Erik Sorga (to (Azerbaijan) Sumgayit)
11	MF	BUL	Ivaylo Dimitrov (to Etar)
15	MF	CIV	Pierre Zebli (to (Azerbaijan) Zira)
19	FW	BUL	Denislav Aleksandrov (to Slavia Sofia)
20	DF	SRB	Miloš Petrović (end of contract)
34	MF	BUL	Petar Vitanov (end of contract)
50	DF	CRO	Josip Tomašević (end of contract)

=== Lokomotiv Sofia ===
In:

No.	Pos.	Nation	Player
4	DF	MKD	Dime Dimov (from (North Macedonia) Brera Strumica)
5	DF	CMR	Daniel Kamy (from (Greece) P.A.O. Rouf)
9	FW	BUL	Kaloyan Krastev (from CSKA Sofia)
10	MF	BUL	Valentin Nikolov (loan return from Minyor Pernik)
13	DF	BUL	Galin Minkov (from CSKA Sofia)
20	MF	POR	Diogo Teixeira (from (Portugal) Montalegre)
31	MF	BUL	Krasimir Stanoev (from Septemvri Sofia)
45	FW	BUL	Dimitar Mitkov (loan return from (Russia) Rubin Kazan)
98	FW	FRA	Steve Traoré (from (Belarus) Shakhtyor Soligorsk)

Out:

No.	Pos.	Nation	Player
3	DF	BUL	Mario Petkov (end of contract)
4	DF	BUL	Miki Orachev (to CSKA 1948)
5	DF	MOZ	David Malembana (released)
7	MF	BUL	Aleksandar Aleksandrov (released)
8	MF	BUL	Martin Raynov (released)
13	DF	POR	Celso Raposo (end of contract)
18	MF	BUL	Hristiyan Chipev (released)
21	FW	BUL	Stanislav Kostov (released)
39	MF	BUL	Antonio Vutov (to CSKA 1948)
44	MF	BUL	Bozhidar Katsarov (to Krumovgrad)
70	MF	BUL	Dimo Bakalov (released)
87	DF	BRA	Matheus Duarte (to (Saudi Arabia) Al-Orobah)
94	FW	BUL	Yuliyan Nenov (to (Malta) Ħamrun Spartans)
97	DF	BRA	Kadu Ribeiro (released)

=== Ludogorets ===
In:

No.	Pos.	Nation	Player
9	FW	SUI	Kwadwo Duah (from (Germany) 1. FC Nürnberg)
15	DF	BRA	Pedro Henrique (loan return from Beroe)
17	DF	ESP	Son (from (Spain) Levante)
26	DF	GAM	Noah Sonko Sundberg (from Levski Sofia)
44	DF	GER	Marcel Heister (from (Hungary) Fehérvár)
82	MF	BUL	Ivan Yordanov (loan return from Spartak Varna)
99	FW	BRA	Rwan Cruz (on loan from (Brazil) Santos)
—	FW	ROU	Dorin Rotariu (loan return from (Greece) Atromitos)
—	FW	FRA	Mounir Chouiar (from (Turkey) Başakşehir)

Out:

No.	Pos.	Nation	Player
2	DF	ESP	Pipa (on loan to (England) West Bromwich Albion)
9	FW	BRA	Igor Thiago (to (Belgium) Club Brugge)
11	FW	BUL	Kiril Despodov (to (Greece) PAOK)
20	MF	BRA	Nonato (on loan to (Brazil) Santos)
23	MF	ANG	Show (to (Israel) Maccabi Haifa)
51	DF	BUL	Ilker Budinov (on loan to Etar)
—	FW	ROU	Dorin Rotariu (released)

=== Pirin Blagoevgrad ===
In:

No.	Pos.	Nation	Player
4	MF	MAR	Ayoub Abou (from (Italy) SPAL)
19	MF	FRA	Hugo Komano (from Dunav Ruse)
27	DF	BUL	Georgi Varbanov (from Yantra Gabrovo)
31	DF	BUL	Aleksandar Buchkov (on loan from CSKA Sofia)
33	MF	BUL	Simeon Aleksandrov (on loan from CSKA Sofia)
77	MF	KOS	Gezim Pepsi (from (Switzerland) Vaduz)
83	DF	BUL	Hristo Popadiyn (from Slavia Sofia)
—	FW	BUL	Stanislav Kostov (from Lokomotiv Sofia)

Out:

No.	Pos.	Nation	Player
9	FW	BUL	Preslav Yordanov (to Dobrudzha)
10	MF	BUL	Slavcho Shokolarov (to Dobrudzha)
13	MF	BUL	Dimitar Tonev (loan return to Botev Plovdiv)
17	DF	BUL	Ilker Budinov (loan return to Ludogorets)
18	MF	BUL	Martin Smolenski (loan return to CSKA Sofia)
19	DF	UKR	Vyacheslav Velyev (to Krumovgrad)
20	MF	LVA	Cebrail Makreckis (to (Hungary) Ferencváros)
21	GK	BUL	Yanko Georgiev (to Krumovgrad)
45	MF	BUL	Hristofor Hubchev (to Spartak Varna)
72	DF	FRA	Rayan Senhadji (to Krumovgrad)
91	FW	BUL	Marsel Bibishkov (to (Italy) Juventus U17)

=== Slavia Sofia ===
In:

No.	Pos.	Nation	Player
—	DF	BUL	Viktor Genev (from Botev Plovdiv)
—	DF	MLI	Sibiry Keita (from (Belgium) Eupen)
—	MF	BUL	Georgi Tartov (from Hebar)
—	MF	BUL	Emil Martinov (from (Azerbaijan) Sabail)
—	FW	ESP	Jon Bakero (from (Spain) Pontevedra)
—	FW	BUL	Boris Dimitrov (loan return from Sportist Svoge)
—	FW	BUL	Martin Sorakov (loan return from Krumovgrad)
—	FW	BUL	Denislav Aleksandrov (from Lokomotiv Plovdiv)

Out:

No.	Pos.	Nation	Player
9	FW	BUL	Ahmed Ahmedov (to Spartak Varna)
22	MF	MKD	Darko Tasevski (retired)
23	DF	BUL	Emil Viyachki (to CSKA 1948)
83	DF	BUL	Hristo Popadiyn (released)

== Second League ==
=== Bdin ===
In:

No.	Pos.	Nation	Player

Out:

No.	Pos.	Nation	Player

=== Belasitsa ===
In:

No.	Pos.	Nation	Player
—	MF	BUL	Martin Todorski (on loan from Levski Sofia II)
—	FW	BUL	Borislav Rupanov (on loan from Levski Sofia II)

Out:

No.	Pos.	Nation	Player
20	FW	BUL	Martin Taushanov (released)

=== Chernomorets Balchik ===
In:

No.	Pos.	Nation	Player
—	GK	BUL	Dimitar Iliev (from Montana)
—	GK	BUL	Galin Grigorov (on loan from Cherno More II)
—	DF	BUL	Nasko Yankov (on loan from Cherno More II)
—	MF	BUL	Dani Bonev (from Chernolomets)
—	FW	BUL	Danail Dimov (from (Scotland) Culter)
—	FW	BUL	Marin Petkov (on loan from Cherno More II)

Out:

No.	Pos.	Nation	Player
1	GK	BUL	Ivan Ivanov (released)
8	MF	BUL	Tsvetan Iliev (released)
19	FW	BUL	Georgio Dimitrov (to Septemvri Sofia)

=== Chernomorets Burgas ===
In:

No.	Pos.	Nation	Player
—	GK	BUL	Dimitar Todorov (from Neftochimic)
—	DF	BUL	Marian Dimitrov (from Sozopol)
—	DF	BUL	Petar Genchev (from Sozopol)
—	DF	BUL	Dimitar Zhekov (from Sozopol)
—	MF	BUL	Plamen Tsonchev (from Botev Plovdiv)
—	MF	BUL	Filip Angelov (from Sportist Svoge)
—	MF	BUL	Daniel Ivanov (from Sozopol)
—	FW	BUL	Zhivko Petkov (from (Israel) Kafr Qasim)
—	FW	BUL	Todor Chavorski (from Yantra Gabrovo)

Out:

No.	Pos.	Nation	Player
8	MF	BUL	Aleksandar Pramatarov (to Spartak Plovdiv)
17	MF	BUL	Hristomir Ivanov (to Sozopol)
21	MF	BUL	Atanas Krastev (released)
31	MF	FRA	Saidou Dembelé (to Sportist Svoge)

=== CSKA 1948 II ===
In:

No.	Pos.	Nation	Player

Out:

No.	Pos.	Nation	Player
13	MF	BUL	Georgi Mariyanov (to Spartak Varna)
42	DF	BUL	Borislav Vakadinov (to Spartak Varna)
44	DF	BUL	Angel Granchov (to Spartak Varna)
48	DF	BUL	Preslav Petrov (to Spartak Varna)
51	DF	BUL	Boris Ivanov (to Dobrudzha)
59	DF	BUL	Nikola Borisov (to Montana)

=== Dobrudzha ===
In:

No.	Pos.	Nation	Player
1	GK	BUL	Georgi Argilashki (from Botev Plovdiv)
3	DF	BUL	Dimitar Pirgov (from Krumovgrad)
4	DF	BUL	Boris Ivanov (from CSKA 1948 II)
8	MF	BUL	Milen Gamakov (from Sozopol)
9	FW	BUL	Preslav Yordanov (from Pirin Blagoevgrad)
10	MF	BUL	Slavcho Shokolarov (from Pirin Blagoevgrad)
12	MF	BUL	Emanuil Manev (from Sozopol)
13	DF	BUL	Kristian Varbanov (from Chernolomets)
14	DF	BUL	Stilyan Nikolov (from Montana)
87	FW	BUL	Stefan Traikov (from Slavia sofia II)

Out:

No.	Pos.	Nation	Player
1	GK	BUL	Hristiyan Hristov (to Fratria)
7	FW	BUL	Bozhidar Chukanov (released)
9	FW	BUL	Denislav Angelov (end of contract)
10	MF	BUL	Ivailo Lazarov (released)
67	DF	BUL	Ahmed Ademov (to CSKA 1948)
68	DF	BUL	Ibryam Ibryam (to Fratria)
—	FW	BUL	Andrian Dimitrov (loan return to Spartak Varna)
—	FW	AUS	Bul Juach (released)

=== Dunav ===
In:

No.	Pos.	Nation	Player
4	DF	BUL	Georgi Ivanov (from Maritsa)
7	FW	BUL	Simeon Veshev (from Maritsa)
27	FW	BUL	Ivan Kolev (from (Malta) Sirens)
34	MF	BUL	Oleg Dimitrov (from Etar)

Out:

No.	Pos.	Nation	Player
1	GK	BUL	Tsvetelin Enchev (to Chernolomets)
8	MF	BUL	Emil Yanchev (to Montana)
10	MF	BUL	Mehmed Sabri (to Spartak Varna)
17	MF	FRA	Hugo Komano (to Pirin Blagoevgrad)
19	DF	BUL	Nikola Borisov (loan return from Spartak Varna)
77	DF	BUL	Martin Kostadinov (to Fratria)

=== Litex Lovech ===
In:

No.	Pos.	Nation	Player
—	GK	BUL	Aleks Bozhev (on loan from CSKA Sofia)
—	DF	BUL	Vasil Vasilev (from Gigant Saedinenie)
—	FW	BUL	Pavel Zhabov (on loan from CSKA Sofia)

Out:

No.	Pos.	Nation	Player
1	GK	BUL	Michael Matev (to Rilski Sportist)
24	GK	BUL	Marin Orlinov (to CSKA Sofia)

=== Ludogorets II ===
In:

No.	Pos.	Nation	Player

Out:

No.	Pos.	Nation	Player
38	FW	BUL	Vladislav Naydenov (on loan to Etar)
67	GK	BUL	Damyan Hristov (on loan to Etar)
76	DF	BUL	Valentin Tsvetanov (to Yantra Gabrovo)
79	DF	BUL	Tihomir Dimitrov (to Sportist Svoge)

=== Marek ===
In:

No.	Pos.	Nation	Player
—	FW	BUL	Andon Gushterov (from Chavdar Etropole)

Out:

No.	Pos.	Nation	Player

=== Maritsa ===
In:

No.	Pos.	Nation	Player
—	DF	BUL	Atanas Tasholov (from Krumovgrad)
—	DF	BUL	Miroslav Pushkarov (from Sportist Svoge)

Out:

No.	Pos.	Nation	Player
7	FW	BUL	Simeon Veshev (to Dunav Ruse)
11	MF	BUL	Iliyan Yordanov (released)
20	DF	BUL	Yordan Peychinov (to Spartak Plovdiv)
22	DF	BUL	Georgi Ivanov (to Dunav Ruse)
23	DF	BUL	Douglas Ivanof (released)
77	MF	BUL	Aykut Yanukov (released)

=== Montana ===
In:

No.	Pos.	Nation	Player
2	DF	BUL	Bogdan Kostov (from Sportist Svoge)
4	DF	BUL	Nikola Borisov (from CSKA 1948 II)
5	DF	BUL	Denis Dinev (from Levski Sofia)
6	MF	CMR	Franck Ellé Essouma (from Spartak Pleven)
17	DF	BUL	Simeon Chatov (from Sportist Svoge)
20	FW	FRA	Kevin Bemanga (from (France) Angers II)
24	DF	BUL	Aleksandar Todorov (from Septemvri Sofia)
30	GK	BUL	Vasil Simeonov (from Arda)
—	MF	BUL	Emil Yanchev (from Dunav Ruse)

Out:

No.	Pos.	Nation	Player
3	DF	BUL	Ivan Mihov (released)
4	DF	BUL	Martin Sandov (released)
7	DF	BUL	Andreas Vasev (end of contract)
9	FW	ALG	Mehdi Ouamri (released)
10	MF	BUL	Vladimir Aytov (end of contract)
12	GK	BUL	Petar L. Petrov (end of contract)
13	MF	BUL	Yordan Yordanov (to Septemvri Sofia)
17	MF	BEL	Foudil Idriss (released)
20	DF	BUL	Stilyan Nikolov (to Dobrudzha)
30	GK	BUL	Dimitar Iliev (released)
71	MF	BUL	Anton Karachanakov (released)
99	FW	SUI	Raël Lolala (released)

=== Septemvri Sofia ===
In:

No.	Pos.	Nation	Player
—	DF	BUL	Georgi Dinkov (from Beroe)
—	MF	BUL	Yordan Yordanov (from Montana)
—	MF	BUL	Hristo Ivanov (from Lokomotiv Plovdiv)
—	MF	BUL	Zdravko Dimitrov (on loan from Levski Sofia)
—	FW	BUL	Georgio Dimitrov (from Chernomorets Balchik)

Out:

No.	Pos.	Nation	Player
3	FW	BUL	Martin Petkov (end of contract)
6	MF	BUL	Atanas Kabov (to Hebar)
7	MF	BUL	Aykut Ramadan (end of contract)
8	DF	BUL	Aleksandar Todorov (end of contract)
9	FW	BUL	Valentin Yoskov (loan return to CSKA 1948)
11	DF	BUL	Martin Achkov (end of contract)
13	DF	BUL	Martin Nikolov (to Etar)
15	FW	MKD	Vlatko Stojanovski (released)
16	MF	BUL	Kristiyan Peshov (to Lokomotiv Plovdiv)
17	MF	BUL	Simeon Aleksandrov (loan return to CSKA Sofia)
18	MF	CRO	Petar Čuić (released)
20	DF	BUL	Krasimir Stanoev (released)
24	DF	MNE	Stefan Milić (loan return to Dinamo Zagreb)
25	MF	GER	Sebastian Jakubiak (end of contract)
26	DF	MKD	Konstantin Cheshmedjiev (released])
—	MF	BUL	Viktor Zorov (released)

=== Spartak Pleven ===
In:

No.	Pos.	Nation	Player

Out:

No.	Pos.	Nation	Player
3	MF	CMR	Franck Ellé Essouma (to Montana)
7	FW	BUL	Georgi Georgiev (to Litex)
8	MF	BRA	Klauber (released)
15	FW	BUL	Stiviyan Makaveev (to Sevlievo)
17	DF	BUL	Aleks Georgiev (to Sevlievo)
20	FW	BUL	Filip Kolev (released)
23	DF	BUL	Lachezar Kovachev (to Sevlievo)
25	MF	BUL	Ivan Trenchev (released)

=== Spartak Varna ===
In:

No.	Pos.	Nation	Player
—	GK	BUL	Nikola Videnov (from Minyor Pernik)
—	GK	BUL	Georgi Georgiev (from Cherno More)
—	DF	BUL	Nikola Borisov (loan return from Dunav Ruse)
—	DF	BUL	Preslav Petrov (from CSKA 1948 II)
—	DF	BUL	Borislav Vakadinov (from CSKA 1948 II)
—	DF	BUL	Miroslav Georgiev (from Botev Plovdiv II)
—	DF	BUL	Angel Granchov (from CSKA 1948 II)
—	DF	BUL	Atanas Zehirov (from Arda)
—	MF	BUL	Hristofor Hubchev (from Pirin Blagoevgrad)
—	MF	BUL	Georgi Mariyanov (from CSKA 1948 II)
—	MF	BUL	Evgeni Iliev (from Etar)
—	MF	BUL	Hidayet Hyusein (from Nesebar)
—	MF	BUL	Mehmed Sabri (from Dunav Ruse)
—	MF	BUL	Yoan Baurenski (from Beroe)
—	FW	BUL	Ahmed Ahmedov (from Slavia Sofia)
—	FW	BUL	Andrian Dimitrov (loan return from Dobrudzha)

Out:

No.	Pos.	Nation	Player
3	DF	CIV	Benjamin Karamoko (released)
6	DF	BRA	Luan (loan return to Lokomotiv Plovdiv)
7	FW	GER	Leroy-Jacques Mickels (released)
8	MF	BUL	Ivaylo Klimentov (released)
12	FW	BRA	Ewandro (loan return to Lokomotiv Plovdiv)
17	DF	MDA	Alexandr Belousov (released)
19	DF	BUL	Nikola Borisov (to Fratria, previously on loan to Dunav Ruse)
20	MF	CUW	Nathan Holder (loan return to Levski Sofia)
21	GK	BUL	Ivan Dichevski (released)
22	MF	ESP	Rober Sierra (released)
23	FW	GNB	João Mário (released)
24	FW	CUW	Liandro Martis (released)
25	DF	BUL	Plamen Dimov (released)
27	FW	UKR	Denys Balanyuk (released)
31	GK	POR	Cristiano (released)
47	FW	NED	Rodney Antwi (released)
82	MF	BUL	Ivan Yordanov (loan return to Ludogorets)

=== Sportist Svoge ===
In:

No.	Pos.	Nation	Player
—	GK	BUL	Ivan Goshev (from Beroe)
—	DF	BUL	Martin Sandov (from Montana)
—	DF	BUL	Georgi Madzharov (from Chavdar Etropole)
—	DF	BUL	Tihomir Dimitrov (from Ludogorets Razgrad II)
—	MF	BUL	Anton Ivanov (from Levski Sofia II)
—	MF	BUL	Kaloyan Stefanov (from Krumovgrad)
—	MF	FRA	Saidou Dembelé (from Chernomorets Burgas)
—	FW	BUL	Kaloyan Yosifov (from Minyor Pernik)
—	FW	BUL	Radoslav Zhivkov (from CSKA Sofia)

Out:

No.	Pos.	Nation	Player
1	GK	BUL	Martin Velichkov (released)
3	MF	BUL	Petar Vutsov (to Yantra Gabrovo)
4	DF	BUL	Miroslav Pushkarov (to Maritsa)
6	DF	BUL	Dilyan Georgiev (to (Kosovo) Drita)
11	MF	BUL	Filip Angelov (to Chernomorets Burgas)
15	FW	BUL	Georgi Nikolov (to Hebar)
16	DF	BUL	Bogdan Kostov (to Montana)
23	DF	BUL	Simeon Chatov (to Montana)

=== Strumska Slava ===
In:

No.	Pos.	Nation	Player
7	MF	BUL	Antonio Laskov (from Sozopol)
91	DF	BUL	Rafail Parlikov (from Vihren Sandanski)

Out:

No.	Pos.	Nation	Player

=== Yantra ===
In:

No.	Pos.	Nation	Player
2	DF	BUL	Valentin Tsvetanov (from Ludogorets Razgrad II)
5	DF	BUL	Tsvetelin Radev (from Krumovgrad)
11	FW	BUL	Daniel Mladenov (from Etar)
12	GK	BUL	Boris Gruev (from Vitosha Bistritsa)
99	MF	BUL	Petar Vutsov (from Sportist Svoge)

Out:

No.	Pos.	Nation	Player
17	FW	BUL	Todor Chavorski (released)
27	DF	BUL	Georgi Varbanov (to Pirin Blagoevgrad)
