= Yevgeny Ignatov =

Yevgeny (or Evgeni) Ignatov (Russian: Евгений Игнатов) may refer to several people:

- Yevgeny Petrovich Ignatov, Hero of the Soviet Union
- Yevgeny Ignatov (canoeist), Russian sprint canoeist
- Yevgeny Ignatov (runner), retired long-distance runner from Bulgaria
- Evgeni Ignatov (footballer), Bulgarian footballer
