= Arlind =

- Gender: male

Origin
- Origin: Albanian
- Meaning: ar ("gold") + lind ("to be born")
- Region of origin: Albania

Other names
- Variant form: feminine: Arlinda

Arlind is a masculine Albanian given name.

Notable people with the name include:

- Arlind Ajeti (born 1993), footballer
- Arlind Dakaj (born 2001), footballer
- Arlind Ferhati (born 1994), footballer
- Arlind Kalaja (born 1995), footballer
- Arlind Kurti (born 2005), footballer
- Arlind Nora (born 1980), footballer
- Arlind Pirani (born 1990), footballer
- Arlind Qori (born 1981), politician
- Arlind Rustemi (born 1986), footballer
- Arlind Sadiku (born 1989), football commentator
- Arlind Sejdiu (born 2001), footballer
