= Georgi Ivanov (footballer, born 1967) =

Bulgarian footballer and coach

Personal information
- Full name: Georgi Nikolov Ivanov
- Date of birth: 22 May 1967 (age 59)
- Place of birth: Gorna Oryahovitsa, Bulgaria
- Height: 1.77 m (5 ft 9 1/2 in)
- Positions: Defender; midfielder

Team information
- Current team: Septemvri Tervel (manager)

Senior career*
Years	Team	Apps	(Gls)
1987–1988	Chernolomets Popovo		
1989–1990	Cherno More	13	(1)
1990–1991	Ludogorets	–	(–)
1991–1993	Dobrudzha Dobrich	–	(–)
1993–1996	Levski Sofia	64	(3)
1996–1999	Slavia Sofia	72	(3)
1999–2000	Spartak Varna	26	(1)
2000–2002	Spartak Pleven	–	(–)

Managerial career
- 2002: Spartak Pleven (assistant)
- 2004–2005: Belasitsa Petrich (assistant)
- 2005: Belasitsa Petrich
- 2005–2006: Dorostol Silistra
- 2006–2007: Devnya
- 2007: Spartak Varna
- 2007: Volov Shumen
- 2008: Nesebar
- 2009–2011: Dorostol Silistra
- 2012–2013: Svetkavitsa
- 2013: Spartak Varna
- 2014–2020: Chernomorets Balchik
- 2020–2021: Lokomotiv Gorna Oryahovitsa
- 2021–2022: Spartak Varna (assistant)
- 2022: Spartak Varna (interim)
- 2024–: Septemvri Tervel
- * Club domestic league appearances and goals

Georgi "Gesha" Ivanov (Bulgarian: Георги Иванов - Геша; born 22 May 1967) is a Bulgarian former footballer and coach, who currently leads Septemvri Tervel.

== Honours ==
=== Player ===
Levski Sofia

- A Group (2): 1993–94, 1994–95
- Bulgarian Cup (1): 1993–94
