= Vladislav Mirchev =

Bulgarian footballer

Personal information
- Full name: Vladislav Mitkov Mirchev
- Date of birth: 23 January 1987 (age 39)
- Place of birth: Varna, Bulgaria
- Height: 1.83 m (6 ft 0 in)
- Position: Forward

Team information
- Current team: Septemvri Tervel

Youth career
- Spartak Varna

Senior career*
Years	Team	Apps	(Gls)
2004–2009	Spartak Varna		
2006–2007	→ Chernomorets Burgas (loan)		
2008	→ BATE Borisov (loan)	10	(1)
2009–2010	Ancona	11	(0)
2011	Oostende	11	(2)
2012	Bdin Vidin	10	(9)
2012	Irtysh Pavlodar	4	(0)
2013	Lokomotiv Plovdiv	15	(2)
2014	ENAD Polis Chrysochous	15	(2)
2015	Septemvri Tervel		
2015	Club Valencia		
2016	Spartak Varna		
2016	Nesebar	14	(3)
2017	Perak TBG	12	(3)
2017–2020	Chernomorets Balchik	56	(20)
2020–2021	Lokomotiv GO	29	(10)
2021–2022	Spartak Varna	8	(1)
2022	Ustrem Donchevo		
2022–	Septemvri Tervel		

International career
2007–2008	Bulgaria U21		
- * Club domestic league appearances and goals as of 29 March 2022

Vladislav Mirchev (Bulgarian: Владислав Мирчев; born 23 January 1987) is a Bulgarian footballer who plays for Septemvri Tervel as a forward.

== Career ==
Born in Varna, Mirchev was a product of the Spartak Varna system. In June 2004, he was moved from the youth squad to the first team. Mirchev made his debut during the 2004–05 season in A PFG, on 13 August 2004 against PFC Rodopa Smolyan. The club was relegated to B PFG at the end of the season. He scored his first goal for Spartak in their 2–0 victory over Maritsa Plovdiv on 10 September 2005. Mirchev helped the club to promotion to A PFG in 2006.

In May 2006 Mirchev eventually signed a one-year loan deal with Chernomorets Burgas, making his debut in an away draw against Dunav Ruse on 30 September 2006.

One-a-half-year later Mirchev was loaned to the Belarusian side BATE Borisov for four months. With BATE he played in the UEFA Champions League 2008-09 group stage. On 9 September 2008 Mirchev scored a hat-trick for BATE in a match of the Belarusian Cup against Neman Most. He scored goals in the 38th, 40th and 74th minute. The result of the match was a 7–3 win for BATE. On 14 September Mirchev scored his first league goal for the club against Naftan Novopolotsk. A few days later Mirchev made his Champions League debut against Real Madrid at the Santiago Bernabéu Stadium. Before he returned to Spartak he became a champion of Belarus in November 2008.

He signed for Italian team A.C. Ancona in August 2009, for two-year contract.

After impressing with FC Bdin, Mirchev signed a contract with Irtysh Pavlodar in the summer of 2012.

Mirchev's nomadic career has taken him to 9 clubs in 6 years. He has played in Bulgaria, Kazakhstan, Cyprus, Maldives and finally; Malaysia.

In December 2016, Mirchev joined Malaysian club Perak The Bos Gaurus, signing a two-year contract.

== International career ==
In 2007 Mirchev played in Bulgaria national under-21 football team.

Vladislav Mirchev: International Goals
#	Date	Venue	Opponent	Score	Result	Competition
1.	8 February 2007	Athens, Greece	Greece U21	0–2	1–4	Friendly

== Honours ==
=== Club ===
Spartak Varna

- B Group: 2005–06

Chernomorets Burgas

- B Group: 2006–07

BATE Borisov

- Belarusian Premier League: 2008

Irtysh Pavlodar

- Kazakhstan Premier League runner-up: 2012
- Kazakhstan Cup runner-up: 2012

Spartak Varna

- A Regional Group: 2015–16

=== Individual ===
- B Group top goalscorer: 2011–12
- A Regional Group top goalscorer: 2015–16
