= Valeri Hristov =

Bulgarian footballer

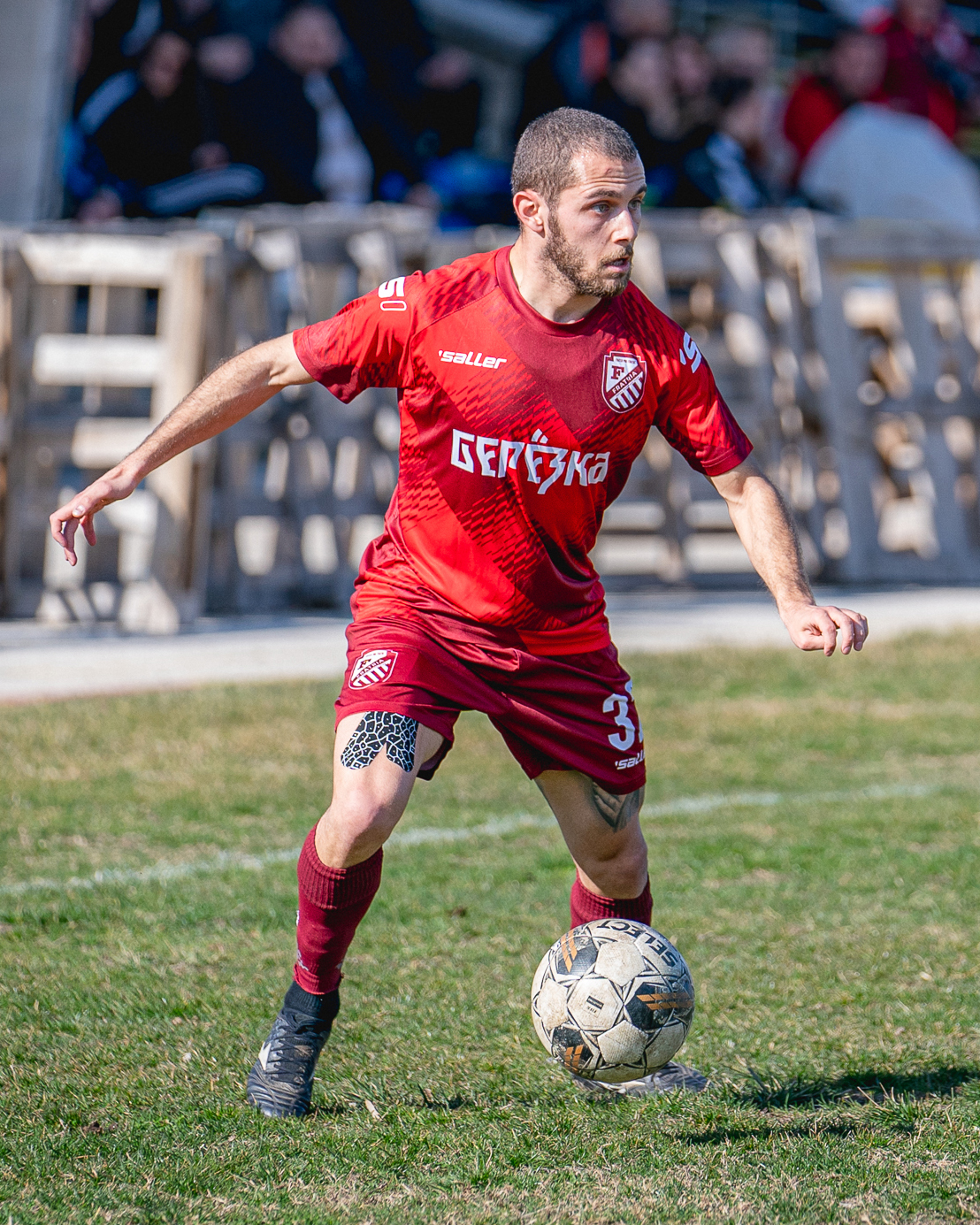
- Hristov playing for Fratria in 2024.

Personal information
- Full name: Valeri Hristov Hristov
- Date of birth: 10 March 1998 (age 28)
- Place of birth: Dobrich, Bulgaria
- Height: 1.69 m (5 ft 6 1/2 in)
- Positions: Right-back; midfielder

Team information
- Current team: Grand Pro Varna (youth coach)

Youth career
- 2007–2015: Cherno More
- 2015–2016: Litex Lovech

Senior career*
| Years | Team | Apps | (Gls) |
| 2015–2016 | Litex Lovech II | 6 | (1) |
| 2016 | Lokomotiv Plovdiv | 0 | (0) |
| 2017–2019 | Chernomorets Balchik | 38 | (1) |
| 2019–2021 | Montana | 27 | (0) |
| 2021–2022 | Botev Vratsa | 22 | (0) |
| 2022 | Yantra Gabrovo | 16 | (1) |
| 2023 | Etar Veliko Tarnovo | 27 | (0) |
| 2024 | Fratria | 5 | (0) |
| 2024 | Septemvri Tervel | 6 | (0) |
| Total | | 147 | (3) |

International career
| 2013 | Bulgaria U16 | 1 | (0) |
| 2014 | Bulgaria U17 | 3 | (0) |
| 2015–2017 | Bulgaria U19 | 3 | (0) |

Managerial career
- 2025–: Grand Pro Varna (youth coach)
- * Club domestic league appearances and goals as of 12:52, 3 December 2024 (UTC)

Valeri Hristov (Bulgarian: Валери Христов; born 10 March 1998) is a Bulgarian retired professional footballer who played as a defender and now youth manager. He retired from play at the age of 27 to pursue a coaching career.

== Career ==
In November 2022, Etar Veliko Tarnovo announced they signed Hristov, coming from Yantra Gabrovo and joining his new team on 1 January 2023. On 2 January 2024, Hristov signed with the ambitious team of Fratria, playing in Third League.
