= Franck Ellé Essouma =

Cameroonian footballer (born 2000)

Franck Ellé
Personal information
- Full name: Franck-Landry Ellé Essouma
- Date of birth: 16 June 2000 (age 26)
- Place of birth: Yaoundé, Cameroon
- Height: 1.81 m (5 ft 11 in)
- Position: Defensive midfielder

Team information
- Current team: Al-Shabab

Senior career*
Years	Team	Apps	(Gls)
2017–2019	Troyes B	2	(1)
2019–2020	Le Havre B	5	(0)
2020–2021	Paris FC	1	(0)
2020–2021	Paris FC B	1	(0)
2021–2023	Apollon Kalamarias	29	(3)
2023	Spartak Pleven	10	(0)
2023–2024	Montana	28	(2)
2024	Septemvri Sofia	9	(0)
2025	KTP	15	(0)
2025–2026	Chernomorets 1919	9	(0)
2026–	Al-Shabab	0	(0)
- * Club domestic league appearances and goals as of 11 March 2026

Franck Ellé (born 16 June 2000) is a Cameroonian professional footballer who plays as a defensive midfielder for Kuwait Premier League club Al-Shabab. Previously he has played in France, Greece, Bulgaria and Finland.

== Club career ==
On 18 December 2024, Ellé moved to Finland and signed with newly promoted Veikkausliiga club Kotkan Työväen Palloilijat (KTP) on a 1+1-year deal.

== Personal life ==
Ellé Essouma has a dual citizenship of Cameroon and France.

== Career statistics ==
As of 21 August 2025

Appearances and goals by club, season and competition
Club	Season	League			National cup		Other		Total	
Club	Season	Division	Apps	Goals	Apps	Goals	Apps	Goals	Apps	Goals
Troyes B	2017–18	National 3	0	0	–		–		0	0
Troyes B	2018–19	National 3	2	1	–		–		2	1
Troyes B	Total		2	1	0	0	0	0	2	1
Le Havre B	2019–20	National 3	5	0	–		–		5	0
Paris FC	2020–21	Ligue 2	1	0	0	0	–		1	0
Paris FC B	2020–21	National 3	1	0	–		–		1	0
Apollon Kalamarias	2021–22	Super League Greece 2	25	3	0	0	–		25	3
Apollon Kalamarias	2022–23	Super League Greece 2	4	0	0	0	–		4	0
Apollon Kalamarias	Total		29	3	0	0	0	0	29	3
Spartak Pleven	2022–23	Bulgarian Second League	10	0	–		–		10	0
Montana	2023–24	Bulgarian Second League	28	2	–		–		28	2
Septemvri Sofia	2024–25	Bulgarian First League	9	0	–		–		9	0
KTP	2025	Veikkausliiga	15	0	2	0	2 (Note: Appearances in Finnish League Cup)	0	19	0
Career total			100	6	2	0	2	0	104	6
