= Ivan Dichevski =

Bulgarian footballer

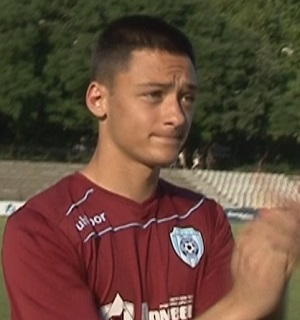

Personal information
- Full name: Ivan Marinov Dichevski
- Date of birth: 24 April 2001 (age 25)
- Place of birth: Varna, Bulgaria
- Height: 1.87 m (6 ft 1 1/2 in)
- Position: Goalkeeper

Youth career
- 2010–2019: Cherno More

Senior career*
Years	Team	Apps	(Gls)
2018–2021	Cherno More	4	(0)
2022–2023	Spartak Varna	29	(0)
2023	Arda Kardzhali	3	(0)

International career
2017	Bulgaria U17	2	(0)
2017–2018	Bulgaria U18	4	(0)
- * Club domestic league appearances and goals

Ivan Dichevski (Bulgarian: Иван Дичевски; born 24 April 2001) is a Bulgarian former professional footballer who played as a goalkeeper.

== Career ==
Dichevski made his league debut for Cherno More in a 4–1 away loss against Ludogorets Razgrad on 24 May 2019, playing the full 90 minutes.

In the end of 2021 it was announced that Dichevski would leave Cherno More. On 6 February he signed for the local rivals Spartak Varna.

In June 2023, he signed a contract with Arda Kardzhali.

== Career statistics ==
=== Club ===
As of 1 January 2024

Club performance			League		Cup		Continental		Total	
Club	League	Season	Apps	Goals	Apps	Goals	Apps	Goals	Apps	Goals
Bulgaria			League		Bulgarian Cup		Europe		Total	
Cherno More	First League	2017–18	0	0	0	0	–		0	0
Cherno More	First League	2018–19	1	0	0	0	–		1	0
Cherno More	First League	2019–20	1	0	0	0	–		1	0
Cherno More	First League	2020–21	2	0	0	0	–		2	0
Cherno More	Total		4	0	0	0	0	0	4	0
Spartak Varna	Second League	2021–22	9	0	0	0	–		9	0
Spartak Varna	First League	2022–23	20	0	1	0	–		21	0
Spartak Varna	Total		29	0	1	0	0	0	30	0
Arda Kardzhali	First League	2023–24	3	0	1	0	–		4	0
Career statistics			36	0	2	0	0	0	38	0
