= Abdoulaye Traoré (footballer, born 2003) =

Ivorian footballer (born 2003)

Personal information
- Full name: David Traoré Abdoulaye Kinski
- Date of birth: 28 June 2003 (age 23)
- Place of birth: San-Pédro, Ivory Coast
- Height: 1.76 m (5 ft 9 in)
- Position: Winger

Team information
- Current team: Al Shahaniya
- Number: 11

Youth career
- FDC Vista

Senior career*
Years	Team	Apps	(Gls)
2022–2023	Botev Plovdiv II	5	(9)
2022–2023	Botev Plovdiv	16	(2)
2023–2026	Zulte Waregem	50	(7)
2026–	Al Shahaniya	13	(7)

International career
2023–2025	Ivory Coast U23	4	(2)
- * Club domestic league appearances and goals as of 23:08, 20 September 2026 (UTC)

Abdoulaye Traoré (born David Traoré Abdoulaye Kinski 28 June 2003), known as Ablo Traoré, is an Ivorian professional footballer who plays as a winger for Al Shahaniya.

== Club career ==
=== Early years and Botev Plovdiv ===
Traoré came through FDC Vista, a football academy in Gelendzhik, southern Russia, owned by the businessman Anton Zingarevich, who also owned the Bulgarian club Botev Plovdiv. In autumn 2022, as Botev drew players from the academy, Traoré joined the Plovdiv club as a free agent; the club's executive director, German Chistyakov, said it had been tracking him and described him as a forward with significant potential. The move came at a time when the academy's Russian base had become problematic following Russia's suspension from international football, and the club's owner was reported to be considering relocating Vista to Dubai.

Traoré scored both goals in a 2–0 win for Botev Plovdiv II over Dobrudzha on his debut in the Second League, and his form for the reserves earned him a promotion to the first team.

=== Zulte Waregem ===
On 31 July 2023, Traoré moved to Zulte Waregem for an undisclosed fee, which Botev described as one of the three highest transfers in the club's history. He featured regularly in the Challenger Pro League during the 2023–24 season, scoring in wins including a 3–0 victory at Beveren in October 2023. In the 2024–25 season he was part of the Zulte Waregem squad that won the Challenger Pro League title and promotion to the Belgian Pro League. He made a small number of top-flight appearances early in the 2025–26 season before leaving in the winter transfer window.

=== Al Shahaniya ===
On 2 February 2026, Traoré joined Qatari club Al Shahaniya.

== International career ==
In November 2023, he received his first call-up for Ivory Coast U23, scoring a goal for the 4–0 win over Iraq U23.

== Career statistics ==
As of match played 8 May 2026

Appearances and goals by club, season and competition
Club	Season	League			National cup (Note: Includes Bulgarian Cup, Belgian Cup, Amir of Qatar Cup)		League cup (Note: Includes QSL Cup)		Continental		Other		Total	
Club	Season	Division	Apps	Goals	Apps	Goals	Apps	Goals	Apps	Goals	Apps	Goals	Apps	Goals
Botev Plovdiv II	2022–23	Second League	5	9	—		—		—		—		5	9
Botev Plovdiv	2022–23	First League	16	2	2	0	—		—		—		18	2
Zulte Waregem	2023–24	Challenger Pro League	30	4	3	2	—		—		1 (Note: Appearance in Belgian promotion/relegation play-offs)	0	34	6
Zulte Waregem	2024–25	Challenger Pro League	17	3	3	3	—		—		—		20	6
Zulte Waregem	2025–26	Challenger Pro League	3	0	0	0	—		—		—		3	0
Zulte Waregem	Total		50	7	6	5	—		—		1	0	57	12
Al Shahaniya	2025–26	Qatar Stars League	8	4	1	0	0	0	—		1 (Note: Appearance in Qatar Stars League relegation play-off)	1	10	5
Career total			79	22	9	5	0	0	0	0	2	1	90	28
