= Ivan Vasilev (footballer, born 2001) =

Bulgarian footballer

Personal information
- Full name: Ivan Kostadinov Vasilev
- Date of birth: 16 May 2001 (age 25)
- Place of birth: Plovdiv, Bulgaria
- Height: 1.87 m (6 ft 2 in)
- Position: Forward

Team information
- Current team: Cassano Sybaris
- Number: 9

Youth career
- Botev Plovdiv

Senior career*
Years	Team	Apps	(Gls)
2018–2022	Botev Plovdiv	18	(1)
2021	→ Fremad Amager (loan)	8	(1)
2021–2022	Botev Plovdiv II	32	(10)
2022–2024	Yantra Gabrovo	48	(12)
2024	Etar	15	(4)
2024–2025	Botev Vratsa	8	(0)
2025	Krumovgrad	0	(0)
2025–2026	Yantra Gabrovo	14	(0)
2026	Lokomotiv GO	5	(0)
2026	Saham Club	0	(0)
2026–	Cassano Sybaris		

International career
2017	Bulgaria U17	5	(0)
- * Club domestic league appearances and goals as of 7 October 2026

Ivan Vasilev (Bulgarian: Иван Василев; born 16 May 2001) is a Bulgarian footballer who plays as a forward for Italian club Cassano Sybaris.
