= Martin Valchinov =

Bulgarian footballer

Personal information
- Full name: Martin Yavorov Valchinov
- Date of birth: 26 November 1999 (age 26)
- Place of birth: Sofia, Bulgaria
- Position: Winger

Team information
- Current team: Rilski Sportist
- Number: 11

Youth career
- –2014: Lokomotiv Sofia
- 2014–2016: Levski Sofia
- 2016–2017: Lokomotiv Sofia
- 2017–2018: Septemvri Sofia

Senior career*
Years	Team	Apps	(Gls)
2016–2017	Lokomotiv Sofia	3	(0)
2017–2018	Septemvri Sofia	1	(0)
2019	Balkan Botevgrad	11	(4)
2019–2022	Hebar	48	(0)
2022–2023	Litex	2	(0)
2023	Kostinbrod	14	(1)
2023–	Rilski Sportist	13	(0)

International career
2020	Bulgaria U21	1	(0)
- * Club domestic league appearances and goals as of 22 September 2022

Martin Valchinov (Bulgarian: Мартин Вълчинов; born 10 November 1999) is a Bulgarian footballer who plays as a winger for Rilski Sportist. He is a son of the Bulgarian retired footballer and now manager Yavor Valchinov.

== Career ==
=== Lokomotiv Sofia ===
In the end of 2016 Valchinov moved from Levski Sofia youths to Lokomotiv Sofia main team. He made his debut for the team on 14 April 2017 in a league match against Botev Galabovo.

=== Septemvri Sofia ===
In the summer of 2017 he moved to Septemvri Sofia. Martin completed his professional debut for the club in a league match against Lokomotiv Plovdiv.

=== Litex Lovech ===
In June 2022, Valchinov joined Litex.

== Honours ==
=== Club ===
Balkan Botevgrad

- Cup of Bulgarian Amateur Football League: 2019

== Career statistics ==
=== Club ===
As of 25 April 2018

Club performance			League		Cup		Continental		Other		Total	
Club	League	Season	Apps	Goals	Apps	Goals	Apps	Goals	Apps	Goals	Apps	Goals
Bulgaria			League		Bulgarian Cup		Europe		Other		Total	
Lokomotiv Sofia	Second League	2016–17	3	0	0	0	–		–		3	0
Lokomotiv Sofia	Total		3	0	0	0	0	0	0	0	3	0
Septemvri Sofia	First League	2017–18	1	0	0	0	–		–		1	0
Septemvri Sofia	Total		1	0	0	0	0	0	0	0	1	0
Career statistics			4	0	0	0	0	0	0	0	4	0
