= Genadi Lugo =

Bulgarian footballer (born 1989)

Personal information
- Full name: Genadi Juan Alberto Lugo
- Date of birth: 6 May 1989 (age 37)
- Place of birth: Varna, Bulgaria
- Height: 1.77 m (5 ft 10 in)
- Position: Defender

Team information
- Current team: Septemvri Tervel
- Number: 30

Youth career
- Spartak Varna

Senior career*
Years	Team	Apps	(Gls)
2007	Spartak Varna	1	(0)
2008	Minyor Radnevo	4	(0)
2008–2009	Suvorovo	34	(1)
2010–2011	Spartak Varna	38	(3)
2013–2014	SV Neubäu	16	(0)
2014–2020	Chernomorets Balchik	159	(8)
2021–2023	Spartak Varna	47	(2)
2023–	Septemvri Tervel		
- * Club domestic league appearances and goals as of 12:56, 6 March 2023 (UTC)

Genadi Juan Alberto Lugo (Bulgarian: Генади Хуан Албертo Луго; born 6 May 1989) is a Bulgarian footballer who plays as a defender for Septemvri Tervel.

== Personal life ==
Lugo is of Cuban descent.
