= Lucas Willian =

Brazilian footballer

Personal information
- Full name: Lucas Willian Cruzeiro Martins
- Date of birth: 12 May 1995 (age 31)
- Place of birth: Rio de Janeiro, Brazil
- Height: 1.77 m (5 ft 10 in)
- Position: Winger

Team information
- Current team: Sportist Svoge

Youth career
- 2011–2016: Tigres do Brasil

Senior career*
Years	Team	Apps	(Gls)
2015–2016	Tigres do Brasil	12	(1)
2016–2018	Rio Branco		
2018–2020	Arda Kardzhali	27	(1)
2021	Gimhae FC	9	(2)
2022	Tsarsko Selo	10	(2)
2022–2023	Beroe	12	(0)
2023–	Sportist Svoge	0	(0)
- * Club domestic league appearances and goals as of 13 January 2023

Lucas Willian Cruzeiro Martins (born 12 May 1995), known as just Lucas Willian, is a Brazilian footballer who plays as a winger for Sportist Svoge.
