= Mehmed Sabri =

Bulgarian footballer

Personal information
- Full name: Mehmed Sabri Mehmed
- Date of birth: 12 September 1998 (age 28)
- Place of birth: Razgrad, Bulgaria
- Height: 1.73 m (5 ft 8 in)
- Positions: Forward; winger

Team information
- Current team: Chernolomets Popovo
- Number: 15

Youth career
- 2009–2018: Ludogorets Razgrad

Senior career*
Years	Team	Apps	(Gls)
2017–2018	Ludogorets Razgrad II	9	(1)
2018–2019	Hitrino	2	(2)
2019–2020	TSV Wacker 50		
2020–2021	Chernolomets Popovo	12	(3)
2021–2022	Spartak Varna	41	(7)
2023	Dunav Ruse	14	(2)
2023–2024	Spartak Varna	31	(0)
2024–	Chernolomets Popovo	2	(1)
- * Club domestic league appearances and goals as of 11:57, 11 September 2024 (UTC)

Mehmed Sabri (Bulgarian: Мехмед Сабри; born 12 September 1998) is a Bulgarian professional footballer who plays as a forward or winger for Chernolomets Popovo.

== Career ==
Sabri began his career in the local Ludogorets Razgrad in 2009. He played for Ludogorets Razgrad II, before moving to Hitrino, Wacker 50 and Chernolomets 04. In 2021 he joined Spartak Varna, which whom he won a promote to First League. He debuted in the top league of Bulgaria on 11 July 2022, in the first match of the season against Slavia Sofia.

== Personal life ==
In 2019 Mehmed married his long-term girlfriend Samara, which is the sister of the wife of his ex-teammate Marcelinho.
