= Dimitar Stoyanov (footballer) =

Bulgarian footballer

Personal information
- Full name: Dimitar Kirilov Stoyanov
- Date of birth: 14 April 2001 (age 25)
- Place of birth: Sofia, Bulgaria
- Height: 1.80 m (5 ft 11 in)
- Positions: Midfielder; right back

Team information
- Current team: Strumska Slava

Youth career
- Slavia Sofia

Senior career*
Years	Team	Apps	(Gls)
2019–2023	Slavia Sofia	24	(0)
2022	→ Beroe (loan)	12	(0)
2023–	Strumska Slava	35	(2)

International career
2019–2020	Bulgaria U19	5	(0)
2021–	Bulgaria U21	2	(1)
- * Club domestic league appearances and goals as of 5 January 2024

Dimitar Stoyanov (Bulgarian: Димитър Стоянов; born 14 April 2001) is a Bulgarian professional footballer who plays as a midfielder for Strumska Slava.
