= FC Septemvri Tervel =

Bulgarian football club

Septemvri Tervel
- Full name: Football Club Septemvri 98 Tervel
- Nickname: The Khans
- Founded: 1998; 28 years ago
- Ground: Stadion Septemvri
- Capacity: 700
- Manager: Georgi Ivanov
- League: North-East Third League
- 2024–25: North-East Third League, 1st
- Website: https://septemvri98.com/
Home colours	Away colours

Septemvri Tervel is a Bulgarian football club from the town of Tervel.

It plays its home matches at Septemvri stadium with a capacity of 700 seats, and its team colours are orange and white. The team currently plays in the Bulgarian North-East Third League. Septemvri Stadium was renovated in 2009 and now it holds 700 spectators.

== History ==
Septemvri was founded in 1998. It played in Regional league until 2008, when it promoted to North-East Third League. In December 2023, Georgi Ivanov was announced as the new team manager in a bid to win promotion to the Second League. The team secured the Third League title on 11 May 2025 and won a promotion to Second League for first time in their history. Few days later, the team announced that they wont promote due to financial reasons and would retain their team in Third League.

== Honours ==
- North-East Third League:
  - Winners (1): 2024–25
- A RFG Dobrich:
  - Winners (1): 2007–08

== Current squad ==
As of 8 September 2026 Note: Flags indicate national team as defined under FIFA eligibility rules; some limited exceptions apply. Players may hold more than one non-FIFA nationality.

No.	Pos.	Nation	Player
1	GK	BUL	Hristian Savov
3	DF	BUL	Yanislav Dimitrov
6	DF	BUL	Genadi Lugo
7	FW	BUL	Kristiyan Peshkov
8	MF	BUL	Ivaylo Lazarov
9	FW	BUL	Ivelin Vasilev
11	MF	BUL	Dimitar Vasilev
13	DF	BUL	Taner Yusnyu
14	MF	BUL	Petar Dimitrov
16	DF	BUL	Danail Dimov

No.	Pos.	Nation	Player
17	MF	BUL	Encho Nikolov
19	MF	BUL	Dimitar Kovachev
20	MF	BUL	Nikolay Ivanov
22	DF	BUL	Stefan Stoyanov
25	GK	BUL	Erik Georgiev
29	MF	BUL	Denis Kadir
30	MF	BUL	Valentin Tsvetanov
75	MF	BUL	Petar Georgiev
77	MF	BUL	Kalin Georgiev

== Seasons ==
=== Past seasons ===
Results of league and cup competitions by season
Season	League											Bulgarian Cup	Other competitions		Top goalscorer	
Season	Division	Level	P	W	D	L	F	A	GD	Pts	Pos	Bulgarian Cup	Other competitions		Top goalscorer	
2008–09	Third League	3	36	18	4	14	52	47	+5	58	8th	DNQ				
2009–10	Third League	3	34	17	8	9	47	30	+17	59	3rd	DNQ				
2010–11	Third League	3	30	20	2	8	54	27	+27	62	2nd	DNQ				
2011–12	Third League	3	28	13	10	5	45	27	+18	49	5th	DNQ				
2012–13	Third League	3	28	12	6	10	39	33	+6	42	6th	DNQ				
2013–14	Third League	3	30	22	2	6	77	20	+57	68	3rd	DNQ				
2014–15	Third League	3	30	15	1	14	43	46	-3	46	7th	DNQ				
2015–16	Third League	3	26	9	4	13	42	39	+3	31	10th	DNQ	Cup of AFL	R3		
2016–17	Third League	3	28	8	8	12	26	38	-12	32	7th	DNQ	Cup of AFL	R1		
2017–18	Third League	3	30	14	4	12	48	49	-1	46	5th	DNQ	Cup of AFL	R3		
2018–19	Third League	3	29	15	5	9	52	39	+13	50	5th	DNQ	Cup of AFL	R1		
2019–20	Third League	3	15	7	4	4	23	12	+11	25	5th	DNQ	Cup of AFL	R3		
2020–21	Third League	3	28	18	4	6	58	23	+35	58	3rd	DNQ	Cup of AFL	R1		
2021–22	Third League	3	26	14	9	3	49	15	+34	51	5th	Round of 32	Cup of AFL	R1		
2022–23	Third League	3	28	21	2	1	86	13	+73	68	2nd	DNQ	Cup of AFL	R3	(Bulgaria) Vladislav Mirchev	14
2023–24	Third League	3	26	18	4	4	52	19	+33	58	3rd	Round of 32	Cup of AFL	R2	(Bulgaria) Rumen Nikolov	10
2024–25	Third League	3									1st	Preliminary round	Cup of AFL	R3	(Bulgaria) Vladislav Mirchev	13

==== Key ====
- GS = Group stage
- QF = Quarter-finals
- SF = Semi-finals

Champions	Runners-up	Promoted	Relegated
