= Arlind Dakaj =

Swiss footballer (born 2001)

Personal information
- Date of birth: 13 October 2001 (age 25)
- Place of birth: Muri, Switzerland
- Height: 1.77 m (5 ft 10 in)
- Position: Midfielder

Youth career
- –2017: Zürich
- 2020–2021: Winterthur

Senior career*
Years	Team	Apps	(Gls)
2021–2023	Winterthur	11	(0)
2023	Cherno More	20	(0)
2024	Erzeni	12	(0)
2024–2025	CSM Focșani	11	(1)
- * Club domestic league appearances and goals as of 14 December 2024

Arlind Dakaj (born 13 October 2001) is a Swiss professional footballer who plays as a midfielder.

== Career ==
Dakaj graduated from FC Zürich's youth academy. In 2020 he joined Winterthur, making his first-team debut for the club aged 19 on 23 July 2021 in a game against Stade Lausanne Ouchy.

On 19 January 2023, Dakaj signed a contract with Cherno More Varna in Bulgaria.

== Honours ==
Winterthur

- Swiss Challenge League: 2021–22
