= Evgeni Ignatov (footballer) =

Bulgarian footballer

Personal information
- Full name: Evgeni Yordanov Ignatov
- Date of birth: 4 June 1988 (age 38)
- Place of birth: Lovech, Bulgaria
- Height: 1.74 m (5 ft 8 1/2 in)
- Position: Midfielder

Team information
- Current team: Troyan

Youth career
- CSKA Sofia

Senior career*
Years	Team	Apps	(Gls)
2006–2009	Chavdar Etropole	58	(22)
2009–2010	Sliven 2000	23	(2)
2010	→ Sportist Svoge (loan)	13	(1)
2011–2012	Vidima-Rakovski	35	(4)
2013	Chavdar Etropole	9	(1)
2013–2014	Akademik Svishtov	19	(1)
2014	Orlicz Suchedniów		(8)
2015	Granat Skarżysko	7	(1)
2015	FC Sevlievo	12	(1)
2016–2020	Kariana Erden	112	(38)
2021–2022	Hebar	49	(12)
2022–2025	Lovech	97	(11)
2025–	Troyan	0	(0)
- * Club domestic league appearances and goals as of 12:25, 4 May 2025 (UTC)

Evgeni Ignatov (Bulgarian: Евгени Игнатов; born 4 June 1988) is a Bulgarian professional footballer who plays as a midfielder for Troyan.

== Career ==
Ignatov began his career at CSKA Sofia youth team, winning the Bulgarian youth championship in 2006. A few months later, he transferred to Chavdar Etropole, with which he played in the second division. Ignatov scored 22 goals in 58 matches for the club before moving to OFC Sliven 2000 on 1 July 2009.

In June 2022, Ignatov joined Litex Lovech.

=== Statistics ===
Club	Season	Appearances	Goals
Sportist Svoge	2009-10		
Sportist Svoge	Total		
Sliven 2000	2009-10	11	1
Sliven 2000	Total	11	1
Chavdar Etropole	2008-09	30	12
Chavdar Etropole	2007-08	28	10
Chavdar Etropole	Total	58	22
Career Totals		58	22
