= PFC Botev Plovdiv II =

Botev Plovdiv II
- Full name: PFC Botev Plovdiv II
- Nicknames: Канарчетата (The Canaries); Жълто-черните (The Yellow-Blacks)
- Founded: 1 June 2021; 5 years ago
- Ground: Sport Complex Nikola Shterev - Starika
- Capacity: 3,500
- Shareholders: PFK Botev Association (100%)
- Head coach: Petar Penchev
- League: Second League
- 2023–24: Third League, 7th (promoted)
- Website: http://www.botevplovdiv.bg/
Home colours	Away colours	Third colours

Botev Plovdiv II (Bulgarian: Ботев Пловдив II) or Botev 2 is a Bulgarian professional football team based in Plovdiv. Founded in 2021, it is the reserve team of Botev Plovdiv, and currently competes in the Second League, the second level of Bulgarian football league system.

Obliged to play one level below their main side, Botev II is ineligible for promotion to First League and also can not compete in the Bulgarian Cup.

== History ==
=== 2021–:Foundation ===
Since 2015, the Bulgarian Football Union allowed Bulgarian teams to have reserve sides in the lower regional divisions. In the beginning of 2021 Botev Plovdiv announced their intentions to create a reserve team in Second league. In May 2021, the team had doubts about starting the team, but eventually the team was officially announced on 4 June. On 7 June, Daniel Cerejido announced Stefan Stoyanov as the manager of the team, with Botev U19 team, joining the reserve team.

== Players ==
As of 15 September 2025

Note: Flags indicate national team as defined under FIFA eligibility rules; some limited exceptions apply. Players may hold more than one non-FIFA nationality.

No.	Pos.	Nation	Player
2	DF	BUL	Georgi Kushtinarov
4	DF	BUL	Kiril Tsekov
5	DF	BUL	Kostadin Tatarov
6	DF	BUL	Miroslav Georgiev
7	FW	BUL	Emil Naydenov
10	MF	BUL	Biser Bonev
13	DF	BUL	Simeon Stoyanov

No.	Pos.	Nation	Player
14	FW	BUL	Yordan Avramov
15	MF	BUL	Dimitar Dikov
16	MF	BUL	Daniel Kokov
17	MF	BUL	Maksim Simeonov
22	MF	BUL	Veliyan Vidolov
23	GK	BUL	Denis Rusev

For recent transfers, see Transfers summer 2025.

For first team players, see Botev Plovdiv.

=== Foreign players ===
Bulgarian teams can register up to five players without EU citizenship, and use all of them during match days. Those non-EU nationals with European ancestry can claim citizenship from the nation their ancestors came from. If an individual doesn't have European ancestry, he can claim Bulgarian citizenship after playing in Bulgaria for 5 years.

EU Nationals

EU Nationals (Dual citizenship)

- (Spain) (Bulgaria) Miroslav Georgiev
- (Palestine) (Bulgaria) Monir Al Badarin

Non-EU Nationals

- (Nigeria) Samuel Akere
- (Nigeria) Umeh Emmanuel
- (Nigeria) Tochukwu Nadi
- (Ivory Coast) Abdoulaye Traoré

== Personnel ==
=== Manager history ===
Dates	Name	Honours
2021–2022	(Bulgaria) Stefan Stoyanov	
2022	(Armenia) Artur Hovhannisyan	
2022	(Bosnia and Herzegovina) (Sweden) Nemanja Miljanovic	
2023	(Israel) Daniel Cohen	
2023–2024	(Bulgaria) Iliyan Garov	
2024–	(Slovenia) Dominik Beršnjak	

== Past seasons ==
Results of league and cup competitions by season
Season	League											Top goalscorer	
Season	Division	Level	P	W	D	L	F	A	GD	Pts	Pos	Top goalscorer	
2021–22	Second League	2	36	8	14	14	34	47	-13	38	16th	(Bulgaria) Ivan Vasilev	10
2022–23	Second League	2	34	7	7	20	25	52	-27	28	18th	(Ivory Coast) Abdoulaye Traoré	9
2023–24	Third League	3	38	18	7	13	84	55	+29	61	7th	(Bulgaria) Emil Naydenov	15
2024–25	Second League	2											

=== Key ===
- GS = Group stage
- QF = Quarter-finals
- SF = Semi-finals

Champions	Runners-up	Promoted	Relegated
