= 2021–22 PFC Ludogorets Razgrad season =

Ludogorets Razgrad
2021–22 season
- Chairman: Aleksandar Aleksandrov
- Manager: Valdas Dambrauskas (until 3 October); Stanislav Genchev (interim); Ante Šimundža (from 3 January)
- First League: 1st
- Bulgarian Cup: Semi-finals
- Supercup: Winners
- Champions League: Play-off round
- Europa League: Group stage
- Top goalscorer: League: Pieros Sotiriou (16); All: Pieros Sotiriou (21)
Home colours	Away colours	Third colours

The 2021–22 season is Ludogorets Razgrad's eleventh consecutive season in the Bulgarian First League, of which they were defending champions.

== Season events ==
On 26 May, Ludogorets announced the signing of Sergio Padt from Groningen.

On 11 June, Ludogorets announced the return of Ihor Plastun from Gent.

On 14 June, Dragoș Grigore and Ludogorets ended their contract by mutual agreement.

On 17 June, Ludogorets announced the signing of Dorin Rotariu from Astana.

On 19 June, Ludogorets announced the permanent signing of Kiril Despodov from Cagliari after a successful loan deal.

On 29 June, Ludogorets announced the signing of Shaquille Pinas from ADO Den Haag, and the permanent signing of Bernard Tekpetey from Schalke 04.

On 30 June, Vladislav Stoyanov, Cosmin Moți and Svetoslav Dyakov all left Ludogorets after their contracts ended.

On 21 July, Anicet Abel and Ludogorets ended their contract by mutual agreement.

On 19 August, Dan Biton was sold to Maccabi Tel Aviv.

On 27 August, Claudiu Keșerü and Ludogorets ended their contract by mutual agreement.

On 30 August, Jorginho was loaned to Wisła Płock until 30 June 2022.

On 21 December, Ludogorets announced the signing of Rick from Ceará. Two days later, 23 December, Ludogorets announced the signing of Spas Delev.

On 28 December, goalkeeper Kristijan Kahlina was sold to Major League Soccer club Charlotte FC.

On 3 January, Ludogorets announced Ante Šimundža as their new head coach.

On 4 January, Ludogorets sold Dimitar Mitkov to Lokomotiv Sofia.

On 15 January, Ludogorets announced the signing of Žan Karničnik from Mura.

On 31 January, Ludogorets announced that Elvis Manu had left the club by mutual consent, and that they had signed Simon Sluga from Luton Town.

On 2 February, Ludogorets sold Stéphane Badji to Eyüpspor and Mavis Tchibota to Maccabi Haifa.

The following day, 3 February, Josué Sá joined Maccabi Tel Aviv on loan for the rest of the season.

On 12 February, Ludogorets announced the signing of Matías Tissera from Platense.

== Squad ==
As of match played 22 May 2022

No.	Name	Nationality	Position	Date of birth (age)	Signed from	Signed in	Contract ends	Apps.	Goals
Goalkeepers
1	Sergio Padt	(Netherlands)	GK	6 June 1990 (aged 31)	Groningen	2021		22	0
12	Simon Sluga	(Croatia)	GK	17 March 1993 (aged 29)	Luton Town	2022		5	0
67	Damyan Hristov	(Bulgaria)	GK	11 October 2002 (aged 19)	Youth Team	2020		1	0
Defenders
3	Anton Nedyalkov	(Bulgaria)	DF	30 April 1993 (aged 29)	FC Dallas	2018		142	2
4	Cicinho	(Bulgaria)	DF	26 December 1988 (aged 33)	Santos	2015		218	5
5	Georgi Terziev	(Bulgaria)	DF	18 April 1992 (aged 30)	Chernomorets Burgas	2013		193	5
6	Shaquille Pinas	(Suriname)	DF	19 March 1998 (aged 24)	ADO Den Haag	2021		24	0
14	Denny Gropper	(Israel)	DF	16 March 1999 (aged 23)	Hapoel Tel Aviv	2022		4	0
21	Žan Karničnik	(Slovenia)	DF	18 September 1994 (aged 27)	Mura	2022		14	0
22	Jordan Ikoko	(Democratic Republic of the Congo)	DF	3 February 1994 (aged 28)	Guingamp	2019		86	5
24	Olivier Verdon	(Benin)	DF	5 October 1995 (aged 26)	Alavés	2021		68	3
30	Ihor Plastun	(Ukraine)	DF	20 August 1990 (aged 31)	Gent	2021		117	6
79	Tihomir Dimitrov	(Bulgaria)	DF	4 February 2000 (aged 22)	Youth Team	2018		4	0
91	Aleksandar Ganchev	(Bulgaria)	DF	9 July 2001 (aged 20)	Youth Team	2020		1	0
Midfielders
7	Alex Santana	(Brazil)	MF	13 May 1995 (aged 27)	Botafogo	2020		70	12
8	Claude Gonçalves	(Portugal)	MF	9 April 1994 (aged 28)	Gil Vicente	2021		44	0
23	Show	(Angola)	MF	6 March 1999 (aged 23)	Lille	2021		29	3
31	Georgi Valchev	(Bulgaria)	MF	5 February 2000 (aged 22)	Youth Team	2018		0	0
34	Branimir Kostadinov	(Bulgaria)	MF	4 March 1989 (aged 33)	Dunav Ruse	2019		1	0
50	Tsvetoslav Petrov	(Bulgaria)	MF	30 May 1999 (aged 22)	Youth Team	2019		2	0
51	Ilker Budinov	(Bulgaria)	MF	11 August 2000 (aged 21)	Youth Team	2019		6	0
64	Dominik Yankov	(Bulgaria)	MF	13 July 2000 (aged 21)	Sunderland	2017		89	12
73	Rick	(Brazil)	MF	2 September 1999 (aged 22)	Ceará	2021		15	0
75	Petar Georgiev	(Bulgaria)	MF	10 May 2002 (aged 20)	Youth Team	2020		3	0
82	Ivan Yordanov	(Bulgaria)	MF	7 November 2000 (aged 21)	Youth Team	2019		8	0
83	Valenin Tsvetanov	(Bulgaria)	MF	8 April 2002 (aged 20)	Youth Team	2020		1	0
85	Aleks Lukanov	(Bulgaria)	MF	22 February 2002 (aged 20)	Youth Team	2020		1	0
88	Wanderson	(Bulgaria)	MF	2 January 1988 (aged 34)	Portuguesa	2014		271	69
90	Spas Delev	(Bulgaria)	MF	25 February 1989 (aged 33)	Arda Kardzhali	2021		13	2
95	Cauly	(Brazil)	MF	15 September 1995 (aged 26)	SC Paderborn	2020		85	20
Forwards
9	Thiago	(Brazil)	FW	26 June 2001 (aged 20)	Cruzeiro	2022		2	1
10	Matías Tissera	(Argentina)	FW	6 September 1996 (aged 25)	Platense	2022		12	4
11	Kiril Despodov	(Bulgaria)	FW	11 November 1996 (aged 25)	Cagliari	2021		68	16
19	Pieros Sotiriou	(Cyprus)	FW	13 January 1993 (aged 29)	Astana	2021		54	25
37	Bernard Tekpetey	(Ghana)	FW	3 September 1997 (aged 24)	Schalke 04	2021		73	14
38	Vladislav Naydenov	(Bulgaria)	FW	29 November 2001 (aged 20)	Youth Team	2019		2	0
74	Hyusein Kelyovluev	(Bulgaria)	FW	11 May 2000 (aged 22)	Youth Team	2019		1	0
Players away on loan
9	Higinio Marín	(Spain)	FW	19 October 1993 (aged 28)	Numancia	2020		24	9
17	Jorginho	(Guinea-Bissau)	MF	21 September 1995 (aged 26)	Saint-Étienne	2019		41	8
20	Serkan Yusein	(Bulgaria)	MF	31 March 1996 (aged 26)	Botev Plovdiv	2019		12	0
29	Dorin Rotariu	(Romania)	FW	29 July 1995 (aged 26)	Astana	2021		10	1
32	Josué Sá	(Portugal)	DF	17 June 1992 (aged 29)	Anderlecht	2020		24	5
69	Damyan Damyanov	(Bulgaria)	GK	29 July 2000 (aged 21)	Youth Team	2016		1	0
Players who left during the season
8	Dan Biton	(Israel)	MF	20 July 1995 (aged 26)	Ashdod	2019		35	6
10	Elvis Manu	(Netherlands)	FW	13 August 1993 (aged 28)	Beijing Renhe	2020		57	16
13	Mavis Tchibota	(Republic of the Congo)	FW	7 May 1996 (aged 26)	Bnei Yehuda Tel Aviv	2019		98	23
25	Stéphane Badji	(Senegal)	MF	29 May 1990 (aged 31)	Bursaspor	2019		99	0
28	Claudiu Keșerü	(Romania)	FW	2 December 1986 (aged 35)	Al-Gharafa	2015		243	139
45	Dimitar Mitkov	(Bulgaria)	FW	27 January 2000 (aged 22)	Youth Team	2020		9	0
71	Kristijan Kahlina	(Croatia)	GK	24 July 1992 (aged 29)	HNK Gorica	2021		35	0
97	Georgi Chukalov	(Bulgaria)	MF	25 February 1998 (aged 24)	OFC Pomorie	2020		1	0
99	Júnior Brandão	(Brazil)	FW	7 January 1995 (aged 27)	Atlético Goianiense	2018		2	0

=== Out on loan ===
Note: Flags indicate national team as defined under FIFA eligibility rules; some limited exceptions apply. Players may hold more than one non-FIFA nationality.

No.	Pos.	Nation	Player
17	MF	GBS	Jorginho (at Wisła Płock)
20	MF	BUL	Serkan Yusein (at Beroe Stara Zagora)
32	DF	POR	Josué Sá (at Maccabi Tel Aviv)

No.	Pos.	Nation	Player
69	GK	BUL	Damyan Damyanov (at Botev Vratsa)
97	MF	BUL	Georgi Chukalov (at Spartak Varna)

== Transfers ==
=== In ===
Date	Position	Nationality	Name	From	Fee	Ref.
1 June 2021	GK	(Netherlands)	Sergio Padt	Groningen	Free	
1 June 2021	MF	(Portugal)	Claude Gonçalves	Gil Vicente	Free	
11 June 2021	DF	(Ukraine)	Ihor Plastun	Gent	Undisclosed	
17 June 2021	FW	(Romania)	Dorin Rotariu	Astana	Undisclosed	
19 June 2021	FW	(Bulgaria)	Kiril Despodov	Cagliari	Undisclosed	
29 June 2021	DF	(Suriname)	Shaquille Pinas	ADO Den Haag	Undisclosed	
29 June 2021	FW	(Ghana)	Bernard Tekpetey	Schalke 04	Undisclosed	
1 July 2021	DF	(Benin)	Olivier Verdon	Alavés	Undisclosed	
1 July 2021	GK	(Croatia)	Kristijan Kahlina	HNK Gorica	Undisclosed	
21 December 2021	MF	(Brazil)	Rick	Ceará	Undisclosed	
23 December 2021	MF	(Bulgaria)	Spas Delev	Arda Kardzhali	Undisclosed	
15 January 2022	DF	(Slovenia)	Žan Karničnik	Mura	Undisclosed	
31 January 2022	GK	(Croatia)	Simon Sluga	Luton Town	Undisclosed	
12 February 2022	FW	(Argentina)	Matías Tissera	Platense	Undisclosed	
28 February 2022	DF	(Israel)	Denny Gropper	Hapoel Tel Aviv	Undisclosed	
28 February 2022	FW	(Brazil)	Thiago	Cruzeiro	Undisclosed	

=== Out ===
Date	Position	Nationality	Name	To	Fee	Ref.
1 July 2021	FW	(Poland)	Jakub Świerczok	Piast Gliwice	Undisclosed	
19 August 2021	MF	(Israel)	Dan Biton	Maccabi Tel Aviv	Undisclosed	
28 December 2021	GK	(Croatia)	Kristijan Kahlina	Charlotte FC	Undisclosed	
4 January 2022	FW	(Bulgaria)	Dimitar Mitkov	Lokomotiv Sofia	Undisclosed	
2 February 2022	MF	(Senegal)	Stéphane Badji	Eyüpspor	Undisclosed	
2 February 2022	FW	(Republic of the Congo)	Mavis Tchibota	Maccabi Haifa	Undisclosed	
6 April 2022	FW	(Brazil)	Júnior Brandão	Operário Ferroviário	Undisclosed	

=== Loans out ===
Start date	Position	Nationality	Name	To	End date	Ref.
1 July 2021	GK	(Bulgaria)	Damyan Damyanov	Botev Vratsa	30 June 2022	
1 July 2021	MF	(Bulgaria)	Serkan Yusein	Beroe Stara Zagora	30 June 2022	
2 August 2021	FW	(Brazil)	Júnior Brandão	CRB	31 December 2021	
30 August 2021	MF	(Guinea-Bissau)	Jorginho	Wisła Płock	30 June 2022	
1 January 2022	MF	(Bulgaria)	Georgi Chukalov	Spartak Varna	30 June 2022	
25 January 2022	FW	(Romania)	Dorin Rotariu	Atromitos	End of season	
3 February 2022	DF	(Portugal)	Josué Sá	Maccabi Tel Aviv	30 June 2022	
28 February 2022	FW	(Spain)	Higinio Marín	Górnik Zabrze	30 June 2022	

=== Released ===
Date	Position	Nationality	Name	Joined	Date	Ref.
14 June 2021	DF	(Romania)	Dragoș Grigore	Rapid București		
30 June 2021	GK	(Bulgaria)	Vladislav Stoyanov	Retired		
30 June 2021	DF	(Romania)	Cosmin Moți	Retired		
30 June 2021	MF	(Bulgaria)	Svetoslav Dyakov	Pirin Blagoevgrad	1 July 2021	
30 June 2021	MF	(Bulgaria)	Svetoslav Kovachev	Arda Kardzhali	1 July 2021	
21 July 2021	MF	(Madagascar)	Anicet Abel	Future FC	26 October 2021	
27 August 2021	FW	(Romania)	Claudiu Keșerü	FCSB	31 August 2021	
31 January 2022	FW	(Netherlands)	Elvis Manu	Wisła Kraków	28 February 2022	

== Friendlies ==
16 June 2021	Ludogorets Razgrad (Bulgaria)	2–0	(Germany) SV Heimstetten	Kufstein, Austria
18:00 CEST (UTC+2)	Tchibota 55'; Manu 69'	Report		Stadium: Kufstein Arena; Attendance: 0

19 June 2021	Ludogorets Razgrad (Bulgaria)	1–1	(Romania) CFR Cluj	Seekirchen am Wallersee, Austria
17:00 CEST (UTC+2)	Keșerü 37'	Report	Omrani 54'	Stadium: Sportplatz Seekirchen; Attendance: 0

23 June 2021	Ludogorets Razgrad (Bulgaria)	1–3	(Hungary) Ferencváros	Kufstein, Austria
16:00 CEST (UTC+2)	Sotiriou 82'	Report	Uzuni 23'; Boli 74'; Laïdouni 88'	Stadium: Kufstein Arena; Attendance: 0

27 June 2021	Ludogorets Razgrad (Bulgaria)	3–0	(Austria) LASK	Mondsee, Austria
16:00 CEST (UTC+2)	Despodov 20'; Sotiriou 37'; Keșerü 80'	Report		Stadium: Mondsee Arena; Attendance: 0

18 January 2022	Wisła Kraków (Poland)	1–1	(Bulgaria) Ludogorets Razgrad	Belek, Turkey
16:30 EET (UTC+2)	Szot 81'; P.Koncewicz-Żyłka (yellow card) 90'	Report	Sotiriou 4'	Stadium: Calista Sports Complex

21 January 2022	Wolfsberger AC (Austria)	3–3	(Bulgaria) Ludogorets Razgrad	Belek, Turkey
15:30 EET (UTC+2)	Baribo 17'; Vizinger 30'; Dieng 72'	Report	Manu 45'; Higinio 81'; Tchibota 84'	Stadium: Titanic Sports Complex

27 January 2022	Ludogorets Razgrad (Bulgaria)	2–1	(Poland) Wisła Płock	Belek, Turkey
16:00 EET (UTC+2)	Manu 21'; Brandão 25'; Verdon (yellow card) 31'	Report	Wolski 29'; Rasak (yellow card) 60'; Tuszyński (penalty missed) 95'	Stadium: Titanic Sports Complex
Note: Match consisted of two 60 minute halves.

31 January 2022	Dynamo Kyiv (Ukraine)	4–1	(Bulgaria) Ludogorets Razgrad	Belek, Turkey
16:00 EET (UTC+2)	Harmash 16' (pen.) (yellow card) 45'; Shepelyev (yellow card) 21'; Tymchyk (yellow card) 22'; Vitinho 38'; Shaparenko 48'; Shkurin 75'	Report	Show (yellow card) 7' (yellow-red card) 15'; Cauly (yellow card) 28'; Sotiriou (yellow card) 32'; Ikoko (yellow card) 45'; Despodov 78'	Stadium: Titanic Sports Complex
Note: Show replaced by Alex Santana after being sent off.

1 February 2022	Ludogorets Razgrad (Bulgaria)	1–0	(Georgia (country)) Dinamo Tbilisi	Belek, Turkey
16:00 EET (UTC+2)	Badji 71'	Report		Stadium: Titanic Sports Complex

7 February 2022	Ludogorets Razgrad	4–0	Spartak Varna	Razgrad
16:00 EET (UTC+2)	Delev 4', 23'; Cauly 33'; Despodov 67'	Report		Stadium: Huvepharma Arena

== Competitions ==
=== Overview ===
Competition	First match	Last match	Starting round	Final position	Record							
Competition	First match	Last match	Starting round	Final position	Pld	W	D	L	GF	GA	GD	Win %
A Football Group	7 August 2021	22 May 2022	Matchday 1	Winners	30	25	1	4	76	25	+51	83.33
Bulgarian Cup	23 September 2021	22 April 2022	Round of 32	Semifinal	5	3	0	2	11	5	+6	60.00
Supercup	17 July 2021	17 July 2021	Final	Winners	1	1	0	0	4	0	+4	100.00
UEFA Champions League	7 July 2021	24 August 2021	First qualifying round	Play-off Round	8	4	3	1	10	7	+3	50.00
UEFA Europa League	16 September 2021	9 December 2021	Group Stage	Group Stage	6	0	2	4	3	8	−5	0.00
Total					50	33	6	11	104	45	+59	66.00

Last updated: 14 May 2022
Source: Competitions

=== Bulgarian Supercup ===
17 July 2021	Ludogorets Razgrad	4–0	CSKA Sofia	Sofia
20:30 EEST (UTC+3)	Santana (yellow card) 17', (goal) 29'; Yankov 41'; Sotiriou 49'; Nedyalkov (yellow card) 52'; Tchibota 84' (yellow card) 88'; Ikoko (yellow card) 89'	Report	Caicedo (yellow card) 17'; Galabov (yellow card) 66'; Yomov (yellow card) 88' (yellow-red card) 90+2'	Stadium: Natsionalen stadion Vasil Levski; Attendance: 8,800; Referee: Ivaylo Stoyanov

=== Parva Liga ===
==== Regular stage ====
===== Table =====
Pos	Team	Pld	W	D	L	GF	GA	GD	Pts	Qualification
1	Ludogorets Razgrad	26	21	1	4	64	23	+41	64	Qualification for the Championship group
2	CSKA Sofia	26	15	7	4	39	25	+14	52	Qualification for the Championship group
3	Botev Plovdiv	26	13	7	6	34	28	+6	46	Qualification for the Championship group
4	Cherno More	26	12	9	5	35	18	+17	45	Qualification for the Championship group
5	Levski Sofia	26	12	6	8	33	25	+8	42	Qualification for the Championship group

Source: soccerway, Bulgarian Football
Rules for classification: 1) Points; 2) Head-to-head points; 3) Head-to-head goal difference; 4) Head-to-head goals scored; 5) Head-to-head away goals scored (only if two teams); 6) Goal difference; 7) Goals scored; 8) Fairplay ranking; 9) Draw.

===== Results summary =====
Overall								Home						Away					
Pld	W	D	L	GF	GA	GD	Pts	W	D	L	GF	GA	GD	W	D	L	GF	GA	GD
26	21	1	4	64	23	+41	64	12	0	1	37	9	+28	9	1	3	27	14	+13

Last updated: 9 April 2022.
Source: See Results

===== Results by round =====
Game	1	2	3	4	5	6	7	8	9	10	11	12	13	14	15	16	17	18	19	20	21	22	23	24	25	26
Ground	A	H	H	A	H	A	H	A	H	A	H	H	A	H	H	A	H	A	A	A	H	A	H	A	H	A
Result	W	W	W	W	W	L	W	W	W	W	W	W	L	W	W	W	L	L	W	W	W	W	W	D	W	W
Position	2	1	3	5	4	2	1	3	1	1	1	1	1	1	1	1	1	1	1	1	1	1	1	1	1	1

Source: See Results
A = Away; H = Home; W = Win; D = Draw; L = Loss

===== Results =====
25 July 2021 1	Lokomotiv Plovdiv	1–3	Ludogorets Razgrad	Plovdiv
21:00 EEST (UTC+3)	Iliev 67'; Gomis (yellow card) 79'	Report	Manu 44'; Despodov 76'; Tekpetey 90+4'	Stadium: Lokomotiv; Referee: Nikola Popov

31 July 2021 2	Ludogorets Razgrad	3–0	CSKA 1948	Razgrad
21:00 EEST (UTC+3)	Cicinho (yellow card) 23'; Tekpetey (yellow card) 40', (goal) 45+4'; Manu (yellow card) 44', (goal) 73'; Terziev (yellow card) 61'; Rotariu 65'	Report	Chochev (yellow card) 50'	Stadium: Huvepharma Arena; Referee: Georgi Davidov

21 August 2021 5	Ludogorets Razgrad	5–0	Lokomotiv Sofia	Razgrad
21:00 EEST (UTC+3)	Wanderson 21'; Yankov 23', (yellow card) 54'; Sá 51'; Tchibota 59'; Cauly 68'	Report		Stadium: Huvepharma Arena; Referee: Georgi Kabakov

29 August 2021 6	Pirin Blagoevgrad	1–3	Ludogorets Razgrad	Blagoevgrad
21:0 EEST (UTC+3)	Brahimi 3', (yellow card) 18'	Report	Sá (yellow card) 11', (goal) 15'; Santana 56'; Sotiriou 67' (pen.)	Stadium: Hristo Botev; Referee: Stanislav Todorov

11 September 2021 7	Ludogorets Razgrad	2–0	Cherno More	Razgrad
18:30 EEST (UTC+3)	Manu 16'; Despodov 70' (pen.)	Report	Drobarov (yellow card) 5'; Atanasov (yellow card) 68'	Stadium: Huvepharma Arena; Referee: Volen Chinkov

19 September 2021 8	Slavia Sofia	1–0	Ludogorets Razgrad	Sofia
20:30 EEST (UTC+3)	Tasev 49', (yellow card) 49'; Georgiev (red card) 58'; Hristov (yellow card) 77'; M. Atanasov (yellow card) 90+3'	Report	Sotiriou (yellow card) 45+4'; Tekpetey (yellow card) 59'; Cicinho (yellow card) 87'	Stadium: Slavia; Referee: Ivaylo Stoyanov

26 September 2021 9	Ludogorets Razgrad	3–1	Botev Vratsa	Razgrad
19:15 EEST (UTC+3)	Tekpetey 9'; Sotiriou 35', 38'; Pinas (yellow card) 67'; Verdon (yellow card) 74'	Report	Cassini 17'; Zhelev (yellow card) 38'; Serginho (yellow card) 82'	Stadium: Huvepharma Arena; Referee: Georgi Ginchev

3 October 2021 10	Levski Sofia	2–4	Ludogorets Razgrad	Sofia
20:15 EEST (UTC+3)	Kraev (yellow card) 14'; B. Tsonev 26', 81' (pen.); Bari (yellow card) 49'; Shelis (yellow card) 74'; R. Tsonev (yellow card) 80'; M. Petkov (yellow card) 86'	Report	Yankov 29'; Sotiriou 47', (yellow card) 48'; Plastun (yellow card) 68'; Manu 85', (yellow card) 85'; Gonçalves (yellow card) 87'; Tekpetey 89'	Stadium: Vivacom Arena - Georgi Asparuhov; Referee: Georgi Kabakov

16 October 2021 11	Ludogorets Razgrad	4–0	Tsarsko Selo	Razgrad
17:30 EEST (UTC+3)	Despodov (yellow card) 45+1', (goal) 87'; Sá 56'; Sotiriou 66'; Santana 78'	Report	Bandalovski (yellow card) 45+1'	Stadium: Huvepharma Arena; Referee: Ivaylo Nenkov

25 October 2021 12	Botev Plovdiv	1–3	Ludogorets Razgrad	Plovdiv
18:30 EEST (UTC+3)	Nedelev 4'; Konate (yellow card) 16'; Mertens (yellow card) 21' (yellow-red card) 59'	Report	Santana 24', (yellow card) 72'; Sotiriou 55'; Ikoko 90+1'	Stadium: Futbolen kompleks Botev 1912; Referee: Georgi Ginchev

31 October 2021 13	Ludogorets Razgrad	2–0	Beroe	Razgrad
19:00 EET (UTC+2)	Tchibota 33', (yellow card) 70'; Gonçalves (yellow card) 38'; Terziev (yellow card) 76'; Tekpetey 90+3'	Report	Daskalov (yellow card) 36'; Hadzhiev (yellow card) 38'; Vasilev (yellow card) 67'	Stadium: Huvepharma Arena; Referee: Stanislav Todorov

7 November 2021 14	Ludogorets Razgrad	1–0	Lokomotiv Plovdiv	Razgrad
18:00 EET (UTC+2)	Tchibota (yellow card) 87'; Gomis 90' (o.g.); Higinio (yellow card) 90+5'	Report	Gomis (yellow card) 55'; Paskalev (yellow card) 60' (yellow-red card) 90+6'; Minchev (yellow card) 89'	Stadium: Huvepharma Arena; Referee: Dragomir Draganov

21 November 2021 15	CSKA 1948	2–0	Ludogorets Razgrad	Sofia
15:30 EET (UTC+2)	Pirgov (yellow card) 43'; Chochev 48'; Rusev 81'	Report	Verdon (red card) 8'; Cicinho (yellow card) 62'	Stadium: Bistritsa; Referee: Georgi Dimitrov

29 November 2021 16	Ludogorets Razgrad	2–0	CSKA Sofia	Razgrad
17:15 EET (UTC+2)	Gonçalves (yellow card) 28'; Despodov (yellow card) 43'; Sotiriou 78' (pen.); Cicinho (yellow card) 85'; Show (yellow card) 87'; Tchibota 90+1', (yellow card) 90+2'	Report	Mattheij (yellow card) 22'; Carey (yellow card) 63'; Lam (yellow card) 64'	Stadium: Huvepharma Arena; Referee: Georgi Kabakov

2 December 2021 17	Ludogorets Razgrad	4–1	Arda	Razgrad
15:00 EET (UTC+2)	Ikoko 7'; Sotiriou 29', 41'; Plastun (yellow card) 33'; Despodov 59'; Badji (yellow card) 76'	Report	Delev 36'; Petkov (yellow card) 58'	Stadium: Huvepharma Arena; Referee: Vladimir Valkov

5 December 2021 18	Lokomotiv Sofia	2–4	Ludogorets Razgrad	Sofia
14:30 EET (UTC+2)	Krachunov (yellow card) 33', (goal) 64'; Katsarov (yellow card) 37'; Octávio 47'	Report	Sotiriou 5', 38' (pen.); Gonçalves (yellow card) 43'; Ikoko 45+1', (yellow card) 62'; Despodov 48'; Cicinho (yellow card) 60'	Stadium: Natsionalen stadion Vasil Levski; Referee: Nikola Popov

13 December 2021 19	Ludogorets Razgrad	3–5	Pirin Blagoevgrad	Razgrad
16:30 EET (UTC+2)	Verdon 77'; Despodov 89' (pen.); Cauly 90'	Report	Hubchev 15'; Brahimi (yellow card) 23', (goal) 46', 70'; Verdon 38' (o.g.); Dyakov (yellow card) 51'; Karachanakov (yellow card) 83'; Bengyuzov 90+1'	Stadium: Huvepharma Arena; Referee: Vasimir El-Hatib

20 December 2021 3	CSKA Sofia	1–0	Ludogorets Razgrad	Sofia
16:30 EET (UTC+2)	Lam (yellow card) 32'; Muhar (yellow card) 44' (yellow-red card) 90+1'; Mattheij (yellow card) 46', (goal) 77'; Caicedo (yellow card) 81'; Vion (yellow card) 85'; Yomov (yellow card) 90+8'; Evtimov (yellow card) 90+10'	Report	Pinas (yellow card) 39'; Verdon (yellow card) 43'; Santana (yellow card) 68'; Tchibota (yellow card) 90+8'	Stadium: Balgarska Armia; Referee: Valentin Zhelezov

11 February 2022 4	Arda	0–4	Ludogorets Razgrad	Kardzhali
13:15 EET (UTC+2)	Ivanov (yellow card) 25'	Report	Sotiriou 7', (yellow card) 42'; Cauly 12'; Santana 23'; Show 39'; Pinas (yellow card) 68'	Stadium: Arena Arda; Referee: Radoslav Gidzhenov

20 February 2022 20	Cherno More	1–2	Ludogorets Razgrad	Varna
15:15 EET (UTC+2)	Panov (yellow card) 20'; Dimov (yellow card) 37'; Kasparavičius 90'	Report	Karničnik (yellow card) 4'; Cauly 33'; Sotiriou (yellow card) 37'; Drobarov 39' (o.g.); Verdon (yellow card) 52'; Santana (yellow card) 90+3'	Stadium: Ticha; Referee: Georgi Kabakov

26 February 2022 21	Ludogorets Razgrad	3–1	Slavia Sofia	Razgrad
17:30 EET (UTC+2)	Sotiriou 17', 65', (yellow card) 82'; Show 29', (yellow card) 39'; Delev (yellow card) 77'; Tekpetey (yellow card) 87'	Report	Kirilov 52'; Popadiyn (yellow card) 72'	Stadium: Huvepharma Arena; Referee: Georgi Ginchev

7 March 2022 22	Botev Vratsa	1–2	Ludogorets Razgrad	Vratsa
17:00 EET (UTC+2)	Marinov 3'; Luiz Felipe (yellow card) 6'; Kostov (yellow card) 90+4'	Report	Santana 16'; Show (yellow card) 38'; Delev (yellow card) 47'; Plastun (yellow card) 81'; Sotiriou 90+7'	Stadium: Hristo Botev; Referee: Dragomir Draganov

13 March 2022 23	Ludogorets Razgrad	2–1	Levski Sofia	Razgrad
17:45 EET (UTC+2)	Sotiriou (yellow card) 35', (goal) 90'; Santana 62', (yellow card) 68'; Rick (yellow card) 86'; Despodov (yellow card) 88'	Report	Bari 20'; Sundberg (yellow card) 35'; Stefanov (yellow card) 50' van der Kaap (yellow card) 53'	Stadium: Huvepharma Arena; Referee: Georgi Kabakov

19 March 2022 24	Tsarsko Selo	1–1	Ludogorets Razgrad	Sofia
15:00 EET (UTC+2)	Ayoub (yellow card) 5'; Lucas 12'; Zebli (yellow card) 18'; Nikolaev (yellow card) 73'	Report	Santana (yellow card) 31'; Verdon (yellow card) 52', (goal) 56'; Despodov (yellow card) 58'	Stadium: Arena Tsarsko Selo; Referee: Volen Chinkov

3 April 2022 25	Ludogorets Razgrad	3–0	Botev Plovdiv	Razgrad
20:00 EEST (UTC+3)	Tekpetey 10', (yellow card) 44'; Verdon 19'; Cauly 57'	Report		Stadium: Huvepharma Arena; Referee: Nikola Popov

9 April 2022 26	Beroe	0–1	Ludogorets Razgrad	Stara Zagora
17:30 EEST (UTC+3)		Report	Gonçalves (yellow card) 18'; Cauly (yellow card) 54'; Tekpetey 59', (yellow card) 61'; Cicinho (yellow card) 87'	Stadium: Beroe; Referee: Georgi Ivanov

==== Championship stage ====
===== Table =====
Pos	Team	Pld	W	D	L	GF	GA	GD	Pts	Qualification
1	Ludogorets Razgrad (C)	31	26	1	4	77	25	+52	79	Qualification for the Champions League first qualifying round
2	CSKA Sofia	31	16	10	5	42	31	+11	58	Qualification for the Europa Conference League second qualifying round
3	Botev Plovdiv (O)	31	15	8	8	38	33	+5	53	Qualification for the Europa Conference League play-off
4	Levski Sofia	31	15	7	9	38	27	+11	52	Qualification for the Europa Conference League second qualifying round (Note: Levski Sofia qualified for the Europa Conference League by winning the 2021–22 Bulgarian Cup.)
5	Cherno More	31	12	11	8	36	22	+14	47	
6	Slavia Sofia	31	9	10	12	35	38	−3	37	

Source: Soccerway, Bulgarian Football
Rules for classification: 1) Points; 2) Head-to-head points; 3) Head-to-head goal difference; 4) Head-to-head goals scored; 5) Head-to-head away goals scored (only if two teams); 6) Goal difference; 7) Goals scored; 8) Fairplay ranking; 9) Draw.
(C) Champions; (O) Play-off winners

===== Results summary =====
Overall								Home						Away					
Pld	W	D	L	GF	GA	GD	Pts	W	D	L	GF	GA	GD	W	D	L	GF	GA	GD
5	5	0	0	13	2	+11	15	3	0	0	10	1	+9	2	0	0	3	1	+2

Last updated: 22 May 2022.
Source: See Results

===== Results by round =====
Game	1	2	3	4	5
Ground	H	H	A	H	A
Result	W	W	W	W	W
Position	1	1	1	1	1

Source: See Results
A = Away; H = Home; W = Win; D = Draw; L = Loss

===== Results =====
17 April 2022 27	Ludogorets Razgrad	4–1	Slavia Sofia	Razgrad
20:00 EEST (UTC+3)	Zajkov 14' (o.g.); Tekpetey 16', 54'; Tissera 23'; Terziev (yellow card) 60'	Report	Atanasov (yellow card) 36'; Bakero (yellow card) 77', (goal) 78'	Stadium: Huvepharma Arena; Referee: Vladimir Valkov

30 April 2022 28	Ludogorets Razgrad	5–0	CSKA Sofia	Razgrad
20:00 EEST (UTC+3)	Yankov 15', 56'; Tissera 30'; Tekpetey 51'; Thiago 63'; Gonçalves (yellow card) 73'	Report		Stadium: Huvepharma Arena; Referee: Radoslav Gidzhenov

6 May 2022 29	Botev Plovdiv	1–2	Ludogorets Razgrad	Plovdiv
15:00 EEST (UTC+3)	Souprayen (yellow card) 23'; Konate 45'; Genev (yellow card) 64'; Lahne (yellow card) 82'; Tonev (yellow card) 85'; Nedelev (yellow card) 86'; Baroan (yellow card) 90+2'	Report	Delev 39'; Eto'o 56' (o.g.); Cicinho (yellow card) 71'	Stadium: Futbolen kompleks Botev 1912; Referee: Georgi Ginchev

14 May 2022 30	Ludogorets Razgrad	1–0	Cherno More	Razgrad
18:30 EEST (UTC+3)	Rick (yellow card) 20'; Show (yellow card) 41'; Sotiriou 52' (pen.)	Report	Benchaâ (yellow card) 27'	Stadium: Huvepharma Arena; Referee: Georgi Dimitrov

22 May 2022 31	Levski Sofia	0–1	Ludogorets Razgrad	Sofia
20:30 EEST (UTC+3)	van der Kaap (yellow card) 35'; Kraev (yellow card) 41'; Mihajlović (yellow card) 56'	Report	Verdon (yellow card) 11'; Cicinho 28'; Sotiriou (yellow card) 58'; Plastun (yellow card) 90'; Tekpetey (yellow card) 90+2'	Stadium: Vivacom Arena - Georgi Asparuhov; Referee: Vladimir Valkov

=== Bulgarian Cup ===
23 September 2021 Round of 32	Spartak Varna	0–1	Ludogorets Razgrad	Varna
16:00 EEST (UTC+3)	Ibryam (yellow card) 45'; I. Kolev (yellow card) 48'; Boev (yellow card) 90+4'	Report	Higinio 45+2' (pen.); Show (yellow card) 59'; Tchibota (yellow card) 90+4'	Stadium: Spartak; Referee: Stanislav Todorov

28 October 2021 Round of 16	Ludogorets Razgrad	3–1	Lokomotiv Gorna Oryahovitsa	Razgrad
16:00 EEST (UTC+3)	Higinio 12'; Manu 37'; Show 79'	Report	Tsachev (yellow card) 4'; G.Kolev 58'; Atanasov (yellow card) 62'	Stadium: Huvepharma Arena; Referee: Georgi Ivanov

2 March 2022 Quarterfinal	Montana	0–5	Ludogorets Razgrad	Razgrad (Note: Montana will play their quarterfinal home match at Huvepharma Arena, Razgrad, instead of their regular stadium Ogosta in Montana, which is undergoing renovation works.)
14:30 EET (UTC+2)		Report	Yankov 5', 45+1'; Tissera 16', 34'; Cauly 79'	Stadium: Huvepharma Arena; Referee: Radoslav Gidzhenov

13 April 2022 Semifinal 1st leg	Ludogorets Razgrad	2–3	Levski Sofia	Razgrad
19:00 EEST (UTC+3)	Despodov 11', (yellow card) 65'; Rick (yellow card) 30'; Nedyalkov (yellow card) 34' (yellow-red card) 80'; Sotiriou (yellow card) 80', (goal) 90+3' (pen.); Delev (yellow card) 90+1'; Plastun (yellow card) 90+8' (yellow-red card) after FT'; Tissera (yellow card) 90+13'	Report	Krastev (yellow card) 32'; Mihajlović 52'; Bari 57'; Córdoba (yellow card) 78' (yellow-red card) 80'; Tsunami (yellow card) 90+2'; M. Petkov 90+11' (pen.), (yellow card) 90+12'	Stadium: Huvepharma Arena; Referee: Ivaylo Stoyanov

22 April 2022 Semifinal 2nd leg	Levski Sofia	1–0 (4–2 agg.)	Ludogorets Razgrad	Sofia
19:00 EEST (UTC+3)	Welton 3', (yellow card) 82'; Córdoba (yellow card) 54'; Sundberg (yellow card) 89'	Report	Rick (yellow card) 54'; Gonçalves (yellow card) 90+2'	Stadium: Vivacom Arena - Georgi Asparuhov; Referee: Dragomir Draganov

=== UEFA Champions League ===
==== Qualifying rounds ====
7 July 2021 First qualifying round 1st leg	Ludogorets Razgrad (Bulgaria)	1–0	(Belarus) Shakhtyor Soligorsk	Razgrad, Bulgaria
20:00 EEST (UTC+3)	Cauly 90+2'; Despodov (yellow card) 90+3'	Report	Sachywka (yellow card) 31'; Szöke (yellow card) 34'; Antić (yellow card) 86'	Stadium: Huvepharma Arena; Attendance: 4,762; Referee: Rohit Saggi (Norway)

13 July 2021 First qualifying round 2nd leg	Shakhtyor Soligorsk (Belarus)	0–1 (0–2 agg.)	(Bulgaria) Ludogorets Razgrad	Belgrade, Serbia
22:30 EEST (UTC+3)	Shevchenko (yellow card) 90+1'	Report	Despodov 71'	Stadium: Čukarički Stadium; Attendance: 0 Referee: Arda Kardeşler (Turkey)
Note: Match played behind closed doors. Shakhtyor Soligorsk played their home match at Čukarički Stadium, Belgrade (Serbia), instead of their regular stadium Stroitel Stadium, Soligorsk, as in June 2021 UEFA suspended most matches to be played in Belarus, due to European Union sanctions in response to the Ryanair Flight 4978 incident which banned European Union airlines from flying over Belarusian airspace.

21 July 2021 Second qualifying round 1st leg	Mura (Slovenia)	0–0	(Bulgaria) Ludogorets Razgrad	Murska Sobota, Slovenia
21:00 EEST (UTC+3)	Karničnik (yellow card) 9'	Report	Plastun (yellow card) 54'	Stadium: Fazanerija; Attendance: 3,450; Referee: Harm Osmers (Germany)

28 July 2021 Second qualifying round 2nd leg	Ludogorets Razgrad (Bulgaria)	3–1 (3–1 agg.)	(Slovenia) Mura	Razgrad, Bulgaria
21:00 EEST (UTC+3)	Sotiriou 4'; Tekpetey (yellow card) 35'; Despodov (yellow card) 50'; Manu 82'; Cauly 90' (yellow card) 90+1'	Report	Horvat 64'	Stadium: Huvepharma Arena; Attendance: 5,008; Referee: Marco Di Bello (Italy)

3 August 2021 Third qualifying round 1st leg	Olympiacos (Greece)	1–1	(Bulgaria) Ludogorets Razgrad	Piraeus, Greece
22:00 EEST (UTC+3)	Semedo (yellow card) 43'; Cissé (yellow card) 48'; A. Camara 87'	Report	Despodov 50'; Tekpetey (yellow card) 57'; Nedyalkov (yellow card) 90+3'	Stadium: Georgios Karaiskakis; Attendance: 9,212; Referee: Bobby Madden (Scotland)

10 August 2021 Third qualifying round 2nd leg	Ludogorets Razgrad (Bulgaria)	2–2 (a.e.t.) (3–3 agg.) (4–1 p)	(Greece) Olympiacos	Razgrad, Bulgaria
21:00 EEST (UTC+3)	Badji (yellow card) 27'; Despodov (yellow card) 43'; Semedo 49' (o.g.); Sotiriou 57' (pen.); Verdon (yellow card) 66'; Gonçalves (yellow card) 111'	Report	M'Vila 31'; Ba (yellow card) 33' (yellow-red card) 86'; El-Arabi 68' (pen.); Reabciuk (yellow card) 82'	Stadium: Huvepharma Arena; Attendance: 5,118; Referee: Orel Grinfeld (Israel)
	Penalties
	Sotiriou (penalty scored); Santana (penalty scored); Verdon (penalty scored); Cicinho (penalty scored)		(penalty missed) Valbuena; (penalty missed) Hassan; (penalty scored) Lala

18 August 2021 Play-off round 1st leg	Malmö FF (Sweden)	2–0	(Bulgaria) Ludogorets Razgrad	Malmö, Sweden
22:00 EEST (UTC+3)	Lewicki (yellow card) 11'; Birmančević 26'; Brorsson (yellow card) 49'; Berget 61'	Report	Tekpetey (yellow card) 36'	Stadium: Eleda Stadion; Attendance: 5,463; Referee: Antonio Mateu Lahoz (Spain)

24 August 2021 Play-off round 2nd leg	Ludogorets Razgrad (Bulgaria)	2–1 (2–3 agg.)	(Sweden) Malmö FF	Razgrad, Bulgaria
22:00 EEST (UTC+3)	Nedyalkov 10'; Badji (yellow card) 37'; Yankov (yellow card) 48'; Sotiriou 60' (pen.), (yellow card) 90+1'	Report	Birmančević 42'; Ahmedhodžić (yellow card) 80'; Rieks (yellow card) 90+1'	Stadium: Huvepharma Arena; Attendance: 5,130; Referee: Clément Turpin (France)

=== UEFA Europa League ===
==== Group stage ====
Pos	Team	Pld	W	D	L	GF	GA	GD	Pts	Qualification
1	(Serbia) Red Star Belgrade	6	3	2	1	6	4	+2	11	Advance to round of 16
2	(Portugal) Braga	6	3	1	2	12	9	+3	10	Advance to knockout round play-offs
3	(Denmark) Midtjylland	6	2	3	1	7	7	0	9	Transfer to Europa Conference League
4	(Bulgaria) Ludogorets Razgrad	6	0	2	4	3	8	−5	2	

Source: UEFA
Rules for classification: Group stage tiebreakers

16 September 2021 1	Midtjylland (Denmark)	1–1	(Bulgaria) Ludogorets Razgrad	Herning, Denmark
19:45 EEST (UTC+3)	Isaksen 3'; Onyedika (yellow card) 85'	Report	Despodov 32'; Badji (yellow card) 35'; Santana (yellow card) 45'; Cicinho (yellow card) 90+8'	Stadium: MCH Arena; Attendance: 6,568; Referee: Aliyar Aghayev (Azerbaijan)

30 September 2021 2	Ludogorets Razgrad (Bulgaria)	0–1	(Serbia) Red Star Belgrade	Razgrad, Bulgaria
22:00 EEST (UTC+3)	Cicinho (red card) 52'	Report	Diony (yellow card) 13'; Ivanić (yellow card) 17'; Kanga (yellow card) 45+3' (goal) 64'; Pavkov (yellow card) 66'; Stanić (yellow card) 81'	Stadium: Huvepharma Arena; Attendance: 3,078; Referee: Jérôme Brisard (France)

21 October 2021 3	Ludogorets Razgrad (Bulgaria)	0–1	(Portugal) Braga	Razgrad, Bulgaria
19:45 EEST (UTC+3)	Tekpetey (yellow card) 48'; Gonçalves (yellow card) 67'; Sá (yellow card) 72'; Santana (yellow card) 90+4'	Report	R. Horta 7'; Leite (yellow card) 24'; Al-Musrati (yellow card) 26'	Stadium: Huvepharma Arena; Attendance: 2,280; Referee: Kristo Tohver (Estonia)

4 November 2021 4	Braga (Portugal)	4–2	(Bulgaria) Ludogorets Razgrad	Braga, Portugal
22:00 EET (UTC+2)	Al-Musrati 25'; Castro (yellow card) 27'; Medeiros 37'; Galeno 40'; González 73'	Report	Sotiriou 33'; Show (yellow card) 38'; Plastun 79', (yellow card) 80'	Stadium: Estádio Municipal; Attendance: 6,221; Referee: Glenn Nyberg (Sweden)

25 November 2021 5	Red Star Belgrade (Serbia)	1–0	(Bulgaria) Ludogorets Razgrad	Belgrade, Serbia
19:45 EET (UTC+2)	Ivanić 57'; Srnić (yellow card) 63'; Krstičić (yellow card) 69'; Gajić (yellow card) 87'; Eraković (yellow card) 88'	Report	Sotiriou (yellow card) 85'	Stadium: Rajko Mitić; Attendance: 11,252; Referee: José María Sánchez Martínez (Spain)

9 December 2021 6	Ludogorets Razgrad (Bulgaria)	0–0	(Denmark) Midtjylland	Razgrad, Bulgaria
22:00 EET (UTC+2)	Despodov (yellow card) 19'; Cicinho (yellow card) 24'	Report	Dyhr (yellow card) 28'; Paulinho (yellow card) 38'; Charles (yellow card) 74'	Stadium: Huvepharma Arena; Attendance: 556; Referee: Tobias Stieler (Germany)

== Squad statistics ==
As of match played 22 May 2022

=== Appearances and goals ===
No.	Pos	Nat	Player	Total		A Group		Bulgarian Cup		Super Cup		Champions League		Europa League	
No.	Pos	Nat	Player	Apps	Goals	Apps	Goals	Apps	Goals	Apps	Goals	Apps	Goals	Apps	Goals
1	GK	(Netherlands) NED	Sergio Padt	23	0	20	0	1	0	0	0	0	0	2	0
3	DF	(Bulgaria) BUL	Anton Nedyalkov	20	1	4+4	0	2	0	1	0	8	1	1	0
4	DF	(Bulgaria) BUL	Cicinho	35	1	21+3	1	3	0	1	0	0+3	0	4	0
5	DF	(Bulgaria) BUL	Georgi Terziev	18	0	7+7	0	3	0	0	0	0	0	1	0
6	DF	(Suriname) SUR	Shaquille Pinas	24	0	15+2	0	2	0	0	0	0	0	3+2	0
7	MF	(Brazil) BRA	Alex Santana	36	7	14+6	6	4+1	0	1	1	3+4	0	2+1	0
8	MF	(Portugal) POR	Claude Gonçalves	44	0	21+6	0	2	0	1	0	8	0	6	0
9	FW	(Brazil) BRA	Thiago	2	1	0+2	1	0	0	0	0	0	0	0	0
10	FW	(Argentina) ARG	Matías Tissera	12	4	4+5	2	1+2	2	0	0	0	0	0	0
11	FW	(Bulgaria) BUL	Kiril Despodov	41	10	21+4	6	2	1	1	0	7	2	5+1	1
12	GK	(Croatia) CRO	Simon Sluga	4	0	1	0	3	0	0	0	0	0	0	0
14	DF	(Israel) ISR	Denny Gropper	4	0	2+2	0	0	0	0	0	0	0	0	0
19	FW	(Cyprus) CYP	Pieros Sotiriou	42	23	20+5	17	2	1	1	1	7+1	3	5+1	1
21	DF	(Slovenia) SLO	Žan Karničnik	14	0	10+1	0	2+1	0	0	0	0	0	0	0
22	DF	(Democratic Republic of the Congo) COD	Jordan Ikoko	30	3	10+5	3	0+1	0	0+1	0	8	0	4+1	0
23	MF	(Angola) ANG	Show	29	3	15+6	2	3+1	1	0	0	0	0	2+2	0
24	DF	(Benin) BEN	Olivier Verdon	39	3	21+1	3	3	0	1	0	8	0	4+1	0
30	DF	(Ukraine) UKR	Ihor Plastun	41	1	24	0	2	0	1	0	8	0	5+1	1
37	FW	(Ghana) GHA	Bernard Tekpetey	37	10	17+7	10	3	0	0+1	0	4+1	0	3+1	0
38	FW	(Bulgaria) BUL	Vladislav Naydenov	1	0	0	0	0+1	0	0	0	0	0	0	0
51	MF	(Bulgaria) BUL	Ilker Budinov	3	0	0	0	1+2	0	0	0	0	0	0	0
52	DF	(Bulgaria) BUL	Tihomir Dimitrov	2	0	0	0	2	0	0	0	0	0	0	0
64	MF	(Bulgaria) BUL	Dominik Yankov	42	7	17+11	4	2+2	2	1	1	1+3	0	4+1	0
73	MF	(Brazil) BRA	Rick	15	0	4+8	0	2+1	0	0	0	0	0	0	0
75	MF	(Bulgaria) BUL	Petar Georgiev	2	0	0	0	2	0	0	0	0	0	0	0
79	DF	(Bulgaria) BUL	Tihomir Dimitrov	1	0	0+1	0	0	0	0	0	0	0	0	0
88	MF	(Bulgaria) BUL	Wanderson	18	1	4+5	1	1	0	0+1	0	2+5	0	0	0
90	MF	(Bulgaria) BUL	Spas Delev	13	2	9+2	2	0+2	0	0	0	0	0	0	0
95	MF	(Brazil) BRA	Cauly	31	8	12+7	5	2+1	1	1	0	8	2	0	0
Players away from the club on loan:
9	FW	(Spain) ESP	Higinio Marín	12	2	3+7	0	2	2	0	0	0	0	0	0
29	FW	(Romania) ROU	Dorin Rotariu	10	1	2+4	1	1	0	0	0	0+1	0	0+2	0
32	DF	(Portugal) POR	Josué Sá	15	3	10	3	0	0	0	0	1+1	0	3	0
Players who appeared for Ludogorets Razgrad that left during the season:
10	FW	(Netherlands) NED	Elvis Manu	25	6	6+8	4	1+1	1	0+1	0	0+3	1	1+4	0
13	FW	(Republic of the Congo) CGO	Mavis Tchibota	30	4	8+8	3	0+2	0	0+1	1	0+6	0	2+3	0
25	MF	(Senegal) SEN	Stéphane Badji	31	0	10+6	0	0+2	0	0	0	6+1	0	5+1	0
28	FW	(Romania) ROU	Claudiu Keșerü	1	0	0	0	0	0	0	0	1	0	0	0
45	FW	(Bulgaria) BUL	Dimitar Mitkov	4	0	0	0	0+2	0	0	0	0	0	0+2	0
71	GK	(Croatia) CRO	Kristijan Kahlina	24	0	10	0	1	0	1	0	8	0	4	0

=== Goal scorers ===
Place	Position	Nation	Number	Name	A Group	Bulgarian Cup	Supercup	Champions League	Europa League	Total
1	FW	(Cyprus)	19	Pieros Sotiriou	17	1	1	3	1	23
2	FW	(Ghana)	37	Bernard Tekpetey	10	0	0	0	0	10
2	FW	(Bulgaria)	11	Kiril Despodov	6	1	0	2	1	10
4	MF	(Brazil)	95	Cauly	5	1	0	2	0	8
5	MF	(Brazil)	7	Alex Santana	6	0	1	0	0	7
5	MF	(Bulgaria)	64	Dominik Yankov	4	2	1	0	0	7
7	FW	(Netherlands)	10	Elvis Manu	4	1	0	1	0	6
8	FW	(Republic of the Congo)	13	Mavis Tchibota	3	0	1	0	0	4
8	FW	(Argentina)	10	Matías Tissera	2	2	0	0	0	4
8				Own goal	3	0	0	1	0	4
11	DF	(Democratic Republic of the Congo)	22	Jordan Ikoko	3	0	0	0	0	3
11	DF	(Portugal)	32	Josué Sá	3	0	0	0	0	3
11	DF	(Benin)	24	Olivier Verdon	3	0	0	0	0	3
11	MF	(Angola)	23	Show	2	1	0	0	0	3
15	MF	(Bulgaria)	90	Spas Delev	2	0	0	0	0	2
15	FW	(Spain)	9	Higinio Marín	0	2	0	0	0	2
17	FW	(Romania)	29	Dorin Rotariu	1	0	0	0	0	1
17	MF	(Bulgaria)	88	Wanderson	1	0	0	0	0	1
17	FW	(Brazil)	9	Thiago	1	0	0	0	0	1
17	DF	(Bulgaria)	4	Cicinho	1	0	0	0	0	1
17	DF	(Bulgaria)	3	Anton Nedyalkov	0	0	0	1	0	1
17	DF	(Ukraine)	30	Ihor Plastun	0	0	0	0	1	1
TOTALS					75	11	4	10	3	103

=== Clean sheets ===
Place	Position	Nation	Number	Name	A Group	Bulgarian Cup	Supercup	Champions League	Europa League	Total
1	GK	(Netherlands)	1	Sergio Padt	8	0	0	0	1	9
1	GK	(Croatia)	71	Kristijan Kahlina	4	1	1	3	0	9
3	GK	(Croatia)	12	Simon Sluga	1	1	0	0	0	2
TOTALS					13	2	1	3	1	20

=== Disciplinary record ===
Number	Nation	Position	Name	A Group		Bulgarian Cup		Supercup		Champions League		Europa League		Total	
Number	Nation	Position	Name	Yellow card	Red card	Yellow card	Red card	Yellow card	Red card	Yellow card	Red card	Yellow card	Red card	Yellow card	Red card
3	(Bulgaria)	DF	Anton Nedyalkov	0	0	2	1	1	0	1	0	0	0	4	1
4	(Bulgaria)	DF	Cicinho	7	0	0	0	0	0	0	0	4	1	11	1
5	(Bulgaria)	DF	Georgi Terziev	3	0	0	0	0	0	0	0	0	0	3	0
6	(Suriname)	DF	Shaquille Pinas	3	0	0	0	0	0	0	0	0	0	3	0
7	(Brazil)	MF	Alex Santana	5	0	0	0	1	0	0	0	2	0	8	0
8	(Portugal)	MF	Claude Gonçalves	6	0	1	0	0	0	1	0	1	0	9	0
10	(Argentina)	FW	Matías Tissera	0	0	1	0	0	0	0	0	0	0	1	0
11	(Bulgaria)	FW	Kiril Despodov	4	0	1	0	0	0	3	0	1	0	9	0
19	(Cyprus)	FW	Pieros Sotiriou	7	0	1	0	0	0	1	0	1	0	10	0
21	(Slovenia)	DF	Žan Karničnik	1	0	0	0	0	0	0	0	0	0	1	0
22	(Democratic Republic of the Congo)	DF	Jordan Ikoko	1	0	0	0	1	0	0	0	0	0	2	0
23	(Angola)	MF	Show	4	0	1	0	0	0	0	0	1	0	6	0
24	(Benin)	DF	Olivier Verdon	5	1	0	0	0	0	1	0	0	0	6	1
30	(Ukraine)	DF	Ihor Plastun	4	0	2	1	0	0	1	0	1	0	8	1
37	(Ghana)	FW	Bernard Tekpetey	6	0	0	0	0	0	3	0	1	0	10	0
64	(Bulgaria)	MF	Dominik Yankov	1	0	0	0	0	0	1	0	0	0	2	0
73	(Brazil)	MF	Rick	2	0	2	0	0	0	0	0	0	0	4	0
90	(Bulgaria)	MF	Spas Delev	2	0	1	0	0	0	0	0	0	0	3	0
95	(Brazil)	MF	Cauly	1	0	0	0	0	0	1	0	0	0	2	0
Players away on loan:
9	(Spain)	FW	Higinio Marín	1	0	0	0	0	0	0	0	0	0	1	0
32	(Portugal)	DF	Josué Sá	1	0	0	0	0	0	0	0	1	0	2	0
Players who left Ludogorets Razgrad during the season:
10	(Netherlands)	FW	Elvis Manu	2	0	0	0	0	0	0	0	0	0	2	0
13	(Republic of the Congo)	FW	Mavis Tchibota	4	0	1	0	1	0	0	0	0	0	6	0
25	(Senegal)	MF	Stéphane Badji	1	0	0	0	0	0	2	0	1	0	4	0
			TOTALS	71	1	13	2	4	0	15	0	14	1	117	4
