= 2020–21 PFC Ludogorets Razgrad season =

Ludogorets Razgrad
2020–21 season
- Chairman: Aleksandar Aleksandrov
- Manager: Pavel Vrba (until 26 October); Stanislav Genchev (interim) (26 October - 3 January); Valdas Dambrauskas (from 3 January)
- First League: Champions
- Bulgarian Cup: Semi-finals
- Supercup: Runners-up
- Champions League: Second qualifying round
- Europa League: Group stage
- Top goalscorer: League: Claudiu Keșerü (18); All: Claudiu Keșerü (20)
Home colours	Away colours	Third colours

The 2020–21 season was Ludogorets Razgrad's tenth consecutive season in the Bulgarian First League, of which they were defending champions.

== Season events ==
On 21 July, midfielder Serkan Yusein joined CSKA 1948 on loan for the season.

On 23 July, Ludogorets announced the signing of Alex Santana from Botafogo, with Rafael Forster heading in the opposite direction.

On 24 July, Beroe Stara Zagora announced the signing of Dimo Bakalov from Ludogorets.

On 30 July, Bernard Tekpetey joined Ludogorets on loan from Schalke 04 for two seasons.

On 12 August, Ludogorets announced the signing of Higinio Marín from Numancia.

On 16 August, Ludogorets announced the signing of Elvis Manu from Beijing Renhe.

At the draw for the Third qualifying round of the 2020–21 UEFA Europa League, Ludogorets were given a bye to the Play-off Round after a draw of lots between the teams dropping into the Europa League after elimination in the 2020–21 UEFA Champions League.

On 4 September, Olivier Verdon joined Ludogorets on loan for the season from Alavés.

On 2 October, Ludogorets announced the signing of Josué Sá from Anderlecht.

On 5 October, Kiril Despodov joined on loan from Cagliari for the duration of the season.

On 26 October, manager Pavel Vrba resigned from his position, with Stanislav Genchev being appointed as interim-manager in his place.

On 12 November, Jorginho was loaned to Wadi Degla until July 2021, with an option to make the move permanent.

On 3 January, Valdas Dambrauskas was announced as Ludogorets Razgrad's new Head Coach.

On 2 February, Júnior Brandão joined Rio Ave on loan until the end of the season.

On 5 February, Ludogorets Razgrad announced the signing of Pieros Sotiriou from Astana.

On 1 March, Ludogorets Razgrad announced the signing of Kristijan Kahlina on loan from HNK Gorica.

== Squad ==
As of match played 26 May 2021

No.	Name	Nationality	Position	Date of birth (age)	Signed from	Signed in	Contract ends	Apps.	Goals
Goalkeepers
1	Kristijan Kahlina	(Croatia)	GK	24 July 1992 (aged 28)	loan from HNK Gorica	2021	2021	11	0
23	Plamen Iliev	(Bulgaria)	GK	30 November 1991 (aged 29)	Astra Giurgiu	2019		58	0
27	Vladislav Stoyanov	(Bulgaria)	GK	8 June 1987 (aged 33)	Sheriff Tiraspol	2013		139	0
67	Damyan Hristov	(Bulgaria)	GK	11 October 2002 (aged 18)	Youth Team	2020		1	0
69	Damyan Damyanov	(Bulgaria)	GK	29 July 2000 (aged 20)	Youth Team	2016		1	0
Defenders
3	Anton Nedyalkov	(Bulgaria)	DF	30 April 1993 (aged 28)	FC Dallas	2018		122	1
4	Cicinho	(Bulgaria)	DF	26 December 1988 (aged 32)	Santos	2015		181	4
5	Georgi Terziev	(Bulgaria)	DF	18 April 1992 (aged 29)	Chernomorets Burgas	2013		172	5
21	Dragoș Grigore	(Romania)	DF	7 September 1986 (aged 34)	Al-Sailiya	2018		59	5
22	Jordan Ikoko	(Democratic Republic of the Congo)	DF	3 February 1994 (aged 27)	Guingamp	2019		56	2
24	Olivier Verdon	(Benin)	DF	5 October 1995 (aged 25)	loan from Alavés	2020	2021	29	0
30	Cosmin Moți	(Romania)	DF	3 December 1984 (aged 36)	Dinamo București	2012		297	36
32	Josué Sá	(Portugal)	DF	17 June 1992 (aged 28)	Anderlecht	2020		19	2
52	Tihomir Dimitrov	(Bulgaria)	DF	4 February 2000 (aged 21)	Youth Team	2018		1	0
58	Dimitar Iliev	(Bulgaria)	DF	22 June 1999 (aged 21)	Youth Team	2017		1	0
75	Petar Georgiev	(Bulgaria)	DF	10 May 2002 (aged 19)	Youth Team	2020		1	0
91	Aleksandar Ganchev	(Bulgaria)	DF	9 July 2001 (aged 19)	Youth Team	2020		1	0
Midfielders
7	Alex Santana	(Brazil)	MF	13 May 1995 (aged 26)	Botafogo	2020		34	5
12	Anicet Abel	(Madagascar)	MF	13 March 1990 (aged 31)	Botev Plovdiv	2014		226	16
18	Svetoslav Dyakov	(Bulgaria)	MF	31 May 1984 (aged 36)	Lokomotiv Sofia	2012		351	11
25	Stéphane Badji	(Senegal)	MF	29 May 1990 (aged 30)	Bursaspor	2019		68	0
31	Georgi Valchev	(Bulgaria)	MF	5 February 2000 (aged 21)	Youth Team	2018		0	0
37	Branimir Kostadinov	(Bulgaria)	MF	4 March 1989 (aged 32)	Dunav Ruse	2019		1	0
50	Tsvetoslav Petrov	(Bulgaria)	MF	30 May 1999 (aged 21)	Youth Team	2019		2	0
51	Ilker Budinov	(Bulgaria)	MF	11 August 2000 (aged 20)	Youth Team	2019		3	0
64	Dominik Yankov	(Bulgaria)	MF	13 July 2000 (aged 20)	Sunderland	2017		47	5
72	Erol Dost	(Bulgaria)	MF	30 May 1999 (aged 21)	Youth Team	2017		3	1
76	Serdar Yusufov	(Bulgaria)	MF	2 October 1998 (aged 22)	Youth Team	2018		0	0
82	Ivan Yordanov	(Bulgaria)	MF	7 November 2000 (aged 20)	Youth Team	2019		8	0
83	Valenin Tsvetanov	(Bulgaria)	MF	8 April 2002 (aged 19)	Youth Team	2020		1	0
85	Aleks Lukanov	(Bulgaria)	MF	22 February 2002 (aged 19)	Youth Team	2020		1	0
88	Wanderson	(Bulgaria)	MF	2 January 1988 (aged 33)	Portuguesa	2014		253	69
95	Cauly	(Brazil)	MF	15 September 1995 (aged 25)	SC Paderborn	2020		55	12
97	Georgi Chukalov	(Bulgaria)	MF	25 February 1998 (aged 23)	OFC Pomorie	2020		1	0
Forwards
9	Higinio Marín	(Spain)	FW	19 October 1993 (aged 27)	Numancia	2020		12	7
10	Elvis Manu	(Netherlands)	FW	13 August 1993 (aged 27)	Beijing Renhe	2020		32	10
11	Kiril Despodov	(Bulgaria)	FW	11 November 1996 (aged 24)	loan from Cagliari	2020	2021	27	6
13	Mavis Tchibota	(Republic of the Congo)	FW	7 May 1996 (aged 25)	Bnei Yehuda Tel Aviv	2019		68	19
19	Pieros Sotiriou	(Cyprus)	FW	13 January 1993 (aged 28)	Astana	2021		12	2
28	Claudiu Keșerü	(Romania)	FW	2 December 1986 (aged 34)	Al-Gharafa	2015		239	139
37	Bernard Tekpetey	(Ghana)	FW	3 September 1997 (aged 23)	loan from Schalke 04	2020	2022	36	4
38	Vladislav Naydenov	(Bulgaria)	FW	29 November 2001 (aged 19)	Youth Team	2019		1	0
74	Hyusein Kelyovluev	(Bulgaria)	FW	11 May 2000 (aged 21)	Youth Team	2019		1	0
Players away on loan
8	Dan Biton	(Israel)	MF	20 July 1995 (aged 25)	Ashdod	2019		35	6
10	Jakub Świerczok	(Poland)	FW	28 December 1992 (aged 28)	Zagłębie Lubin	2017		87	37
17	Jorginho	(Guinea-Bissau)	MF	21 September 1995 (aged 25)	Saint-Étienne	2019		41	8
20	Serkan Yusein	(Bulgaria)	MF	31 March 1996 (aged 25)	Botev Plovdiv	2019		12	0
81	Dimitar Mitkov	(Bulgaria)	FW	27 January 2000 (aged 21)	Youth Team	2020		8	0
98	Svetoslav Kovachev	(Bulgaria)	MF	14 March 1998 (aged 23)	Youth Team	2015		13	2
	Júnior Brandão	(Brazil)	FW	7 January 1995 (aged 26)	Atlético Goianiense	2018		2	0
Players who left during the season
6	Taleb Tawatha	(Israel)	DF	21 June 1992 (aged 28)	Eintracht Frankfurt	2019		9	0
33	Renan	(Brazil)	GK	18 May 1989 (aged 32)	Avaí	2017		89	0

=== Out on loan ===
Note: Flags indicate national team as defined under FIFA eligibility rules; some limited exceptions apply. Players may hold more than one non-FIFA nationality.

No.	Pos.	Nation	Player
8	MF	ISR	Dan Biton (at Maccabi Tel Aviv)
10	FW	POL	Jakub Świerczok (at Piast Gliwice)
17	MF	GBS	Jorginho (at Wadi Degla)
20	MF	BUL	Serkan Yusein (at CSKA 1948)

No.	Pos.	Nation	Player
81	FW	BUL	Dimitar Mitkov (at CSKA 1948)
98	MF	BUL	Svetoslav Kovachev (at Arda)
—	FW	BRA	Júnior Brandão (at Rio Ave)

== Transfers ==
=== In ===
Date	Position	Nationality	Name	From	Fee	Ref.
23 July 2020	MF	(Brazil)	Alex Santana	Botafogo	Undisclosed	
12 August 2020	FW	(Spain)	Higinio Marín	Numancia	Undisclosed	
16 August 2020	FW	(Netherlands)	Elvis Manu	Beijing Renhe	Undisclosed	
2 October 2020	DF	(Portugal)	Josué Sá	Anderlecht	Undisclosed	
5 February 2021	FW	(Cyprus)	Pieros Sotiriou	Astana	Undisclosed	

=== Loans in ===
Start date	Position	Nationality	Name	From	End date	Ref.
30 July 2020	FW	(Ghana)	Bernard Tekpetey	Schalke 04	30 June 2022	
4 September 2020	DF	(Guinea-Bissau)	Olivier Verdon	Alavés	30 June 2021	
5 October 2020	FW	(Bulgaria)	Kiril Despodov	Cagliari	30 June 2021	
1 March 2021	GK	(Croatia)	Kristijan Kahlina	HNK Gorica	30 June 2021	

=== Out ===
Date	Position	Nationality	Name	To	Fee	Ref.
23 July 2020	DF	(Brazil)	Rafael Forster	Botafogo	Undisclosed	
24 July 2020	MF	(Bulgaria)	Dimo Bakalov	Beroe Stara Zagora	Undisclosed	
16 October 2020	DF	(Israel)	Taleb Tawatha	Maccabi Haifa	Undisclosed	

=== Loans out ===
Start date	Position	Nationality	Name	To	End date	Ref.
20 February 2020	FW	(Brazil)	Júnior Brandão	Atlético Goianiense	31 December 2020	
21 July 2020	MF	(Bulgaria)	Serkan Yusein	CSKA 1948	End of season	
1 August 2020	MF	(Bulgaria)	Svetoslav Kovachev	Arda Kardzhali	30 June 2021	
16 August 2020	MF	(Israel)	Dan Biton	Maccabi Tel Aviv	30 June 2021	
17 August 2020	FW	(Poland)	Jakub Świerczok	Piast Gliwice	30 June 2021	
12 November 2020	MF	(Guinea-Bissau)	Jorginho	Wadi Degla	31 July 2021	
2 February 2021	FW	(Brazil)	Júnior Brandão	Rio Ave	30 June 2021	
12 February 2021	FW	(Bulgaria)	Dimitar Mitkov	CSKA 1948	30 June 2021	

=== Released ===
Date	Position	Nationality	Name	Joined	Date	Ref.
28 February 2021	GK	(Brazil)	Renan			

== Friendlies ==
25 July 2020	Ludogorets Razgrad	0–0	Montana	Razgrad
15:00 EEST (UTC+3)		Report		Stadium: Ludogorets Sports Center; Referee: Ivelin Zanev

20 January 2021	Ludogorets Razgrad (Bulgaria)	2–1	(Serbia) Bačka Topola	Belek, Turkey
17:00 EET (UTC+2)	Tekpetey 7', 36'; Terziev (yellow card) 55'; Yankov (yellow card) 70'	Report	Stanojev 37'	Stadium: Rixos Premium Stadium; Attendance: 0

23 January 2021	Ludogorets Razgrad (Bulgaria)	2–2	(Ukraine) Shakhtar Donetsk	Belek, Turkey
16:00 EET (UTC+2)	Ikoko 58'; Cauly 60'	Report	Solomon 5'; Konoplyanka 55'; Marlos (yellow card)	Stadium: Calista Sports Center; Attendance: 0

30 January 2021	Ludogorets Razgrad (Bulgaria)	2–1	(Ukraine) Dynamo Kyiv	Belek, Turkey
16:15 EET (UTC+2)	Cauly 39'; Sá 56'	Report	Verdon 24' (o.g.)	Stadium: Mardan Stadium; Attendance: 0

31 January 2021	Ludogorets Razgrad (Bulgaria)	1–2	(Russia) Akron Tolyatti	Belek, Turkey
16:30 EET (UTC+2)	Cicinho (yellow card) 26'; Ikoko (yellow card) 50'; Yankov 73'	Report	Kvekveskiri 24'; Emini (yellow card) 53'; Gazdanov 75'	Stadium: Arkadia Complex Stadium; Attendance: 0

4 February 2021	Ludogorets Razgrad (Bulgaria)	3–1	(Georgia (country)) Dinamo Tbilisi	Belek, Turkey
16:00 EET (UTC+2)	Despodov 24' (yellow card) 68'; Keșerü 31'; Santana (yellow card) 37'; Tekpetey (yellow card) 64'; Tchibota 76'	Report	Marušić 2'; Hvadiagi (yellow card) 34'; Lominadze (yellow card) 35'	Stadium: Titanic Deluxe Stadium; Attendance: 0

== Competitions ==
=== Bulgarian Supercup ===
2 August 2020	Ludogorets Razgrad	0–1	Lokomotiv Plovdiv	Razgrad
20:30 EEST (UTC+3)	Tchibota (yellow card) 61'; Ikoko (red card) 66'; Grigore (yellow card) 72'	Report	Petrović (yellow card) 25'; Masoero (yellow card) 64'; Aralica (yellow card) 73'; Iliev 89' (yellow card) 90'; Salinas (yellow card) 90'	Stadium: Huvepharma Arena; Attendance: 0 Referee: Volen Chinkov

=== A Football Group ===
==== Regular stage ====
===== Table =====
Pos	Team	Pld	W	D	L	GF	GA	GD	Pts	Qualification
1	Ludogorets Razgrad	26	20	4	2	59	18	+41	64	Qualification for the Championship group
2	Lokomotiv Plovdiv	26	15	7	4	41	19	+22	52	Qualification for the Championship group
3	CSKA Sofia	26	14	8	4	39	20	+19	50	Qualification for the Championship group
4	Arda	26	12	9	5	36	29	+7	45	Qualification for the Championship group
5	CSKA 1948	26	10	8	8	34	30	+4	38	Qualification for the Championship group

Source: Soccerway, Bulgarian Football
Rules for classification: 1) Points; 2) Head-to-head points; 3) Head-to-head goal difference; 4) Head-to-head goals scored; 5) Head-to-head away goals scored (only if two teams); 6) Goal difference; 7) Goals scored; 8) Fairplay ranking; 9) Draw.

===== Results summary =====
Overall								Home						Away					
Pld	W	D	L	GF	GA	GD	Pts	W	D	L	GF	GA	GD	W	D	L	GF	GA	GD
26	20	4	2	59	18	+41	64	12	1	0	28	4	+24	8	3	2	31	14	+17

Last updated: 26 April 2021.
Source: See Results

===== Results by round =====
Game	1	2	3	4	5	6	7	8	9	10	11	12	13	14	15	16	17	18	19	20	21	22	23	24	25	26
Ground	A	H	A	A	H	A	H	H	A	H	A	A	A	H	A	H	H	A	H	A	H	A	H	A	H	A
Result	L	W	W	W	W	D	W	D	W	W	W	W	W	W	D	W	W	L	W	W	W	D	W	W	W	W
Position	11	8	3	2	1	2	1	2	2	1	1	1	1	1	1	1	1	1	1	1	1	1	1	1	1	1

Source: See Results
A = Away; H = Home; W = Win; D = Draw; L = Loss

===== Results =====
8 August 2020 1	Botev Vratsa	3–1	Ludogorets Razgrad	Vratsa
20:00 EEST (UTC+3)	Burov (yellow card) 23'; Domovchiyski (yellow card) 31', (goal) 42'; Genov 47'; Kerchev (yellow card) 63'; Atanasov 84'	Report	Dyakov (yellow card) 11' (yellow-red card) 33'; Cauly (yellow card) 56', (goal) 90+4' (pen.)	Stadium: Stadion Hristo Botev; Referee: Nikola Popov

14 August 2020 2	Ludogorets Razgrad	3–0	Slavia Sofia	Razgrad
20:00 EEST (UTC+3)	Cicinho 44'; Badji (yellow card) 59'; Tchibota 73'; Moți 79' (pen.), (yellow card) 88'	Report	Gamakov (yellow card) 46'; Hristov (yellow card) 87'	Stadium: Huvepharma Arena; Referee: Dragomir Draganov

22 August 2020 3	Cherno More	1–4	Ludogorets Razgrad	Varna
21:00 EEST (UTC+3)	Coureur 25'; Panayotov (yellow card) 29'; Andrade (yellow card) 71'	Report	Santana 6'; Cicinho (yellow card) 10'; Moți (yellow card) 30'; Keșerü 40'; Grigore (yellow card) 42'; Jorginho 73'; Higinio 88'	Stadium: Stadion Ticha; Referee: Nikolay Yordanov

29 August 2020 4	Etar	0–2	Ludogorets Razgrad	Veliko Tarnovo
21:15 EEST (UTC+3)	Borukov (yellow card) 38'; M. Ivanov (yellow card) 83'	Report	Moți (yellow card) 42'; Keșerü 79'; Tchibota 90'	Stadium: Stadion Ivaylo; Referee: Volen Chinkov

12 September 2020 5	Ludogorets Razgrad	3–1	Lokomotiv Plovdiv	Razgrad
21:00 EEST (UTC+3)	Santana (yellow card) 59' (goal) 79'; Yankov 62'; Manu 81'	Report	Tsvetanov (yellow card) 19'; Masoero (yellow card) 31'; Aralica (yellow card) 34'; Karagaren 52'; Ilić (yellow card) 76'; Almeida (yellow card) 81'	Stadium: Huvepharma Arena; Referee: Georgi Davidov

20 September 2020 6	CSKA Sofia	2–2	Ludogorets Razgrad	Sofia
20:30 EEST (UTC+3)	Keita (yellow card) 27' (goal) 71'; Yomov (yellow card) 58'; Sankharé 75'; Carey (yellow card) 80'	Report	Santana 11' (yellow card) 81'; Grigore (yellow card) 23'; Cicinho (yellow card) 34'; Yankov (yellow card) 63'; Manu (yellow card) 63'; Higinio 84'; Stoyanov (yellow card) 89'	Stadium: Stadion Balgarska Armia; Referee: Georgi Kabakov

26 September 2020 7	Ludogorets Razgrad	2–0	Beroe	Razgrad
18:45 EEST (UTC+3)	Keșerü 18'; Cicinho 23'	Report	Vasilev (yellow card) 30'; Mézague (yellow card) 74'; Bakalov (yellow card) 79'	Stadium: Huvepharma Arena; Referee: Ivaylo Stoyanov

16 October 2020 9	Ludogorets Razgrad	1–1	Tsarsko Selo	Razgrad
19:15 EEST (UTC+3)	Higinio 28' (pen.); Moți (yellow card) 43'; Tekpetey (yellow card) 45+2'; Cauly (yellow card) 63'; Dyakov (yellow card) 65'; Keșerü (penalty missed) 83'; Santana (yellow card) 90+1'	Report	Bandalovski (yellow card) 27'; Daskalov (yellow card) 71'; Baltanov 90+4'; Hristov (yellow card) 90+5'	Stadium: Huvepharma Arena; Referee: Georgi Nikolov

25 October 2020 10	Montana	1–3	Ludogorets Razgrad	Montana
20:15 EET (UTC+2)	Tasev 2'; Bari (yellow card) 27'; Iliev (yellow card) 35'; Bashliev (yellow card) 54'	Report	Higinio 10'; Manu 52'; Nedyalkov (yellow card) 64'; Yankov 86'	Stadium: Stadion Ogosta; Referee: Nikolay Yordanov

1 November 2020 11	Ludogorets Razgrad	1–0	Levski Sofia	Razgrad
19:15 EET (UTC+2)	Sá (yellow card) 41'; Santana (yellow card) 77'; Cauly 84'; Dyakov (yellow card) 86'	Report	Raynov (yellow card) 34'; Robertha (yellow card) 85'; Bojinov (yellow card) 85'	Stadium: Huvepharma Arena; Referee: Volen Chinkov

8 November 2020 12	CSKA 1948	0–3	Ludogorets Razgrad	Sofia
17:30 EET (UTC+2)		Report	Nedyalkov (yellow card) 38'; Keșerü 45', 77'; Tchibota 65'	Stadium: Natsionalen stadion Vasil Levski; Referee: Stanislav Todorov

29 November 2020 14	Ludogorets Razgrad	2–1	Botev Vratsa	Razgrad
14:00 EET (UTC+2)	Kerchev 16' (o.g.); Sá 31'; Ikoko (yellow card) 79'	Report	Lagoa 20'; Kostadinov (yellow card) 88'	Stadium: Huvepharma Arena; Referee: Nikolay Yordanov

6 December 2020 15	Slavia Sofia	0–2	Ludogorets Razgrad	Sofia
16:45 EET (UTC+2)	Patev (yellow card) 7'; Tasevski (yellow card) 79'	Report	Verdon (yellow card) 55'; Keșerü 65'; Sá (yellow card) 70'; Santana 82'	Stadium: Stadion Slavia; Referee: Dragomir Draganov

13 December 2020 16	Ludogorets Razgrad	1–0	Cherno More	Razgrad
17:45 EET (UTC+2)	Yankov (yellow card) 8'; Keșerü 17' (yellow card) 38'; Grigore (yellow card) 36'; Despodov (yellow card) 39'; Sá (yellow card) 42'; Tchibota (yellow card) 90'; Stoyanov (yellow card) 90+1'	Report	Panov (yellow card) 13'; Panayotov (yellow card) 31'; Rodrigo (yellow card) 77'; Velev (yellow card) 79'	Stadium: Huvepharma Arena; Referee: Ivaylo Stoyanov

17 December 2020 8	Arda	2–2	Ludogorets Razgrad	Kardzhali
17:30 EET (UTC+2)	Delev 17'; Lozev (yellow card) 51'; Kotev (yellow card) 67'; Juninho 84'	Report	Despodov 11'; Grigore 70'; Keșerü (yellow card) 73'; Sá (yellow card) 90+6'	Stadium: Arena Arda; Referee: Georgi Davidov
Note: Match originally scheduled for 4 October 2020.

20 December 2020 13	Ludogorets Razgrad	2–1	Botev Plovdiv	Razgrad
14:00 EET (UTC+2)	Badji (yellow card) 30'; Keșerü 39' (pen.); Yankov 50'; Verdon (yellow card) 75'	Report	Tonev (yellow card) 29'; Trifonov (yellow card) 34'; Genev (yellow card) 38'; Cissé 89'; Rusev (yellow card) 90+4'	Stadium: Huvepharma Arena; Referee: Nikolay Yordanov
Note: Match originally scheduled for 21 November 2020.

15 February 2021 17	Ludogorets Razgrad	6–0	Etar	Razgrad
16:00 EET (UTC+2)	Keșerü 6', 36', 41', 51'; Krachunov 39' (o.g.); Terziev (yellow card) 64'; Cicinho (yellow card) 83'; Cauly 90+2'	Report	H. Ivanov (red card) 24'; Stanev (yellow card) 84'	Stadium: Huvepharma Arena; Referee: Georgi Kabakov

20 February 2021 18	Lokomotiv Plovdiv	3–2	Ludogorets Razgrad	Plovdiv
15:00 EET (UTC+2)	Tsvetanov 41'; Iliev 43'; Gomis (yellow card) 52'; Salinas 77'	Report	Abel 17'; Tekpetey (yellow card) 29'; Keșerü 53' (pen.); Sotiriou (yellow card) 72'; Cauly (yellow card) 76'; Despodov (yellow card) 78'; Badji (yellow card) 84'	Stadium: Stadion Lokomotiv; Referee: Volen Chinkov

27 February 2021 19	Ludogorets Razgrad	1–0	CSKA Sofia	Razgrad
15:00 EET (UTC+2)	Tekpetey 4'; Abel (yellow card) 40'; Ikoko (yellow card) 73'; P. Iliev (yellow card) 90+1'	Report	Zanev (yellow card) 17'; Sinclair (yellow card) 66'; Koch (yellow card) 86'; Mattheij (yellow card) 87'; Youga (yellow card) 90+4'	Stadium: Huvepharma Arena; Referee: Dragomir Draganov

7 March 2021 20	Beroe	1–4	Ludogorets Razgrad	Stara Zagora
14:30 EET (UTC+2)	Minchev (yellow card) 6' (goal) 52'; Octávio (yellow card) 74'; Furtado (yellow card) 79'	Report	Keșerü 3'; Manu 61', 82'; Cicinho (yellow card) 71'; Despodov 89'	Stadium: Stadion Beroe; Referee: Georgi Davidov

12 March 2021 21	Ludogorets Razgrad	1–0	Arda	Razgrad
17:00 EET (UTC+2)	Abel (yellow card) 69'; Wanderson 90+5'	Report	Martinov (yellow card) 77'; Georgiev (yellow card) 83' (yellow-red card) 90'; Karadzhov (yellow card) 90+6'	Stadium: Huvepharma Arena; Referee: Ivaylo Stoyanov

20 March 2021 22	Tsarsko Selo	1–1	Ludogorets Razgrad	Sofia
17:30 EET (UTC+2)	Kavdanski (yellow card) 29' (goal) 79'; Anderson (yellow card) 83'; Penev (yellow card) 84'	Report	Sá (yellow card) 35'; Sotiriou 77'; Tekpetey (yellow card) 90+2'	Stadium: Sporten kompleks Tsarsko Selo; Referee: Stanislav Todorov

10 April 2021 23	Ludogorets Razgrad	1–0	Montana	Razgrad
17:30 EEST (UTC+3)	Keșerü 73' (pen.)	Report	Tsonkov (yellow card) 56'	Stadium: Huvepharma Arena; Referee: Georgi Ginchev

18 April 2021 24	Levski Sofia	0–3	Ludogorets Razgrad	Sofia
20:45 EEST (UTC+3)		Report	Keșerü 8'; Cauly 11', 77'; Cicinho (yellow card) 76'; Wanderson (yellow card) 80'; Nedyalkov (yellow card) 90+1'	Stadium: Vivacom Arena - Georgi Asparuhov; Referee: Valentin Zhelezov

22 April 2021 25	Ludogorets Razgrad	4–0	CSKA 1948	Razgrad
19:00 EEST (UTC+3)	Sá 35'; Despodov 40', 61' (yellow card) 61'; Cicinho 45'	Report	Lyaskov (yellow card) 89'	Stadium: Huvepharma Arena; Referee: Stanislav Todorov

26 April 2021 26	Botev Plovdiv	0–2	Ludogorets Razgrad	Plovdiv
20:15 EEST (UTC+3)	Marquinhos (yellow card) 6'; Rabeï (yellow card) 17'; Mladenovski (yellow card) 42'	Report	Wanderson 66', 82'	Stadium: Futbolen kompleks Botev 1912; Referee: Georgi Davidov

==== Championship stage ====
===== Table =====
Pos	Team	Pld	W	D	L	GF	GA	GD	Pts	Qualification
1	Ludogorets Razgrad (C)	31	22	4	5	69	29	+40	70	Qualification for the Champions League first qualifying round
2	Lokomotiv Plovdiv	31	17	10	4	48	23	+25	61	Qualification for the Europa Conference League second qualifying round (Note: CSKA Sofia qualified for the Europa Conference League second qualifying round by winning the 2020–21 Bulgarian Cup.)
3	CSKA Sofia	31	17	8	6	46	24	+22	59	Qualification for the Europa Conference League second qualifying round
4	Arda (O)	31	13	11	7	42	37	+5	50	Qualification for the Europa Conference League play-off
5	CSKA 1948	31	12	11	8	41	34	+7	47	
6	Beroe	31	10	9	12	42	38	+4	39	

Source: Soccerway
Rules for classification: 1) Points; 2) Head-to-head points; 3) Head-to-head goal difference; 4) Head-to-head goals scored; 5) Head-to-head away goals scored (only if two teams); 6) Goal difference; 7) Goals scored; 8) Fairplay ranking; 9) Draw.
(C) Champions; (O) Play-off winners

===== Results summary =====
Overall								Home						Away					
Pld	W	D	L	GF	GA	GD	Pts	W	D	L	GF	GA	GD	W	D	L	GF	GA	GD
5	2	0	3	10	11	−1	6	2	0	1	8	4	+4	0	0	2	2	7	−5

Last updated: 26 May 2021.
Source: See Results

===== Results by round =====
Game	1	2	3	4	5
Ground	H	H	A	H	A
Result	W	L	L	W	L
Position	1	1	1	1	1

Source: See Results
A = Away; H = Home; W = Win; D = Draw; L = Loss

===== Results =====
4 May 2021 27	Ludogorets Razgrad	3–1	Beroe	Razgrad
19:45 EEST (UTC+3)	Despodov 27'; Verdon (yellow card) 37'; Yankov 80'; Keșerü 84'	Report	Makouta 38' (pen.) (yellow card) 45+5'	Stadium: Huvepharma Arena; Referee: Dragomir Draganov

8 May 2021 28	Ludogorets Razgrad	1–2	Lokomotiv Plovdiv	Razgrad
17:45 EEST (UTC+3)	Manu (yellow card) 8' (yellow-red card) 61'; Tekpetey 15' (yellow card) 53'; Cauly (yellow card) 74' (yellow-red card) 81'; Despodov (yellow card) 76'; Ikoko (yellow card) 84'	Report	Minchev 17' (yellow card) 63'; Iliev 32' (pen.); Karagaren (yellow card) 70'; Salinas (yellow card) 80'; Gomis (yellow card) 84'; Almeida (yellow card) 90+5'	Stadium: Huvepharma Arena; Referee: Ivaylo Stoyanov

12 May 2021 29	CSKA Sofia	4–1	Ludogorets Razgrad	Sofia
19:30 EEST (UTC+3)	Mattheij 4' (yellow card) 90+2'; Bismark 54'; Koch 62'; Mazikou (yellow card) 89'; Caicedo 90+7' (pen.)	Report	Badji (yellow card) 50'; Cicinho 59'; Tekpetey (yellow card) 61'; Dambrauskas (yellow card) 69'; Despodov (yellow card) 70'; Tchibota (yellow card) 90+1' (yellow-red card) 90+3'	Stadium: Stadion Balgarska Armia; Referee: Georgi Kabakov

15 May 2021 30	Ludogorets Razgrad	4–1	Arda	Razgrad
17:30 EEST (UTC+3)	Yankov 38'; Taravel 45' (o.g.); Santana 57'; Cicinho (yellow card) 59'; Cauly 87'	Report	Yordanov 37'	Stadium: Huvepharma Arena; Referee: Ivo Andreev

26 May 2021 31	CSKA 1948	3–1	Ludogorets Razgrad	Sofia
20:00 EEST (UTC+3)	Chochev 2'; Ivanov 15', 78'; N.Ganchev (yellow card) 85'	Report	Yankov (yellow card) 26'; Keșerü 74'	Stadium: Vasil Levski National Stadium; Referee: Volen Chinkov

=== Bulgarian Cup ===
11 February 2021 Round of 32	Sportist Svoge	1–3	Ludogorets Razgrad	Razgrad
14:00 EET (UTC+2)	Hristov 48'; V. Ivanov (yellow card) 68'; Stoychev (yellow card) 74'; Kochilov (yellow card) 84'	Report	Tekpetey 17', 57'; Keșerü 60'; Sá (yellow card) 66'; Badji (yellow card) 70'; Dyakov (yellow card) 88'	Stadium: Huvepharma Arena; Referee: Ivelin Zanev
Note: Match original scheduled for 12 November 2020, but postponed on 10 November 2020, due to an outbreak of COVID-19 cases within the Ludogorets squad. Match played at Ludogorets' Huvepharma Arena in Razgrad instead of Sportist Svoge's regular Stadion Chavdar Tsvetkov in Svoge.

3 March 2021 Round of 16	Tsarsko Selo	1–2	Ludogorets Razgrad	Sofia
15:00 EET (UTC+2)	Nganioni (yellow card) 25'; Mertens 59'; Kavdanski (yellow card) 90+2'	Report	Tchibota 33'; Abel 45+2' (yellow card) 71'; Manu (yellow card) 62'; Terziev (yellow card) 73'; Ikoko (yellow card) 89'	Stadium: Sporten kompleks Tsarsko Selo; Referee: Nikola Popov

16 March 2021 Quarterfinal	Ludogorets Razgrad	2–1 (a.e.t.)	Lokomotiv Plovdiv	Razgrad
18:00 EET (UTC+2)	Grigore (yellow card) 17'; Sotiriou 47'; Tchibota 114'	Report	Nikolaev (yellow card) 3'; Masoero (yellow card) 81'; Minchev 90+3'	Stadium: Huvepharma Arena; Referee: Dragomir Draganov

7 April 2021 Semifinal 1st leg	CSKA Sofia	1–1	Ludogorets Razgrad	Sofia
19:30 EEST (UTC+3)	Turitsov (yellow card) 36'; Geferson (yellow card) 71'; Rodrigues 77'	Report	Tekpetey (yellow card) 15' (yellow-red card) 60'; Cicinho (yellow card) 69'; Cauly 83'	Stadium: Stadion Balgarska Armia; Referee: Volen Chinkov

14 April 2021 Semifinal 2nd leg	Ludogorets Razgrad	1–2 (2–3 agg.)	CSKA Sofia	Razgrad
18:30 EEST (UTC+3)	Verdon (yellow card) 24'; Ikoko (yellow card) 42'; Nedyalkov (yellow card) 52'; Manu 72' (yellow card) 90+4'; Santana (red card) 85'; Grigore (yellow card) 90+5'	Report	Henrique 4' (yellow card) 40'; Rodrigues (yellow card) 23'; Yomov 36'; Mattheij (yellow card) 62'; Youga (yellow card) 71'; Turitsov (yellow card) 73' (yellow-red card) 86'; Mazikou (yellow card) 83'; Charles (yellow card) 84'; Busatto (yellow card) 90'	Stadium: Huvepharma Arena; Attendance: 0 Referee: Georgi Kabakov

=== UEFA Champions League ===
==== Qualifying rounds ====
19 August 2020 1QR	Budućnost Podgorica (Montenegro)	1–3	(Bulgaria) Ludogorets Razgrad	Podgorica, Montenegro
21:00 EEST (UTC+3)	Ćuković (yellow card) 8', (goal) 31'; Ivanović (yellow card) 68'	Report	Higinio 12'; Tchibota 25', (yellow card) 65'; Cicinho (yellow card) 56'; Renan (yellow card) 61'; Badji (yellow card) 69'; Tekpetey (yellow card) 79'; Cauly 90+3'	Stadium: Podgorica City Stadium; Attendance: 0 Referee: Ferenc Karakó (Hungary)
Note: Match played behind closed doors.

26 August 2020 2QR	Ludogorets Razgrad (Bulgaria)	0–1	(Denmark) Midtjylland	Razgrad, Bulgaria
20:30 EEST (UTC+3)	Abel (yellow card) 45'; Higinio (yellow card) 81'; Moți (yellow card) 85'	Report	Kraev (yellow card) 7'; Onyeka (yellow card) 42'; Paulinho (yellow card) 62'; Brumado 78'	Stadium: Huvepharma Arena; Attendance: 0 Referee: Denys Shurman (Ukraine)
Note: Match played behind closed doors.

=== UEFA Europa League ===
==== Qualifying rounds ====
24 September 2020 3QR	Ludogorets Razgrad (Bulgaria)	Bye
Note: Ludogorets given a bye to the Play-off round by a draw of lots.

1 October 2020 PO	Dynamo Brest (Belarus)	0–2	(Bulgaria) Ludogorets Razgrad	Brest, Belarus
21:00 EEST (UTC+3)	Sedko (yellow card) 64'; Tweh (yellow card) 81'; Krivets (yellow card) 90+3'	Report	Manu 73'; Higinio 79'	Stadium: Regional Sport Complex Brestsky; Attendance: 0 Referee: Slavko Vinčić (Slovenia)
Note: Match played behind closed doors.

==== Group stage ====
Pos	Team	Pld	W	D	L	GF	GA	GD	Pts	Qualification
1	(England) Tottenham Hotspur	6	4	1	1	15	5	+10	13	Advance to knockout phase
2	(Belgium) Antwerp	6	4	0	2	8	5	+3	12	Advance to knockout phase
3	(Austria) LASK	6	3	1	2	11	12	−1	10	
4	(Bulgaria) Ludogorets Razgrad	6	0	0	6	7	19	−12	0	

Source: UEFA
Rules for classification: Group stage tiebreakers

22 October 2020 1	Ludogorets Razgrad (Bulgaria)	1–2	(Belgium) Royal Antwerp	Razgrad, Bulgaria
22:00 EEST (UTC+3)	Higinio 46'; Cicinho (yellow card) 88'; Verdon (yellow card) 90+2'	Report	Gerkens 63'; Refaelov 70'; Juklerød (yellow card) 73'; Haroun (yellow card) 80'	Stadium: Huvepharma Arena; Attendance: 2,321; Referee: Roi Reinshreiber (Israel)

29 October 2020 2	LASK (Austria)	4–3	(Bulgaria) Ludogorets Razgrad	Linz, Austria
19:55 EET (UTC+2)	Balić 2', 56'; Gruber 12'; Wiesinger (yellow card) 17'; Grgic (yellow card) 27' (yellow-red card) 73'; Michorl (yellow card) 47'; Raguž 35'	Report	Moți (yellow card) 10'; Manu 15', 67', 74' (pen.); Tekpetey (yellow card) 43'; Badji (yellow card) 45'	Stadium: Linzer Stadion; Attendance: 1,487; Referee: Xavier Estrada Fernández (Spain)

5 November 2020 3	Ludogorets Razgrad (Bulgaria)	1–3	(England) Tottenham Hotspur	Razgrad, Bulgaria
19:55 EET (UTC+2)	Anicet (yellow card) 15'; Keșerü 50'	Report	Kane 13'; Moura 33'; Lo Celso 62'; Doherty (yellow card) 79'	Stadium: Huvepharma Arena; Referee: Fran Jović (Croatia)

26 November 2020 4	Tottenham Hotspur (England)	4–0	(Bulgaria) Ludogorets Razgrad	London, England
22:00 EET (UTC+2)	Vinícius 16', 34' Ndombele (yellow card) 52' Winks 63' Moura 73' Højbjerg (yellow card) 90+4'	Report	Keșerü (yellow card) 6'; Despodov (yellow card) 43'	Stadium: Tottenham Hotspur Stadium; Referee: Giorgi Kruashvili (Georgia)

3 December 2020 5	Royal Antwerp (Belgium)	3–1	(Bulgaria) Ludogorets Razgrad	Antwerp, Belgium
19:55 EET (UTC+2)	Hongla 19'; De Laet 72'; Benson 87'	Report	Despodov 53'; Grigore (yellow card) 62' (yellow-red card) 90+1'; Nedyalkov (yellow card) 71'; Santana (yellow card) 90+2'; Manu (yellow card) 90+4'	Stadium: Bosuilstadion; Referee: Pavel Orel (Czech Republic)

10 December 2020 6	Ludogorets Razgrad (Bulgaria)	1–3	(Austria) LASK	Razgrad, Bulgaria
22:00 EET (UTC+2)	Cicinho (yellow card) 44'; Manu 46'; Santana (red card) 61'	Report	Goiginger (penalty missed) 45'; Wiesinger (yellow card) 54' (goal) 56'; Renner 61' (pen.); Balić (yellow card) 63'; Madsen 67'; Ramsebner (yellow card) 90+1'	Stadium: Huvepharma Arena; Referee: Vitali Meshkov (Russia)

== Squad statistics ==
As of match played 26 May 2021

=== Appearances and goals ===
No.	Pos	Nat	Player	Total		A Group		Bulgarian Cup		Super Cup		Champions League		Europa League	
No.	Pos	Nat	Player	Apps	Goals	Apps	Goals	Apps	Goals	Apps	Goals	Apps	Goals	Apps	Goals
1	GK	(Croatia) CRO	Kristijan Kahlina	12	0	9	0	3	0	0	0	0	0	0	0
3	DF	(Bulgaria) BUL	Anton Nedyalkov	33	0	20+2	0	3	0	0	0	2	0	6	0
4	DF	(Bulgaria) BUL	Cicinho	32	4	22+1	4	2+1	0	0	0	2	0	4	0
5	DF	(Bulgaria) BUL	Georgi Terziev	23	0	11+4	0	2+1	0	1	0	0	0	2+2	0
7	MF	(Brazil) BRA	Alex Santana	35	5	17+6	5	3	0	1	0	2	0	4+2	0
9	FW	(Spain) ESP	Higinio Marín	12	7	4+4	4	0	0	0	0	1+1	1	1+1	2
10	FW	(Netherlands) NED	Elvis Manu	32	10	9+13	4	2+2	1	0	0	0	0	2+4	5
11	FW	(Bulgaria) BUL	Kiril Despodov	28	6	18+2	5	2+2	0	0	0	0	0	4	1
12	MF	(Madagascar) MAD	Anicet Abel	33	2	12+9	1	4	1	1	0	1	0	4+2	0
13	FW	(Republic of the Congo) CGO	Mavis Tchibota	28	6	7+10	3	1+2	2	1	0	2	1	2+3	0
18	MF	(Bulgaria) BUL	Svetoslav Dyakov	22	0	12+8	0	1	0	0+1	0	0	0	0	0
19	FW	(Cyprus) CYP	Pieros Sotiriou	13	2	0+9	1	3+1	1	0	0	0	0	0	0
21	DF	(Romania) ROU	Dragoș Grigore	18	1	9+1	1	3	0	1	0	2	0	2	0
22	DF	(Democratic Republic of the Congo) COD	Jordan Ikoko	29	0	12+6	0	4	0	1	0	0	0	4+2	0
23	GK	(Bulgaria) BUL	Plamen Iliev	16	0	9	0	1	0	0	0	0	0	6	0
24	DF	(Benin) BEN	Olivier Verdon	30	0	18+1	0	4	0	0	0	0	0	7	0
25	MF	(Senegal) SEN	Stéphane Badji	31	0	13+6	0	2+1	0	0	0	2	0	7	0
27	GK	(Bulgaria) BUL	Vladislav Stoyanov	7	0	5+1	0	0	0	0	0	0	0	1	0
28	FW	(Romania) ROU	Claudiu Keșerü	39	20	22+5	18	2+1	1	0+1	0	1+1	0	5+1	1
30	DF	(Romania) ROU	Cosmin Moți	16	1	8+1	1	0+1	0	0+1	0	2	0	3	0
32	DF	(Portugal) POR	Josué Sá	20	2	17	2	2	0	0	0	0	0	1	0
34	MF	(Bulgaria) BUL	Branimir Kostadinov	1	0	1	0	0	0	0	0	0	0	0	0
37	FW	(Ghana) GHA	Bernard Tekpetey	37	4	17+8	2	3	2	0	0	1+1	0	2+5	0
38	FW	(Bulgaria) BUL	Vladislav Naydenov	1	0	0+1	0	0	0	0	0	0	0	0	0
50	FW	(Bulgaria) BUL	Tsvetoslav Petrov	1	0	1	0	0	0	0	0	0	0	0	0
51	MF	(Bulgaria) BUL	Ilker Budinov	1	0	1	0	0	0	0	0	0	0	0	0
52	DF	(Bulgaria) BUL	Tihomir Dimitrov	1	0	1	0	0	0	0	0	0	0	0	0
64	MF	(Bulgaria) BUL	Dominik Yankov	39	5	16+12	5	1+2	0	0+1	0	0+1	0	5+1	0
67	GK	(Bulgaria) BUL	Damyan Hristov	1	0	1	0	0	0	0	0	0	0	0	0
74	FW	(Bulgaria) BUL	Hyusein Kelyovluev	1	0	1	0	0	0	0	0	0	0	0	0
75	DF	(Bulgaria) BUL	Petar Georgiev	1	0	0+1	0	0	0	0	0	0	0	0	0
82	MF	(Bulgaria) BUL	Ivan Yordanov	5	0	2+1	0	0	0	0	0	0	0	0+2	0
83	MF	(Bulgaria) BUL	Valenin Tsvetanov	1	0	0+1	0	0	0	0	0	0	0	0	0
85	MF	(Bulgaria) BUL	Aleks Lukanov	1	0	0+1	0	0	0	0	0	0	0	0	0
88	MF	(Bulgaria) BUL	Wanderson	12	3	5+3	3	3+1	0	0	0	0	0	0	0
91	DF	(Bulgaria) BUL	Aleksandar Ganchev	1	0	1	0	0	0	0	0	0	0	0	0
95	MF	(Brazil) BRA	Cauly	42	8	25+2	6	3+2	1	1	0	2	1	5+2	0
97	MF	(Bulgaria) BUL	Georgi Chukalov	1	0	0+1	0	0	0	0	0	0	0	0	0
Players away from the club on loan:
8	MF	(Israel) ISR	Dan Biton	1	0	0	0	0	0	1	0	0	0	0	0
10	FW	(Poland) POL	Jakub Świerczok	1	0	1	0	0	0	0	0	0	0	0	0
17	MF	(Guinea-Bissau) GBS	Jorginho	11	0	3+5	0	0	0	1	0	0+2	0	0	0
81	FW	(Bulgaria) BUL	Dimitar Mitkov	8	0	2+3	0	0	0	0	0	0	0	0+3	0
Players who appeared for Ludogorets Razgrad that left during the season:
6	DF	(Israel) ISR	Taleb Tawatha	2	0	1	0	0	0	1	0	0	0	0	0
33	GK	(Brazil) BRA	Renan	11	0	7	0	1	0	1	0	2	0	0	0

=== Goal scorers ===
Place	Position	Nation	Number	Name	A Group	Bulgarian Cup	Supercup	Champions League	Europa League	Total
1	FW	(Romania)	28	Claudiu Keșerü	18	1	0	0	1	20
2	FW	(Netherlands)	10	Elvis Manu	4	1	0	0	5	10
3	MF	(Brazil)	95	Cauly	6	1	0	1	0	8
4	FW	(Spain)	9	Higinio Marín	4	0	0	1	2	7
5	FW	(Bulgaria)	11	Kiril Despodov	5	0	0	0	1	6
5	FW	(Republic of the Congo)	13	Mavis Tchibota	3	2	0	1	0	6
7	MF	(Brazil)	7	Alex Santana	5	0	0	0	0	5
7	MF	(Bulgaria)	64	Dominik Yankov	5	0	0	0	0	5
9	DF	(Bulgaria)	4	Cicinho	4	0	0	0	0	4
9	FW	(Ghana)	37	Bernard Tekpetey	2	2	0	0	0	4
11	MF	(Bulgaria)	88	Wanderson	3	0	0	0	0	3
11				Own goal	3	0	0	0	0	3
13	DF	(Portugal)	32	Josué Sá	2	0	0	0	0	2
13	MF	(Madagascar)	12	Anicet Abel	1	1	0	0	0	2
13	FW	(Cyprus)	19	Pieros Sotiriou	1	1	0	0	0	2
16	DF	(Romania)	30	Cosmin Moți	1	0	0	0	0	1
16	MF	(Guinea-Bissau)	17	Jorginho	1	0	0	0	0	1
16	DF	(Romania)	21	Dragoș Grigore	1	0	0	0	0	1
TOTALS					65	9	0	3	9	86

=== Clean sheets ===
Place	Position	Nation	Number	Name	A Group	Bulgarian Cup	Supercup	Champions League	Europa League	Total
1	GK	(Bulgaria)	23	Plamen Iliev	5	0	0	0	1	6
2	GK	(Croatia)	1	Kristijan Kahlina	4	0	0	0	0	4
3	GK	(Brazil)	33	Renan	3	0	0	0	0	3
4	GK	(Bulgaria)	27	Vladislav Stoyanov	2	0	0	0	0	2
TOTALS					14	0	0	0	1	15

=== Disciplinary record ===
Number	Nation	Position	Name	A Group		Bulgarian Cup		Supercup		Champions League		Europa League		Total	
Number	Nation	Position	Name	Yellow card	Red card	Yellow card	Red card	Yellow card	Red card	Yellow card	Red card	Yellow card	Red card	Yellow card	Red card
3	(Bulgaria)	DF	Anton Nedyalkov	3	0	1	0	0	0	0	0	1	0	5	0
4	(Bulgaria)	DF	Cicinho	6	0	1	0	0	0	1	0	2	0	10	0
5	(Bulgaria)	DF	Georgi Terziev	1	0	1	0	0	0	0	0	0	0	2	0
7	(Brazil)	MF	Alex Santana	4	0	0	1	0	0	0	0	1	1	5	2
9	(Spain)	FW	Higinio Marín	0	0	0	0	0	0	1	0	0	0	1	0
10	(Netherlands)	FW	Elvis Manu	3	1	2	0	0	0	0	0	0	0	5	1
11	(Bulgaria)	FW	Kiril Despodov	5	0	0	0	0	0	0	0	1	0	6	0
12	(Madagascar)	MF	Anicet Abel	2	0	1	0	0	0	1	0	1	0	5	0
13	(Republic of the Congo)	FW	Mavis Tchibota	3	1	0	0	1	0	1	0	0	0	5	1
18	(Bulgaria)	MF	Svetoslav Dyakov	4	1	1	0	0	0	0	0	0	0	5	1
19	(Cyprus)	FW	Pieros Sotiriou	1	0	0	0	0	0	0	0	0	0	1	0
21	(Romania)	DF	Dragoș Grigore	3	0	2	0	1	0	0	0	2	1	8	1
22	(Democratic Republic of the Congo)	DF	Jordan Ikoko	3	0	2	0	0	1	0	0	0	0	5	1
23	(Bulgaria)	GK	Plamen Iliev	1	0	0	0	0	0	0	0	0	0	1	0
24	(Benin)	DF	Olivier Verdon	4	0	1	0	0	0	0	0	1	0	6	0
25	(Senegal)	MF	Stéphane Badji	4	0	1	0	0	0	1	0	1	0	7	0
27	(Bulgaria)	GK	Vladislav Stoyanov	2	0	0	0	0	0	0	0	0	0	2	0
28	(Romania)	FW	Claudiu Keșerü	2	0	0	0	0	0	0	0	1	0	3	0
30	(Romania)	DF	Cosmin Moți	4	0	0	0	0	0	1	0	1	0	6	0
32	(Portugal)	DF	Josué Sá	5	0	1	0	0	0	0	0	0	0	6	0
37	(Ghana)	FW	Bernard Tekpetey	5	0	2	1	0	0	1	0	1	0	9	1
64	(Bulgaria)	MF	Dominik Yankov	3	0	0	0	0	0	0	0	0	0	3	0
88	(Bulgaria)	MF	Wanderson	1	0	0	0	0	0	0	0	0	0	1	0
95	(Brazil)	MF	Cauly	5	1	0	0	0	0	0	0	1	0	6	1
Players away on loan:
Players who left Ludogorets Razgrad during the season:
33	(Brazil)	GK	Renan	0	0	0	0	0	0	1	0	0	0	1	0
			TOTALS	74	4	16	2	2	1	8	0	14	2	114	9
