= Josué Sá =

Portuguese footballer

Personal information
- Full name: Josué Humberto Gonçalves Leal de Sá
- Date of birth: 17 June 1992 (age 34)
- Place of birth: Lisbon, Portugal
- Height: 1.87 m (6 ft 2 in)
- Position: Centre-back

Team information
- Current team: Lusitânia
- Number: 3

Youth career
- 2000–2009: Sporting CP
- 2009–2011: Vitória Guimarães

Senior career*
Years	Team	Apps	(Gls)
2011−2017	Vitória Guimarães	97	(5)
2011−2012	→ Chaves (loan)	23	(1)
2012−2014	Vitória Guimarães B	48	(2)
2017−2020	Anderlecht	22	(0)
2018−2019	→ Kasımpaşa (loan)	17	(1)
2019−2020	→ Huesca (loan)	26	(1)
2020−2022	Ludogorets Razgrad	27	(5)
2022	→ Maccabi Tel Aviv (loan)	6	(0)
2022–2024	Rio Ave	42	(0)
2024–2025	Gil Vicente	18	(1)
2025–	Lusitânia	25	(1)

International career
2010	Portugal U18	5	(0)
2011−2012	Portugal U19	12	(0)
2012	Portugal U20	5	(0)
2013	Portugal U21	6	(0)
- * Club domestic league appearances and goals as of 20:45, 28 May 2026 (UTC)

Josué Humberto Gonçalves Leal de Sá (born 17 June 1992) is a Portuguese professional footballer who plays as a central defender for Liga Portugal 2 club Lusitânia.

He made over 150 Primeira Liga appearances for Vitória de Guimarães, Rio Ave and Gil Vicente. He also had spells in five foreign countries.

Sá represented Portugal at youth level.

== Club career ==
=== Vitória Guimarães ===
Born in Lisbon, Sá spent nine of his formative years with local Sporting CP, signing with Vitória S.C. at the age of 17. He started his senior career in 2011, being loaned by the latter to third division club G.D. Chaves.

Subsequently returned to Guimarães, Sá initially alternated between the first team and the recently created reserve side in the Segunda Liga. His first appearance in the Primeira Liga with the former was on 20 January 2013, when he came on as a late substitute in a 3−1 away win against Rio Ave FC.

Sá scored his first goal in the Portuguese top tier on 7 November 2014, in a 2−1 away victory over F.C. Arouca. He added another one during the season from 26 appearances, helping to an eventual fifth-place finish and qualification for the UEFA Europa League.

On 6 May 2016, Sá renewed his contract until 2019, with the release clause being improved from €3 to 8 million.

=== Anderlecht ===
Sá joined R.S.C. Anderlecht on 31 August 2017, agreeing to a four-year deal. He made his Belgian Pro League debut on 1 October, playing the entire 1–0 home win over Standard Liège.

Sá spent the following two seasons on loan, to Turkish Süper Lig's Kasımpaşa S.K. and SD Huesca of the Spanish Segunda División. On 22 December 2019, he scored the winner for the latter in a 2–1 home defeat of Aragonese rivals Real Zaragoza, en route to promotion as champions.

=== Later career ===
On 2 October 2020, Sá joined PFC Ludogorets Razgrad of the First Professional Football League on a three-year contract. After winning the league in his first season, he was voted Player of the Month in August 2021, having scored twice. He moved to his fifth foreign country the following 2 February, joining Maccabi Tel Aviv F.C. of the Israeli Premier League on loan for the rest of the campaign.

Sá returned to his country's top flight on 26 August 2022, signing a two-year deal with the option of a third at newly promoted Rio Ave. In July 2024, he joined Gil Vicente F.C. in the same league. He scored his only goal for the latter on 19 January 2025, from close range following a corner kick to help the hosts beat FC Porto 3–1 in the domestic league.

On 22 September 2025, aged 33, the free agent Sá moved to second-tier club Lusitânia F.C. on a two-year contract. He all but missed his second season due to an anterior cruciate ligament injury.

== International career ==
Across four youth levels, Sá won 28 caps for Portugal. His first for the under-21s arrived on 25 March 2013, in a 2−1 friendly defeat of the Republic of Ireland held in Dundalk.

== Career statistics ==
As of match played 1 December 2021

Appearances and goals by club, season and competition
Club	Season	League			National Cup		League Cup		Other		Total	
Club	Season	Division	Apps	Goals	Apps	Goals	Apps	Goals	Apps	Goals	Apps	Goals
Chaves (loan)	2011–12	Segunda Divisão	23	1	0	0	0	0	–		23	1
Vitória Guimarães B	2012–13	Segunda Liga	31	1	–		–		–		31	1
Vitória Guimarães B	2013–14	Campeonato Nacional	9	1	–		–		–		9	1
Vitória Guimarães B	2014–15	Segunda Liga	8	0	–		–		–		8	0
Vitória Guimarães B	Total		48	2	–		–		–		48	2
Vitória Guimarães	2012–13	Primeira Liga	3	0	0	0	0	0	–		3	0
Vitória Guimarães	2013–14	Primeira Liga	4	0	0	0	1	0	1 (Note: Appearance in Supertaça Cândido de Oliveira)	0	6	0
Vitória Guimarães	2014–15	Primeira Liga	26	2	1	0	1	0	–		28	2
Vitória Guimarães	2015–16	Primeira Liga	31	2	0	0	1	0	0	0	32	2
Vitória Guimarães	2016–17	Primeira Liga	30	1	5	0	1	0	–		36	1
Vitória Guimarães	2017–18	Primeira Liga	3	0	0	0	0	0	1	0	4	0
Vitória Guimarães	Total		97	5	6	0	4	0	2	0	109	5
Anderlecht	2017–18	Belgian Pro League	22	0	1	0	–		3 (Note: Appearances in UEFA Champions League)	0	26	0
Kasımpaşa (loan)	2018–19	Süper Lig	17	1	5	0	—		0	0	22	1
Huesca (loan)	2019–20	Segunda División	26	1	4	0	—		—		30	1
Ludogorets	2020–21	First League	17	2	3	0	—		1 (Note: Appearance in UEFA Europa League)	0	21	2
Ludogorets	2021–22	First League	10	3	0	0	—		5 (Note: Two appearances in UEFA Champions League, three appearances in UEFA Europa League)	0	15	3
Ludogorets	Total		27	5	3	0	0	0	6	0	36	5
Career total			260	15	19	0	4	0	11	0	294	15

== Honours ==
Huesca

- Segunda División: 2019–20

Ludogorets Razgrad

- First Professional Football League (Bulgaria): 2020–21, 2021–22

Individual

- First Professional Football League (Bulgaria) Goal of the Week: 2021–22
