= Dimitar Mitkov =

Bulgarian footballer

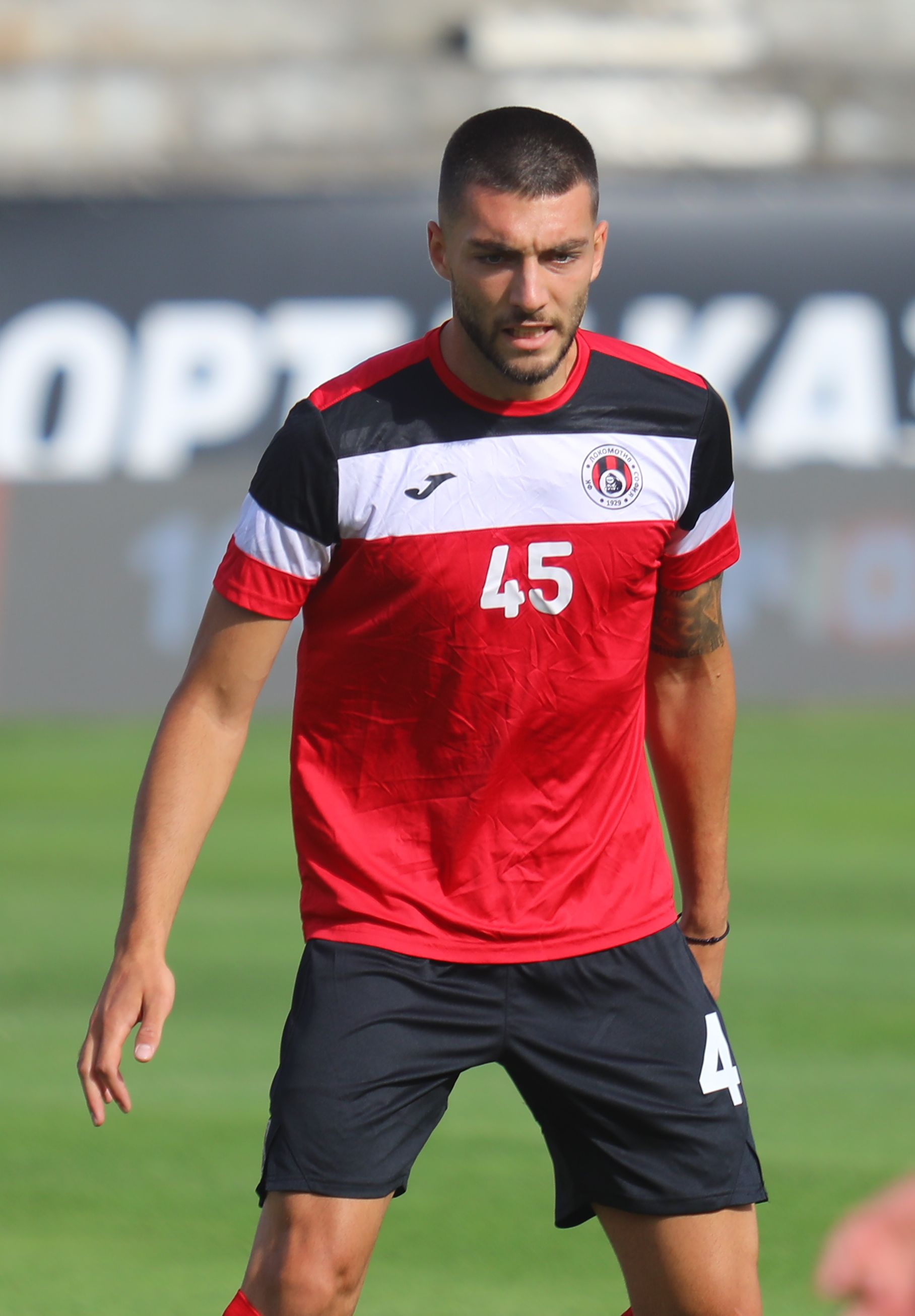

Personal information
- Full name: Dimitar Georgiev Mitkov
- Date of birth: 27 January 2000 (age 26)
- Place of birth: Varna, Bulgaria
- Height: 1.86 m (6 ft 1 in)
- Position: Forward

Team information
- Current team: Madura United
- Number: 9

Youth career
- Spartak Varna
- –2015: Ludogorets Razgrad
- 2015–2016: Botev Plovdiv
- 2016–2020: Ludogorets Razgrad

Senior career*
Years	Team	Apps	(Gls)
2018–2022	Ludogorets Razgrad II	64	(32)
2020–2022	Ludogorets Razgrad	5	(0)
2021	→ CSKA 1948 (loan)	11	(0)
2022–2024	Lokomotiv Sofia	62	(14)
2023	→ Rubin Kazan (loan)	11	(0)
2024	Istiklol	9	(2)
2025	Spartak Varna	16	(3)
2025–2026	Botev Plovdiv	12	(3)
2026	Ordabasy	10	(1)
2026–	Madura United	5	(5)

International career^{‡}
2020–2021	Bulgaria U21	4	(0)
- * Club domestic league appearances and goals as of 22 October 2026 ‡ National team caps and goals as of 14 June 2021

Dimitar Georgiev Mitkov (Bulgarian: Димитър Георгиев Митков; born 27 January 2000) is a Bulgarian footballer who plays as a forward for Super League club Madura United.

== Career ==
Mitkov started his career in his local Spartak Varna, before moving to Ludogorets Razgrad. In 2015, he joined Botev Plovdiv Academy, before rejoining again Ludogorets after one season. Mitkov made his professional debut for the first team on 14 August 2020 in a league match against Slavia Sofia.

On 12 January 2021 he joined the fellow First League team CSKA 1948 on loan for the rest of the season.

On 16 February 2023, Mitkov moved to Rubin Kazan in the Russian First League on loan until the end of the season. Mitkov left Rubin on 6 June 2023.

=== Istiklol ===
On 3 August 2024, Tajikistan Higher League club Istiklol announced the signing of Mitkov on a contract until the end of the 2024 season.

== International career ==
Mitkov received his first call up for the Bulgaria U21 team in November 2020 for the 2021 European Under-21 Championship qualifying match against Estonia U21, but was recalled 2 days before the match due to positive COVID-19 test.

== Career statistics ==
=== Club ===
As of match played 12 September 2026

Club	Season	League			National Cup		Continental		Other		Total	
Club	Season	Division	Apps	Goals	Apps	Goals	Apps	Goals	Apps	Goals	Apps	Goals
Ludogorets Razgrad II	2017–18	Second League	3	0	-		-		-		3	0
Ludogorets Razgrad II	2018–19	Second League	17	2	-		-		-		17	2
Ludogorets Razgrad II	2019–20	Second League	20	10	-		-		-		20	10
Ludogorets Razgrad II	2020–21	Second League	12	15	-		-		-		12	15
Ludogorets Razgrad II	2021–22	Second League	12	5	-		-		-		12	5
Ludogorets Razgrad II	Total		64	32	0	0	0	0	0	0	64	32
Ludogorets Razgrad	2020–21	First League	5	0	0	0	3 (Note: Zero appearances and goals in the UEFA Champions League, three appearances and zero goals in the UEFA Europa League.)	0	0 (Note: Appearances and goals in the Bulgarian Supercup)	0	8	0
Ludogorets Razgrad	2021–22	First League	0	0	2	0	2 (Note: Zero appearances and goals in the UEFA Champions League, Two appearances and zero goals in the UEFA Europa League.)	0	0	0	4	0
Ludogorets Razgrad	Total		5	0	2	0	5	0	0	0	12	0
CSKA 1948 Sofia (loan)	2020–21	First League	11	0	2	1	-		-		13	1
Lokomotiv 1929 Sofia	2021–22	First League	13	2	0	0	-		-		13	2
Lokomotiv 1929 Sofia	2021–22	First League	17	7	0	0	-		-		17	7
Lokomotiv 1929 Sofia	2021–22	First League	32	5	2	1	-		-		34	6
Lokomotiv 1929 Sofia	Total		62	14	2	1	0	0	0	0	64	15
Rubin Kazan (loan)	2022–23	Russian First League	11	0	2	1	-		-		13	1
Istiklol	2024	Tajikistan Higher League	9	2	5	1	4 (Note: Appearances and goals in the AFC Champions League Two)	0	0 (Note: Appearances and goals in the Tajik Supercup)	0	18	3
Spartak Varna	2024–25	First League	16	3	-		-		-		16	3
Botev Plovdiv	2025–26	First League	3	1	0	0	-		-		3	1
Madura United	2026–27	Super League	2	4	0	0	0	0	0	0	2	4
Career total			184	56	13	4	9	0	0	0	205	60
