= Alex Santana =

Brazilian footballer (born 1995)

Personal information
- Full name: Alex Paulo Menezes Santana
- Date of birth: 13 May 1995 (age 31)
- Place of birth: Morungaba, Brazil
- Height: 1.84 m (6 ft 1/2 in)
- Position: Midfielder

Team information
- Current team: Corinthians
- Number: 88

Youth career
- 2010–2012: Paulista
- 2012–2013: Internacional

Senior career*
Years	Team	Apps	(Gls)
2013–2018	Internacional	5	(0)
2016	→ Criciúma (loan)	11	(0)
2016	→ Guarani (loan)	12	(1)
2017-2018	→ Paraná (loan)	42	(6)
2019–2020	Botafogo	40	(9)
2020–2022	Ludogorets Razgrad	46	(12)
2022–2024	Athletico Paranaense	61	(7)
2024–	Corinthians	30	(2)
2025	→ Grêmio (loan)	8	(0)
- * Club domestic league appearances and goals as of 18 November 2026

Alex Paulo Menezes Santana (born 13 May 1995) is a Brazilian professional footballer who plays as a midfielder for Campeonato Brasileiro Série A club Corinthians.

Santana began his professional career at Internacional in 2013, spending time on loan at Criciúma, Guarani and Paraná before moving to Botafogo six years later. He joined Athletico in July 2022.

== Career ==
=== Early career ===
Santana began his professional career at Internacional. He made his debut on 11 October 2013 by replacing Otávio for the final 29 minutes in a 2–1 away loss against Flamengo.

=== Ludogorets ===
On 23 July 2020, Santana signed for Ludogorets Razgrad for a reported fee of €750,000. After signing a contract with the club, he said: "I joined Ludogorets to play in the Champions League.". He scored his debut goal for the Bulgarian champions on 23 August 2020 in a league game against Cherno More Varna. On 14 April 2021, he received his first red card in the 1:2 home loss against CSKA Sofia in a Bulgarian Cup match. During his time with Ludogorets, he established himself as a key member of the team.

== Career statistics ==
As of match played 18 November 2026

Club	Season	League			State league (Note: Includes Campeonato Gaúcho, Campeonato Catarinense, Campeonato Paranaense, Campeonato Carioca, Campeonato Paulista)		National cup (Note: Includes Copa do Brasil, Bulgarian Cup)		Continental		Other		Total	
Club	Season	Division	Apps	Goals	Apps	Goals	Apps	Goals	Apps	Goals	Apps	Goals	Apps	Goals
Internacional	2013	Série A	1	0	—		—		—		—		1	0
Internacional	2014	Série A	—		3	0	—		—		—		3	0
Internacional	2015	Série A	1	0	—		—		—		—		1	0
Internacional	2017	Série A	—		—		—		—		1 (Note: Appearance(s) in Primeira Liga)	0	1	0
Internacional	Total		2	0	3	0	—		—		1	0	6	0
Criciúma (loan)	2016	Série B	—		11	0	—		—		1	0	12	0
Guarani (loan)	2016	Série C	12	1	—		—		—		—		12	1
Paraná (loan)	2017	Série B	1	0	9	2	7	0	—		2	0	19	2
Paraná (loan)	2018	Série A	27	4	5	0	0	0	—		—		32	4
Paraná (loan)	Total		28	4	14	2	7	0	—		2	0	51	6
Botafogo	2019	Série A	24	5	8	3	4	1	6 (Note: Appearances in Copa Sudamericana)	1	—		42	10
Botafogo	2020	Série A	—		8	1	3	0	—		—		11	1
Botafogo	Total		24	5	16	4	7	1	6	1	—		53	11
Ludogorets	2020–21	Bulgarian First League	23	5	—		3	0	8 (Note: Two appearances in UEFA Champions League, six appearances in UEFA Europa League)	0	1 (Note: Appearance in Bulgarian Supercup)	0	35	5
Ludogorets	2021–22	Bulgarian First League	20	6	—		4	0	10 (Note: Seven appearances in UEFA Champions League, three appearances in UEFA Europa League)	0	1	1	35	7
Ludogorets	2022–23	Bulgarian First League	3	1	—		—		4 (Note: Appearances in UEFA Champions League)	1	—		7	2
Ludogorets	Total		46	12	—		8	0	22	1	2	1	77	14
Athletico Paranaense	2022	Série A	13	2	—		—		5 (Note: Appearances in Copa Libertadores)	1	—		18	3
Athletico Paranaense	2023	Série A	21	3	15	1	3	2	5	2	—		44	8
Athletico Paranaense	2024	Série A	4	0	8	1	0	0	6	0	—		18	1
Athletico Paranaense	Total		38	5	23	2	3	2	16	3	—		80	12
Corinthians	2024	Série A	12	0	—		1	0	2	0	—		15	0
Corinthians	2025	Série A	3	0	13	2	1	0	5 (Note: Three appearances in Copa Libertadores, two appearances in Copa Sudamericana)	0	—		22	2
Corinthians	2026	Série A	2	0	—		—		—		—		2	0
Corinthians	Total		17	0	13	2	2	0	7	0	—		39	2
Grêmio (loan)	2025	Série A	8	0	0	0	1	0	1	0	1 (Note: Appearance(s) in Recopa Gaúcha)	0	11	0
Career total			175	27	80	10	28	3	52	5	7	1	341	46

== Honours ==
Internacional

- Campeonato Gaúcho: 2013, 2014, 2015

Ludogorets Razgrad

- Bulgarian First League: 2020–21, 2021–22
- Bulgarian Supercup: 2021

Athletico Paranaense

- Campeonato Paranaense: 2023

Corinthians

- Campeonato Paulista: 2025

Grêmio

- Recopa Gaúcha: 2025

Individual

- Bulgarian First League Goal of the Week: 2021–22 (Week 12) v. Botev Plovdiv
