= Damyan Hristov =

Bulgarian footballer

Personal information
- Full name: Damyan Hristov Hristov
- Date of birth: 10 November 2002 (age 24)
- Place of birth: Yambol, Bulgaria
- Height: 1.88 m (6 ft 2 in)
- Position: Goalkeeper

Team information
- Current team: Cherno More
- Number: 31

Youth career
- Ludogorets Razgrad

Senior career*
Years	Team	Apps	(Gls)
2020–2026	Ludogorets Razgrad II	113	(0)
2021–2026	Ludogorets Razgrad	4	(0)
2023	→ Etar (loan)	0	(0)
2026–	Cherno More	3	(0)

International career^{‡}
2021–2024	Bulgaria U21	17	(0)
- * Club domestic league appearances and goals as of 06:53, 13 October 2026 (UTC) ‡ National team caps and goals as of 10:45, 9 April 2025 (UTC)

Damyan Hristov (Bulgarian: Дамян Христов; born 10 November 2002) is a Bulgarian professional footballer who plays as a goalkeeper for First League club Cherno More Varna.

== Career ==
Hristov completed his league debut for Ludogorets Razgrad on 26 May 2021 in a match against CSKA 1948. In June 2023, he joined Etar Veliko Tarnovo, on loan from Ludogorets.

Hristov left the club after his contract expired at the end of the 2025–26 season. On 22 July 2026, he joined Cherno More Varna as a free agent.

== Career statistics ==
As of match played 26 May 2026

Appearances and goals by club, season and competition
Club	Season	League			National cup		Europe		Other		Total	
Club	Season	Division	Apps	Goals	Apps	Goals	Apps	Goals	Apps	Goals	Apps	Goals
Ludogorets Razgrad II	2020–21	Second League	0	0	—		—		—		0	0
Ludogorets Razgrad II	2021–22	Second League	25	0	—		—		—		25	0
Ludogorets Razgrad II	2022–23	Second League	31	0	—		—		—		31	0
Ludogorets Razgrad II	2023–24	Second League	14	0	—		—		—		14	0
Ludogorets Razgrad II	2024–25	Second League	26	0	—		—		—		26	0
Ludogorets Razgrad II	2025–26	Second League	17	0	—		—		—		17	0
Ludogorets Razgrad II	Total		113	0	—		—		—		113	0
Ludogorets Razgrad	2020–21	First League	1	0	0	0	0	0	0	0	1	0
Ludogorets Razgrad	2021–22	First League	0	0	0	0	0	0	0	0	0	0
Ludogorets Razgrad	2022–23	First League	0	0	0	0	0	0	0	0	0	0
Ludogorets Razgrad	2023–24	First League	2	0	3	0	0	0	0	0	5	0
Ludogorets Razgrad	2024–25	First League	1	0	0	0	0	0	0	0	1	0
Ludogorets Razgrad	2025–26	First League	0	0	1	0	0	0	0	0	1	0
Ludogorets Razgrad	Total		4	0	4	0	0	0	0	0	8	0
Etar Veltiko Tarnovo (loan)	2023–24	First League	0	0	0	0	—		—		0	0
Cherno More	2026–27	First League	0	0	0	0	—		—		0	0
Career total			117	0	4	0	0	0	0	0	121	0
