= Aleks Lukanov =

Bulgarian footballer (b. 2002)

Personal information
- Full name: Aleks Yasenov Lukanov
- Date of birth: 22 February 2002 (age 24)
- Place of birth: Smolyan, Bulgaria
- Height: 1.70 m (5 ft 7 in)
- Position: Midfielder

Team information
- Current team: Ludogorets Razgrad II
- Number: 85

Youth career
- Ludogorets Razgrad

Senior career*
Years	Team	Apps	(Gls)
2020–2022	Ludogorets Razgrad III	18	(0)
2020–	Ludogorets Razgrad II	101	(5)
2021–	Ludogorets Razgrad	2	(0)

International career
2018	Bulgaria U17	1	(0)
- * Club domestic league appearances and goals as of 11:51, 24 March 2026 (UTC)

Aleks Lukanov (Bulgarian: Алекс Луканов; born 22 February 2002) is a Bulgarian footballer who plays as a midfielder for Ludogorets Razgrad II.

== Career ==
Lukanov completed his league debut for Ludogorets Razgrad on 26 May 2021 in a match against CSKA 1948.

== Career statistics ==
As of match played 26 May 2024

Appearances and goals by club, season and competition
Club	Season	League			Cup		Europe		Other		Total	
Club	Season	Division	Apps	Goals	Apps	Goals	Apps	Goals	Apps	Goals	Apps	Goals
Ludogorets Razgrad III	2019–20	Third Amateur League	8	0	—		—		—		8	0
Ludogorets Razgrad III	2020–21	Third Amateur League	7	0	—		—		—		7	0
Ludogorets Razgrad III	2021–22	Third Amateur League	3	0	—		—		—		3	0
Ludogorets Razgrad III	Total		18	0	—		—		—		18	0
Ludogorets Razgrad II	2020–21	Vtora Liga	1	0	—		—		—		1	0
Ludogorets Razgrad II	2021–22	Vtora Liga	22	1	—		—		—		22	1
Ludogorets Razgrad II	2022–23	Vtora Liga	16	1	—		—		—		16	1
Ludogorets Razgrad II	2023–24	Vtora Liga	25	1	—		—		—		25	1
Ludogorets Razgrad II	Total		64	3	—		—		—		64	3
Ludogorets Razgrad	2020–21	Efbet Liga	1	0	0	0	0	0	—		1	0
Ludogorets Razgrad	2023–24	Efbet Liga	1	0	0	0	0	0	—		1	0
Ludogorets Razgrad	Total		2	0	0	0	0	0	—		2	0
Career total			84	3	0	0	0	0	0	0	84	3
