= Aleksandar Ganchev =

Bulgarian footballer

Personal information
- Full name: Aleksandar Plamenov Ganchev
- Date of birth: 9 July 2001 (age 25)
- Place of birth: Sofia, Bulgaria
- Height: 1.85 m (6 ft 1 in)
- Position: Right back

Youth career
- Ludogorets Razgrad

Senior career*
Years	Team	Apps	(Gls)
2019–2023	Ludogorets Razgrad II	80	(2)
2021–2023	Ludogorets Razgrad	1	(0)
2024	FC Wels II	15	(1)
2024–2025	CSKA Sofia II	1	(0)
2025	Chernomorets Burgas	5	(0)

International career
2019	Bulgaria U19	3	(0)
- * Club domestic league appearances and goals as of 12:29, 1 July 2025 (UTC)

Aleksandar Ganchev (Bulgarian: Александър Ганчев; born 9 July 2001) is a Bulgarian footballer who plays as a full back.

== Career ==
Ganchev started his career in his local Ludogorets Razgrad academy. completed his league debut for the club on 26 May 2021 in a match against CSKA 1948.

== Career statistics ==
As of 1 July 2025

Appearances and goals by club, season and competition
Club	Season	League			National cup		Europe		Other		Total	
Club	Season	Division	Apps	Goals	Apps	Goals	Apps	Goals	Apps	Goals	Apps	Goals
Ludogorets Razgrad II	2018–19	Second League	1	0	0	0	–		–		1	0
Ludogorets Razgrad II	2020–21	Second League	20	0	0	0	–		–		20	0
Ludogorets Razgrad II	2021–22	Second League	31	2	0	0	–		–		31	2
Ludogorets Razgrad II	2022–23	Second League	28	0	0	0	–		–		28	0
Ludogorets Razgrad II	Total		80	2	0	0	0	0	0	0	80	2
Ludogorets Razgrad	2020–21	First League	1	0	0	0	0	0	0	0	1	0
Ludogorets Razgrad	2022–23	First League	0	0	0	0	0	0	0	0	0	0
Ludogorets Razgrad	Total		1	0	0	0	0	0	0	0	1	0
FC Wels II	2023–24	OÖ Liga	15	1	0	0	0	0	0	0	15	1
CSKA Sofia II	2024–25	Second League	1	0	–		–		–		1	0
Chernomorets Burgas	2024–25	Third League	5	0	–		–		–		5	0
Career total			102	3	0	0	0	0	0	0	102	3
