= Tihomir Dimitrov =

Bulgarian footballer

Personal information
- Full name: Tihomir Tihomirov Dimitrov
- Date of birth: 4 February 2000 (age 26)
- Place of birth: Sofia, Bulgaria
- Height: 1.80 m (5 ft 11 in)
- Position: Centre back

Team information
- Current team: Yantra Gabrovo
- Number: 24

Youth career
- –2017: Levski Sofia
- 2017–2020: Ludogorets Razgrad

Senior career*
Years	Team	Apps	(Gls)
2017–2023	Ludogorets Razgrad II	110	(6)
2020–2023	Ludogorets Razgrad	2	(0)
2022	→ Spartak Varna (loan)	0	(0)
2023–2024	Sportist Svoge	9	(0)
2024	Castrovillari	9	(1)
2024–2025	Lovech	32	(2)
2025–	Yantra Gabrovo	28	(0)

International career
2021–2022	Bulgaria U21	1	(0)
- * Club domestic league appearances and goals as of 11:15, 29 May 2026 (UTC)

Tihomir Dimitrov (Bulgarian: Тихомир Димитров; born 4 February 2000) is a Bulgarian professional footballer who plays as a centre back for Second League club Yantra Gabrovo.

== Career ==
Dimitrov made his league debut for Ludogorets Razgrad on 26 May 2021 in a match against CSKA 1948. On 6 June 2022, he was sent on loan to the newly promoted First League team Spartak Varna until the end of the season. However, on 23 July 2022 his loan was terminated without him playing a single official game.

== International career ==
On 18 May 2021, he received his first call-up for the Bulgaria U21 team, for friendly matches against Russia U21 and Albania U21 on 3 and 6 June.

== Career statistics ==
=== Club ===
As of 6 May 2022

Club performance			League		Cup		Continental		Other		Total	
Club	League	Season	Apps	Goals	Apps	Goals	Apps	Goals	Apps	Goals	Apps	Goals
Bulgaria			League		Bulgarian Cup		Europe		Other (Note: Includes Bulgarian Supercup matches.)		Total	
Ludogorets Razgrad II	Second League	2017–18	2	0	–		–		–		2	0
Ludogorets Razgrad II	Second League	2019–19	8	0	–		–		–		8	0
Ludogorets Razgrad II	Second League	2019–20	16	1	–		–		–		16	1
Ludogorets Razgrad II	Second League	2020–21	25	1	–		–		–		25	1
Ludogorets Razgrad II	Second League	2021–22	34	2	–		–		–		34	2
Ludogorets Razgrad II	Total		85	4	0	0	0	0	0	0	85	4
Ludogorets Razgrad	First League	2019–20	0	0	0	0	0	0	0	0	0	0
Ludogorets Razgrad	First League	2020–21	1	0	0	0	0	0	0	0	1	0
Ludogorets Razgrad	First League	2021–22	1	0	2	0	0	0	0	0	3	0
Ludogorets Razgrad	Total		2	0	2	0	0	0	0	0	4	0
Career statistics			87	4	2	0	0	0	0	0	89	4
