= Christian Gomis (footballer, born 1998) =

Senegalese footballer (born 1998)

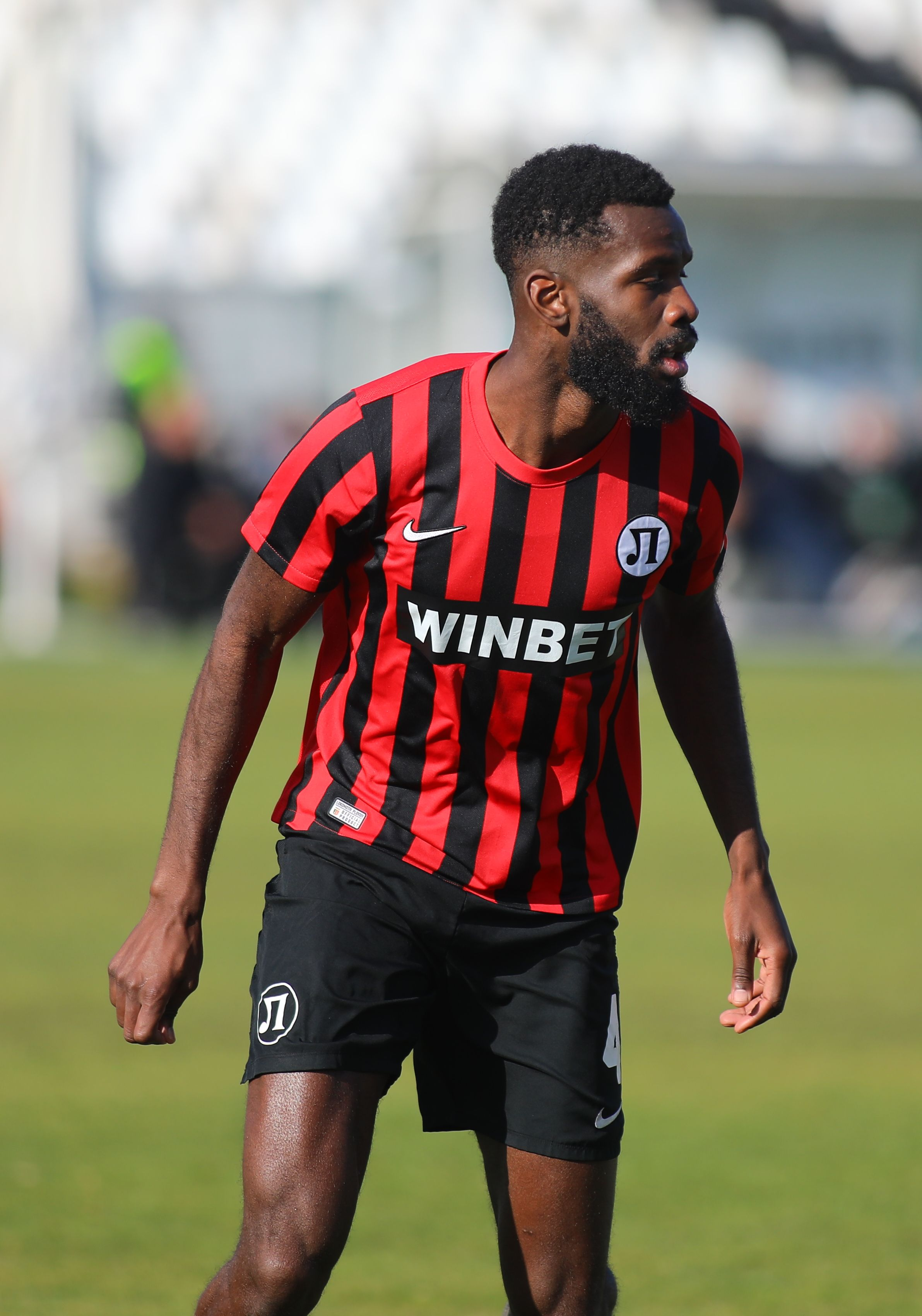

Personal information
- Date of birth: 25 August 1998 (age 28)
- Place of birth: Dakar, Senegal
- Height: 2.02 m (6 ft 8 in)
- Positions: Centre-back; defensive midfielder

Team information
- Current team: Java United
- Number: 6

Youth career
- 2016–2017: Paris Saint-Germain

Senior career*
Years	Team	Apps	(Gls)
2017–2018	Pacy Ménilles	7	(0)
2018	ASD Cordenons	14	(0)
2019	ÉF Bastia	11	(1)
2019–2020	Paris Saint-Germain B	0	(0)
2020–2022	Lokomotiv Plovdiv	49	(1)
2022–2023	Budapest Honvéd	26	(0)
2023–2024	Mezőkövesd	17	(0)
2024–2025	BG Pathum United	28	(2)
2025–2026	Uthai Thani	29	(0)
2026–	Java United	2	(0)
- * Club domestic league appearances and goals as of 19 September 2026

Christian Gomis (born 25 August 1998) is a Senegalese professional footballer who plays as a centre-back or defensive midfielder for Super League club Java United.

== Club career ==
Gomis has previously played for Pacy Ménilles, ASD Cordenons, ÉF Bastia and Paris Saint-Germain B.

On 8 August 2023, it was announced that Gomis had signed for Hungarian OTP Bank Liga club Mezőkövesd.

== Career statistics ==
=== Club ===
As of match played 10 May 2025

Appearances and goals by club, season and competition
Club	Season	League			Cup		League Cup		Continental		Other		Total	
Club	Season	Division	Apps	Goals	Apps	Goals	Apps	Goals	Apps	Goals	Apps	Goals	Apps	Goals
Pacy Ménilles	2017–18	National 3	7	0	—		—		—		—		7	0
ÉF Bastia	2018–19	National 3	13	1	—		—		—		—		13	1
Lokomotiv Plovdiv	2020–21	Bulgarian First League	21	1	3	0	—		—		—		24	1
Lokomotiv Plovdiv	2021–22	Bulgarian First League	28	0	3	1	—		4	0	—		35	1
Lokomotiv Plovdiv	Total		49	1	6	1	—		4	0	—		59	2
Budapest Honvéd	2022–23	NB I	26	0	3	0	—		—		—		29	0
Mezőkövesd	2023–24	NB I	17	0	0	0	—		—		—		17	0
BG Pathum United	2024–25	Thai League 1	28	2	4	0	2	1	—		6	0	40	3
Career total			140	4	13	1	2	1	4	0	6	0	165	6
