= Petar Georgiev (footballer) =

Bulgarian footballer

Personal information
- Full name: Petar Georgiev
- Date of birth: 10 May 2002 (age 24)
- Place of birth: Bulgaria
- Height: 1.70 m (5 ft 7 in)
- Position: Midfielder

Team information
- Current team: Septemvri Tervel
- Number: 75

Youth career
- Ludogorets Razgrad

Senior career*
Years	Team	Apps	(Gls)
2020–2024	Ludogorets II	92	(5)
2021–2024	Ludogorets Razgrad	1	(0)
2024	Dobrudzha	10	(3)
2025–	Septemvri Tervel	0	(0)
- * Club domestic league appearances and goals as of 07:17, 2 January 2025 (UTC)

Petar Georgiev (Bulgarian: Петър Георгиев; born 10 May 2002), known also as Pepinho, is a Bulgarian footballer who plays as a midfielder for Septemvri Tervel.

== Career ==
Georgiev started his youth career at Ludogorets Razgrad academy joining to their second team in 2020. Pepinho moved to Dobrudzha on 19 June 2024.
