= Valentin Tsvetanov =

Bulgarian footballer

Personal information
- Date of birth: 8 April 2002 (age 24)
- Place of birth: Sevlievo, Bulgaria
- Height: 1.70 m (5 ft 7 in)
- Position: Midfielder

Team information
- Current team: Sevlievo
- Number: 18

Youth career
- Ludogorets Razgrad

Senior career*
Years	Team	Apps	(Gls)
2020–2023	Ludogorets III	21	(3)
2020–2023	Ludogorets II	30	(0)
2021–2023	Ludogorets Razgrad	1	(0)
2023–2025	Yantra Gabrovo	31	(0)
2025–	Sevlievo	0	(0)
- * Club domestic league appearances and goals as of 11:47, 22 October 2024 (UTC)

Valentin Tsvetanov (Bulgarian: Валентин Цветанов; born 8 April 2002) is a Bulgarian footballer who plays as a midfielder for Sevlievo.

== Career ==
Tsvetanov completed his league debut for Ludogorets Razgrad on 26 May 2021 in a match against CSKA 1948.
