= Georgi Chukalov =

Bulgarian footballer

Personal information
- Full name: Georgi Yordanov Chukalov
- Date of birth: 25 February 1998 (age 28)
- Place of birth: Plovdiv, Bulgaria
- Height: 1.84 m (6 ft 0 in)
- Position: Left winger

Youth career
- –2016: Lokomotiv Plovdiv
- 2017: Slavia Sofia

Senior career*
Years	Team	Apps	(Gls)
2015–2016	Lokomotiv Plovdiv	4	(0)
2017–2018	Lokomotiv GO	21	(5)
2018–2019	Arda Kardzhali	1	(0)
2019–2020	Pomorie	17	(2)
2020–2022	Ludogorets Razgrad II	46	(7)
2021–2022	Ludogorets Razgrad	1	(0)
2022	Spartak Varna	16	(3)

International career^{‡}
2015	Bulgaria U17	6	(2)
2016–2017	Bulgaria U19	4	(0)
- * Club domestic league appearances and goals as of 19 October 2022 ‡ National team caps and goals as of 8 June 2016

Georgi Yordanov Chukalov (Bulgarian: Георги Чукалов; born 25 February 1998) is a Bulgarian footballer who plays as a midfielder.

== Career ==
Chukalov bеgan his career with Botev Plovdiv, but later moved to Lokomotiv Plovdiv. On 17 May 2015, he made his A Group debut in a game against Marek Dupnitsa. In January 2017, Chukalov moved to Slavia Sofia and quickly established himself in the U19 team. However, as he couldn't break into the first team, he joined Lokomotiv Gorna Oryahovitsa in July.

In January 2022 Chukanov joined Spartak Varna, coming on loan from Ludogorets Razgrad.

== Career statistics ==
=== Club ===
As of 29 May 2016

Club performance			League		Cup		Continental		Other		Total	
Club	League	Season	Apps	Goals	Apps	Goals	Apps	Goals	Apps	Goals	Apps	Goals
Bulgaria			League		Bulgarian Cup		Europe		Other (Note: Includes Bulgarian Supercup matches.)		Total	
Lokomotiv Plovdiv	A Group	2014–15	3	0	0	0	–		–		3	0
Lokomotiv Plovdiv	A Group	2015–16	1	0	0	0	–		–		1	0
Lokomotiv Plovdiv	Total		4	0	0	0	0	0	0	0	4	0
Career statistics			4	0	0	0	0	0	0	0	4	0
