= List of Bulgarian football transfers winter 2023–24 =

This is a list of Bulgarian football transfers for the 2023-24 winter transfer window. Only transfers involving a team from the two professional leagues, First League and Second League are listed.

== First League ==
=== Arda ===
In:

No.	Pos.	Nation	Player
9	FW	NGA	Chinonso Offor (on loan from (Canada) CF Montréal)
10	MF	BUL	Borislav Tsonev (from (China) Dalian Professional)
11	FW	BUL	Boris Tyutyukov (from Pirin Blagoevgrad)
93	DF	CMR	Félix Eboa Eboa (free agent)

Out:

No.	Pos.	Nation	Player
3	DF	CIV	Oumar Sako (on loan to (Russia) Rostov)
9	FW	BUL	Preslav Borukov (to (Portugal) Marítimo)
11	DF	BUL	Martin Stoychev (loan return to Septemvri Sofia)
21	MF	BUL	Radoslav Tsonev (to (Kazakhstan) Tobol)
24	GK	BUL	Ivan Dichevski (released)

=== Beroe ===
In:

No.	Pos.	Nation	Player
1	GK	BRA	Arthur Motta (from (Brazil) Guarani)
6	DF	ECU	Jordi Govea (loan return from (Ecuador) Orense)
7	MF	ARG	Federico Zanetti (from (Spain) Racing Murcia)
8	MF	ESP	Javier Esteban-Silgo (from (Cyprus) Ayia Napa)
9	FW	URU	Francisco Sagardia (from (Uruguay) Defensor Sporting B)
11	MF	BRA	Werick Caetano (from (Poland) Stomil Olsztyn)
12	DF	FRA	Temitope Akinjogunla (Free agent)
18	DF	ARG	Juan Salomoni (from (Argentina) Guillermo Brown)
19	MF	ESP	Carlos Algarra (from (Spain) Logroñés)
21	MF	BUL	Damyan Yordanov (loan return from (Italy) Lazio Primavera)
22	MF	COL	Sebastián Villa (from (Argentina) Boca Juniors)
25	DF	FRA	Moussa Diallo (on loan from (Switzerland) Servette)
98	MF	GNB	Ronaldo Camará (from (Portugal) Feirense)

Out:

No.	Pos.	Nation	Player
1	GK	ARG	Juan Pablo Lungarzo (to (Argentina) Comunicaciones)
2	DF	BRA	Gustavo Cascardo (to Arda)
4	MF	ARG	Francesco Celeste (to (Venezuela) Zamora)
6	DF	ECU	Jordi Govea (on loan to (Ecuador) Orense)
8	MF	BUL	Bozhidar Penchev (to Hebar)
9	FW	ARG	Santiago Godoy (on loan to (Argentina) Defensa y Justicia)
10	MF	ARG	Enzo Hoyos (loan return to (Argentina) Chacarita Juniors)
17	MF	COL	Edwin Laszo (to (United States) Tulsa)
19	FW	BUL	Vasil Vasilev (to Yantra Gabrovo)
21	MF	ARG	Thiago Ceijas (to (Poland) ŁKS Łódź)
25	DF	PAR	Jose Arias (to (Portugal) Ovarense)
98	MF	VEN	Bruno Schmutz (to (Switzerland) Schaffhausen)
99	FW	ECU	Mike Cevallos (on loan to (Spain) El Palo)
—	FW	ARG	Gonzalo Issa (to (Gibraltar) College 1975)

=== Botev Plovdiv ===
In:

No.	Pos.	Nation	Player
32	GK	EST	Matvei Igonen (from Hebar)
44	DF	CIV	Siriky Diabate (from (France) Amiens)
93	FW	BUL	Georgi Nikolov (from Hebar)

Out:

No.	Pos.	Nation	Player
2	DF	ISR	Roy Herman (released)

=== Botev Vratsa ===
In:

No.	Pos.	Nation	Player
7	DF	BUL	Ilker Budinov (on loan from Ludogorets)
8	MF	FRA	Kléri Serber (on loan from (France) Toulouse)
11	FW	MLI	Lassana N'Diaye (from (Serbia) Radnički Niš)
27	DF	CGO	Messie Biatoumoussoka (from (Morocco) AS FAR)

Out:

No.	Pos.	Nation	Player
4	DF	BRA	Luiz Soares (released)
7	MF	BUL	Momchil Tsvetanov (to Krumovgrad)
22	DF	BUL	Petar Kepov (released)

=== Cherno More ===
In:

No.	Pos.	Nation	Player
11	MF	BUL	Ilian Iliev Jr. (on loan from (Cyprus) Apollon Limassol)
15	DF	ESP	Dani Martín (from (Spain) Melilla)
16	FW	ROU	Andreias Calcan (from (Romania) Universitatea Cluj)
30	DF	BUL	Petar Ivanov (loan return from Yantra Gabrovo)
99	FW	BRA	Weslen Júnior (from (Bahrain) Manama Club)

Out:

No.	Pos.	Nation	Player
11	MF	BRA	Alex Fernandes (to (Russia) Baltika Kaliningrad)
19	DF	BUL	Aleksandar Vasilev (retired)
35	MF	SUI	Arlind Dakaj (to (Albania) Erzeni)
—	MF	BUL	Velislav Vasilev (on loan to Yantra Gabrovo)

=== CSKA Sofia ===
In:

No.	Pos.	Nation	Player
7	MF	NOR	Olaus Skarsem (from (Norway) Rosenborg)
9	FW	BRA	Fernando Karanga (from (China) Jinan Xingzhou)
20	DF	BUL	Martin Stoychev (from Septemvri Sofia, previously on loan to Arda)

Out:

No.	Pos.	Nation	Player
9	FW	HAI	Duckens Nazon (to (Turkey) Kayserispor)
10	FW	ARM	Zhirayr Shaghoyan (loan return to Ararat-Armenia)
28	FW	COL	Brayan Moreno (to (Azerbaijan) Neftçi)
29	FW	ECU	Michael Estrada (loan return to (Mexico) Deportivo Toluca)
20	DF	BUL	Asen Donchev (on loan to Pirin Blagoevgrad)
24	FW	BUL	Mark-Emilio Papazov (on loan to Hebar Pazardzhik)
—	GK	BUL	Aleks Bozhev (on loan to Litex Lovech)
—	DF	BUL	Aleksandar Buchkov (on loan to Litex Lovech)
—	MF	BUL	Simeon Aleksandrov (on loan to Septemvri Sofia)
—	FW	BUL	Pavel Zhabov (on loan to Chernomorets Burgas)
—	FW	GHA	Bismark Charles (on loan to (Bosnia and Herzegovina) Željezničar)

=== CSKA 1948 ===
In:

No.	Pos.	Nation	Player

Out:

No.	Pos.	Nation	Player
4	DF	BUL	Miki Orachev (released)
5	DF	BUL	Simeon Petrov (on loan to (Poland) Śląsk Wrocław)
9	FW	ISL	Viðar Örn Kjartansson (released)
18	MF	BUL	Ivaylo Chochev (to Ludogorets)
19	FW	CMR	Rooney Eva (to (China) Meizhou Hakka)
26	FW	FRA	Aeron Zinga (released)

=== Etar ===
In:

No.	Pos.	Nation	Player
5	DF	FRA	Kelyan Guessoum (from (France) Nîmes)
6	MF	ESP	Gorka Larrucea (from (Romania) Dinamo București)
9	FW	BUL	Ivan Vasilev (from Yantra Gabrovo)
12	GK	SVN	Kristijan Sekulić (from (Bosnia and Herzegovina) Rudar Prijedor)
13	MF	FIN	Didis Lutumba-Pitah (from (Lithuania) Hegelmann)
18	MF	BEL	Joachim Carcela (free agent)
94	DF	FRA	Jean-Marc Tiboué (free agent)

Out:

No.	Pos.	Nation	Player
2	DF	BUL	Valeri Hristov (released)
6	DF	BUL	Plamen Dimov (released)
9	FW	BUL	Martin Toshev (released)
10	FW	BUL	Vladislav Naydenov (loan return to Ludogorets)
11	MF	BUL	Ilker Budinov (loan return to Ludogorets)
12	GK	ITA	Alessandro Guarnone (to (Malta) Valletta)
19	FW	PAN	Javier Betegón (loan return to (Panama) C.A. Independiente)
26	DF	BUL	Mariyan Ivanov (released)
29	MF	BUL	Yanko Angelov (released)
32	MF	NED	Oussama Alou (released)
70	MF	BUL	Dimo Bakalov (released)

=== Hebar ===
In:

No.	Pos.	Nation	Player
17	FW	BUL	Mark-Emilio Papazov (on loan from CSKA Sofia)
21	MF	BUL	Bozhidar Penchev (from Beroe)
32	GK	BUL	Boyan Zagorski (from Vihren Sandanski)
75	MF	MAD	Johan N'Zi (from Spartak Varna)
99	MF	BUL	Georgi Karakashev (on loan from Lokomotiv Plovdiv)

Out:

No.	Pos.	Nation	Player
8	MF	GHA	Carlos Ohene (to Levski Sofia)
9	FW	BUL	Georgi Nikolov (to Botev Plovdiv)
13	MF	AUT	Marcel Canadi (released)
32	GK	EST	Matvei Igonen (to Botev Plovdiv)

=== Krumovgrad ===
In:

No.	Pos.	Nation	Player
7	MF	BUL	Momchil Tsvetanov (from Botev Vratsa)
67	FW	BRA	Matheus Souza (from (Qatar) Al-Waab)
—	FW	SEN	Lamine Tall (from (Italy) Angri)

Out:

No.	Pos.	Nation	Player
7	FW	BRA	Bruno Garcia (released)
14	MF	SWE	Daniel Miljanović (released)

=== Levski Sofia ===
In:

No.	Pos.	Nation	Player
7	FW	BRA	Fábio Lima (from (Brazil) ABC)
8	MF	GHA	Carlos Ohene (from Hebar)
17	FW	BRA	Everton Bala (on loan from (Brazil) Mirassol)
23	MF	SVK	Patrik Myslovič (from (Slovakia) Žilina)
24	DF	URU	Joaquín Fernández (from (Uruguay) Atenas)
—	MF	BUL	Zdravko Dimitrov (loan return from Septemvri Sofia)

Out:

No.	Pos.	Nation	Player
2	DF	FRA	Jeremy Petris (to (Belgium) Charleroi)
7	FW	BRA	Ronaldo (to (Russia) Rostov)
17	FW	BRA	Welton Felipe (to (Japan) Gamba Osaka)
37	MF	BRA	Darlan (to (China) Wuhan Three Towns)
—	MF	CUW	Nathan Holder (on loan to Sportist Svoge)
—	MF	BUL	Zdravko Dimitrov (on loan to (Turkey) Sakaryaspor)

=== Lokomotiv Plovdiv ===
In:

No.	Pos.	Nation	Player
9	FW	BEL	Mitchy Ntelo (from (Belgium) Charleroi)
10	MF	FRA	Yohan Baï (from (France) Bastia)
17	MF	BUL	Martin Raynov (from Lokomotiv Sofia)
19	MF	BLR	Vladimir Medved (on loan from Pirin Blagoevgrad)
88	GK	BUL	Martin Lukov (from (Cyprus) Karmiotissa)
—	MF	VEN	Cristhian Mendoza (loan return from Dobrudzha)

Out:

No.	Pos.	Nation	Player
9	FW	BUL	Georgi Minchev (to (Cyprus) AEL Limassol)
10	FW	BRA	Giovanny (to (China) Guangxi Pingguo)
33	MF	BUL	Georgi Karakashev (on loan to Hebar)
99	MF	BRA	Léo Sena (released)
—	MF	VEN	Cristhian Mendoza (released)

=== Lokomotiv Sofia ===
In:

No.	Pos.	Nation	Player
7	FW	FRA	Kévin Mayi (from (Turkey) Ankara Keçiörengücü)
13	DF	POR	Celso Raposo (from (Greece) Kalamata)
44	DF	BUL	Miki Orachev (from CSKA 1948)

Out:

No.	Pos.	Nation	Player
7	MF	BRA	Felipe Ryan (released)
13	DF	BUL	Galin Minkov (released)
33	DF	BRA	Alan Dias (released)

=== Ludogorets ===
In:

No.	Pos.	Nation	Player
18	MF	BUL	Ivaylo Chochev (from CSKA 1948)
99	FW	BRA	Rwan Cruz (from (Brazil) Santos)
—	DF	BUL	Ilker Budinov (loan return from Etar)

Out:

No.	Pos.	Nation	Player
11	FW	FRA	Mounir Chouiar (on loan to (France) Amiens)
15	DF	BRA	Pedro Henrique (on loan to (Brazil) Guarani)
20	MF	BRA	Nonato (to (Brazil) Santos)
21	DF	SVN	Žan Karničnik (to (Slovenia) Celje)
22	DF	ARG	Franco Russo (on loan to (Belgium) OH Leuven)
32	DF	UKR	Ihor Plastun (released)
64	MF	BUL	Dominik Yankov (to (Canada) CF Montréal)
—	DF	BUL	Ilker Budinov (on loan to Botev Vratsa)

=== Pirin Blagoevgrad ===
In:

No.	Pos.	Nation	Player
7	DF	BUL	Asen Donchev (on loan from CSKA Sofia)
8	MF	BUL	Lazar Boyanov (from (Portugal) Esperança de Lagos)
14	FW	UKR	Danylo Polonskyi (from Fratria)
18	DF	FRA	Arnaud Luzayadio (from (Netherlands) Emmen)
28	DF	LVA	Vitālijs Jagodinskis (from (Latvia) RFS)

Out:

No.	Pos.	Nation	Player
8	MF	UKR	Dmytro Semeniv (to Spartak Varna)
10	FW	UKR	Danylo Kondrakov (released)
17	FW	BUL	Boris Tyutyukov (to Arda Kardzhali)
20	MF	BLR	Vladimir Medved (on loan to Lokomotiv Plovdiv)
29	DF	BUL	Martin Bachev (released)

=== Slavia Sofia ===
In:

No.	Pos.	Nation	Player
20	FW	BUL	Nikolay Hristov (from (Norway) Grorud IL)
93	MF	CTA	Isaac Solet (from (Romania) Progresul Spartac)

Out:

No.	Pos.	Nation	Player
18	DF	CPV	Ludovic Soares (released)

== Second League ==
=== Bdin ===
In:

No.	Pos.	Nation	Player
1	GK	SRB	Velko Markovic (from (Serbia) Radnički Pirot)
21	FW	BRA	Emanuel Vieira (from Drenovets)
30	DF	BUL	Ivan Avramov (from Sportist Svoge)
44	MF	FRA	Livan Obisa (from Montana)
99	MF	BUL	Simeon Ivanov (from Spartak Varna II)

Out:

No.	Pos.	Nation	Player
2	GK	BUL	Ivan Vasilev (to CSKA 1948 II)

=== Belasitsa ===
In:

No.	Pos.	Nation	Player
14	MF	BUL	Ivan Marchev (from FC Kyustendil)
18	DF	BUL	Petar Kepov (from Botev Vratsa)
80	MF	BUL	Daniel Gogov (from Marek)
88	DF	BUL	Vasil Bozhinov (from Strumska Slava)
90	FW	BUL	Andon Gushterov (from Marek)

Out:

No.	Pos.	Nation	Player
3	DF	BUL	Viktor Ergin (to Bansko)
14	MF	BUL	Blagovest Danchev (released)
16	DF	ARM	Arman Markosyan (released)
—	FW	BRA	Igor Felipe (to Vihren Sandanski)

=== Chernomorets Balchik ===
In:

No.	Pos.	Nation	Player

Out:

No.	Pos.	Nation	Player
—	MF	BUL	Pavel Georgiev (to Chernomorets Burgas)

=== Chernomorets Burgas ===
In:

No.	Pos.	Nation	Player
1	GK	BUL	Stanislav Nistorov (from CSKA 1948 II)
8	MF	BUL	Pavel Georgiev (from Chernomorets Balchik)
10	MF	BUL	Emanuil Manev (from Dobrudzha)
13	DF	BUL	Borislav Vakadinov (from Spartak Varna)
14	MF	FRA	Saidou Dembelé (from Sportist Svoge)
26	DF	BUL	Kamen Hadzhiev (from (Germany) SSV Jeddeloh)
35	FW	BUL	Mariyan Tonev (from CSKA 1948 II)
89	FW	SEN	Alioune Badará (from Septemvri Sofia)
90	FW	BUL	Pavel Zhabov (on loan from CSKA Sofia)

Out:

No.	Pos.	Nation	Player
8	MF	BUL	Plamen Tsonchev (to Spartak Plovdiv)
10	FW	BUL	Ventsislav Gyuzelev (to Spartak Plovdiv)
18	MF	MKD	Stojanco Velinov (to Nesebar)

=== CSKA 1948 II ===
In:

No.	Pos.	Nation	Player
51	FW	FRA	Diedry Kouassi (from (France) Monaco U21)
55	DF	BUL	Rafail Parlikov (from Strumska Slava)
57	GK	FRA	Lévi Ntumba (from (Switzerland) Grasshopper)
67	GK	BUL	Ivan Vasilev (from Bdin)
80	MF	BUL	Boris Dimitrov (from Chavdar Etropole)

Out:

No.	Pos.	Nation	Player
31	FW	BUL	Mariyan Tonev (released)
45	FW	BUL	Preslav Antonov (released)
48	FW	BUL	Kristiyan Grozdanov (released)
57	GK	BUL	Stanislav Nistorov (to Chernomorets Burgas)
70	MF	BUL	Nasko Tsekov (released)
73	MF	BUL	Steliyan Dobrev (to Fratria)
80	FW	BUL	Iliya Rusinov (released)
88	FW	BUL	Ahmed Ademov (released)
—	DF	BUL	Nikolay Zhelyazkov (released)
—	DF	BUL	Daniel Madzharov (released)
—	DF	BRA	Tiago Barbosa (released)
—	MF	BUL	Ayvan Angelov (to Yantra Gabrovo)

=== Dobrudzha ===
In:

No.	Pos.	Nation	Player
5	DF	BUL	Nikolay Zhelyazkov (from CSKA 1948 III)
7	MF	CPV	Paulo Soares (from (United States) Rochester New York FC)
10	FW	FRA	Sofiane Dia (free agent)
11	MF	POR	Bruno Amado (from (Portugal) Oliveira do Hospital)
17	FW	SUI	Raël Lolala (from Dunav Ruse)
25	GK	BUL	Aleksey Andreev (from Montana)
—	MF	BRA	Buá (from (Brazil) CTE Colatina)
—	MF	BEL	Foudil Idriss (from (Lebanon) Al-Ansar FC)

Out:

No.	Pos.	Nation	Player
5	DF	BUL	Ivailo Minchev (released)
6	MF	VEN	Cristhian Mendoza (loan return to Lokomotiv Plovdiv)
7	FW	BUL	Stefan Statev (released)
10	MF	BUL	Slavcho Shokolarov (retired)
11	MF	BUL	Stefan Mitev (released)
12	MF	BUL	Emanuil Manev (to Chernomorets Burgas)
13	DF	BUL	Kristian Varbanov (to Lokomotiv Ruse)
18	DF	BUL	Petko Tsankov (released)
21	MF	BUL	Lachezar Yordanov (released)
25	GK	BUL	Hristo Kovachev (released)
77	MF	BUL	Yancho Andreev (to Fratria)
88	MF	BUL	Svetoslav Nikolov (to Spartak Varna)

=== Dunav ===
In:

No.	Pos.	Nation	Player
8	MF	UKR	Stanislav Nechiporenko (from (Poland) Ząbkovia Ząbki)
13	DF	BUL	Galin Minkov (from Lokomotiv Sofia)

Out:

No.	Pos.	Nation	Player
18	DF	BUL	Iliya Milanov (to Rilski Sportist)

=== Litex Lovech ===
In:

No.	Pos.	Nation	Player
9	MF	SRB	Damir Salihovic (from (Serbia) Josanica)
18	DF	SRB	Dragan Cubra (from (Hungary) Ferencvárosi II)
20	DF	BUL	Aleksandar Buchkov (on loan from CSKA Sofia)
22	MF	MKD	Bozidar Mitrevski (from (Slovenia) Rogaška)
—	DF	SRB	Marko Andic (from (Serbia) BASK)

Out:

No.	Pos.	Nation	Player
7	FW	BUL	Pavel Zhabov (loan return to CSKA Sofia)
9	FW	BUL	Georgi Georgiev (released)
12	MF	BUL	Denis Georgiev (to Sevlievo)

=== Ludogorets II ===
In:

No.	Pos.	Nation	Player
97	FW	BUL	Vladislav Naydenov (loan return from Etar)

Out:

No.	Pos.	Nation	Player
50	MF	BUL	Tsvetoslav Petrov (to Spartak Varna)

=== Marek ===
In:

No.	Pos.	Nation	Player

Out:

No.	Pos.	Nation	Player
3	DF	BUL	Rumen Sandev (to Strumska Slava)
7	FW	BUL	Andon Gushterov (released)
11	FW	BUL	Dimitar Vladimirov (released)
18	DF	BUL	Raif Muradov (released)
88	MF	BUL	Daniel Gogov (released)

=== Maritsa ===
In:

No.	Pos.	Nation	Player
6	MF	BUL	Yanko Angelov (from Etar Veliko Tarnovo)
20	DF	BUL	Teodor Andreev (from Slavia Sofia II)
22	MF	BUL	Dimo Bakalov (from Etar Veliko Tarnovo)

Out:

No.	Pos.	Nation	Player
4	DF	BUL	Miroslav Pushkarov (released)

=== Montana ===
In:

No.	Pos.	Nation	Player
16	FW	BUL	Aleksandar Asparuhov (from Strumska Slava)
17	FW	BUL	Steven Kirilov (from Strumska Slava)

Out:

No.	Pos.	Nation	Player
11	FW	BUL	Borislav Damyanov (released)

=== Septemvri Sofia ===
In:

No.	Pos.	Nation	Player
6	MF	NGA	Victor Ochayi (free agent)
9	FW	BUL	Martin Toshev (from Etar Veliko Tarnovo)
17	MF	BUL	Simeon Aleksandrov (on loan from CSKA Sofia)
22	DF	CYP	Strahinja Kerkez (from (Slovakia) AS Trenčín)

Out:

No.	Pos.	Nation	Player
9	FW	BUL	Aleksandar Petrov (to Yantra Gabrovo)
26	FW	SEN	Alioune Badará (to Chernomorets Burgas)

=== Spartak Pleven ===
In:

No.	Pos.	Nation	Player

Out:

No.	Pos.	Nation	Player

=== Spartak Varna ===
In:

No.	Pos.	Nation	Player
8	FW	BUL	Tsvetoslav Petrov (from Ludogorets Razgrad II)
31	MF	UKR	Dmytro Semeniv (from Pirin Blagoevgrad)
47	MF	BUL	Svetoslav Nikolov (from Dobrudzha)

Out:

No.	Pos.	Nation	Player
4	DF	BUL	Borislav Vakadinov (released)
7	MF	BUL	Evgeni Iliev (released)
8	MF	BUL	Bozhidar Vasev (released)
75	MF	MAD	Johan N'Zi (released)
78	MF	BUL	Ayvan Angelov (loan return to CSKA 1948 II)

=== Sportist Svoge ===
In:

No.	Pos.	Nation	Player

Out:

No.	Pos.	Nation	Player
23	MF	FRA	Saidou Dembelé (to Chernomorets Burgas)

=== Strumska Slava ===
In:

No.	Pos.	Nation	Player
3	DF	BUL	Rumen Sandev (from Marek)
7	MF	BUL	Evgeni Iliev (from Spartak Varna)
9	FW	BUL	Tsvetomir Vachev (from Chavdar Etropole)
11	MF	BUL	Yordan Todorov (from Slivnishki Geroy)
17	DF	BUL	Ahmed Ademov (from CSKA 1948 II)
18	MF	CRO	Arnel Kadric (from (Croatia) NK Bistra)
19	MF	BUL	Martin Stoilov (from Spartak Varna II)
99	GK	BUL	Radoslav Rashkov (free agent)

Out:

No.	Pos.	Nation	Player
1	GK	BUL	Kristiyan Dimitrov (released)
3	MF	BUL	Hristo Mladenov (released)
9	FW	BUL	Aleksandar Asparuhov (to Montana)
13	DF	BUL	Slavi Kosov (released)
14	DF	BUL	Dimitar Stoyanov (to Yantra Gabrovo)
17	FW	BUL	Steven Kirilov (to Montana)
20	MF	BUL	Kristiyan Kitov (retired)
22	MF	BUL	Aleks Zhelev (to Septemvri Simitli)
88	DF	BUL	Vasil Bozhinov (to Belasitsa Petrich)
91	DF	BUL	Rafail Parlikov (to CSKA 1948 II)

=== Yantra ===
In:

No.	Pos.	Nation	Player
3	DF	BUL	Dimitar Stoyanov (from Strumska Slava)
8	FW	BUL	Kristian Grozdanov (from CSKA 1948 III)
9	FW	BUL	Aleksandar Petrov (from Septemvri Sofia)
10	MF	BUL	Ayvan Angelov (from CSKA 1948 II)
20	FW	BUL	Velislav Vasilev (on loan from Cherno More)
27	MF	BUL	Lachezar Yordanov (from Dobrudzha)
99	FW	BUL	Vasil Vasilev (from Beroe)

Out:

No.	Pos.	Nation	Player
3	DF	BUL	Petar Ivanov (loan return to Cherno More)
8	MF	BUL	Georgi Nedkov (to Sevlievo)
9	FW	BUL	Ivan Vasilev (to Etar Veliko Tarnovo)
20	DF	BUL	Ivan-Ioannis Atanatos (to Sevlievo)
