= Metodiy Stefanov =

Bulgarian footballer

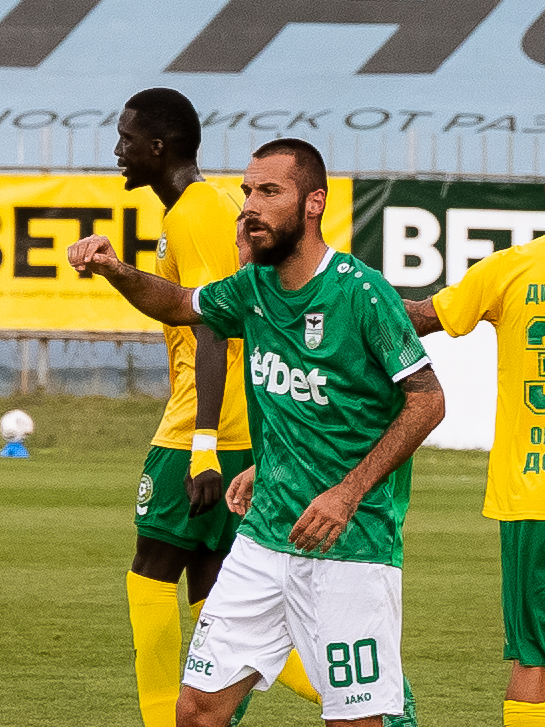
- Stefanov while playing for Pirin in 2026.

Personal information
- Full name: Metodiy Ivanov Stefanov
- Date of birth: 5 August 2000 (age 26)
- Place of birth: Blagoevgrad, Bulgaria
- Position: Attacking midfielder

Team information
- Current team: Pirin Blagoevgrad
- Number: 80

Youth career
- Pirin Blagoevgrad

Senior career*
Years	Team	Apps	(Gls)
2017–2018	Pirin Blagoevgrad	14	(0)
2019–2026	Ludogorets Razgrad II	211	(7)
2024–2026	Ludogorets Razgrad	3	(0)
2026–	Pirin Blagoevgrad	12	(0)

International career^{‡}
2016–2017	Bulgaria U17	1	(0)
2018–2019	Bulgaria U19	2	(1)
- * Club domestic league appearances and goals as of 08:14, 5 November 2026 (UTC) ‡ National team caps and goals as of 14 November 2018

Metodiy Stefanov (Bulgarian: Методий Стефанов; born 5 August 2000) is a Bulgarian footballer who currently plays as a midfielder for Pirin Blagoevgrad.

== Club career ==
=== Ludogorets Razgrad ===
After spending 2 seasons with the first team of Pirin Blagoevgrad Stefanov signed with Ludogorets Razgrad, joining their second team. He made his debut for the team in a Second League match on 24 February 2019 against Lokomotiv Sofia.

== International career ==
Stefanov was called up for Bulgaria U19 in October 2018 for the friendlies against Azerbaijan U19. He scored a goal in the second match played on 25 October 2018.

== Career statistics ==
=== Club ===
As of 28 May 2024

Club	Season	League			Cup		Europe		Other		Total	
Club	Season	Division	Apps	Goals	Apps	Goals	Apps	Goals	Apps	Goals	Apps	Goals
Pirin Blagoevgrad	2017–18	First League	6	0	0	0	–		4 (Note: Includes Relegation playoffs matches.)	0	10	0
Pirin Blagoevgrad	2018–19	Second League	8	0	1	0	–		–		9	0
Pirin Blagoevgrad	Total		14	0	1	0	0	0	4	0	19	0
Ludogorets Razgrad II	2018–19	Second League	9	0	–		–		–		9	0
Ludogorets Razgrad II	2019–20	Second League	20	1	–		–		–		20	1
Ludogorets Razgrad II	2020–21	Second League	20	0	–		–		–		20	0
Ludogorets Razgrad II	2021–22	Second League	34	1	–		–		–		34	1
Ludogorets Razgrad II	2022–23	Second League	32	1	–		–		–		32	1
Ludogorets Razgrad II	2023–24	Second League	32	0	–		–		–		32	0
Ludogorets Razgrad II	Total		147	3	0	0	0	0	0	0	147	3
Ludogorets Razgrad	2023–24	First League	1	0	1	0	0	0	—		2	0
Ludogorets Razgrad	2024–25	First League	0	0	0	0	0	0	—		0	0
Ludogorets Razgrad	Total		1	0	1	0	0	0	0	0	2	0
Career total			162	3	2	0	0	0	4	0	168	3
