= Simeon Aleksandrov =

Bulgarian footballer

Personal information
- Full name: Simeon Slaveykov Aleksandrov
- Date of birth: 24 September 2003 (age 23)
- Place of birth: Plovdiv, Bulgaria
- Height: 1.64 m (5 ft 5 in)
- Positions: Attacking midfielder; winger

Team information
- Current team: Türkgücü München

Youth career
- 2011–2015: Lokomotiv Plovdiv
- 2015–2019: Septemvri Sofia

Senior career*
Years	Team	Apps	(Gls)
2019–2022	Septemvri Sofia	59	(12)
2022–2024	CSKA Sofia II	5	(0)
2022–2024	CSKA Sofia	1	(0)
2023	→ Septemvri Sofia (loan)	15	(1)
2023	→ Pirin Blagoevgrad (loan)	12	(0)
2024	→ Septemvri Sofia (loan)	6	(2)
2024	CSKA 1948 II	15	(3)
2024–2025	CSKA 1948	2	(0)
2025–2026	Westfalia Herne	24	(5)
2026–	Türkgücü München	0	(0)

International career^{‡}
2018–2019	Bulgaria U17	3	(0)
2021–	Bulgaria U19	1	(0)
2022–	Bulgaria U21	5	(0)
- * Club domestic league appearances and goals as of 12:30, 24 June 2026 (UTC) ‡ National team caps and goals as of 08:30, 28 March 2023 (UTC)

Simeon Slaveykov Aleksandrov (Bulgarian: Симеон Славейков Александров; born 24 September 2003) is a Bulgarian footballer who plays as an attacking midfielder and winger for Türkgücü München.

== Career ==
Born in Plovdiv, Aleksandrov started out at local Lokomotiv Plovdiv at the age of 8. Four years later, he joined Septemvri Sofia academy and was promoted to the first team in 2019. In the summer of 2022, the team won promotion to the First League. Aleksandrov made his debut in the top division on 8 July 2022 against Ludogorets Razgrad. On 18 July 2022, he scored his debut top level goal in a match against Hebar. After his good start of the 2022–23 season with Septemvri in First League, he moved to CSKA Sofia in the last day of transfer window.

== Career statistics ==
=== Club ===
As of 7 September 2025

Club performance			League		Cup		Continental		Other		Total	
Club	League	Season	Apps	Goals	Apps	Goals	Apps	Goals	Apps	Goals	Apps	Goals
Bulgaria			League		Bulgarian Cup		Europe		Other (Note: Includes Bulgarian Supercup matches.)		Total	
Septemvri Sofia	Second League	2019–20	3	0	0	0	–		–		3	0
Septemvri Sofia	Second League	2020–21	17	5	0	0	–		–		17	5
Septemvri Sofia	Second League	2021–22	31	3	2	0	–		–		33	3
Septemvri Sofia	First League	2022–23	8	4	0	0	–		–		8	4
Septemvri Sofia	Total		59	12	2	0	0	0	0	0	61	12
CSKA Sofia II	Third League	2022–23	2	0	0	0	–		–		2	0
CSKA Sofia II	Second League	2024–25	3	0	0	0	–		–		3	0
CSKA Sofia II	Total		5	0	0	0	0	0	0	0	5	0
CSKA Sofia	First League	2022–23	1	0	1	0	0	0	–		2	0
Septemvri Sofia (loan)	First League	2023–24	15	1	0	0	–		–		15	1
Pirin Blagoevgrad (loan)	First League	2023–24	12	0	2	0	–		–		14	0
Septemvri Sofia (loan)	Second League	2023–24	5	2	0	0	–		–		5	2
CSKA 1948 II	Second League	2024–25	15	3	–		–		–		15	3
CSKA 1948	First League	2024–25	2	0	0	0	–		–		2	0
SC Westfalia Herne	Westfalenliga	2025–26	4	0	0	0	–		–		4	0
Career statistics			118	17	5	0	0	0	0	0	123	18
