= Daniel Nachev =

Bulgarian footballer

Personal information
- Full name: Daniel Zhivkov Nachev
- Date of birth: 20 September 2003 (age 23)
- Place of birth: Sofia, Bulgaria
- Height: 1.73 m (5 ft 8 in)
- Position: Attacking midfielder

Youth career
- 2009–2013: Septemvri Sofia
- 2013–2014: Botev Plovdiv
- 2014–2015: Septemvri Sofia
- 2015–2021: Levski Sofia

Senior career*
Years	Team	Apps	(Gls)
2021–2024	Spartak Varna II	9	(2)
2021–2025	Spartak Varna	73	(11)
2025–2026	Strumska Slava	21	(5)
2026	Sportist Svoge	4	(0)

International career
2019–2020	Bulgaria U17	8	(3)
- * Club domestic league appearances and goals as of 5 November 2026

Daniel Nachev (Bulgarian: Даниел Начев; born 20 September 2003) is a Bulgarian footballer who plays as a midfielder.

Considered to be one of biggest talents in Bulgaria, he gained media attention at just the age of 10 and was heavily compared with Lionel Messi and regularly called by the media The Bulgarian Messi.

== Career ==
=== Youth career ===
Nachev joined in Septemvri Sofia academy at an early age and gained media attention for first time in 2012 being called the Bulgarian Lionel Messi. In the end of 2013 he moved to Botev Plovdiv academy, but just after few months he returned to Septemvri in 2014. In the same year he had a trials to Manchester City. In 2015 he joined Levski Sofia. He became a captain of the U19 team aged 17. Despite occasionally training with the first team, in the end of June 2021, Nachev refused to sign a professional contract with Levski as he believed he didn't get enough chances.

=== Spartak Varna ===
On 29 June 2021, Nachev signed with Spartak Varna for an undisclosed transfer fee, joining the team until June 2024. He scored his first league goal on 4 August 2021 in a match against his youth team of Septemvri Sofia. On 7 September, in a cup match against Nadezhda Dobroslavtsi, he made 2 assists and was named man of the match. After the promote to Bulgarian First League, Nachev lost his position in the starting team. He got injured in November 2022, keeping him off play until March 2023. In May 2023, he returned in the first team. On 14 June 2023, Nachev extended his contract with Spartak until the summer of 2025. He had an important role for the team in the 2023-24 Second League win and promote back to First league. Sadly, in the end of the season he got an injury, that made him miss the whole 2024–25 season due to complicates. His contract ended on 31 June 2025 and he left the club.

In July 2025, he started training with Second League team of Fratria Varna, but few weeks later he left the team. In August he was announced to join Third League team of Strumska Slava.

In May 2026 he was included to Bulgaria's national minifootball team for the 2026 EMF EURO.

== Career statistics ==
=== Club ===
As of 13 May 2024

Club performance			League		Cup		Continental		Other		Total	
Club	League	Season	Apps	Goals	Apps	Goals	Apps	Goals	Apps	Goals	Apps	Goals
Bulgaria			League		Bulgarian Cup		Europe		Other (Note: Includes Bulgarian Supercup matches.)		Total	
Spartak Varna II	Third League	2021–22	1	0	–		–		–		1	0
Spartak Varna II	Third League	2022–23	6	1	–		–		–		6	1
Spartak Varna II	Third League	2023–24	2	1	–		–		–		2	1
Spartak Varna II	Total		9	2	0	0	0	0	0	0	9	2
Spartak Varna	Second League	2021–22	34	4	2	0	–		–		36	4
Spartak Varna	First League	2022–23	8	0	0	0	–		–		8	0
Spartak Varna	Second League	2023–24	30	6	2	0	–		–		32	6
Spartak Varna	First League	2024–25	0	0	0	0	–		–		0	0
Spartak Varna	Total		72	10	4	0	0	0	0	0	76	10
Career statistics			81	12	4	0	0	0	0	0	85	12
