= Hyusein Kelyovluev =

Bulgarian footballer

Personal information
- Full name: Hyusein Hyuseinov Kelyovluev
- Date of birth: 11 May 2000 (age 26)
- Place of birth: Razgrad, Bulgaria
- Height: 1.67 m (5 ft 6 in)
- Position: Midfielder

Team information
- Current team: Benkovski Isperih

Youth career
- Ludogorets Razgrad

Senior career*
Years	Team	Apps	(Gls)
2017–2025	Ludogorets Razgrad II	185	(40)
2020–2025	Ludogorets Razgrad	3	(0)
2025–2026	Dunav Ruse	27	(2)
2026–	Benkovski Isperih	6	(1)

International career
2018	Bulgaria U18	1	(1)
2018	Bulgaria U19	1	(0)
- * Club domestic league appearances and goals as of 16 October 2026

Hyusein Kelyovluev (Bulgarian: Хюсеин Кельовлуев; born 11 May 2000) is a Bulgarian footballer who plays as a midfielder for Benkovski Isperih.

== Career ==
Kelyovluev started his career in his local Ludogorets Razgrad academy. completed his league debut for the club on 26 May 2021 in a match against CSKA 1948. In June 2025, after being with the club since his childhood, he left Ludogorets and moved to Dunav Ruse.

== Career statistics ==
As of match played 5 July 2025

Appearances and goals by club, season and competition
Club	Season	League			Cup		Europe		Other		Total	
Club	Season	Division	Apps	Goals	Apps	Goals	Apps	Goals	Apps	Goals	Apps	Goals
Ludogorets Razgrad II	2018–19	Bulgarian Second League	7	0	—		—		—		7	0
Ludogorets Razgrad II	2019–20	Bulgarian Second League	21	2	—		—		—		21	2
Ludogorets Razgrad II	2020–21	Bulgarian Second League	23	2	—		—		—		23	2
Ludogorets Razgrad II	2021–22	Bulgarian Second League	33	9	—		—		—		33	9
Ludogorets Razgrad II	2022–23	Bulgarian Second League	34	8	—		—		—		34	8
Ludogorets Razgrad II	2023–24	Bulgarian Second League	31	5	—		—		—		31	5
Ludogorets Razgrad II	2024–25	Bulgarian Second League	37	14	—		—		—		37	14
Ludogorets Razgrad II	Total		185	40	—		—		—		185	40
Ludogorets Razgrad	2020–21	Bulgarian First League	1	0	0	0	0	0	—		1	0
Ludogorets Razgrad	2023–24	Bulgarian First League	1	0	0	0	0	0	—		1	0
Ludogorets Razgrad	2024–25	Bulgarian First League	1	0	0	0	0	0	—		1	0
Ludogorets Razgrad	Total		3	0	0	0	0	0	—		3	0
Career total			188	40	0	0	0	0	0	0	188	40
