= Stoyan Stoichkov =

Bulgarian footballer

Personal information
- Full name: Stoyan Krastev Stoichkov
- Date of birth: 18 July 2003 (age 23)
- Place of birth: Pazardzhik, Bulgaria
- Height: 1.82 m (6 ft 0 in)
- Position: Midfielder

Team information
- Current team: Septemvri Sofia
- Number: 28

Youth career
- –2017: Botev Plovdiv
- 2017–2019: DIT Academy
- 2019–2021: Septemvri Sofia

Senior career*
Years	Team	Apps	(Gls)
2020–2021	Septemvri Sofia	7	(0)
2022–2025	CSKA 1948 III	24	(4)
2022–2025	CSKA 1948 II	37	(5)
2022–2025	CSKA 1948	4	(1)
2023	→ Hebar (loan)	11	(1)
2025–	Septemvri Sofia	25	(1)

International career
2021	Bulgaria U19	3	(0)
2022–2024	Bulgaria U21	3	(0)
- * Club domestic league appearances and goals as of 26 May 2026

Stoyan Krastev Stoichkov (Bulgarian: Стоян Кръстев Стоичков; born 18 July 2003) is a Bulgarian footballer who plays as a midfielder for Septemvri Sofia.

== Career ==
Stoichkov began his youth career in Septemvri Sofia. In 2020 he was moved to the main team, before joining CSKA 1948 on 29 December 2021. In the summer of 2022 Lyuboslav Penev took him to the first team. He made his professional debut for CSKA 1948 on 9 July 2022 in a league win over Levski Sofia.

On 17 June 2024 he returned to his homeground team Septemvri Sofia.

== International career ==
In September 2022 he received his first call up for Bulgaria U21 for the friendly matches against Hungary U21 and Serbia U21 on 23 and 27 September.

== Career statistics ==
=== Club ===
As of 23 March 2021

Club performance			League		Cup		Continental		Other		Total	
Club	League	Season	Apps	Goals	Apps	Goals	Apps	Goals	Apps	Goals	Apps	Goals
Bulgaria			League		Bulgarian Cup		Europe		Other (Note: Includes Bulgarian Supercup matches.)		Total	
Septemvri Sofia	Second League	2021–22	7	0	2	1	–		–		9	1
Septemvri Sofia	Total		7	0	2	1	0	0	0	0	9	1
CSKA 1948 II	Second League	2021–22	13	4	–		–		–		13	4
CSKA 1948 II	Second League	2022–23	4	0	–		–		–		4	0
CSKA 1948 II	Total		17	4	0	0	0	0	0	0	17	4
CSKA 1948	First League	2022–23	2	0	0	0	–		–		2	0
CSKA 1948	Total		2	0	0	0	0	0	0	0	2	0
Career statistics			26	4	2	1	0	0	0	0	28	5
