= Boris Dimitrov (footballer, born 2004) =

Bulgarian footballer (born 2004)

Personal information
- Full name: Boris Aleksandrov Dimitrov
- Date of birth: 29 March 2004 (age 22)
- Place of birth: Ruse, Bulgaria
- Height: 1.83 m (6 ft 0 in)
- Positions: Forward; attacking midfielder

Team information
- Current team: CSKA 1948
- Number: 18

Youth career
- –2020: Dunav Ruse
- 2020–2023: Slavia Sofia

Senior career*
Years	Team	Apps	(Gls)
2019–2020	Dunav Ruse	2	(0)
2021–2023	Slavia II	32	(17)
2021–2023	Slavia Sofia	4	(0)
2023	→ Sportist Svoge (loan)	15	(0)
2023–2024	Chavdar Etropole	18	(11)
2024–2025	CSKA 1948 II	42	(18)
2024–	CSKA 1948	11	(2)
2025–2026	→ Montana (loan)	34	(9)

International career
2020	Bulgaria U17	2	(0)
2022	Bulgaria U19	8	(1)
2024–	Bulgaria U21	10	(1)
- * Club domestic league appearances and goals as of 10:57, 27 May 2026 (UTC)

Boris Dimitrov (Bulgarian: Борис Димитров; born 29 March 2004) is a Bulgarian professional footballer who plays as a forward for CSKA 1948 Sofia.

== Career ==
Dimitrov started his career in the local Dunav Ruse academy. In 2019, he was promoted to first team, at age of 15. He made his professional debut for the team in a league match against CSKA Sofia on 14 December 2019. In May 2020 he was close to move to Ludogorets, but two months later he was signed by Slavia Sofia. He mainly played for the second team, before being send on loan to Sportist Svoge in 2023. In the summer of 2023 he was transferred to Chavdar Etropole. After a strong start of the season with the team, on 9 January 2024 he signed with CSKA 1948.

On 29 June 2025, he was sent on loan to the newly promoted to First League team Montana until the end of the season.
