= Vladislav Naydenov =

Bulgarian footballer

Personal information
- Full name: Vladislav Sevdalinov Naydenov
- Date of birth: 29 November 2001 (age 24)
- Place of birth: Vratsa, Bulgaria
- Height: 1.67 m (5 ft 6 in)
- Position: Forward

Team information
- Current team: Botev Vratsa
- Number: 97

Youth career
- Botev Vratsa
- Ludogorets Razgrad

Senior career*
Years	Team	Apps	(Gls)
2019–2024	Ludogorets Razgrad II	112	(24)
2021–2024	Ludogorets Razgrad	2	(0)
2023–2024	→ Etar (loan)	13	(0)
2024–	Botev Vratsa	40	(1)
- * Club domestic league appearances and goals as of 11 June 2026

Vladislav Naydenov (Bulgarian: Владислав Найденов; born 29 November 2001) is a Bulgarian professional footballer who plays as a forward for Botev Vratsa.

== Career ==
Naydenov completed his league debut for Ludogorets Razgrad on 26 May 2021 in a match against CSKA 1948.

== Career statistics ==
As of match played 26 May 2024

Appearances and goals by club, season and competition
Club	Season	League			Cup		Europe		Other		Total	
Club	Season	Division	Apps	Goals	Apps	Goals	Apps	Goals	Apps	Goals	Apps	Goals
Ludogorets Razgrad	2017–18	Bulgarian First League	0	0	0	0	—		—		0	0
Ludogorets Razgrad	2020–21	Bulgarian First League	1	0	0	0	0	0	0	0	1	0
Ludogorets Razgrad	2021–22	Bulgarian First League	0	0	1	0	0	0	0	0	1	0
Ludogorets Razgrad	2023–24	Bulgarian First League	1	0	0	0	0	0	0	0	1	0
Ludogorets Razgrad	2024–25	Bulgarian First League	0	0	0	0	0	0	0	0	0	0
Ludogorets Razgrad	Total		2	0	1	0	0	0	0	0	3	0
Ludogorets Razgrad II	2019–20	Bulgarian Second League	9	0	—		—		—		9	0
Ludogorets Razgrad II	2020–21	Bulgarian Second League	28	3	—		—		—		28	3
Ludogorets Razgrad II	2021–22	Bulgarian Second League	33	12	—		—		—		33	12
Ludogorets Razgrad II	2022–23	Bulgarian Second League	32	8	—		—		—		32	8
Ludogorets Razgrad II	2023–24	Bulgarian Second League	10	1	—		—		—		10	1
Ludogorets Razgrad II	Total		112	24	—		—		—		112	24
Etar VT (loan)	2023–24	Bulgarian First League	13	0	—		—		—		13	0
Career total			127	24	1	0	0	0	0	0	128	24
