= Veselin Branimirov =

Bulgarian footballer and coach

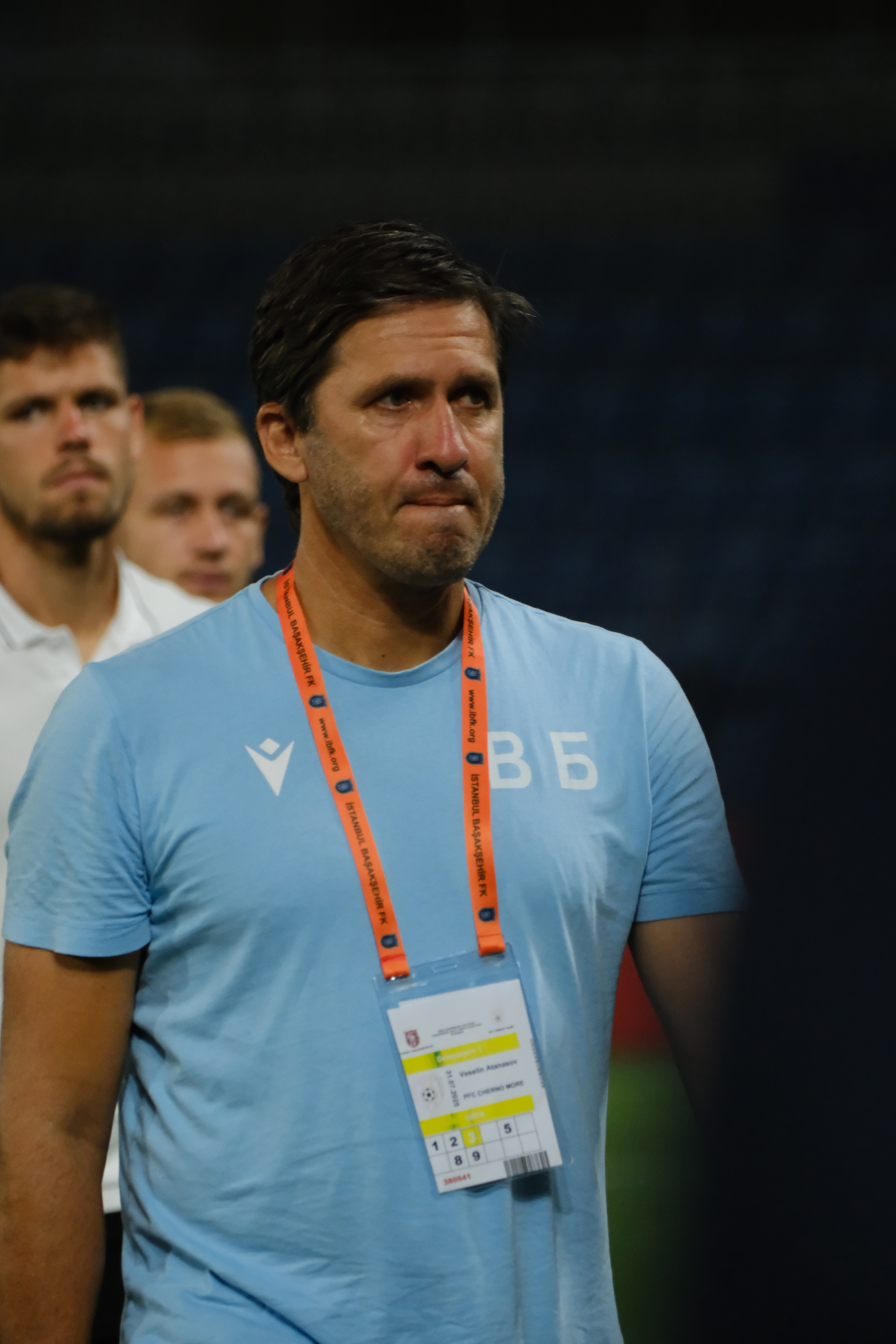

Personal information
- Full name: Veselin Branimirov Atanasov
- Date of birth: 25 August 1975 (age 51)
- Place of birth: Varna, Bulgaria
- Height: 1.80 m (5 ft 11 in)
- Position: Defender

Team information
- Current team: Cherno More (assistant)

Senior career*
Years	Team	Apps	(Gls)
1992–1995	Cherno More	36	(1)
1996–2005	Neftochimic	201	(1)
2005	Tobol	5	(0)
2006	Neftochimic	16	(0)
Total		258	(2)

International career
1995–1996	Bulgaria U21	5	(0)
2000–2001	Bulgaria	3	(0)

Managerial career
- 2011–2012: Levski Sofia (assistant)
- 2014–2015: Tosno (assistant)
- 2015: Ludogorets Razgrad (youth coach)
- 2015: Ludogorets Razgrad II
- 2017–2018: Pomorie
- 2018–2019: Riga (assistant)
- 2019–2022: Zorya Luhansk (assistant)
- 2023–: Cherno More (assistant)
- * Club domestic league appearances and goals

Veselin Branimirov Atanasov (Bulgarian: Веселин Бранимиров Атанасов; born 25 August 1975) is a Bulgarian football coach and a former player who is assistant manager of Cherno More. A defender, he had caps at international level for the Bulgaria national team.

== Playing career ==
Branimirov was born in Varna. In his club career, he played for Cherno More Varna (1994–95), Neftochimic Burgas (1995–2005 and 2006) and Kazakhstani side Tobol (2005). In January 2007, at the age of 31, he retired from football because of a waist injury.

== Coaching career ==
On 27 September 2017, Branimirov was appointed as manager of Second League club Pomorie. Between 5 July 2018 and 5 February 2019 he was senior assistant coach of Viktor Skrypnyk in Latvian side Riga FC and won a double - champion of Latvian Higher League and a Latvian Cup winner for 2018 - first time in the history of the club. On 3 June 2019, he followed Skrypnyk on his new appointment with Ukrainian Zorya Luhansk. They finished third in 2019–20 Ukrainian Premier League and qualified for 2020–21 UEFA Europa League group stage.

== Managerial statistics ==
As of 6 December 2015

Team	From	To	Record							
Team	From	To	G	W	D	L	Win %	GF	GA	GD
(Bulgaria) Ludogorets Razgrad II	1 July 2015	8 December 2015	17	5	3	9	29.41	22	26	-4
Total			17	5	3	9	29.41	22	26	-4

== Honours ==
=== Player ===
Neftochimic Burgas

- A PFG runner-up: 1996–97
- Bulgarian Cup runner-up: 2000
