= Atanas Apostolov =

Bulgarian footballer

Personal information
- Full name: Atanas Georgiev Apostolov
- Date of birth: 11 March 1989 (age 37)
- Place of birth: Stara Zagora, Bulgaria
- Height: 2.02 m (6 ft 7 1/2 in)
- Position: Winger

Team information
- Current team: Rozova Dolina (manager)

Senior career*
Years	Team	Apps	(Gls)
2007–2009	Beroe	35	(5)
2009	Sliven 2000	3	(0)
2010–2011	Beroe	12	(0)
2011	→ Lyubimets 2007 (loan)	5	(0)
2011	Sliven 2000	4	(0)
2012	Akademik Sofia	11	(0)
2012	Vereya	11	(3)
2013–2021	Rozova Dolina	?	(?)

Managerial career
- 2018–2021: Rozova Dolina (player-manager)
- 2021: CSKA 1948 II
- 2021–: Rozova Dolina
- * Club domestic league appearances and goals as of 1 August 2014

Atanas Apostolov (Bulgarian: Атанас Апостолов; born 11 March 1989) is a Bulgarian football manager and former footballer, who currently is head coach of Rozova Dolina.

== Playing career ==
Apostolov joined Beroe when he was eight years old and signed his first contract in 2006. He made his A PFG debut on 10 October 2007 in a 1–0 away defeat against CSKA Sofia. Apostolov would play in 18 more league matches during the season, scoring two goals. In June 2009 he was transferred to OFC Sliven 2000, but six months later returned to Beroe. In the end of the 2009–10 season he and his team won the Bulgarian Cup.

== Managerial career ==
In July 2018, Apostolov was announced as the new manager of Rozova Dolina, staying in the club also as a player. He led the team to first major title winning the Cup of Bulgarian Amateur Football League. In June 2021 he was announced to join the CSKA 1948 technical crew. On 27 July 2021 he was announced as the new manager of CSKA 1948 II, after Miroslav Mindev was promoted as manager to the first team. On 14 September 2021 he left CSKA 1948 II by mutual consent.

== Honours ==
=== Club ===
- Beroe
  - Bulgarian Cup: 2009–10
- Rozova Dolina
  - Cup of Bulgarian Amateur Football League: 2020–21
