= Aimar Govea =

Ecuadorian footballer (born 2006)

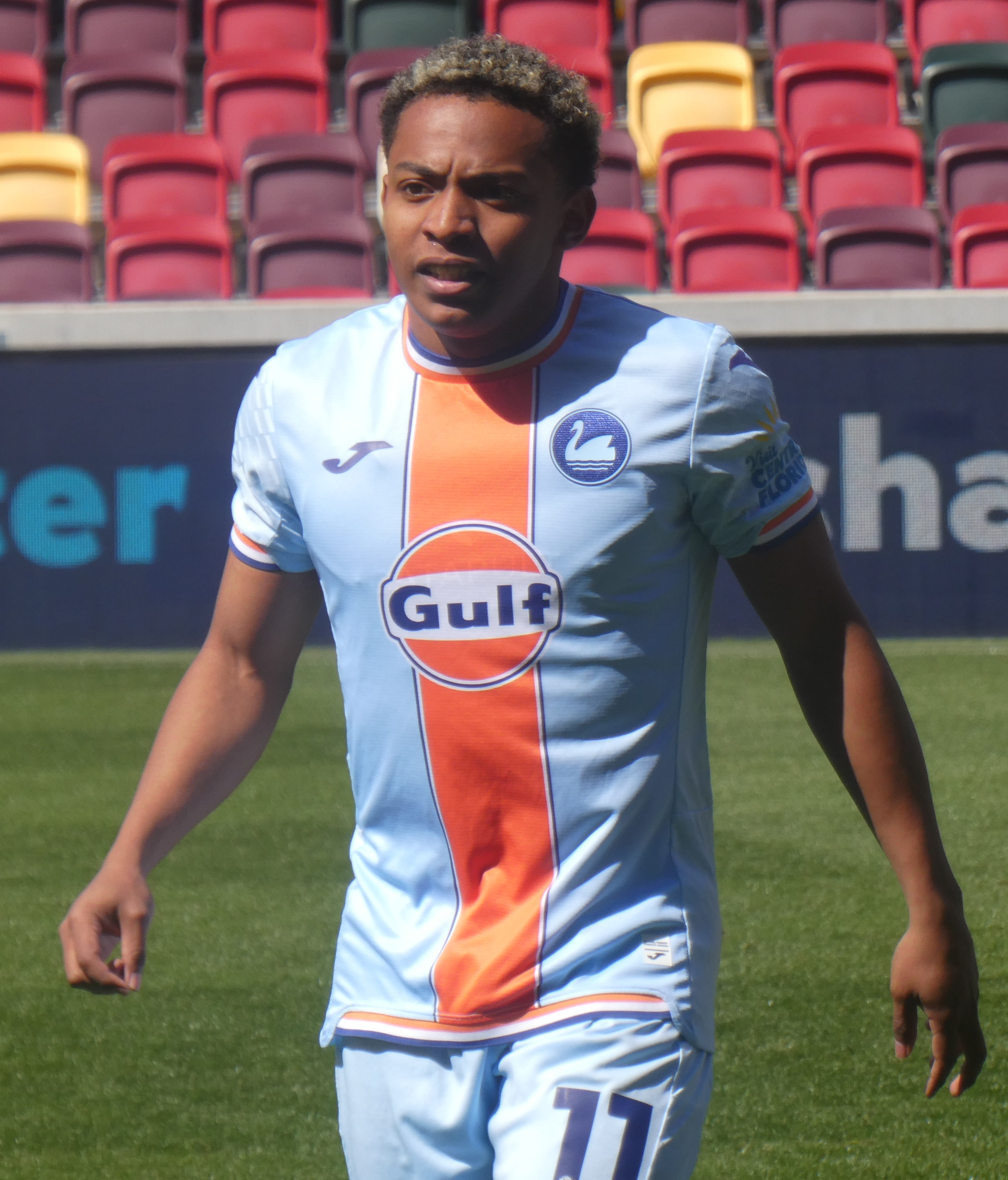
- Govea playing for Swansea City in 2026

Personal information
- Full name: David Aimar Govea Merlín
- Date of birth: 8 June 2006 (age 20)
- Place of birth: Madrid, Spain
- Position: Winger

Team information
- Current team: Swansea City
- Number: 37

Youth career
- 2018–: Swansea City

Senior career*
Years	Team	Apps	(Gls)
2024–	Swansea City	5	(0)
2025–2026	→ Girona B (loan)	1	(0)

International career
2022–	Ecuador U17	7	(0)
- * Club domestic league appearances and goals as of 17:39, 14 June 2026 (UTC)

David Aimar Govea Merlín (born 8 June 2006) is an Ecuadorian professional footballer who plays as a winger for EFL Championship club Swansea City.

== Career ==
Born in Spain, Govea moved to Swansea in 2018 when elder brother Jordi joined the club, Aimar joining the academy at under-13s level upon recommendation from his brother. In July 2022, he signed an academy scholarship with the club having progressed through the youth development phase.

In March 2024, Govea signed a first professional contract with Swansea City. Prior to signing the contract, he had been subject to reported interest from Premier League clubs Arsenal and Newcastle United. On 29 March 2024, he made his senior debut, replacing Jamie Paterson in a 1–1 draw with Sheffield Wednesday.

On 30 August 2025, Govea joined Segunda Federación – Group 3 club Girona B on a season-long loan deal. Having been limited to just one appearance due to injury, he returned to Swansea City in January 2026. On 15 May 2026, he signed a six-month contract extension.

== International career ==
In December 2022, having already made his debut for the Ecuador U17 side, Govea was selected for a training camp with the Spain U17 squad, whom he was eligible to represent as they were the country of his birth.

In March 2023, Govea was once again selected for the Ecuador U17 squad for the upcoming 2023 South American U-17 Championship.

== Career statistics ==
As of match played 1 April 2024

Appearances and goals by club, season and competition
Club	Season	League			FA Cup		League Cup		Other		Total	
Club	Season	Division	Apps	Goals	Apps	Goals	Apps	Goals	Apps	Goals	Apps	Goals
Swansea City	2023–24	Championship	2	0	0	0	0	0	—		2	0
Career total			2	0	0	0	0	0	0	0	2	0

== Personal life ==
Govea is the younger brother of fellow footballer Jordi Govea who plays for Bulgarian club Beroe.
