= PFC Ludogorets Razgrad II =

Bulgarian football club

Ludogorets II
- Full name: Professional Football Club Ludogorets Razgrad II
- Nickname: The Eagles
- Short name: Ludogorets II
- Founded: 2015; 11 years ago
- Ground: Eagles' Nest, Razgrad
- Capacity: 2,000
- Owner: Kiril Domuschiev
- Chairman: Aleksandar Aleksandrov
- Head coach: Ivan Stoyanov
- League: Second League
- 2025–26: Second League, 8th of 17
- Website: ludogorets.com
Home colours	Away colours	Third colours

Ludogorets II (Bulgarian: Лудогорец II) or Ludogorets 2 is a Bulgarian professional football team based in Razgrad. Founded in 2015, it is the reserve team of PFC Ludogorets Razgrad, and currently plays in Second League, the second level of Bulgarian football.

Obliged to play one level below their main side, Ludogorets II is ineligible for promotion to First League and also cannot compete in the Bulgarian Cup.

== History ==
=== Foundation ===
In the beginning of 2015, the Bulgarian Football Union discussed the idea to add the reserve sides of several A Group clubs in the B Group or in the lower regional divisions. Ludogorets Razgrad, Litex Lovech, Levski Sofia, CSKA Sofia, Cherno More Varna and Botev Plovdiv expressed such interest to have a team in the B Group. At the beginning of June 2015, the BFU announced that only Litex and Ludogorets have sent such applications. Eventually, Ludogorets II and Litex II were added to the 2015-16 B Group.

=== 2015–present: Second League ===
The team finished on 7th position in their first season. The team started the 2016–17 season precariously and finished in the relegation zone after the half season. That's why on 12 January 2017, the team announced Radoslav Zdravkov, a Bulgarian football legend and also frequent assistant coach in the Bulgarian national team in recent age. 2 days later from Ludogorets announced that in order to get better results from second team, they would apply big changes. Radoslav Zdravkov was announced as a head coach with Galin Ivanov and Marcelo Chagas for assistants and one other Bulgarian legend, Spas Dzhevizov, was announced as a selectionist, and will look after for youth talents from Ludogorets Academy and other academies to join the team.

On 29 March 2017, the new youth stadium, Eagles' Nest was finished and the second team would play on it. The stadium has 2,000 seats.

From the 2017–18 season, Ludogorets change the politic about the second team by taking the decision to play with only youth players of the club in the Bulgarian Second League. The team started the season against Lokomotiv Sofia and beat them with 2:1 result with a team average age being 19 years.

In the 2020–21 season, the team finished on their highest league position and ended the season on 4th place.

== Players ==
As of 10 August 2026

Note: Flags indicate national team as defined under FIFA eligibility rules; some limited exceptions apply. Players may hold more than one non-FIFA nationality.

No.	Pos.	Nation	Player
34	MF	BUL	Nikolay Nikolov
42	DF	BUL	Simeon Shishkov
58	DF	BUL	Aleksandar Valekov
59	DF	BUL	Aleks Lukanov
62	MF	BUL	Dimitar Ivanov
65	GK	BUL	Valentin Valentinov
69	GK	BUL	Zlatomir Stoimenov
75	MF	RUS	Yelisey Syrov

No.	Pos.	Nation	Player
76	FW	BUL	Konstantin Dimitrov
81	MF	BUL	Georgi Penev
83	MF	BUL	Rayan Ivanov
86	GK	BUL	Rostislav Gyokov
91	FW	BUL	Petar Lyutskanov
93	FW	BUL	Yoan Yordanov
97	FW	BUL	Kristiyan Nikolov
98	DF	BUL	Nasko Yanev

== Personnel ==
=== Manager history ===
Dates	Name	Honours
2015	(Bulgaria) Veselin Branimirov	
2015–2017	(Bulgaria) Galin Ivanov	
2017–2019	(Bulgaria) Radoslav Zdravkov	
2019	(Bulgaria) Radoslav Komitov	
2019–2023	(Bulgaria) Todor Zhivondov	
2024–2025	(Bulgaria) Zahari Sirakov	
2025–2026	(Bulgaria) Todor Zhivondov	
2026–	(Bulgaria) Ivan Stoyanov	

=== Current technical body ===
Position	Name	Nationality
Selectionist	Ivan Tsvetkov	(Bulgaria)
Head coach	Todor Zhivondov	(Bulgaria)
Assistant coach	Valeri Venkov	(Bulgaria)
Goalkeeper coach	Viktor Georgiev	(Bulgaria)
Physiotherapist	Detelin Maslov	(Bulgaria)
Doctor	Ivaylo Yakimov	(Bulgaria)
Administrator	Nikolay Tsonev	(Bulgaria)

== Past seasons ==
Results of league and cup competitions by season
Season	League											Top goalscorer	
Season	Division	Level	P	W	D	L	F	A	GD	Pts	Pos	Top goalscorer	
2015–16	B Group	2	30	12	5	13	41	41	+0	41	7th	(Bulgaria) Yanaki Smirnov	11
2016–17	Second League	2	30	13	5	12	39	33	+6	44	8th	(Bulgaria) Tsvetelin Chunchukov	6
2017–18	Second League	2	30	11	7	12	40	50	-10	40	9th	(Bulgaria) Denislav Aleksandrov	8
2018–19	Second League	2	30	9	5	16	31	43	-12	32	11th	(Bulgaria) Denislav Aleksandrov	6
2019–20	Second League	2	21	5	9	7	20	35	-15	24	12th	(Bulgaria) Dimitar Mitkov	10
2020–21	Second League	2	30	14	8	8	56	38	+18	50	4th	(Bulgaria) Dimitar Mitkov	14
2021–22	Second League	2	36	18	7	11	70	48	+22	61	6th	(Bulgaria) Vladislav Naydenov	12
2022–23	Second League	2	34	17	6	11	42	35	+7	57	4th	(Bulgaria) Vladislav Naydenov (Bulgaria) Hyusein Kelyovluev	9
2023–24	Second League	2	34	11	11	12	39	39	+0	44	12th	(Bulgaria) Yoan Yordanov	8
2024–25	Second League	2	38	13	12	13	53	42	+11	51	12th	(Bulgaria) Hyusein Kelyovluev	14
2025–26	Second League	2											

Key

- GS = Group stage
- QF = Quarter-finals
- SF = Semi-finals

Champions	Runners-up	Promoted	Relegated

== Statistics ==
=== Second League matches ===
As of 29 May 2026

Ranking	Nationality	Position	Name	Years	Matches	Goals
1	Bulgaria	MF	**Metodiy Stefanov**	2019–	211	7
2	Bulgaria	MF	Hyusein Kelyovluev	2017–2025	185	40
3	Bulgaria	DF	Dimitar Iliev	2017–2021; 2022–2024	141	0
—	Bulgaria	MF	Branimir Kostadinov	2019–2024	141	17
5	Bulgaria	MF	Tsvetoslav Petrov	2017–2024	140	29
6	Bulgaria	FW	**Yoan Yordanov**	2022–	119	16
7	Bulgaria	GK	Damyan Hristov	2020–2026	113	0
8	Bulgaria	FW	Vladislav Naydenov	2019–2024	112	24
9	Bulgaria	DF	Tihomir Dimitrov	2017–2023	110	6
10	Bulgaria	MF	**Aleks Lukanov**	2020–	103	5

- Players in **bold** are still playing for Ludogorets.

=== Second League goals ===
As of 29 May 2026

Ranking	Nationality	Position	Name	Years	Matches	Goals
1	Bulgaria	MF	Hyusein Kelyovluev	2017–2025	185	40
2	Bulgaria	FW	Dimitar Mitkov	2019–2022	64	32
3	Bulgaria	FW	Tsvetoslav Petrov	2017–2024	140	29
4	Bulgaria	MF	Vladislav Naydenov	2019–2024	112	24
5	Bulgaria	FW	Denislav Aleksandrov	2015–2019	77	19
6	Bulgaria	FW	Branimir Kostadinov	2020–2024	141	17
7	Bulgaria	FW	**Yoan Yordanov**	2022–	90	16
8	Bulgaria	MF	Ilker Budinov	2018–2022	101	14
9	Bulgaria	FW	Yanaki Smirnov	2015–2016	28	11
10	Bulgaria	MF	Svetoslav Kovachev	2015–2018	54	10
—	Bulgaria	FW	**Petar Kirev**	2023–	61	10

- Players in **bold** are still playing for Ludogorets.

== Notable players ==
Note: This list includes players that have appeared in at least 100 top league games and/or have reached international status and have played at least 10 games for Ludogorets II. Players whose name is listed in bold represented their countries.

- (Bulgaria) **Denislav Aleksandrov**
- (Bulgaria) Georgi Argilashki
- (Bulgaria) **Tsvetelin Chunchukov**
- (Bulgaria) Erol Dost
- (Bulgaria) Antonio Georgiev
- (Bulgaria) Ventsislav Kerchev
- (Bulgaria) Branimir Kostadinov
- (Bulgaria) **Svetoslav Kovachev**
- (Bulgaria) **Daniel Naumov**
- (Bulgaria) Hristo Popadiyn
- (Bulgaria) Slavcho Shokolarov
- (Bulgaria) **Georgi Terziev**
- (Bulgaria) **Aleksandar Vasilev**
- (Bulgaria) **Dominik Yankov**
- (Bulgaria) **Ivan Yordanov**
- (Brazil) Choco
- (Brazil) **Igor Thiago**
- (Brazil) Raí Nascimento
- (Colombia) Brayan Angulo
- (Portugal) Vitinha
