= Dylan Silva =

Cape Verdean footballer (born 1999)

Personal information
- Full name: Dylan Ayrton Garcia da Silva
- Date of birth: 10 February 1999 (age 27)
- Place of birth: Marseille, France
- Height: 1.94 m (6 ft 4 in)
- Position: Goalkeeper

Youth career
- 2012–2016: Sporting CP
- 2013: →Loures (loan)
- 2016–2018: Belenenses
- 2018–2020: Benfica

Senior career*
Years	Team	Apps	(Gls)
2020–2021	Fátima	3	(0)
2021	Felgueiras 1932	0	(0)
2021–2022	Portimonense	0	(0)
2022–2023	B-SAD	0	(0)
2023–2024	Sintrense	15	(0)
2024	Sportist Svoge	5	(0)
2025	IFK Mariehamn	1	(0)

International career^{‡}
2018	Portugal U19	1	(0)
- * Club domestic league appearances and goals as of 28 July 2025 ‡ National team caps and goals as of 02:33, 10 November 2023 (UTC)

Dylan Ayrton Garcia da Silva (born 10 February 1999) is a professional footballer who plays as a goalkeeper. Born in France and raised in Portugal, he has opted to play for the Cape Verde national team.

== Club career ==
Silva is a youth product of the Portuguese clubs Sporting CP, Loures, Belenenses before signing a contract with Benfica on 4 July 2018. He began his senior career with Fátima in the Campeonato de Portugal on 2020, before moving to Felgueiras 1932 on 4 February 2021. He spent the 2021–22 season with the reserves of Portimonense. The following season, he moved to B-SAD. On 14 October 2022, he made his professional debut with B-SAD in a 2–0 Taça de Portugal win over Olhanense. On 21 August 2023, he transferred to Sintrense.

After a stint with Sportist Svoge in Bulgarian Second League, Silva signed with Veikkausliiga club IFK Mariehamn on 8 May 2025.

== International career ==
Silva was born in France to Cape Verdean parents, and moved to Portugal at a young age. He made one appearance for the Portugal U19s in a friendly 4–0 win over the Hungary U19s on 21 February 2018. In August 2021, he was called up to the Cape Verde national team for the first time for a set of 2022 FIFA World Cup qualification matches.
