= Svetoslav Kovachev =

Bulgarian footballer (born 1998)

Personal information
- Full name: Svetoslav Svetlozarov Kovachev
- Date of birth: 14 March 1998 (age 28)
- Place of birth: Pleven, Bulgaria
- Height: 1.72 m (5 ft 7 1/2 in)
- Position: Winger

Team information
- Current team: Arda Kardzhali
- Number: 10

Youth career
- 2008–2010: Svoboda Milkovitsa
- 2010–2011: Spartak Pleven
- 2011–2016: Ludogorets Razgrad

Senior career*
Years	Team	Apps	(Gls)
2015–2018	Ludogorets Razgrad II	54	(10)
2016–2021	Ludogorets Razgrad	10	(0)
2018–2019	→ Dunav Ruse (loan)	28	(5)
2019	→ Etar (loan)	19	(0)
2020	→ Arda Kardzhali (loan)	24	(5)
2021–2024	Arda Kardzhali	61	(12)
2023–2024	→ Akhmat Grozny (loan)	24	(3)
2024–2025	Akhmat Grozny	10	(0)
2025	→ Arda Kardzhali (loan)	14	(4)
2025–	Arda Kardzhali	29	(1)

International career^{‡}
2015–2016	Bulgaria U17	3	(0)
2016–2018	Bulgaria U19	15	(0)
2018–2020	Bulgaria U21	7	(0)
2020–	Bulgaria	6	(1)
- * Club domestic league appearances and goals as of 11 June 2026 ‡ National team caps and goals as of 16 November 2026

Svetoslav Svetlozarov Kovachev (Bulgarian: Светослав Светлозаров Ковачев; born 14 March 1998) is a Bulgarian professional footballer who plays as a winger for First League club Arda Kardzhali.

His younger brother Lachezar is also a footballer, currently playing for Spartak Pleven.

== Career ==
=== Ludogorets Razgrad ===
Born in Pleven, Kovachev started his career in Svoboda Milkovitsa. He joined Ludogorets in 2011 recruited by the Bulgarian legend Plamen Getov. In 2014, he played for Ludogorets U19 in the UEFA Youth League, being a starter in all of the 6 matches.

He made his debut for Ludogorets Razgrad II on 6 December 2015 in a match against FC Pirin Razlog.

On 22 May 2016 he made his complete debut in A Group for Ludogorets in a match against Beroe Stara Zagora.

Kovachev started the 2017–18 season in Ludogorets II by scoring a goal in the first match of the season against Lokomotiv 1929 Sofia. On 29 July 2017 he played for the main team in the 0–0 draw against Lokomotiv Plovdiv coming as a substitute in the First League match. Kovachev was on the bench for the Europa League group stage match against İstanbul Başakşehir, but stayed as an unused substitute. On 21 September 2017 he made his debut for the Bulgarian Cup in the first round against Oborishte.

Kovachev was named captain for the Ludogorets U19 team in the UEFA Youth League in the first match from the Domestic Champions Path against Željezničar U19 on 27 September 2017.

On 15 February 2018 Kovachev was named on bench for the Europa League Round of 32 match against Milan and made his debut as a substitute in the 81st minute.

==== Loan to Dunav ====
In June 2018, Kovachev was loaned to Dunav Ruse, although he spend the pre-season camp with Ludogorets first team. He made his debut for the team in the first league match of the season against Vitosha Bistritsa on 20 July 2018, assisting for the only goal for Dunav.

On 4 November 2018 he scored his first goal for the team in First League, netting the second goal for the 3:0 win over Vitosha Bistritsa.

=== Arda Kardzhali ===
Kovachev joined Arda Kardzhali on a year long loan on 6 January 2020. He returned to Ludogorets team in end of December 2020, having a contract with Razgrad team until July 2021, which he didn't extend. In February 2021 he signed a 3-year pre-contract with Arda, from July 2021, leaving him out of Ludogorets team until end of the season.

==== Loan to Akhmat Grozny ====
On 3 August 2023, Kovachev joined Russian Premier League club Akhmat Grozny on a season-long loan with an option to buy.

On 8 July 2025, Kovachev's contract with Akhmat was mutually terminated.

=== Return to Arda Kardzhali ===
On 21 July 2025, it was confirmed that Kovachev had rejoined Arda, signing a three-year contract. On 14 August 2025, he scored the second goal in the 2:0 return leg win over Lithuanian team Kauno Žalgiris in a UEFA Conference League qualifying match, which marked Arda's first home victory in a European club tournament.

== International career ==
=== Youth levels ===
Kovachev was called up for the Bulgaria U19 team for the 2017 European Under-19 Championship qualification from 22 to 27 March 2017. After a draw and 2 wins the team qualified for the knockout phase which will be held in July 2017.

Kovachev made his debut for Bulgaria U21 on 27 March 2018 in a European Under-21 qualification match against Kazakhstan U21, keeping a clean sheet for the 3:0 win.

=== Senior ===
Kovachev received his first call-up for senior Bulgarian squad on 29 August 2018 for the UEFA Nations League matches against Slovenia and Norway on 6 and 9 September. He earned his first cap on 26 February 2020, coming on as a substitute for Ismail Isa during the second half of the 0:1 home loss against Belarus in a friendly game.

== Career statistics ==
=== Club ===
As of match played 7 April 2025

Appearances and goals by club, season and competition
Club	Season	League			Cup		Continental		Other		Total	
Club	Season	Division	Apps	Goals	Apps	Goals	Apps	Goals	Apps	Goals	Apps	Goals
Ludogorets Razgrad II	2015–16	B Group	11	2	—		—		—		11	2
Ludogorets Razgrad II	2016–17	Second League	19	2	—		—		—		19	2
Ludogorets Razgrad II	2017–18	Second League	24	6	—		—		—		24	6
Ludogorets Razgrad II	Total		54	10	0	0	0	0	0	0	54	10
Ludogorets Razgrad	2015–16	A Group	2	0	0	0	0	0	0	0	2	0
Ludogorets Razgrad	2016–17	First League	3	0	0	0	0	0	0	0	3	0
Ludogorets Razgrad	2017–18	First League	5	0	2	0	1	0	—		8	0
Ludogorets Razgrad	Total		10	0	2	0	1	0	0	0	13	0
Dunav Ruse (loan)	2018–19	First League	28	5	2	0	—		2 (Note: Relegation Play-offs)	0	32	5
Etar Veliko Tarnovo (loan)	2019–20	First League	19	0	1	0	—		—		20	0
Arda Kardzhali (loan)	2019–20	First League	9	2	0	0	—		—		9	2
Arda Kardzhali (loan)	2020–21	First League	15	3	1	0	—		—		16	3
Arda Kardzhali (loan)	Total		24	5	1	0	—		—		25	5
Arda Kardzhali	2021–22	First League	24	4	2	0	2 (Note: Appearances in UEFA Europa Conference League)	0	—		28	4
Arda Kardzhali	2022–23	First League	35	8	3	0	—		—		38	8
Arda Kardzhali	2023–24	First League	2	0	0	0	—		—		2	0
Arda Kardzhali	Total		61	12	5	0	2	0	—		68	12
Akhmat Grozny (loan)	2023–24	Russian Premier League	24	3	7	1	—		—		31	4
Akhmat Grozny	2024–25	Russian Premier League	10	0	6	1	—		—		16	1
Arda Kardzhali	2024–25	First League	7	2	0	0	—		—		7	2
Career total			237	37	24	2	3	0	2	0	266	39

=== National team ===
As of 16 November 2026

Bulgaria national team
Year	Apps	Goals
2020	4	0
2023	1	0
2026	1	1
Total	6	1

Scores and results list Bulgaria's goal tally first, score column indicates score after each Kovachev goal.

List of international goals scored by Svetoslav Kovachev
No.	Date	Venue	Cap	Opponent	Score	Result	Competition
1	16 November 2026	Lilleküla Stadium, Tallinn, Estonia	6	Estonia	1–1	2–1	2026–27 UEFA Nations League C
