= Galin Ivanov =

Galin Ivanov is the name of:

- Galin Ivanov (footballer, born 1975) (born 1975), Bulgarian footballer and now manager
- Galin Ivanov (footballer, born 1988) (born 1988), Bulgarian footballer
