= Ilker Budinov =

Bulgarian footballer

Personal information
- Full name: Ilker Ilkov Budinov
- Date of birth: 11 August 2000 (age 26)
- Place of birth: Targovishte, Bulgaria
- Height: 1.83 m (6 ft 0 in)
- Positions: Left back; left midfielder

Team information
- Current team: Dunav Ruse
- Number: 51

Youth career
- Ludogorets Razgrad

Senior career*
Years	Team	Apps	(Gls)
2018–2022	Ludogorets Razgrad II	100	(14)
2019–2024	Ludogorets Razgrad	2	(0)
2022	→ Spartak Varna (loan)	9	(0)
2023	→ Pirin Blagoevgrad (loan)	10	(1)
2023	→ Etar Veliko Tarnovo (loan)	8	(0)
2024	→ Botev Vratsa (loan)	4	(0)
2024	→ Arda Kardzhali (loan)	11	(1)
2025	Hebar Pazardzhik	6	(0)
2025–2026	Spartak Varna	15	(1)
2026–	Dunav Ruse	0	(0)
- * Club domestic league appearances and goals as of 25 June 2026

Ilker Budinov (Bulgarian: Илкер Будинов; born 11 August 2000) is a Bulgarian professional footballer who plays as a left back or left midfielder for First League club Dunav Ruse.

== Career ==
Budinov made his professional debut for the first team on 25 September 2019 in a cup match against Neftochimic Burgas. He completed his league debut for the club on 12 July in a match against Slavia Sofia.

On 6 June 2022 Budinov was sent on loan to the newly promoted First League team Spartak Varna until the end of the season. In June 2023, he joined Etar Veliko Tarnovo, once again on loan from Ludogorets. In January 2024, he was loaned out to Botev Vratsa, from Ludogorets.

== Career statistics ==
=== Club ===
As of 6 May 2022

Club performance			League		Cup		Continental		Other		Total	
Club	League	Season	Apps	Goals	Apps	Goals	Apps	Goals	Apps	Goals	Apps	Goals
Bulgaria			League		Bulgarian Cup		Europe		Other (Note: Includes Bulgarian Supercup matches.)		Total	
Ludogorets Razgrad II	Second League	2018–19	20	1	–		–		–		20	1
Ludogorets Razgrad II	Second League	2019–20	21	3	–		–		–		21	3
Ludogorets Razgrad II	Second League	2020–21	26	4	–		–		–		26	4
Ludogorets Razgrad II	Second League	2021–22	34	6	–		–		–		34	6
Ludogorets Razgrad II	Total		100	14	0	0	0	0	0	0	100	14
Ludogorets Razgrad	First League	2019–20	1	0	1	0	0	0	0	0	2	0
Ludogorets Razgrad	First League	2020–21	1	0	0	0	0	0	0	0	1	0
Ludogorets Razgrad	First League	2021–22	0	0	1	0	0	0	0	0	1	0
Ludogorets Razgrad	Total		2	0	2	0	0	0	0	0	4	0
Career statistics			102	14	2	0	0	0	0	0	104	14
