= Tsvetoslav Petrov =

Bulgarian footballer

Personal information
- Full name: Tsvetoslav Plamenov Petrov
- Date of birth: 29 May 1999 (age 27)
- Place of birth: Vidin, Bulgaria
- Height: 1.68 m (5 ft 6 in)
- Position: Forward

Team information
- Current team: Chernolomets Popovo
- Number: 13

Youth career
- Ludogorets Razgrad

Senior career*
Years	Team	Apps	(Gls)
2017–2024	Ludogorets Razgrad II	140	(29)
2020–2024	Ludogorets Razgrad	2	(0)
2024	Spartak Varna	6	(0)
2024–2025	Lokomotiv Gorna Oryahovitsa	31	(2)
2025–	Chernolomets Popovo	28	(6)
- * Club domestic league appearances and goals as of 11:18, 29 May 2026 (UTC) ‡ National team caps and goals as of 18:35, 31 October 2020 (UTC)

Tsvetoslav Petrov (Bulgarian: Цветослав Петров; born 29 May 1999) is a Bulgarian footballer who plays as a forward for Chernolomets Popovo.

== Career ==
Petrov made his professional debut for Ludogorets in a league match against Slavia Sofia. In February 2024 he moved to Spartak Varna.

== Career statistics ==
=== Club ===
As of 20 February 2024

Club performance			League		Cup		Continental		Other		Total	
Club	League	Season	Apps	Goals	Apps	Goals	Apps	Goals	Apps	Goals	Apps	Goals
Bulgaria			League		Bulgarian Cup		Europe		Other (Note: Includes Bulgarian Supercup matches.)		Total	
Ludogorets Razgrad II	Second League	2016–17	1	3	–		–		–		1	3
Ludogorets Razgrad II	Second League	2017–18	5	0	–		–		–		5	0
Ludogorets Razgrad II	Second League	2018–19	13	1	–		–		–		13	1
Ludogorets Razgrad II	Second League	2019–20	4	0	–		–		–		4	0
Ludogorets Razgrad II	Second League	2020–21	29	8	–		–		–		29	8
Ludogorets Razgrad II	Second League	2021–22	36	6	–		–		–		36	6
Ludogorets Razgrad II	Second League	2022–23	32	5	–		–		–		32	5
Ludogorets Razgrad II	Second League	2023–24	20	6	–		–		–		20	6
Ludogorets Razgrad II	Total		140	29	0	0	0	0	0	0	140	29
Ludogorets Razgrad	First League	2019–20	1	0	0	0	0	0	0	0	1	0
Ludogorets Razgrad	First League	2020–21	1	0	0	0	0	0	0	0	1	0
Ludogorets Razgrad	First League	2021–22	0	0	0	0	0	0	0	0	0	0
Ludogorets Razgrad	Total		2	0	0	0	0	0	0	0	2	0
Spartak Varna	Second League	2023–24	0	0	0	0	–		–		0	0
Career statistics			142	29	0	0	0	0	0	0	142	29
