= Jordi Govea =

Ecuadorian footballer (born 1999)

Personal information
- Full name: Jordi Jair Govea Merlín
- Date of birth: 9 March 1999 (age 27)
- Place of birth: Esmeraldas, Ecuador
- Height: 1.79 m (5 ft 10 in)
- Positions: Left-back; left winger

Team information
- Current team: Olimpija Ljubljana
- Number: 33

Youth career
- 2005–2010: Colmenar Viejo
- 2010–2011: E.F. Siete Picos
- 2011–2018: Real Madrid
- 2018–2021: Swansea City

Senior career*
Years	Team	Apps	(Gls)
2022–2023	FC Cincinnati 2	6	(0)
2023–2024	Beroe	32	(1)
2024–	Olimpija Ljubljana	14	(0)
- * Club domestic league appearances and goals as of 25 June 2025

Jordi Jair Govea Merlín (born 9 March 1999) is an Ecuadorian professional footballer who plays as a left-back for Olimpija Ljubljana.

== Club career ==
=== Early career ===
Born in Esmeraldas in Ecuador, Govea moved to Spain at the age of three, joining the academy of Colmenar Viejo in 2005, before spending a season with E.F. Siete Picos. It was at Siete Picos where he was scouted and signed by La Liga side Real Madrid, and he would go on to spend seven years with the Madrid-based side.

In July 2018 he joined Welsh side Swansea City, who were then in the Championship, on a free transfer, signing a three-year deal. Govea's time in Swansea was plagued by injury; after playing in a match against Tottenham Hotspur in April 2019, he missed the entirety of the 2019–20 season, and had to wait until February 2021 to make his next appearance for the club's reserve team - a total of 687 days. He marked his return with a goal in a 2–0 win against the under-21 side of Millwall on 30 February 2021.

Having been released at the end of the 2020–21 season, he received offers from clubs in Spain and Poland, before returning to Ecuador and coming close to signing for Emelec. While in Ecuador he trained with Independiente del Valle, but would return to Britain to trial with Birmingham City in early 2022, though this was ultimately unsuccessful, in part due to his injury problems.

=== FC Cincinnati 2 ===
Govea signed with MLS Next Pro side FC Cincinnati 2 on 11 August 2022. In November of the same year his contract came to an end, but he was offered an extension, with the hope that he would fight for a place in the FC Cincinnati squad, despite only making two appearances for the reserves.

=== Beroe ===
After only four appearances the following season, he was linked with a return to Ecuador with Barcelona de Guayaquil. However, he would go on to join Bulgarian side Beroe in August 2023.

On 28 August 2024, Govea joined Slovenian PrvaLiga side Olimpija Ljubljana on a three-year deal.

== Personal life ==
Govea's brother, Aimar, is also a professional footballer, and currently plays for Swansea City.

== Career statistics ==
=== Club ===
As of 27 October 2023.

Appearances and goals by club, season and competition
Club	Season	League			Cup		Other		Total	
Club	Season	Division	Apps	Goals	Apps	Goals	Apps	Goals	Apps	Goals
Swansea U23	2018–19	—			—		2 (Note: Appearances in the EFL Trophy)	0	2	0
FC Cincinnati 2	2022	MLS Next Pro	2	0	0	0	0	0	2	0
FC Cincinnati 2	2023	MLS Next Pro	4	0	0	0	0	0	4	0
FC Cincinnati 2	Total		6	0	0	0	0	0	6	0
Beroe	2023–24	Bulgarian First League	11	0	0	0	0	0	11	0
Career total			17	0	0	0	2	0	19	0
