= Ivan Stoyanov =

Ivan Stoyanov may refer to:

- Ivan Stoyanov (footballer, born 1949) (1949–2017), Bulgarian football midfielder
- Ivan Stoyanov (footballer, born 1983), Bulgarian football winger and midfielder
- Ivan Stoyanov (footballer, born 1994), Bulgarian football defender
- Ivan Stoyanov (long jumper) (born 1969), Bulgarian long jumper
- Ivan Stoyanov (singer), competed for Bulgaria in the Junior Eurovision Song Contest 2015
