= Stadion Chavdar Tsvetkov =

Chavdar Tsvetkov
- Interactive map of Chavdar Tsvetkov
- Full name: Chavdar Tsvetkov Stadium
- Former names: Iskar Stadium
- Location: Svoge, Bulgaria
- Coordinates: 42°57′44″N 23°21′0″E
- Owner: Municipality of Svoge
- Operator: Sportist Svoge
- Capacity: 3,500
- Surface: Grass
- Field size: 100 x 50

Construction
- Built: 1965
- Opened: 1965
- Renovated: 2007
- Expanded: 2009

Tenant
- Sportist Svoge (1965-present)

Chavdar Tsvetkov Stadium (Bulgarian: Стадион „Чавдар Цветков“) is a multi-use stadium in Svoge, Bulgaria. It is currently used mostly for football matches and is the home ground of FC Sportist Svoge. The stadium holds a capacity for 3,500 spectators.

The ground was opened in 1965 as Iskar Stadium. In 2007, the stadium was renovated and it was renamed after the legendary forward of the club Chavdar Tsvetkov.

In 2009, the stadium was expanded to 3,500 spectators in order to meet the BFU's requirements.
