= Miroslav Mindev =

Bulgarian footballer and manager

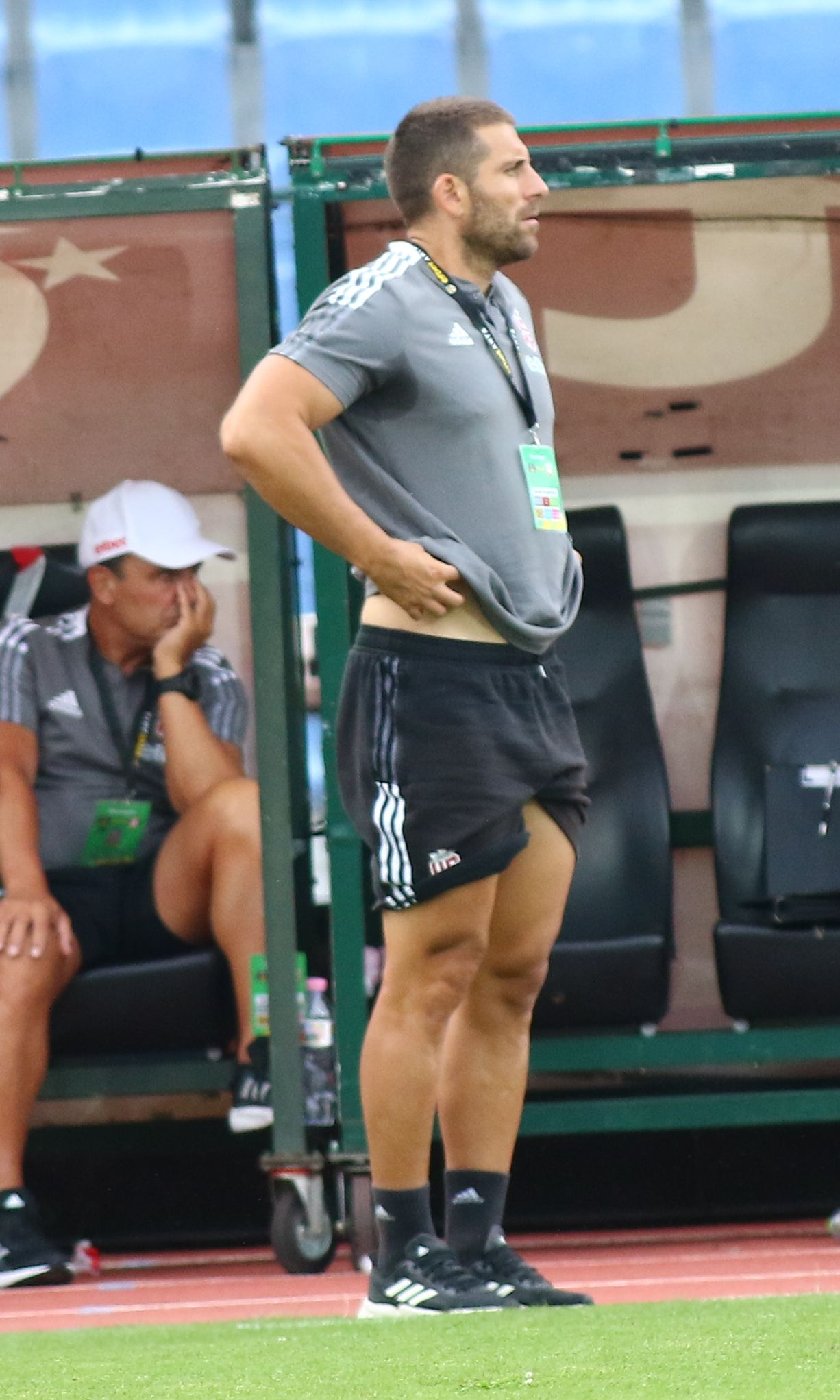

Personal information
- Full name: Miroslav Atanasov Mindev
- Date of birth: 27 July 1980 (age 46)
- Place of birth: Sliven, Bulgaria
- Height: 1.92 m (6 ft 4 in)
- Position: Forward

Team information
- Current team: Zagorets Nova Zagora (manager)

Senior career*
| Years | Team | Apps | (Gls) |
| 1997–1999 | Olimpik Sliven | 38 | (12) |
| 1999 | Naftex Burgas | 1 | (0) |
| 1999 | Armeets Sliven | 6 | (1) |
| 2000–2001 | Beroe | 26 | (2) |
| 2001 | Olimpik Teteven | 15 | (7) |
| 2002 | Cherno More | 15 | (1) |
| 2002–2003 | Sliven 2000 | 28 | (11) |
| 2003–2004 | KS Lushnja | 18 | (1) |
| 2004 | Sliven 2000 | 17 | (11) |
| 2005 | AD Parla | 0 | (0) |
| 2006–2010 | Sliven 2000 | 123 | (56) |
| 2011 | Etar 1924 | 7 | (0) |
| 2011–2013 | Sliven 2000 | 32 | (4) |
| Total | | 326 | (106) |

Managerial career
- 2014–2021: Zagorets Nova Zagora
- 2021: CSKA 1948 II
- 2021: CSKA 1948
- 2022–: Zagorets Nova Zagora
- * Club domestic league appearances and goals as of 12 December 2012

Miroslav Mindev (Bulgarian: Мирослав Миндев; born 27 July 1980) is a former Bulgarian football forward and currently a manager of Zagorets Nova Zagora. Mindev has captained his hometown club.

== Career ==
With Sliven, Mindev became two times the championship's top goalscorer in Bulgarian second division. During the 2006–07 season, he scored 20 goals and over the course of the season 2007–08, he scored 25 goals.

After leading Zagorets Nova Zagora for 7 years, on 29 May 2021 he was announced as the new manager of CSKA 1948 II, but just after one round, on 27 July 2021, he was promoted to CSKA 1948.

== Career honours ==
=== Head coach ===
Zagorets Nova Zagora

Southeastern Third League:

- Winners (1): 2016–17
