= FC CSKA 1948 Sofia II =

CSKA 1948 II
- Full name: Football Club Central Sports Club of the Army 1948 Sofia II
- Nickname: Червените (The Reds)
- Short name: CSKA 1948 II
- Founded: 2019; 7 years ago 2021; 5 years ago (Refounded)
- Dissolved: 2025; 1 year ago
- Ground: Arena Tsarsko Selo
- Capacity: 1,500
- League: Second League
- 2024–25: Second League, 9th of 20
- Website: bg.cska1948.bg
Home colours	Away colours	Third colours

CSKA 1948 II (Bulgarian: ЦСКА 1948 II) or CSKA 1948 2 was a Bulgarian professional football team based in Sofia. Founded in 2019, it is the reserve team of CSKA 1948, and played in Second League, the second level of Bulgarian football, until 2025.

In 2023, the team secured the title in Second League, becoming the first reserve team to become a champion of the league.

== History ==
=== 2019–2020: Foundation ===
Since 2015, the Bulgarian Football Union allowed Bulgarian teams to have reserve sides in the lower regional divisions. In 2019 CSKA 1948 Sofia introduced their reserve team in A OFG Sofia (capital) South, the 4th level of Bulgarian football, led by Kiril Metkov. The team finished on 2nd position, before season was ended due to COVID-19 pandemic. Due to the unknown situation, the team did not play in any league 2020–21 season.

=== 2021–present: Second League ===
On 18 February 2021 one of the main sponsors of FC CSKA 1948, Tzvetomir Naydenov, announced that the reserve team will be introduced in Second League, the second level of Bulgarian football, from 2021-22 season. On 29 May 2021 Miroslav Mindev was announced as the manager of the team, previously leading Zagorets Nova Zagora. On 27 July 2021 Atanas Apostolov was announced as the new manager of the team, after Mindev was promoted as manager to the first team.

On 26 May 2023, the team secured the title in Second League, becoming the first reserve team to become a champion of the league.

== Honours ==
Second League:

- Winners (1): 2022–23

== Statistics ==
=== Second League matches ===
As of 3 July 2025

Ranking	Nationality	Position	Name	Years	Matches	Goals
1	Bulgaria	MF	Steliyan Dobrev	2021–2024	64	8
2	Bulgaria	MF	Georgi Mariyanov	2021–2023	57	2
3	Bulgaria	MF	Kaloyan Strinski	2023–2025	53	5
4	Bulgaria	FW	Valentin Yoskov	2021–2024	51	24
5	Ghana	DF	Christopher Acheampong	2022–2025	47	3
6	Bulgaria	DF	Martin Atanasov	2023–2025	43	2
7	Bulgaria	FW	Boris Dimitrov	2024–2025	42	18
8	Ukraine	DF	Ivaylo Markov	2024–2025	42	10
9	Bulgaria	MF	Aleksandar Asparuhov	2022–2023	38	1
10	Bulgaria	MF	Stoyan Stoichkov	2021–2025	37	5

=== Second League goals ===
As of 3 June 2025

Ranking	Nationality	Position	Name	Years	Matches	Goals
1	Bulgaria	FW	Valentin Yoskov	2021–2024	51	24
2	Bulgaria	FW	Boris Dimitrov	2024–2025	42	18
3	Bulgaria	FW	Denislav Aleksandrov	2021–2023	15	13
4	Ukraine	DF	Ivaylo Markov	2024–2025	42	10
5	Bulgaria	FW	Preslav Antonov	2023–2024	33	8
—	Bulgaria	MF	Steliyan Dobrev	2021–2024	64	8
7	Bulgaria	FW	Mariyan Tonev	2022–2024	30	7
8	Bulgaria	MF	Marto Boychev	2024–2025	24	6
—	Bulgaria	MF	Kristiyan Velichkov	2024–2025	28	6
10	Brazil	FW	Juninho	2022	6	5
–	Bulgaria	MF	Stoyan Stoichkov	2021–2025	34	5
–	Bulgaria	MF	Kaloyan Strinski	2023–2025	53	5

- Players in **bold** are still playing for FC 1948.

== Personnel ==
=== Manager history ===
Dates	Name	Honours
2019–2020	(Bulgaria) Kiril Metkov	
2021	(Bulgaria) Miroslav Mindev	
2021	(Bulgaria) Atanas Apostolov	
2021	(Bulgaria) Roman Tafradzhiev (interim)	
2021–2022	(Bulgaria) Andrey Andreev	
2022	(Bulgaria) Vladimir Dimitrov	
2022	(Bulgaria) Valentin Iliev	
2022–2023	(Bulgaria) Atanas Ribarski	
2023	(Bulgaria) Borislav Kyosev	
2023–2024	(Bulgaria) Valentin Iliev	
2024	(Bulgaria) Aleksandar Aleksandrov	
2024	(Bulgaria) Ivan Ivanov	
2024–2025	(Bulgaria) Borislav Kyosev	
2025	(Bulgaria) Ivan Stoyanov	
2025	(Bulgaria) Aleksandar Aleksandrov	

== Past seasons ==
Results of league and cup competitions by season
Season	League											Top goalscorer	
Season	Division	Level	P	W	D	L	F	A	GD	Pts	Pos	Top goalscorer	
2019–20	A OFG Sofia (capital) South	4	14	12	1	1	79	9	-15	24	2nd		
2021–22	Second League	2	36	12	9	15	53	50	+3	45	12th	(Bulgaria) Valentin Yoskov	9
2022–23	Second League	2	34	22	8	4	60	17	+43	74	1st	(Bulgaria) Valentin Yoskov	15
2023–24	Second League	2	34	13	11	10	39	37	+2	50	7th	(Bulgaria) Boris Dimitrov	4
2024–25	Second League	2	38	16	4	18	51	53	-2	52	9th	(Bulgaria) Boris Dimitrov	14

Key

- GS = Group stage
- QF = Quarter-finals
- SF = Semi-finals

Champions	Runners-up	Promoted	Relegated
