= 2021–22 Second Professional Football League (Bulgaria) =

66th season of the Second Professional Football League (Bulgaria)

Second Professional Football League
- Season: 2021–22
- Dates: 24 July 2021 – 21 May 2022
- Promoted: Septemvri Sofia; Hebar Pazardzhik; Spartak Varna
- Relegated: Septemvri Simitli; Marek Dupnitsa; Neftochimic (disqualified); Levski Lom (withdrawn)
- Matches: 342
- Goals: 871 (2.55 per match)
- Top goalscorer: (Bulgaria) Mariyan Tonev (19 goals)
- Biggest home win: Septemvri Sofia 7−0 Septemvri Simitli
- Biggest away win: Sozopol 0−5 Septemvri Sofia
- Highest scoring: Maritsa 3−5 Spartak Varna; Sportist Svoge 4–4 CSKA 1948 Sofia II
- All statistics correct as of 3 June 2022.

The 2021–22 Second League was the 66th season of the Second League, the second tier of the Bulgarian football league system, and the 6th season under this name and current league structure.

For this season, the league was expanded from 17 to 20 teams, with four teams promoted from the Third League, as well as two reserve teams being added to the league. This makes this season the largest in terms of number of teams competing since the 2011–12 season, when 20 teams competed in two separate divisions.

Due to the COVID-19 pandemic, stadiums were initially limited to 50% capacity, with the spectators also being subject to compliance with social distancing and the wearing of face masks. Since 7 September 2021, only 30% of the stadium could be occupied. In mid September 2021, the Football Union postponed the next three Levski Lom matches (two for the league and one for the Cup) after 12 of the team's players tested positive for the coronavirus. From 14 October 2021, no fans were allowed at the stadiums of the teams based in Sofia Province and Sofia City Province. From 21 October, a prerequisite to fan attendance was the possession of a green certificate, entailing proof of vaccination, recovery from an infection or a negative COVID-19 test. From 24 February 2022, the green pass was no longer required for spectators, though it remained in place for the staff and event organizers. From 21 March 2022, the vaccine pass was abolished for all public activities, including football matches.

On 4 November 2021 the professional football license of Neftochimic was revoked by the Licensing commission of the Bulgarian Football Union as a result of the club not following financial fair play rules and outstanding payments towards personnel and state institutions. In the following days the team was to be removed from the group and its matches annulled. On 19 November the BFU confirmed its decision and removed Neftochimic from the group, annulling all their fixtures played until that point.

On 16 March 2022 Levski Lom decided to discontinue its participation in the league, citing the club's position in the league standings and financial issues. On March 17, as a result of the team`s withdrawal, the sports-technical commission of BFU removed Levski Lom from the group. Team`s results up to that date still count toward the league standings with opponents awarded 3:0 wins for the remainder of the season.

== Teams ==
The following teams have changed division since the 2020–21 season.

=== To Second League ===
Introduced reserve team

- Botev Plovdiv II
- CSKA 1948 II

Promoted from Third League

- Spartak Varna
- Levski Lom
- Marek Dupnitsa
- Maritsa Plovdiv

Relegated from First League

- Etar
- Montana

=== From Second League ===
Relegated to Third League

- Lokomotiv Gorna Oryahovitsa
- Kariana
- Vitosha Bistritsa

Promoted to First League

- Pirin
- Lokomotiv Sofia

== Stadia and locations ==
Location of teams in 2021–22 Second League

Team	City	Stadium	Capacity
Botev II	Plovdiv	Futbolen kompleks Botev 1912	3,500
CSKA 1948 II	Sofia	Bistritsa	2,500
Dobrudzha	Dobrich	Druzhba	12,500
Etar	Veliko Tarnovo	Ivaylo	18,000
Hebar	Pazardzhik	Georgi Benkovski	13,128
Levski	Lom	Dunavski Yunak	2,500
Litex	Lovech	Gradski	8,100
Ludogorets II	Razgrad	Eagles' Nest	2,000
Marek	Dupnitsa	Bonchuk	16,000
Maritsa	Plovdiv	Maritsa	5,000
Minyor	Pernik	Minyor	8,000
Montana	Montana	Ogosta	6,000
Neftochimic	Burgas	efbet Arena	18,037
Septemvri	Simitli	Struma	8,000
Septemvri	Sofia	DIT	2,000
Sozopol	Sozopol	Arena Sozopol	3,500
Spartak	Varna	Spartak	6,000
Sportist	Svoge	Chavdar Tsvetkov	3,500
Strumska Slava	Radomir	Gradski	3,500
Yantra	Gabrovo	Hristo Botev	14,000

== Personnel and sponsorship ==
Note: Flags indicate national team as has been defined under FIFA eligibility rules. Players and managers may hold more than one non-FIFA nationality.

Team	Manager	Captain	Kit manufacturer	Shirt sponsor	Kit sponsor
Botev Plovdiv II	(Bulgaria) Stefan Stoyanov	(Bulgaria) Dimitar Balinov	Uhlsport	WinBet	—
CSKA 1948 II	(Bulgaria) Vladimir Dimitrov	(Bulgaria) Georgi Mariyanov	Adidas	efbet	Bachkovo
Dobrudzha	(Bulgaria) Atanas Atanasov	(Bulgaria) Dimitar Iliev	Uhlsport	Corteva Agriscience	—
Etar	(Bulgaria) Veselin Velikov	(Bulgaria) Zdravko Iliev	Joma	WinBet	—
Hebar	(Bulgaria) Nikolay Mitov	(Bulgaria) Tsvetelin Tonev	Jako	Efbet	Pazardzhik Municipality
Levski Lom	(Bulgaria) Anatoli Tonov	(Bulgaria) Nikolay Hristov	Joma	—	—
Litex	(Bulgaria) Zhivko Zhelev	(Bulgaria) Plamen Nikolov	Givova	WINBET	—
Ludogorets II	(Bulgaria) Todor Zhivondov	(Bulgaria) Tsvetoslav Petrov	Nike	Efbet	Vivacom, Spetema
Marek	(Bulgaria) Vasil Pavlov	(Bulgaria) Aleksandar Bliznakov	Joma	Dupnitsa Municipality	—
Maritsa	(Bulgaria) Nikolay Dimitrov	(Bulgaria) Valeri Domovchiyski	Tenev	—	—
Minyor	(Bulgaria) Hristo Yanev	(Bulgaria) Andreas Vasev	Jumper	Efbet	—
Montana	(Bulgaria) Antoni Zdravkov	(Bulgaria) Ivan Mihov	Joma	efbet	—
Neftochimic	(Bulgaria) Vladimir Ivanov	(Bulgaria) Marin Orlinov	KRASIKO	Masterhaus	Burgas Municipality
Septemvri Simitli	(Bulgaria) Spas Stoimenov	(Bulgaria) Anatoli Luleyski	Joma	Simitli Municipality	—
Septemvri Sofia	(Serbia) Slavko Matić	(Bulgaria) Asen Chandarov	Uhlsport	WINBET	—
Sоzopol	(Bulgaria) Margarit Dimov	(Bulgaria) Petar Kyumurdzhiev	Erreà	—	Efbet
Spartak	(Bulgaria) Vasil Petrov	(Bulgaria) Yancho Andreev	Jako	Efbet	—
Sportist	(Bulgaria) Borislav Kyosev	(Bulgaria) Borislav Stoychev	Zeus	Petar Electric	—
Strumska Slava	(Bulgaria) Yuriy Vasev	(Bulgaria) Borislav Nikolov	Givova	Efbet	—
Yantra	(Bulgaria) Sasho Angelov	(Bulgaria) Hristiyan Kozhuharov	Jumper	Efbet	—

Note: Individual clubs may wear jerseys with advertising. However, only one sponsorship is permitted per jersey for official tournaments organised by UEFA in addition to that of the kit manufacturer (exceptions are made for non-profit organisations). Clubs in the domestic league can have more than one sponsorship per jersey which can feature on the front of the shirt, incorporated with the main sponsor or in place of it; or on the back, either below the squad number or on the collar area. Shorts also have space available for advertisement.

=== Managerial changes ===
Team	Outgoing manager	Manner of departure	Date of vacancy	Position in table	Incoming manager	Date of appointment
CSKA 1948 II	N/A (inaugural season)			pre-season	(Bulgaria) Miroslav Mindev	29 May 2021
Levski Lom	(Bulgaria) Ferario Spasov	Sacked	31 May 2021	pre-season	(Bulgaria) Emil Velev	31 May 2021
Botev II	N/A (inaugural season)			pre-season	(Bulgaria) Stefan Stoyanov	7 June 2021
CSKA 1948 II	(Bulgaria) Miroslav Mindev	Promoted to CSKA 1948	27 July 2021	10th	(Bulgaria) Atanas Apostolov	27 July 2021
Levski Lom	(Bulgaria) Emil Velev	Resigned	11 August 2021	19th	(Bulgaria) Ivaylo Vasilev	12 August 2021
Yantra Gabrovo	(Bulgaria) Kostadin Angelov	Resigned	15 August 2021	19th	(Bulgaria) Sasho Angelov	1 September 2021
Dobrudzha	(Bulgaria) Stefan Slavov	Mutual consent	14 September 2021	16th	(Bulgaria) Atanas Atanasov	14 September 2021
CSKA 1948 II	(Bulgaria) Atanas Apostolov	Mutual consent	14 September 2021	15th	(Bulgaria) Andrey Andreev	28 September 2021
Neftochimic	(Bulgaria) Lyudmil Kirov	Resigned	22 October 2021	20th	(Bulgaria) Kaloyan Genov	24 October 2021
Neftochimic	(Bulgaria) Kaloyan Genov	Resigned	27 October 2021	20th	(Bulgaria) Vladimir Ivanov	30 October 2021
Levski Lom	(Bulgaria) Ivaylo Vasilev	Sacked	1 November 2021	19th	(Bulgaria) Anatoli Tonov	1 November 2021
CSKA 1948 II	(Bulgaria) Andrey Andreev	Mutual consent	3 December 2021	14th	(Bulgaria) Vladimir Dimitrov	19 December 2021
Strumska Slava	(Bulgaria) Vladimir Dimitrov	Mutual consent	17 December 2021	8th	(Bulgaria) Yuriy Vasev	17 December 2021
Montana	(Bulgaria) Svetlan Kondev	Mutual consent	21 December 2021	9th	(Bulgaria) Antoni Zdravkov	21 December 2021
Septemvri Sofia	(Bulgaria) Hristo Arangelov	Mutual consent	7 January 2022	6th	(Serbia) Slavko Matić	9 January 2022

== League table ==
Pos	Team	Pld	W	D	L	GF	GA	GD	Pts	Promotion, qualification or relegation
1	Septemvri Sofia (P)	36	21	7	8	77	35	+42	70	Promotion to the First League
2	Hebar Pazardzhik (P)	36	22	4	10	54	33	+21	70	Promotion to the First League
3	Spartak Varna (P)	36	21	7	8	64	39	+25	70	Promotion to the First League
4	Etar Veliko Tarnovo (A)	36	21	5	10	69	42	+27	68	Qualification for the promotion play-off
5	Minyor Pernik	36	18	9	9	50	35	+15	63	
6	Ludogorets Razgrad II	36	18	7	11	70	48	+22	61	Ineligible for promotion
7	Montana	36	15	13	8	39	31	+8	58	
8	Strumska Slava Radomir	36	15	9	12	40	37	+3	54	
9	Maritsa Plovdiv	36	14	8	14	51	48	+3	50	
10	Sportist Svoge	36	13	9	14	38	46	−8	48	
11	Dobrudzha Dobrich	36	11	12	13	39	45	−6	45	
12	CSKA 1948 II	36	12	9	15	53	50	+3	45	Ineligible for promotion
13	Litex Lovech	36	12	9	15	41	42	−1	45	
14	Yantra Gabrovo	36	10	10	16	30	46	−16	40	
15	Sozopol	36	9	12	15	40	56	−16	39	
16	Botev Plovdiv II	36	8	14	14	34	47	−13	38	Ineligible for promotion
17	Marek Dupnitsa (R)	36	8	12	16	29	46	−17	36	Relegation to the Third League
18	Septemvri Simitli (R)	36	8	9	19	41	68	−27	33	Relegation to the Third League
19	Levski Lom (R, D)	36	1	5	30	12	77	−65	8	Disqualified
20	Neftochimic Burgas (R, D)	0	0	0	0	0	0	0	0	Disqualified

Source: bulgarian-football.com
Rules for classification: 1) Points; 2) Head-to-head points; 3) Head-to-head goal difference; 4) Head-to-head goals scored; 5) Head-to-head away goals scored (only if two teams); 6) Goal difference; 7) Goals scored; 8) Fairplay ranking; 9) Draw.
(A) Advance to a further round; (D) Disqualified; (P) Promoted; (R) Relegated

== Results ==
Home \ Away	BOT	CSK	DOB	ETA	HEB	LEV	LIT	LUD	MAR	MRP	MIN	MON	NEF	SIM	SEP	SOZ	SPA	SPO	STR	YAN
Botev Plovdiv II	—	2–0	0–0	0–2	1–0	3–0	1–1	1–1	1–0	2–2	3–0	1–1	/	1–1	0–3	4–1	3–2	0–1	1–1	1–1
CSKA 1948 Sofia II	0–0	—	1–2	3–1	3–1	3–0	4–1	4–3	2–0	3–1	0–1	0–1	/	2–0	0–3	1–1	2–3	2–1	1–3	3–0
Dobrudzha	1–1	0–0	—	0–3	0–1	3–0	1–0	3–2	1–1	1–3	3–2	0–1	/	3–0	1–1	1–1	1–1	4–1	2–3	0–1
Etar	2–0	1–0	3–2	—	2–4	3–0	2–1	1–2	6–0	2–0	3–0	0–2	/	2–1	4–1	2–0	1–2	4–0	1–2	3–1
Hebar	3–0	4–1	2–0	1–1	—	1–0	1–0	2–1	3–0	2–0	1–1	0–3	/	2–0	1–0	2–1	2–1	3–1	1–1	2–0
Levski Lom	0–0	1–2	0–3	1–2	0–3	—	2–3	1–2	0–3	0–3	0–1	1–1	/	1–1	0–2	0–0	0–3	0–1	1–1	0–3
Litex	3–0	0–0	0–0	0–1	2–0	3–0	—	1–2	1–0	3–1	0–3	1–2	/	2–0	0–1	1–0	2–1	0–1	0–1	0–0
Ludogorets II	3–3	3–3	5–0	4–1	3–1	3–0	1–2	—	2–1	3–1	1–1	1–0	/	4–0	2–1	2–2	2–1	1–0	0–1	4–0
Marek	1–0	0–0	1–1	0–1	2–0	0–1	1–1	1–0	—	1–0	0–0	3–1	/	2–2	2–1	0–2	1–1	2–4	4–2	0–1
Maritsa	1–2	1–1	1–0	2–0	3–1	1–0	1–1	1–1	3–0	—	0–2	4–1	/	1–2	1–1	3–2	3–5	2–0	1–1	3–1
Minyor Pernik	1–0	1–0	1–1	2–2	1–3	3–0	4–0	3–1	1–1	1–0	—	1–1	/	4–2	0–3	3–0	1–0	1–0	3–0	2–0
Montana	1–0	1–1	0–0	0–2	0–1	2–1	1–1	1–0	1–0	0–1	2–1	—	/	1–1	0–0	3–2	1–1	1–0	0–0	2–0
Neftochimic	/	/	/	/	/	/	/	/	/	/	/	/	—	/	/	/	/	/	/	/
Septemvri Simitli	2–2	1–4	1–1	1–2	1–2	3–0	1–2	2–1	2–1	1–1	2–2	1–1	/	—	1–2	2–1	0–1	0–1	1–3	5–2
Septemvri Sofia	3–0	3–2	2–1	3–1	2–1	3–0	3–1	3–2	1–1	1–2	3–0	1–1	/	7–0	—	5–0	4–2	0–3	2–0	4–1
Sozopol	4–1	2–1	3–0	1–1	0–0	3–0	0–4	1–1	0–0	3–2	0–2	1–0	/	2–1	0–5	—	1–2	2–2	1–1	1–0
Spartak	3–0	2–0	1–2	3–1	1–0	2–1	2–1	0–1	0–0	3–0	2–0	2–1	/	3–1	2–1		—	1–1	2–1	1–1
Sportist Svoge	0–0	4–4	0–1	1–1	1–0	2–1	1–1	2–3	2–0	0–2	0–0	1–3	/	0–1	1–1	2–1	0–3	—	1–0	1–1
Strumska Slava	1–0	1–0	3–0	1–4	0–1	2–0	1–0	2–1	2–0	0–0	2–1	0–1	/	0–1	1–1	0–0	1–2	0–1	—	1–0
Yantra Gabrovo	1–0	1–0	0–1	1–1	0–2	3–0	2–2	1–2	0–0	1–0	0–1	1–1	/	2–0	1–0	0–0	1–1	0–1	2–1	—

Source: bulgarian-football.com
Legend: Blue = home team win; Yellow = draw; Red = away team win.
For upcoming matches, an "a" indicates there is an article about the rivalry between the two participants.
