= 2023–24 Second Professional Football League (Bulgaria) =

68th season of the Second Professional Football League (Bulgaria)

Second Professional Football League
- Season: 2023–24
- Dates: 14 July 2023 – June 2024
- Champions: Spartak Varna
- Promoted: Spartak Varna; Septemvri Sofia
- Relegated: Bdin Vidin; Chernomorets Balchik; Chernomorets Burgas; Maritsa Plovdiv
- Matches played: 306
- Goals scored: 663 (2.17 per match)
- Top goalscorer: Ahmed Ahmedov (21 goals)
- Best goalkeeper: Konstantin Kostadinov (20 clean sheets)
- Longest winning run: 6 games Spartak Varna
- Longest unbeaten run: 10 games Montana; Septemvri Sofia
- Longest winless run: 14 games Bdin Vidin
- Longest losing run: 6 games Bdin Vidin; Maritsa Plovdiv
- All statistics correct as of 11:01, 25 May 2024 (UTC).

The 2023–24 Second League is the 68th season of the Second League, the second tier of the Bulgarian football league system, and the 8th season under this name and current league structure.

== Teams ==
The following teams have changed divisions since the 2022–23 season.

=== To Second League ===
Promoted from Third League

- Chernomorets Balchik
- Bdin Vidin
- Chernomorets Burgas
- Marek Dupnitsa

Relegated from First League

- Spartak Varna
- Septemvri Sofia

=== From Second League ===
Relegated to Third League

- Botev Plovdiv II
- Vitosha Bistritsa
- Sozopol
- Minyor Pernik

Promoted to First League

- Etar Veliko Tarnovo
- Krumovgrad

== Stadium and locations ==
Location of teams in 2022–23 Second League

Team	City	Stadium	Capacity
Belasitsa	Petrich	Tsar Samuil	12,000
Bdin	Vidin	Georgi Benkovski	15,000
Chernomorets Balchik	Balchik	Balchik	2,600
Chernomorets Burgas	Burgas	Lazur	18,037
CSKA 1948 II	Sofia	Bistritsa	2,500
Dobrudzha	Dobrich	Druzhba	12,500
Dunav	Ruse	Gradski	13,000
Litex	Lovech	Gradski	8,100
Ludogorets II	Razgrad	Eagles' Nest	2,000
Marek	Dupnitsa	Bonchuk	16,000
Maritsa	Plovdiv	Maritsa	5,000
Montana	Montana	Ogosta	6,000
Septemvri	Sofia	Dragalevtsi	1,800
Spartak Pleven	Pleven	Pleven	22,000
Spartak Varna	Varna	Spartak	6,000
Sportist	Svoge	Chavdar Tsvetkov	3,500
Strumska Slava	Radomir	Gradski	3,500
Yantra	Gabrovo	Hristo Botev	14,000

== Personnel and sponsorship ==
Note: Flags indicate national team as has been defined under FIFA eligibility rules. Players and managers may hold more than one non-FIFA nationality.

== League table ==
Pos	Team	Pld	W	D	L	GF	GA	GD	Pts	Promotion, qualification or relegation
1	Spartak Varna (C, P)	34	23	3	8	60	28	+32	72	Promotion to the First League
2	Septemvri Sofia (P)	34	19	8	7	46	26	+20	65	Promotion to the First League
3	Marek Dupnitsa (Q)	34	16	13	5	36	26	+10	61	Qualification for the promotion play-off
4	Montana	34	16	9	9	46	31	+15	57	
5	Strumska Slava	34	14	9	11	34	28	+6	51	
6	Dobrudzha	34	14	8	12	43	34	+9	50 (Note: Dobrudzha finished ahead of CSKA 1948 Sofia II on head-to-head away goals scored: Dobrudzha 0–0 CSKA 1948 Sofia II, CSKA 1948 Sofia II 1–1 Dobrudzha)	
7	CSKA 1948 II	34	13	11	10	39	36	+3	50	Ineligible for promotion
8	Yantra	34	12	11	11	39	37	+2	47	
9	Dunav Ruse	34	12	10	12	30	36	−6	46	
10	Spartak Pleven	34	13	6	15	29	32	−3	45 (Note: Spartak Pleven finished ahead of Litex on head-to-head goals: Spartak Pleven 4, Litex 1)	
11	Litex Lovech	34	12	9	13	30	36	−6	45	
12	Ludogorets Razgrad II	34	11	11	12	39	39	0	44	Ineligible for promotion
13	Belasitsa Petrich	34	12	7	15	37	33	+4	43	
14	Sportist Svoge	34	10	10	14	36	45	−9	40	
15	Chernomorets Burgas (R)	34	9	11	14	33	41	−8	38	Relegation to the Third League
16	Chernomorets Balchik (R)	34	10	6	18	36	49	−13	36	Relegation to the Third League
17	Maritsa Plovdiv (R)	34	9	3	22	31	56	−25	30	Relegation to the Third League
18	Bdin Vidin (R)	34	5	7	22	19	50	−31	22	Relegation to the Third League

Source: bulgarian-football.com
Rules for classification: 1) Points; 2) Head-to-head points; 3) Head-to-head goal difference; 4) Head-to-head goals scored; 5) Head-to-head away goals scored (only if two teams); 6) Goal difference; 7) Goals scored; 8) Fairplay ranking; 9) Draw.
(C) Champions; (P) Promoted; (Q) Qualified for the phase indicated; (R) Relegated

== Results ==
Home \ Away	BEL	BDI	CBA	CBU	CSK	DOB	DUN	LIT	LUD	MAR	MRA	MON	SEP	SPA	SPV	SPO	STR	YAN
Belasitsa Petrich	—	4–0	3–0	1–1	0–2	1–1	0–1	0–1	2–0	0–0	2–0	1–0	1–2	0–2	2–0	3–1	2–0	0–0
Bdin Vidin	1–0	—	0–0	1–0	1–1	0–1	0–0	0–1	0–2	0–1	0–1	2–3	1–2	0–1	0–1	4–3	1–0	0–0
Chernomorets Balchik	1–3	6–0	—	0–0	1–3	1–3	2–0	3–0	0–2	0–2	1–0	1–1	0–2	0–1	4–1	2–0	0–0	2–1
Chernomorets Burgas	1–3	2–1	2–0	—	1–2	1–0	1–1	2–1	1–1	0–2	1–0	0–1	1–1	3–0	0–0	1–2	1–1	2–2
CSKA 1948 II	0–0	3–1	2–1	1–0	—	1–1	3–0	1–0	2–1	0–1	3–1	0–2	2–3	1–1	0–5	1–1	0–2	0–0
Dobrudzha	1–0	1–0	4–0	1–0	0–0	—	3–0	0–1	1–0	6–2	4–1	0–2	0–0	0–1	2–0	2–1	0–2	2–0
Dunav Ruse	1–1	1–1	2–0	2–0	0–2	2–0	—	2–0	2–2	0–0	2–1	1–1	1–1	0–1	0–1	1–1	1–0	0–3
Litex Lovech	2–1	0–1	1–1	2–0	3–0	1–1	1–0	—	0–0	2–1	2–2	0–1	1–0	0–0	1–2	0–0	0–0	0–0
Ludogorets Razgrad II	4–1	2–2	1–0	0–1	2–2	1–1	2–0	3–0	—	0–0	1–0	2–1	1–2	0–2	1–4	3–1	1–0	2–1
Marek Dupnitsa	1–0	1–0	1–0	3–1	0–0	2–1	1–1	1–1	1–0	—	1–0	0–0	1–1	4–1	2–1	2–0	0–0	1–1
Maritsa Plovdiv	2–0	3–2	0–2	3–3	1–0	1–0	0–1	1–0	1–1	0–1	—	1–2	0–2	2–1	0–2	3–1	4–1	1–2
Montana	1–3	2–0	1–0	2–2	0–0	2–2	0–1	2–1	3–2	2–1	5–0	—	0–2	1–0	1–1	2–0	0–1	2–0
Septemvri Sofia	2–0	1–0	3–0	0–1	2–1	2–0	1–2	2–0	0–0	0–0	3–1	0–0	—	2–1	0–2	2–1	0–2	1–2
Spartak Pleven	0–1	0–0	2–1	1–2	1–0	3–0	0–2	4–1	1–1	0–0	2–0	0–2	0–1	—	2–1	0–1	1–0	0–1
Spartak Varna	1–0	1–0	4–0	2–0	2–1	2–1	3–1	2–1	4–0	4–0	2–0	1–0	1–2	2–0	—	2–2	2–0	1–0
Sportist Svoge	1–1	2–0	1–2	1–0	2–4	2–2	0–1	0–1	1–0	3–1	1–0	1–1	0–2	1–0	2–0	—	1–0	0–0
Strumska Slava	1–0	2–0	2–2	2–1	0–0	2–0	2–0	2–3	1–0	0–0	1–0	3–2	0–0	2–0	1–2	1–1	—	1–0
Yantra	2–1	2–0	1–3	1–1	0–1	0–2	2–1	1–2	1–1	1–2	4–1	2–1	3–2	0–0	2–1	1–1	3–2	—

Source: bulgarian-football.com
Legend: Blue = home team win; Yellow = draw; Red = away team win.
For upcoming matches, an "a" indicates there is an article about the rivalry between the two participants.

=== Results by round ===
Team ╲ Round	1	2	3	4	5	6	7	8	9	10	11	12	13	14	15	16	17	18	19	20	21	22	23	24	25	26	27	28	29	30	31	32	33	34
Belasitsa	W	L	D	L	D	W	L	L	L	D	L	W	W	L	L	L	D	D	D	W	W	L	L	W	D	L	L	W	W	W	L	W	W	L
Bdin Vidin	D	L	L	W	L	L	D	L	L	W	L	D	W	L	D	D	L	L	W	L	L	L	L	D	L	L	L	L	L	L	D	L	L	W
Chernomorets Balchik	L	D	L	L	W	L	L	L	W	W	D	D	L	L	W	L	L	L	D	D	L	D	L	L	L	W	W	L	W	L	W	W	W	L
Chernomorets Burgas	L	W	D	D	D	D	W	W	L	L	D	W	W	W	L	L	D	L	L	L	L	W	L	D	L	D	D	W	L	D	W	L	L	D
CSKA 1948 II	L	W	W	L	D	L	D	W	L	W	L	D	D	W	W	D	D	L	L	W	L	D	D	L	W	W	D	D	L	W	D	W	W	W
Dobrudzha	W	D	W	L	D	D	W	L	W	D	W	L	W	L	W	L	D	W	L	D	L	D	W	W	W	W	W	L	W	L	D	L	L	L
Dunav Ruse	D	W	L	W	L	D	D	W	L	W	D	D	L	W	W	W	L	L	L	L	D	L	W	D	D	L	W	D	W	W	L	D	L	W
Litex	L	D	W	L	L	D	D	L	W	W	D	L	L	W	L	L	W	W	W	D	L	D	W	L	D	L	D	W	W	W	W	L	D	L
Ludogorets II	D	L	L	W	L	W	D	L	L	L	W	D	L	W	W	L	W	W	D	D	L	W	W	W	D	D	D	L	W	D	D	L	L	D
Marek Dupnitsa	W	D	W	W	D	D	L	W	W	W	D	D	D	W	L	D	D	W	L	W	W	W	L	W	D	W	D	D	W	D	L	W	W	D
Maritsa	W	L	W	L	D	W	W	L	L	L	L	W	L	L	L	W	L	L	W	L	L	L	W	L	L	L	L	L	L	W	L	L	D	D
Montana	L	D	W	W	W	W	D	D	W	W	W	L	D	W	L	D	D	L	W	D	W	L	W	W	W	L	D	W	L	L	W	D	L	W
Septemvri Sofia	W	W	W	W	W	L	L	W	W	W	W	D	D	W	D	D	W	L	D	W	W	W	L	D	W	W	L	W	L	D	D	L	W	W
Spartak Pleven	L	L	L	W	L	L	W	W	W	L	W	L	L	L	D	W	W	W	W	L	W	W	L	W	D	D	D	D	L	D	L	W	L	L
Spartak Varna	W	L	W	D	W	L	W	W	W	L	L	W	D	W	W	W	L	W	D	L	W	W	W	L	W	W	W	W	W	W	L	W	W	W
Sportist Svoge	L	W	L	L	L	D	D	D	L	L	L	W	D	L	D	W	W	D	D	W	D	L	L	W	L	L	D	W	W	L	W	D	W	L
Strumska Slava	W	D	L	L	W	W	D	L	W	L	W	L	W	L	D	W	D	W	D	D	W	L	D	L	W	D	W	L	L	L	W	W	W	D
Yantra Gabrovo	D	W	L	W	W	W	L	W	L	L	D	D	W	L	D	D	D	W	D	W	W	W	W	L	L	W	L	L	L	D	D	D	L	D

Source: Bulgarian Football
W = Win; D = Draw; L = Loss

=== Positions by round ===
Team ╲ Round	1	2	3	4	5	6	7	8	9	10	11	12	13	14	15	16	17	18	19	20	21	22	23	24	25	26	27	28	29	30	31	32	33	34
Belasitsa	2	7	11	14	12	9	12	13	14	15	16	15	12	13	15	15	16	16	16	16	13	14	15	14	13	14	14	14	13	13	13	13	13	13
Bdin Vidin	10	15	16	13	14	15	16	17	18	16	17	17	16	16	17	17	18	18	17	17	18	18	18	17	17	18	18	18	18	18	18	18	18	18
Chernomorets Balchik	18	17	17	18	13	17	18	18	16	14	15	14	15	17	16	16	17	17	18	18	17	17	17	18	18	17	17	17	16	17	16	16	16	16
Chernomorets Burgas	15	11	10	10	11	13	9	6	8	10	10	8	9	9	10	10	10	11	12	13	14	11	13	13	14	13	13	13	15	14	14	15	15	15
CSKA 1948 II	12	8	4	8	7	11	11	11	12	9	11	12	10	10	7	8	8	9	11	9	9	10	12	12	10	10	10	10	12	12	12	10	7	7
Dobrudzha	1	2	2	4	6	8	6	8	6	5	4	5	5	5	5	6	5	5	6	7	8	8	7	7	5	5	5	5	5	5	5	5	6	6
Dunav Ruse	9	3	12	5	10	10	10	9	10	7	8	9	8	7	6	5	6	7	8	12	10	13	11	10	11	11	11	11	10	9	10	12	12	9
Litex	15	16	7	11	16	14	15	16	13	13	12	13	14	11	14	14	14	12	10	11	12	12	10	11	12	12	12	12	11	10	7	9	10	11
Ludogorets II	8	13	15	12	15	12	13	14	15	17	14	16	17	15	11	13	12	13	13	10	11	9	9	8	9	9	9	9	9	8	9	11	11	12
Marek Dupnitsa	3	4	3	2	2	4	7	5	4	3	3	3	3	3	4	4	4	3	4	3	3	3	3	3	4	3	3	4	3	3	3	3	3	3
Maritsa	6	10	6	9	9	7	5	7	9	11	13	10	11	12	13	11	13	14	14	14	16	16	14	16	16	16	16	16	17	16	17	17	17	17
Montana	14	14	13	6	4	3	2	4	3	2	2	2	2	2	3	3	3	4	3	4	4	4	4	4	3	4	4	3	4	4	4	4	4	4
Septemvri Sofia	3	1	1	1	1	1	1	1	1	1	1	1	1	1	1	1	1	1	1	1	1	1	1	1	1	1	2	2	2	2	2	2	2	2
Spartak Pleven	12	18	18	16	17	18	14	12	11	12	9	11	13	14	12	12	11	8	7	8	7	6	6	6	7	7	8	8	7	7	11	8	9	10
Spartak Varna	6	12	5	7	3	6	4	2	2	4	5	4	4	4	2	2	2	2	2	2	2	2	2	2	2	2	1	1	1	1	1	1	1	1
Sportist Svoge	17	9	14	17	18	16	17	15	17	18	18	18	18	18	18	18	15	15	15	15	15	15	16	15	15	15	15	15	14	15	15	14	14	14
Strumska Slava	5	5	9	15	8	5	8	10	7	8	7	7	7	8	9	7	7	6	5	6	6	7	8	9	8	8	7	7	8	11	8	6	5	5
Yantra Gabrovo	10	6	8	3	5	2	3	3	5	6	6	6	6	6	8	9	9	10	9	5	5	5	5	5	6	6	6	6	6	6	6	7	8	8

Source: Bulgarian Football

== Season statistics ==
=== Top scorers ===
As of 24 May 2024

Rank	Player	Club	Goals
1	(Bulgaria) Ahmed Ahmedov	Spartak Varna	21
2	(Bulgaria) Preslav Yordanov	Dobrudzha	14
2	(Bulgaria) Daniel Mladenov	Yantra	14
4	(Bulgaria) Veselin Marchev	Maritsa	11
5	(Bulgaria) Zapro Dinev	Belasitsa	9
5	(Bulgaria) Vasil Shopov	Spartak Pleven	9
5	(Bulgaria) Zhivko Petkov	Chernomorets Burgas	9
5	(Bulgaria) Stanislav Malamov	Maritsa	9
5	(Bulgaria) Iliyan Kapitanov	Litex	9
5	(Bulgaria) Borislav Marinov	Septemvri Sofia	9
11	(Bulgaria) Rumen Rumenov	Spartak Varna	8
11	(Bulgaria) Borislav Nikolov	Strumska Slava	8
11	(Bulgaria) Yoan Yordanov	Ludogorets II	8
11	(Bulgaria) Miroslav Budinov	Dunav	8
11	(Bulgaria) Vasil Bozhinov	Spartak Pleven	8

=== Most assists ===
As of 24 May 2024

Rank	Player	Club	Assists
1	(Bulgaria) Dimitar Burov	Montana	10
1	(Bulgaria) Steven Kirilov	Strumska Slava/Montana	10
3	(Bulgaria) Aykut Ramadan	Septemvri Sofia	9
4	(Bulgaria) Ahmed Ahmedov	Spartak Varna	7
4	(Bulgaria) Preslav Yordanov	Dobrudzha	7
4	(Bulgaria) Veselin Lyubomirov	Marek	7
4	(Brazil) Cassiano Bouzon	Chernomorets Balchik	7
4	(Panama) Romeesh Ivey	Spartak Varna	7
9	(Bulgaria) Veselin Marchev	Maritsa	6
9	(Bulgaria) Viktor Mitev	Spartak Varna	6
9	(Bulgaria) Rumen Rumenov	Spartak Varna	6

=== Clean sheets ===
As of 24 May 2024

Rank	Goalkeeper	Club	Clean sheets
1	(Bulgaria) Konstantin Kostadinov	Marek	20
2	(Bulgaria) Dragomir Petkov	Strumska Slava	18
3	(Bulgaria) Dimitar Sheytanov	Septemvri Sofia	15
4	(Bulgaria) Vasil Simeonov	Montana	14
4	(Bulgaria) Stanislav Antonov	Spartak Pleven	14
6	(Bulgaria) Aleks Bozhev	Litex	13
7	(Bulgaria) Georgi Argilashki	Dobrudzha	12
8	(Bulgaria) Georgi Georgiev	Spartak Varna	11
