= FC Sportist Svoge =

Bulgarian football club

Sportist
- Full name: FC Sportist Svoge
- Nickname: The chocolates
- Founded: 1924; 102 years ago
- Ground: Chavdar Tsvetkov, Svoge
- Capacity: 3,500
- Chairman: Petar Veselinov
- Head coach: Zahari Sirakov
- League: Second League
- 2025–26: Second League, 13th of 17
- Website: sportist-svoge.net
Home colours	Away colours

FC Sportist (Bulgarian: ФК Спортист) is a Bulgarian football club based in Svoge, which currently competes in the Second League, the second tier of Bulgarian football, following promotion from the Third League.

The club was founded in 1924 and their home ground is the Stadion Chavdar Tsvetkov, which has a seating capacity of 3,500 spectators. The club's biggest success is promotion to the Bulgarian top division in 2009, although they were relegated at the end of the 2009-10 season. The club plays home games in blue and white kits.

== History ==
=== Early years ===
Sportist Svoge was formed in 1924, as a sports club characterized by a blue and white check jersey. In 1949, after reorganization, the club was renamed to DSNM Svoge. In the years between 1952 and 1954, the sports club competes with the name of Minyor Svoge, and in the period between 1954 and 1957 carries the simple name FC Svoge. The club finally became known as Sportist Svoge in 1957, the name, which is known to date.

=== Road to the Elite ===
Until 2007, Sportist participated in either the third or the fourth amateurs divisions, but in 2006-07 the team were promoted for the first time to second division. In their first season in professional football, the club finished in 6th place. In 2008 manager Aleksandar Aleksandrov laid the foundations of a good team. The 2008–09 season in the domestic league was successful for the team, which finished 2nd, and managed to participate in the play-off for promotion in the Bulgarian A PFG. On June 17, 2009, Sportist surprisingly won the play-off against Naftex Burgas with a result of 6:4 in the penalty shoot-out and qualified for the A PFG for the first time in the club's history.

=== A Group Season ===
On August 10, 2009, in the first match of the club in the top division of Bulgarian football, Sportist finished with a 1:1 draw against Slavia Sofia. The first goal for the club in the A PFG scored Georgi Semerdzhiev. The first win came in the 5th round against Lokomotiv Plovdiv, by a score of 2:1 at the Stadion Chavdar Cvetkov. Sportist won just five games in their first A PFG campaign. From the five wins, four came from home games. The team managed to beat Botev Plovdiv, Cherno More Varna, Lokomotiv Plovdiv, and Sliven. Away results were even less impressive. Sportist only managed to beat Minyor Pernik and draw with Botev Plovdiv. These results earned the team 19 points, which was 13 points below the safety line. Sportist was thus relegated at the end of the season to the 2010–11 B Group.

=== Return to lower leagues ===
The following two seasons were successful for the club, as they managed to earn second place twice in a row, qualifying for the promotion playoffs, but Sportist were unlucky on both occasions, losing to Chernomorets Pomorie and Botev Plovdiv respectively. For the 2012–13 B Group season, Sportist Svoge did not obtain a license due to financial reasons and was excluded from the second league. The team was relegated to the fourth tier of Bulgarian football, but managed to promote to the third tier the following season, 2013–14. After 2 seasons in the third division, Sportist was again relegated to the fourth tier. The team remained there until 2018 when they won promotion to the third league once more for the 2018–19 season. Svoge finished in 15th place following its return to the third division.

For the 2019–20 season, Sportist finished in third place in the third tier, but earned promotion to the second level, following the disqualification of Pomorie from the second tier.

In 2023, Sportist finished in fifth place in the Second League and qualified for the promotion playoffs for entering First League. Sportist played against Beroe Stara Zagora in Veliko Tarnovo but lost the game 1–0, thus remaining in the Second League.

== Honours ==
Bulgarian A PFG:

- 15th place in the "A" group: 2009/10

Bulgarian Cup:

- 1/8 finalist 1950 and 2007/08

== Current squad ==
As of 30 August 2026

Note: Flags indicate national team as defined under FIFA eligibility rules; some limited exceptions apply. Players may hold more than one non-FIFA nationality.

No.	Pos.	Nation	Player
1	GK	BUL	Nikola Zlatinov
5	DF	BUL	Miroslav Boyanov
6	DF	BUL	Mihail Zahariev (on loan from Lokomotiv Sofia)
7	MF	BUL	Antonio Popov (on loan from Slavia Sofia II)
8	DF	BUL	Kristiyan Ivanov
9	FW	BUL	Kaloyan Shkretov
10	FW	BUL	Viktor Dobrev
11	FW	BUL	Dimitar Ivanov
12	GK	BUL	Deyan Georgiev
14	MF	FRA	Junior Nzila
18	MF	BUL	Kaloyan Atanasov

No.	Pos.	Nation	Player
19	DF	BUL	Hristo Petrov
20	MF	BUL	Pavel Ivanov
21	MF	ITA	Fahuz Mikaila
22	DF	BUL	Adriyan Todorov
27	FW	BUL	Yoan Velinov
33	GK	CGO	Yann Batola
45	MF	BUL	Daniel Nachev
73	FW	POR	Kevin Nhaga
87	DF	BUL	Petyo Mitrov
88	DF	BUL	Valentin Karchev
99	FW	FRA	Abdul Fofana

For recent transfers, see Transfers winter 2025–26 and Transfers summer 2026.

== Notable players ==
Had international caps for their respective countries, held any club record, or had more than 100 league appearances. Players whose name is listed in bold represented their countries.

Bulgaria

- (Bulgaria) **Danail Bachkov**
- (Bulgaria) Deyan Borisov
- (Bulgaria) **Ivaylo Dimitrov**
- (Bulgaria) **Radoslav Dimitrov**
- (Bulgaria) **Diyan Donchev**
- (Bulgaria) **Ventsislav Hristov**
- (Bulgaria) Lachezar Mladenov
- (Bulgaria) **Georgi Nikolov**
- (Bulgaria) **Georgi Pashov**
- (Bulgaria) Borislav Stoychev
- (Bulgaria) **Chavdar Tsvetkov**
- (Bulgaria) Georgi Yanev

North America

- (Curaçao) **Nathan Holder**

Africa

- (Cape Verde) **Dylan Silva**
- (Cape Verde) **Paulo Soares**

== Managerial history ==
This is a list of the last six Sportist Svoge managers:

Name	Nat	From	To	Honours
Ivan Atanasov	(Bulgaria)	June 2007	5 January 2008	–
Atanas Dzhambazki	(Bulgaria)	5 January 2008	4 November 2008	–
Aleksandar Aleksandrov	(Bulgaria)	5 November 2008	31 August 2009	–
Ivan Atanasov	(Bulgaria)	31 August 2009	24 December 2009	–
Stoycho Stoev	(Bulgaria)	24 December 2009	19 April 2010	–
Ivan Atanasov	(Bulgaria)	19 April 2010	present	–

As of 19 April 2010

== Stadium ==
The club's home ground is the Chavdar Tsvetkov Stadium. It was opened in 1967.

Until 2007, the stadium was called Iskar. The same year, the stadium underwent serious renovation and its capacity was increased to 1,600 spectators and was renamed after the legendary striker of the club - Chavdar Tsvetkov. The stadium also has a parking lot with 120 parking spaces, including 10 for disabled people.

In 2009, the stadium's capacity was expanded to 3,500 spectators. The record attendance at the stadium is 3,250 spectators and was achieved at the game between Sportist and Levski Sofia on October 25, 2009.
