= List of Bulgarian football transfers summer 2024 =

This is a list of Bulgarian football transfers for the 2024 summer transfer window. Only transfers involving a team from the two professional leagues, First League and Second League are listed.

== First League ==
=== Arda ===
In:

No.	Pos.	Nation	Player
8	MF	TUR	Baran Aksaka (on loan from (Turkey) Galatasaray)
9	FW	NGR	Chinonso Offor (from (Canada) CF Montréal, previously on loan)
17	DF	BUL	Ilker Budinov (on loan from Ludogorets II)
23	DF	BUL	Emil Viyachki (free transfer from CSKA 1948)
30	FW	BUL	Ivo Kazakov (from Botev Plovdiv II)
35	DF	BUL	Dimitar Velkovski (from (Cyprus) Doxa Katokopias)

Out:

No.	Pos.	Nation	Player
3	DF	CIV	Oumar Sako (to (Russia) Rostov, previously on loan)
8	MF	BUL	Stanislav Dyulgerov (end of contract)
12	DF	NGR	Okezie Ebenezer (end of contract)
15	FW	MTN	El Mami Tetah (loan return to (Turkey) Alanyaspor)
17	FW	BUL	Ivan Kokonov (end of contract)
20	DF	BUL	Deyan Lozev (end of contract)
32	DF	BUL	Hristo Mitev (end of contract)
77	MF	BUL	Iliya Yurukov (end of contract)
80	MF	BUL	Lachezar Kotev (loan return to (Russia) Khimki)

=== Beroe ===
In:

No.	Pos.	Nation	Player
2	DF	ESP	Oier Sarriegi (from (Spain) Utebo)
6	DF	ESP	Felipe Chacartegui (from (Spain) Badajoz)
9	FW	ARG	Santiago Godoy (loan return from (Argentina) Defensa y Justicia)
11	MF	ESP	Ismael Ferrer (from (Spain) Real Murcia)
12	MF	BRA	Vinicius Belotti (from Bdin Vidin)
17	FW	DOM	Juanca Pineda (from (Spain) Guadalajara)
20	MF	URU	Manuel Monzeglio (on loan from (Uruguay) Nacional)
21	FW	ESP	Alberto Salido (from (Spain) La Unión Atlético)
23	MF	ARG	Kevin Ceijas (from (Spain) Marbella)
32	MF	ARG	Thiago Ceijas (from (Poland) ŁKS Łódź)
96	GK	POR	Rúben Rendeiro (from (Portugal) Amora)

Out:

No.	Pos.	Nation	Player
6	DF	ECU	Jordi Govea (to (Slovenia) Olimpija Ljubljana)
7	FW	ARG	Federico Zanetti (released)
8	MF	ESP	Javier Esteban-Silgo (released)
11	MF	BRA	Werick Caetano (on loan to (Vietnam) Da Nang)
12	DF	FRA	Temitope Akinjogunla (released)
21	MF	BUL	Damyan Yordanov (to Botev Plovdiv)
22	FW	COL	Sebastián Villa (to (Argentina) Independiente Rivadavia)
23	GK	ARG	Rodrìgo Accinelli (to (Romania) Bihor Oradea)
25	DF	FRA	Moussa Diallo (loan return to (Switzerland) Servette)
91	FW	CMR	Vinni Triboulet (to Botev Plovdiv)
98	MF	GBS	Ronaldo Camará (released)
99	FW	ECU	Mike Cevallos (to (Spain) Antoniano, previously on loan to (Spain) El Palo)

=== Botev Plovdiv ===
In:

No.	Pos.	Nation	Player
1	GK	DEN	Hans Christian Bernat (from (Denmark) OB)
6	DF	BUL	Andrey Yordanov (from Pirin Blagoevgrad)
11	FW	NGR	Anthony Ujah (from (Germany) Eintracht Braunschweig)
21	MF	BUL	Nikola Iliev (from (Italy) Inter Milan)
88	MF	SLO	Alen Korošec (from (Slovenia) Rogaška)
91	FW	CMR	Vinni Triboulet (from Beroe)
99	FW	MNE	Aleksa Maraš (from (Montenegro) Mladost Donja Gorica)
—	MF	BUL	Damyan Yordanov (from Beroe)
—	MF	ARM	Edgar Piloyan (from (Armenia) Van)

Out:

No.	Pos.	Nation	Player
1	GK	BIH	Hidajet Hankić (to (Russia) Rostov)
6	MF	NED	Dylan Mertens (to (Russia) Fakel Voronezh)
7	FW	FRA	Mohamed Brahimi (end of contract)
9	FW	CRO	Martin Sekulić (to (Russia) Ural)
14	FW	LTU	Faustas Steponavičius (on loan to Septemvri Sofia)
15	MF	CMR	James Eto'o (to CSKA Sofia)
18	DF	BUL	Dimitar Papazov (to (Italy) Bologna U19)
25	DF	BUL	Stanislav Rabotov (to Krumovgrad)
31	FW	NGR	Umeh Emmanuel (to (Switzerland) Zürich)

=== Botev Vratsa ===
In:

No.	Pos.	Nation	Player
6	DF	ESP	David Suárez (from (Spain) Melilla)
7	FW	BUL	Ivan Vasilev (from Etar Veliko Tarnovo)
8	FW	UKR	Danylo Kondrakov (from (Malta) Sliema Wanderers)
22	MF	BUL	Antoan Stoyanov (on loan from Levski Sofia)
25	DF	BUL	Deyan Lozev (from Arda Kardzhali)
32	DF	BUL	Martin Dichev (from Cherno More)
33	DF	BUL	Stefan Tsonkov (from CSKA 1948 II)
70	DF	BUL	Dilyan Georgiev (from Sportist Svoge)
97	FW	BUL	Vladislav Naydenov (from Ludogorets Razgrad II)

Out:

No.	Pos.	Nation	Player
7	DF	BUL	Ilker Budinov (loan return to Ludogorets II)
8	MF	FRA	Kléri Serber (loan return to (France) Toulouse)
11	FW	MLI	Lassana N'Diaye (released)
18	MF	POR	Diogo Barbosa (end of contract)
23	DF	ITA	Bryan Mendoza (end of contract)
28	DF	BRA	Eduardo Kunde (released)
30	DF	BUL	Petko Ganev (to Dobrudzha)
37	MF	FRA	Mario-Jason Kikonda (released)
76	GK	BUL	Krasimir Kostov (released)

=== Cherno More ===
In:

No.	Pos.	Nation	Player
5	MF	ARG	Nacho Pais (from (Spain) Antequera)
8	DF	BUL	Asen Donchev (from CSKA Sofia)
11	MF	BRA	Dudu (from (Brazil) Aparecidense)
13	FW	ROU	Claudiu Keșerü (free agent)
33	GK	BUL	Plamen Iliev (from (Romania) Universitatea Cluj)
88	MF	BRA	Renan Areias (on loan from Krumovgrad)
91	MF	BUL	Velislav Vasilev (loan return from Yantra)
—	GK	BUL	Galin Grigorov (loan return from Chernomorets Balchik)
—	DF	BUL	Petar Ivanov (loan return from Chernomorets Balchik)
—	DF	BUL	Nasko Yankov (loan return from Chernomorets Balchik)

Out:

No.	Pos.	Nation	Player
5	MF	ESP	Pablo Álvarez (to (Ukraine) Karpaty Lviv)
9	FW	BUL	Atanas Iliev (to (Cyprus) Anorthosis)
11	FW	BUL	Ilian Iliev Jr. (loan return to (Cyprus) Apollon Limassol)
25	GK	BUL	Ivan Dyulgerov (to CSKA Sofia)
32	DF	BUL	Martin Dichev (to Botev Vratsa)
33	FW	BRA	Michael (to Dobrudzha)
39	FW	BUL	Nikolay Zlatev (on loan to (Slovenia) Tabor Sežana)
—	GK	BUL	Galin Grigorov (to Dobrudzha)
—	DF	BUL	Petar Ivanov (to Etar)
—	DF	BUL	Nasko Yankov (to Lovech)

=== CSKA Sofia ===
In:

No.	Pos.	Nation	Player
5	DF	KOS	Lumbardh Dellova (from (Kosovo) Ballkani)
6	DF	SCO	Liam Cooper (free transfer from (England) Leeds United)
9	MF	KOS	Zymer Bytyqi (free transfer from (Turkey) Antalyaspor)
18	DF	LUX	Mica Pinto (free transfer from (Netherlands) Vitesse)
22	FW	COD	Jason Lokilo (from (England) Hull City)
25	GK	BUL	Ivan Dyulgerov (from Cherno More)
28	FW	BUL	Mark-Emilio Papazov (loan return from Hebar)
29	FW	BUL	Ivan Tasev (from Pirin Blagoevgrad)
45	FW	BEL	Aaron Leya Iseka (from (Greece) OFI)
73	MF	BUL	Ilian Iliev Jr. (free transfer from (Cyprus) Apollon Limassol)
77	FW	CAF	Goduine Koyalipou (from (Belgium) Beveren)
91	FW	BUL	Yoan Bornosuzov (from (Italy) Genoa)
99	MF	CMR	James Eto'o (from Botev Plovdiv)
—	DF	BUL	Rosen Marinov (loan return from Lovech)
—	DF	BUL	Aleksandar Buchkov (loan return from Lovech)
—	FW	BUL	Pavel Zhabov (loan return from Chernomorets Burgas)

Out:

No.	Pos.	Nation	Player
2	DF	NED	Jurgen Mattheij (end of contract)
4	DF	NED	Menno Koch (free transfer to (Norway) Sarpsborg 08)
9	FW	BRA	Fernando Karanga (free transfer to (China) Dalian Yingbo)
18	MF	BUL	Simeon Aleksandrov (free transfer to CSKA 1948 II, previously on loan to Septemvri Sofia)
22	DF	LUX	Enes Mahmutović (free transfer to (Netherlands) NAC Breda)
25	GK	BUL	Dimitar Evtimov (on loan to (Cyprus) Karmiotissa)
27	MF	SRB	Lazar Tufegdžić (free transfer to (Serbia) Čukarički)
30	FW	COL	Danilo Asprilla (end of contract)
—	GK	BUL	Aleks Bozhev (to CSKA 1948, previously on loan to Lovech)
—	DF	BUL	Asen Donchev (to Cherno More, previously on loan to Pirin Blagoevgrad)
—	FW	GHA	Bismark Charles (to (Albania) Skënderbeu, previously on loan to (Bosnia and Herzegovina) Željezničar)

=== CSKA 1948 ===
In:

No.	Pos.	Nation	Player
11	FW	BRA	Cassiano Bouzon (from Chernomorets Balchik)
33	GK	BUL	Aleks Bozhev (from CSKA Sofia, previously on loan to Lovech)
40	FW	MKD	Mario Ilievski (from (Hungary) Kisvárda)
47	MF	FRA	Paolo Sciortino (from (France) Marseille B)
65	DF	CRO	Karlo Tomašec (from (Romania) Universitatea Craiova)
70	MF	BUL	Simeon Aleksandrov (from CSKA Sofia)
—	DF	ALG	Riad Belhadj (from (Algeria) USM Alger)
—	FW	NIG	Kairou Amoustapha (from (Mexico) Cancún)
—	FW	BRA	Dudu Hatamoto (from (Portugal) Feirense)

Out:

No.	Pos.	Nation	Player
2	DF	BRA	Johnathan (released)
3	DF	BUL	Rosen Bozhinov (to (Belgium) Antwerp)
20	MF	BUL	Antonio Vutov (to Spartak Varna)
23	DF	BUL	Emil Viyachki (to Arda)
24	DF	ALB	Erdenis Gurishta (to (Albania) Vllaznia)
29	GK	BUL	Daniel Naumov (to (Greece) OFI)
33	GK	UKR	Hennadiy Hanyev (released)
87	DF	BUL	Simeon Petrov (to (Poland) Śląsk Wrocław, previously on loan)

=== Hebar ===
In:

No.	Pos.	Nation	Player
8	FW	BUL	Kristiyan Andonov (from Botev Ihtiman)
11	MF	MNE	Dušan Vuković (from (Montenegro) Mladost Donja Gorica)
14	MF	BUL	Yanko Angelov (from Maritsa Plovdiv)
15	MF	BEL	William Fonkeu (from Chernomorets Balchik)
18	DF	BUL	Radoslav Terziev (from Spartak Varna)
19	MF	BUL	Georgi Staykov (from Lovech)
20	MF	BUL	Milen Gamakov (from Dobrudzha)
23	DF	BUL	Kaloyan Pehlivanov (from Krumovgrad)
24	DF	FRA	Enzo El Fattahi (from (France) Nancy B)
70	FW	TUN	Nabil Makni (from (Italy) Sangiuliano)
84	FW	BUL	Kaloyan Krastev (from Lokomotiv Sofia)
97	GK	CPV	Márcio Rosa (from (Portugal) Anadia)
98	FW	BUL	Georgi Tartov (from Slavia Sofia)
—	DF	FRA	Hugo Ozée (from Krumovgrad)
—	MF	BUL	Martin Raynov (from Lokomotiv Plovdiv)

Out:

No.	Pos.	Nation	Player
3	MF	BUL	Bogomil Bozhurkin (to Pirin Blagoevgrad)
7	MF	BUL	Georgi Valchev (to Pirin Blagoevgrad)
9	FW	BUL	Nicholas Penev (to Lokomotiv Plovdiv)
10	MF	BUL	Angel Bastunov (to (Portugal) Vizela)
13	DF	BUL	Arhan Isuf (to (Albania) Tirana)
17	FW	BUL	Mark-Emilio Papazov (loan return to CSKA Sofia)
24	DF	BUL	Lazar Marin (to Krumovgrad)
32	GK	BUL	Boyan Zagorski (to CSKA Sofia II)
33	DF	BUL	Stefan Tsonkov (loan return to CSKA 1948 II)
75	MF	MAD	Johan N'Zi (to Lokomotiv Plovdiv)
99	MF	BUL	Georgi Karakashev (loan return to Lokomotiv Plovdiv)
—	MF	BUL	Martin Raynov (released)

=== Krumovgrad ===
In:

No.	Pos.	Nation	Player
9	FW	BRA	Rafael Furtado (from (Brazil) Confiança)
14	MF	BUL	Stefan Popov (from Maritsa Plovdiv)
18	MF	BRA	Daniel de Pauli (from (Brazil) Goiânia)
19	FW	BUL	Nasko Milev (from (Kosovo) Gjilani)
22	MF	BUL	Erol Dost (free transfer from Slavia Sofia)
24	DF	BUL	Lazar Marin (free transfer from Hebar)
25	DF	BUL	Stanislav Rabotov (from Botev Plovdiv)
—	DF	TUR	Sertan Vatansever (from (Turkey) Eynesil Belediyespor)

Out:

No.	Pos.	Nation	Player
3	DF	BUL	Kaloyan Pehlivanov (released)
8	MF	BRA	Renan Areias (on loan to Cherno More)
9	FW	BUL	Aleksandar Kolev (to Levski Sofia)
18	DF	BRA	Klaidher Macedo (released)
30	MF	BUL	Zhak Pehlivanov (released)
31	DF	FRA	Hugo Ozée (to Hebar)
80	FW	BUL	Kitan Vasilev (to Dobrudzha)

=== Levski Sofia ===
In:

No.	Pos.	Nation	Player
3	DF	BRA	Maicon (from (Brazil) Nova Iguaçu)
4	DF	VEN	Christian Makoun (free transfer from (Cyprus) Anorthosis Famagusta)
9	FW	BUL	Aleksandar Kolev (from Krumovgrad)
12	FW	FRA	Mustapha Sangaré (from (Portugal) Varzim)
21	DF	POR	Aldair Neves (from (Spain) Ponferradina)
30	MF	NGR	Clement Ikenna (from (Croatia) Dubrava)
44	GK	CRO	Matej Marković (free transfer from (Croatia) Rudeš)
—	MF	BUL	Antoan Stoyanov (loan return from (Italy) Empoli Primavera)
—	MF	CUW	Nathan Holder (loan return from Sportist Svoge)
—	FW	BUL	Zdravko Dimitrov (loan return from (Turkey) Sakaryaspor)

Out:

No.	Pos.	Nation	Player
1	GK	BUL	Plamen Andreev (to (Netherlands) Feyenoord)
9	FW	BRA	Ricardinho (to (Czech Republic) Viktoria Plzeň)
13	GK	BUL	Nikolay Mihaylov (retired)
19	FW	MAR	Bilal Bari (end of contract)
20	MF	BUL	Asen Chandarov (on loan to Septemvri Sofia)
24	DF	URU	Joaquín Fernández (free transfer to (Mexico) Dorados)
27	MF	BUL	Borislav Rupanov (on loan to Septemvri Sofia)
33	DF	PAN	José Córdoba (to (England) Norwich City)
80	MF	BUL	Andrian Kraev (free transfer to (Portugal) Casa Pia)
—	MF	BUL	Antoan Stoyanov (on loan to Botev Vratsa)
—	MF	CUW	Nathan Holder (released)
—	FW	BUL	Zdravko Dimitrov (to (Turkey) Bodrum)

=== Lokomotiv Plovdiv ===
In:

No.	Pos.	Nation	Player
7	FW	UKR	Danylo Polonskyi (from Pirin Blagoevgrad)
17	FW	BUL	Nicholas Penev (from Hebar)
33	MF	BUL	Georgi Karakashev (loan return from Hebar)
75	MF	MAD	Johan N'Zi (from Hebar)
99	FW	FRA	Julien Lamy (from (Slovenia) Mura)
—	FW	BRA	Marcilio Silva (from (Brazil) Mamoré)
—	FW	COL	Juan Perea (from (Portugal) Académica de Coimbra)

Out:

No.	Pos.	Nation	Player
7	FW	SEN	Babacar Dione (end of contract)
9	FW	BEL	Mitchy Ntelo (to (Switzerland) Yverdon-Sport)
10	MF	FRA	Yohan Baï (end of contract)
17	MF	BUL	Martin Raynov (to Hebar)
21	FW	BRA	Ewandro (to (Cyprus) Omonia Nicosia)
23	GK	CRO	Dinko Horkaš (to (Spain) Las Palmas)

=== Lokomotiv Sofia ===
In:

No.	Pos.	Nation	Player
3	MF	ALB	Donaldo Açka (from (Kosovo) Gjilani)
5	DF	GRE	Athanasios Pitsolis (from Spartak Pleven)
7	FW	BUL	Aleksandar Petrov (from Yantra)
8	MF	BUL	Simeon Slavchev (from (Poland) Wieczysta Kraków)
9	FW	BUL	Svetoslav Dikov (from Sportist Svoge)
26	DF	FRA	Mamadou Diarra (from (France) Paris 13 Atletico)
29	FW	CRO	Ante Aralica (from (Poland) Wieczysta Kraków)
94	FW	BUL	Yuliyan Nenov (from (Malta) Ħamrun Spartans)
—	FW	MAR	Anisse Brrou (from (Belgium) SL16 FC)

Out:

No.	Pos.	Nation	Player
1	GK	GAM	Baboucarr Gaye (end of contract)
2	DF	POR	Gonçalo Cardoso (to (Portugal) Paços de Ferreira)
5	DF	CMR	Daniel Kamy (released)
7	FW	FRA	Kévin Mayi (released)
9	FW	BUL	Kaloyan Krastev (released)
11	FW	BRA	França (end of contract)
16	MF	BUL	Simeon Mechev (end of contract)
17	MF	BUL	Teodor Ivanov (on loan to Marek)
21	MF	BUL	Antoni Ivanov (to (Romania) Hermannstadt)
26	MF	BUL	Krasimir Miloshev (end of contract)
45	FW	BUL	Dimitar Mitkov (end of contract)

=== Ludogorets ===
In:

No.	Pos.	Nation	Player
15	DF	SWE	Edvin Kurtulus (from (Sweden) Hammarby)
19	FW	BUL	Georgi Rusev (on loan from (Switzerland) Sion)
20	MF	GUI	Aguibou Camara (from (Greece) Olympiacos)
23	MF	CPV	Deroy Duarte (free transfer from (Netherlands) Fortuna Sittard)
39	GK	GER	Hendrik Bonmann (free transfer from (Austria) Wolfsberger AC)
75	MF	RUS	Elisey Syrov (from Ludogorets U17)
77	FW	BRA	Erick Marcus (on loan from (Brazil) Vasco da Gama)
—	DF	ARG	Franco Russo (loan return from (Belgium) OH Leuven)
—	DF	ESP	Pipa (loan return from (England) West Bromwich Albion)
—	FW	FRA	Mounir Chouiar (loan return from (France) Amiens)

Out:

No.	Pos.	Nation	Player
8	MF	POR	Claude Gonçalves (free transfer to (Poland) Legia Warsaw)
12	GK	CRO	Simon Sluga (free transfer to (Israel) Maccabi Tel Aviv)
26	DF	GAM	Noah Sonko Sundberg (on loan to (Turkey) Sivasspor)
44	DF	GER	Marcel Heister (free transfer to (Croatia) Istra 1961)
—	DF	ARG	Franco Russo (on loan to (Mexico) Querétaro)
—	DF	ESP	Pipa (on loan to (Spain) Burgos)
—	FW	FRA	Mounir Chouiar (on loan to (Switzerland) Zürich)

=== Septemvri Sofia ===
In:

No.	Pos.	Nation	Player
12	GK	BUL	Vladimir Ivanov (from Kyustendil)
20	FW	LTU	Faustas Steponavičius (on loan from Botev Plovdiv)
22	FW	BRA	Vitinho (from (Brazil) América-SP)
23	FW	MKD	Nikola Velichkovski (from (North Macedonia) Makedonija G.P.)
26	DF	BUL	Martin Hristov (on loan from Botev Plovdiv)
27	DF	BUL	Georgi Varbanov (from Pirin Blagoevgrad)

Out:

No.	Pos.	Nation	Player
4	DF	BUL	Ivan Arsov (released)
5	DF	BUL	Asen Georgiev (to Etar)
7	FW	MKD	Martin Stojanov (released)
9	FW	BUL	Martin Toshev (released)
10	MF	BUL	Aykut Ramadan (released)
12	GK	BUL	Aleksandar Andreev (to (Spain) Girona U19)
13	MF	BUL	Yordan Yordanov (to Minyor Pernik)
14	MF	BUL	Preslav Georgiev (to Spartak Pleven)
15	DF	BUL	Georgi Dinkov (released)
16	MF	CRO	Josip Mihalić (released)
17	FW	BUL	Simeon Aleksandrov (loan return to CSKA Sofia)
23	MF	BUL	Yoan Gavrilov (released)

=== Slavia Sofia ===
In:

No.	Pos.	Nation	Player
11	FW	MTQ	Karl Fabien (from (France) Angoulême)
23	FW	BUL	Tsvetelin Chunchukov (from (Romania) Steaua București)

Out:

No.	Pos.	Nation	Player
9	FW	BUL	Martin Sorakov (on loan to Montana)
11	FW	BUL	Kristian Dobrev (released)
17	MF	BUL	Erol Dost (to Krumovgrad)
55	DF	BUL	Ivaylo Markov (released)
88	FW	BUL	Toni Tasev (to (Turkey) Erzurumspor)
93	MF	CAF	Isaac Solet (to (Turkey) Göztepe)
98	FW	BUL	Georgi Tartov (to Hebar)

=== Spartak Varna ===
In:

No.	Pos.	Nation	Player
3	DF	CRO	Mateo Jurić-Petrašilo (from (Croatia) Hajduk Split)
4	DF	CRO	Franjo Prce (from (Slovenia) Koper)
7	MF	POR	Bernardo Couto (from (Portugal) Braga B)
8	MF	SVK	Filip Lesniak (from (Georgia (country)) Telavi)
9	FW	FRA	Franck Rivollier (from (Israel) Hapoel Afula)
16	MF	CRO	Christian Ilić (from (Romania) Dinamo București)
18	FW	BUL	Daniel Ivanov (from Chernomorets Burgas)
21	DF	GUI	Pa Konate (from (Cyprus) Nea Salamis Famagusta)
39	MF	BUL	Antonio Vutov (from CSKA 1948)
76	GK	BUL	Martin Velichkov (from Etar)
88	DF	BUL	Radoslav Dimitrov (from (Romania) Botoșani)

Out:

No.	Pos.	Nation	Player
2	DF	BUL	Velislav Boev (to Dobrudzha)
3	DF	BUL	Preslav Petrov (to Dunav Ruse)
4	DF	BUL	Radoslav Terziev (to Hebar)
7	MF	BUL	Georgi Babaliev (released)
8	MF	BUL	Tsvetoslav Petrov (released)
10	MF	BUL	Rumen Rumenov (end of contract)
13	MF	BUL	Georgi Mariyanov (released)
18	MF	BUL	Hidayet Hyusein (released)
19	FW	BEL	Jamie Yayi Mpie (released)
23	GK	BUL	Georgi Georgiev (released)
31	MF	UKR	Dmytro Semeniv (released)
67	GK	BUL	Denislav Zhekov (on loan to Lovech)
78	MF	BUL	Velislav Minkov (released)
81	DF	BUL	Atanas Zehirov (released)

== Second League ==
=== Belasitsa ===
In:

No.	Pos.	Nation	Player
9	FW	FIN	Irfan Sadik (from (Finland) JäPS)
17	DF	BUL	Rafail Parlikov (from CSKA 1948 II)
26	MF	BUL	Hristoslav Yachev (from CSKA Sofia II)
52	FW	BRA	Lucas Grossi (from (Brazil) Portuguesa Santista)

Out:

No.	Pos.	Nation	Player
9	FW	BUL	Mariyan Vangelov (to Dunav Ruse)
17	FW	BUL	Zapro Dinev (to Pirin Blagoevgrad)
18	DF	BUL	Petar Kepov (to Lovech)
19	DF	BUL	Hristo Petrov (to Pirin Blagoevgrad)
80	FW	BUL	Daniel Gogov (to Kyustendil)

=== Botev Plovdiv II ===
In:

No.	Pos.	Nation	Player

Out:

No.	Pos.	Nation	Player
30	FW	BUL	Ivo Kazakov (to Arda Kardzhali)
99	GK	BUL	Stefan Smarkalev (to (Germany) Werder Bremen U19)

=== CSKA 1948 II ===
In:

No.	Pos.	Nation	Player
48	MF	CRO	Robert Marijanovic (from (Croatia) Šibenik)
55	DF	BUL	Asen Georgiev (from Etar)
—	DF	BUL	Svetoslav Slavov (from Neftochimic)
—	FW	SEN	El-Hadji Ba (from (Norway) Grorud IL)
—	DF	BUL	Stefan Tsonkov (loan return from Hebar)

Out:

No.	Pos.	Nation	Player
55	DF	BUL	Rafail Parlikov (to Belasitsa Petrich)
98	FW	BUL	Valentin Yoskov (to Pirin Blagoevgrad)
—	DF	BUL	Stefan Tsonkov (released)

=== CSKA Sofia II ===
In:

No.	Pos.	Nation	Player
1	GK	BUL	Boyan Zagorski (from Hebar)

Out:

No.	Pos.	Nation	Player
2	DF	BUL	Yoan Lozanov (released)
12	GK	BUL	Ivaylo Nedelchev (to Lovech)
14	DF	BUL	Brayan Stefkov (to Lovech)
16	FW	BUL	Georgi Dimitrov (to Lovech)
—	MF	BUL	Hristoslav Yachev (to Belasitsa Petrich)

=== Dobrudzha ===
In:

No.	Pos.	Nation	Player
4	DF	BUL	Petko Ganev (from Botev Vratsa)
5	DF	BUL	Ivailo Minchev (from Chernomorets Balchik)
7	FW	BUL	Anton Ivanov (from Sportist Svoge)
8	MF	BRA	Lucas Cardoso (from Chernomorets Balchik)
9	FW	BUL	Georgio Dimitrov (from Chernomorets Balchik)
10	MF	BUL	Rumen Rumenov (from Spartak Varna)
11	FW	BUL	Kitan Vasilev (from Krumovgrad)
13	GK	BUL	Galin Grigorov (from Cherno More)
15	DF	BUL	Bogdan Kostov (from Montana)
27	DF	BUL	Velislav Boev (from Spartak Varna)
33	FW	BRA	Michael (from Cherno More)
75	MF	BUL	Petar Georgiev (from Ludogorets II)

Out:

No.	Pos.	Nation	Player
4	DF	BUL	Boris Ivanov (to Pirin Blagoevgrad)
6	DF	BUL	Georgi Pashov (end of contract)
8	MF	BUL	Milen Gamakov (to Hebar Pazardzhik)
9	FW	BUL	Preslav Yordanov (to Etar)
14	DF	BUL	Stiliyan Nikolov (end of contract)

=== Dunav Ruse ===
In:

No.	Pos.	Nation	Player
1	GK	BUL	Ivan Goshev (from Sportist Svoge)
6	DF	BUL	Preslav Petrov (from Spartak Varna)
8	MF	BUL	Zhak Pehlivanov (from Krumovgrad)
23	FW	BUL	Mariyan Vangelov (from Belasitsa Petrich)
26	DF	BUL	Kamen Hadzhiev (from Chernomorets Burgas)
77	FW	FRA	Jonathan N'Sondé (from Sportist Svoge)
—	DF	BFA	Eliseé Sou (from (Ivory Coast) SOL FC)

Out:

No.	Pos.	Nation	Player
4	DF	BUL	Georgi Ivanov (released)
6	MF	BUL	Nikola Kolev (released)
8	MF	UKR	Stanislav Nechyporenko (released)
9	FW	BUL	Miroslav Budinov (retired)
13	DF	BUL	Galin Minkov (released)
69	GK	BUL	Damyan Damyanov (released)
77	DF	BUL	Georgi Valchev (released)
99	MF	ESP	Samuel Nakov-Fuentes (released)

=== Etar ===
In:

No.	Pos.	Nation	Player
2	DF	BUL	Petar Ivanov (from Cherno More)
3	DF	BUL	Asen Georgiev (from Septemvri Sofia)
6	MF	BUL	Filip Angelov (from Chernomorets Burgas)
9	FW	BUL	Preslav Yordanov (from Dobrudzha)
10	MF	BUL	Aykut Ramadan (from Septemvri Sofia)
11	MF	BUL	Georgi Babaliev (from Spartak Varna)
12	GK	BUL	Stanislav Nistorov (from Chernomorets Burgas)
17	FW	BUL	Ivan Kokonov (from Arda)
27	FW	FRA	Ibrahim Keita (from (Slovenia) Tabor Sežana)

Out:

No.	Pos.	Nation	Player
2	DF	MEX	Josecarlos Van Rankin (released)
3	DF	BUL	Asen Georgiev (released)
5	DF	FRA	Kelyan Guessoum (released)
6	MF	ESP	Gorka Larrucea (released)
8	MF	PAN	Martín Morán (loan return to (Panama) C.A. Independiente)
9	FW	BUL	Ivan Vasilev (to Botev Vratsa)
10	FW	CRO	Lovre Knežević (released)
12	GK	SLO	Kristijan Sekulić (released)
14	FW	BUL	Ivaylo Dimitrov (retired)
15	DF	BUL	Georgi Angelov (end of contract)
19	FW	MKD	Aleksandar Mishov (released)
20	FW	RSA	Jaisen Clifford (released)
22	GK	BUL	Martin Velichkov (to Spartak Varna)
23	MF	NGR	Moses Candidus (loan return to Botev Plovdiv II)
24	MF	FRA	Chano (released)
25	DF	BUL	Krum Stoyanov (end of contract)
33	DF	ECU	Luis Córdova (loan return to (Ecuador) Deportivo Cuenca)
94	DF	FRA	Jean-Marc Tiboué (released)

=== Fratria ===
In:

No.	Pos.	Nation	Player
1	GK	BUL	Stefan Petkov (from Spartak Varna II)
3	DF	BUL	Aleksandar Angelov (from Lovech)
7	FW	BUL	Denislav Angelov (from (Belgium) Eendracht Aalst)
14	DF	BUL	Dimitar Burov (from Montana)
18	MF	MDA	Vasile Bitlan (from (Moldova) Dacia Buiucani)
21	FW	BUL	Iliyan Kapitanov (from Lovech)
23	MF	BUL	Emil Yanchev (from Montana)
33	GK	BUL	Georgi Kitanov (from (Malta) Floriana)
77	FW	BUL	Georgi Lazarov (from Spartak Plovdiv)

Out:

No.	Pos.	Nation	Player
10	MF	BUL	Yancho Andreev (released)
14	DF	BUL	Dimitar Burov (released)
16	DF	BUL	Dimitar Vasilev (to Septemvri Tervel)
19	DF	BUL	Nikola Borisov (released)
20	MF	BUL	Ivelin Kuzmanov (to Septemvri Tervel)
32	DF	BUL	Valeri Hristov (to Septemvri Tervel)
39	FW	UKR	Denys Vasin (retired)
45	DF	ARM	David Shakaryan (released)
67	GK	BUL	Hristiyan Hristov (released)
99	FW	BRA	Lucas Macedo (released)

=== Lovech ===
In:

No.	Pos.	Nation	Player
5	DF	BUL	Nasko Yankov (from Cherno More II)
6	DF	BUL	Brayan Stefkov (from CSKA Sofia II)
9	FW	BUL	Georgi Dimitrov (from CSKA Sofia II)
12	GK	BUL	Ivaylo Nedelchev (from CSKA Sofia II)
18	DF	BUL	Petar Kepov (from Belasitsa Petrich)
21	MF	BUL	Simeon Ivanov (from Bdin Vidin)
22	MF	BUL	Denis Georgiev (from Sevlievo)
26	MF	BUL	Kristiyan Valkov (from Lokomotiv Mezdra)
—	GK	BUL	Denislav Zhekov (on loan from Spartak Varna)

Out:

No.	Pos.	Nation	Player
3	DF	BUL	Aleksandar Angelov (to Fratria)
4	MF	BUL	Georgi Staykov (released)
5	DF	BUL	Mihail Minkov (to Lokomotiv Gorna Oryahovitsa)
14	DF	BUL	Vasil Vasilev (end of contract)
15	DF	BUL	Ivan Penev (to Sevlievo)
18	DF	SRB	Dragan Cubra (released)
19	DF	BUL	Rosen Marinov (loan return to CSKA Sofia)
21	FW	BUL	Iliyan Kapitanov (to Fratria)
22	MF	MKD	Bozhidar Mitrevski (released)

=== Lokomotiv Gorna Oryahovitsa ===
In:

No.	Pos.	Nation	Player
3	MF	FIN	Martin Kuittinen (from (Moldova) Zimbru Chișinău)
5	DF	BUL	Mihail Minkov (from Lovech)
6	MF	BUL	Nikola Kolev (from Dunav Ruse)
13	MF	BUL	Tsvetoslav Petrov (from Spartak Varna)
16	MF	BUL	Stefan Mitev (from Chernomorets Balchik)
19	MF	BUL	Panayot Paskov (from Spartak Pleven)
33	GK	UKR	Hennadiy Hanyev (from CSKA 1948)
69	MF	BUL	Antonio Laskov (from Strumska Slava)
71	DF	BUL	Georgi Valchev (from Dunav Ruse)
89	FW	SEN	Alioune Badará (from Chernomorets Burgas)
—	MF	FRA	Dylan Junior Abé (from (Croatia) Virovitica)
—	FW	BUL	Hristo Hristov (from Dimitrovgrad)
—	FW	BUL	Rosen Dimitrov (from Rozova Dolina)

Out:

No.	Pos.	Nation	Player
8	FW	BUL	Hristo Markov (to Pavlikeni)
9	FW	BUL	Dimitar Baydakov (to Sevlievo)
11	MF	BUL	Krasen Trifonov (retired)
19	FW	BUL	Todor Bakardzhiev (to Pavlikeni)
20	MF	BUL	Nikolay Ivanov (to Yantra Polski Trambesh)
23	MF	BUL	Yavor Genchev (to Yantra Polski Trambesh)
71	FW	BUL	Rostislav Danchev (to Pavlikeni)
86	DF	BUL	Ivaylo Todorov (to Pavlikeni)

=== Ludogorets II ===
In:

No.	Pos.	Nation	Player
—	DF	BUL	Ilker Budinov (loan return from Botev Vratsa)

Out:

No.	Pos.	Nation	Player
45	FW	BUL	Davor Iliev (to Spartak Plovdiv)
69	GK	BUL	Plamen Pepelyashev (on loan to Nesebar)
75	MF	BUL	Petar Georgiev (to Dobrudzha)
97	FW	BUL	Vladislav Naydenov (to Botev Vratsa)
—	DF	BUL	Ilker Budinov (on loan to Arda)

=== Marek ===
In:

No.	Pos.	Nation	Player
5	DF	BUL	Mario Petkov (from (Romania) Ceahlăul)
6	DF	BUL	Ivan Arsov (from Septemvri Sofia)
9	FW	BUL	Iliya Dimitrov (from (Romania) Unirea Slobozia)
17	MF	BUL	Teodor Ivanov (on loan from Lokomotiv Sofia)
19	FW	BUL	Aleksandar Asparuhov (from Montana)
—	MF	BUL	Lazar Stoychev (from Strumska Slava)

Out:

No.	Pos.	Nation	Player
5	DF	BUL	Boyan Stoynev (to Kyustendil)
71	MF	BUL	Dimitar Iliev (to Kyustendil)
—	MF	BUL	Lazar Stoychev (to Pirin Razlog)

=== Minyor ===
In:

No.	Pos.	Nation	Player
2	DF	BUL	Mario Dadakov (from (Slovakia) Nové Mesto nad Váhom)
3	DF	BUL	Pavlin Chilikov (from Sportist Svoge)
4	DF	BUL	Dimitar Avramov (from Maritsa Plovdiv)
5	MF	BUL	Valentin Petrov (from Slavia Sofia II)
9	FW	BUL	Mario Georgiev (from Slavia Sofia II)
15	MF	BUL	Vladimir Semerdzhiev (from Sportist Svoge)
22	MF	BUL	Petar Vutsov (from Yantra Gabrovo)
23	MF	BUL	Yordan Yordanov (from Septemvri Sofia)

Out:

No.	Pos.	Nation	Player
3	DF	BUL	Anton Slavchev (to Oborishte)
4	DF	BUL	Viktor Stoykov (to Botev Ihtiman)
5	MF	BUL	Veselin Vasev (to Botev Ihtiman)
24	DF	BUL	Georgi Kupenov (to Kyustendil)
26	FW	BUL	Deyan Hristov (to Vitosha Bistritsa)

=== Montana ===
In:

No.	Pos.	Nation	Player
16	MF	BUL	Daniel Kabanelas (from Chernomorets Burgas)
17	DF	BUL	Galin Minkov (from Dunav Ruse)
20	DF	BUL	Borislav Vakadinov (from Chernomorets Burgas)
21	DF	BUL	Kaloyan Mitev (from Akademik Svishtov)
24	MF	FRA	Wilfried Raymond Kouakou (from Sevlievo)
—	DF	BUL	Dimitar Burov (from Fratria)
—	FW	BUL	Martin Sorakov (on loan from Slavia Sofia)

Out:

No.	Pos.	Nation	Player
14	DF	BUL	Dimitar Burov (to Fratria)
15	DF	BUL	Bogdan Kostov (to Dobrudzha)
16	FW	BUL	Aleksandar Asparuhov (to Marek)
21	DF	BUL	Kaloyan Mitev (released)

=== Nesebar ===
In:

No.	Pos.	Nation	Player
5	DF	BUL	Plamen Dimov (from (Greece) Aiolikos)
11	FW	BUL	Viktor Yanev (free agent)
13	MF	BUL	Dimitar Ivanov (from Chernomorets Burgas)
14	DF	BUL	Dimitar Balinov (from Spartak Plovdiv)
33	GK	BUL	Plamen Pepelyashev (on loan from Ludogorets II)
37	MF	BUL	Petar Peychev (from Chernomorets Burgas)

Out:

No.	Pos.	Nation	Player
13	DF	BUL	Georgi Tuzakov (released)
19	MF	BUL	Petar Zelyamov (released)

=== Pirin Blagoevgrad ===
In:

No.	Pos.	Nation	Player
4	DF	BUL	Boris Ivanov (from Dobrudzha)
6	MF	BUL	Bogomil Bozhurkin (from Hebar)
7	MF	BUL	Georgi Valchev (from Hebar)
9	FW	FRA	Gobé Gouano (from (France) Orléans B)
11	FW	UKR	Bohdan Kovalenko (from (Spain) Colunga)
15	MF	BUL	Denis Buchev (from Rilski Sportist)
16	MF	BUL	Nikola Bandev (from Levski Sofia II)
17	FW	BUL	Zapro Dinev (from Belasitsa Petrich)
18	FW	CAF	Karl Namnganda (from (Iraq) Karbala)
20	MF	BLR	Vladimir Medved (loan return from Lokomotiv Plovdiv)
71	DF	BUL	Hristo Petrov (from Belasitsa Petrich)
76	GK	BUL	Krasimir Kostov (from Botev Vratsa)
98	FW	BUL	Valentin Yoskov (from CSKA 1948 II)
99	MF	MDA	Ilie Botnari (from (Moldova) Dacia Buiucani)

Out:

No.	Pos.	Nation	Player
4	MF	MAR	Ayoub Abou (to (Armenia) Urartu)
6	DF	BUL	Andrey Yordanov (to Botev Plovdiv)
7	DF	BUL	Asen Donchev (loan return to CSKA Sofia)
11	FW	BUL	Ivan Tasev (to CSKA Sofia)
12	GK	UKR	Maksym Kovalyov (to (Romania) Oțelul Galați)
14	FW	UKR	Danylo Polonskyi (to Lokomotiv Plovdiv)
19	FW	FRA	Hugo Komano (to (Switzerland) Yverdon-Sport)
20	MF	BLR	Vladimir Medved (released)
27	DF	BUL	Georgi Varbanov (to Septemvri Sofia)
28	DF	LAT	Vitālijs Jagodinskis (to (Cambodia) Visakha)
73	MF	BUL	Ventsislav Bengyuzov (released)
77	DF	FRA	Modou Diagne (to (Romania) Universitatea Craiova)
83	DF	BUL	Hristo Popadiyn (end of contract)

=== Spartak Pleven ===
In:

No.	Pos.	Nation	Player
3	DF	NGR	Solomon James (from Maritsa)
4	DF	NGR	Ifeanyi David (from Maritsa)
22	MF	BUL	Preslav Georgiev (from Septemvri Sofia)
26	DF	BUL	Daniel Stoyanov (from Bdin Vidin)

Out:

No.	Pos.	Nation	Player
1	GK	BUL	Stanislav Antonov (released)
4	DF	GRE	Athanasios Pitsolis (to Lokomotiv Sofia)
14	MF	BUL	Borimir Karamfilov (to Sayana)
17	DF	BUL	Yordan Zhelev (to Rozova Dolina)
21	MF	BUL	Panayot Paskov (to Lokomotiv Gorna Oryahovitsa)
22	FW	BUL	Martin Ganchev (to Yantra)

=== Sportist Svoge ===
In:

No.	Pos.	Nation	Player
1	GK	CPV	Dylan Silva (from (Portugal) Sintrense)
7	MF	CPV	Paulo Soares (from Dobrudzha)
8	FW	BUL	Hristiyan Dimitrov (from Vihren Sandanski)
10	MF	BUL	Teodor Totev (from Chernomorets Balchik)
14	MF	BUL	Emil Kyosov (from Slavia Sofia II)
16	DF	BUL	Kristiyan Hristov (from Slavia Sofia II)
87	MF	BUL	Blagovest Danchev (from (Germany) SV Wilhelmshaven)
99	FW	RSA	Jaisen Clifford (from Etar)

Out:

No.	Pos.	Nation	Player
7	MF	BUL	Arif Feradov (to Spartak Plovdiv)
10	MF	BUL	Vladimir Semerdzhiev (to Minyor Pernik)
15	FW	BUL	Svetoslav Dikov (released)
22	DF	BUL	Pavlin Chilikov (to Minyor Pernik)
73	DF	BUL	Dilyan Georgiev (to Botev Vratsa)
77	GK	BUL	Ivan Goshev (to Dunav)
87	FW	BUL	Anton Ivanov (to Dobrudzha)
99	FW	FRA	Jonathan N'Sondé (end of contract)

=== Strumska Slava ===
In:

No.	Pos.	Nation	Player
13	MF	BUL	Georgi Mariyanov (from Spartak Varna)
17	DF	BUL	Aleksandar Aleksandrov (free agent)
—	MF	BUL	Lazar Stoychev (from Pirin Razlog)

Out:

No.	Pos.	Nation	Player
4	MF	BUL	Lazar Stoychev (to Marek)
10	MF	BUL	Antonio Laskov (released)
11	11	BUL	Yordan Todorov (released)
17	DF	BUL	Ahmed Ademov (to Kyustendil)

=== Yantra ===
In:

No.	Pos.	Nation	Player
8	MF	BUL	Stanislav Dyulgerov (from Arda)
9	FW	BUL	Martin Toshev (from Septemvri Sofia)
15	MF	BUL	Martin Raynov (from Hebar)
22	FW	BUL	Martin Ganchev (from Spartak Pleven)
99	DF	BUL	Hristo Mitev (from Arda)

Out:

No.	Pos.	Nation	Player
9	FW	BUL	Aleksandar Petrov (to Lokomotiv Sofia)
17	MF	BUL	Petar Vutsov (released)
20	MF	BUL	Lachezar Yordanov (released)
20	MF	BUL	Velislav Vasilev (loan return to Cherno More)
22	FW	BUL	Daniel Mladenov (to Kyustendil)
