= List of Bulgarian football transfers winter 2024–25 =

This is a list of Bulgarian football transfers for the 2024-25 winter transfer window. Only transfers involving a team from the two professional leagues, First League and Second League are listed.

== First League ==
=== Arda ===
In:

No.	Pos.	Nation	Player
8	FW	BUL	Svetoslav Kovachev (on loan from (Russia) Akhmat Grozny)
11	FW	BRA	Andre Shinyashiki (from (Azerbaijan) Neftçi)
12	GK	BUL	Ivaylo Nedelchev (from Lovech)
20	MF	BUL	Serkan Yusein (from Krumovgrad)
21	DF	UKR	Vyacheslav Velyev (from Krumovgrad)

Out:

No.	Pos.	Nation	Player
4	DF	BUL	Milen Stoev (to Spartak Varna)
8	MF	TUR	Baran Aksaka (loan return to (Turkey) Galatasaray)
11	FW	BUL	Boris Tyutyukov (to (Serbia) Radnički Niš)
17	DF	BUL	Ilker Budinov (loan return to Ludogorets II)
18	DF	AZE	Cəlal Hüseynov (on loan to (Azerbaijan) Shamakhi)

=== Beroe ===
In:

No.	Pos.	Nation	Player
10	MF	BRA	Werick Caetano (loan return from (Vietnam) Da Nang)
12	DF	BUL	Martin Georgiev (from Pirin Blagoevgrad)
20	FW	URU	Gianluca Colla (from (Uruguay) Deutscher)
25	DF	POR	João Milheirão (free agent)

Out:

No.	Pos.	Nation	Player
6	DF	ESP	Felipe Chacartegui (to (Spain) Atlético Antoniano)
10	MF	ARG	Francisco Politino (released)
12	MF	BRA	Vinicius Belotti (to (Brazil) Amazonas)
20	MF	URU	Manuel Monzeglio (loan return to (Uruguay) Nacional)

=== Botev Plovdiv ===
In:

No.	Pos.	Nation	Player
52	DF	NED	Jamal Amofa (from (Netherlands) Go Ahead Eagles)
—	MF	FRA	Édouard Soumah-Abbad (on loan from (France) FC Metz B)

Out:

No.	Pos.	Nation	Player
19	DF	GUI	Antoine Conte (to (Turkey) Iğdır)
22	GK	POL	Daniel Kajzer (to (Poland) Warta Poznań)
23	MF	BUL	Dimitar Tonev (to Cherno More)
27	DF	CIV	Siriky Diabate (on loan to Botev Vratsa)
40	FW	NGA	Christian Nwachukwu (to (England) Sheffield United)
—	FW	NGA	Malik Odeyinka (on loan to (Armenia) Van, previously on loan at (Russia) Arsenal Tula)
—	FW	LTU	Faustas Steponavičius (on loan to (Lithuania) Panevėžys, previously on loan at Septemvri Sofia)

=== Botev Vratsa ===
In:

No.	Pos.	Nation	Player
2	DF	MAR	Hamza Ait Allal (free agent)
4	DF	KOS	Arian Kabashi (free agent)
7	FW	BUL	Mark-Emilio Papazov (on loan from CSKA Sofia)
14	FW	BUL	Preslav Bachev (on loan from Levski Sofia)
25	GK	BUL	Dimitar Evtimov (on loan from CSKA Sofia)
27	DF	CIV	Siriky Diabate (on loan from Botev Plovdiv)
28	MF	FRA	Quentin Bena (from (Lithuania) Kauno Žalgiris)
77	MF	BUL	Kristiyan Yovov (on loan from Levski Sofia)
98	MF	BRA	Ewerton Potiguar (from (Brazil) Santa Cruz de Natal)

Out:

No.	Pos.	Nation	Player
1	GK	BUL	Lyubomir Vasilev (to Lovech)
7	FW	BUL	Ivan Vasilev (to Krumovgrad)
8	FW	UKR	Danylo Kondrakov (to Hebar)
17	MF	BUL	Chavdar Ivaylov (on loan to Belasitsa Petrich)
20	DF	CGO	Messie Biatoumoussoka (to (Georgia (country)) Dinamo Batumi)
25	DF	BUL	Deyan Lozev (to Spartak Varna)
77	MF	BUL	Stefan Velev (to Botev Ihtiman)
33	DF	BUL	Stefan Tsonkov (to Hebar)

=== Cherno More ===
In:

No.	Pos.	Nation	Player
11	FW	GUI	Thierno Barry (on loan from (Cyprus) Enosis Neon Paralimni)
23	MF	BUL	Dimitar Tonev (from Botev Plovdiv)
39	MF	BUL	Nikolay Zlatev (loan return from (Slovenia) Tabor Sežana)

Out:

No.	Pos.	Nation	Player
11	MF	BRA	Dudu Rodrigues (to (Greece) Aris Thessaloniki)
13	FW	ROU	Claudiu Keșerü (retired)
23	MF	POR	Edgar Pacheco (released)
88	MF	BRA	Renan Areias (loan return to Krumovgrad)
91	MF	BUL	Velislav Vasilev (to Yantra Gabrovo)
—	MF	BUL	Aleksandar Veselinski (to Marek, previously on loan at Sportist Svoge)

=== CSKA Sofia ===
In:

No.	Pos.	Nation	Player
4	DF	ESP	Adrián Lapeña (from (Spain) Córdoba)
21	GK	BLR	Fyodor Lapoukhov (from (Belarus) Dinamo Minsk)
28	FW	CYP	Ioannis Pittas (from (Sweden) AIK)

Out:

No.	Pos.	Nation	Player
4	DF	BUL	Hristiyan Petrov (to (Netherlands) Heerenveen)
14	DF	NOR	Tobias Heintz (to (Sweden) IFK Göteborg)
17	DF	AUT	Emanuel Šakić (released)
21	MF	CTA	Amos Youga (to (Hungary) Debrecen)
28	FW	BUL	Mark-Emilio Papazov (on loan to Botev Vratsa)
77	FW	CTA	Goduine Koyalipou (to (France) Lens)
—	GK	BUL	Dimitar Evtimov (on loan to Botev Vratsa)
—	DF	NED	Bradley de Nooijer (to (Romania) Gloria Buzău)

=== CSKA 1948 ===
In:

No.	Pos.	Nation	Player
3	DF	BUL	Mario Petkov (from Marek)
—	FW	BUL	Kaloyan Krastev (from Hebar)

Out:

No.	Pos.	Nation	Player
28	MF	SRB	Nedeljko Piščević (to (Montenegro) Budućnost Podgorica)
31	DF	MTQ	Tom Rapnouil (released)
33	GK	BUL	Aleks Bozhev (to (Czech Republic) Slavia Prague)
39	MF	TJK	Parvizdzhon Umarbayev (on loan to Lokomotiv Plovdiv)
61	MF	BRA	Octávio (to Lokomotiv Sofia)
91	DF	CGO	Ryan Bidounga (to Lokomotiv Sofia)
99	FW	BUL	Mario Topuzov (to Pirin Blagoevgrad)

=== Hebar ===
In:

No.	Pos.	Nation	Player
1	GK	SUR	Ishan Kort (from (Lithuania) Be1 NFA)
2	DF	CRO	Dominik Pavlek (from (Croatia) Dubrava)
7	FW	ALG	Selman Nassar-Chouiter (from (France) Cannet Rocheville)
8	MF	CRO	Branimir Cavar (from (Croatia) Dubrava)
9	FW	BUL	Toma Ushagelov (from (Iceland) Ægir)
11	FW	ALG	Yanis Guermouche (from Krumovgrad)
19	DF	CRO	Toni Vidovic (from (Croatia) Uskok)
20	DF	SRB	Miloš Petrović (from Lokomotiv Plovdiv)
23	DF	BUL	Ilker Budinov (from Ludogorets II)
29	MF	CRO	Mario Zebic (from (Maldives) Maziya)
55	FW	BIH	Boze Vukoja (free agent)
70	FW	GER	Kenan Dünnwald-Turan (free agent)
88	DF	BIH	Omar Pašagić (from (Greece) Kavala)
98	MF	CUW	Nathan Markelo (from (Netherlands) Roda)
—	DF	BUL	Stefan Tsonkov (from Botev Vratsa)
—	MF	BUL	Iliya Rusinov (from Montana)
—	FW	UKR	Danylo Kondrakov (from Botev Vratsa)

Out:

No.	Pos.	Nation	Player
1	GK	BUL	Petar Debarliev (to Sportist Svoge)
7	MF	UKR	Oleksiy Zbun (released)
9	FW	BUL	Kaloyan Krastev (to CSKA 1948)
10	MF	BUL	Atanas Kabov (to (Turkey) Sakaryaspor)
20	MF	CRO	Marko Brtan (released)
23	DF	BUL	Kaloyan Pehlivanov (to (United States) AV Alta FC)
24	DF	FRA	Enzo El Fattahi (released)
29	FW	SEN	Cheikh Diamanka (to (Japan) Fujieda MYFC)
55	DF	BUL	Martin Mihaylov (to Montana)
77	MF	BUL	Oktay Hamdiev (to Dobrudzha)
88	MF	FRA	Josué Ntoya (released)
98	MF	BUL	Georgi Tartov (to Krumovgrad)

=== Krumovgrad ===
In:

No.	Pos.	Nation	Player
4	DF	FRA	Steven N'Guessan (from (Switzerland) Stade Lausanne Ouchy)
5	DF	CTA	Peter Guinari (from (Germany) Türkgücü München)
6	MF	ESP	Imanol Alonso (from (Spain) Alcorcón)
9	FW	BUL	Ivan Vasilev (from Botev Vratsa)
10	MF	ROU	Cătălin Itu (from (Romania) Politehnica Iași)
13	DF	BUL	Arhan Isuf (from (Albania) Tirana)
14	DF	VEN	Adrián Cova (free agent)
27	FW	FRA	Ibrahim Keita (from Etar)
69	DF	FRA	Sanasi Sy (free agent)
70	FW	POR	Tiago Veiga (from (Portugal) Oliveirense)
98	MF	BUL	Georgi Tartov (from Hebar)
—	DF	GAB	Sidney Obissa (from (Belgium) Seraing)
—	DF	BUL	Radoslav Uzunov (from Rodopa Smolyan)
—	MF	BEL	Joachim Carcela (from Etar)
—	MF	SEN	Malick Fall (from (Belgium) Beveren)

Out:

No.	Pos.	Nation	Player
2	DF	BUL	Dzhuneyt Ali (to Lokomotiv Sofia)
5	DF	CRO	Matej Šimić (to (Romania) Sepsi)
10	MF	BUL	Serkan Yusein (to Arda Kardzhali)
11	MF	BUL	Aleksandar Georgiev (to Spartak Varna)
44	MF	BUL	Bozhidar Katsarov (to Lokomotiv Sofia)
70	FW	BRA	Matheus Souza (to (South Korea) Gyeongnam)
99	FW	ALG	Yanis Guermouche (to Hebar)
—	MF	BRA	Renan Areias (to (South Korea) Gyeongnam, previously on loan at Cherno More)

=== Levski Sofia ===
In:

No.	Pos.	Nation	Player
17	FW	BRA	Everton Bala (from (Brazil) Mirassol, previously on loan)
18	MF	SVN	Gašper Trdin (from (Slovenia) Bravo)
70	MF	BUL	Georgi Kostadinov (from (Cyprus) APOEL)
71	DF	FRA	Oliver Kamdem (from Lokomotiv Plovdiv)
92	GK	BUL	Svetoslav Vutsov (from Slavia Sofia)
95	FW	MTQ	Karl Fabien (from Slavia Sofia)

Out:

No.	Pos.	Nation	Player
16	FW	BUL	Preslav Bachev (on loan to Botev Vratsa)
19	MF	BUL	Kristiyan Yovov (on loan to Botev Vratsa)
22	DF	BUL	Patrik-Gabriel Galchev (on loan to Lokomotiv Sofia)
30	MF	NGA	Clement Ikenna (on loan to (Ukraine) Kryvbas Kryvyi Rih)
99	GK	BUL	Ivan Andonov (to Slavia Sofia)

=== Lokomotiv Plovdiv ===
In:

No.	Pos.	Nation	Player
1	GK	SUI	Bojan Milosavljević (from (Cyprus) Anorthosis)
20	MF	POR	Diogo Abreu (from (Portugal) Sporting CP B)
21	DF	POL	Patryk Stępiński (from (Greece) Chania)
39	MF	TJK	Parvizdzhon Umarbayev (on loan from CSKA 1948)
—	DF	NOR	Tobias Bjørnstad (from (Norway) Örebro SK)
—	FW	SVN	Lovro Bizjak (free agent)

Out:

No.	Pos.	Nation	Player
4	DF	BUL	Martin Paskalev (to (Bosnia and Herzegovina) Sarajevo)
7	MF	UKR	Danylo Polonskyi (released)
17	FW	BUL	Nicholas Penev (to Pirin Blagoevgrad)
20	DF	SRB	Miloš Petrović (to Hebar)
33	MF	BUL	Georgi Karakashev (to Dobrudzha)
71	DF	FRA	Oliver Kamdem (to Levski Sofia)
75	MF	FRA	Johan Nzi (released)
88	GK	BUL	Martin Lukov (released)

=== Lokomotiv Sofia ===
In:

No.	Pos.	Nation	Player
1	GK	BUL	Dragomir Petkov (from Strumska Slava)
7	FW	BUL	Spas Delev (from Ludogorets)
22	DF	BUL	Dzhuneyt Ali (from Krumovgrad)
44	MF	BUL	Bozhidar Katsarov (from Krumovgrad)
58	MF	BRA	Octávio (from CSKA 1948)
91	DF	CGO	Ryan Bidounga (from CSKA 1948)

Out:

No.	Pos.	Nation	Player
4	DF	MKD	Dime Dimov (to (Indonesia) Persebaya)
7	FW	BUL	Aleksandar Petrov (to Nesebar)
10	MF	BUL	Valentin Nikolov (to Septemvri Sofia)
14	MF	BUL	Mihail Chilikov (to Minyor Pernik)
22	MF	BUL	Ivaylo Naydenov (to Slavia Sofia)
47	DF	HAI	Stéphane Lambese (released)
98	FW	BEN	Steve Traoré (to (Finland) Haka)

=== Ludogorets ===
In:

No.	Pos.	Nation	Player
10	FW	FRA	Antoine Baroan (on loan from (Switzerland) Winterthur)
25	FW	COL	Emerson Rodríguez (from (United States) Inter Miami)
29	FW	CIV	Eric Bile (from (Slovakia) Žilina)
55	DF	BRA	Pedro Henrique (loan return from (Brazil) Guarani)

Out:

No.	Pos.	Nation	Player
7	FW	BRA	Rick (to (Argentina) Talleres de Córdoba)
10	FW	ARG	Matías Tissera (on loan to (Argentina) Huracán)
12	FW	BRA	Rwan Cruz (to (Brazil) Botafogo)
21	FW	BRA	Raí (to (Brazil) Guarani)
90	FW	BUL	Spas Delev (to Lokomotiv Sofia)

=== Septemvri Sofia ===
In:

No.	Pos.	Nation	Player
2	DF	NGA	Valentine Ozornwafor (free agent)
7	FW	ESP	Moi Parra (from (Spain) Coria)
18	MF	BUL	Valentin Nikolov (from Lokomotiv Sofia)
33	MF	BUL	Galin Ivanov (from Slavia Sofia)

Out:

No.	Pos.	Nation	Player
7	FW	BUL	Nikolay Drosev (to Nesebar)
13	DF	CYP	Strahinja Kerkez (to (Lithuania) Panevėžys)
14	MF	FRA	Jean-Pierre Da Sylva (to (Finland) Haka)
20	FW	LTU	Faustas Steponavičius (loan return to Botev Plovdiv)
28	MF	CMR	Franck Ellé (to (Finland) KTP)

=== Slavia Sofia ===
In:

No.	Pos.	Nation	Player
8	MF	BUL	Aykut Ramadan (from Etar)
—	DF	RUS	Artyom Varganov (from (Russia) Pari NN-2)
—	MF	BUL	Ivaylo Naydenov (from Lokomotiv Sofia)

Out:

No.	Pos.	Nation	Player
23	FW	BUL	Tsvetelin Chunchukov (released)
33	MF	BUL	Galin Ivanov (to Septemvri Sofia)

=== Spartak Varna ===
In:

No.	Pos.	Nation	Player
4	DF	AUT	Felix Strauß (from (Finland) Lahti)
9	FW	BUL	Dimitar Mitkov (from (Tajikistan) Istiklol)
13	MF	BUL	Aleksandar Georgiev (from Krumovgrad)
19	DF	BUL	Milen Stoev (from Arda Kardzhali)
20	DF	BUL	Deyan Lozev (from Botev Vratsa)
24	GK	UKR	Maksym Kovalyov (from (Romania) Oțelul)
99	FW	LBR	Kolako Johnson (from (Nigeria) Giant Brillars)
—	MF	GHA	Gideon Akuowua (free agent)
—	FW	BRA	Xandy (free agent)
—	FW	JPN	Atsushi Kurokawa (from (Japan) Machida Zelvia)

Out:

No.	Pos.	Nation	Player
4	DF	CRO	Franjo Prce (released)
9	FW	FRA	Franck Rivollier (to (Israel) Hapoel Petah Tikva)
17	MF	BUL	Tsvetoslav Marinov (on loan to Lovech)
29	FW	BUL	Ahmed Ahmedov (to (Japan) Shimizu S-Pulse)
99	FW	BUL	Daniel Halachev (on loan to Lovech)

== Second League ==
=== Belasitsa ===
In:

No.	Pos.	Nation	Player
8	MF	ESP	Yadam Santana (from (Spain) Arucas)
11	MF	BUL	Chavdar Ivaylov (on loan from Botev Vratsa)

Out:

No.	Pos.	Nation	Player
2	MF	CMR	Kufre Eta (to CSKA 1948 II)
6	MF	BUL	Simeon Boyadzhiev (released)
8	MF	BUL	Zhivko Dimitrov (to Bansko)
11	MF	CIV	Axel Taonsa (to (Sweden) Västerås)
17	DF	BUL	Rafail Parlikov (to Sportist Svoge)

=== Botev Plovdiv II ===
In:

No.	Pos.	Nation	Player
—	DF	BUL	Dimitar Avramov (from Minyor Pernik)

Out:

No.	Pos.	Nation	Player

=== CSKA 1948 II ===
In:

No.	Pos.	Nation	Player
—	DF	BUL	Viktor Ergin (from Bansko)
—	MF	CMR	Kufre Eta (from Belasitsa Petrich)

Out:

No.	Pos.	Nation	Player
45	MF	BUL	Martin Atanasov (to Sportist Svoge)
55	DF	BUL	Martin Dimitrov (to (Italy) Sampdoria U20)
66	FW	BUL	Simeon Dimitrov (to Marek)
71	DF	BUL	Pavel Todorov (to Strumska Slava)
77	MF	BUL	Kristiyan Boychev (to Dunav Ruse)
—	DF	BUL	Deyan Kirilov (to Marek)

=== CSKA Sofia II ===
In:

No.	Pos.	Nation	Player

Out:

No.	Pos.	Nation	Player
—	DF	BUL	Aleksandar Ganchev (to Chernomorets Burgas)

=== Dobrudzha ===
In:

No.	Pos.	Nation	Player
9	FW	BUL	Milcho Angelov (from (Romania) Reșița)
11	MF	BUL	Dzhaner Sadetinov (from (Italy) Perugia U19)
21	MF	BUL	Georgi Karakashev (from Lokomotiv Plovdiv)
25	GK	BUL	Plamen Pepelyashev (from Ludogorets II)
75	MF	BUL	Oktay Hamdiev (from Hebar)
77	MF	BUL	Simeon Veshev (from Dunav Ruse)

Out:

No.	Pos.	Nation	Player
9	FW	BUL	Georgio Dimitrov (to Dunav Ruse)
11	FW	BUL	Kitan Vasilev (released)
21	DF	BUL	Nikolay Zhelyazkov (released)
23	MF	BRA	Jose Neto (on loan to Sportist Svoge)
33	FW	BRA	Michael (released)
75	MF	BUL	Petar Georgiev (released)

=== Dunav Ruse ===
In:

No.	Pos.	Nation	Player
9	FW	BUL	Georgio Dimitrov (from Dobrudzha)
10	MF	BUL	Kristiyan Boychev (from CSKA 1948 II)
13	DF	BUL	Mario Dilchovski (from Strumska Slava)
23	GK	MKD	Stefan Tasev (from (North Macedonia) Tikvesh)

Out:

No.	Pos.	Nation	Player
7	MF	BUL	Simeon Veshev (to Dobrudzha)
10	MF	BUL	Dimitar Zakonov (released)
17	FW	FRA	Louis Pahama (released)
18	FW	BUL	Mariyan Vangelov (released)
23	GK	BUL	Ivan Goshev (to Minyor Pernik)
29	DF	BUL	Nikolay Dichev (released)
34	MF	BUL	Oleg Dimitrov (to Kyustendil)

=== Etar ===
In:

No.	Pos.	Nation	Player
8	MF	BUL	Petar Karaangelov (from Ludogorets II)
15	MF	BUL	Antonio Georgiev (from (Romania) Gloria Buzău)
26	DF	BUL	Dimitar Iliev (from Ludogorets II)
27	MF	BUL	Kristiyan Valkov (from Lovech)
—	FW	FRA	Lhoan Claudant (from (France) SA Mérignac)

Out:

No.	Pos.	Nation	Player
10	MF	BUL	Aykut Ramadan (to Slavia Sofia)
11	MF	BUL	Georgi Babaliev (end of contract)
13	MF	FIN	Didis Lutumba-Pitah (released)
17	FW	BUL	Ivan Kokonov (released)
18	MF	BEL	Joachim Carcela (released)
27	FW	FRA	Ibrahim Keita (released)
44	DF	SEN	Serigne Mbacké Faye (released)

=== Fratria ===
In:

No.	Pos.	Nation	Player
12	GK	MDA	Igor Mostovei (from (Moldova) Milsami)
13	DF	BUL	Galin Minkov (from Montana)
24	DF	FRA	Mike Bettinger (free agent)
—	MF	FRA	Dylan Abe (from Lokomotiv Gorna Oryahovitsa)

Out:

No.	Pos.	Nation	Player
2	DF	BUL	Ivaylo Popov (to Chernomorets Balchik)
23	MF	BUL	Emil Yanchev (released)
30	DF	BUL	Denis Corso (released)
33	GK	BUL	Georgi Kitanov (released)
66	FW	BUL	Vasil Andoni (released)

=== Lovech ===
In:

No.	Pos.	Nation	Player
—	GK	UKR	Ilarion Tugay (from (Croatia) Zmaj Makarska)
—	MF	BUL	Tsvetoslav Marinov (on loan from Spartak Varna)
—	FW	BUL	Daniel Halachev (on loan from Spartak Varna)
—	FW	BUL	Georgi Atanasov (from Levski Sofia II)
—	FW	FRA	Gobé Gouano (from Pirin Blagoevgrad)

Out:

No.	Pos.	Nation	Player
12	GK	BUL	Ivaylo Nedelchev (to Arda)
18	DF	BUL	Petar Kepov (released)
21	MF	BUL	Simeon Ivanov (released)
26	MF	BUL	Kristiyan Valkov (to Etar)
99	GK	BUL	Denislav Zhekov (released)

=== Lokomotiv Gorna Oryahovitsa ===
In:

No.	Pos.	Nation	Player
—	MF	BUL	Toni Mihaylov (from Cherno More II)
—	MF	BUL	Kaloyan Todorov (from Vihren Sandanski)
—	FW	MLI	Zeidy Traore (free agent)
—	FW	BUL	Daniel Cabanelas (from Montana)
—	FW	BUL	Zhulian Ivanov (from Septemvri Sofia II)

Out:

No.	Pos.	Nation	Player
66	MF	FRA	Dylan Abe (to Fratria)
69	MF	BUL	Antonio Laskov (to Strumska Slava)

=== Ludogorets II ===
In:

No.	Pos.	Nation	Player
—	DF	BUL	Ilker Budinov (loan return from Arda)

Out:

No.	Pos.	Nation	Player
45	MF	BUL	Petar Karaangelov (to Etar)
81	MF	BUL	David Georgiev (to Chernolomets Popovo)
—	GK	BUL	Plamen Pepelyashev (to Dobrudzha, previously on loan at Nesebar)
—	DF	BUL	Ilker Budinov (to Hebar)

=== Marek ===
In:

No.	Pos.	Nation	Player
19	MF	BUL	Aleksandar Veselinski (from Cherno More)
99	MF	BUL	Dobromir Pancharevski (from Rilski Sportist)
—	DF	BUL	Deyan Kirilov (from CSKA 1948 II)
—	FW	BUL	Simeon Dimitrov (from CSKA 1948 II)

Out:

No.	Pos.	Nation	Player
5	DF	BUL	Mario Petkov (to CSKA 1948)
13	MF	BUL	Veselin Lyubomirov (to Vihren Sandanski)
19	FW	BUL	Aleksandar Asparuhov (to Strumska Slava)

=== Minyor ===
In:

No.	Pos.	Nation	Player
—	GK	BUL	Ivan Goshev (from Dunav Ruse)
—	DF	BUL	Georgi Madzharov (from Sportist Svoge)
—	MF	BUL	Mihail Chilikov (from Lokomotiv Sofia)

Out:

No.	Pos.	Nation	Player
1	GK	BUL	Daniel Leontiev (retired)
4	DF	BUL	Dimitar Avramov (to Botev Plovdiv II)
9	FW	BUL	Mario Georgiev (released)
27	MF	BUL	Vasil Vasilev (to Botev Ihtiman)

=== Montana ===
In:

No.	Pos.	Nation	Player
—	DF	BUL	Martin Mihaylov (from Hebar)
—	FW	BUL	Ivan Kokonov (from Etar)
—	FW	GUI	Ibrahima Berete (free agent])

Out:

No.	Pos.	Nation	Player
9	FW	NGA	Philip Ejike (on loan to (Belgium) Eupen)
13	MF	BUL	Iliya Rusinov (released)
16	FW	BUL	Daniel Cabanelas (released)
17	DF	BUL	Galin Minkov (to Fratria)

=== Nesebar ===
In:

No.	Pos.	Nation	Player
—	MF	BUL	Galin Dimov (from Sozopol)
—	MF	NED	Jonathan Rodrigues (free agent)
—	FW	BUL	Nikolay Drosev (from Septemvri Sofia)
—	FW	BUL	Aleksandar Petrov (from Lokomotiv Sofia)

Out:

No.	Pos.	Nation	Player
18	DF	BUL	Nuretin Pyuskyulyu (to Neftochimic)
20	DF	BUL	Nikola Gavov (to Rodopa Smolyan)
33	GK	BUL	Plamen Pepelyashev (loan return to Ludogorets II)
90	DF	BUL	Hristo Georgiev (on loan to Sozopol)

=== Pirin Blagoevgrad ===
In:

No.	Pos.	Nation	Player
—	FW	BUL	Mario Topuzov (from CSKA 1948)
—	FW	BUL	Nicholas Penev (from Lokomotiv Plovdiv)
—	FW	FRA	Noam Embarek (from (Belgium) RWD Molenbeek)

Out:

No.	Pos.	Nation	Player
9	FW	FRA	Gobé Gouano (end of contract)
16	MF	BUL	Nikola Bandev (on loan to Strumska Slava)
18	FW	CTA	Karl Namnganda (end of contract)
20	DF	BUL	Martin Georgiev (to Beroe)
21	GK	BUL	Yordan Dimitrov (on loan to Strumska Slava)

=== Spartak Pleven ===
In:

No.	Pos.	Nation	Player
—	GK	BUL	Iliyan Iliev (from Slavia Sofia II)
—	MF	FRA	Emmanuel Attah (from (Italy) Costa Orientale Sarda)

Out:

No.	Pos.	Nation	Player
2	DF	BUL	Konstantin Grahlyov (released)
7	MF	PLE	Monir Al Badarin (released)
20	DF	BUL	Toncho Georgiev (released)
30	GK	BUL	Dimitar Stefanov (to Partizan Cherven Bryag)

=== Sportist Svoge ===
In:

No.	Pos.	Nation	Player
—	GK	BUL	Petar Debarliev (from Hebar)
—	DF	BUL	Rafail Parlikov (from Belasitsa Petrich)
—	MF	BUL	Dimitar Zakonov (from Dunav Ruse)
—	MF	BUL	Martin Atanasov (from CSKA 1948 II)
—	MF	BRA	Jose Neto (on loan from Dobrudzha)
—	MF	VEN	Alejandro Gonçalves (from (Venezuela) Monagas)
—	FW	BUL	Evgeni Iliev (from Strumska Slava)
—	FW	BUL	Martin Toshev (from Yantra Gabrovo)
—	FW	BUL	Kristiyan Ivanov (from Akademik Svishtov)

Out:

No.	Pos.	Nation	Player
17	FW	BUL	Martin Krastev (to Botev Ihtiman)
20	DF	BUL	Georgi Madzharov (to Minyor Pernik)

=== Strumska Slava ===
In:

No.	Pos.	Nation	Player
6	MF	BUL	Nikola Bandev (on loan from Pirin Blagoevgrad)
7	MF	BUL	Antonio Laskov (from Lokomotiv Gorna Oryahovitsa)
10	FW	BUL	Aleksandar Asparuhov (from Marek)
12	GK	BUL	Yordan Dimitrov (on loan from Pirin Blagoevgrad)
18	DF	BUL	Petar Kepov (from Lovech)
33	DF	BUL	Pavel Todorov (from CSKA 1948 II)
77	FW	BUL	Dimitar Vladimirov (from Septemvri Simitli)
99	GK	BUL	Martin Stanchev (from Oborishte Panagyurishte)

Out:

No.	Pos.	Nation	Player
3	DF	BUL	Rumen Sandev (to Vihren Sandanski)
7	FW	BUL	Evgeni Iliev (released)
12	GK	BUL	Dragomir Petkov (released)
33	MF	BUL	Stelian Georgiev (released)
77	DF	BUL	Mario Dilchovski (released)
99	GK	BUL	Radoslav Rashkov (released)

=== Yantra ===
In:

No.	Pos.	Nation	Player
—	MF	BUL	Georgi Babaliev (from Etar)

Out:

No.	Pos.	Nation	Player
9	FW	BUL	Martin Toshev (to Sportist Svoge)
