= 2018–19 Bulgarian Cup =

Купа на България

Tournament details
- Country: Bulgaria
- Teams: 32

Final positions
- Champions: Lokomotiv Plovdiv (1st title)
- Runners-up: Botev Plovdiv

Tournament statistics
- Matches played: 33
- Goals scored: 90 (2.73 per match)
- Attendance: 74,230 (2,249 per match)
- Top goal scorer(s): (The Gambia) Ali Sowe (6 goals)
- All statistics correct as of 15 May 2019.

The 2018−19 Bulgarian Cup was the 37th official edition of the Bulgarian annual football knockout tournament. The competition began on 25 September 2018 with the first round and finished with the final on 15 May 2019. Slavia Sofia were the defending champions, but lost on penalties in the round of 16 to Ludogorets Razgrad. The final was contested between Lokomotiv Plovdiv and Botev Plovdiv, thus being the first final to feature the Plovdiv derby. Lokomotiv won the final with the score of 1–0 and clinched their first cup title. They also qualified for the second qualifying round of the 2019–20 UEFA Europa League.

== Participating clubs ==
The following 32 teams qualified for the competition:

2018–19 First League; 14 clubs	2018–19 Second League; 15 non-reserve clubs	Winners of 3 regional competitions 3 clubs
Beroe Stara Zagora; Botev Plovdiv; Botev Vratsa; CSKA Sofia; Cherno More Varna; Dunav Ruse; Etar Veliko Tarnovo; Levski Sofia; Lokomotiv Plovdiv; Ludogorets Razgrad; Septemvri Sofia; Slavia Sofia; Vereya Stara Zagora; Vitosha Bistritsa	Arda Kardzhali; Botev Galabovo; Chernomorets Balchik; CSKA 1948 Sofia; Dobrudzha Dobrich; Kariana Erden; Litex Lovech; Lokomotiv Gorna Oryahovitsa; Lokomotiv Sofia; Montana; Nesebar; Pirin Blagoevgrad; Pomorie; Strumska Slava Radomir; Tsarsko Selo Sofia	from Northern zone: Spartak Varna; from South-East zone: Atletik Kuklen; from South-West zone: Hebar Pazardzhik

== Matches ==
=== Round of 32 ===
The draw was conducted on 29 August 2018. The games will be played between 25 and 27 September 2018. In this stage all of the participants started their participation i.e. the 14 teams from First League, the 15 non-reserve teams from Second League and the 3 winners from the regional amateur competitions.

25 September 2018	Hebar Pazardzhik (III)	1–6	Beroe Stara Zagora	Pazardzhik
16:00 EEST	Mihaylov 78'	Report	Tsvetkov 3'; Alfredo 11', 17', 75'; Tsonev 54'; Firțulescu 67'	Stadium: Stadion Georgi Benkovski; Attendance: 610; Referee: Petar Grigorov (Sofia)

25 September 2018	Botev Galabovo (II)	0−0 (a.e.t.) (8–9 p)	Vitosha Bistritsa	Galabovo
16:00 EEST		Report		Stadium: Stadion Energetik; Attendance: 150; Referee: Blagoy Manov (Blagoevgrad)

25 September 2018	Pomorie (II)	0–1	Lokomotiv Plovdiv	Pomorie
16:00 EEST		Report	Taushanov 84' (o.g.)	Stadium: Stadion Pomorie; Attendance: 80; Referee: Valentin Zhelezov (Burgas)

25 September 2018	Kariana Erden (II)	0–1	Septemvri Sofia	Erden
16:00 EEST		Report	Budinov 80'	Stadium: Sporten kompleks Kariana; Attendance: 200; Referee: Dimitar Burov (Sofia)

25 September 2018	Dobrudzha Dobrich (II)	0–1	Lokomotiv Sofia (II)	Dobrich
16:00 EEST		Report	Krstevski 82'	Stadium: Stadion Druzhba; Attendance: 540; Referee: Dimitar Zhelyazkov (Silistra)

25 September 2018	Strumska Slava Radomir (II)	2–1	Tsarsko Selo Sofia (II)	Radomir
16:00 EEST	Zyumbulev 6'; Tasev 78'	Report	Kaloyanov 90+1'	Stadium: Gradski stadion Attendance: 400; Referee: Ivo Andreev (Sofia)

25 September 2018	Atletik Kuklen (III)	0–6	Levski Sofia	Plovdiv (Note: The match took place at the Stadion Lokomotiv in Plovdiv instead of Atletik Kuklen's home stadium.)
16:00 EEST		Report	Kabov 41'; Buș 44'; S. Ivanov 72', 76'; Gyuzlev 74' (o.g.); Nascimento 85'	Stadium: Stadion Lokomotiv; Attendance: 1,430; Referee: Stefan Pavlov (Burgas)

25 September 2018	Litex Lovech (II)	0–2	Etar Veliko Tarnovo	Lovech
17:00 EEST		Report	Petkov 8'; I. Stoyanov 40'	Stadium: Stadion Lovech; Attendance: 110; Referee: Petar Kirilov (Dobrich)

25 September 2018	Montana (II)	0–2	CSKA Sofia	Montana
19:00 EEST		Report	Evandro 52'; Sowe 90+2'	Stadium: Stadion Ogosta; Attendance: 3,370; Referee: Radoslav Gidzhenov (Plovdiv)

26 September 2018	Arda Kardzhali (II)	0−1	Cherno More Varna	Kardzhali
16:00 EEST		Report	Fennouche 51'	Stadium: Stadion Druzhba; Attendance: 2,300; Referee: Ryustem Karagaren (Asenovgrad)

26 September 2018	Nesebar (II)	1−3	Ludogorets Razgrad	Nesebar
16:00 EEST	Pyuskyulyu 25'	Report	Paulo 36'; Terziev 64'; Lukoki 87'	Stadium: Stadion Nesebar; Attendance: 300; Referee: Georgi Ginchev (Veliko Tarnovo)

26 September 2018	Lokomotiv Gorna Oryahovitsa (II)	1−1 (a.e.t.) (6–7 p)	Dunav Ruse	Gorna Oryahovitsa
17:00 EEST	Yurukov 46'	Report	Stanoev 41' (pen.)	Stadium: Stadion Lokomotiv; Attendance: 450; Referee: Nikola Petrov (Lovech)
	Penalties
	Kanev (penalty scored); Petev (penalty missed); K. Trifonov (penalty scored); T. Trifonov (penalty missed); Penev (penalty missed); M. Nikolov (penalty scored); Kitov (penalty scored); Chalakov (penalty missed); Kalchev (penalty missed); Yurukov (penalty scored); Siemonov (penalty scored); Kanev (penalty missed)		(penalty missed) Patev; (penalty missed) Stanoev; (penalty missed) Ahmedov; (penalty scored) Popadiyn; (penalty scored) Baldzhiyski; (penalty scored) N'Diaye; (penalty scored) Petrov; (penalty missed) Mensah; (penalty missed) Kovachev; (penalty scored) Ben Aicha; (penalty scored) Dimitrov; (penalty scored) Baldzhiyski

26 September 2018	Chernomorets Balchik (II)	1−0	Botev Vratsa	Balchik
18:00 EEST	Bankov 66' (o.g.)	Report		Stadium: Gradski stadion Attendance: 280; Referee: Ivelin Zanev (Ruse)

26 September 2018	CSKA 1948 Sofia (II)	1−4	Botev Plovdiv	Sofia (Note: The match took place at the Natsionalen stadion Vasil Levski in Sofia instead of CSKA 1948's home stadium.)
19:00 EEST	Gushterov 19'	Report	Yusein 4'; Baltanov 45', 67'; Petkov 69'	Stadium: Natsionalen stadion Vasil Levski; Attendance: 100; Referee: Georgi Nikolov (Sofia)

27 September 2018	Pirin Blagoevgrad (II)	0−2	Slavia Sofia	Blagoevgrad
19:00 EEST		Report	Chunchukov 30'; Yomov 59'	Stadium: Stadion Hristo Botev; Attendance: 460; Referee: Vangel Vangelov (Sofia)

27 September 2018	Spartak Varna (III)	1−1 (a.e.t.) (4−5 p)	Vereya Stara Zagora	Balchik (Note: The match took place at the Gradski stadion in Balchik instead of Spartak Varna's home stadium.)
19:00 EEST	Rusev 82'	Report	Vušurović 71'	Stadium: Gradski stadion Attendance: 520; Referee: Stanislav Stavrov (Veliko Tarnovo)
	Penalties
	Boev (penalty scored); Yovchev (penalty scored); Marinchev (penalty scored); Veselinov (penalty missed); Iliev (penalty missed); Rusev (penalty scored); Ivanov (penalty missed)		(penalty scored) Vušurović; (penalty scored) Iliev; (penalty missed) Ivanov; (penalty missed) Malek; (penalty scored) Kouroupis; (penalty scored) Vasilyev; (penalty scored) Alichkov

=== Round of 16 ===
The draw was conducted on 28 September 2018. The games will be played between 30 October and 1 November 2018. In this stage the participants will be the 16 winners from the first round.

30 October 2018	Strumska Slava Radomir (II)	3−1	Chernomorets Balchik (II)	Radomir
14:00 EET	Asparuhov 21', 82'; Yanev 22'	Report	Aleksandrov 67'	Stadium: Gradski stadion Attendance: 230; Referee: Georgi Nikolov (Sofia)

30 October 2018	Dunav Ruse	1−2	Lokomotiv Plovdiv	Ruse
17:30 EET	Aleksandrov 90+1'	Report	Aralica 64'; Karagaren 68'	Stadium: Gradski stadion Attendance: 650; Referee: Stanislav Todorov (Shumen)

30 October 2018	CSKA Sofia	3−1	Vitosha Bistritsa	Sofia
19:00 EET	Pinto 15'; Sowe 74', 76'	Report	Milchev 90+2'	Stadium: Balgarska Armiya; Attendance: 930; Referee: Petar Kirilov (Dobrich)

31 October 2018	Lokomotiv Sofia (II)	2−3	Septemvri Sofia	Sofia
14:00 EET	Vasev 1'; Petkov 67'	Report	Budinov 51' (pen.); Galchev 57' (pen.); S. Nikolov 83'	Stadium: Stadion Lokomotiv; Attendance: 300; Referee: Radoslav Gidzhenov (Plovdiv)

31 October 2018	Cherno More Varna	2−2 (a.e.t.) (5−4 p)	Levski Sofia	Varna
16:00 EET	Zehirov 12'; Bozhilov 90+1'	Report	Cabral 10'; Thiam 78'	Stadium: Stadion Ticha; Attendance: 3,900; Referee: Ivaylo Stoyanov (Petrich)
	Penalties
	G. Iliev (penalty scored); Bozhilov (penalty missed); Panayotov (penalty scored); Vasilev (penalty scored); Andrade (penalty scored); Dimov (penalty scored)		(penalty scored) Cabral; (penalty scored) Jablonský; (penalty scored) Cvetković; (penalty scored) Thiam; (penalty missed) Nascimento; (penalty missed) Reis

31 October 2018	Etar Veliko Tarnovo	3−0	Vereya Stara Zagora	Veliko Tarnovo
18:00 EET	Rumenov 51'; I. Stoyanov 82'; K. Stoyanov 86'	Report		Stadium: Stadion Ivaylo; Attendance: 600; Referee: Georgi Ivanov (Sofia)

31 October 2018	Ludogorets Razgrad	2−2 (a.e.t.) (4−3 p)	Slavia Sofia	Razgrad
19:00 EET	Świerczok 35', 74'	Report	G. Ivanov 14', 77'	Stadium: Ludogorets Arena; Attendance: 1,100; Referee: Nikola Popov (Sofia)
	Penalties
	Świerczok (penalty scored); Sasha (penalty missed); Lukoki (penalty scored); Campanharo (penalty scored); Keșerü (penalty scored)		(penalty scored) Shokolarov; (penalty scored) Uzunov; (penalty scored) G. Ivanov; (penalty missed) Gamakov; (penalty missed) Yomov

1 November 2018	Beroe Stara Zagora	0−0 (a.e.t.) (3−4 p)	Botev Plovdiv	Stara Zagora
19:00 EET		Report		Stadium: Stadion Beroe; Attendance: 4,000; Referee: Nikolay Yordanov (Sofia)
	Penalties
	Alfredo (penalty scored); Gadzhev (penalty scored); Angelov (penalty missed); Firțulescu (penalty scored); Raynov (penalty missed)		(penalty scored) Nedelev; (penalty missed) Petkov; (penalty scored) Pirgov; (penalty scored) Johnathan; (penalty scored) Yusein

=== Quarter-finals ===
The draw was conducted on 7 November 2018. The games will be played on 2, 3 and 4 April 2019. In this stage the participants will be the 8 winners from the second round.

2 April 2019	Etar Veliko Tarnovo	1−1 (a.e.t.) (6−7 p)	Lokomotiv Plovdiv	Veliko Tarnovo
18:30 EEST	I. Stoyanov 73' (pen.)	Report	Iliev 81'	Stadium: Stadion Ivaylo; Attendance: 3,300; Referee: Ivaylo Stoyanov (Petrich)
	Penalties
	Batrović (penalty scored); Sarmov (penalty scored); Artjunin (penalty scored); Angelov (penalty missed); I. Stoyanov (penalty missed); Rumenov (penalty scored); K. Stoyanov (penalty missed); Vasilev (penalty scored); Kolev (penalty scored); Galabov (penalty missed)		(penalty scored) Iliev; (penalty missed) Eliton; (penalty missed) Georgiev; (penalty scored) Karageren; (penalty scored) Ožbolt; (penalty scored) Tsvetanov; (penalty missed) Vezalov; (penalty scored) Bouhna; (penalty scored) Petrović; (penalty scored) Eze

3 April 2019	Ludogorets Razgrad	0−1	CSKA Sofia	Razgrad
18:30 EEST		Report	Pinto 30'	Stadium: Ludogorets Arena; Attendance: 5,800; Referee: Nikolay Yordanov (Sofia)

4 April 2019	Strumska Slava Radomir (II)	0−2	Septemvri Sofia	Radomir
16:00 EEST		Report	Tilev 44' (pen.); Rusev 85'	Stadium: Gradski stadion Attendance: 450; Referee: Vladimir Valkov (Plovdiv)

4 April 2019	Botev Plovdiv	1−1 (a.e.t.) (3−1 p)	Cherno More Varna	Plovdiv
18:30 EEST	Doré 52'	Report	Minchev 79'	Stadium: Futbolen kompleks Botev 1912; Attendance: 3,100; Referee: Stanislav Todorov (Shumen)
	Penalties
	Nedelev (penalty scored); Pirgov (penalty scored); Vutov (penalty scored)		(penalty scored) Andrade; (penalty missed) Dimov; (penalty missed) Panayotov; (penalty missed) Kiki

=== Semi-finals ===
The draw was conducted on 4 April 2019, immediately after the conclusion of the quarter-finals. The first legs will be played on 16 and 17 April, while the second legs are scheduled for 23 and 24 April 2019.

==== First legs ====
16 April 2019	Lokomotiv Plovdiv	4−0	Septemvri Sofia	Plovdiv
19:00 EEST	Iliev 14' (pen.); Eze 18'; Tsvetanov 28'; Banović 87'	Report		Stadium: Stadion Lokomotiv; Attendance: 1,600; Referee: Stanislav Todorov (Shumen)

17 April 2019	Botev Plovdiv	3−2	CSKA Sofia	Plovdiv
19:00 EEST	Nedelev 14' (pen.); Vutov 26'; Doré 84'	Report	Sowe 33' (pen.); Pinto 69'	Stadium: Futbolen kompleks Botev 1912; Attendance: 3,500; Referee: Nikolay Yordanov (Sofia)

==== Second legs ====
23 April 2019	Septemvri Sofia	0−0 (0−4 agg.)	Lokomotiv Plovdiv	Sofia
19:00 EEST		Report		Stadium: Natsionalen stadion Vasil Levski; Attendance: 270; Referee: Valentin Zhelezov (Burgas)

24 April 2019	CSKA Sofia	3−3 (5−6 agg.)	Botev Plovdiv	Sofia
19:00 EEST	Sowe 49', 85' (pen.); Evandro 74'	Report	Nedelev 22'; Baltanov 27'; Dimitrov 88'	Stadium: Stadion Balgarska Armiya; Attendance: 12,700; Referee: Petar Kirilov (Dobrich)

=== Final ===
The final took place at the Vasil Levski National Stadium in Sofia on May 15, 2019.

15 May 2019
19:00 EEST

Botev Plovdiv	0–1	Lokomotiv Plovdiv
	Report	Ožbolt 73'

Vasil Levski National Stadium, Sofia
Attendance: 20,500
Referee: Nikolay Yordanov (Sofia)

== Bracket ==
Round of 32
3	Hebar Pazardzhik	1
1	Beroe Stara Zagora	6
2	CSKA 1948 Sofia	1
1	Botev Plovdiv	4
2	Arda Kardzhali	0
1	Cherno More Varna	1
3	Atletik Kuklen	0
1	Levski Sofia	6
2	Nesebar	1
1	Ludogorets Razgrad	3
2	Pirin Blagoevgrad	0
1	Slavia Sofia	2
2	Montana	0
1	CSKA Sofia	2
2	Botev Galabovo	0 (8)
1	Vitosha Bistritsa (p)	0 (9)
2	Litex Lovech	0
1	Etar Veliko Tarnovo	2
3	Spartak Varna	1 (4)
1	Vereya Stara Zagora (p)	1 (5)
2	Lokomotiv Gorna Oryahovitsa	1 (6)
1	Dunav Ruse (p)	1 (7)
2	Pomorie	0
1	Lokomotiv Plovdiv	1
2	Strumska Slava Radomir	2
2	Tsarsko Selo Sofia	1
2	Chernomorets Balchik	1
1	Botev Vratsa	0
2	Dobrudzha Dobrich	0
2	Lokomotiv Sofia	1
2	Kariana Erden	0
1	Septemvri Sofia	1

Round of 16
1	Beroe Stara Zagora	0 (3)
1	Botev Plovdiv (p)	0 (4)
1	Cherno More Varna (p)	2 (5)
1	Levski Sofia	2 (4)
1	Ludogorets Razgrad (p)	2 (4)
1	Slavia Sofia	2 (3)
1	CSKA Sofia	3
1	Vitosha Bistritsa	1
1	Etar Veliko Tarnovo	3
1	Vereya Stara Zagora	0
1	Dunav Ruse	1
1	Lokomotiv Plovdiv	2
2	Strumska Slava Radomir	3
2	Chernomorets Balchik	1
2	Lokomotiv Sofia	2
1	Septemvri Sofia	3

Quarter-finals
1	Botev Plovdiv (p)	1 (3)
1	Cherno More Varna	1 (1)
1	Ludogorets Razgrad	0
1	CSKA Sofia	1
1	Etar Veliko Tarnovo	1 (6)
1	Lokomotiv Plovdiv (p)	1 (7)
2	Strumska Slava Radomir	0
1	Septemvri Sofia	2

Semi-finals
1	Botev Plovdiv	3	3
1	CSKA Sofia	2	3
1	Lokomotiv Plovdiv	4	0
1	Septemvri Sofia	0	0

Final
1	Botev Plovdiv	0
1	Lokomotiv Plovdiv	1

== Top goalscorers ==
As of 15 May 2019

Rank	Player	Club	Goals
1	(The Gambia) Ali Sowe	CSKA Sofia	6
2	(Brazil) Alfredo	Beroe	3
2	(Bulgaria) Lachezar Baltanov	Botev Plovdiv	3
2	(Portugal) Rúben Pinto	CSKA Sofia	3
2	(Bulgaria) Ivan Stoyanov	Etar	3
6	eight players		2
