= Martin Velichkov =

Bulgarian footballer (born 1999)

Personal information
- Full name: Martin Miroslavov Velichkov
- Date of birth: 19 September 1999 (age 27)
- Place of birth: Kostinbrod, Bulgaria
- Height: 1.93 m (6 ft 4 in)
- Position: Goalkeeper

Team information
- Current team: Lokomotiv Sofia
- Number: 99

Youth career
- OFC Kostinbrod
- Slavia Sofia

Senior career*
Years	Team	Apps	(Gls)
2017–2018	Slavia Sofia	0	(0)
2017–2018	→ Strumska Slava (loan)	1	(0)
2018–2019	FC Pesch	18	(0)
2019–2021	Fortuna Köln II	8	(0)
2019–2021	Fortuna Köln	4	(0)
2021–2022	Rot Weiss Ahlen	15	(0)
2022–2023	Sportist Svoge	13	(0)
2023–2024	Etar	28	(0)
2024–2025	Spartak Varna	32	(0)
2025–	Lokomotiv Sofia	28	(0)

International career^{‡}
2026–	Bulgaria	2	(0)
- * Club domestic league appearances and goals as of 11 June 2026 ‡ National team caps and goals as of 20:59, 5 June 2026 (UTC)

Martin Velichkov (Bulgarian: Мартин Величков; born 19 September 1999) is a Bulgarian professional footballer who plays as a goalkeeper for Lokomotiv Sofia and the Bulgaria national team.

== Career ==
Martin started his career in Slavia Sofia with being on loan to Strumska Slava. In 2018 he moved to Germany to join FC Pesch, then moved to Fortuna Köln and spend a year in Rot Weiss Ahlen, before returning in Bulgaria and joining Sportist Svoge in 2022. His good plays in Second League, secured him a transfer to Etar and he joined the team on 8 June 2023. On 20 December he was awarded as the best Bulgarian goalkeeper in First League for the mid season.

== International career ==
On 16 March 2026 Velichkov was called up for the first time for the Bulgaria's men's national team. On 27 March 2026 he debuted for the senior national team in a 10–2 win against the Solomon Islands in the FIFA Series, coming on at half time. On 5 June 2026, Velichkov had his maiden appearance as a starter, playing the first half of the 2:2 away draw with Moldova in a friendly match.

== Career statistics ==
=== International ===
As of match played 5 June 2026

Appearances and goals by national team and year
National team	Year	Apps	Goals
Bulgaria
Bulgaria	2026	2	0
Total		2	0
