= Borislav Nikolov =

Bulgarian footballer

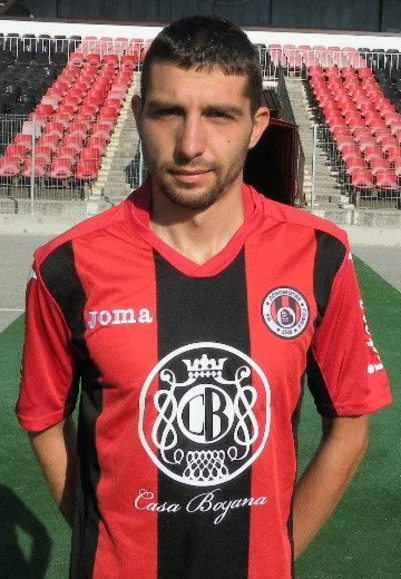

Personal information
- Full name: Borislav Rumenov Nikolov
- Date of birth: 3 February 1992 (age 34)
- Place of birth: Radomir, Bulgaria
- Height: 1.72 m (5 ft 8 in)
- Positions: Right back; midfielder

Team information
- Current team: Strumska Slava
- Number: 2

Senior career*
Years	Team	Apps	(Gls)
2010–2012	CSKA Sofia	1	(0)
2011–2012	→ Akademik Sofia (loan)	21	(2)
2012–2015	Marek Dupnitsa	77	(9)
2015–2016	Strumska Slava	9	(5)
2016–2017	Lokomotiv Sofia	2	(0)
2017–2025	Strumska Slava	242	(60)
2025	Marek Dupnitsa	18	(2)
2026	Minyor Pernik	13	(1)
2026–	Strumska Slava	12	(5)
- * Club domestic league appearances and goals as of 1 November 2026

Borislav Rumenov Nikolov (Bulgarian: Борислав Руменов Николов; born 3 February 1992) is a Bulgarian footballer who currently plays as a defender and midfielder for Strumska Slava Radomir.

== Career ==
Nikolov began his club career with CSKA Sofia, but made only one appearance for the senior squad. He played 56 minutes in a 2–0 away league loss against Chernomorets Burgas on 16 May 2010.

In June 2011, Nikolov was loaned out to Akademik Sofia.

In July 2025 he left Strumska Slava after 8 years with the club and over 247 matches overall to return to Marek Dupnitsa.
