= Ivan Arsov =

Bulgarian association football player

Personal information
- Full name: Ivan Georgiev Arsov
- Date of birth: 26 September 2000 (age 26)
- Place of birth: Sofia, Bulgaria
- Height: 1.97 m (6 ft 6 in)
- Position: Defender

Team information
- Current team: Vihren Sandanski
- Number: 5

Youth career
- –2017: Botev Plovdiv
- 2017–2019: Septemvri Sofia

Senior career*
Years	Team	Apps	(Gls)
2018–2024	Septemvri Sofia	98	(4)
2019–2020	→ Pirin Razlog (loan)	15	(1)
2024–2025	Marek Dupnitsa	32	(2)
2025–	Vihren Sandanski	29	(0)

International career
2017–2019	Bulgaria U19	2	(0)
- * Club domestic league appearances and goals as of 11 June 2026

Ivan Arsov (Bulgarian: Иван Арсов; born 26 September 2000) is a Bulgarian professional footballer who plays as a defender for Vihren Sandanski.

== Career ==
=== Septemvri Sofia ===
On 24 November 2018 Arsov made his professional debut for the team in a league match against Cherno More Varna.

== Career statistics ==
=== Club ===
As of 25 November 2018

Club performance			League		Cup		Continental		Other		Total	
Club	League	Season	Apps	Goals	Apps	Goals	Apps	Goals	Apps	Goals	Apps	Goals
Bulgaria			League		Bulgarian Cup		Europe		Other		Total	
Septemvri Sofia	First League	2018–19	1	0	0	0	–		–		1	0
Septemvri Sofia	Total		1	0	0	0	0	0	0	0	1	0
Career statistics			1	0	0	0	0	0	0	0	1	0
