= Martin Dichev =

Bulgarian footballer

Personal information
- Full name: Martin Danailov Dichev
- Date of birth: 22 August 2000 (age 26)
- Place of birth: Varna, Bulgaria
- Height: 1.62 m (5 ft 4 in)
- Position: Left-back

Team information
- Current team: Pirin Blagoevgrad (on loan from Botev Vratsa)
- Number: 12

Youth career
- 2010–2019: Cherno More

Senior career*
Years	Team	Apps	(Gls)
2018–2019	Cherno More	0	(0)
2019–2020	Dobrudzha	14	(2)
2020–2024	Cherno More	54	(0)
2024–	Botev Vratsa	35	(0)
2026–	→ Pirin Blagoevgrad (loan)	14	(0)

International career^{‡}
2018	Bulgaria U19	3	(0)
2021–2022	Bulgaria U21	8	(0)
- * Club domestic league appearances and goals as of 11 June 2026 ‡ National team caps and goals as of 21:31, 25 March 2022 (UTC)

Martin Dichev (Bulgarian: Мартин Дичев; born 22 August 2000) is a Bulgarian professional footballer who plays as a left-back for Pirin Blagoevgrad on loan from Botev Vratsa.

== Career ==
Dichev began his career with Cherno More at the age of eight and progressed through the club's academy.

In May 2020, Dichev returned to Cherno More, signing first professional contract in his career. He made his first team debut for the club in a 4–0 away win against Etar on 16 August 2020, coming on as a substitute for Viktor Popov.

== Career statistics ==
=== Club ===
As of 31 October 2021

Club	League	Season	League		Cup		Continental		Total	
Club	League	Season	Apps	Goals	Apps	Goals	Apps	Goals	Apps	Goals
Cherno More	First League	2018–19	0	0	0	0	—		0	0
Dobrudzha	Third League	2019–20	14	2	2	0	—		16	2
Cherno More	First League	2020–21	13	0	2	0	—		15	0
Cherno More	First League	2021–22	9	0	2	0	—		11	0
Career statistics			36	2	6	0	0	0	42	2
