= Alfredo (footballer, born 1992) =

Brazilian footballer

Personal information
- Full name: Alfredo Francisco Martins
- Date of birth: 6 July 1992 (age 34)
- Place of birth: Americana, Brazil
- Height: 1.76 m (5 ft 9 in)
- Position: Forward

Team information
- Current team: Juventus

Youth career
- 2007–2012: São Paulo

Senior career*
Years	Team	Apps	(Gls)
2010–2014	São Paulo	0	(0)
2013	→ Paulista (loan)	7	(1)
2014–2015	→ América-RN (loan)	33	(7)
2015–2017	Portimonense	1	(0)
2016	→ Luverdense (loan)	24	(7)
2017	→ Paysandu (loan)	0	(0)
2017	Luverdense	17	(2)
2018	Uberlândia	7	(0)
2018–2019	Beroe	16	(0)
2019–2020	Penafiel	6	(0)
2020	Penapolense	3	(1)
2020–2021	Barra		
2021–	Juventus	10	(1)
- * Club domestic league appearances and goals as of 21 September 2021

Alfredo Francisco Martins (born 6 July 1992), known as Alfredo is a Brazilian footballer who plays as a forward for Juventus.

== Club career ==
Born in Americana, São Paulo, Alfredo started his youth career with the academy of local club São Paulo FC. He went on to score 184 goals for the reserve team and also became the top scorer of 2013 Paulista under-20. He spent the 2013 season on loan at Paulista Futebol Clube. On 17 December 2013, he signed for second tier América Futebol Clube (RN). He scored twice in a 5–2 victory over Fluminense FC in Copa do Brasil.

In July 2016, Alfredo joined Portuguese club Portimonense. Soon, he was loaned out to Luverdense Esporte Clube in his native country. In the Campeonato Mato-Grossense, he scored 13 goals in 17 matches with his team winning the championship. He also became the top scorer of the tournament. On 2 January 2017, he joined fellow league club Paysandu Sport Club on a loan deal.

After another stint with Luverdense, Alfredo signed with Uberlândia Esporte Clube for the 2018 Campeonato Mineiro on 29 December 2017. On 11 June 2018, he moved to Bulgarian club PFC Beroe Stara Zagora.

== Career statistics ==
As of match played on 17 February 2019

Club	Season	League			Cup		Other		Total	
Club	Season	Division	Apps	Goals	Apps	Goals	Apps	Goals	Apps	Goals
São Paulo	2010	Série A	0	0	0	0	—		0	0
São Paulo	2011	Série A	0	0	0	0	—		0	0
São Paulo	2012	Série A	0	0	0	0	—		0	0
São Paulo	Total		0	0	0	0	—		0	0
Paulista (loan)	2013	Paulista A1	7	1	11	1	—		18	2
América-RN	2014	Série B	13	0	8	5	5 (Note: Appearances in Campeonato Potiguar)	1	26	6
América-RN	2015	Série B	0	0	2	0	8	3	10	3
América-RN	Total		13	0	10	5	13	4	36	9
Portimonense	2015–16	Segunda Liga	1	0	2	0	—		3	0
Luverdense (loan)	2016	Série B	24	7	2	0	17 (Note: Appearances in Campeonato Mato-Grossense)	13	43	20
Paysandu (loan)	2017	Série B	0	0	8	1	—		8	1
Luverdense	2017	Série B	17	2	0	0			17	2
Uberlândia	2018	Série D	0	0	1	0	7 (Note: Appearances in Campeonato Mineiro)	0	8	0
Beroe	2018–19	First League	15	0	2	3	—		17	3
Career total			77	10	36	10	37	17	150	37
