= Plamen Pepelyashev =

Bulgarian footballer (born 2003)

Personal information
- Full name: Plamen Georgiev Pepelyashev
- Date of birth: 12 November 2003 (age 22)
- Place of birth: Burgas, Bulgaria
- Height: 1.93 m (6 ft 4 in)
- Position: Goalkeeper

Team information
- Current team: Dunav Ruse
- Number: 69

Youth career
- PSFC Chernomorets
- –2018: Chernomorets Burgas
- 2018–2023: Ludogorets Razgrad

Senior career*
| Years | Team | Apps | (Gls) |
| 2020–2023 | Ludogorets Razgrad III | 24 | (0) |
| 2023–2024 | Ludogorets Razgrad II | 20 | (0) |
| 2024 | Ludogorets Razgrad | 1 | (0) |
| 2024 | → Nesebar (loan) | 20 | (0) |
| 2025–2026 | Dobrudzha | 3 | (0) |
| 2026– | Dunav Ruse | 2 | (0) |
- * Club domestic league appearances and goals as of 18:17, 17 September 2026 (UTC) ‡ National team caps and goals as of 08:26, 22 November 2023 (UTC)

Plamen Pepelyashev (Bulgarian: Пламен Пепеляшев; born 12 November 2003) is a Bulgarian professional footballer who plays as a goalkeeper for First League club Dunav Ruse

== Career ==
Born in Burgas, Pepelyashev started his career in the local Chernomorets Academies, before joining Ludogorets in 2018, at the age of 15. In 2024, after main goalkeepers of Ludogorets got injuries, he was selected as second goalkeeper in the 2024 Bulgarian Cup final against Botev Plovdiv. In 45th minute, the titular keeper Damyan Hristov got an injury which lead to Pepelyashev debut. He received one goal and made few saves, but Ludogorets lost the final with 3:2 result. Few days later he completed his league debut in the last match for the season, against Cherno More.

On 17 July 2024 he was sent on loan to the Second League team Nesebar on a season long deal. In December 2024 he returned to Ludogorets and later it was revealed that he is leaving the club. In January 2025 he signed with Dobrudzha Dobrich.

== Career statistics ==
As of match played 26 August 2024

Appearances and goals by club, season and competition
| Club | Season | League | | | National cup | | Europe | | Other | | Total | |
| Club | Season | Division | Apps | Goals | Apps | Goals | Apps | Goals | Apps | Goals | Apps | Goals |
|---|---|---|---|---|---|---|---|---|---|---|---|---|
| Ludogorets Razgrad II | 2022–23 | Second League | 5 | 0 | — | | — | | — | | 5 | 0 |
| Ludogorets Razgrad II | 2023–24 | Second League | 15 | 0 | — | | — | | — | | 15 | 0 |
| Ludogorets Razgrad II | Total | | 20 | 0 | — | | — | | — | | 20 | 0 |
| Ludogorets Razgrad | 2023–24 | First League | 1 | 0 | 1 | 0 | 0 | 0 | 0 | 0 | 2 | 0 |
| Ludogorets Razgrad | Total | | 1 | 0 | 1 | 0 | 0 | 0 | 0 | 0 | 2 | 0 |
| Nesebar (loan) | 2024–25 | Second League | 6 | 0 | 0 | 0 | — | | — | | 6 | 0 |
| Career total | | | 27 | 0 | 1 | 0 | 0 | 0 | 0 | 0 | 28 | 0 |
