= Valentin Nikolov (footballer) =

Bulgarian football player (born 2003)

Personal information
- Full name: Valentin Valentinov Nikolov
- Date of birth: 15 October 2003 (age 23)
- Place of birth: Sofia, Bulgaria
- Height: 1.82 m (6 ft 0 in)
- Position: Midfielder

Team information
- Current team: Makedonikos
- Number: 90

Youth career
- Lokomotiv Sofia

Senior career*
Years	Team	Apps	(Gls)
2017–2024	Lokomotiv Sofia	112	(6)
2023	→ Minyor Pernik (loan)	11	(0)
2025	Septemvri Sofia	5	(0)
2025–	Makedonikos	0	(0)

International career^{‡}
2019–2021	Bulgaria U17	3	(0)
2020–2021	Bulgaria U19	9	(1)
2022–2023	Bulgaria U21	5	(0)
- * Club domestic league appearances and goals as of 26 June 2025 ‡ National team caps and goals as of 08:00, 3 October 2023 (UTC)

Valentin Nikolov (Bulgarian: Валентин Николов; born 15 October 2003) is a Bulgarian professional footballer who plays as a midfielder for Greek Super League 2 club Makedonikos.

== Career ==
Nikolov joined Lokomotiv Sofia academy at young age. He become the youngest debutant for the team, making his league debut on 27 October 2018 at the age of just 15 years and 12 days. In January 2023 he was loaned to Minyor Pernik until the end of season.

== Career statistics ==
=== Club ===
As of 18 March 2024

Appearances and goals by club, season and competition
Club	Season	League			Bulgarian Cup		Continental		Other (Note: Includes Bulgarian Supercup)		Total	
Club	Season	Division	Apps	Goals	Apps	Goals	Apps	Goals	Apps	Goals	Apps	Goals
Lokomotiv Sofia	2018–19	Second League	7	0	0	0	–		–		7	0
Lokomotiv Sofia	2019–20	Second League	9	1	0	0	–		–		9	1
Lokomotiv Sofia	2020–21	Second League	22	3	0	0	–		–		22	3
Lokomotiv Sofia	2021–22	First League	26	1	1	0	–		–		27	1
Lokomotiv Sofia	2022–23	First League	8	0	0	0	–		–		8	0
Lokomotiv Sofia	2023–24	First League	24	0	0	0	–		–		24	0
Lokomotiv Sofia	Total		96	5	1	0	0	0	0	0	97	5
Minyor Pernik (loan)	2022–23	Second League	11	0	0	0	–		–		11	0
Career total			107	5	1	0	0	0	0	0	108	5
