= Dragomir Petkov =

Bulgarian footballer

Personal information
- Full name: Dragomir Krasimirov Petkov
- Date of birth: 8 June 1998 (age 28)
- Place of birth: Silistra, Bulgaria
- Height: 1.84 m (6 ft 1/2 in)
- Position: Goalkeeper

Team information
- Current team: Rilski Sportist
- Number: 12

Youth career
- Levski Sofia; Lokomotiv Sofia

Senior career*
Years	Team	Apps	(Gls)
2016–2017	Lokomotiv Sofia	0	(0)
2017–2018	Bdin Vidin	16	(0)
2018–2019	CSKA 1948	3	(0)
2018–2019	→ Strumska Slava (loan)	14	(0)
2019–2025	Strumska Slava	159	(0)
2025	Lokomotiv Sofia	1	(0)
2025	Hebar Pazardzhik	0	(0)
2025–	Rilski Sportist	30	(0)
- * Club domestic league appearances and goals as of 2 August 2026

Dragomir Petkov (Bulgarian: Драгомир Петков; born 8 June 1998) is a Bulgarian professional footballer who plays as a goalkeeper for Rilski Sportist Samokov.

== Career ==
Petkov began his footballing career in the youth systems of Levski Sofia and Lokomotiv Sofia. He progressed through the ranks before turning professional with Lokomotiv Sofia. However, he did not make any senior appearances for the club who competed in Vtora liga at the time.

In 2017, Petkov joined Bdin Vidin for the winter and his good form earned him a move to CSKA 1948 in January 2018, where he failed to record any official appearances for the first team.

During the 2018–19 season, Petkov was loaned to Strumska Slava, where he made 14 appearances for the Radomir team. His performances on loan earned him a permanent transfer to Strumska Slava in 2019. Over the next six seasons, Petkov established himself as a first-choice goalkeeper for the club, making 159 league appearances between 2019 and 2025. His consistent displays and reliability in goal contributed significantly to the team's performances during this period.

In 2025, Petkov returned to Lokomotiv Sofia, signing with the club for a second time until the summer of 2026.

== Personal life ==
Petkov has a YouTube channel with more than 10k subscribers.
