= Danylo Polonskyi =

Ukrainian footballer

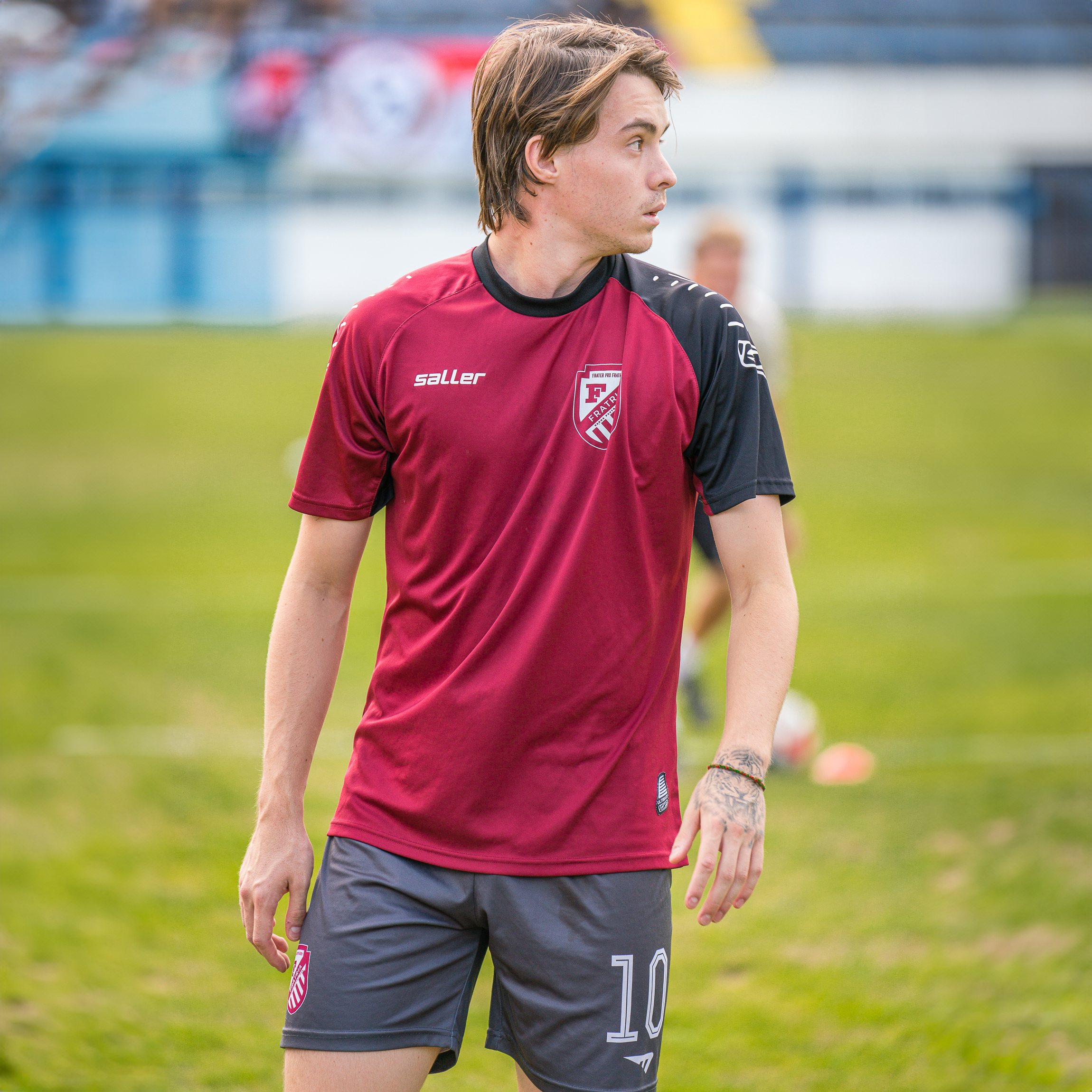
- Polonskyi warming up for Fratria in 2023.

Personal information
- Full name: Danylo Hennadiyovych Polonskyi
- Date of birth: 14 November 2001 (age 24)
- Place of birth: Dnipropetrovsk, Ukraine
- Height: 1.85 m (6 ft 1 in)
- Position: Attacking midfielder

Team information
- Current team: FC Van
- Number: 91

Youth career
- 2013–2015: DYuSSh-12 Dnipropetrovsk
- 2015–2017: Inter Dnipro
- 2017–2019: Dnipro-1

Senior career*
Years	Team	Apps	(Gls)
2017–2018	Dnipro-1-Borysfen	32	(13)
2019–2021	Dnipro-1	0	(0)
2021–2022	Kryvbas Kryvyi Rih	3	(0)
2022–2024	Fratria	20	(15)
2024	Pirin Blagoevgrad	15	(1)
2024–2025	Lokomotiv Plovdiv	10	(0)
2025–2026	Botev Vratsa	9	(0)
2026–	FC Van	2	(0)
- * Club domestic league appearances and goals as of 13 October 2026

Danylo Hennadiyovych Polonskyi (Ukrainian: Данило Геннадійович Полонський; born 14 November 2001) is a Ukrainian professional footballer who plays as an attacking midfielder for Armenian Premier League club FC Van.

== Career ==
Danylo was born in Dnipropetrovsk. He started his youth career in DYuSSh-12 and in 2015 he moved to Inter Dnipro, before joining Dnipro-1 in 2017. In adult football, he made his debut in 2018 in the team Dnipro-1 reserves, Dnipro-1-Borysfen, which played in the Ukrainian Amateur Championship. At the beginning of August 2019, he was called for the first team. On December 6, 2020, he was called up for the league match against Zorya Luhansk, but spent all 90 minutes on the bench. At the beginning of January 2021, Polonsyi left Dnipro-1 as a free agent.

On 6 September 2021 he signed a contract with Kryvbas Kryvyi Rih. Danylo completed his professional debut on 16 October 2021 in a league match against FC Kramatorsk. He came on as a substitute in the 84th minute on Oleksandr Horvat place.

In the summer of 2022 he moved to Turkey after the Russian invasion of Ukraine and trained few months with Yeni Malatyaspor, before joining the amateur team of Fratria from Bulgaria, in the end of the year. He became an important part of the team, that won a promotion in Third League in 2023. In the mid-season he was one of the leading goalscorers of the team. In January 2024 he joined First League team of Pirin Blagoevgrad on trials. Week later Fratria announced he will leave the club. On 2 February 2024 he officially signed with Pirin. He made his official debut for the club on 18 February 2024, in a league match against Levski Sofia.

On 24 June 2024, he was officially announced as a new signing of Lokomotiv Plovdiv. He left the team in February 2025. On 12 September 2025 he made his debut for Botev Vratsa, marking his joining the team without an official statement from the team.

== Career statistics ==
As of 24 June 2024

Club	Season	League			National Cup		Continental		Other		Total	
Club	Season	Division	Apps	Goals	Apps	Goals	Apps	Goals	Apps	Goals	Apps	Goals
Dnipro-1-Borysfen	2017–18	Ukrainian Amateur Championship	32	13	0	0	—		—		32	13
Dnipro-1	2019–20	Ukrainian Premier League	0	0	0	0	—		—		0	0
Dnipro-1	2020–21	Ukrainian Premier League	0	0	0	0	—		—		0	0
Dnipro-1	Total		0	0	0	0	—		—		0	0
Kryvbas Kryvyi Rih	2021–22	Ukrainian First League	3	0	0	0	—		—		3	0
Fratria	2022–23	A Regional Varna	9	9	0	0	—		—		9	9
Fratria	2023–24	Third League	11	6	0	0	—		—		11	6
Fratria	Total		20	15	0	0	—		—		20	15
Pirin Blagoevgrad	2023–24	First League	15	1	1	0	—		—		16	1
Career total			78	29	1	0	0	0	—		79	29
