= Kristiyan Kitov =

Bulgarian footballer

Personal information
- Full name: Kristiyan Dimitrov Kitov
- Date of birth: 14 October 1996 (age 30)
- Place of birth: Sofia, Bulgaria
- Height: 1.79 m (5 ft 10 in)
- Position: Midfielder

Youth career
- –2012: CSKA Sofia
- 2012–2015: Ludogorets Razgrad

Senior career*
| Years | Team | Apps | (Gls) |
| 2013–2018 | Ludogorets Razgrad | 4 | (1) |
| 2015–2018 | Ludogorets Razgrad II | 31 | (0) |
| 2018 | Lokomotiv GO | 12 | (2) |
| 2019–2024 | Strumska Slava | 104 | (5) |
| Total | | 151 | (8) |
- * Club domestic league appearances and goals

Kristiyan Kitov (Bulgarian: Кристиян Китов; born 14 October 1996) is a Bulgarian former professional footballer who played as a midfielder. He is the youngest goalscorer for Ludogorets Razgrad.

== Career ==
Born in Sofia, Kitov began his football career from CSKA Sofia, before moving to Ludogorets Razgrad. He was the captain of the U19 team who took a part of 2014–15 season of UEFA Youth League.

Kitov become the youngest player to debut for the first team, coming in play at 16 years 11 months 25 days in match against Dunav Ruse in the Bulgarian Cup. He completed his professional debut in A Group on 18 May 2014 scoring a goal for the 3:1 win over Cherno More, becoming the youngest goalscorer for Ludogorets at age 17 years 7 months 4 days. For the 2015–16 season Kitov was part of the newly created second team of Ludogorets in B Group playing not very often due to injuries. Three years later, on 28 May 2017, he returned in the first team and played for the First League again against Cherno More and the team won with the same result.

Kitov started the 2017–18 season in Ludogorets II playing in the first match of the season against Lokomotiv 1929 Sofia.

On 30 May 2018, Kitov ended his contract with Ludogorets due to mutual agreement, because he could not find a place in the first team and the team did not want to stop his development.

On 7 July 2018, Kitov signed a contract with the Bulgarian Second League team Lokomotiv GO.

On 15 February 2024, after five seasons with Strumska Slava, Kitov announced his retirement at the age of just 27, as he had torn a posterior cruciate ligament, which was another heavy injury for him.

== Career statistics ==
As of 29 November 2018

Appearances and goals by club, season and competition
| Club | Season | League | | | Bulgarian Cup | | Continental | | Other (Note: Includes Bulgarian Supercup.) | | Total | |
| Club | Season | Division | Apps | Goals | Apps | Goals | Apps | Goals | Apps | Goals | Apps | Goals |
|---|---|---|---|---|---|---|---|---|---|---|---|---|
| Ludogorets Razgrad | 2013–14 | A Group | 1 | 1 | 2 | 0 | 0 | 0 | 0 | 0 | 3 | 1 |
| Ludogorets Razgrad | 2014–15 | A Group | 0 | 0 | 0 | 0 | 0 | 0 | 0 | 0 | 0 | 0 |
| Ludogorets Razgrad | 2015–16 | A Group | 0 | 0 | 0 | 0 | 0 | 0 | 0 | 0 | 0 | 0 |
| Ludogorets Razgrad | 2016–17 | First League | 2 | 0 | 0 | 0 | 0 | 0 | — | | 2 | 0 |
| Ludogorets Razgrad | 2017–18 | First League | 1 | 0 | 0 | 0 | 0 | 0 | — | | 1 | 0 |
| Ludogorets Razgrad | Total | | 4 | 1 | 2 | 0 | 0 | 0 | 0 | 0 | 6 | 1 |
| Ludogorets Razgrad II | 2015–16 | B Group | 7 | 0 | — | | — | | — | | 7 | 0 |
| Ludogorets Razgrad II | 2016–17 | Second League | 3 | 0 | — | | — | | — | | 3 | 0 |
| Ludogorets Razgrad II | 2017–18 | Second League | 21 | 0 | — | | — | | — | | 21 | 0 |
| Ludogorets Razgrad II | Total | | 31 | 0 | 0 | 0 | 0 | 0 | 0 | 0 | 31 | 0 |
| Lokomotiv Gorna Oryahovitsa | 2018–19 | Second League | 12 | 2 | 1 | 0 | — | | — | | 13 | 2 |
| Career total | | | 47 | 3 | 3 | 0 | 0 | 0 | 0 | 0 | 50 | 3 |

== Honours ==
Ludogorets Razgrad

- Bulgarian A Group: 2013–14
- Bulgarian Cup: 2013–14
