= Georgi Yanev =

Bulgarian footballer

Personal information
- Full name: Georgi Angelov Yanev
- Date of birth: 4 January 1998 (age 28)
- Place of birth: Sofia, Bulgaria
- Height: 1.76 m (5 ft 9 1/2 in)
- Position: Midfielder

Team information
- Current team: Strumska Slava
- Number: 8

Youth career
- 2005–2007: Septemvri Sofia
- 2007–: Levski Sofia

Senior career*
Years	Team	Apps	(Gls)
2015–2018	Levski Sofia	1	(0)
2017	→ Spartak Pleven (loan)	10	(0)
2017	→ Strumska Slava (loan)	10	(0)
2018	→ Botev Vratsa (loan)	0	(0)
2018–2019	Strumska Slava	26	(1)
2019–2020	Lokomotiv GO	12	(1)
2020	Sportist Svoge	11	(0)
2021–	Strumska Slava	98	(6)

International career
2014–2015	Bulgaria U17	2	(0)
2016–2017	Bulgaria U19	11	(0)
- * Club domestic league appearances and goals as of 25 June 2024

Georgi Angelov Yanev (Bulgarian: Георги Ангелов Янев; born 4 January 1998) is a Bulgarian footballer who currently plays as a midfielder for Bulgarian Second League club Strumska Slava.

== Career ==
After initially joining the academy system at Septemvri Sofia Yanev moved to the Levski Sofia academy at the age of 9.

On 1 August 2015, Yanev made his first senior appearance for Levski, replacing Jeremy de Nooijer for the last four minutes as Levski lost 0–2 at away against Ludogorets Razgrad in the A Group.

In January 2017, Yanev was loaned to Second League club Spartak Pleven until the end of the season.

On 24 August 2017, Yanev was sent on a season-long loan to newly promoted to Second League Strumska Slava Radomir.

== International career ==
=== Youth levels ===
Yanev was called up for the Bulgaria U19 team for the 2017 European Under-19 Championship qualification from 22 to 27 March 2017. After a draw and 2 wins the team qualified for the knockout phase which will be held in July 2017.

== Statistics ==
As of 1 August 2015

Club performance			League		Cup		Continental		Other		Total	
Club	League	Season	Apps	Goals	Apps	Goals	Apps	Goals	Apps	Goals	Apps	Goals
Bulgaria			League		Bulgarian Cup		Europe		Other (Note: Includes Bulgarian Supercup matches.)		Total	
Levski Sofia	A Group	2015–16	1	0	0	0	–		–		1	0
Levski Sofia	Total		1	0	0	0	0	0	0	0	1	0
Career statistics			1	0	0	0	0	0	0	0	1	0
