= Oleksandr Horvat =

Ukrainian footballer

Personal information
- Full name: Oleksandr Vasylyovych Horvat
- Date of birth: 17 June 1995 (age 31)
- Place of birth: Kryvyi Rih, Ukraine
- Height: 1.76 m (5 ft 9 in)
- Position: Left-back

Team information
- Current team: Unia Solec Kujawski
- Number: 16

Youth career
- 2006–2010: Kryvbas-84 Kryvyi Rih
- 2010–2012: Dnipro Dnipropetrovsk

Senior career*
| Years | Team | Apps | (Gls) |
| 2013 | Litsey Kazanka | 0 | (0) |
| 2013–2015 | Hirnyk Kryvyi Rih | 27 | (1) |
| 2015 | → Inhulets Petrove (loan) | 5 | (0) |
| 2015 | Inhulets Petrove | 0 | (0) |
| 2016 | Barsa Sumy | 6 | (0) |
| 2016–2018 | Kremin Kremenchuk | 55 | (1) |
| 2018–2020 | Mykolaiv | 33 | (0) |
| 2018–2019 | → Mykolaiv-2 | 6 | (0) |
| 2020 | Hirnyk Kryvyi Rih | 0 | (0) |
| 2020–2022 | Kryvbas Kryvyi Rih | 25 | (5) |
| 2022 | → Unia Solec Kujawski (loan) | 16 | (4) |
| 2022–2024 | Unia Solec Kujawski | 42 | (5) |
| 2024–2025 | Zawisza Bydgoszcz | 38 | (1) |
| 2025–2026 | Tłuchowia Tłuchowo | 17 | (1) |
| 2026– | Unia Solec Kujawski | 22 | (3) |
- * Club domestic league appearances and goals as of 12:55, 8 September 2026 (UTC)

Oleksandr Vasylyovych Horvat (Ukrainian: Олександр Васильович Горват; born 17 June 1995) is a Ukrainian professional footballer who plays as a left-back for Polish IV liga Kuyavia-Pomerania club Unia Solec Kujawski.

== Honours ==
Unia Solec Kujawski

- IV liga Kuyavia-Pomerania: 2021–22

Zawisza Bygdoszcz

- Polish Cup (Kuyavia-Pomerania regionals): 2024–25
