= Stanislav Rabotov =

Bulgarian footballer

Personal information
- Full name: Stanislav Slavov Rabotov
- Date of birth: 14 June 2002 (age 24)
- Place of birth: Rakovski, Bulgaria
- Height: 1.79 m (5 ft 10 in)
- Position: Defender

Team information
- Current team: Rakovski
- Number: 3

Youth career
- Rakovski
- Botev Plovdiv

Senior career*
Years	Team	Apps	(Gls)
2019–2024	Botev Plovdiv	55	(0)
2021–2024	Botev Plovdiv II	32	(0)
2024–2025	Krumovgrad	21	(0)
2025	Hebar	4	(0)
2026–	Rakovski	0	(0)

International career^{‡}
2017–2018	Bulgaria U17	5	(0)
2019	Bulgaria U18	3	(0)
2020	Bulgaria U19	2	(0)
2020–2021	Bulgaria U21	2	(0)
- * Club domestic league appearances and goals as of 26 June 2025 ‡ National team caps and goals as of 30 March 2021

Stanislav Rabotov (Bulgarian: Станислав Работов; born 14 June 2002) is a Bulgarian professional footballer who plays as a defender for Rakovski.

== Career statistics ==
As of 24 December 2020

Club	League	Season	League		Cup		Continental		Total	
Club	League	Season	Apps	Goals	Apps	Goals	Apps	Goals	Apps	Goals
Botev Plovdiv	First League	2018–19	0	0	0	0	—		0	0
Botev Plovdiv	First League	2019–20	10	0	4	0	—		14	0
Botev Plovdiv	First League	2020–21	26	0	2	0	—		28	0
Career statistics			36	0	6	0	0	0	42	0
