= Bogomil Bozhurkin =

Bulgarian footballer (born 2002)

Personal information
- Full name: Bogomil Kostadinov Bozhurkin
- Date of birth: 2 September 2002 (age 24)
- Place of birth: Pazardzhik, Bulgaria
- Height: 1.75 m (5 ft 9 in)
- Position: Attacking midfielder

Team information
- Current team: Krumovgrad
- Number: 8

Youth career
- 2015–2020: Hebar Pazardzhik

Senior career*
Years	Team	Apps	(Gls)
2018–2024	Hebar	35	(0)
2020–2022	→ Hebar II	35	(4)
2024–2025	Pirin Blagoevgrad	29	(0)
2025–2026	Hebar	5	(0)
2026–	Krumovgrad	8	(0)

International career
2022	Bulgaria U21	1	(0)
- * Club domestic league appearances and goals as of 07:08, 30 October 2026 (UTC)

Bogomil Kostadinov Bozhurkin (Bulgarian: Богомил Костадинов Божуркин; born 2 September 2002) is a Bulgarian footballer who plays as an attacking midfielder for Krumovgrad.

== Career ==
Bozhurkin spent his youth years at the academy of Hebar Pazardzhik from 2015 to 2020. On 25 September 2018, he made his debut for the first team against Beroe Stara Zagora.

On November 3, 2022, he received his first call-up for the youth national team of Bulgaria.
