= Vasko Boev =

Bulgarian footballer (1988–2026)

Personal information
- Full name: Vasko Boyanov Boev
- Date of birth: 24 July 1988
- Place of birth: Varna, Bulgaria
- Date of death: 28 April 2026 (aged 37)
- Height: 1.76 m (5 ft 9 in)
- Position: Midfielder

Youth career
- –2007: Spartak Varna

Senior career*
| Years | Team | Apps | (Gls) |
| 2007–2013 | Spartak Varna | 69 | (2) |
| 2008 | → Volov Shumen (loan) | 13 | |
| 2014 | Atletic Provadia | 18 | (10) |
| 2014–2016 | Kaliakra Kavarna | 28 | (4) |
| 2016–2017 | Dobrudzha Dobrich | 35 | (8) |
| 2018–2020 | Spartak Varna | 57 | (12) |
| 2020–2026 | Ustrem Donchevo | | |

International career
- Bulgaria U17
- * Club domestic league appearances and goals

Vasko Boyanov Boev (Bulgarian: Васко Боянов Боев; 24 July 1988 – 28 April 2026) was a Bulgarian professional footballer who played as a midfielder.

== Career ==
Boev was raised in Spartak Varna's youth teams and made his debut in the A PFG on 12 August 2007 in a 2–2 draw with Botev Plovdiv. In 2013 he retired due to injury, but a year later he returned to play for the amateur side Atletic Provadia.

On 10 January 2018, Boev rejoined his youth club Spartak Varna coming from Dobrudzha Dobrich.

== Death ==
Boev died on 28 April 2026, at the age of 37.
