= Stefan Tsonkov =

Bulgarian footballer

Personal information
- Full name: Stefan Lyubomirov Tsonkov
- Date of birth: 24 January 1995 (age 31)
- Place of birth: Karlovo, Bulgaria
- Height: 1.86 m (6 ft 1 in)
- Position: Defender

Team information
- Current team: Hebar
- Number: 4

Senior career*
Years	Team	Apps	(Gls)
2012–2015	Elpida Agioi Anargyroi	87	(7)
2015–2016	Vyzas	27	(1)
2016–2017	Lokomotiv GO	16	(2)
2017–2022	Montana	103	(7)
2022–2024	CSKA 1948 II	15	(1)
2022–2024	CSKA 1948	2	(0)
2023–2024	→ Hebar (loan)	39	(6)
2024–2025	Botev Vratsa	20	(0)
2025	Hebar	15	(0)
2025–2026	Muangthong United	27	(2)
2026–	Hebar	7	(4)
- * Club domestic league appearances and goals as of 02:00, 15 May 2026 (UTC)

Stefan Tsonkov (Bulgarian: Стефан Цонков; born 24 January 1995) is a Bulgarian professional footballer who plays as a defender for Hebar Pazardzhik.
