= Nicholas Penev =

Bulgarian footballer (born 2005)

Personal information
- Full name: Nicholas Lyuboslav Penev
- Date of birth: 16 February 2005 (age 21)
- Place of birth: Sofia, Bulgaria
- Height: 1.88 m (6 ft 2 in)
- Position: Forward

Team information
- Current team: Lokomotiv Sofia
- Number: 71

Youth career
- Valencia
- Septemvri Sofia
- CSKA Sofia
- –2022: Botev Plovdiv
- 2022–2023: CSKA 1948

Senior career*
Years	Team	Apps	(Gls)
2022–2023	CSKA 1948 III	16	(2)
2023	Septemvri Sofia II	6	(0)
2023–2024	Hebar	31	(4)
2024	Lokomotiv Plovdiv	11	(0)
2025	Pirin Blagoevgrad	3	(0)
2026	CSKA Sofia III	5	(0)
2026–	Lokomotiv Sofia	3	(1)

International career^{‡}
2024	Bulgaria U20	1	(0)
- * Club domestic league appearances and goals as of 17:48, 2 August 2026 (UTC) ‡ National team caps and goals as of 11:44, 22 June 2023 (UTC)

Nicholas Penev (Bulgarian: Николас Пенев; born 16 February 2005) is a Bulgarian professional footballer who plays as a forward for Lokomotiv Sofia.

Nicholas is the son of Lyuboslav Penev, grandson of Mladen Penev and his granduncle is Dimitar Penev.

== Career ==
Born in Sofia in a football family, Nicholas joined CSKA Sofia academy at early age. He then moved to Botev Plovdiv Academy before joining CSKA 1948 in July 2022, where his father, Lyuboslav Penev, become manager. He spent a short time in the second team of Septemvri Sofia, before joining Hebar in July 2023. He scored his debut goal on 18 August 2023, in a league match against Lokomotiv Sofia.

== Career statistics ==
=== Club ===
As of 31 July 2026

Club performance			League		Cup		Continental		Other		Total	
Club	League	Season	Apps	Goals	Apps	Goals	Apps	Goals	Apps	Goals	Apps	Goals
Bulgaria			League		Bulgarian Cup		Europe		Other (Note: Includes Bulgarian Supercup matches.)		Total	
CSKA 1948 III	Third League	2022–23	16	2	–		–		–		16	2
Septemvri Sofia II	Third League	2022–23	6	0	–		–		–		6	0
Hebar	First League	2023–24	31	4	4	0	–		–		35	4
Lokomotiv Plovdiv	First League	2024–25	11	0	0	0	–		–		11	0
Pirin Blagoevgrad	Second League	2024–25	3	0	0	0	–		0	0	3	0
CSKA Sofia III	Third League	2025–26	5	0	0	0	–		0	0	5	0
Lokomotiv Sofia	First League	2026–27	3	1	0	0	–		–		3	1
Career statistics			75	7	4	0	0	0	0	0	79	7
