= FC Strumska Slava Radomir =

Bulgarian football club

Strumska Slava
- Full name: Football Club Strumska Slava
- Nickname: The Impalas
- Founded: 1927; 99 years ago
- Ground: Hristo Radovanov Stadium, Radomir
- Capacity: 5,000
- Manager: Stefan Goshev
- League: South-West Third League
- 2025–26: South-West Third League, 2nd
- Website: https://strumskaslava.com/
Home colours	Away colours

Strumska Slava (Bulgarian: Струмска слава) is a Bulgarian association football club based in Radomir, Pernik Province. The club currently plays in the South-West Third League, the third tier of Bulgarian football.

It was founded in 1927. The club colors are red and blue.

== History ==
Strumska Slava was founded in 1927. The club saw little success throughout the majority of its history, usually competing at or below the third level of Bulgarian football.

In 2017, Strumska Slava won the Southwest Third League and gained promotion to the Second League for the first time in history.

== Honours ==
- Bulgarian Cup
  - Quarter-finals (1): 2018–19
- Second League
  - Winners (1): 1953–54
- Third League
  - Winners (1): 2016–17

== Current squad ==
As of 1 November 2026

Note: Flags indicate national team as defined under FIFA eligibility rules; some limited exceptions apply. Players may hold more than one non-FIFA nationality.

No.	Pos.	Nation	Player
1	GK	BUL	Sergey Mitkov
2	MF	BUL	Borislav Nikolov (captain)
3	DF	BUL	Antonio Kirilov
4	DF	BUL	Boyan Stoynev
5	DF	BUL	Martin Kostov
6	DF	BUL	Rumen Gyonov
8	MF	BUL	Georgi Yanev
9	MF	BUL	Kristiyan Nikiforov
10	FW	BUL	Aleksandar Asparuhov
11	FW	BUL	Kitan Vasilev
12	GK	BUL	Yordan Dimitrov
14	MF	BUL	Teodor Ivanov

No.	Pos.	Nation	Player
16	DF	BUL	Ahmed Ademov
17	FW	BUL	Emilian Petrov
18	DF	BUL	Martin Mutafchiev
20	MF	BUL	Valentin Arhipov
21	DF	BUL	Nikola Mitkov
22	MF	BUL	Milen Voynov
33	MF	BUL	Nikolay Bolyarov
71	MF	BUL	Georgi Nikolaev
77	MF	BUL	Tsvetelin Stoichkov
80	DF	BUL	Martin Kirov
88	DF	BUL	Denislav Mitsakov

=== Foreign players ===
Only one non-EU nationals can be registered and given a squad number for the first team in the Second League. Those non-EU nationals with European ancestry can claim citizenship from the nation their ancestors came from. If a player does not have European ancestry he can claim Bulgarian citizenship after playing in Bulgaria for 5 years.

EU Nationals

EU Nationals (Dual citizenship)

Non-EU Nationals

== Notable players ==
Had international caps for their respective countries, held any club record, or had more than 100 league appearances. Players whose name is listed in bold represented their countries.

Bulgaria

- (Bulgaria) **Sasho Borisov**
- (Bulgaria) **Anton Evtimov**
- (Bulgaria) Kristiyan Kitov
- (Bulgaria) Georgi Mariyanov
- (Bulgaria) Borislav Nikolov
- (Bulgaria) **Simeon Petrov**
- (Bulgaria) Georgi Vasilev
- (Bulgaria) Georgi Yanev

== Goalscoring and appearance records ==
As of 25 May 2025

Most Second League appearances for the club

Rank	Name	Career	Appearances
1	(Bulgaria) Borislav Nikolov	2017–2025	242
2	(Bulgaria) **Martin Kostov**	2017–present	211
3	(Bulgaria) Dragomir Petkov	2018–2024	173
4	(Bulgaria) **Georgi Yanev**	2017–2019; 2021–present	166
5	(Bulgaria) **Denislav Mitsakov**	2017–2018; 2020–present	157
6	(Ukraine) **Aleksandar Asparuhov**	2017–2019; 2020–2022; 2023–2024; 2025–present	126
7	(Bulgaria) Anton Tungarov	2017–2023	120
8	(Bulgaria) Dimitar Petkov	2012–2022	115
9	(Bulgaria) Mario Dilchovski	2020–2021; 2022–2024	113
10	(Bulgaria) Kristiyan Kitov	2019–2024	104

- Players in **bold** are still playing for Strumska Slava.

== Past seasons ==
Season	League	Place	W	D	L	GF	GA	Pts	Bulgarian Cup
2009–10	V AFG (III)	8	14	9	13	55	43	51	not qualified
2010–11	V AFG	14	14	5	19	57	78	47	not qualified
2011–12	V AFG	16	10	6	20	44	63	36	not qualified
2012–13	V AFG	6	14	7	9	41	26	49	Second Round
2013–14	V AFG	10	10	5	15	36	36	35	not qualified
2014–15	V AFG	7	12	6	12	38	36	42	not qualified
2015–16	V AFG	4	18	6	8	58	36	60	not qualified
2016–17	Third League	1	22	9	2	75	20	75	not qualified
2017–18	Second League (II)	12	10	6	14	31	43	36	Second Round
2018–19	Second League	6	10	7	13	36	44	37	Quarter-finals
2019–20	Second League	13	7	1	13	21	34	22	Preliminary round
**Green marks a season followed by promotion, red marks a season followed by relegation.**
