= 2021–22 PFC Levski Sofia season =

Levski Sofia
2021–22 season
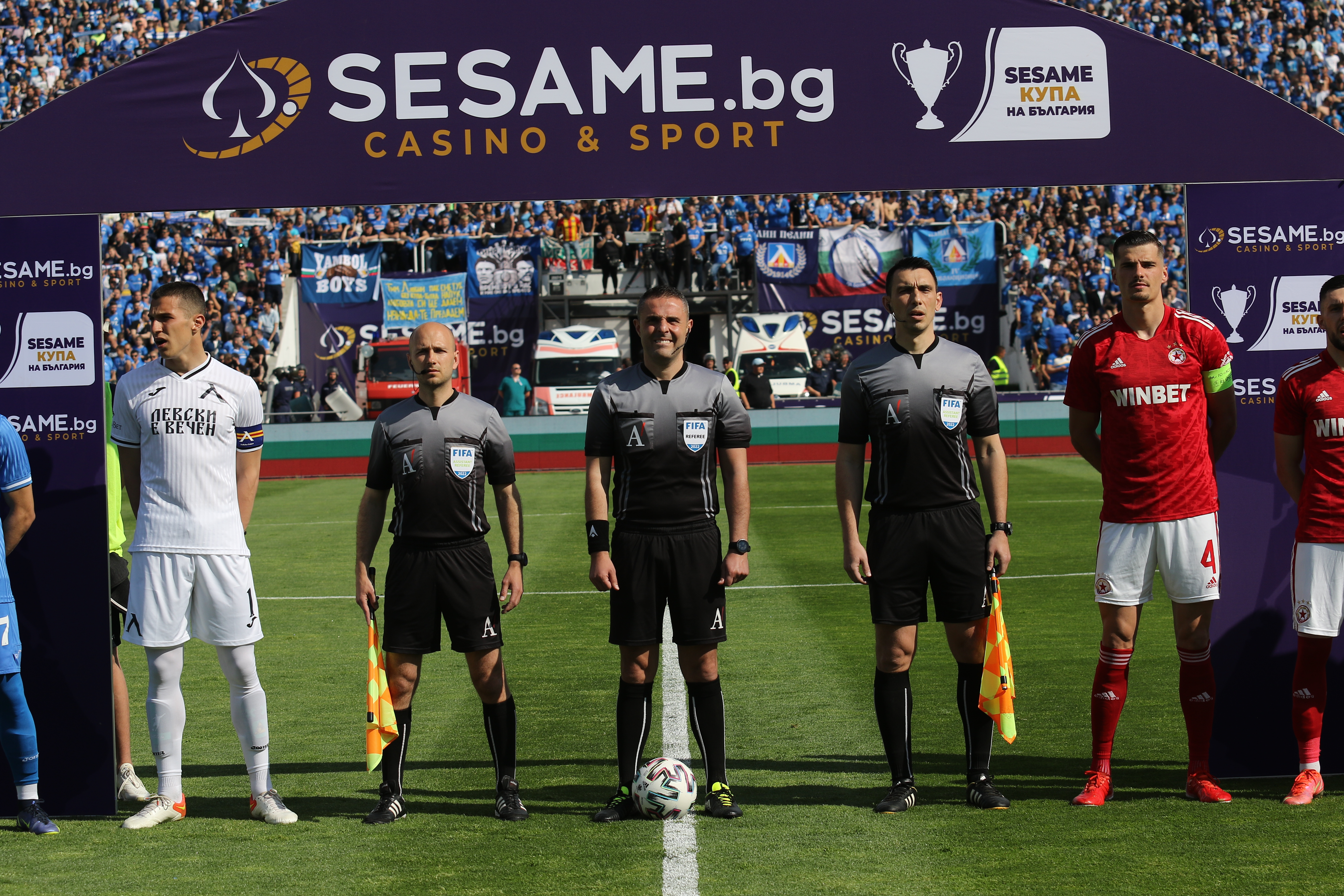
- Minutes before kick-off of the Bulgarian Cup final
- Chairman: Nasko Sirakov
- Manager: Zhivko Milanov (until 20 August 2021); Stanimir Stoilov (since 2 September 2021)
- Stadium: Vivacom Arena - Georgi Asparuhov
- First League: 4th
- Bulgarian Cup: Winners
- Top goalscorer: League: Bilal Bari (6); All: Bilal Bari (10)
- Highest home attendance: 19,000 v. CSKA Sofia (6 March 2022)
- Lowest home attendance: 800 v. Septemvri Simitli (26 October 2021)
- Average home league attendance: 6,700
- Biggest win: 7–0 v. Septemvri Simitli (H)
- Biggest defeat: 2–4 v. Ludogorets Razgrad (H)
Home colours	Away colours	Third colours

The 2021–22 season was Levski Sofia's 101st season in the First League. This article shows player statistics and all matches (official and friendly) that the club has played during the season.

This season marked the end of a 13-year trophy drought with Levski winning the 2021–22 Bulgarian Cup.

== Transfers ==
=== In ===
No.	Pos.	Nat.	Name	Age	EU	Moving from	Type	Transfer window	Ends	Transfer fee	Source
3	DF	(North Macedonia)	Gjoko Zajkov	26	Non-EU	(Belgium) Charleroi	Free transfer	Summer	2022	Free	
4	DF	(Bulgaria)	Ivan Goranov	29	EU	(Belgium) Charleroi	Loan	Summer	2022		
5	DF	(Cyprus)	Christos Shelis	21	EU	(Cyprus) APOEL	Free transfer	Summer	2023	Free	
5	DF	(Netherlands)	Kellian van der Kaap	23	EU	(Denmark) Viborg	Free transfer	Winter	2024	Free	
6	DF	(Brazil)	Wenderson Tsunami	25	Non-EU	(Brazil) Botafogo-PB	Free transfer	Winter	2024	Free	
7	MF	(Bulgaria)	Georgi Milanov	29	EU	Free agent	Free transfer	Summer	2022	Free	
14	MF	(Bulgaria)	Iliyan Stefanov	23	EU	(Bulgaria) Beroe	Free transfer	Winter	2024	Free	
17	FW	(Brazil)	Welton Felipe	24	Non-EU	(Brazil) Botafogo-PB	Transfer	Winter	2025	Undisclosed	
20	MF	(Bulgaria)	Dimitar Kostadinov	22	EU	(Bulgaria) Septemvri Sofia	Transfer	Summer	2024	Undisclosed	
23	DF	(Bulgaria)	Hristofor Hubchev	25	EU	(Bulgaria) Etar	Free transfer	Summer	2022	Free	
23	DF	(The Gambia)	Noah Sonko Sundberg	25	EU	(Sweden) Östersund	Free transfer	Winter	2024	Free	
30	MF	(Bulgaria)	Filip Krastev	20	EU	(Belgium) Lommel	Loan	Winter	2022		
33	DF	(Panama)	José Córdoba	20	Non-EU	(Bulgaria) Etar	Loan	Summer	2022		

=== Out ===
No.	Pos.	Nat.	Name	Age	EU	Moving to	Type	Transfer window	Transfer fee	Source
1	GK	(Croatia)	Zvonimir Mikulić	31	EU	(Turkey) Tuzlaspor	End of contract	Summer	Free	
3	DF	(Bulgaria)	Zhivko Atanasov	30	EU	(Bulgaria) Cherno More	Released	Summer	Free	
3	DF	(North Macedonia)	Gjoko Zajkov	26	Non-EU	(Ukraine) Vorskla Poltava	Released	Winter	Free	
4	MF	(Bulgaria)	Martin Raynov	29	EU	(Israel) Ashdod	End of contract	Summer	Free	
5	DF	(Cyprus)	Christos Shelis	21	EU	(Greece) Volos	Released	Winter	Free	
6	DF	(Bulgaria)	Ivaylo Naydenov	23	EU	(Bulgaria) Hebar	Released	Winter	Free	
8	MF	(Bulgaria)	Simeon Slavchev	28	EU	(Bulgaria) Lokomotiv Sofia	Released	Summer	Free	
9	FW	(Bulgaria)	Steven Petkov	26	EU	(Portugal) Feirense	Loan return	Summer	Free	
10	MF	(Bulgaria)	Borislav Tsonev	26	EU	(Ukraine) Chornomorets Odesa	Released	Winter	Free	
12	GK	(Bulgaria)	Nikolay Krastev	24	EU		End of contract	Summer	Free	
14	DF	(Bulgaria)	Mateo Stamatov	22	EU	(Russia) Orenburg	End of contract	Summer	Free	
15	DF	(Bulgaria)	Bogdan Kostov	19	EU	(Bulgaria) CSKA 1948	Released	Summer	Free	
20	DF	(Spain)	Nacho Monsalve	27	EU	(Poland) ŁKS Łódź	Released	Summer	Free	
23	DF	(Bulgaria)	Hristofor Hubchev	25	EU	(Bulgaria) Pirin Blagoevgrad	Released	Summer	Free	
31	DF	(Bulgaria)	Kostadin Iliev	19	EU	(Bulgaria) CSKA 1948	Released	Summer	Free	
41	DF	(Bulgaria)	Georgi Aleksandrov	20	EU	(Bulgaria) Etar	Released	Winter	Free	
45	FW	(Bulgaria)	Iliya Dimitrov	24	EU	(Bulgaria) Lokomotiv Sofia	Released	Summer	Free	
70	FW	(Bulgaria)	Ivaylo Hristov	19	EU	(Bulgaria) Sportist Svoge	Released	Summer	Free	
77	MF	(Bulgaria)	Iliya Yurukov	21	EU	(Bulgaria) Arda	Released	Summer	Free	
79	FW	(Bulgaria)	Martin Petkov	19	EU	(Ukraine) Chornomorets Odesa	Transfer	Winter	Undisclosed	
86	FW	(Bulgaria)	Valeri Bojinov	35	EU		Released	Summer	Free	
	GK	(Bulgaria)	Petar Ivanov	21	EU	(Bulgaria) Yantra	End of contract	Summer	Free	

=== Loans out ===
No.	Pos.	Nat.	Name	Age	EU	Moving to	Type	Transfer window	Transfer fee	Source
	GK	(Bulgaria)	Ivan Andonov	17	EU	(Italy) Fiorentina Primavera	Loan	Summer	—	
	DF	(Bulgaria)	Denis Dinev	17	EU	(Bulgaria) Yantra	Loan	Summer	—	

== Squad ==
Updated on 7 April 2022.

No.	Name	Nationality	Position(s)	Age	EU	Ends	Signed from	Transfer fee	Notes
Goalkeepers
1	Plamen Andreev	Bulgaria	GK	21	EU	2024	Youth system	W/S	
13	Nikolay Mihaylov	Bulgaria	GK	38	EU	2022	(Cyprus) Omonia	Free	Originally from Youth system
99	Yoan Zagorov	Bulgaria	GK	21	EU		Youth system	W/S	
Defenders
4	Ivan Goranov	Bulgaria	LB	34	EU	2022	(Belgium) Charleroi	Loan	Originally from Youth system
5	Kellian van der Kaap	Netherlands	CB	28	EU	2024	(Denmark) Viborg	Free	Second nationality: Cameroon
6	Wenderson Tsunami	Brazil	LB	30	Non-EU	2024	(Brazil) Botafogo-PB	Free	
22	Patrick-Gabriel Galchev	Bulgaria	RB/LB/RW	25	EU	2024	Youth system	W/S	Second nationality: Spain
23	Noah Sonko Sundberg	Gambia	CB/RB	30	EU	2024	(Sweden) Östersund	Free	Second nationality: Sweden
33	José Córdoba	Panama	CB/LB/DM	25	Non-EU	2022	(Bulgaria) Etar	Loan	
91	Dragan Mihajlović	Switzerland	RB	35	EU	2022	(Cyprus) APOEL	Free	
Midfielders
7	Georgi Milanov	Bulgaria	AM/LW	34	EU	2022	(Hungary) Fehérvár	Free	
8	Andrian Kraev	Bulgaria	DM	27	EU	2024	(Bulgaria) Hebar	Free	Originally from Youth system
10	Radoslav Tsonev	Bulgaria	CM	31	EU	2022	(Italy) Lecce	Free	Originally from Youth system
14	Iliyan Stefanov	Bulgaria	AM	28	EU	2024	(Bulgaria) Beroe	Free	Originally from Youth system
20	Dimitar Kostadinov	Bulgaria	CM	27	EU	2024	(Bulgaria) Septemvri Sofia	Undisclosed	
27	Asen Mitkov	Bulgaria	AM/CM	21	EU	2024	Youth system	W/S	
30	Filip Krastev	Bulgaria	AM/CM	25	EU	2022	(Belgium) Lommel	Loan	
71	Antoan Stoyanov	Bulgaria	DM	21	EU	2024	Youth system	W/S	
Forwards
11	Zdravko Dimitrov	Bulgaria	LW	28	EU	2022	(Bulgaria) Septemvri Sofia	Free	
17	Welton Felipe	Brazil	LW/CF	29	Non-EU	2025	(Brazil) Botafogo-PB	Undisclosed	
19	Bilal Bari	Morocco	CF	28	EU	2024	(Bulgaria) Montana	50 000 €	Second nationality: France
88	Marin Petkov	Bulgaria	RW/CF/AM	23	EU	2024	Youth system	W/S	

== Performance overview ==
Competition	First match	Last match	Starting round	Final position	Record							
Competition	First match	Last match	Starting round	Final position	Pld	W	D	L	GF	GA	GD	Win %
First League	24 July 2021	22 May 2022	Matchday 1	4th	31	15	7	9	38	27	+11	48.39
Bulgarian Cup	22 September 2021	15 May 2022	Round of 32	Winners	6	6	0	0	16	2	+14	100.00
Total					37	21	7	9	54	29	+25	56.76

Last updated: 22 May 2022
Source: Fixtures

== Fixtures ==
Win Draw Loss Upcoming fixture

=== Friendlies ===
==== Summer ====
26 June 2021	Levski Sofia	1–0	Lokomotiv Plovdiv	Sofia
10:30 EEST	Bari 5'	Report		Stadium: Vivacom Arena - Georgi Asparuhov; Referee: Vasimir El-Hatib (Sofia)

3 July 2021	Levski Sofia	1–1	Botev Plovdiv	Sofia
18:00 EEST	B. Tsonev 42'	Report	Genev 87'	Stadium: Vivacom Arena - Georgi Asparuhov; Referee: Volen Chinkov (Sofia)

7 July 2021	Levski Sofia	4–0	Lokomotiv Sofia	Sofia
18:00 EEST	Naydenov 21'; M. Petkov 23'; Bari 51'; Galchev 66'	Report		Stadium: Vivacom Arena - Georgi Asparuhov; Referee: Dimitar Dimitrov (Sofia)

10 July 2021	Levski Sofia	1–1	Levski Lom	Sofia
11:00 EEST	Hristov 43' (o.g.)	Report	Gushterov 13'	Stadium: Vivacom Arena - Georgi Asparuhov; Referee: Stanimir Trenchev (Sofia)

17 July 2021	Levski Sofia	2–0	Etar	Sofia
18:00 EEST	Dimitrov 6'; M. D. Petkov 8'	Report		Stadium: Vivacom Arena - Georgi Asparuhov; Referee: Ivaylo Nenkov (Sofia)

==== Mid-season ====
3 September 2021	Levski Sofia	2–1	Sportist Svoge	Sofia
18:00 EEST	Milanov 52' (pen.); Todorov 66'	Report	Harizanov 90'	Stadium: Vivacom Arena - Georgi Asparuhov; Referee: Dimitar Dimitrov (Sofia)

8 September 2021	Levski Sofia	5–2	Maritsa Plovdiv	Sofia
18:00 EEST	Dimitrov 10'; Bari 16'; Kostadinov 26'; M. Petkov 77' (pen.); Ivanov 79'	Report	Tonev 39' (pen.); Yordanov 55'	Stadium: Vivacom Arena - Georgi Asparuhov; Referee: Ivo Andreev (Sofia)

12 October 2021	Levski Sofia	4–0	Strumska Slava	Sofia
15:00 EEST	M. Petkov 5'; Bari 9'; Kostadinov 44'; Naydenov 82'	Report		Stadium: Vivacom Arena - Georgi Asparuhov; Referee: Yoto Garabedov (Sofia)

13 November 2021	Levski Sofia	0–1	Pirin Blagoevgrad	Sofia
14:00 EET		Report	Bengyuzov 51'	Stadium: Vivacom Arena - Georgi Asparuhov; Referee: Dimitar Dimitrov (Sofia)

26 March 2022	Levski Sofia	1–1	Sozopol	Sofia
14:00 EET	Bari 38'	Report	Ushagelov 83'	Stadium: Vivacom Arena - Georgi Asparuhov; Referee: Georgi Dimitrov (Sofia)

30 March 2022	Levski Sofia	3–2	Septemvri Sofia	Sofia
16:00 EEST	Milanov 40' (pen.); Bachev 47'; Welton 58'	Report	Ivanov 87', 90'	Stadium: Vivacom Arena - Georgi Asparuhov; Referee: Dimitar Burov (Sofia)

==== Winter ====
18 January 2022	Levski Sofia (Bulgaria)	1–1	(Poland) Górnik Zabrze	Belek, Turkey
17:00 TRT	Córdoba 89' (pen.)	Report	Krawzcyk 82'	Stadium: Regnum Carya Complex

21 January 2022	Levski Sofia (Bulgaria)	1–1	(Czech Republic) Bohemians 1905	Belek, Turkey
17:00 TRT	Bari 14'	Report	Květ 46'	Stadium: TSS Football Center

29 January 2022	Levski Sofia (Bulgaria)	2–2	(Slovenia) Maribor	Belek, Turkey
19:00 TRT	Córdoba 36'; Dimitrov 77'	Report	Repas 41'; Ivanović 45+1'	Stadium: Susesi Sports Complex

1 February 2022	Levski Sofia (Bulgaria)	0–1	(Turkey) Gençlerbirliği	Belek, Turkey
17:00 TRT		Report	Karakaş 72' (pen.)	Stadium: Kaya Football Center

4 February 2022	Levski Sofia (Bulgaria)	1–1	(Ukraine) Dynamo Kyiv	Antalya, Turkey
17:00 TRT	Kostadinov 76'	Report	Buyalskyi 32'	Stadium: Mardan Sports Complex

7 February 2022	Levski Sofia (Bulgaria)	2–1	(Ukraine) Veres Rivne	Belek, Turkey
13:00 TRT	M. Petkov 1'; Dimitrov 62'	Report	Serhiychuk 44'	Stadium: TSS Football Center

12 February 2022	Levski Sofia	3–1	Pirin Blagoevgrad	Sofia
14:00 EET	Bari 8', 89'; Kostadinov 53'	Report	Karachanakov 48'	Stadium: Vivacom Arena - Georgi Asparuhov; Referee: Ivan Ivanov (Sofia)

15 February 2022	Levski Sofia	0–0	Tsarsko Selo	Sofia
14:00 EET		Report		Stadium: Vivacom Arena - Georgi Asparuhov; Referee: Ivo Andreev (Sofia)

=== First League ===
==== Preliminary stage ====
===== League table =====
Pos	Team	Pld	W	D	L	GF	GA	GD	Pts	Qualification
3	Botev Plovdiv	26	13	7	6	34	28	+6	46	Qualification for the Championship group
4	Cherno More	26	12	9	5	35	18	+17	45	Qualification for the Championship group
5	Levski Sofia	26	12	6	8	33	25	+8	42	Qualification for the Championship group
6	Slavia Sofia	26	9	9	8	30	26	+4	36	Qualification for the Championship group
7	Lokomotiv Plovdiv	26	9	7	10	30	35	−5	34	Qualification for the Europa Conference League group

Source: soccerway, Bulgarian Football
Rules for classification: 1) Points; 2) Head-to-head points; 3) Head-to-head goal difference; 4) Head-to-head goals scored; 5) Head-to-head away goals scored (only if two teams); 6) Goal difference; 7) Goals scored; 8) Fairplay ranking; 9) Draw.

===== Results summary =====
Overall								Home						Away					
Pld	W	D	L	GF	GA	GD	Pts	W	D	L	GF	GA	GD	W	D	L	GF	GA	GD
26	12	6	8	33	25	+8	42	7	3	3	18	11	+7	5	3	5	15	14	+1

Last updated: April 2022.
Source: bulgarian-football.com

===== Results by round =====
Round	1	2	3	4	5	6	7	8	9	10	11	12	13	14	15	16	17	18	19	20	21	22	23	24	25	26
Ground	H	A	H	H	A	H	A	H	A	H	A	H	A	A	H	A	A	H	A	H	A	H	A	H	A	H
Result	L	L	L	W	L	W	D	D	L	L	W	W	L	W	D	D	W	W	D	W	W	D	L	W	W	W
Position	10	12	14	11	12	8	9	10	11	11	8	7	9	9	8	8	8	6	6	6	5	5	6	5	5	5

Source: See Results
A = Away; H = Home; W = Win; D = Draw; L = Loss

===== Matches =====
24 July 2021 1	Levski Sofia	1–2	Slavia Sofia	Sofia
21:00 EEST	M. Petkov 16', (yellow card) 57'; Galchev (yellow card) 45+2'; Aleksandrov (yellow card) 45+4'; Shelis (yellow card) 76'; Kraev (yellow card) 79'; M. D. Petkov (yellow card) 82'	Report	Viyachki 22', (yellow card) 90+3'; Sorakov (yellow card) 36'; Makrillos (yellow card) 43'; Valchev (yellow card) 53'; Krastev 68'; Hristov (yellow card) 84'	Stadium: Vivacom Arena - Georgi Asparuhov; Attendance: 7,500; Referee: Volen Chinkov (Sofia); Man of the Match: Kaloyan Krastev

31 July 2021 2	Botev Vratsa	2–0	Levski Sofia	Vratsa
18:45 EEST	Babunski 5', 59' (pen.); Marinov (yellow card) 27'; Vasilev (yellow card) 34'; Nikolov (yellow card) 41'	Report	M. Petkov (yellow card) 36'; B. Tsonev (penalty missed) 41'	Stadium: Hristo Botev; Attendance: 2,000; Referee: Stanimir Trenchev (Sofia); Man of the Match: Dorian Babunski

8 August 2021 3	Levski Sofia	0–2	Arda	Sofia
21:45 EEST	Bari (yellow card) 64'	Report	Yordanov 20' (pen.); Karadzhov (yellow card) 28'; Delev 32'; Juninho (yellow card) 64'	Stadium: Vivacom Arena - Georgi Asparuhov; Attendance: 4,200; Referee: Valentin Zhelezov (Burgas); Man of the Match: Spas Delev

14 August 2021 4	Levski Sofia	3–1	Tsarsko Selo	Sofia
21:00 EEST	B. Tsonev 58', (yellow card) 66'; M. D. Petkov 63'; Dimitrov (yellow card) 72'; Kraev 90+3'	Report	Shopov 28'; Popadiyn (yellow card) 55'; Bakalov (yellow card) 64'; Dias (yellow card) 74'; Vasilev (yellow card) 90+1'	Stadium: Vivacom Arena - Georgi Asparuhov; Attendance: 3,200; Referee: Dragomir Draganov (Varna); Man of the Match: Borislav Tsonev

20 August 2021 5	Botev Plovdiv	3–1	Levski Sofia	Plovdiv
21:00 EEST	Rabeï (yellow card) 13'; Minkov (yellow card) 32'; Nedelev 45+5' (pen.); Iliev (yellow card) 57'; Slavchev 65' (o.g.); Baroan 75'	Report	Galchev (red card) 45+2'; Shelis (yellow card) 63'; R. Tsonev (yellow card) 68', (goal) 81' (pen.); Kraev (yellow card) 90+3'	Stadium: Botev 1912 Football Complex; Attendance: 1,500; Referee: Ivaylo Stoyanov (Petrich); Man of the Match: Todor Nedelev

28 August 2021 6	Levski Sofia	2–1	Beroe	Sofia
21:00 EEST	Bari (yellow card) 21'; Hubchev 30', (red card) 37'; B. Tsonev 42', (yellow card) 90'; Naydenov (yellow card) 90+2'	Report	Lebon 64'; Hadzhiev (yellow card) 84'	Stadium: Vivacom Arena - Georgi Asparuhov; Attendance: 2,000; Referee: Georgi Kabakov (Plovdiv); Man of the Match: Borislav Tsonev

12 September 2021 7	Lokomotiv Plovdiv	2–2	Levski Sofia	Plovdiv
21:00 EEST	Umarbayev (yellow card) 23'; Pirgov (yellow card) 42'; Petrović (yellow card) 63'; Karagaren 73'; Iliev 80'; Bykov (yellow card) 90+8'	Report	R. Tsonev (yellow card) 31'; Karagaren 37' (o.g.); Milanov 76'; M. D. Petkov (yellow card) 86'	Stadium: Lokomotiv; Attendance: 4,500; Referee: Nikola Popov (Sofia); Man of the Match: Georgi Milanov

18 September 2021 8	Levski Sofia	0–0	CSKA 1948	Sofia
19:45 EEST	B. Tsonev (yellow card) 90'	Report	Stoyanov (yellow card) 32'; Marin (yellow card) 86'; Ivanov (yellow card) 90+1'; D. Aleksandrov (yellow card) 90+4'	Stadium: Vivacom Arena - Georgi Asparuhov; Attendance: 7,000; Referee: Stanislav Todorov (Shumen); Man of the Match: Daniel Naumov

26 September 2021 9	CSKA Sofia	2–1	Levski Sofia	Sofia
16:30 EEST	Carey 44'; Muhar (yellow card) 55'; Caicedo 65', (yellow card) 66'; Turitsov (yellow card) 84'	Report	Milanov 28'; R. Tsonev (yellow card) 72'	Stadium: Vasil Levski National Stadium; Attendance: 14,000; Referee: Volen Chinkov (Sofia); Man of the Match: Graham Carey

3 October 2021 10	Levski Sofia	2–4	Ludogorets Razgrad	Sofia
20:15 EEST	Kraev (yellow card) 14'; B. Tsonev 26', 81' (pen.); Bari (yellow card) 49'; Shelis (yellow card) 74'; R. Tsonev (yellow card) 80'; M. Petkov (yellow card) 86'	Report	Yankov 29'; Sotiriou 47', (yellow card) 48'; Plastun (yellow card) 68'; Manu 85', (yellow card) 85'; Gonçalves (yellow card) 87'; Tekpetey 89'	Stadium: Vivacom Arena - Georgi Asparuhov; Attendance: 5,000; Referee: Georgi Kabakov (Plovdiv); Man of the Match: Kiril Despodov

16 October 2021 11	Lokomotiv Sofia	1–2	Levski Sofia	Sofia
20:00 EEST	Octávio 2'; Celso (yellow card) 9'; Duarte (yellow card) 53'; Aleksandrov (yellow card) 53'; Krachunov (penalty missed) 71'; Katsarov (yellow card) 88'	Report	Dimitrov 37', (yellow card) 76'; Kraev (yellow card) 49'; Bari 57'; Mihajlović (yellow card) 70'; Milanov (yellow card) 86'; Goranov (yellow card) 90+5'	Stadium: Vasil Levski National Stadium; Attendance: 0 Referee: Radoslav Gidzhenov (Plovdiv); Man of the Match: Nikolay Mihaylov
Note: On 12 October 2021, the Regional Health Inspectorate of Sofia City announced that the stadiums are not allowed to host spectators due to a recent spike of COVID-19-related infections.

23 October 2021 12	Levski Sofia	3–0	Pirin Blagoevgrad	Sofia
18:45 EEST	M. Petkov 25', 63'; B. Tsonev (yellow card) 70'; R. Tsonev (yellow card) 88'; Bari 90'	Report	Zanev (yellow card) 16'; Nikolov (yellow card) 80'	Stadium: Vivacom Arena - Georgi Asparuhov; Attendance: 0 Referee: Nikola Popov (Sofia); Man of the Match: Marin Petkov
Note: The match was played behind closed doors due to a punishment to Levski by BFU.

30 October 2021 13	Cherno More	1–0	Levski Sofia	Varna
19:00 EEST	Álvarez (yellow card) 45' (yellow-red card) 90'; Rodrigo 49'	Report		Stadium: Ticha; Attendance: 2,500; Referee: Stanimir Trenchev (Sofia); Man of the Match: Rodrigo Henrique

6 November 2021 14	Slavia Sofia	0–1	Levski Sofia	Sofia
17:30 EET	Tombak (yellow card) 20'; Dost (yellow card) 47' (yellow-red card) 61'; Kerchev (yellow card) 54'; Vutsov (yellow card) 82'	Report	Córdoba (yellow card) 59'; Bari 81', (yellow card) 86'; Mihajlović (yellow card) 90+2'	Stadium: Aleksandar Shalamanov; Attendance: 3,300; Referee: Ivaylo Stoyanov (Petrich); Man of the Match: Bilal Bari

22 November 2021 15	Levski Sofia	0–0	Botev Vratsa	Sofia
17:30 EET	B. Tsonev (penalty missed) 72'; Zajkov (yellow card) 90+2'	Report	Babunski (penalty missed) 7'; Serginho (yellow card) 58'; Nenov (yellow card) 64'; Cassini (yellow card) 90+1'	Stadium: Vivacom Arena - Georgi Asparuhov; Attendance: 2,000; Referee: Dimo Dimov (Sliven); Man of the Match: Krasimir Kostov

27 November 2021 16	Arda	0–0	Levski Sofia	Kardzhali
17:30 EET	Kotev (yellow card) 2'; Kiki (yellow card) 19'; Juninho (yellow card) 33'; Kovachev (yellow card) 82'	Report	Córdoba (yellow card) 8'	Stadium: Arena Arda; Attendance: 1,200; Referee: Stanimir Trenchev (Sofia); Man of the Match: Nikolay Mihaylov

1 December 2021 17	Tsarsko Selo	0–1	Levski Sofia	Sofia
17:30 EET	Kavdanski (yellow card) 68'; Ohene (yellow card) 84'	Report	Bari 43'; Kraev (yellow card) 45+3'; Córdoba (yellow card) 90'	Stadium: Arena Tsarsko Selo; Attendance: 0 Referee: Nikola Popov (Sofia); Man of the Match: Nikolay Mihaylov
Note: The match was played behind closed doors due to the home team's voluntary rejection of spectators.

4 December 2021 18	Levski Sofia	2–0	Botev Plovdiv	Sofia
15:00 EET	B. Tsonev (yellow card) 2', (goal) 79'; Zajkov 6'; Dimitrov (yellow card) 60'; R. Tsonev (yellow card) 90+1'	Report	Minkov (yellow card) 51'; Jansson (yellow card) 66'; Tonev (yellow card) 90+2'	Stadium: Vivacom Arena - Georgi Asparuhov; Attendance: 2,500; Referee: Valentin Zhelezov (Burgas); Man of the Match: Borislav Tsonev

12 December 2021 19	Beroe	1–1	Levski Sofia	Stara Zagora
16:30 EET	Furtado (yellow card) 34'; Lebon (yellow card) 48'; Fall 87'	Report	Bari 17'; Galchev (yellow card) 26'; Goranov (yellow card) 43'; Kostadinov (yellow card) 48'; R. Tsonev (yellow card) 76'	Stadium: Beroe; Attendance: 2,500; Referee: Georgi Kabakov (Plovdiv); Man of the Match: Nikolay Mihaylov

19 February 2022 20	Levski Sofia	2–1	Lokomotiv Plovdiv	Sofia
15:00 EET	Kraev 22'; Krastev 32'; Welton (yellow card) 55'	Report	Paskalev (red card) 20'; Petrović 30'; Iliev (yellow card) 45+4'; Vasilev (yellow card) 72'	Stadium: Vivacom Arena - Georgi Asparuhov; Attendance: 14,000; Referee: Volen Chinkov (Sofia); Man of the Match: Filip Krastev

26 February 2022 21	CSKA 1948	0–2	Levski Sofia	Bistritsa
15:00 EET	S. Aleksandrov (yellow card) 47'; Bastunov (yellow card) 90+1'	Report	Kostadinov 23'; Kraev (yellow card) 25'; Welton (yellow card) 42', (goal) 60'; Galchev (yellow card) 56'; Córdoba (yellow card) 89'; Bari (yellow card) 90'	Stadium: Bistritsa; Attendance: 700; Referee: Vasimir El-Hatib (Sofia); Man of the Match: Dimitar Kostadinov

6 March 2022 22	Levski Sofia	0–0	CSKA Sofia	Sofia
14:00 EET	Tsunami (yellow card) 35' (yellow-red card) 54'; Kraev (yellow card) 77'	Report	Youga (yellow card) 45+5'; Yomov (yellow card) 63'; Mazikou (red card) 90+2'	Stadium: Vasil Levski National Stadium; Attendance: 19,000; Referee: Valentin Zhelezov (Burgas); Man of the Match: Nikolay Mihaylov

13 March 2022 23	Ludogorets Razgrad	2–1	Levski Sofia	Razgrad
17:45 EET	Sotiriou (yellow card) 35', (goal) 90'; Santana 62', (yellow card) 68'; Rick (yellow card) 86'; Despodov (yellow card) 88'	Report	Bari 20'; Sundberg (yellow card) 35'; Stefanov (yellow card) 50' van der Kaap (yellow card) 53'	Stadium: Huvepharma Arena; Attendance: 4,133; Referee: Georgi Kabakov (Plovdiv); Man of the Match: Pieros Sotiriou

19 March 2022 24	Levski Sofia	1–0	Lokomotiv Sofia	Sofia
17:30 EET	Stefanov 35'	Report	Celso (yellow card) 26'; Ivanov (yellow card) 54'	Stadium: Vivacom Arena - Georgi Asparuhov; Attendance: 4,000; Referee: Nikola Popov (Sofia); Man of the Match: Iliyan Stefanov

3 April 2022 25	Pirin Blagoevgrad	0–3	Levski Sofia	Blagoevgrad
17:30 EEST	Dyakov (yellow card) 27'	Report	Welton 4'; Stefanov (yellow card) 19', (goal) 45', 73'; Mihajlović (yellow card) 90'	Stadium: Hristo Botev; Attendance: 4,500; Referee: Ivo Andreev (Sofia); Man of the Match: Iliyan Stefanov

9 April 2022 26	Levski Sofia	2–0	Cherno More	Sofia
20:00 EEST	Krastev (yellow card) 29'; Dimov 74' (o.g.); M. Petkov 90+7'	Report	Dimov (yellow card) 26'; Serdyuk (yellow card) 29' (yellow-red card) 54'; Vasilev (yellow card) 31'; Coureur (yellow card) 35'; Panov (yellow card) 45'; Drobarov (yellow card) 58'; Dyulgerov (yellow card) 75'; Popov (yellow card) 83'; Atanasov (yellow card) 90+6'	Stadium: Vivacom Arena - Georgi Asparuhov; Attendance: 6,500; Referee: Volen Chinkov (Sofia); Man of the Match: Iliyan Stefanov

==== Championship round ====
===== League table =====
Pos	Team	Pld	W	D	L	GF	GA	GD	Pts	Qualification
1	Ludogorets Razgrad (C)	31	26	1	4	77	25	+52	79	Qualification for the Champions League first qualifying round
2	CSKA Sofia	31	16	10	5	42	31	+11	58	Qualification for the Europa Conference League second qualifying round
3	Botev Plovdiv (O)	31	15	8	8	38	33	+5	53	Qualification for the Europa Conference League play-off
4	Levski Sofia	31	15	7	9	38	27	+11	52	Qualification for the Europa Conference League second qualifying round (Note: Levski Sofia qualified for the Europa Conference League by winning the 2021–22 Bulgarian Cup.)
5	Cherno More	31	12	11	8	36	22	+14	47	
6	Slavia Sofia	31	9	10	12	35	38	−3	37	

Source: Soccerway, Bulgarian Football
Rules for classification: 1) Points; 2) Head-to-head points; 3) Head-to-head goal difference; 4) Head-to-head goals scored; 5) Head-to-head away goals scored (only if two teams); 6) Goal difference; 7) Goals scored; 8) Fairplay ranking; 9) Draw.
(C) Champions; (O) Play-off winners

===== Results summary =====
Overall								Home						Away					
Pld	W	D	L	GF	GA	GD	Pts	W	D	L	GF	GA	GD	W	D	L	GF	GA	GD
5	3	1	1	5	2	+3	10	1	0	1	2	1	+1	2	1	0	3	1	+2

Last updated: 22 May 2022.
Source: See results

===== Results by round =====
Round	1	2	3	4	5
Ground	A	H	A	A	H
Result	D	W	W	W	L
Position	5	4	3	3	4

Source: See Results
A = Away; H = Home; W = Win; D = Draw; L = Loss

===== Matches =====
17 April 2022 27	CSKA Sofia	0–0	Levski Sofia	Sofia
17:00 EEST	Youga (yellow card) 37'; Carey (yellow card) 45+2'; Geferson (yellow card) 59'; Turitsov (yellow card) 75'	Report	Stefanov (yellow card) 51'; Welton (yellow card) 56'	Stadium: Vasil Levski National Stadium; Attendance: 15,500; Referee: Georgi Kabakov (Plovdiv); Man of the Match: Nikolay Mihaylov

30 April 2022 28	Levski Sofia	2–0	Botev Plovdiv	Sofia
17:30 EEST	Krastev 11' (pen.), (yellow card) 83'; Sundberg 36'; Welton (yellow card) 88'; M. Petkov (yellow card) 90+2'	Report	Souprayen (yellow card) 1'	Stadium: Vivacom Arena - Georgi Asparuhov; Attendance: 10,600; Referee: Georgi Dimitrov (Sofia); Man of the Match: Filip Krastev

6 May 2022 29	Cherno More	0–1	Levski Sofia	Varna
17:30 EEST	Panov (yellow card) 43'; Álvarez (yellow card) 56'; Coureur (yellow card) 81'; Serdyuk (yellow card) 83'	Report	Córdoba (yellow card) 27'; Tsunami 85', (yellow card) 89'	Stadium: Ticha; Attendance: 8,000; Referee: Stanimir Trenchev (Sofia); Man of the Match: Nikolay Mihaylov

19 May 2022 30	Slavia Sofia	1–2	Levski Sofia	Sofia
20:15 EEST	Minchev (yellow card) 32'; Valchev 62' (pen.); K. Stoyanov (yellow card) 66'; Tasev (yellow card) 68'	Report	Stefanov 38'; Kraev (yellow card) 76'; Krastev 83'	Stadium: Aleksandar Shalamanov; Attendance: 2,000; Referee: Georgi Davidov (Veliko Tarnovo); Man of the Match: Filip Krastev

22 May 2022 31	Levski Sofia	0–1	Ludogorets Razgrad	Sofia
20:30 EEST	van der Kaap (yellow card) 35'; Kraev (yellow card) 41'; Mihajlović (yellow card) 56'	Report	Verdon (yellow card) 11'; Cicinho 28'; Sotiriou (yellow card) 58'; Plastun (yellow card) 90'; Tekpetey (yellow card) 90+2'	Stadium: Vivacom Arena - Georgi Asparuhov; Attendance: 13,000; Referee: Vladimir Valkov (Plovdiv); Man of the Match: Kiril Despodov

=== Bulgarian Cup ===
22 September 2021 Round of 32	Marek	0–2	Levski Sofia	Dupnitsa
13:00 EEST	Gyonov (yellow card) 66'	Report	Kostadinov 11', 32'; Kraev (yellow card) 85'	Stadium: Bonchuk; Attendance: 3,000; Referee: Georgi Ginchev (Veliko Tarnovo)

26 October 2021 Round of 16	Levski Sofia	7–0	Septemvri Simitli	Sofia
19:00 EEST	M. Petkov 20'; Bari 22', 27', 70'; Kraev (yellow card) 24'; Milanov 68'; B. Tsonev 80'; Kostadinov 82'	Report	Trayanov (yellow card) 66'	Stadium: Vivacom Arena - Georgi Asparuhov; Attendance: 800; Referee: Vasimir El-Hatib (Sofia)

2 March 2022 Quarterfinal	Septemvri Sofia	0–2	Levski Sofia	Sofia
17:30 EET	Peshov (yellow card) 42'	Report	Kostadinov 21'; Milanov 48' (pen.), (yellow card) 64'; Mitkov (yellow card) 90+2'	Stadium: Vivacom Arena - Georgi Asparuhov (Note: Septemvri Sofia will host the match at Vivacom Arena - Georgi Asparuhov, Sofia, instead of their own home venue Stadion DIT, Sofia, as it does not meet BFU's requirements for this stage of the tournament. Initially Septemvri intended to host the match at Arena Tsarsko Selo, Sofia, but the BFU declined their application due to the small capacity of the stadium.); Attendance: 3,500; Referee: Dimo Dimov (Sliven)

13 April 2022 Semifinal 1st leg	Ludogorets Razgrad	2–3	Levski Sofia	Razgrad
19:00 EEST	Despodov 11', (yellow card) 65'; Rick (yellow card) 30'; Nedyalkov (yellow card) 34' (yellow-red card) 80'; Sotiriou (yellow card) 80', (goal) 90+3' (pen.); Delev (yellow card) 90+1'; Plastun (yellow card) 90+8' (yellow-red card) FT; Tissera (yellow card) 90+13'	Report	Krastev (yellow card) 32'; Mihajlović 52'; Bari 57'; Córdoba (yellow card) 78' (yellow-red card) 80'; Tsunami (yellow card) 90+2'; M. Petkov 90+11' (pen.), (yellow card) 90+12'	Stadium: Huvepharma Arena; Attendance: 5,000; Referee: Ivaylo Stoyanov (Petrich)

22 April 2022 Semifinal 2nd leg	Levski Sofia	1–0 (4–2 agg.)	Ludogorets Razgrad	Sofia
19:00 EEST	Welton 3', (yellow card) 82'; Córdoba (yellow card) 54'; Sundberg (yellow card) 89'	Report	Rick (yellow card) 54'; Gonçalves (yellow card) 90+2'	Stadium: Vivacom Arena - Georgi Asparuhov; Attendance: 18,732; Referee: Dragomir Draganov (Varna)

15 May 2022 Final	CSKA Sofia	0–1	Levski Sofia	Sofia
17:00 EEST	Lam (yellow card) 19'; Yomov (yellow card) 64'; Youga (yellow card) 86'; Turitsov (yellow card) 90+2'	Report	Tsunami (yellow card) 23'; Stefanov 57'; Krastev (yellow card) 87'; Mihajlović (yellow card) 90+5'	Stadium: Vasil Levski National Stadium; Attendance: 40,600; Referee: Nikola Popov (Sofia)

== Squad statistics ==
As of 22 May 2022

No.	Pos	Nat	Player	Total		First League		Bulgarian Cup	
No.	Pos	Nat	Player	Apps	Goals	Apps	Goals	Apps	Goals
1	GK	(Bulgaria) BUL	Plamen Andreev	10	0	2+2	0	6	0
4	DF	(Bulgaria) BUL	Ivan Goranov	21	0	18+2	0	1	0
5	DF	(Netherlands) NED	Kellian van der Kaap	16	0	5+7	0	4	0
6	DF	(Brazil) BRA	Wenderson Tsunami	15	1	11	1	4	0
7	MF	(Bulgaria) BUL	Georgi Milanov	28	4	20+3	2	5	2
8	MF	(Bulgaria) BUL	Andrian Kraev	33	2	21+6	2	3+3	0
10	MF	(Bulgaria) BUL	Radoslav Tsonev	25	1	15+7	1	2+1	0
11	MF	(Bulgaria) BUL	Zdravko Dimitrov	23	1	16+4	1	1+2	0
13	GK	(Bulgaria) BUL	Nikolay Mihaylov	29	0	29	0	0	0
14	MF	(Bulgaria) BUL	Iliyan Stefanov	13	5	9+1	4	2+1	1
17	FW	(Brazil) BRA	Welton Felipe	14	3	10	2	4	1
19	FW	(Morocco) MAR	Bilal Bari	36	10	31	6	5	4
20	MF	(Bulgaria) BUL	Dimitar Kostadinov	21	5	6+12	1	3	4
22	DF	(Bulgaria) BUL	Patrick-Gabriel Galchev	22	0	9+10	0	1+2	0
23	DF	(The Gambia) GAM	Noah Sonko Sundberg	15	1	11	1	4	0
27	MF	(Bulgaria) BUL	Asen Mitkov	9	0	1+6	0	0+2	0
30	MF	(Bulgaria) BUL	Filip Krastev	16	3	12	3	4	0
33	DF	(Panama) PAN	José Córdoba	24	0	19+1	0	4	0
71	MF	(Bulgaria) BUL	Antoan Stoyanov	2	0	0+2	0	0	0
88	FW	(Bulgaria) BUL	Marin Petkov	35	6	16+13	4	2+4	2
91	DF	(Switzerland) SUI	Dragan Mihajlović	27	1	21	0	5+1	1
99	GK	(Bulgaria) BUL	Yoan Zagorov	0	0	0	0	0	0
Players away from the club on loan:
	GK	(Bulgaria) BUL	Ivan Andonov	0	0	0	0	0	0
	DF	(Bulgaria) BUL	Denis Dinev	0	0	0	0	0	0
Players who left the club during the season:
1	GK	(Croatia) CRO	Zvonimir Mikulić	0	0	0	0	0	0
3	DF	(North Macedonia) MKD	Gjoko Zajkov	16	1	14	1	2	0
3	DF	(Bulgaria) BUL	Zhivko Atanasov	0	0	0	0	0	0
4	MF	(Bulgaria) BUL	Martin Raynov	0	0	0	0	0	0
5	DF	(Cyprus) CYP	Christos Shelis	13	0	11	0	1+1	0
6	DF	(Bulgaria) BUL	Ivaylo Naydenov	11	0	4+5	0	1+1	0
8	MF	(Bulgaria) BUL	Simeon Slavchev	5	0	5	0	0	0
9	FW	(Bulgaria) BUL	Steven Petkov	0	0	0	0	0	0
10	MF	(Bulgaria) BUL	Borislav Tsonev	20	6	15+3	5	0+2	1
12	GK	(Bulgaria) BUL	Nikolay Krastev	0	0	0	0	0	0
14	DF	(Bulgaria) BUL	Mateo Stamatov	0	0	0	0	0	0
15	DF	(Bulgaria) BUL	Bogdan Kostov	0	0	0	0	0	0
20	DF	(Spain) ESP	Nacho Monsalve	0	0	0	0	0	0
23	DF	(Bulgaria) BUL	Hristofor Hubchev	4	1	3+1	1	0	0
31	DF	(Bulgaria) BUL	Kostadin Iliev	0	0	0	0	0	0
41	DF	(Bulgaria) BUL	Georgi Aleksandrov	9	0	4+4	0	0+1	0
45	FW	(Bulgaria) BUL	Iliya Dimitrov	0	0	0	0	0	0
70	FW	(Bulgaria) BUL	Ivaylo Hristov	0	0	0	0	0	0
77	MF	(Bulgaria) BUL	Iliya Yurukov	0	0	0	0	0	0
79	FW	(Bulgaria) BUL	Martin Petkov	15	1	3+10	1	2	0
86	FW	(Bulgaria) BUL	Valeri Bojinov	2	0	0+2	0	0	0
	GK	(Bulgaria) BUL	Petar Ivanov	0	0	0	0	0	0

=== Disciplinary record ===
Includes all competitive matches.

N	P	Nat.	Name	First League			Bulgarian Cup			Total			Notes
N	P	Nat.	Name	Yellow card	Second yellow card	Red card	Yellow card	Second yellow card	Red card	Yellow card	Second yellow card	Red card	Notes
3	DF	(North Macedonia)	Gjoko Zajkov	1						1			
4	DF	(Bulgaria)	Ivan Goranov	2						2			
5	DF	(Cyprus)	Christos Shelis	3						3			
5	DF	(Netherlands)	Kellian van der Kaap	2						2			
6	DF	(Bulgaria)	Ivaylo Naydenov	1						1			
6	DF	(Brazil)	Wenderson Tsunami	2	1		2			4	1		
8	MF	(Bulgaria)	Andrian Kraev	9			2			11			
7	MF	(Bulgaria)	Georgi Milanov	1			1			2			
10	MF	(Bulgaria)	Borislav Tsonev	5						5			
11	MF	(Bulgaria)	Zdravko Dimitrov	3						3			
14	MF	(Bulgaria)	Iliyan Stefanov	3						3			
17	FW	(Brazil)	Welton Felipe	4			1			5			
19	FW	(Morocco)	Bilal Bari	5						5			
20	MF	(Bulgaria)	Dimitar Kostadinov	1						1			
21	MF	(Bulgaria)	Radoslav Tsonev	7						7			
22	DF	(Bulgaria)	Patrick-Gabriel Galchev	3		1				3		1	
23	DF	(Bulgaria)	Hristofor Hubchev			1						1	
23	DF	(The Gambia)	Noah Sonko Sundberg	1			1			2			
27	MF	(Bulgaria)	Asen Mitkov				1			1			
30	MF	(Bulgaria)	Filip Krastev	2			2			4			
33	DF	(Panama)	José Córdoba	5			2	1		7	1		
41	DF	(Bulgaria)	Georgi Aleksandrov	1						1			
79	FW	(Bulgaria)	Martin Petkov	2						2			
88	FW	(Bulgaria)	Marin Petkov	4			1			5			
91	DF	(Switzerland)	Dragan Mihajlović	4			1			5			

Last updated: 22 May 2022
Source: soccerway
Only competitive matches
(yellow card) = Number of bookings; (second yellow card) = Number of sending offs after a second yellow card; (red card) = Number of sending offs by a direct red card.
