= Filip Krastev =

Bulgarian footballer (born 2001)

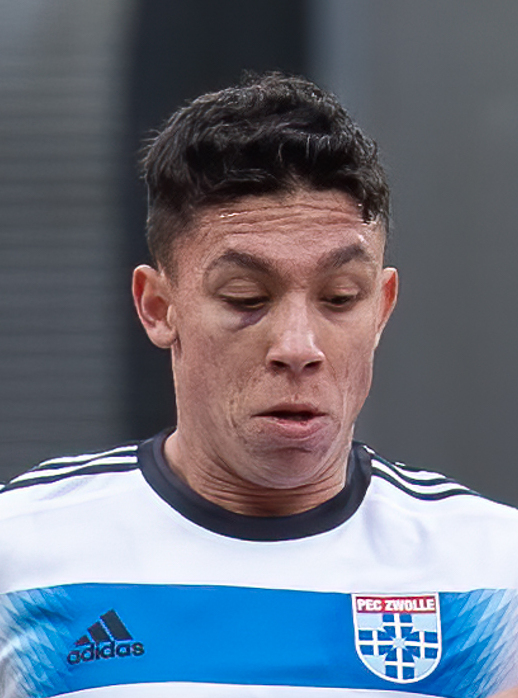
- Krastev with PEC Zwolle in 2024

Personal information
- Full name: Filip Yavorov Krastev
- Date of birth: 15 October 2001 (age 25)
- Place of birth: Sofia, Bulgaria
- Height: 1.79 m (5 ft 10 in)
- Positions: Left winger; attacking midfielder

Team information
- Current team: PEC Zwolle (on loan from Lommel)
- Number: 50

Youth career
- 2010–2020: Slavia Sofia

Senior career*
Years	Team	Apps	(Gls)
2018–2020	Slavia Sofia	30	(3)
2020–	Lommel	0	(0)
2020	→ Slavia Sofia (loan)	14	(1)
2021	→ Troyes (loan)	2	(0)
2021	→ Cambuur (loan)	3	(0)
2022–2023	→ Levski Sofia (loan)	46	(11)
2023–2024	→ Los Angeles FC (loan)	10	(1)
2024–2025	→ Zwolle (loan)	45	(8)
2025–2026	→ Oxford United (loan)	16	(1)
2026	→ Göztepe (loan)	11	(0)
2026–	→ PEC Zwolle (loan)	0	(0)

International career^{‡}
2017–2018	Bulgaria U17	2	(0)
2019–2021	Bulgaria U19	3	(2)
2021–2022	Bulgaria U21	11	(1)
2020–	Bulgaria	30	(4)
- * Club domestic league appearances and goals as of 16 August 2026 ‡ National team caps and goals as of 17:21, 30 March 2026 (UTC)

Filip Yavorov Krastev (Bulgarian: Филип Яворов Кръстев; born 15 October 2001) is a Bulgarian professional footballer who plays as a left winger or attacking midfielder for Eredivisie club PEC Zwolle on loan from Lommel, and the Bulgaria national team.

== Club career ==
=== Slavia Sofia ===
Krastev joined Slavia Sofia's youth academy in 2010. He made his first team debut at the age of 16 years and 210 days in a 3–0 home loss against Lokomotiv Plovdiv on 13 May 2018, coming on as a substitute for Galin Ivanov. Krastev scored his first senior goal on 24 February 2020, netting the second for Slavia during their 3–1 victory against Dunav Ruse. A week later, he provided an assist to Ivaylo Dimitrov in a 2–1 away win over Levski Sofia.

=== Lommel ===
On 18 June 2020, Slavia announced that Krastev would sign for Premier League club Manchester City in the following week; however, on 28 June 2020, Krastev signed with Belgian First Division B team Lommel, part of the City Football Group, which immediately loaned him back to Slavia until the end of 2020.

==== Loans ====
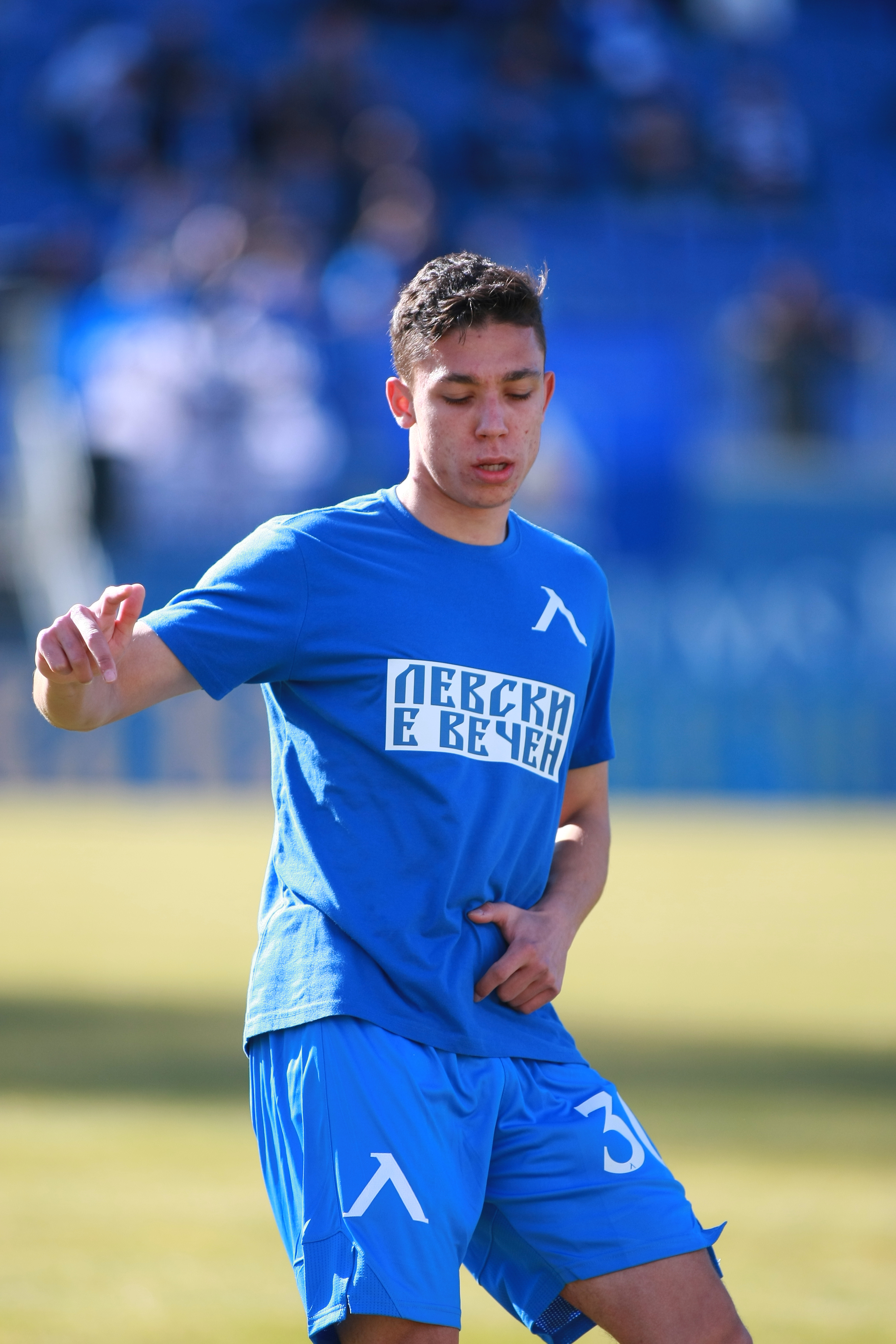
Krastev with Levski Sofia in 2022

On 28 January 2021, Krastev joined another City Football Group side, Troyes, on an 18-month loan deal. On 27 August 2021, his loan deal with Troyes was cut short to allow him to join Eredivisie side Cambuur on a season-long loan deal.

On 27 January 2022, Krastev returned to Bulgaria to sign for Levski Sofia on a six-month loan. On 28 June 2022, his loan was extended for a further year.

On 26 July 2023, Krastev joined Major League Soccer club Los Angeles FC on loan until 30 June 2024, with a permanent transfer option. He made his debut on 8 August in Leagues Cup match against Real Salt Lake, coming as a substitute in the 76th minute and scoring his debut goal in the 84th minute for the 4–0 win.

In January 2024, his loan deal with LAFC was terminated early. He returned to Europe to sign a loan deal with PEC Zwolle on 26 January. He re-signed on loan with PEC Zwolle in July 2024.

On 1 September 2025, Krastev joined EFL Championship club Oxford United on a season-long loan. On 5 February, he was recalled by Lommel. Later that day, he joined Süper Lig side Göztepe on loan until the end of the season with an option to buy.

== International career ==
In August 2020, he received his first call up to the senior side for the UEFA Nations League in September, earning his first cap on 6 September, in a 1–0 away loss against Wales after coming on as a late second-half substitute for Todor Nedelev. On 5 September 2024, he had a good first half performance in the 0:0 away draw with Belarus in a UEFA Nations League match, but was sent off after the break due to receiving a second yellow card.

== Career statistics ==
=== Club ===
As of match played 2 May 2026

Appearances and goals by club, season and competition
Club	Season	League			Cup (Note: Includes Bulgarian Cup, Belgian Cup, Coupe de France, KNVB Cup, FA Cup)		Continental		Other		Total	
Club	Season	Division	Apps	Goals	Apps	Goals	Apps	Goals	Apps	Goals	Apps	Goals
Slavia Sofia	2017–18	First League	1	0	0	0	—		—		1	0
Slavia Sofia	2018–19	First League	13	0	1	0	2	0	1	0	17	0
Slavia Sofia	2019–20	First League	16	3	0	0	—		—		16	3
Slavia Sofia	Total		30	3	1	0	2	0	1	0	34	3
Lommel	2020–21	Challenger Pro League	0	0	0	0	—		—		0	0
Slavia Sofia (loan)	2020–21	First League	14	1	0	0	1	0	—		15	1
Troyes (loan)	2020–21	Ligue 2	2	0	0	0	—		—		2	0
Cambuur (loan)	2021–22	Eredivisie	3	0	2	1	—		—		5	1
Levski Sofia (loan)	2021–22	First League	12	3	4	0	—		—		16	3
Levski Sofia (loan)	2022–23	First League	34	8	1	0	4	1	1	0	40	9
Levski Sofia (loan)	Total		46	11	5	0	4	1	1	0	56	12
Los Angeles FC (loan)	2023	MLS	10	1	—		—		2 (Note: Appearances in Leagues Cup)	1	12	2
PEC Zwolle (loan)	2023–24	Eredivisie	14	2	0	0	—		—		14	2
PEC Zwolle (loan)	2024–25	Eredivisie	31	6	1	0	—		—		32	6
PEC Zwolle (loan)	Total		45	8	1	0	—		—		46	8
Oxford United (loan)	2025–26	Championship	16	1	1	0	—		—		17	1
Göztepe (loan)	2025–26	Süper Lig	11	0	0	0	—		—		11	0
Career total			180	25	7	1	7	1	4	1	194	28

=== International ===
As of match played 30 March 2026

Appearances and goals by national team and year
National team	Year	Apps	Goals
Bulgaria	2020	1	0
Bulgaria	2021	0	0
Bulgaria	2022	7	0
Bulgaria	2023	5	0
Bulgaria	2024	9	1
Bulgaria	2025	6	1
Bulgaria	2026	2	2
Total		30	4

International goals

Bulgaria score listed first, score column indicates score after each Krastev goal

No.	Date	Venue	Opponent	Score	Result	Competition
1	25 March 2024	Tofiq Bahramov Republican Stadium, Baku, Azerbaijan	Azerbaijan	1–0	1–1	2024 FIFA Series
2	18 November 2025	Vasil Levski National Stadium, Sofia, Bulgaria	Georgia	2–0	2–1	2026 FIFA World Cup qualification
3	27 March 2026	Gelora Bung Karno Stadium, Jakarta, Indonesia	Solomon Islands	3–1	10–2	2026 FIFA Series
4	27 March 2026	Gelora Bung Karno Stadium, Jakarta, Indonesia	Solomon Islands	4–1	10–2	2026 FIFA Series

== Honours ==
Levski Sofia

- Bulgarian Cup: 2021–22

Individual

- Eredivisie Player of the Month: January 2025
- Eredivisie Team of the Month: January 2025
