= Patrik-Gabriel Galchev =

Bulgarian footballer (born 2001)

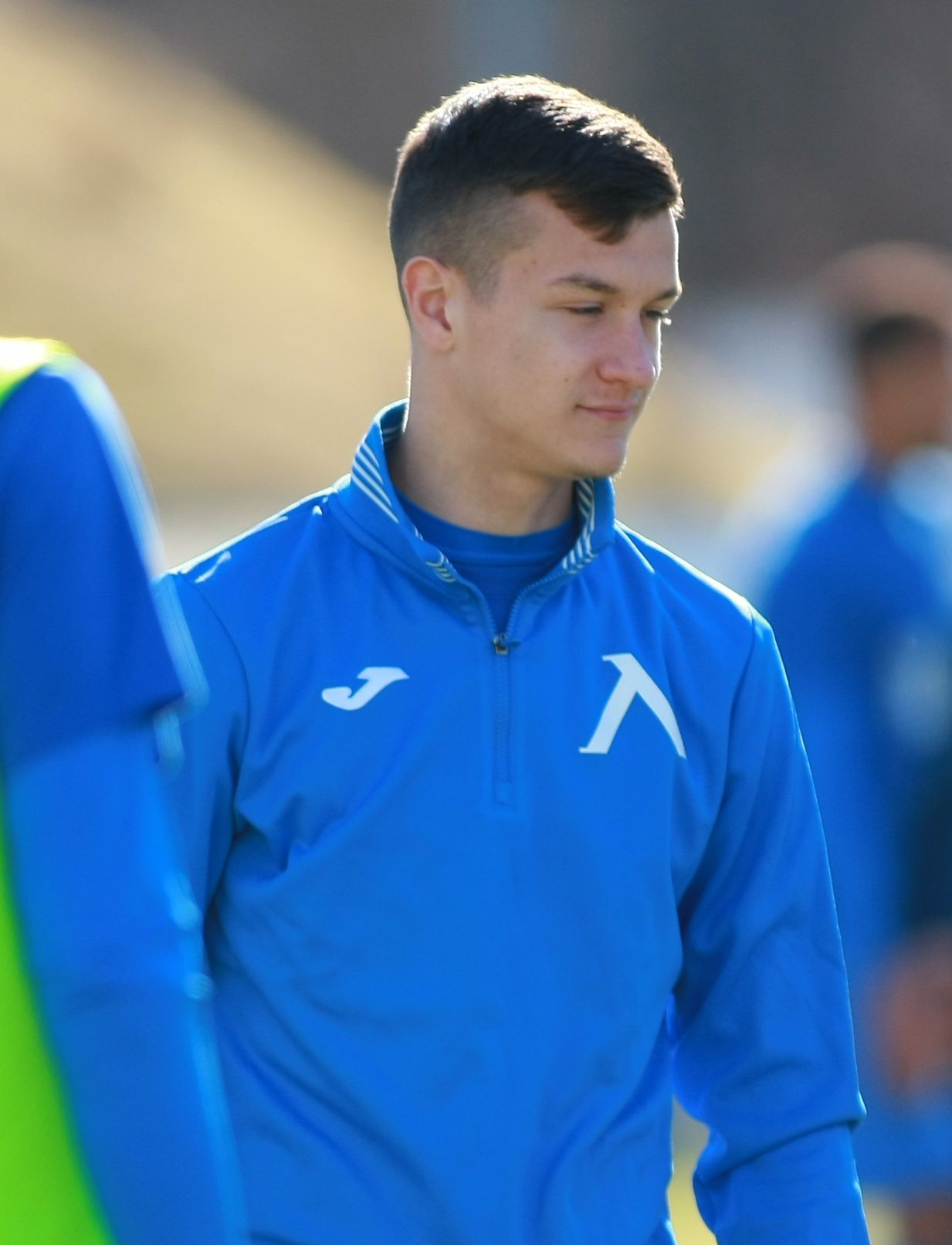
- Galchev warming up for Levski Sofia in 2022

Personal information
- Full name: Patrik-Gabriel Dimitrov Galchev
- Date of birth: 14 April 2001 (age 25)
- Place of birth: Zaragoza, Spain
- Height: 1.78 m (5 ft 10 in)
- Positions: Right-back; winger

Youth career
- 2004–2008: Real Zaragoza
- 2008–2010: Lokomotiv Sofia
- 2010–2015: DIT Sofia
- 2015–2021: Levski Sofia

Senior career*
Years	Team	Apps	(Gls)
2020–2026	Levski Sofia	85	(2)
2025	→ Lokomotiv Sofia (loan)	29	(2)
2026	Željezničar	12	(0)

International career^{‡}
2019	Bulgaria U18	4	(1)
2021–2022	Bulgaria U21	8	(0)
2023–	Bulgaria	8	(0)
- * Club domestic league appearances and goals as of 16 May 2026 ‡ National team caps and goals as of 5 June 2026

Patrik-Gabriel Dimitrov Galchev (Bulgarian: Патрик-Габриел Димитров Галчев; born 14 April 2001) is a professional footballer who plays mainly as a right-back. Born in Spain, he plays for the Bulgaria national team.

== Club career ==
=== Early career ===
Born in Spain to Bulgarian parents, Galchev began playing football at the age of 3. He spent four years at Real Zaragoza before returning to Bulgaria. After periods at Lokomotiv Sofia and DIT Sofia, Galchev signed with the Levski Sofia youth academy, at the age of 14. After impressing with the U-17 and U-19 teams, he spent a trial period at his hometown club Real Zaragoza.

=== Levski Sofia ===
On 19 December 2019, Galchev signed his first professional contract with Levski. He made his first team debut in a 4–1 win against Partizan Cherven Bryag in the Round of 32 of the 2020–21 Bulgarian Cup.

Galchev was loaned out to Lokomotiv Sofia during 2025.

=== Željezničar ===
On 12 February 2026, Galchev signed a one-and-a-half-year contract with Bosnian Premier League club Željezničar. He made his debut for the club in a league game against Velež Mostar on 21 February. Galchev left Željezničar following the end of the 2025–26 season.

== International career ==
Galchev has represented the Bulgaria under-18 national team. On 24 March 2021, he made his debut for the U-21 team in a 2–1 win over Ukraine. On 17 June 2023, he made his debut for the senior team in a 1–1 away draw against Lithuania.

== Career statistics ==
=== Club ===
As of match played 16 May 2026

Appearances and goals by club, season and competition
Club	Season	League			Cup		Continental		Other		Total	
Club	Season	Division	Apps	Goals	Apps	Goals	Apps	Goals	Apps	Goals	Apps	Goals
Levski Sofia	2020–21	Bulgarian First League	16	0	1	0	—		—		17	0
Levski Sofia	2021–22	Bulgarian First League	19	0	3	0	—		—		22	0
Levski Sofia	2022–23	Bulgarian First League	15	1	2	0	3	0	0	0	20	1
Levski Sofia	2023–24	Bulgarian First League	25	1	2	0	3	0	—		30	1
Levski Sofia	2024–25	Bulgarian First League	10	0	1	0	—		—		11	0
Levski Sofia	Total		85	2	9	0	6	0	0	0	100	2
Lokomotiv Sofia (loan)	2024–25	Bulgarian First League	14	1	—		—		—		14	1
Lokomotiv Sofia (loan)	2025–26	Bulgarian First League	15	1	2	1	—		—		17	2
Lokomotiv Sofia (loan)	Total		29	2	2	1	—		—		31	3
Željezničar	2025–26	Bosnian Premier League	12	0	2	0	—		—		14	0
Career total			126	4	13	1	6	0	0	0	145	5

=== International ===
As of match played 5 June 2026

Appearances and goals by national team and year
National team	Year	Apps	Goals
Bulgaria	2023	4	0
Bulgaria	2024	2	0
Bulgaria	2026	2	0
Total		8	0

== Honours ==
Levski Sofia

- Bulgarian Cup: 2021–22
