= Christos Sielis =

Cypriot footballer

Personal information
- Full name: Christos Sielis
- Date of birth: 2 February 2000 (age 26)
- Place of birth: Paphos, Cyprus
- Height: 1.86 m (6 ft 1 in)
- Position: Centre-back

Team information
- Current team: OFI
- Number: 16

Youth career
- Arsenal
- −2017: Grimsby Town
- 2017−2019: Shrewsbury Town

Senior career*
Years	Team	Apps	(Gls)
2017–2019	Shrewsbury Town	0	(0)
2018	→ Halesowen Town (loan)	2	(0)
2019–2021	APOEL	29	(0)
2021	Levski Sofia	11	(0)
2022–2024	Volos	58	(2)
2024–2026	Panetolikos	56	(0)
2026–	OFI	1	(0)

International career^{‡}
2016–2017	Cyprus U17	10	(0)
2018–2019	Cyprus U19	12	(0)
2019–2022	Cyprus U21	13	(1)
2020–	Cyprus	15	(0)
- * Club domestic league appearances and goals as of 23 August 2026 ‡ National team caps and goals as of 13:00, 7 June 2026 (UTC)

Christos Sielis (Greek: Χρίστος Σιέλης; born 2 February 2000) is a Cypriot professional footballer who plays as a centre-back for Greek Super League club OFI and the Cyprus national team.

== Early career ==
Sielis was born in Paphos, Cyprus. He joined the Arsenal academy in Greece as a youngster, before moving to London and subsequently joining the youth set-up at Grimsby Town. He was signed to the Shrewsbury Town youth academy towards the end of the 2016–17 season on the recommendation of former Grimsby manager Paul Hurst. Sielis is also listed by AF Global Football as one of the graduates of its academy programme.

== Club career ==
=== Shrewsbury Town ===
Sielis travelled with the Shrewsbury Town first-team squad to a training camp in Portugal, and featured regularly during the 2017–18 pre-season. Whilst still a second year scholar, he signed a two-year professional contract with the club on 3 October 2017, and made his professional debut on the same day against West Bromwich Albion U21s in an EFL Trophy group-stage match. In the same competition on 7 November at home to local rivals Walsall, he made a last-minute error that allowed the opponents to score the only goal of the game. He was supported by captain Mat Sadler in the aftermath.

=== Halesowen Town ===
On 21 September 2018, Sielis was loaned for a month to Halesowen Town in the Southern Football League Premier Division Central. He played five total games during his time in Worcestershire, and scored his first career goal from a long-distance run in a 3–0 win over Wolverhampton Wanderers in the Birmingham Senior Cup.

=== APOEL ===
Sielis was released by Shrewsbury in May 2019. On 5 June, he signed for APOEL back in his native Cyprus, on a three-year contract.

=== Levski Sofia ===
After rescinding his contract with APOEL, Sielis signed a two-year deal with Bulgarian powerhouse Levski Sofia.

=== Volos ===
Following a managerial change at Levski Sofia, Sielis rescinded his contract with the Bulgarian club in January 2022. He then joined the Greek side Volos

== International career ==
Sielis has represented Cyprus at under-17, under-19 and under-21 level. He made his senior debut in a friendly against the Czech Republic on 7 October 2020.

== Personal life ==
Sielis has two older brothers, Giorgos and Valentinos, who are also footballers.

== Career statistics ==
=== Club ===
As of match played 8 July 2023

Appearances and goals by club, season and competition
Club	Season	League			National cup (Note: Includes FA Cup, Cypriot Cup, Bulgarian Cup, Greek Football Cup)		Europe		Other		Total	
Club	Season	Division	Apps	Goals	Apps	Goals	Apps	Goals	Apps	Goals	Apps	Goals
Shrewsbury Town	2017–18	League One	0	0	0	0	—		2 (Note: Appearances in EFL Trophy)	0	2	0
Shrewsbury Town	2018–19	League One	0	0	0	0	—		1	0	1	0
Shrewsbury Town	Total		0	0	0	0	—		3	0	3	0
Halesowen Town (loan)	2018–19	SFL Premier Division Central	2	0	1	0	—		2 (Note: One appearance in FA Trophy, one appearance and one goal in Birmingham Senior Cup)	1	5	1
APOEL	2019–20	Cypriot First Division	3	0	2	0	—		—		5	0
APOEL	2020–21	Cypriot First Division	26	0	1	0	3 (Note: Appearances in UEFA Europa League)	0	—		30	0
APOEL	Total		29	0	3	0	3	0	—		35	0
Levski Sofia	2021–22	Bulgarian First League	11	0	2	0	—		—		13	0
Volos	2021–22	Super League Greece	7	0	—		—		—		7	0
Volos	2022–23	Super League Greece	28	0	2	0	—		—		30	0
Volos	Total		35	0	2	0	—		—		37	0
Career total			76	0	8	0	3	0	5	1	93	1

=== International ===
As of match played 7 June 2026

Appearances and goals by national team and year
National team	Year	Apps	Goals
Cyprus	2020	4	0
Cyprus	2021	0	0
Cyprus	2022	1	0
Cyprus	2023	0	0
Cyprus	2024	0	0
Cyprus	2025	7	0
Cyprus	2026	3	0
Total		15	0

== Honours ==
=== OFI ===
- Greek Super Cup: 2026
