= Zdravko Dimitrov =

Bulgarian footballer

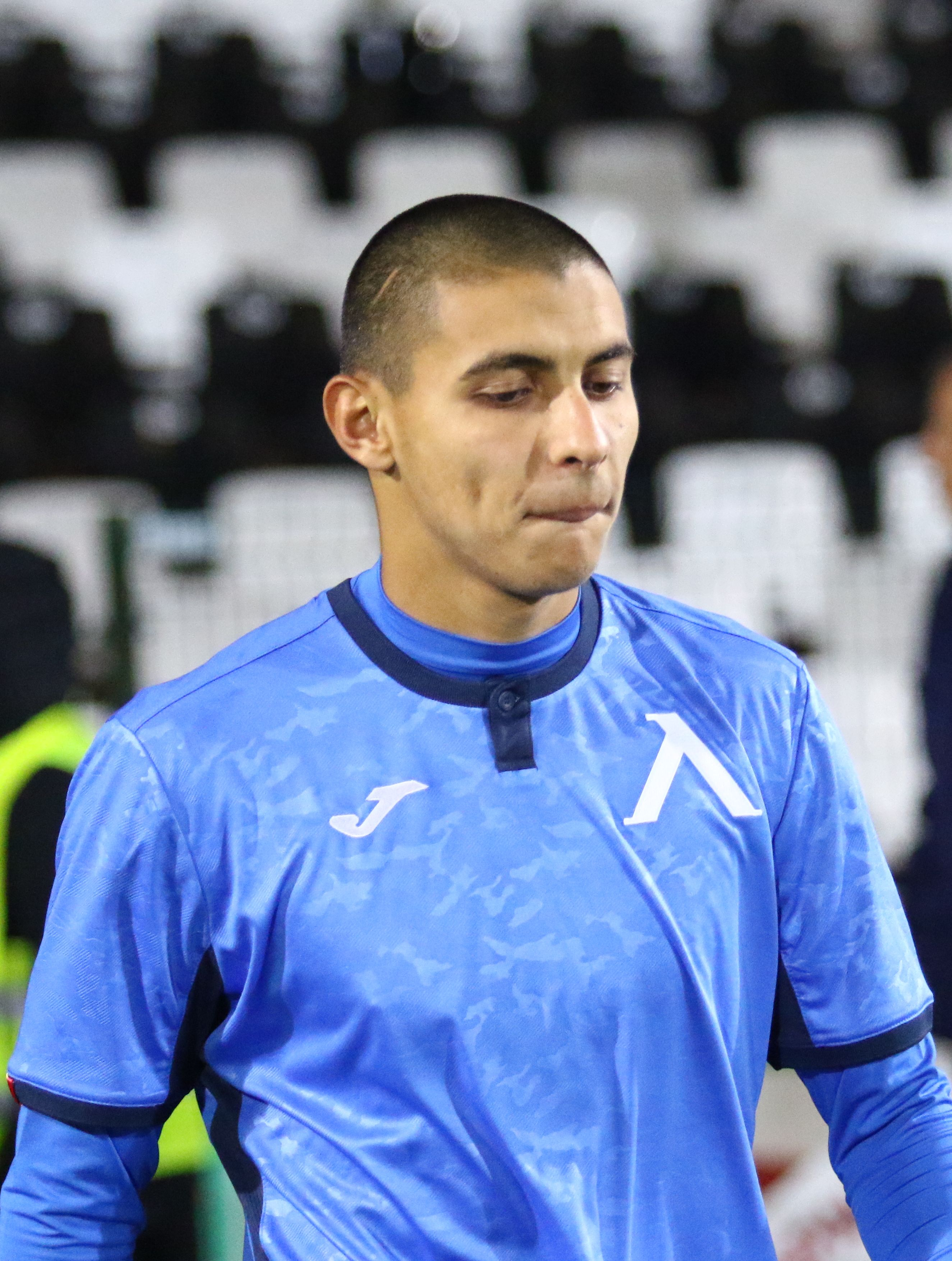
- Dimitrov with Levski in 2020

Personal information
- Full name: Zdravko Minchev Dimitrov
- Date of birth: 24 August 1998 (age 28)
- Place of birth: Bankya, Bulgaria
- Height: 1.80 m (5 ft 11 in)
- Position: Left winger

Team information
- Current team: Mardin 1969
- Number: 10

Senior career*
Years	Team	Apps	(Gls)
2016–2019	Septemvri Sofia	38	(3)
2017	→ Botev Vratsa (loan)	0	(0)
2017–2018	→ Lokomotiv Sofia (loan)	23	(1)
2019–2024	Levski Sofia	58	(2)
2022	→ Spartak Varna (loan)	11	(1)
2023	→ Sakaryaspor (loan)	16	(1)
2023–2024	→ Septemvri Sofia (loan)	17	(1)
2024	→ Sakaryaspor (loan)	18	(2)
2024–2026	Bodrum	51	(5)
2026	Amedspor	16	(0)
2026–	Mardin 1969	14	(3)

International career^{‡}
2017	Bulgaria U19	1	(0)
2019–2020	Bulgaria U21	11	(1)
2020–	Bulgaria	14	(0)
- * Club domestic league appearances and goals as of 8 November 2026 ‡ National team caps and goals as of 3 October 2026

Zdravko Minchev Dimitrov (Bulgarian: Здравко Минчев Димитров; born 24 August 1998) is a Bulgarian professional footballer who plays as a left winger for TFF 1. Lig club Mardin 1969.

== Career ==
In July 2017, Dimitrov was loaned to Botev Vratsa. He was named on the bench for three Botev's games in the Second League, but he did not make an appearance in either match. He was recalled by his parent club after spending a month in Vratsa.

On 3 September 2017, Dimitrov joined Lokomotiv Sofia on loan until the end of the season.

=== Levski Sofia ===
He became part of Levski Sofia in the summer of 2019. He made his debut on 11 June in the Europa League qualification win against Ružomberok substituting Iliya Yurukov in the 89th minute. He scored his first goal for Levski on 14 February 2021 in the 2–0 win against Montana. Receiving good pass from Nigel Robertha, dribbling past one opposite defender he netted the first goal of the game in the 14th minute. Upon the return of Stanimir Stoilov as head coach of Levski in September 2021, Dimitrov was sidelined on his position as left-winger by new signing Welton. In March 2022, Dimitrov along with fellow team-mate Dimitar Kostadinov were excluded from the squad by manager Stoilov due to disciplinary issues, later identified as gambling addiction.

==== loans ====
Six months after Dimitrov's suspension from the first team squad of Levski, the player joined newly promoted side Spartak Varna on a one-year loan deal.

=== Bodrum ===
In July 2024, after loans at Sakaryaspor in TFF First League, he was transferred to newly promoted to Süper Lig team Bodrum. On 20 August he scored his debut goal for the club which also turned to be the first ever goal of the team in the Super Lig.

== International career ==
Dimitrov made his debut for the Bulgarian under-21 team on 22 March 2019 in the starting eleven for the friendly against Northern Ireland U21. He netted his first goal on 13 October 2020, opening the scoring in the 1:1 away draw with Poland U21. Dimitrov earned his first cap for the senior national team on 11 November 2020, coming on as a substitute for Georgi Yomov during the second half of the 3:0 win over Gibraltar in a friendly match. He was once again called up in August 2024, being selected by manager Ilian Iliev for the September UEFA Nations League matches against Belarus and Northern Ireland.

== Honours ==
=== Club ===
Levski Sofia

- Bulgarian Cup (1): 2021–22

== Career statistics ==
=== Club ===
As of 28 February 2021

Club performance			League		Cup		Continental		Other		Total	
Club	League	Season	Apps	Goals	Apps	Goals	Apps	Goals	Apps	Goals	Apps	Goals
Bulgaria			League		Bulgarian Cup		Europe		Other (Note: Includes Bulgarian Supercup matches.)		Total	
Septemvri Sofia	Second League	2016–17	12	2	1	0	–		–		13	2
Botev Vratsa (loan)	Second League	2017–18	0	0	0	0	–		–		0	0
Lokomotiv Sofia (loan)	Second League	2017–18	23	1	2	0	–		1 (Note: Promotion play-offs)	1	26	2
Septemvri Sofia	First League	2018–19	26	1	5	0	–		3 (Note: Relegation play-offs)	1	34	2
Septemvri Sofia	Total		38	3	6	0	0	0	3	1	47	4
Levski Sofia	First League	2019–20	11	0	2	0	4	0	–		17	0
Levski Sofia	First League	2020–21	15	1	1	1	–		–		16	2
Levski Sofia	Total		26	1	3	1	4	0	0	0	33	2
Career statistics			71	5	9	1	0	0	4	2	84	8
