= Antoan Stoyanov =

Bulgarian footballer (born 2005)

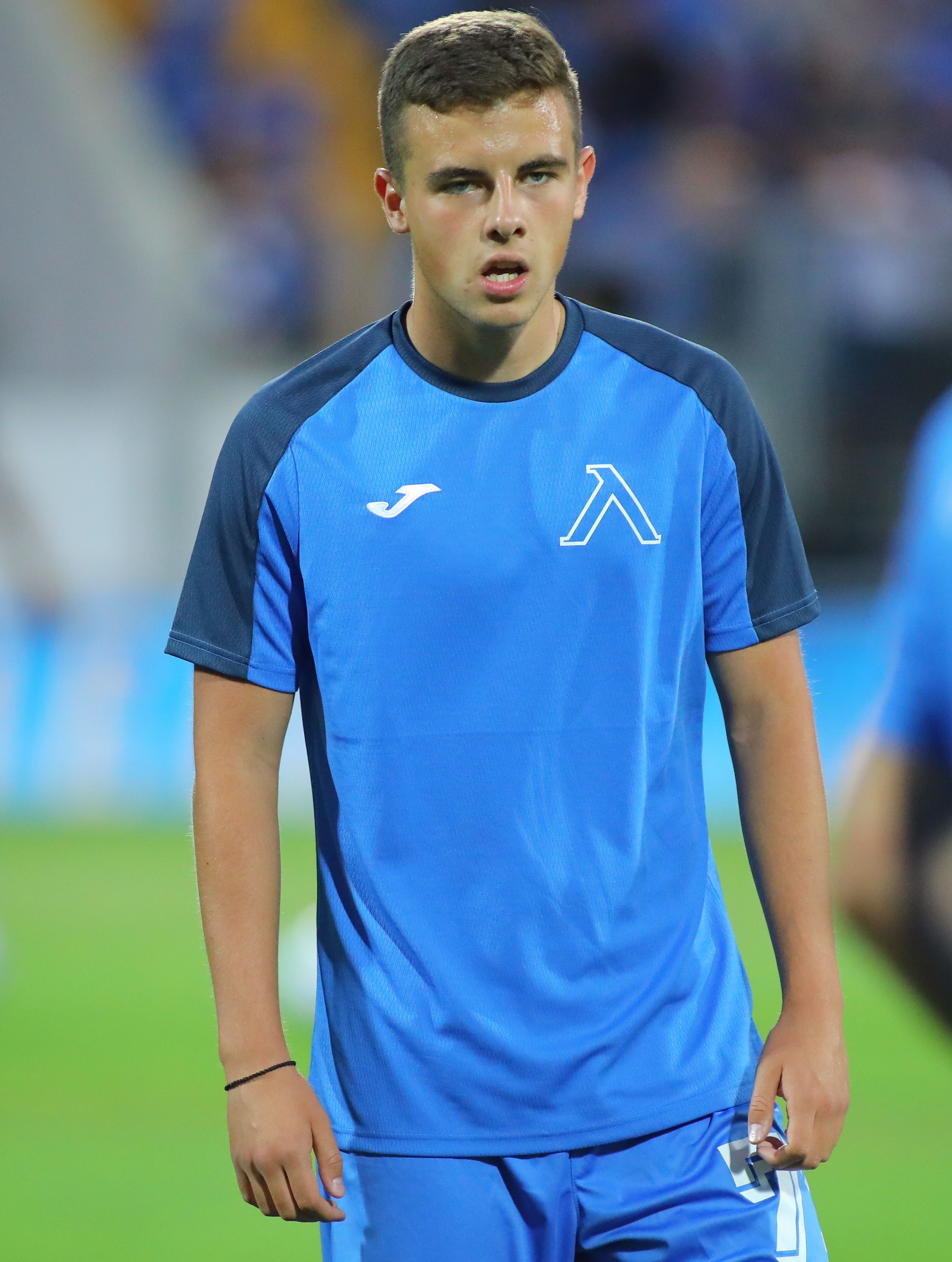
- Stoyanov with Levski

Personal information
- Full name: Antoan Stoyanov Stoyanov
- Date of birth: 17 January 2005 (age 21)
- Place of birth: Kyustendil, Bulgaria
- Height: 1.80 m (5 ft 11 in)
- Position: Midfielder

Team information
- Current team: Botev Vratsa
- Number: 8

Youth career
- 2016–2025: Levski Sofia

Senior career*
| Years | Team | Apps | (Gls) |
| 2021–2025 | Levski Sofia | 2 | (0) |
| 2022–2025 | Levski Sofia II | 29 | (6) |
| 2023–2024 | → Empoli (loan) | 0 | (0) |
| 2024–2025 | → Botev Vratsa (loan) | 24 | (1) |
| 2025– | Botev Vratsa | 36 | (2) |

International career^{‡}
| 2021–2022 | Bulgaria U17 | 13 | (1) |
| 2022–2023 | Bulgaria U19 | 10 | (1) |
| 2024– | Bulgaria U21 | 7 | (0) |
- * Club domestic league appearances and goals as of 11 June 2026 ‡ National team caps and goals as of 08:59, 6 September 2025 (UTC)

Antoan Stoyanov Stoyanov (Bulgarian: Антоан Стоянов Стоянов; born 17 January 2005) is a Bulgarian professional footballer who plays as a midfielder for Botev Vratsa.

== Career ==
On 2 August 2023, Stoyanov joined Italian Serie A club Empoli on a season-long loan deal with the option to buy, initially joining up with the club's Primavera Youth Team.

== Career statistics ==
=== Club ===
As of 29 May 2025

| Club | Season | League | | | Cup | | Continental | | Other | | Total | |
| Club | Season | Division | Apps | Goals | Apps | Goals | Apps | Goals | Apps | Goals | Apps | Goals |
|---|---|---|---|---|---|---|---|---|---|---|---|---|
| Levski Sofia | 2021–22 | First League | 2 | 0 | 0 | 0 | – | | – | | 2 | 0 |
| Levski Sofia | 2022–23 | First League | 0 | 0 | 0 | 0 | 0 | 0 | – | | 0 | 0 |
| Levski Sofia | Total | | 2 | 0 | 0 | 0 | 0 | 0 | 0 | 0 | 2 | 0 |
| Empoli U20 (loan) | 2023–24 | Campionato Primavera 1 | 11 | 0 | 1 | 0 | – | | – | | 12 | 0 |
| Empoli U18 (loan) | 2023–24 | Campionato Under 18 | 3 | 0 | – | | – | | – | | 3 | 0 |
| Botev Vratsa (loan) | 2024–25 | First League | 24 | 1 | 3 | 0 | – | | 1 | 0 | 28 | 1 |
| Career total | | | 40 | 1 | 4 | 0 | 0 | 0 | 1 | 0 | 45 | 1 |

== Honours ==
=== Club ===
Levski Sofia

- Bulgarian Cup (1): 2021–22
