= Bilal Bari =

Moroccan footballer (born 1998)

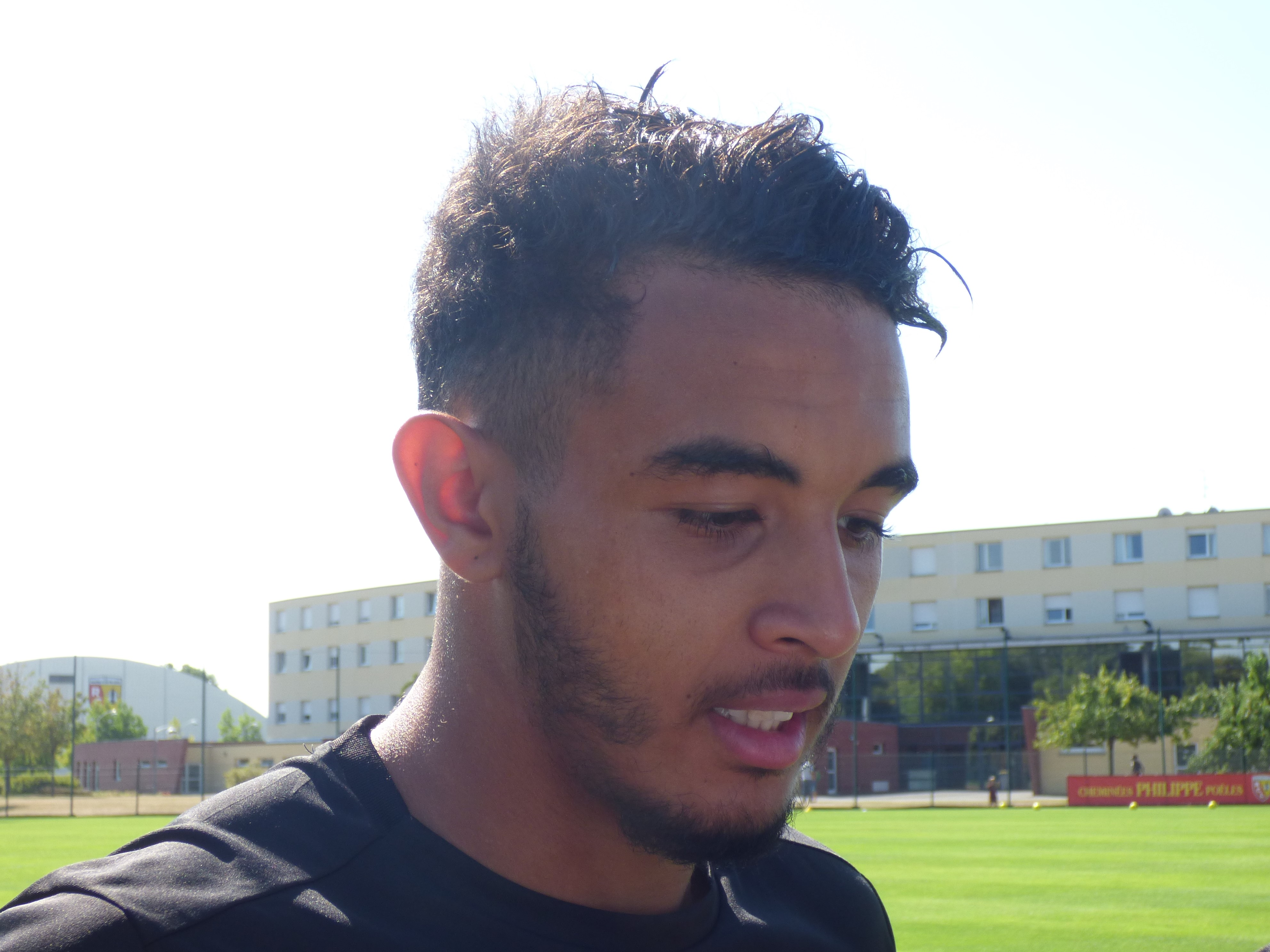
- Bari in 2018

Personal information
- Date of birth: 19 January 1998 (age 28)
- Place of birth: Lens, France
- Height: 1.84 m (6 ft 0 in)
- Position: Forward

Youth career
- 2005–2008: Montigny-en-Gohelle
- 2008–2018: Lens

Senior career*
Years	Team	Apps	(Gls)
2015–2019	Lens B	57	(16)
2018–2019	Lens	1	(0)
2018–2019	→ RS Berkane (loan)	10	(1)
2019–2020	Concordia Chiajna	22	(2)
2020–2021	Montana	12	(3)
2021–2024	Levski Sofia	58	(8)
Total		160	(30)

International career
2017	Morocco U20	5	(0)
2018	Morocco U23	1	(0)
- * Club domestic league appearances and goals as of 17:47, 22 May 2024 (UTC)

Bilal Bari (born 19 January 1998) is a former professional footballer who played as a striker and now football agent. Born in France, he has represented Morocco at youth international levels (under-20 and under-23).

== Club career ==
On 23 May 2018, Bari signed his first professional contract with his childhood club Lens. Bari made his professional debut with Lens in a 2–0 Ligue 2 win over Orléans on 27 July 2018. On 27 August he was loaned out at RS Berkane, playing one season for them in the Moroccan Botola. In the summer of 2019 he signed with the Romanian Concordia Chiajna. He played 22 games and scored 2 goals for The Eagles in the Romanian second tier division.

On 2 September 2019, he signed with the Bulgarian elite FC Montana. After playing just half season with the Northwest Bulgarian team he was signed by one of the country's major teams - Levski Sofia. He made his league debut for the Blues on 21 February 2021 against Etar. By the end of the season he appeared in eight more games, but he was not able to net a single goal. He scored his first goal for Levski on 16 October the same year against Lokomotiv Sofia, netting the second goal in a 2–1 away win. By the end of the half season he played eight more league games (playing the full match each time) and scored four more goals, some of them crucial. Furthermore, he was the outfield player who played the most minutes during the first half season for Levski, starting each game and being substituted in only two of them. He also scored a hat-trick in the 2021–22 Bulgarian Cup round of 16 game against Septemvri Simitli. He retired in July 2024, at the age of just 26, because of injuries.

== International career ==
Born in France, Bari is of Moroccan descent. He represented the Morocco U20 in their victorious campaign in the 2017 Jeux de la Francophonie. He debuted for the Morocco U23s in a 1–0 friendly loss to the Senegal U23 on 24 March 2018.

== Career statistics ==
=== Club ===
As of 22 May 2024

Appearances and goals by club, season and competition
Club	Season	League			Cup		Continental		Other		Total	
Club	Season	Division	Apps	Goals	Apps	Goals	Apps	Goals	Apps	Goals	Apps	Goals
Lens B	2015–16	National 2	5	1	0	0	–		0	0	5	1
Lens B	2016–17	National 2	25	2	0	0	–		0	0	25	2
Lens B	2017–18	National 2	27	13	0	0	–		0	0	27	13
Lens B	Total		57	16	0	0	0	0	0	0	57	16
Lens	2016–17	Ligue 2	0	0	1	0	–		0	0	1	0
Lens	2018–19	Ligue 2	1	0	1	0	–		0	0	2	0
Lens	Total		1	0	2	0	0	0	0	0	3	0
RS Berkane (loan)	2018–19	Botola	10	1	0	0	5	0	0	0	15	1
Concordia Chiajna	2019–20	Liga II	22	2	1	1	–		0	0	23	3
Montana	2020–21	Bulgarian First League	12	3	1	0	–		0	0	13	3
Levski Sofia	2020–21	Bulgarian First League	15	0	1	0	–		0	0	16	0
Levski Sofia	2021–22	Bulgarian First League	31	6	5	4	–		0	0	36	10
Levski Sofia	2022–23	Bulgarian First League	6	2	1	0	4	1	0	0	11	3
Levski Sofia	2023–24	Bulgarian First League	6	0	0	0	0	0	0	0	6	0
Levski Sofia	Total		58	8	7	4	4	1	0	0	69	13
Career total			160	30	11	5	9	1	0	0	182	36

== Honours ==
Morocco U20

- Jeux de la Francophonie: 2017

Levski Sofia

- Bulgarian Cup: 2021–22

Individual

- Bulgarian First League Goal of the Week: 2021–22 (Week 11) v. Lokomotiv Sofia
