= Dimitar Kostadinov =

Bulgarian footballer

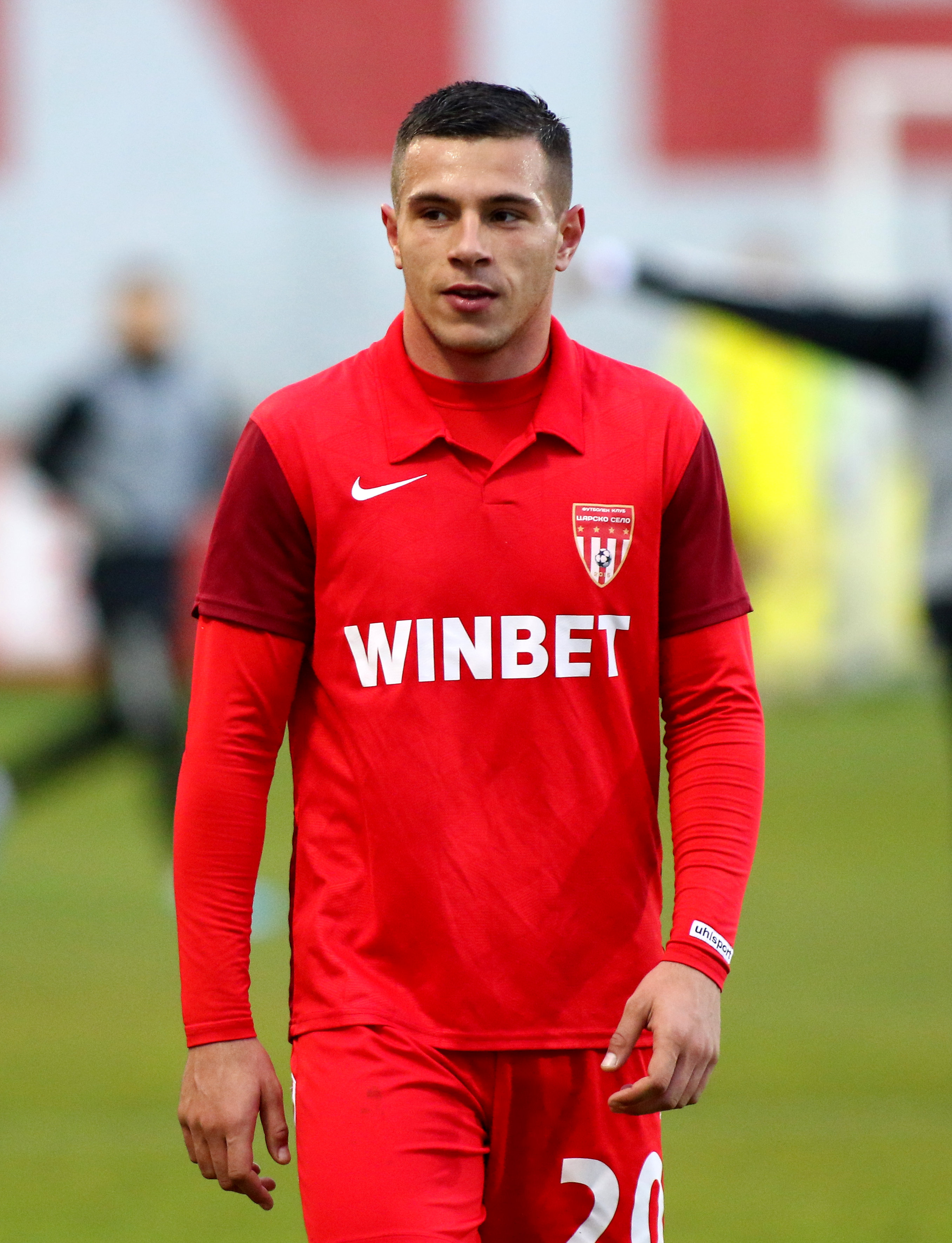

Personal information
- Full name: Dimitar Miroslavov Kostadinov
- Date of birth: 14 August 1999 (age 27)
- Place of birth: Burgas, Bulgaria
- Height: 1.72 m (5 ft 7 1/2 in)
- Position: Attacking midfielder

Team information
- Current team: Lokomotiv Sofia
- Number: 20

Youth career
- 2009–2013: Chernomorets Burgas
- 2013–2015: DIT Sport
- 2015–2018: Septemvri Sofia

Senior career*
Years	Team	Apps	(Gls)
2017–2021	Septemvri Sofia	29	(7)
2019–2020	→ Neftochimic (loan)	10	(3)
2021	→ Tsarsko Selo (loan)	14	(5)
2021–2022	Levski Sofia	18	(1)
2022–2024	Septemvri Sofia	48	(8)
2024	→ Crotone (loan)	10	(0)
2024–2025	Crotone	4	(1)
2025	→ Clodiense (loan)	10	(0)
2025–2026	Chernomorets 1919	29	(11)
2026–	Lokomotiv Sofia	9	(2)

International career
2015–2016	Bulgaria U17	5	(1)
2017–2018	Bulgaria U19	8	(0)
- * Club domestic league appearances and goals as of 18:27, 17 September 2026 (UTC)

Dimitar Kostadinov (Bulgarian: Димитър Костадинов; born 14 August 1999) is a Bulgarian professional footballer who plays as an attacking midfielder for First League club Lokomotiv Sofia.

== Career ==
=== Septemvri Sofia ===
In the summer of 2017 Kostadinov was promoted to the first team of Septemvri Sofia. Spending the first two rounds on the bench, he made his debut in the third round league match against Slavia Sofia. On 24 April 2018 he scored his first goal for the team in a league match against Lokomotiv Plovdiv.

=== Levski Sofia ===
In September 2021, Kostadinov joined Levski Sofia as the first signing of new manager Stanimir Stoilov. In the following months Kostadinov enjoyed a regular starting place in Stoilov's starting eleven. He was particularly prolific in the Bulgarian Cup competition scoring four goals in three games, thus helping his team reach the semi-finals of the tournament. In March 2022, however, Kostadinov along with team-mate Zdravko Dimitrov were suspended from the first team due to disciplinary issues, later identified as gambling "addiction".

=== Septemvri Sofia ===
In the summer of 2022, Kostadinov terminated his contract with Levski after his suspension from the first team. He then returned to his former side Septemvri Sofia.

=== Crotone ===
On 1 February 2024, Kostadinov joined Crotone in Italian Serie C on loan with an option to buy.

== International career ==
=== Youth levels ===
Kostadinov made his debut for the Bulgaria U19 team on 12 September 2017 in a match against Bosnia and Herzegovina U19.

=== Senior level ===
After his good plays for Tsarsko Selo, Kostadinov received his first call up for the national team on 14 May 2021 for the friendly games against Slovakia, Russia and France between 1 June and 8 June.

== Career statistics ==
=== Club ===
As of 22 May 2022

Club performance			League		Cup		Continental		Other		Total	
Club	League	Season	Apps	Goals	Apps	Goals	Apps	Goals	Apps	Goals	Apps	Goals
Bulgaria			League		Bulgarian Cup		Europe		Other		Total	
Septemvri Sofia	First League	2017–18	13	1	2	0	–		–		15	1
Septemvri Sofia	First League	2018–19	6	0	3	1	–		–		9	1
Septemvri Sofia	Second League	2019–20	0	0	0	0	–		1 (Note: Relegation Play-offs)	0	1	0
Septemvri Sofia	Second League	2020–21	10	6	0	0	–		–		10	6
Septemvri Sofia	Total		29	7	5	1	0	0	1	0	35	8
Neftochimic (loan)	Second League	2019–20	10	3	0	0	–		–		10	3
Tsarsko Selo (loan)	First League	2020–21	14	5	0	0	–		–		14	5
Levski Sofia	First League	2021–22	18	1	3	4	–		–		21	5
Career statistics			71	16	8	5	0	0	1	0	80	21

== Honours ==
=== Club ===
Levski Sofia

- Bulgarian Cup (1): 2021–22
