= Yevhen Serdyuk =

Ukrainian footballer

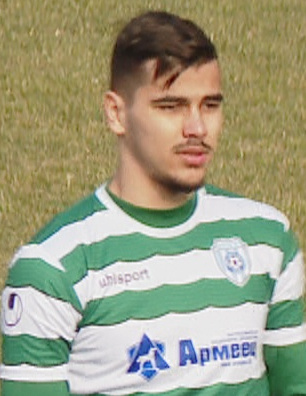

Personal information
- Full name: Yevhen Ihorovych Serdyuk
- Date of birth: 24 April 1998 (age 28)
- Place of birth: Druzhkivka, Ukraine
- Height: 1.85 m (6 ft 1 in)
- Position: Forward

Team information
- Current team: Hong Linh Ha Tinh
- Number: 10

Youth career
- 2008: Biomed Kyiv
- 2009–2010: Obolon Kyiv
- 2010–2011: Zmina Kyiv
- 2011–2013: Youth Sportive School Druzhkivka
- 2013–2016: Monolit Kyiv
- 2016–2017: Fátima

Senior career*
| Years | Team | Apps | (Gls) |
| 2017–2019 | Fátima | 28 | (14) |
| 2019–2021 | Boavista | 0 | (0) |
| 2019–2020 | → Casa Pia (loan) | 12 | (3) |
| 2021–2022 | Cherno More | 26 | (15) |
| 2022–2025 | CSKA 1948 | 55 | (15) |
| 2023 | CSKA 1948 II | 2 | (1) |
| 2025– | Hong Linh Ha Tinh | 3 | (0) |

International career
| 2019 | Ukraine U21 | 2 | (0) |
- * Club domestic league appearances and goals as of 7 February 2025

Yevhen Ihorovych Serdyuk (Ukrainian: Євген Ігорович Сердюк; born 24 April 1998), commonly known as Jeka, is a Ukrainian professional footballer who plays as a forward for V.League 1 club Hong Linh Ha Tinh.

== Career ==
Serdyuk spent 4 years of his career as a player in Portugal.

On 7 September 2021, he joined Cherno More Varna in Bulgaria. A year later Serdyuk signed with CSKA 1948. On 1 August 2024, he scored an equalizing goal during the extra time period of the second leg against Montenegrin team Budućnost Podgorica in a UEFA Conference League qualifying match, allowing CSKA 1948 to advance to the next round, which also marked the first time it eliminated an opponent in a European club tournament.

== Career statistics ==
=== Club ===
As of 14 May 2025.

| Club | Season | League | | | National Cup | | League Cup | | Europe | | Other | | Total | |
| Club | Season | Division | Apps | Goals | Apps | Goals | Apps | Goals | Apps | Goals | Apps | Goals | Apps | Goals |
|---|---|---|---|---|---|---|---|---|---|---|---|---|---|---|
| Fátima | 2017–18 | Campeonato de Portugal | 16 | 6 | 3 (Note: Appearances in the Taça de Portugal) | 1 | – | | – | | – | | 19 | 7 |
| Fátima | 2018–19 | Campeonato de Portugal | 12 | 8 | 3 | 1 | – | | – | | – | | 15 | 9 |
| Fátima | Total | | 28 | 14 | 6 | 2 | 0 | 0 | 0 | 0 | 0 | 0 | 34 | 16 |
| Boavista | 2018–19 | Primeira Liga | 0 | 0 | 0 | 0 | – | | – | | – | | 0 | 0 |
| Boavista | 2019–20 | Primeira Liga | 0 | 0 | 0 | 0 | – | | – | | – | | 0 | 0 |
| Boavista | 2020–21 | Primeira Liga | 0 | 0 | 0 | 0 | – | | – | | – | | 0 | 0 |
| Boavista | Total | | 0 | 0 | 0 | 0 | 0 | 0 | 0 | 0 | 0 | 0 | 0 | 0 |
| Casa Pia (loan) | 2019–20 | LigaPro | 12 | 3 | 0 | 0 | 3 (Note: Appearances in the Taça da Liga) | 0 | – | | – | | 15 | 3 |
| Cherno More | 2021–22 | First League | 20 | 12 | 0 | 0 | – | | – | | – | | 20 | 12 |
| Cherno More | 2022–23 | First League | 5 | 3 | 0 | 0 | – | | – | | – | | 5 | 3 |
| Cherno More | Total | | 25 | 15 | 0 | 0 | 0 | 0 | 0 | 0 | 0 | 0 | 25 | 15 |
| CSKA 1948 | 2022–23 | First League | 16 | 6 | 3 | 3 | – | | – | | – | | 19 | 9 |
| CSKA 1948 | 2023–24 | First League | 12 | 1 | 1 | 0 | – | | – | | 1 | 0 | 14 | 1 |
| CSKA 1948 | 2024–25 | First League | 27 | 8 | 1 | 0 | – | | 3 | 1 | – | | 31 | 9 |
| CSKA 1948 | Total | | 55 | 15 | 5 | 3 | 0 | 0 | 3 | 1 | 1 | 0 | 64 | 19 |
| CSKA 1948 II | 2022–23 | Second League | 1 | 0 | – | | – | | – | | – | | 1 | 0 |
| CSKA 1948 II | 2024–25 | Second League | 1 | 1 | – | | – | | – | | – | | 1 | 1 |
| CSKA 1948 II | Total | | 2 | 1 | 0 | 0 | 0 | 0 | 0 | 0 | 0 | 0 | 2 | 1 |
| Career total | | | 122 | 49 | 11 | 5 | 3 | 0 | 3 | 1 | 1 | 0 | 140 | 54 |
