= Celso Raposo =

Portuguese footballer

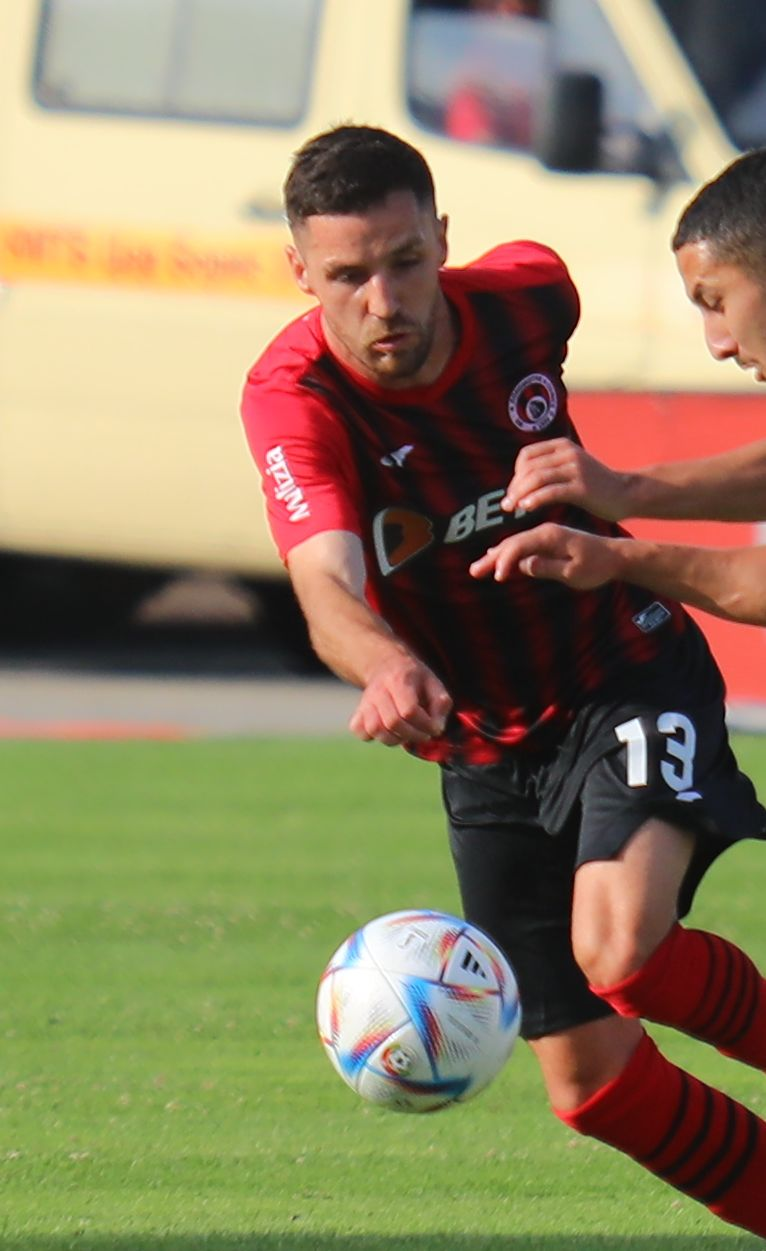

Personal information
- Full name: Celso Daniel Caeiro Raposo
- Date of birth: 3 April 1996 (age 30)
- Place of birth: Barreiro, Portugal
- Height: 1.80 m (5 ft 11 in)
- Position: Right-back

Team information
- Current team: Mafra
- Number: 13

Youth career
- 2004–2007: Moitense
- 2007–2008: Sporting
- 2008–2009: Fabril Barreiro
- 2009–2015: Barreirense

Senior career*
Years	Team	Apps	(Gls)
2015–2016	Alginet		
2016–2017	Tomelloso	1	(0)
2017	Quintanar del Rey	5	(0)
2017–2018	Fabril Barreiro		
2018	Almancilense	10	(0)
2018–2019	Praiense	20	(0)
2019–2020	Cova da Piedade	10	(0)
2020–2021	Pinhalnovense	14	(1)
2021	Vestri	6	(0)
2021–2023	Lokomotiv Sofia	60	(3)
2023	Kalamata	9	(0)
2024–2025	Lokomotiv Sofia	42	(0)
2025–	Mafra	23	(0)
- * Club domestic league appearances and goals as of 7 May 2026

Celso Daniel Caeiro Raposo (born 3 April 1996) is a Portuguese professional footballer who plays as a right-back for Liga 3 club Mafra.

== Career ==
He made his Taça da Liga debut for Cova da Piedade on 28 July 2019 in a game against Leixões. In July 2021, Raposo signed a two-year contract with Bulgarian club Lokomotiv Sofia.
