= Dragan Mihajlović =

Swiss footballer (born 1991)

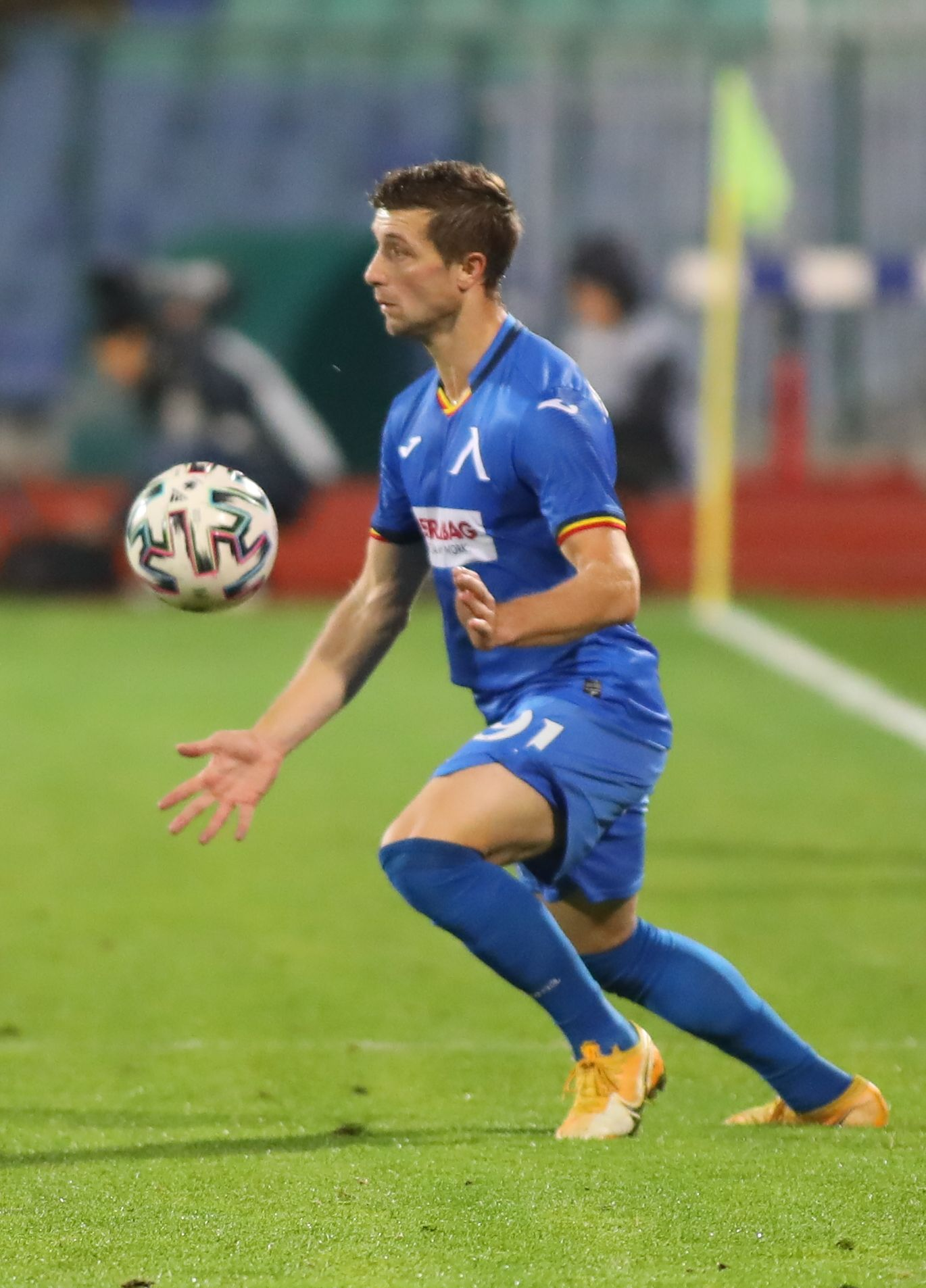

Personal information
- Date of birth: 22 August 1991 (age 35)
- Place of birth: Loznica, SFR Yugoslavia
- Height: 1.77 m (5 ft 10 in)
- Positions: Right back; defensive midfielder; winger

Team information
- Current team: Bellinzona
- Number: 91

Youth career
- –2009: Bellinzona
- 2009–2010: Parma

Senior career*
Years	Team	Apps	(Gls)
2008–2013	Bellinzona	76	(2)
2013–2016	Chiasso	111	(13)
2016–2019	Lugano	91	(3)
2019–2021	APOEL	21	(2)
2021–2022	Levski Sofia	34	(0)
2022–	Bellinzona	120	(6)

International career^{‡}
2009	Switzerland U19	4	(1)
2010–2011	Switzerland U20	5	(1)
- * Club domestic league appearances and goals as of 30 September 2026 ‡ National team caps and goals as of 26 November 2015

Dragan Mihajlović (born 22 August 1991) is a Swiss professional footballer who plays primarily as a right back for Bellinzona.

== Club career ==
Mihajlović started his career at Bellinzona, in the Italian speaking region of Switzerland. He played his first league match on 26 April 2008, in a 3–0 win to Yverdon, replacing Angelo Raso. He also played the next 2 Challenge League matches as substitute. In the last match of 2008–09 Super League season, Mihajlović made his full Super League debut, substituting Adewale Wahab in the 58th minute. He played the first four out of five league matches as substitute for Bellinzona at the start of 2009–10 season.

A few days after his 18th birthday, on 31 August, Parma, who had recently returned to Serie A, signed him on a permanent deal. After just one season in the Parma primavera team, the 18-year-old Swiss forward moved back to AC Bellinzona on 3 June 2010, signing a 3-year contract.

=== Levski Sofia ===
On 12 February 2021, he signed for Bulgarian club Levski Sofia. Mihajlović immediately became a fixture in Levski's starting eleven as a right back and kept his spot for a year until the end of 2021-22 season. His high point at Levski was unquestionably winning the 2021–22 Bulgarian Cup. Mihajlović had a major contribution to the trophy, especially by scoring against Ludogorets Razgrad in the first leg of the semi-final. At the end of the season, Mihajlović and Levski could not reach an agreement for a contract extension and the player left the team.

== International ==
He scored a goal in 2010 UEFA European Under-19 Football Championship qualification. He made his U19 debut on 2 September 2009, a first leg of a two-leg friendly with Georgia national under-19 football team.

== Honours ==
=== Club ===
APOEL

- Cypriot Super Cup (1): 2019

Levski Sofia

- Bulgarian Cup (1): 2021–22
