= Gjoko Zajkov =

Macedonian footballer

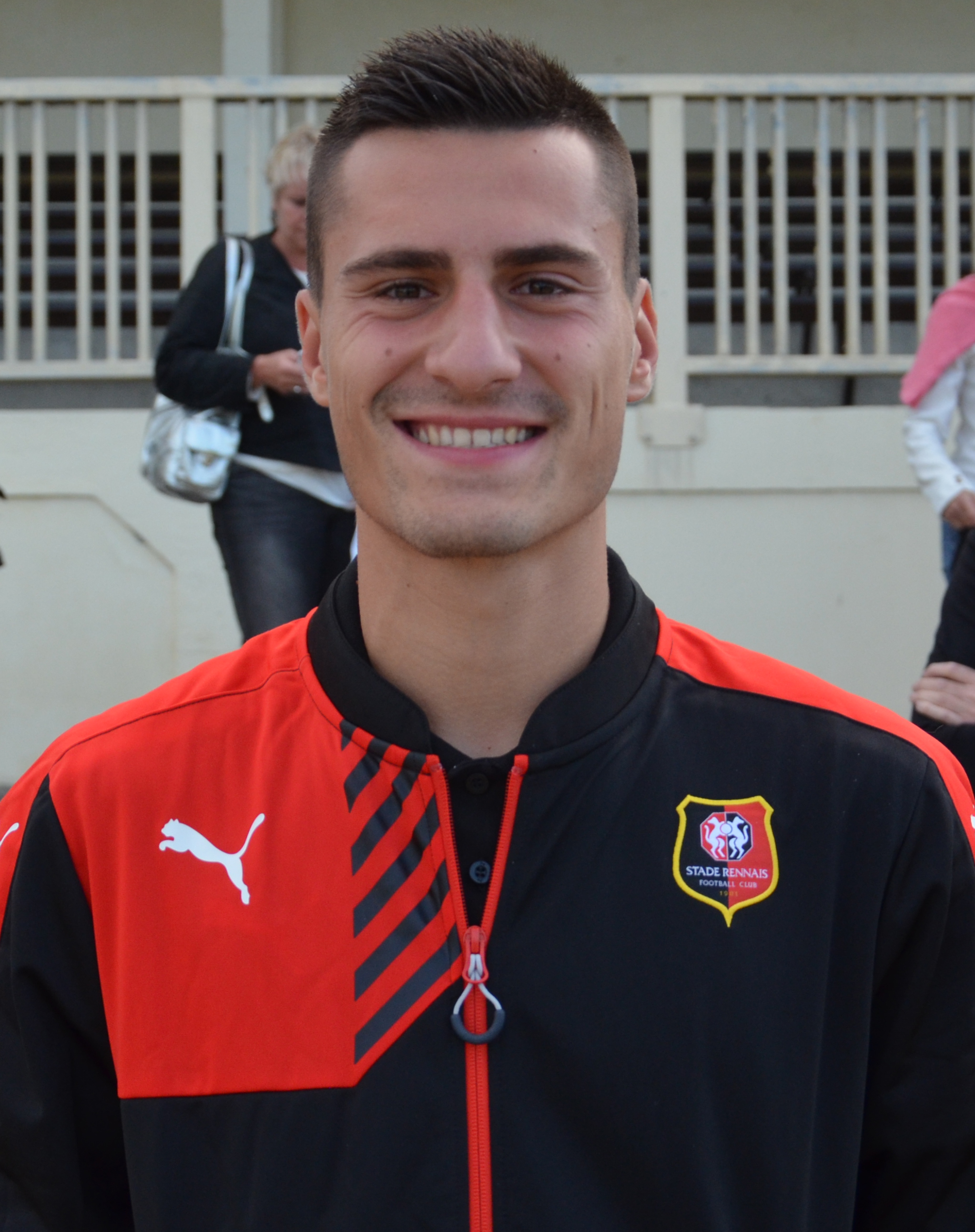
- Zajkov with Rennes in 2015

Personal information
- Date of birth: 10 February 1995 (age 31)
- Place of birth: Skopje, Macedonia
- Height: 1.87 m (6 ft 1 1/2 in)
- Position: Centre back

Team information
- Current team: Ajman
- Number: 5

Youth career
- 2003–2012: Rabotnički

Senior career*
Years	Team	Apps	(Gls)
2012–2014	Rabotnički	51	(3)
2014–2016	Rennes	0	(0)
2014–2016	Rennes B	15	(0)
2015–2016	→ Charleroi (loan)	7	(0)
2016–2021	Charleroi	25	(0)
2021–2022	Levski Sofia	14	(1)
2022–2023	Vorskla Poltava	14	(0)
2022	→ Slavia Sofia (loan)	6	(1)
2023–2025	Universitatea Craiova	59	(1)
2025–	Ajman	5	(0)

International career^{‡}
2011–2012	Macedonia U17	8	(1)
2012–2013	Macedonia U18	2	(0)
2012–2013	Macedonia U19	10	(1)
2014	Macedonia U20	1	(0)
2013–2017	Macedonia U21	21	(1)
2016–	North Macedonia	49	(1)
- * Club domestic league appearances and goals as of 15:27, 29 September 2025 (UTC) ‡ National team caps and goals as of 16:56, 8 October 2026 (UTC)

Gjoko Zajkov (Macedonian: Ѓоко Зајков; born 10 February 1995) is a Macedonian professional footballer who plays as a centre back for UAE Pro League club Ajman and for the North Macedonia national team.

== Early career ==
Zajkov began his football career with FK Rabotnički.

== Club career ==
Born in Skopje into a family originally from Udovo, Gjoko Zajkov was playing in Macedonia for the youth team of Rabotnichki, until the summer in 2012 when he made his first appearance for the senior team of the club, competing in the Macedonian First League. He was voted best defender that year, at the age of 17.

On 23 June 2014 he left Macedonia for the French club Stade Rennais F.C., with whom he signed a three-year contract. After his first season in France, where he spent the majority of the time playing for the youth team of Rennais only, in the summer of 2015 he was loaned for one year to Charleroi in Belgium.

After being released from Charleroi, Zajkov signed a one-year deal with Levski Sofia in August 2021. In March 2022 he joined Slavia Sofia until the end of the season.

In January 2023 he signed for Universitatea Craiova.

== International career ==
He has been a member of Macedonian U-19 and U-21 national teams.

He made his senior debut for Macedonia in a June 2016 friendly match against Iran and has, as of May 2020, earned a total of 12 caps, scoring no goals.

He represented the nation at UEFA Euro 2020, their first major tournament.

== Career statistics ==
=== Club ===
As of match played 17 May 2025

Appearances and goals by club, season and competition
Club	Season	League			National cup (Note: Includes Macedonian Cup, Belgian Cup, Bulgarian Cup, Cupa României)		Continental		Other		Total	
Club	Season	Division	Apps	Goals	Apps	Goals	Apps	Goals	Apps	Goals	Apps	Goals
Rabotnički	2011–12	1. MFL	4	0	0	0	0	0	—		4	0
Rabotnički	2012–13	1. MFL	20	2	0	0	—		—		20	2
Rabotnički	2013–14	1. MFL	27	1	3	0	—		—		30	1
Rabotnički	Total		51	3	3	0	0	0	—		54	3
Rennes	2014–15	Ligue 1	0	0	0	0	—		1 (Note: Appearances in Coupe de la Ligue)	0	1	0
Rennes B	2014–15	CFA2	15	0	—		—		—		15	0
Charleroi (loan)	2015–16	Belgian Pro League	7	0	1	0	—		—		8	0
Charleroi	2016–17	Belgian First Division A	1	0	2	0	—		—		3	0
Charleroi	2017–18	Belgian First Division A	11	0	2	0	—		—		13	0
Charleroi	2018–19	Belgian First Division A	12	0	0	0	—		—		12	0
Charleroi	2019–20	Belgian First Division A	1	0	1	0	—		—		2	0
Charleroi	2020–21	Belgian First Division A	0	0	0	0	0	0	—		0	0
Charleroi	Total		32	0	6	0	0	0	—		38	0
Levski Sofia	2021–22	First Professional Football League	14	1	2	0	—		—		16	1
Slavia Sofia (loan)	2021–22	First Professional Football League	6	1	2	0	—		—		8	1
Vorskla Poltava	2022–23	Ukrainian Premier League	14	0	0	0	2 (Note: Appearances in UEFA Conference League)	0	—		14	0
Universitatea Craiova	2022–23	Liga I	16	0	—		—		—		16	0
Universitatea Craiova	2023–24	Liga I	23	0	0	0	—		1 (Note: Appearance in Liga I play-offs for UEFA Europa Conference League)	0	24	0
Universitatea Craiova	2024–25	Liga I	20	1	3	0	2	0	—		25	1
Universitatea Craiova	Total		59	1	3	0	2	0	1	0	65	1
Ajman	2025–26	UAE Pro League	0	0	0	0	—		0	0	0	0
Career total			191	6	16	0	4	0	2	0	213	6

=== International ===
As of match played 7 September 2025

Appearances and goals by national team and year
National team	Year	Apps	Goals
North Macedonia	2016	1	0
North Macedonia	2017	4	0
North Macedonia	2018	4	0
North Macedonia	2019	3	0
North Macedonia	2020	5	1
North Macedonia	2021	2	0
North Macedonia	2022	3	0
North Macedonia	2023	5	0
North Macedonia	2024	7	0
North Macedonia	2025	5	0
Total		39	1

As of match played 11 October 2020. North Macedonia score listed first, score column indicates score after each Zajkov goal.

List of international goals scored by Gjoko Zajkov
No.	Date	Venue	Cap	Opponent	Score	Result	Competition
1	11 October 2020	A. Le Coq Arena, Tallinn, Estonia	13	Estonia	3–3	3–3	2020–21 UEFA Nations League

== Honours ==
Rabotnički

- 1. MFL: 2013–14
- Macedonian Football Cup: 2013–14
