= 2021–22 Bulgarian Cup =

Sesame Купа на България

Tournament details
- Country: Bulgaria
- Teams: 47

Final positions
- Champions: Levski Sofia (26th title)
- Runners-up: CSKA Sofia

Tournament statistics
- Matches played: 48
- Goals scored: 121 (2.52 per match)
- Top goal scorer(s): (Ecuador) Jordy Caicedo (5 goals)
- All statistics correct as of 15 May 2022.

The 2021–22 Bulgarian Cup was the 40th official edition of the Bulgarian annual football knockout tournament. It was sponsored by Sesame and known as the Sesame Kupa na Bulgaria for sponsorship purposes. The competition began on 4 September 2021 with the preliminary round and finished with the final on 15 May 2022. CSKA Sofia were the defending cup winners. They reached the final for 3rd consecutive time, but lost to Levski Sofia, who won the cup for a record 26th time and also qualified for the second qualifying round of the 2022–23 UEFA Europa Conference League.

== Participating clubs ==
The following 47 teams qualified for the competition:

2021–22 First League; 14 clubs	2021–22 Second League; 17 non-reserve clubs	Winners of 4 regional competitions 16 clubs
Arda Kardzhali; Beroe Stara Zagora; Botev Plovdiv; Botev Vratsa; CSKA 1948 Sofia; CSKA Sofia; Cherno More Varna; Levski Sofia; Lokomotiv Plovdiv; Lokomotiv Sofia; Ludogorets Razgrad; Pirin Blagoevgrad; Slavia Sofia; Tsarsko Selo Sofia	Dobrudzha Dobrich; Etar Veliko Tarnovo; Hebar Pazardzhik; Levski Lom; Litex Lovech; Marek Dupnitsa; Maritsa Plovdiv; Minyor Pernik; Montana; Neftochimic Burgas; Septemvri Simitli; Septemvri Sofia; Sozopol; Spartak Varna; Sportist Svoge; Strumska Slava Radomir; Yantra Gabrovo	from North-East zone: Chernolomets Popovo; Chernomorets Balchik; Dunav Ruse; Septemvri Tervel; from North-West zone: Lokomotiv Gorna Oryahovitsa; Lokomotiv Mezdra; Partizan Cherven Bryag; Sevlievo; from South-West zone: Balkan Botevgrad; Bansko; Nadezhda Dobroslavtsi; Vitosha Bistritsa; from South-East zone: Rozova Dolina Kazanlak; Krumovgrad; Rodopa Smolyan; Yambol

== Matches ==
=== Preliminary round ===
The draw was conducted on 27 August 2021. The games were played between 4 and 8 September 2021. In this stage participated 16 winners from the regional amateur competitions and 17 non-reserve teams from Second League. During the draw, Rozova Dolina Kazanlak, Septemvri Simitli and Septemvri Sofia received a bye to the Round of 32.

4 September 2021	Dunav Ruse (III)	1−1 (a.e.t.) (2−4 p)	Maritsa Plovdiv (II)	Ruse
16:00 UTC+3	Dimitrov 60'	Report	Tonev 17'	Stadium: Gradski stadion Referee: Martin Velikov (Varna)
	Penalties
	Dimov (penalty missed); Valchev (penalty scored); Dochev (penalty scored); Hasan (penalty missed)		(penalty scored) Tonev; (penalty missed) Marchev; (penalty scored) Angelov; (penalty scored) Pramatarov; (penalty scored) Nikolov

4 September 2021	Chernomorets Balchik (III)	0−2	Minyor Pernik (II)	Balchik
17:00 UTC+3		Report	Valchanov 68'; Kostov 87'	Stadium: Stadion Balchik; Referee: Mihael Pavlov (Veliko Tarnovo)

7 September 2021	Nadezhda Dobroslavtsi (III)	0−3	Spartak Varna (II)	Dobroslavtsi
16:00 UTC+3		Report	Stefanov 30'; Penev 35'; Kolev 74'	Stadium: Stadion Nadezhda; Referee: Ivan Ivanov (Sofia)

7 September 2021	Septemvri Tervel (III)	0−0 (a.e.t.) (4−1 p)	Yantra Gabrovo (II)	Tervel
16:00 UTC+3		Report		Stadium: Stadion Septemvri; Referee: Kaloyan Tsvetkov (Varna)
	Penalties
	Yusnyu (penalty scored); Kadir (penalty scored); Stefanov (penalty scored); Peshkov (penalty scored)		(penalty missed) Gadzhev; (penalty missed) Kazakov; (penalty scored) Gadzhalov

7 September 2021	Vitosha Bistritsa (III)	1−4 (a.e.t.)	Hebar Pazardzhik (II)	Bistritsa
17:00 UTC+3	Vachev 75'	Report	Petkov 65', 108'; Tartov 92'; Todorov 97'	Stadium: Stadion Bistritsa; Referee: Blagoy Manov (Blagoevgrad)

7 September 2021	Yambol (III)	1−0	Strumska Slava Radomir (II)	Yambol
16:00 UTC+3	Dimitrov 10'	Report		Stadium: Stadion Nikolay Laskov; Referee: Kristiyan Kolev (Plovdiv)

7 September 2021	Lokomotiv Gorna Oryahovitsa (III)	2−1 (a.e.t.)	Neftochimic Burgas (II)	Gorna Oryahovitsa
19:00 UTC+3	Tsachev 3'; Kolev 96'	Report	Stefanov 75'	Stadium: Stadion Lokomotiv; Referee: Vasil Minev (Sofia)

8 September 2021	Balkan Botevgrad (III)	0−0 (a.e.t.) (4−5 p)	Etar Veliko Tarnovo (II)	Botevgrad
16:00 UTC+3		Report		Stadium: Stadion Hristo Botev; Referee: Dimitar Burov (Sofia)
	Penalties
	Tsvetkov (penalty scored); Kolev (penalty missed); Petkov (penalty scored); Bonev (penalty scored); Yordanov (penalty scored); Kovachev (penalty missed)		(penalty scored) Knežević; (penalty scored) Iliev; (penalty scored) Apostolov; (penalty missed) Femia; (penalty scored) Dichev; (penalty scored) Ivanov

8 September 2021	Bansko (III)	3−1	Sozopol (II)	Bansko
16:00 UTC+3	Hazurov 9'; Angelov 38'; Lefterov 88'	Report	Gyuzelev 85'	Stadium: Stadion Sveti Petar; Referee: Hristiyana Guteva (Sofia)

8 September 2021	Chernolomets Popovo (III)	0−3	Marek Dupnitsa (II)	Popovo
16:00 UTC+3		Report	Dimitrov 27'; E. Iliev 62', 89'	Stadium: Stadion Stamo Kostov; Referee: Krasimir Krastev (Shumen)

8 September 2021	Krumovgrad (III)	1−0	Litex Lovech (II)	Krumovgrad
16:00 UTC+3	Karadayi 56'	Report		Stadium: Sporten kompleks Krumovgrad; Referee: Nedelcho Gadzhalov (Plovdiv)

8 September 2021	Lokomotiv Mezdra (III)	1−3	Montana (II)	Mezdra
16:00 UTC+3	Matados 60'	Report	Foudil 6'; Karachorov 78'; Manoliou 85'	Stadium: Stadion Lokomotiv; Referee: Nikola Petrov (Lovech)

8 September 2021	Partizan Cherven Bryag (III)	0−4	Levski Lom (II)	Cherven Bryag
16:00 UTC+3		Report	Ognyanov 38'; Gushterov 50'; Georgiev 75'; Tsekov 89'	Stadium: Gradski stadion Referee: Ventsislav Mitrev (Sofia)

8 September 2021	Rodopa Smolyan (III)	0−0 (a.e.t.) (4−2 p)	Dobrudzha Dobrich (II)	Smolyan
16:00 UTC+3		Report		Stadium: Stadion Septemvri; Referee: Martin Markov (Sofia)
	Penalties
	Stefanov (penalty scored); Kovachev (penalty scored); Kisyov (penalty scored); Tihomirov (penalty scored)		(penalty missed) Abushev; (penalty scored) Tom; (penalty missed) Zlatkov; (penalty scored) Dimov

8 September 2021	Sevlievo (III)	0−1	Sportist Svoge (II)	Sevlievo
16:00 UTC+3		Report	Slavkov 31'	Stadium: Stadion Rakovski; Referee: Stefan Gurkov (Sliven)

=== Round of 32 ===
The draw was conducted on 27 August 2021. The games were played between 21 and 23 September 2021. In this stage participated the 15 winners from the first round, the three byes, as well as the 14 teams from First League.

21 September 2021	Rodopa Smolyan (III)	0−4	Lokomotiv Plovdiv (I)	Smolyan
15:45 UTC+3		Report	Minchev 5' (pen.), 19', 64'; Marcel 44'	Stadium: Stadion Septemvri; Attendance: 500; Referee: Dimo Dimov (Sliven)

21 September 2021	Krumovgrad (III)	1−0 (a.e.t.)	Tsarsko Selo Sofia (I)	Krumovgrad
16:00 UTC+3	Slivov 111'	Report		Stadium: Sporten kompleks Krumovgrad; Referee: Nedelcho Gadzhalov (Plovdiv)

21 September 2021	Rozova Dolina Kazanlak (III)	0−6	Beroe Stara Zagora (I)	Kazanlak
16:00 UTC+3		Report	Enchev 19'; Dinkov 23'; Genov 36'; Camara 52' (pen.), 68'; Yusein 76'	Stadium: Stadion Sevtopolis; Referee: Valentin Zhelezov (Burgas)

21 September 2021	Yambol (III)	0−3	Arda Kardzhali (I)	Yambol
16:00 UTC+3		Report	Kokonov 25' (pen.); Delev 47'; Yordanov 80'	Stadium: Stadion Nikolay Laskov; Referee: Kristiyan Kolev (Plovdiv)

21 September 2021	Montana (II)	1−0	CSKA 1948 Sofia (I)	Montana
18:00 UTC+3	Karachorov 60'	Report		Stadium: Stadion Ogosta; Referee: Dimitar Dimitrov (Sofia)

21 September 2021	Etar Veliko Tarnovo (II)	1−0 (a.e.t.)	Botev Plovdiv (I)	Veliko Tarnovo
18:45 UTC+3	Mladenov 92'	Report		Stadium: Stadion Ivaylo; Attendance: 600; Referee: Dimitar Burov (Sofia)

22 September 2021	Marek Dupnitsa (II)	0−2	Levski Sofia (I)	Dupnitsa
13:00 UTC+3		Report	Kostadinov 12', 32'	Stadium: Stadion Bonchuk; Attendance: 3,000; Referee: Georgi Ginchev (Veliko Tarnovo)

22 September 2021	Bansko (III)	1−2	Pirin Blagoevgrad (I)	Bansko
16:00 UTC+3	Mitsanski 28'	Report	Yordanov 42', 57'	Stadium: Stadion Sveti Petar; Referee: Vasil Minev (Sofia)

22 September 2021	Septemvri Tervel (III)	0−1	Septemvri Simitli (II)	Tervel
16:00 UTC+3		Report	Kaloyanov 4'	Stadium: Stadion Septemvri; Referee: Krasimir Krastev (Shumen)

22 September 2021	Sportist Svoge (II)	0−1	Septemvri Sofia (II)	Svoge
16:00 UTC+3		Report	Peshov 76'	Stadium: Stadion Chavdar Tsvetkov; Referee: Stanimir Trenchev (Sofia)

22 September 2021	Hebar Pazardzhik (II)	0−3	CSKA Sofia (I)	Sofia (Note: Hebar plays their first round home match at Stadion Balgarska Armia, Sofia, instead of their regular stadium Stadion Georgi Benkovski in Pazardzhik, which was not in optimal condition to host a football match.)
18:00 UTC+3		Report	Caicedo 25', 41'; Ahmedov 27'	Stadium: Stadion Balgarska Armia; Attendance: 1,000; Referee: Vladimir Valkov (Plovdiv)

23 September 2021	Minyor Pernik (II)	0−2	Cherno More Varna (I)	Pernik
13:00 UTC+3		Report	Velev 7'; Gomes 17'	Stadium: Stadion Minyor; Attendance: 450; Referee: Georgi Ivanov (Sofia)

23 September 2021	Maritsa Plovdiv (II)	1−3	Slavia Sofia (I)	Plovdiv
16:00 UTC+3	Marchev 39'	Report	Dost 49'; Makrillos 59', 90+5' (pen.)	Stadium: Stadion Maritsa; Referee: Ivaylo Nenkov (Sofia)

23 September 2021	Spartak Varna (II)	0−1	Ludogorets Razgrad (I)	Varna
16:00 UTC+3		Report	Marín 45+2' (pen.)	Stadium: Stadion Spartak; Attendance: 1,200; Referee: Stanislav Todorov (Shumen)

23 September 2021	Lokomotiv Gorna Oryahovitsa (III)	3−2	Botev Vratsa (I)	Gorna Oryahovitsa
19:00 UTC+3	Ahmed 8'; Kolev 37'; Gavazov 60'	Report	Nenov 72'; Todorov 85'	Stadium: Stadion Lokomotiv; Referee: Ivan Ivanov (Sofia)

8 October 2021	Levski Lom (II)	0−1	Lokomotiv Sofia (I)	Lom
15:00 UTC+3		Report	Grigorov 11' (o.g.)	Stadium: Stadion Dunavski Yunak; Referee: Petar Kuzev (Gabrovo)
Note: Originally, the game has been scheduled for 22 September. On 16 September the Bulgarian Football Union declared the postponement of the game due to the high number of positive COVID-19 cases within the Levski Lom squad. On 30 September the BFU announced that the game has been rescheduled for 8 October 2021.

=== Round of 16 ===
The draw was conducted on 23 September 2021. The games were played between 26 October and 17 November 2021. In this stage the participants are the 16 winners from the previous round.

26 October 2021	Lokomotiv Sofia (I)	0−2	Lokomotiv Plovdiv (I)	Sofia
16:00 UTC+3		Report	Iliev 46'; Gomis 90+3'	Stadium: Stadion Lokomotiv; Attendance: 300; Referee: Valentin Zhelezov (Burgas)

26 October 2021	Levski Sofia (I)	7−0	Septemvri Simitli (II)	Sofia
19:00 UTC+3	M. Petkov 20'; Bari 22', 27', 70'; Milanov 68'; B. Tsonev 80'; Kostadinov 82'	Report		Stadium: Stadion Vivacom Arena - Georgi Asparuhov; Attendance: 800; Referee: Vasimir El-Hatib (Sofia)

27 October 2021	Slavia Sofia (I)	1−0	Pirin Blagoevgrad (I)	Sofia
16:00 UTC+3	Tasev 51'	Report		Stadium: Stadion Aleksandar Shalamanov; Attendance: 250; Referee: Georgi Kabakov (Plovdiv)

27 October 2021	Beroe Stara Zagora (I)	1−0	Cherno More Varna (I)	Stara Zagora
19:00 UTC+3	Kamburov 67'	Report		Stadium: Stadion Beroe; Attendance: 300; Referee: Ivaylo Stoyanov (Petrich)

28 October 2021	Septemvri Sofia (II)	4−1	Etar Veliko Tarnovo (II)	Sofia
15:00 UTC+3	Stoichkov 21'; Ilievski 35', 66'; Ramadan 52'	Report	Femia 90+1'	Stadium: Stadion DIT; Attendance: 30; Referee: Radoslav Gidzhenov (Plovdiv)

28 October 2021	Ludogorets Razgrad (I)	3−1	Lokomotiv Gorna Oryahovitsa (III)	Razgrad
16:00 UTC+3	Marín 12'; Manu 37'; Show 79'	Report	Kolev 58'	Stadium: Ludogorets Arena; Attendance: 150; Referee: Georgi Ivanov (Sofia)

28 October 2021	CSKA Sofia (I)	2−0	Arda Kardzhali (I)	Sofia
19:00 UTC+3	Caicedo 22', 36'	Report		Stadium: Stadion Balgarska Armia; Attendance: 850; Referee: Stanimir Trenchev (Sofia)

17 November 2021	Krumovgrad (III)	2−2 (a.e.t.) (1−3 p)	Montana (II)	Krumovgrad
13:30 UTC+2	Karamfilov 25'; Osman 119'	Report	Ouamri 26'; Tsekov 106'	Stadium: Sporten kompleks Krumovgrad; Attendance: 700; Referee: Dimo Dimov (Sliven)
	Penalties
	Karamfilov (penalty missed); Simeonov (penalty missed); Yashar (penalty scored); Dimitrov (penalty missed)		Yordanov (penalty missed); Tsekov (penalty scored); Burov (penalty scored); Ouamri (penalty scored)

=== Quarter-finals ===
The draw was conducted on 28 October 2021. The games were played between 1 and 3 March 2022. In this stage the participants are the 8 winners from the previous round.

1 March 2022	CSKA Sofia (I)	2−0	Lokomotiv Plovdiv (I)	Sofia
17:30 UTC+2	Caicedo 33'; Yomov 41'	Report		Stadium: Stadion Balgarska Armia; Attendance: 4,000; Referee: Stanimir Trenchev (Sofia)

2 March 2022	Montana (II)	0−5	Ludogorets Razgrad (I)	Razgrad (Note: Montana plays their quarterfinal home match at Huvepharma Arena, Razgrad, instead of their regular stadium Stadion Ogosta in Montana, which was undergoing renovation works.)
14:30 UTC+2		Report	Yankov 5', 45+1'; Tissera 16', 34'; Cauly 79'	Stadium: Huvepharma Arena; Attendance: 350; Referee: Radoslav Gidzhenov (Plovdiv)

2 March 2022	Septemvri Sofia (II)	0−2	Levski Sofia (I)	Sofia
17:30 UTC+2		Report	Kostadinov 21'; Milanov 48' (pen.)	Stadium: Stadion Vivacom Arena - Georgi Asparuhov (Note: Septemvri Sofia will host the match at Vivacom Arena - Georgi Asparuhov, Sofia, instead of their own home venue Stadion DIT, Sofia, as it does not meet BFU's requirements for this stage of the tournament. Initially Septemvri intended to host the match at Arena Tsarsko Selo, Sofia, but the BFU declined their application due to the small capacity of the stadium.); Attendance: 3,500; Referee: Dimo Dimov (Sliven)

3 March 2022	Slavia Sofia (I)	2−1	Beroe Stara Zagora (I)	Sofia
17:30 UTC+2	Tasev 41'; Kirilov 57' (pen.)	Report	Furtado 38'	Stadium: Stadion Aleksandar Shalamanov; Attendance: 500; Referee: Stanislav Todorov (Shumen)

=== Semi-finals ===
The draw was conducted on 4 March 2022. The first legs should be played on 12 and 13 April, while the second legs are scheduled for 21 and 22 April 2022. Contrary to the generally accepted regulations in European football, the away goals rule will apply.

==== First legs ====
12 April 2022	Slavia Sofia	0−2	CSKA Sofia	Sofia
19:00 UTC+3		Report	Zajkov 22' (o.g.); Turitsov 90+2' (pen.)	Stadium: Stadion Aleksandar Shalamanov; Referee: Nikola Popov (Sofia)

13 April 2022	Ludogorets Razgrad	2−3	Levski Sofia	Razgrad
19:00 UTC+3	Despodov 11'; Sotiriou 90+3' (pen.)	Report	Mihajlović 52'; Bari 57'; M. Petkov 90+11' (pen.)	Stadium: Huvepharma Arena; Attendance: 5,000; Referee: Ivaylo Stoyanov (Petrich)

==== Second legs ====
21 April 2022	CSKA Sofia	0−2 (a.e.t.) (2−2 agg.) (7−6 p)	Slavia Sofia	Sofia
19:00 UTC+3		Report	Tasev 8'; Minchev 12'	Stadium: Stadion Balgarska Armia; Referee: Volen Chinkov (Sofia)
	Penalties
	Carey (penalty scored); Muhar (penalty scored); Youga (penalty scored); Lam (penalty scored); Caicedo (penalty scored); Donchev (penalty scored); Koch (penalty missed); Mazikou (penalty scored)		(penalty scored) Valchev; (penalty scored) Stoyanov; (penalty scored) Soares; (penalty scored) M. D. Petkov; (penalty scored) Kerchev; (penalty scored) Dobrev; (penalty missed) Nikolayevich; (penalty missed) Nguena

22 April 2022	Levski Sofia	1−0 (4−2 agg.)	Ludogorets Razgrad	Sofia
19:00 UTC+3	Welton 3'	Report		Stadium: Stadion Vivacom Arena - Georgi Asparuhov; Attendance: 18,732; Referee: Dragomir Draganov (Varna)

=== Final ===
15 May 2022
17:00 EEST

CSKA Sofia	0−1	Levski Sofia
	Report	Stefanov 57'

Vasil Levski National Stadium, Sofia
Attendance: 40,600
Referee: Nikola Popov (Sofia)

== Bracket ==
Round of 32
2	Maritsa Plovdiv	1
1	Slavia Sofia	3
3	Bansko	1
1	Pirin Blagoevgrad	2
3	Rozova Dolina Kazanlak	0
1	Beroe Stara Zagora	6
2	Minyor Pernik	0
1	Cherno More Varna	2
2	Hebar Pazardzhik	0
1	CSKA Sofia	3
3	Yambol	0
1	Arda Kardzhali	3
2	Levski Lom	0
1	Lokomotiv Sofia	1
2	Rodopa Smolyan	0
1	Lokomotiv Plovdiv	4
3	Krumovgrad (a.e.t.)	1
1	Tsarsko Selo Sofia	0
2	Montana	1
1	CSKA 1948 Sofia	0
2	Spartak Varna	0
1	Ludogorets Razgrad	1
3	Lokomotiv Gorna Oryahovitsa	3
1	Botev Vratsa	2
2	Sportist Svoge	0
2	Septemvri Sofia	1
2	Etar Veliko Tarnovo (a.e.t.)	1
1	Botev Plovdiv	0
2	Marek Dupnitsa	0
1	Levski Sofia	2
3	Septemvri Tervel	0
2	Septemvri Simitli	1

Round of 16
1	Slavia Sofia	1
1	Pirin Blagoevgrad	0
1	Beroe Stara Zagora	1
1	Cherno More Varna	0
1	CSKA Sofia	2
1	Arda Kardzhali	0
1	Lokomotiv Sofia	0
1	Lokomotiv Plovdiv	2
3	Krumovgrad	2 (1)
2	Montana (p)	2 (3)
1	Ludogorets Razgrad	3
3	Lokomotiv Gorna Oryahovitsa	1
2	Septemvri Sofia	4
2	Etar Veliko Tarnovo	1
1	Levski Sofia	7
2	Septemvri Simitli	0

Quarter-finals
1	Slavia Sofia	2
1	Beroe Stara Zagora	1
1	CSKA Sofia	2
1	Lokomotiv Plovdiv	0
2	Montana	0
1	Ludogorets Razgrad	5
2	Septemvri Sofia	0
1	Levski Sofia	2

Semi-finals
1	Slavia Sofia	0	2 (6)
1	CSKA Sofia (p)	2	0 (7)
1	Ludogorets Razgrad	2	0
1	Levski Sofia	3	1

Final
1	CSKA Sofia	0
1	Levski Sofia	1

== Top goalscorers ==
As of 15 May 2022

Rank	Player	Club	Goals
1	(Ecuador) Jordy Caicedo	CSKA Sofia	5
2	(Morocco) Bilal Bari	Levski Sofia	4
2	(Bulgaria) Dimitar Kostadinov	Levski Sofia	4
4	(Bulgaria) Georgi Minchev	Lokomotiv Plovdiv	3
4	(Bulgaria) Toni Tasev	Slavia Sofia	3
6	nine players		2
