= 2020–21 PFC Levski Sofia season =

Levski Sofia
2020–21 season
- Chairman: Nasko Sirakov
- Manager: Georgi Todorov (until 24 October 2020); Slaviša Stojanovič (since 10 November 2020)
- Stadium: Vivacom Arena - Georgi Asparuhov
- First League: 8th
- Bulgarian Cup: Quarter-finals
- Top goalscorer: League: Nigel Robertha; Borislav Tsonev (6); All: Nigel Robertha (9)
- Biggest win: 4–0 v. Montana (A)
- Biggest defeat: 0–3 v. Ludogorets Razgrad (H)
Home colours	Away colours	Third colours

The 2020–21 season was Levski Sofia's 100th season in the First League. This article shows player statistics and all matches (official and friendly) that the club has played during the season.

It is considered the worst season in the club's history. Levski finished on an all-time low 8th place, breaking a number of negative records. For the first time, the club finished a season with more losses than wins.

== Transfers ==
=== In ===
No.	Pos.	Nat.	Name	Age	EU	Moving from	Type	Transfer window	Ends	Transfer fee	Source
1	GK	(Croatia)	Zvonimir Mikulić	30	EU	(Moldova) Sheriff Tiraspol	Free transfer	Winter	2021	Free	levski.bg
2	DF	(Bulgaria)	Alex Petkov	21	EU	(Scotland) Hearts	Free transfer	Summer	2021	Free	levski.bg
3	DF	(Bulgaria)	Zhivko Atanasov	29	EU	(Italy) Catanzaro	Free transfer	Summer	2022	Free	levski.bg
5	DF	(Iraq)	Rebin Sulaka	28	EU	(Bulgaria) Arda	Free transfer	Winter	2021	Free	levski.bg
9	FW	(Bulgaria)	Steven Petkov	25	EU	(Portugal) Feirense	Loan	Summer	2021	Free	levski.bg
10	MF	(Bulgaria)	Borislav Tsonev	25	EU	(Croatia) Inter Zaprešić	Free transfer	Summer	2021	Free	levski.bg
12	GK	(Bulgaria)	Nikolay Krastev	23	EU	(Bulgaria) Vitosha Bistritsa	Free transfer	Summer	2021	Free	levski.bg
14	MF	(Bulgaria)	Mateo Stamatov	21	EU	(Spain) UA Horta	Free transfer	Summer	2021	Free	levski.bg
19	FW	(Morocco)	Bilal Bari	23	EU	(Bulgaria) Montana	Transfer	Winter	2022	50 000 €	levski.bg
20	DF	(Spain)	Nacho Monsalve	26	EU	(Netherlands) NAC Breda	Free transfer	Winter	2022	Free	levski.bg
21	MF	(Bulgaria)	Radoslav Tsonev	25	EU	(Italy) Lecce	Free transfer	Summer	2021	Free	levski.bg
23	DF	(Morocco)	Faycal Rherras	27	EU	(Morocco) Mouloudia Oujda	Free transfer	Winter	2022	Free	levski.bg
28	DF	(France)	Thomas Dasquet	26	EU	(France) Le Mans	Free transfer	Summer	2022	Free	levski.bg
39	DF	(Bulgaria)	Deyan Ivanov	24	EU	(Bulgaria) Botev Vratsa	Loan return	Summer		Free	
41	DF	(Bulgaria)	Georgi Aleksandrov	19	EU	(Bulgaria) Vitosha Bistritsa	Free transfer	Summer	2022	Free	levski.bg
45	FW	(Bulgaria)	Iliya Dimitrov	24	EU	(Bulgaria) Vitosha Bistritsa	Loan return	Summer		Free	
66	DF	(Bulgaria)	Orlin Starokin	33	EU	(Cyprus) Enosis Neon Paralimni	Free transfer	Summer	2021	Free	levski.bg
86	FW	(Bulgaria)	Valeri Bojinov	34	EU	(Italy) Pescara	Free transfer	Summer	2021	Free	levski.bg
89	FW	(Bulgaria)	Andrian Kraev	21	EU	(Bulgaria) Hebar	Free transfer	Summer	2021	Free	levski.bg
91	DF	(Switzerland)	Dragan Mihajlović	29	EU	(Cyprus) APOEL	Free transfer	Winter	2021	Free	levski.bg
93	MF	(Bulgaria)	Atanas Kabov	21	EU	(Bulgaria) Vitosha Bistritsa	Loan return	Summer		Free	

Total spending: €50 000 ▼

=== Out ===
No.	Pos.	Nat.	Name	Age	EU	Moving to	Type	Transfer window	Transfer fee	Source
1	GK	(Montenegro)	Milan Mijatović	32	Non-EU	(Hungary) MTK Budapest	End of contract	Summer	Free	gong.bg
2	DF	(Bulgaria)	Alex Petkov	21	EU	(Bulgaria) Arda	Released	Winter	Free	levski.bg
4	DF	(Bulgaria)	Ivan Goranov	28	EU	(Belgium) Charleroi	Transfer	Summer	125 000 €	levski.bg
5	DF	(Iceland)	Hólmar Örn Eyjólfsson	36	EU	(Norway) Rosenborg	Released	Summer	Free	levski.bg
5	DF	(Iraq)	Rebin Sulaka	29	EU	(Thailand) Buriram United	Released	Winter	Free	levski.bg
7	MF	(Brazil)	Paulinho	27	EU	(United Arab Emirates) Khor Fakkan	Transfer	Winter	300 000 €	levski.bg
9	FW	(Austria)	Deni Alar	30	EU	(Austria) Rapid Wien	Loan return	Summer	Free	
10	MF	(Argentina)	Franco Mazurek	26	Non-EU	(Greece) Panetolikos	Released	Summer	Free	levski.bg
14	MF	(Portugal)	Filipe Nascimento	25	EU	(Poland) Radomiak Radom	End of contract	Summer	Free	levski.bg
15	MF	(Bulgaria)	Martin Haydarov	17	EU	(Bulgaria) CSKA 1948	Released	Summer	Free	
17	FW	(Netherlands)	Nigel Robertha	23	EU	(United States) D.C. United	Transfer	Winter	Undisclosed	levski.bg
19	DF	(Greece)	Giannis Kargas	25	EU	(Greece) PAS Giannina	Released	Summer	Free	levski.bg
20	DF	(Bulgaria)	Zhivko Milanov	35	EU		Retired	Summer		levski.bg
22	DF	(Portugal)	Nuno Reis	29	EU	(Australia) Melbourne City	Released	Summer	Free	sportal.bg
23	MF	(Senegal)	Khaly Thiam	26	Non-EU	(Turkey) Altay	End of contract	Summer	Free	gong.bg
26	DF	(Bulgaria)	Deyan Lozev	26	EU	(Bulgaria) Arda	Released	Summer	Free	levski.bg
27	GK	(Bulgaria)	Georgi Georgiev	31	EU	(Bulgaria) Cherno More	Released	Summer	Free	levski.bg
29	FW	(Bulgaria)	Stanislav Kostov	28	EU	(Cyprus) Olympiakos Nicosia	Released	Summer	Free	levski.bg
39	DF	(Bulgaria)	Deyan Ivanov	24	EU	(Bulgaria) Lokomotiv Sofia	Released	Winter	Free	levski.bg
40	MF	(Netherlands)	Stijn Spierings	24	EU	(France) Toulouse	Transfer	Summer	Undisclosed	levski.bg
66	DF	(Bulgaria)	Orlin Starokin	33	EU	(Bulgaria) Pirin Blagoevgrad	Released	Winter	Free	levski.bg
93	MF	(Bulgaria)	Atanas Kabov	21	EU	(Bulgaria) Slavia Sofia	Released	Summer	Free	levski.bg
99	MF	(Bulgaria)	Stanislav Ivanov	21	EU	(United States) Chicago Fire	Transfer	Winter	Undisclosed	levski.bg

Total income: +€425 000 ▲

Net income: +€375 000 ▲

=== Loans out ===
No.	Pos.	Nat.	Name	Age	EU	Moving to	Type	Transfer window	Transfer fee	Source
	GK	(Bulgaria)	Petar Ivanov	20	EU	Sportist Svoge	Loan	Winter	—	
	GK	(Bulgaria)	Ivan Andonov	17	EU	(Italy) Fiorentina Primavera	Loan	Winter	—	

== Squad ==
Updated on 6 May 2021.

No.	Name	Nationality	Position(s)	Age	EU	Since	Ends	Signed from	Transfer fee	Notes
Goalkeepers
1	Zvonimir Mikulić	Croatia	GK	36	EU	2021	2021	(Moldova) Sheriff Tiraspol	Free	
12	Nikolay Krastev	Bulgaria	GK	29	EU	2020	2021	(Bulgaria) Vitosha Bistritsa	Free	Originally from Youth system
13	Nikolay Mihaylov	Bulgaria	GK	38	EU	2018	2021	(Cyprus) Omonia	Free	Originally from Youth system
66	Plamen Andreev	Bulgaria	GK	21	EU	2021	2024	Youth system	W/S	
Defenders
3	Zhivko Atanasov	Bulgaria	CB	35	EU	2020	2022	(Italy) Catanzaro	Free	Originally from Youth system
6	Ivaylo Naydenov	Bulgaria	RB/DM	28	EU	2016	2023	Youth system	W/S	
14	Mateo Stamatov	Bulgaria	LB/LW	27	EU	2020	2021	(Spain) UA Horta	Free	
15	Bogdan Kostov	Bulgaria	LB	24	EU	2021		Youth system	W/S	
20	Nacho Monsalve	Spain	CB/RB/LB	32	EU	2021	2022	(Netherlands) NAC Breda	Free	
22	Patrick-Gabriel Galchev	Bulgaria	LB	25	EU	2020	2023	Youth system	W/S	Second nationality: Spain
31	Kostadin Iliev	Bulgaria	CB	24	EU	2020		Youth system	W/S	
41	Georgi Aleksandrov	Bulgaria	CB	25	EU	2020	2022	(Bulgaria) Vitosha Bistritsa	Free	Originally from Youth system
91	Dragan Mihajlović	Switzerland	RB	34	EU	2021	2021	(Cyprus) APOEL	Free	
Midfielders
4	Martin Raynov	Bulgaria	DM/CM	34	EU	2019	2021	(Bulgaria) Beroe	Free	
8	Simeon Slavchev	Bulgaria	DM	32	EU	2019	2022	(Azerbaijan) Qarabağ	Free	
10	Borislav Tsonev	Bulgaria	AM	31	EU	2020	2021	(Croatia) Inter Zaprešić	Free	Originally from Youth system
21	Radoslav Tsonev	Bulgaria	CM	31	EU	2020	2021	(Italy) Lecce	Free	Originally from Youth system
27	Asen Mitkov	Bulgaria	AM/CM	21	EU	2021	2024	Youth system	W/S	
77	Iliya Yurukov	Bulgaria	CM	26	EU	2016	2023	Youth system	W/S	
88	Marin Petkov	Bulgaria	AM/SS	22	EU	2020	2023	Youth system	W/S	
89	Andrian Kraev	Bulgaria	AM/CF	27	EU	2020	2021	(Bulgaria) Hebar	Free	Originally from Youth system
99	Nikolay Arahangelov	Bulgaria	CM	22	EU	2021		Youth system	W/S	
Forwards
9	Steven Petkov	Bulgaria	CF	31	EU	2020	2021	(Portugal) Feirense	Loan	Originally from Youth system
11	Zdravko Dimitrov	Bulgaria	LW	27	EU	2019	2022	(Bulgaria) Septemvri Sofia	Free	
19	Bilal Bari	Morocco	CF	28	EU	2021	2022	(Bulgaria) Montana	€50 000	Second nationality: France
45	Iliya Dimitrov	Bulgaria	CF	30	EU	2014	2022	Youth system	W/S	
70	Ivaylo Hristov	Bulgaria	LW	24	EU	2021		Youth system	W/S	
79	Martin D. Petkov	Bulgaria	LW/CF	23	EU	2019	2023	Youth system	W/S	
86	Valeri Bojinov	Bulgaria	CF	40	EU	2020	2021	(Italy) Pescara	Free	

== Performance overview ==
Competition	First match	Last match	Starting round	Final position	Record							
Competition	First match	Last match	Starting round	Final position	Pld	W	D	L	GF	GA	GD	Win %
First League	10 August 2020	23 May 2021	Matchday 1	8th	32	11	8	13	34	32	+2	34.38
Bulgarian Cup	21 October 2020	17 March 2021	Round of 32	Quarter-finals	3	2	0	1	8	4	+4	66.67
Total					35	13	8	14	42	36	+6	37.14

Source: Fixtures

== Fixtures ==
Win Draw Loss Upcoming fixture

=== Friendlies ===
==== Summer ====
1 August 2020	Levski Sofia	2–1	Vitosha Bistritsa	Sofia
18:30 EEST	M. Petkov 23'; Robertha 50'	Report	Terziyski 84'	Stadium: Vivacom Arena - Georgi Asparuhov; Referee: Georgi Nikolov

==== Mid-season ====
28 March 2021	Levski Sofia	0–1	Lokomotiv Sofia	Sofia
16:00 EET		Report	Nikolov 89'	Stadium: Vivacom Arena - Georgi Asparuhov; Referee: Georgi Nikolov

3 April 2021	Levski Sofia	2–0	Slivnishki Geroy	Sofia
16:00 EEST	Bari 7', 43'	Report		Stadium: Vivacom Arena - Georgi Asparuhov; Referee: Stanimir Trenchev

==== Winter ====
20 January 2021	Levski Sofia (Bulgaria)	1–2	(Slovenia) Domžale	Umag, Croatia
15:00 CET	M. Petkov 24'	Report	Podlogar 77'; Dobrovoljc 79'	Stadium: Stella Maris Football Camp

23 January 2021	Levski Sofia (Bulgaria)	1–0	(Poland) Podbeskidzie Bielsko-Biała	Poreč, Croatia
12:00 CET	M. D. Petkov 23'	Report		Stadium: Zelena Laguna Sports Centre

27 January 2021	Levski Sofia (Bulgaria)	2–1	(Slovenia) Koper	Poreč, Croatia
15:00 CET	Robertha 16'; Steven 28'	Report	Cerovec 54'	Stadium: Zelena Laguna Sports Centre

30 January 2021	Levski Sofia (Bulgaria)	1–0	(Slovenia) Olimpija Ljubljana	Umag, Croatia
15:00 CET	Robertha 17'	Report		Stadium: Stella Maris Football Camp

2 February 2021	Levski Sofia (Bulgaria)	0–1	(Bosnia and Herzegovina) Sarajevo	Umag, Croatia
14:30 CET		Report	Handžić 56'	Stadium: Stella Maris Football Camp

7 February 2021	Levski Sofia	1–0	Sportist Svoge	Sofia
17:00 EET	Robertha 9'	Report		Stadium: Vivacom Arena - Georgi Asparuhov; Referee: Stanimir Trenchev

=== Parva Liga ===
==== Preliminary stage ====
===== League table =====
Pos	Team	Pld	W	D	L	GF	GA	GD	Pts	Qualification
7	Cherno More	26	10	7	9	27	25	+2	37 (Note: Head-to-head points (GD): Beroe 3 (+3), Cherno More 3 (-3).)	Qualification for the Europa Conference League group
8	Tsarsko Selo	26	9	7	10	29	27	+2	34	Qualification for the Europa Conference League group
9	Levski Sofia	26	7	7	12	25	27	−2	28	Qualification for the Europa Conference League group
10	Botev Plovdiv	26	5	9	12	25	46	−21	24	Qualification for the Europa Conference League group
11	Slavia Sofia	26	6	5	15	19	40	−21	23	Qualification for the Relegation group

Source: Soccerway, Bulgarian Football
Rules for classification: 1) Points; 2) Head-to-head points; 3) Head-to-head goal difference; 4) Head-to-head goals scored; 5) Head-to-head away goals scored (only if two teams); 6) Goal difference; 7) Goals scored; 8) Fairplay ranking; 9) Draw.

===== Results summary =====
Overall								Home						Away					
Pld	W	D	L	GF	GA	GD	Pts	W	D	L	GF	GA	GD	W	D	L	GF	GA	GD
26	7	7	12	25	27	−2	28	5	2	6	13	15	−2	2	5	6	12	12	0

Last updated: 25 April 2021.
Source: bulgarian-football.com

===== Results by round =====
Round	1	2	3	4	5	6	7	8	9	10	11	12	13	14	15	16	17	18	19	20	21	22	23	24	25	26
Ground	H	A	H	A	H	H	A	H	A	H	A	H	A	A	H	A	H	A	A	H	A	H	A	H	A	H
Result	L	D	L	W	W	W	L	D	L	L	L	W	L	L	L	D	W	D	D	D	W	W	D	L	L	L
Position	12	12	12	8	7	6	6	8	9	11	12	10	9	11	11	9	8	8	9	9	9	8	8	9	9	9

Source: See Results
A = Away; H = Home; W = Win; D = Draw; L = Loss

===== Matches =====
10 August 2020 1	Levski Sofia	0–2	Beroe	Sofia
20:00 EEST		Report	Stoyanov (yellow card) 22'; Angelov (yellow card) 28'; Slavchev 34' (o.g.); Octávio 41'; Furtado (yellow card) 84'; Fall (yellow card) 90'	Stadium: Vivacom Arena - Georgi Asparuhov; Attendance: 1,000; Referee: Vladimir Valkov (Plovdiv); Man of the Match: Hristiyan Vasilev
Note: On 9 July 2020 the Ministry of Health announced that the stadiums are not allowed to host spectators due to a recent spike of COVID-19-related infections in Bulgaria. On 31 July 2020 the Ministry for Sport and Youth confirmed the extension of these provisions until 31 August 2020. Yet, on 5 August 2020 the Ministry for Sport and Youth reversed its decision by allowing stadiums to host up to 50% of its capacity, but no more than 1,000 spectators per block.

15 August 2020 2	Arda	1–1	Levski Sofia	Kardzhali
20:00 EEST	Kokonov 8'; Lozev (yellow card) 38'; Martinov (yellow card) 87'	Report	Naydenov (yellow card) 4' (yellow-red card) 53'; Paulinho 49'; Spierings (yellow card) 82'	Stadium: Arena Arda; Attendance: 1,000; Referee: Stanislav Todorov (Shumen); Man of the Match: Nikolay Mihaylov
Note: According to a regulation, issued on 5 August 2020 by the Ministry for Sport and Youth, stadiums are allowed to host up to 50% of its capacity, but no more than 1,000 spectators per block.

23 August 2020 3	Levski Sofia	0–1	Tsarsko Selo	Sofia
17:45 EEST	Dasquet (yellow card) 45'	Report	Vasev 45+2'; Georgiev (yellow card) 69'	Stadium: Vivacom Arena - Georgi Asparuhov; Attendance: 700; Referee: Georgi Davidov (Veliko Tarnovo); Man of the Match: Bozhidar Vasev
Note: According to a regulation, issued on 5 August 2020 by the Ministry for Sport and Youth, stadiums are allowed to host up to 50% of its capacity, but no more than 1,000 spectators per block.

29 August 2020 4	Montana	0–4	Levski Sofia	Montana
19:00 EEST	P. M. Petrov (yellow card) 13'; Yordanov (yellow card) 45+2'; Krastev (yellow card) 74'	Report	Spierings 28', 48', (yellow card) 73'; Paulinho 42'; Naydenov 67'	Stadium: Ogosta; Attendance: 1,000; Referee: Dragomir Draganov (Varna); Man of the Match: Stijn Spierings
Note: According to a regulation, issued on 5 August 2020 by the Ministry for Sport and Youth, stadiums are allowed to host up to 50% of its capacity, but no more than 1,000 spectators per block.

13 September 2020 5	Levski Sofia	2–1	Etar	Sofia
21:00 EEST	Atanasov 36'; B. Tsonev 78'	Report	Krachunov (yellow card) 36'; Borukov 44'; Angelov (yellow card) 45+1'; Katsarov (yellow card) 75'; Pehlivanov (yellow card) 90+1'; Kupenov (yellow card) 90+4'	Stadium: Vivacom Arena - Georgi Asparuhov; Attendance: 1,000; Referee: Stanimir Trenchev (Sofia); Man of the Match: Borislav Tsonev
Note: According to a regulation, issued on 5 August 2020 by the Ministry for Sport and Youth, stadiums are allowed to host up to 50% of its capacity, but no more than 1,000 spectators per block. On 1 September 2020, the Ministry of Sport and Youth extended the validity of this regulation until 30 September 2020.

19 September 2020 6	Levski Sofia	3–0	CSKA 1948	Sofia
21:00 EEST	Nasiru 6'; Spierings (yellow card) 36'; B. Tsonev 56', 63' (pen.)	Report	Rusev (yellow card) 30'; Marin (yellow card) 33'; Yusein (yellow card) 50'; Klimentov (yellow card) 60'; Mladenov (yellow card) 86'	Stadium: Vivacom Arena - Georgi Asparuhov; Attendance: 1,000; Referee: Volen Chinkov (Sofia); Man of the Match: Borislav Tsonev
Note: According to a regulation, issued on 5 August 2020 by the Ministry for Sport and Youth, stadiums are allowed to host up to 50% of its capacity, but no more than 1,000 spectators per block. On 1 September 2020, the Ministry of Sport and Youth extended the validity of this regulation until 30 September 2020.

26 September 2020 7	Botev Plovdiv	2–1	Levski Sofia	Plovdiv
21:00 EEST	Iliev 14', 20'; Espinosa (yellow card) 21'; Cikarski (yellow card) 45'; Johnathan (yellow card) 75'; Argilashki (yellow card) 90+3'	Report	B. Tsonev 27' (pen.); Paulinho (yellow card) 63'; Atanasov (yellow card) 84'; Dasquet (yellow card) 87'	Stadium: Botev 1912 Football Complex; Attendance: 2,000; Referee: Georgi Dimitrov (Sofia); Man of the Match: Atanas Iliev
Note: According to a regulation, issued on 5 August 2020 by the Ministry for Sport and Youth, stadiums are allowed to host up to 50% of its capacity, but no more than 1,000 spectators per block. On 1 September 2020, the Ministry of Sport and Youth extended the validity of this regulation until 30 September 2020.

3 October 2020 8	Levski Sofia	0–0	Botev Vratsa	Sofia
20:15 EEST	Dasquet (yellow card) 53'; Kraev (yellow card) 70'	Report	N'Diaye (yellow card) 64'; Dobrev (yellow card) 70'; Zlatinski (yellow card) 76'; Gadzhev (yellow card) 79'; Kostov (yellow card) 90+4'	Stadium: Vivacom Arena - Georgi Asparuhov; Attendance: 0 Referee: Ivo Andreev (Sofia); Man of the Match: Krasimir Kostov
Note: According to a regulation, issued on 5 August 2020 by the Ministry for Sport and Youth, stadiums are allowed to host up to 50% of its capacity, but no more than 1,000 spectators per block. On 1 September 2020, the Ministry of Sport and Youth extended the validity of this regulation until 30 September 2020. A further extension until 31 October 2020 was granted by the Ministry of Sport and Youth on 30 September 2020.

18 October 2020 9	Slavia Sofia	1–0	Levski Sofia	Sofia
20:15 EEST	Antovski (yellow card) 7'; Terziev (yellow card) 18'; Krastev 35'; Kabov (yellow card) 38'; Popadiyn (yellow card) 66'; Rangelov (yellow card) 86'	Report	A. Petkov (yellow card) 33'; Atanasov (red card) 37'	Stadium: Slavia; Attendance: 3,000; Referee: Stanislav Todorov (Shumen); Man of the Match: Georgi Petkov
Note: According to a regulation, issued on 5 August 2020 by the Ministry for Sport and Youth, stadiums are allowed to host up to 50% of its capacity, but no more than 1,000 spectators per block. On 1 September 2020, the Ministry of Sport and Youth extended the validity of this regulation until 30 September 2020. A further extension until 31 October 2020 was granted by the Ministry of Sport and Youth on 30 September 2020.

24 October 2020 10	Levski Sofia	1–2	Cherno More	Sofia
20:15 EEST	Raynov 20' (yellow card) 30'; A. Petkov (yellow card) 36'; Dasquet (yellow card) 77'	Report	Iliev Jr. (yellow card) 40' (yellow-red card) 45+2'; Coureur 55'; Panayotov 69'; Rodrigo (yellow card) 87'	Stadium: Vivacom Arena - Georgi Asparuhov; Attendance: 1,000; Referee: Georgi Kabakov (Plovdiv); Man of the Match: Vasil Panayotov
Note: According to a regulation, issued on 5 August 2020 by the Ministry for Sport and Youth, stadiums are allowed to host up to 50% of its capacity, but no more than 1,000 spectators per block. On 1 September 2020, the Ministry of Sport and Youth extended the validity of this regulation until 30 September 2020. A further extension until 31 October 2020 was granted by the Ministry of Sport and Youth on 30 September 2020.

1 November 2020 11	Ludogorets Razgrad	1–0	Levski Sofia	Razgrad
19:15 EET	Sá (yellow card) 41'; Santana (yellow card) 77'; Cauly 84'; Dyakov (yellow card) 86'	Report	Raynov (yellow card) 34'; Robertha (yellow card) 85'; Bojinov (yellow card) 85'	Stadium: Huvepharma Arena; Attendance: 0 Referee: Volen Chinkov (Sofia); Man of the Match: Cauly
Note: On 27 October 2020, the Ministry of Health announced that stadiums are not allowed to host spectators for the following two weeks due to a recent spike of COVID-19-related infections in Bulgaria.

2 December 2020 12	Levski Sofia	1–0	Lokomotiv Plovdiv	Sofia
17:30 EET	Robertha 36' (pen.); Raynov (yellow card) 89'	Report	Almeida (yellow card) 23'; Iliev (yellow card) 74'	Stadium: Vivacom Arena - Georgi Asparuhov; Attendance: 0 Referee: Valentin Zhelezov (Burgas); Man of the Match: Nasiru Mohammed
Note: The match, originally scheduled for 7 November, was postponed because of numerous COVID-19 infections in Levski squad. It was played behind closed doors due to a recent spike of COVID-19-related infections in Bulgaria.

5 December 2020 15	Levski Sofia	1–2	Arda	Sofia
16:30 EET	Raynov (yellow card) 25'; Paulinho 89'; Atanasov (yellow card) 90'	Report	Leoni 41'; Kokonov (yellow card) 44', (goal) 90'; Kovachev (yellow card) 50'; Kotev (yellow card) 84'; Zhelev (yellow card) 87'	Stadium: Vivacom Arena - Georgi Asparuhov; Attendance: 0 Referee: Ivaylo Stoyanov (Petrich); Man of the Match: Ivan Kokonov
Note: The match was played behind closed doors due to a recent spike of COVID-19-related infections in Bulgaria.

9 December 2020 14	Beroe	2–1	Levski Sofia	Stara Zagora
17:30 EET	Fall 26', 63'; Vasilev (yellow card) 43'; Furtado (yellow card) 55'; Minchev (yellow card) 65'; Makouta (yellow card) 67'; Stoyanov (yellow card) 75'	Report	Paulinho 38'; A. Petkov (yellow card) 58'	Stadium: Beroe; Attendance: 0 Referee: Georgi Ivanov (Sofia); Man of the Match: Alioune Fall
Note: The match, originally scheduled for 28 November, was postponed because of numerous COVID-19 infections in Beroe squad. It was played behind closed doors due to a recent spike of COVID-19-related infections in Bulgaria.

12 December 2020 16	Tsarsko Selo	2–2	Levski Sofia	Sofia
16:30 EET	Markov (yellow card) 14'; Kavdanski 20', (yellow card) 37'; Daskalov (yellow card) 47', (goal) 64'; Baltanov (yellow card) 72' (yellow-red card) 90+1'	Report	Yurukov (yellow card) 19' (yellow-red card) 77'; Robertha 25', (yellow card) 44'; Starokin (yellow card) 37' (yellow-red card) 37'; S. Ivanov 39'; Galchev (yellow card) 90+3'; Krastev (yellow card) 90+4'	Stadium: Arena Tsarsko Selo; Attendance: 0 Referee: Nikolay Yordanov (Sofia); Man of the Match: Stanislav Ivanov
Note: The match was played behind closed doors due to a recent spike of COVID-19-related infections in Bulgaria.

18 December 2020 13	CSKA Sofia	1–0	Levski Sofia	Sofia
18:00 EET	Sowe 20'; Youga (yellow card) 29' (yellow-red card) 74'; Tiago (penalty missed) 34'; Vion (yellow card) 36'; Mazikou (yellow card) 46'; Mattheij (yellow card) 60'; Evtimov (yellow card) 62'; Antov (yellow card) 69'	Report	M. D. Petkov (yellow card) 34'; Stojanovič (yellow card) 36'; Paulinho (yellow card) 42'; Aleksandrov (yellow card) 90'; Bojinov (yellow card) 90+4'	Stadium: Vasil Levski National Stadium; Attendance: 0 Referee: Nikola Popov (Sofia); Man of the Match: Ali Sowe
Note: The match, originally scheduled for 21 November, was postponed because of numerous COVID-19 infections in Levski squad. It was played behind closed doors due to a recent spike of COVID-19-related infections in Bulgaria.

14 February 2021 17	Levski Sofia	2–0	Montana	Sofia
17:00 EET	Galchev (yellow card) 3'; Z. Dimitrov 14'; Dasquet (yellow card) 32'; Steven (yellow card) 49', (goal) 50'	Report	Yordanov (yellow card) 23'; Bashliev (yellow card) 69'; Tsonkov (yellow card) 86'	Stadium: Vivacom Arena - Georgi Asparuhov; Attendance: 0 Referee: Georgi Davidov (Veliko Tarnovo); Man of the Match: Zdravko Dimitrov
Note: On 26 January 2021, the Ministry of Health announced that stadiums are not allowed to host spectators until 30 April 2021 due to an ongoing COVID-19 pandemic in Bulgaria.

21 February 2021 18	Etar	0–0	Levski Sofia	Veliko Tarnovo
17:00 EET	Mechev (yellow card) 22'; Katsarov (yellow card) 32'; Filipov (yellow card) 56'; M. Ivanov (yellow card) 72' (yellow-red card) 84'; Angelov (yellow card) 90'; Gospodinov (yellow card) 90+2'	Report	Yurukov (yellow card) 34'; Bojinov (yellow card) 83'	Stadium: Ivaylo; Attendance: 0 Referee: Dragomir Draganov (Varna); Man of the Match: Anatoli Gospodinov
Note: The match was played behind closed doors due to the ongoing COVID-19 pandemic in Bulgaria.

28 February 2021 19	CSKA 1948	0–0	Levski Sofia	Sofia
17:00 EET	Rusev (yellow card) 77'; Mitkov (yellow card) 79'; Aleksandrov (yellow card) 90'	Report		Stadium: Vasil Levski National Stadium; Attendance: 0 Referee: Nikola Popov (Sofia); Man of the Match: Lazar Marin
Note: The match was played behind closed doors due to the ongoing COVID-19 pandemic in Bulgaria.

7 March 2021 20	Levski Sofia	2–2	Botev Plovdiv	Sofia
17:00 EET	Robertha 34'; M. D. Petkov 39'; Galchev (yellow card) 51'; Slavchev (yellow card) 57'; Aleksandrov (yellow card) 67'; Raynov (yellow card) 87'; Naydenov (yellow card) 89'	Report	Iliev 16', 56'	Stadium: Vivacom Arena - Georgi Asparuhov; Attendance: 0 Referee: Georgi Nikolov (Sofia); Man of the Match: Atanas Iliev
Note: The match was played behind closed doors due to the ongoing COVID-19 pandemic in Bulgaria.

13 March 2021 21	Botev Vratsa	1–3	Levski Sofia	Vratsa
16:30 EET	Nichev 6'; Genov (penalty missed) 15'; N'Diaye (yellow card) 32'; Ivaylov (yellow card) 35'; Kolev (yellow card) 84'	Report	Monsalve (yellow card) 27'; Galchev (yellow card) 34'; Aleksandrov (yellow card) 53'; Robertha 57', 66' (pen.); Atanasov 59'	Stadium: Hristo Botev; Attendance: 0 Referee: Vladimir Valkov (Plovdiv); Man of the Match: Nigel Robertha
Note: The match was played behind closed doors due to the ongoing COVID-19 pandemic in Bulgaria.

21 March 2021 22	Levski Sofia	1–0	Slavia Sofia	Sofia
16:30 EET	M. Petkov (yellow card) 71'; Robertha 85'; Mikulić (yellow card) 90+2'	Report	Uzunov (yellow card) 27'; Ghandri (yellow card) 49'; Hristov (yellow card) 90+1'	Stadium: Vivacom Arena - Georgi Asparuhov; Attendance: 0 Referee: Georgi Davidov (Veliko Tarnovo); Man of the Match: Nigel Robertha
Note: The match was played behind closed doors due to the ongoing COVID-19 pandemic in Bulgaria.

11 April 2021 23	Cherno More	0–0	Levski Sofia	Varna
19:45 EEST	Panayotov (yellow card) 21'; Dimov (yellow card) 82' (yellow-red card) 83'	Report	M. Petkov (yellow card) 15'; Kraev (yellow card) 70'; Milanov (yellow card) 74'; Atanasov (yellow card) 80'; Bari (yellow card) 82'	Stadium: Ticha; Attendance: 0 Referee: Stanislav Todorov (Shumen); Man of the Match: Georgi Georgiev
Note: The match was played behind closed doors due to the ongoing COVID-19 pandemic in Bulgaria.

18 April 2021 24	Levski Sofia	0–3	Ludogorets Razgrad	Sofia
20:45 EEST		Report	Keșerü 8'; Cauly 11', 77'; Cicinho (yellow card) 76'; Wanderson (yellow card) 80'; Nedyalkov (yellow card) 90+1'	Stadium: Vivacom Arena - Georgi Asparuhov; Attendance: 0 Referee: Valentin Zhelezov (Burgas); Man of the Match: Cauly
Note: The match was played behind closed doors due to the ongoing COVID-19 pandemic in Bulgaria.

21 April 2021 25	Lokomotiv Plovdiv	1–0	Levski Sofia	Plovdiv
20:30 EEST	Malembana (yellow card) 42'; Ilić 49'; Karagaren (yellow card) 85'	Report	Steven (yellow card) 56'; Dasquet (yellow card) 66'	Stadium: Lokomotiv; Attendance: 0 Referee: Dragomir Draganov (Varna); Man of the Match: Birsent Karagaren
Note: The match was played behind closed doors due to the ongoing COVID-19 pandemic in Bulgaria.

25 April 2021 26	Levski Sofia	0–2	CSKA Sofia	Sofia
17:00 EEST	M. D. Petkov (yellow card) 27'; Aleksandrov (yellow card) 71'; Mihajlović (yellow card) 71'; Naydenov (yellow card) 74'; I. Dimitrov (red card) 90+2'	Report	Keita 14'; Caicedo 37'; Koch (yellow card) 54'; Carey (yellow card) 74'	Stadium: Vasil Levski National Stadium; Attendance: 4,000; Referee: Ivaylo Stoyanov (Petrich); Man of the Match: Federico Varela

==== Europa Conference League stage ====
===== League table =====
Pos	Team	Pld	W	D	L	GF	GA	GD	Pts	Qualification
1	Cherno More	32	12	9	11	37	34	+3	45	Qualification for the Europa Conference League play-off
2	Levski Sofia	32	11	8	13	34	32	+2	41	
3	Tsarsko Selo	32	9	10	13	33	39	−6	37	
4	Botev Plovdiv	32	7	11	14	34	52	−18	32	

Source: Bulgarian Football
Rules for classification: 1) Points; 2) Head-to-head points; 3) Head-to-head goal difference; 4) Head-to-head goals scored; 5) Head-to-head away goals scored (only if two teams); 6) Goal difference; 7) Goals scored; 8) Fairplay ranking; 9) Draw.

===== Results summary =====
Overall								Home						Away					
Pld	W	D	L	GF	GA	GD	Pts	W	D	L	GF	GA	GD	W	D	L	GF	GA	GD
6	4	1	1	9	5	+4	13	1	1	1	4	4	0	3	0	0	5	1	+4

Last updated: 23 May 2021.
Source: See Results

===== Results by round =====
Round	1	2	3	4	5	6
Ground	A	A	H	H	H	A
Result	W	W	W	D	L	W
Position	9	9	8	8	8	8

Source: See results
A = Away; H = Home; W = Win; D = Draw; L = Loss

===== Matches =====
5 May 2021 27	Tsarsko Selo	0–2	Levski Sofia	Sofia
19:45 EEST	Daskalov (yellow card) 26'; Popadiyn (yellow card) 43'; Kavdanski (yellow card) 57'; Anderson (yellow card) 64'	Report	M. Petkov 9'; B. Tsonev 88'	Stadium: Arena Tsarsko Selo; Attendance: 300; Referee: Nikola Popov (Sofia); Man of the Match: Marin Petkov

9 May 2021 28	Botev Plovdiv	0–1	Levski Sofia	Plovdiv
20:45 EEST	Johnathan (yellow card) 62'; Marquinhos (yellow card) 72'	Report	M. Petkov 21', (yellow card) 21'; Kraev (yellow card) 74'	Stadium: Botev 1912 Football Complex; Attendance: 1,300; Referee: Vasimir El-Hatib (Sofia); Man of the Match: Nikolay Mihaylov

13 May 2021 29	Levski Sofia	2–1	Cherno More	Sofia
20:00 EEST	Z. Dimitrov (yellow card) 13'; Monsalve 43'; Raynov (yellow card) 73'; Atanasov 78'; B. Tsonev (yellow card) 82'	Report	Iliev Jr. 41'; Álvarez (yellow card) 74'; Panayotov (yellow card) 79'; Iliev (yellow card) 79'	Stadium: Vivacom Arena - Georgi Asparuhov; Attendance: 1,000; Referee: Radoslav Gidzhenov (Plovdiv); Man of the Match: Martin Raynov

17 May 2021 30	Levski Sofia	1–1	Tsarsko Selo	Sofia
20:00 EEST	Mihajlović (yellow card) 11'; R. Tsonev (yellow card) 69'; B. Tsonev 73' (pen.), (yellow card) 84'; Raynov (yellow card) 80'	Report	Popadiyn (yellow card) 7'; Baltanov (yellow card) 32'; Anderson (yellow card) 43', (goal) 63'; Bandalovski (yellow card) 84' de Sa (yellow card) 90+1'; Placide (yellow card) 90+2'	Stadium: Vivacom Arena - Georgi Asparuhov; Attendance: 2,200; Referee: Ivelin Zanev (Ruse); Man of the Match: Zvonimir Mikulić

20 May 2021 31	Levski Sofia	1–2	Botev Plovdiv	Sofia
20:00 EEST	Atanasov 4'; Naydenov (yellow card) 66'; Raynov (yellow card) 90+2'	Report	Johnathan (yellow card) 43'; Toku 46', 49'; Cikarski (yellow card) 80'; Argilashki (yellow card) 90'	Stadium: Vivacom Arena - Georgi Asparuhov; Attendance: 1,000; Referee: Georgi Ivanov (Sofia); Man of the Match: Emmanuel Toku

23 May 2021 32	Cherno More	1–2	Levski Sofia	Varna
20:00 EEST	Panayotov 17'; Dimov (yellow card) 75'; Popov (yellow card) 78'	Report	M. Petkov (yellow card) 43'; R. Tsonev 69', (yellow card) 72'; Bojinov 89'	Stadium: Ticha; Attendance: 2,000; Referee: Ivaylo Stoyanov (Petrich); Man of the Match: Nikolay Mihaylov

=== Bulgarian Cup ===
21 October 2020 Round of 32	Partizan Cherven Bryag	1–4	Levski Sofia	Cherven Bryag
14:30 EEST	L. Ivanov 34'; Tonev (yellow card) 45+1'	Report	Bojinov 36'; Z. Dimitrov 42'; D. Ivanov (yellow card) 44'; P. Petkov 65' (o.g.); M. D. Petkov 85'	Stadium: Gradski; Attendance: 1,000; Referee: Dimitar Dimitrov (Sofia)

3 March 2021 Round of 16	Levski Sofia	3–1	Beroe	Sofia
18:00 EET	Rherras (yellow card) 26'; Dasquet (yellow card) 32'; Robertha 38', 65' (pen.), 90+2', (yellow card) 68'; M. D. Petkov (yellow card) 87'	Report	Kamburov 27' (pen.); Hassani (yellow card) 55'; Ohene (red card) 61'; Mézague (yellow card) 67'; Makouta (yellow card) 74'	Stadium: Vivacom Arena - Georgi Asparuhov; Attendance: 0 Referee: Stanislav Todorov (Shumen)
Note: The match was played behind closed doors due to the ongoing COVID-19 pandemic in Bulgaria.

17 March 2021 Quarterfinal	Slavia Sofia	2–1	Levski Sofia	Sofia
18:30 EET	Rangelov (yellow card) 23'; Valchev (yellow card) 33'; Patev (yellow card) 35'; Makrillos (yellow card) 39', (goal) 77'; Ghandri (yellow card) 50'; Krastev 89', (yellow card) 90'	Report	Yurukov (yellow card) 30'; Raynov (yellow card) 65'; M. Petkov 86'	Stadium: Slavia; Attendance: 0 Referee: Radoslav Gidzhenov (Plovdiv)
Note: The match was played behind closed doors due to the ongoing COVID-19 pandemic in Bulgaria.

== Squad statistics ==
As of 23 May 2021

No.	Pos	Nat	Player	Total		Parva Liga		Bulgarian Cup	
No.	Pos	Nat	Player	Apps	Goals	Apps	Goals	Apps	Goals
1	GK	(Croatia) CRO	Zvonimir Mikulić	15	0	13	0	2	0
3	DF	(Bulgaria) BUL	Zhivko Atanasov	30	4	28	4	1+1	0
4	MF	(Bulgaria) BUL	Martin Raynov	24	1	22	1	2	0
6	DF	(Bulgaria) BUL	Ivaylo Naydenov	29	1	27	1	2	0
8	MF	(Bulgaria) BUL	Simeon Slavchev	8	0	2+5	0	1	0
9	FW	(Bulgaria) BUL	Steven Petkov	17	1	3+11	1	1+2	0
10	MF	(Bulgaria) BUL	Borislav Tsonev	10	6	4+6	6	0	0
11	MF	(Bulgaria) BUL	Zdravko Dimitrov	29	2	21+6	1	2	1
12	GK	(Bulgaria) BUL	Nikolay Krastev	2	0	1	0	1	0
13	GK	(Bulgaria) BUL	Nikolay Mihaylov	18	0	18	0	0	0
14	DF	(Bulgaria) BUL	Mateo Stamatov	13	0	10+2	0	0+1	0
15	DF	(Bulgaria) BUL	Bogdan Kostov	0	0	0	0	0	0
19	FW	(Morocco) MAR	Bilal Bari	16	0	6+9	0	1	0
20	DF	(Spain) ESP	Nacho Monsalve	12	1	9+2	1	1	0
21	MF	(Bulgaria) BUL	Radoslav Tsonev	6	1	2+4	1	0	0
22	DF	(Bulgaria) BUL	Patrick-Gabriel Galchev	17	0	12+4	0	1	0
27	MF	(Bulgaria) BUL	Asen Mitkov	1	0	1	0	0	0
31	DF	(Bulgaria) BUL	Kostadin Iliev	1	0	0	0	1	0
41	DF	(Bulgaria) BUL	Georgi Aleksandrov	11	0	8+2	0	1	0
45	FW	(Bulgaria) BUL	Iliya Dimitrov	8	0	1+6	0	0+1	0
66	GK	(Bulgaria) BUL	Plamen Andreev	1	0	0+1	0	0	0
70	MF	(Bulgaria) BUL	Ivaylo Hristov	0	0	0	0	0	0
77	MF	(Bulgaria) BUL	Iliya Yurukov	21	0	14+5	0	2	0
79	FW	(Bulgaria) BUL	Martin D. Petkov	23	2	12+8	1	3	1
86	FW	(Bulgaria) BUL	Valeri Bojinov	11	2	0+10	1	1	1
88	MF	(Bulgaria) BUL	Marin Petkov	17	3	7+8	2	1+1	1
89	MF	(Bulgaria) BUL	Andrian Kraev	13	0	11+2	0	0	0
91	DF	(Switzerland) SUI	Dragan Mihajlović	15	0	13	0	1+1	0
99	MF	(Bulgaria) BUL	Nikolay Arahangelov	0	0	0	0	0	0
Players away from the club on loan:
12	GK	(Bulgaria) BUL	Petar Ivanov	0	0	0	0	0	0
33	GK	(Bulgaria) BUL	Ivan Andonov	0	0	0	0	0	0
Players who left the club during the season:
2	DF	(Bulgaria) BUL	Alex Petkov	13	0	12	0	0+1	0
5	DF	(Iraq) IRQ	Rebin Sulaka	5	0	4	0	1	0
7	MF	(Brazil) BRA	Paulinho	14	4	13+1	4	0	0
17	FW	(Netherlands) NED	Nigel Robertha	21	9	18+1	6	2	3
18	MF	(Ghana) GHA	Nasiru Mohammed	21	1	9+9	1	0+3	0
23	DF	(Morocco) MAR	Faycal Rherras	8	0	6+1	0	1	0
28	MF	(France) FRA	Thomas Dasquet	27	0	21+3	0	2+1	0
39	DF	(Bulgaria) BUL	Deyan Ivanov	5	0	0+4	0	1	0
40	MF	(Netherlands) NED	Stijn Spierings	7	2	7	2	0	0
66	DF	(Bulgaria) BUL	Orlin Starokin	12	0	10+1	0	1	0
99	MF	(Bulgaria) BUL	Stanislav Ivanov	12	1	8+4	1	0	0
