= List of Bulgarian football transfers winter 2021–22 =

Bulgarian football transfers

== First League ==
=== Arda ===
In:

No.	Pos.	Nation	Player
1	GK	BUL	Hristiyan Vasilev (from Tsarsko Selo)
5	DF	BUL	Petko Ganev (loan return from Litex)
20	FW	MLI	Lassana N'Diaye (on loan from (Russia) CSKA Moscow)
21	DF	BUL	Martin Kostadinov (loan return from Botev Vratsa)

Out:

No.	Pos.	Nation	Player
9	FW	BUL	Spas Delev (to Ludogorets)
12	GK	BUL	Ivan Karadzhov (to CSKA 1948)
18	DF	SRB	Slobodan Rubežić (to (Serbia) Novi Pazar)
37	FW	BRA	Juninho (to CSKA 1948)
71	DF	BUL	Plamen Krumov (to Tsarsko Selo)

=== Beroe ===
In:

No.	Pos.	Nation	Player
5	DF	TUN	Syam Ben Youssef (from (Romania) CFR Cluj)
6	MF	FRA	Kevin Tapoko (on loan from (Israel) Hapoel Haifa)
18	MF	SUI	Davide Mariani (from (United Arab Emirates) Shabab Al Ahli)
26	DF	ISR	Amit Bitton (from (Israel) Hapoel Be'er Sheva)

Out:

No.	Pos.	Nation	Player
1	GK	NED	Nordin Bakker (to (Netherlands) Almere City)
5	DF	CIV	Oumar Sako (to (Austria) LASK)
6	MF	BUL	Aleksandar Tsvetkov (to (Romania) Academica Clinceni)
7	FW	CPV	Kukula (to (Portugal) Covilhã)
8	MF	BUL	Iliyan Stefanov (to Levski Sofia)
9	FW	BUL	Martin Kamburov (retired)
13	FW	BUL	Nikola Marinov (released)
17	MF	BUL	Reyan Daskalov (to CSKA 1948)
19	DF	BUL	Aleksandar Vasilev (to Lokomotiv Plovdiv)
26	DF	BUL	Kamen Hadzhiev (to (Uzbekistan) Pakhtakor Tashkent)
91	FW	BUL	Oldzhay Aliev (to Levski Krumovgrad)

=== Botev Plovdiv ===
In:

No.	Pos.	Nation	Player
—	FW	NED	Saïd Hamulic (from (Lithuania) DFK Dainava)
9	MF	FRA	Mohamed Brahimi (from Pirin Blagoevgrad)
20	MF	BUL	Lachezar Baltanov (free agent)
24	DF	CRO	Roberto Punčec (free agent)
26	FW	SWE	Jack Lahne (on loan from (France) Amiens)

Out:

No.	Pos.	Nation	Player
7	FW	BRA	Marquinhos (loan return to (Brazil) Atlético Mineiro)
26	DF	MKD	Mite Cikarski (released)
—	FW	NED	Saïd Hamulic (to (Lithuania) FK Sūduva)

=== Botev Vratsa ===
In:

No.	Pos.	Nation	Player
14	FW	NED	Anton Fase (free agent)
16	MF	BUL	Martin Petkov (from Etar)
20	FW	FRA	Mohamed Bentahar (free agent)
23	DF	BUL	Dimitar Iliev (from CSKA 1948)
—	MF	GUA	José Pablo Grajeda (from (Spain) S.S. Reyes)
—	DF	COL	Tomás Maya (free agent)

Out:

No.	Pos.	Nation	Player
9	FW	BUL	Georgi Nikolov (to Sportist Svoge)
16	MF	BRA	Matheus Cassini (to (United States) Forward Madison)
19	DF	BUL	Martin Kostadinov (loan return to Arda)
20	FW	MKD	Dorian Babunski (to (Hungary) Debrecen)
21	MF	POR	Serginho (to (Spain) Melilla)
23	MF	BUL	Ivan Mitrev (loan return to CSKA Sofia)
30	DF	POR	Gonçalo Vieira (to (Lithuania) Banga)
34	GK	BUL	Nikolay Krastev (released)

=== Cherno More ===
In:

No.	Pos.	Nation	Player
8	MF	ALG	Mazire Soula (from (Algeria) USM Alger)
19	FW	MTQ	Mathias Coureur (from (India) NorthEast United)
30	FW	LTU	Julius Kasparavičius (from (Lithuania) Nevėžis)
31	FW	ALG	Zakaria Benchaâ (from (Algeria) USM Alger)

Out:

No.	Pos.	Nation	Player
11	FW	GUI	Fodé Guirassy (to (France) Canet Roussillon)
15	MF	POR	Leandro Andrade (to (Azerbaijan) Qarabağ)
20	FW	POR	Zé Gomes (released)
26	GK	BUL	Ivan Dichevski (to Spartak Varna)
31	MF	BUL	Lachezar Yordanov (on loan to Dobrudzha)
92	FW	CUW	Gevaro Nepomuceno (released)

=== CSKA Sofia ===
In:

No.	Pos.	Nation	Player
22	DF	LUX	Enes Mahmutovic (from (Ukraine) Lviv)
27	FW	BRA	Maurício Garcez (on loan from (Brazil) Brusque)
28	FW	COL	Brayan Moreno (from (Colombia) Atlético Huila)
—	MF	BUL	Ivan Mitrev (loan return from Botev Vratsa)

Out:

No.	Pos.	Nation	Player
11	FW	BIH	Hamza Čataković (to (Bosnia and Herzegovina) Sarajevo)
20	DF	EST	Karol Mets (to (Switzerland) Zürich)
28	DF	BUL	Plamen Galabov (to (Israel) Maccabi Netanya)
—	MF	BUL	Ivan Mitrev (on loan to Litex)

=== CSKA 1948 ===
In:

No.	Pos.	Nation	Player
9	FW	BUL	Aleksandar Kolev (from (Poland) Stal Mielec)
12	GK	BUL	Ivan Karadzhov (from Arda)
14	MF	BUL	Vasil Shopov (from Tsarsko Selo)
15	DF	BUL	Sasho Aleksandrov (from Tsarsko Selo)
21	DF	BUL	Ventsislav Vasilev (from Tsarsko Selo)
22	DF	BUL	Reyan Daskalov (from Beroe)
27	MF	GHA	Carlos Ohene (from Tsarsko Selo)
45	MF	FRA	Daudet N'Dongala (from Sportist Svoge)
—	FW	BUL	Martin Toshev (from (Kazakhstan) Shakhter Karagandy)

Out:

No.	Pos.	Nation	Player
22	DF	BUL	Dimitar Iliev (to Botev Vratsa)

=== Levski Sofia ===
In:

No.	Pos.	Nation	Player
5	DF	NED	Kellian van der Kaap (from (Denmark) Viborg)
6	DF	BRA	Wenderson Tsunami (from (Brazil) Botafogo-PB)
14	MF	BUL	Iliyan Stefanov (from Beroe)
17	FW	BRA	Welton Felipe (from (Brazil) Botafogo-PB)
23	DF	GAM	Noah Sonko Sundberg (from (Sweden) Östersund)
30	MF	BUL	Filip Krastev (on loan from (Belgium) Lommel)

Out:

No.	Pos.	Nation	Player
3	DF	MKD	Gjoko Zajkov (to (Ukraine) Vorskla Poltava)
5	DF	CYP	Christos Shelis (to (Greece) Volos)
6	DF	BUL	Ivaylo Naydenov (to Hebar)
8	MF	BUL	Simeon Slavchev (to Lokomotiv Sofia)
10	MF	BUL	Borislav Tsonev (to (Ukraine) Chornomorets Odesa)
14	DF	BUL	Denis Dinev (on loan to Yantra)
41	DF	BUL	Georgi Aleksandrov (to Etar)
79	FW	BUL	Martin Petkov (to (Ukraine) Chornomorets Odesa)

=== Lokomotiv Plovdiv ===
In:

No.	Pos.	Nation	Player
—	FW	BUL	Ivaylo Dimitrov (from Minyor Pernik)
—	DF	BUL	Aleksandar Vasilev (from Beroe)
—	MF	BUL	Hristo Ivanov (from Lokomotiv Sofia)
—	FW	BUL	Preslav Borukov (from (Hungary) Zalaegerszegi)

Out:

No.	Pos.	Nation	Player
2	DF	UKR	Oleksiy Bykov (loan return to (Ukraine) Mariupol)
7	MF	NED	Shaquill Sno (released)
11	MF	ENG	Connor Ruane (to (Spain) Linense)
19	FW	BUL	Aleksandar Ivanov (to Slavia Sofia)
44	DF	BUL	Nikolay Nikolaev (on loan to Tsarsko Selo)

=== Lokomotiv Sofia ===
In:

No.	Pos.	Nation	Player
—	GK	BUL	Damyan Damyanov (from Ludogorets II)
—	DF	BUL	Ivan-Ioannis Atanatos (from Slavia Sofia)
—	MF	BUL	Simeon Slavchev (from Levski Sofia)
—	FW	BUL	Dimitar Mitkov (from Ludogorets)
—	DF	MOZ	David Malembana (Free agent)

Out:

No.	Pos.	Nation	Player
1	GK	BUL	Tsvetomir Vitkov (released)
8	MF	BUL	Hristo Ivanov (to Lokomotiv Plovdiv)
9	FW	ALG	Karim Bouhmidi (released)
11	FW	SUI	Raël Lolala (to (Iraq) Al-Quwa Al-Jawiya)
14	MF	BUL	Hristiyan Chipev (to Yantra)

=== Ludogorets ===
In:

No.	Pos.	Nation	Player
10	FW	ARG	Matías Tissera (from (Argentina) Platense)
12	GK	CRO	Simon Sluga (from (England) Luton Town)
21	DF	SVN	Žan Karničnik (from (Slovenia) Mura)
73	FW	BRA	Rick (from (Brazil) Ceará)
90	FW	BUL	Spas Delev (from Arda)
99	FW	BRA	Júnior Brandão (loan return from (Brazil) CRB)

Out:

No.	Pos.	Nation	Player
10	FW	NED	Elvis Manu (released)
13	FW	CGO	Mavis Tchibota (to (Israel) Maccabi Haifa)
25	MF	SEN	Stéphane Badji (to (Turkey) Eyüpspor)
29	MF	ROU	Dorin Rotariu (on loan to (Greece) Atromitos)
32	DF	POR	Josué Sá (on loan to (Israel) Maccabi Tel Aviv)
45	FW	BUL	Dimitar Mitkov (to Lokomotiv Sofia)
71	GK	CRO	Kristijan Kahlina (to (United States) Charlotte FC)

=== Pirin Blagoevgrad ===
In:

No.	Pos.	Nation	Player
1	GK	BUL	Mario Kirev (free agent)
10	MF	JPN	Kazuki Takahashi (from (Sweden) Eskilstuna)
21	GK	BUL	Yanko Georgiev (from Tsarsko Selo)

Out:

No.	Pos.	Nation	Player
2	DF	BRA	Pedro Ferrari (to (Italy) Ambrosiana)
7	MF	FRA	Mohamed Brahimi (to Botev Plovdiv)
12	GK	NED	Nick Hengelman (to (Netherlands) Go Ahead Eagles)
25	FW	GEO	Guram Goshteliani (to (Georgia (country)) Telavi)
44	MF	IRL	Conor Henderson (released)
99	GK	BUL	Petar Petrov (to Montana)

=== Slavia Sofia ===
In:

No.	Pos.	Nation	Player
—	GK	BUL	Stefan Dafovski (from Rodopa Smolyan)
—	DF	BUL	Hristo Popadiyn (from Tsarsko Selo)
—	MF	ESP	Jon Bakero (from (United States) Phoenix Rising)
—	FW	BUL	Aleksandar Ivanov (from Lokomotiv Plovdiv)
—	MF	BUL	Toni Ivanov (loan return from Yantra)
—	MF	BUL	Filip Angelov (loan return from Marek)

Out:

No.	Pos.	Nation	Player
6	DF	BUL	Kostadin Velkov (to Balkan Botevgrad)
7	MF	AUS	Peter Makrillos (released)
12	GK	BUL	Ivan Dermendzhiev (to Tsarsko Selo)
20	DF	CRO	Marko Iharoš (to (Austria) Kapfenberger SV)
55	DF	BUL	Andrea Hristov (to (Italy) Cosenza)
—	MF	BUL	Toni Ivanov (to Yantra)
—	MF	BUL	Filip Angelov (on loan to Tsarsko Selo)

=== Tsarsko Selo ===
In:

No.	Pos.	Nation	Player
—	DF	BUL	Plamen Krumov (from Arda)
—	DF	BUL	Nikolay Nikolaev (on loan from Lokomotiv Plovdiv)
—	MF	BUL	Filip Angelov (on loan from Slavia Sofia)
—	MF	BUL	Lachezar Georgiev (from Levski Lom)
—	MF	BUL	Hari Denkov (from CSKA 1948 II)
—	FW	BUL	Andrey Yordanov (from CSKA 1948 II)
—	FW	BUL	Ventsislav Hristov (from Sozopol)
—	MF	ALB	Redi Kasa (from Septemvri Sofia)
—	MF	SUI	Valentino Pugliese (free agent)
—	GK	SEN	Khadim Ndiaye (from (Italy) Atalanta)
—	FW	BRA	Lucas Willian (from (South Korea) Gimhae)
—	MF	ITA	Sedrick Kalombo (from (Italy) Salernitana)
—	DF	ITA	Matteo Lucarelli (from (Italy) Parma)
—	MF	CIV	Pierre Zebli (from (Italy) Cattolica)
—	MF	FRA	Jeremy Petris (from (Italy) Crotone)
—	MF	ITA	Felipe Ronchetti (from (Switzerland) Chiasso)
—	MF	ITA	Davide Masella (on loan from (Italy) Benevento)
—	DF	ITA	Alessandro Coppola (on loan from (Italy) Triestina)
—	MF	ITA	Stefano Palmucci (on loan from (Italy) Parma)
—	DF	ITA	Alessandro Martella (on loan from (Italy) Parma)
—	MF	GER	Sidnei Baldé Djaló (free agent)
—	DF	ITA	Davide Vitturini (Free agent)
—	FW	GAM	Yaffa Yusupha (free agent)

Out:

No.	Pos.	Nation	Player
1	GK	BUL	Yanko Georgiev (to Pirin Blagoevgrad)
3	DF	BUL	Martin Kavdanski (released)
4	DF	BUL	Dilyan Georgiev (to Oborishte Panagyurishte)
6	DF	BUL	Ivan Bandalovski (released)
7	MF	BUL	Dimo Bakalov (released)
8	MF	SRB	Alen Stevanović (to (Serbia) IMT Belgrad)
9	FW	BUL	Milcho Angelov (released)
10	MF	BUL	Lachezar Baltanov (to Botev Plovdiv)
12	MF	BRA	Lucas Dias (released)
20	FW	BUL	Petar Atanasov (to Maritsa Plovdiv)
21	DF	BUL	Ventsislav Vasilev (to CSKA 1948)
22	MF	SRB	Milan Jokić (to (Serbia) Novi Pazar)
25	DF	BUL	Sasho Aleksandrov (to CSKA 1948)
29	FW	GAB	Gaëtan Missi Mezu (released)
30	GK	BUL	Hristiyan Vasilev (to Arda)
77	DF	FRA	Louis Nganioni (released)
80	MF	GHA	Carlos Ohene (to CSKA 1948)
83	DF	BUL	Hristo Popadiyn (to Slavia Sofia)
88	MF	BUL	Nikola Kolev (to Yantra)
93	MF	BUL	Vasil Shopov (to CSKA 1948)

== Second League ==
=== Botev Plovdiv II ===
In:

No.	Pos.	Nation	Player

Out:

No.	Pos.	Nation	Player

=== CSKA 1948 II ===
In:

No.	Pos.	Nation	Player
—	MF	BUL	Stoyan Stoichkov (from Septemvri Sofia)
—	MF	BUL	Ivan Avramov (from Septemvri Sofia)

Out:

No.	Pos.	Nation	Player
—	DF	BUL	Mariyan Dimitrov (to Sozopol)

=== Dobrudzha ===
In:

No.	Pos.	Nation	Player
—	MF	BUL	Ivaylo Lazarov (from Neftochimic)
—	MF	BUL	Lachezar Yordanov (on loan from Cherno More)

Out:

No.	Pos.	Nation	Player

=== Etar ===
In:

No.	Pos.	Nation	Player
—	MF	BUL	Tsvetomir Todorov (from Bdin Vidin)
—	DF	BUL	Georgi Aleksandrov (from Levski Sofia)

Out:

No.	Pos.	Nation	Player
16	MF	BUL	Martin Petkov (to Botev Vratsa)
18	MF	ARG	Nicolás Femia (to (Argentina) Sarmiento)

=== Hebar ===
In:

No.	Pos.	Nation	Player
—	DF	BUL	Ivaylo Naydenov (from Levski Sofia)
—	FW	BUL	Kitan Vasilev (from Septemvri Simitli)

Out:

No.	Pos.	Nation	Player

=== Levski Lom ===
In:

No.	Pos.	Nation	Player

Out:

No.	Pos.	Nation	Player
15	MF	BUL	Lachezar Georgiev (to Tsarsko Selo)

=== Litex Lovech ===
In:

No.	Pos.	Nation	Player

Out:

No.	Pos.	Nation	Player
5	DF	BUL	Petko Ganev (loan return to Arda)

=== Ludogorets II ===
In:

No.	Pos.	Nation	Player

Out:

No.	Pos.	Nation	Player
34	GK	BUL	Damyan Damyanov (to Lokomotiv Sofia)

=== Marek Dupnitsa ===
In:

No.	Pos.	Nation	Player

Out:

No.	Pos.	Nation	Player
17	MF	BUL	Dimitar Atanasov (to Sportist Svoge)

=== Maritsa ===
In:

No.	Pos.	Nation	Player
—	FW	BUL	Petar Atanasov (from Tsarsko Selo)

Out:

No.	Pos.	Nation	Player

=== Minyor Pernik ===
In:

No.	Pos.	Nation	Player
—	FW	BUL	Zapro Dinev (from Septemvri Simitli)

Out:

No.	Pos.	Nation	Player
17	MF	BUL	Ivan Valchanov (released)
10	FW	BUL	Ivaylo Dimitrov (to Lokomotiv Plovdiv)

=== Montana ===
In:

No.	Pos.	Nation	Player
—	GK	BUL	Petar Petrov (from Pirin Blagoevgrad)

Out:

No.	Pos.	Nation	Player

=== Septemvri Simitli ===
In:

No.	Pos.	Nation	Player

Out:

No.	Pos.	Nation	Player
3	DF	BUL	Iliya Munin (to Bansko)
11	FW	BUL	Kitan Vasilev (to Hebar)
17	FW	BUL	Zapro Dinev (to Minyor Pernik)
88	FW	BUL	Daniel Gogov (released)
—	MF	BUL	Veselin Lyubomirov (to Spartak Varna)

=== Septemvri Sofia ===
In:

No.	Pos.	Nation	Player
—	GK	BUL	Dimitar Sheytanov (free agent)
—	FW	BUL	Valeri Bojinov (free agent)

Out:

No.	Pos.	Nation	Player
3	MF	BUL	Stoyan Stoichkov (to CSKA 1948 II)
19	MF	ALB	Redi Kasa (to Tsarsko Selo)
26	MF	BUL	Ivan Avramov (to CSKA 1948 II)
—	GK	BUL	Ivan Vasilev (released)

=== Sozopol ===
In:

No.	Pos.	Nation	Player
—	DF	BUL	Mariyan Dimitrov (from CSKA 1948 II)
—	FW	BUL	Ventsislav Slavov (from Yantra)

Out:

No.	Pos.	Nation	Player
7	FW	BUL	Ventsislav Hristov (to Tsarsko Selo)

=== Spartak Varna ===
In:

No.	Pos.	Nation	Player
—	MF	BUL	Veselin Lyubomirov (from Septemvri Simitli)
—	FW	BUL	Georgi Chukalov (from Ludogorets II)
—	DF	BUL	Martin Vasilev (from Chavdar Etropole)
—	DF	BUL	Petar Patev (from (Tajikistan) Istiklol)
—	MF	MDA	Laur Chitanu (from (Moldova) Florești)

Out:

No.	Pos.	Nation	Player
22	MF	BUL	Aleksandar Stefanov (to Dobrudzha Dobrich)
24	FW	BUL	Georgi Bozhilov (released)
30	MF	NED	Dylan George (released)

=== Sportist Svoge ===
In:

No.	Pos.	Nation	Player
—	FW	BUL	Georgi Nikolov (from Botev Vratsa)
—	MF	BUL	Dimitar Atanasov (from Marek Dupnitsa)

Out:

No.	Pos.	Nation	Player
8	FW	BUL	Radoslav Vasilev (retired)
15	FW	BUL	Dimitar Aleksiev (to Sayana Haskovo)
18	FW	BUL	Deyan Hristov (released)
22	MF	FRA	Daudet N'Dongala (to CSKA 1948)

=== Strumska Slava ===
In:

No.	Pos.	Nation	Player

Out:

No.	Pos.	Nation	Player
33	FW	GRE	Giorgos Efstratiadis (released)

=== Yantra ===
In:

No.	Pos.	Nation	Player
71	MF	BUL	Toni Ivanov (from Slavia Sofia, previously on loan)
—	MF	BUL	Nikola Kolev (from Tsarsko Selo)
—	MF	BUL	Hristiyan Chipev (from Lokomotiv Sofia)

Out:

No.	Pos.	Nation	Player
18	FW	BUL	Ventsislav Slavov (to Sozopol)
—	MF	BUL	Vasil Parvanov (released)
