= Stanimir Stoilov =

Bulgarian footballer and manager

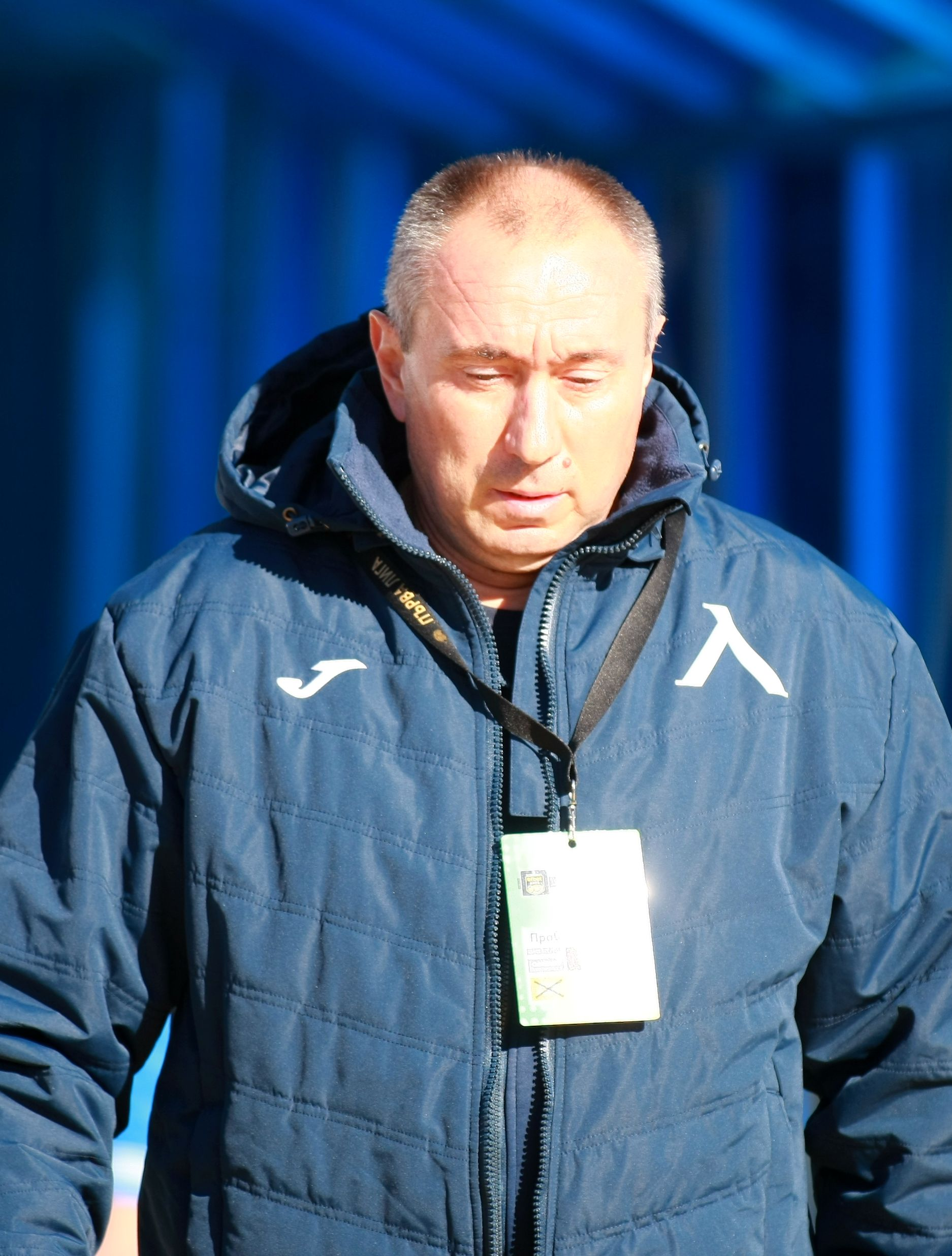
- Stoilov in 2022

Personal information
- Full name: Stanimir Kolev Stoilov
- Date of birth: 13 February 1967 (age 59)
- Place of birth: Haskovo, Bulgaria
- Height: 1.80 m (5 ft 11 in)
- Positions: Midfielder; defender

Team information
- Current team: Göztepe (manager)

Youth career
- 1977–1986: Haskovo

Senior career*
Years	Team	Apps	(Gls)
1987–1990	Haskovo	101	(61)
1990–1992	Levski Sofia	56	(18)
1992–1993	Fenerbahçe	8	(3)
1994	CSKA Sofia	12	(4)
1994–1995	Levski Sofia	27	(13)
1995–1997	Campomaiorense	52	(19)
1997–1998	Slavia Sofia	29	(12)
1998–2003	Levski Sofia	111	(6)
Total		396	(136)

International career
1992–2000	Bulgaria	14	(3)

Managerial career
- 2004–2008: Levski Sofia
- 2007: Bulgaria
- 2008–2009: Litex Lovech
- 2009–2010: Bulgaria
- 2010–2011: Anorthosis Famagusta
- 2013–2014: Botev Plovdiv
- 2014–2018: Astana
- 2018–2019: Kazakhstan
- 2021–2023: Levski Sofia
- 2023–: Göztepe
- * Club domestic league appearances and goals

Stanimir Kolev Stoilov (Bulgarian: Станимир Колев Стоилов; born 13 February 1967) is a Bulgarian former footballer and football manager who is head coach of Göztepe in the Süper Lig. He is best known for two successful spells at Levski Sofia, reaching the 2005–06 UEFA Cup quarter-finals and, in 2006, taking Levski to the UEFA Champions League group stage for the first time in Bulgarian club history; domestically he won league titles in 2005–06 and 2006–07, the Bulgarian Cup in 2004–05 and 2006–07, and the Bulgarian Supercup in 2005 and 2007.

Abroad, Stoilov led FC Astana to multiple domestic honours and, in 2015, to the UEFA Champions League group stage—the first Kazakh club to do so—after eliminating NK Maribor, HJK Helsinki and APOEL. At international level he was caretaker of Bulgaria in June 2007 and head coach from 2009 to 2010, and later coached the Kazakhstan national football team (2018–2019), guiding them through the inaugural UEFA Nations League before being succeeded by Michal Bílek.

Since taking over Göztepe in November 2023, he won promotion to the Süper Lig in April 2024, led the club to the Turkish Cup semi-finals in 2024–25, and signed a contract extension in February 2025. As a player he appeared for Levski Sofia, Fenerbahçe, CSKA Sofia, S.C. Campomaiorense and Slavia Sofia, and earned 14 caps and three goals for Bulgaria between 1992 and 2000.

== Playing career ==
Stoilov began his senior career with FC Haskovo (1985–1990) before joining Levski Sofia (1990–1992). In 1992 he moved abroad to Fenerbahçe in Turkey, where he was registered with the club during the 1992–93 season as confirmed by the Turkish Football Federation database. He returned to Bulgaria in 1993 for a brief spell at CSKA Sofia (1993–1994) and rejoined Levski for 1994–95, before a two-year stint in Portugal with S.C. Campomaiorense (1995–1997). In the Portuguese top flight he made 31 league appearances and scored seven goals for Campomaiorense in 1995–96. He later played for Slavia Sofia (1997–1998) and finished his career back at Levski (1998–2003), where he served as club captain in his final spell. Primarily an attacking midfielder/forward, Stoilov earned 14 senior caps and scored three goals for the Bulgaria national football team between 1992 and 2000.

== Managerial career ==
=== Early career ===
In 2004, Stanimir Stoilov was appointed head coach of Levski Sofia. Under his management, Levski reached the quarter-finals of the 2005–06 UEFA Cup, and in August 2006 became the first Bulgarian club to qualify for the UEFA Champions League group stage. He also led the side to the Bulgarian league titles in 2005–06 and 2006–07, the Bulgarian Cup in 2004–05 and 2006–07, and the Bulgarian Supercup in 2005 and 2007.

In April 2007, Stanimir Stoilov was appointed caretaker of the Bulgaria national football team for two UEFA Euro 2008 qualifying matches against Belarus; Bulgaria won 2–0 in Minsk on 2 June and 2–1 in Sofia on 6 June.

On 7 May 2008, Levski Sofia dismissed Stoilov along with executive director Nasko Sirakov following the conclusion of the league campaign. Before the 2008–09 season he took over at Litex Lovech and won the Bulgarian Cup in May 2009, defeating Pirin Blagoevgrad 3–0 in the final; he resigned that August after Litex failed to reach the UEFA Europa League group stage.

=== Bulgaria ===
In January 2009, Stoilov was announced as Bulgaria’s head coach for the remainder of the 2010 FIFA World Cup qualifying cycle. Bulgaria finished outside the qualification places in Group 8; the campaign featured 1–1 draws home and away against the Republic of Ireland, a 4–1 away defeat to Cyprus, and a 6–2 home win over Georgia. He remained in charge into the UEFA Euro 2012 qualifying campaign but resigned after Bulgaria opened with defeats to England and Montenegro in September 2010.

In 2010, Bulgaria endured a poor run under Stoilov, losing five of six matches; the only positive result was a 1–1 friendly draw away to South Africa on 24 May. On 7 September 2010, Bulgaria were beaten 1–0 by Montenegro in Sofia in UEFA Euro 2012 qualifying; later that evening Stoilov announced his resignation as national coach.

=== Anorthosis, Botev Plovdiv & FC Astana; Kazakhstan (2010–2019) ===
Stoilov took charge of Anorthosis Famagusta in December 2010, inheriting a side struggling domestically; his appointment and targets (top-four finish and a cup run) were announced by UEFA at the time.

In December 2012 he was appointed head coach of Botev Plovdiv and made his debut on 1 March 2013 against Slavia Sofia. In the 2013–14 UEFA Europa League Botev came through qualifying to the play-off round, where they were eliminated by VfB Stuttgart on away goals (1–1 home, 0–0 away).

On 22 June 2014 he was appointed by FC Astana of the Kazakhstan Premier League. Astana won the league title in 2014, starting a run of domestic dominance under Stoilov, and in 2015 became the first club from Kazakhstan to reach the UEFA Champions League group stage. They eliminated NK Maribor and HJK Helsinki to reach the play-off, then knocked out APOEL (2–1 agg.).

In March 2018, after leaving Astana, Stoilov was appointed head coach of the Kazakhstan national football team. He led the side through the 2018–19 UEFA Nations League (League D, Group 1), finishing second behind Georgia, before his tenure ended in January 2019 when the Kazakhstan Football Federation appointed Michal Bílek as successor.

=== Levski Sofia ===
On 1 September 2021, Stoilov returned to Levski Sofia as head coach with the team 10th after six league matches (two wins, four losses) and in a difficult financial position. In his first week he released Simeon Slavchev, Valeri Bojinov and Hristo Hubchev, and signed José Córdoba (from Etar) and Dimitar Kostadinov (from Septemvri Sofia).

Levski improved immediately, taking 20 points by the winter break (5–5–3) and reaching the Bulgarian Cup quarter-finals after wins over Marek Dupnitsa and Septemvri Simitli. During the January window six players departed (including Gjoko Zajkov, Christos Shelis, Ivaylo Naydenov, Borislav Tsonov, Georgi Aleksandrov and Martin Petkov) and six arrived: defenders Kellian van der Kaap and Noah Sonko Sundberg; midfielders Iliyan Stefanov (from Beroe) and Filip Krastev (on loan from Lommel); and Brazilians Wenderson Tsunami (left-back) and Welton (forward).

In the spring, Levski went 11–2–2 in the league to finish fourth. In the cup they eliminated Septemvri Sofia in the quarter-finals, beat Ludogorets Razgrad 4–2 on aggregate in the semi-finals, and defeated CSKA Sofia 1–0 in the final with a long-range goal from Iliyan Stefanov. Goalkeeper Plamen Andreev started all six cup matches, conceding two goals (both in the first leg against Ludogorets).

=== Göztepe ===
On 21 November 2023, Stoilov was appointed head coach of Göztepe on a 2.5-year deal. He guided the İzmir club to automatic promotion from the TFF First League in 2023–24 with two rounds to spare, clinched by a 2–0 home win over Gençlerbirliği on 28 April 2024. In 2024–25 he led Göztepe to the Turkish Cup semi-finals, eliminating holders Beşiktaş 3–1 away in the quarter-finals before losing to Trabzonspor in the last four. On 22 February 2025, Göztepe announced that Stoilov’s contract had been extended through the end of the 2026–27 season, with an option for a further year.

== Coaching philosophy ==
Analysts describe Stoilov’s sides as organised and proactive, with emphasis on compact defending, quick progression and sustained possession in the opposition half. During Astana’s 2015–16 UEFA Champions League campaign his team were noted for discipline and structure, traits highlighted in contemporary coverage of Kazakhstan’s first group-stage appearance.

Stoilov has also spoken about expecting his teams to “play to win” and to show responsibility and initiative, comments he repeated on taking the Kazakhstan job and ahead of the inaugural UEFA Nations League.

He is regarded for integrating young players and late bloomers into senior roles. In his 2021–22 return to Levski Sofia he trusted 2004-born goalkeeper Plamen Andreev through the Bulgarian Cup run and built around recent arrivals such as Welton and Iliyan Stefanov; Levski ended a 13-year trophy drought by winning the 2022 final, decided by Stefanov’s goal.

== Career statistics ==
=== Club ===
Club performance			League		National cup (Note: Includes Bulgarian Cup)		Continental		Total	
Club	League	Season	Apps	Goals	Apps	Goals	Apps	Goals	Apps	Goals
Haskovo	B Group	1987–88	32	11	–		–		32	11
Haskovo	B Group	1988–89	33	23	–		–		33	23
Haskovo	B Group	1989–90	36	27	–		–		36	27
Haskovo	Total		101	61	–		–		101	61
Levski Sofia	A Group	1990–91	30	11	8	2	–		38	13
Levski Sofia	A Group	1991–92	26	7	9	7	1	0	36	14
Levski Sofia	Total		56	18	17	9	1	0	74	27
Fenerbahçe	1.Lig	1992–93	8	3	0	0	3 (Note: Appearances in UEFA Cup)	0	11	3
CSKA Sofia	A Group	1993–94	12	4	0	0	0	0	12	4
Levski Sofia	A Group	1994–95	27	13	2	1	2	1	31	15
Campomaiorense	Primeira Divisão	1995–96	31	7	–	–	–		31	7
Campomaiorense	Segunda Liga	1996–97	21	12	–	–	–		21	12
Campomaiorense	Total		52	19	2	1	–		52	19
Slavia Sofia	A Group	1997–98	29	12	?	?	–		29	12
Levski Sofia	A Group	1998–99	25	1	3	1	3 (Note: Appearances in UEFA Cup Winners' Cup)	0	31	2
Levski Sofia	A Group	1999–2000	25	3	5	0	5	0	35	3
Levski Sofia	A Group	2000–01	15	2	2	2	1 (Note: Appearance in UEFA Champions League)	0	18	4
Levski Sofia	A Group	2001–02	30	0	7	0	8 (Note: Six appearances in UEFA Champions League, two appearances in UEFA Cup)	0	45	0
Levski Sofia	A Group	2002–03	16	0	5	0	8 (Note: Four appearances in UEFA Champions League, four appearances in UEFA Cup)	0	29	0
Levski Sofia	Total		111	6	22	3	25	0	158	9
Career total			396	136	41	13	31	1	468	150

=== International ===
Bulgaria
Year	Apps	Goals
1992	3	2
1993	0	0
1994	2	0
1995	1	0
1996	0	0
1997	0	0
1998	0	0
1999	5	0
2000	2	1
Total	14	3

International goals

#	Date	Venue	Opponent	Score	Result	Competition
1.	26 August 1992	Hüseyin Avni Aker Stadium, Trabzon	Turkey	1–0	2–3	Friendly
2.	26 August 1992	Hüseyin Avni Aker Stadium, Trabzon	Turkey	2–3	2–3	Friendly
3.	12 February 2000	Estadio Playa Ancha, Valparaíso	Chile	2–3	2–3	Friendly

=== Managerial ===
As of match played 22 November 2026

Team	Nat	From	To	Record						
Team	Nat	From	To	G	W	D	L	F	A	Win %
Levski Sofia	(Bulgaria)	1 June 2004	6 May 2008	165	109	31	25	531	234	66.06
Bulgaria	(Bulgaria)	10 April 2007	6 June 2007	2	2	0	0	4	1	100.00
Litex Lovech	(Bulgaria)	1 July 2008	28 August 2009	23	11	6	6	32	23	47.83
Bulgaria	(Bulgaria)	1 January 2009	8 September 2010	14	3	4	7	18	22	21.43
Anorthosis Famagusta	(Cyprus)	27 December 2010	25 September 2011	31	18	6	7	50	21	58.06
Botev Plovdiv	(Bulgaria)	1 January 2013	4 June 2014	59	31	16	12	60	18	52.54
Astana	(Kazakhstan)	23 June 2014	31 December 2017	169	100	38	31	289	156	59.17
Kazakhstan	(Kazakhstan)	1 January 2018	17 January 2019	9	3	3	3	15	11	33.33
Levski Sofia	(Bulgaria)	1 September 2021	8 April 2023	61	32	17	12	89	37	52.46
Göztepe	(Turkey)	21 November 2023		113	53	32	28	183	119	46.90
Total				645	361	153	131	1,266	642	55.97

== Honours ==
=== Player ===
Levski Sofia

- Bulgarian League: 1994–95, 1999–2000, 2000–01, 2001–02
- Bulgarian Cup: 1990–91, 1991–92, 1999–2000, 2001–02, 2002–03

Individual

- Vtora Liga Top Goalscorer: 1989–90

=== Manager ===
Levski Sofia

- Bulgarian League: 2005–06, 2006–07
- Bulgarian Cup: 2004–05, 2006–07, 2021–22
- Bulgarian Supercup: 2005, 2007

Litex Lovech

- Bulgarian Cup: 2008–09

Astana

- Kazakhstan Premier League: 2014, 2015, 2016, 2017
- Kazakhstan Cup: 2016
- Kazakhstan Super Cup: 2015

Individual

- Football manager of the year in Bulgaria: 2017, 2022
