= 1989–90 B Group =

Season of the Bulgarian B Football Group

Bulgarian B Group
- Season: 1989–90
- Champions: Yantra
- Promoted: Yantra; Minyor; Haskovo
- Relegated: Ludogorets; Rila Dupnitsa; Vihren; Lokomotiv StZ; Tundzha; Shumen
- Matches: 380
- Goals: 1,077 (2.83 per match)
- Top goalscorer: (Bulgaria) Stanimir Stoilov (27 goals)

The 1989–90 B Group was the 34th season of the Bulgarian B Football Group, the second tier of the Bulgarian football league system. A total of 20 teams contested the league.

== League table ==
Pos	Team	Pld	W	D	L	GF	GA	GD	Pts	Promotion or relegation
1	Yantra Gabrovo (P)	38	22	8	8	68	35	+33	52	Promotion to 1990–91 A Group
2	Minyor Pernik (P)	38	21	8	9	73	39	+34	50	Promotion to 1990–91 A Group
3	Haskovo (P)	38	21	8	9	63	30	+33	50	Promotion to 1990–91 A Group
4	Spartak Varna	38	23	2	13	78	44	+34	48	
5	Bdin Vidin	38	19	7	12	62	41	+21	45	
6	Svetkavitsa Targovishte	38	16	7	15	62	50	+12	39	
7	Osam Lovech	38	18	3	17	65	54	+11	39	
8	Septemvriyska Slava Montana	38	16	7	15	57	52	+5	39	
9	Akademik Svishtov	38	18	3	17	50	50	0	39	
10	Rozova Dolina Kazanlak	38	18	3	17	57	61	−4	39	
11	Velbazhd Kyustendil	38	16	7	15	49	60	−11	39	
12	Spartak Pleven	38	18	2	18	73	71	+2	38	
13	Dobrudzha Dobrich	38	17	4	17	51	58	−7	38	
14	Cherveno Zname Pavlikeni	38	15	8	15	44	54	−10	38	
15	Ludogorets Razgrad (R)	38	14	8	16	43	56	−13	36	Relegation to 1990–91 V Group
16	Rila Dupnitsa (R)	38	13	8	17	47	46	+1	34	Relegation to 1990–91 V Group
17	Vihren Sandanski (R)	38	11	6	21	31	61	−30	28	Relegation to 1990–91 V Group
18	Lokomotiv Stara Zagora (R)	38	11	6	21	39	76	−37	28	Relegation to 1990–91 V Group
19	Tundzha Yambol (R)	38	8	7	23	32	67	−35	23	Relegation to 1990–91 V Group
20	Shumen (R)	38	6	6	26	33	72	−39	18	Relegation to 1990–91 V Group

Source: 1990-91 Football retro-football.bg
Rules for classification: 1) points; 2) goal difference; 3) number of goals scored.
(P) Promoted; (R) Relegated

== Top scorers ==
Rank	Scorer	Club	Goals
1	(Bulgaria) Stanimir Stoilov	Haskovo	27
2	(Bulgaria) Vercho Mitov	Minyor Pernik	20
2	(Bulgaria) Blagovest Petkov	Spartak Pleven	20
2	(Bulgaria) Krasimir Ibrishimov	Yantra Gabrovo	20
5	(Bulgaria) Todor Pramatarov	Septemvriyska Slava	18
5	(Bulgaria) Dimitar Trendafilov	Spartak Varna	18
5	(Bulgaria) Andriyan Gaydarski	Cherveno Zname	18
8	(Bulgaria) Toshko Borisov	Bdin Vidin	16
9	(Bulgaria) Nikolay Demirev	Lokomotiv Stara Zagora	14
10	(Bulgaria) Plamen Kazakov	Spartak Varna	13
10	(Bulgaria) Nikolay Bachvarov	Svetkavitsa	13
10	(Bulgaria) Atanas Stefanov	Dobrudzha Dobrich	13
10	(Bulgaria) Stanislav Vladimirov	Marek Dupnitsa	13
10	(Bulgaria) Simeon Krastev	Akademik Svishtov	13
10	(Bulgaria) Kancho Yordanov	Rozova dolina	13
16	(Bulgaria) Alexander Milushev	Velbazhd	12
16	(Bulgaria) Ivan Marinov	Velbazhd	12
16	(Bulgaria) Nikolay Markov	Svetkavitsa	12
19	(Bulgaria) Lyuben Brichev	Velbazhd	11
19	(Bulgaria) Plamen Linkov	Osam Lovech	11
19	(Bulgaria) Daniel Borimirov	Bdin Vidin	11
19	(Bulgaria) Alexander Pantaleev	Bdin Vidin	11
19	(Bulgaria) Valeri Dilov	Yantra Gabrovo	11
