= Atanas Kabov =

Bulgarian footballer

Personal information
- Full name: Atanas Vasilev Kabov
- Date of birth: 11 April 1999 (age 27)
- Place of birth: Plovdiv, Bulgaria
- Height: 1.70 m (5 ft 7 in)
- Position: Winger

Team information
- Current team: Arda Kardzhali
- Number: 11

Youth career
- 2006–2009: Vekta Plovdiv
- 2009–2010: Chavdar Etropole
- 2010–2017: Levski Sofia

Senior career*
Years	Team	Apps	(Gls)
2017–2020	Levski Sofia	8	(0)
2017–2018	→ Botev Vratsa (loan)	22	(0)
2019	→ Tsarsko Selo (loan)	12	(1)
2019–2020	→ Vitosha Bistritsa (loan)	24	(1)
2020	Slavia Sofia	7	(0)
2021–2023	Septemvri Sofia	76	(22)
2023–2025	Hebar Pazardzhik	47	(6)
2025	Sakaryaspor	11	(0)
2025–	Arda Kardzhali	26	(1)

International career^{‡}
2014–2015	Bulgaria U17	4	(2)
2017	Bulgaria U18	7	(5)
2017–2018	Bulgaria U19	5	(3)
2019–2020	Bulgaria U21	2	(0)
- * Club domestic league appearances and goals as of 11 June 2026 ‡ National team caps and goals as of 8 May 2021

Atanas Kabov (Bulgarian: Атанас Кабов; born 11 April 1999) is a Bulgarian professional footballer who plays as a winger for First League club Arda Kardzhali.

== Career ==
On 16 May 2017, Kabov made his first senior appearance for Levski, replacing Ivaylo Naydenov in 72nd minute as Levski lost 1–3 at home against Ludogorets Razgrad in the A Group.

In August 2017, Kabov joined Second League club Botev Vratsa on loan for the 2017–18 campaign.

On 28 January 2021 he moved from Slavia Sofia to Septemvri Sofia, signing a contract for an year and half.

In September 2025, Kabov signed a three-year contract with Arda Kardzhali.

== Career statistics ==
=== Club ===
As of 11 June 2026

Club performance			League		Cup		Continental		Other		Total	
Club	League	Season	Apps	Goals	Apps	Goals	Apps	Goals	Apps	Goals	Apps	Goals
Bulgaria			League		Bulgarian Cup		Europe		Other (Note: Includes Bulgarian Supercup matches.)		Total	
Levski Sofia	First League	2016–17	3	0	0	0	0	0	–		3	0
Levski Sofia	First League	2018–19	1	0	1	1	0	0	–		2	1
Levski Sofia	First League	2020–21	0	0	0	0	–		–		0	0
Levski Sofia	Total		4	0	1	1	0	0	0	0	5	1
Botev Vratsa (loan)	Second League	2017–18	18	0	1	0	–		–		19	0
Tsarsko Selo (loan)	Second League	2018–19	12	1	–		–		–		12	1
Vitosha Bistritsa (loan)	First League	2019–20	24	1	1	1	–		–		25	2
Slavia Sofia	First League	2020–21	7	0	1	0	–		–		8	0
Septemvri Sofia	Second League	2020–21	13	7	0	0	–		1	0	14	7
Septemvri Sofia	Second League	2021–22	33	9	3	0	–		–		36	9
Septemvri Sofia	Second League	2022–23	30	6	2	0	–		–		32	6
Septemvri Sofia	Total		76	22	5	0	0	0	1	0	82	22
Hebar Pazardzhik	First League	2023–24	32	3	3	1	–		–		35	4
Hebar Pazardzhik	First League	2024–25	15	3	1	0	–		–		16	3
Hebar Pazardzhik	Total		47	6	4	1	0	0	0	0	51	7
Sakaryaspor	TFF First League	2024–25	10	0	–		–		–		10	0
Sakaryaspor	TFF First League	2025–26	1	0	0	0	–		–		1	0
Sakaryaspor	Total		11	0	0	0	0	0	0	0	11	0
Arda Kardzhali	First League	2025–26	26	1	2	0	–		–		28	1
Career total			225	31	15	3	0	0	1	0	241	34
