= Martin Raynov =

Bulgarian footballer

Martin Raynov Мартин Райнов
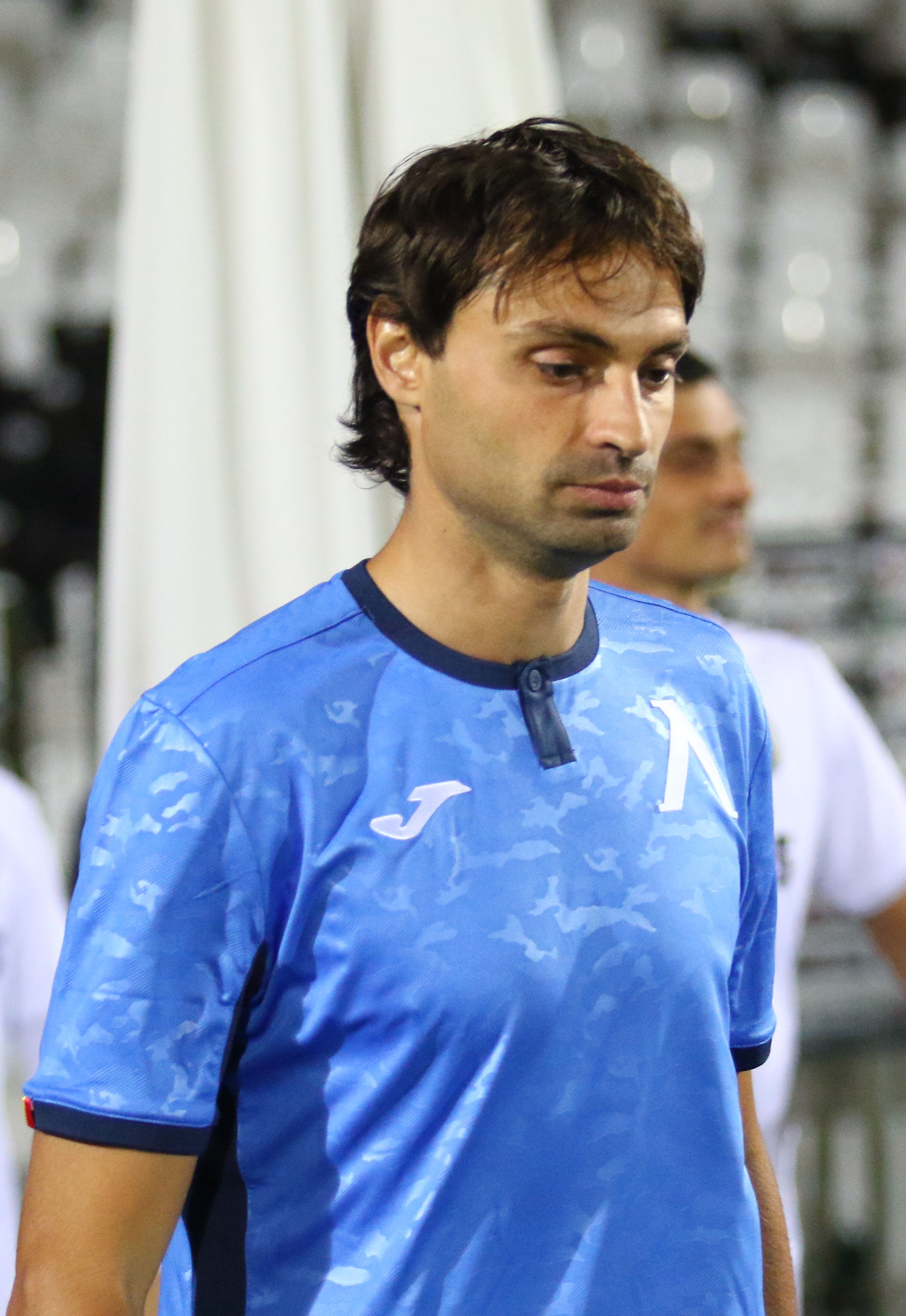

Personal information
- Full name: Martin Nikolaev Raynov
- Date of birth: 25 April 1992 (age 34)
- Place of birth: Gabrovo, Bulgaria
- Height: 1.83 m (6 ft 0 in)
- Position: Midfielder

Team information
- Current team: Yantra Gabrovo
- Number: 15

Youth career
- 2000–2005: Yantra Gabrovo
- 2005–2011: Beroe

Senior career*
Years	Team	Apps	(Gls)
2011–2014	Beroe	16	(0)
2011	→ Etar 1924 (loan)	8	(1)
2012	→ Sliven (loan)	9	(2)
2014	→ Bansko (loan)	13	(2)
2014–2015	Haskovo	26	(0)
2015	Lokomotiv GO	17	(5)
2016–2017	Lokomotiv Plovdiv	29	(2)
2017–2019	Beroe	61	(5)
2019–2021	Levski Sofia	52	(1)
2021	Ashdod	0	(0)
2021–2023	Argeș Pitești	39	(2)
2023	Lokomotiv Sofia	12	(0)
2024	Lokomotiv Plovdiv	12	(0)
2024	Hebar Pazardzhik	0	(0)
2024–	Yantra Gabrovo	61	(13)

International career^{‡}
2012–2013	Bulgaria U21	3	(0)
2016–	Bulgaria	8	(0)
- * Club domestic league appearances and goals as of 26 May 2026 ‡ National team caps and goals as of 28 March 2021

Martin Nikolaev Raynov (Bulgarian: Мартин Николаев Райнов; born 25 April 1992) is a Bulgarian professional footballer who plays as a midfielder for Yantra Gabrovo.

== Club career ==
In February 2019, he signed a 1.5-year contract with Levski Sofia.

On 1 July 2021, Raynov signed for the Israeli Premier League club F.C. Ashdod.

== International career ==
In August 2016, Raynov received his first call up to the senior Bulgaria squad for a 2018 FIFA World Cup qualifier against Luxembourg, and earned his first senior cap on 10 October, coming on as a substitute for Simeon Slavchev in a 3–0 loss in a World Cup qualifier against Sweden at Friends Arena in Solna.

== Career statistics ==
As of match played 28 March 2021

Appearances and goals by national team and year
National team	Year	Apps	Goals
Bulgaria	2016	1	0
Bulgaria	2017	2	0
Bulgaria	2018	4	0
Bulgaria	2019	0	0
Bulgaria	2020	0	0
Bulgaria	2021	1	0
Total		8	0

== Honours ==
Beroe

- Bulgarian Cup: 2012–13
- Bulgarian Supercup: 2013
