= Steve Furtado =

Cape Verdean footballer (born 1994)

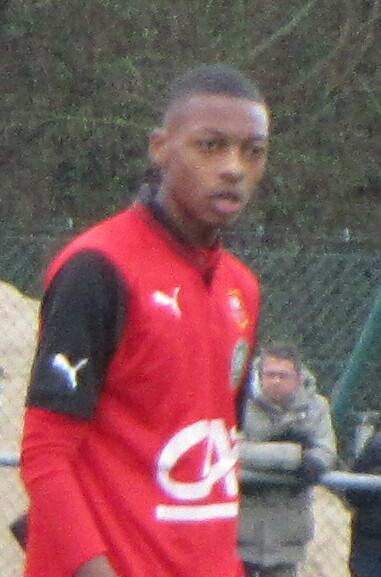
- Furtado with Rennes B in 2013

Personal information
- Full name: Steve José Furtado Pereira
- Date of birth: November 22, 1994 (age 31)
- Place of birth: Creil, France
- Height: 1.75 m (5 ft 9 in)
- Position: Right back

Team information
- Current team: Farul Constanța
- Number: 93

Youth career
- 2000–2008: AS Bondy
- 2007–2010: INF Clairefontaine
- 2010–2012: Rennes

Senior career*
Years	Team	Apps	(Gls)
2012–2014	Rennes B	24	(3)
2014–2016	Caen B	9	(0)
2016–2017	Creteil	23	(0)
2016–2017	Creteil B	4	(0)
2017–2019	Orléans	31	(0)
2017–2019	Orléans B	6	(0)
2019	Albacete	0	(0)
2020–2022	Beroe	60	(1)
2022–2025	CSKA 1948	71	(1)
2022–2023	CSKA 1948 II	3	(0)
2025–	Farul Constanța	19	(0)

International career^{‡}
2020–2023	Cape Verde	17	(0)
- * Club domestic league appearances and goals as of 18 May 2026 ‡ National team caps and goals as of 17 October 2023

Steve José Furtado Pereira (born 22 November 1994) is a professional footballer who plays as a right back for Liga I club Farul Constanța. Born in France, he plays the Cape Verde national football team.

== Club career ==
Furtado joined US Orléans on 25 June 2017 after a successful spell with US Créteil-Lusitanos. He made his professional debut for Orléans in a 3–1 Ligue 2 win over AS Nancy on 28 July 2017. In July 2022 Furtado signed a contract with CSKA 1948.

== International career ==
Born in France, Furtado is Cape Verdean by descent. On 1 October 2020, Furtado was called by Cape Verde. He debuted for Cape Verde in a friendly 2–1 win over Andorra on 7 October 2020.

== Career statistics ==
=== Club ===
As of match played 19 August 2026

Appearances and goals by club, season and competition
Club	Season	League			National cup (Note: Includes Coupe de France, Bulgarian Cup, Cupa României)		Europe		Other		Total	
Club	Season	Division	Apps	Goals	Apps	Goals	Apps	Goals	Apps	Goals	Apps	Goals
Rennes B	2012–13	CFA 2	5	1	–		–		–		5	1
Rennes B	2013–14	CFA 2	19	2	–		–		–		19	2
Rennes B	Total		24	3	–		–		–		24	3
Caen B	2014–15	CFA 2	9	0	–		–		–		9	0
Caen B	2015–16	CFA 2	0	0	–		–		–		19	2
Caen B	Total		9	0	–		–		–		9	0
Creteil	2016–17	Championnat National	23	0	2	0	–		0	0	25	0
Creteil B	2016–17	CFA 2	4	0	–		–		–		4	0
Orléans	2017–18	Ligue 2	21	0	0	0	–		1 (Note: Appearances in Coupe de la Ligue)	0	22	0
Orléans	2018–19	Ligue 2	10	0	2	0	–		3	0	15	0
Orléans	Total		31	0	2	0	–		4	0	37	0
Orléans B	2017–18	Championnat National 3	4	0	–		–		–		4	0
Orléans B	2018–19	Championnat National 3	2	0	–		–		–		2	0
Orléans B	Total		6	0	–		–		–		0	0
Albacete	2019–20	Segunda División	0	0	–		–		–		0	0
Beroe	2019–20	Bulgarian First League	9	0	–		–		–		9	0
Beroe	2020–21	Bulgarian First League	25	0	1	0	–		–		26	0
Beroe	2021–22	Bulgarian First League	26	1	2	1	–		1 (Note: Appearance in Bulgarian First League European play-offs)	0	29	2
Beroe	Total		60	1	3	1	–		1	0	64	2
CSKA 1948	2022–23	Bulgarian First League	26	0	4	0	–		–		30	0
CSKA 1948	2023–24	Bulgarian First League	22	0	2	0	0	0	0	0	24	0
CSKA 1948	2024–25	Bulgarian First League	23	1	2	1	4 (Note: Appearances in UEFA Conference League)	0	–		29	2
CSKA 1948	Total		71	1	8	1	4	0	0	0	83	2
CSKA 1948 II	2022–23	Bulgarian Second League	1	0	–		–		–		1	0
CSKA 1948 II	2023–24	Bulgarian Second League	2	0	–		–		–		2	0
CSKA 1948 II	Total		3	0	–		–		–		3	0
Farul Constanța	2025–26	Liga I	19	0	3	0	–		2 (Note: Appearances in Liga I promotion/relegation play-offs)	0	24	0
Farul Constanța	2026–27	Liga I	0	0	1	0	–		–		1	0
Farul Constanța	Total		19	0	4	0	–		2	0	25	0
Career Total			250	5	19	2	4	0	7	0	280	7

=== International ===
As of match played 17 October 2023

Appearances and goals by national team and year
National team	Year	Apps	Goals
Cape Verde	2020	3	0
Cape Verde	2021	5	0
Cape Verde	2022	5	0
Cape Verde	2023	4	0
Total		17	0

== Honours ==
CSKA 1948

- Bulgarian Cup runner-up: 2022–23
- Bulgarian Supercup runner-up: 2023

CSKA 1948 II

- Bulgarian Second League: 2022–23
