= Mateo Stamatov =

Bulgarian footballer (born 1999)

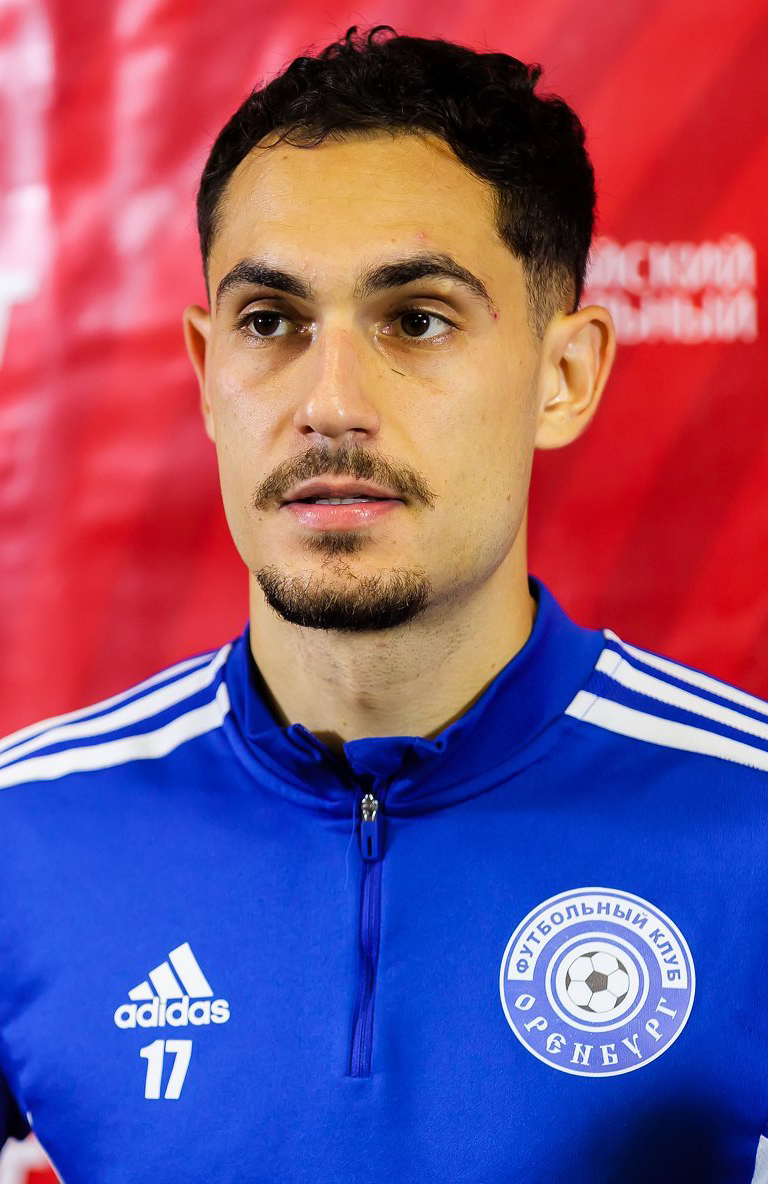
- Stamatov with Orenburg in 2022

Personal information
- Full name: Mateo Marianov Stamatov
- Date of birth: 22 March 1999 (age 27)
- Place of birth: Pazardzhik, Bulgaria
- Height: 1.78 m (5 ft 10 in)
- Positions: Left back; left winger

Team information
- Current team: Torpedo Kutaisi
- Number: 33

Youth career
- 2011–2018: Espanyol

Senior career*
Years	Team	Apps	(Gls)
2019	Septemvri Sofia	3	(0)
2019–2020	UA Horta	21	(1)
2020–2021	Levski Sofia	12	(0)
2021–2023	Orenburg	33	(0)
2023–2025	Pari Nizhny Novgorod	34	(0)
2025–2026	Septemvri Sofia	15	(0)
2026–	Torpedo Kutaisi	3	(0)

International career
2015	Bulgaria U17	3	(0)
2016–2018	Bulgaria U19	7	(1)
- * Club domestic league appearances and goals as of 1 September 2026

Mateo Marianov Stamatov (Bulgarian: Матео Марианов Стаматов; born 22 March 1999) is a Bulgarian professional footballer who plays for Erovnuli Liga club Torpedo Kutaisi. Although he predominantly plays as a left-back, he has also been deployed as a left winger.

== Club career ==
Born in Pazardzhik, Stamatov moved with his family to Barcelona, Spain when he was an infant. At the age of 7 he joined a local team before joining Espanyol in 2011. Four years later he signed a professional contract with the team.

On 3 February 2019, Stamatov returned to Bulgaria and signed a contract with Septemvri Sofia. He made his professional debut in a league match against Ludogorets Razgrad on 16 March 2019.

In August 2020, Stamatov joined Levski Sofia, signing a one-year contract.

In June 2021, Stamatov left Levski to join Russian side FC Orenburg. Stamatov left Orenburg on 6 June 2023.

On 26 June 2023, Stamatov signed with the Russian Premier League club FC Pari Nizhny Novgorod. Stamatov's contract with Pari Nizhny Novgorod was terminated by mutual consent on 20 March 2025. In October 2025, he joined Septemvri Sofia as a free agent.

== International career ==
Stamatov was called up to the senior Bulgaria national team for the first time in September 2022 for Nations League games against Gibraltar and North Macedonia.

== Career statistics ==
=== Club ===
As of match played on 24 November 2024

Appearances and goals by club, season and competition
Club	Season	League			Cup		Other		Total	
Club	Season	Division	Apps	Goals	Apps	Goals	Apps	Goals	Apps	Goals
Septemvri Sofia	2018–19	First League	3	0	1	0	—		4	0
UA Horta	2019–20	Tercera División	21	1	1	0	—		22	1
Levski Sofia	2020–21	First League	12	0	1	0	—		13	0
Orenburg	2021–22	Russian First League	18	0	1	0	—		19	0
Orenburg	2022–23	Russian Premier League	15	0	4	0	—		19	0
Orenburg	Total		33	0	5	0	0	0	38	0
Nizhny Novgorod	2023–24	Russian Premier League	22	0	4	0	2 (Note: Appearances in relegation playoffs)	0	28	0
Nizhny Novgorod	2024–25	Russian Premier League	12	0	2	0	—		14	0
Nizhny Novgorod	Total		34	0	6	0	2	0	42	0
Career total			125	1	18	0	2	0	145	1
