= Thomas Dasquet =

French footballer (born 1994)

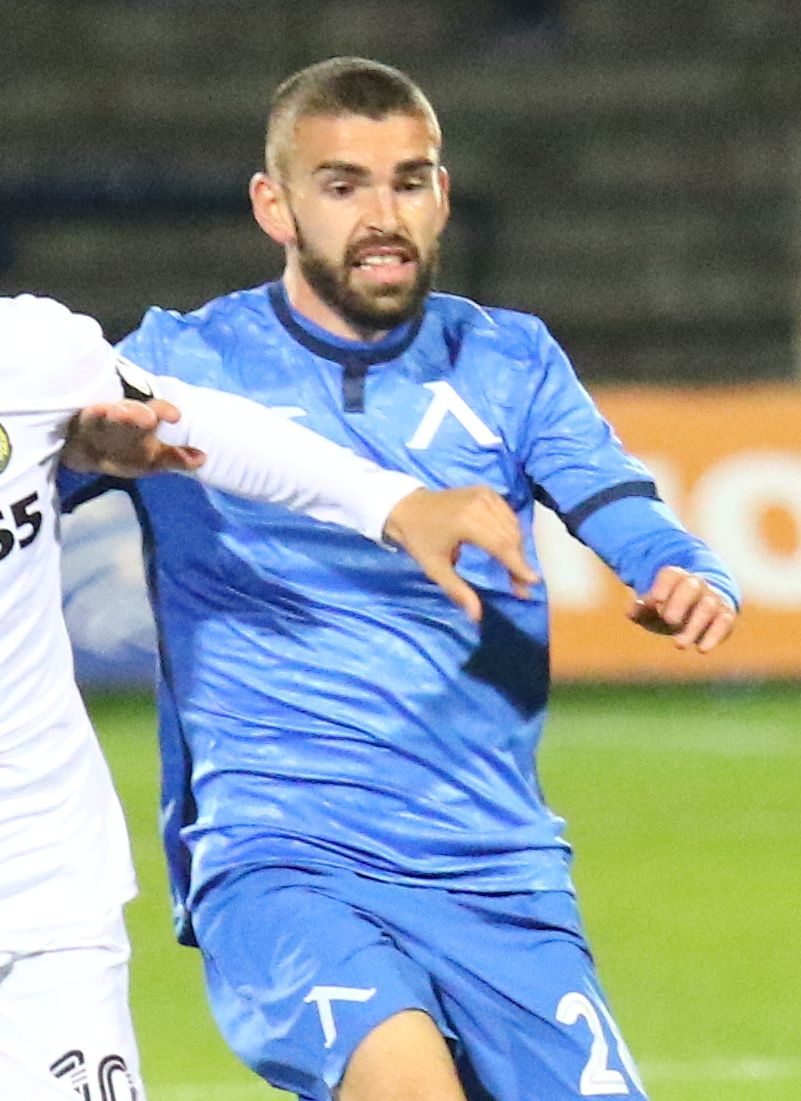
- Dasquet in 2020

Personal information
- Date of birth: 3 June 1994 (age 32)
- Place of birth: Argenteuil, France
- Height: 1.79 m (5 ft 10 1/2 in)
- Positions: Defensive midfielder; centre-back

Team information
- Current team: Angoulême Charente
- Number: 28

Youth career
- Racing 92
- 2010–2012: Troyes

Senior career*
Years	Team	Apps	(Gls)
2012–2016	Troyes II	69	(0)
2015–2016	Troyes	5	(0)
2016–2020	Le Mans	64	(1)
2020–2021	Levski Sofia	24	(0)
2021–2024	La Nucía	88	(2)
2024–2025	Chambly Oise	21	(0)
2025–	Angoulême Charente	6	(0)
- * Club domestic league appearances and goals as of 4 December 2025

Thomas Dasquet (born 3 June 1994) is a French footballer who plays mainly as a defensive midfielder for Championnat National 1 club Angoulême Charente.

Dasquet began his career in the youth system at Troyes, and played 5 matches in the 2014–15 Ligue 2 season before leaving in 2016 for Le Mans, which was then a Championnat de France Amateur 2 (fifth-tier) club.

== Life and career ==
Dasquet was born in Argenteuil, in the suburbs of Paris. As a youngster, he played football for Racing 92 before joining Troyes in 2010. He played regularly for Troyes' reserve team in the CFA2 (fifth tier of French football), helping them gain promotion to the Championnat de France Amateur in 2013–14. Towards the end of the 2014–15 Ligue 2 season, with Troyes' first team sure of promotion to Ligue 1, Dasquet was one of several reserves called up for their senior debuts. He was included in the starting eleven for the match against Nancy on 24 April. After 35 minutes, he brought down an opponent; Dasquet himself thought he might receive a yellow card, although he said the foul had been unintentional, and there was a covering defender, but the referee sent him off. He missed the next match through suspension, but played in the last four Ligue 2 matches of the season, all but one as a starter.

At the end of the season, Dasquet was not offered a professional contract, so he decided to look for another club. Trials with Belgian club OH Leuven and Fréjus of the Championnat National came to nothing, so he returned to Troyes and took up their offer of an amateur contract. He played out the 2015–16 season as captain of the CFA team before moving on, to Le Mans of the CFA2, with whom he hoped to make a fresh start. He was one of five players to enjoy three consecutive promotions and begin the 2019–20 season with Le Mans in Ligue 2.

On 6 August 2020, Dasquet moved abroad for the first time in his career, signing a 2-year contract with Bulgarian club Levski Sofia.
