= Martin Petkov (footballer, born 2002) =

Bulgarian footballer

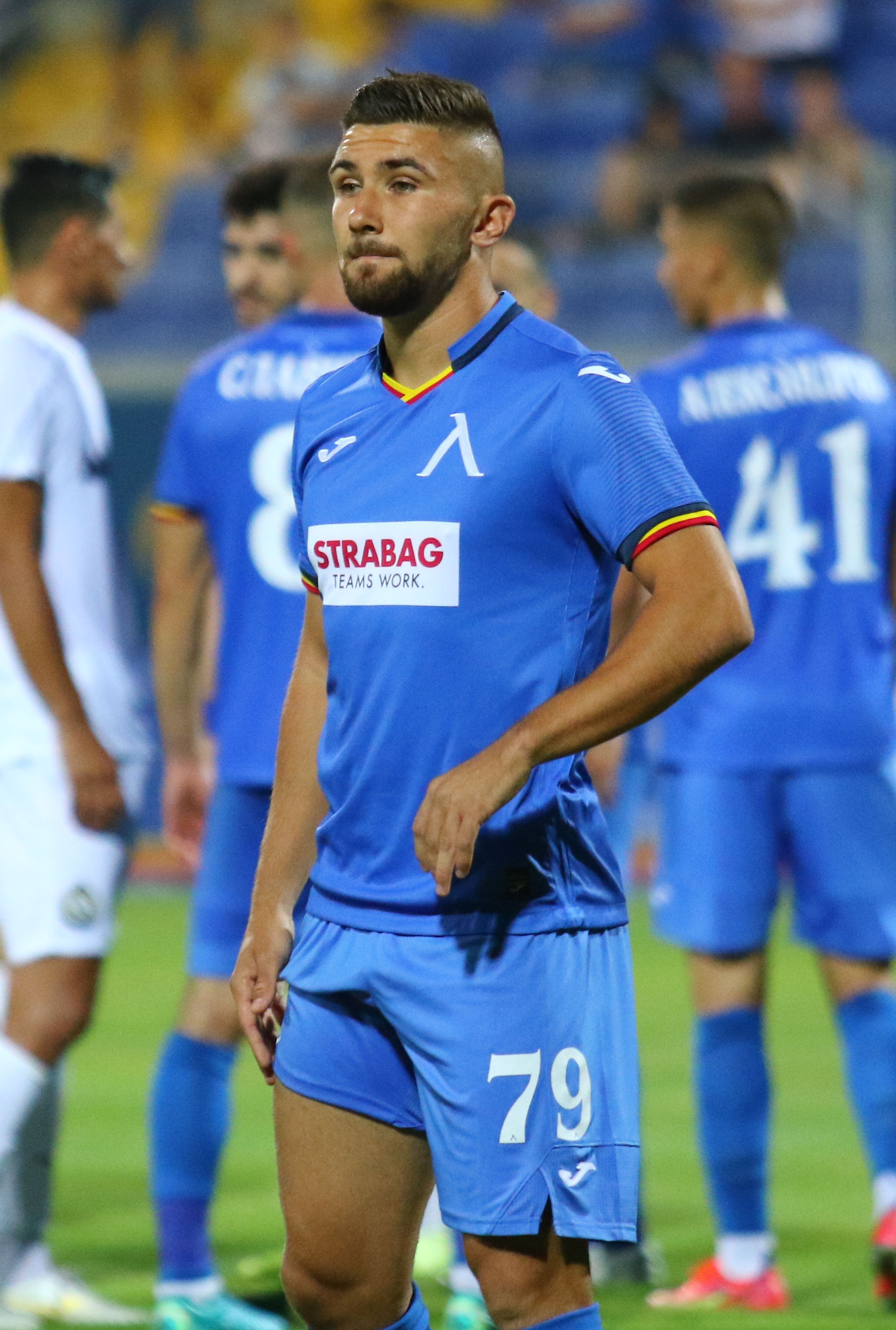

Personal information
- Full name: Martin Detelinov Petkov
- Date of birth: 15 August 2002 (age 24)
- Place of birth: Sofia, Bulgaria
- Height: 1.77 m (5 ft 9 1/2 in)
- Position: Winger

Team information
- Current team: Botev Vratsa
- Number: 79

Youth career
- Levski Sofia

Senior career*
Years	Team	Apps	(Gls)
2019–2021	Levski Sofia	58	(3)
2022	Chornomorets Odesa	0	(0)
2022	Slavia Sofia	10	(1)
2022–2023	Septemvri Sofia	26	(4)
2023–2024	Turan Tovuz	14	(3)
2024–2025	Lokomotiv Plovdiv	39	(0)
2025–	Botev Vratsa	31	(7)

International career^{‡}
2019	Bulgaria U19	2	(0)
2021–2023	Bulgaria U21	8	(1)
- * Club domestic league appearances and goals as of 11 June 2026 ‡ National team caps and goals as of 21:37, 25 March 2022 (UTC)

Martin Detelinov Petkov (Bulgarian: Мартин Детелинов Петков; born 15 August 2002) is a Bulgarian footballer who plays as a winger for Botev Vratsa.

== Career ==
Petkov made his competitive debut at the age of 16 years and 8 months, in a 0–2 home league loss against Ludogorets on 14 April 2019, coming on as a substitute for Stanislav Ivanov. On 25 September 2019, he scored his first brace for the club in the 5–1 away win against Spartak Varna in the first round of the Bulgarian Cup. After joining Ukrainian club Chornomorets Odesa in January 2022, in February 2022 he cancelled his contract with the club and signed a deal with Slavia Sofia.

== Career statistics ==
=== Club ===
As of 12 December 2021

Club performance			League		Cup		Continental		Other		Total	
Club	League	Season	Apps	Goals	Apps	Goals	Apps	Goals	Apps	Goals	Apps	Goals
Bulgaria			League		Bulgarian Cup		Europe		Other (Note: Includes Bulgarian Supercup matches.)		Total	
Levski Sofia	First League	2018–19	8	0	0	0	0	0	0	0	8	0
Levski Sofia	First League	2019–20	16	1	5	2	0	0	0	0	21	3
Levski Sofia	First League	2020–21	21	1	3	1	0	0	0	0	24	2
Levski Sofia	First League	2021–22	13	1	2	0	0	0	0	0	2	0
Levski Sofia	Total		58	3	10	3	0	0	0	0	68	6
Career statistics			58	3	10	3	0	0	0	0	68	6
