= Georgi Aleksandrov =

Bulgarian footballer

Personal information
- Full name: Georgi Krasimirov Aleksandrov
- Date of birth: 21 May 2001 (age 25)
- Place of birth: Sofia, Bulgaria
- Height: 1.84 m (6 ft 0 in)
- Position: Centre-back

Team information
- Current team: Etar Veliko Tarnovo
- Number: 4

Youth career
- 2011–2020: Levski Sofia

Senior career*
Years	Team	Apps	(Gls)
2020	Vitosha Bistritsa	7	(0)
2020–2022	Levski Sofia	18	(0)
2022–	Etar Veliko Tarnovo	141	(8)
- * Club domestic league appearances and goals as of 03:44, 31 October 2026 (UTC)

Georgi Aleksandrov (Bulgarian: Георги Александров; born 21 May 2001) is a Bulgarian professional footballer who plays as a centre-back for Etar Veliko Tarnovo.

== Career ==
Aleksandrov joined Levski Sofia's academy at the age of 10. He captained the U-19 team before signing for Vitosha Bistritsa in the First League. After the team got relegated to the second division and subsequently dissolved, on 2 October 2020, he returned to his boyhood club Levski Sofia on a two-year deal. On 21 October 2020, he made his debut in a 4–1 away win against Partizan Cherven Bryag in the Round of 32 of the Bulgarian Cup. In January 2022, Aleksandrov signed with Etar Veliko Tarnovo.
