= Simeon Slavchev =

Bulgarian footballer

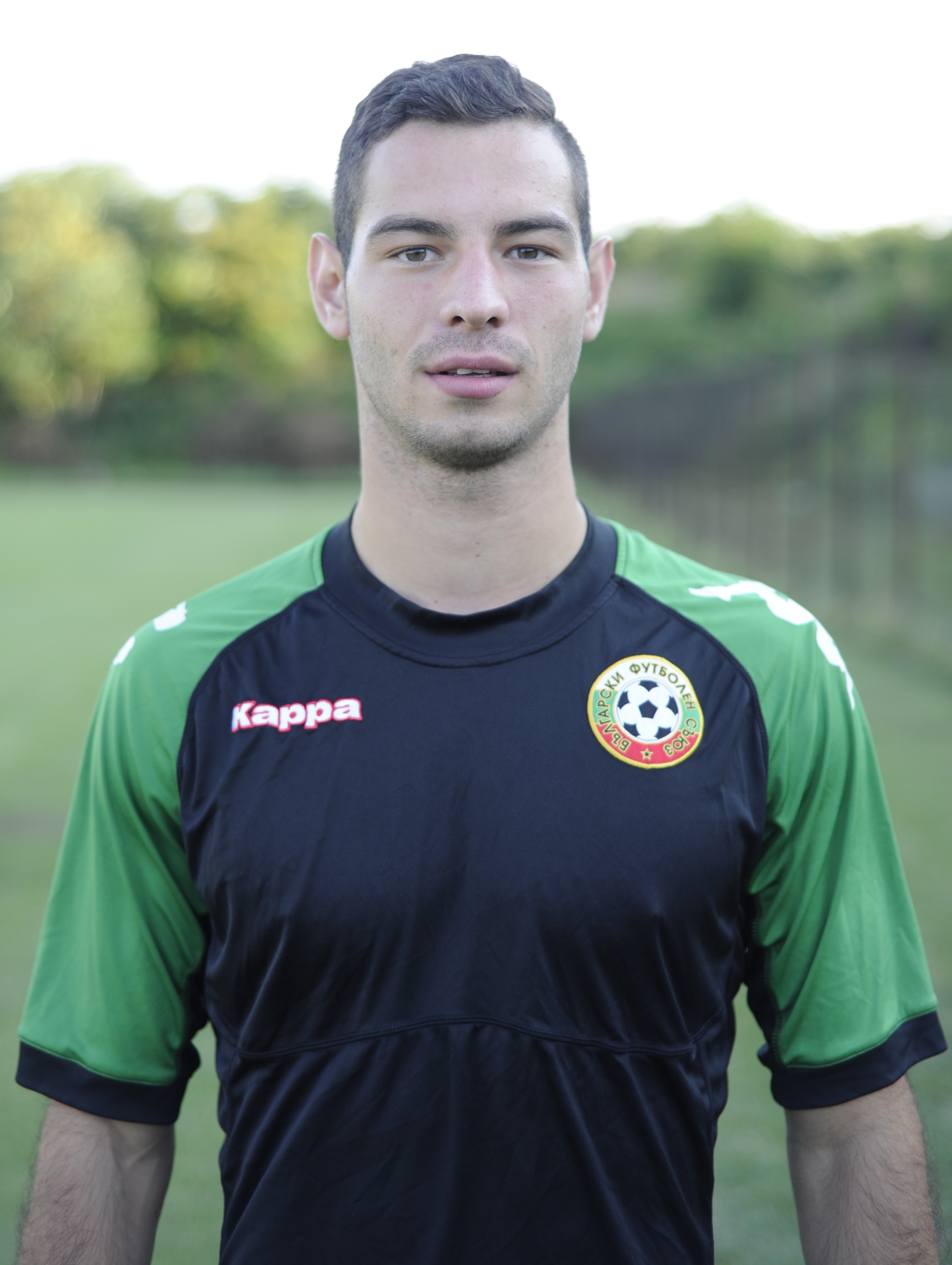

Personal information
- Full name: Simeon Nenchev Slavchev
- Date of birth: 25 September 1993 (age 33)
- Place of birth: Sofia, Bulgaria
- Height: 1.85 m (6 ft 1 in)
- Position: Defensive midfielder

Team information
- Current team: Minyor Pernik

Youth career
- –2007: Septemvri Sofia
- 2007–2008: Slavia Sofia
- 2008–2010: Litex Lovech

Senior career*
Years	Team	Apps	(Gls)
2010–2014	Litex Lovech	52	(15)
2011	→ Chavdar Etropole (loan)	13	(0)
2014–2018	Sporting CP	0	(0)
2014–2018	Sporting CP B	3	(0)
2015	→ Bolton Wanderers (loan)	1	(0)
2015–2016	→ Apollon Limassol (loan)	21	(1)
2016–2018	→ Lechia Gdańsk (loan)	50	(1)
2018–2019	Qarabağ	18	(2)
2020–2021	Levski Sofia	15	(1)
2021–2023	Lokomotiv Sofia	27	(1)
2023–2024	Wieczysta Kraków	12	(0)
2024–2026	Lokomotiv Sofia	13	(0)
2026–	Minyor Pernik	0	(0)

International career
2009	Bulgaria U17	3	(0)
2011	Bulgaria U19	3	(0)
2013	Bulgaria U21	4	(0)
2013–2019	Bulgaria	25	(0)
- * Club domestic league appearances and goals as of 11 June 2026

Simeon Nenchev Slavchev (Bulgarian: Симеон Ненчев Славчев; born 25 September 1993) is a Bulgarian professional footballer who plays as a defensive midfielder for Minyor Pernik.

Slavchev began his professional career at Litex Lovech in 2010. After loan spell at Chavdar Etropole he became a regular in their team. In 2014, he signed for Sporting CP, but failed to break into the first team. After a loan spells with Bolton Wanderers, Apollon Limassol, and Lechia Gdańsk, he signed for Qarabağ in 2018.

== Club career ==
=== Early career ===
Slavchev started his career at home-town club Septemvri Sofia, joining their youth system as a six-year-old. In the 2006–07 season, he became a goalscorer for their youth team. In 2007, Slavchev joined Slavia Sofia and was part of the side that won the Bulgarian U-15 Championship in the 2007–08 season.

=== Litex Lovech ===
Slavchev joined the Litex's first team in October 2010. He made his debut during the 2010–11 season, on 31 October 2010 in a 2–0 home win over Slavia Sofia, coming on as a substitute for Hristo Yanev.

In July 2011, Slavchev joined Chavdar Etropole on a season-long loan deal. In the 2011–12 season, he earned 13 appearances in the B PFG(second division of Bulgarian football).

In the summer of 2012, he returned to Litex. On 4 November 2012, in the league match against Cherno More, he marked his first goal in the A PFG in a 4–1 victory.

=== Sporting CP ===
On 19 May 2014, Slavchev signed with Portuguese side Sporting CP on a five-year deal, for a reported fee of €2.5 million.

==== Loans to Bolton, Apollon, and Lechia ====
On 2 February 2015, Slavchev joined Bolton Wanderers until the end of the season. He made his debut for the team in the English Championship on 7 February 2015 in a match against Derby County. It was his only match for Bolton after Slavchev got injured and was ruled out until the end of the season.

On 11 August 2015, Slavchev joined the Cypriot team Apollon Limassol on loan for the 2015–16 season. He made his debut on 23 August 2015, scoring the winning goal after added time. On 19 May 2016, Apollon won the Cypriot Cup.

Slavchev had an injury at the end of the 2015–16 season. Sporting decided to loan him out in order for him to gain more experience and to reach full fitness. On 17 August 2016, Slavchev joined Polish club Lechia Gdańsk, on a season-long loan, where he would play alongside fellow Bulgarian footballer, Milen Gamakov. Slavchev made his debut for the team on 9 September 2016, playing the full 90 minutes in a 1–0 win against Cracovia. He scored his first goal for the team on 11 March 2018, in a 3–1 home loss against Legia Warsaw.

Slavchev spent a trial period at Birmingham City during the summer of 2017.

=== Qarabağ ===
On 5 July 2018, Slavchev signed a three-year contract with Qarabağ FK.

=== Levski Sofia ===
After agreeing to rescind his contract with the Azerbaijani side, Slavchev returned to his home country. On 22 December 2019, he signed a three-year deal with Levski Sofia. He made his debut on 15 February 2020, in the 0–0 league draw against CSKA Sofia in The Eternal Derby, coming on as an early substitute before being replaced himself towards the end of the match due to injury issues. On 20 June 2020, Slavchev scored his first goal for the club in another Eternal derby that ended 3–3.

=== Lokomotiv Sofia ===
In December 2021, Slavchev signed a one-and-a-half-year contract with Lokomotiv Sofia.

=== Wieczysta Kraków ===
On 3 January 2023, despite efforts from Lechia Gdańsk to re-sign him in the winter transfer window, Slavchev joined Polish fourth division side Wieczysta Kraków on a two-and-a-half-year deal, with an extension option. After playing a marginal role in winning promotion to the third division, Slavchev left the club by mutual consent on 19 June 2024.

=== Return to Lokomotiv Sofia ===
On 3 July 2024, Slavchev re-joined Lokomotiv Sofia on a three-year deal.

== International career ==
In September 2009, he was called for Bulgaria U17 by coach Atanas Zhelev and took part in the UEFA U-17 European championship. In 2011, he was called up for the UEFA U-19 European Championship. In 2012, he got his first call-up for the national youth team by coach Mihail Madanski.

In 2013, he was called up for Bulgaria by Lyuboslav Penev for the 2014 World Cup qualification games against Malta and Denmark. On 15 October 2013, in the last match for the qualifications for the 2014 FIFA World Cup against the Czech Republic, he made his debut for the first team as a substitute.

On 25 March 2016, Slavchev came on as a substitute during the magnificent 0–1 away win over Portugal. On 13 November 2016, he played the full 90 minutes in the 1:0 win over Belarus in a 2018 World Cup qualifier.

== Career statistics ==
=== Club ===
As of 9 June 2024

Appearances and goals by club, season and competition
Club	Season	League			National cup		League cup		Europe		Total	
Club	Season	Division	Apps	Goals	Apps	Goals	Apps	Goals	Apps	Goals	Apps	Goals
Lovech	2010–11	A Group	1	0	0	0	—		0	0	1	0
Lovech	2012–13	A Group	17	1	4	0	—		0	0	21	1
Lovech	2013–14	A Group	34	14	1	0	—		0	0	35	14
Lovech	Total		52	15	5	0	0	0	0	0	57	15
Chavdar Etropole (loan)	2011–12	B Group	13	0	0	0	—		—		13	0
Sporting CP	2014–15	Primeira Liga	0	0	0	0	2	0	0	0	2	0
Sporting CP B	2014–15	Segunda Liga	3	0	0	0	—		—		3	0
Bolton Wanderers (loan)	2014–15	Championship	1	0	0	0	—		—		1	0
Apollon Limassol (loan)	2015–16	Cypriot First Division	21	1	5	1	—		0	0	26	2
Lechia Gdańsk (loan)	2016–17	Ekstraklasa	23	0	0	0	—		—		23	0
Lechia Gdańsk (loan)	2017–18	Ekstraklasa	27	1	0	0	—		—		27	1
Lechia Gdańsk (loan)	Total		50	1	0	0	0	0	0	0	50	1
Qarabağ	2018–19	Azerbaijan Premier League	16	2	2	0	—		13	0	31	2
Qarabağ	2019–20	Azerbaijan Premier League	2	0	0	0	—		6	0	8	0
Qarabağ	Total		18	2	2	0	0	0	19	0	39	2
Levski Sofia	2019–20	First League	3	1	1	0	—		—		4	1
Levski Sofia	2020–21	First League	7	0	1	0	—		—		8	0
Levski Sofia	2021–22	First League	5	0	0	0	—		—		5	0
Levski Sofia	Total		15	1	2	0	0	0	0	0	17	1
Lokomotiv Sofia	2021–22	First League	11	1	—		—		—		11	1
Lokomotiv Sofia	2022–23	First League	16	0	2	0	—		—		18	0
Lokomotiv Sofia	Total		27	1	2	0	0	0	0	0	29	1
Wieczysta Kraków	2022–23	III liga, gr. IV	4	0	—		—		—		4	0
Wieczysta Kraków	2023–24	III liga, gr. IV	8	0	1	0	—		—		9	0
Wieczysta Kraków	Total		12	0	1	0	0	0	0	0	13	0
Career total			212	21	17	1	2	0	19	0	250	22

=== International ===
As of 14 December 2018

Team	Year	Tournament		Friendly		Total	
Team	Year	Apps	Goals	Apps	Goals	Apps	Goals
Bulgaria U19	2011	3	0	0	0	3	0
Bulgaria U21	2013	4	0	0	0	4	0
Bulgaria
Bulgaria	2013	1	0	0	0	1	0
Bulgaria	2014	0	0	2	0	2	0
Bulgaria	2015	3	0	0	0	3	0
Bulgaria	2016	2	0	1	0	3	0
Bulgaria	2017	5	0	1	0	6	0
Bulgaria	2018	5	0	2	0	0	0
Bulgaria	2019	2	0	1	0	0	0
Bulgaria	Total	18	0	7	0	25	0
Career total		25	0	7	0	32	0

== Honours ==
Litex Lovech

- Bulgarian A PFG: 2010–11

Apollon Limassol

- Cypriot Cup: 2015–16

Qarabağ

- Azerbaijan Premier League: 2018–19

Wieczysta Kraków

- III liga, group IV: 2023–24
- Polish Cup (Lesser Poland regionals): 2022–23

Individual

- Bulgarian Best Young Player of the Season: 2013
- Lovech sportsman of the year: 2013
