= Ivaylo Naydenov =

Bulgarian footballer (born 1998)

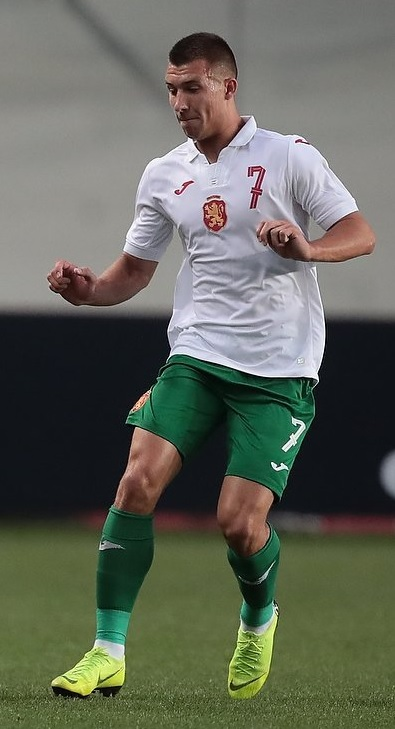
- Naydenov with Bulgaria U21 in 2020

Personal information
- Full name: Ivaylo Krasimirov Naydenov
- Date of birth: 22 March 1998 (age 28)
- Place of birth: Sofia, Bulgaria
- Height: 1.80 m (5 ft 11 in)
- Positions: Right back; defensive midfielder

Team information
- Current team: Slavia Sofia
- Number: 22

Youth career
- 2005–2017: Levski Sofia

Senior career*
Years	Team	Apps	(Gls)
2016–2021	Levski Sofia	75	(1)
2019	→ Arda (loan)	11	(0)
2022	Hebar	11	(0)
2022–2025	Lokomotiv Sofia	55	(3)
2025–	Slavia Sofia	9	(0)

International career^{‡}
2014–2015	Bulgaria U17		
2015–2017	Bulgaria U19	17	(0)
2019–2020	Bulgaria U21	9	(0)
- * Club domestic league appearances and goals as of 26 June 2025 ‡ National team caps and goals as of 10 October 2020

Ivaylo Naydenov (Bulgarian: Ивайло Найденов; born 22 March 1998) is a Bulgarian professional footballer who plays as a right back and defensive midfielder for Slavia Sofia.

Naydenov joined Levski Sofia's academy in 2005 and progressed through the youth ranks. He made his senior debut in 2016, at age 18.

== Career ==
On 13 August 2016, Naydenov made his first senior appearance for Levski, replacing Bozhidar Kraev in the last minutes as Levski won 1–0 at home against Ludogorets Razgrad in the A Group. In June 2022, Naydenov joined Lokomotiv Sofia.

== International career ==
Naydenov made his debut for the Bulgarian under-21 team on 22 March 2019 in the starting eleven for the friendly against Northern Ireland U21.

== Career statistics ==
=== Club ===
As of 14 February 2021

Club performance			League		Cup		Continental		Other		Total	
Club	League	Season	Apps	Goals	Apps	Goals	Apps	Goals	Apps	Goals	Apps	Goals
Bulgaria			League		Bulgarian Cup		Europe		Other (Note: Includes Bulgarian Supercup matches.)		Total	
Levski Sofia	First League	2016–17	10	0	0	0	–		–		10	0
Levski Sofia	First League	2017–18	10	0	1	0	1	0	–		12	0
Levski Sofia	First League	2018–19	7	0	2	0	0	0	–		9	0
Levski Sofia	First League	2019–20	12	0	2	0	1	0	–		15	0
Levski Sofia	First League	2020–21	27	1	2	0	–		–		29	1
Levski Sofia	First League	2021–22	2	0	0	0	–		–		2	0
Levski Sofia	Total		68	1	7	0	2	0	0	0	77	1
Arda (loan)	Second League	2018–19	11	0	0	0	–		1 (Note: Promotion Play-off)	0	12	0
Career statistics			79	1	7	0	2	0	1	0	89	1
