= 2019–20 PFC Levski Sofia season =

Levski Sofia
2019–20 season
- Chairman: Georgi Popov (until 2 June 2020); Nasko Sirakov (since 2 June 2020)
- Manager: Petar Hubchev (until 11 June 2020); Georgi Todorov (since 11 June 2020)
- Stadium: Vivacom Arena - Georgi Asparuhov
- First League: 4th
- Bulgarian Cup: Semi-finals
- UEFA Europa League: Second qualifying round
- Top goalscorer: League: Nigel Robertha (11); All: Nigel Robertha (11)
- Highest home attendance: 24,687 v. CSKA Sofia (15 February 2020)
- Lowest home attendance: 1,053 v. Vitosha Bistritsa (8 December 2019)
- Average home league attendance: 5,270
- Biggest win: 5–1 v. Spartak Varna (A)
- Biggest defeat: 0–4 v. AEK Larnaca (H)
Home colours	Away colours	Third colours

The 2019–20 season was Levski Sofia's 99th season in the First League. This article shows player statistics and all matches (official and friendly) that the club has played during the season.

== Transfers ==
=== In ===
No.	Pos.	Nat.	Name	Age	EU	Moving from	Type	Transfer window	Ends	Transfer fee	Source
1	GK	(Montenegro)	Milan Mijatović	31	Non-EU	(Montenegro) Budućnost Podgorica	Free transfer	Summer	2020	Free	levski.bg
6	MF	(Bulgaria)	Ivaylo Naydenov	21	EU	(Bulgaria) Arda	Loan return	Summer		Free	
8	MF	(Bulgaria)	Simeon Slavchev	26	EU	(Azerbaijan) Qarabağ	Free transfer	Winter	2022	Free	levski.bg
9	FW	(Austria)	Deni Alar	29	EU	(Austria) Rapid Wien	Loan	Summer	2020		levski.bg
10	MF	(Argentina)	Franco Mazurek	25	Non-EU	(Greece) Panetolikos	Free transfer	Summer	2021	Free	levski.bg
11	MF	(Bulgaria)	Zdravko Dimitrov	20	EU	(Bulgaria) Septemvri Sofia	Тransfer	Summer	2022	Undisclosed	levski.bg
14	MF	(Portugal)	Filipe Nascimento	24	EU	(Romania) Politehnica Iași	Loan return	Summer		Free	
17	FW	(Netherlands)	Nigel Robertha	21	EU	(Netherlands) Cambuur	Transfer	Summer	2022	Undisclosed	levski.bg
18	MF	(Ghana)	Nasiru Mohammed	25	EU	(Sweden) Häcken	Transfer	Summer	2022	250 000 €	levski.bg
19	DF	(Greece)	Giannis Kargas	24	EU	(Greece) PAS Giannina	Free transfer	Summer	2022	Free	levski.bg
21	MF	(Bulgaria)	Asen Chandarov	20	EU	(Bulgaria) Septemvri Sofia	Loan	Summer		Free	levski.bg
26	DF	(Bulgaria)	Deyan Lozev	26	EU	(Bulgaria) Arda	Transfer	Winter	2022	Undisclosed	levski.bg
27	GK	(Bulgaria)	Georgi Georgiev	31	EU	(Bulgaria) Slavia Sofia	Free transfer	Winter		Free	levski.bg
40	MF	(Netherlands)	Stijn Spierings	22	EU	(Netherlands) RKC Waalwijk	Transfer	Winter	2023	Undisclosed	levski.bg
45	FW	(Bulgaria)	Iliya Dimitrov	22	EU	(Bulgaria) Septemvri Sofia	Loan return	Summer		Free	
93	MF	(Bulgaria)	Atanas Kabov	20	EU	(Bulgaria) Tsarsko Selo	Loan return	Summer		Free	

Total spending: €400 000 ▼

=== Out ===
No.	Pos.	Nat.	Name	Age	EU	Moving to	Type	Transfer window	Transfer fee	Source
2	DF	(France)	Louis Nganioni	23	EU	(Denmark) Fremad Amager	Released	Summer	Free	gong.bg
8	MF	(Switzerland)	Davide Mariani	28	EU	(United Arab Emirates) Shabab Al-Ahli	Transfer	Summer	1 417 000 €	levski.bg
9	FW	(Romania)	Sergiu Buș	26	EU	(Romania) Gaz Metan Mediaș	Released	Summer	Free	gong.bg
10	FW	(Brazil)	Rivaldinho	24	EU	(Romania) Viitorul	Released	Summer	Free	topsport.bg
11	MF	(France)	Anthony Belmonte	23	EU	(France) Grenoble Foot 38	Released	Summer	Free	gong.bg
14	MF	(Estonia)	Bogdan Vaštšuk	23	EU	(Latvia) Riga	Loan return	Summer	Free	gong.bg
17	FW	(Kazakhstan)	Yerkebulan Seydakhmet	19	Non-EU	(Russia) Ufa	Loan return	Summer	Free	gong.bg
18	DF	(Benin)	Cédric Hountondji	25	EU	(France) Clermont Foot	End of contract	Summer	Free	gong.bg
19	DF	(Serbia)	Miloš Cvetković	29	EU	(Serbia) Mladost Lučani	End of contract	Summer	Free	levski.bg
21	MF	(Bulgaria)	Asen Chandarov	21	EU	(Bulgaria) Septemvri Sofia	Loan return	Winter	Free	sportal.bg
26	MF	(Cape Verde)	Jerson Cabral	28	EU	(Cyprus) Pafos	End of contract	Summer	Free	levski.bg
28	DF	(Czech Republic)	David Jablonský	27	EU	(Poland) Cracovia	End of contract	Summer	Free	levski.bg
75	MF	(Bulgaria)	Aleks Borimirov	21	EU		Retired	Summer	Free	gong.bg
86	FW	(Bulgaria)	Valeri Bojinov	33	EU	(Bulgaria) Botev Vratsa	Released	Summer	Free	sportal.bg
89	GK	(Bulgaria)	Nikolay Krastev	22	EU	(Bulgaria) Vitosha Bistritsa	Released	Summer	Free	gong.bg

Total income: €1 417 000 ▲

Net income: €1 017 000 ▲

=== Loans out ===
No.	Pos.	Nat.	Name	Age	EU	Moving to	Type	Transfer window	Transfer fee	Source
24	DF	(Bulgaria)	Tomislav Papazov	17	EU	(Bulgaria) Hebar	Loan	Summer	—	
39	DF	(Bulgaria)	Deyan Ivanov	23	EU	(Bulgaria) Botev Vratsa	Loan	Summer	—	
45	FW	(Bulgaria)	Iliya Dimitrov	23	EU	(Bulgaria) Vitosha Bistritsa	Loan	Summer	—	
71	MF	(Bulgaria)	Martin P. Petkov	18	EU	(Bulgaria) Lokomotiv GO	Loan	Summer	—	
93	MF	(Bulgaria)	Atanas Kabov	20	EU	(Bulgaria) Vitosha Bistritsa	Loan	Summer	—	
	MF	(Bulgaria)	Simeon Dimitrov	18	EU	(Bulgaria) Lokomotiv GO	Loan	Summer	—	

== Squad ==
Updated on 14 June 2020.

No.	Name	Nationality	Position(s)	Age	EU	Since	Ends	Signed from	Transfer fee	Notes
Goalkeepers
1	Milan Mijatović	Montenegro	GK	39	Non-EU	2019	2020	(Montenegro) Budućnost Podgorica	Free	
12	Petar Ivanov	Bulgaria	GK	26	EU	2018		Youth system	W/S	
13	Nikolay Mihaylov	Bulgaria	GK	38	EU	2018	2021	(Cyprus) Omonia	Free	Originally from Youth system
27	Georgi Georgiev	Bulgaria	GK	37	EU	2020	2022	(Bulgaria) Slavia Sofia	Free	Originally from Youth system
Defenders
4	Ivan Goranov	Bulgaria	LB	34	EU	2017	2021	(Bulgaria) Lokomotiv Plovdiv	Free	Originally from Youth system
5	Hólmar Örn Eyjólfsson	Iceland	CB/DM	36	EU	2017	2021	(Israel) Maccabi Haifa	€500 000	
6	Ivaylo Naydenov	Bulgaria	RB/DM/CM	28	EU	2016		Youth system	W/S	
19	Giannis Kargas	Greece	CB/DM	31	EU	2019	2022	(Greece) PAS Giannina	Free	
20	Zhivko Milanov	Bulgaria	RB/CB	42	EU	2019	2020	(Cyprus) APOEL	Free	Originally from Youth system
22	Nuno Reis	Portugal	CB/RB/DM	35	EU	2018	2021	(Portugal) Vitória Setúbal	Undisclosed	
26	Deyan Lozev	Bulgaria	RB/RW	32	EU	2019	2022	(Bulgaria) Arda	Undisclosed	
31	Kostadin Iliev	Bulgaria	CB/LB	24	EU	2020		Youth system	W/S	
Midfielders
8	Simeon Slavchev	Bulgaria	DM/CM	32	EU	2019	2022	(Azerbaijan) Qarabağ	Free	
10	Franco Mazurek	Argentina	AM	32	Non-EU	2019	2021	(Greece) Panetolikos	Free	
14	Filipe Nascimento	Portugal	AM/CM	31	EU	2017	2020	(Romania) Dinamo București	€200 000	
23	Khaly Thiam	Senegal	DM	32	Non-EU	2018	2021	(Hungary) MTK Budapest	€300 000	
40	Stijn Spierings	Netherlands	AM	30	EU	2020	2023	(Netherlands) RKC Waalwijk	Undisclosed	
70	Martin Raynov	Bulgaria	DM/CM	34	EU	2019	2020	(Bulgaria) Beroe	Undisclosed	
77	Iliya Yurukov	Bulgaria	DM/CM	26	EU	2016		Youth system	W/S	
Forwards
7	Paulinho	Brazil	LW	33	EU	2018	2021	(Ukraine) Zorya Luhansk	Free	Second nationality: Bulgaria
9	Deni Alar	Austria	CF	36	EU	2019	2020	(Austria) Rapid Wien	Loan	
11	Zdravko Dimitrov	Bulgaria	LW	27	EU	2019	2022	(Bulgaria) Septemvri Sofia	Free	
17	Nigel Robertha	Netherlands	CF	28	EU	2019	2022	(Netherlands) Cambuur	Undisclosed	
18	Nasiru Mohammed	Ghana	RW/LW/CF/AM	32	EU	2019	2022	(Sweden) Häcken	€250 000	Second nationality: Sweden
29	Stanislav Kostov	Bulgaria	CF	34	EU	2018	2022	(Bulgaria) Pirin Blagoevgrad	Free	
79	Martin D. Petkov	Bulgaria	LW/CF	23	EU	2019		Youth system	W/S	
99	Stanislav Ivanov	Bulgaria	CF/AM/RW	27	EU	2016		Youth system	W/S	

== Performance overview ==
Competition	First match	Last match	Starting round	Final position	Record							
Competition	First match	Last match	Starting round	Final position	Pld	W	D	L	GF	GA	GD	Win %
First League	15 July 2019	12 July 2020	Matchday 1	4th	31	15	8	8	50	30	+20	48.39
Bulgarian Cup	25 September 2019	23 June 2020	Round of 32	Semi-finals	5	2	2	1	6	3	+3	40.00
UEFA Europa League	11 July 2019	1 August 2019	First qualifying round	Second qualifying round	4	2	0	2	4	7	−3	50.00
Total					40	19	10	11	60	40	+20	47.50

Source: Fixtures

== Fixtures ==
Win Draw Loss Upcoming fixture

=== Friendlies ===
==== Summer ====
23 June 2019	Levski Sofia (Bulgaria)	0–1	(Brazil) Red Bull Bragantino	Angerberg, Austria
17:00 CEST		Report	Tubarão 28'	Stadium: Sportplatz Angerberg

25 June 2019	Levski Sofia (Bulgaria)	0–1	(Russia) Zenit	Kufstein, Austria
18:00 CEST		Report	Azmoun 48' (pen.)	Stadium: Kufstein Arena

1 July 2019	Levski Sofia (Bulgaria)	0–4	(Germany) Türkgücü München	Jenbach, Austria
17:00 CEST		Report	Rabihic 27' (pen.); Lappe 56', 73'; Zorba 60'	Stadium: Sportplatz Jenbach

2 July 2019	Levski Sofia (Bulgaria)	1–1	(Switzerland) Young Boys	Fügen, Austria
18:30 CEST	S. Ivanov 16'	Report	Ngamaleu 77'	Stadium: Sportplatz Fügen

==== Mid-season ====
8 September 2019	Levski Sofia (Bulgaria)	4–0	(United Arab Emirates) Emirates Club	Bansko
17:30 EEST	M. D. Petkov 10'; Alar 20' (pen.), 90'; Nasiru 29'	Report		Stadium: Complex Evima Sport

12 October 2019	Pirin Razlog	1–2	Levski Sofia	Razlog
15:30 EEST	Stojanov 59'	Report	Mazurek 8', 9'	Stadium: Septemvri

29 May 2020	Levski Sofia	3–1	Vitosha Bistritsa	Sofia
17:00 EEST	Robertha 38'; M. D. Petkov 53'; Thiam 77'	Report	Il. Dimitrov 68'	Stadium: Vivacom Arena - Georgi Asparuhov

==== Winter ====
29 January 2020	Levski Sofia (Bulgaria)	3–2	(Armenia) Pyunik	Alanya, Turkey
16:30 EET	Spierings 10'; Z. Dimitrov 78'; Nascimento 87'	Report	Iwu 13'; Shevchuk 74'	Stadium: Gold City Sports Complex

1 February 2020	Levski Sofia (Bulgaria)	2–1	(Austria) Rapid Wien	Belek, Turkey
14:00 EET	Nascimento 78' (pen.); Raynov 90+3'	Report	Fountas 32'	Stadium: Maxx Royal Sports Complex

4 February 2020	Levski Sofia (Bulgaria)	4–1	Uzbekistan U-19	Alanya, Turkey
14:00 EET	M. D. Petkov 4'; Z. Dimitrov 35'; Nasiru 40'; M. Petkov 42'	Report	Hashimov 54'	Stadium: Gold City Sports Complex

6 February 2020	Levski Sofia (Bulgaria)	1–2	(Ukraine) Oleksandriya	Belek, Turkey
14:00 EET	Kostov 75' (pen.)	Report	Sitalo 33'; Zaderaka 60'	Stadium: Susesi Sports Complex

=== Parva Liga ===
==== Preliminary stage ====
===== League table =====
Pos	Team	Pld	W	D	L	GF	GA	GD	Pts	Qualification
2	Lokomotiv Plovdiv	26	14	8	4	49	23	+26	50 (Note: Head-to-head points (GD): Lokomotiv Plovdiv 4, CSKA Sofia 1.)	Qualification for the Championship round
3	CSKA Sofia	26	14	8	4	41	17	+24	50	Qualification for the Championship round
4	Levski Sofia	26	14	7	5	43	19	+24	49	Qualification for the Championship round
5	Slavia Sofia	26	13	6	7	36	28	+8	45	Qualification for the Championship round
6	Beroe	26	14	1	11	44	34	+10	43	Qualification for the Championship round

Source: Soccerway
Rules for classification: 1) Points; 2) Head-to-head points; 3) Head-to-head goal difference; 4) Head-to-head goals scored; 5) Head-to-head away goals scored (only if two teams); 6) Goal difference; 7) Goals scored; 8) Fairplay ranking; 9) Draw.

===== Results summary =====
Overall								Home						Away					
Pld	W	D	L	GF	GA	GD	Pts	W	D	L	GF	GA	GD	W	D	L	GF	GA	GD
26	14	7	5	43	19	+24	49	9	1	3	23	9	+14	5	6	2	20	10	+10

Last updated: 14 June 2020.
Source: bulgarian-football.com

===== Results by round =====
Round	1	2	3	4	5	6	7	8	9	10	11	12	13	14	15	16	17	18	19	20	21	22	23	24	25	26
Ground	A	A	H	A	H	A	H	A	H	A	H	A	H	H	H	A	H	A	H	A	H	A	H	A	H	A
Result	W	D	W	W	L	W	W	D	W	W	W	L	W	W	W	L	W	D	W	D	D	D	L	D	L	W
Position	1	3	2	1	3	2	1	2	2	2	2	2	2	2	2	3	2	2	2	2	2	2	2	2	4	4

Source: See Results
A = Away; H = Home; W = Win; D = Draw; L = Loss

===== Matches =====
15 July 2019 1	Dunav Ruse	1–4	Levski Sofia	Ruse
20:30 EEST	Ahmedov 47', (yellow card) 90+3'; Munin (yellow card) 52'; Isaevski (yellow card) 58'	Report	Mariani 15', 64' (pen.); S. Ivanov 38'; Paulinho 81'	Stadium: Gradski; Attendance: 3,400; Referee: Georgi Kabakov; Man of the Match: Davide Mariani

21 July 2019 2	Etar	0–0	Levski Sofia	Veliko Tarnovo
21:00 EEST		Report	Reis (yellow card) 6'; Mazurek (yellow card) 84'	Stadium: Ivaylo; Attendance: 8,000; Referee: Stanislav Todorov; Man of the Match: Hristo Ivanov

29 July 2019 3	Levski Sofia	3–1	Botev Plovdiv	Sofia
18:45 EEST	Mariani 10', 51'; Reis (yellow card) 64'; Goranov 80'	Report	Ebert 45'; K. Dimitrov (yellow card) 55'; Vutov (yellow card) 69'	Stadium: Vivacom Arena - Georgi Asparuhov; Attendance: 4,741; Referee: Nikola Popov; Man of the Match: Davide Mariani

5 August 2019 4	Tsarsko Selo	0–2	Levski Sofia	Sofia
21:00 EEST	Everton (yellow card) 27'; Minchev (yellow card) 40'; Markov (yellow card) 66'; Wesley (yellow card) 89'	Report	Kargas (yellow card) 19'; Yurukov (yellow card) 52'; Mazurek (yellow card) 63'; Robertha 89'; S. Ivanov 90+1'	Stadium: Vasil Levski National Stadium; Attendance: 550; Referee: Stanimir Trenchev; Man of the Match: Stanislav Ivanov

10 August 2019 5	Levski Sofia	1–3	Beroe	Sofia
20:30 EEST	Robertha (yellow card) 43'; Nascimento (yellow card) 45+8'; Mazurek 75'	Report	Eugénio 39'; Vasilev (yellow card) 45+12'; Tsvetkov (yellow card) 50'; Kamburov 54', 67', (yellow card) 68'; Zhelev (yellow card) 70'; Genev (yellow card) 85'	Stadium: Vivacom Arena - Georgi Asparuhov; Attendance: 4,750; Referee: Nikolay Yordanov; Man of the Match: Martin Kamburov

17 August 2019 6	Vitosha Bistritsa	0–4	Levski Sofia	Sofia
20:30 EEST	Gargorov (yellow card) 26'; Gochev (yellow card) 54'	Report	Paulinho 22', 51'; S. Ivanov (yellow card) 54'; Nascimento 82'; Robertha 89'	Stadium: Vasil Levski National Stadium; Attendance: 760; Referee: Radoslav Gidzhenov; Man of the Match: Paulinho

24 August 2019 7	Levski Sofia	1–0	Lokomotiv Plovdiv	Sofia
20:30 EEST	Robertha 59'; Raynov (yellow card) 90+3'	Report	Aralica (yellow card) 4'; Umarbayev (yellow card) 27'; Tsvetanov (yellow card) 69'; Ožbolt (yellow card) 90+3'; Karagaren (yellow card) 90+4'	Stadium: Vivacom Arena - Georgi Asparuhov; Attendance: 4,014; Referee: Ivaylo Stoyanov; Man of the Match: Nigel Robertha

1 September 2019 8	CSKA Sofia	2–2	Levski Sofia	Sofia
17:45 EEST	Evandro 73', (yellow card) 85'; Carey (yellow card) 76'; Albentosa (yellow card) 78', (goal) 88'; Bikel (yellow card) 81'	Report	S. Ivanov 12'; Robertha 18'; Thiam (yellow card) 68'; Milanov (yellow card) 90+4'	Stadium: Vasil Levski National Stadium; Attendance: 14,000; Referee: Georgi Kabakov; Man of the Match: Graham Carey

15 September 2019 9	Levski Sofia	3–0	Cherno More	Sofia
20:15 EEST	S. Ivanov 21'; Paulinho 31'; Thiam (yellow card) 33'; Robertha 35'	Report	Andrade (yellow card) 25'; Jorginho (yellow card) 64'	Stadium: Vivacom Arena - Georgi Asparuhov; Attendance: 4,307; Referee: Radoslav Gidzhenov; Man of the Match: Paulinho

21 September 2019 10	Slavia Sofia	0–2	Levski Sofia	Sofia
20:00 EEST	Gamakov (yellow card) 51'; Shokolarov (yellow card) 54'; G. Petkov (yellow card) 63'	Report	Eyjólfsson (yellow card) 25'; Kargas (yellow card) 63'; Nascimento 73'; S. Ivanov 81'	Stadium: Slavia; Attendance: 1,500; Referee: Dragomir Draganov; Man of the Match: Stanislav Ivanov

28 September 2019 11	Levski Sofia	3–1	Botev Vratsa	Sofia
20:00 EEST	Eyjólfsson 12'; Robertha 27'; Paulinho 87', (yellow card) 90+2'	Report	Lyaskov (yellow card) 20'; I. Milanov (yellow card) 24'; I. Mihaylov (yellow card) 42'; Genov 61'; A. Vasev (yellow card) 82'; Domovchiyski (yellow card) 84'; Valchev (yellow card) 90+2'	Stadium: Vivacom Arena - Georgi Asparuhov; Attendance: 3,040; Referee: Volen Chinkov; Man of the Match: Hólmar Örn Eyjólfsson

6 October 2019 12	Ludogorets Razgrad	2–0	Levski Sofia	Razgrad
20:15 EEST	Tchibota 16'; Ikoko (yellow card) 54'; Góralski (yellow card) 65'; Badji (yellow card) 71'; P. Iliev (yellow card) 74'; Keșerü 80'; Anicet (yellow card) 85'; Biton (yellow card) 90+2'	Report	Thiam (yellow card) 28'; Milanov (yellow card) 46'; Raynov (yellow card) 55'; Reis (yellow card) 83'	Stadium: Huvepharma Arena; Attendance: 6,500; Referee: Georgi Kabakov; Man of the Match: Mavis Tchibota

19 October 2019 13	Levski Sofia	2–1	Arda	Sofia
20:00 EEST	Thiam 70'; Raynov (yellow card) 78'; S. Ivanov 80'; Goranov (yellow card) 90+2'	Report	Sidoel (yellow card) 58'; Krumov 90+3'	Stadium: Vivacom Arena - Georgi Asparuhov; Attendance: 3,000; Referee: Georgi Nikolov; Man of the Match: Stanislav Ivanov

31 October 2019 14	Levski Sofia	2–0	Dunav Ruse	Sofia
18:30 EET	Makendzhiev 15' (o.g.); Eyjólfsson 23'; Goranov (yellow card) 81'	Report		Stadium: Vivacom Arena - Georgi Asparuhov; Attendance: 1,246; Referee: Nikola Popov; Man of the Match: Hólmar Örn Eyjólfsson

6 November 2019 15	Levski Sofia	3–0	Etar	Sofia
15:30 EET	Eyjólfsson 23'; Paulinho 49'; Alar 67'	Report		Stadium: Vivacom Arena - Georgi Asparuhov; Attendance: 1,637; Referee: Petar Kostadinov; Man of the Match: Deni Alar

10 November 2019 16	Botev Plovdiv	1–0	Levski Sofia	Plovdiv
15:15 EET	Tonev 47'; Shopov (yellow card) 66'	Report	Alar (yellow card) 27'; Thiam (yellow card) 66'; Eyjólfsson (yellow card) 76'; Reis (yellow card) 80'	Stadium: Botev 1912 Football Complex; Attendance: 2,900; Referee: Stanislav Todorov; Man of the Match: Aleksandar Tonev

24 November 2019 17	Levski Sofia	2–0	Tsarsko Selo	Sofia
17:45 EET	Robertha 27'; S. Ivanov 39'	Report	Carbonieri (yellow card) 85'; Daskalov (yellow card) 90'	Stadium: Vivacom Arena - Georgi Asparuhov; Attendance: 1,813; Referee: Georgi Davidov; Man of the Match: Stanislav Ivanov

30 November 2019 18	Beroe	1–1	Levski Sofia	Stara Zagora
17:30 EET	Kamburov 44'; Bandalovski (yellow card) 76'; Eugénio (yellow card) 88'	Report	Eyjólfsson (yellow card) 26'; Goranov (yellow card) 36'; Robertha 53'	Stadium: Beroe; Attendance: 3,000; Referee: Petar Kostadinov; Man of the Match: Martin Kamburov

8 December 2019 19	Levski Sofia	2–0	Vitosha Bistritsa	Sofia
16:30 EET	Paulinho 24'; S. Ivanov 60'	Report	Hristev (yellow card) 75'; Kupenov (yellow card) 82'; Gyonov (yellow card) 87'	Stadium: Vivacom Arena - Georgi Asparuhov; Attendance: 1,053; Referee: Nikola Popov; Man of the Match: Stanislav Ivanov

15 December 2019 20	Lokomotiv Plovdiv	0–0	Levski Sofia	Plovdiv
14:15 EET	Ožbolt (red card) 64'; Almeida (yellow card) 65'; D. Iliev (yellow card) 90+1'	Report	Goranov (yellow card) 54'; Eyjólfsson (yellow card) 64'; Raynov (yellow card) 66'; Thiam (yellow card) 86'; Nascimento (yellow card) 90+2'	Stadium: Lokomotiv; Attendance: 6,300; Referee: Stanislav Todorov; Man of the Match: Georgi Iliev

15 February 2020 21	Levski Sofia	0–0	CSKA Sofia	Sofia
14:45 EET	Paulinho (yellow card) 31'; Reis (yellow card) 39' (yellow-red card) 76'; Milanov (yellow card) 51'	Report	Malinov (yellow card) 19'; Antov (yellow card) 24'; Bikel (yellow card) 89'; Juric (yellow card) 90+2'; Zanev (red card) after FT'	Stadium: Vasil Levski National Stadium; Attendance: 24,000; Referee: Georgi Kabakov; Man of the Match: Valentin Antov

22 February 2020 22	Cherno More	2–2	Levski Sofia	Varna
14:15 EET	Coureur 14', (yellow card) 59'; Andrade (yellow card) 16'; Chantakias (yellow card) 31'; Panayotov (yellow card) 34'; Isa (yellow card) 38' (yellow-red card) 39'; Popov (yellow card) 61'; Minchev 90+4'	Report	Kargas (yellow card) 15'; Spierings 19'; Paulinho (yellow card) 43'; Thiam (yellow card) 60'; Goranov (yellow card) 62' (yellow-red card) 75'; Eyjólfsson (yellow card) 87'; Alar 90+3'	Stadium: Ticha; Attendance: 5,000; Referee: Ivaylo Stoyanov; Man of the Match: Martin Minchev

1 March 2020 23	Levski Sofia	1–2	Slavia Sofia	Sofia
14:15 EET	Robertha 27', (yellow card) 88'; Raynov (yellow card) 49'; Lozev (yellow card) 70'; Alar (red card) 89'; Thiam (yellow card) 90+4'	Report	Iv. Dimitrov 7', 55'; Patev (yellow card) 16'; G. Ivanov (yellow card) 38'; Valchev (yellow card) 69'; Hristov (yellow card) 84'; Karabelyov (yellow card) 90'	Stadium: Vivacom Arena - Georgi Asparuhov; Attendance: 8,200; Referee: Volen Chinkov; Man of the Match: Ivaylo Dimitrov

8 March 2020 24	Botev Vratsa	0–0	Levski Sofia	Vratsa
15:00 EET	Ganev (yellow card) 57'; I. Mihaylov (yellow card) 90+3'	Report	Raynov (yellow card) 45+3'; Milanov (yellow card) 82'; Reis (yellow card) 90+4'	Stadium: Hristo Botev; Attendance: 1,800; Referee: Georgi Davidov; Man of the Match: Daniel Genov

5 June 2020 25	Levski Sofia	0–1	Ludogorets Razgrad	Sofia
21:00 EEST	Slavchev (yellow card) 53'; Paulinho (yellow card) 59'	Report	Grigore (yellow card) 35'; Cauly 46'; Nedyalkov (yellow card) 66'; Stoyanov (yellow card) 70'; Wanderson (yellow card) 78'; Świerczok (yellow card) 82'; Ikoko (yellow card) 90'	Stadium: Vivacom Arena - Georgi Asparuhov; Attendance: 4,500; Referee: Nikolay Yordanov; Man of the Match: Cauly

14 June 2020 26	Arda	1–3	Levski Sofia	Plovdiv
16:30 EEST	Vasilev (yellow card) 35', (goal) 41'; Kovachev (yellow card) 50'; Georgiev (yellow card) 68'; Lucas (yellow card) 83'	Report	Paulinho 38'; Spierings 64'; K. Iliev (yellow card) 79'; M. D. Petkov 90+3'	Stadium: Lokomotiv; Attendance: 1,000; Referee: Petar Kostadinov; Man of the Match: Paulinho

==== Championship stage ====
===== League table =====
Pos	Team	Pld	W	D	L	GF	GA	GD	Pts	Qualification
1	Ludogorets Razgrad (C)	31	21	9	1	59	18	+41	72	Qualification for the Champions League first qualifying round
2	CSKA Sofia	31	16	11	4	52	22	+30	59	Qualification for the Europa League first qualifying round
3	Slavia Sofia (O)	31	16	7	8	42	32	+10	55	Qualification for the European play-off final
4	Levski Sofia	31	15	8	8	50	30	+20	53 (Note: Head-to-head points in the regular season: Levski 4, Lokomotiv Plovdiv 1.)	
5	Lokomotiv Plovdiv	31	15	8	8	53	35	+18	53	Qualification for the Europa League first qualifying round (Note: Lokomotiv Plovdiv qualified for the Europa League first qualifying round by winning the 2019–20 Bulgarian Cup.)
6	Beroe	31	16	1	14	50	43	+7	49	

Source: Soccerway
Rules for classification: 1) Points; 2) Head-to-head points; 3) Head-to-head goal difference; 4) Head-to-head goals scored; 5) Head-to-head away goals scored (only if two teams); 6) Goal difference; 7) Goals scored; 8) Fairplay ranking; 9) Draw.
(C) Champions; (O) Play-off winners

===== Results summary =====
Overall								Home						Away					
Pld	W	D	L	GF	GA	GD	Pts	W	D	L	GF	GA	GD	W	D	L	GF	GA	GD
5	1	1	3	7	11	−4	4	0	0	2	2	4	−2	1	1	1	5	7	−2

Last updated: 12 July 2020.
Source: See Results

===== Results by round =====
Round	1	2	3	4	5
Ground	A	A	H	A	H
Result	D	W	L	L	L
Position	4	2	2	3	4

Source: See results
A = Away; H = Home; W = Win; D = Draw; L = Loss

===== Matches =====
20 June 2020 27	CSKA Sofia	3–3	Levski Sofia	Sofia
16:15 EEST	Kargas 16' (o.g.); Busatto (yellow card) 34'; Antov (yellow card) 38'; Carey 58' (pen.); Galabov (yellow card) 69'; Pinto (yellow card) 74'; Sowe 88'	Report	Alar (yellow card) 16'; Nascimento (yellow card) 16'; Kargas (yellow card) 19'; Goranov 35' (pen.); Thiam 45+3'; Eyjólfsson (yellow card) 57'; Slavchev 62', (yellow card) 70'; Naydenov (yellow card) 86'	Stadium: Vasil Levski National Stadium; Attendance: 14,000; Referee: Georgi Kabakov; Man of the Match: Ali Sowe

28 June 2020 28	Beroe	1–2	Levski Sofia	Stara Zagora
21:00 EEST	Kamburov 34'; Vasilev (yellow card) 90+4'	Report	Robertha 22', 72'; Thiam (yellow card) 61'; Z. Dimitrov (yellow card) 90'; Mijatović (yellow card) 90+3'	Stadium: Beroe; Attendance: 2,300; Referee: Valentin Zhelezov; Man of the Match: Nigel Robertha

4 July 2020 29	Levski Sofia	1–2	Slavia Sofia	Sofia
18:00 EEST	S. Ivanov 16'; Robertha (yellow card) 45+1'	Report	Bengyuzov (yellow card) 51'; Iv. Dimitrov 65'; Patev (yellow card) 79'; F. Krastev 85'	Stadium: Vivacom Arena - Georgi Asparuhov; Attendance: 2,100; Referee: Clément Turpin (France); Man of the Match: Filip Krastev

8 July 2020 30	Ludogorets Razgrad	3–0	Levski Sofia	Razgrad
18:30 EEST	Moți 26' (pen.), (yellow card) 87'; Dyakov (yellow card) 28'; Tawatha (yellow card) 45+1'; Tchibota 66', (yellow card) 83'; Biton 76'; Anicet (yellow card) 76'; Badji (yellow card) 86'	Report	Yurukov (yellow card) 18'; Lozev (yellow card) 58'; Goranov (yellow card) 86'	Stadium: Huvepharma Arena; Attendance: 3,500; Referee: Nikolay Yordanov; Man of the Match: Cauly

12 July 2020 31	Levski Sofia	1–2	Lokomotiv Plovdiv	Sofia
21:00 EEST	Nasiru 5'; Spierings (yellow card) 69'; Goranov (yellow card) 82'	Report	Malonga 33', 75'; Malembana (yellow card) 55'; Almeida (yellow card) 59'; Masoero (yellow card) 69'; Petrov (yellow card) 76'	Stadium: Vivacom Arena - Georgi Asparuhov; Attendance: 0 Referee: Dragomir Draganov; Man of the Match: Dominique Malonga

=== Bulgarian Cup ===
25 September 2019 First round	Spartak Varna	1–5	Levski Sofia	Balchik
16:00 EEST	Smirnov (yellow card) 35'; I. Ivanov (yellow card) 43'; Rusev 63'	Report	Mazurek 28'; Kargas (yellow card) 38'; Alar 42'; Nasiru 50'; M. D. Petkov 55', 57'	Stadium: Balchik; Attendance: 850; Referee: Stanislav Todorov

4 December 2019 Second round	Levski Sofia	1–0	Cherno More	Sofia
17:30 EET	Raynov 24'; Kargas (yellow card) 33'; Thiam (yellow card) 52'; Paulinho (yellow card) 59'; S. Ivanov (yellow card) 79'	Report	Panayotov (yellow card) 35'; Panov (yellow card) 51'; Minchev (yellow card) 72'	Stadium: Vivacom Arena - Georgi Asparuhov; Attendance: 1,584; Referee: Nikolay Yordanov

5 March 2020 Quarterfinal	Levski Sofia	0–0 (a.e.t.) (6–5 p)	Ludogorets Razgrad	Sofia
19:00 EET	Reis (yellow card) 26'; Kargas (yellow card) 38'; Thiam (yellow card) 54'; Eyjólfsson (yellow card) 90+3'; Milanov (yellow card) 90+4'	Report	Nedyalkov (yellow card) 17'; Grigore (penalty missed) 90+5'; Cicinho (yellow card) 91'; Świerczok (yellow card) 111'; Marcelinho (yellow card) 117'	Stadium: Vivacom Arena - Georgi Asparuhov; Attendance: 7,500; Referee: Dragomir Draganov
	Penalties
	Milanov (penalty scored); Goranov (penalty scored); Robertha (penalty scored); Spierings (penalty scored); Thiam (penalty scored); Eyjólfsson (penalty scored)		(penalty scored) Moți; (penalty scored) Świerczok; (penalty scored) Grigore; (penalty scored) Cauly; (penalty scored) Marcelinho; (penalty missed) Tchibota

9 June 2020 Semifinal 1st leg	Lokomotiv Plovdiv	2–0	Levski Sofia	Plovdiv
20:30 EEST	D. Iliev 23'; Karagaren (yellow card) 34', (goal) 45'	Report	Thiam (yellow card) 25'; Eyjólfsson (yellow card) 39'; Kargas (yellow card) 51'; Goranov (yellow card) 90+1'	Stadium: Lokomotiv; Attendance: 2,400; Referee: Ivaylo Stoyanov

23 June 2020 Semifinal 2nd leg	Levski Sofia	0–0 (0–2 agg.)	Lokomotiv Plovdiv	Sofia
20:30 EEST	Thiam (yellow card) 38'; Milanov (yellow card) 76'; Kargas (yellow card) 78'	Report	Vitanov (yellow card) 62'; Aralica (yellow card) 75'; Tsvetanov (yellow card) 76'; Karagaren (yellow card) 81'; Lukov (yellow card) 90+5'	Stadium: Vivacom Arena - Georgi Asparuhov; Attendance: 3,400; Referee: Nikola Popov

=== UEFA Europa League ===
==== First qualifying round ====
11 July 2019 1st leg	Ružomberok (Slovakia)	0–2	(Bulgaria) Levski Sofia	Ružomberok, Slovakia
19:30 EEST	Takáč (yellow card) 35'; Novotný (yellow card) 87'	Report	Mariani 36'; Kargas (yellow card) 39'; Goranov (yellow card) 45+1'; Reis (yellow card) 50'; Paulinho 51', (yellow card) 52'; Milanov (yellow card) 58'	Stadium: Štadión pod Čebraťom; Attendance: 3,695; Referee: Petri Viljanen (Finland)

18 July 2019 2nd leg	Levski Sofia (Bulgaria)	2–0 (4–0 agg.)	(Slovakia) Ružomberok	Sofia, Bulgaria
19:30 EEST	Mariani 33', (yellow card) 47'; Alar 90+2'	Report	Gál-Andrezly (yellow card) 50'; Twardzik (yellow card) 66'	Stadium: Vivacom Arena - Georgi Asparuhov; Attendance: 400; Referee: Veaceslav Banari (Moldova)

==== Second qualifying round ====
25 July 2019 1st leg	AEK Larnaca (Cyprus)	3–0	(Bulgaria) Levski Sofia	Larnaca, Cyprus
18:30 EEST	Acorán (yellow card) 27'; Giannou 67'; Raúl 70'; Hevel 75' (yellow card) 76'	Report	Kargas (yellow card) 26'; Milanov (yellow card) 35' (yellow-red card) 45+2'; S. Ivanov (yellow card) 40'; Reis (yellow card) 63'	Stadium: AEK Arena – Georgios Karapatakis; Attendance: 3,177; Referee: Tiago Martins (Portugal)

1 August 2019 2nd leg	Levski Sofia (Bulgaria)	0–4 (0–7 agg.)	(Cyprus) AEK Larnaca	Sofia, Bulgaria
19:30 EEST	D. Ivanov (yellow card) 21'; Goranov (yellow card) 59'; Raynov (yellow card) 62'; Yurukov (yellow card) 80'	Report	Trichkovski 8' (pen.), 29', 75', 82'; Raúl (yellow card) 24'; Thandi (yellow card) 78'	Stadium: Vivacom Arena - Georgi Asparuhov; Attendance: 550; Referee: Glenn Nyberg (Sweden)

== Squad statistics ==
As of matches played on 12 July 2020

No.	Pos	Nat	Player	Total		Parva Liga		Bulgarian Cup		UEFA Europa League	
No.	Pos	Nat	Player	Apps	Goals	Apps	Goals	Apps	Goals	Apps	Goals
1	GK	(Montenegro) MNE	Milan Mijatović	33	0	26	0	3	0	4	0
4	DF	(Bulgaria) BUL	Ivan Goranov	38	2	29	2	5	0	4	0
5	DF	(Iceland) ISL	Hólmar Örn Eyjólfsson	27	3	20+3	3	4	0	0	0
6	DF	(Bulgaria) BUL	Ivaylo Naydenov	15	0	8+4	0	2	0	1	0
7	MF	(Brazil) BRA	Paulinho	36	9	30	8	2	0	4	1
8	MF	(Bulgaria) BUL	Simeon Slavchev	4	1	1+2	1	1	0	0	0
9	FW	(Austria) AUT	Deni Alar	27	4	12+10	2	3	1	1+1	1
10	MF	(Argentina) ARG	Franco Mazurek	30	2	14+11	1	2+1	1	0+2	0
11	MF	(Bulgaria) BUL	Zdravko Dimitrov	17	0	6+5	0	1+1	0	0+4	0
12	GK	(Bulgaria) BUL	Petar Ivanov	0	0	0	0	0	0	0	0
13	GK	(Bulgaria) BUL	Nikolay Mihaylov	1	0	0	0	1	0	0	0
14	MF	(Portugal) POR	Filipe Nascimento	16	2	10+3	2	1+2	0	0	0
17	FW	(Netherlands) NED	Nigel Robertha	24	11	17+2	11	3+1	0	1	0
18	MF	(Ghana) GHA	Nasiru Mohammed	14	2	1+10	1	1+1	1	0+1	0
19	DF	(Greece) GRE	Giannis Kargas	29	0	20+1	0	5	0	3	0
20	DF	(Bulgaria) BUL	Zhivko Milanov	30	0	23	0	3+1	0	3	0
23	MF	(Senegal) SEN	Khaly Thiam	29	2	21	2	4	0	4	0
26	DF	(Bulgaria) BUL	Deyan Lozev	6	0	4+2	0	0	0	0	0
27	GK	(Bulgaria) BUL	Georgi Georgiev	6	0	5	0	1	0	0	0
29	FW	(Bulgaria) BUL	Stanislav Kostov	19	0	5+10	0	1+1	0	2	0
40	MF	(Netherlands) NED	Stijn Spierings	12	2	8+1	2	3	0	0	0
70	MF	(Bulgaria) BUL	Martin Raynov	38	1	28+2	0	3+1	1	4	0
77	MF	(Bulgaria) BUL	Iliya Yurukov	15	0	7+2	0	1+1	0	1+3	0
79	MF	(Bulgaria) BUL	Martin D. Petkov	21	3	0+16	1	0+5	2	0	0
88	MF	(Bulgaria) BUL	Marin Petkov	4	0	0+4	0	0	0	0	0
99	MF	(Bulgaria) BUL	Stanislav Ivanov	35	8	26+1	8	4	0	4	0
Players away from the club on loan:
24	DF	(Bulgaria) BUL	Tomislav Papazov	0	0	0	0	0	0	0	0
39	DF	(Bulgaria) BUL	Deyan Ivanov	2	0	1	0	0	0	1	0
45	FW	(Bulgaria) BUL	Iliya Dimitrov	2	0	0+1	0	0	0	0+1	0
71	MF	(Bulgaria) BUL	Martin P. Petkov	0	0	0	0	0	0	0	0
93	MF	(Bulgaria) BUL	Atanas Kabov	0	0	0	0	0	0	0	0
Players who left Levski Sofia during the season:
2	DF	(France) FRA	Louis Nganioni	0	0	0	0	0	0	0	0
8	MF	(Switzerland) SUI	Davide Mariani	6	6	3	4	0	0	3	2
9	FW	(Romania) ROU	Sergiu Buș	0	0	0	0	0	0	0	0
10	FW	(Brazil) BRA	Rivaldinho	0	0	0	0	0	0	0	0
11	MF	(France) FRA	Anthony Belmonte	0	0	0	0	0	0	0	0
14	MF	(Estonia) EST	Bogdan Vaštšuk	0	0	0	0	0	0	0	0
17	FW	(Kazakhstan) KAZ	Yerkebulan Seydakhmet	0	0	0	0	0	0	0	0
18	DF	(Benin) BEN	Cédric Hountondji	0	0	0	0	0	0	0	0
19	DF	(Serbia) SRB	Miloš Cvetković	0	0	0	0	0	0	0	0
21	MF	(Bulgaria) BUL	Asen Chandarov	4	0	0+3	0	0+1	0	0	0
22	DF	(Portugal) POR	Nuno Reis	25	0	18+1	0	2	0	4	0
26	MF	(Cape Verde) CPV	Jerson Cabral	0	0	0	0	0	0	0	0
28	DF	(Czech Republic) CZE	David Jablonský	0	0	0	0	0	0	0	0
75	MF	(Bulgaria) BUL	Aleks Borimirov	0	0	0	0	0	0	0	0
86	FW	(Bulgaria) BUL	Valeri Bojinov	0	0	0	0	0	0	0	0
89	GK	(Bulgaria) BUL	Nikolay Krastev	0	0	0	0	0	0	0	0
	GK	(Bulgaria) BUL	Aleksandar Lyubenov	0	0	0	0	0	0	0	0
