= Filipe Nascimento =

Portuguese footballer (born 1995)

Personal information
- Full name: Filipe Guterres Nascimento
- Date of birth: 7 January 1995 (age 31)
- Place of birth: Loures, Portugal
- Height: 1.75 m (5 ft 9 in)
- Position: Midfielder

Team information
- Current team: Puszcza Niepołomice
- Number: 8

Youth career
- 2003–2014: Benfica

Senior career*
Years	Team	Apps	(Gls)
2014–2015	Académico Viseu	14	(1)
2015–2017	CFR Cluj	43	(7)
2017	Dinamo București	16	(2)
2018–2020	Levski Sofia	31	(2)
2019	→ Politehnica Iași (loan)	12	(1)
2021–2023	Radomiak Radom	50	(4)
2023–2024	Górnik Zabrze	19	(2)
2023	Górnik Zabrze II	1	(1)
2024–2025	Al Ittihad	4	(0)
2025–	Puszcza Niepołomice	26	(2)

International career
2011	Portugal U16	6	(0)
2012	Portugal U17	7	(0)
2013	Portugal U18	5	(1)
- * Club domestic league appearances and goals as of 20:41, 26 May 2026 (UTC)

Filipe Guterres Nascimento (European Portuguese: [fiˈlipɨ nɐʃiˈmẽtu]; born 7 January 1995) is a Portuguese professional footballer who plays for I liga club Puszcza Niepołomice as a central midfielder.

== Club career ==
Born in Loures, Lisbon District, Nascimento played youth football for S.L. Benfica. In 2014 he signed with Académico de Viseu FC, making his debut as a professional on 27 July in a 4–1 home win against Portimonense S.C. in the first round of the Taça da Liga in which he started.

Nascimento scored his only goal in the Segunda Liga on 23 November 2014, netting from a penalty kick to help to a 3–0 home victory over C.D. Santa Clara. He subsequently moved to the Romanian Liga I, where he represented CFR Cluj and FC Dinamo București.

On 29 January 2018, Nascimento moved clubs and countries again, signing with Bulgaria's PFC Levski Sofia. He returned to the Romanian top division the following year, on a loan at FC Politehnica Iași.

Nascimento joined Radomiak Radom of the Polish I liga on 23 February 2021. He won promotion to the Ekstraklasa in his first season, as champion.

On 3 July 2023, after suffering a knee injury in early January that ruled him out for the remainder of the campaign, Nascimento left Radomiak at the end of his contract and signed for another top-tier team, Górnik Zabrze. In September 2024, he joined Egyptian Premier League side Al Ittihad Alexandria Club on a three-year deal.

On 11 August 2025, Nascimento returned to Poland to join I liga club Puszcza Niepołomice.

== Career statistics ==
As of match played 9 May 2026

Appearances and goals by club, season and competition
Club	Season	League			National cup (Note: Includes Taça de Portugal, Cupa României, Bulgarian Cup, Polish Cup)		League cup (Note: Includes Taça da Liga, Cupa Ligii, Egyptian League Cup)		Continental		Other		Total	
Club	Season	Division	Apps	Goals	Apps	Goals	Apps	Goals	Apps	Goals	Apps	Goals	Apps	Goals
Académico Viseu	2014–15	Segunda Liga	14	1	0	0	3	0	—		—		17	1
CFR Cluj	2015–16	Liga I	18	1	5	0	1	0	—		—		24	1
CFR Cluj	2016–17	Liga I	25	6	2	0	2	0	—		0	0	29	6
CFR Cluj	Total		43	7	7	0	3	0	—		0	0	53	7
Dinamo București	2017–18	Liga I	16	2	1	0	—		2 (Note: Appearances in UEFA Europa League)	0	—		19	2
Levski Sofia	2017–18	First League (Bulgaria)	10	0	3	0	—		0	0	—		13	0
Levski Sofia	2018–19	First League (Bulgaria)	8	0	2	1	—		0	0	—		10	1
Levski Sofia	2019–20	First League (Bulgaria)	13	2	3	0	—		0	0	—		16	2
Levski Sofia	Total		31	2	8	1	—		0	0	—		39	3
Politehnica Iași (loan)	2018–19	Liga I	12	1	—		—		—		—		12	1
Radomiak Radom	2020–21	I liga	11	1	—		—		—		—		11	1
Radomiak Radom	2021–22	Ekstraklasa	26	0	0	0	—		—		—		26	0
Radomiak Radom	2022–23	Ekstraklasa	13	3	2	2	—		—		—		15	5
Radomiak Radom	Total		50	4	2	2	—		—		—		52	6
Górnik Zabrze	2023–24	Ekstraklasa	13	1	2	0	—		—		—		15	1
Górnik Zabrze	2024–25	Ekstraklasa	6	1	0	0	—		—		—		6	1
Górnik Zabrze	Total		19	2	2	0	—		—		—		21	2
Górnik Zabrze II	2023–24	III liga	1	1	—		—		—		—		1	1
Al Ittihad	2024–25	Egyptian Premier League	4	0	0	0	1	0	—		—		5	0
Puszcza Niepołomice	2025–26	I liga	26	2	2	0	—		—		—		28	2
Career total			216	22	22	3	7	0	2	0	0	0	247	25

== Honours ==
Benfica

- UEFA Youth League runner-up: 2013–14

CFR Cluj

- Cupa României: 2015–16
- Supercupa României runner-up: 2016

Levski Sofia

- Bulgarian Cup runner-up: 2017–18

Radomiak Radom

- I liga: 2020–21
