= Hólmar Örn Eyjólfsson =

Icelandic footballer

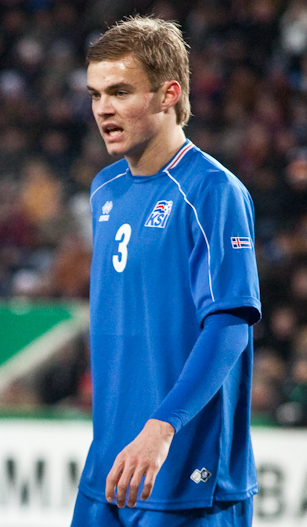
- Hólmar with Iceland U21 in 2010

Personal information
- Full name: Hólmar Örn Eyjólfsson
- Date of birth: 6 August 1990 (age 36)
- Place of birth: Sauðárkrókur, Iceland
- Height: 1.90 m (6 ft 3 in)
- Positions: Centre back; defensive midfielder

Team information
- Current team: Valur
- Number: 15

Youth career
- 1995–1997: Tindastóll
- 1997–2007: HK

Senior career*
Years	Team	Apps	(Gls)
2007–2008	HK	19	(0)
2008–2011	West Ham United	0	(0)
2009	→ Cheltenham Town (loan)	4	(0)
2010	→ Roeselare (loan)	9	(0)
2011–2013	VfL Bochum II	9	(0)
2011–2014	VfL Bochum	45	(1)
2014–2017	Rosenborg	65	(4)
2017–2018	Maccabi Haifa	16	(0)
2017–2018	→ Levski Sofia (loan)	25	(1)
2018–2020	Levski Sofia	32	(5)
2020–2021	Rosenborg	26	(3)
2022–	Valur	105	(6)

International career^{‡}
2006–2007	Iceland U17	12	(0)
2007–2008	Iceland U19	8	(0)
2007–2012	Iceland U21	27	(2)
2012–2020	Iceland	19	(2)
- * Club domestic league appearances and goals as of 16 November 2026 ‡ National team caps and goals as of 18 November 2020

Hólmar Örn Eyjólfsson (born 6 August 1990) is an Icelandic footballer who plays as a centre-back for Úrvalsdeild karla club Valur and the Iceland national team. He is the son of Eyjólfur Sverrisson, former Iceland international and manager.

== Club career ==
=== Handknattleiksfélag Kópavogs ===
Born in Sauðárkrókur, Iceland, Eyjólfsson moved to Stuttgart, German when his father played for Stuttgart, where during his three years stay in the country, he spoke a little German. After returning to Iceland, Eyjólfsson first joined FC Tindastóll when he was five years old. When Eyjólfsson was seven years old, his family moved to Kópavogur and then joined HK when he was ten years old, starting out his professional football career. There, he began his career at and began taking football seriously.

After progressing through the ranks at the club, Eyjólfsson finally made his Handknattleiksfélag Kópavogs debut on 13 May 2007 against Víkingur when he was sixteen years old and started the whole the game to help the club keep a clean sheet, in a 0–0 draw. After making his Handknattleiksfélag Kópavogs debut, Eyjólfsson signed a contract extension with the club. Following this, he received a handful of first team football, playing in the centre–back position despite being suspended on three occasions for picking up a total of six yellow cards. His performance led German clubs, such as, Hertha BSC and Bayern Munich, who both offered him a trial, but Eyjólfsson ended up staying at Handknattleiksfélag Kópavogs. At the end of the 2007 season, he went on to finish his first season, making twelve appearances in all competitions and helped the club finish ninth place, just two points away from relegation. For his performance, Eyjólfsson was named Handknattleiksfélag Kópavogs’ most promising player of the year at the club's ceremony.

Ahead of the 2008 season, Eyjólfsson signed a contract extension with Handknattleiksfélag Kópavogs, keeping him until 2009. He continued to establish himself in the first team, playing in the centre–back position despite missing a total of four matches in the first half of the season. Eyjólfsson made his last appearance for the club came on 23 June 2008 against Knattspyrnufélag Reykjavíkur, which saw Handknattleiksfélag Kópavogs lost 3–0. By the time he departed from the club, Eyjólfsson made eight appearances in all competitions.

=== West Ham United ===
Eyjólfsson signed for Premier League side West Ham United on 6 July 2008 from Icelandic team HK, where he previously made 19 first team appearances. Eyjólfsson previously went on trial with the club earlier this year.

After missing out due to an injury, he appeared in West Ham United's friendly matches throughout the club's pre–season tour. His performance in the pre-season at West Ham United was praised, which according to the club's website, they wrote "that the Icelander had a great game and never got into trouble against the opposition team's forwards". Throughout the 2008–09 season at West Ham United, Eyjólfsson never played a single match in the first team and mostly spent his time, playing for the club's reserve side.

Despite being loaned out twice during the 2009–10 season, Eyjólfsson was featured five times for West Ham United's reserve side and was captain at one point. Following the end of the 2009–10 season, he returned to the club's reserve side and continued to remain involved in a number of matches, but suffered an injury along the way through the 2010–11 season. On 16 April 2011, he announced his intention to leave West Ham United when his contract ran out without having played a first-team game for the club. His departure from West Ham United was confirmed on 17 May 2011 when the club would not be renewing his contract. Eyjólfsson later spoke about his time at West Ham United, saying: "I lacked perspective in England. I saw no way to get as much time at West Ham as I would like. And especially at my age, it is important to be able to develop further."

==== Loan spells from West Ham United ====
On 1 October 2009, Eyjólfsson signed on loan for EFL League Two side Cheltenham Town on a one-month loan. Two days later on 3 October 2009, he made his full debut for the club, in a 1–1 home draw against Notts County. He returned to his parent club in November 2009 having made four appearances for Cheltenham Town.

On 9 January 2010, Eyjólfsson joined Belgian Roeselare on loan, until the end of the season. Upon joining the club, he joined Roeselare to get more playing time and to make him more stronger. Eyjólfsson made his Roeselare debut on 16 January 2010, starting the whole game, in a 2–1 loss against Mechelen. Since joining the club, he quickly established himself in the first team, playing in the centre–back position. After suffering from a minor ailments, Eyjólfsson returned to the starting line–up against K.V.S.K. United in the league's relegation play–offs and set up a goal for Nikita Rukavytsya, in a 2–1 win. However, he was unable to prevent the Roeselare's relegation to the Belgian Second Division. At the end of the 2009–10 season, Eyjólfsson went on to make sixteen appearances in all competitions for the club. For his performance, he was named one of the five best players by the club despite only appearing in the second half of the season. Following this, Eyjólfsson returned to his parent club.

=== VfL Bochum ===
Eyjólfsson signed for German 2. Bundesliga team, Bochum, on 27 June 2011, signing a three-year contract, keeping him until 2014. Upon joining the club, the club's sports director Jens Todt commented on his move, quoting: "Holmar is a tough teamplayer who wants to get through like his father in Germany". He later said that his father advised him to move to Germany, citing "its football is played very seriously here."

However, weeks after joining the club, Eyjólfsson suffered an injury that kept him out for two months after undergoing surgery. After returning from injury late–September, he spent the next two months on the substitute bench and only played three times on the reserve side. Eyjólfsson made his debut for Bochum, coming on as a late substitute for Marcel Maltritz, in a 6–0 win over Erzgebirge Aue on 4 December 2011. His next appearance came against Hansa Rostock on 5 February 2012 when he made his first start and set up a goal for Nikoloz Gelashvili, who scored a winning goal, in a 2–1 win. Having started out on the substitute bench since returning from injury, Eyjólfsson was given a handful of first team appearances for the rest of the 2011–12 season. At the end of the 2011–12 season, he went on to make eleven appearances in all competitions.

At the start of the 2012–13 season, Eyjólfsson found himself in and out of the starting line–up for VfL Bochum. As a result, he appeared three times in the club's reserve side. However, in a match against Dynamo Dresden on 8 December 2012, Eyjólfsson was sent-off for a straight red card for kicking Lynel Kitambala in the 35th minute, in a 3–0 win. After the match, it was announced that he would be serving a three match suspension. Amid to the suspension, Eyjólfsson was expected to be loaned out for the rest of the season, due to lack of playing time at VfL Bochum, but he ended up staying at the club. After serving a three match suspension, he returned to the starting line–up against 1860 Munich on 15 February 2013 but was sent-off for a straight red card in the 17th minute, in a 1–0 win. Shortly after, Eyjólfsson had his suspension overturned, allowing him to let him play the next match. During a 2–1 loss against FC Ingolstadt 04 on 10 March 2013, he suffered a concussion after a collision and was substituted in the 45th minute. But Eyjólfsson was able to make a quick recovery and cleared to start in the next match. Following this, he started in the next six matches but was at fault for conceding goals that saw VfL Bochum lose four consecutive matches between 10 March 2013 and 5 April 2013. After recovering from a muscular problems, Eyjólfsson was dropped to the substitute bench in the club's remaining matches of the 2012–13 season, though he came on as a substitute for a match against 1. FC Köln on 4 May 2013. At the end of the 2012–13 season, Eyjólfsson finished his second season at VfL Bochum, making nineteen appearances in all competitions.

At the start of the 2013–14 season, Eyjólfsson found his playing time, mostly coming from the substitute bench, due to facing new competitions, as well as, his own injury concern. As a result, he continued to feature for the club's reserve side, appearing three times. Following the absence of regular right–back, Paul Freier, Eyjólfsson was called up for his replacement and started in a number of matches, playing in the right–back position. He then played a role in a match against St. Pauli on 15 February 2014 by scoring only goal of the game and helping Bochum keeping a clean sheet, in a 1–0 win. However, Eyjólfsson was soon dropped from the starting line–up and found his playing time, coming from the substitute bench. Despite this, he started the whole game, in a 1–0 win over Karlsruher SC on 11 May 2014, a win that saw the club promoted to Bundesliga next season. At the end of the 2013–14 season, Eyjólfsson made nineteen appearances and scoring once in all competitions. Following this, he was released by Bochum after a three-year spell at the club.

=== Rosenborg ===
On 11 August 2014, Eyjólfsson joined Norwegian side Rosenborg, signing a one-year contract with the club, with an option of extending for two years. He was previously linked with a move to Swedish side Helsingborg before having a medical at Rosenberg.

Eyjólfsson made his Rosenberg debut on 24 August 2014, coming as a late substitute, in a 2–0 win over Sarpsborg 08. Following this, he quickly established himself in the first team, forming a centre–back partnership with Tore Reginiussen for the rest of the 2014 season. Eyjólfsson then scored his first goal for the club on 28 September 2014, in a 3–0 win over Aalesunds. His performance led Reginiussen praising him, saying: "It has worked well. Hólmar is good at talking and good at taking responsibility. He is simply a very good player who is easy to play with." Eyjólfsson helped Rosenberg finish second place in the league, as he made ten appearances and scoring once in all competitions.

Ahead of the 2015 season, Eyjólfsson signed a three-year contract with Rosenberg, keeping him until 2018. However, he suffered a toe injury and was expected to miss the start of the season. But Eyjólfsson recovered and made his first appearance of the season, coming on for the injured Reginiussen in the 65th minute and helped the club win 5–1 in the opening game of the season against Aalesunds. Two weeks later, on 18 April 2015, he set up a goal for Tobias Mikkelsen, in a 1–1 draw against Strømsgodset. Since the start of the 2015 season, Eyjólfsson quickly established himself in the first team, forming a centre–back partnership with Stefan Strandberg until his departure from the club. This lasted until he missed one match, due to picking up five yellow cards so far this season. Eyjólfsson returned to the starting line–up against Víkingur in the first leg of the UEFA Europa League first round, to help Rosenberg keep a clean sheet, in a 2–0 on 2 July 2015. In the return leg, he helped the club advance to the next round after keeping another clean sheet, in a 0–0 draw. Since returning from suspension, Eyjólfsson continued to regain his place in first team, forming a centre–back partnership with new signing, Johan Lædre Bjørdal. In a match against Lillestrøm on 9 August 2015, he set up two goals for Pål André Helland and Bjørdal, in a 5–0 win. This was followed up by scoring his first goal of the season, seven days later on 16 August 2015, in a 2–0 win against Vålerenga. Eyjólfsson played in both legs of the UEFA Europa League's play–off round against FCSB and helped Rosenberg win 3–1 on aggregate to advance to the group stage. During which, he helped the club keep five consecutive clean sheets between 9 August 2015 and 23 August 2015. Eyjólfsson started in a match against Haugesund on 1 November 2015 and played 72 minutes before being substituted, as the club won 4–3, a result that saw the side become the league champions for the first time since 2010. After missing a match in the last game of the season against Aalesunds, he returned to the starting line–up against Sarpsborg 08 in the Norwegian Football Cup Final and helped Rosenberg win 2–0, resulting in the club earning a double. At the end of the 2015 season, Eyjólfsson went on to make forty-eight appearances and scoring once in all competitions.

At the start of the 2016 season, Eyjólfsson made his first appearance of the season, starting the whole game, in a 1–0 loss against Odds in the opening game of the season. After missing one match, he returned to the starting line–up against Vålerenga on 2 April 2016 and helped Rosenberg keep a clean sheet, in a 1–0 win. Eyjólfsson then played two out of the club's next three matches, as he helped Rosenberg keep five consecutive clean sheets between 19 March 2016 and 16 April 2016. A week later on 24 April 2016, Eyjólfsson scored his first goal of the season, in a 4–0 win over Viking. Since the start of the 2016 season, he continued to establish himself in the starting eleven, forming a centre–back partnership with either Reginiussen, Jørgen Skjelvik and Bjørdal. Eyjólfsson scored his second goal of the season, scoring from a header, in a 3–1 win against IFK Norrköping in the first leg of the UEFA Champions League second round on 13 July 2016. In the return leg, he helped the club advance to the next round despite losing 3–2, which Rosenberg won 5–4 on aggregate. After being dropped to the substitute bench for two matches, Eyjólfsson returned to the starting line–up against Viking on 11 August 2016 and helped the club keep a clean sheet, in a 2–0 win. Following this, he regained his first team place, forming a centre–back partnership with Reginiussen, Skjelvik and Bjørdal. Eyjólfsson then started the whole game against Molde on 24 September 2016, and helped the club keep a clean sheet win 4–0 to become champions for the second time in a row. He then scored his third goal of the season, in a 2–0 win over Bodø/Glimt in the last game of the season, which saw the opposition team relegated. Eyjólfsson then started the whole game against Kongsvinger in the final of the Norwegian Football Cup and helped Rosenberg win 4–0 to win the Cup for the second time, just as it was in the league. Despite being absent on three occasions during the 2016 season, he went on to make thirty-five appearances and scoring two times in all competitions.

Towards the end of the 2016 season, Eyjólfsson was linked a move away from the club when La Liga side Real Betis was interested in signing him over the summer, but the move never materialised. Following the end of the 2016 season, he was subjected of a transfer bid from Maccabi Haifa.

=== Maccabi Haifa ===
Eyjólfsson signed a 4.5-year contract for Israeli Premier League team Maccabi Haifa on 23 December 2016. Upon joining the club, he was joined by his fellow Icelandic Viðar Örn Kjartansson, who is at Maccabi Tel Aviv. Upon joining the club, Hólmar was given a number fifteen shirt.

Eyjólfsson made his debut for Maccabi Haifa, starting the whole game, in a 2–0 loss against Maccabi Petah Tikva on 14 January 2017. Since joining the club, he became a first team regular, playing in the centre–back position. Eyjólfsson started in every match until he missed two matches, due to a groin injury. It wasn't until on 13 May 2017 when Eyjólfsson made his return to the starting line–up, in a 2–0 loss against Bnei Sakhnin. His return was short–lived when he was sent–off for a second bookable offence, in a 0–0 draw against Maccabi Petah Tikva in the last game of the season. At the end of the 2016–17 season, Eyjólfsson went on to make sixteen appearances in all competitions. He later reflected his time at Maccabi Haifa, saying: "Two months after my arrival in Maccabi Haifa, the coach and sports director were fired and taken away. In the summer, the new mentor decided to hire six new foreigners, but I had a 4-year contract and it would be difficult to break up. It was not very easy to find a solution. However, I am happy that we succeeded. And it was good."

=== Levski Sofia ===
On 1 September 2017, Eyjólfsson was loaned for four years to Bulgarian club Levski Sofia. He previously turned down a move to the club a week before.

Having appeared three times as an unused substitute, Eyjólfsson made his debut for the Levski Sofia, starting the whole game throughout 120 minutes, to help the club beat Botev Galabovo in the first round of the Bulgarian Cup on 19 September 2017. He then made his league debut for Levski Sofia, starting the whole game, and helped the club keep a clean sheet in a 0–0 draw against PFC Beroe on 25 September 2017. This was followed by helping Levski Sofia keep two clean sheets in the next two matches against Cherno More and Etar. Eyjólfsson helped the club keep five consecutive clean sheets in five league matches between 4 November 2017 and 2 December 2017. Since making his debut for Levski Sofia, he quickly established himself in the first team, forming a centre–back partnership with David Jablonský. Eyjólfsson then scored his first goal for the club, scoring from a header, in a 2–0 win against FC Vereya on 21 April 2018. He played in both legs against rivals, CSKA Sofia in the semi–finals of the Bulgarian Cup and helped the club win 4–2 on aggregate to advance to the final. Eyjólfsson started in the final against Slavia Sofia on 9 May 2018 and played throughout 120 minutes in a 0–0 draw, as Levski Sofia lost 4–2 on penalties. Despite missing three matches later in the 2017–18 season, he went on to make thirty–one appearances and scoring once in all competitions. Following this, Eyjólfsson was permanently transferred to Levski Sofia for a fee of €500,000 .

Eyjólfsson's first game after signing for the club on a permanent basis came in the opening game of the 2018–19 season against Botev Plovdiv, coming on as a 76th-minute substitute, in a 1–0 win. Since the start of the 2018–19 season, he continued to establish himself in the first team, forming a centre–back partnership with Jablonský. Eyjólfsson then scored his first goal of the season, scoring from a header, in a 2–1 win against Dunav Ruse on 11 August 2018. His second goal of the season came on 26 October 2018, once again scoring from a header, in a 7–0 win against FC Vereya. In a follow–up match against Cherno More in the second round of the Bulgarian Cup, however, he suffered a serious injury on his knee and was substituted in the 8th minute, as Levski Sofia lost 5–4 on penalties following a 2–2 draw. After it was announced that Eyjólfsson would be sidelined for the rest of the 2018–19 season.

Up until August 2019, Eyjólfsson continued to recover from his knee injury and attended rehabilitation sessions. He made his first appearance of the season, coming on as an 83rd-minute substitute, in a 4–0 win against Vitosha Bistritsa on 17 August 2019. Following his return from injury, Eyjólfsson started out on the substitute bench before regaining his first team place, forming a centre–back partnership with either Giannis Kargas and Nuno Reis. He then scored his first goal of the season, scoring from a header, in a 3–1 win against Botev Vratsa on 28 September 2019 and was named Man of the match for his performance. Eyjólfsson was named September's Player of the Month. He scored two goals in two matches between 31 October 2019 and 6 November 2019 against Dunav Ruse and Etar. Eyjólfsson helped Levski Sofia keep three consecutive clean sheets in three matches between 8 December 2019 and 15 February 2020. His performance attracted interests from European clubs in the January transfer window, but he stayed at the club. Since returning from injury, Eyjólfsson started in every match until he missed one match against Slavia Sofia on 1 March 2020, due to suspension. Shortly after, his performance, once again, earned him February's Player of the Month. However, the season was suspended because of the COVID-19 pandemic and by that time, Eyjólfsson made nineteen appearances in all competitions. As a result of the pandemic, he was one of the players to agree a salary reduction of 50%. Once the season resumed behind closed doors, Eyjólfsson remained an integral part of the team, making six more appearances. This lasted until he suffered a hernia injury and was sidelined for the rest of the 2019–20 season following a successful surgery. At the end of the 2019–20 season, Eyjólfsson went on to make twenty–three appearances and scoring three times in all competitions.

Even after the January transfer window closed, Eyjólfsson continued to be linked a move away from Levski Sofia and reports continued to speculate throughout the summer transfer window. It was reportedly expected in April that the club wanted to sell six foreigners, including Eyjólfsson, which was later revealed of selling the players was the high salaries. A month later, he said about his uncertainty on his future at Levski Sofia. Amid the transfer speculation, he was not included in the club's training and did not return to the country, making his intention clear of leaving Levski Sofia.

=== Return to Rosenborg ===
On 19 September 2020, Eyjólfsson returned to Rosenborg, signing a three–year contract with the club. Over the summer, Rosenborg was interested in signing him for the second time. As a result of the move, Levski Sofia would not receive a compensation for the player, due to difficulties, regarding his former club, Maccabi Haifa.

He was immediately inserted into the first team and made his second debut for the club, starting the whole game, in a 2–1 win against Haugesund on 20 September 2020. Since joining Rosenborg for the second time, Eyjólfsson quickly established himself in the first team, reuniting with his centre–back partner, Reginiussen. He then scored his first goal for the club, scoring a last minute goal, in a 3–2 loss against Brann on 24 November 2020. Despite missing one match throughout the 2020 season, Eyjólfsson made twelve appearances and scoring once in all competitions.

== International career ==
=== Youth career ===
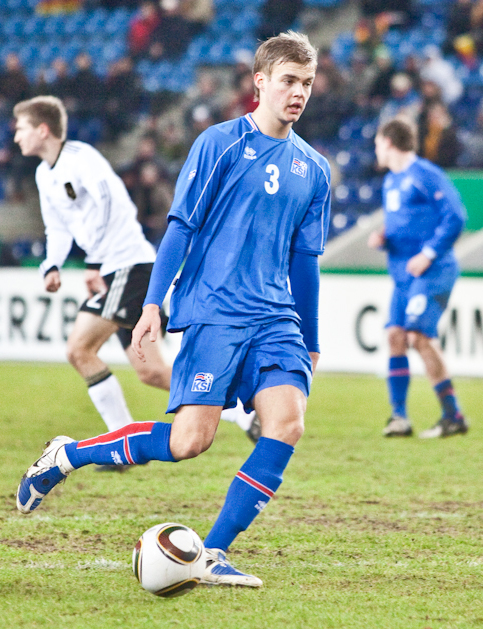
Eyjólfsson preparing to take a kick during a match against Germany U21 in 2010.

In July 2006, Eyjólfsson was called up to the Iceland U17 for the first time. After making his debut for the U17 national team, he started in a number of matches for the Iceland U17 for the rest of 2006. In April 2007, Eyjólfsson was called up to the U17 national team squad for the UEFA European U-17 Championship. He was a key player at the 2007 European U-17 Championship and, although Iceland failed to make it beyond the group stage, was named by UEFA as one of the tournament's players to watch in future. Those finals in Belgium also saw him show his versatility as Eyjólfsson played in a holding midfield role, although he prefers to play at the back. Following the end of the tournament, Eyjólfsson played televe times for Iceland U17.

In August 2007, Eyjólfsson was called up to the Iceland U19 squad for the first time. He made his U19 national team debut, starting the whole game, starting the whole game, in a 3–0 win against Scotland U19 on 8 September 2007. Eyjólfsson later made eight appearances for Iceland U19 between 2007 and 2008.

Eyjólfsson was called by Iceland U21 for the first time on 6 November 2007. He made his U21 national team debut on 16 November 2007 against Germany U21, coming on as a second-half substitute, in a 3–0 win. While still in the U19s and had an instant impact, Eyjólfsson helped Iceland U21 gave their first win of the 2009 European Championship qualifying campaign matches with a 2–1 victory in Belgium U21. He was in the starting line-up for the next five matches throughout 2008, as Iceland U21 failed to make the play–offs. It wasn't until on 26 May 2009 when Eyjólfsson was called up to the U21 national team squad for the first time in eight months. He started in Iceland U21's match against Denmark U21, losing 3–2 on 5 June 2009. Eyjólfsson scored his first international goal in a 9 October 2009 in the 2011 European Championship qualifier, which Iceland won 8–0 against San Marino U21. He became a regular starter in the U21 national team for the 2011 European Championship qualifying campaign matches and helped Iceland U21 qualify for the tournament. Eyjólfsson then scored a winning goal for Iceland U21 and set up the opening goal of the game, in a 2–1 win against England U21 on 28 March 2011.

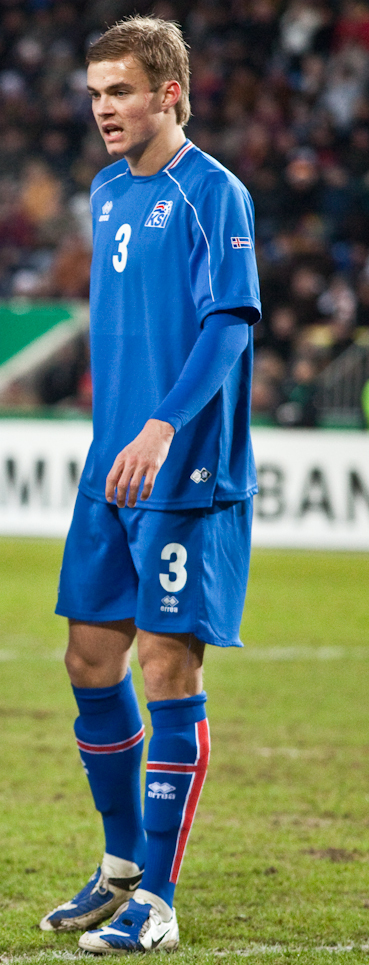
Eyjólfsson preparing to take a kick during a match against Germany U21 in 2010.

In May 2011, Eyjólfsson was chosen for the UEFA European Under-21 Championship squad. He played three times in the tournament, as the U21 national team were eliminated in the Group stage. Eyjólfsson then captained Iceland U21 for the first time, losing 3–0 against England U21 on 6 October 2011. He later captained the U21 national team in the next two matches against Azerbaijan U21. In a match against Belgium U21 on 10 September 2012, Eyjólfsson made his twenty–seventh appearances for Iceland U21, breaking a record and started the whole game, as the U21 national team lost 5–0, in what turned out to be last appearance.

=== Senior career ===
Eyjólfsson received his first call-up to the Iceland national team in May 2012 in a friendly against Sweden. Shortly after, he made his senior debut on 30 May 2012, coming on as a substitute for Kári Árnason in the 83rd minute, in a 3–2 loss. Following this, Eyjólfsson appeared three times as an unused substitute for the next two years. After a year absence, he was called up to the Iceland squad on 10 November 2014 as a replacement for Árnason, who suffered an injury. Two days later on 12 November 2014, Eyjólfsson made his first appearance in two years for Iceland against Belgium, coming on as an 84th-minute substitute, in a 3–1 loss.

It wasn't until on 2 October 2015 when Eyjólfsson was called up to the national team squad for the first time in almost eleven months. A month later, he made his first start for Iceland against Poland on 13 November 2015, as the national team side lost 4–2. In May 2016, Eyjólfssonwas called up by the national team for the UEFA Euro 2016 squad, but was on the stand-by instead. He later expressed his disappointment of not being included in the squad, in which Rosenberg manager Kåre Ingebrigtsen agreed with. Following the tournament, Eyjólfsson didn't make an appearance for Iceland until on 15 November 2016 when he started a match and played 80 minutes before being substituted, in a 2–0 win against Malta. After not playing for the national team for ten months, Eyjólfsson made his seventh appearance for Iceland against Indonesia on 11 January 2018, starting a match and scoring his first goal, in a 6–0 win. In May 2018, he was named in the national team's 23 man squad for the FIFA World Cup in Russia. However, due to competitions, Eyjólfsson never played in the tournament, as Iceland were eliminated from the Group stage.

Following the tournament, Eyjólfsson made two appearances for the national team by the end of the year, starting a match against France and Switzerland. After a year absence, he was called up to Iceland national team squad on 9 November 2019, but appeared as an unused substitute for both matches. It wasn't until on 16 January 2020 when Eyjólfsson made his appearance for the national team in a year against Canada and scored his second goal for Iceland, in a 1–0 win. He later made five more appearances by the end of the year and made three starts.

== Personal life ==
In November 2015, Eyjólfsson became a father when his partner, Jona, gave birth to a baby girl, Sylvia. In December 2018, the couple were married, having been dating for eight years. In March 2020, Eyjólfsson became a second time father when Jona gave birth to a baby boy.

Growing up, Eyjólfsson said he grew up idolising Gabriel Batistuta, Raúl and Steven Gerrard. In addition to speaking Icelandic, Eyjólfsson speaks German, Norwegian and English.

== Career statistics ==
=== Club ===
As of 17 October 2021

Appearances and goals by club, season and competition
Club	Season	League			Cup		Continental		Total	
Club	Season	Division	Apps	Goals	Apps	Goals	Apps	Goals	Apps	Goals
HK	2007	Úrvalsdeild	12	0	1	0	—		13	0
HK	2008	Úrvalsdeild	7	0	1	0	—		8	0
HK	Total		19	0	2	0	0	0	21	0
West Ham United	2008–09	Premier League	0	0	0	0	—		0	0
West Ham United	2010–11	Premier League	0	0	0	0	—		0	0
West Ham United	Total		0	0	0	0	0	0	0	0
Cheltenham Town (loan)	2009–10	League Two	4	0	0	0	—		4	0
Roeselare (loan)	2009–10	Belgian Pro League	9	0	3	0	—		12	0
VfL Bochum II	2011–12	Regionalliga West	3	0	—		—		3	0
VfL Bochum II	2012–13	Regionalliga West	3	0	—		—		3	0
VfL Bochum II	2013–14	Regionalliga West	3	0	—		—		3	0
VfL Bochum II	Total		9	0	0	0	0	0	9	0
VfL Bochum	2011–12	2. Bundesliga	11	0	0	0	—		11	0
VfL Bochum	2012–13	2. Bundesliga	16	0	3	0	—		19	0
VfL Bochum	2013–14	2. Bundesliga	18	1	1	0	—		19	1
VfL Bochum	Total		45	1	4	0	0	0	49	1
Rosenborg	2014	Tippeligaen	10	1	0	0	0	0	10	1
Rosenborg	2015	Tippeligaen	28	1	7	0	13	0	48	1
Rosenborg	2016	Tippeligaen	27	1	2	0	6	1	35	2
Rosenborg	Total		65	3	9	0	19	1	93	4
Maccabi Haifa	2016–17	Israel Premier League	16	0	0	0	0	0	16	0
Levski Sofia (loan)	2017–18	Bulgarian First League	25	1	6	0	0	0	31	1
Levski Sofia	2018–19	Bulgarian First League	12	2	2	0	0	0	14	2
Levski Sofia	2019–20	Bulgarian First League	20	3	1	0	0	0	21	3
Levski Sofia	Total		32	5	3	0	0	0	35	5
Rosenborg	2020	Eliteserien	10	1	0	0	2	0	12	1
Rosenborg	2021	Eliteserien	13	2	0	0	6	0	19	2
Rosenborg	Total		23	3	0	0	8	0	31	3
Career total			247	13	27	0	27	1	301	14

=== International ===
As of match played 18 November 2020

Appearances and goals by national team and year
National team	Year	Apps	Goals
Iceland	2012	1	0
Iceland	2013	0	0
Iceland	2014	1	0
Iceland	2015	1	0
Iceland	2016	2	0
Iceland	2017	1	0
Iceland	2018	6	1
Iceland	2019	0	0
Iceland	2020	7	1
Total		19	2

Scores and results list Iceland's goal tally first, score column indicates score after each Hólmar goal.

List of international goals scored by Hólmar Örn Eyjólfsson
No.	Date	Venue	Opponent	Score	Result	Competition
1	15 January 2020	Championship Soccer Stadium, Irvine, United States	Canada	1–0	1–0	Friendly

== Honours ==
Rosenborg

- Norwegian League: 2015, 2016
- Norwegian Football Cup: 2015, 2016
