= James Lawrie =

Northern Irish footballer

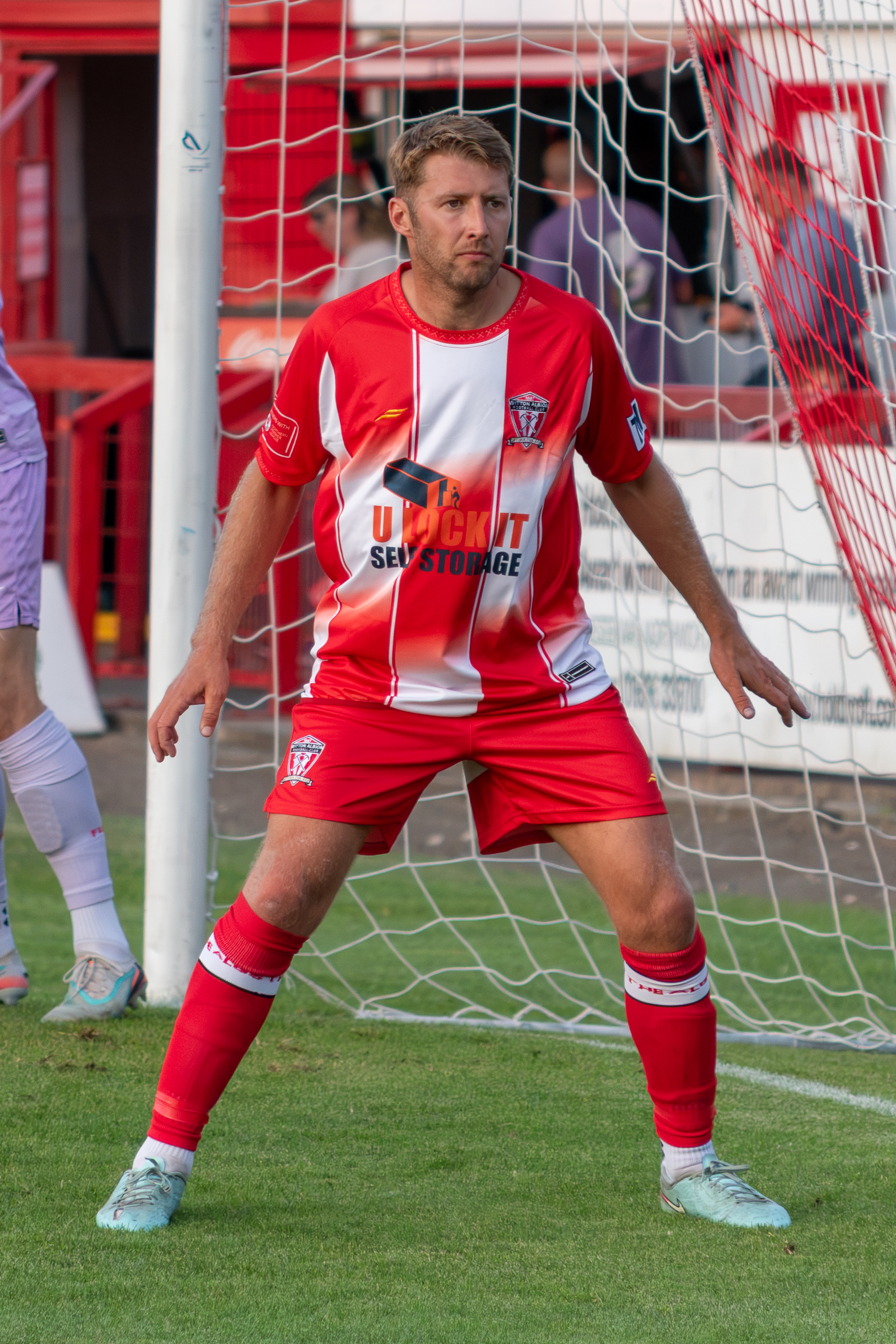
- Lawrie playing for Witton Albion in 2026

Personal information
- Full name: James Lawrie
- Date of birth: 18 December 1990 (age 35)
- Place of birth: Dundonald, Northern Ireland
- Height: 6 ft 0 in (1.83 m)
- Position: Striker

Youth career
- ?–2007: Port Vale

Senior career*
| Years | Team | Apps | (Gls) |
| 2007–2010 | Port Vale | 27 | (2) |
| 2010 | → Kidderminster Harriers (loan) | 10 | (1) |
| 2010–2011 | AFC Telford United | 23 | (4) |
| 2011 | → Altrincham (loan) | 11 | (4) |
| 2011–2017 | Altrincham | 228 | (40) |
| 2017–2018 | Hednesford Town | 45 | (7) |
| 2018–2021 | Nantwich Town | 82 | (11) |
| 2021–2022 | Witton Albion | 27 | (3) |
| 2022 | Hanley Town | | |
| Total | | 453 | (72) |

International career
| 2007 | Northern Ireland U17 | 4 | (1) |
| 2008–2009 | Northern Ireland U19 | 9 | (5) |
| 2008–2011 | Northern Ireland U21 | 9 | (2) |
| 2009 | Northern Ireland B | 1 | (0) |
| 2009–2010 | Northern Ireland | 3 | (0) |
- * Club domestic league appearances and goals

James Lawrie (born 18 December 1990) is a Northern Irish former professional footballer. The striker represented Northern Ireland at youth level and won three senior caps.

One of the most promising players to come through the Port Vale youth system in the 2000s, during the summer of 2009, he picked up interest from top-flight clubs. However, he was released by the club in the summer of 2010 after only featuring in a handful of games and signed with AFC Telford United. He was loaned out to Altrincham in 2011, signed permanently with the club in December that year, and helped the club to win promotion out of the Conference North via the play-offs in 2014. He signed with Hednesford Town in June 2017 and then moved on to Nantwich Town 12 months later. After three years with Nantwich, he moved on to Witton Albion in October 2021 and joined Hanley Town in July 2022.

== Club career ==
=== Port Vale ===
Born in Dundonald, County Down, Lawrie attended Middlewich High School in Middlewich, Cheshire, England. Lawrie worked his way through the Port Vale youth team and in July 2007 was offered his first professional contract. His first league goal came in the 89th minute against Chester City on 27 January 2009, the goal was so well taken that it earned him the club's goal of the season award. Following that game manager Dean Glover stated his belief that Lawrie had a bright future in football and two days later signed Lawrie up to a two-and-a-half-year deal. Lawrie repaid these kind words the next month in a BBC interview; accepting responsibility for Vale's low standing on behalf of the players, as opposed to bad-management on Glover's part. On 4 April he gained his second club goal in a 1–1 draw with Bury, again impressing with his performance.

The young striker's progress attracted attention from top flight clubs during the 2009–10 pre-season. The Daily Star reported that David Moyes was interested in bringing Lawrie in for a trial at Everton. Vale chairman Bill Bratt did in fact give permission for a trial, Lawrie spending the last week of July with the "Toffees", though manager Micky Adams denied it being a trial per se. Regardless of semantics, nothing came of the week at Goodison Park, Everton having apparently ended their interest in the young striker. Adams believed the experience benefited the player: "All these experiences can help James and benefit him in the long term." He was transfer listed in late September, along with the entire Port Vale squad, after manager Micky Adams saw his team slip to a third consecutive defeat.

Lawrie joined Kidderminster Harriers on a one-month loan in February 2010. The deal was made to get Lawrie games at the Conference level, as he was unable to break into the Vale first-team all season. This deal was then extended until the conclusion of the 2009–10 season. He finished the season with one goal in twelve appearances for the "Harriers". In April 2010, he learned that he would not be offered a new contract by manager Micky Adams.

=== AFC Telford United ===
In July 2010, Lawrie joined League One club Exeter City on a two-week trial. Lawrie was not offered a contract after an unsuccessful trial. He then joined Football League newboys Stevenage on trial, before trying his luck at Morecambe, again of League Two. He ended up signing a one-year deal with AFC Telford United of the Conference North. This was seen as quite a coup for the club.

He scored on his Telford debut, in a 5–0 thumping of Hyde United on 14 August. Despite this he was forced to wait on the substitute bench for a number of weeks before earning his first start for the club. He got his second goal in November, against Droylsden, before getting a brace against Hinckley United in January. He hoped this brace would prove enough to win him a first-team place. However, the next month he was sidelined with an ankle injury, and struggled to regain his place in the side upon his recovery. Telford managed to win promotion to the Conference National after a play-off final win over Guiseley – the "Stags" had finished the league campaign in second place.

=== Altrincham ===
On transfer deadline day, 31 August 2011, he joined Altrincham back in the Conference North on loan for a month. His loan was extended until 28 November and he scored four goals in eleven appearances, playing mostly as a winger. After his loan spell ended he was released by Telford and joined Altrincham permanently. The club missed out on the play-offs by 11 points in 2011–12. Altrincham reached the play-offs in 2012–13 but were beaten 4–2 by Brackley Town in the play-off semi-finals. The "Robins" again qualified for the play-offs in the 2013–14 campaign, and Lawrie scored the winning goal against Hednesford Town at Moss Lane at the semi-final stage. Lawrie then went on to score in the final as the club secured promotion with a 2–1 extra time victory over Guiseley.

He scored eight goals in 46 appearances in the 2014–15 season, as Altrincham finished 17th in the Conference Premier. He scored five goals in 50 games in the 2015–16 campaign, as Altrincham were relegated in 22nd place. He scored eight goals in 51 games in the 2016–17 campaign, however, the club continued to struggle and were relegated out of the National League North in last place after winning just four of their 42 league matches.

=== Northern Premier League ===
Lawrie joined Northern Premier League Premier Division club Hednesford Town in June 2017. The "Pitmen" finished 17th in the 2017–18 campaign and Lawrie scored seven goals in 35 starts and eight substitute appearances, being named as man of the match on two occasions.

On 18 June 2018, he and teammate Danny Glover both signed with Nantwich Town, also of the Northern Premier League Premier Division. He lifted the Cheshire Senior Cup with the club after playing in the 5–2 final victory over Cammell Laird 1907. He also helped the "Dabbers" to reach the play-offs, where they were beaten by Warrington Town in the semi-finals. He scored eight goals and provided nine assists over 47 appearances in the 2018–19 season. As a result of the COVID-19 pandemic in England, the 2019–20 season was formally abandoned on 26 March 2020, with all results from the season being expunged. The 2020–21 season was also curtailed with only six games played on 24 February 2021. In September 2021, Lawrie was released by Nantwich, shortly after reaching 100 club appearances. The following month, he signed for league rivals Witton Albion. He featured 28 times in the 2021–22 campaign, scoring three goals, as Albion were relegated.

In July 2022, Lawrie joined Northern Premier League Division One West club Hanley Town following their promotion. Hanley finished 16th at the end of the 2022–23 season.

== International career ==
=== Youth level ===
Lawrie earned four caps in the under-17 side, scoring against Iceland to earn a 2–2 draw after coming on as a substitute on 19 March 2007. In the under-19 side, Lawrie scored three goals in his first six games. His first came against Belgium in a 5–4 victory Milk Cup on 30 July 2008; Lawrie scored the opener and was described as a "dominant figure". His second goal was against Iceland in a 2–0 win on 8 September. His third came against England in a 3–1 loss on 10 October. He won his first caps for the under-21 side on 19 August 2008, coming on as a substitute in a 1–0 friendly defeat to Poland. Later in the month, he was also a substitute in a 4–1 loss to Ukraine and two months later he came on in a 3–1 win over Scotland. Lawrie was then called up to the Northern Ireland B team for a friendly with the Scotland B team on 6 May 2009. Upon announcing the teenagers call-up manager Nigel Worthington stated his belief that Lawrie would earn a full cap in the future. He came on as a 31st minute substitute.

Following his senior debut, he continued at youth level in the 2009 Northern Ireland Youth Soccer Tournament, Lawrie scored the under-19's last minute winner over Germany at the Riada Stadium, the game finishing 3–2. Two days later he scored the opener of a 3–0 win over Bulgaria. In the final, the Irish beat Denmark 2–0, Lawrie providing the cross for Josh Magennis to score the opener. Lawrie came away with the Player of the Tournament award "The One". His fourth under-21 cap came on 12 August 2009, as he won a penalty in a 2–1 friendly defeat to Portugal. The next month he missed out on further call-ups to the under-21 squad, as he had an operation to remove his appendix. He returned to the squad following his recovery, scoring in a 2–1 defeat in Iceland in the 2011 under-21 Euro qualifier.

=== Senior team ===
In May 2009, it was announced that Lawrie was to be called up to the full Northern Ireland squad for the first time in a friendly with Italy on 6 June 2009. He picked up his first senior cap in the game, coming on as a late substitute as the Italians came out 3–0 winners. His second cap came a year later in a friendly with Turkey.

== Career statistics ==
=== Club ===
Appearances and goals by club, season and competition
| Club | Season | League | | | FA Cup | | League Cup | | Other | | Total | |
| Club | Season | Division | Apps | Goals | Apps | Goals | Apps | Goals | Apps | Goals | Apps | Goals |
|---|---|---|---|---|---|---|---|---|---|---|---|---|
| Port Vale | 2007–08 | League One | 6 | 0 | 1 | 0 | 0 | 0 | 0 | 0 | 7 | 0 |
| Port Vale | 2008–09 | League Two | 18 | 2 | 1 | 0 | 0 | 0 | 0 | 0 | 19 | 2 |
| Port Vale | 2009–10 | League Two | 3 | 0 | 0 | 0 | 0 | 0 | 1 (Note: Appearance(s) in the EFL Trophy.) | 0 | 4 | 0 |
| Port Vale | Total | | 27 | 2 | 2 | 0 | 0 | 0 | 1 | 0 | 30 | 2 |
| Kidderminster Harriers (loan) | 2009–10 | Conference National | 10 | 1 | 0 | 0 | — | | 0 | 0 | 10 | 1 |
| AFC Telford United | 2010–11 | Conference North | 23 | 4 | 0 | 0 | — | | 2 (Note: Appearance(s) in the FA Trophy.) | 0 | 25 | 4 |
| AFC Telford United | 2011–12 | Conference National | 0 | 0 | 0 | 0 | — | | 0 | 0 | 0 | 0 |
| AFC Telford United | Total | | 23 | 4 | 0 | 0 | 0 | 0 | 2 | 0 | 25 | 4 |
| Altrincham | 2011–12 | Conference North | 35 | 10 | 1 | 0 | — | | 2 | 0 | 38 | 10 |
| Altrincham | 2012–13 | Conference North | 38 | 8 | 3 | 1 | — | | 5 | 1 | 46 | 10 |
| Altrincham | 2013–14 | Conference North | 39 | 7 | 0 | 0 | 0 | 0 | 5 | 2 | 44 | 9 |
| Altrincham | 2014–15 | Conference Premier | 42 | 7 | 2 | 1 | — | | 2 | 0 | 46 | 8 |
| Altrincham | 2015–16 | National League | 44 | 4 | 3 | 0 | — | | 3 | 1 | 50 | 5 |
| Altrincham | 2016–17 | National League North | 41 | 8 | 2 | 0 | — | | 8 | 1 | 51 | 9 |
| Altrincham | Total | | 239 | 44 | 11 | 2 | 0 | 0 | 25 | 5 | 275 | 51 |
| Hednesford Town | 2017–18 | Northern Premier League; Premier Division | 45 | 7 | 0 | 0 | — | | 0 | 0 | 45 | 7 |
| Nantwich Town | 2018–19 | Northern Premier League; Premier Division | 39 | 5 | — | | 0 | 0 | 8 | 3 | 47 | 8 |
| Nantwich Town | 2019–20 | Northern Premier League; Premier Division | 28 | 5 | 5 | 0 | — | | 3 (Note: 2 appearances in the Cheshire Senior Cup and 1 appearance in the FA Trophy) | 1 | 36 | 6 |
| Nantwich Town | 2020–21 | Northern Premier League; Premier Division | 6 | 1 | 3 | 0 | — | | 4 | 0 | 13 | 1 |
| Nantwich Town | 2021–22 | Northern Premier League; Premier Division | 9 | 0 | 1 | 1 | — | | 0 | 0 | 10 | 1 |
| Nantwich Town | Total | | 82 | 11 | 9 | 1 | 0 | 0 | 15 | 4 | 106 | 16 |
| Witton Albion | 2021–22 | Northern Premier League; Premier Division | 27 | 3 | 0 | 0 | — | | 1 | 0 | 28 | 3 |
| Career total | | | 453 | 72 | 22 | 3 | 0 | 0 | 44 | 9 | 519 | 84 |

=== International ===
International statistics
| National team | Year | Apps | Goals |
|---|---|---|---|
| Northern Ireland | 2009 | 1 | 0 |
| Northern Ireland | 2010 | 2 | 0 |
| Total | | 3 | 0 |

== Honours ==
Northern Ireland under-19s

- Milk Cup: 2009

AFC Telford United

- Conference North play-offs: 2010–11

Altrincham

- Conference North play-offs: 2013–14

Nantwich Town

- Cheshire Senior Cup: 2019

Individual

- Milk Cup Player of the Tournament: 2009
