= 2024–25 Al Ittihad Alexandria Club season =

Al Ittihad
2024–25 season
- Chairman: Mohamed Moselhy
- Manager: Nikodimos Papavasiliou (until 7 January); Talaat Youssef (from 7 January)
- Stadium: Alexandria Stadium
- Egyptian Premier League: 11th
- Egypt Cup: Round of 32
- Egyptian League Cup: Group stage
- Top goalscorer: League: Emmanuel Apeh; Van Derrick Bekalé Aubame; Fady Farid (1 each); All: Emmanuel Apeh; Van Derrick Bekalé Aubame; Fady Farid (1 each)
- All statistics correct as of 11 January 2025.

The 2024–25 season is the 111th season in Al Ittihad Alexandria Club's history and the 54th consecutive season in the Premier League. In addition to the domestic league, Al Ittihad is set to compete in the domestic cup, the Egyptian League Cup.

== Transfers ==
=== In ===
Date	Pos.	Player	From	Fee	Ref.
4 August 2024	DF	(Egypt) Hamed El Gabry	(Egypt) Haras El Hodoud	Free	
23 August 2024	MF	(Egypt) Ahmed El Shimi	(Egypt) Al Mokawloon Al Arab	Free	
26 August 2024	FW	(Egypt) Amr Gomaa	(Egypt) Raya SC	€22,000	
2 September 2024	DF	(Egypt) Marwan Dawoud	(Egypt) ENPPI	Loan	
4 September 2024	MF	(Egypt) Abdelrahman Khaled	(Kuwait) Al-Arabi	Free	
5 September 2024	DF	(Egypt) Abdallah Bakri	(Egypt) ZED	Loan	
8 September 2024	FW	(Egypt) Fady Farid	(Egypt) Smouha	€126,000	
9 September 2024	DF	(Egypt) Mahmoud Metwalli	(Egypt) Al Ahly	Free	
14 September 2024	DF	(Egypt) Mohamed El Maghrabi	(Egypt) Al Ahly	Free	
16 September 2024	MF	(Portugal) Filipe Nascimento	(Poland) Górnik Zabrze	Free	
22 September 2024	FW	(Nigeria) Emmanuel Apeh	(Azerbaijan) Sabah	Free	
24 October 2024	FW	(Nigeria) Sadiq Isyaka	(Nigeria) Niger Tornadoes	Loan	
24 October 2024	GK	(Egypt) Ahmed Daador	(Egypt) Pyramids	Free	
4 January 2025	MF	(Egypt) Youssef Osama	(Egypt) Pyramids	Loan	

=== Out ===
Date	Pos.	Player	To	Fee	Ref.
13 August 2024	FW	(Angola) Mabululu	(Libya) Al Ahli Tripoli	€1,350,000	
20 August 2024	DF	(Egypt) Sherif Reda	(Egypt) Smouha	Loan return	
20 August 2024	DF	(Egypt) Hesham Salah	(Egypt) National Bank	€221,000	
21 August 2024	DF	(Tunisia) Seif Teka	(Egypt) Wadi Degla	Contract terminated	
21 August 2024	MF	(Egypt) Ahmed Adel	(Egypt) ZED	End of contract	
29 August 2024	MF	(Egypt) Khaled El Ghandour	(Egypt) Al Masry	End of contract	
2 September 2024	DF	(Niger) Alhabib Hassane		Contract terminated	
2 September 2024	DF	(Egypt) Ahmed Ghoneim	(Egypt) Petrojet	Contract terminated	
2 September 2024	MF	(Egypt) Fawzi El Henawy	(Egypt) Haras El Hodoud	Contract terminated	
3 September 2024	GK	(Egypt) Omar Salah	(Egypt) Petrojet		
6 September 2024	FW	(Egypt) Ragab Omran	(Egypt) Tala'ea El Gaish	Released	
6 September 2024	MF	(Egypt) Belal El Sayed	(Egypt) El Gouna		
9 September 2024	DF	(Egypt) Islam Abou Salima	(Egypt) Haras El Hodoud	Contract terminated	
8 October 2024	MF	(Egypt) Hamed El Gabry	(Egypt) Tala'ea El Gaish	Contract terminated	

== Friendlies ==
12 September 2024 Friendly	Al Ittihad (Egypt)	3–1	(Egypt) Ashab Al-Giyad	Alexandria
	Omilkan; El-Wahsh (pen.); Farid			Stadium: Alexandria Stadium
Note: Three periods

19 September 2024 Friendly	Al Ittihad (Egypt)	v	(Egypt) Delphi SC

19 September 2024 Friendly	Al Ittihad (Egypt)	1–2	(Egypt) Sporting	Alexandria
	Aubame	Report	Abdel Halim	Stadium: Alexandria Stadium
Note: Three periods

26 September 2024 Friendly	Al Ittihad (Egypt)	2–2	(Libya) Al-Nasr	Borg El Arab, Alexandria
	Gomaa; Boateng	Report

2 October 2024 Friendly	Al Ittihad (Egypt)	3–1	(Egypt) Ghazl El Mahalla	Alexandria
16:30 UTC+3	Farid 20'; Boateng 70'		Zaky 79'	Stadium: Alexandria Stadium

3 October 2024 Friendly	Al Ittihad (Egypt)	1–1	(Egypt) ZED	Alexandria
				Stadium: Alexandria Stadium

9 October 2024 Friendly	Al Ittihad (Egypt)	v	(Egypt) Smouha	Alexandria
				Stadium: Alexandria Stadium

10 October 2024 Friendly	Al Ittihad (Egypt)	1–2	(Egypt) ENPPI	Alexandria
	Apeh 80'		Labib 30'; Kabou 31'	Stadium: Alexandria Stadium

17 October 2024 Friendly	Haras El Hodoud (Egypt)	0–0	(Egypt) Al Ittihad	Alexandria
		Report		Stadium: Haras El Hodoud Stadium

15 November 2024 Friendly	Al Ittihad (Egypt)	1–1	(Egypt) Smouha	Alexandria
14:30 UTC+2	El Deeb	Report	Hassan	Stadium: Alexandria Stadium

1 December 2024 Friendly	Al Ittihad (Egypt)	1–0	(Egypt) Al Ittihad Youth	Alexandria
	El Shimi	Report

10 December 2024 Friendly	Al Ittihad (Egypt)	2–1	(Egypt) Fleet Club	Alexandria
	Nascimento; El Maghrabi	Report

16 January 2025 Friendly	Al Ittihad (Egypt)	7–0	(Egypt) Shabab El Dabaa
	Youssef Osama; Islam Samir; Al-Maghribi; Emmanuel; Karim El-Deeb; Amr Gomaa; Moamen Sherif

== Competitions ==
=== Overall record ===
Competition	First match	Last match	Starting round	Final position	Record							
Competition	First match	Last match	Starting round	Final position	Pld	W	D	L	GF	GA	GD	Win %
Egyptian Premier League	1 November 2024	30 May 2025	Matchday 1		8	2	3	3	3	5	−2	25.00
Egypt Cup	5 January 2025		Round of 32	Round of 32	1	0	0	1	0	2	−2	0.00
Egyptian League Cup	17 December 2024		Group stage		1	0	0	1	0	2	−2	0.00
Total					10	2	3	5	3	9	−6	20.00

Last updated: 11 January 2025
Source: Competitions

=== Egyptian Premier League ===
==== Regular season ====
Pos	Team	Pld	W	D	L	GF	GA	GD	Pts	Qualification or relegation
11	ZED	17	4	9	4	15	13	+2	21	Qualification for the relegation play-offs
12	Smouha	17	6	2	9	13	22	−9	20	Qualification for the relegation play-offs
13	Al Ittihad	17	4	6	7	11	16	−5	18	Qualification for the relegation play-offs
14	Ghazl El Mahalla	17	5	2	10	16	24	−8	17	Qualification for the relegation play-offs
15	El Gouna	17	4	5	8	10	15	−5	17	Qualification for the relegation play-offs

Source: Soccerway (regular season)
Rules for classification: 1) Points; 2) Goal difference; 3) Goals scored.

Pos	Team	Pld	W	D	L	GF	GA	GD	Pts	Qualification
1	Al Ahly (C)	8	6	1	1	22	9	+13	58 (Note: Al Ahly were initially deducted three points for refusing to play their away fixture against Zamalek, scheduled to be played on 11 March 2025. The points deduction was later cancelled by the Egyptian Premier League.)	Qualification for the Champions League first or second round
2	Pyramids	8	4	2	2	15	10	+5	56	Qualification for the Champions League first or second round
3	Zamalek	8	4	3	1	14	6	+8	47	Qualification for the Confederation Cup first or second round
4	Al Masry	8	3	3	2	10	9	+1	42	Qualification for the Confederation Cup first or second round
5	National Bank of Egypt SC	8	2	3	3	13	12	+1	38	
6	Ceramica Cleopatra	8	4	1	3	15	12	+3	37	
7	Pharco	8	2	3	3	8	16	−8	32	
8	Petrojet	8	1	2	5	7	17	−10	27	
9	Haras El Hodoud	8	0	2	6	3	16	−13	24	

Source: Soccerway (championship round)
Rules for classification: 1) Points; 2) Goal difference; 3) Goals scored; 4) Play-off tie.
(Note: Clubs qualified for this phase with the full regular season points they got, but without goals for or against)
(C) Champions
Notes:

Pos	Team	Pld	W	D	L	GF	GA	GD	Pts
4	ENPPI	8	4	3	1	8	5	+3	27
5	Modern Sport	8	5	2	1	12	7	+5	26
6	Al Ittihad	8	1	5	2	3	5	−2	26
7	Smouha	8	0	5	3	2	6	−4	25
8	Ismaily	8	2	3	3	7	7	0	23

Source: Soccerway (relegation round)
Rules for classification: 1) Points; 2) Goal difference; 3) Goals scored; 4) Play-off tie.
(Note: Clubs qualified for this phase with the full regular season points they got, but without goals for or against)

==== Results summary ====
Overall								Home						Away					
Pld	W	D	L	GF	GA	GD	Pts	W	D	L	GF	GA	GD	W	D	L	GF	GA	GD
8	2	3	3	3	5	−2	9	1	1	2	1	2	−1	1	2	1	2	3	−1

Last updated: 11 January 2025.

==== Results by round ====
Round	1	2	3	4	5	6	7	8	9
Ground	A	H	A	H	A	H	A	H	A
Result	W	W	D	L	D	D	L	L	
Position	5	3	4	5	7	7			

Updated to match(es) played on 11 January 2025. Source:
A = Away; H = Home; W = Win; D = Draw; L = Loss

==== Matches ====
The league schedule was released on 19 October 2024.

1 November 2024 1	Pharco	0–1	Al Ittihad	Alexandria
17:00 UTC+2			Apeh 66'	Stadium: Borg El Arab Stadium; Referee: Abdel Aziz El-Sayed

7 November 2024 2	Al Ittihad	1–0	Haras El Hodoud	Alexandria
17:00 UTC+2	Farid 51'			Stadium: Alexandria Stadium; Referee: Mohamed El Hanafy

22 November 2024 3	Al Ahly	1–1	Al Ittihad	Cairo
20:00 UTC+2	Ashour (penalty missed) 44'; El Solia 67' (pen.)		Aubame 87'	Stadium: Al Salam Stadium; Referee: Mohamed Maarouf
Note: The match was held at Al Salam Stadium instead of Cairo International Stadium.

30 November 2024 4	Al Ittihad	0–1	Tala'ea El Gaish	Alexandria
20:00 UTC+2			Omran 90+4'	Stadium: Alexandria Stadium; Referee: Ahmed El Ghandour

21 December 2024 5	Ghazl El Mahalla	0–0	Al Ittihad	El Mahalla El Kubra
17:00 UTC+2				Stadium: Ghazl El Mahalla Stadium; Referee: Mostafa El Shahdi

25 December 2024 6	Al Ittihad	0–0	Modern Sport	Alexandria
17:00 UTC+2				Stadium: Alexandria Stadium; Referee: Mohamed El Hanafi

29 December 2024 7	Zamalek	2–0	Al Ittihad	Cairo
20:00 UTC+2	Mansi 66'; El Deeb 72' (o.g.)		Mohamed (yellow card) 45+2' (yellow-red card) 57'	Stadium: Cairo International Stadium; Referee: Ahmed El Ghandour

11 January 2025 8	Al Ittihad	0–1	ZED	Alexandria
20:00 UTC+2			Dilson 33'	Stadium: Alexandria Stadium

22 January 2025 9	Ceramica Cleopatra	v	Al Ittihad	Cairo
19:00 UTC+2

=== Egypt Cup ===
5 January 2025 Round of 32	Al Ittihad	0–2	Team FC	Alexandria
17:30 UTC+2			Saber 10', 36' (pen.)	Stadium: Alexandria Stadium; Referee: Galal Ahmed

=== Egyptian League Cup ===
==== Group stage ====
Pos	Team	Pld	W	D	L	GF	GA	GD	Pts	Qualification
1	Haras El Hodoud	3	3	0	0	5	1	+4	9	Advance to knockout stage
2	Ismaily	3	1	1	1	5	4	+1	4	Advance to knockout stage
3	Pyramids	3	1	1	1	4	4	0	4	
4	Al Ittihad	3	0	0	3	0	5	−5	0	

Source: EPL
Rules for classification: Group stage tiebreakers

17 December 2024 1	Pyramids	2–0	Al Ittihad	Cairo
19:00 UTC+2	El Karti 64'; El Gabbas 88'			Stadium: Al Salam Stadium; Referee: Mahmoud El Banna
Note: The match was moved from the 30 June Stadium due to maintenance.

22 March 2025 2	Al Ittihad	v	Haras El Hodoud	Alexandria
21:00 UTC+2				Stadium: Alexandria Stadium

22 April 2025 3	Ismaily	v	Al Ittihad	Ismailia
20:00				Stadium: Ismailia Stadium
