= 2009 Northern Ireland Youth Soccer Tournament =

2009 Milk Cup
- The Milk Cup Logo

Tournament details
- Country: Northern Ireland
- Teams: 6 (Elite); 24 (Premier); 20 (Juniors)

Final positions
- Champions: Northern Ireland (Elite); Manchester United (Premier); Everton (Juniors)

The 2009 Milk Cup Tournament edition was a prestigious association football tournament divided into three categories: Elite, Premier, and Junior for differing age groups. It ran between 27 and 31 July.

The Elite section had six teams in 2009, divided into two groups of three followed by a playoff, whilst the Junior and Premier sections were contested by 24 and 20 teams, respectively. Each team played once on Monday and Tuesday as part of a league, from which the top eight teams qualified for the Milk Cup quarter-finals on Wednesday. The remainder of the teams qualify for other cups that run alongside the Milk Cup, with quarter-finals on the Wednesday, semi-finals on Thursday, and the finals on Friday.

- Elite – Under 19s – national sides
- Premier – Under 17s – club sides and national sides
- Junior – Under 15s – club sides and national sides

Clubs and national teams from anywhere in the world may compete on invitatio

== Venues ==
- Anderson Park, Coleraine
- University Coleraine
- Rugby Avenue, Coleraine
- Coleraine Showgrounds
- Limavady Showgrounds
- Roe Mill, Limavady
- Ballymoney Showgrounds
- Riada Stadium
- Ballymena Showgrounds
- Parker Avenue Portrush
- The Warren, Portstewart
- Mullaghacall
- Castlerock
- Broughshane

== Elite Section ==
=== Participants ===
- Bulgaria
- Denmark
- Germany
- Israel
- Northern Ireland
- United States

=== Matches ===
27 July 2009
19:00

Northern Ireland	3–2	Germany
O'Kane 45', 55'; Lawrie 89'	Report	Evseev 45'; Volland 80'

Riada Stadium, Ballymoney

27 July 2009
20:00

Israel	0–2	Bulgaria

Showgrounds, Ballymena

27 July 2009
20:00

United States	1–2	Denmark

Showgrounds, Coleraine

29 July 2009
20:00

Bulgaria	0–3	Northern Ireland

Showgrounds, Coleraine

29 July 2009
20:00

Denmark	1–1	Israel

Riada Stadium, Ballymoney

29 July 2009
20:00

Germany	1–1	United States

Showgrounds, Ballymena

==== Play-Offs ====
31 July 2009
11:00

Israel	1–1	United States
Penalties
	4–5

31 July 2009
13:00

Bulgaria	0–5	Germany

==== Final ====
31 July 2009
18:00

Northern Ireland	2–0	Denmark

== Premier Section ==
- (England) Burnley
- (Republic of Ireland) Cherry Orchard
- (Peru) Club Cantolao
- (Northern Ireland) County Antrim
- (Northern Ireland) County Armagh
- (Northern Ireland) County Down
- (Northern Ireland) County Fermanagh
- (Northern Ireland) County Londonderry
- (Northern Ireland) County Tyrone
- (Mexico) Cruz Azul
- (Brazil) Desportivo Brasil
- (Portugal) Porto
- (Turkey) Fenerbahçe
- (England) Manchester United
- (New Zealand) Otago United
- (Republic of Ireland) Shamrock Rovers
- (England) Sheffield United
- (United States) South Coast Bayern
- (Russia) Trudovye Rezervy
- (England) Watford

== Junior Section ==
- (Denmark) AB
- (Sweden) AIK
- (England) Chelsea
- (Mexico) Club Necaxa
- (Mexico) Pachuca
- (Northern Ireland) County Antrim
- (Northern Ireland) County Armagh
- (Northern Ireland) County Down
- (Northern Ireland) County Fermanagh
- (Northern Ireland) County Londonderry
- (Northern Ireland) County Tyrone
- (Republic of Ireland) Donegal Schoolboys
- (Republic of Ireland) Dundalk Schoolboys
- (England) Everton
- (England) Hull City
- (Israel) Maccabi Haifa
- (Israel) Maccabi Tel Aviv
- (Republic of Ireland) North Dublin Schoolboys
- (England) Plymouth Argyle
- (Scotland) Queen of the South
- (Russia) Spartak Moscow
- (England) Swindon Town
- (Israel) The Football Academy of Jerusalem
- (England) Watford
