= 2011 UEFA European Under-21 Championship qualification Group 5 =

Football tournament qualification stage

The teams competing in Group 5 of the 2011 UEFA European Under-21 Championships qualifying competition were Czech Republic, Germany, Iceland, Northern Ireland and San Marino.

== Standings ==
Team	Pld	W	D	L	GF	GA	GD	Pts	(Czech Republic)	(Iceland)	(Germany)	(Northern Ireland)	(San Marino)
Czech Republic	8	7	1	0	25	4	+21	22	—	3–1	1–1	2–0	5–0
Iceland	8	5	1	2	29	11	+18	16	0–2	—	4–1	2–1	8–0
Germany	8	3	3	2	26	10	+16	12	1–2	2–2	—	3–0	6–0
Northern Ireland	8	2	1	5	12	16	−4	7	1–2	2–6	1–1	—	4–0
San Marino	8	0	0	8	0	51	−51	0	0–8	0–6	0–11	0–3	—

== Matches ==
9 June 2009
20:30 CEST

San Marino	0–8	Czech Republic
	Report	Pekhart 19', 31', 38'; Hořava 29'; Valenta 45'; Dočkal 49' (pen.), 69'; Chramosta 86'

Stadio Olimpico, Serravalle
Referee: Huw Jones (Wales)

12 August 2009
17:30 CEST

Iceland	0–2	Czech Republic
	Report	Rabušic 58'; Čelůstka 79'

KR-völlur, Reykjavík
Referee: Euan Norris (Scotland)

4 September 2009
18:00 CEST

Germany	6–0	San Marino
Naki 4'; Boateng 19'; Hummels 31'; Schieber 33', 56'; Höwedes 41'	Report

Tivoli, Aachen
Referee: Goran Spirkoski (Macedonia)
4 September 2009
20:00 CEST

Czech Republic	2–0	Northern Ireland
Gecov 72'; Dočkal 83'	Report

Chance Arena, Jablonec nad Nisou
Referee: Thomas Vejlgaard (Denmark)

8 September 2009
20:15 CEST

Germany	1–2	Czech Republic
Hummels 90+2' (pen.)	Report	Rabušic 21', 70' (pen.)

BRITA-Arena, Wiesbaden
Referee: Stuart Attwell (England)
8 September 2009
20:30 CEST

Northern Ireland	2–6	Iceland
Magennis 58', 76'	Report	Viðarsson 15' (pen.); Gunnarsson 32'; Finnbogason 42'; Gíslason 44', 64'; Guðmundsson 57'

The Showgrounds, Coleraine
Referee: Tamás Bognár (Hungary)

9 October 2009
21:00 CEST

Iceland	8–0	San Marino
Guðmundsson 4', 40', 86'; Eyjólfsson 24'; Gislason 25', 75' (pen.); Ormarsson 79'; Steindórsson 89'	Report

Laugardalsvöllur, Reykjavík
Referee: Richard Trutz (Slovakia)

13 October 2009
17:00 CEST

Iceland	2–1	Northern Ireland
Guðmundsson 56'; Josefsson 70'	Report	Lawrie 80'

Grindavíkurvöllur, Grindavík
Referee: Fritz Stuchlik (Austria)

13 November 2009
19:30 CEST

San Marino	0–6	Iceland
	Report	Sigþórsson 8'; Sigurðsson 15', 31'; Viðarsson 18' (pen.); Finnbogason 60', 82'

Stadio Olimpico, Serravalle
Referee: Luc Wilmes (Luxembourg)
13 November 2009
20:00 CEST

Northern Ireland	1–1	Germany
Norwood 90+4'	Report	Choupo-Moting 89'

The Oval, Belfast
Referee: Duarte Nuno Pereira Gomes (Portugal)

17 November 2009
20:30 CEST

San Marino	0–11	Germany
	Report	Hummels 4', 56', 71' (pen.); Choupo-Moting 11'; Schwaab 31' (pen.); Badstuber 33'; Schürrle 44'; Sam 49'; Müller 58'; Sukuta-Pasu 69'; Bargfrede 82'

Stadio Olimpico, Serravalle
Referee: Igor Ishchenko (Ukraine)
17 November 2009
20:45 CEST

Northern Ireland	1–2	Czech Republic
Norwood 82'	Report	Zeman 36'; Kozák 38'

The Showgrounds, Ballymena
Referee: Alexandru Deaconu (Romania)

2 March 2010
17:45 CEST

Germany	2–2	Iceland
Gebhart 10'; Schieber 50'	Report	Sigþórsson 13'; Viðarsson 77'

MDCC-Arena, Magdeburg
Referee: Georgios Daloukas (Greece)
2 March 2010
20:30 CEST

San Marino	0–3	Northern Ireland
	Report	Norwood 24', 78'; Lawrie 38'

Stadio Olimpico, Serravalle
Referee: Emir Alečković (Bosnia and Herzegovina)

11 August 2010
18:00 CEST

Czech Republic	5–0	San Marino
Pekhart 3', 14', 40'; Kovařík 22'; Chramosta 47' (pen.)	Report

Stadion Juliska, Prague
Referee: Vitaly Sevostyanik (Belarus)
11 August 2010
18:15 CEST

Iceland	4–1	Germany
Bjarnason 5'; Sigurðsson 53'; Sigþórsson 54'; Finnbogason 84'	Report	Großkreutz 49'

Kaplakrikavöllur, Hafnarfjörður
Referee: Espen Berntsen (Norway)

3 September 2010
18:30 CEST

Czech Republic	1–1	Germany
Mareček 38'	Report	Kirchhoff 71'

Městský, Mladá Boleslav
Referee: Andrea De Marco (Italy)
3 September 2010
20:45 CEST

Northern Ireland	4–0	San Marino
Little 4', 85' (pen.); McGivern 15' (pen.); Millar 90+2'	Report

The Showgrounds, Coleraine
Referee: Ioannis Anastasiou (Cyprus)

7 September 2010
17:00 CEST

Germany	3–0	Northern Ireland
Holtby 42', 60'; Herrmann 67'	Report

Sportpark, Ingolstadt
Referee: Hannes Kaasik (Estonia)
7 September 2010
17:00 CEST

Czech Republic	3–1	Iceland
Vácha 20'; Pekhart 65'; Kovařík 68'	Report	Finnbogason 80'

Chance Arena, Jablonec nad Nisou
Referee: Hüseyin Göçek (Turkey)

== Goalscorers ==
As of 3 September, there have been 85 goals scored over 18 games, for an average of 4.72 goals per game.

Goals	Player	Country
7	Tomáš Pekhart	Czech Republic
5	Mats Hummels	Germany
5	Jóhann Berg Guðmundsson	Iceland
4	Alfreð Finnbogason	Iceland
4	Rúrik Gíslason	Iceland
4	Oliver Norwood	Northern Ireland
3	Julian Schieber	Germany
3	Bořek Dočkal	Czech Republic
3	Michael Rabušic	Czech Republic
3	Gylfi Sigurðsson	Iceland
3	Kolbeinn Sigþórsson	Iceland
3	Bjarni Viðarsson	Iceland
2	Jan Chramosta	Czech Republic
2	Eric Maxim Choupo-Moting	Germany
2	James Lawrie	Northern Ireland
2	Andrew Little	Northern Ireland
2	Josh Magennis	Northern Ireland

1 goal

Czech Republic
- Ondřej Čelůstka
- Jan Chramosta
- Marcel Gecov
- Tomáš Hořava
- Jan Kovařík
- Libor Kozák
- Lukáš Mareček
- Jiří Valenta
- Martin Zeman

Germany
- Holger Badstuber
- Philipp Bargfrede
- Jérôme Boateng
- Timo Gebhart
- Kevin Großkreutz
- Benedikt Höwedes
- Jan Kirchhoff
- Thomas Müller
- Deniz Naki
- Sidney Sam
- André Schürrle
- Daniel Schwaab
- Richard Sukuta-Pasu

Iceland
- Birkir Bjarnason
- Hólmar Örn Eyjólfsson
- Aron Gunnarsson
- Josef Kristinn Josefsson
- Almarr Ormarsson
- Kristinn Steindórsson

Northern Ireland
- Ryan McGivern
- Kirk Millar
