= Ivan Goranov =

Bulgarian footballer (born 1992)

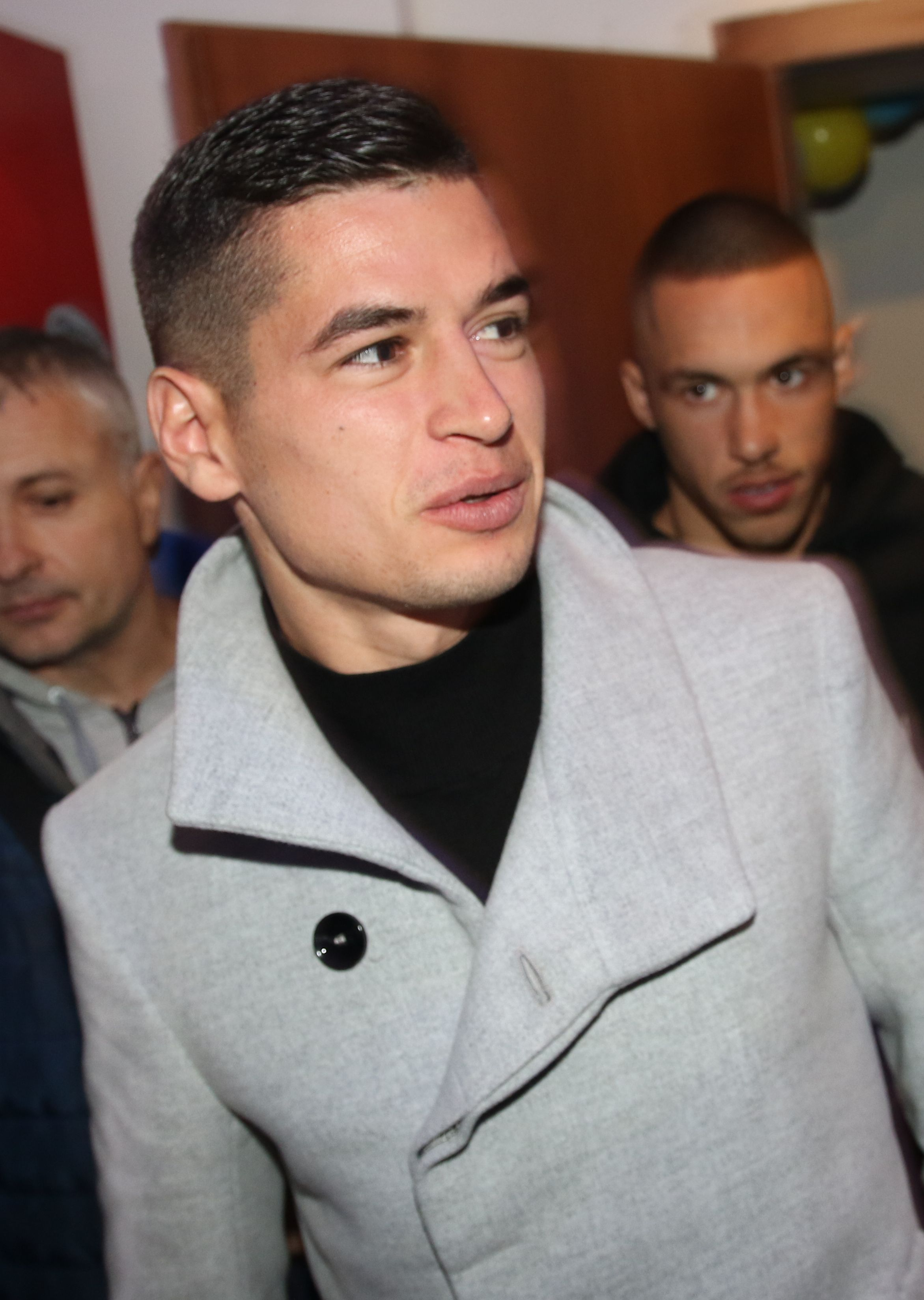
- Goranov in 2018

Personal information
- Full name: Ivan Pavlov Goranov
- Date of birth: 10 June 1992 (age 34)
- Place of birth: Velingrad, Bulgaria
- Height: 1.78 m (5 ft 10 in)
- Position: Left-back

Team information
- Current team: Botev Vratsa
- Number: 4

Youth career
- 2000–2005: Chepinets Velingrad
- 2005–2006: CSKA Sofia
- 2006–2010: Levski Sofia

Senior career*
Years	Team	Apps	(Gls)
2010–2011	Levski Sofia	2	(0)
2011–2013	Beroe	35	(0)
2014–2016	Litex Lovech	29	(0)
2015–2016	Litex Lovech II	13	(2)
2016–2017	Lokomotiv Plovdiv	29	(0)
2017–2020	Levski Sofia	85	(4)
2020–2022	Charleroi	2	(0)
2021–2022	→ Levski Sofia (loan)	20	(0)
2022–2023	Lamia	17	(0)
2023	Universitatea Cluj	8	(0)
2023–2024	Ionikos	24	(0)
2024–2025	Chania	19	(0)
2025–	Botev Vratsa	25	(0)

International career^{‡}
2013–2014	Bulgaria U21	9	(0)
2018–2020	Bulgaria	7	(0)
- * Club domestic league appearances and goals as of 11 June 2026 ‡ National team caps and goals as of 20 May 2022

Ivan Pavlov Goranov (Bulgarian: Иван Павлов Горанов; born 10 June 1992) is a Bulgarian professional footballer who plays as a left-back for Botev Vratsa.

== Club career ==
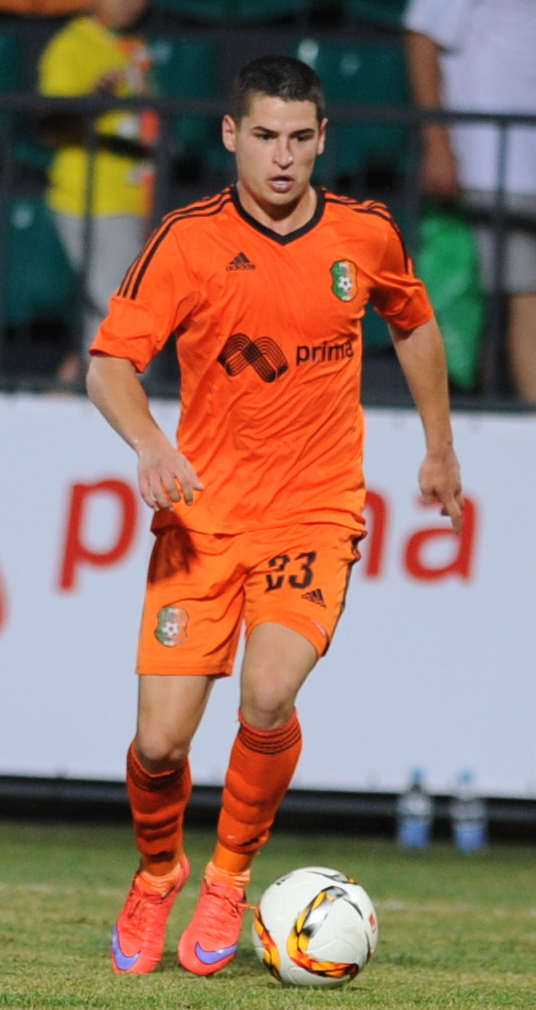
Ivan Goranov with Litex Lovech in 2015

Born in Velingrad, Goranov started his career at Chepinets, but joined Levski Sofia when he was 15 years old. He made his A PFG debut against Vidima-Rakovski, as a 64th-minute substitute in a 2–0 Levski home victory on 2 April 2011.

On 8 June 2011, Beroe Stara Zagora accepted a bid for winger Todor Hristov from Levski, the deal was reported to be worth €100,000, including the transfer of Goranov to Beroe.

On 20 June 2016, Goranov signed with Lokomotiv Plovdiv. On 9 June 2017, the Bulgarian Football Union announced that his contract had been terminated due to the club's fault. Four days later, he was signed by Levski Sofia for three years.

On 13 February 2023, Goranov signed a contract with Romanian first division club Universitatea Cluj.

== International career ==
Goranov received his first call-up for senior Bulgarian squad on 29 August 2018 for the UEFA Nations League matches against Slovenia and Norway on 6 and 9 September. He made his debut against the former, coming on as a late substitute for Todor Nedelev.

== Career statistics ==
As of match played 6 September 2020

Bulgaria national team
Year	Apps	Goals
2018	2	0
2019	3	0
2020	2	0
Total	7	0

== Honours ==
Beroe

- Bulgarian Cup: 2012–13
- Bulgarian Supercup: 2013

Levski Sofia

- Bulgarian Cup: 2021–22

Universitatea Cluj

- Cupa României runner-up: 2022–23
