= Giannis Kargas =

Greek footballer

Personal information
- Full name: Ioannis Kargas
- Date of birth: 9 December 1994 (age 31)
- Place of birth: Kilkis, Greece
- Height: 1.88 m (6 ft 2 in)
- Position: Centre-back

Team information
- Current team: Volos
- Number: 4

Senior career*
Years	Team	Apps	(Gls)
2011–2013	Kavala	19	(1)
2013–2014	Fostiras	6	(2)
2014–2015	Panachaiki	42	(1)
2016–2017	Platanias	20	(2)
2017	Panionios	4	(0)
2018	Dinamo Brest	18	(0)
2019	PAS Giannina	8	(0)
2019–2020	Levski Sofia	21	(0)
2020–2022	PAS Giannina	58	(4)
2022–2023	PAOK	8	(0)
2023–2025	Anorthosis	38	(0)
2025–	Volos	31	(2)
- * Club domestic league appearances and goals as of 13 October 2026

Giannis Kargas (Greek: Γιάννης Κάργας; born 9 December 1994) is a Greek professional footballer who plays as a centre-back for Super League club Volos.

== Career ==
=== Early career ===
The 1.88-meter-tall (6.2 ft) defender started his career in the academies of Kavala and in 2011 he signed a professional contract with the people of Kavala. He played 20 times with the club's jersey and then followed his transfer to Fostiras in 2013 where he stayed for only 6 months. In January 2014, he moved to Patra on behalf of Panachaiki, where he remained for 2 years (48 appearances, 1 goal and 2 assists), to move to Platanias in January 2016 Kargas showed that he was perfectly suited to the top level of Greek football and in 18 months he wore the shirt of the Cretan team 26 times, even scoring two goals. In the summer of 2017 he was acquired as a free agent by Panionios. He stayed in Nea Smyrni for only 6 months, as in February 2018 a proposal came from the Belarusian Dinamo Brest. He remained in Belarus for a year, competing 26 times won the Cup and the Super Cup of the country and in the winter of 2019 he returned to his homeland and PAS Giannina, he played in 11 games and in the summer he left to move out of Greece again six months later, on behalf of Levski Sofia with which he counted 29 appearances in the 2019-20 season. One year later, he was released by Levski Sofia and subsequently returned to PAS Giannina.

=== PAS Giannina ===
Kargas comes from a "full" and season with the jersey of the team of Epirus, as he played in a total of 36 games, scoring 3 goals. He was, after all, one of the top in his position in the Greek championship last season. He also won a place in the top 11, as formed by CIES, the international center for sports research. He had a good season in 2020-2021, being even then a key and player in PAS, counting 29 participations in all domestic competitions and scoring 3 goals again. With the shirt of PAS, he has a total of 73 matches and six goals. After the last season that he had, PAOK decided to trust him for their defense.

=== PAOK ===
Giannis Kargas is expected to continue his career with "Dikefalos tou Vorra" coming to an agreement with PAS Giannina. A player of PAOK should be considered, Giannis Kargas. The "black and whites" came to an agreement with both the player and PAS Giannina, in a transfer which will cost 300,000 euros.

=== Anorthosis Famagusta ===
On 28 June 2023, it was officially announced that Kargas had signed with Anorthosis Famagusta on a free transfer from PAOK.

== Career statistics ==
As of match played 7 April 2025

Club	Season	League			Cup		Continental		Other		Total	
Club	Season	Division	Apps	Goals	Apps	Goals	Apps	Goals	Apps	Goals	Apps	Goals
Kavala	2012–13	Football League	19	1	1	0	—		—		20	1
Fostiras	2013–14	Football League	6	2	3	0	—		—		9	2
Panachaiki	2013–14	Football League	3	0	—		—		—		3	0
Panachaiki	2014–15	Football League	27	0	4	0	—		—		31	0
Panachaiki	2015–16	Football League	12	1	2	0	—		—		14	1
Panachaiki	Total		42	1	6	0	—		—		48	1
Platanias	2016–17	Super League Greece	20	2	6	0	—		—		26	2
Panionios	2017–18	Super League Greece	4	0	3	0	—		—		7	0
Dinamo Brest	2018	Premier League	18	0	4	0	3 (Note: Appearances in UEFA Europa League.)	0	1 (Note: Appearances in Belarusian Super Cup.)	0	26	0
PAS Giannina	2018–19	Super League Greece	8	0	—		—		—		8	0
Levski Sofia	2019–20	First League	21	0	5	0	3	0	—		29	0
PAS Giannina	2020–21	Super League Greece	23	2	6	1	—		—		29	3
PAS Giannina	2021–22	Super League Greece	35	2	1	1	—		—		36	3
PAS Giannina	Total		58	4	7	2	—		—		65	6
PAOK	2022–23	Super League Greece	8	0	3	0	2	0	—		13	0
Anorthosis	2023–24	Cypriot First Division	20	0	1	0	—		—		21	0
Anorthosis	2024–25	Cypriot First Division	18	0	2	0	—		—		20	0
Anorthosis	Total		38	0	3	0	—		—		41	0
Volos	2025–26	Superleague Greece	24	0	3	0	—		—		27	0
Career total			266	10	44	2	8	0	1	0	319	12

== Honours ==
=== Club ===
Dynamo Brest

- Belarusian Cup: 2017–18
- Belarusian Super Cup: 2018

=== Individual ===
- Super League Greece Team of the Season: 2021–22
