= 2021–22 First Professional Football League (Bulgaria) =

98th season of top-tier football league in Bulgaria

First Professional Football League
- Season: 2021–22
- Dates: 24 July 2021 – 30 May 2022
- Champions: Ludogorets Razgrad (11th title)
- Relegated: Tsarsko Selo
- Champions League: Ludogorets Razgrad
- Europa Conference League: Botev Plovdiv; CSKA Sofia; Levski Sofia
- Matches: 221
- Goals: 540 (2.44 per match)
- Top goalscorer: Pieros Sotiriou (17 goals)
- Best goalkeeper: Nikolay Mihaylov (15 clean sheets)
- Biggest home win: Ludogorets 5–0 Lokomotiv Sofia (20 August 2021); Cherno More 5–0 Botev Vratsa (4 April 2022); Ludogorets 5–0 CSKA Sofia (30 April 2022)
- Biggest away win: Arda 0–4 Ludogorets (13 February 2022); Botev Vratsa 0–4 CSKA 1948 (19 February 2022)
- Highest scoring: Arda 3–6 CSKA 1948 (22 April 2022)
- Longest winning run: 7 games Ludogorets
- Longest unbeaten run: 12 games CSKA Sofia
- Longest winless run: 14 games Botev Vratsa
- Longest losing run: 6 games Tsarsko Selo; Botev Vratsa
- Highest attendance: 19,000; Levski Sofia 0–0 CSKA Sofia (6 March 2022)
- Lowest attendance: 110; Tsarsko Selo 1–1 Ludogorets (19 March 2022)
- All statistics correct as of 20:30, 22 May 2022 (UTC).

The 2021–22 First Professional Football League, also known as efbet League for sponsorship reasons, was the 98th season of the top division of the Bulgarian football league system, the 74th since a league format was adopted for the national competition of A Group as a top tier of the pyramid, and also the 6th season of the First Professional Football League, which decides the Bulgarian champion. Ludogorets Razgrad were the defending champions for the 10th consecutive time. They clinched their 11th title with four games to spare on 17 April 2022, following a 4–1 home win over Slavia Sofia.

== Summary ==
This was the last season featuring 14 teams; from next season, the league will expand from 14 to 16 teams, with the 14th placed team from this season being automatically relegated to the Second League, while the first three-placed teams were automatically promoted from the Second League and the 13th placed team from the First League qualified for the relegation play-off, facing the 4th placed team from the second league.

== Teams ==
Fourteen teams competed in the league – the top eleven teams from the previous season, the top two teams from the Second League, and the winner of the promotion/relegation play-off between the third-placed team from the 2020–21 Second League and the 12th placed team from the 2020–21 First League.

The first team to earn promotion was Pirin Blagoevgrad, who were promoted after winning 2–0 against Litex Lovech on 23 April 2021. Pirin returned to the top tier after a 3-year absence, having last competed in the highest level during the 2017–18 season. The second team to earn promotion was Lokomotiv Sofia, who were promoted after winning 4–1 against Septemvri Simitli on 13 May 2021. Lokomotiv returned to the top tier after a 6-year absence, having last competed in the highest level during the 2014–15 season.

Botev Vratsa won the promotion/relegation play-off 1–0 against Septemvri Sofia on 28 May 2021, thus remaining in the First League.

=== Stadia and locations ===
Arda	Beroe	Botev Plovdiv	Botev Vratsa
Arena Arda	Beroe	Futbolen kompleks Botev 1912	Hristo Botev
Capacity: 11,114	Capacity: 12,128	Capacity: 4,000	Capacity: 12,000
Cherno More	2021–22 First Professional Football League (Bulgaria) (Bulgaria) Location of Sofia teams.		CSKA Sofia
Ticha	2021–22 First Professional Football League (Bulgaria) (Bulgaria) Location of Sofia teams.		Balgarska Armia
Capacity: 8,250	2021–22 First Professional Football League (Bulgaria) (Bulgaria) Location of Sofia teams.		Capacity: 22,995
CSKA 1948	2021–22 First Professional Football League (Bulgaria) (Bulgaria) Location of Sofia teams.		Levski Sofia
Bistritsa	2021–22 First Professional Football League (Bulgaria) (Bulgaria) Location of Sofia teams.		Vivacom Arena - Georgi Asparuhov
Capacity: 2,500	2021–22 First Professional Football League (Bulgaria) (Bulgaria) Location of Sofia teams.		Capacity: 25,000
Lokomotiv Plovdiv	2021–22 First Professional Football League (Bulgaria) (Bulgaria) Location of Sofia teams.		Lokomotiv Sofia
Lokomotiv	2021–22 First Professional Football League (Bulgaria) (Bulgaria) Location of Sofia teams.		Lokomotiv
Capacity: 13,220	2021–22 First Professional Football League (Bulgaria) (Bulgaria) Location of Sofia teams.		Capacity: 22,000
Ludogorets	Pirin Blagoevgrad	Slavia Sofia	Tsarsko Selo
Huvepharma Arena	Hristo Botev	Aleksandar Shalamanov	Arena Tsarsko Selo
Capacity: 10,422	Capacity: 7,500	Capacity: 25,556	Capacity: 1,550

=== Personnel and kits ===
Note: Flags indicate national team as has been defined under FIFA eligibility rules. Players and managers may hold more than one non-FIFA nationality.

Team	Manager	Captain	Kit manufacturer	Shirt sponsor	Additional
Arda	(Bulgaria) Stamen Belchev	(Bulgaria) Ivan Kokonov	Nike	efbet	—
Beroe	(Bulgaria) Petar Hubchev	(Bulgaria) Georgi Dinkov	Uhlsport	efbet	Refan, Ajax Group
Botev Plovdiv	(Bosnia and Herzegovina) Azrudin Valentić	(Bulgaria) Todor Nedelev	Uhlsport	WinBet	—
Botev Vratsa	(Italy) Gennaro Iezzo	(Bulgaria) Krasimir Kostov	Erreà	WinBet	Kozloduy NPP
Cherno More	(Bulgaria) Ilian Iliev	(Bulgaria) Daniel Dimov	Uhlsport	Armeets	—
CSKA 1948	(Bulgaria) Nikolay Kirov	(Bulgaria) Daniel Naumov	Adidas	efbet	Bachkovo
CSKA Sofia	(England) Alan Pardew	(Netherlands) Jurgen Mattheij	Adidas	WinBet	A1, Baristo
Levski Sofia	(Bulgaria) Stanimir Stoilov	(Bulgaria) Nikolay Mihaylov	Joma	Levski e Vechen (Note: Levski e Vechen (transl. "Levski is Eternal") is the slogan for the latest donations campaign for the club.)	PalmsBet
Lokomotiv Plovdiv	(Bulgaria) Aleksandar Tomash	(Bulgaria) Dimitar Iliev	Nike	WinBet	General Broker, Money+
Lokomotiv Sofia	(Bulgaria) Ivan Kolev	(Bulgaria) Krasimir Miloshev	Joma	Betano	Casa Boyana, Malizia, Intesa, VIA 2000, Club 33
Ludogorets	(Slovenia) Ante Šimundža	(Bulgaria) Anton Nedyalkov	Nike	efbet	Vivacom
Pirin Blagoevgrad	(Bulgaria) Radoslav Mitrevski	(Bulgaria) Nikolay Bodurov	Adidas	8888.bg	Belogour Properties, AMFEX
Slavia Sofia	(Bulgaria) Zlatomir Zagorčić	(Bulgaria) Georgi Petkov	Uhlsport	bet365	Asset Insurance
Tsarsko Selo	(Italy) Stefano Maccoppi	(Bulgaria) Martin Kavdanski	Nike	WinBet	—

Note: Individual clubs may wear jerseys with advertising. However, only one sponsorship is permitted per jersey for official tournaments organised by UEFA in addition to that of the kit manufacturer (exceptions are made for non-profit organisations). Clubs in the domestic league can have more than one sponsorship per jersey which can feature on the front of the shirt, incorporated with the main sponsor or in place of it; or on the back, either below the squad number or on the collar area. Shorts also have space available for advertisement.

=== Managerial changes ===
Team	Outgoing manager	Manner of departure	Date of vacancy	Position in table	Incoming manager	Date of appointment
Botev Vratsa	(Bulgaria) Veselin Velikov	Resigned	8 June 2021	Pre-season	(Brazil) Daniel Morales	9 June 2021
CSKA Sofia	(Bulgaria) Lyuboslav Penev	Resigned	25 July 2021	1st	(Bulgaria) Stoycho Mladenov	26 July 2021
CSKA 1948	(Bulgaria) Todor Kiselichkov	Mutual consent	26 July 2021	14th	(Bulgaria) Miroslav Mindev	27 July 2021
Levski Sofia	(Bulgaria) Zhivko Milanov	Resigned	20 August 2021	12th	(Bulgaria) Todor Simov (interim)	23 August 2021
CSKA 1948	(Bulgaria) Miroslav Mindev	Mutual consent	30 August 2021	14th	(Bulgaria) Nikolay Kirov	3 September 2021
Arda	(Bulgaria) Nikolay Kirov	Mutual consent	2 September 2021	11th	(Bulgaria) Dimitar Dimitrov	6 September 2021
Levski Sofia	(Bulgaria) Todor Simov (interim)	End of interim period	2 September 2021	12th	(Bulgaria) Stanimir Stoilov	2 September 2021
Arda	(Bulgaria) Dimitar Dimitrov	Mutual consent	8 September 2021	11th	(Bulgaria) Georgi Chilikov	8 September 2021
Ludogorets	(Lithuania) Valdas Dambrauskas	Sacked	3 October 2021	3rd	(Bulgaria) Stanislav Genchev (interim)	3 October 2021
Tsarsko Selo	(Bulgaria) Antoni Zdravkov	Mutual consent	8 October 2021	13th	(Bulgaria) Lyuboslav Penev	13 October 2021
Arda	(Bulgaria) Georgi Chilikov	Mutual consent	9 November 2021	7th	(Serbia) Slavko Matić	12 November 2021
Pirin Blagoevgrad	(Northern Ireland) Warren Feeney	Mutual consent	3 December 2021	13th	(Bulgaria) Radoslav Mitrevski	3 December 2021
Arda	(Serbia) Slavko Matić	Sacked	16 December 2021	9th	(Bulgaria) Stamen Belchev	23 December 2021
Ludogorets	(Bulgaria) Stanislav Genchev (interim)	End of interim period	3 January 2022	1st	(Slovenia) Ante Šimundža	3 January 2022
Tsarsko Selo	(Bulgaria) Lyuboslav Penev	Mutual consent	8 January 2022	14th	(Italy) Andrea Sassarini	28 January 2022
Beroe	(Bulgaria) Petar Kolev	Mutual consent	19 January 2022	7th	(Bulgaria) Petar Hubchev	19 January 2022
Tsarsko Selo	(Italy) Andrea Sassarini	Sacked	5 March 2022	14th	(Italy) Stefano Maccoppi	6 March 2022
Botev Vratsa	(Brazil) Daniel Morales	Mutual consent	22 March 2022	13th	(Bulgaria) Ivaylo Dimitrov	23 March 2022
Lokomotiv Plovdiv	(Bulgaria) Aleksandar Tunchev	Resigned	7 April 2022	8th	(Bulgaria) Aleksandar Tomash	11 April 2022
CSKA Sofia	(Bulgaria) Stoycho Mladenov	Resigned	14 April 2022	2nd	(England) Alan Pardew	14 April 2022
Botev Vratsa	(Bulgaria) Ivaylo Dimitrov	Mutual consent	26 April 2022	13th	(Italy) Gennaro Iezzo	27 April 2022

== Regular season ==
=== League table ===
Pos	Team	Pld	W	D	L	GF	GA	GD	Pts	Qualification
1	Ludogorets Razgrad	26	21	1	4	64	23	+41	64	Qualification for the Championship group
2	CSKA Sofia	26	15	7	4	39	25	+14	52	Qualification for the Championship group
3	Botev Plovdiv	26	13	7	6	34	28	+6	46	Qualification for the Championship group
4	Cherno More	26	12	9	5	35	18	+17	45	Qualification for the Championship group
5	Levski Sofia	26	12	6	8	33	25	+8	42	Qualification for the Championship group
6	Slavia Sofia	26	9	9	8	30	26	+4	36	Qualification for the Championship group
7	Lokomotiv Plovdiv	26	9	7	10	30	35	−5	34	Qualification for the Europa Conference League group
8	Beroe	26	9	5	12	23	27	−4	32	Qualification for the Europa Conference League group
9	CSKA 1948	26	8	6	12	36	37	−1	30	Qualification for the Europa Conference League group
10	Arda	26	7	8	11	27	34	−7	29	Qualification for the Europa Conference League group
11	Pirin Blagoevgrad	26	7	6	13	34	41	−7	27	Qualification for the Relegation group
12	Lokomotiv Sofia	26	6	7	13	22	42	−20	25	Qualification for the Relegation group
13	Botev Vratsa	26	5	7	14	23	48	−25	22	Qualification for the Relegation group
14	Tsarsko Selo	26	3	7	16	15	36	−21	16	Qualification for the Relegation group

Source: soccerway, Bulgarian Football
Rules for classification: 1) Points; 2) Head-to-head points; 3) Head-to-head goal difference; 4) Head-to-head goals scored; 5) Head-to-head away goals scored (only if two teams); 6) Goal difference; 7) Goals scored; 8) Fairplay ranking; 9) Draw.

=== Results ===
Home \ Away	ARD	BSZ	BPD	BVR	CHM	CSK	CSS	LEV	LPD	LSO	LUD	PIR	SLA	TSS
Arda	—	1–0	0–2	3–2	0–3	0–0	2–2	0–0	5–1	1–1	0–4	3–0	1–1	2–0
Beroe	1–1	—	1–1	1–0	0–2	1–0	0–0	1–1	1–0	1–0	0–1	1–1	2–1	1–0
Botev Plovdiv	2–1	2–1	—	2–1	0–2	3–1	2–0	3–1	2–1	2–0	1–3	2–1	1–0	2–1
Botev Vratsa	0–0	1–0	1–1	—	0–0	0–4	2–4	2–0	0–0	2–2	1–2	0–3	2–1	0–0
Cherno More	2–0	1–0	2–0	5–0	—	2–0	0–1	1–0	0–0	1–1	1–2	1–1	1–1	1–1
CSKA 1948	2–3	1–0	2–2	5–1	2–3	—	2–4	0–2	4–0	1–1	2–0	1–0	1–1	1–0
CSKA Sofia	2–1	1–0	3–2	4–0	2–0	1–0	—	2–1	1–3	2–0	1–0	1–0	1–1	0–0
Levski Sofia	0–2	2–1	2–0	0–0	2–0	0–0	0–0	—	2–1	1–0	2–4	3–0	1–2	3–1
Lokomotiv Plovdiv	0–0	2–0	1–1	2–4	1–1	2–1	2–0	2–2	—	2–1	1–3	2–1	0–1	1–0
Lokomotiv Sofia	2–0	0–3	0–0	1–0	0–3	2–2	1–1	1–2	1–0	—	2–4	2–1	1–0	2–1
Ludogorets Razgrad	4–1	2–0	3–0	3–1	2–0	3–0	2–0	2–1	1–0	5–0	—	3–5	3–1	4–0
Pirin Blagoevgrad	1–0	2–3	0–1	3–1	2–2	4–1	1–1	0–3	2–3	2–1	1–3	—	0–0	2–1
Slavia Sofia	1–0	3–2	0–0	1–0	0–1	2–1	2–3	0–1	1–1	3–0	1–0	1–1	—	0–0
Tsarsko Selo	1–0	1–2	0–0	1–2	0–0	0–2	1–2	0–1	0–2	2–0	1–1	1–0	2–5	—

Source: Bulgarian Football
Legend: Blue = home team win; Yellow = draw; Red = away team win.
For upcoming matches, an "a" indicates there is an article about the rivalry between the two participants.

=== Results by round ===
Team ╲ Round	1	2	3	4	5	6	7	8	9	10	11	12	13	14	15	16	17	18	19	20	21	22	23	24	25	26
Arda	D	D	W	L	L	D	L	W	D	L	D	D	W	W	L	D	L	W	L	L	L	W	L	W	L	D
Beroe	W	W	L	L	W	L	W	L	D	W	L	D	L	W	D	L	W	L	D	W	D	L	L	W	L	L
Botev Plovdiv	W	L	W	D	W	D	W	W	D	W	L	L	D	W	L	D	W	L	W	W	D	W	D	W	L	W
Botev Vratsa	D	W	W	D	L	D	L	L	L	D	L	D	L	L	D	D	L	W	W	L	L	L	L	L	L	W
Cherno More	D	W	W	D	W	L	L	D	D	W	D	D	W	D	W	W	D	W	L	L	W	D	W	W	W	L
CSKA 1948	L	L	D	L	L	L	W	D	W	L	W	L	L	L	W	D	W	L	D	W	L	W	D	L	W	D
CSKA Sofia	W	D	W	D	W	W	D	W	W	W	W	D	L	W	W	L	W	D	W	W	W	D	D	L	W	L
Levski Sofia	L	L	L	W	L	W	D	D	L	L	W	W	L	W	D	D	W	W	D	W	W	D	L	W	W	W
Lokomotiv Plovdiv	L	L	W	D	L	D	D	W	D	L	D	W	W	L	W	W	D	D	L	L	W	L	W	L	L	W
Lokomotiv Sofia	L	W	D	D	L	D	W	D	W	D	L	L	D	L	L	D	L	L	W	L	L	L	W	L	W	L
Ludogorets Razgrad	W	W	L	W	W	W	W	L	W	W	W	W	W	W	L	W	W	W	L	W	W	W	W	D	W	W
Pirin Blagoevgrad	L	L	L	W	L	L	L	L	D	D	W	L	W	L	D	L	L	D	W	W	W	D	D	W	L	L
Slavia Sofia	W	D	L	W	W	W	D	W	L	D	D	D	W	L	W	D	L	D	D	L	L	W	D	L	W	L
Tsarsko Selo	D	D	L	L	W	D	L	L	L	L	L	W	L	D	L	D	L	L	L	L	L	L	D	D	L	W

Source: Bulgarian Football
W = Win; D = Draw; L = Loss

== Championship round ==
=== Championship round table ===
Points and goals will carry over in full from regular season.

Pos	Team	Pld	W	D	L	GF	GA	GD	Pts	Qualification	LUD	CSS	BPD	LEV	CHM	SLA
1	Ludogorets Razgrad (C)	31	26	1	4	77	25	+52	79	Qualification for the Champions League first qualifying round	—	5–0	—	—	1–0	4–1
2	CSKA Sofia	31	16	10	5	42	31	+11	58	Qualification for the Europa Conference League second qualifying round	—	—	0–0	0–0	—	3–1
3	Botev Plovdiv (O)	31	15	8	8	38	33	+5	53	Qualification for the Europa Conference League play-off	1–2	—	—	—	1–0	2–1
4	Levski Sofia	31	15	7	9	38	27	+11	52	Qualification for the Europa Conference League second qualifying round (Note: Levski Sofia qualified for the Europa Conference League by winning the 2021–22 Bulgarian Cup.)	0–1	—	2–0	—	—	—
5	Cherno More	31	12	11	8	36	22	+14	47		—	0–0	—	0–1	—	—
6	Slavia Sofia	31	9	10	12	35	38	−3	37		—	—	—	1–2	1–1	—

Source: Soccerway, Bulgarian Football
Legend: Blue = home team win; Yellow = draw; Red = away team win.
Rules for classification: 1) Points; 2) Head-to-head points; 3) Head-to-head goal difference; 4) Head-to-head goals scored; 5) Head-to-head away goals scored (only if two teams); 6) Goal difference; 7) Goals scored; 8) Fairplay ranking; 9) Draw.
(C) Champions; (O) Play-off winners

== Europa Conference League round ==
Points and goals will carry over in full from regular season.

=== Europa Conference League round table ===
Pos	Team	Pld	W	D	L	GF	GA	GD	Pts	Qualification	BSZ	CSK	LPD	ARD
1	Beroe	32	11	8	13	30	33	−3	41 (Note: Head-to-head points: Beroe 7, CSKA 1948 4.)	Qualification for the Europa Conference League play-off	—	1–0	1–0	2–2
2	CSKA 1948	32	11	8	13	51	45	+6	41		2–2	—	1–0	5–1
3	Lokomotiv Plovdiv	32	9	11	12	36	43	−7	38		1–1	1–1	—	0–0
4	Arda	32	8	11	13	38	51	−13	35		1–0	3–6	4–4	—

Source: Soccerway, Bulgarian Football
Legend: Blue = home team win; Yellow = draw; Red = away team win.
Rules for classification: 1) Points; 2) Head-to-head points; 3) Head-to-head goal difference; 4) Head-to-head goals scored; 5) Head-to-head away goals scored (only if two teams); 6) Goal difference; 7) Goals scored; 8) Fairplay ranking; 9) Draw.

== Relegation round ==
Points and goals will carry over in full from regular season.

=== Relegation round table ===
Pos	Team	Pld	W	D	L	GF	GA	GD	Pts	Qualification or relegation	LSO	PIR	BVR	TSS
1	Lokomotiv Sofia	32	8	10	14	27	46	−19	34		—	1–0	1–0	0–0
2	Pirin Blagoevgrad	32	9	6	17	40	53	−13	33		2–1	—	3–5	0–2
3	Botev Vratsa (O)	32	6	10	16	30	55	−25	28	Qualification for the relegation play-off	1–1	0–1	—	0–0
4	Tsarsko Selo (R)	32	5	11	16	22	38	−16	26	Dissolved after the season	1–1	3–0	1–1	—

Source: Soccerway, Bulgarian Football
Legend: Blue = home team win; Yellow = draw; Red = away team win.
Rules for classification: 1) Points; 2) Head-to-head points; 3) Head-to-head goal difference; 4) Head-to-head goals scored; 5) Head-to-head away goals scored (only if two teams); 6) Goal difference; 7) Goals scored; 8) Fairplay ranking; 9) Draw.
(O) Play-off winners; (R) Relegated

== Europa Conference League play-off ==
28 May 2022
18:30 EEST

Botev Plovdiv	2–1	Beroe
Brahimi 38'; Konate 48'	Report	Mariani 53'

Futbolen kompleks Botev 1912, Plovdiv
Attendance: 3,500
Referee: Dragomir Draganov (Varna)

== Promotion/relegation play-off ==
27 May 2022
20:00 EEST

Botev Vratsa	3–2	Etar
Nenov 49'; Perea 74'; Baurenski 85'	Report	Knežević 89'; Ivanov 90+1'

Aleksandar Shalamanov, Sofia
Attendance: 1,200
Referee: Volen Chinkov (Sofia)

== Season statistics ==
=== Top scorers ===
As of 22 May 2022

Rank	Player	Club	Goals
1	(Cyprus) Pieros Sotiriou	Ludogorets	17
2	(Ecuador) Jordy Caicedo	CSKA Sofia	16
3	(Bulgaria) Ivaylo Chochev	CSKA 1948	13
3	(Bulgaria) Dimitar Iliev	Lokomotiv Plovdiv	13
5	(Ukraine) Yevheniy Serdyuk	Cherno More	12
6	(North Macedonia) Dorian Babunski	Botev Vratsa	10
6	(Ghana) Bernard Tekpetey	Ludogorets	10
8	(Bulgaria) Georgi Minchev	Lokomotiv Plovdiv	9
8	(Brazil) Octávio	Lokomotiv Sofia	9
8	(Bulgaria) Galin Ivanov	CSKA 1948	9
8	(Bulgaria) Tonislav Yordanov	Arda	9
8	(Bulgaria) Aleksandar Kolev	CSKA 1948	9

=== Clean sheets ===
As of 22 May 2022

Rank	Goalkeeper	Club	Clean sheets
1	(Bulgaria) Nikolay Mihaylov	Levski Sofia	15
2	(Bulgaria) Ivan Dyulgerov	Cherno More	12
3	(Bulgaria) Yanko Georgiev	Pirin Blagoevgrad (Note: Includes 7 clean sheets for Tsarsko Selo)	10
4	(Brazil) Gustavo Busatto	CSKA Sofia	9
4	(Bulgaria) Svetoslav Vutsov	Slavia Sofia	9
4	(Bulgaria) Daniel Naumov	CSKA 1948	9
7	(Bulgaria) Georgi Argilashki	Botev Plovdiv	8
7	(Netherlands) Sergio Padt	Ludogorets	8
7	(Bulgaria) Krasimir Kostov	Botev Vratsa	8
7	(Bulgaria) Aleksandar Lyubenov	Lokomotiv Sofia	8

=== Hat-tricks ===
Player	For	Against	Result	Date
(Bulgaria) Georgi Minchev	Lokomotiv Plovdiv	CSKA Sofia	3–1 (A)	31 October 2021
(Bulgaria) Georgi Minchev	Lokomotiv Plovdiv	Pirin Blagoevgrad	3–2 (A)	27 November 2021
(Bulgaria) Galin Ivanov	CSKA 1948	Arda	6–3 (A)	22 April 2022
(Bulgaria) Aleksandar Kolev	CSKA 1948	Arda	5–1 (H)	13 May 2022
(Bulgaria) Yuliyan Nenov	Botev Vratsa	Pirin Blagoevgrad	5–3 (A)	21 May 2022

=== Goal of the week ===
Week	Player	Club	Goal
1	(Bulgaria) Dimitar Iliev	Lokomotiv Plovdiv	v. Ludogorets
2	(Ghana) Bernard Tekpetey	Ludogorets	v. CSKA 1948
3	(Bulgaria) Spas Delev	Arda	v. Levski Sofia
4	(Bulgaria) Krasimir Stanoev	Pirin Blagoevgrad	v. CSKA 1948
5	(Portugal) Josué Sá	Ludogorets	v. Lokomotiv Sofia
6	(Bulgaria) Borislav Tsonev	Levski Sofia	v. Beroe
7	(Bulgaria) Georgi Milanov	Levski Sofia	v. Lokomotiv Plovdiv
8	(Bulgaria) Valentin Nikolov	Lokomotiv Sofia	v. Cherno More
9	(Bulgaria) Georgi Milanov	Levski Sofia	v. CSKA Sofia
10	No winner		
11	(Morocco) Bilal Bari	Levski Sofia	v. Lokomotiv Sofia
12	(Brazil) Alex Santana	Ludogorets	v. Botev Plovdiv
13	(Bulgaria) Spas Delev	Arda	v. CSKA 1948
14	(Netherlands) Jurgen Mattheij	CSKA Sofia	v. CSKA 1948
15	(Spain) Pablo Álvarez	Cherno More	v. Botev Plovdiv
16	(Portugal) Leandro Andrade	Cherno More	v. Beroe
17	(Ghana) Emmanuel Toku	Botev Plovdiv	v. Botev Vratsa
18	(Brazil) Octávio	Lokomotiv Sofia	v. Ludogorets
19	(Bulgaria) Yuliyan Nenov	Botev Vratsa	v. Lokomotiv Plovdiv
20	(Bulgaria) Filip Krastev	Levski Sofia	v. Lokomotiv Plovdiv
21	(Bulgaria) Radoslav Kirilov	Slavia Sofia	v. Ludogorets
22	(Sweden) Jack Lahne	Botev Plovdiv	v. Lokomotiv Plovdiv
23	(Martinique) Mathias Coureur	Cherno More	v. Arda
24	(Bulgaria) Todor Nedelev	Botev Plovdiv	v. CSKA Sofia
25	(Brazil) Welton Felipe	Levski Sofia	v. Pirin Blagoevgrad
26	(Bulgaria) Viktor Vasilev	Botev Vratsa	v. Slavia Sofia
27	(Ghana) Bernard Tekpetey	Ludogorets	v. Slavia Sofia
28	(Colombia) Brayan Perea	Botev Vratsa	v. Tsarsko Selo
29	(The Gambia) Noah Sonko Sundberg	Levski Sofia	v. Botev Plovdiv
30	(Brazil) Wenderson Tsunami	Levski Sofia	v. Cherno More
31	(Bulgaria) Filip Krastev	Levski Sofia	v. Slavia Sofia
32	(Sweden) Jack Lahne	Botev Plovdiv	v. Slavia Sofia

Note: The top 3 goals of the week are selected for voting and the winner will be placed here.

=== Save of the week ===
Week	Goalkeeper	Club	Save
1	(Bulgaria) Georgi Georgiev	Cherno More	v. Tsarsko Selo
2	(Bulgaria) Aleksandar Lyubenov	Lokomotiv Sofia	v. Lokomotiv Plovdiv
3	(Bulgaria) Aleksandar Lyubenov	Lokomotiv Sofia	v. CSKA 1948
4	(Bulgaria) Ilko Pirgov	Lokomotiv Plovdiv	v. Cherno More
5	(Bulgaria) Yanko Georgiev	Tsarsko Selo	v. Arda
6	No winner		
7	(Brazil) Gustavo Busatto (Bulgaria) Svetoslav Vutsov	CSKA Sofia; Slavia Sofia	v. Slavia Sofia v. CSKA Sofia
8	(Bulgaria) Daniel Naumov	CSKA 1948	v. Levski Sofia
9	(Bulgaria) Svetoslav Vutsov	Slavia Sofia	v. Lokomotiv Sofia
10	(Croatia) Kristijan Kahlina	Ludogorets	v. Levski Sofia
11	No winner		
12	(Croatia) Kristijan Kahlina	Ludogorets	v. Botev Plovdiv
13	(Bulgaria) Ivan Dyulgerov	Cherno More	v. Levski Sofia
14	(Bulgaria) Georgi Argilashki	Botev Plovdiv	v. Pirin Blagoevgrad
15	(Bulgaria) Krasimir Kostov	Botev Vratsa	v. Levski Sofia
16	(Ukraine) Hennadiy Hanyev	Beroe	v. Cherno More
17	(Bulgaria) Krasimir Kostov (Bulgaria) Ivan Dyulgerov	Botev Vratsa; Cherno More	v. Botev Plovdiv v. Lokomotiv Plovdiv
18	(Bulgaria) Krasimir Kostov	Botev Vratsa	v. Beroe
19	(Bulgaria) Nikolay Mihaylov	Levski Sofia	v. Beroe
20	(Bulgaria) Yanko Georgiev	Pirin Blagoevgrad	v. Lokomotiv Sofia
21	(Bulgaria) Ivan Dyulgerov	Cherno More	v. Lokomotiv Sofia
22	(Ukraine) Hennadiy Hanyev (Bulgaria) Nikolay Mihaylov	Beroe; Levski Sofia	v. Arda v. CSKA Sofia
23	(Netherlands) Sergio Padt	Ludogorets	v. Levski Sofia
24	(Bulgaria) Krasimir Kostov	Botev Vratsa	v. Pirin Blagoevgrad
25	(Bulgaria) Ivan Dyulgerov	Cherno More	v. Botev Vratsa
26	(Bulgaria) Martin Lukov	Arda	v. CSKA 1948
27	(Bulgaria) Daniel Naumov	CSKA 1948	v. Beroe
28	(Bulgaria) Yanko Georgiev	Pirin Blagoevgrad	v. Lokomotiv Sofia
29	(Ukraine) Hennadiy Hanyev	Beroe	v. CSKA 1948
30	(Bulgaria) Nikolay Mihaylov	Levski Sofia	v. Slavia Sofia

Note: The top 3 goalkeeper saves of the week are selected for voting by Yordan Gospodinov and the winner will be placed here.
