= 2009 Bulgarian Cup final =

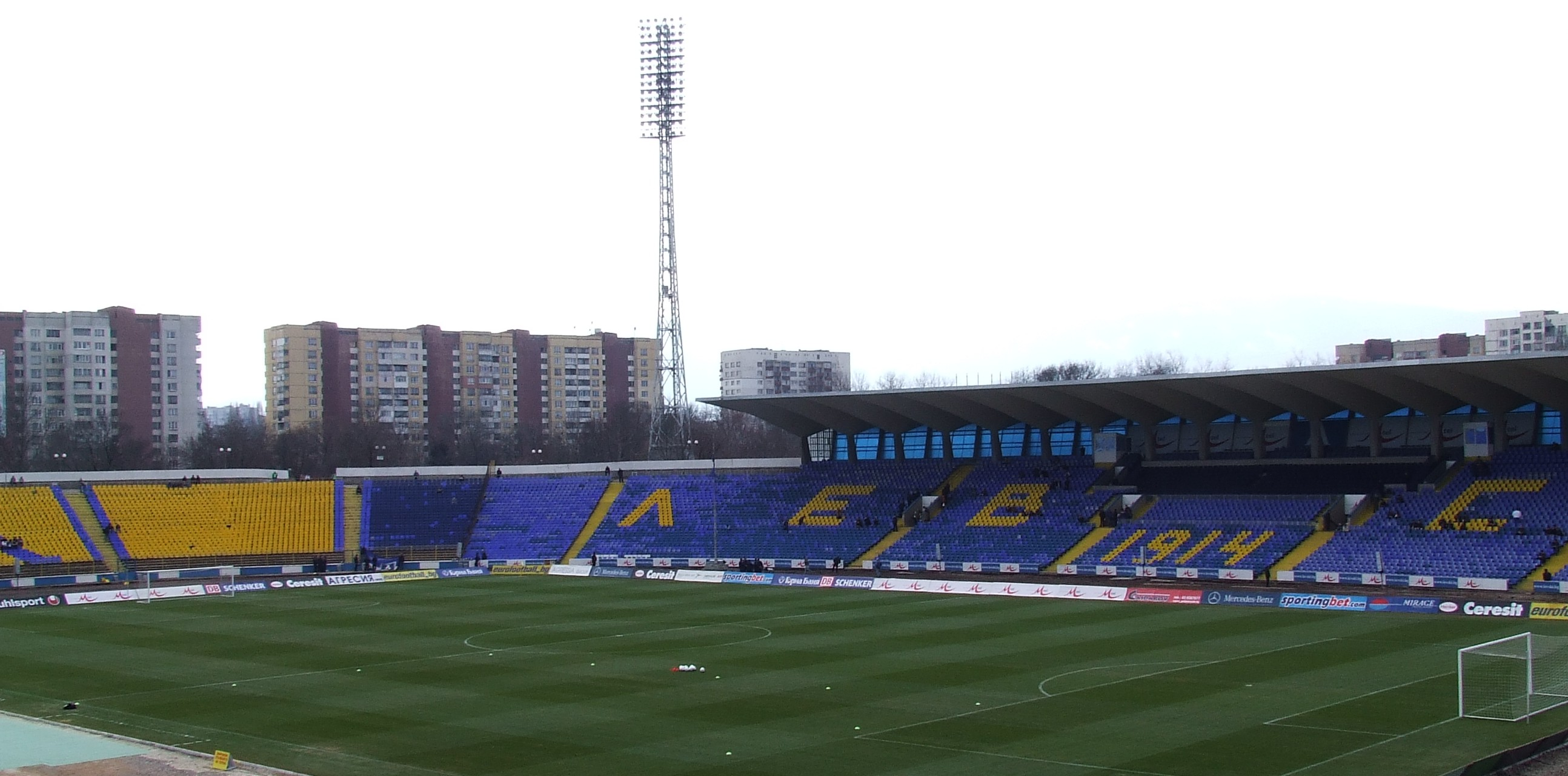
- Event: 2008–09 Bulgarian Cup
Pirin Blagoevgrad	Litex Lovech
0	3
- Date: 26 May 2009
- Venue: Georgi Asparuhov, Sofia
- Man of the Match: Doka Madureira
- Referee: Stefan Spasov
- Attendance: 9,500

The 2009 Bulgarian Cup final was the 69th final of the Bulgarian Cup. The final was played at the Georgi Asparuhov Stadium in Sofia on 26 May 2009, and marked the first time that the final has been staged at this stadium.

The match was contested by Litex Lovech, who beat Minyor Pernik 1–0 in their semi-final, and Pirin Blagoevgrad who beat Levski Sofia 1–0. The match was Litex's seventh Bulgarian Cup final, and Pirin's fourth.

Litex Lovech won the final 3–0, with goals from Wilfried Niflore, Doka Madureira and Krum Bibishkov, claiming their fourth Bulgarian Cup.

== Match ==
=== Details ===
26 May 2009
20:30

Pirin Blagoevgrad (1931)	0–3	Litex Lovech
		Niflore 20'; Doka 72'; Bibishkov 86'

Georgi Asparuhov, Sofia
Attendance: 9,500
Referee: Stefan Spasov (Pernik)

Pirin	Litex Lovech

Pirin:
GK	12	(Bulgaria) Blagoy Makendzhiev
DF	25	(Bulgaria) Miroslav Rizov
DF	3	(Bulgaria) Nikolay Bodurov (yellow card) 36'
DF	6	(Bulgaria) Georgi Georgiev
DF	5	(Bulgaria) Dimitar Koemdzhiev (c)
MF	14	(Bulgaria) Lyubomir Vitanov (yellow card) 25' (substituted off) 68'
MF	15	(Bulgaria) Kiril Nikolov (substituted off) 55'
MF	18	(Bulgaria) Boris Galchev
MF	10	(Bulgaria) Todor Palankov (substituted off) 73'
MF	28	(Bulgaria) Daniel Peev
FW	7	(Bulgaria) Spas Delev
Substitutes:
GK	1	(Bulgaria) Ivaylo Ivanikov
MF	8	(Bulgaria) Blagoy Nakov (substituted in) 68'
FW	11	(Bulgaria) Mario Metushev
FW	19	(Bulgaria) Kaloyan Stoyanov (substituted in) 73'
MF	20	(North Macedonia) Dragi Kotsev (substituted in) 55'
DF	26	(Bulgaria) Yulian Popev
DF	27	(Bulgaria) Radoslav Mitrevski
Manager:
(Bosnia and Herzegovina) Naci Şensoy Assistant referees: (Bulgaria) Nikola Dzhuganski (Bulgaria) Nikolay Angelov; Fourth official: (Bulgaria) Tsvetan Georgiev

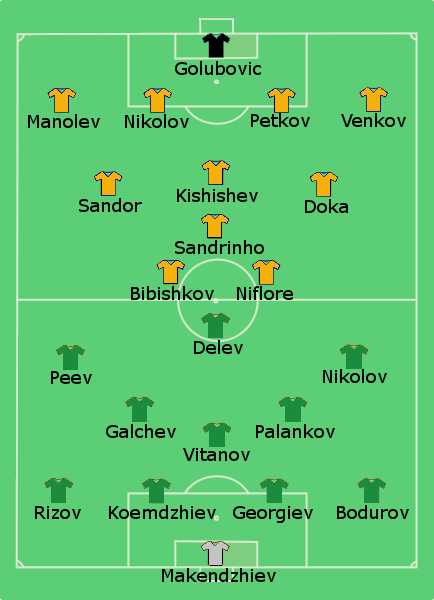

LITEX:
GK	1	(Serbia) Uroš Golubović
DF	16	(Bulgaria) Stanislav Manolev
DF	4	(Bulgaria) Ivaylo Petkov
DF	5	(Bulgaria) Mihail Venkov
DF	22	(Bulgaria) Plamen Nikolov (substituted off) 46'
MF	25	(Bulgaria) Radostin Kishishev (c) (yellow card) 37'
MF	15	(Brazil) Doka Madureira
MF	10	(Brazil) Sandrinho
MF	24	(Hungary) György Sándor (substituted off) 53'
FW	18	(Bulgaria) Krum Bibishkov (yellow card) 42'
FW	19	(France) Wilfried Niflore (substituted off) 87'
Substitutes:
GK	12	(Bulgaria) Todor Todorov
DF	2	(France) Alexandre Barthe (substituted in) 46'
MF	7	(Bulgaria) Strahil Popov
MF	8	(Brazil) Tom (substituted in) 53'
DF	23	(Bulgaria) Petar Zanev
FW	27	(Bulgaria) Momchil Tsvetanov (substituted in) 87'
MF	28	(Brazil) Diego Ferraresso
Manager:
(Bulgaria) Stanimir Stoilov

== See also ==
- 2008–09 A Group
