= Yuliyan Nenov =

Bulgarian footballer

Personal information
- Full name: Yuliyan Rumenov Nenov
- Date of birth: 17 November 1994 (age 31)
- Place of birth: Sofia, Bulgaria
- Height: 1.78 m (5 ft 10 in)
- Position: Winger

Team information
- Current team: Rilski Sportist
- Number: 94

Youth career
- 2003–2012: CSKA Sofia

Senior career*
Years	Team	Apps	(Gls)
2012–2015	CSKA Sofia	1	(0)
2013	→ Chavdar Etropole (loan)	2	(1)
2013–2014	→ Botev Vratsa (loan)	21	(2)
2014	→ Montana (loan)	3	(1)
2015	→ Lokomotiv GO (loan)	8	(2)
2015–2018	Dunav Ruse	99	(14)
2018	Botev Vratsa	19	(2)
2019	DHJ	8	(0)
2019	Beroe	7	(0)
2020	Dunav Ruse	9	(0)
2020–2022	Botev Vratsa	56	(8)
2022	Sutjeska Nikšić	1	(0)
2022–2023	Lokomotiv Sofia	21	(2)
2023–2024	Ħamrun Spartans	14	(1)
2024–2025	Lokomotiv Sofia	20	(1)
2025	Marek Dupnitsa	18	(1)
2026–	Rilski Sportist	0	(0)

International career
2010	Bulgaria U17	3	(0)
2013	Bulgaria U19	2	(0)
2015–2016	Bulgaria U21	8	(1)
- * Club domestic league appearances and goals as of 5 January 2026

Yuliyan Rumenov Nenov (Bulgarian: Юлиян Руменов Ненов; born 17 November 1994) is a Bulgarian professional footballer who currently plays as a winger for Rilski Sportist Samokov.

== Career ==
Nenov started his career at CSKA Sofia, joining their youth system in 2003, but failed to break into the first team and joined Chavdar Etropole, Botev Vratsa, Montana and Lokomotiv Gorna Oryahovitsa on loan before making a permanent move to Dunav Ruse in June 2015.

In his first campaign with Dunav Nenov scored 8 league goals, helping the team gain promotion to the First League.

On 31 May 2018, Nenov signed a two-year contract with the new member of the Bulgarian First League Botev Vratsa. After a stint in Morocco, he joined Beroe Stara Zagora as a free agent in May 2019.

== Career statistics ==
As of 19 June 2022

Club	Season	Division	League		Cup		Europe		Total	
Club	Season	Division	Apps	Goals	Apps	Goals	Apps	Goals	Apps	Goals
CSKA Sofia	2012–13	A Group	1	0	0	0	0	0	1	0
Chavdar Etropole (loan)	2012–13	B Group	2	1	0	0	–		2	1
Botev Vratsa (loan)	2013–14	B Group	21	2	1	0	–		22	2
Montana (loan)	2014–15	B Group	3	1	0	0	–		3	1
Lokomotiv GO (loan)	2014–15	B Group	8	2	2	0	–		10	2
Dunav Ruse	2015–16	B Group	27	8	2	2	–		29	10
Dunav Ruse	2016–17	First League	35	3	1	0	–		36	3
Dunav Ruse	2017–18	First League	37	3	2	1	2	0	41	4
Botev Vratsa	2018–19	First League	19	2	1	0	–		20	2
DHJ	2018–19	Botola	8	0	0	0	–		8	0
Beroe Stara Zagora	2019–20	First League	7	0	2	0	–		9	0
Dunav Ruse	2019–20	First League	11	0	0	0	–		11	0
Botev Vratsa	2020–21	First League	29	2	3	1	–		32	3
Botev Vratsa	2021–22	First League	29	7	1	1	–		30	8
Total			237	31	15	5	2	0	254	36

== Personal life ==
Nenov was born in Sofia. His father Rumen was also a footballer who played as a goalkeeper.

== Honours ==
Individual

- Bulgarian First League Goal of the Week: 2021–22 (Week 19) v. Lokomotiv Plovdiv
