= Nikolay Mihaylov (footballer) =

Bulgarian footballer (born 1988)

Nikolay Mihaylov Николай Михайлов
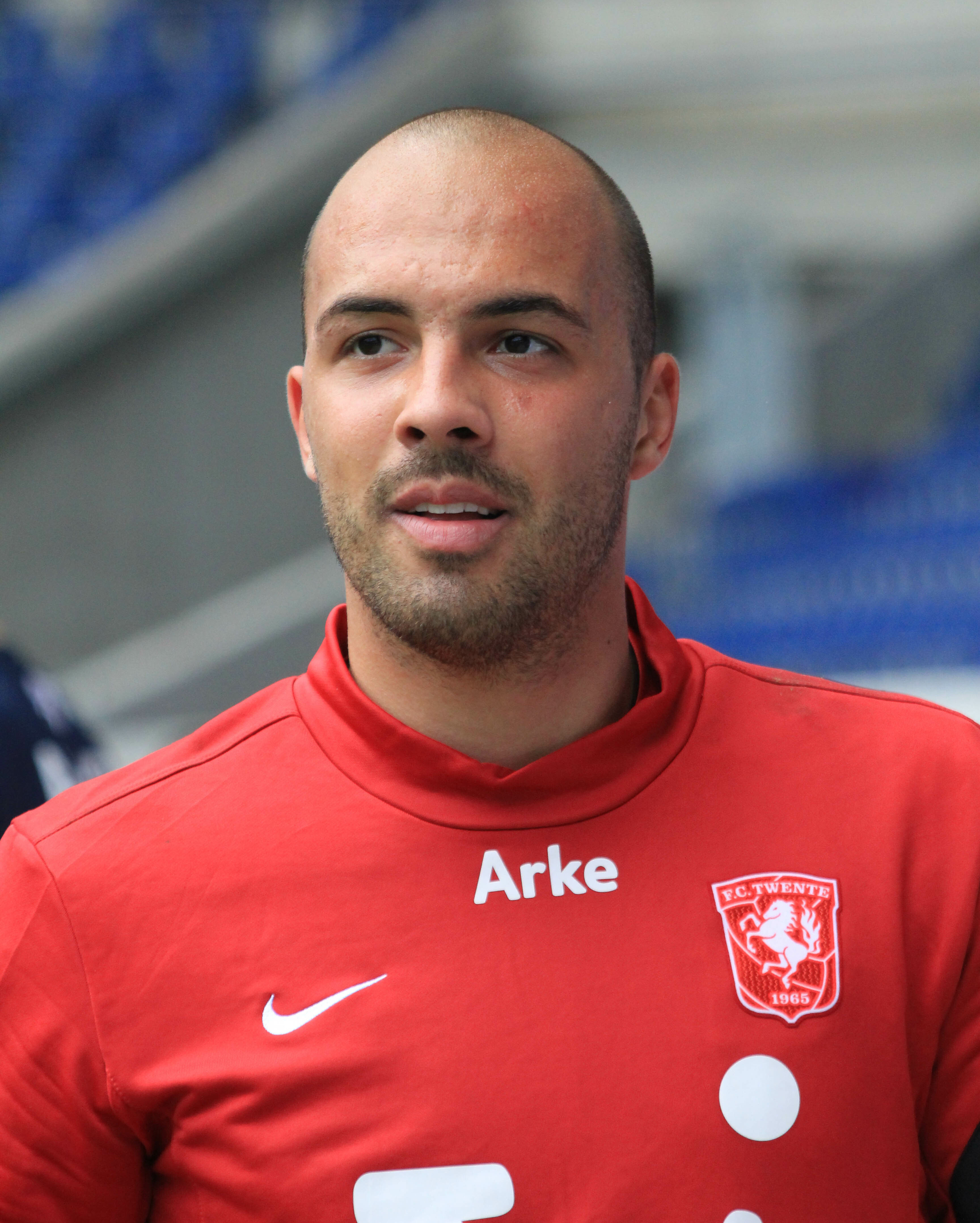
- Mihaylov in 2012

Personal information
- Full name: Nikolay Borislavov Mihaylov
- Date of birth: 28 June 1988 (age 38)
- Place of birth: Sofia, Bulgaria
- Height: 1.94 m (6 ft 4 in)
- Position: Goalkeeper

Youth career
- Levski Sofia

Senior career*
Years	Team	Apps	(Gls)
2004–2007	Levski Sofia	12	(0)
2007–2010	Liverpool	0	(0)
2007–2010	→ Twente (loan)	6	(0)
2010–2013	Twente	82	(0)
2013–2014	Hellas Verona	0	(0)
2014–2015	Mersin İdmanyurdu	9	(0)
2016–2017	Mersin İdmanyurdu	29	(0)
2017–2018	Omonia	10	(0)
2018–2024	Levski Sofia	52	(0)
Total		216	(0)

International career
2004–2008	Bulgaria U21	22	(1)
2006–2022	Bulgaria	46	(0)
- * Club domestic league appearances and goals

Nikolay Borislavov Mihaylov (Bulgarian: Николай Бориславов Михайлов; born 28 June 1988) is a Bulgarian former professional footballer who played as a goalkeeper.

== Personal life ==
Mihaylov's father was goalkeeper Borislav Mihaylov, the player with the second most international appearances for Bulgaria (after Stilyan Petrov) and head of the Bulgarian Football Union, and his grandfather was Biser Mihaylov, who also played in goal for Levski in the 1960s. Maria Petrova, a prominent world champion in rhythmic gymnastics, has been his stepmother since 1998.

== Club career ==
=== Levski Sofia ===
Talented Mihaylov started as a youngster with home country top team Levski Sofia, making his full 90 minutes debut at the age of just 17 in the UEFA cup match against Auxerre. He nevertheless was not popular with their fans. Mihaylov's poor performances in some matches, particularly his blunder in the Champions League game against Werder Bremen on 31 October 2006, provoked a negative campaign among Levski supporters who associated his career with protection from his influential father.

=== Liverpool ===
In June 2007, Mihaylov almost joined Fiorentina, but was instead transferred to Liverpool on a three-year contract, with an option for a further two years.

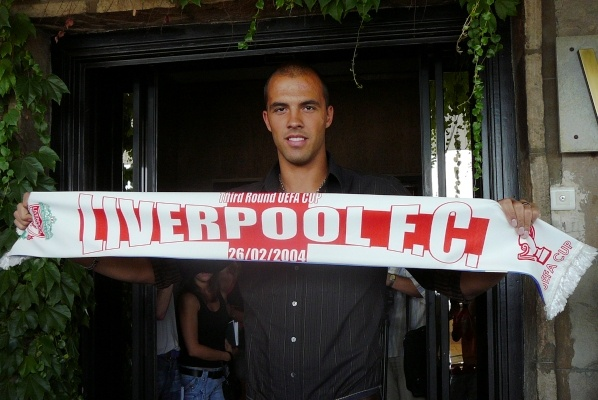
Mihaylov at Sofia airport

Mihaylov was acquired by Liverpool as a talent, who might become their first team keeper in the future, as at that time Liverpool's first choice keeper was Pepe Reina, with Charles Itandje as back up. By 14 July it became clear that the transfer had hit a problem; Mihaylov would not qualify for a British work permit. As a consequence the Bulgarian U-21 International joined FC Twente on a one-year loan. At FC Twente 19-year-old Mihaylov was to compete with Sander Boschker and Cees Paauwe for first team action. Although not playing any matches for the first team, Twente did recognize his talent and in 2008 they extended his loan with a year to August 2009.

=== Twente ===
On 27 August 2008, Mihaylov made his debut for FC Twente in their 4–0 defeat to Arsenal at the Emirates Stadium in the second leg of the third qualifying round for the UEFA Champions League and went on to make his Eredivisie debut in a 1–1 draw at Roda on 30 August 2008. On 14 March 2009, Mihaylov made his second appearance for Twente in the Dutch league against Willem II, playing the full 90 minutes and earning himself a booking, managing to keep a clean sheet in Twente's 2–0 away win. On 29 July 2009, Mihaylov came on as a substitute for midfielder Kenneth Perez, following the dismissal of starting keeper Sander Boschker in the 27th minute of Twente's away game against Sporting CP in the first leg of the UEFA Champions League third qualifying round. He stopped the penalty taken by João Moutinho and made a number of key saves to keep the scores level at 0–0. Mihaylov played the full 90 minutes in the return leg and was not at fault for the Portuguese side's last-minute equalizing goal, which allowed Sporting CP to advance on the away goals rule.

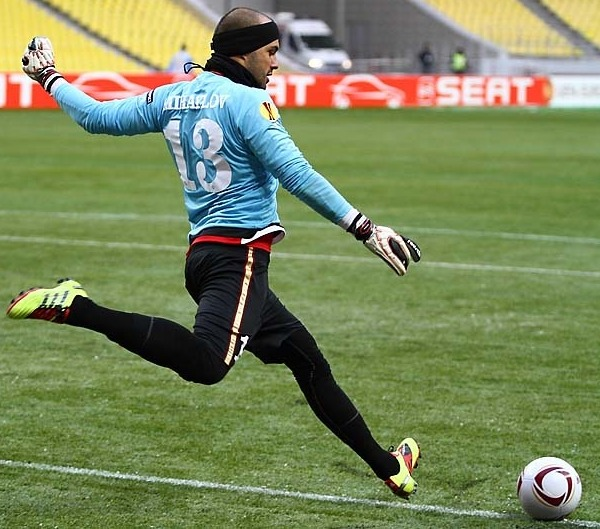
Mihaylov playing for FC Twente

FC Twente had become impressed with Mihaylov, not only his talent, but also his progress convinced them. And after several years of being loaned out to Twente, on 5 February 2010 he officially was transferred for a fee of €1.8 million from Liverpool to Twente. He signed a contract for three years with the Dutch club.

In the 2010–11 season, he established himself as the starting goalkeeper for Twente. Having played in the Champions League, Mihaylov impressed with great appearances in the competition that season, among others by stopping a penalty-shot. In the Champions League FC Twente drew to play against his "nightmare" club Werder Bremen, as it were mentioned by the Bulgarian media. He only conceded one goal in the two matches played against Werder. With further appearances against Tottenham Hotspur and the previous year's Champions League winner Inter Milan in the group, Twente managed on their debut in the Champions League nevertheless to end at third place, allowing continuation in the UEFA Europa League. Twente was defeated in the quarterfinals by Villarreal, after having defeated Rubin Kazan and Zenit Saint Petersburg.

Mihaylov was quoted saying that Liverpool now had retained an option to buy him back from Twente, as he had played enough games for his native country's national team to qualify for a work permit.

On 23 December 2011, Mihaylov attended a ceremony in Sofia, where he was honoured with the Bulgarian Footballer of the Year award (Stiliyan Petrov and Dimitar Berbatov came second and third respectively). The last Bulgarian goalkeeper to have received this distinction is his father Borislav.

=== Mersin ===
Mihaylov signed for Turkish club Mersin İdmanyurdu on 1 September 2014 on a two-year contract as a free agent. He made his debut in a 3–0 home win over Kemer Tekirovaspor in the Turkish Cup on 29 September. His Süper Lig debut came on 22 November, in a 2–2 away draw against Akhisar Belediyespor. On 27 December, Mihaylov played his second league game in a 1–0 loss against Fenerbahçe at Şükrü Saracoğlu Stadium, in which he saved a penalty from Diego.

=== Omonia ===
In December 2017, Mihaylov signed a contract with Cypriot club Omonia until the end of the season.

=== Return to Levski Sofia ===
On 26 November 2018, Mihaylov returned to Levski Sofia, signing a contract till the end of the season with an option to be extended for two more years. He quickly became the first choice goalkeeper, but lost his status shortly after the arrival of Milan Mijatović. He regained his place for the first half of season 2020–21 due to Mijatović's departure in the summer of 2020.

== International career ==
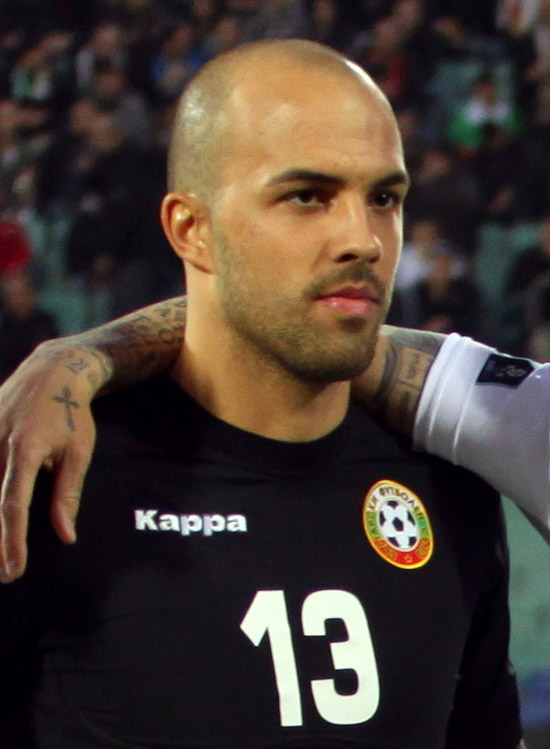
Mihaylov with Bulgaria in 2011

Mihaylov made his senior international debut in the 5–1 defeat by Scotland in the Kirin Cup in Japan in May 2006. On 12 August 2009, he earned his second cap, playing the full 90 minutes in a friendly match against Latvia, which Bulgaria won 1–0. Mihaylov did well to parry a dangerous Vitālijs Astafjevs shot in the second half, but was hardly tested during the game. He earned his third cap on 10 October 2009, after replacing the injured Dimitar Ivankov in the 1–4 away loss to Cyprus in a World Cup qualifier. Mihaylov was the starting goalkeeper for Bulgaria during the country's first two reasonably unsuccessful Euro 2012 qualifiers. He played as the main custodian for Bulgaria during the 2014 World Cup qualifiers, while Vladislav Stoyanov was selected for the last two matches - against Armenia and the Czech Republic.

== Career statistics ==
As of 26 May 2024

Appearances and goals by club, season and competition
Club	Season	League			Cups		Europe		Other		Total		Ref.
Club	Season	Division	Apps	Goals	Apps	Goals	Apps	Goals	Apps	Goals	Apps	Goals	Ref.
Levski Sofia	2004–05	A Group	1	0	1	0	0	0	–		2	0	
Levski Sofia	2005–06	A Group	6	0	0	0	1	0	–		7	0	
Levski Sofia	2006–07	A Group	5	0	0	0	1	0	–		6	0	
Liverpool	2007–08	Premier League	–		–		–		–		–		
Twente (loan)	2007–08	Eredivisie	0	0	0	0	0	0	–		0	0	
Twente (loan)	2008–09	Eredivisie	6	0	0	0	1	0	–		7	0	
Twente (loan)	2009–10	Eredivisie	0	0	3	0	2	0	–		5	0	
Twente	2010–11	Eredivisie	31	0	1	0	10	0	–		42	0	
Twente	2011–12	Eredivisie	25	0	2	0	13	0	–		40	0	
Twente	2012–13	Eredivisie	26	0	0	0	9	0	–		35	0	
Twente	Total		88	0	6	0	35	0	–		129	0	
Hellas Verona	2013–14	Serie A	0	0	1	0	0	0	–		1	0	
Mersin İdmanyurdu	2014–15	Süper Lig	6	0	8	0	0	0	–		14	0	
Mersin İdmanyurdu	2015–16	Süper Lig	3	0	0	0	0	0	–		3	0	
Mersin İdmanyurdu	2016–17	1. Lig	29	0	0	0	0	0	–		29	0	
Mersin İdmanyurdu	Total		38	0	8	0	0	0	–		46	0	
Omonia	2017–18	Cypriot First Division	5	0	0	0	0	0	5	0	10	0	
Levski Sofia	2018–19	Bulgarian First League	16	0	0	0	0	0	–		16	0	
Levski Sofia	2019–20	Bulgarian First League	0	0	1	0	0	0	–		1	0	
Levski Sofia	2020–21	Bulgarian First League	18	0	0	0	–		–		18	0	
Levski Sofia	2021–22	Bulgarian First League	29	0	0	0	–		–		29	0	
Levski Sofia	2022–23	Bulgarian First League	3	0	1	0	4	0	0	0	8	0	
Levski Sofia	2023–24	Bulgarian First League	4	0	0	0	0	0	0	0	4	0	
Levski Sofia	Total		71	0	3	0	6	0	–		80	0	
Career total			216	0	18	0	41	0	5	0	280	0	

== Honours ==
Levski Sofia

- A Group: 2005–06, 2006–07
- Bulgarian Cup: 2004–05, 2006–07,2021–22
- Bulgarian Supercup: 2005

Twente

- Eredivisie: 2009–10
- Johan Cruijff Shield: 2010, 2011
- KNVB Cup: 2011

Individual

- Bulgarian Footballer of the Year: 2011
- Dutch Football Goalkeeper of the Year: 2011
- Bulgarian First League Best Goalkeeper: 2021–22,
