= Ivo Trenchev =

Bulgarian footballer

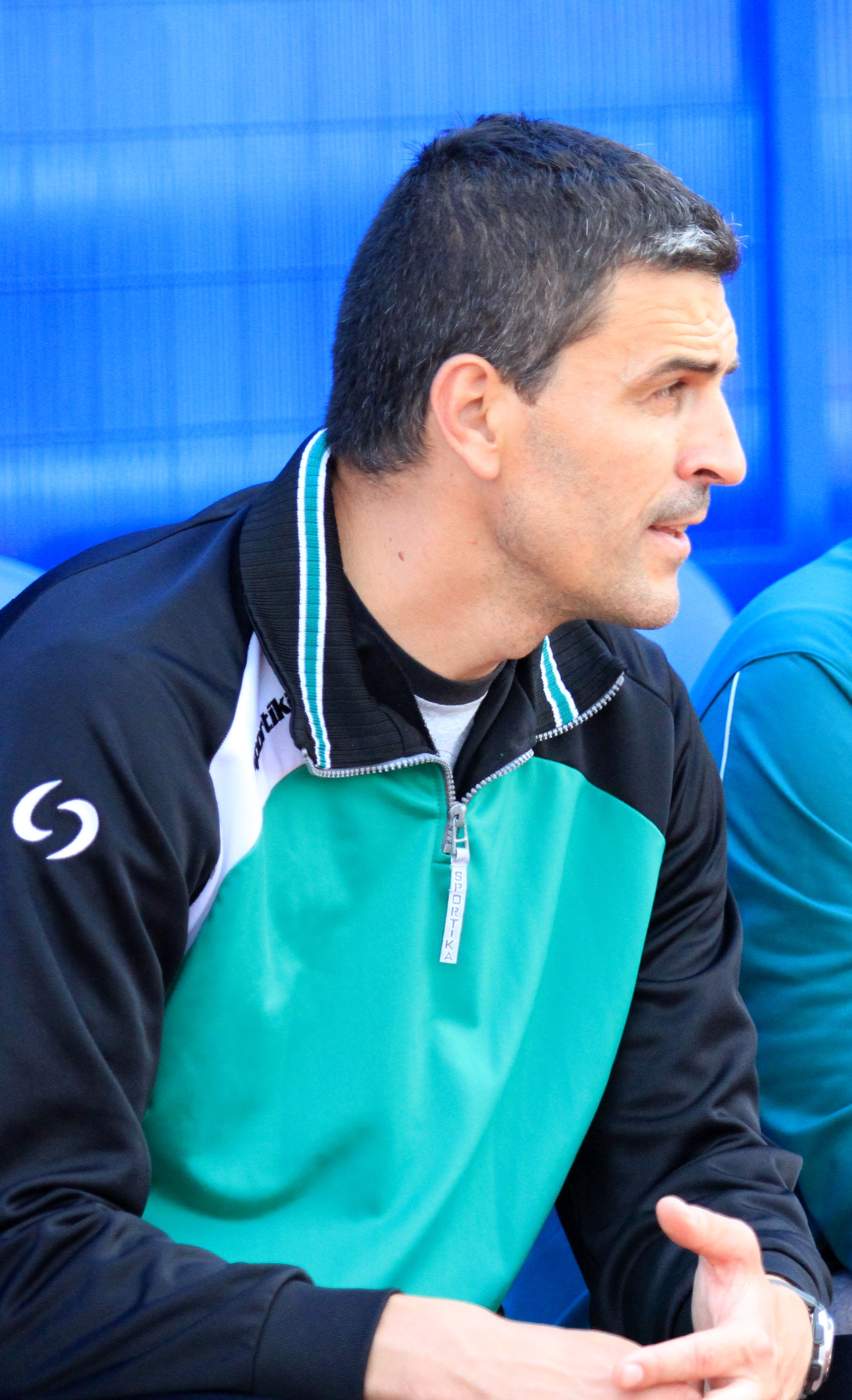

Personal information
- Full name: Ivo Kirilov Trenchev
- Date of birth: 4 April 1972 (age 54)
- Place of birth: Sandanski, Bulgaria
- Height: 1.90 m (6 ft 3 in)
- Position: Defender

Senior career*
Years	Team	Apps	(Gls)
1994–1997	Pirin Blagoevgrad	73	(0)
1997–1999	Slavia Sofia	41	(2)
1999–2001	CSKA Sofia	24	(3)
2001–2002	Levski Sofia	19	(1)
2002–2003	Spartak Varna	7	(0)
2003	Shaanxi Guoli	22	(0)
2004	Terek Grozny	19	(1)
2004–2005	Lokomotiv Sofia	27	(1)
2006–2008	Henan Jianye	56	(4)
2008	Lokomotiv Mezdra	13	(0)
2009–2010	Septemvri Simitli	23	(1)
2011	Perun Kresna	17	(0)
2012	Pirin Blagoevgrad	10	(0)
Total		345	(13)

Managerial career
- 2013–2015: Pirin Blagoevgrad (assistant)
- 2015: Pirin Blagoevgrad
- 2015: Montana (assistant)
- 2016–2017: Septemvri Simitli
- 2017: Henan Jianye (assistant)
- 2018–2019: Belasitsa Petrich
- 2019: Pirin Blagoevgrad
- 2020: Septemvri Simitli
- 2022–2023: Belasitsa Petrich
- 2023–2024: Pirin Blagoevgrad
- * Club domestic league appearances and goals

Ivo Kirilov Trenchev (Bulgarian: Иво Кирилов Тренчев; born 4 April 1972) is a former Bulgarian footballer who played as a defender.

== Honours ==
Levski Sofia

- Champion of Bulgaria 2002

Henan Jianye

- China League One: 2006

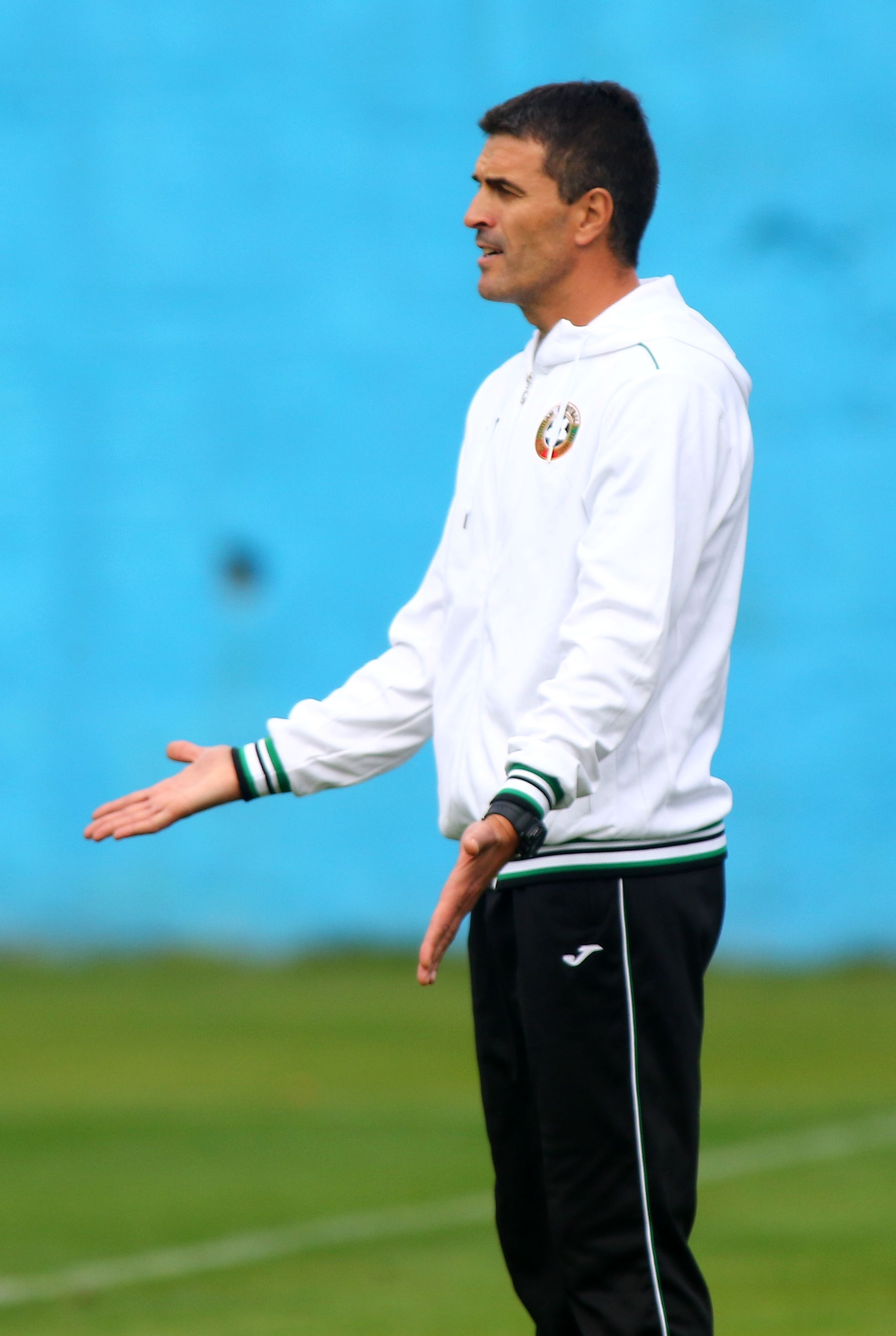
