= OFC Pirin Blagoevgrad =

Bulgarian football club

Pirin Blagoevgrad
- Full name: Футболен клуб Пирин АД; Football club Pirin AD (Pirin Football Club)
- Nickname: Орлетата (The Eagles)
- Founded: 1922; 104 years ago
- Ground: Stadion Hristo Botev
- Capacity: 8,000
- Chairman: Adalbert Zafirov
- Head coach: Vladislav Vutov
- League: Second League
- 2025–26: Second League, 11th of 17
- Website: fcpirin.com
| Home colours | Away colours |

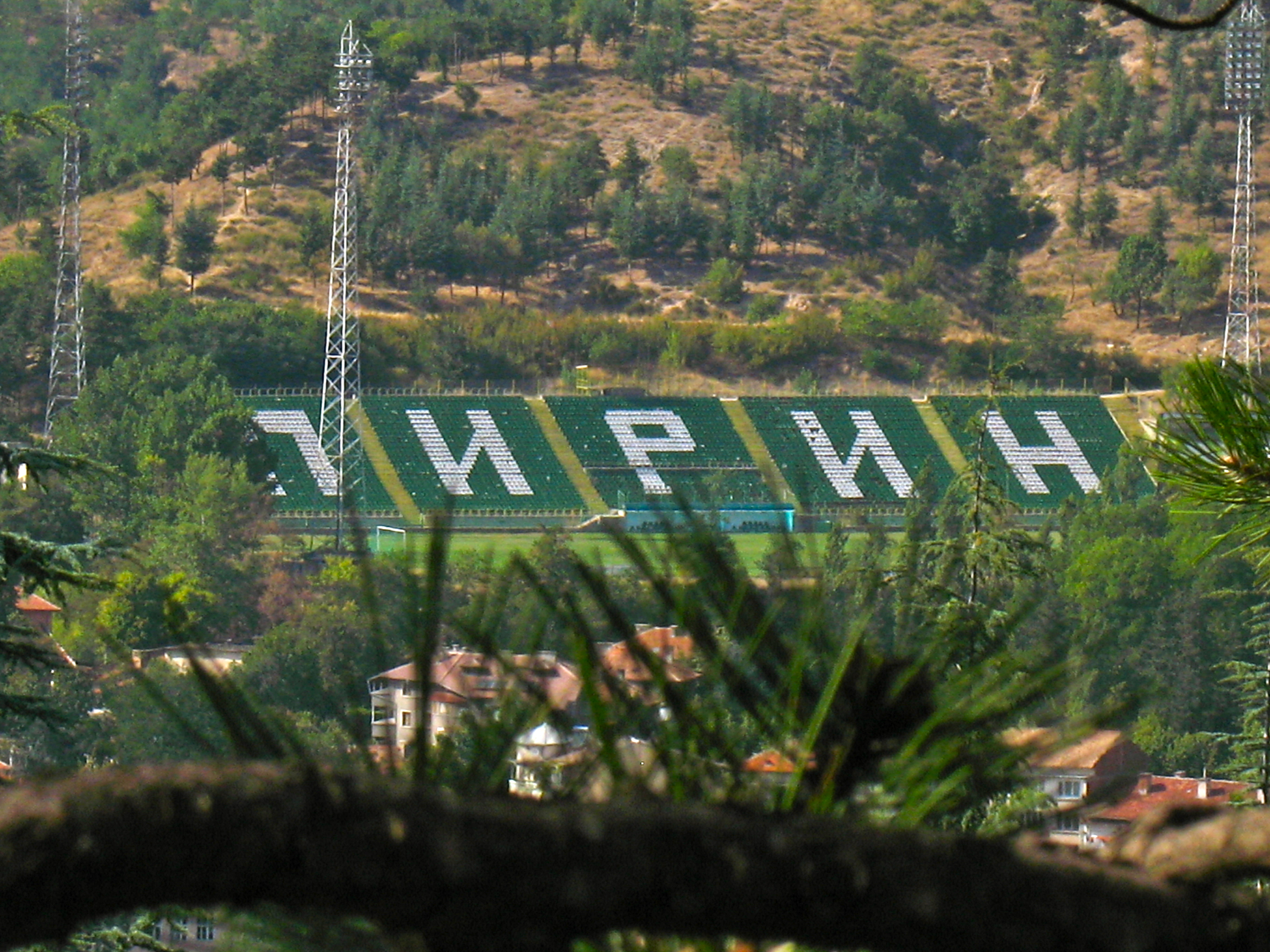
Hristo Botev Stadium

Football club Pirin (Bulgarian: Футболен клуб „Пирин“), also known as Pirin Blagoevgrad, is a Bulgarian football club based in Blagoevgrad, which currently competes in the Second League, the second division of Bulgarian football.

The club was founded in 2008, after a merger between two clubs from Blagoevgrad, Pirin 1922 and PFC Pirin Blagoevgrad. By an official court decision later that year, the club was announced as a historical successor of the club records of the former FC Pirin, founded in 1922. In 2011, following the bankruptcy of the entity, which represented the football club, Pirin's football department was merged once again with Perun Kresna, to eventually become OFC Pirin.

The club's name is adopted from Pirin, a mountain range in southwestern Bulgaria. Their home ground is the Stadion Hristo Botev in Blagoevgrad with a capacity of 7,500 spectators. Pirin's nickname is Orletata (The Eaglets) and their kit colours are green and white.

To date, the club has four domestic cup finals and most notably, enjoys high praise for its development of football players, as several noted Bulgarian footballers were produced by Pirin's youth academy. Among them are the 1994 FIFA World Cup bronze medallists Petar Mihtarski and Ivaylo Andonov, as well as former Manchester United striker Dimitar Berbatov, who won two Premier League titles and was the 2010-11 Premier League top goalscorer.

Pirin share a regional rivalry with Marek Dupnitsa, as the two clubs are among the most successful ones from Southwestern Bulgaria.

== History ==
=== FC Pirin ===
One of FC Pirin Blagoevgrad's predecessors, FC Pirin, was founded in 1922. FC Pirin has played more than 20 seasons in the top flight and has competed twice in the European football competitions with one participation in the UEFA Cup and one participation in the Cup Winners' Cup respectively. The club's first participation in the UEFA tournaments was not promising. In 1985, Pirin faced the then reigning Swedish champion Hammarby IF. The first game in Blagoevgrad, ended with a 1–3 loss. The second game in Sweden was also a defeat – 0–4 and Pirin were out of the European competitions. Pirin's best season in the Bulgarian top division was in the 1984–85 season, where they finished at 5th place at the end of the season. The club was also three times runner-up of the Bulgarian Cup. Also, Pirin's youth academy is attributed as being one of the best developers of young and unknown players in Bulgaria. Among the club's famous players are Dimitar Berbatov, Spas Delev, Petar Mihtarski, Ivaylo Andonov, Ivan Tsvetkov, Vladislav Zlatinov and Petar Zlatinov.

On August 18, 2006, after failing to arrange some debts and signals of corruption, Pirin was expelled from the A PFG, the team's results for the season were annulled, and the club was relegated to the Bulgarian South-West V AFG. However, after two years, Pirin won the South-West V AFG and the club returned for the upcoming season of the Western B PFG.

=== Unification ===
In December 2008, Pirin, which competed in the Western B PFG, was merged with PFC Pirin Blagoevgrad, (former FC Makedonska Slava), which played in the A PFG after a significant pressure from the supporters in the town. The new club was named FC Pirin Blagoevgrad and was soon proclaimed as a holder of the club records of the former FC Pirin, which competed for more than 20 seasons in the top flight. FC Pirin's West B PFG place was taken by FC Bansko. Then, Nikolay Galchev appointed Petar Mihtarski as a manager of the club. A few months later, under Naci Şensoy's management, the successes followed-up and Pirin qualified for the final of the Bulgarian Cup, eliminating subsequently on their way CSKA Sofia and Levski Sofia. In the final match played at the Georgi Asparuhov Stadium in Sofia, Pirin were eliminated after a 3–0 defeat against Litex Lovech.

=== OFK Pirin ===
In the foremath of the 2011–12 season, Pirin Blagoevgrad failed to receive a professional license for the A Group. However, due to their financial struggles they were also rejected to participate in the South-West V AFG. Later that year, they acquired the license of Perun Kresna. The team finished 2011-12 season as Perun, but for 2012-13 the team was renamed to Obshtinski futbolen klub Pirin (Bulgarian: Общиснки футболен клуб „Пирин“), meaning Pirin Minicipal Football Club, as the club was owned by Blagoevgrad Municipality.

In 2015, the club achieved promotion to the A Group after a four-year absence from top-flight football. The 2015-16 season ended in an 8th place finish out of 10 teams in a modified season format. The next season (2016–17), Pirin again managed to avoid relegation. However the team was relegated from the A Group after the 2017-18 season.

On 11 June 2019, OFK Pirin secured a one-year sponsorship agreement and advertising partnership with the investment company Emirates Wealth EAD. In July, Blagoevgrad Municipality approved a business plan by the company discussing the future development of the club, in particular the partnership between the two sides, phases in acquiring participatory management, investment schemes, club finances and aims. The plan saw Emirates Wealth EAD become a majority owner, as it acquired 75% of the OFK Pirin's shares, with 25% remaining in Blagoevgrad Municipality's ownership. Part of obtaining participatory management saw the creation of a new association, a joint-stock company named Futbolen klub Pirin AD (Bulgarian: Футболен клуб „Пирин“ АД), meaning Pirin Football Club, where OFK Pirin, owned by the municipality, was merged into.

In 2021, Pirin managed to return to the First League after three years of absence.

After three seasons in the First League, Pirin was relegated back to the Second League at the conclusion of the 2023–24 season.

== Colours and badge ==
Currently, the team's home kit is green and the away kit is white. Various combinations of green and white have been used throughout the club's history.

== Honours ==
=== Domestic ===
- Second League:
  - Winners (5): 1972–73, 1981–82, 1983–84, 2006–07, 2020–21
- Bulgarian Cup:
  - Runners-up (4): 1981, 1992, 1994, 2009

== European Record ==
| Season | Competition | Round | Country | Club | Home | Away | Aggregate |
|---|---|---|---|---|---|---|---|
| 1985–86 | UEFA Cup | 1 | (Sweden) | Hammarby | 1–3 | 0–4 | 1–7 |
| 1994–95 | Cup Winners' Cup | QR | (Liechtenstein) | Schaan | 3–0 | 1–0 | 4–0 |
| 1994–95 | Cup Winners' Cup | 1 | (Greece) | Panathinaikos | 0–2 | 1–6 | 1–8 |

== Players ==
=== Current squad ===
As of 23 July 2026

Note: Flags indicate national team as defined under FIFA eligibility rules; some limited exceptions apply. Players may hold more than one non-FIFA nationality.

| No. | Pos. | Nation | Player |
|---|---|---|---|
| 1 | GK | BUL | Borislav Smilyanski |
| 3 | DF | BUL | Dean Ivanov |
| 4 | DF | BUL | Georgi Korichkov |
| 5 | DF | BUL | Yordan Kostov |
| 6 | MF | BUL | Nikola Bandev |
| 7 | FW | BUL | Ivaylo Ivanov |
| 8 | MF | BUL | Bozhidar Malinov |
| 9 | FW | BUL | Kristiyan Bachev |
| 10 | FW | BUL | Toni Tasev |
| 11 | MF | BUL | Roman Rodopski |
| 12 | DF | BUL | Martin Dichev |
| 14 | MF | BUL | Aleksandar Bliznakov |

| No. | Pos. | Nation | Player |
|---|---|---|---|
| 15 | DF | BUL | Petar Kepov |
| 17 | DF | BUL | Miroslav Georgiev |
| 20 | DF | BUL | Martin Georgiev |
| 21 | MF | BUL | Kiril Petsev |
| 23 | DF | BUL | Kristiyan Kurbanov |
| 29 | FW | BUL | Stanislav Kostov |
| 30 | FW | BUL | Ivo Kazakov |
| 44 | DF | BUL | Miki Orachev |
| 76 | GK | BUL | Krasimir Kostov |
| 80 | MF | BUL | Metodiy Stefanov |
| 98 | DF | BUL | Nasko Tsekov |
| 99 | GK | BUL | Preslav Stoyanov |

For recent transfers, see Transfers winter 2025–26 and Transfers summer 2026.

=== Foreign players ===
Up to twenty foreign nationals can be registered and given a squad number for the first team in the Bulgarian First League, however only five non-EU nationals can be used during a match day. Those non-EU nationals with European ancestry can claim citizenship from the nation their ancestors came from. If a player does not have European ancestry he can claim Bulgarian citizenship after playing in Bulgaria for 5 years.

EU Nationals

EU Nationals (Dual citizenship)

Non-EU Nationals

== Notable players ==
Had international caps for their respective countries, held any club record, or have more than 100 league appearances. Players whose name is listed in bold represented their countries.

Bulgaria

- (Bulgaria) **Ivaylo Andonov**
- (Bulgaria) Aleksandar Bashliev
- (Bulgaria) Ventsislav Bengyuzov
- (Bulgaria) **Dimitar Berbatov**
- (Bulgaria) **Krasimir Bezinski**
- (Bulgaria) **Krum Bibishkov**
- (Bulgaria) Marsel Bibishkov
- (Bulgaria) Dimitar Blagov
- (Bulgaria) **Nikolay Bodurov**
- (Bulgaria) **Yordan Bozdanski**
- (Bulgaria) **Valentin Dartilov**
- (Bulgaria) Georgi Daskalov
- (Bulgaria) **Spiro Debarski**
- (Bulgaria) **Spas Delev**
- (Bulgaria) **Svetoslav Dyakov**
- (Bulgaria) Aleksandar Dyulgerov
- (Bulgaria) **Boris Galchev**
- (Bulgaria) **Georgi Georgiev**
- (Bulgaria) **Georgi Georgiev**
- (Bulgaria) **Kostadin Hazurov**
- (Bulgaria) **Dimitar Iliev**
- (Bulgaria) Ivaylo Ivanikov
- (Bulgaria) **Radoslav Kirilov**
- (Bulgaria) Anton Kostadinov
- (Bulgaria) **Stanislav Kostov**
- (Bulgaria) **Stanislav Manolev**
- (Brazil) (Bulgaria) **Marquinhos**
- (Bulgaria) **Petar Mihtarski**
- (Bulgaria) **Dobromir Mitov**
- (Bulgaria) Radoslav Mitrevski
- (Bulgaria) **Daniel Mladenov**
- (Bulgaria) **Yordan Murlev**
- (Bulgaria) Stilyan Nikolov
- (Bulgaria) **Malin Orachev**
- (Bulgaria) **Georgi Petrov**
- (Bulgaria) **Yuliyan Popev**
- (Bulgaria) **Todor Pramatarov**
- (Bulgaria) **Milen Radukanov**
- (Bulgaria) Rumen Sandev
- (Bulgaria) **Stoycho Stoilov**
- (Bulgaria) Toni Tasev
- (Bulgaria) **Radoslav Tsonev**
- (Bulgaria) **Ivan Tsvetkov**
- (Bulgaria) **Pavel Vidanov**
- (Bulgaria) **Kostadin Yanchev**
- (Bulgaria) **Preslav Yordanov**
- (Bulgaria) **Atanas Zehirov**
- (Bulgaria) **Vladislav Zlatinov**
- (Bulgaria) **Hristo Zlatinski**

Europe

- (Latvia) **Vitālijs Jagodinskis**
- (Slovakia) **Kristián Koštrna**

Africa

- (Central African Republic) **Karl Namnganda**
- (Benin) **Steve Traoré**

Asia

- (Kyrgyzstan) **Nazim Ajiev**
- (Kyrgyzstan) **Nematjan Zakirov**
- (Uzbekistan) **Georgi Georgiev**

== Past seasons ==
=== Last Seasons ===
| Season | League | Place | W | D | L | GF | GA | Pts | Bulgarian Cup |
|---|---|---|---|---|---|---|---|---|---|
| 2012–13 | V Group (III) | 3 | 19 | 5 | 6 | 69 | 26 | 62 | not qualified |
| 2013–14 | V Group | 1 | 25 | 4 | 1 | 87 | 6 | 79 | not qualified |
| 2014–15 | B Group (II) | 2 | 17 | 10 | 3 | 52 | 15 | 61 | First round |
| 2015–16 | A Group (I) | 8 | 5 | 11 | 16 | 27 | 45 | 26 | First round |
| 2016–17 | First League (I) | 10 | 12 | 7 | 13 | 41 | 44 | 43 | Quarterfinals |
| 2017–18 | First League | 14 | 7 | 9 | 16 | 29 | 42 | 30 | First round |
| 2018–19 | Second League (II) | 13 | 9 | 4 | 17 | 29 | 49 | 31 | First round |
| 2019–20 | Second League | 11 | 6 | 7 | 7 | 24 | 29 | 25 | Preliminary round |
| 2020–21 | Second League | 1 | 20 | 5 | 5 | 66 | 26 | 65 | Round of 32 |
| 2021–22 | First League (I) | 11 | 7 | 6 | 13 | 13 | 34 | 41 | Round of 16 |
| 2022–23 | First League (I) | 13 | 5 | 9 | 16 | 21 | 39 | 24 | Round of 32 |
Green marks a season followed by promotion, red a season followed by relegation.

== Personnel ==
=== Club officials ===
| Position | Name | Nationality |
Coaching staff
| Head coach | Oleksandr Babych | (Ukraine) |
| Assistant coach | Artem Filimonov | (Ukraine) |
| Assistant coach | Miroslav Mitev | (Bulgaria) |
| Goalkeepers coach | Oleksandr Lavrentsov | (Ukraine) |
| Physiotherapist | Andrey Polonskyi | (Ukraine) |
Management
| Chief Executive Officer | Petar Zanev | (Bulgaria) |
| Sporting director | Petar Mihtarski | (Bulgaria) |
| Academy manager | Radoslav Mitrevski | (Bulgaria) |

=== Managerial history ===
| Dates | Name | Honours |
|---|---|---|
| 2011–2014 | (Bulgaria) Kostadin Gerganchev | 1 V AFG title |
| 2014–2015 | (Bulgaria) Yordan Samokovliyski | promotion to A Group |
| 2015 | (Bulgaria) Ivo Trenchev (interim) | promotion to A Group |
| 2015 | (Bulgaria) Nedelcho Matushev | |
| 2015–2016 | (Kosovo) (Turkey) Naci Şensoy | |
| 2016−2017 | (Bulgaria) Stefan Genov | |
| 2017−2018 | (Bulgaria) Milen Radukanov | Relegation to Second Professional League |
| 2018–2019 | (Bulgaria) Petar Zlatinov | |
| 2019–2019 | (Bulgaria) Ivan Stoychev | |
| 2019 | (Bulgaria) Ivo Trenchev | |
| 2019–2021 | (Northern Ireland) Warren Feeney | 1st place promotion to First Professional League |
| 2021–2022 | (Bulgaria) Radoslav Mitrevski | |
| 2022 | (Bulgaria) Krasimir Petrov | |
| 2022 | (Bulgaria) Vasil Petrov (interim) | |
| 2022–2023 | (Bulgaria) Hristo Yanev | |
| 2023 | (Bulgaria) Radoslav Mitrevski | |
| 2023–2024 | (Bulgaria) Ivo Trenchev | |
| 2024– | (Ukraine) Oleksandr Babych | |
