= Krasimir Kostov =

Bulgarian footballer (born 1995)

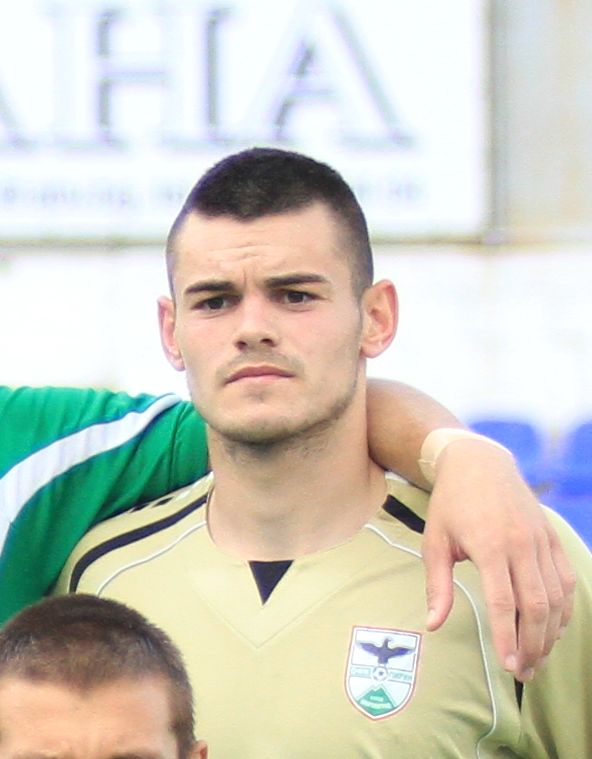

Personal information
- Full name: Krasimir Ivanov Kostov
- Date of birth: 11 February 1995 (age 31)
- Place of birth: Petrich, Bulgaria
- Height: 1.78 m (5 ft 10 in)
- Position: Goalkeeper

Team information
- Current team: Pirin Blagoevgrad
- Number: 76

Youth career
- 2007–2013: Pirin 2001

Senior career*
Years	Team	Apps	(Gls)
2014	Pirin Razlog	7	(0)
2014–2018	Pirin Blagoevgrad	73	(0)
2018–2024	Botev Vratsa	161	(0)
2024–	Pirin Blagoevgrad	66	(0)

International career
2015–2016	Bulgaria U21	2	(0)
- * Club domestic league appearances and goals as of 11 June 2026

Krasimir Kostov (Bulgarian: Красимир Костов; born 11 February 1995) is a Bulgarian footballer currently playing as a goalkeeper for Pirin Blagoevgrad.

== Career ==
Kostov started to play football in the local side of his home village Kolarovo, Petrich Municipality. In 2007, when he was 12 years old, he joined Pirin 2001 Football Academy, where he honed his footballing skills.

In January 2014, Kostov signed with B Group club Pirin Razlog. He made his senior debut on 12 April 2014, keeping a clean sheet in a 3–0 home win over Haskovo. Kostov ended the season with 5 clean sheets out of 7 appearances.

In June 2014, Kostov joined Pirin Blagoevgrad. His first season with Pirin went very well and he had kept clean sheets in 14 of his 18 appearances, helping the club to win promotion to the A Group. On 9 July 2015, Kostov signed his first professional contract in his career. He made his A Group debut in a 1–1 home draw against Cherno More Varna on 19 July 2015.

On 21 June 2018, Kostov signed with Botev Vratsa.
