= Ivaylo Ivanikov =

Bulgarian footballer

Personal information
- Full name: Ivaylo Ivanikov
- Date of birth: 17 May 1971 (age 55)
- Place of birth: Bulgaria
- Height: 1.85 m (6 ft 1 in)
- Position: Goalkeeper

Senior career*
Years	Team	Apps	(Gls)
1995–2003	Pirin Blagoevgrad	166	(0)
2003–2006	Belasitsa Petrich	54	(0)
2006–2010	Pirin Blagoevgrad	187	(0)
- * Club domestic league appearances and goals

Ivaylo Ivanikov (Bulgarian: Ивайло Иваников; born 17 May 1971) is a Bulgarian former footballer who played as a goalkeeper.

Ivanikov returned to Pirin Blagoevgrad in summer 2006, after five years with Belasitsa Petrich. In summer 2009, he retired as a player but became a goalkeeper coach at Pirin Blagoevgrad. Despite this he remained registered as a player for the 2009–10 season. He was released as a coach by Pirin in 2012, and moved to London, England and worked as a house painter.
