= Radoslav Mitrevski =

Bulgarian footballer

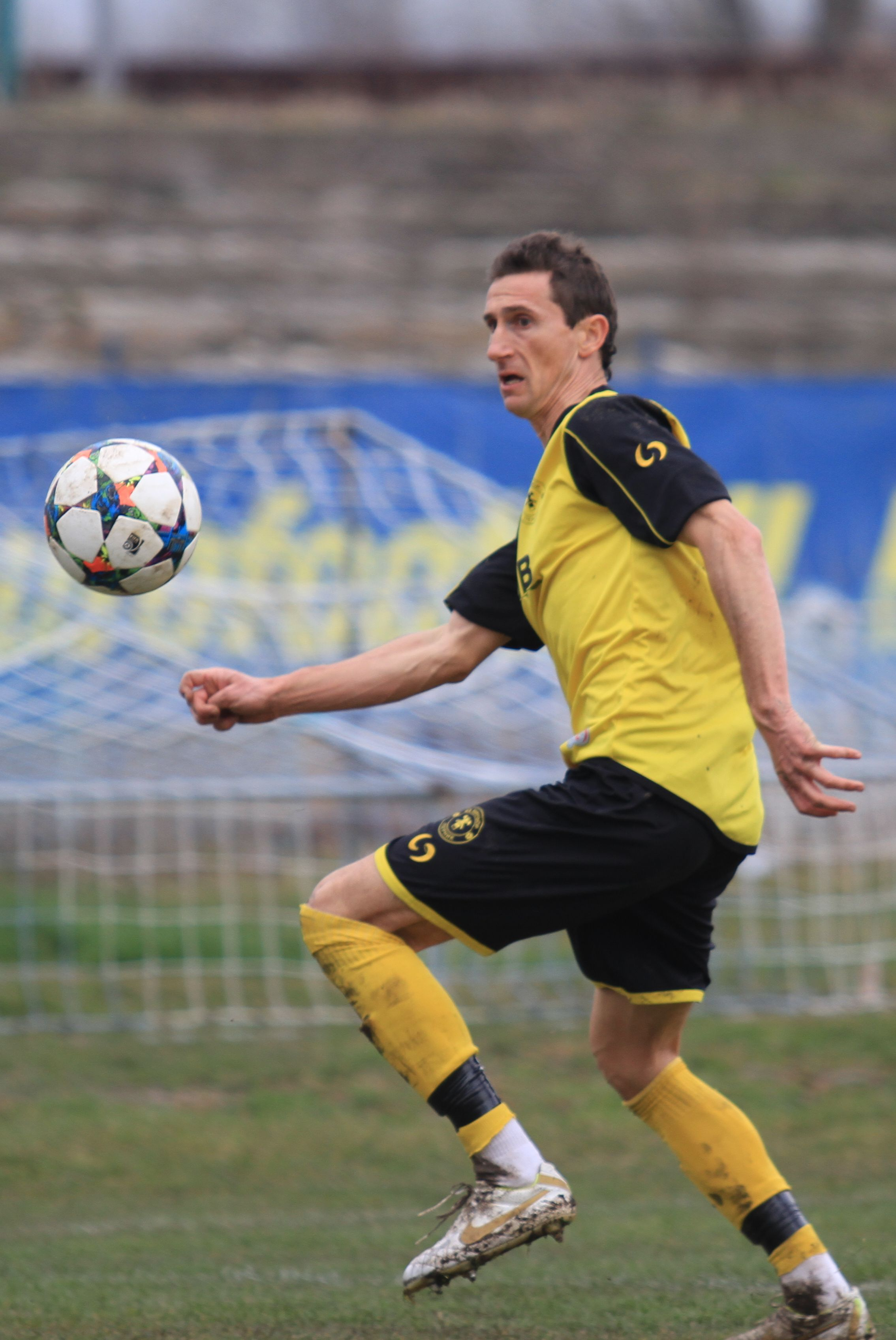

Personal information
- Full name: Radoslav Lyubenov Mitrevski
- Date of birth: 22 April 1981 (age 45)
- Place of birth: Blagoevgrad, Bulgaria
- Height: 1.84 m (6 ft 1/2 in)
- Position: Defender

Youth career
- Pirin Blagoevgrad

Senior career*
Years	Team	Apps	(Gls)
2000–2003	Pirin Blagoevgrad	?	(?)
2003–2004	CSKA Sofia	3	(0)
2004	Marek Dupnitsa	8	(0)
2006–2008	Pirin Blagoevgrad	5	(0)
2008–2009	→ FC Bansko (loan)	14	(0)
2009–2011	Pirin Blagoevgrad	50	(0)
2011	Vidima-Rakovski	4	(0)
2012	Pirin Blagoevgrad	?	(?)
2012–2015	Septemvri Simitli	68	(1)
2016–2017	Minyor Pernik	41	(2)

Managerial career
- 2019–2021: Pirin Blagoevgrad (assistant)
- 2021–2022: Pirin Blagoevgrad
- 2023: Pirin Blagoevgrad
- * Club domestic league appearances and goals

Radoslav Lyubenov Mitrevski (Bulgarian: Радослав Любенов Митревски; born 22 April 1981) is a former Bulgarian footballer, who played as a defender.

Mitrevski previously played for CSKA Sofia, Marek Dupnitsa, Pirin Blagoevgrad and Minyor Pernik.
