= 2025–26 PFC Levski Sofia season =

Levski Sofia
2025–26 season
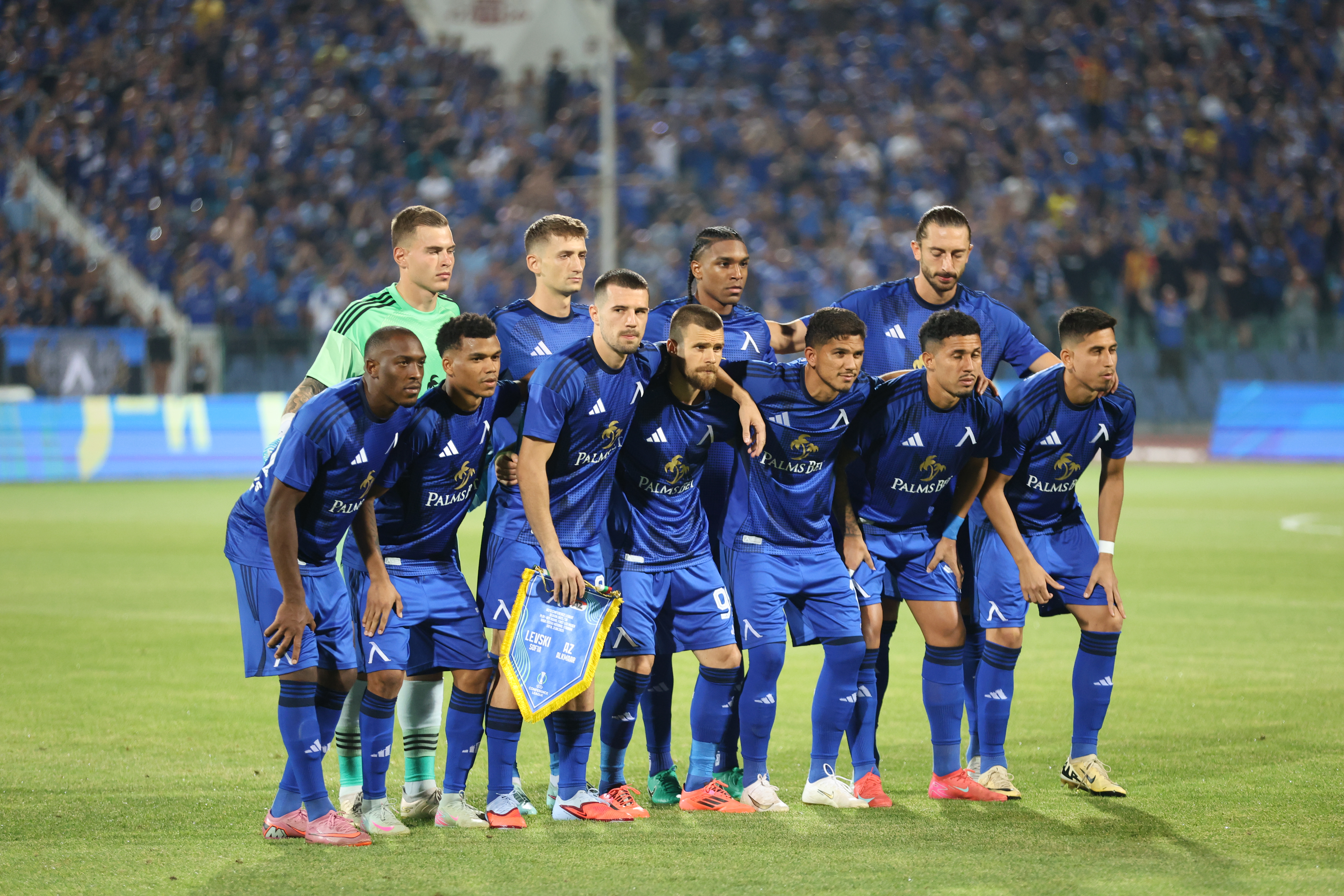
- Before kick-off against AZ, 21 August 2025
- Chairman: Nasko Sirakov
- Manager: Julio Velázquez
- Stadium: Stadion Georgi Asparuhov
- First League: 1st
- Bulgarian Cup: Quarter-finals
- Bulgarian Supercup: Runners-up
- UEFA Europa League: Second qualifying round
- UEFA Conference League: Play-off round
- Top goalscorer: League: Everton Bala (18); All: Everton Bala (19)
- Highest home attendance: 29,930 v. AZ (21 August 2025)
- Lowest home attendance: 1,500 v. Vitosha Bistritsa (11 December 2025)
- Average home league attendance: 10,494
- Biggest win: 7–0 v. Septemvri Sofia (H)
- Biggest defeat: 1–4 v. AZ (A)
Home colours	Away colours	Third colours

The 2025–26 season was Levski Sofia's 105th season in the First League. This article shows player statistics and all matches (official and friendly) that the club has played during the season.

It was one of the most memorable seasons in the club's history, as Levski became First League champions for the first time since 2009, ending Ludogorets Razgrad's hegemony of fourteen consecutive First League titles, and also winning their first trophy since the 2021–22 Bulgarian Cup.

== Transfers ==
=== In ===
No.	Pos.	Nat.	Name	Age	EU	Moving from	Type	Transfer window	Ends	Transfer fee	Source
6	DF	(Croatia)	Stipe Vulikić	25	EU	(Italy) Sampdoria	Transfer	Winter	2028	Undisclosed	
9	FW	(Colombia)	Juan Perea	26	Non-EU	(Bulgaria) Lokomotiv Plovdiv	Transfer	Winter	2028	Undisclosed	
11	FW	(Republic of Ireland)	Armstrong Oko-Flex	23	EU	(Bulgaria) Botev Plovdiv	Transfer	Winter	2028	300 000 €	
22	MF	(France)	Mazire Soula	27	EU	(Bulgaria) Cherno More	Transfer	Summer	2028	Free	
31	DF	(North Macedonia)	Nikola Serafimov	26	Non-EU	(Hungary) Fehérvár	Transfer	Summer	2028	Free	
37	MF	(Brazil)	Rildo	25	Non-EU	(Portugal) Santa Clara	Loan	Summer	2026	60 000 €	
45	FW	(Croatia)	Marko Dugandžić	31	EU	(South Korea) Seoul	Transfer	Winter	2026	Free	
47	MF	(Algeria)	Akram Bouras	23	Non-EU	(Algeria) MC Alger	Transfer	Summer	2028	350 000 €	
77	FW	(Bulgaria)	Borislav Rupanov	20	EU	(Bulgaria) Septemvri Sofia	Loan return	Summer			
78	GK	(Bulgaria)	Martin Lukov	32	EU	(Bulgaria) Lokomotiv Plovdiv	Transfer	Summer	2027	Free	
99	FW	(Bulgaria)	Radoslav Kirilov	32	EU	(Bulgaria) CSKA 1948	Transfer	Summer	2027	Free	
	MF	(Bulgaria)	Asen Chandarov	26	EU	(Bulgaria) Septemvri Sofia	Loan return	Summer			
	MF	(Nigeria)	Clement Ikenna	22	Non-EU	(Ukraine) Kryvbas Kryvyi Rih	Loan return	Summer			
	MF	(Bulgaria)	Antoan Stoyanov	20	EU	(Bulgaria) Botev Vratsa	Loan return	Summer			

=== Out ===
No.	Pos.	Nat.	Name	Age	EU	Moving to	Type	Transfer window	Transfer fee	Source
5	DF	(Netherlands)	Kellian van der Kaap	26	EU	(Qatar) Al-Sailiya	Transfer	Summer	500 000 €	
6	DF	(Brazil)	Wenderson Tsunami	30	EU	(Turkey) Iğdır	Transfer	Winter	150 000 €	
7	FW	(Brazil)	Fábio Lima	29	Non-EU	(Brazil) Juventude	Released	Winter	Free	
9	FW	(Bulgaria)	Aleksandar Kolev	32	EU	(China) Nantong Zhiyun	Released	Summer	Free	
11	MF	(Spain)	Jawad El Jemili	22	EU	(Qatar) Al Shahaniya	Transfer	Summer	260 000 €	
14	MF	(Bulgaria)	Iliyan Stefanov	26	EU	(Bulgaria) Slavia Sofia	Released	Summer	Free	
23	MF	(Slovakia)	Patrik Myslovič	24	EU	(Albania) Tirana	Released	Winter	Free	
44	GK	(Croatia)	Matej Marković	28	EU	(Croatia) Vukovar 1991	Released	Summer	Free	
77	FW	(Bulgaria)	Borislav Rupanov	21	EU	(Poland) Górnik Zabrze	Transfer	Winter	300 000 €	
88	FW	(Bulgaria)	Marin Petkov	22	EU	(Saudi Arabia) Al Taawoun	Transfer	Winter	800 000 €	
97	MF	(France)	Hassimi Fadiga	28	EU	(Kuwait) Al-Arabi	End of contract	Summer	Free	
	MF	(Bulgaria)	Asen Chandarov	26	EU	(Bulgaria) Cherno More	Released	Summer	Free	
	MF	(Nigeria)	Clement Ikenna	22	Non-EU	(Libya) Al Ittihad	Released	Summer	Free	
	MF	(Bulgaria)	Antoan Stoyanov	20	EU	(Bulgaria) Botev Vratsa	Released	Summer	Free	

=== Loans out ===
No.	Pos.	Nat.	Name	Age	EU	Moving to	Type	Transfer window	Transfer fee	Source
	FW	(Bulgaria)	Preslav Bachev	19	EU	(Bulgaria) Dunav Ruse		Summer		

== Squad ==
Updated on 10 March 2026.

No.	Name	Nationality	Position(s)	Age	EU	Ends	Signed from	Transfer fee	Notes
Goalkeepers
1	Ognyan Vladimirov	Bulgaria	GK	18	EU	2027	Youth system	W/S	
78	Martin Lukov	Bulgaria	GK	33	EU	2027	(Bulgaria) Lokomotiv Plovdiv	Free	Originally from Youth system
92	Svetoslav Vutsov	Bulgaria	GK	24	EU	2027	(Bulgaria) Slavia Sofia	Undisclosed	Originally from Youth system
Defenders
3	Maicon	Brazil	LB	26	Non-EU	2027	(Brazil) Nova Iguaçu	€250 000	
4	Christian Makoun	Venezuela	CB/LB/DM	26	EU	2027	(Cyprus) Anorthosis Famagusta	Free	Second nationality: Belgium
6	Stipe Vulikić	Croatia	CB	25	EU	2028	(Italy) Sampdoria	Undisclosed	
21	Aldair Neves	Portugal	RB	27	EU	2027	(Spain) Ponferradina	Undisclosed	
31	Nikola Serafimov	North Macedonia	CB	27	Non-EU	2028	(Hungary) Fehérvár	Free	
50	Kristian Dimitrov	Bulgaria	CB	29	EU	2028	(Croatia) Hajduk Split	Free	
71	Oliver Kamdem	Cameroon	RB	24	EU	2027	(Bulgaria) Lokomotiv Plovdiv	€75 000	Second nationality: France
Midfielders
8	Carlos Ohene	Ghana	DM	33	Non-EU	2026	(Bulgaria) Hebar	Undisclosed	
10	Asen Mitkov	Bulgaria	AM/CM	21	EU	2027	Youth system	W/S	
18	Gašper Trdin	Slovenia	DM/CB	28	EU	2027	(Slovenia) Bravo	Undisclosed	
22	Mazire Soula	France	AM/CM/LW	28	EU	2028	(Bulgaria) Cherno More	Free	Second nationality: Algeria
37	Rildo	Brazil	AM/LW/RW	26	Non-EU	2026	(Portugal) Santa Clara	Loan	
47	Akram Bouras	Algeria	CM/AM/DM	24	Non-EU	2028	(Algeria) MC Alger	€350 000	
70	Georgi Kostadinov	Bulgaria	DM	36	EU	2026	(Cyprus) APOEL	Free	
Forwards
9	Juan Perea	Colombia	CF	27	Non-EU	2028	(Bulgaria) Lokomotiv Plovdiv	Undisclosed	
11	Armstrong Oko-Flex	Ireland	LW/RW/CF	24	EU	2028	(Bulgaria) Botev Plovdiv	€300 000	Second nationality: England
12	Mustapha Sangaré	Mali	CF	27	EU	2027	(Portugal) Varzim	€175 000	Second nationality: France
17	Everton Bala	Brazil	RW/LW/SS	27	Non-EU	2027	(Brazil) Mirassol	Undisclosed	
45	Marko Dugandžić	Croatia	CF	32	EU	2026	(South Korea) Seoul	Free	
95	Karl Fabien	Martinique	RW/LW/CF	26	EU	2027	(Bulgaria) Slavia Sofia	Undisclosed	Second nationality: France
99	Radoslav Kirilov	Bulgaria	LW	34	EU	2027	(Bulgaria) CSKA 1948	Free	

== Performance overview ==
Competition	First match	Last match	Starting round	Final position	Record							
Competition	First match	Last match	Starting round	Final position	Pld	W	D	L	GF	GA	GD	Win %
First League	20 July 2025	25 May 2026	Matchday 1	Winners	36	25	6	5	71	25	+46	69.44
Bulgarian Cup	29 October 2025	11 February 2026	Round of 32	Quarter-finals	3	2	0	1	6	1	+5	66.67
Bulgarian Supercup	3 February 2026		Final	Runners-up	1	0	0	1	0	1	−1	0.00
UEFA Europa League	10 July 2025	31 July 2025	First qualifying round	Second qualifying round	4	0	3	1	1	2	−1	0.00
UEFA Conference League	7 August 2025	28 August 2025	Third qualifying round	Play-off round	4	2	0	2	4	6	−2	50.00
Total					48	29	9	10	82	35	+47	60.42

Source: Fixtures

== Fixtures ==
Win Draw Loss Upcoming fixture

=== Friendlies ===
==== Summer ====
21 June 2025	Levski Sofia	5–1	Spartak Pleven	Pravets
18:30 UTC+3	Everton 20' (pen.); Sangaré 28'; El Jemili 41'; Myslovič 59'; Rildo 60'	Report	V. Ivanov 48'	Stadium: Gradski; Referee: Stoyan Arsov (Sofia)

25 June 2025	Levski Sofia (Bulgaria)	1–0	(Serbia) Radnik Surdulica	Pravets
19:00 UTC+3	Everton 11'	Report		Stadium: Gradski; Referee: Stanimir Trenchev (Sofia)

29 June 2025	Levski Sofia	3–0	Montana	Pravets
19:00 UTC+3	Fábio Lima 50'; Myslovič 82'; Kirilov 86'	Report		Stadium: Gradski; Referee: Ivaylo Nenkov (Sofia)

3 July 2025	Levski Sofia	3–2	Beroe	Sofia
19:00 UTC+3	Kirilov 55', 79'; Rupanov 69'	Report	Algarra 23'; Salomoni 41'	Stadium: Georgi Asparuhov; Referee: Vasil Minev (Sofia)

==== Winter ====
13 January 2026	Levski Sofia (Bulgaria)	0–0	(Hungary) Nyíregyháza Spartacus	Antalya, Turkey
15:00 UTC+3		Report		Stadium: Bellis Sports Center

17 January 2026	Levski Sofia (Bulgaria)	1–2	(Serbia) Vojvodina	Belek, Turkey
16:00 UTC+3	Kostadinov 29'	Report	Vidosavljević 50'; Mladenović 74'	Stadium: Kaya Palazzo Sports Complex

21 January 2026	Levski Sofia (Bulgaria)	0–0	(Poland) Zagłębie Lubin	Belek, Turkey
16:00 UTC+3		Report		Stadium: Kaya Palazzo Sports Complex

25 January 2026	Levski Sofia (Bulgaria)	2–1	(Slovakia) Trenčín	Belek, Turkey
16:00 UTC+3	Oko-Flex 23'; Everton 45' (pen.)	Report	Kam 4'	Stadium: Kaya Palazzo Sports Complex

28 January 2026	Levski Sofia	3–1	Vihren	Sofia
15:00 UTC+2	Everton 9' (pen.); Fábio Lima 48'; Mitkov 76'	Report	Manolev 77'	Stadium: Georgi Asparuhov; Referee: Stoyan Arsov (Sofia)

=== First League ===
==== Regular season ====
===== League table =====
Pos	Team	Pld	W	D	L	GF	GA	GD	Pts	Qualification
1	Levski Sofia	30	22	4	4	64	22	+42	70	Qualification for the Championship group
2	Ludogorets	30	17	9	4	57	20	+37	60	Qualification for the Championship group
3	CSKA 1948	30	18	5	7	50	31	+19	59	Qualification for the Championship group
4	CSKA Sofia	30	16	8	6	43	23	+20	56	Qualification for the Championship group
5	Lokomotiv Plovdiv	30	11	13	6	30	33	−3	46	Qualification for the Conference League group

Source: Soccerway, Bulgarian Football
Rules for classification: 1) Points; 2) Head-to-head points; 3) Head-to-head goal difference; 4) Head-to-head goals scored; 5) Head-to-head away goals scored (only if two teams); 6) Goal difference; 7) Goals scored; 8) Fairplay ranking; 9) Draw

===== Results summary =====
Overall								Home						Away					
Pld	W	D	L	GF	GA	GD	Pts	W	D	L	GF	GA	GD	W	D	L	GF	GA	GD
30	22	4	4	64	22	+42	70	13	1	1	38	9	+29	9	3	3	26	13	+13

Last updated: 13 April 2026.
Source: bulgarian-football.com

===== Results by round =====
Round	1	2	3	4	5	6	7	8	9	10	11	12	13	14	15	16	17	18	19	20	21	22	23	24	25	26	27	28	29	30
Ground	H	A	H	H	A	A	H	A	H	A	H	A	H	A	H	A	H	A	A	H	H	A	H	A	H	A	H	A	H	A
Result	W	W	W	W	D	W	W	W	D	L	W	W	W	W	L	W	W	L	W	W	W	W	W	L	W	W	W	D	W	D
Position	1	1	1	2	2	2	2	1	1	2	1	1	1	1	1	1	1	1	1	1	1	1	1	1	1	1	1	1	1	1

Updated to match(es) played on 13 April 2026. Source: See Results
A = Away; H = Home; W = Win; D = Draw; L = Loss

===== Matches =====
The league fixtures were announced on 13 June 2025.

20 July 2025 1	Levski Sofia	5–0	Montana	Sofia
21:15 UTC+3	Kirilov 6'; Kostadinov (yellow card) 29'; Petkov 42' (pen.), 73'; Sangaré 58' (pen.); Dinev 61' (o.g.)	Report	Azevedo (yellow card) 53'; Kokonov (penalty missed) 67'; Iliev (yellow card) 72'	Stadium: Georgi Asparuhov; Attendance: 8,000; Referee: Radoslav Gidzhenov (Plovdiv); Man of the Match: Marin Petkov

27 July 2025 2	Septemvri Sofia	1–2	Levski Sofia	Sofia
21:15 UTC+3	Fourrier 44'; Serber (yellow card) 61'; Ochayi (yellow card) 89'	Report	Kamdem (yellow card) 61'; Kirilov 69'; Sangaré 82' (pen.); Maicon (yellow card) 89'; Mitkov (yellow card) 90+1'	Stadium: Lokomotiv (Note: Septemvri host their matches at Stadion Lokomotiv, Sofia, as their own venue, Stadion Dragalevtsi, Sofia, does not meet BFU requirements.); Attendance: 1,500; Referee: Stanimir Trenchev (Sofia); Man of the Match: Radoslav Kirilov

3 August 2025 3	Levski Sofia	2–0	Slavia Sofia	Sofia
21:15 UTC+3	Kamdem (yellow card) 28'; Fábio Lima (yellow card) 36'; Rupanov 70'; Maicon (yellow card) 73'; Everton 84'	Report	Stoev (yellow card) 35'; Dosso (yellow card) 56'; Marin (yellow card) 79'	Stadium: Georgi Asparuhov; Attendance: 7,800; Referee: Nikola Popov (Sofia); Man of the Match: Borislav Rupanov

10 August 2025 4	Levski Sofia	2–1	Spartak Varna	Sofia
19:00 UTC+3	Petkov 4'; Rupanov 45'; Mitkov (yellow card) 54'	Report	Lozev (yellow card) 26'; Ivanov (yellow card) 46', (goal) 86'	Stadium: Georgi Asparuhov; Attendance: 7,000; Referee: Vasil Minev (Sofia); Man of the Match: Mazire Soula

17 August 2025 5	Botev Vratsa	0–0	Levski Sofia	Vratsa
21:15 UTC+3	Naydenov (yellow card) 45+3'; Gallegos (yellow card) 48'; Smolenski (yellow card) 72'; Kabashi (yellow card) FT	Report	Mitkov (yellow card) 19'; Petkov (yellow card) FT	Stadium: Hristo Botev; Attendance: 4,200; Referee: Mariyan Grebencharski (Samokov); Man of the Match: Dimitar Evtimov

31 August 2025 7	Levski Sofia	2–1	CSKA 1948	Sofia
19:15 UTC+3	Dimitrov 8', (yellow card) 78'; Maicon 34'; Vutsov (yellow card) 89'	Report	Diallo 49'; Maciel (yellow card) 54'; Tsenov (yellow card) 64'	Stadium: Georgi Asparuhov; Attendance: 7,000; Referee: Krasen Georgiev (Varna); Man of the Match: Maicon

14 September 2025 8	Lokomotiv Sofia	1–2	Levski Sofia	Sofia
20:30 UTC+3	Raposo 57'; Bidounga (yellow card) 66'	Report	Everton 41'; Trdin (yellow card) 90+2'; Petkov 90+6', (yellow card) 90+8'; Maicon (yellow card) 90+11'	Stadium: Lokomotiv; Attendance: 2,800; Referee: Dragomir Draganov (Varna); Man of the Match: Radoslav Kirilov

19 September 2025 9	Levski Sofia	0–0	Ludogorets Razgrad	Sofia
20:30 UTC+3	Kostadinov (yellow card) 45+2'; Maicon (yellow card) 70'; Petkov (yellow card) 80'	Report	Kurtulus (yellow card) 16'; Kaloč (yellow card) 43'; Naressi (yellow card) 45+2'; Erick Marcus (yellow card) 71'; Stanić (yellow card) 88'	Stadium: Georgi Asparuhov; Attendance: 15,000; Referee: Radoslav Gidzhenov (Plovdiv); Man of the Match: Sergio Padt

26 September 2025 10	Lokomotiv Plovdiv	1–0	Levski Sofia	Plovdiv
20:00 UTC+3	Itu (yellow card) 15'; Ali (yellow card) 25'; Perea 33'; Ivanov (yellow card) 37'	Report	Sangaré (yellow card) 15'; Petkov (yellow card) 60'	Stadium: Lokomotiv; Attendance: 3,500; Referee: Volen Chinkov (Sofia); Man of the Match: Juan Perea

30 September 2025 6	Botev Plovdiv	0–1	Levski Sofia	Plovdiv
17:30 UTC+3	Yordanov (yellow card) 41'; Kwateng (yellow card) 71'	Report	Rildo (yellow card) 1'; Sangaré 75', (yellow card) 90+3'; Maicon (yellow card) 77'	Stadium: Hristo Botev; Attendance: 6,500; Referee: Valentin Zhelezov (Burgas); Man of the Match: Mustapha Sangaré
Note: Originally scheduled for August 2025, the match was postponed by the BFU due to Levski's participation in the UECL.

4 October 2025 11	Levski Sofia	3–1	Beroe	Sofia
20:15 UTC+3	Sangaré 11', (yellow card) 67'; Petkov 81'; Trdin 90+2'	Report	Sonha (red card) 50'; Salido 73'	Stadium: Georgi Asparuhov; Attendance: 3,600; Referee: Mariyan Grebencharski (Samokov); Man of the Match: Marin Petkov

19 October 2025 12	Cherno More	1–3	Levski Sofia	Varna
17:30 UTC+3	Celso Sidney 22'; Donchev (yellow card) 59'; Calcan (yellow card) 90+6'	Report	Sangaré 55', 65'; Vutsov (yellow card) 85'; Rupanov 90'	Stadium: Ticha; Attendance: 7,019; Referee: Vasil Minev (Sofia); Man of the Match: Mustapha Sangaré

25 October 2025 13	Levski Sofia	3–0	Dobrudzha	Sofia
18:00 UTC+3	Everton 13', 27'; Rupanov (yellow card) 32'; Kostadinov (yellow card) 53'; Petkov 73'; Makoun (yellow card) 90+2'	Report	Ivanov (yellow card) 38'; Leoni (yellow card) 85'	Stadium: Georgi Asparuhov; Attendance: 6,500; Referee: Gero Piskov (Sofia); Man of the Match: Everton Bala

2 November 2025 14	Arda	0–3	Levski Sofia	Kardzhali
15:15 UTC+2	Popov (yellow card) 29'; Karagaren (yellow card) 44'; Kotev (yellow card) 54'; Patrick Luan (yellow card) 60'	Report	Sangaré 19'; Maicon 50'; Bouras (yellow card) 78'; Viyachki 85' (o.g.); Trdin (yellow card) 90'	Stadium: Arena Arda; Attendance: 1,800; Referee: Dimitar Dimitrov (Sofia); Man of the Match: Georgi Kostadinov

8 November 2025 15	Levski Sofia	0–1	CSKA Sofia	Sofia
15:00 UTC+2	Petkov (yellow card) 58'; Kostadinov (yellow card) 58'; Dimitrov (yellow card) 63'; Vutsov (yellow card) 90+8'	Report	Dellova (yellow card) 11'; Eto'o (yellow card) 14', (goal) 76'; Martino (yellow card) 58'; Lapeña (yellow card) 58'; Jordão (yellow card) 69'; Pastor (red card) 90+2'; Skarsem (yellow card) 90+6'; Busatto (yellow card) 90+8'	Stadium: Vasil Levski National Stadium; Attendance: 20,000; Referee: Radoslav Gidzhenov (Plovdiv); Man of the Match: James Eto'o

23 November 2025 16	Montana	1–5	Levski Sofia	Montana
17:00 UTC+2	Tungarov (yellow card) 45+1'; Iliev (yellow card) 46'; Dimitrov 48', (yellow card) 73'	Report	Everton 11', 17'; Maicon 25'; Serafimov 45+2'; Sangaré 61' (pen.)	Stadium: Ogosta; Attendance: 3,000; Referee: Lyuboslav Lyubomirov (Pernik); Man of the Match: Everton Bala

30 November 2025 17	Levski Sofia	7–0	Septemvri Sofia	Sofia
17:30 UTC+2	Sangaré (yellow card) 28'; Ozornwafor 38' (o.g.); Soula 52', 69'; Everton 54'; Rildo (yellow card) 76', (goal) 80'; Petkov 84'; Makoun 88'	Report	Onasci (yellow card) 12' (yellow-red card) 45'; Ivanov (yellow card) 45+1'	Stadium: Georgi Asparuhov; Attendance: 3,800; Referee: Georgi Stoyanov (Plovdiv); Man of the Match: Mazire Soula

4 December 2025 18	Slavia Sofia	2–0	Levski Sofia	Sofia
18:00 UTC+2	Solet 21'; Serafimov 27' (o.g.); Ntumba (yellow card) 90+3'	Report	Petkov (yellow card) 74'; Soula (yellow card) 90+5'	Stadium: Aleksandar Shalamanov; Attendance: 3,500; Referee: Vasil Minev (Sofia); Man of the Match: Martin Georgiev

7 December 2025 19	Spartak Varna	1–3	Levski Sofia	Varna
17:00 UTC+2	Marinov (yellow card) 29'; Stojanovski 86'	Report	Everton 21', 45' (pen.); Maicon (yellow card) 50', (goal) 51'; Kostadinov (yellow card) 76'; Sangaré (yellow card) 77'	Stadium: Spartak; Attendance: 2,800; Referee: Valentin Zhelezov (Burgas); Man of the Match: Everton Bala

7 February 2026 20	Levski Sofia	3–1	Botev Vratsa	Sofia
17:30 UTC+2	Perea 46'; Maicon 51'; Oko-Flex 53'	Report	Malinov (yellow card) 25'; Petkov 58'	Stadium: Georgi Asparuhov; Attendance: 5,000; Referee: Nikola Popov (Sofia); Man of the Match: Armstrong Oko-Flex

15 February 2026 21	Levski Sofia	3–0	Botev Plovdiv	Sofia
17:00 UTC+2	Everton 37', 50' (pen.); Bouras (yellow card) 49', (goal) 54'	Report	Maraš (yellow card) 49'	Stadium: Georgi Asparuhov; Attendance: 5,600; Referee: Lyuboslav Lyubomirov (Pernik); Man of the Match: Everton Bala

22 February 2026 22	CSKA 1948	1–3	Levski Sofia	Bistritsa
16:45 UTC+2	Traoré (yellow card) 4' (yellow-red card) 34'; Martines 6'; Hoffmann (yellow card) 40'	Report	Soula 43'; Oko-Flex 58'; Perea 89'	Stadium: Bistritsa; Attendance: 350; Referee: Radoslav Gidzhenov (Plovdiv); Man of the Match: Maicon

1 March 2026 23	Levski Sofia	4–3	Lokomotiv Sofia	Sofia
17:15 UTC+2	Everton 3', 84' (pen.); Maicon (yellow card) 42'; Neychev 74' (o.g.); Sangaré 76'	Report	Aralica 26', (penalty missed) 62'; Ibe (yellow card) 35'; Daskalov (yellow card) 47'; Caruso 69', 90+3'	Stadium: Georgi Asparuhov; Attendance: 11,500; Referee: Martin Velikov (Varna); Man of the Match: Everton Bala

5 March 2026 24	Ludogorets Razgrad	1–0	Levski Sofia	Razgrad
18:30 UTC+2	Duarte (yellow card) 18'; Nedyalkov (yellow card) 42'; Duah (yellow card) 71'; Erick Marcus 80', (yellow card) 90+2'; Almeida (yellow card) 81'	Report	Trdin (yellow card) 32'; Aldair (yellow card) 34'; Bouras (yellow card) 42'; Kamdem (yellow card) 69'; Perea (red card) 80'	Stadium: Huvepharma Arena; Attendance: 4,800; Referee: Vasil Minev (Sofia); Man of the Match: Erick Marcus

9 March 2026 25	Levski Sofia	1–0	Lokomotiv Plovdiv	Sofia
18:00 UTC+2	Maicon (yellow card) 39'; Everton 89' (pen.); Vutsov (yellow card) 90+3'	Report	Chindriș (yellow card) 14'; Milosavljević (yellow card) 87'	Stadium: Georgi Asparuhov; Attendance: 5,300; Referee: Dimitar Dimitrov (Sofia); Man of the Match: Everton Bala

15 March 2026 26	Beroe	0–1	Levski Sofia	Stara Zagora
17:00 UTC+2	Sonha (yellow card) 29'; Pineda (yellow card) 60'; Costantini (yellow card) 90+4'	Report	Kostadinov 61'; Aldair (yellow card) 90+4'	Stadium: Beroe; Attendance: 5,278; Referee: Stanimir Trenchev (Sofia); Man of the Match: Georgi Kostadinov

21 March 2026 27	Levski Sofia	2–1	Cherno More	Sofia
17:30 UTC+2	Bouras (yellow card) 45'; Everton 53', (penalty missed) 67'; Tomov 67' (o.g.); Dimitrov (yellow card) 80'	Report	Chandarov (yellow card) 40', (goal) 90+4'; Donchev (yellow card) 59'; Panov (yellow card) 60'	Stadium: Georgi Asparuhov; Attendance: 11,000; Referee: Lyuboslav Lyubomirov (Pernik); Man of the Match: Akram Bouras

5 April 2026 28	Dobrudzha	2–2	Levski Sofia	Dobrich
19:30 UTC+3	Madaleno (yellow card) 45+1'; Ivanov 63'; Mihaylov 90+9'	Report	Trdin (yellow card) 27'; Ohene (yellow card) 56'; Maicon (yellow card) 85'; Dimitrov 88', 90+6', (yellow card) 90+8'	Stadium: Druzhba; Attendance: 6,000; Referee: Kristiyan Kolev (Plovdiv); Man of the Match: Ivaylo Mihaylov

9 April 2026 29	Levski Sofia	1–0	Arda	Sofia
20:30 UTC+3	Kostadinov (yellow card) 45+2'; Everton 64'	Report	Kotev (yellow card) 14' (yellow-red card) 36'; Velyev (yellow card) 83'	Stadium: Georgi Asparuhov; Attendance: 7,700; Referee: Radoslav Gidzhenov (Plovdiv); Man of the Match: Everton Bala

13 April 2026 30	CSKA Sofia	1–1	Levski Sofia	Sofia
16:00 UTC+3	Martino (yellow card) 59'; Godoy 90+4'	Report	Perea 71'; Bouras (yellow card) 78'	Stadium: Vasil Levski National Stadium; Attendance: 29,000; Referee: Mariyan Grebencharski (Samokov); Man of the Match: Santiago Godoy

==== Play-offs - Championship group ====
===== League table =====
Pos	Team	Pld	W	D	L	GF	GA	GD	Pts	Qualification
1	Levski Sofia (C)	36	25	6	5	71	25	+46	81	Qualification for the Champions League first qualifying round
2	CSKA 1948	36	20	7	9	54	35	+19	67 (Note: Head to head points: CSKA 1948 9, Ludogorets Razgrad 3.)	Qualification for the Conference League second qualifying round
3	Ludogorets (O)	36	19	10	7	61	25	+36	67	Qualification for the Conference League play-off
4	CSKA Sofia	36	18	9	9	47	30	+17	63	Qualification for the Europa League first qualifying round (Note: The winners of the 2025–26 Bulgarian Cup (CSKA Sofia) qualified for the Europa League first qualifying round.)

Source: soccerway, Bulgarian Football
Rules for classification: 1) Points; 2) Points in regular season and second phase; 3) Head-to-head points in regular season and second phase; 4) Head-to-head goal difference in regular season and second phase; 5) Head-to-head goals scored in regular season and second phase; 6) Head-to-head away goals scored in regular season and second phase (if two teams tied); 7) Goal difference; 8) Goals scored; 9) Fair play ranking; 10) Drawing of lots.
(C) Champions; (O) Play-off winners

===== Results summary =====
Overall								Home						Away					
Pld	W	D	L	GF	GA	GD	Pts	W	D	L	GF	GA	GD	W	D	L	GF	GA	GD
6	3	2	1	7	3	+4	11	2	0	1	3	1	+2	1	2	0	4	2	+2

Source: See results

===== Results by round =====
Round	1	2	3	4	5	6
Ground	A	H	H	A	H	A
Result	W	W	L	D	W	D
Position	1	1	1	1	1	1

Source: See Results
A = Away; H = Home; W = Win; D = Draw; L = Loss

===== Matches =====
25 April 2026 31	CSKA Sofia	1–3	Levski Sofia	Sofia
16:00 UTC+3	Makoun 11' (o.g.); Yordanov (yellow card) 35'; Brahimi (yellow card) 45+3'; Piedrahita (yellow card) 59'; Panayotov (yellow card) 84'	Report	Kamdem (yellow card) 35'; Everton 42'; Bouras 45'; Soula 80'	Stadium: Vasil Levski National Stadium; Attendance: 25,762; Referee: Vasil Minev (Sofia); Man of the Match: Akram Bouras

2 May 2026 32	Levski Sofia	1–0	CSKA 1948	Sofia
19:00 UTC+3	Dugandžić 71'; Kostadinov (yellow card) 73'	Report	Grivić (yellow card) 32'; Traoré (red card) 55'	Stadium: Georgi Asparuhov; Attendance: 18,278; Referee: Kristiyan Kolev (Plovdiv); Man of the Match: Marko Dugandžić

9 May 2026 33	Levski Sofia	0–1	Ludogorets Razgrad	Sofia
18:45 UTC+3	Dimitrov (yellow card) 44'; Bouras (yellow card) 49'; Kamdem (yellow card) 90+2'; Lukov (yellow card) 90+5'	Report	Tekpetey (yellow card) 28'; Chochev (yellow card) 47'; Stanić 89'	Stadium: Georgi Asparuhov; Attendance: 18,234; Referee: Ventsislav Mitrev (Sofia); Man of the Match: Petar Stanić

13 May 2026 34	Ludogorets Razgrad	1–1	Levski Sofia	Razgrad
20:15 UTC+3	Nachmias (yellow card) 37'; Duarte 81'	Report	Trdin (yellow card) 29'; Mitkov (yellow card) 38'; Soula (yellow card) 65'; Perea 67'; Aldair (yellow card) 70'; Maicon (yellow card) 71'	Stadium: Huvepharma Arena; Attendance: 3,000; Referee: Lyuboslav Lyubomirov (Pernik); Man of the Match: Juan Perea

16 May 2026 35	Levski Sofia	2–0	CSKA Sofia	Sofia
16:00 UTC+3	Perea 11'; Sangaré (yellow card) 53'; Everton 74' (pen.); Maicon (yellow card) 90+1'	Report	Ebong (yellow card) 53'; Pittas (yellow card) 63'; Panayotov (yellow card) 90+2'	Stadium: Vasil Levski National Stadium; Attendance: 15,500; Referee: Radoslav Gidzhenov (Plovdiv); Man of the Match: Juan Perea

25 May 2026 36	CSKA 1948	0–0	Levski Sofia	Bistritsa
20:30 UTC+3	Vitanov (yellow card) 43'; Iliev (yellow card) 90'; Marinov (yellow card) 90+6'	Report	Serafimov (yellow card) 68'; Maicon (yellow card) 69'	Stadium: Bistritsa; Attendance: 500; Referee: Gero Piskov (Sofia); Man of the Match: Georgi Kostadinov

=== Bulgarian Cup ===
29 October 2025 Round of 32	Hebar	0–3	Levski Sofia	Pazardzhik
16:30 UTC+2	Rusinov (yellow card) 31'; Dotsev (yellow card) 87'	Report	Serafimov 2'; Petkov 29'; Bouras 61'	Stadium: Georgi Benkovski; Attendance: 4,532; Referee: Lyuboslav Lyubomirov (Pernik)

11 December 2025 Round of 16	Levski Sofia	3–0	Vitosha Bistritsa	Sofia
17:30 UTC+2	Gyonov 11' (o.g.); Kirilov 51'; Petkov 64'; Kamdem (yellow card) 79'	Report	Zimbilev (yellow card) 52'	Stadium: Georgi Asparuhov; Attendance: 1,500; Referee: Kristiyan Kolev (Plovdiv)

11 February 2026 Quarter-final	Ludogorets Razgrad	1–0	Levski Sofia	Razgrad
18:00 UTC+2	Caio Vidal 7', (yellow card) 71'; Naressi (yellow card) 63'; Nedyalkov (yellow card) 65'	Report	Kamdem (yellow card) 1'; Dimitrov (yellow card) 55'; Serafimov (yellow card) 60'; Bouras (yellow card) 77'	Stadium: Huvepharma Arena; Attendance: 4,358; Referee: Volen Chinkov (Sofia)

=== Bulgarian Supercup ===
3 February 2026	Ludogorets Razgrad	1–0	Levski Sofia	Sofia
18:00 UTC+2	Stanić (yellow card) 19'; Duarte (yellow card) 34'; Erick Marcus (yellow card) 42'; Tekpetey 70'	Report	Maicon (yellow card) 44'; Kostadinov (yellow card) 50'; Makoun (yellow card) 82'; Fábio Lima (yellow card) 86'; Perea (yellow card) 90+1'	Stadium: Vasil Levski National Stadium; Attendance: 14,000; Referee: Mariyan Grebencharski (Samokov)

=== UEFA Europa League ===
==== First qualifying round ====
10 July 2025 1st leg	Levski Sofia (Bulgaria)	0–0	(Israel) Hapoel Be'er Sheva	Sofia, Bulgaria
20:30 UTC+3	Kostadinov (yellow card) 37'; Maicon (yellow card) 45+3' (yellow-red card) 70'	Report	Miguel Vítor (yellow card) 34'; Mizrahi (yellow card) 57'; Peretz (yellow card) 67' (yellow-red card) 90+5'; Ahmed (yellow card) 90+1'	Stadium: Georgi Asparuhov; Attendance: 15,467; Referee: Ladislav Szikszay (Czech Republic)

17 July 2025 2nd leg	Hapoel Be'er Sheva (Israel)	1–1 (a.e.t.) (1–1 agg.) (1–3 p)	(Bulgaria) Levski Sofia	Nyíregyháza, Hungary (Note: Due to the Gaza war, Israeli teams were required to play their home matches at neutral venues until further notice.)
20:00 UTC+2	Ventura (yellow card) 61' (yellow-red card) 109'; Kangwa (yellow card) 80'; Turgeman 105+3'; Miguel Vítor (yellow card) 111'	Report	Aldair (yellow card) 59'; Sangaré 114'	Stadium: Városi Stadion; Attendance: 721; Referee: Florian Badstübner (Germany)
	Penalties
	Almog (penalty missed); Kangwa (penalty missed); Turgeman (penalty missed); Levy (penalty scored)		(penalty missed) Rupanov; (penalty scored) Fabien; (penalty scored) Makoun; (penalty scored) Sangaré

==== Second qualifying round ====
24 July 2025 1st leg	Levski Sofia (Bulgaria)	0–0	(Portugal) Braga	Sofia, Bulgaria
20:30 UTC+3	Dimitrov (yellow card) 34'; Aldair (yellow card) 50'	Report	Lagerbielke (yellow card) 23'; Fran Navarro (yellow card) 43'; Oliveira (yellow card) 88'	Stadium: Georgi Asparuhov; Attendance: 16,040; Referee: Matteo Marchetti (Italy)

31 July 2025 2nd leg	Braga (Portugal)	1–0 (a.e.t.) (1–0 agg.)	(Bulgaria) Levski Sofia	Braga, Portugal
20:00 UTC+1	Fran Navarro 104'	Report	Petkov (yellow card) 58'; Makoun (yellow card) 77'; Sangaré (yellow card) 99'	Stadium: Estádio Municipal; Attendance: 16,771; Referee: Lothar D'hondt (Belgium)

=== UEFA Conference League ===
==== Third qualifying round ====
7 August 2025 1st leg	Levski Sofia (Bulgaria)	1–0	(Azerbaijan) Sabah	Sofia, Bulgaria
21:00 UTC+3	Rupanov 90+8'	Report	Lepinjica (yellow card) 18'; Mickels (yellow card) 21'; Šafranko (yellow card) 63'; Zedadka (yellow card) 90+3'	Stadium: Georgi Asparuhov; Attendance: 16,163; Referee: Duje Strukan (Croatia)

14 August 2025 2nd leg	Sabah (Azerbaijan)	0–2 (0–3 agg.)	(Bulgaria) Levski Sofia	Masazir, Azerbaijan
20:00 UTC+4	Solvet (yellow card) 19'; Parris (yellow card) 60'; Aliyev (yellow card) 79'	Report	Kirilov 40'; Soula 87'	Stadium: Bank Respublika Arena; Attendance: 6,606; Referee: Mykola Balakin (Ukraine)

==== Play-off round ====
21 August 2025 1st leg	Levski Sofia (Bulgaria)	0–2	(Netherlands) AZ	Sofia, Bulgaria
21:00 UTC+3	Rildo (yellow card) 24'; Dimitrov (yellow card) 90+5'	Report	Jensen (yellow card) 44'; Sadiq 56', (yellow card) 66'; Parrott 62'; Goes (yellow card) 90+5'	Stadium: Vasil Levski National Stadium (Note: Levski Sofia played their Conference League play-off round home match at the Vasil Levski National Stadium in Sofia, instead of their regular stadium, Stadion Georgi Asparuhov in Sofia.); Attendance: 29,930; Referee: Tamás Bognár (Hungary)

28 August 2025 2nd leg	AZ (Netherlands)	4–1 (6–1 agg.)	(Bulgaria) Levski Sofia	Alkmaar, Netherlands
19:30 UTC+2	Sadiq 3', 45+1'; Meerdink 6'; Clasie (yellow card) 9'; Zeefuik 86'	Report	Everton 47'; Rupanov (yellow card) 60'; Mitkov (yellow card) 66'; Sangaré (yellow card) 68'	Stadium: AFAS Stadion; Attendance: 12,612; Referee: Damian Sylwestrzak (Poland)

== Squad statistics ==
=== Appearances and goals ===
No.	Pos	Nat	Player	Total		First League		Bulgarian Cup		Bulgarian Supercup		Europa League		Conference League	
No.	Pos	Nat	Player	Apps	Goals	Apps	Goals	Apps	Goals	Apps	Goals	Apps	Goals	Apps	Goals
1	GK	(Bulgaria) BUL	Ognyan Vladimirov	1	0	1	0	0	0	0	0	0	0	0	0
3	DF	(Brazil) BRA	Maicon	43	5	29+4	5	1+1	0	1	0	3	0	4	0
4	DF	(Venezuela) VEN	Christian Makoun	32	1	22+2	1	0	0	1	0	4	0	3	0
6	DF	(Croatia) CRO	Stipe Vulikić	5	0	5	0	0	0	0	0	0	0	0	0
8	MF	(Ghana) GHA	Carlos Ohene	23	0	7+9	0	0+2	0	0	0	0+2	0	0+3	0
9	FW	(Colombia) COL	Juan Perea	16	5	6+8	5	0+1	0	0+1	0	0	0	0	0
10	MF	(Bulgaria) BUL	Asen Mitkov	28	0	9+14	0	0	0	0	0	0+1	0	4	0
11	FW	(Republic of Ireland) IRL	Armstrong Oko-Flex	19	2	14+3	2	0+1	0	1	0	0	0	0	0
12	FW	(Mali) MLI	Mustapha Sangaré	32	10	13+10	9	2	0	1	0	2+2	1	1+1	0
17	FW	(Brazil) BRA	Everton Bala	45	19	28+7	18	1	0	1	0	3+1	0	4	1
18	MF	(Slovenia) SLO	Gašper Trdin	43	1	21+10	1	3	0	0+1	0	3+1	0	4	0
21	DF	(Portugal) POR	Aldair Neves	34	0	18+5	0	1+2	0	0	0	4	0	4	0
22	MF	(France) FRA	Mazire Soula	42	5	23+11	4	1+2	0	0+1	0	0	0	0+4	1
31	DF	(North Macedonia) MKD	Nikola Serafimov	18	2	12+3	1	3	1	0	0	0	0	0	0
37	MF	(Brazil) BRA	Rildo	30	1	5+14	1	1+1	0	0+1	0	3+1	0	1+3	0
45	FW	(Croatia) CRO	Marko Dugandžić	6	1	1+5	1	0	0	0	0	0	0	0	0
47	MF	(Algeria) ALG	Akram Bouras	31	3	22+5	2	3	1	1	0	0	0	0	0
50	DF	(Bulgaria) BUL	Kristian Dimitrov	40	3	30	3	1	0	1	0	4	0	4	0
70	MF	(Bulgaria) BUL	Georgi Kostadinov	34	1	20+8	1	1	0	1	0	4	0	0	0
71	DF	(Cameroon) CMR	Oliver Kamdem	33	0	19+8	0	2	0	1	0	0+3	0	0	0
78	GK	(Bulgaria) BUL	Martin Lukov	4	0	1	0	3	0	0	0	0	0	0	0
92	GK	(Bulgaria) BUL	Svetoslav Vutsov	43	0	34	0	0	0	1	0	4	0	4	0
95	FW	(Martinique) MTQ	Karl Fabien	25	0	8+7	0	1+2	0	0	0	0+3	0	0+4	0
99	FW	(Bulgaria) BUL	Radoslav Kirilov	43	4	18+14	2	2	1	1	0	4	0	4	1
Players from the reserve team:
32	FW	(Bulgaria) BUL	Ivo Motev	1	0	0+1	0	0	0	0	0	0	0	0	0
Players who left during the season:
	DF	(Brazil) BRA	Wenderson Tsunami	15	0	8+1	0	2	0	0	0	1+1	0	1+1	0
	MF	(Slovakia) SVK	Patrik Myslovič	9	0	2+3	0	0+2	0	0	0	0+2	0	0	0
	FW	(Brazil) BRA	Fábio Lima	18	0	5+6	0	2	0	0+1	0	1+2	0	0+1	0
	FW	(Bulgaria) BUL	Marin Petkov	27	9	7+10	7	2	2	0	0	4	0	4	0
	FW	(Bulgaria) BUL	Borislav Rupanov	26	4	5+12	3	1+1	0	0	0	0+3	0	2+2	1

=== Goalscorers ===
Rank	Player	FPL	BC	BSC	UEL	UECL	Total
1	(Brazil) Everton Bala	18	0	0	0	1	19
2	(Mali) Mustapha Sangaré	9	0	0	1	0	10
3	(Bulgaria) Marin Petkov †	7	2	0	0	0	9
4	(Brazil) Maicon	5	0	0	0	0	5
4	(Colombia) Juan Perea	5	0	0	0	0	5
4	(France) Mazire Soula	4	0	0	0	1	5
7	(Bulgaria) Borislav Rupanov †	3	0	0	0	1	4
7	(Bulgaria) Radoslav Kirilov	2	1	0	0	1	4
9	(Bulgaria) Kristian Dimitrov	3	0	0	0	0	3
9	(Algeria) Akram Bouras	2	1	0	0	0	3
11	(Republic of Ireland) Armstrong Oko-Flex	2	0	0	0	0	2
11	(North Macedonia) Nikola Serafimov	1	1	0	0	0	2
13	(Croatia) Marko Dugandžić	1	0	0	0	0	1
13	(Bulgaria) Georgi Kostadinov	1	0	0	0	0	1
13	(Venezuela) Christian Makoun	1	0	0	0	0	1
13	(Brazil) Rildo	1	0	0	0	0	1
13	(Slovenia) Gašper Trdin	1	0	0	0	0	1
Own goal		5	1	0	0	0	6
Total		71	6	0	1	4	82

^{†} Player left during the season.

=== Clean sheets ===
Rank	Goalkeeper	FPL	BC	BSC	UEL	UECL	Total
1	(Bulgaria) Svetoslav Vutsov	14	0	0	2	2	18
2	(Bulgaria) Martin Lukov	0	2	0	0	0	2
3	(Bulgaria) Ognyan Vladimirov	1	0	0	0	0	1
Total		15	2	0	2	2	21

=== Disciplinary record ===
Includes all competitive matches.

N	P	Nat.	Name	First League			Bulgarian Cup			Bulgarian Supercup			Europa League			Conference League			Total			Notes
N	P	Nat.	Name	Yellow card	Second yellow card	Red card	Yellow card	Second yellow card	Red card	Yellow card	Second yellow card	Red card	Yellow card	Second yellow card	Red card	Yellow card	Second yellow card	Red card	Yellow card	Second yellow card	Red card	Notes
3	DF	(Brazil)	Maicon	12						1				1					13	1		
4	DF	(Venezuela)	Christian Makoun	1						1			1						3			
7	FW	(Brazil)	Fábio Lima †	1						1									2			
8	MF	(Ghana)	Carlos Ohene	1															1			
9	FW	(Colombia)	Juan Perea *	5		1				1									6		1	
10	MF	(Bulgaria)	Asen Mitkov	4												1			5			
11	FW	(Republic of Ireland)	Armstrong Oko-Flex *	1															1			
12	FW	(Mali)	Mustapha Sangaré	6									1			1			8			
18	MF	(Slovenia)	Gašper Trdin	5															5			
21	DF	(Portugal)	Aldair Neves	3									2						5			
22	MF	(France)	Mazire Soula	2															2			
31	DF	(North Macedonia)	Nikola Serafimov	1			1												2			
37	MF	(Brazil)	Rildo	2												1			3			
47	MF	(Algeria)	Akram Bouras	6			1												7			
50	DF	(Bulgaria)	Kristian Dimitrov	5			1						1			1			8			
70	MF	(Bulgaria)	Georgi Kostadinov	7						1			1						9			
71	DF	(Cameroon)	Oliver Kamdem	5			2												7			
77	FW	(Bulgaria)	Borislav Rupanov †	1												1			2			
78	GK	(Bulgaria)	Martin Lukov	1															1			
88	FW	(Bulgaria)	Marin Petkov †	6									1						7			
92	GK	(Bulgaria)	Svetoslav Vutsov	4															4			

Source: soccerway
Only competitive matches
Ordered by (red card) , (second yellow card) and (yellow card)
(yellow card) = Number of bookings; (second yellow card) = Number of sending offs after a second yellow card; (red card) = Number of sending offs by a direct red card. ^{*} Booked with other clubs. ^{†} Player left during the season.
