= 2025 Bulgarian Supercup =

Финал за Суперкупата на България 2025
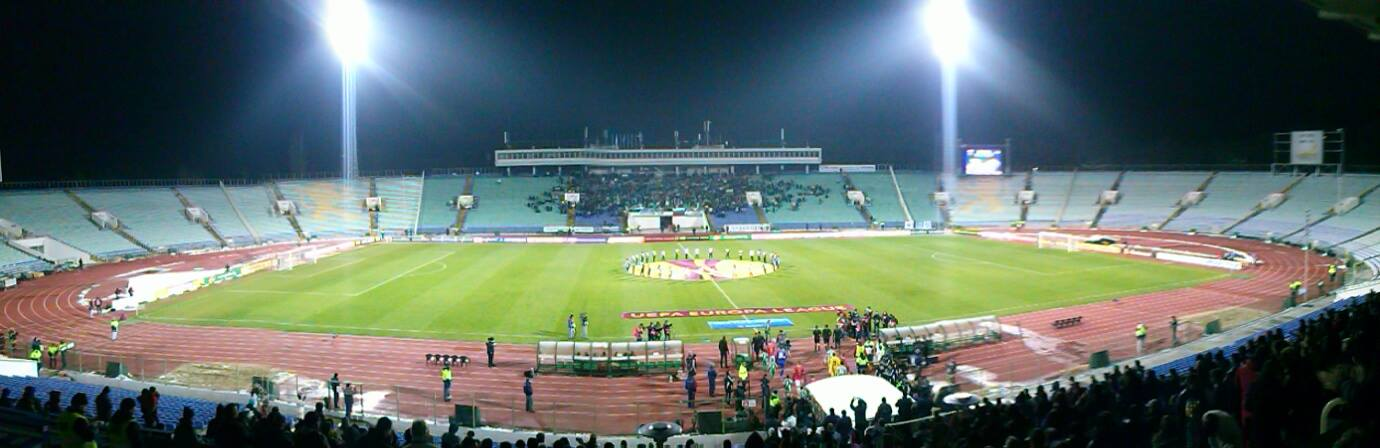
Ludogorets	Levski Sofia
First League	First League
1	0
- Date: 3 February 2026
- Venue: Vasil Levski, Sofia
- Referee: Mariyan Grebencharski (Samokov)
- Attendance: 14,000
- Weather: Fair; 0 °C (32 °F)

The 2025 Bulgarian Supercup was the 22nd edition of the Bulgarian Supercup, an annual football match played between the winners of the previous season's First League and the Bulgarian Cup. The game was played between the champions of the 2024–25 First League and 2024–25 Bulgarian Cup winners, Ludogorets Razgrad, and the 2024–25 First League runners-up, Levski Sofia.

This was Ludogorets' 13th Supercup appearance and Levski Sofia's 6th. Both teams already faced each other in the 2022 Supercup final, which Ludogorets won on penalties.

Initially supposed to be played in July 2025, the game has been rescheduled due to the participation of both teams in European competitions. On 5 November 2025, it has been announced that the game has been scheduled for 3 February 2026.

Ludogorets won the match 1–0 for their 9th Supercup title.

== Match details ==
3 February 2026
18:00 UTC+3

Ludogorets Razgrad	1–0	Levski Sofia
Tekpetey 70'	Report

Vasil Levski National Stadium, Sofia
Attendance: 14,000
Referee: Mariyan Grebencharski (Samokov)

Ludogorets	Levski

GK	1	(Netherlands) Sergio Padt
RB	17	(Spain) Son		(substituted off) 80'
CB	15	(Sweden) Edvin Kurtulus
CB	24	(Benin) Olivier Verdon
LB	3	(Bulgaria) Anton Nedyalkov (c)
CM	23	(Cape Verde) Deroy Duarte	(yellow card) 34'
CM	30	(Brazil) Pedro Naressi
RW	77	(Brazil) Erick Marcus	(yellow card) 42'	(substituted off) 68'
AM	14	(Serbia) Petar Stanić	(yellow card) 19'	(substituted off) 80'
LW	11	(Brazil) Caio Vidal
CF	9	(Switzerland) Kwadwo Duah		(substituted off) 68'
Substitutes:
GK	39	(Germany) Hendrik Bonmann
DF	2	(Sweden) Joel Andersson		(substituted on) 80'
DF	27	(Brazil) Vinícius Nogueira
DF	55	(Israel) Idan Nachmias
MF	18	(Bulgaria) Ivaylo Chochev		(substituted on) 80'
MF	26	(Czech Republic) Filip Kaloč
FW	12	(Brazil) Rwan Cruz		(substituted on) 68'
FW	37	(Ghana) Bernard Tekpetey		(substituted on) 68'
FW	99	(Bulgaria) Stanislav Ivanov
Manager:
(Norway) Per-Mathias Høgmo

GK	92	(Bulgaria) Svetoslav Vutsov
RB	71	(France) Oliver Kamdem
CB	4	(Venezuela) Christian Makoun	(yellow card) 82'
CB	50	(Bulgaria) Kristian Dimitrov
LB	3	(Brazil) Maicon	(yellow card) 44'
CM	47	(Algeria) Akram Bouras		(substituted off) 81'
CM	70	(Bulgaria) Georgi Kostadinov (c)	(yellow card) 50'	(substituted off) 74'
RW	99	(Bulgaria) Radoslav Kirilov		(substituted off) 74'
AM	17	(Brazil) Everton Bala		(substituted off) 81'
LW	11	(Republic of Ireland) Armstrong Oko-Flex		(substituted off) 68'
CF	12	(Mali) Mustapha Sangaré
Substitutes:
GK	78	(Bulgaria) Martin Lukov
DF	21	(Portugal) Aldair Neves
DF	31	(North Macedonia) Nikola Serafimov
MF	10	(Bulgaria) Asen Mitkov
MF	18	(Slovenia) Gašper Trdin		(substituted on) 74'
MF	22	(France) Mazire Soula		(substituted on) 68'
MF	37	(Brazil) Rildo		(substituted on) 81'
FW	7	(Brazil) Fábio Lima	(yellow card) 86'	(substituted on) 81'
FW	9	(Colombia) Juan Perea	(yellow card) 90+1'	(substituted on) 74'
Manager:
(Spain) Julio Velázquez

Match officials

- Assistant referees:
  - Martin Venev (Sofia)
  - Georgi Doynov (Veliko Tarnovo)
- Fourth official:
  - Lyuboslav Lyubomirov (Pernik)
- Video assistant referee:
  - Ventsislav Mitrev (Sofia)
- Assistant video assistant referee:
  - Kristiyan Kolev (Plovdiv)

Match rules

- 90 minutes.
- No overtime.
- Penalty shoot-out if scores still level.
- Seven named substitutes.
- Maximum of five substitutions. (Note: Each team was given only three opportunities to make substitutions excluding substitutions made at half-time.)
