= Sonha =

Sonha may refer to:

- Sonha language, an Indo-Aryan language
- Sonha Station, a railway station in North Korea
- Tijan Sonha (born 2001), Gambian footballer

== See also ==
- Sohna
