= Ivaylo Mihaylov =

Ivaylo Mihaylov may refer to:

- Ivaylo Mihaylov (footballer, born 1991)
- Ivaylo Mihaylov (footballer, born 2000)
