= Everton Bala =

Brazilian footballer

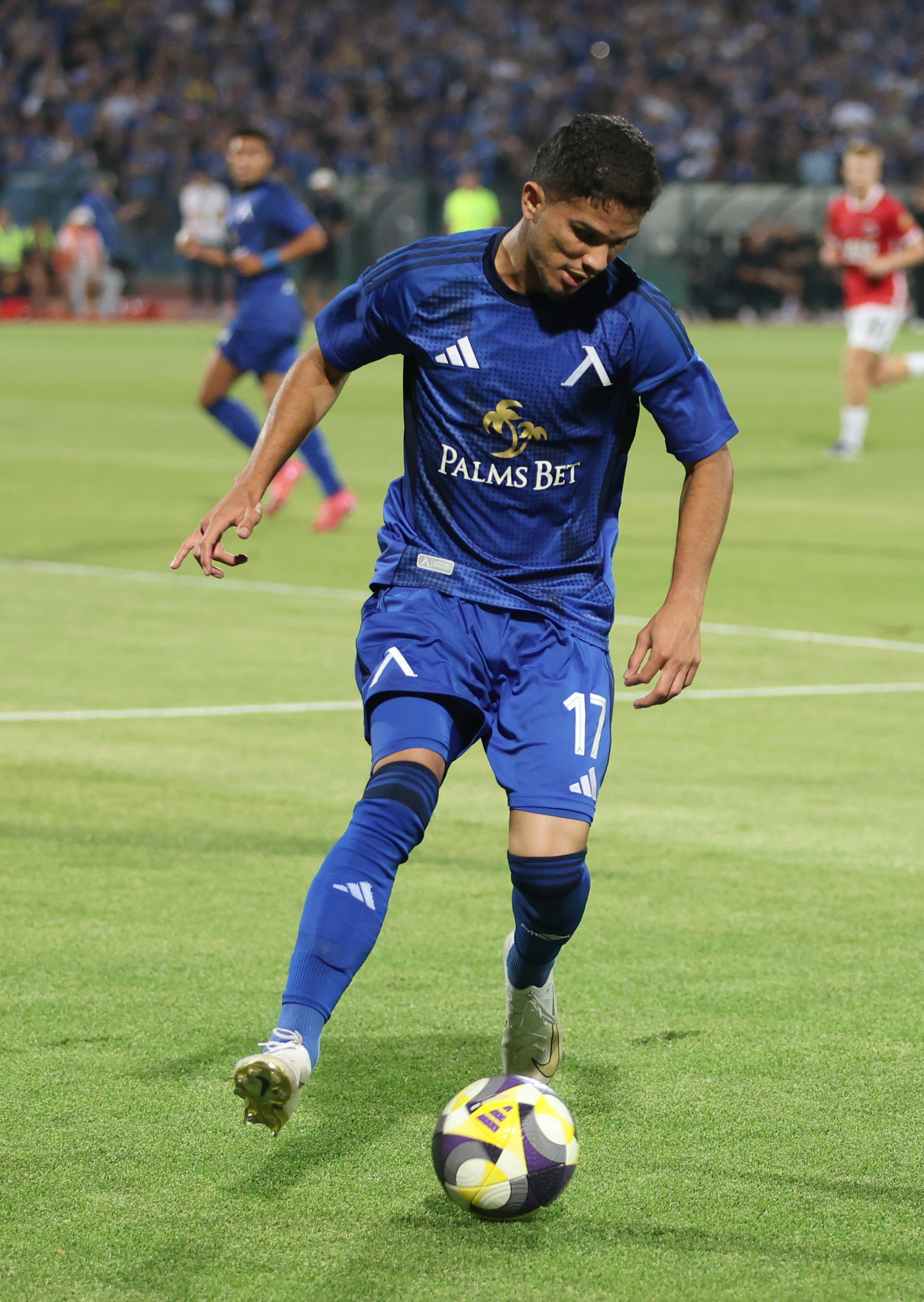

Personal information
- Full name: Francisco Everton Mota de Castro
- Date of birth: 3 January 1999 (age 27)
- Place of birth: Apuiarés, Brazil
- Height: 1.80 m (5 ft 11 in)
- Position: Winger

Team information
- Current team: Levski Sofia
- Number: 17

Youth career
- 2017: Aliança
- 2018: Porto-PE

Senior career*
Years	Team	Apps	(Gls)
2018–2022	Porto-PE	26	(8)
2018	→ Flamengo-PE (loan)	7	(1)
2020	→ Cianorte (loan)	7	(1)
2021	→ Vera Cruz (loan)	9	(2)
2021–2022	→ São José (loan)	29	(2)
2022–2025	Mirassol	17	(1)
2023	→ Brusque (loan)	40	(6)
2024	→ Levski Sofia (loan)	31	(2)
2025–	Levski Sofia	65	(24)
- * Club domestic league appearances and goals as of 22 November 2026

Francisco Everton Mota de Castro (born 3 January 1999), commonly known as Everton Bala, is a Brazilian professional footballer who plays as a winger for Bulgarian First League club Levski Sofia.

== Career ==
Everton began his career in Brazil's lower leagues with Porto-PE. On 3 May 2022, he signed with Mirassol in the Série C. On 1 February 2023, he was loaned to Brusque. After scoring 7 goals in 44 games for the club from Santa Catarina, Everton returned to Mirassol for the 2024 Série B season.

=== Levski Sofia ===
On 1 March 2024, Everton moved abroad for the first time, joining Levski Sofia in the Bulgarian First League, initially on loan from Mirassol until the end of the year with a buy option. He struggled to make an impact at the beginning of his tenure in the club, but nevertheless, his buy option was triggered and on 13 January 2025, he signed a permanent deal with Levski running until 2027.

Everton scored 10 goals in the first half of 2025–26 season, among which a goal against AZ in the UEFA Conference League, thus leading Levski's goalscoring chart for the season. On 9 April 2026, he scored his 24th goal for the club in a 1–0 win over Arda, thus becoming the highest-scoring Brazilian player in Levski's history. He finished the season as the joint top goalscorer in the league, having netted 18 goals, while Levski were crowned champions for the first time since 2009.

== Honours ==
Levski Sofia

- Bulgarian First League: 2025–26

Individual

- Bulgarian First League top goalscorer: 2025–26
