= Borislav Rupanov =

Bulgarian footballer (born 2004)

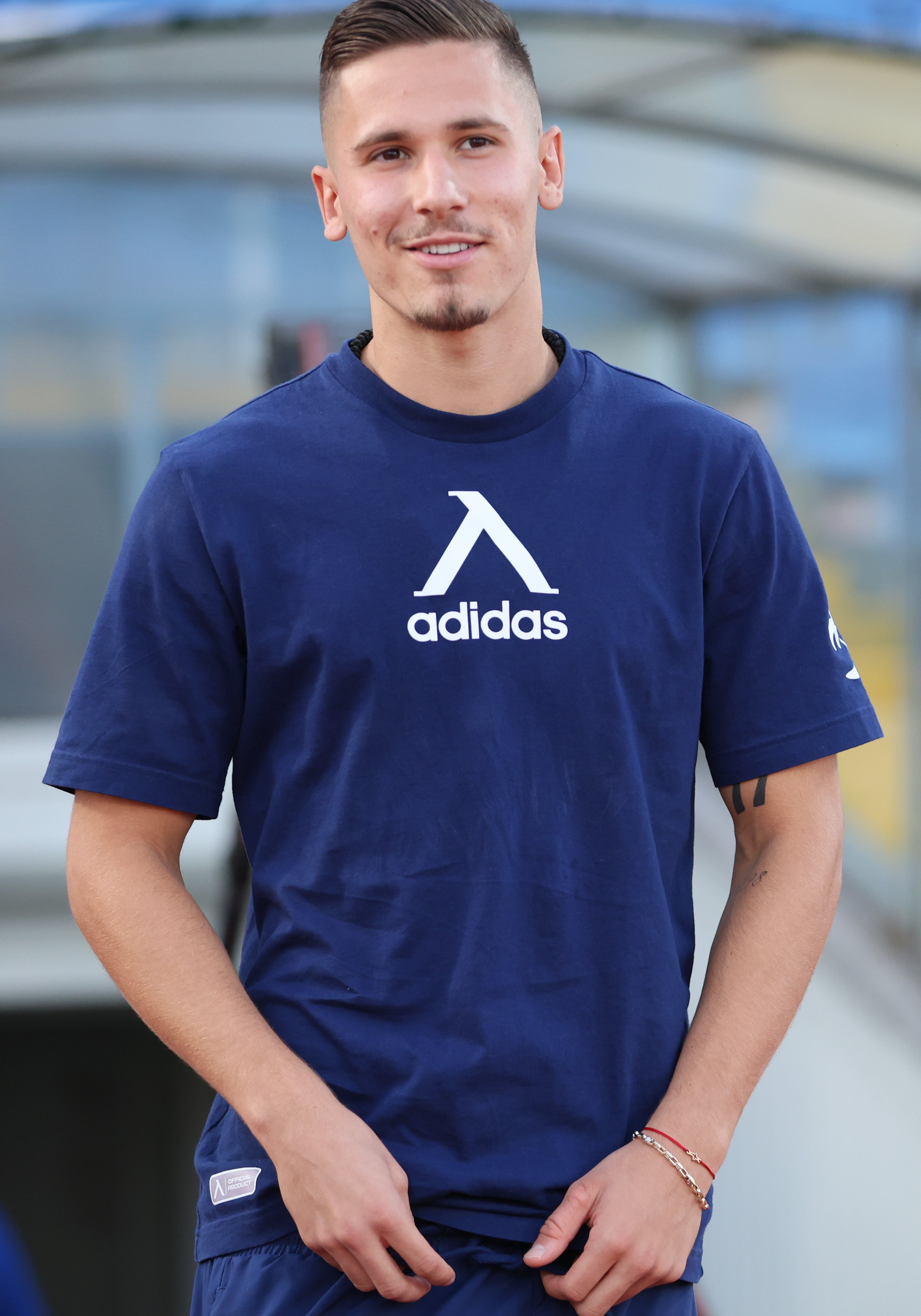
- Rupanov in 2025

Personal information
- Full name: Borislav Ivanov Rupanov
- Date of birth: 30 November 2004 (age 21)
- Place of birth: Petrich, Bulgaria
- Height: 1.88 m (6 ft 2 in)
- Position: Forward

Team information
- Current team: União Leiria (on loan from Górnik Zabrze)

Youth career
- Pirin Blagoevgrad
- Ludogorets Razgrad

Senior career*
| Years | Team | Apps | (Gls) |
| 2020–2022 | Ludogorets Razgrad III | 15 | (0) |
| 2022– | Levski Sofia II | 62 | (16) |
| 2022–2026 | Levski Sofia | 24 | (3) |
| 2024–2025 | → Septemvri Sofia (loan) | 31 | (12) |
| 2026– | Górnik Zabrze | 6 | (0) |
| 2026 | Górnik Zabrze II | 1 | (1) |
| 2026– | → União Leiria (loan) | 0 | (0) |

International career^{‡}
| 2022 | Bulgaria U19 | 4 | (0) |
| 2024– | Bulgaria U21 | 14 | (2) |
- * Club domestic league appearances and goals as of 19:01, 31 March 2026 (UTC) ‡ National team caps and goals as of 19:01, 31 March 2026 (UTC)

Borislav Ivanov Rupanov (Bulgarian: Борислав Иванов Рупанов; born 30 November 2004) is a Bulgarian professional footballer who plays as a forward for Liga Portugal 2 club União Leiria, on loan from Ekstraklasa club Górnik Zabrze.

== Career ==
Rupanov began his career in FA Vitosha 13, before moving to Pirin Blagoevgrad, and later joined Ludogorets Razgrad where he debuted in the third team. In 2022 he was transferred to Levski Sofia. In June 2024, he signed a new long-term contract with the team. On 26 August he was loaned to the fellow First League team Septemvri Sofia, until the end of the season. Following his strong performances for Septemvri Sofia, he returned to Levski Sofia for the new season. On 7 August 2025, Rupanov scored a last-minute goal in the first leg of a UEFA Conference League qualifying match against Sabah to help the Blues secure a 1–0 win.

On 15 January 2026, Rupanov signed for Ekstraklasa club Górnik Zabrze until June 2029, with a one-year extension option.

On 3 July 2026, he was sent on a season-long loan with an option to buy to Portuguese side União Leiria.

== Career statistics ==
As of match played 20 March 2026

Appearances and goals by club, season and competition
| Club | Season | League | | | National cup (Note: Includes Bulgarian Cup) | | Europe | | Other | | Total | |
| Club | Season | Division | Apps | Goals | Apps | Goals | Apps | Goals | Apps | Goals | Apps | Goals |
|---|---|---|---|---|---|---|---|---|---|---|---|---|
| Ludogorets Razgrad III | 2020–21 | Third League | 5 | 0 | — | | — | | — | | 5 | 0 |
| Ludogorets Razgrad III | 2021–22 | Third League | 10 | 0 | — | | — | | — | | 10 | 0 |
| Ludogorets Razgrad III | Total | | 15 | 0 | — | | — | | — | | 15 | 0 |
| Levski Sofia II | 2022–23 | Third League | 27 | 4 | — | | — | | — | | 27 | 4 |
| Levski Sofia II | 2023–24 | Third League | 31 | 11 | — | | — | | — | | 31 | 11 |
| Levski Sofia II | 2024–25 | Third League | 4 | 1 | — | | — | | — | | 4 | 1 |
| Levski Sofia II | Total | | 62 | 16 | — | | — | | — | | 62 | 16 |
| Levski Sofia | 2022–23 | First League | 6 | 0 | 1 | 0 | 0 | 0 | — | | 7 | 0 |
| Levski Sofia | 2023–24 | First League | 0 | 0 | 0 | 0 | 0 | 0 | — | | 0 | 0 |
| Levski Sofia | 2024–25 | First League | 1 | 0 | 0 | 0 | — | | — | | 1 | 0 |
| Levski Sofia | 2025–26 | First League | 17 | 3 | 1 | 0 | 7 (Note: Three appearances in UEFA Europa League, four appearances and one goal in UEFA Conference League) | 1 | — | | 25 | 4 |
| Levski Sofia | Total | | 24 | 3 | 2 | 0 | 7 | 1 | — | | 33 | 4 |
| Septemvri Sofia (loan) | 2024–25 | First League | 31 | 12 | 0 | 0 | — | | — | | 31 | 12 |
| Górnik Zabrze | 2025–26 | Ekstraklasa | 6 | 0 | 0 | 0 | — | | — | | 6 | 0 |
| Górnik Zabrze II | 2025–26 | III liga, group III | 1 | 1 | — | | — | | — | | 1 | 1 |
| União Leiria (loan) | 2026–27 | Liga Portugal 2 | 0 | 0 | 0 | 0 | — | | — | | 0 | 0 |
| Career total | | | 139 | 32 | 2 | 0 | 7 | 1 | 0 | 0 | 148 | 33 |
