= Bernard Tekpetey =

Ghanaian footballer

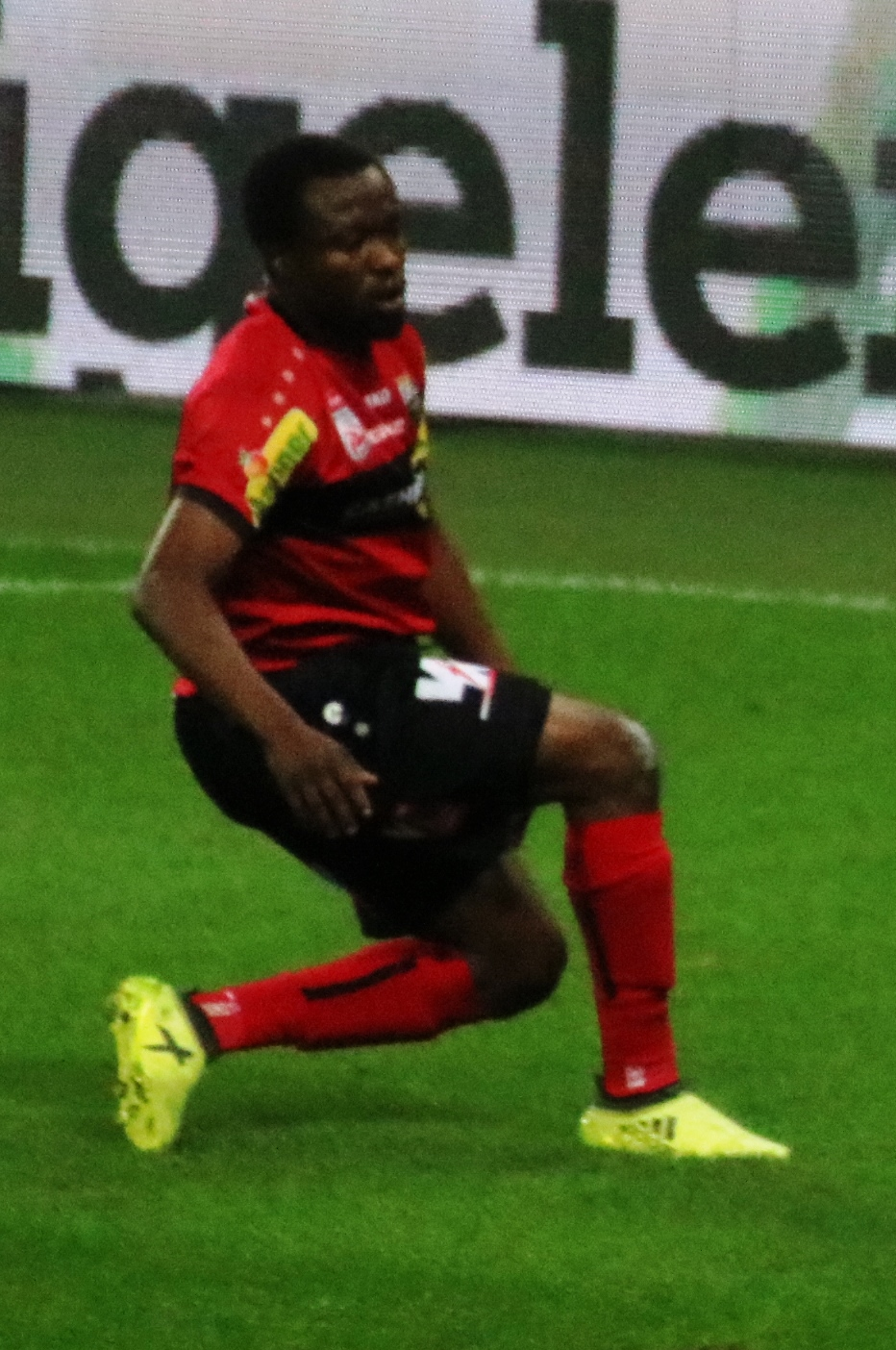
- Tekpetey in 2017

Personal information
- Date of birth: 3 September 1997 (age 29)
- Place of birth: Accra, Ghana
- Height: 1.72 m (5 ft 8 in)
- Position: Forward

Team information
- Current team: Ludogorets Razgrad
- Number: 37

Youth career
- 2012–2016: UniStar Soccer Academy

Senior career*
Years	Team	Apps	(Gls)
2016	Schalke 04 II	16	(4)
2016–2018	Schalke 04	2	(0)
2017	→ SCR Altach (loan)	10	(1)
2018–2019	SC Paderborn	32	(10)
2019–2021	Schalke 04	0	(0)
2019–2020	→ Fortuna Düsseldorf (loan)	9	(0)
2020–2021	→ Ludogorets Razgrad (loan)	25	(2)
2021–	Ludogorets Razgrad	118	(34)
2025–	Ludogorets Razgrad II	3	(0)

International career^{‡}
2017	Ghana	2	(0)
- * Club domestic league appearances and goals as of 9 September 2026 ‡ National team caps and goals as of 15 May 2024

Bernard Tekpetey (born 3 September 1997) is a Ghanaian professional footballer who plays as a forward for Bulgarian First League club Ludogorets Razgrad.

== Club career ==
Having successfully undergone a trial period, Schalke 04 signed Tekpetey was signed from Ghanaian second-tier side Unistar Soccer Academy in February 2016. He made his debut for the club on 24 November, starting in a 2–0 win over OGC Nice. He won a penalty, which was converted by Dennis Aogo for Schalke's second goal, before being sent off in the second-half after committing two bookable offences.

After a season-long loan to Ludogorets Razgrad, Tekpetey permanently joined the team on 29 June 2021. He established himself as an undisputed starter for the team, becoming a key player and a reliable goalscorer. In May 2024, Tekpetey was handed a four-match ban following a red card received in an ill-tempered match against CSKA Sofia, which saw him miss the remaining matches of the season. In August 2024, he suffered a broken foot in the first leg of the Champions League qualifying match against Azerbaijani team Qarabagh and after undergoing a successful operation in Austria, was expected to be sidelined until the end of 2024. Reportedly, at the time the player was close to finalizing a transfer to Parma, which fell through due to the incident. On 2 April 2025, Tekpetey returned to action after his recovery from injury, coming on as substitute during the second half of the Ludogorets reserve side's 2–0 win over Nesebar. On 3 February 2026, he scored the only goal in a 1–0 win over Levski Sofia in the Bulgarian Supercup.

== International career ==
Tekpetey was called up to the Ghana national team for the 2017 Africa Cup of Nations. He made his debut for Ghana in a 1–0 loss to Egypt on 25 January 2017.

In June 2022, Tekpetey got Bulgarian pasport. In June 2025 he hinted, that since he lived for 5 years in Bulgaria and having a passport, he is available and would consider to play for Bulgaria national team due to FIFA rules changes in 2021, which allows players with less than 3 matches for national team to switch.

== Career statistics ==
=== Club ===
As of match played on 9 September 2026

Appearances and goals by club, season and competition
Club	Season	League			Cup		Europe		Total	
Club	Season	League	Apps	Goals	Apps	Goals	Apps	Goals	Apps	Goals
Schalke 04 II	2015–16	Regionalliga West	16	4	—		—		16	4
Schalke 04	2016–17	Bundesliga	2	0	0	0	1 (Note: Appearances in UEFA Europa League)	0	3	0
Schalke 04	2017–18	Bundesliga	0	0	0	0	—		0	0
Schalke 04	Total		2	0	0	0	1	0	3	0
SCR Altach (loan)	2017–18	Austrian Bundesliga	10	1	2	2	—		12	3
SC Paderborn	2018–19	2. Bundesliga	32	10	4	1	—		36	11
Fortuna Düsseldorf (loan)	2019–20	Bundesliga	9	0	1	0	—		10	0
Ludogorets Razgrad (loan)	2020–21	Bulgarian First League	25	2	3	2	9 (Note: Two appearances in UEFA Champions League, seven appearances in UEFA Europa League)	0	37	4
Ludogorets Razgrad	2021–22	Bulgarian First League	24	10	4	0	9 (Note: Five appearances in UEFA Champions League, four appearances in UEFA Europa League)	0	37	10
Ludogorets Razgrad	2022–23	Bulgarian First League	27	8	6	1	15 (Note: Five appearances and one goal in UEFA Champions League, eight appearances in UEFA Europa League, two appearances in UEFA Europa Conference League)	1	48	10
Ludogorets Razgrad	2023–24	Bulgarian First League	30	10	4	1	15 (Note: Three appearances and two goals in UEFA Champions League, four appearances and two goals in UEFA Europa League, Eight appearances in UEFA Europa Conference League)	4	49	15
Ludogorets Razgrad	2024–25	Bulgarian First League	2	1	0	0	5 (Note: Appearances in UEFA Champions League)	2	7	3
Ludogorets Razgrad	2025–26	Bulgarian First League	29	3	4	1	14 (Note: Six appearances in UEFA Champions League, eight appearances and one goal in UEFA Europa League)	1	47	5
Ludogorets Razgrad	2026–27	Bulgarian First League	6	2	0	0	2 (Note: Two appearances and one goal in UEFA Europa Conference League)	1	8	3
Ludogorets Razgrad	Ludogorets Total		143	36	21	5	69	9	233	50
Career total			212	51	28	8	70	9	310	68

=== International ===
As of 17 September 2017

Appearances and goals by national team and year
National team	Year	Apps	Goals
Ghana	2017	2	0
Total		2	0

== Honours ==
Ludogorets Razgrad

- Bulgarian First League: (5) 2020–21, 2021–22, 2022–23, 2023–24, 2024–25
- Bulgarian Supercup: (5) 2021, 2022, 2023, 2024, 2025
- Bulgarian Cup: (2) 2022–23, 2024–25

Individual

- Bulgarian football Best foreign player: 2022
- Bulgarian First League Goal of the Week: 2021–22 (Week 2) (vs CSKA 1948), (Week 27) (vs Slavia Sofia)
