= Tsvetoslav Marinov =

Bulgarian footballer (born 2005)

Personal information
- Full name: Tsvetoslav Mihaylov Marinov
- Date of birth: 4 August 2005 (age 21)
- Place of birth: Lovech, Bulgaria
- Position: Defensive midfielder

Team information
- Current team: Spartak Varna
- Number: 17

Youth career
- 2012–2020: Litex Lovech
- 2020–2022: Spartak Varna

Senior career*
Years	Team	Apps	(Gls)
2022–2024	Spartak Varna II	31	(6)
2023–	Spartak Varna	35	(0)
2023	→ Dorostol Silistra (loan)	9	(1)
2025	→ Lovech (loan)	14	(0)

International career^{‡}
2025–	Bulgaria U21	4	(0)
- * Club domestic league appearances and goals as of 1 June 2026 ‡ National team caps and goals as of 21:14, 16 October 2025 (UTC)

Tsvetoslav Mihaylov Marinov (Bulgarian: Цветослав Михайлов Маринов; born 4 August 2005) is a Bulgarian professional footballer who plays as a midfielder for Spartak Varna.

== Career ==
Marinov began his youth career at Litex Lovech, before joining the academy at Spartak Varna in 2020.

On 3 September 2024, Marinov signed his first professional contract with Spartak. In January 2025, he was loaned to Second League club FC Lovech until the end of the season. Marinov featured regularly for Lovech during the second half of 2024–25 season, playing 14 matches for the team, who were relegated to Third League.

Marinov began to establish himself in the Spartak first team from the 2025–26 season. On 28 November 2025, he signed a new contract with Spartak, keeping him at the club until 2028.
