= Ivaylo Mihaylov (footballer, born 2000) =

Bulgarian footballer

Personal information
- Full name: Ivaylo Nikolaev Mihaylov
- Date of birth: 28 July 2000 (age 26)
- Place of birth: Blagoevgrad, Bulgaria
- Height: 1.91 m (6 ft 3 in)
- Position: Forward

Team information
- Current team: Hebar
- Number: 98

Youth career
- –2018: Pirin Blagoevgrad

Senior career*
Years	Team	Apps	(Gls)
2018–2020	Pirin Blagoevgrad	28	(4)
2020–2021	→ Septemvri Simitli (loan)	25	(3)
2021–2023	Hebar	51	(7)
2023–2024	Septemvri Sofia	35	(2)
2024–2026	Dobrudzha	64	(19)
2026–	Hebar	8	(5)
- * Club domestic league appearances and goals as of 20:40, 11 September 2026 (UTC)

Ivaylo Nikolaev Mihaylov (born 28 July 2000) is a Bulgarian professional footballer who plays as a forward for Second League club Hebar Pazardzhik.

== Club career ==
Mihaylov spent his youth years at the academy of Pirin Blagoevgrad. On 28 April 2018, he made his debut for the team against Pirin Blagoevgrad.

In June 2021, he joined Hebar Pazardzhik.
