= Gašper Trdin =

Slovenian footballer

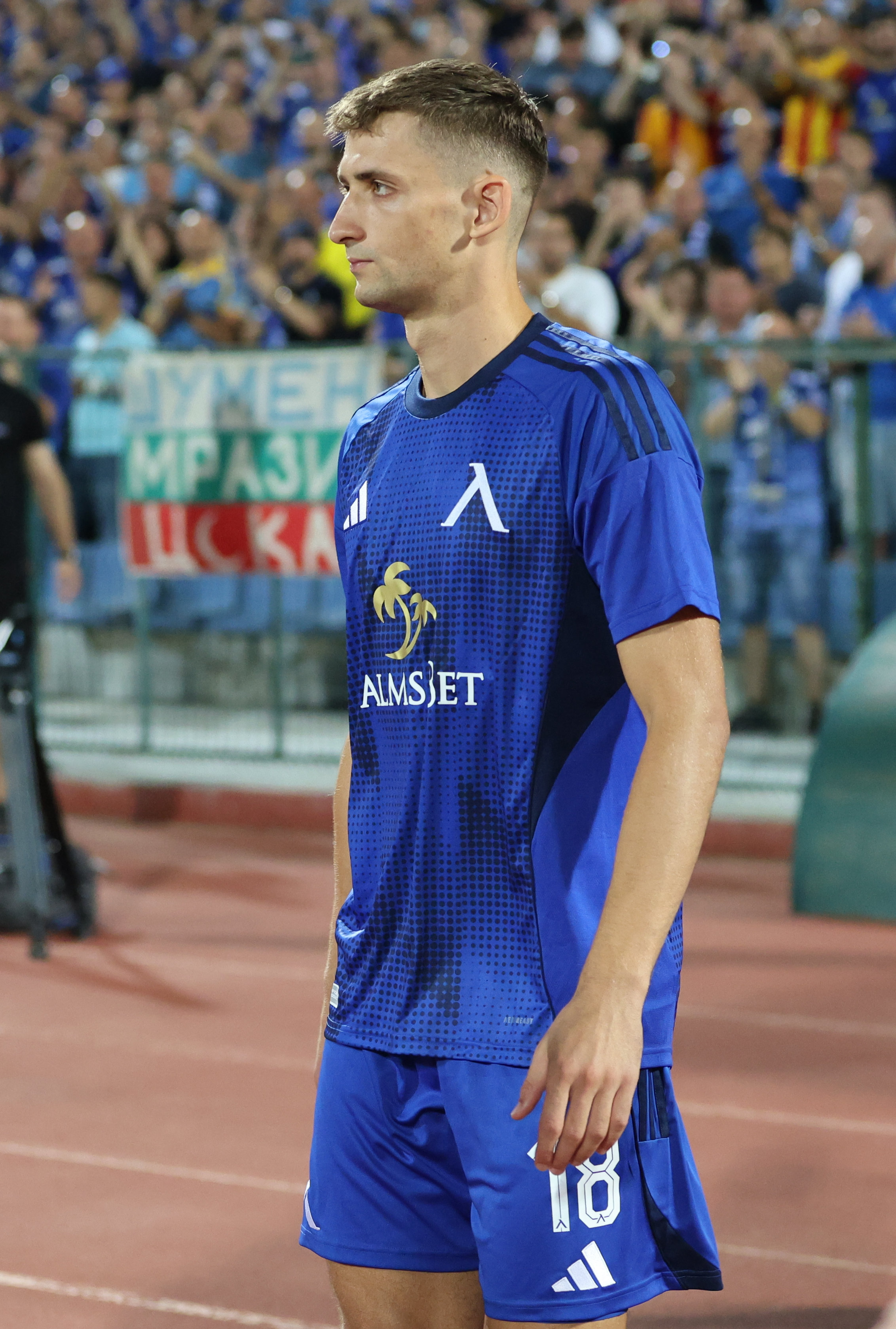

Personal information
- Date of birth: 28 March 1998 (age 28)
- Place of birth: Ljubljana, Slovenia
- Height: 1.87 m (6 ft 2 in)
- Position: Defensive midfielder

Team information
- Current team: Levski Sofia
- Number: 18

Youth career
- Radomlje

Senior career*
| Years | Team | Apps | (Gls) |
| 2017–2021 | Radomlje | 86 | (5) |
| 2021–2025 | Bravo | 112 | (8) |
| 2025– | Levski Sofia | 50 | (1) |
- * Club domestic league appearances and goals as of 15:26, 22 November 2026 (UTC)

Gašper Trdin (born 28 March 1998) is a Slovenian professional footballer who plays as a defensive midfielder for Bulgarian First League club Levski Sofia.

== Career ==
A youth product of Radomlje, Trdin debuted for the senior team in 2017. He spent four years with the club in the Slovenian Second League before departing in 2021 to PrvaLiga club NK Bravo. He established himself as an undisputed starter and later a captain of the team.

On 13 February 2025, Trdin moved abroad, signing a two-and-a-half year deal with Bulgarian First League club Levski Sofia.

== Career statistics ==
As of 25 October 2025

Appearances and goals by club, season and competition
| Club | Season | League | | | National cup (Note: Includes Slovenian Cup, Bulgarian Cup) | | Continental | | Other | | Total | |
| Club | Season | Division | Apps | Goals | Apps | Goals | Apps | Goals | Apps | Goals | Apps | Goals |
|---|---|---|---|---|---|---|---|---|---|---|---|---|
| Radomlje | 2017–18 | 2. SNL | 22 | 1 | 2 | 1 | — | | — | | 24 | 2 |
| Radomlje | 2018–19 | 2. SNL | 28 | 3 | 0 | 0 | — | | — | | 28 | 3 |
| Radomlje | 2019–20 | 2. SNL | 18 | 0 | 3 | 0 | — | | — | | 21 | 0 |
| Radomlje | 2020–21 | 2. SNL | 18 | 1 | 2 | 0 | — | | — | | 20 | 1 |
| Radomlje | Total | | 86 | 5 | 7 | 1 | — | | — | | 93 | 6 |
| Bravo | 2021–22 | Slovenian PrvaLiga | 27 | 1 | 2 | 0 | — | | — | | 29 | 1 |
| Bravo | 2022–23 | Slovenian PrvaLiga | 33 | 0 | 2 | 0 | — | | — | | 35 | 0 |
| Bravo | 2023–24 | Slovenian PrvaLiga | 32 | 4 | 0 | 0 | — | | — | | 32 | 4 |
| Bravo | 2024–25 | Slovenian PrvaLiga | 20 | 3 | 1 | 0 | 4 (Note: Appearances in UEFA Conference League) | 0 | — | | 25 | 3 |
| Bravo | Total | | 112 | 8 | 5 | 0 | 4 | 0 | — | | 121 | 8 |
| Levski Sofia | 2024–25 | Bulgarian First League | 8 | 0 | 1 | 0 | — | | — | | 9 | 0 |
| Levski Sofia | 2025–26 | Bulgarian First League | 11 | 1 | 0 | 0 | 8 (Note: Four appearances in UEFA Europa League, four appearances in UEFA Conference League) | 0 | — | | 19 | 1 |
| Career total | | | 217 | 14 | 13 | 1 | 12 | 0 | — | | 242 | 15 |

== Honours ==
Levski Sofia

- Bulgarian First League: 2025–26
