= Mazire Soula =

French footballer (born 1998)

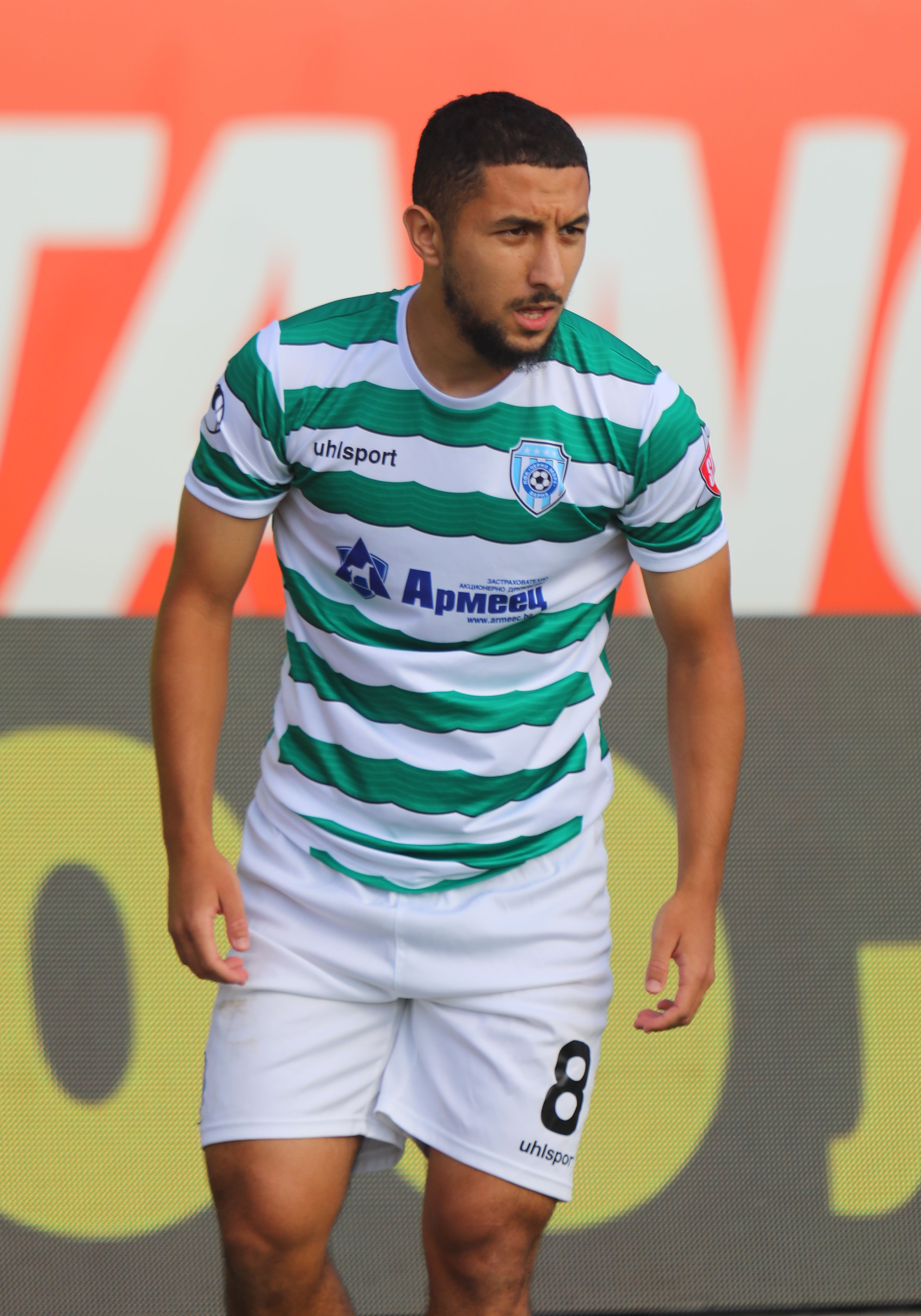
- Soula with Cherno More in 2022

Personal information
- Date of birth: 6 June 1998 (age 28)
- Place of birth: Rouen, France
- Height: 1.72 m (5 ft 8 in)
- Position: Attacking midfielder

Team information
- Current team: Levski Sofia
- Number: 22

Youth career
- 2005–2017: Le Havre

Senior career*
Years	Team	Apps	(Gls)
2016–2018	Le Havre	1	(0)
2016–2018	Le Havre II	44	(3)
2018–2020	Angers	0	(0)
2018–2020	Angers II	34	(4)
2020–2021	USM Alger	24	(2)
2022–2025	Cherno More	100	(11)
2025–	Levski Sofia	46	(4)
- * Club domestic league appearances and goals as of 22 November 2026

Mazire Soula (born 6 June 1998) is a French professional footballer who plays as an attacking midfielder for Bulgarian First League club Levski Sofia.

== Career ==
In 2020, Soula signed a contract with USM Alger.

In December 2021, Soula signed a two-year contract with Bulgarian First League club Cherno More Varna. He made his competitive debut for the club against Ludogorets Razgrad on 20 February 2022. On 8 August 2023, Soula signed a new contract extension to stay with Cherno More until the summer of 2025. He left the club after his contract expired at the end of the 2024–25 season.

On 23 July 2025, Soula signed for fellow Bulgarian First League club Levski Sofia on a three-year contract.

== Career statistics ==
As of 10 August 2025

Appearances and goals by club, season and competition
Club	Season	League			National cup (Note: Includes Algerian Cup, Bulgarian Cup)		Continental		Other		Total	
Club	Season	Division	Apps	Goals	Apps	Goals	Apps	Goals	Apps	Goals	Apps	Goals
USM Alger	2020–21	Ligue 1	24	2	1	0	—		—		25	2
Cherno More	2021–22	First League	11	0	0	0	—		—		11	0
Cherno More	2022–23	First League	29	2	3	1	—		—		32	3
Cherno More	2023–24	First League	30	2	0	0	—		—		30	2
Cherno More	2024–25	First League	30	7	4	0	2 (Note: Appearances in UEFA Conference League)	0	—		36	7
Cherno More	Total		100	11	7	1	2	0	0	0	109	12
Levski Sofia	2025–26	First League	13	0	1	0	4	1	—		18	1
Career total			137	13	9	1	6	1	0	0	152	15

== Honours ==
Levski Sofia

- Bulgarian First League: 2025–26
