= Asen Mitkov =

Bulgarian footballer

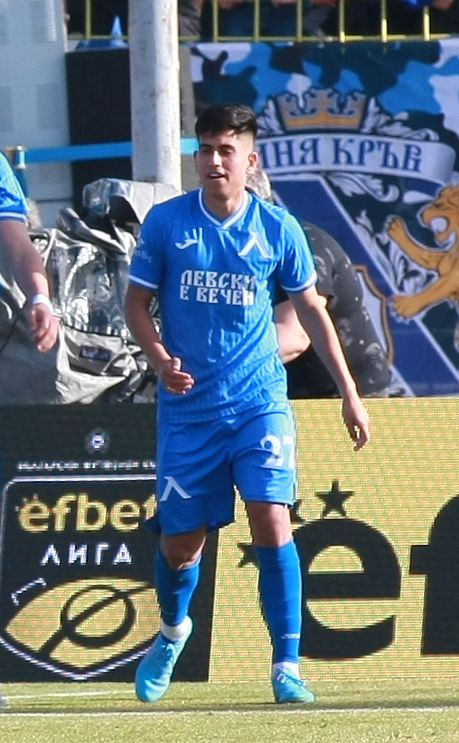
- Mitkov with Levski Sofia in 2022

Personal information
- Full name: Asen Ivanov Mitkov
- Date of birth: 17 February 2005 (age 21)
- Place of birth: Saedinenie, Bulgaria
- Height: 1.78 m (5 ft 10 in)
- Position: Midfielder

Team information
- Current team: Levski Sofia
- Number: 10

Youth career
- 2011–2016: Gigant Saedinenie
- 2016–2019: Botev Plovdiv
- 2019–: Levski Sofia

Senior career*
Years	Team	Apps	(Gls)
2021–	Levski Sofia	99	(3)
2022–	Levski Sofia II	8	(1)

International career^{‡}
2021–2022	Bulgaria U17	11	(1)
2022–2023	Bulgaria U18	2	(0)
2022	Bulgaria U19	4	(0)
2023–	Bulgaria U21	8	(1)
- * Club domestic league appearances and goals as of 15:24, 22 November 2026 (UTC) ‡ National team caps and goals as of 08:21, 6 September 2025 (UTC)

Asen Ivanov Mitkov (Bulgarian: Асен Иванов Митков; born 17 February 2005) is a Bulgarian professional footballer who plays as a midfielder for First League club Levski Sofia.

== Career ==
Mitkov began playing football at the age of 6 with his hometown club Gigant Saedinenie. His talent was recognized and in 2016, he joined Botev Plovdiv's youth academy. He kept progressing and three years later, he moved to Levski Sofia. He signed his first professional contract with Levski on 25 February 2021. On 21 May 2021, Mitkov made his first team debut, starting in a 2–1 away win against Cherno More. On 14 September 2023, he scored his first league goal for the team in a 2–0 home win over Pirin Blagoevgrad.

== Career statistics ==
As of 26 May 2025

Appearances and goals by club, season and competition
Club	Season	League			Bulgarian Cup		Continental		Other		Total	
Club	Season	Division	Apps	Goals	Apps	Goals	Apps	Goals	Apps	Goals	Apps	Goals
Levski Sofia	2020–21	First League	1	0	0	0	0	0	0	0	1	0
Levski Sofia	2021–22	First League	7	0	2	0	0	0	0	0	9	0
Levski Sofia	2022–23	First League	15	0	1	0	2 (Note: Appearances in UEFA Europa Conference League)	0	1 (Note: Appearance in Bulgarian Supercup)	0	19	0
Levski Sofia	2023–24	First League	25	2	1	0	6	0	0	0	32	2
Levski Sofia	2024–25	First League	20	1	0	0	0	0	0	0	20	1
Career total			68	3	4	0	8	0	1	0	81	3

== Honours ==
Levski Sofia

- Bulgarian First League: 2025–26
- Bulgarian Cup: 2021–22
