= Fábio Lima (footballer, born 1996) =

Brazilian footballer

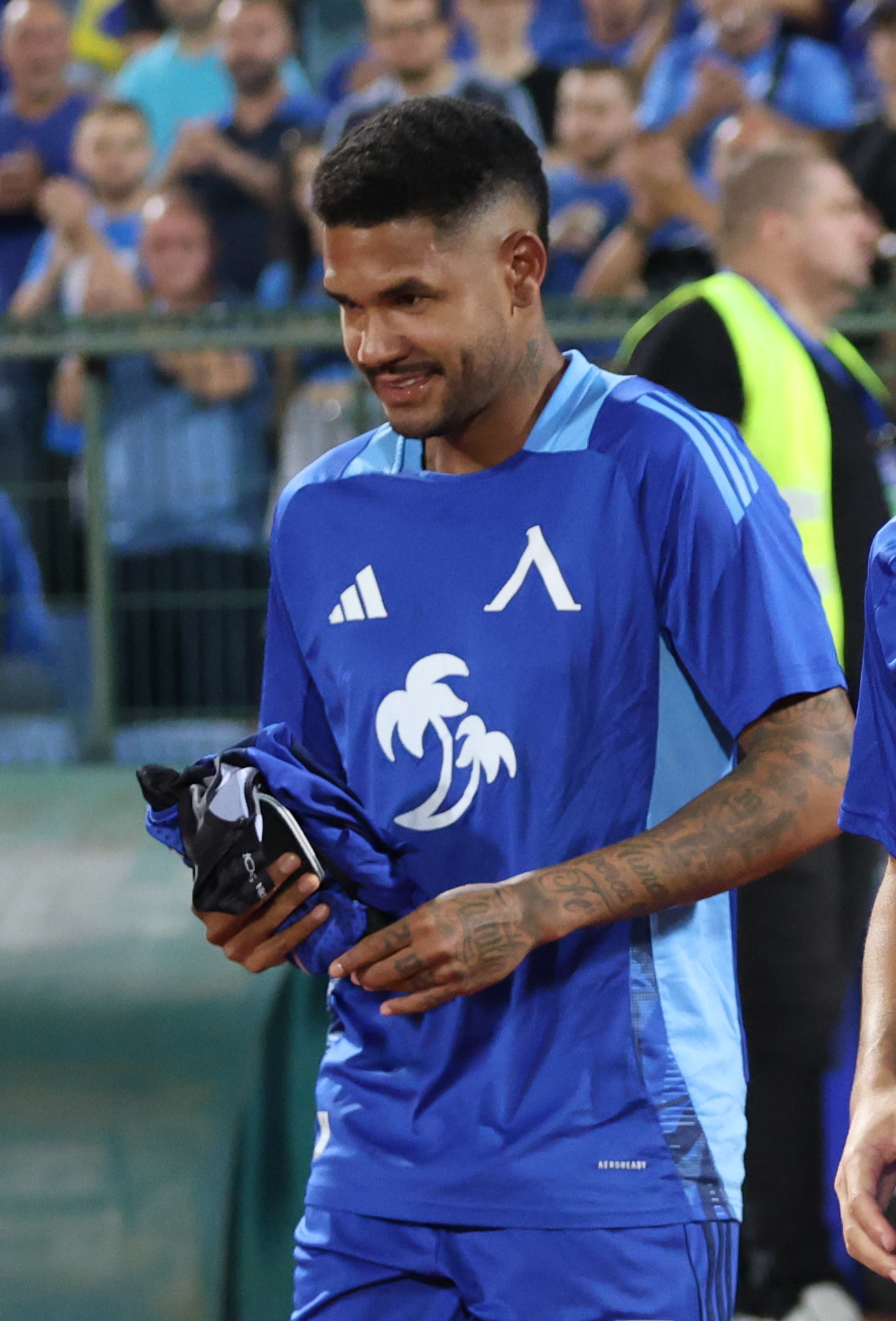
- Fábio Lima with Levski Sofia

Personal information
- Full name: Fábio de Lima Costa
- Date of birth: 22 December 1996 (age 29)
- Place of birth: Santa Rita, Brazil
- Height: 1.76 m (5 ft 9 in)
- Position: Winger

Team information
- Current team: Juventude
- Number: 11

Senior career*
Years	Team	Apps	(Gls)
2015	Auto Esporte	0	(0)
2016–2020	CSP	34	(2)
2016	→ Campinense (loan)	0	(0)
2016	→ Mirassol (loan)	10	(0)
2017	→ Desportiva Guarabira (loan)	8	(5)
2018	→ Sport Recife (loan)	0	(0)
2018	→ São Paulo Crystal (loan)	4	(0)
2019	→ Igrejinha (loan)	8	(0)
2019	→ Cianorte (loan)	0	(0)
2020–2021	Perilima	7	(4)
2021	→ Campinense (loan)	23	(6)
2022–2023	ABC	47	(5)
2024–2026	Levski Sofia	42	(4)
2026–	Juventude	33	(5)
- * Club domestic league appearances and goals as of 17 November 2026

Fábio de Lima Costa (born 22 December 1996), commonly known as Fábio Lima, is a Brazilian professional footballer who plays as a winger for Brazilian Série B team Juventude.
