= Kristian Dimitrov =

Bulgarian footballer (born 1997)

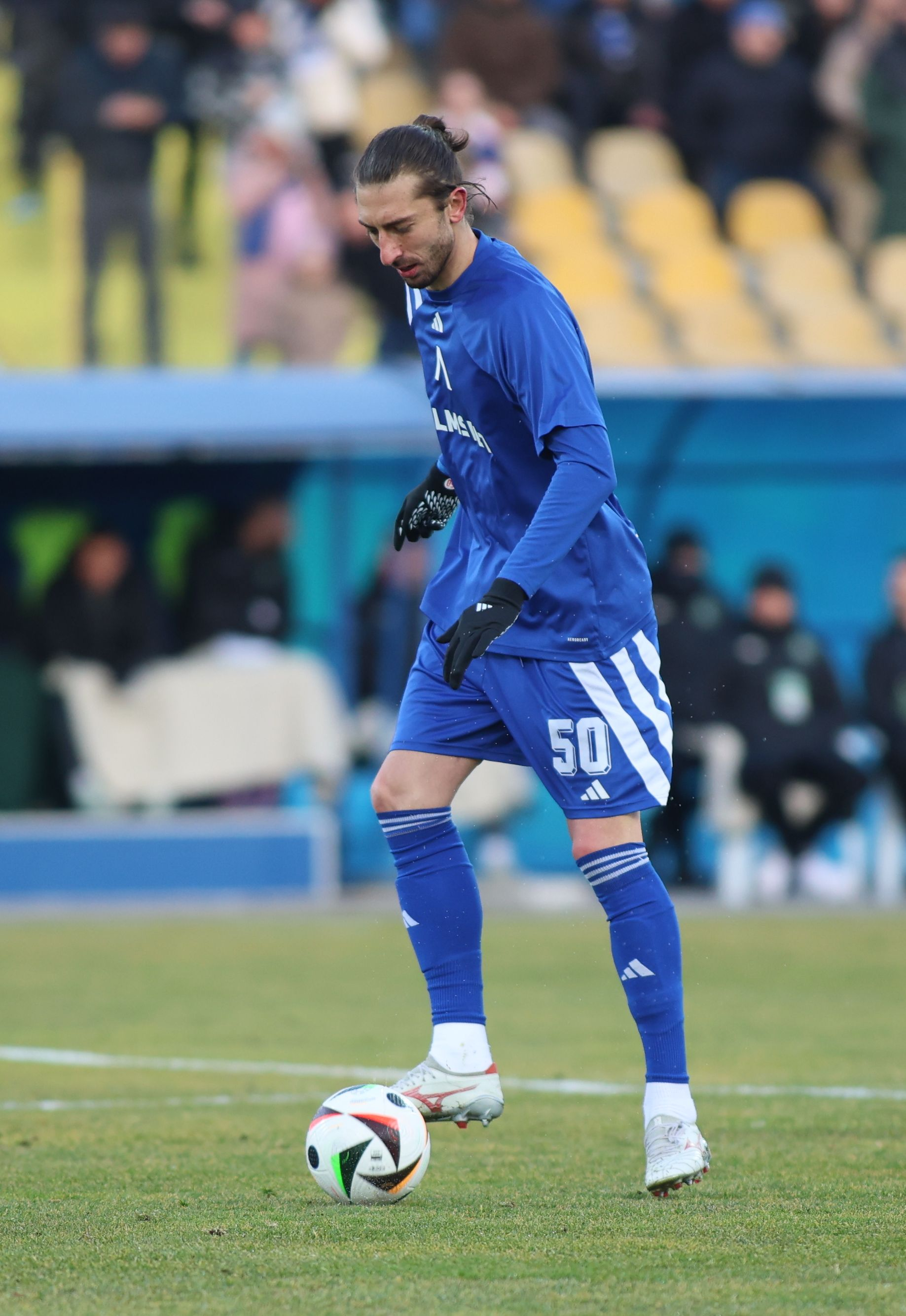

Personal information
- Full name: Kristian Traychev Dimitrov
- Date of birth: 27 February 1997 (age 29)
- Place of birth: Plovdiv, Bulgaria
- Height: 1.92 m (6 ft 4 in)
- Position: Centre-back

Team information
- Current team: Levski Sofia
- Number: 50

Youth career
- 2005–2013: Lokomotiv Plovdiv
- 2013–2016: Botev Plovdiv

Senior career*
Years	Team	Apps	(Gls)
2016–2020	Botev Plovdiv	64	(5)
2018	→ Montana (loan)	13	(1)
2020–2022	Hajduk Split	40	(3)
2022	→ CFR Cluj (loan)	1	(1)
2023–	Levski Sofia	100	(11)

International career^{‡}
2015–2016	Bulgaria U19	6	(0)
2019–	Bulgaria	28	(1)
- * Club domestic league appearances and goals as of 15:27, 22 November 2026 (UTC) ‡ National team caps and goals as of 6 October 2026

Kristian Traychev Dimitrov (Bulgarian: Кристиан Трайчев Димитров; born 27 February 1997) is a Bulgarian professional footballer who plays as a centre-back for First League club Levski Sofia and the Bulgarian national team.

== Club career ==
=== Botev Plovdiv ===
In the summer of 2013, Dimitrov joined Botev Plovdiv at under-17 level from Lokomotiv Plovdiv and progressed through the club's academy system.

Dimitrov made his first-team debut on 13 March 2016, when he came off the bench to replace Serkan Yusein in the 81st minute of a 3–1 league win over Cherno More Varna. His first senior goal came in the last round of the 2015–16 season; he scored the second goal in a 2–1 win over Ludogorets Razgrad on 27 May.

Dimitrov began to establish himself in the Botev first team from the 2016–17 season, making eight league starts. On 8 June 2017, he signed a new two-year contract with the club.

On 5 February 2018, Dimitrov joined Second League club Montana on loan for the remainder of the 2017–18 season. He made 13 appearances in total. His only goal came on 5 May 2018 when he opened the scoring in a 2–0 away win over Botev Galabovo.

In June 2018, Dimitrov returned to Botev and continued his progress during 2018–19, becoming a regular in the defence. On 24 April 2019, he scored a last-minute goal against CSKA Sofia, bringing the score to 3–3 and enabling his team (which had been reduced to nine men) to progress to the final of the Bulgarian Cup 6–5 on aggregate.

=== Hajduk Split and the loan to CFR Cluj ===
On 11 February 2020, it was announced that Dimitrov had signed a two-and-a-half-year contract with Hajduk Split.

Not finding much playing time in the 2021–22 season, he was loaned out to CFR Cluj in February 2022. He became a Liga I champion with the Romanian club, featuring in a single game, a 3–1 loss against FCSB, scoring in the 45th minute.

Returning to Hajduk, he spent the first part of the 2022–23 season largely on the bench, starting a single cup match, a 5–1 away win against Tehničar Cvetkovec, where he received a red card for a counter-attack stopping foul in the 33rd minute, and his contract was terminated by mutual consent on 17 December 2022. Dimitrov had scored three goals in 40 league matches at the Croatian club.

=== Levski Sofia ===
On 30 December 2022, Dimitrov returned to Bulgaria, signing a one-and-a-half-year deal with Levski Sofia.

== International career ==
In May 2019, following his good performances for Botev, Dimitrov was called up to the national team by new manager Krasimir Balakov. On 7 June 2019, he made his debut, playing the full 90 minutes in the 2–1 away loss against the Czech Republic in a Euro 2020 qualifier.

== Style of play ==
Krasimir Balakov compared Dimitrov with the legendary Bulgarian defender Trifon Ivanov, while being manager of Bulgaria.

== Career statistics ==
=== Club ===
As of 9 September 2026

Appearances and goals by club, season and competition
Club	Season	League			National cup (Note: Includes Bulgarian Cup, Croatian Cup)		Europe		Other		Total	
Club	Season	Division	Apps	Goals	Apps	Goals	Apps	Goals	Apps	Goals	Apps	Goals
Botev Plovdiv	2015–16	Bulgarian First League	3	1	0	0	0	0	—		3	1
Botev Plovdiv	2016–17	Bulgarian First League	12	0	1	0	—		—		13	0
Botev Plovdiv	2017–18	Bulgarian First League	0	0	2	0	0	0	0	0	2	0
Botev Plovdiv	2018–19	Bulgarian First League	31	4	5	1	—		—		36	5
Botev Plovdiv	2019–20	Bulgarian First League	18	0	0	0	—		—		18	0
Botev Plovdiv	Total		64	5	8	1	0	0	0	0	72	6
Montana (loan)	2017–18	Bulgarian Second League	13	1	0	0	—		—		13	1
Hajduk Split	2019–20	1. HNL	14	1	0	0	—		—		14	1
Hajduk Split	2020–21	1. HNL	20	2	1	0	0	0	—		21	2
Hajduk Split	2021–22	1. HNL	6	0	3	0	1 (Note: Appearance(s) in UEFA Europa Conference League)	0	—		10	0
Hajduk Split	2022–23	1. HNL	0	0	1	0	0	0	—		1	0
Hajduk Split	Total		40	3	5	0	1	0	0	0	46	3
CFR Cluj (loan)	2021–22	Liga I	1	1	—		—		—		1	1
Levski Sofia	2022–23	Bulgarian First League	9	0	—		—		—		9	0
Levski Sofia	2023–24	Bulgarian First League	25	2	1	0	4	0	—		30	2
Levski Sofia	2024–25	Bulgarian First League	27	5	2	0	0	0	—		29	5
Levski Sofia	2025–26	Bulgarian First League	30	3	1	0	8	0	—		39	3
Levski Sofia	2026–27	Bulgarian First League	4	1	0	0	8	1	1	0	13	2
Levski Sofia	Total		95	11	4	0	20	1	1	0	120	12
Career total			213	21	17	1	21	1	1	0	252	23

=== International ===
As of match played 6 October 2026

Appearances and goals by national team and year
National team	Year	Apps	Goals
Bulgaria	2019	6	1
Bulgaria	2020	6	0
Bulgaria	2021	2	0
Bulgaria	2023	3	0
Bulgaria	2025	6	0
Bulgaria	2026	5	0
Total		28	1

Scores and results list Bulgaria's goal tally first, score column indicates score after each Dimitrov goal.

List of international goals scored by Kristian Dimitrov
No.	Date	Venue	Cap	Opponent	Score	Result	Competition
1	10 June 2019	Vasil Levski National Stadium, Sofia, Bulgaria	6	Kosovo	2–1	2–3	UEFA Euro 2020 qualification

== Honours ==
Botev Plovdiv

- Bulgarian Cup: 2016–17
- Bulgarian Supercup: 2017

CFR Cluj

- Liga I: 2021–22

Hajduk Split

- Croatian Cup: 2021–22

Levski Sofia

- Bulgarian First League: 2025–26

Individual

- Bulgarian First League Best Defender: 2018–19
