= Martin Lukov =

Bulgarian footballer

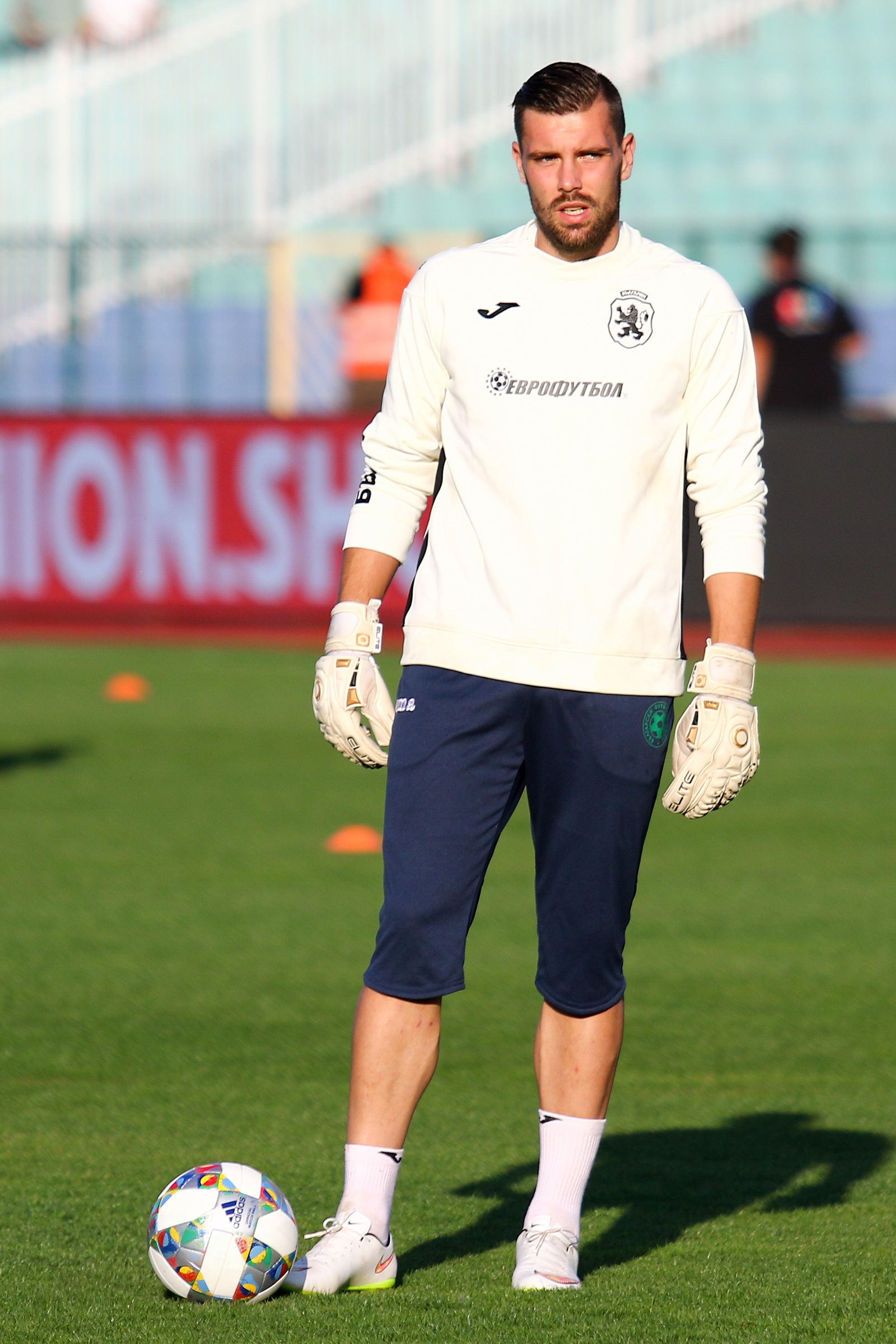

Personal information
- Full name: Martin Bozhidarov Lukov
- Date of birth: 5 July 1993 (age 33)
- Place of birth: Sofia, Bulgaria
- Height: 1.88 m (6 ft 2 in)
- Position: Goalkeeper

Team information
- Current team: Levski Sofia
- Number: 78

Youth career
- Slavia Sofia
- Levski Sofia

Senior career*
Years	Team	Apps	(Gls)
2012–2013	Slivnishki Geroy	4	(0)
2013–2014	Vitosha Bistritsa	7	(0)
2014	Pirin Razlog	14	(0)
2015	Oborishte	3	(0)
2015–2018	Dunav Ruse	58	(0)
2018–2021	Lokomotiv Plovdiv	73	(0)
2021–2022	Al-Tai	18	(0)
2022	Arda	10	(0)
2022–2023	Karmiotissa	0	(0)
2024	Lokomotiv Plovdiv	14	(0)
2025–	Levski Sofia	1	(0)

International career
2020–2021	Bulgaria	5	(0)
- * Club domestic league appearances and goals as of 13 May 2026

Martin Bozhidarov Lukov (Bulgarian: Мартин Луков; born 5 July 1993) is a Bulgarian professional footballer who plays as a goalkeeper for Bulgarian First League club Levski Sofia.

== Career ==
=== Dunav Ruse ===
Lukov joined Dunav Ruse in the summer of 2015, while the team was competing in the second division. He became a first choice goalkeeper immediately and played a crucial role during the season, as his team won the league and were promoted to the Bulgarian First League for the first time after a twenty-five year absence.

After the very first fixtures of the 2016–17 season, Lukov contributed heavily under the goalpost for Dunav's surprising five wins and two draws in the first seven rounds. In a match against Beroe Stara Zagora on 18 September 2016, he became Dunav's goalkeeper with the most minutes without conceding a goal, with 456 minutes, a record previously held by Ivan Ivanov during the club's tenure in the 1963–64 A Group season.

On 13 April 2017, it was confirmed that Lukov had sustained a serious injury and would be out of action for at least six months, thus missing the remainder of the 2016–17 season. On 13 October 2017, it was announced that Lukov will rejoin the team trainings, being completely ready to return to action. Lukov left the club in June 2018.

=== Lokomotiv Plovdiv ===
On 12 June 2018, Lukov signed with Lokomotiv Plovdiv for three years.

=== Levski Sofia ===
In July 2025, he joined Levski Sofia, signing a contract until the summer of 2027.

== International career ==
In 2013, Lukov played for the Bulgarian amateur national team, the South-East Bulgaria team, in the UEFA Regions' Cup.

In early 2017, he received a call up for Bulgaria, but didn't join the team due to injury. Lukov earned his first cap on 11 October 2020, in the 0–2 away loss against Finland in a UEFA Nations League match.

== Career statistics ==
=== Club ===
As of 26 February 2021

Appearances and goals by club, season and competition
Club	Season	League			Bulgarian Cup		Europe		Other		Total	
Club	Season	Division	Apps	Goals	Apps	Goals	Apps	Goals	Apps	Goals	Apps	Goals
Slivnishki Geroy	2012–13	V Group	4	0	?	?	—		—		4	0
Vitosha Bistritsa	2013–14	B Group	7	0	3	0	—		—		10	0
Pirin Razlog	2014–15	B Group	14	0	0	0	—		—		14	0
Oborishte	2014–15	V Group	3	0	0	0	—		—		3	0
Dunav Ruse	2015–16	B Group	28	0	0	0	—		—		28	0
Dunav Ruse	2016–17	First League	20	0	0	0	—		—		20	0
Dunav Ruse	2017–18	First League	10	0	0	0	0	0	4 (Note: Appearances in Bulgarian First League relegation play-offs)	0	14	0
Dunav Ruse	Total		58	0	0	0	0	0	4	0	62	0
Lokomotiv Plovdiv	2018–19	First League	28	0	5	0	—		—		33	0
Lokomotiv Plovdiv	2019–20	First League	23	0	2	0	4 (Note: Appearances in UEFA Europa League)	0	1 (Note: Appearance in Bulgarian Supercup)	0	30	0
Lokomotiv Plovdiv	2020–21	First League	19	0	0	0	2	0	1	0	22	0
Lokomotiv Plovdiv	Total		70	0	7	0	6	0	2	0	85	0
Career total			133	0	8	0	6	0	6	0	178	0

=== International ===
Appearances and goals by national team and year
National team	Year	Apps	Goals
Bulgaria
Bulgaria	2020	4	0
Bulgaria	2021	1	0
Total		5	0

== Honours ==
Lokomotiv Plovdiv

- Bulgarian Cup: 2018–19, 2019–20
- Bulgarian Supercup: 2020
