= Radoslav Kirilov =

Bulgarian footballer

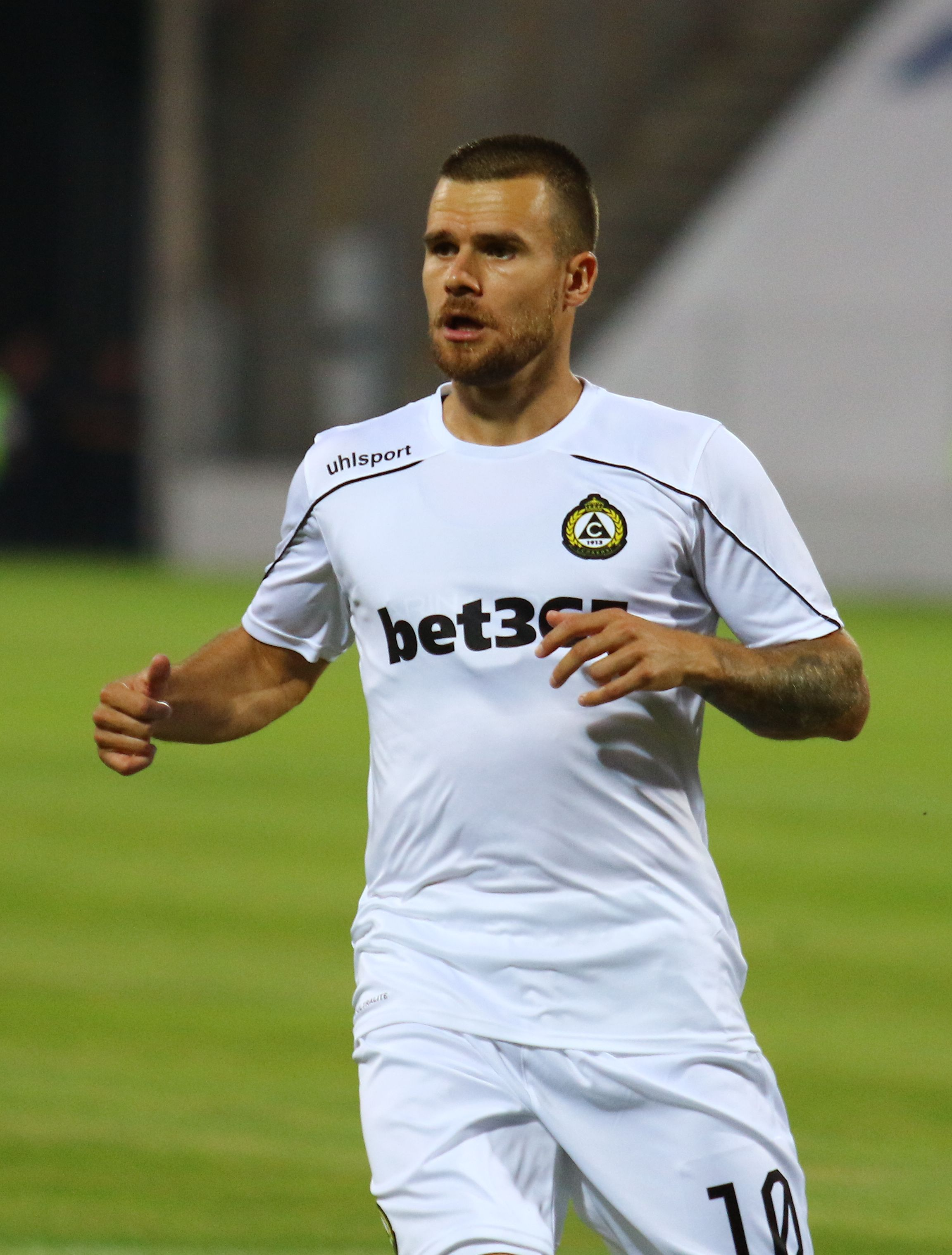
- Kirilov with Slavia Sofia in 2021

Personal information
- Full name: Radoslav Kirilov Kirilov
- Date of birth: 29 June 1992 (age 34)
- Place of birth: Simitli, Bulgaria
- Height: 1.72 m (5 ft 7 1/2 in)
- Position: Winger

Team information
- Current team: Levski Sofia
- Number: 99

Youth career
- –2003: Septemvri Simitli
- 2003–2008: Riccione
- 2008–2010: Rimini
- 2010–2012: Chievo

Senior career*
Years	Team	Apps	(Gls)
2009–2010	Rimini	7	(0)
2010–2018	Chievo	0	(0)
2012–2013	→ Lumezzane (loan)	27	(6)
2013–2014	→ Carpi (loan)	8	(0)
2014	→ Venezia (loan)	11	(2)
2014–2015	→ Cremonese (loan)	23	(4)
2015–2016	→ Südtirol (loan)	30	(2)
2016–2017	→ Beroe (loan)	17	(0)
2017–2018	→ Pirin (loan)	34	(3)
2018	Vis Pesaro	7	(1)
2019–2022	Slavia Sofia	100	(22)
2022–2025	CSKA 1948	84	(9)
2023	CSKA 1948 II	2	(1)
2025–	Levski Sofia	32	(2)

International career^{‡}
2009–2010	Bulgaria U19	2	(0)
2011–2013	Bulgaria U21	16	(4)
2016–	Bulgaria	25	(3)
- * Club domestic league appearances and goals as of 21:54, 25 May 2026 (UTC) ‡ National team caps and goals as of 14 October 2025

Radoslav Kirilov Kirilov (Bulgarian: Радослав Кирилов Кирилов; born 29 June 1992) is a Bulgarian professional footballer who plays as a winger for Bulgarian First League club Levski Sofia.

Kirilov was signed by Serie A club ChievoVerona from Rimini in 2010, but was unable to break into the first team and spent time on loan with Lumezzane, Carpi, Venezia, Cremonese, Südtirol, Beroe and Pirin Blagoevgrad, before joining Vis Pesaro permanently after his release by Chievo in June 2018. He then joined Slavia Sofia in January 2019. After that he joined CSKA 1948 in August 2022. He is now playing for Levski Sofia.

After representing Bulgaria at under-19 and under-21 levels, Kirilov made his senior international debut against Belarus in November 2016.

== Club career ==
=== Rimini ===
In 2009–10 season, Kirilov earned 7 appearances for Rimini Calcio in the Lega Pro Prima Divisione.

=== Chievo and loans ===
Kirilov signed for Chievo Verona in July 2010, on free transfer. In 2010–11 season, he scored eight goals in 25 appearances for the under-20s team in the Campionato Nazionale Primavera. Kirilov made his first team debut in a 2–0 2010–11 Coppa Italia win over Sassuolo Calcio on 28 October 2010, coming on as a substitute for Davide Moscardelli.

On 11 July 2012, Kirilov joined A.C. Lumezzane on a one-year loan deal.

On 10 July 2014, he was signed by U.S. Cremonese on loan for a season.

On 10 June 2016, Kirilov returned to Bulgaria, signing a year-long loan with Beroe Stara Zagora. On 21 July 2017, he was loaned for a further year to another Bulgarian club, Pirin Blagoevgrad.

=== Slavia Sofia ===
In January 2019, Kirilov joined Slavia Sofia.

=== CSKA 1948 ===
On 26 August 2022, Kirilov signed for CSKA 1948.

== International career ==
Kirilov made his first UEFA European Under-19 Championship qualifying round appearance for the Bulgaria under-19 side on 7 October 2009 in a 1–1 draw against Northern Ireland. He earned his first cap for the senior national team on 13 November 2016, coming on as a second-half substitute in the 1–0 win over Belarus in a 2018 World Cup qualifier.

== Career statistics ==
As of 17 August 2025

Appearances and goals by club, season and competition
Club		Season	League		National cup (Note: Includes Coppa Italia, Coppa Italia Lega Pro, Bulgarian Cup)		Continental		Other		Total	
Division	Season	Season	Apps	Goals	Apps	Goals	Apps	Goals	Apps	Goals	Apps	Goals
Rimini Calcio	2009–10	Serie D	8	0	0	0	—		—		8	0
Chievo Verona	2010–11	Serie A	0	0	2	0	—		—		2	0
Chievo Verona	2011–12	Serie A	0	0	2	0	—		—		2	0
Lumezzane (loan)	2012–13	Lega Pro	27	6	2	1	—		—		29	7
Carpi (loan)	2013–14	Serie B	8	0	0	0	—		—		8	0
Venezia (loan)	2013–14	Lega Pro	11	2	0	0	—		—		11	2
Cremonese (loan)	2014–15	Lega Pro	23	4	3	3	—		—		26	7
Südtirol (loan)	2015–16	Lega Pro	30	2	2	1	—		—		32	3
Beroe (loan)	2016–17	First League	17	0	1	0	2 (Note: Appearances in UEFA Europa League)	0	—		20	0
Pirin (loan)	2017–18	First League	34	3	1	0	—		—		35	3
Vis Pesaro	2018–19	Serie C	7	1	0	0	—		—		7	1
Slavia Sofia	2018–19	First League	14	5	0	0	—		—		14	5
Slavia Sofia	2019–20	First League	23	4	1	0	—		—		24	4
Slavia Sofia	2020–21	First League	29	6	5	1	0	0	—		34	7
Slavia Sofia	2021–22	First League	29	6	5	1	—		—		34	7
Slavia Sofia	2022–23	First League	5	1	0	0	—		—		5	1
Slavia Sofia	Total		100	22	11	2	—		—		111	24
CSKA 1948	2022–23	First League	25	2	5	1	—		—		30	3
CSKA 1948	2023–24	First League	30	3	2	0	2 (Note: Appearances in UEFA Conference League)	0	1 (Note: Appearance in Bulgarian Super Cup)	0	35	3
CSKA 1948	2024–25	First League	29	4	2	3	4	0	—		35	7
CSKA 1948	Total		84	9	9	4	6	0	1	0	100	13
CSKA 1948 II	2023–24	Second League	2	1	—		—		—		2	1
Levski Sofia	2025–26	First League	5	2	0	0	6 (Note: Four appearances in UEFA Europa League, two appearances and one goal in UEFA Conference League)	1	0	0	11	3
Career total			356	52	33	11	14	1	1	0	404	64

=== International ===
As of match played 14 October 2025

Appearances and goals by national team and year
National team	Year	Apps	Goals
Bulgaria
Bulgaria	2016	1	0
Bulgaria	2018	1	0
Bulgaria	2021	4	1
Bulgaria	2022	4	1
Bulgaria	2023	2	0
Bulgaria	2024	8	0
Bulgaria	2025	5	1
Total		25	3

Scores and results list Bulgaria's goal tally first, score column indicates score after each Kirilov goal.

List of international goals scored by Radoslav Kirilov
No.	Date	Venue	Opponent	Score	Result	Competition
1	11 November 2021	Chornomorets Stadium, Odesa, Ukraine	Ukraine	1–0	1–1	Friendly
2	23 September 2022	Huvepharma Arena, Razgrad, Bulgaria	Gibraltar	3–1	5–1	2022–23 UEFA Nations League C
3	11 October 2025	Vasil Levski National Stadium, Sofia, Bulgaria	Turkey	1–1	1–6	2026 FIFA World Cup qualification

== Honours ==
Levski Sofia

- Bulgarian First League: 2025–26

Individual

- Bulgarian First League Goal of the Week: 2021–22 (Week 21)
