= Tijan Sonha =

Gambian footballer

Personal information
- Full name: Tijan Sonha Drammeh
- Date of birth: 31 July 2001 (age 25)
- Place of birth: Sant Iscle de Vallalta, Spain
- Height: 1.80 m (5 ft 11 in)
- Position: Left back

Team information
- Current team: Radnik Surdulica
- Number: 2

Youth career
- 2018–2020: Damm

Senior career*
Years	Team	Apps	(Gls)
2020–2021	Castellón B	7	(0)
2021–2022	Lloret B	25	(11)
2022	Llotet	1	(0)
2022–2023	As Pontes	38	(8)
2023–2024	Sarriana	19	(3)
2024–2025	Bergantiños	34	(0)
2025–2026	Beroe	35	(1)
2026–	Radnik Surdulica	10	(0)

International career^{‡}
2026–	The Gambia	1	(0)
- * Club domestic league appearances and goals as of 01:19, 21 October 2026 (UTC) ‡ National team caps and goals as of 18:58, 1 June 2026 (UTC)

Tijan Sonha Drammeh (born 31 July 2001) is a professional footballer who plays as a left back for Radnik Surdulica in the Serbian SuperLiga. Born in Spain, he plays for The Gambia national team.

== Club career ==
Sonha was born in Catalonia and developed through the lower tiers of Spanish regional football. He lived in various towns across Catalonia and Galicia as his career progressed, including Lloret de Mar, As Pontes, Sarria and Carballo. In the summer of 2022, Sonha joined CD As Pontes of the Preferente de Galicia, where he played all 38 available matches and scored eight goals, impressing enough to earn a move to a higher level.

Sonha subsequently joined Sarriana of the Tercera Federación, making 19 appearances and scoring three goals during the 2023–24 season. In 2024, Sonha joined Bergantiños of the Segunda Federación, also featuring in the Copa del Rey during his time at the club.

In July 2025, despite attracting interest from several Primera Federación clubs, Sonha chose to join Beroe of the Bulgarian First League, marking his first move into professional football outside Spain. He made 27 appearances for Beroe in his debut season, scoring once.

== International career ==
Born in Spain, Sonha is of Gambian descent and holds dual citizenship. He was called up to The Gambia for a set of friendlies in May 2026.
