= Maicon (footballer, born 2000) =

Brazilian footballer

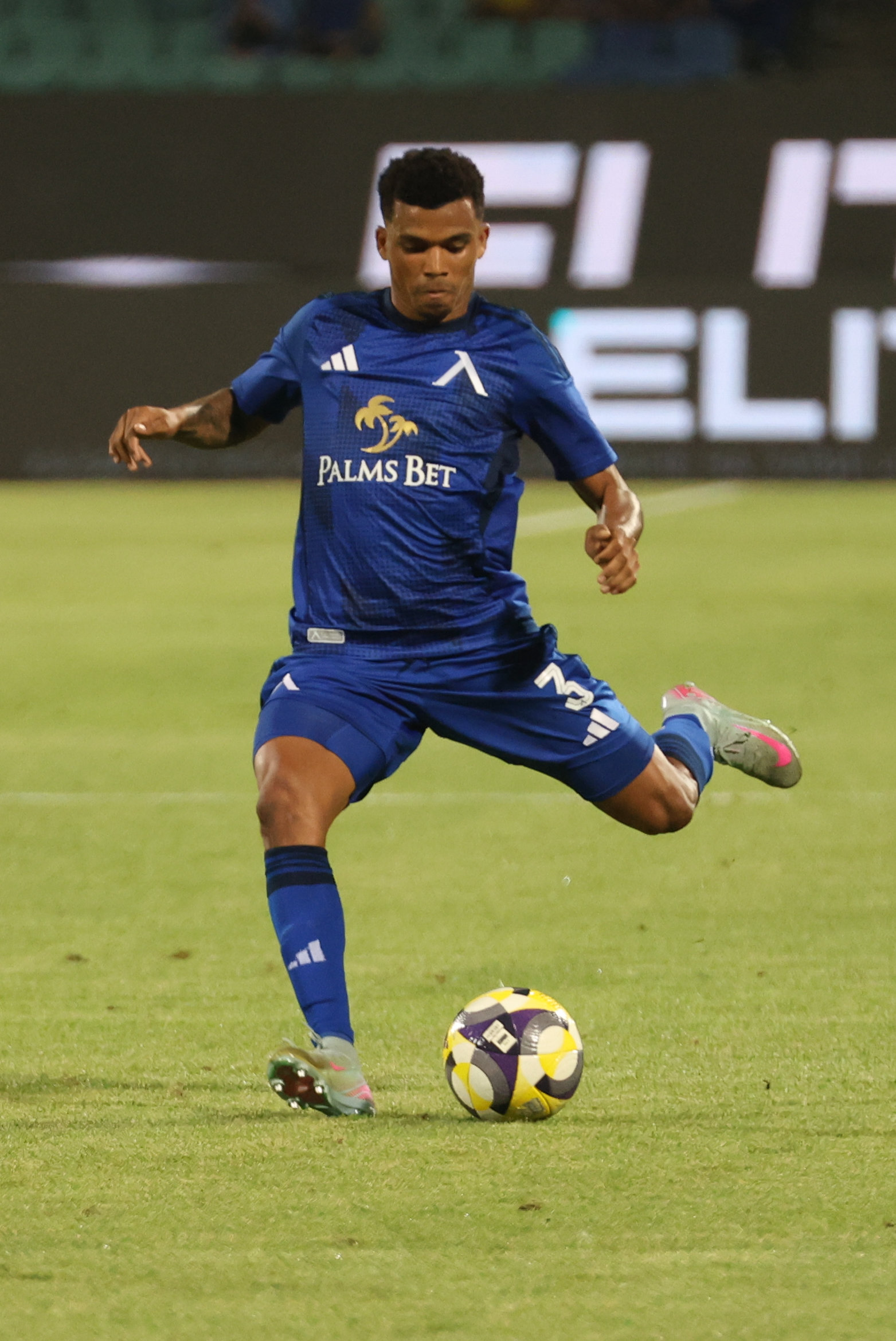
- Maicon with Levski Sofia in 2025

Personal information
- Full name: Maicon Araújo dos Santos
- Date of birth: 26 April 2000 (age 26)
- Place of birth: Itabuna, Brazil
- Height: 1.70 m (5 ft 7 in)
- Position: Left-back

Team information
- Current team: Levski Sofia
- Number: 3

Youth career
- Serra

Senior career*
Years	Team	Apps	(Gls)
2019–2022	Serra	34	(3)
2022–2023	Nova Venécia	28	(1)
2023	Vitória-ES	13	(1)
2024	Nova Iguaçu	13	(1)
2024–	Levski Sofia	74	(6)
- * Club domestic league appearances and goals as of 15:22, 22 November 2026 (UTC)

Maicon Araújo dos Santos (born 26 April 2000), known as Maicon Esquerdinha or just Maicon, is a Brazilian professional footballer who plays as a left-back for Bulgarian First League club Levski Sofia.

== Career ==
Born in Itabuna, Maicon grew up in Sequeiro Grande, a neighborhood of Itajuípe, also in the state of Bahia, before moving to Cariacica, Espírito Santo at the age of eight. He began his career with Serra in the 2019 Copa Espírito Santo, and subsequently established as a regular starter for the club, being named the best left-back of the 2022 Campeonato Capixaba.

On 6 May 2022, Maicon signed for Nova Venécia for the 2022 Série D. On 11 May 2023, he joined Vitória-ES also for the fourth tier.

On 24 November 2023, Maicon agreed to a contract with Nova Iguaçu for the 2024 season. Initially a backup to Italo Silva, he became a starter as Italo left the club, and helped the Carrossel da Baixada to reach the 2024 Campeonato Carioca finals for the first time ever.

In May 2024, Maicon joined Bulgarian club Levski Sofia, signing a three-year contract with the team.

== Career statistics ==
As of 31 August 2025

Appearances and goals by club, season and competition
Club	Season	League			State league		National cup (Note: Includes Copa do Brasil, Bulgarian Cup)		Continental		Other		Total	
Club	Season	Division	Apps	Goals	Apps	Goals	Apps	Goals	Apps	Goals	Apps	Goals	Apps	Goals
Serra	2019	Série D	0	0	0	0	0	0	—		8 (Note: Appearance(s) in Copa Espírito Santo)	0	8	0
Serra	2020	Capixaba	—		11	0	—		—		—		11	0
Serra	2021	Capixaba	—		11	1	—		—		9	0	20	1
Serra	2022	Capixaba	—		12	2	—		—		—		12	2
Serra	Total		0	0	34	3	0	0	0	0	17	0	51	3
Nova Venécia	2022	Série D	14	0	—		—		—		7	0	21	0
Nova Venécia	2023	Capixaba	—		14	1	—		—		—		14	1
Nova Venécia	Total		14	0	14	1	0	0	0	0	7	0	35	1
Vitória-ES	2023	Série D	13	1	—		—		—		—		13	1
Nova Iguaçu	2024	Série D	0	0	13 (Note: Appearances in Campeonato Carioca)	1	2	0	—		—		15	1
Levski Sofia	2024–25	First League	30	0	—		2	0	—		—		32	0
Levski Sofia	2025–26	First League	6	1	—		0	0	7 (Note: Three appearances in UEFA Europa League, four appearances in UEFA Conference League)	0	—		13	1
Levski Sofia	Total		36	1	0	0	2	0	7	0	0	0	45	1
Career total			63	1	61	5	4	0	7	0	24	0	159	7

== Honours ==
Levski Sofia

- Bulgarian First League: 2025–26
