= 2026–27 PFC Levski Sofia season =

Levski Sofia
2026–27 season
- President: Nasko Sirakov
- Manager: Julio Velázquez
- Stadium: Stadion Georgi Asparuhov
- First League: 2nd
- Bulgarian Cup: Round of 16
- Bulgarian Supercup: Runners-up
- Bulgarian Elite Cup: Quarter-finals
- UEFA Champions League: Play-off round
- UEFA Europa League: League phase
- Top goalscorer: League: three players (4); All: Reinaldo (9)
- Highest home attendance: 38,976 v. AEK Athens (18 August 2026)
- Lowest home attendance: 6,000 v. Septemvri Sofia (1 August 2026)
- Average home league attendance: 10,500
- Biggest win: 6–0 v. Spartak Varna (H)
- Biggest defeat: 0–4 v. AEK Athens (A)
Home colours	Away colours	Third colours
- All statistics correct as of 22 November 2026.

The 2026–27 season is Levski Sofia's 106th season in the First League. This article shows player statistics and all matches (official and friendly) that the club will play during the season.

== Transfers ==
=== In ===
No.	Pos.	Nat.	Name	Age	EU	Moving from	Type	Transfer window	Ends	Transfer fee	Source
2	DF	(Brazil)	Hevertton	25	EU	(England) Queens Park Rangers	Transfer	Summer	2028	Free	
7	FW	(Brazil)	Reinaldo	24	Non-EU	(Portugal) Santa Clara	Transfer	Summer	2029	1 500 000 €	
8	MF	(Serbia)	Marko Grujić	30	Non-EU	(Greece) AEK Athens	Transfer	Summer	2028 (Note: Including a non-fixed 1-year option.)	Free	
19	MF	(Morocco)	El Mehdi El Moubarik	25	Non-EU	(United Arab Emirates) Al Ain	Transfer	Summer	2029	Undisclosed	
20	DF	(Spain)	Álex Centelles	26	EU	(Spain) Almería	Transfer	Summer	2029	Free	
27	FW	(Angola)	David Kusso	22	Non-EU	(Portugal) Chaves	Transfer	Summer	2029	Undisclosed	
28	FW	(Bulgaria)	Stivan Stoyanchov	18	EU	B team	Promotion	Summer			
35	MF	(Portugal)	Serginho	26	EU	(Portugal) Santa Clara	Transfer	Summer	2029	1 100 000 €	
55	DF	(Bulgaria)	Petko Hristov	27	EU	(Italy) Spezia	Loan	Summer	2027 (Note: Including a non-fixed half-year option.)	Undisclosed	
77	FW	(Bulgaria)	Adrian Raychev	20	EU	(Italy) Pisa	Loan	Summer	2027	Undisclosed	
	FW	(Bulgaria)	Preslav Bachev	20	EU	(Bulgaria) Dunav Ruse	Loan return	Summer			

=== Out ===
No.	Pos.	Nat.	Name	Age	EU	Moving to	Type	Transfer window	Transfer fee	Source
8	MF	(Ghana)	Carlos Ohene	32	Non-EU		End of contract	Summer	Free	
37	MF	(Brazil)	Rildo	26	Non-EU	(Portugal) Santa Clara	Loan return	Summer		
45	FW	(Croatia)	Marko Dugandžić	32	EU	(Indonesia) Bali United	End of contract	Summer	Free	
70	MF	(Bulgaria)	Georgi Kostadinov	35	EU		Retired	Summer		
71	DF	(Cameroon)	Oliver Kamdem	24	EU		Released	N/A (Note: Outside of transfer window)	Free	
95	FW	(Martinique)	Karl Fabien	25	EU	(Serbia) IMT	Released	Summer	Free	
	FW	(Bulgaria)	Preslav Bachev	20	EU	(Bulgaria) Arda	Transfer	Summer	Undisclosed	

=== Loans out ===
No.	Pos.	Nat.	Name	Age	EU	Moving to	Type	Transfer window	Transfer fee	Source
	DF	(Croatia)	Stipe Vulikić	25	EU	(Bulgaria) Septemvri Sofia		Summer	Undisclosed	

=== Contract renewals ===
No.	Pos.	Nat.	Name	Date	Contract length	Contract ends	Source
4	DF	(Venezuela)	Christian Makoun	4 September 2026	1 year	2028	
18	MF	(Slovenia)	Gašper Trdin	4 July 2026	1 year	2028	
21	DF	(Portugal)	Aldair Neves	19 August 2026	1 year	2028	
28	FW	(Bulgaria)	Stivan Stoyanchov	18 September 2026	1 year	2029	
50	DF	(Bulgaria)	Kristian Dimitrov	3 July 2026	1 year	2029	
92	GK	(Bulgaria)	Svetoslav Vutsov	10 July 2026	1 year	2028	

== Squad ==
Updated on 21 November 2026.

No.	Name	Nationality	Position(s)	Age	EU	Ends	Signed from	Transfer fee	Notes
Goalkeepers
1	Ognyan Vladimirov	Bulgaria	GK	18	EU	2029	Youth system	W/S	
78	Martin Lukov	Bulgaria	GK	33	EU	2027	(Bulgaria) Lokomotiv Plovdiv	Free	Originally from Youth system
92	Svetoslav Vutsov	Bulgaria	GK	24	EU	2028	(Bulgaria) Slavia Sofia	Undisclosed	Originally from Youth system
Defenders
2	Hevertton	Brazil	RB	25	EU	2028	(England) Queens Park Rangers	Free	Second nationality: Portugal
3	Maicon	Brazil	LB	26	Non-EU	2027	(Brazil) Nova Iguaçu	€250 000	
4	Christian Makoun	Venezuela	CB/LB/DM	26	EU	2028	(Cyprus) Anorthosis Famagusta	Free	Second nationality: Belgium
20	Álex Centelles	Spain	LB	27	EU	2029	(Spain) Almería	Free	
21	Aldair Neves	Portugal	RB	27	EU	2028	(Spain) Ponferradina	Undisclosed	
31	Nikola Serafimov	North Macedonia	CB	27	Non-EU	2028	(Hungary) Fehérvár	Free	
50	Kristian Dimitrov	Bulgaria	CB	29	EU	2029	(Croatia) Hajduk Split	Free	
55	Petko Hristov	Bulgaria	CB	27	EU	2027 (Note: Including a non-fixed half-year option.)	(Italy) Spezia	Loan	Originally from Youth system
Midfielders
8	Marko Grujić	Serbia	DM/CM	30	Non-EU	2028 (Note: Including a non-fixed 1-year option.)	(Greece) AEK Athens	Free	
10	Asen Mitkov	Bulgaria	AM/CM	21	EU	2027	Youth system	W/S	
18	Gašper Trdin	Slovenia	DM/CB	28	EU	2028	(Slovenia) Bravo	Undisclosed	
19	El Mehdi El Moubarik	Morocco	DM/CM	25	Non-EU	2029	(United Arab Emirates) Al Ain	Undisclosed	
22	Mazire Soula	France	AM/CM/LW	28	EU	2028	(Bulgaria) Cherno More	Free	Second nationality: Algeria
35	Serginho	Portugal	CM	26	EU	2029	(Portugal) Santa Clara	€1 100 000	
47	Akram Bouras	Algeria	CM	24	Non-EU	2028	(Algeria) MC Alger	€350 000	
Forwards
7	Reinaldo	Brazil	LW/RW	25	Non-EU	2029	(Portugal) Santa Clara	€1 500 000	
9	Juan Perea	Colombia	CF	27	Non-EU	2028	(Bulgaria) Lokomotiv Plovdiv	Undisclosed	
11	Armstrong Oko-Flex	Ireland	LW/RW/CF	24	EU	2028	(Bulgaria) Botev Plovdiv	€300 000	Second nationality: England
12	Mustapha Sangaré	Mali	CF	27	EU	2027	(Portugal) Varzim	€150 000	Second nationality: France
17	Everton Bala	Brazil	RW/LW/AM	27	Non-EU	2027	(Brazil) Mirassol	Undisclosed	
27	David Kusso	Angola	RW/LB	22	Non-EU	2029	(Portugal) Chaves	Undisclosed	
28	Stivan Stoyanchov	Bulgaria	CF	19	EU	2029	Youth system	W/S	
77	Adrian Raychev	Bulgaria	RW	20	EU	2027	(Italy) Pisa	Loan	Originally from Youth system
99	Radoslav Kirilov	Bulgaria	LW/RW	34	EU	2027	(Bulgaria) CSKA 1948	Free	

== Performance overview ==
Competition	First match	Last match	Starting round	Final position	Record							
Competition	First match	Last match	Starting round	Final position	Pld	W	D	L	GF	GA	GD	Win %
First League	17 July 2026		Matchday 1		14	11	2	1	29	9	+20	78.57
Bulgarian Cup	18 October 2026		Round of 32		1	1	0	0	2	0	+2	100.00
Bulgarian Supercup	9 September 2026		Final	Runners-up	1	0	0	1	2	4	−2	0.00
Bulgarian Elite Cup	6 February 2027		Quarter-finals		0	0	0	0	0	0	+0	—
UEFA Champions League	7 July 2026	26 August 2026	First qualifying round	Play-off round	8	4	3	1	10	7	+3	50.00
UEFA Europa League	17 September 2026		League phase		4	2	1	1	4	3	+1	50.00
Total					28	18	6	4	47	23	+24	64.29

Last updated: 22 November 2026
Source: Fixtures

== Fixtures ==
Win Draw Loss Upcoming fixture

=== Friendlies ===
==== Summer ====
19 June 2026	Levski Sofia	4–0	Akademik Svishtov	Pravets
18:00 UTC+3	Oko-Flex 2'; Kusso 3'; Bouras 38'; Perea 69'	Report		Stadium: Gradski; Referee: Petar Dimitrov (Sofia)

23 June 2026	Levski Sofia	6–0	Etar	Pravets
18:30 UTC+3	Kusso 13'; Kamdem 20'; Soula 32'; Reinaldo 33', 45'; Raychev 89'	Report		Stadium: Gradski; Referee: Hristiyana Guteva (Sofia)

27 June 2026	Levski Sofia	1–1	Botev Vratsa	Pravets
18:30 UTC+3	Everton 90+3'	Report	Petkov 54'	Stadium: Gradski; Referee: Martin Markov (Sofia)

30 June 2026	Levski Sofia (Bulgaria)	5–0	(Serbia) Radnik Surdulica	Sofia
19:30 UTC+3	Reinaldo 13'; Maicon 45+2'; Everton 56'; Serginho 72'; Oko-Flex 76'	Report		Stadium: Georgi Asparuhov; Referee: Ivaylo Nenkov (Sofia)

=== First League ===
==== Regular season ====
===== League table =====
Pos	Team	Pld	W	D	L	GF	GA	GD	Pts	Qualification
1	CSKA Sofia	15	10	5	0	35	12	+23	35	Qualification for the Championship group
2	Levski Sofia	14	11	2	1	29	9	+20	35	Qualification for the Championship group
3	CSKA 1948	15	9	3	3	34	17	+17	30	Qualification for the Championship group
4	Ludogorets	13	9	3	1	26	11	+15	30	Qualification for the Championship group
5	Botev Plovdiv	15	7	3	5	26	24	+2	24	Qualification for the Conference League group

Updated to match(es) played on 22 November 2026. Source: Bulgarian Football
Rules for classification: 1) Points; 2) Head-to-head points; 3) Head-to-head goal difference; 4) Head-to-head goals scored; 5) Head-to-head away goals scored (only if two teams); 6) Goal difference; 7) Goals scored; 8) Fairplay ranking; 9) Draw

===== Results summary =====
Overall								Home						Away					
Pld	W	D	L	GF	GA	GD	Pts	W	D	L	GF	GA	GD	W	D	L	GF	GA	GD
14	11	2	1	29	9	+20	35	6	0	1	18	5	+13	5	2	0	11	4	+7

Last updated: 22 November 2026.
Source: bulgarian-football.com

===== Results by round =====
Round	1	2	3	4	5	6	7	8	9	10	11	12	13	14	15	16	17	18	19	20	21	22	23	24	25	26
Ground	H	A	H	H	A	H	A	H	A	H	A	A	H	A	H	A	A	H	A	H	A	H	A	H	H	A
Result	W	W	W	W	W	W	W	W	D		W	D	L	W	W											
Position	1	2	1	1	4	1	1	1	1	1	1	2	1	2	2											

Updated to match(es) played on 22 November 2026. Source: See Results
A = Away; H = Home; W = Win; D = Draw; L = Loss

===== Matches =====
The league fixtures were announced on 6 June 2026.

17 July 2026 1	Levski Sofia	2–1	Dunav Ruse	Sofia
21:15 UTC+3	Dimitrov 22'; Reinaldo (yellow card) 64'; Bouras 70'	Report	Minchev 84'	Stadium: Georgi Asparuhov; Attendance: 8,000; Referee: Kristiyan Kolev (Plovdiv); Man of the Match: Kristian Dimitrov

25 July 2026 2	Lokomotiv Sofia	1–2	Levski Sofia	Sofia
21:15 UTC+3	Delev 63'; Minchev (yellow card) 69'; Kostadinov (yellow card) 69'	Report	Reinaldo 77'; Serginho 82'; Oko-Flex (yellow card) 90+6'	Stadium: Lokomotiv; Attendance: 2,600; Referee: Nikola Popov (Sofia); Man of the Match: Reinaldo

1 August 2026 3	Levski Sofia	3–0	Septemvri Sofia	Sofia
19:00 UTC+3	Bouras 34'; Oko-Flex (yellow card) 70', (goal) 76'; Serginho 79'	Report	Baurenski (yellow card) 37'; Hristov (yellow card) 65'; Atanasov (yellow card) 90+3'	Stadium: Georgi Asparuhov; Attendance: 6,000; Referee: Mariyan Grebencharski (Samokov); Man of the Match: Álex Centelles

7 August 2026 4	Levski Sofia	2–0	Lokomotiv Plovdiv	Sofia
21:15 UTC+3	Kusso 5'; El Moubarik (yellow card) 53'; Reinaldo 90+3'	Report	Ali (yellow card) 42'; Longville (yellow card) 66'; Pavlov (yellow card) 69'; Ivanov (yellow card) 73'	Stadium: Georgi Asparuhov; Attendance: 8,000; Referee: Gero Piskov (Sofia); Man of the Match: David Kusso

22 August 2026 6	Levski Sofia	6–0	Spartak Varna	Sofia
21:15 UTC+3	Oko-Flex 8', 64'; Perea 15'; Kusso 60'; Stoyanchov 87'; Raychev 90'	Report	Sousa (yellow card) 49'; Oliveira (red card) 79'	Stadium: Georgi Asparuhov; Attendance: 7,000; Referee: Georgi Davidov (Veliko Tarnovo); Man of the Match: Armstrong Oko-Flex

30 August 2026 7	Botev Plovdiv	1–3	Levski Sofia	Plovdiv
19:00 UTC+3	Hein (yellow card) 5'; Naumov (yellow card) 54'; Chandarov 64', (penalty missed) 84'; Lucas Araújo (yellow card) 86'	Report	Grujić 51'; Aldair 59'; El Moubarik (yellow card) 69'; Oko-Flex (yellow card) 86'; Reinaldo 90+3'; Vutsov (yellow card) 90+6'	Stadium: Hristo Botev; Attendance: 8,000; Referee: Todor Kirov (Varna); Man of the Match: Marko Grujić

2 September 2026 5	Slavia Sofia	1–2	Levski Sofia	Sofia
20:00 UTC+3	V. Miletić (yellow card) 45+5'; Stoev 57'; Kazaldzhiev (yellow card) 82'; Marin (yellow card) 90'	Report	Oko-Flex 70'; Perea 75'	Stadium: Aleksandar Shalamanov; Attendance: 3,500; Referee: Lyuboslav Lyubomirov (Pernik); Man of the Match: Armstrong Oko-Flex
Note: Originally scheduled for 15 August 2026, the match was postponed by the BFU due to Levski's participation in the UCL.

5 September 2026 8	Levski Sofia	1–0	CSKA 1948	Sofia
21:15 UTC+3	Perea (yellow card) 28', (goal) 58'; Oko-Flex (yellow card) 82'; Velázquez (yellow card) 83'	Report	Cuéllar (yellow card) 17'; Medina (yellow card) 86'; S. Aleksandrov (yellow card) 90+2', (red card) 90+2'	Stadium: Georgi Asparuhov; Attendance: 9,500; Referee: Mariyan Grebencharski (Samokov); Man of the Match: Juan Perea

13 September 2026 9	Botev Vratsa	0–0	Levski Sofia	Vratsa
17:45 UTC+3	Achkov (yellow card) 77'	Report		Stadium: Hristo Botev; Attendance: 4,800; Referee: Volen Chinkov (Sofia); Man of the Match: Ivan Goranov

11 October 2026 11	Cherno More	0–2	Levski Sofia	Varna
17:30 UTC+3	Squadrone (yellow card) 60'; Padilla (yellow card) 80'; Tombak (yellow card) 84'	Report	Trdin (yellow card) 24'; El Moubarik 26'; Reinaldo 62'	Stadium: Ticha; Attendance: 7,215; Referee: Radoslav Gidzhenov (Plovdiv); Man of the Match: El Mehdi El Moubarik

27 October 2026 12	Arda	1–1	Levski Sofia	Kardzhali
19:30 UTC+2	Bachev 23'; Velkovski (yellow card) 59'; Kovachev (yellow card) 90'; Kotev (yellow card) 90+1'	Report	Centelles 62'; Serafimov (yellow card) 71'	Stadium: Arena Arda; Attendance: 2,300; Referee: Gero Piskov (Sofia); Man of the Match: Dimitar Velkovski

31 October 2026 14	Dunav Ruse	0–1	Levski Sofia	Ruse
17:30 UTC+2	Chorbadzhiyski (yellow card) 23'; Apostolov (yellow card) 77'	Report	Dimitrov (yellow card) 82'; Sangaré 90+3'; Serginho (yellow card) 90+4'	Stadium: Gradski; Attendance: 4,200; Referee: Mariyan Grebencharski (Samokov); Man of the Match: Mustapha Sangaré
Note: Originally scheduled for the beginning of November 2026, the match was moved forward a week earlier, as the BFU swapped matchdays 13 and 14 on request from the Sofia Directorate of Internal Affairs, citing security reasons concerning the Eternal derby of Bulgarian football and the 2026 Bulgarian presidential election potentially being held at the same time.

8 November 2026 13	Levski Sofia	0–3	CSKA Sofia	Sofia
17:00 UTC+2	Aldair (yellow card) 28'; Centelles (yellow card) 31'; Sangaré (yellow card) 71'	Report	Rodríguez (yellow card) 5'; Ebong 9', (yellow card) 28'; Pittas 15'; Sensi (yellow card) 29'; Gbamin 57', (yellow card) 60'	Stadium: Vasil Levski National Stadium; Attendance: 28,000; Referee: Nikola Popov (Sofia); Man of the Match: Teodor Ivanov
Note: Originally scheduled for the end of October 2026, the match was pushed back a week later, as the BFU swapped matchdays 13 and 14 on request from the Sofia Directorate of Internal Affairs, citing security reasons concerning this match and the 2026 Bulgarian presidential election potentially being held at the same time.

22 November 2026 15	Levski Sofia	4–1	Lokomotiv Sofia	Sofia
15:30 UTC+2	Bidounga 8' (o.g.); Everton 34'; Aldair (yellow card) 40'; Perea 56'; Maicon 83'	Report	Neychev (yellow card) 23'; Bidounga (yellow card) 70'; Ogaga (yellow card) 71'; Medfai (yellow card) 76'; Kostov 86'	Stadium: Georgi Asparuhov; Attendance: 7,000; Referee: Georgi Davidov (Veliko Tarnovo); Man of the Match: Everton Bala

29 November 2026 16	Septemvri Sofia	v	Levski Sofia	Sofia
15:00 UTC+2				Stadium: Vasil Levski National Stadium (Note: Septemvri host their matches at the Vasil Levski National Stadium, Sofia, as their own venue, Stadion Dragalevtsi, Sofia, does not meet BFU requirements.)

3 December 2026 10	Levski Sofia	v	Ludogorets Razgrad	Sofia
18:30 UTC+2				Stadium: Georgi Asparuhov
Note: Originally scheduled for 20 September 2026, the match was postponed by the BFU due to Levski's participation in the UEL.

6 December 2026 17	Lokomotiv Plovdiv	v	Levski Sofia	Plovdiv
15:15 UTC+2				Stadium: Stadion Hristo Bonev

February 2027 18	Levski Sofia	v	Slavia Sofia	Sofia
--:-- UTC+2				Stadium: Georgi Asparuhov

February 2027 19	Spartak Varna	v	Levski Sofia	Varna
--:-- UTC+2				Stadium: Spartak

February–March 2027 20	Levski Sofia	v	Botev Plovdiv	Sofia
--:-- UTC+3				Stadium: Georgi Asparuhov

March 2027 21	CSKA 1948	v	Levski Sofia	Bistritsa
--:-- UTC+3				Stadium: Bistritsa

March 2027 22	Levski Sofia	v	Botev Vratsa	Sofia
--:-- UTC+3				Stadium: Georgi Asparuhov

March 2027 23	Ludogorets Razgrad	v	Levski Sofia	Razgrad
--:-- UTC+3				Stadium: Huvepharma Arena

April 2027 24	Levski Sofia	v	Cherno More	Sofia
--:-- UTC+3				Stadium: Georgi Asparuhov

April 2027 25	Levski Sofia	v	Arda	Sofia
--:-- UTC+3				Stadium: Georgi Asparuhov

April 2027 26	CSKA Sofia	v	Levski Sofia	Sofia
--:-- UTC+3				Stadium: Vasil Levski National Stadium

=== Bulgarian Cup ===
18 October 2026 Round of 32	Spartak Pleven	0–2	Levski Sofia	Lovech (Note: Spartak Pleven hosted their Round of 32 match at the Gradski stadion, Lovech, as their own venue, Stadion Pleven, Pleven, is undergoing renovation works.)
18:00 UTC+3	Trifonov (yellow card) 90+1'; Shopov (yellow card) 90+3'	Report	Everton 57' (pen.); Centelles (yellow card) 59'; Soula 80'	Stadium: Gradski; Attendance: 6,000; Referee: Stanimir Trenchev (Sofia)

15 December 2026 Round of 16	Levski Sofia	v	Ludogorets Razgrad	Sofia
18:00 UTC+2				Stadium: Georgi Asparuhov

=== Bulgarian Supercup ===
9 September 2026	Levski Sofia	2–4	CSKA Sofia	Sofia
18:30 UTC+3	Grujić (yellow card) 19'; Serginho 40'; Dimitrov (red card) 81'; Perea (yellow card) 81'; Everton 90+4' (pen.)	Report	Almeida (yellow card) 45+1'; Zwarts 49', 70'; Sensi 65' (pen.); Ebong (red card) 81'; Pastor (yellow card) 81'; Martino (yellow card) 82'; Gbamin (yellow card) 84'; Aldair 89' (o.g.); Yanev (red card) 90'; Lapoukhov (yellow card) 90+7'	Stadium: Vasil Levski National Stadium; Attendance: 27,345; Referee: Gero Piskov (Sofia)

=== Bulgarian Elite Cup ===
6 February 2027 Quarter-final	Levski Sofia	v	Arda	Sofia
--:-- UTC+2				Stadium: Georgi Asparuhov

=== UEFA Champions League ===
==== First qualifying round ====
7 July 2026 1st leg	Borac Banja Luka (Bosnia and Herzegovina)	1–1	(Bulgaria) Levski Sofia	Banja Luka, Bosnia and Herzegovina
20:30 UTC+2	Juričić 9' (pen.), (yellow card) 43'; Ogrinec (yellow card) 60'	Report	Serafimov (yellow card) 7'; Oko-Flex 55'	Stadium: Banja Luka City Stadium; Attendance: 10,102; Referee: Mehmet Türkmen (Turkey)

14 July 2026 2nd leg	Levski Sofia (Bulgaria)	4–0 (5–1 agg.)	(Bosnia and Herzegovina) Borac Banja Luka	Sofia, Bulgaria
20:30 UTC+3	Oko-Flex 48'; Reinaldo 59', 65'; Perea 85'	Report	Saničanin (yellow card) 17'; Herrera (yellow card) 44'; Vuković (yellow card) 68'	Stadium: Georgi Asparuhov; Attendance: 17,325; Referee: Andrew Madley (England)

==== Second qualifying round ====
22 July 2026 1st leg	Levski Sofia (Bulgaria)	1–0	(Romania) Universitatea Craiova	Sofia, Bulgaria
20:30 UTC+3	Dimitrov 8'; Aldair (yellow card) 42'; Everton (yellow card) 50'; Maicon (yellow card) 90+1'	Report	Romanchuk (yellow card) 34'; Baiaram (yellow card) 42'	Stadium: Georgi Asparuhov; Attendance: 16,118; Referee: Adam Ladebäck (Sweden)

29 July 2026 2nd leg	Universitatea Craiova (Romania)	2–2 (2–3 agg.)	(Bulgaria) Levski Sofia	Craiova, Romania
20:30 UTC+3	Baiaram (yellow card) 34'; Bancu 45+2'; Rus 48', (yellow card) 88'	Report	Serafimov (yellow card) 9'; Everton 13'; Aldair 16', (yellow card) 26'; Maicon (yellow card) 45+3'; Bouras (yellow card) 55'	Stadium: Ion Oblemenco; Attendance: 27,037; Referee: Matteo Marcenaro (Italy)

==== Third qualifying round ====
4 August 2026 1st leg	Levski Sofia (Bulgaria)	1–0	(Kazakhstan) Kairat	Sofia, Bulgaria
20:30 UTC+3	Serginho 90+2', (yellow card) 90+3'	Report		Stadium: Georgi Asparuhov; Attendance: 16,916; Referee: Donatas Rumšas (Lithuania)

11 August 2026 2nd leg	Kairat (Kazakhstan)	0–1 (0–2 agg.)	(Bulgaria) Levski Sofia	Turkistan, Kazakhstan (Note: Kairat played their home leg at the Turkistan Arena in Turkistan, instead of their regular home ground, Almaty Central Stadium in Almaty.)
20:00 UTC+5	Baybek (yellow card) 45+6'; Kasabulat (yellow card) 60'; Mendonça (yellow card) 90+4'	Report	Everton (yellow card) 7'; Reinaldo 13'; Aldair (yellow card) 73'; Serafimov (yellow card) 88'; Perea (yellow card) 89'	Stadium: Turkistan Arena; Attendance: 7,000; Referee: Daniel Siebert (Germany)

==== Play-off round ====
18 August 2026 1st leg	Levski Sofia (Bulgaria)	0–0	(Greece) AEK Athens	Sofia, Bulgaria
22:00 UTC+3		Report		Stadium: Vasil Levski National Stadium (Note: Levski played their Champions League play-off round home leg at the Vasil Levski National Stadium in Sofia, instead of their regular stadium, Stadion Georgi Asparuhov in Sofia, which does not meet UEFA requirements for this stage.); Attendance: 38,976; Referee: Glenn Nyberg (Sweden)

26 August 2026 2nd leg	AEK Athens (Greece)	4–0 (4–0 agg.)	(Bulgaria) Levski Sofia	Athens, Greece
22:00 UTC+3	Jović 7'; Varga 12', 29'; Marin (yellow card) 51', (goal) 55' (pen.); Pilios (yellow card) 74'; Zini (yellow card) 89'	Report		Stadium: Allwyn Arena; Attendance: 30,500; Referee: Clément Turpin (France)

=== UEFA Europa League ===
==== League phase ====
The league phase draw was held on 28 August 2026.

Pos	Team	Pld	W	D	L	GF	GA	GD	Pts	Qualification
8	(Turkey) Beşiktaş	4	2	1	1	11	8	+3	7	Advance to round of 16 (seeded)
9	(Croatia) Dinamo Zagreb	4	2	1	1	5	4	+1	7	Advance to knockout phase play-offs (seeded)
10	(Bulgaria) Levski Sofia	4	2	1	1	4	3	+1	7	Advance to knockout phase play-offs (seeded)
11	(England) Sunderland	4	2	1	1	4	4	0	7	Advance to knockout phase play-offs (seeded)
12	(Netherlands) NEC	4	2	1	1	8	9	−1	7	Advance to knockout phase play-offs (seeded)

Updated to match(es) played on 5 November 2026. Source: UEFA
Rules for classification: League phase tiebreakers

Overall								Home						Away					
Pld	W	D	L	GF	GA	GD	Pts	W	D	L	GF	GA	GD	W	D	L	GF	GA	GD
4	2	1	1	4	3	+1	7	1	0	1	1	1	0	1	1	0	3	2	+1

Last updated: 5 November 2026.
Source: UEFA

Round	1	2	3	4	5	6	7	8
Ground	H	A	A	H	A	H	H	A
Result	L	D	W	W				
Position	25	24	17	10				

Updated to match(es) played on 5 November 2026. Source: UEFA
A = Away; H = Home; W = Win; D = Draw; L = Loss

17 September 2026 1	Levski Sofia (Bulgaria)	0–1	(Austria) Red Bull Salzburg	Sofia, Bulgaria
19:45 UTC+3	Centelles (yellow card) 55'	Report	Tabaković 39', (yellow card) 56'; Kitano (yellow card) 41'; Mazurek (yellow card) 60'; Vertessen (yellow card) 65'; Barry (yellow card) 90+3'	Stadium: Vasil Levski National Stadium (Note: Levski play their Europa League league phase home matches at the Vasil Levski National Stadium in Sofia, instead of their regular stadium, Stadion Georgi Asparuhov in Sofia, which does not meet UEFA requirements.); Attendance: 22,378; Referee: Mohammad Al-Emara (Finland)

15 October 2026 2	NEC (Netherlands)	1–1	(Bulgaria) Levski Sofia	Nijmegen, Netherlands
21:00 UTC+2	Lebreton (yellow card) 24'; Chery 64'	Report	Reinaldo 35'	Stadium: Goffertstadion; Attendance: 11,700; Referee: Aliyar Aghayev (Azerbaijan)

22 October 2026 3	Viktoria Plzeň (Czech Republic)	1–2	(Bulgaria) Levski Sofia	Plzeň, Czech Republic
21:00 UTC+2	Kabongo 62'; Pirgić (yellow card) 87'	Report	Soula (yellow card) 20'; Everton 44'; Reinaldo 65'	Stadium: Doosan Arena; Attendance: 10,143; Referee: Alejandro Hernández Hernández (Spain)

5 November 2026 4	Levski Sofia (Bulgaria)	1–0	(Poland) Jagiellonia Białystok	Sofia, Bulgaria
19:45 UTC+2	Everton (yellow card) 71'; Stoyanchov 83', (yellow card) 84'; Kusso (yellow card) 90+3'	Report	Montóia (yellow card) 55'; Romanczuk (yellow card) 78'; Jesús Imaz (yellow card) 86'	Stadium: Vasil Levski National Stadium; Attendance: 23,301; Referee: Enea Jorgji (Albania)

26 November 2026 5	Marseille (France)	v	(Bulgaria) Levski Sofia	Marseille, France
18:45 UTC+1		Report		Stadium: CEPAC Vélodrome

10 December 2026 6	Levski Sofia (Bulgaria)	v	(Norway) Lillestrøm	Sofia, Bulgaria
22:00 UTC+2		Report		Stadium: Vasil Levski National Stadium

21 January 2027 7	Levski Sofia (Bulgaria)	v	(Italy) Milan	Sofia, Bulgaria
22:00 UTC+2		Report		Stadium: Vasil Levski National Stadium

28 January 2027 8	Sunderland (England)	v	(Bulgaria) Levski Sofia	Sunderland, England
20:00 UTC+0		Report		Stadium: Stadium of Light

== Squad statistics ==
As of 22 November 2026

=== Appearances and goals ===
No.	Pos	Nat	Player	Total		First League		Bulgarian Cup		Bulgarian Supercup		Bulgarian Elite Cup		Champions League		Europa League	
No.	Pos	Nat	Player	Apps	Goals	Apps	Goals	Apps	Goals	Apps	Goals	Apps	Goals	Apps	Goals	Apps	Goals
1	GK	(Bulgaria) BUL	Ognyan Vladimirov	6	0	5	0	1	0	0	0	0	0	0	0	0	0
2	DF	(Brazil) BRA	Hevertton	10	0	5+2	0	1	0	0	0	0	0	0+2	0	0	0
3	DF	(Brazil) BRA	Maicon	24	1	7+4	1	0+1	0	1	0	0	0	6+1	0	4	0
4	DF	(Venezuela) VEN	Christian Makoun	20	0	11+1	0	0+1	0	1	0	0	0	0+2	0	4	0
7	FW	(Brazil) BRA	Reinaldo	27	9	7+6	4	0+1	0	1	0	0	0	8	3	4	2
8	MF	(Serbia) SRB	Marko Grujić	15	1	5+5	1	0+1	0	1	0	0	0	0	0	3	0
9	FW	(Colombia) COL	Juan Perea	23	5	7+4	4	1	0	0+1	0	0	0	0+7	1	0+3	0
10	MF	(Bulgaria) BUL	Asen Mitkov	14	0	6+2	0	0	0	0+1	0	0	0	0+4	0	0+1	0
11	FW	(Republic of Ireland) IRL	Armstrong Oko-Flex	27	6	8+5	4	1	0	1	0	0	0	7+1	2	1+3	0
12	FW	(Mali) MLI	Mustapha Sangaré	6	1	1+5	1	0	0	0	0	0	0	0	0	0	0
17	FW	(Brazil) BRA	Everton Bala	27	5	6+7	1	0+1	1	1	1	0	0	8	1	4	1
18	MF	(Slovenia) SLO	Gašper Trdin	23	0	9+2	0	1	0	1	0	0	0	4+3	0	1+2	0
19	MF	(Morocco) MAR	El Mehdi El Moubarik	24	1	9+3	1	0	0	0+1	0	0	0	6+2	0	3	0
20	DF	(Spain) ESP	Álex Centelles	24	1	8+3	1	1	0	0+1	0	0	0	5+3	0	1+2	0
21	DF	(Portugal) POR	Aldair Neves	25	2	6+7	1	0	0	1	0	0	0	6+1	1	4	0
22	MF	(France) FRA	Mazire Soula	24	1	9+3	0	1	1	0+1	0	0	0	0+6	0	2+2	0
27	FW	(Angola) ANG	David Kusso	13	2	6	2	0	0	0	0	0	0	1+3	0	1+2	0
28	FW	(Bulgaria) BUL	Stivan Stoyanchov	13	2	3+4	1	0	0	0	0	0	0	0+4	0	0+2	1
31	DF	(North Macedonia) MKD	Nikola Serafimov	13	0	4	0	1	0	0	0	0	0	8	0	0	0
35	MF	(Portugal) POR	Serginho	26	4	8+4	2	1	0	1	1	0	0	8	1	4	0
47	MF	(Algeria) ALG	Akram Bouras	9	2	5	2	0	0	0	0	0	0	3	0	0+1	0
50	DF	(Bulgaria) BUL	Kristian Dimitrov	22	2	8+1	1	0	0	1	0	0	0	8	1	4	0
55	DF	(Bulgaria) BUL	Petko Hristov	1	0	0	0	1	0	0	0	0	0	0	0	0	0
77	FW	(Bulgaria) BUL	Adrian Raychev	2	1	0+2	1	0	0	0	0	0	0	0	0	0	0
78	GK	(Bulgaria) BUL	Martin Lukov	0	0	0	0	0	0	0	0	0	0	0	0	0	0
92	GK	(Bulgaria) BUL	Svetoslav Vutsov	22	0	9	0	0	0	1	0	0	0	8	0	4	0
99	FW	(Bulgaria) BUL	Radoslav Kirilov	0	0	0	0	0	0	0	0	0	0	0	0	0	0
Players from the reserve team:
32	FW	(Bulgaria) BUL	Ivo Motev	0	0	0	0	0	0	0	0	0	0	0	0	0	0
33	MF	(Bulgaria) BUL	Sasho Grancharov	0	0	0	0	0	0	0	0	0	0	0	0	0	0
34	DF	(Bulgaria) BUL	Aleksandar Krastev	0	0	0	0	0	0	0	0	0	0	0	0	0	0
Players away on loan:
	DF	(Croatia) CRO	Stipe Vulikić	0	0	0	0	0	0	0	0	0	0	0	0	0	0
Players who left during the season:
	DF	(Cameroon) CMR	Oliver Kamdem	5	0	2	0	1	0	0	0	0	0	2	0	0	0
	FW	(Martinique) MTQ	Karl Fabien	0	0	0	0	0	0	0	0	0	0	0	0	0	0

=== Goalscorers ===
Rank	Player	FPL	BC	BSC	BEC	UCL	UEL	Total
1	(Brazil) Reinaldo	4	0	0	0	3	2	9
2	(Republic of Ireland) Armstrong Oko-Flex	4	0	0	0	2	0	6
3	(Colombia) Juan Perea	4	0	0	0	1	0	5
3	(Brazil) Everton Bala	1	1	1	0	1	1	5
5	(Portugal) Serginho	2	0	1	0	1	0	4
6	(Algeria) Akram Bouras	2	0	0	0	0	0	2
6	(Angola) David Kusso	2	0	0	0	0	0	2
6	(Bulgaria) Kristian Dimitrov	1	0	0	0	1	0	2
6	(Portugal) Aldair Neves	1	0	0	0	1	0	2
6	(Bulgaria) Stivan Stoyanchov	1	0	0	0	0	1	2
11	(Spain) Álex Centelles	1	0	0	0	0	0	1
11	(Serbia) Marko Grujić	1	0	0	0	0	0	1
11	(Brazil) Maicon	1	0	0	0	0	0	1
11	(Morocco) El Mehdi El Moubarik	1	0	0	0	0	0	1
11	(Bulgaria) Adrian Raychev	1	0	0	0	0	0	1
11	(Mali) Mustapha Sangaré	1	0	0	0	0	0	1
11	(France) Mazire Soula	0	1	0	0	0	0	1
Own goal		1	0	0	0	0	0	1
Total		29	2	2	0	10	4	47

=== Clean sheets ===
Rank	Goalkeeper	FPL	BC	BSC	BEC	UCL	UEL	Total
1	(Bulgaria) Svetoslav Vutsov	5	0	0	0	5	1	11
2	(Bulgaria) Ognyan Vladimirov	2	1	0	0	0	0	3
Total		7	1	0	0	5	1	14

=== Disciplinary record ===
Includes all competitive matches.

N	P	Nat.	Name	First League			Bulgarian Cup			Bulgarian Supercup			Bulgarian Elite Cup			Champions League			Europa League			Total			Notes
N	P	Nat.	Name	Yellow card	Second yellow card	Red card	Yellow card	Second yellow card	Red card	Yellow card	Second yellow card	Red card	Yellow card	Second yellow card	Red card	Yellow card	Second yellow card	Red card	Yellow card	Second yellow card	Red card	Yellow card	Second yellow card	Red card	Notes
3	DF	(Brazil)	Maicon													2						2			
7	FW	(Brazil)	Reinaldo	1																		1			
8	MF	(Serbia)	Marko Grujić							1												1			
9	FW	(Colombia)	Juan Perea	1						1						1						3			
11	FW	(Republic of Ireland)	Armstrong Oko-Flex	4																		4			
12	FW	(Mali)	Mustapha Sangaré	1																		1			
17	FW	(Brazil)	Everton Bala													2			1			3			
18	MF	(Slovenia)	Gašper Trdin	1																		1			
19	MF	(Morocco)	El Mehdi El Moubarik	2																		2			
20	DF	(Spain)	Álex Centelles	1			1												1			3			
21	DF	(Portugal)	Aldair Neves	2												3						5			
22	MF	(France)	Mazire Soula																1			1			
27	FW	(Angola)	David Kusso																1			1			
28	FW	(Bulgaria)	Stivan Stoyanchov																1			1			
31	DF	(North Macedonia)	Nikola Serafimov	1												3						4			
35	MF	(Portugal)	Serginho	1												1						2			
47	MF	(Algeria)	Akram Bouras													1						1			
50	DF	(Bulgaria)	Kristian Dimitrov	1								1										1		1	
92	GK	(Bulgaria)	Svetoslav Vutsov	1																		1			
		(Spain)	Julio Velázquez	1																		1			

Last updated: 22 November 2026
Source: soccerway
Only competitive matches
(yellow card) = Number of bookings; (second yellow card) = Number of sending offs after a second yellow card; (red card) = Number of sending offs by a direct red card.
