= 2026 Bulgarian Supercup =

BET.bg Суперкупа на България
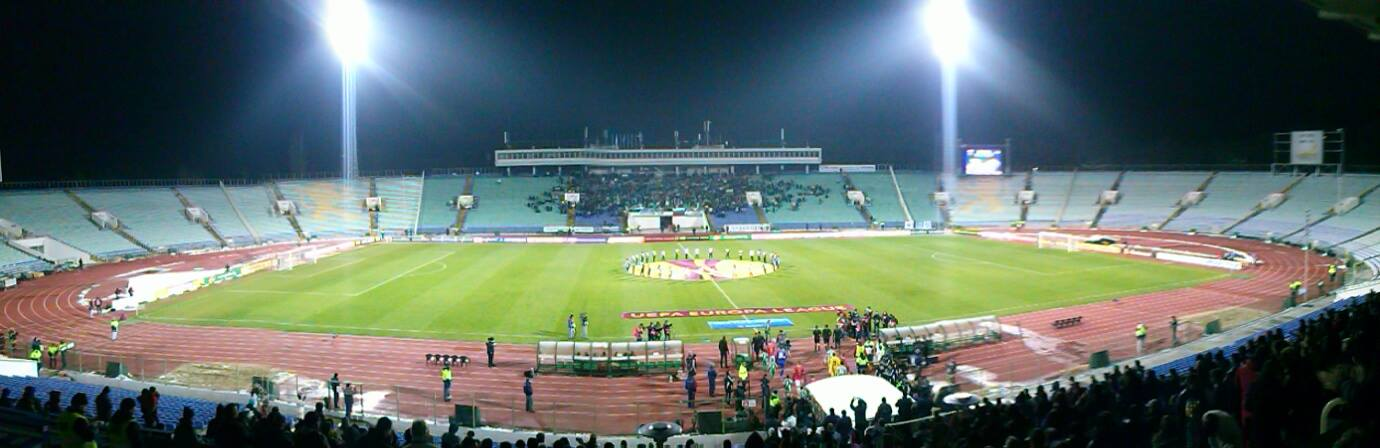
Levski Sofia	CSKA Sofia
First League	Bulgarian Cup
2	4
- Date: 9 September 2026
- Venue: Vasil Levski, Sofia
- Referee: Gero Piskov (Sofia)
- Attendance: 27,345
- Weather: Fair; 30 °C (86 °F)

The 2026 Bulgarian Supercup was the 23rd edition of the Bulgarian Supercup, an annual football match played between the winners of the previous season's First League and the Bulgarian Cup. The match was played between the champions of the 2025–26 First League, Levski Sofia, and the 2025–26 Bulgarian Cup winners, CSKA Sofia. The match was sponsored by BET.bg, hence being branded as BET.bg Bulgarian Supercup.

This was the second consecutive Supercup appearance for Levski, the first one since 2021 for CSKA, and the 7th appearance in total for both teams. It was also the first Eternal derby in a Supercup final since 2006.

On 10 June 2026, the BFU had announced that the match had been scheduled for 9–16 September 2026. On 15 August 2026, due to both teams' participation in the play-off rounds of UEFA competitions, the BPFL announced three potential dates for the match to be played, depending on the outcomes of the play-off rounds. As Levski confirmed their place in the Europa League league phase, the match was set to be played on 9 September 2026.

CSKA won the match 4–2 for their 5th Supercup title.

== Match details ==
9 September 2026
18:30 UTC+3

Levski Sofia	2–4	CSKA Sofia
Serginho 40'; Everton 90+4' (pen.)	Report	Zwarts 49', 70'; Sensi 65' (pen.); Aldair 89' (o.g.)

Vasil Levski National Stadium, Sofia
Attendance: 27,345
Referee: Gero Piskov (Sofia)

Levski	CSKA

GK	92	(Bulgaria) Svetoslav Vutsov
RB	21	(Portugal) Aldair Neves
CB	50	(Bulgaria) Kristian Dimitrov (c)	(red card) 81'
CB	4	(Venezuela) Christian Makoun		(substituted off) 68'
LB	3	(Brazil) Maicon		(substituted off) 57'
CM	18	(Slovenia) Gašper Trdin
CM	8	(Serbia) Marko Grujić	(yellow card) 19'	(substituted off) 57'
RW	11	(Republic of Ireland) Armstrong Oko-Flex		(substituted off) 84'
AM	35	(Portugal) Serginho
LW	17	(Brazil) Everton Bala
CF	7	(Brazil) Reinaldo		(substituted off) 84'
Substitutes:
GK	1	(Bulgaria) Ognyan Vladimirov
DF	2	(Brazil) Hevertton
DF	20	(Spain) Álex Centelles	(substituted on) 57'
DF	55	(Bulgaria) Petko Hristov
MF	10	(Bulgaria) Asen Mitkov	(substituted on) 84'
MF	19	(Morocco) El Mehdi El Moubarik	(substituted on) 57'
MF	22	(France) Mazire Soula	(substituted on) 84'
MF	27	(Angola) David Kusso
FW	9	(Colombia) Juan Perea	(substituted on) 68'	(yellow card) 81'
FW	28	(Bulgaria) Stivan Stoyanchov
FW	77	(Bulgaria) Adrian Raychev
Manager:
(Spain) Julio Velázquez

GK	21	(Belarus) Fyodor Lapoukhov	(yellow card) 90+7'
RWB	2	(Brazil) Pastor	(yellow card) 81'
CB	14	(Bulgaria) Teodor Ivanov (c)
CB	5	(Ivory Coast) Jean-Philippe Gbamin	(yellow card) 84'
CB	4	(Portugal) Dinis Almeida	(yellow card) 45+1'
LWB	17	(Argentina) Ángelo Martino	(yellow card) 82'
CM	99	(Cameroon) James Eto'o		(substituted off) 89'
CM	7	(Belarus) Max Ebong	(red card) 81'
AM	8	(Italy) Stefano Sensi		(substituted off) 90+6'
CF	10	(Netherlands) Joël Zwarts		(substituted off) 86'
CF	28	(Cyprus) Ioannis Pittas		(substituted off) 90+1'
Substitutes:
GK	25	(Bulgaria) Dimitar Evtimov
DF	19	(Bulgaria) Andrey Yordanov	(substituted on) 90+6'
DF	32	(Argentina) Facundo Rodríguez	(substituted on) 85'
DF	37	(Republic of Ireland) Barry Cotter
MF	6	(Portugal) Bruno Jordão	(substituted on) 89'
MF	11	(France) Mohamed Brahimi
MF	30	(Bulgaria) Petko Panayotov
MF	67	(Romania) Cătălin Itu	(substituted on) 90+1'
MF	94	(Central African Republic) Isaac Solet
FW	9	(Argentina) Santiago Godoy	(substituted on) 86'
FW	38	(Brazil) Léo Pereira
Manager:
(Bulgaria) Hristo Yanev				(red card) 90'

Match officials

- Assistant referees:
  - Deniz Sokolov (Sofia)
  - Ivo Kolev (Sofia)
- Fourth official:
  - Lyuboslav Lyubomirov (Pernik)
- Video assistant referee:
  - Nikola Popov (Sofia)
- Assistant video assistant referee:
  - Stanimir Trenchev (Sofia)

Match rules

- 90 minutes.
- No overtime.
- Penalty shoot-out if scores still level.
- Seven named substitutes.
- Maximum of five substitutions. (Note: Each team was given only three opportunities to make substitutions excluding substitutions made at half-time.)
