= Ivaylo Ivanov =

Ivaylo Ivanov may refer to:

- Ivaylo Ivanov (footballer, born 1974), Bulgarian footballer
- Ivaylo Ivanov (footballer, born 2002), Bulgarian footballer
- Ivaylo Ivanov (judoka)
