= 2026–27 First Professional Football League (Bulgaria) =

103rd season of top-tier football league in Bulgaria

First Professional Football League
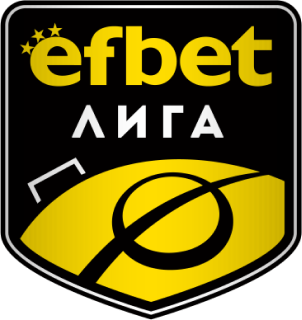
- Season: 2026–27
- Dates: 17 July 2026 – 29 May 2027
- Matches: 103
- Goals: 272 (2.64 per match)
- Top goalscorer: Joël Zwarts (9 goals)
- Best goalkeeper: Ivan Andonov; Fyodor Lapoukhov (Tied at 7 clean sheets)
- Biggest home win: Levski 6–0 Spartak Varna (22 Aug 2026)
- Biggest away win: Lokomotiv Sofia 2–5 Botev Plovdiv (30 Oct 2026)
- Highest scoring: Lokomotiv Sofia 2–5 Botev Plovdiv (30 Oct 2026)
- Longest winning run: 8 games Levski
- Longest unbeaten run: 15 games CSKA Sofia
- Longest winless run: 9 games Lokomotiv Sofia
- Longest losing run: 6 games Septemvri
- All statistics correct as of 17:58, 22 November 2026 (UTC).

The 2026–27 First Professional Football League, also known as efbet League for sponsorship reasons, is the 103rd season of the top division of the Bulgarian football league system, the 79th since a league format was adopted for the national competition of A Group as a top tier of the pyramid, and also the 11th season of the First Professional Football League, which decides the Bulgarian champion. The season began on 17 July 2026 and will end on 29 May 2027.

Levski are the defending champions.

== Teams ==
Location of teams in 2026–27 First League
Location of Sofia teams in 2026–27 First League

For the first time since 2021–22, 14 teams compete in the league this year (reduced from 16). One team was promoted from the 2025–26 Second League, and another place is for the winner of the promotion/relegation play-off.

The only team to earn promotion from the Second League was Dunav, who mathematically secured the Second League championship after drawing against Fratria on 12 May. Dunav returned to the top level after a 6-year absence.

In the promotion/relegation play-off, Septemvri won against Yantra, thus remaining in the First League.

Additionally, this is the first season since 2008–09 without Beroe, as they were relegated after 17 consecutive years in the top flight.

Promoted from 2025–26 Second League	Relegated from 2025–26 First League
Dunav	Beroe; Dobrudzha; Montana

=== Stadiums and locations ===
Team	Location	Stadium	Capacity
Arda	Kardzhali	Arena Arda	12,000
Botev Plovdiv	Plovdiv	Stadion Hristo Botev	18,777
Botev Vratsa	Vratsa	Stadion Hristo Botev	25,000
Cherno More	Varna	Stadion Ticha	8,250
CSKA 1948	Bistritsa	Stadion Bistritsa	3,000
CSKA Sofia	Sofia	Stadion Balgarska Armia; Vasil Levski National Stadium	18,540; 43,230
Dunav	Ruse	Gradski stadion	13,000
Levski	Sofia	Stadion Georgi Asparuhov	17,688
Lokomotiv Plovdiv	Plovdiv	Stadion Hristo Bonev	10,000
Lokomotiv Sofia	Sofia	Stadion Lokomotiv	22,000
Ludogorets	Razgrad	Huvepharma Arena	10,423
Septemvri	Sofia	Vasil Levski National Stadium	43,230
Slavia	Sofia	Stadion Aleksandar Shalamanov	25,000
Spartak Varna	Varna	Stadion Spartak	8,000

=== Personnel and kits ===
Note: Flags indicate national team as has been defined under FIFA eligibility rules. Players and managers may hold more than one non-FIFA nationality.

Team	Manager	Captain	Kit manufacturer	Shirt sponsors	
Team	Manager	Captain	Kit manufacturer	Main	Other(s)
Arda	(Bulgaria) Aleksandar Tunchev	(Bulgaria) Anatoli Gospodinov	Jako	efbet	List: Side: None; Back: IK Nataliya Ltd.; Sleeves: None; Shorts: None; Socks: None
Botev Plovdiv	(Bulgaria) Stanislav Genchev	(Bulgaria) Todor Nedelev	Macron	WinBet	List: Side: None; Back: DallBogg, PIMK; Sleeves: UG Market Trader; Shorts: None; Socks: None
Botev Vratsa	(Bulgaria) Todor Simov	(Bulgaria) Daniel Genov	Erima	WinBet	List: Side: None; Back: None; Sleeves: None; Shorts: None; Socks: None
Cherno More	(Bulgaria) Ilian Iliev	(Bulgaria) Vasil Panayotov	Macron	Armeets	List: Side: None; Back: None; Sleeves: Planex; Shorts: None; Socks: None
CSKA 1948	(Bulgaria) Ognyan Mladenov	(Bolivia) Diego Medina	Jako	efbet	List: Side: None; Back: Bachkovo; Sleeves: BET.bg; Shorts: efbet; Socks: BET.bg
CSKA Sofia	(Germany) Markus Gisdol	(Portugal) Bruno Jordão	Macron	WinBet	List: Side: None; Back: EGT Digital; Sleeves: A1; Shorts: None; Socks: None
Dunav	(Bulgaria) Georgi Chilikov	(Bulgaria) Radoslav Apostolov	Erima	WinBet	List: Side: None; Back: OZK Insurance; Sleeves: None; Shorts: None; Socks: None
Levski	(Spain) Julio Velázquez	(Bulgaria) Kristian Dimitrov	Adidas	8888.bg	List: Side: None; Back: Palms Sport; Sleeves: None; Shorts: None; Socks: None
Lokomotiv Plovdiv	(Slovenia) Dušan Kosič	(Tajikistan) Parvizdzhon Umarbayev	Puma	Sesame	List: Side: None; Back: General Broker Club; Sleeves: None; Shorts: None; Socks: None
Lokomotiv Sofia	(Bulgaria) Atanas Stoilov	(Bulgaria) Krasimir Stanoev	Macron	MrBit	List: Side: None; Back: VIA 2000; Sleeves: None; Shorts: None; Socks: None
Ludogorets	(Croatia) Igor Jovićević	(Bulgaria) Anton Nedyalkov	Jako	Inbet	List: Side: None; Back: Vivacom, Huvepharma; Sleeves: Navibulgar; Shorts: None; Socks: None
Septemvri	(Montenegro) Mladen Kašćelan	(Bulgaria) Galin Ivanov	Uhlsport	8888.bg	List: Side: None; Back: None; Sleeves: None; Shorts: None; Socks: None
Slavia	(Serbia) Ratko Dostanić	(Bulgaria) Ivan Minchev	Joma	8888.bg	List: Side: None; Back: Asset Insurance; Sleeves: None; Shorts: None; Socks: None
Spartak Varna	(Brazil) Daniel Morales	(Bulgaria) Deyan Lozev	Jako	efbet	List: Side: None; Back: None; Sleeves: 100 Tona Fitness Center; Shorts: PRIMEGEAR; Socks: None

Note: Individual clubs may wear jerseys with advertising. However, only one sponsorship is permitted per jersey for official tournaments organised by UEFA in addition to that of the kit manufacturer (exceptions are made for non-profit organisations). Clubs in the domestic league can have more than one sponsorship per jersey which can feature on the front of the shirt, incorporated with the main sponsor or in place of it; or on the back, either below the squad number or on the collar area. Shorts also have space available for advertisement.

=== Managerial changes ===
Team	Outgoing	Manner	Exit date	Position	Incoming	Incoming date	Ref.
Botev Plovdiv	(Bulgaria) Lachezar Baltanov (interim)	End of caretaker spell	27 May 2026	Pre-season	(Bulgaria) Stanislav Genchev	27 May 2026	
Dunav	(Bulgaria) Georgi Chilikov	Resigned	20 May 2026	Pre-season	(Bulgaria) Emanuel Lukanov	1 June 2026	
Lokomotiv Sofia	(Bulgaria) Aleksandar Georgiev (interim)	End of caretaker spell	10 June 2026	Pre-season	(Bulgaria) Lyuboslav Penev	10 June 2026	
Septemvri	(Bulgaria) Hristo Arangelov	End of contract	11 June 2026	Pre-season	(Portugal) Simão Freitas	15 June 2026	
Ludogorets	(Norway) Per-Mathias Høgmo	Mutual agreement	1 July 2026	Pre-season	(Germany) Thomas Reis	12 July 2026	
Spartak Varna	(North Macedonia) Gjoko Hadžievski	Resigned	29 July 2026	3rd	(Bulgaria) Yasen Petrov	31 July 2026	
Spartak Varna	(Bulgaria) Yasen Petrov	Resigned	24 August 2026	8th	(Bulgaria) Vasil Petrov (interim)	25 August 2026	
CSKA 1948	(Bulgaria) Aleksandar Aleksandrov	Sacked	6 September 2026	4th	(Bulgaria) Ognyan Mladenov	6 September 2026	
CSKA Sofia	(Bulgaria) Hristo Yanev	Role change	10 September 2026	3rd	(Brazil) Daniel Morales (interim)	10 September 2026	
Dunav	(Bulgaria) Emanuel Lukanov	Mutual agreement	16 September 2026	14th	(Bulgaria) Georgi Chilikov	17 September 2026	
Ludogorets	(Germany) Thomas Reis	Buyout	17 September 2026	3rd	(Croatia) Igor Jovićević	23 September 2026	
CSKA Sofia	(Brazil) Daniel Morales (interim)	End of caretaker spell	29 September 2026	2nd	(Germany) Markus Gisdol	29 September 2026	
Septemvri	(Portugal) Simão Freitas	Resigned	14 October 2026	13th	(Bulgaria) Mladen Stoev (interim)	14 October 2026	
Septemvri	(Bulgaria) Mladen Stoev (interim)	End of caretaker spell	24 October 2026	13th	(Montenegro) Mladen Kašćelan	24 October 2026	
Lokomotiv Sofia	(Bulgaria) Lyuboslav Penev	Mutual agreement	30 October 2026	12th	(Bulgaria) Atanas Stoilov (interim)	30 October 2026	
Spartak Varna	(Bulgaria) Vasil Petrov (interim)	End of caretaker spell	3 November 2026	8th	(Brazil) Daniel Morales	3 November 2026	
Lokomotiv Sofia	(Bulgaria) Atanas Stoilov (interim)	End of caretaker spell	5 November 2026	13th	(Bulgaria) Aleksandar Georgiev (interim)	5 November 2026	

== Regular season ==
=== League table ===
Pos	Team	Pld	W	D	L	GF	GA	GD	Pts	Qualification
1	CSKA Sofia	15	10	5	0	35	12	+23	35	Qualification for the Championship group
2	Levski Sofia	14	11	2	1	29	9	+20	35	Qualification for the Championship group
3	CSKA 1948	15	9	3	3	34	17	+17	30	Qualification for the Championship group
4	Ludogorets	13	9	3	1	26	11	+15	30	Qualification for the Championship group
5	Botev Plovdiv	15	7	3	5	26	24	+2	24	Qualification for the Conference League group
6	Arda	15	6	4	5	21	23	−2	22	Qualification for the Conference League group
7	Spartak Varna	15	4	5	6	15	25	−10	17	Qualification for the Conference League group
8	Slavia Sofia	15	2	9	4	10	10	0	15	Qualification for the Conference League group
9	Cherno More	15	3	5	7	14	22	−8	14	Qualification for the Relegation group
10	Lokomotiv Plovdiv	15	3	4	8	8	18	−10	13	Qualification for the Relegation group
11	Dunav Ruse	14	3	3	8	16	23	−7	12	Qualification for the Relegation group
12	Septemvri Sofia	15	3	3	9	12	25	−13	12	Qualification for the Relegation group
13	Botev Vratsa	15	2	5	8	12	25	−13	11	Qualification for the Relegation group
14	Lokomotiv Sofia	15	1	6	8	16	30	−14	9	Qualification for the Relegation group

Updated to match(es) played on 22 November 2026. Source: Bulgarian Football
Rules for classification: 1) Points; 2) Head-to-head points; 3) Head-to-head goal difference; 4) Head-to-head goals scored; 5) Head-to-head away goals scored (only if two teams); 6) Goal difference; 7) Goals scored; 8) Fairplay ranking; 9) Draw

=== Positions by round ===
Number = One less match played per underline.
Positions are shown as of the end of the round.

= Qualification for the Championship group; = Qualification for the Conference League group; = Qualification for the Relegation group

Team ╲ Round	1	2	3	4	5	6	7	8	9	10	11	12	13	14	15	16	17	18	19	20	21	22	23	24	25	26
CSKA Sofia	11	5	5	3	2	4	4	3	3	2	2	1	2	1												
Levski	1	2	1	1	4	2	1	1	1	1	1	2	1	2												
Ludogorets	2	1	2	2	1	1	2	2	2	3	3	3	3	3												
CSKA 1948	4	4	4	4	3	3	3	4	4	4	4	4	4	4												
Botev Plovdiv	7	8	6	5	6	6	9	7	6	6	5	5	5	5												
Arda	5	6	7	6	5	5	5	5	5	5	6	6	6	6												
Spartak Varna	3	3	3	7	7	8	7	8	8	8	7	7	8	7												
Slavia	12	13	10	8	8	9	8	6	7	7	8	8	7	8												
Cherno More	9	11	12	12	13	10	10	12	12	13	14	13	9	9												
Lokomotiv Plovdiv	14	7	8	9	11	13	14	11	11	12	11	11	12	10												
Dunav	13	14	14	14	10	12	12	13	14	14	10	9	10	11												
Septemvri	6	12	13	13	9	7	6	9	10	10	13	14	14	12												
Botev Vratsa	8	9	11	11	14	11	11	10	9	9	9	10	11	13												
Lokomotiv Sofia	10	10	9	10	12	14	13	14	13	11	12	12	13	14												

Updated to match(es) played on 8 November 2026. Source: Bulgarian-football.com (in Bulgarian)

=== Results by round ===
Results are shown in order of play.
Rescheduled results are underlined, with their original round being shown as superscript.

Team ╲ Round	1	2	3	4	5	6	7	8	9	10	11	12	13	14	15	16	17	18	19	20	21	22	23	24	25	26
CSKA Sofia	D	W	W	W	W	W	D	W	W^{6}	D	W	W	D	W	D											
Levski	W	W	W	W	W	W	W^{5}	W	D	W	D	W	L	W												
Ludogorets	W	W	W	W	W	D	D	W	W	W	L	W	D													
CSKA 1948	D	W	W	W	W	L	W	L	W	W	L	W	W	D	D											
Botev Plovdiv	D	L	W	W	L	L	L	W	W	W	W	L	W	D	D											
Arda	D	W	L	W	W	W	W	L	L	D	L	D	W	L	D											
Spartak Varna	D	W	W	L	L	L	D	D	D	L	W	L	L	W	D											
Slavia	D	L	D	W	D	D	L^{5}	W	D	L	L	D	D	D	D											
Cherno More	D	L	L	L	L	W	L	L	D	D	L	W	W	D	D											
Lokomotiv Plovdiv	L	W	L	L	L	L	L	W	L	D	D	D	L	W	D											
Dunav	L	L	L	L	W	L	D	L	L	D	W	W	L	D												
Septemvri	D	L	L	L	W	W	D	L	L	L	L	L	L	W	D											
Botev Vratsa	D	L	L	L	L	W	L	W	D	D	L	D	L	L	D											
Lokomotiv Sofia	D	L	D	L	L	D	L	D	L^{6}	W	D	D	L	L	L											

Updated to match(es) played on 21 November 2026. Source: Bulgarian-football.com (in Bulgarian)
W = Win; D = Draw; L = Loss

=== Results ===
Home \ Away	ARD	BPD	BVR	CHM	CSK	CSS	DUN	LEV	LPD	LSO	LUD	SEP	SLA	SPV
Arda	—	2–3	2–0	1–1	29 Nov		6 Dec	1–1		3–1		2–1	1–0	
Botev Plovdiv		—		1–0		3–3	1–1	1–3	2–0	1–1			1–0	3–2
Botev Vratsa		1–0	—	1–1	1–1			0–0	1–2		28 Nov		0–3	0–1
Cherno More		28 Nov	1–0	—			3–1	0–2		2–2	2–3	2–0		0–3
CSKA 1948	2–1	4–0	2–1	4–1	—	2–3	2–1		2–0	5 Dec				6–1
CSKA Sofia	4–1	3–2	5–0	3–1		—	2–1	a			2–0	5 Dec	0–0	
Dunav	0–2		2–2			1 Dec	—	0–1		2–2	0–2		0–1	2–0
Levski					1–0	0–3	2–1	—	2–0	4–1	3 Dec	3–0	a	6–0
Lokomotiv Plovdiv	0–1	a		1–0		1–1	1–2	6 Dec	—	a	0–3	2–1	0–0	28 Nov
Lokomotiv Sofia		2–5	1–1		1–3	0–2		1–2	1–1	—	1–2		27 Nov	
Ludogorets	5–0	2–0	2–1	7 Dec	2–2		23 Nov		1–0		—	2–1	1–1	
Septemvri	1–1	0–3	2–3		1–0	0–3	2–3	29 Nov	0–0	1–0		—		
Slavia	1–1		4 Dec	0–0	1–2	0–0		1–2		1–1		1–1	—	0–0
Spartak Varna	3–2	6 Dec		0–0	2–2	1–1			1–0	0–1	1–1	0–1		—

Updated to match(es) played on 22 November 2026. Source: Bulgarian Football
Legend: Blue = home team win; Yellow = draw; Red = away team win.
For upcoming matches, an "a" indicates there is an article about the rivalry between the two participants.

=== Rescheduled matches ===
Round	Home team	Away team	Original date	New date	Reason	Ref.
1	Botev Plovdiv	Lokomotiv Sofia	20 Jul 2026	21 Jul 2026	Match was postponed by 24 hours after 5 minutes of game time, due to the pitch flooding caused by adverse weather.	
5	Slavia	Levski	15 Aug 2026	2 Sep 2026	Match was postponed after an official request by Levski, due to their Champions League play-off match against AEK Athens.	
6	Lokomotiv Sofia	CSKA Sofia	23 Aug 2026	16 Sep 2026	Match was postponed after an official request by CSKA Sofia, due to their Europa League play-off match against OFI.	
7	Botev Plovdiv	Levski	29 Aug 2026	30 Aug 2026	Match was postponed by 24 hours after an official request by Levski.	
10	Levski	Ludogorets	20 Sep 2026	3 Dec 2026	Match was postponed after an official request by Levski.	
13	All teams		30 Oct – 2 Nov 2026	6–8 Nov 2026	All Round 13 matches were rescheduled for 6–8 November, while Round 14 matches instead took place between 30 October and 2 November due to a clash with the 2026 Bulgarian presidential election and insufficient police resources to provide security for the Eternal derby.	
14	All teams		6–8 Nov 2026	30 Oct – 2 Nov 2026	All Round 13 matches were rescheduled for 6–8 November, while Round 14 matches instead took place between 30 October and 2 November due to a clash with the 2026 Bulgarian presidential election and insufficient police resources to provide security for the Eternal derby.	
14	CSKA Sofia	Slavia	30 Oct 2026	31 Oct 2026	Match date was moved forward by 1 day, in relation to an official request by CSKA Sofia.	
14	Lokomotiv Sofia	Botev Plovdiv	31 Oct 2026	30 Oct 2026	Match date was moved back by 1 day, in relation to an official request by CSKA Sofia.	
14	Lokomotiv Plovdiv	Ludogorets	31 Oct 2026	31 Oct 2026	Match starting hour was moved back by 1 hour, from 3PM to 2PM, in relation to an official request by CSKA Sofia.	
14	Dunav	Levski	31 Oct 2026	31 Oct 2026	Match starting hour was moved back by 1 hour, from 5:30PM to 4:30PM, in relation to an official request by CSKA Sofia.	
14	Cherno More	Botev Vratsa	2 Nov 2026	2 Nov 2026	Match starting hour was moved forward by 1 and a half hours, from 5PM to 6:30PM, due to partial pitch flooding.	
16	Dunav Ruse	CSKA Sofia	29 Nov 2026	1 Dec 2026	Match was postponed after an official request by CSKA Sofia, due to their Conference League match against Trabzonspor.	
16	Arda	CSKA 1948	29 Nov 2026	29 Nov 2026	Match starting hour was moved forward by 1 hour, from 12:30PM to 1:30PM, due to a request by the broadcaster.	
16	Septemvri	Levski	29 Nov 2026	29 Nov 2026	Match starting hour was moved forward by 1 hour, from 3PM to 4PM, due to a request by the broadcaster.	

== Season statistics ==
=== Scoring ===
- First goal of the season:
  (North Macedonia) Georg Stojanovski (Spartak Varna) against CSKA 1948 (17 July 2026)

=== Top goalscorers ===
As of 22 November 2026

Rank	Player	Club	Goals
1	(Royal Dutch Football Association) Joël Zwarts	CSKA Sofia	9
2	(Brazilian Football Confederation) Elias Franco	CSKA 1948	7
2	(Bulgarian Football Union) Atanas Iliev	CSKA 1948	7
2	(Cyprus Football Association) Ioannis Pittas	CSKA Sofia	7
5	(Bulgarian Football Union) Asen Chandarov	Botev Plovdiv	6
5	(Bulgarian Football Union) Ivaylo Chochev	Ludogorets	6
5	(Brazilian Football Confederation) Rwan Cruz	Ludogorets	6
8	(Argentine Football Association) Santiago Godoy	CSKA Sofia	5
8	(Bulgarian Football Union) Birsent Karagaren	Arda	5
8	(Portuguese Football Federation) Frédéric Maciel	CSKA 1948	5
8	(Ghana Football Association) Bernard Tekpetey	Ludogorets	5
12	(Football Federation of the Islamic Republic of Mauritania) Mamadou Diallo	CSKA 1948	4
12	(Nigeria Football Federation) Samuel Kalu	Botev Plovdiv	4
12	(Brazilian Football Confederation) Franklin Mascote	Botev Plovdiv	4
12	(Football Association of Ireland) Armstrong Oko-Flex	Levski	4
12	(Colombian Football Federation) Juan Perea	Levski	4
12	(Brazilian Football Confederation) Reinaldo	Levski	4
12	(Bulgarian Football Union) Samuil Tsonov	Botev Plovdiv	4
12	(Royal Spanish Football Federation) Alex Valiño	Dunav	4

==== Hat-tricks ====
As of 22 November 2026

Rnd	Player	Club	Goals	Date	Home	Score	Away	Ref.
14	(Brazilian Football Confederation) Franklin Mascote	Botev Plovdiv	2', 41', 74'	30 October 2026	Lokomotiv Sofia	2–5	Botev Plovdiv	

=== Clean sheets ===
As of 22 November 2026

==== Player ====
Rank	Goalkeeper	Club	Clean sheets
1	(Bulgarian Football Union) Ivan Andonov	Slavia	7
1	(Football Federation of Belarus) Fyodor Lapoukhov	CSKA Sofia	7
3	(German Football Association) Hendrik Bonmann	Ludogorets	5
3	(Bulgarian Football Union) Plamen Iliev	Spartak Varna	5
3	(Bulgarian Football Union) Svetoslav Vutsov	Levski	5
6	(Bulgarian Football Union) Anatoli Gospodinov	Arda	4
6	(Bulgarian Football Union) Vladimir Ivanov	Septemvri	4
6	(Bulgarian Football Union) Daniel Naumov	Botev Plovdiv	4
6	(Bulgarian Football Union) Kristian Tomov	Cherno More	4
10	(Swiss Football Association) Bojan Milosavljević	Lokomotiv Plovdiv	3

==== Team ====
- Most clean sheets: 7
  - CSKA Sofia
  - Levski
  - Slavia

=== Discipline ===
As of 20 November 2026

==== Player ====
- Most yellow cards: 7
  - (Bulgaria) Ivan Goranov (Botev Vratsa)
- Most red cards: 1
  - (Cyprus) Kyriakos Antoniou (Dunav)
  - (Bulgaria) Zhivko Atanasov (Cherno More)
  - (Brazil) Emerson Barbosa (CSKA 1948)
  - (Algeria) Idris Bounaas (Cherno More)
  - (Colombia) José Cabarcas (Dunav)
  - (Brazil) Rwan Cruz (Ludogorets)
  - (Bulgaria) Viktor Dobrev (Septemvri)
  - (Bulgaria) Ivan Goranov (Botev Vratsa)
  - (Germany) André Hoffmann (CSKA 1948)
  - (Romania) Cătălin Itu (CSKA Sofia)
  - (Bulgaria) Galin Ivanov (Septemvri)
  - (Bulgaria) Ivaylo Ivanov (Lokomotiv Plovdiv)
  - (Bulgaria) Bozhidar Katsarov (Lokomotiv Sofia)
  - (France) Julien Lamy (Lokomotiv Plovdiv)
  - (Mozambique) David Malembana (Slavia)
  - (Bulgaria) Georgi Nikolov (Arda)
  - (Portugal) Vasco Oliveira (Spartak Varna)
  - (Portugal) Edney Ribeiro (Septemvri)
  - (Colombia) Emerson Rodríguez (Ludogorets)
  - (Italy) Stefano Sensi (CSKA Sofia)

==== Team ====
- Most yellow cards: 42
  - Cherno More
- Fewest yellow cards: 15
  - Levski
- Most red cards: 3
  - Septemvri
- Fewest red cards: 0
  - Botev Plovdiv
  - Levski
