= Nikola Serafimov =

Macedonian footballer

Personal information
- Date of birth: 11 August 1999 (age 27)
- Place of birth: Skopje, Macedonia
- Height: 1.93 m (6 ft 4 in)
- Position: Centre-back

Team information
- Current team: Levski Sofia
- Number: 31

Youth career
- 2011–2017: Vardar

Senior career*
Years	Team	Apps	(Gls)
2017–2020	Vardar	15	(0)
2017	→ Pelister (loan)	3	(0)
2018–2019	→ Bregalnica (loan)	22	(1)
2020–2021	Akademija Pandev	25	(0)
2021–2022	Zalaegerszegi	31	(4)
2022–2025	Fehérvár	64	(3)
2025–	Levski Sofia	19	(1)

International career^{‡}
2019–2020	Macedonia U21	7	(0)
2022–	North Macedonia	29	(1)
- * Club domestic league appearances and goals as of 27 October 2026 ‡ National team caps and goals as of 15:31, 4 July 2026 (UTC)

Nikola Serafimov (Macedonian: Никола Серафимов; born 11 August 1999) is a Macedonian professional footballer who plays as a centre-back for Bulgarian First League club Levski Sofia and the North Macedonia national team.

== Club career ==
Serafimov started his football career at the Vardar academy. After being promoted to the senior team, Vardar loaned him out to Pelister in 2017 and Bregalnica in 2018, respectively. He spent one season with Vardar, winning the 2019–20 Macedonian league title.

On 7 July 2020, he joined Akademija Pandev.

On 21 June 2021, Serafimov transferred to Zalaegerszegi TE in the Hungarian NB I. After impressing in his first season, on 11 July 2022, he signed with fellow NB I club Fehérvár FC for a fee of €400,000. Serafimov scored his first goal for Fehérvár in the 66th minute of their 2–1 defeat to Újpest FC on 9 November 2022.

On 15 August 2025, Serafimov joined Bulgarian First League club Levski Sofia on a three-year deal.

== International career ==
In August 2021, Serafimov received his debut call up for the senior North Macedonia national team in the 2022 FIFA World Cup qualification games against Armenia, Iceland and Romania.

He played throughout North Macedonia's 2022 UEFA Nations League campaign against Bulgaria, Gibraltar and Georgia.

On 14 November 2024, Serafimov scored his first goal for the national team in a 1–0 win against Latvia.

== Career statistics ==
=== Club ===
As of 25 May 2026

Appearances and goals by club, season and competition
Club	Season	League			National cup (Note: Includes Macedonian Cup, Magyar Kupa and Bulgarian Cup)		Continental		Other		Total	
Club	Season	Division	Apps	Goals	Apps	Goals	Apps	Goals	Apps	Goals	Apps	Goals
Vardar	2017–18	1. MFL	3	0	0	0	0	0	—		3	0
Vardar	2018–19	1. MFL	0	0	0	0	0	0	—		0	0
Vardar	2019–20	1. MFL	12	0	0	0	—		—		12	0
Vardar	Total		15	0	0	0	0	0	—		15	0
Pelister (loan)	2017–18	1. MFL	3	0	0	0	—		—		3	0
Bregalnica (loan)	2018–19	2. MFL East	0	0	0	0	—		—		0	0
Akademija Pandev	2020–21	1. MFL	25	0	0	0	—		—		25	0
Zalaegerszegi TE	2021–22	Nemzeti Bajnokság I	31	4	2	0	—		—		33	4
Fehérvár	2022–23	Nemzeti Bajnokság I	11	1	1	0	2 (Note: Appearances in UEFA Conference League)	0	—		14	1
Fehérvár	2023–24	Nemzeti Bajnokság I	30	1	0	0	—		—		30	1
Fehérvár	2024–25	Nemzeti Bajnokság I	23	1	2	0	4	0	—		29	1
Fehérvár	Total		64	3	3	0	6	0	—		73	3
Levski Sofia	2025–26	Bulgarian First League	15	1	3	1	0	0	0	0	18	2
Levski Sofia	2026–27	Bulgarian First League	0	0	0	0	0	0	0	0	0	0
Levski Sofia	Total		15	1	3	1	0	0	0	0	18	2
Career total			153	8	8	1	6	0	0	0	167	9

=== International ===
As of match played 1 June 2026

Appearances and goals by national team and year
National team	Year	Apps	Goals
North Macedonia
North Macedonia	2022	5	0
North Macedonia	2023	7	0
North Macedonia	2024	8	1
North Macedonia	2025	6	0
North Macedonia	2026	3	0
Total		29	1

Scores and results list North Macedonia's goal tally first, score column indicates score after each Serafimov goal.

List of international goals scored by Nikola Serafimov
No.	Date	Venue	Opponent	Score	Result	Competition
1	14 November 2024	Toše Proeski Arena, Skopje, North Macedonia	Latvia	1–0	1–0	2024–25 UEFA Nations League C

== Honours ==
Vardar

- Macedonian First League: 2019–20

Levski Sofia

- Bulgarian First League: 2025–26
