= Ognyan Vladimirov =

Bulgarian footballer

Personal information
- Full name: Ognyan Dilyanov Vladimirov
- Date of birth: 24 January 2008 (age 18)
- Place of birth: Sofia, Bulgaria
- Height: 1.80 m (5 ft 11 in)
- Position: Goalkeeper

Team information
- Current team: Levski Sofia
- Number: 1

Youth career
- 2014–2026: Levski Sofia

Senior career*
Years	Team	Apps	(Gls)
2023–2026	Levski Sofia II	34	(0)
2026–	Levski Sofia	6	(0)

International career^{‡}
2024–2025	Bulgaria U17	3	(0)
2026–	Bulgaria U19	3	(0)
- * Club domestic league appearances and goals as of 15:22, 22 November 2026 (UTC) ‡ National team caps and goals as of 13:23, 21 July 2026 (UTC)

Ognyan Dilyanov Vladimirov (Bulgarian: Огнян Дилянов Владимиров; born 24 January 2008) is a Bulgarian professional footballer who plays as a goalkeeper for Bulgarian First League club Levski Sofia.

== Career ==
Vladimirov joined Levski Sofia's youth academy at the age of 6, initially alternating between goalkeeper and left winger positions before permanently settling as a goalkeeper. In July 2024, he signed his first professional contract with the club. After 34 appearances with the B team in the Third League, Vladimirov was promoted to the senior team for the 2025–26 season. On 25 May 2026, he made his professional debut in a league match against CSKA 1948, keeping a clean sheet.

== Career statistics ==
As of match played 11 October 2026

Appearances and goals by club, season and competition
Club	Season	League			National cup (Note: Includes Bulgarian Cup)		Continental		Other		Total	
Club	Season	Division	Apps	Goals	Apps	Goals	Apps	Goals	Apps	Goals	Apps	Goals
Levski Sofia II	2023–24	Bulgarian Third League	0	0	—		—		—		0	0
Levski Sofia II	2024–25	Bulgarian Third League	3	0	—		—		—		3	0
Levski Sofia II	2025–26	Bulgarian Third League	31	0	—		—		—		31	0
Levski Sofia II	Total		34	0	0	0	0	0	0	0	34	0
Levski Sofia	2025–26	Bulgarian First League	1	0	0	0	0	0	0	0	1	0
Levski Sofia	2026–27	Bulgarian First League	2	0	0	0	0	0	0	0	2	0
Career total			37	0	0	0	0	0	0	0	37	0

== Honours ==
Levski Sofia

- Bulgarian First League: 2025–26
