= Stivan Stoyanchov =

Bulgarian footballer

Personal information
- Full name: Stivan Yordanov Stoyanchov
- Date of birth: 18 September 2007 (age 19)
- Place of birth: Pernik, Bulgaria
- Height: 1.92 m (6 ft 3 1/2 in)
- Position: Forward

Team information
- Current team: Levski Sofia
- Number: 28

Youth career
- 2018–2024: Levski Sofia

Senior career*
Years	Team	Apps	(Gls)
2024–2025	Levski Sofia II	35	(11)
2025–	Levski Sofia	7	(1)
2025–2026	→ Etar (loan)	27	(11)

International career^{‡}
2024	Bulgaria U17	3	(0)
2025	Bulgaria U19	7	(1)
2026–	Bulgaria U21	4	(1)
- * Club domestic league appearances and goals as of 17:11, 8 November 2026 (UTC) ‡ National team caps and goals as of 21:01, 5 November 2026 (UTC)

Stivan Yordanov Stoyanchov (Bulgarian: Стивън Йорданов Стоянчов; born 18 September 2007) is a Bulgarian professional footballer who plays as a forward for First League club Levski Sofia.

== Club career ==
Stoyanchov joined the youth academy of Levski Sofia at a young age in 2018 and progressed through the various youth categories of the club's academy. During the 2024–25 season, he became a regular member of the Levski Sofia II squad in the Third League. On 12 August 2025, he signed his first professional contract, for three years.

On 19 August 2025, Stoyanchov had joined Second League club Etar Veliko Tarnovo, on a season-long loan for the 2025–26 season. He made 27 league appearances for the club, scoring 11 goals and was voted Etar Player of the Season.

Stoyanchov returned to Levski in June 2026. He made his First League debut in a 2–1 win over Dunav Ruse at Stadion Georgi Asparuhov on 17 July 2026, in the club's first game of the 2026–27 First League season. On 22 August, he scored his first goal for Levski in a 6–0 home victory over Spartak Varna.

== Career statistics ==
As of match played 5 November 2026

Appearances and goals by club, season and competition
Club	Season	League			National cup		Europe		Other		Total	
Club	Season	Division	Apps	Goals	Apps	Goals	Apps	Goals	Apps	Goals	Apps	Goals
Levski Sofia II	2023–24	Third League	1	0	—		—		—		1	0
Levski Sofia II	2024–25	Third League	31	11	—		—		—		31	11
Levski Sofia II	2025–26	Third League	3	0	—		—		—		3	0
Levski Sofia II	Total		35	11	—		—		—		35	11
Etar (loan)	2025–26	Second League	27	11	0	0	—		—		27	11
Levski Sofia	2026–27	First League	6	1	0	0	6 (Note: Four appearances in UEFA Champions League, two appearances and one goal in UEFA Europa League)	1	—		12	2
Career total			68	23	0	0	6	1	0	0	74	24
