= 2026–27 Bulgarian Elite Cup =

Купа на Елита Bethub Pro Cup

Tournament details
- Country: Bulgaria
- Teams: 8

Tournament statistics
- Matches played: 2
- Goals scored: 3 (1.5 per match)
- Top goal scorer: three players (1 goal)
- All statistics correct as of 21 October 2026.

The 2026–27 Bulgarian Elite Cup is the inaugural edition of the Bulgarian second annual football knockout tournament. It is sponsored by Bethub and is known as the Bethub Pro Cup for sponsorship purposes. The competition began on 14 October 2026 with the quarterfinals and will finish with the final on 7 April 2027.

== Qualified teams ==
The first eight teams from the 2025–26 First League season qualified for the tournament.

Pos	Team	Qualification
1	Levski Sofia	Qualified
2	CSKA 1948	Qualified
3	Ludogorets	Declined participation
4	CSKA Sofia	Qualified
5	Lokomotiv Plovdiv	Qualified
6	Arda	Qualified
7	Cherno More	Qualified
8	Botev Plovdiv	Qualified
9	Botev Vratsa	Qualified
10	Lokomotiv Sofia	Did not qualify
11	Slavia Sofia	Did not qualify
12	Spartak Varna	Did not qualify
13	Septemvri Sofia	Did not qualify
14	Beroe	Did not qualify
15	Dobrudzha	Did not qualify
16	Montana	Did not qualify

== Draw ==
The draw for the tournament took place on 15 September 2026. The host of each game will be the club with the higher average attendance during the ongoing 2026–27 season.

== Bracket ==
Quarterfinals
Levski Sofia
Arda
Cherno More	0
Lokomotiv Plovdiv	1
Botev Plovdiv	2
Botev Vratsa	0
CSKA Sofia
CSKA 1948

Semifinals
Lokomotiv Plovdiv
Botev Plovdiv

Final

== Quarterfinals ==
14 October 2026	Botev Plovdiv	2–0	Botev Vratsa	Plovdiv
19:00 UTC+3	Mascote 17'; Meotti 69'	Report		Stadium: Stadion Hristo Botev; Referee: Volen Chinkov (Sofia)

21 October 2026	Cherno More	0–1	Lokomotiv Plovdiv	Varna
18:30 UTC+3		Report	D. Ali 12'	Stadium: Stadion Ticha; Referee: Martin Markov (Sofia)

6 February 2027	Levski Sofia	v	Arda	Sofia
--:-- UTC+2				Stadium: Stadion Georgi Asparuhov

7 February 2027	CSKA Sofia	v	CSKA 1948	Sofia
--:-- UTC+2				Stadium: Stadion Balgarska Armia
