= Diego Medina (footballer, born 2002) =

Bolivian footballer

Personal information
- Full name: Diego Daniel Medina Roman
- Date of birth: 13 January 2002 (age 24)
- Place of birth: Santa Cruz de la Sierra, Bolivia
- Height: 1.75 m (5 ft 9 in)
- Positions: Right-back; centre-back

Team information
- Current team: CSKA 1948
- Number: 2

Youth career
- 2010–2021: Tahuichi FC

Senior career*
Years	Team	Apps	(Gls)
2021–2025	Always Ready	116	(2)
2025–	CSKA 1948	30	(0)

International career^{‡}
2022–	Bolivia	35	(0)
- * Club domestic league appearances and goals as of 19:16, 19 September 2026 (UTC) ‡ National team caps and goals as of 22:55, 30 September 2026 (UTC)

Diego Daniel Medina Roman (born 13 January 2002) is a Bolivian professional footballer who plays as a right-back and center-back for Bulgarian First League club CSKA 1948 Sofia and the Bolivia national team.

== Career ==
Medina is a youth product of the academy of Tahuichi FC since the age of 8. He moved to Always Ready in 2021, and began his senior career in the Bolivian Primera División.

On 13 July 2025, Medina signed a contract with Bulgarian First League club CSKA 1948 Sofia.

== International career ==
Medina made his debut for the Bolivia national team in a 2–0 friendly loss to Senegal on 24 September 2022.

In June 2024, he took part in the Maurice Revello Tournament in France against Mexico.[clarification needed]

== Career statistics ==
=== Club ===
As of match played 19 September 2026

Appearances and goals by club, season and competition
Club	Season	League			National Cup		Continental		Other		Total	
Club	Season	Division	Apps	Goals	Apps	Goals	Apps	Goals	Apps	Goals	Apps	Goals
Always Ready	2021	FBF División Profesional	9	0	0	0	0	0	—		9	0
Always Ready	2022	FBF División Profesional	36	2	0	0	1 (Note: Appearances in Copa Libertadores)	0	—		37	2
Always Ready	2023	FBF División Profesional	28	0	11	0	2	0	—		41	0
Always Ready	2024	FBF División Profesional	34	0	0	0	12	0	—		46	0
Always Ready	2025	FBF División Profesional	9	0	2	0	—		—		11	0
Always Ready	Total		116	0	13	0	15	0	—		144	0
CSKA 1948	2025–26	First League	23	0	2	0	—		—		25	0
CSKA 1948	2026–27	First League	7	0	0	0	4 (Note: Appearances in UEFA Conference League)	0	—		11	0
CSKA 1948	Total		30	0	2	0	4	0	—		36	0
Career total			146	2	15	0	19	0	0	0	180	2

=== International ===
As of match played 30 September 2026

Appearances and goals by national team and year
National team	Year	Apps	Goals
Bolivia	2022	2	0
Bolivia	2023	7	0
Bolivia	2024	11	0
Bolivia	2025	10	0
Bolivia	2026	5	0
Total		35	0
