= Álex Centelles =

Spanish footballer

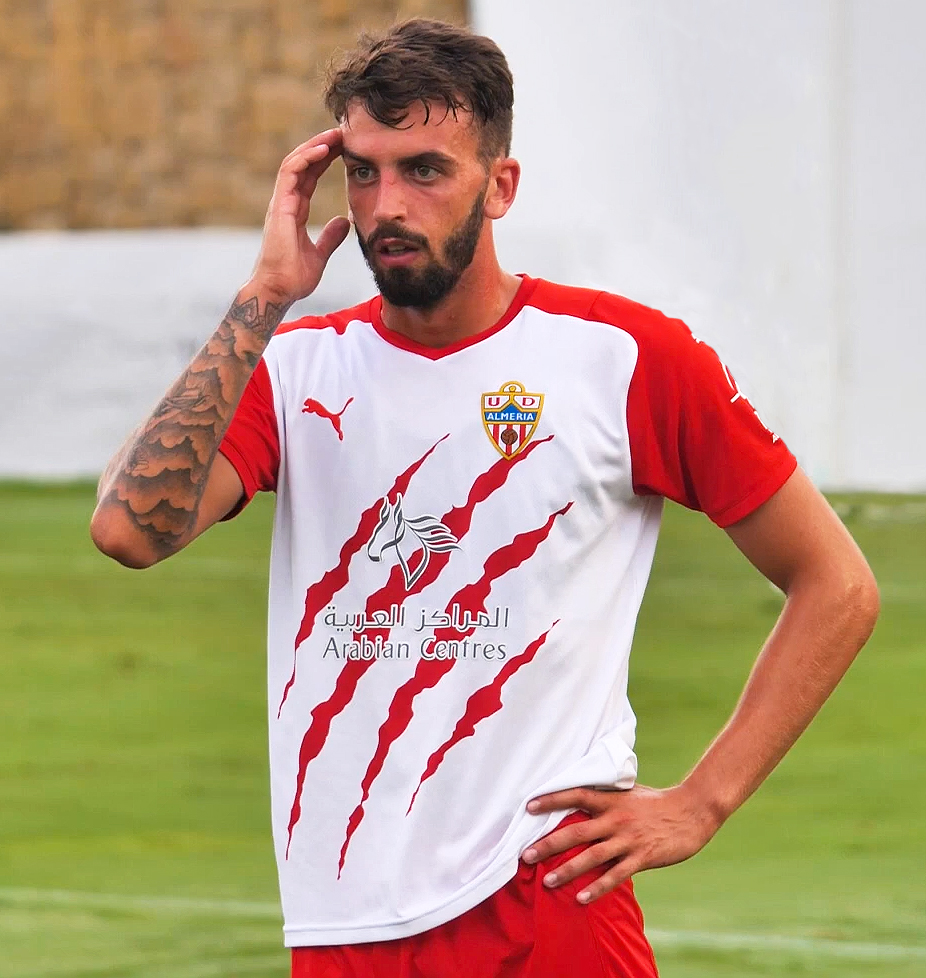

Personal information
- Full name: Alejandro Centelles Plaza
- Date of birth: 30 August 1999 (age 27)
- Place of birth: Valencia, Spain
- Height: 1.85 m (6 ft 1 in)
- Position: Left-back

Team information
- Current team: Levski Sofia
- Number: 20

Youth career
- 2004–2007: Crack's
- 2007–2017: Valencia

Senior career*
Years	Team	Apps	(Gls)
2017–2019	Valencia B	66	(0)
2019–2020	Valencia	0	(0)
2019–2020	→ Famalicão (loan)	27	(0)
2020–2026	Almería	122	(3)
2026–	Levski Sofia	11	(1)

International career
2016	Spain U17	2	(0)
2018	Spain U19	2	(0)
- * Club domestic league appearances and goals as of 8 November 2026

Alejandro "Álex" Centelles Plaza (born 30 August 1999) is a Spanish professional footballer who plays as a left-back for Bulgarian First League club Levski Sofia.

== Club career ==
Born in Valencia, Centelles joined Valencia CF's youth setup at the age of eight, from CF Crack's. After spending the whole 2017 pre-season with the first team, he was subsequently assigned to the reserves in Segunda División B on 2 August.

Centelles made his senior debut on 20 August 2017, starting in a 2–0 away win against Deportivo Aragón. The following 24 May, after being an ever-present figure for the B-team during the campaign, he signed a new contract until 2021.

On 1 July 2019, Centelles joined Primeira Liga newcomers F.C. Famalicão on loan for one year. He made his professional debut on 14 September, starting in a 4–2 home defeat of F.C. Paços de Ferreira.

On 2 October 2020, Centelles signed a two-year contract with Segunda División side UD Almería.

On 24 June 2026, upon expiration of his Almería contract, Centelles joined Bulgarian First League champions Levski Sofia on a three-year deal.

== Personal life ==
Centelles' father José was also a footballer, and also represented Valencia Mestalla.

== Career statistics ==
=== Club ===
As of 24 May 2026

Appearances and goals by club, season and competition
Club	Season	League			National cup (Note: Includes Copa del Rey, Taça de Portugal and Bulgarian Cup)		League cup		Continental		Other		Total	
Club	Season	Division	Apps	Goals	Apps	Goals	Apps	Goals	Apps	Goals	Apps	Goals	Apps	Goals
Valencia B	2017–18	Segunda División B	36	0	—		—		—		—		36	0
Valencia B	2018–19	Segunda División B	30	0	—		—		—		—		30	0
Valencia B	Total		66	0	—		—		—		—		66	0
Famalicão (loan)	2019–20	Primeira Liga	27	0	3	0	0	0	—		—		30	0
Valencia	2020–21	La Liga	0	0	—		—		—		—		0	0
Almería	2020–21	La Liga 2	13	0	1	0	—		—		1 (Note: Appearances in La Liga play-offs)	0	15	0
Almería	2021–22	La Liga 2	22	0	1	0	—		—		—		23	0
Almería	2022–23	La Liga	15	1	1	0	—		—		—		16	1
Almería	2023–24	La Liga	14	0	1	0	—		—		—		15	0
Almería	2024–25	La Liga 2	36	2	4	0	—		—		2	0	42	2
Almería	2025–26	La Liga 2	22	0	2	0	—		—		0	0	24	0
Almería	Total		122	3	10	0	—		—		3	0	135	3
Levski Sofia	2026–27	Bulgarian First League	0	0	0	0	—		0	0	0	0	0	0
Career total			215	3	13	0	0	0	0	0	3	0	231	3
