= David Kusso =

Angolan footballer

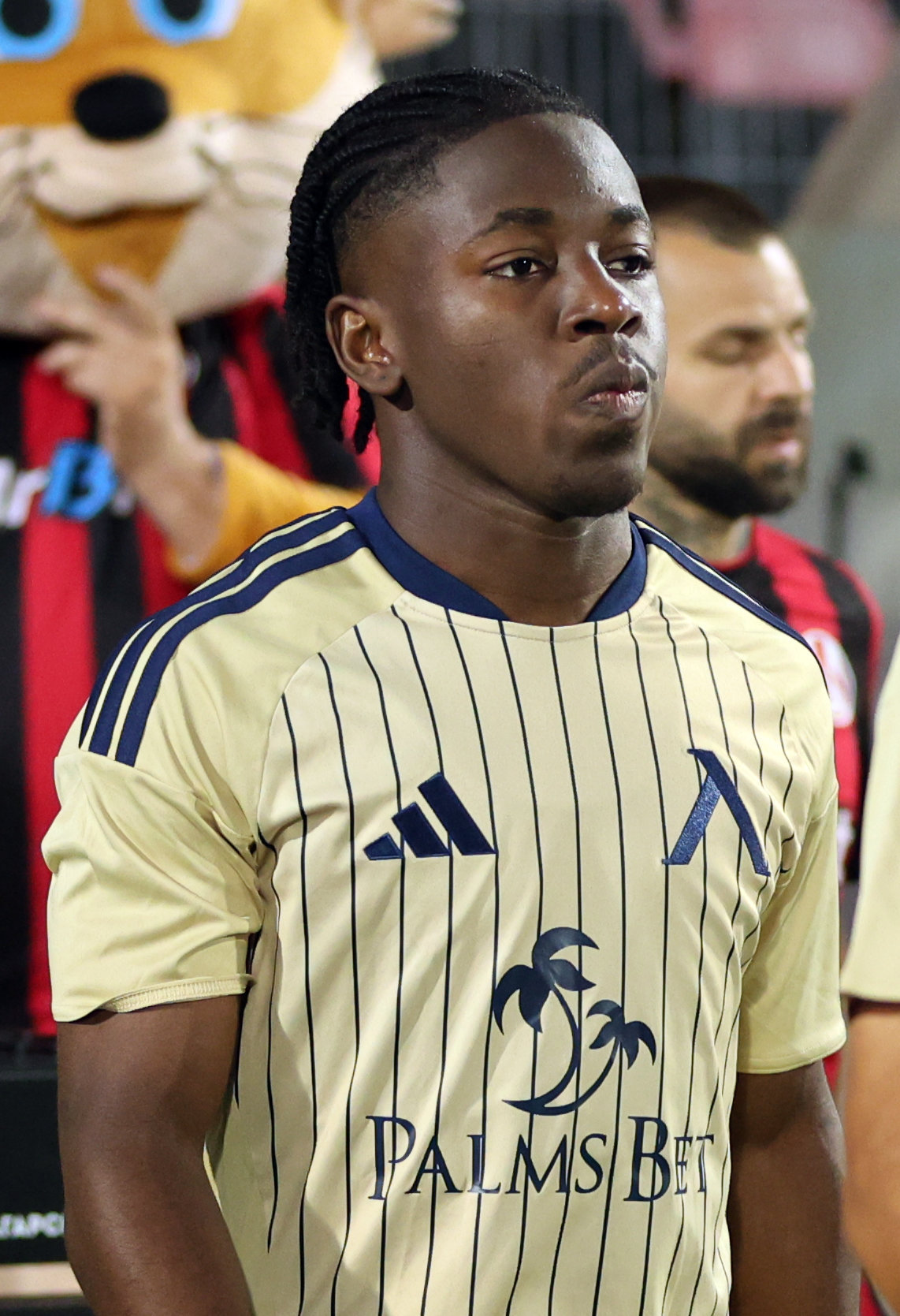

Personal information
- Full name: David João Kusso
- Date of birth: 22 January 2004 (age 22)
- Place of birth: Luanda, Angola
- Height: 1.73 m (5 ft 8 in)
- Positions: Winger; left-back

Team information
- Current team: Levski Sofia
- Number: 27

Youth career
- Chaves

Senior career*
Years	Team	Apps	(Gls)
2024–2026	Chaves	38	(5)
2025	→ Sanjoanense (loan)	12	(1)
2026–	Levski Sofia	6	(2)
- * Club domestic league appearances and goals as of 19:28, 2 September 2026 (UTC)

David João Kusso (born 22 January 2004) is an Angolan professional footballer who plays as a winger and left-back for Bulgarian First League club Levski Sofia.

== Career ==
Born in Angola, Kusso moved to Portugal and France at a young age and began his career at Chaves. Kusso holds both French and Portuguese nationalities.

On 5 June 2026, he joined Levski Sofia in the Bulgarian First League, becoming the first ever Angolan footballer to play for the club.

== Career statistics ==
As of 15 May 2026

Appearances and goals by club, season and competition
Club	Season	League			National cup (Note: Includes Taça de Portugal and Bulgarian Cup)		Continental		Other		Total	
Club	Season	Division	Apps	Goals	Apps	Goals	Apps	Goals	Apps	Goals	Apps	Goals
Chaves	2024–25	Liga Portugal 2	10	0	2	0	—		—		12	0
Chaves	2025–26	Liga Portugal 2	28	5	2	0	—		—		30	5
Chaves	Total		38	5	4	0	—		—		42	5
Sanjoanense	2024–25	Liga 3	12	1	0	0	—		—		12	1
Levski Sofia	2026–27	Bulgarian First League	0	0	0	0	0	0	0 (Note: Appearance in Bulgarian Supercup)	0	0	0
Career total			50	6	4	0	0	0	0	0	54	6
