= Aldair Neves =

Portuguese footballer

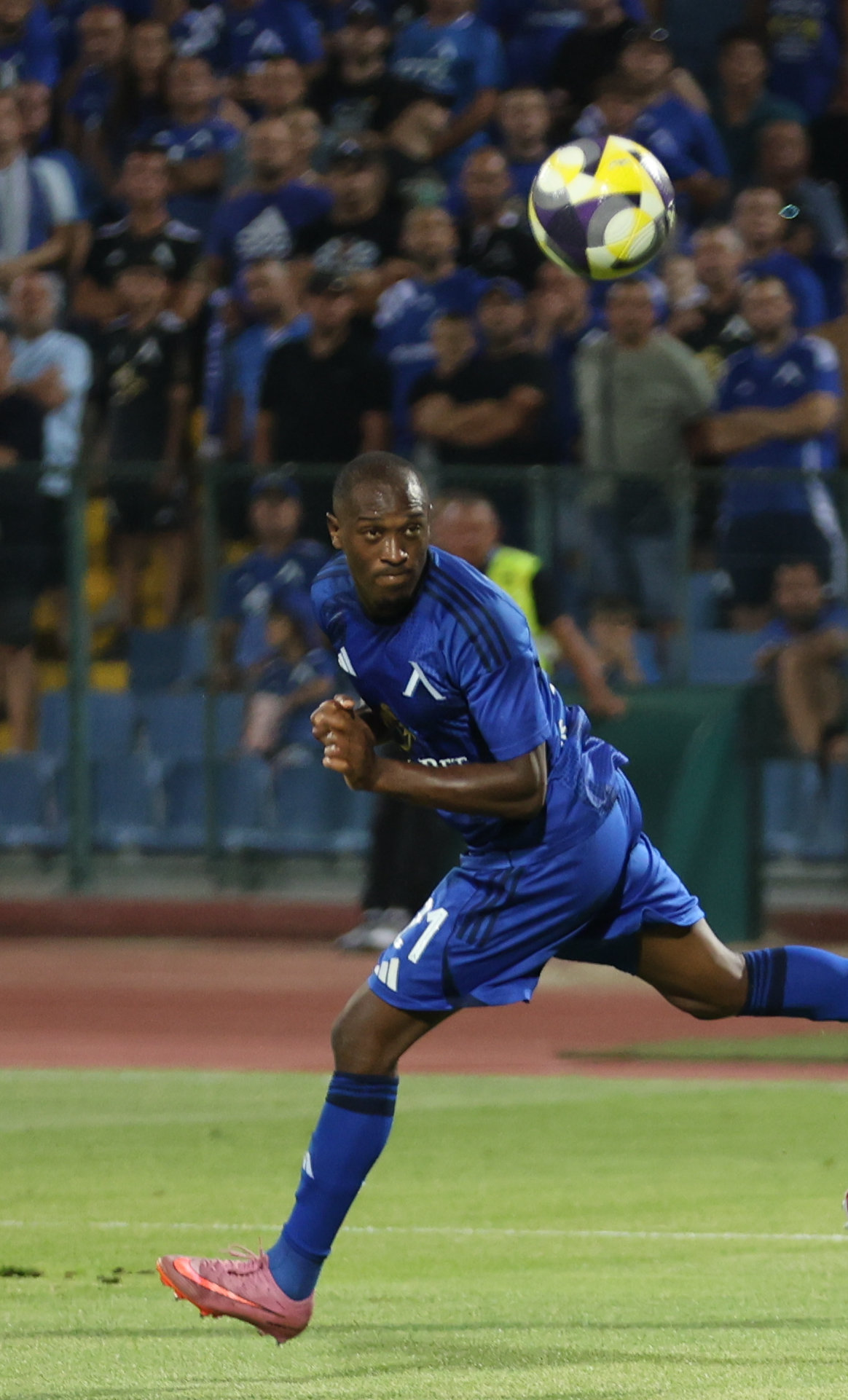
- Aldair with Levski Sofia in 2025

Personal information
- Full name: Aldair Neves Paulo Faustino
- Date of birth: 11 October 1999 (age 27)
- Place of birth: Torres Vedras, Portugal
- Height: 1.80 m (5 ft 11 in)
- Position: Right back

Team information
- Current team: Levski Sofia
- Number: 21

Youth career
- Torreense

Senior career*
Years	Team	Apps	(Gls)
2016–2017	Fonte Grada	3	(0)
2018–2019	Torreense	10	(0)
2019–2020	Académica	0	(0)
2020–2022	Sanjoanense	38	(1)
2022–2024	Ponferradina	8	(0)
2023	→ Sanjoanense (loan)	12	(0)
2023–2024	→ Paços de Ferreira (loan)	25	(2)
2024–	Levski Sofia	71	(4)
- * Club domestic league appearances and goals as of 22 November 2026

Aldair Neves Paulo Faustino (born 11 October 1999), simply known as Aldair, is a Portuguese professional footballer who plays as a right-back for Bulgarian First League club Levski Sofia.

== Club career ==
Aldair was born in Torres Vedras, and played for the youth sides of S.C.U. Torreense before making his senior debut with AMCR Fonte Grada in the Lisbon FA third division during the 2016–17 season. In 2017, he returned to Torreense's youth setup.

In 2019, Aldair moved to Académica de Coimbra and was initially assigned to the under-23 squad. On 15 October of the following year, he signed for A.D. Sanjoanense.

On 13 July 2022, Aldair moved abroad for the first time in his career, signing a three-year contract with Spanish Segunda División side SD Ponferradina. He made his professional debut on 15 August, coming on as a second-half substitute for Dani Ojeda in a 3–2 away win over FC Cartagena.

On 31 January 2023, Aldair returned to Sanjoanense on loan for the remainder of the 2022–23 Liga 3.

On 27 June 2023, Ponferradina sent Aldair on a season-long loan with an option-to-buy to recently-relegated to Liga Portugal 2 club Paços de Ferreira. In June 2024, he signed a two-and-a-half year contract with Bulgarian team Levski Sofia. In March 2025, Aldair scored last-minute goals in two consecutive league matches to help his team secure draws against rivals CSKA Sofia and Slavia Sofia.

== Honours ==
Levski Sofia

- Bulgarian First League: 2025–26
