= Joël Zwarts =

Dutch footballer (born 1999)

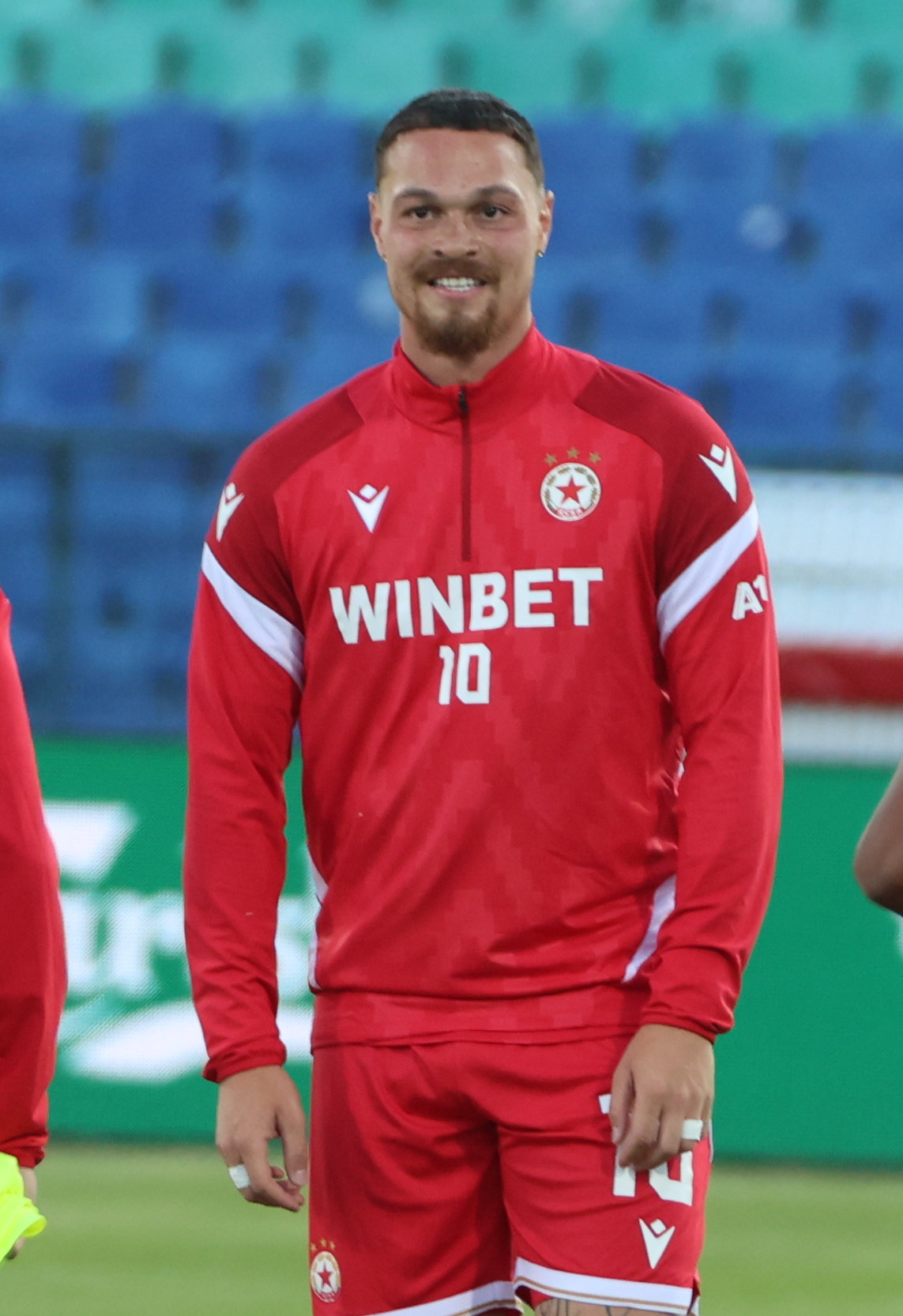

Personal information
- Date of birth: 16 April 1999 (age 27)
- Place of birth: Capelle aan den IJssel, Netherlands
- Height: 1.90 m (6 ft 3 in)
- Position: Forward

Team information
- Current team: CSKA Sofia
- Number: 10

Youth career
- VV Hillegersberg
- VV Nieuwerkerk
- Sparta Rotterdam
- –2017: Excelsior
- 2017–2018: Feyenoord

Senior career*
Years	Team	Apps	(Gls)
2018–2019	Jong Feyenoord	17	(8)
2019	→ FC Dordrecht (loan)	14	(6)
2019–2021	Excelsior	60	(19)
2021–2023	Jahn Regensburg	24	(2)
2022–2023	→ ADO Den Haag (loan)	32	(6)
2023–2024	1860 Munich	21	(6)
2024–2025	VfL Osnabrück	28	(4)
2026	Lokomotiv Plovdiv	15	(8)
2026–	CSKA Sofia	12	(9)

International career
2017	Netherlands U19	2	(0)
- * Club domestic league appearances and goals as of 18:00, 22 November 2026 (UTC)

Joël Zwarts (born 26 April 1999) is a Dutch professional footballer who plays as a forward for Bulgarian First League club CSKA Sofia.

== Club career ==
Born in Capelle aan den IJssel, Zwarts played youth football for VV Hillegersberg, VV Nieuwerkerk, Sparta Rotterdam and SBV Excelsior before joining Feyenoord in the summer of 2017. On 31 January 2019, he joined FC Dordrecht on loan until the end of the season. He made his debut for the club a day later in a 3–3 Eerste Divisie draw with Jong Ajax. On 24 June 2019, he returned to Excelsior on a three-year contract.

On 15 July 2021, Zwarts signed for 2. Bundesliga side Jahn Regensburg. On 14 July 2022, he returned to the Netherlands and joined ADO Den Haag on loan.

On 8 August 2023, Zwarts moved to 1860 Munich in 3. Liga.

On 19 June 2024, Zwarts joined VfL Osnabrück, also in 3. Liga. His contract was terminated after a single season at the club.

After six months without club, Zwarts signed a contract with Bulgarian First League club Lokomotiv Plovdiv on 9 February 2026. Three days later, he made his club debut as a substitute for Efe Ali, in the Bulgarian Cup tie against Botev Plovdiv, helping Lokomotiv to a 1–0 victory. He finished the season as Lokomotiv's top league goalscorer, with eight goals from fifteen appearances.

On 18 June 2026, Zwarts signed for fellow Bulgarian First League club CSKA Sofia after they reportedly met the €500 000 release clause in his Lokomotiv contract. He made his debut on 9 July, in a 3–2 win over Derry City in the first qualifying round of 2026–27 UEFA Europa League. On 27 July, Zwarts scored his first goals for CSKA, netting brace for a 3–2 league win over Botev Plovdiv.

== International career ==
Zwarts has played for the Netherlands at under-19 level.

== Career statistics ==
As of match played 22 November 2026

Club	Season	Division	League		National cup (Note: Includes KNVB Cup, DFB-Pokal, Bulgarian Cup)		Europe		Other		Total	
Club	Season	Division	Apps	Goals	Apps	Goals	Apps	Goals	Apps	Goals	Apps	Goals
Feyenoord	2018–19	Eredivisie	0	0	0	0	–		–		0	0
FC Dordrecht (loan)	2018–19	Eerste Divisie	14	6	–		–		–		14	6
Excelsior	2019–20	Eerste Divisie	28	9	2	0	–		–		30	9
Excelsior	2020–21	Eerste Divisie	32	10	4	1	–		–		36	11
Excelsior	Total		60	19	6	1	–		–		66	20
Jahn Regensburg	2021–22	2. Bundesliga	24	2	2	1	–		–		26	3
Jahn Regensburg	2023–24	3. Liga	0	0	1	1	–		–		1	1
Jahn Regensburg	Total		24	2	3	1	–		–		27	3
ADO Den Haag (loan)	2022–23	Eerste Divisie	32	6	3	2	–		–		35	8
1860 Munich	2023–24	3. Liga	21	6	2	1	–		–		23	7
VfL Osnabrück	2024–25	3. Liga	28	4	3	0	–		–		31	4
Lokomotiv Plovdiv	2025–26	Bulgarian First League	15	8	4	0	–		1 (Note: Appearance in Bulgarian First League UEFA Conference League play-off)	0	20	8
CSKA Sofia	2026–27	Bulgarian First League	12	9	1	0	10 (Note: Appearances in UEFA Europa League)	2	1	2	24	13
Career total			206	50	22	6	10	2	2	2	240	70

== Honours ==
CSKA Sofia

- Bulgarian Supercup: 2026
