= Armstrong Oko-Flex =

Irish association football player (born 2002)

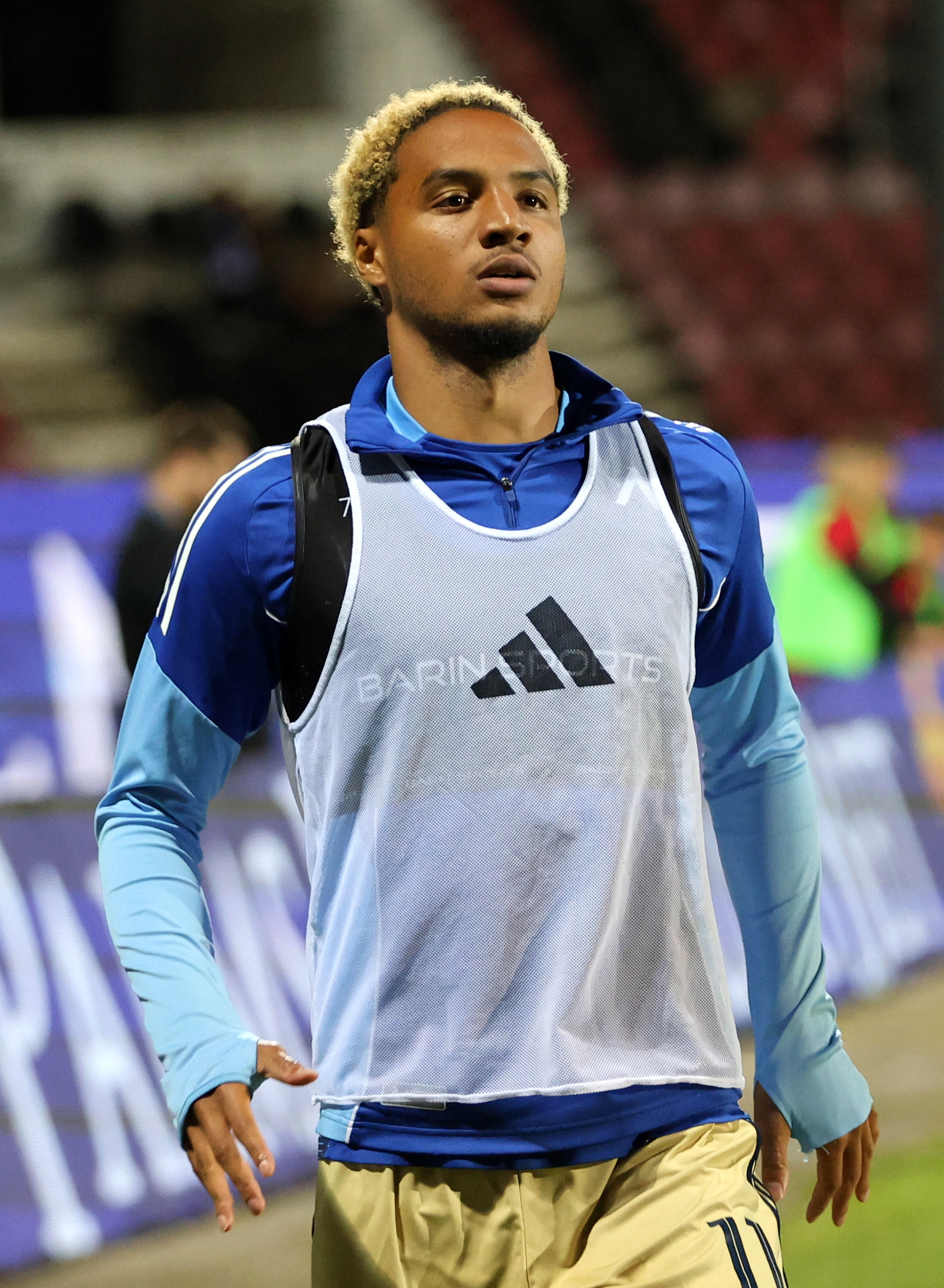
- Oko-Flex with Levski Sofia in 2026.

Personal information
- Full name: Armstrong Inya Echezolachuku Oko-Flex
- Date of birth: 2 March 2002 (age 24)
- Place of birth: Dublin, Ireland
- Height: 1.80 m (5 ft 11 in)
- Position: Winger

Team information
- Current team: Levski Sofia
- Number: 11

Youth career
- 2007–2009: Tolka Rovers
- 2009–2013: St Kevin's Boys
- 2013–2018: Arsenal
- 2018–2021: Celtic

Senior career*
Years	Team	Apps	(Gls)
2021	Celtic	2	(0)
2021–2023	West Ham United	0	(0)
2022–2023	→ Swansea City (loan)	13	(0)
2023–2025	Zürich	29	(2)
2025–2026	Botev Plovdiv	14	(6)
2026–	Levski Sofia	30	(6)

International career^{‡}
2017	Republic of Ireland U15	3	(0)
2017	England U15	1	(0)
2017	Republic of Ireland U16	5	(2)
2017–2018	England U16	7	(3)
2018	England U17	4	(0)
2019	Republic of Ireland U19	5	(0)
2023–2024	Republic of Ireland U21	6	(4)
- * Club domestic league appearances and goals as of 15:24, 22 November 2026 (UTC) ‡ National team caps and goals as of 11:15, 15 January 2026 (UTC)

Armstrong Inya Echezolachuku Oko-Flex (born 2 March 2002) is an Irish professional footballer who plays as a winger for Bulgarian First League club Levski Sofia.

== Club career ==
=== Youth career ===
Oko-Flex was born in Dublin and started out playing with a local academy, Tolka Rovers, then St Kevin's Boys before being spotted by Arsenal scout Liam Brady, who had also come through St Kevin's Boys, with Oko-Flex then signing for the London club in 2013. He played in the same youth team as future first-team player Bukayo Saka and in 2018 the pair were among 10 of their squad that signed a first-year scholarship with the club.

=== Celtic ===
He joined Celtic on a three-year deal from Arsenal in September 2018. He made his first team debut for the club as a substitute against Hibernian in January 2021. He made just two senior appearances during his time with the club, later stating that he and other young players found it first team opportunities difficult to come by having come through the academy.

=== West Ham United ===
On 25 June 2021, Oko-Flex joined West Ham United on a two-year contract with an option for a third year. On 16 August 2021, Oko-Flex scored a hat-trick in his Premier League 2 debut against his boyhood club Arsenal in a 6–1 home win. On 15 December 2021, Oko-Flex was an unused substitute for West Ham's Premier League fixture at the Emirates Stadium, a match won 2–0 by Arsenal. This was the first time he had made a first-team squad for the club. Oko-Flex made his debut for West Ham United on 25 August 2022 coming on as an 82nd-minute substitute for Manuel Lanzini in a 3–0 away win against Viborg in the second leg of a play-off round game in the 2022–23 UEFA Europa Conference League. He departed the club at the end of the 2022–23 season having made one first team appearance and featured on 35 occasions for the U21 side scoring 14 goals.

==== Swansea City (loan) ====
On 30 August 2022, Oko-Flex joined Swansea City on loan for the remainder of the 2022–23 season. He made 13 EFL Championship appearances before being recalled from his loan in January 2023.

=== FC Zürich ===
On 14 August 2023, he signed a two-year contract with Swiss Super League club FC Zürich. On 17 September 2023, he scored on his debut for the club, in a 3–0 win away to FC Tuggen in the Swiss Cup.

=== Botev Plovdiv ===
On 25 August 2025, Oko-Flex joined Bulgarian First League club Botev Plovdiv. He impressed with Botev Plovdiv, scoring 7 goals in 15 appearances in all competitions, earning a move away from the club in January 2026.

=== Levski Sofia ===
On 14 January 2026, Oko-Flex joined fellow Bulgarian First League club Levski Sofia on a three-year contract, after the club triggered his €300,000-worth release clause. By May 2026 he had helped the club to win the 2025–26 Bulgarian First League, their first league title in 17 years.

== International career ==
Oko-Flex was called up to the Republic of Ireland U21 squad for the first time in November 2021, for their 2023 UEFA European Under-21 Championship qualifiers against Italy & Sweden. Oko-Flex made his Republic of Ireland U21 debut on 16 June 2023, in a 2–2 draw with Ukraine U21 in a friendly played in Bad Blumau, Austria. On 13 October 2023, he scored both of his side's goals in a 2–1 win away to Latvia U21.

== Personal life ==
Oko-Flex is the son of the Nigerian-Irish community organiser Reginald Oko-Flex Inya.

== Career statistics ==
As of match played 8 November 2026

Appearances and goals by club, season and competition
Club	Season	League			National cup (Note: Includes Scottish Cup, FA Cup, Swiss Cup, Bulgarian Cup)		League cup (Note: Includes Scottish League Cup, EFL Cup & Bulgarian Elite Cup)		Europe		Other		Total	
Club	Season	Division	Apps	Goals	Apps	Goals	Apps	Goals	Apps	Goals	Apps	Goals	Apps	Goals
Celtic U21	2019–20	—			—		—		—		2 (Note: Appearances in Scottish Challenge Cup)	1	2	1
Celtic	2020–21	Scottish Premiership	2	0	0	0	0	0	0	0	—		2	0
West Ham United U21	2021–22	—			—		—		—		2 (Note: Appearances in EFL Trophy)	1	2	1
West Ham United	2022–23	Premier League	0	0	0	0	0	0	1 (Note: Appearance(s) in UEFA Conference League)	0	—		1	0
Swansea City (loan)	2022–23	Championship	13	0	—		—		—		—		13	0
FC Zürich	2023–24	Swiss Super League	17	2	3	1	—		—		—		20	3
FC Zürich	2024–25	Swiss Super League	12	0	1	0	—		4	0	—		17	0
FC Zürich	2025–26	Swiss Super League	0	0	0	0	—		—		—		0	0
FC Zürich	Total		29	2	4	1	—		4	0	—		37	3
Botev Plovdiv	2025–26	Bulgarian First League	14	6	1	1	—		—		—		15	7
Levski Sofia	2025–26	Bulgarian First League	17	2	1	0	—		—		1 (Note: Appearance in Bulgarian Supercup)	0	19	2
Levski Sofia	2026–27	Bulgarian First League	12	4	1	0	0	0	12 (Note: 8 appearances, 2 goals in UEFA Champions League; 4 appearances in UEFA Europa League)	2	1	0	26	6
Levski Sofia	Total		29	6	2	0	0	0	12	2	2	0	45	8
Career total			87	14	7	2	0	0	17	2	6	2	117	20

== Honours ==
Levski Sofia

- Bulgarian First League: 2025–26
