= Vasco Oliveira (footballer, born 2000) =

Portuguese footballer

Personal information
- Full name: Vasco da Cunha Roberto Oliveira
- Date of birth: 28 May 2000 (age 26)
- Place of birth: Ferreira do Zêzere, Portugal
- Height: 1.87 m (6 ft 1 1/2 in)
- Position: Centre-back

Team information
- Current team: Spartak Varna
- Number: 72

Youth career
- 2008–2013: U.F.C.I. Tomar
- 2013–2014: CADE
- 2014–2016: Benfica
- 2016–2017: Cagliari
- 2018–2019: Genoa
- 2020–2022: Estoril Praia

Senior career*
Years	Team	Apps	(Gls)
2016–2018	Cagliari	0	(0)
2017–2018	→ Olbia (loan)	1	(0)
2018–2019	Genoa	0	(0)
2022–2023	Farense	7	(0)
2022–2023	→ União de Leiria (loan)	21	(2)
2023–2026	União de Leiria	25	(2)
2024–2025	→ Torreense (loan)	8	(0)
2026	Dobrudzha	16	(2)
2026–	Spartak Varna	0	(0)
- * Club domestic league appearances and goals as of 1 June 2026

Vasco da Cunha Roberto Oliveira (born 28 May 2000), commonly known as Vasco Oliveira, is a Portuguese professional footballer who plays as a centre-back for Bulgarian First League club Spartak Varna.

== Club career ==
On 26 January 2022, Oliveira signed with Farense.

== Career statistics ==
=== Club ===
As of 6 November 2017

Appearances and goals by club, season and competition
Club	Season	League			Cup		Other		Total	
Club	Season	Division	Apps	Goals	Apps	Goals	Apps	Goals	Apps	Goals
Cagliari	2016–17	Serie A	0	0	1 (Note: Appearances in the Coppa Italia)	0	0	0	1	0
Olbia (loan)	2017–18	Serie C	1	0	1 (Note: Appearances in the Coppa Italia Serie C)	0	0	0	2	0
Career total			1	0	2	0	0	0	3	0
