= Serginho (footballer, born 1999) =

Portuguese footballer (born 1999)

Personal information
- Full name: Sérgio Miguel Lobo Araújo
- Date of birth: 1 December 1999 (age 26)
- Place of birth: Guimarães, Portugal
- Height: 1.81 m (5 ft 11 in)
- Position: Midfielder

Team information
- Current team: Levski Sofia
- Number: 35

Youth career
- 2007–2008: CD Ponte
- 2008–2012: Vitória S.C.
- 2012–2013: Os Sandinenses
- 2013–2016: Vitória S.C.
- 2016–2018: Moreirense

Senior career*
Years	Team	Apps	(Gls)
2018–2019	CD Ponte	21	(8)
2019–2020	Joane	20	(6)
2020–2022	Felgueiras 1932	46	(3)
2022–2023	Oliveirense	33	(4)
2023–2026	Santa Clara	77	(8)
2026–	Levski Sofia	12	(2)
- * Club domestic league appearances and goals as of 31 October 2026

Sérgio Miguel Lobo Araújo (born 1 December 1999), better known as Serginho, is a Portuguese professional footballer who plays as a midfielder for Bulgarian First League club Levski Sofia.

== Career ==
Serginho is a product of the youth academies of CD Ponte, Vitória S.C., Os Sandinenses, and Moreirense. He began his senior career with CD Ponte and Joane in the Portuguese fifth division. In 2020, he moved to Felgueiras 1932 in the Campeonato de Portugal where he stayed 2 seasons, helping them achieve promotion to the Liga 3 in the process. On 14 July 2022, he moved to Oliveirense in the Liga Portugal 2.

On 4 July 2023, he transferred to Santa Clara also in the Portuguese second division. He helped them win the 2023–24 Liga Portugal 2 and earned promotion to the Primeira Liga.

On 30 June 2026, Serginho joined Bulgarian First League club Levski Sofia on a three-year deal.

== Career statistics ==
As of match played 26 April 2026

Appearances and goals by club, season and competition
Club	Season	League			Cup		League Cup		Europe		Total	
Club	Season	Division	Apps	Goals	Apps	Goals	Apps	Goals	Apps	Goals	Apps	Goals
CD Ponte	2018–19	Liga Portugal 2	21	8	0	0	4	0	—		25	8
Joane	2019–20	Pro-nacional	20	6	0	0	2	2	—		22	8
Felgueiras 1932	2020–21	Campeonato de Portugal	21	0	2	0	—		—		23	0
Felgueiras 1932	2020–21	Campeonato de Portugal	25	3	1	0	—		—		26	3
Felgueiras 1932	Total		46	3	3	0	—		—		49	3
Oliveirense	2022–23	Liga Portugal 2	32	4	2	0	4	1	—		38	5
Santa Clara	2023–24	Liga Portugal 2	18	2	4	1	1	0	—		23	3
Santa Clara	2024–25	Primeira Liga	29	2	3	0	1	0	—		33	2
Santa Clara	2025–26	Primeira Liga	28	4	3	0	1	0	6 (Note: Appearances in UEFA Conference League)	0	38	4
Santa Clara	Total		75	8	10	1	2	0	6	0	94	9
Career total			194	29	15	1	13	3	6	0	226	33

== Honours ==
Santa Clara

- Liga Portugal 2: 2023–24
