= Reinaldo (footballer, born 2001) =

Brazilian footballer

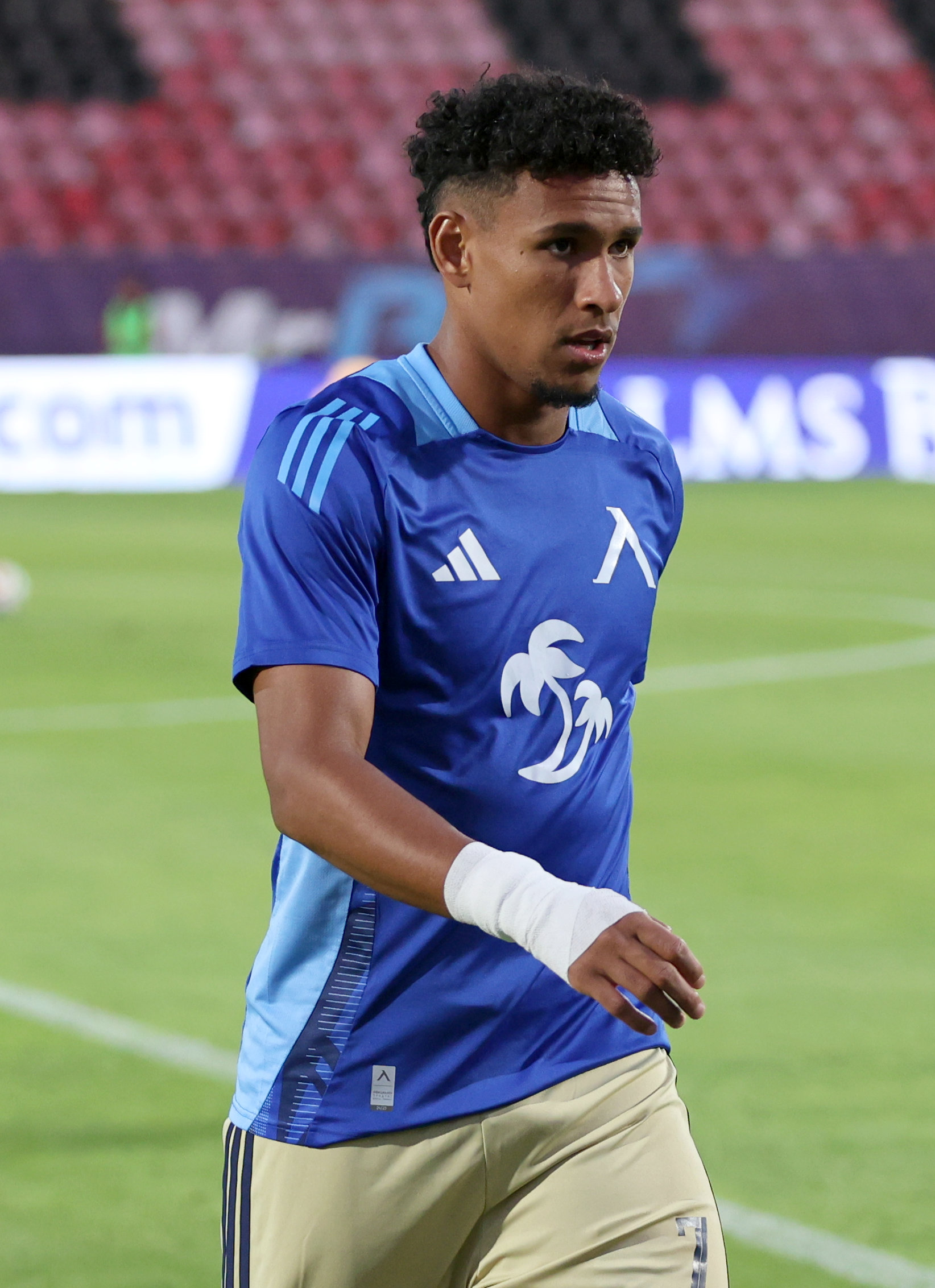

Personal information
- Full name: Reinaldo Nascimento Satorno
- Date of birth: 6 June 2001 (age 25)
- Place of birth: Criciúma, Brazil
- Height: 1.77 m (5 ft 10 in)
- Position: Winger

Team information
- Current team: Levski Sofia
- Number: 7

Youth career
- Criciúma

Senior career*
| Years | Team | Apps | (Gls) |
| 2019–2020 | Criciúma | 33 | (0) |
| 2020 | → Athletico Paranaense (loan) | 17 | (0) |
| 2020–2023 | Athletico Paranaense | 19 | (2) |
| 2021 | → CSA (loan) | 24 | (1) |
| 2023–2026 | Santa Clara | 0 | (0) |
| 2024 | → Guarani (loan) | 35 | (2) |
| 2025 | → Alverca (loan) | 13 | (2) |
| 2025–2026 | → Chaves (loan) | 30 | (6) |
| 2026– | Levski Sofia | 13 | (4) |
- * Club domestic league appearances and goals as of 22 November 2026

Reinaldo Nascimento Satorno (born 6 June 2001), simply known as Reinaldo, is a Brazilian professional footballer who plays as a winger for Bulgarian First League club Levski Sofia.

== Career ==
On 23 December 2023, Série B club Guarani announced that on 1 January 2024, Reinaldo would join them on a one-year loan from Liga Portugal 2 side Santa Clara.

On 30 June 2025, Reinaldo moved on loan to Chaves.

On 4 June 2026, Reinaldo joined Bulgarian First League champions Levski Sofia on a three-year deal.

== Career statistics ==
=== Club ===
As of match played 29 October 2024

Appearances and goals by club, season and competition
| Club | Season | League | | | State league | | Cup | | Continental | | Other | | Total | |
| Club | Season | Division | Apps | Goals | Apps | Goals | Apps | Goals | Apps | Goals | Apps | Goals | Apps | Goals |
|---|---|---|---|---|---|---|---|---|---|---|---|---|---|---|
| Criciúma | 2019 | Série B | 22 | 0 | 11 (Note: Appearance(s) in Campeonato Catarinense) | 0 | 1 | 0 | — | | — | | 34 | 0 |
| Athletico Paranaense (loan) | 2020 | Série A | 11 | 0 | 6 (Note: Appearance(s) in Campeonato Paranaense) | 0 | 2 | 0 | 1 (Note: Appearance(s) in Copa Libertadores) | 0 | — | | 20 | 0 |
| Athletico Paranaense | 2021 | Série A | 0 | 0 | 11 | 1 | 0 | 0 | 1 (Note: Appearance(s) in Copa Sudamericana) | 0 | — | | 12 | 1 |
| Athletico Paranaense | 2022 | Série A | — | | 7 | 1 | 0 | 0 | 0 | 0 | — | | 7 | 1 |
| Athletico Paranaense | 2023 | Série A | 1 | 0 | — | | 0 | 0 | 0 | 0 | — | | 1 | 0 |
| Athletico Paranaense | Total | | 1 | 0 | 18 | 2 | 0 | 0 | 1 | 0 | — | | 20 | 2 |
| CSA (loan) | 2021 | Série B | 24 | 1 | — | | — | | — | | 0 | 0 | 24 | 1 |
| Santa Clara | 2023-24 | Liga Portugal 2 | 0 | 0 | — | | 0 | 0 | — | | 1 (Note: Appearance(s) in Taça da Liga) | 0 | 1 | 0 |
| Santa Clara | 2024-25 | Primeira Liga | 0 | 0 | — | | 0 | 0 | — | | — | | 0 | 0 |
| Santa Clara | Total | | 0 | 0 | — | | 0 | 0 | — | | 1 | 0 | 1 | 0 |
| Guarani (loan) | 2024 | Série B | 23 | 0 | 12 (Note: Appearance(s) in Campeonato Paulista) | 2 | — | | — | | — | | 35 | 2 |
| Career total | | | 81 | 1 | 47 | 4 | 3 | 0 | 2 | 0 | 1 | 0 | 134 | 5 |

== Honours ==
Athletico Paranaense

- Campeonato Paranaense: 2020
