= Juan Perea =

Colombian footballer (born 1999)

Personal information
- Full name: Juan Esteban Perea Sánchez
- Date of birth: 21 August 1999 (age 27)
- Place of birth: Medellín, Colombia
- Height: 1.90 m (6 ft 3 in)
- Position: Forward

Team information
- Current team: Levski Sofia
- Number: 9

Senior career*
Years	Team	Apps	(Gls)
2021	Independiente Medellín	0	(0)
2021	Lusitânia	9	(4)
2022	Covilhã	10	(0)
2022–2024	Académica de Coimbra	48	(20)
2024–2026	Lokomotiv Plovdiv	41	(9)
2026–	Levski Sofia	25	(9)
- * Club domestic league appearances and goals as of 15:00, 22 November 2026 (UTC)

Juan Esteban Perea Sánchez (born 21 August 1999) is a Colombian professional footballer who plays as a forward for Bulgarian First League club Levski Sofia.

== Career ==
=== Early career ===
Perea began his career with his hometown club Independiente Medellín, before moving to Portugal, where he played for Lusitânia, Covilhã and Académica de Coimbra.

=== Bulgaria ===
On 2 September 2024, Perea joined Bulgarian First League side Lokomotiv Plovdiv for an undisclosed fee on a three-year contract.

On 29 January 2026, he moved to fellow Bulgarian First League club Levski Sofia on a contract until the end of 2028.

== Honours ==
Levski Sofia

- Bulgarian First League: 2025–26
