= Ivaylo Ivanov (footballer, born 2002) =

Bulgarian footballer (born 2002)

Personal information
- Full name: Ivaylo Ivaylov Ivanov
- Date of birth: 30 August 2002 (age 24)
- Place of birth: Gabrovo, Bulgaria
- Height: 1.76 m (5 ft 9 in)
- Position: Central midfielder

Team information
- Current team: Lokomotiv Plovdiv
- Number: 22

Youth career
- 2010–2014: Yantra
- 2014–2020: Levski Sofia

Senior career*
Years	Team	Apps	(Gls)
2020–2022	Yantra	72	(3)
2023	CSKA 1948 II	17	(0)
2023	CSKA 1948 III	8	(1)
2023–	Lokomotiv Plovdiv	90	(1)
- * Club domestic league appearances and goals as of 11 June 2026

Ivaylo Ivaylov Ivanov (Bulgarian: Ивайло Ивайлов Иванов; born 30 August 2002) is a Bulgarian professional footballer who plays as a midfielder for Lokomotiv Plovdiv.

== Career ==
=== Personal life and early career ===
Ivanov was born and raised in Gabrovo. He is the younger brother of fellow footballer Stanislav Ivanov. Ivaylo started out at his local club Yantra before moving to the academy setup at Levski Sofia at the age of 12. In June 2020, he returned to Yantra and made his professional debut for the club in a 1–0 Second League win over Kariana Erden on 8 August 2020, at the age of 17.
