= Svetoslav Vutsov =

Bulgarian footballer

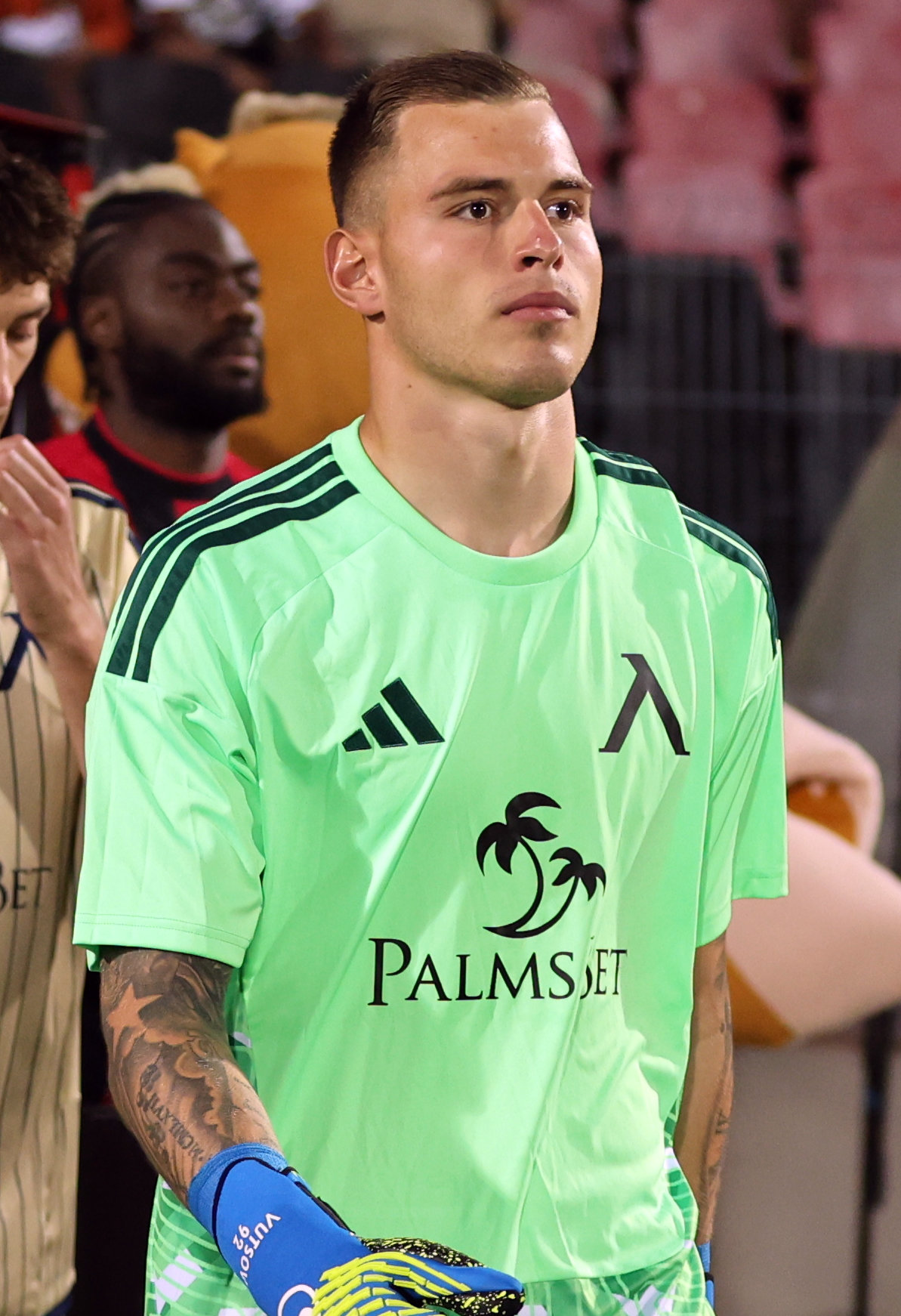

Personal information
- Full name: Svetoslav Velislavov Vutsov
- Date of birth: 9 July 2002 (age 24)
- Place of birth: Sofia, Bulgaria
- Height: 1.90 m (6 ft 3 in)
- Position: Goalkeeper

Team information
- Current team: Levski Sofia
- Number: 92

Youth career
- Slavia Sofia
- Botev Plovdiv
- –2017: Levski Sofia
- 2017–2018: Tsarsko Selo
- 2018–2019: Septemvri Sofia

Senior career*
Years	Team	Apps	(Gls)
2018–2019	Septemvri Sofia	0	(0)
2020–2025	Slavia Sofia	118	(0)
2025–	Levski Sofia	54	(0)

International career^{‡}
2018–2019	Bulgaria U17	2	(0)
2021	Bulgaria U19	1	(0)
2021	Bulgaria U21	6	(0)
2021–	Bulgaria	10	(0)
- * Club domestic league appearances and goals as of 17:13, 8 November 2026 (UTC) ‡ National team caps and goals as of 14 October 2025

Svetoslav Velislavov Vutsov (Bulgarian: Светослав Велиславов Вуцов; born 9 July 2002) is a Bulgarian professional footballer who plays as a goalkeeper for Levski Sofia.

He comes from a footballing family, with his grandfather Ivan, father Velislav, mother Svetlana and brother Petar having all played professional football.

== Club career ==
Vutsov began his career as a defender, but around 2015, while being in Levski Sofia's youth academy, he switched to a goalkeeper. In 2017, he moved to Tsarsko Selo and trained with the first team. Year later he moved to Septemvri Sofia, before joining Slavia Sofia in the beginning of 2020. He made his professional debut for the team in a league match against Etar in a league match on 21 November 2020, coming as a substitute in the 44th minute, after Georgi Petkov received an injury.

On 24 February 2025, in the last day of winter transfer window, Levski Sofia finally completed the transfer of Vutsov and he joined the club, after few months of speculations.

== International career ==
Vutsov received his first call up for Bulgaria U21 team in March 2021 for the friendly tournament matches against Ukraine on 24 March 2021, Kazakhstan on 26 March 2021, and North Macedonia on 29 March 2021.

He made his debut for Bulgaria national team on 11 November 2021 in a friendly against Ukraine. In October 2025, Vutsov announced that he is temporarily retiring from the national side, citing a number of issues pertaining to his treatment by coaching personnel within the national team set-up.

== Career statistics ==
=== Club ===
As of match played 7 December 2025

Appearances and goals by club, season and competition
Club	Season	League			Bulgarian Cup		Continental		Other		Total	
Club	Season	Division	Apps	Goals	Apps	Goals	Apps	Goals	Apps	Goals	Apps	Goals
Septemvri Sofia	2019–20	Second League	0	0	1	0	—		—		1	0
Slavia Sofia	2020–21	First League	22	0	5	0	—		—		27	0
Slavia Sofia	2021–22	First League	28	0	5	0	—		—		33	0
Slavia Sofia	2022–23	First League	28	0	2	0	—		—		30	0
Slavia Sofia	2023–24	First League	26	0	2	0	—		—		28	0
Slavia Sofia	2024–25	First League	14	0	1	0	—		—		15	0
Slavia Sofia	Total		118	0	15	0	0	0	0	0	133	0
Levski Sofia	2024–25	First League	11	0	0	0	—		—		11	0
Levski Sofia	2025–26	First League	19	0	0	0	8 (Note: Four appearances in UEFA Europa League, four appearances in UEFA Conference League)	0	—		27	0
Levski Sofia	Total		30	0	0	0	8	0	0	0	38	0
Career total			148	0	16	0	8	0	0	0	172	0

=== International ===
As of match played 14 October 2025

Appearances and goals by national team and year
National team	Year	Apps	Goals
Bulgaria	2021	1	0
Bulgaria	2022	3	0
Bulgaria	2023	0	0
Bulgaria	2024	2	0
Bulgaria	2025	4	0
Total		10	0

== Honours ==
Levski Sofia

- Bulgarian First League: 2025–26

Individual

- Best goalkeeper in Bulgarian football: 2021
- Best progressing young player in Bulgarian football: 2021
