= PFC Levski Sofia II =

Levski Sofia II
- Full name: Професионален Футболен Клуб "Левски" София II; Professional Football Club Levski Sofia II
- Nickname: Сините (The Blues)
- Short name: Levski II, Levski B
- Founded: 4 June 2022; 3 years ago
- Ground: Field 2, Georgi Asparuhov Training Complex
- Capacity: 1,000
- Chairman: Nasko Sirakov
- Manager: Yordan Petkov
- League: Third League
- 2023/24: 6th
- Website: https://levski.bg/
Home colours	Away colours	Third colours

Levski Sofia II (Bulgarian: Левски София II) or Levski Sofia B is the reserve team of Levski Sofia. Founded in 2022, it currently plays in the Third League.

Not being able to be in the same division as the main team, Levski II is ineligible for promotion to the First League and also cannot compete in the Bulgarian Cup.

== History ==
=== 2022–present: Foundation ===
Since 2015, the Bulgarian Football Union allowed teams to have reserve sides in the lower regional divisions. With the idea to give youth players the chance to get senior experience in men's football, Levski Sofia announced it has founded a reserve team that will compete in the Third League during its inaugural 2022–23 season. On 4 June 2022, Elin Topuzakov was announced as the head coach of the team. On 12 April 2023, Topuzakov was announced as an interim manager of Levski and Viktor Dimitrov was promoted as manager of the double.

== Squad ==
As of 31 December 2025

Note: Flags indicate national team as defined under FIFA eligibility rules; some limited exceptions apply. Players may hold more than one non-FIFA nationality.

No.	Pos.	Nation	Player
2	DF	BUL	Mario Daskalov
3	MF	BUL	Kaloyan Sokolov
4	DF	BUL	Dimitar Andonov
5	DF	BUL	Atanas Kirov
6	DF	BUL	Denis Dinev
7	MF	BUL	Anton Ivanov
10	FW	BUL	Velin Vazov
12	GK	BUL	Yoan Zagorov (captain)
13	FW	BUL	Kristiyan Krasimirov
14	FW	BUL	Kaloyan Petkov
15	DF	BUL	Slavi Chakarov

No.	Pos.	Nation	Player
16	DF	BUL	Georgi Korichkov
18	DF	BUL	Dimitar Shterev
19	FW	BUL	Aleksandar Dimitrov
20	MF	BUL	Martin Todorovski
21	FW	BUL	Vasil Vasilev
23	GK	BUL	Evgeni Berov
34	DF	BUL	Aleksandar Bozhilov
—	DF	BUL	Nikola Tsarovski
—	FW	BUL	Ivaylo Markov
—	FW	BUL	Georgi Atanasov

For first team players, see Levski Sofia.

== Personnel ==
=== Managerial history ===
Dates	Name	Honours
2022–2023	(Bulgaria) Elin Topuzakov	
2023	(Bulgaria) Viktor Dimitrov (interim)	
2023–2024	(Bulgaria) Hristo Arangelov	
2024–	(Bulgaria) Yordan Petkov	

== Seasons ==
=== Past seasons ===
Results of league and cup competitions by season
Season	League											Top goalscorer	
Season	Division	Level	P	W	D	L	F	A	GD	Pts	Pos	Top goalscorer	
2022–23	Third League	3	22	12	4	6	45	27	+17	40	12th	(Bulgaria) Kaloyan Strinski	12
2023–24	Third League	3											

==== Key ====
- GS = Group stage
- QF = Quarter-finals
- SF = Semi-finals

Champions	Runners-up	Promoted	Relegated
