= 2022 Bulgarian Supercup =

Финал за Суперкупата на България 2022
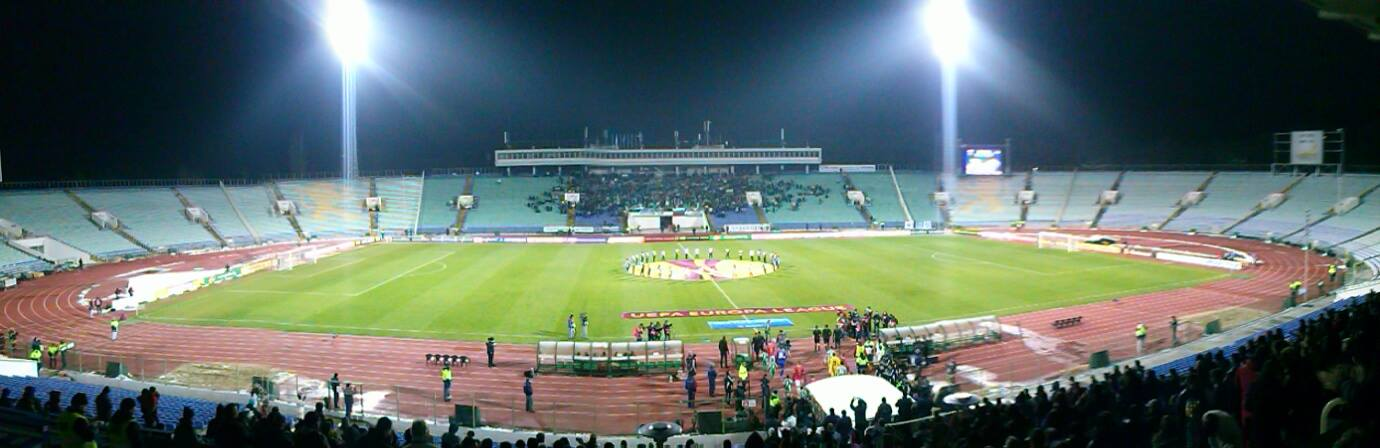
Ludogorets	Levski Sofia
First League	Bulgarian Cup
2	2
- Ludogorets won 4–3 on penalties
- Date: 1 September 2022
- Venue: Vasil Levski, Sofia
- Referee: Georgi Kabakov (Plovdiv)
- Attendance: 21,342
- Weather: Partly cloudy 22 °C (72 °F)

The 2022 Bulgarian Supercup was the 19th edition of the Bulgarian Supercup, an annual football match played between the winners of the previous season's First League and the Bulgarian Cup. The game was played between the champions of the 2021–22 First League, Ludogorets Razgrad, and the 2021–22 Bulgarian Cup winners, Levski Sofia.

This was Ludogorets's 10th Supercup appearance and Levski Sofia's 5th. It was also the two teams' first meeting in the Supercup.

Initially supposed to be played on 2 July 2022, the game was rescheduled for a date between 30 August and 1 September 2022. On 12 August 2022, it has been announced that the game has been scheduled for 1 September 2022.

The match finished 2–2, but Ludogorets won 4–3 on penalties for their 6th Supercup title.

== Match details ==
1 September 2022
20:00 UTC+3

Ludogorets Razgrad	2−2	Levski Sofia
Despodov 68', 72' (pen.)	Report	Milanov 41'; van der Kaap 90+2'
Penalties
Cauly (penalty scored); Rick (penalty missed); Cicinho (penalty scored); Thiago (penalty scored); Verdon (penalty scored)	4–3	(penalty scored) Popov; (penalty missed) Petkov; (penalty scored) Córdoba; (penalty scored) Bari; (penalty missed) Mitkov

Vasil Levski National Stadium, Sofia
Attendance: 21,342
Referee: Georgi Kabakov (Plovdiv)

Ludogorets	Levski

GK	1	(Netherlands) Sergio Padt
RB	4	(Bulgaria) Cicinho	(yellow card) 45+1'
CB	32	(Ukraine) Ihor Plastun	(yellow card) 71'
CB	24	(Benin) Olivier Verdon	(yellow card) 23'
LB	3	(Bulgaria) Anton Nedyalkov (c)
CM	23	(Angola) Show
CM	6	(Poland) Jakub Piotrowski	(yellow card) 38'
CM	95	(Brazil) Cauly
RW	37	(Ghana) Bernard Tekpetey	(yellow card) 26'	(substituted off) 46'
CF	10	(Argentina) Matías Tissera		(substituted off) 46'
LW	11	(Bulgaria) Kiril Despodov		(substituted off) 90'
Substitutes:
GK	12	(Croatia) Simon Sluga
DF	5	(Bulgaria) Georgi Terziev
DF	14	(Israel) Denny Gropper
MF	82	(Bulgaria) Ivan Yordanov
FW	9	(Brazil) Igor Thiago	(substituted on) 46'	(yellow card) 76'
FW	73	(Brazil) Rick	(substituted on) 46'	(yellow card) 79'
FW	90	(Bulgaria) Spas Delev	(substituted on) 90'
Manager:
(Slovenia) Ante Šimundža

GK	1	(Bulgaria) Plamen Andreev (c)	(yellow card) 70'
RB	2	(France) Jeremy Petris
CB	5	(Netherlands) Kellian van der Kaap	(yellow card) 77'
CB	33	(Panama) José Córdoba	(yellow card) 7'
LB	6	(Brazil) Wenderson Tsunami
CM	8	(Bulgaria) Andrian Kraev	(yellow card) 25'	(substituted off) 75'
CM	30	(Bulgaria) Filip Krastev
AM	7	(Bulgaria) Georgi Milanov		(substituted off) 84'
RW	18	(Brazil) Ronaldo
CF	14	(Bulgaria) Iliyan Stefanov	(yellow card) 47'	(substituted off) 67'
LW	17	(Brazil) Welton Felipe		(substituted off) 84'
Substitutes:
GK	13	(Bulgaria) Nikolay Mihaylov
DF	22	(Bulgaria) Patrik-Gabriel Galchev
MF	4	(Curaçao) Nathan Holder
MF	10	(Bulgaria) Ivelin Popov	(substituted on) 75'
MF	27	(Bulgaria) Asen Mitkov	(substituted on) 84'
MF	88	(Bulgaria) Marin Petkov	(substituted on) 84'
FW	19	(Morocco) Bilal Bari	(substituted on) 67'
Manager:
(Bulgaria) Stanimir Stoilov

Match officials

- Assistant referees:
  - Martin Margaritov (Plovdiv)
  - Diyan Valkov (Varna)
- Fourth official:
  - Vladimir Valkov (Plovdiv)
- Video assistant referee:
  - Krasen Georgiev (Varna)
- Assistant video assistant referee:
  - Dimo Valchev (Varna)

Match rules

- 90 minutes.
- No overtime.
- Penalty shoot-out if scores still level.
- Seven named substitutes.
- Maximum of five substitutions. (Note: Each team was given only three opportunities to make substitutions excluding substitutions made at half-time.)
