= 2022 Bulgarian Cup final =

Финал на Sesame Купа на България 2022
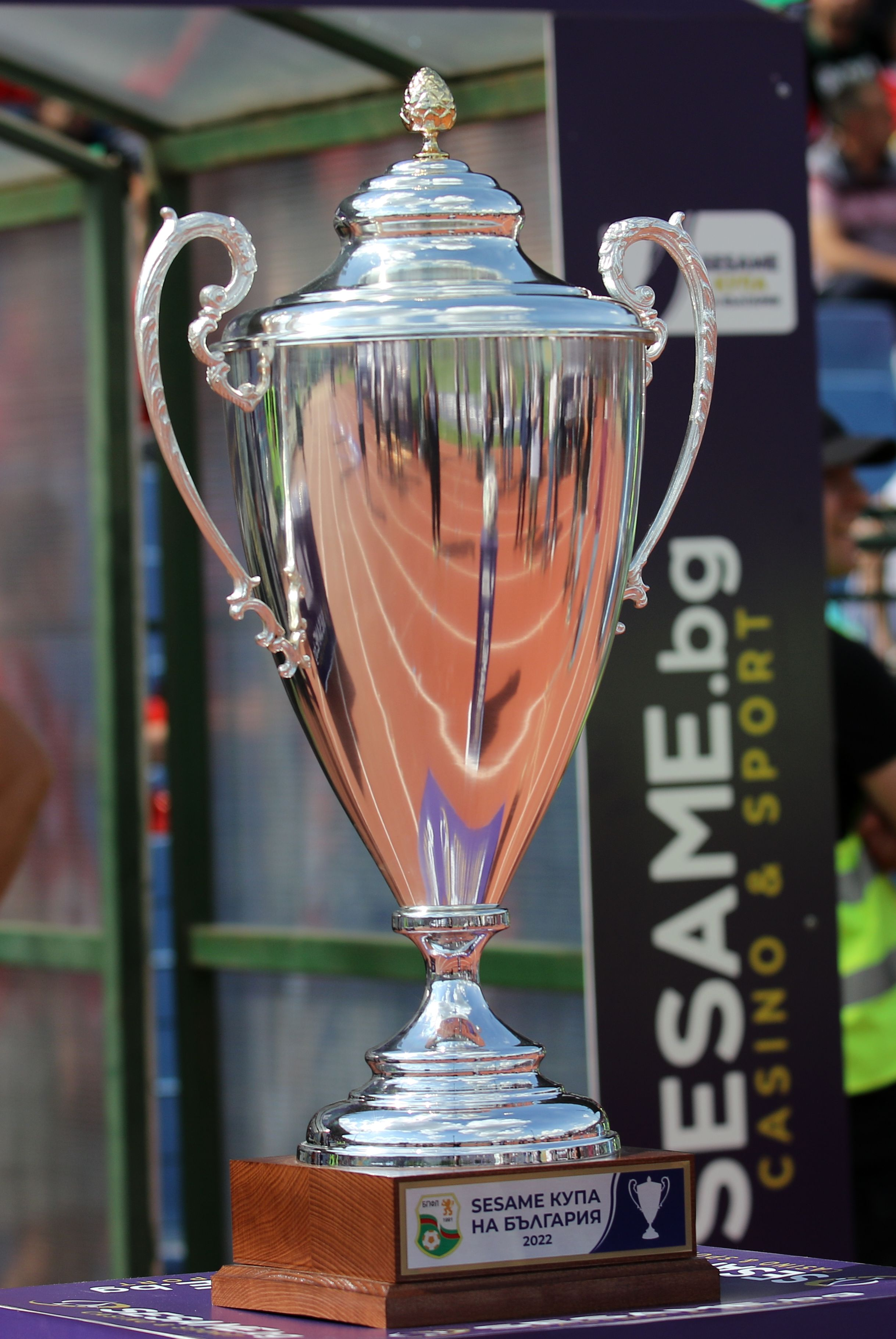
- Event: 2021–22 Bulgarian Cup
CSKA Sofia	Levski Sofia
0	1
- Date: 15 May 2022
- Venue: Vasil Levski, Sofia
- Man of the Match: Iliyan Stefanov (Levski)
- Referee: Nikola Popov (Sofia)
- Attendance: 40,600
- Weather: Clear; 25 °C (77 °F); 36% humidity

The 2022 Bulgarian Cup final was the final match of the 2021–22 Bulgarian Cup and the 82nd final of the Bulgarian Cup. The final originally should have been on 11 May 2022 at the Vasil Levski National Stadium in Sofia. On 28 April the date has been confirmed, but on the next day the Bulgarian Professional Football League and the Bulgarian Football Union announced a revised schedule, in which the game was set for 15 May 2022.

The clubs contesting the final were CSKA Sofia and Levski Sofia. This was the 17th occasion of the Eternal derby as a cup final and the first since 2005. For CSKA, this was the third consecutive final appearance and 35th overall, whereas for Levski, it was the first since 2018 and 38th overall. This was the 41st time both teams faced each other in the tournament's history.

Levski Sofia won the final with a narrow 1−0 victory, claiming a record 26th Bulgarian Cup title, their first since 2007, and ending a 13-year overall trophy drought, having last won the 2009 Bulgarian Supercup. Iliyan Stefanov scored the winning goal in the 57th minute. By winning the cup, Levski also secured a place in the second qualifying round of the 2022–23 UEFA Europa Conference League, giving them an opportunity to compete in European competition once again after a 3-year absence.

The final was the most attended match between two Bulgarian sides since the 1998 Bulgarian Cup final.

== Pre-match ==
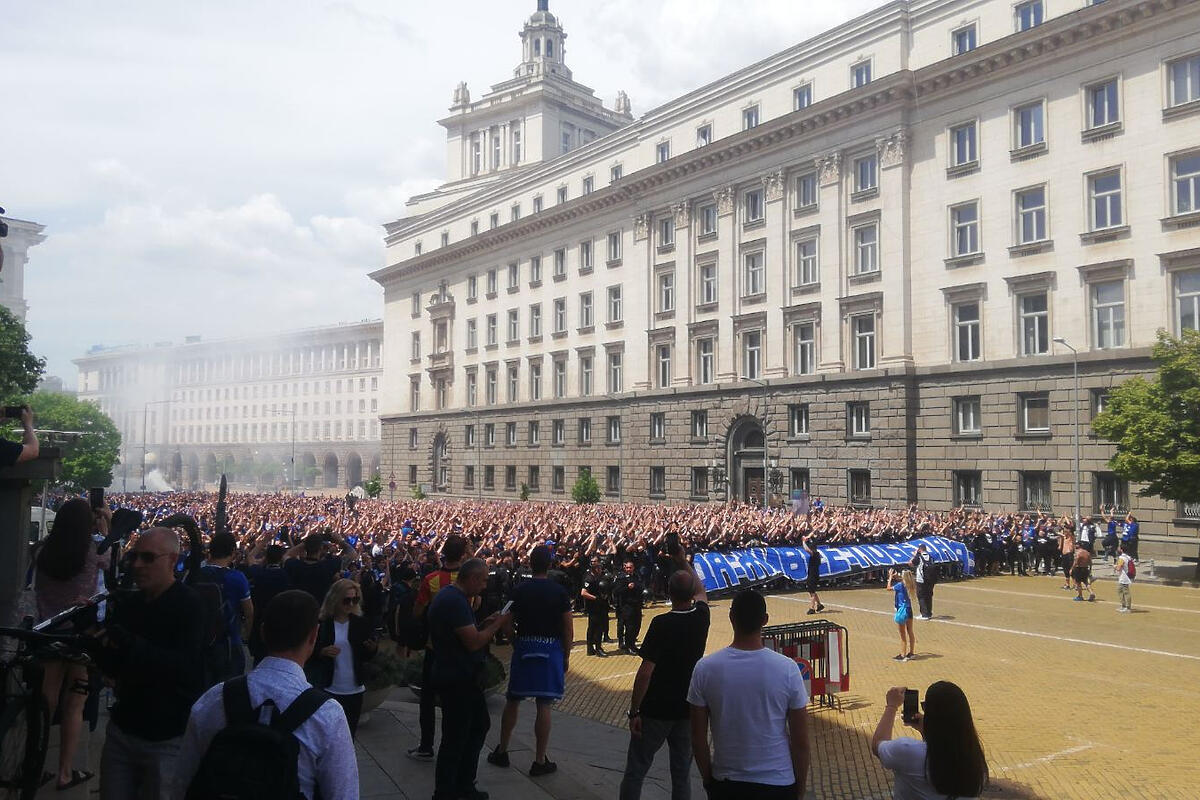
Levski fans making their way to the stadium before the final.

Originally, 18,564 tickets were provided for Levski fans and 15,597 for CSKA fans, totaling 34,161. Due to oversold tickets resulting from a vendor system error or unauthorized fan entry, the originally designated sections reached full capacity shortly before the kick-off with hundreds of fans still waiting to enter. All walkways were occupied by fans, as well as the emergency exits, and fans were even standing in unmarked areas such as the athletic track in front of the sections, under the electronic scoreboard, and the shelters designated for television cameras.

To accommodate the additional spectators, the police decided to open an extra section, part of the buffer zone between the two sets of fans. For security reasons, the police allowed only children accompanied by their parents to occupy these sections, as the close proximity to the opposing team's fans could have led to potential incidents if the sections were occupied by ultras. According to official police reports, the number of spectators at the stadium was 40,600.

== Route to the final ==
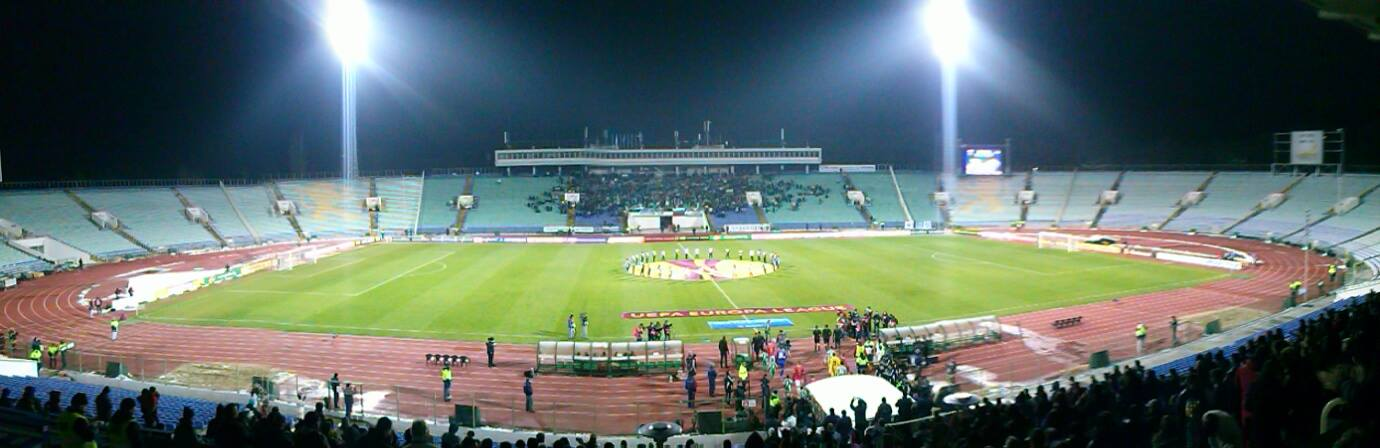
The Vasil Levski National Stadium in Sofia hosted the final.

CSKA Sofia			Round	Levski Sofia
Opponent	Result	Legs		Opponent	Result	Legs
Hebar	3–0	away	Round of 32	Marek	2–0	away
Arda	2–0	home	Round of 16	Septemvri Simitli	7–0	home
Lokomotiv Plovdiv	2–0	home	Quarter-finals	Septemvri Sofia	2–0	away
Slavia Sofia	2–2 (agg.) (7–6 p)	2–0 away; 0–2 (a.e.t.) home	Semi-finals	Ludogorets Razgrad	4–2 (agg.)	3–2 away; 1–0 home

== Match ==
=== Details ===
15 May 2022
17:00 UTC+3

CSKA Sofia	0–1	Levski Sofia
	Report	Stefanov 57'

Vasil Levski National Stadium, Sofia
Attendance: 40,600
Referee: Nikola Popov (Sofia)

CSKA	Levski

GK	1	(Brazil) Gustavo Busatto
RB	19	(Bulgaria) Ivan Turitsov	(yellow card) 90+2'
CB	29	(Finland) Thomas Lam	(yellow card) 19'
CB	4	(Netherlands) Menno Koch (c)
LB	18	(Republic of the Congo) Bradley Mazikou
DM	24	(Croatia) Karlo Muhar		(substituted off) 56'
DM	3	(Brazil) Geferson
RW	10	(Bulgaria) Georgi Yomov	(yellow card) 65'
AM	15	(France) Thibaut Vion		(substituted off) 75'
LW	8	(Republic of Ireland) Graham Carey		(substituted off) 63'
CF	9	(Ecuador) Jordy Caicedo
Substitutes:
GK	25	(Bulgaria) Dimitar Evtimov
DF	6	(Bulgaria) Hristiyan Petrov
MF	5	(Argentina) Federico Varela	(substituted on) 75'
MF	7	(France) Yohan Baï
MF	21	(Central African Republic) Amos Youga	(substituted on) 56'	(yellow card) 87'
MF	30	(Suriname) Yanic Wildschut
FW	27	(Brazil) Maurício Garcez	(substituted on) 63'
Manager:
(England) Alan Pardew

GK	1	(Bulgaria) Plamen Andreev (c)
CB	5	(Netherlands) Kellian van der Kaap
CB	23	(The Gambia) Noah Sonko Sundberg
CB	33	(Panama) José Córdoba
RM	91	(Switzerland) Dragan Mihajlović	(yellow card) 90+5'
CM	7	(Bulgaria) Georgi Milanov
CM	30	(Bulgaria) Filip Krastev	(yellow card) 87'
LM	6	(Brazil) Wenderson Tsunami	(yellow card) 23'
AM	14	(Bulgaria) Iliyan Stefanov		(substituted off) 82'
SS	17	(Brazil) Welton Felipe		(substituted off) 90+4'
CF	19	(Morocco) Bilal Bari
Substitutes:
GK	13	(Bulgaria) Nikolay Mihaylov
GK	99	(Bulgaria) Yoan Zagorov
DF	4	(Bulgaria) Ivan Goranov
DF	22	(Bulgaria) Patrik-Gabriel Galchev
MF	8	(Bulgaria) Andrian Kraev	(substituted on) 82'
MF	10	(Bulgaria) Radoslav Tsonev
FW	88	(Bulgaria) Marin Petkov	(substituted on) 90+4'
Manager:
(Bulgaria) Stanimir Stoilov

Man of the Match:
Iliyan Stefanov (Levski Sofia)
Assistant referees:
Georgi Todorov (Sofia)
Martin Venev (Sofia)
Fourth official:
Georgi Ginchev (Veliko Tarnovo)
Reserve assistant referee:
Georgi Minev (Sofia)
Video assistant referee:
Ivaylo Stoyanov (Petrich)
Assistant video assistant referee:
Ivo Kolev (Sofia)

Match rules

- 90 minutes.
- 30 minutes of extra time if necessary.
- Penalty shoot-out if scores still level.
- Seven named substitutes.
- Maximum of five substitutions, with a sixth allowed in extra time (Note: Each team will be given only three opportunities to make substitutions, with a fourth opportunity in extra time, excluding substitutions made at half-time, before the start of extra time and at half-time in extra time.)
