= 2022–23 PFC Levski Sofia season =

Levski Sofia
2022–23 season
- Chairman: Nasko Sirakov
- Manager: Stanimir Stoilov (until 9 April 2023); Elin Topuzakov (since 10 April 2023)
- Stadium: Vivacom Arena - Georgi Asparuhov
- First League: 4th
- Bulgarian Cup: Round of 16
- Bulgarian Supercup: Runners-up
- UEFA Europa Conference League: Third qualifying round
- Top goalscorer: League: Ricardinho (9); All: Ricardinho; Filip Krastev (9)
- Highest home attendance: 20,000 v. CSKA Sofia (18 September 2022)
- Lowest home attendance: 2,865 v. Septemvri Sofia (4 May 2023)
- Average home league attendance: 7,431
- Biggest win: 5–0 v. Spartak Varna (H)
- Biggest defeat: 0–2 v. CSKA Sofia (H)
| Home colours | Away colours | Third colours |

The 2022–23 season was Levski Sofia's 102nd season in the First League. This article shows player statistics and all matches (official and friendly) that the club has played during the season.

== Transfers ==
=== In ===
| No. | Pos. | Nat. | Name | Age | EU | Moving from | Type | Transfer window | Ends | Transfer fee | Source |
|---|---|---|---|---|---|---|---|---|---|---|---|
| 2 | DF | (France) | Jeremy Petris | 24 | EU | (Bulgaria) Tsarsko Selo | Free transfer | Summer | 2023 | Free | |
| 4 | MF | (Curaçao) | Nathan Holder | 20 | EU | (Netherlands) Groningen U21 | Free transfer | Summer | 2025 | Free | |
| 9 | FW | (Brazil) | Ricardinho | 21 | Non-EU | (Brazil) Grêmio | Free transfer | Winter | 2025 | Free | |
| 10 | MF | (Bulgaria) | Ivelin Popov | 34 | EU | (Russia) Sochi | Free transfer | Summer | 2024 | Free | |
| 11 | FW | (Spain) | Jawad El Jemili | 20 | EU | (Cyprus) Akritas Chlorakas | Transfer | Winter | 2026 | Undisclosed | |
| 12 | MF | (Nigeria) | Shehu Abdullahi | 29 | Non-EU | (Cyprus) Omonia | Free transfer | Summer | 2023 | Free | |
| 18 | FW | (Brazil) | Ronaldo | 21 | Non-EU | (Brazil) Bahia | Transfer | Summer | 2025 | Undisclosed | |
| 20 | MF | (Bulgaria) | Asen Chandarov | 23 | EU | (Bulgaria) Septemvri Sofia | Transfer | Winter | 2024 | Undisclosed | |
| 21 | DF | (Croatia) | Ante Blažević | 26 | EU | (Bosnia and Herzegovina) Željezničar | Free transfer | Summer | 2024 | Free | |
| 33 | DF | (Panama) | José Córdoba | 20 | Non-EU | (Bulgaria) Etar | Transfer | Summer | 2025 | Undisclosed | |
| 50 | DF | (Bulgaria) | Kristian Dimitrov | 25 | EU | (Croatia) Hajduk Split | Free transfer | Winter | 2024 | Free | |

=== Out ===
| No. | Pos. | Nat. | Name | Age | EU | Moving to | Type | Transfer window | Transfer fee | Source |
|---|---|---|---|---|---|---|---|---|---|---|
| 4 | DF | (Bulgaria) | Ivan Goranov | 30 | EU | (Belgium) Charleroi | Loan return | Summer | | |
| 7 | MF | (Bulgaria) | Georgi Milanov | 30 | EU | (United Arab Emirates) Al Dhafra | Transfer | Winter | 150 000 € | |
| 10 | MF | (Bulgaria) | Radoslav Tsonev | 27 | EU | (Bulgaria) Pirin Blagoevgrad | End of contract | Summer | Free | |
| 12 | MF | (Nigeria) | Shehu Abdullahi | 29 | Non-EU | | Released | Winter | Free | |
| 20 | MF | (Bulgaria) | Dimitar Kostadinov | 22 | EU | (Bulgaria) Septemvri Sofia | Released | Summer | Free | |
| 91 | DF | (Switzerland) | Dragan Mihajlović | 30 | EU | (Switzerland) Bellinzona | End of contract | Summer | Free | |

=== Loans out ===
| No. | Pos. | Nat. | Name | Age | EU | Moving to | Type | Transfer window | Transfer fee | Source |
|---|---|---|---|---|---|---|---|---|---|---|
| 4 | MF | (Curaçao) | Nathan Holder | 20 | EU | (Bulgaria) Spartak Varna | | Winter | | |
| 11 | MF | (Bulgaria) | Zdravko Dimitrov | 23 | EU | (Bulgaria) Spartak Varna | | Summer | | |
| 11 | MF | (Bulgaria) | Zdravko Dimitrov | 24 | EU | (Turkey) Sakaryaspor | | Winter | | |

== Squad ==
Updated on 6 March 2023.

| No. | Name | Nationality | Position(s) | Age | EU | Ends | Signed from | Transfer fee | Notes |
Goalkeepers
| 1 | Plamen Andreev | Bulgaria | GK | 21 | EU | 2024 | Youth system | W/S | |
| 13 | Nikolay Mihaylov | Bulgaria | GK | 38 | EU | 2024 | (Cyprus) Omonia | Free | Originally from Youth system |
| 99 | Ivan Andonov | Bulgaria | GK | 22 | EU | | Youth system | W/S | |
Defenders
| 2 | Jeremy Petris | France | RB/RW | 28 | EU | 2023 | (Bulgaria) Tsarsko Selo | Free | |
| 5 | Kellian van der Kaap | Netherlands | CB/DM | 28 | EU | 2024 | (Denmark) Viborg | Free | Second nationality: Cameroon |
| 6 | Wenderson Tsunami | Brazil | LB | 30 | Non-EU | 2024 | (Brazil) Botafogo-PB | Free | |
| 21 | Ante Blažević | Croatia | RB | 30 | EU | 2024 | (Bosnia and Herzegovina) Željezničar | Free | |
| 22 | Patrik-Gabriel Galchev | Bulgaria | RB/LB/RW | 25 | EU | 2024 | Youth system | W/S | Second nationality: Spain |
| 23 | Noah Sonko Sundberg | Gambia | CB/RB | 30 | EU | 2024 | (Sweden) Östersund | Free | Second nationality: Sweden |
| 33 | José Córdoba | Panama | CB/LB | 25 | Non-EU | 2025 | (Bulgaria) Etar | Undisclosed | |
| 50 | Kristian Dimitrov | Bulgaria | CB | 29 | EU | 2024 | (Croatia) Hajduk Split | Free | |
Midfielders
| 8 | Andrian Kraev | Bulgaria | DM | 27 | EU | 2024 | (Bulgaria) Hebar | Free | Originally from Youth system |
| 10 | Ivelin Popov | Bulgaria | AM/CF/RW | 39 | EU | 2024 | (Russia) Sochi | Free | Originally from Youth system |
| 14 | Iliyan Stefanov | Bulgaria | AM | 28 | EU | 2024 | (Bulgaria) Beroe | Free | Originally from Youth system |
| 20 | Asen Chandarov | Bulgaria | AM/CM | 27 | EU | 2024 | (Bulgaria) Septemvri Sofia | Undisclosed | Originally from Youth system |
| 27 | Asen Mitkov | Bulgaria | AM/CM | 21 | EU | 2024 | Youth system | W/S | |
| 30 | Filip Krastev | Bulgaria | AM/CM | 25 | EU | 2023 | (Belgium) Lommel | Loan | |
| 71 | Antoan Stoyanov | Bulgaria | DM/CM | 21 | EU | 2024 | Youth system | W/S | |
Forwards
| 9 | Ricardinho | Brazil | CF/LW/RW | 25 | Non-EU | 2025 | (Brazil) Grêmio | Free | Second nationality: Portugal |
| 11 | Jawad El Jemili | Spain | RW/LW/AM | 24 | EU | 2026 | (Cyprus) Akritas Chlorakas | Undisclosed | Second nationality: Morocco |
| 17 | Welton Felipe | Brazil | LW/CF | 29 | Non-EU | 2025 | (Brazil) Botafogo-PB | Undisclosed | |
| 18 | Ronaldo | Brazil | RW/CF | 25 | Non-EU | 2025 | (Brazil) Bahia | Undisclosed | |
| 19 | Bilal Bari | Morocco | CF | 28 | EU | 2024 | (Bulgaria) Montana | 50 000 € | Second nationality: France |
| 88 | Marin Petkov | Bulgaria | RW/CF/AM | 23 | EU | 2024 | Youth system | W/S | |

== Performance overview ==
| Competition | First match | Last match | Starting round | Final position | Record | | | | | | | |
| Competition | First match | Last match | Starting round | Final position | Pld | W | D | L | GF | GA | GD | Win % |
|---|---|---|---|---|---|---|---|---|---|---|---|---|
| First League | 9 July 2022 | 11 June 2023 | Matchday 1 | 4th | 36 | 18 | 10 | 8 | 49 | 22 | +27 | 50.00 |
| Bulgarian Cup | 19 November 2022 | 4 December 2022 | Round of 32 | Round of 16 | 2 | 1 | 0 | 1 | 5 | 3 | +2 | 50.00 |
| Bulgarian Supercup | 1 September 2022 | | Final | Runners-up | 1 | 0 | 1 | 0 | 2 | 2 | +0 | 0.00 |
| UEFA Europa Conference League | 21 July 2022 | 11 August 2022 | Second qualifying round | Third qualifying round | 4 | 2 | 1 | 1 | 5 | 3 | +2 | 50.00 |
| Total | | | | | 43 | 21 | 12 | 10 | 61 | 30 | +31 | 48.84 |

Last updated: 11 June 2023
Source: Fixtures

== Fixtures ==
Win Draw Loss Upcoming fixture

=== Friendlies ===
==== Summer ====
| 18 June 2022 | Levski Sofia | 1–1 | Septemvri Sofia | Sofia |
| 11:30 UTC+3 | Bari 37' | Report | Ilievski 26' | Stadium: Vivacom Arena - Georgi Asparuhov; Referee: Stanimir Trenchev (Sofia) |
Note: The match was played in two halves of 25 and 35 minutes on the away team's request.

| 22 June 2022 | Levski Sofia | 2–1 | Pirin Blagoevgrad | Samokov |
| 18:00 UTC+3 | Ronaldo 3', 6' | Report | Stanoev 39' | Stadium: Iskar; Referee: Mariyan Grebencharski (Samokov) |

| 25 June 2022 Georgi Sokolov Cup | Levski Sofia (Bulgaria) | 3–1 | (North Macedonia) Akademija Pandev | Sofia |
| 18:00 UTC+3 | Ronaldo 6'; Bari 34', 70' | Report | Pandev 82' | Stadium: Vivacom Arena - Georgi Asparuhov; Referee: Nikola Popov (Sofia) |

| 29 June 2022 | Levski Sofia | 2–1 | Lokomotiv Sofia | Sofia |
| 18:00 UTC+3 | Petkov 45+3'; Bari 84' | Report | Miloshev 9' | Stadium: Vivacom Arena - Georgi Asparuhov; Referee: Volen Chinkov (Sofia) |

| 5 July 2022 | Levski Sofia | 5–0 | Etar | Sofia |
| 19:00 UTC+3 | Welton 58'; Ronaldo 64', 71'; Bari 82', 90+3' | Report | | Stadium: Vivacom Arena - Georgi Asparuhov; Referee: Stoyan Arsov (Sofia) |

==== Mid-season ====
| 25 September 2022 | Levski Karlovo | 0–4 | Levski Sofia | Karlovo |
| 16:00 UTC+3 | | Report | Popov 4', 42'; Kraev 30'; Strinski 80' | Stadium: Vasil Levski; Referee: Radoslav Gidzhenov (Plovdiv) |

| 27 September 2022 | Levski Sofia | 1–1 | Sportist Svoge | Sofia |
| 16:00 UTC+3 | Welton 17' | Report | Semerdzhiev 26' | Stadium: Vivacom Arena - Georgi Asparuhov; Referee: Petar Grigorov (Sofia) |

| 31 March 2023 | Levski Sofia | 2–0 | Botev Vratsa | Sofia |
| 14:00 UTC+3 | Chandarov 79'; K. Dimitrov 81' | Report | | Stadium: Vivacom Arena - Georgi Asparuhov; Referee: Ivan Ivanov (Sofia) |

| 3 April 2023 | Levski Sofia | 1–2 | Maritsa Plovdiv | Sofia |
| 14:00 UTC+3 | Petkov 67' | Report | James 63'; Aliev 86' | Stadium: Vivacom Arena - Georgi Asparuhov; Referee: Martin Markov (Sofia) |

| 4 April 2023 | Levski Sofia | 4–0 | Vitosha Bistritsa | Sofia |
| 14:00 UTC+3 | Ricardinho 45+1' (pen.); Welton 66'; Paskalev 73' (o.g.); Popov 76' | Report | | Stadium: Vivacom Arena - Georgi Asparuhov; Referee: Mariyan Grebencharski (Samokov) |

==== Winter ====
| 12 January 2023 | Levski Sofia (Bulgaria) | 2–1 | (United Arab Emirates) Al-Nasr | Dubai, United Arab Emirates |
| 18:30 UTC+4 | Petkov 1', 22' | Report | Mendes 48' | Stadium: Al Maktoum Stadium |

| 17 January 2023 | Levski Sofia (Bulgaria) | 2–3 | Kuwait SC | Dubai, United Arab Emirates |
| 17:00 UTC+4 | Petkov 20'; Welton 25' | Report | van der Kaap 75' (o.g.); Hussain 82', 90' | Stadium: JA Sport & Shooting Center |

| 22 January 2023 | Levski Sofia (Bulgaria) | 3–2 | (Latvia) Riga | Dubai, United Arab Emirates |
| 14:00 UTC+4 | Chandarov 23' (pen.); Ricardinho 50', 76' | Report | Minchev 20' (pen.); Talla 70' | Stadium: JA Sport & Shooting Center |

| 25 January 2023 | Levski Sofia (Bulgaria) | 2–0 | (Latvia) Riga | Dubai, United Arab Emirates |
| 17:00 UTC+4 | Ricardinho 38', 59' | Report | | Stadium: JA Sport & Shooting Center |

| 28 January 2023 | Levski Sofia (Bulgaria) | 0–1 | (Malaysia) Johor Darul Ta'zim | Dubai, United Arab Emirates |
| 18:00 UTC+4 | | Report | Muñiz 25' | Stadium: JA Sport & Shooting Center |
Note: The match was abandoned in the 54th minute after a brawl between both sets of players.

| 31 January 2023 | Levski Sofia (Bulgaria) | 4–0 | (United Arab Emirates) Gulf United | Dubai, United Arab Emirates |
| 11:00 UTC+4 | van der Kaap 8', 54'; Welton 62'; Petkov 82' | Report | | Stadium: JA Sport & Shooting Center |

| 7 February 2023 | Levski Sofia | 4–1 | Septemvri Sofia | Sofia |
| 14:00 UTC+2 | Ricardinho 45+3' (pen.); Tsunami 50'; Welton 58'; Petkov 74' | Report | M. D. Petkov 37' | Stadium: Vivacom Arena - Georgi Asparuhov |

=== First League ===
==== Preliminary stage ====
===== League table =====
| Pos | Team | Pld | W | D | L | GF | GA | GD | Pts | Qualification |
|---|---|---|---|---|---|---|---|---|---|---|
| 2 | CSKA Sofia | 30 | 23 | 4 | 3 | 57 | 14 | +43 | 73 | Qualification for the Championship group |
| 3 | CSKA 1948 | 30 | 17 | 8 | 5 | 49 | 22 | +27 | 59 | Qualification for the Championship group |
| 4 | Levski Sofia | 30 | 15 | 9 | 6 | 38 | 14 | +24 | 54 | Qualification for the Championship group |
| 5 | Cherno More | 30 | 15 | 8 | 7 | 36 | 27 | +9 | 53 | Qualification for the Championship group |
| 6 | Lokomotiv Plovdiv | 30 | 14 | 8 | 8 | 33 | 28 | +5 | 50 | Qualification for the Championship group |

Source: soccerway, Bulgarian Football
Rules for classification: 1) Points; 2) Head-to-head points; 3) Head-to-head goal difference; 4) Head-to-head goals scored; 5) Head-to-head away goals scored (only if two teams); 6) Goal difference; 7) Goals scored; 8) Fairplay ranking; 9) Draw.

===== Results summary =====
| Overall | | | | | | | | Home | | | | | | Away | | | | | |
| Pld | W | D | L | GF | GA | GD | Pts | W | D | L | GF | GA | GD | W | D | L | GF | GA | GD |
|---|---|---|---|---|---|---|---|---|---|---|---|---|---|---|---|---|---|---|---|
| 30 | 15 | 9 | 6 | 38 | 14 | +24 | 54 | 10 | 3 | 2 | 23 | 4 | +19 | 5 | 6 | 4 | 15 | 10 | +5 |

Last updated: 8 May 2023.
Source: bulgarian-football.com

===== Results by round =====
| Round | 1 | 2 | 3 | 4 | 5 | 6 | 7 | 8 | 9 | 10 | 11 | 12 | 13 | 14 | 15 | 16 | 17 | 18 | 19 | 20 | 21 | 22 | 23 | 24 | 25 | 26 | 27 | 28 | 29 | 30 |
|---|---|---|---|---|---|---|---|---|---|---|---|---|---|---|---|---|---|---|---|---|---|---|---|---|---|---|---|---|---|---|
| Ground | A | H | A | A | H | A | H | A | H | A | H | A | H | A | H | H | A | H | H | A | H | A | H | A | H | A | H | A | H | A |
| Result | L | W | L | D | W | D | W | W | W | L | W | W | W | D | D | D | D | L | L | D | D | W | W | W | W | D | W | W | W | L |
| Position | 12 | 8 | 10 | 12 | 8 | 10 | 8 | 7 | 6 | 7 | 8 | 7 | 5 | 5 | 5 | 6 | 7 | 6 | 8 | 8 | 7 | 7 | 6 | 4 | 4 | 5 | 5 | 4 | 4 | 4 |

Updated to match(es) played on 8 May 2023. Source: See Results
A = Away; H = Home; W = Win; D = Draw; L = Loss

===== Matches =====
The league fixtures were announced on 15 June 2022.

| 9 July 2022 1 | CSKA 1948 | 1–0 | Levski Sofia | Bistritsa |
| 21:00 UTC+3 | Tsonkov (yellow card) 6' (yellow-red card) 45'; S. Aleksandrov (yellow card) 27'; Rusev 52'; Marin (yellow card) 59' | Report | Sundberg (yellow card) 37' van der Kaap (yellow card) 90+3' | Stadium: Bistritsa; Attendance: 800; Referee: Ivaylo Stoyanov (Petrich); Man of the Match: Georgi Rusev |

| 16 July 2022 2 | Levski Sofia | 5–0 | Spartak Varna | Sofia |
| 21:00 UTC+3 | Krastev 40' (pen.), 87'; Bari 69', 83'; Ronaldo (yellow card) 85'; Petkov 90+3' | Report | Dichevski (yellow card) 40'; El Anabi (yellow card) 66' | Stadium: Vivacom Arena - Georgi Asparuhov; Attendance: 4,442; Referee: Valentin Zhelezov (Burgas); Man of the Match: Filip Krastev |

| 7 August 2022 5 | Levski Sofia | 1–0 | Pirin Blagoevgrad | Sofia |
| 20:00 UTC+3 | Ronaldo 70' | Report | Stanoev (yellow card) 83' (yellow-red card) 85' | Stadium: Vivacom Arena - Georgi Asparuhov; Attendance: 5,500; Referee: Stanislav Todorov (Shumen); Man of the Match: Ronaldo |

| 20 August 2022 7 | Levski Sofia | 4–0 | Hebar | Sofia |
| 20:15 UTC+3 | Kraev (yellow card) 30'; Tsunami (yellow card) 35', (goal) 38'; Krastev 41'; Petkov 45+6' (pen.); Milanov 54' | Report | Tartov (yellow card) 14'; Bonanni (yellow card) 34'; Bukhal (yellow card) 40' | Stadium: Vivacom Arena - Georgi Asparuhov; Attendance: 5,000; Referee: Krasen Georgiev (Varna); Man of the Match: Georgi Milanov |

| 28 August 2022 8 | Botev Vratsa | 0–2 | Levski Sofia | Vratsa |
| 21:00 UTC+3 | Montoya (yellow card) 12' (yellow-red card) 42'; Mendoza (yellow card) 61'; Biatoumoussoka (yellow card) 90+2' | Report | Bari (yellow card) 9'; Kraev 30'; Krastev (yellow card) 82'; Stefanov 82'; Sundberg (red card) 88' | Stadium: Hristo Botev; Attendance: 4,500; Referee: Georgi Ginchev (Veliko Tarnovo); Man of the Match: Andrian Kraev |

| 5 September 2022 9 | Levski Sofia | 2–0 | Arda | Sofia |
| 20:00 UTC+3 | Kraev 20'; Petkov 87' | Report | Zhelev (yellow card) 68'; Yordanov (yellow card) 77'; Kokonov (yellow card) 90+2' | Stadium: Vivacom Arena - Georgi Asparuhov; Attendance: 3,899; Referee: Vladimir Valkov (Plovdiv); Man of the Match: Andrian Kraev |

| 10 September 2022 10 | Lokomotiv Sofia | 3–2 | Levski Sofia | Sofia |
| 18:45 UTC+3 | Miloshev 8', 52', (yellow card) 15'; Dias (yellow card) 88'; Dimitrov 90', (yellow card) 90+9'; Duarte (yellow card) 90+9' | Report | Milanov 18'; Kraev (yellow card) 34'; Tsunami (yellow card) 51'; Galchev 74' | Stadium: Lokomotiv; Attendance: 3,566; Referee: Valentin Zhelezov (Burgas); Man of the Match: Krasimir Miloshev |

| 18 September 2022 11 | Levski Sofia | 2–0 | CSKA Sofia | Sofia |
| 16:45 UTC+3 | Milanov (yellow card) 52'; Kraev (yellow card) 56'; Stefanov 78'; Welton 81' | Report | Youga (yellow card) 52' de Nooijer (yellow card) 74'; Turitsov (red card) 90'; Koch (yellow card) 90+6' | Stadium: Vasil Levski National Stadium; Attendance: 20,000; Referee: Dragomir Draganov (Varna); Man of the Match: Welton Felipe |

| 3 October 2022 12 | Beroe | 0–1 | Levski Sofia | Stara Zagora |
| 20:00 UTC+3 | Pirgov (yellow card) 6'; Georgiev (yellow card) 55'; Luizinho (yellow card) 74'; Mechev (yellow card) 88' | Report | Popov 3'; Krastev (yellow card) 32'; Petris (yellow card) 84' | Stadium: Beroe; Attendance: 4,320; Referee: Georgi Kabakov (Plovdiv); Man of the Match: Ivelin Popov |

| 8 October 2022 13 | Levski Sofia | 1–0 | Botev Plovdiv | Sofia |
| 20:00 UTC+3 | Stefanov 21', (yellow card) 75'; Kraev (yellow card) 79'; Shehu (yellow card) 89' | Report | Baroan (yellow card) 14'; Genev (yellow card) 40'; Rabeï (yellow card) 52'; Sekulić (yellow card) 78'; Hankić (yellow card) 89' | Stadium: Vivacom Arena - Georgi Asparuhov; Attendance: 9,000; Referee: Stanimir Trenchev (Sofia); Man of the Match: Iliyan Stefanov |

| 12 October 2022 3 | Slavia Sofia | 2–1 | Levski Sofia | Sofia |
| 17:15 UTC+3 | Ivanov 29', (yellow card) 81'; Dost (yellow card) 45+1'; Nguena 71' | Report | Krastev (yellow card) 11'; Petkov 90+3'; Tsunami (yellow card) 90+3' | Stadium: Aleksandar Shalamanov; Attendance: 1,200; Referee: Stanislav Todorov (Shumen); Man of the Match: Galin Ivanov |
Note: Originally scheduled for 24 July 2022, the match was postponed by the BFU due to Levski's participation in the UECL.

| 16 October 2022 14 | Septemvri Sofia | 0–0 | Levski Sofia | Sofia |
| 20:30 UTC+3 | I. Milanov (yellow card) 27'; Arsov (yellow card) 39'; Kabov (yellow card) 67'; Todorov (yellow card) 90+6' | Report | van der Kaap (yellow card) 77'; Sundberg (yellow card) 88' | Stadium: Vasil Levski National Stadium; Attendance: 2,500; Referee: Georgi Davidov (Veliko Tarnovo); Man of the Match: Dimitar Sheytanov |

| 22 October 2022 15 | Levski Sofia | 1–1 | Lokomotiv Plovdiv | Sofia |
| 19:45 UTC+3 | Popov 18', (yellow card) 61' | Report | Giovanny 75'; Vasilev (yellow card) 89'; Iliev (yellow card) 90+5'; Horkaš (yellow card) 90+6' | Stadium: Vivacom Arena - Georgi Asparuhov; Attendance: 8,500; Referee: Dragomir Draganov (Varna); Man of the Match: Ivelin Popov |

| 29 October 2022 16 | Levski Sofia | 0–0 | CSKA 1948 | Sofia |
| 17:30 UTC+3 | Kraev (yellow card) 56'; Milanov (yellow card) 82' | Report | Héliton (yellow card) 11'; Petrov (yellow card) 21'; Kirilov (yellow card) 27'; Umarbayev (yellow card) 90'; Ohene (yellow card) 90+5'; Lyaskov (yellow card) FT | Stadium: Vivacom Arena - Georgi Asparuhov; Attendance: 10,300; Referee: Georgi Ginchev (Veliko Tarnovo); Man of the Match: Plamen Andreev |

| 2 November 2022 4 | Cherno More | 0–0 | Levski Sofia | Varna |
| 17:15 UTC+2 | Velev (yellow card) 11'; Panayotov (yellow card) 41'; Fernandes (yellow card) 46'; Zlatev (yellow card) 66'; Coureur (yellow card) 71' | Report | Tsunami (yellow card) 59'; Milanov (yellow card) 74' | Stadium: Ticha; Attendance: 7,300; Referee: Georgi Davidov (Veliko Tarnovo); Man of the Match: Viktor Popov |
Note: Originally scheduled for 1 August 2022, the match was postponed by the BFU due to Levski's participation in the UECL.

| 6 November 2022 17 | Spartak Varna | 2–2 | Levski Sofia | Varna |
| 14:45 UTC+2 | Vasev (yellow card) 17'; Emanuel (yellow card) 27'; Klimentov 48'; Dimov 66'; Boev (yellow card) 80'; Borisov (yellow card) 88'; Ivey (yellow card) 90+3' | Report | Krastev 25', 51'; Kraev (yellow card) 34'; Ronaldo (yellow card) 63'; Petris (yellow card) 66'; Sundberg (yellow card) 79' | Stadium: Spartak; Attendance: 5,000; Referee: Nikola Popov (Sofia); Man of the Match: Zdravko Dimitrov |

| 12 November 2022 18 | Levski Sofia | 1–2 | Slavia Sofia | Sofia |
| 17:30 UTC+2 | Popov 20', (yellow card) 21', (penalty missed) 55'; Kraev (yellow card) 56' | Report | Popadiyn (yellow card) 13'; Soares (yellow card) 45+1'; Ivanov (yellow card) 54'; Viyachki (yellow card) 75', (goal) 77'; Dost 89' | Stadium: Vivacom Arena - Georgi Asparuhov; Attendance: 4,788; Referee: Georgi Kabakov (Plovdiv); Man of the Match: Galin Ivanov |

| 1 December 2022 6 | Ludogorets Razgrad | 0–0 | Levski Sofia | Razgrad |
| 15:00 UTC+2 | Cauly (yellow card) 54'; Piotrowski (yellow card) 62'; Naressi (yellow card) 82'; Rick (yellow card) 84'; Verdon (yellow card) 86' | Report | van der Kaap (yellow card) 7'; Milanov (yellow card) 66'; Córdoba (yellow card) 73'; Petkov (yellow card) 77'; Popov (yellow card) 86'; Kraev (yellow card) 88'; Mitkov (yellow card) 90+7' | Stadium: Huvepharma Arena; Attendance: 1,200; Referee: Stanislav Todorov (Shumen); Man of the Match: Noah Sonko Sundberg |
Note: Originally scheduled for 14 August 2022, the match was postponed by the BFU due to both teams' participation in UEFA competitions.

| 11 February 2023 19 | Levski Sofia | 0–1 | Cherno More | Veliko Tarnovo (Note: Due to a punishment on Levski by the BFU, the match was played at a neutral ground.) |
| 12:30 UTC+2 | Sundberg (yellow card) 37'; Chandarov (yellow card) 45+2'; Tsunami (yellow card) 90+1' | Report | Fernandes (yellow card) 13'; Vasilev 35'; Bosančić (yellow card) 65'; Soula (yellow card) 68' | Stadium: Ivaylo; Attendance: 5,500; Referee: Nikola Popov (Sofia); Man of the Match: Aleksandar Vasilev |

| 19 February 2023 20 | Pirin Blagoevgrad | 1–1 | Levski Sofia | Blagoevgrad |
| 15:15 UTC+2 | Smolenski 45'; Bengyuzov (yellow card) 64'; Hubchev (yellow card) 69'; Dyulgerov (yellow card) 69'; Georgiev (yellow card) 69'; A. Yordanov (yellow card) 72'; Shokolarov (yellow card) 77' | Report | Chandarov 14' (pen.); Córdoba (yellow card) 59'; Galchev (yellow card) 72'; Popov (yellow card) 75' | Stadium: Hristo Botev; Attendance: 6,000; Referee: Dragomir Draganov (Varna); Man of the Match: Yanko Georgiev |

| 28 February 2023 21 | Levski Sofia | 0–0 | Ludogorets Razgrad | Sofia |
| 17:45 UTC+2 | Popov (yellow card) 44'; Tsunami (yellow card) 63'; Petris (yellow card) 82' | Report | Naressi (yellow card) 56'; Russo (yellow card) 62'; Show (yellow card) 69'; Gonçalves (yellow card) 72'; Yankov (yellow card) 82' | Stadium: Vivacom Arena - Georgi Asparuhov; Attendance: 8,500; Referee: Georgi Kabakov (Plovdiv); Man of the Match: Anton Nedyalkov |

| 5 March 2023 22 | Hebar | 0–2 | Levski Sofia | Pazardzhik |
| 14:15 UTC+2 | Mazáň (yellow card) 6'; M. Mihaylov (yellow card) 30'; Bozhurkin (yellow card) 45' | Report | Ricardinho 18', 73'; Tsunami (yellow card) 62' | Stadium: Georgi Benkovski; Attendance: 4,500; Referee: Georgi Ginchev (Veliko Tarnovo); Man of the Match: Ricardinho |

| 11 March 2023 23 | Levski Sofia | 2–0 | Botev Vratsa | Sofia |
| 17:30 UTC+2 | Kraev (penalty missed) 5'; Welton 24'; Petris 40'; Popov (yellow card) 54' | Report | Da Sylva (yellow card) 4'; Mendoza (yellow card) 86' | Stadium: Vivacom Arena - Georgi Asparuhov; Attendance: 5,000; Referee: Dragomir Draganov (Varna); Man of the Match: Ivelin Popov |

| 19 March 2023 24 | Arda | 0–3 | Levski Sofia | Kardzhali |
| 14:30 UTC+2 | | Report | Ronaldo 6'; Ricardinho 32'; Popov 49' (pen.); Chandarov (yellow card) 79'; Sundberg (yellow card) 90' | Stadium: Arena Arda; Attendance: 3,566; Referee: Radoslav Gidzhenov (Plovdiv); Man of the Match: Ivelin Popov |

| 8 April 2023 25 | Levski Sofia | 1–0 | Lokomotiv Sofia | Sofia |
| 20:00 UTC+3 | Krastev 45+2'; Petkov (yellow card) 90+2' | Report | Vutov (yellow card) 30'; Miloshev (yellow card) 57'; Naydenov (yellow card) 62'; Celso (yellow card) 82'; Bruno Franco (yellow card) 90+1' | Stadium: Vivacom Arena - Georgi Asparuhov; Attendance: 5,500; Referee: Volen Chinkov (Sofia); Man of the Match: Filip Krastev |

| 17 April 2023 26 | CSKA Sofia | 0–0 | Levski Sofia | Sofia |
| 17:30 UTC+3 | Heintz (yellow card) 36'; Vion (yellow card) 40'; Youga (yellow card) 45'; Mattheij (yellow card) 80' de Nooijer (yellow card) 88'; Busatto (yellow card) 90+1' | Report | Kraev (yellow card) 12'; Tsunami (yellow card) 60'; Welton (yellow card) 64'; Popov (penalty missed) 90' | Stadium: Vasil Levski National Stadium; Attendance: 18,547; Referee: Nikola Popov (Sofia); Man of the Match: Gustavo Busatto |

| 23 April 2023 27 | Levski Sofia | 1–0 | Beroe | Sofia |
| 20:00 UTC+3 | Chandarov (yellow card) 80', (goal) 90+5'; Petkov (yellow card) 90+3'; Popov (yellow card) 90+7' | Report | Cascardo (yellow card) 35'; Lambulić (yellow card) 53'; Moise (yellow card) 81'; Henrique (yellow card) 86'; Triboulet (yellow card) 90+9' | Stadium: Vivacom Arena - Georgi Asparuhov; Attendance: 4,500; Referee: Vladimir Valkov (Plovdiv); Man of the Match: Asen Chandarov |

| 29 April 2023 28 | Botev Plovdiv | 0–1 | Levski Sofia | Plovdiv |
| 20:00 UTC+3 | Kolev (yellow card) 90+2'; Souprayen (yellow card) 90+6'; Sekulić (yellow card) 90+12' | Report | Welton (yellow card) 21'; Ricardinho 65'; Chandarov (yellow card) 76'; Krastev (yellow card) 90+7' | Stadium: Hristo Botev; Attendance: 17,876; Referee: Nikola Popov (Sofia); Man of the Match: Ricardinho |

| 4 May 2023 29 | Levski Sofia | 2–0 | Septemvri Sofia | Sofia |
| 20:30 UTC+3 | Ricardinho 27'; Kraev (red card) 55'; Andreev (yellow card) 55'; Krastev (yellow card) 69'; Ronaldo 76' | Report | Cheshmedjiev (yellow card) 60'; Stojanovski (yellow card) 72'; Stanoev (yellow card) 73'; Jakubiak (yellow card) 76'; Aleksandrov (yellow card) 83' | Stadium: Vivacom Arena - Georgi Asparuhov; Attendance: 2,865; Referee: Radoslav Gidzhenov (Plovdiv); Man of the Match: Ronaldo |

| 8 May 2023 30 | Lokomotiv Plovdiv | 1–0 | Levski Sofia | Plovdiv |
| 17:45 UTC+3 | Karakashev (yellow card) 42'; Giovanny 60', (yellow card) 88'; Iliev (yellow card) 90+3'; Pe. Andreev (yellow card) 90+5'; Pirgov (yellow card) 90+8' | Report | Petris (yellow card) 90' | Stadium: Lokomotiv; Attendance: 3,427; Referee: Dragomir Draganov (Varna); Man of the Match: Giovanny |

==== Championship round ====
===== League table =====
| Pos | Team | Pld | W | D | L | GF | GA | GD | Pts | Qualification |
|---|---|---|---|---|---|---|---|---|---|---|
| 1 | Ludogorets Razgrad (C) | 35 | 26 | 7 | 2 | 81 | 27 | +54 | 85 | Qualification for the Champions League first qualifying round |
| 2 | CSKA Sofia | 35 | 26 | 6 | 3 | 65 | 17 | +48 | 84 | Qualification for the Europa Conference League second qualifying round |
| 3 | CSKA 1948 | 35 | 17 | 13 | 5 | 55 | 28 | +27 | 64 | Qualification for the Europa Conference League second qualifying round |
| 4 | Levski Sofia (O) | 35 | 17 | 10 | 8 | 47 | 22 | +25 | 61 | Qualification for the Europa Conference League play-off |
| 5 | Lokomotiv Plovdiv | 35 | 15 | 9 | 11 | 35 | 34 | +1 | 54 (Note: Head-to-head points: Lokomotiv Plovdiv 3, Cherno More 3. Head-to-head goal difference: Lokomotiv Plovdiv +2, Cherno More -2.) | |
| 6 | Cherno More | 35 | 15 | 9 | 11 | 39 | 35 | +4 | 54 | |

Source: Soccerway, Bulgarian Football
Rules for classification: 1) Points; 2) Head-to-head points; 3) Head-to-head goal difference; 4) Head-to-head goals scored; 5) Head-to-head away goals scored (only if two teams); 6) Goal difference; 7) Goals scored; 8) Fairplay ranking; 9) Draw.
(C) Champions; (O) Play-off winners

===== Results summary =====
| Overall | | | | | | | | Home | | | | | | Away | | | | | |
| Pld | W | D | L | GF | GA | GD | Pts | W | D | L | GF | GA | GD | W | D | L | GF | GA | GD |
|---|---|---|---|---|---|---|---|---|---|---|---|---|---|---|---|---|---|---|---|
| 5 | 2 | 1 | 2 | 9 | 8 | +1 | 7 | 1 | 0 | 1 | 2 | 3 | −1 | 1 | 1 | 1 | 7 | 5 | +2 |

Last updated: 7 June 2023.
Source: See results

===== Results by round =====
| Round | 1 | 2 | 3 | 4 | 5 |
|---|---|---|---|---|---|
| Ground | A | A | H | A | H |
| Result | D | W | W | L | L |
| Position | 4 | 4 | 4 | 4 | 4 |

Source: See Results
A = Away; H = Home; W = Win; D = Draw; L = Loss

===== Matches =====
| 14 May 2023 31 | CSKA 1948 | 2–2 | Levski Sofia | Bistritsa |
| 20:00 UTC+3 | Chochev 2'; Umarbayev 48'; Kolev (yellow card) 90+3' | Report | Ricardinho 18'; Welton 25'; Petris (yellow card) 36' van der Kaap (yellow card) 74' | Stadium: Bistritsa; Attendance: 500; Referee: Georgi Ginchev (Veliko Tarnovo); Man of the Match: Plamen Andreev |

| 20 May 2023 32 | Lokomotiv Plovdiv | 0–3 | Levski Sofia | Plovdiv |
| 20:00 UTC+3 | Pirgov (yellow card) 18'; Karakashev (yellow card) 26'; Zebli (yellow card) 39' | Report | Ricardinho 35'; Popov 40', (yellow card) 41'; Krastev 79'; El Jemili (yellow card) 81'; Chandarov (yellow card) 83' | Stadium: Lokomotiv; Attendance: 5,000; Referee: Stanislav Todorov (Shumen); Man of the Match: Ivelin Popov |

| 26 May 2023 33 | Levski Sofia | 2–1 | Cherno More | Sofia |
| 20:30 UTC+3 | Ricardinho 17', 71'; Ronaldo (yellow card) 45+2' van der Kaap (yellow card) 90+6' | Report | Machado 12', (yellow card) 90+8'; Panov (yellow card) 14'; Dimov (yellow card) 42'; Vasilev (yellow card) 53'; Dyulgerov (yellow card) 71'; Drobarov (yellow card) 89' | Stadium: Vivacom Arena - Georgi Asparuhov; Attendance: 3,222; Referee: Georgi Kabakov (Plovdiv); Man of the Match: Ricardinho |

| 3 June 2023 34 | Ludogorets Razgrad | 3–2 | Levski Sofia | Razgrad |
| 20:30 UTC+3 | Despodov 23' (pen.); Plastun (yellow card) 42'; Nonato (yellow card) 44'; Piotrowski 66'; Thiago 72', (yellow card) 73' | Report | Stefanov (yellow card) 15', (goal) 33'; Krastev 60' | Stadium: Huvepharma Arena; Attendance: 5,733; Referee: Nikola Popov (Sofia); Man of the Match: Kiril Despodov |

| 7 June 2023 35 | Levski Sofia | 0–2 | CSKA Sofia | Sofia |
| 18:45 UTC+3 | Sundberg (yellow card) 72' (yellow-red card) 80' | Report | Heintz 35'; Geferson (yellow card) 58'; Nazon (yellow card) 59', (goal) 61'; Vion (yellow card) 62'; Turitsov (red card) 79'; Busatto (yellow card) 79'; Youga (yellow card) 90+2' | Stadium: Vasil Levski National Stadium; Attendance: 17,233; Referee: Dragomir Draganov (Varna); Man of the Match: Tobias Heintz |

==== European play-off final ====
| 11 June 2023 | Levski Sofia | 2–0 | Arda | Sofia |
| 19:00 UTC+3 | Welton 36', 58', (yellow card) 87'; Andreev (yellow card) 71'; Mitkov (yellow card) 76'; Tsunami (yellow card) 90+3' | Report | Toungara (yellow card) 5'; A. Petkov (yellow card) 38'; Borukov (yellow card) 41'; Gospodinov (yellow card) 67'; Georgiev (yellow card) 79'; Stoev (yellow card) 90+3' | Stadium: Vivacom Arena - Georgi Asparuhov; Attendance: 10,000; Referee: Radoslav Gidzhenov (Plovdiv); Man of the Match: Welton Felipe |

=== Bulgarian Cup ===
| 19 November 2022 Round of 32 | Vihren | 1–4 | Levski Sofia | Sandanski |
| 13:30 UTC+2 | Udoji 7', (yellow card) 72'; Georgiev (yellow card) 35'; Ivanov (yellow card) 54'; Tameghi (yellow card) 57'; Hristov (yellow card) 61'; Ghilas (yellow card) 90+1' | Report | Ronaldo 24'; Kraev 31'; Welton 64'; Milanov 72' (pen.) | Stadium: Spartak; Attendance: 4,778; Referee: Ivaylo Nenkov (Sofia) |

| 4 December 2022 Round of 16 | Ludogorets Razgrad | 2–1 | Levski Sofia | Razgrad |
| 13:30 UTC+2 | Piotrowski (yellow card) 24'; Thiago 69'; Tekpetey 79'; Verdon (yellow card) 90+9' | Report | van der Kaap (yellow card) 12'; Córdoba (yellow card) 41', (penalty missed) 90'; Welton 60'; Kraev (yellow card) 90+2' | Stadium: Huvepharma Arena; Attendance: 4,200; Referee: Georgi Davidov (Veliko Tarnovo) |

=== Bulgarian Supercup ===
| 1 September 2022 | Ludogorets Razgrad | 2–2 (4–3 p) | Levski Sofia | Sofia |
| 20:00 UTC+3 | Verdon (yellow card) 23'; Tekpetey (yellow card) 26'; Piotrowski (yellow card) 38'; Cicinho (yellow card) 45+1'; Despodov 68', 72' (pen.); Plastun (yellow card) 71'; Thiago (yellow card) 76'; Rick (yellow card) 79' | Report | Córdoba (yellow card) 7'; Kraev (yellow card) 25'; Milanov 41'; Stefanov (yellow card) 47'; Andreev (yellow card) 70' van der Kaap (yellow card) 77', (goal) 90+2' | Stadium: Vasil Levski National Stadium; Attendance: 21,342; Referee: Georgi Kabakov (Plovdiv) |
| | Penalties |
| | Cauly (penalty scored); Rick (penalty missed); Cicinho (penalty scored); Thiago (penalty scored); Verdon (penalty scored) | | (penalty scored) Popov; (penalty missed) Petkov; (penalty scored) Córdoba; (penalty scored) Bari; (penalty missed) Mitkov |

=== UEFA Europa Conference League ===
==== Second qualifying round ====
| 21 July 2022 1st leg | Levski Sofia (Bulgaria) | 2–0 | (Greece) PAOK | Sofia, Bulgaria |
| 20:00 UTC+3 | Welton 1', (yellow card) 28'; Bari 19'; Galchev (yellow card) 75' | Report | A. Živković (yellow card) 56'; Kurtić (yellow card) 81'; Douglas Augusto (yellow card) 84'; Sastre (yellow card) 90' | Stadium: Vivacom Arena - Georgi Asparuhov; Attendance: 14,123; Referee: Jérémie Pignard (France) |

| 28 July 2022 2nd leg | PAOK (Greece) | 1–1 (1–3 agg.) | (Bulgaria) Levski Sofia | Thessaloniki, Greece |
| 20:30 UTC+3 | Kurtić (yellow card) 13'; Dantas 56'; Kargas (yellow card) 63'; Douglas Augusto (yellow card) 64' (yellow-red card) 72'; Vieirinha (yellow card) 80' (yellow-red card) 81'; Ingason (yellow card) 86' | Report | Ronaldo 25'; Bari (yellow card) 72'; Krastev (yellow card) 77' van der Kaap (yellow card) 89' | Stadium: Toumba; Attendance: 15,000; Referee: César Soto Grado (Spain) |

==== Third qualifying round ====
| 4 August 2022 1st leg | Hamrun Spartans (Malta) | 0–1 | (Bulgaria) Levski Sofia | Ta' Qali, Malta (Note: Ħamrun Spartans are playing their home matches at the National Stadium, Ta' Qali, instead of their regular venue, the Victor Tedesco Stadium, Hamrun, which does not meet UEFA requirements.) |
| 19:30 UTC+2 | Borg (yellow card) 8'; Guillaumier (yellow card) 10' | Report | Krastev (penalty missed) 11', 90+5'; Córdoba (yellow card) 43' | Stadium: National Stadium; Attendance: 3,135; Referee: Willy Delajod (France) |

| 11 August 2022 2nd leg | Levski Sofia (Bulgaria) | 1–2 (a.e.t.) (2–2 agg.) (1–4 p) | (Malta) Hamrun Spartans | Sofia, Bulgaria |
| 21:00 UTC+3 | Tsunami 90+1'; Welton (yellow card) 103' | Report | Bjeličić (yellow card) 3'; Corbalan (yellow card) 3'; Guillaumier 78'; Callegari (yellow card) 88'; Camenzuli 90+2'; Dodô (yellow card) 106'; Freitas (yellow card) pso | Stadium: Vivacom Arena - Georgi Asparuhov; Attendance: 16,480; Referee: István Kovács (Romania) |
| | Penalties |
| | Petkov (penalty scored); Tsunami (penalty missed); Krastev (penalty missed) | | (penalty scored) Freitas; (penalty scored) Montebello; (penalty scored) Guillaumier; (penalty scored) Fedele |

== Squad statistics ==
=== Appearances and goals ===
As of 11 June 2023

| No. | Pos | Nat | Player | Total | | First League | | Bulgarian Cup | | Bulgarian Supercup | | Conference League | |
| No. | Pos | Nat | Player | Apps | Goals | Apps | Goals | Apps | Goals | Apps | Goals | Apps | Goals |
|---|---|---|---|---|---|---|---|---|---|---|---|---|---|
| 1 | GK | (Bulgaria) BUL | Plamen Andreev | 35 | 0 | 33 | 0 | 1 | 0 | 1 | 0 | 0 | 0 |
| 2 | DF | (France) FRA | Jeremy Petris | 31 | 1 | 23+3 | 1 | 0 | 0 | 1 | 0 | 4 | 0 |
| 5 | DF | (Netherlands) NED | Kellian van der Kaap | 35 | 1 | 18+10 | 0 | 2 | 0 | 1 | 1 | 4 | 0 |
| 6 | DF | (Brazil) BRA | Wenderson Tsunami | 37 | 2 | 30+1 | 1 | 2 | 0 | 1 | 0 | 2+1 | 1 |
| 8 | MF | (Bulgaria) BUL | Andrian Kraev | 37 | 3 | 28+3 | 2 | 2 | 1 | 1 | 0 | 1+2 | 0 |
| 9 | FW | (Brazil) BRA | Ricardinho | 17 | 9 | 17 | 9 | 0 | 0 | 0 | 0 | 0 | 0 |
| 10 | MF | (Bulgaria) BUL | Ivelin Popov | 31 | 5 | 23+4 | 5 | 1+1 | 0 | 0+1 | 0 | 0+1 | 0 |
| 11 | FW | (Spain) ESP | Jawad El Jemili | 11 | 0 | 2+9 | 0 | 0 | 0 | 0 | 0 | 0 | 0 |
| 13 | GK | (Bulgaria) BUL | Nikolay Mihaylov | 8 | 0 | 3 | 0 | 1 | 0 | 0 | 0 | 4 | 0 |
| 14 | MF | (Bulgaria) BUL | Iliyan Stefanov | 30 | 4 | 14+12 | 4 | 0+1 | 0 | 1 | 0 | 0+2 | 0 |
| 17 | FW | (Brazil) BRA | Welton Felipe | 42 | 8 | 34+1 | 5 | 2 | 2 | 1 | 0 | 4 | 1 |
| 18 | FW | (Brazil) BRA | Ronaldo | 41 | 5 | 32+2 | 3 | 2 | 1 | 1 | 0 | 4 | 1 |
| 19 | FW | (Morocco) MAR | Bilal Bari | 11 | 3 | 3+3 | 2 | 0 | 0 | 0+1 | 0 | 4 | 1 |
| 20 | MF | (Bulgaria) BUL | Asen Chandarov | 17 | 2 | 5+12 | 2 | 0 | 0 | 0 | 0 | 0 | 0 |
| 21 | DF | (Croatia) CRO | Ante Blažević | 1 | 0 | 1 | 0 | 0 | 0 | 0 | 0 | 0 | 0 |
| 22 | DF | (Bulgaria) BUL | Patrick-Gabriel Galchev | 20 | 1 | 8+7 | 1 | 1+1 | 0 | 0 | 0 | 2+1 | 0 |
| 23 | DF | (The Gambia) GAM | Noah Sonko Sundberg | 37 | 0 | 32 | 0 | 1 | 0 | 0 | 0 | 4 | 0 |
| 27 | MF | (Bulgaria) BUL | Asen Mitkov | 21 | 0 | 2+14 | 0 | 1+1 | 0 | 0+1 | 0 | 0+2 | 0 |
| 30 | MF | (Bulgaria) BUL | Filip Krastev | 40 | 9 | 33+1 | 8 | 1 | 0 | 1 | 0 | 4 | 1 |
| 33 | DF | (Panama) PAN | José Córdoba | 31 | 0 | 25 | 0 | 1 | 0 | 1 | 0 | 4 | 0 |
| 50 | DF | (Bulgaria) BUL | Kristian Dimitrov | 9 | 0 | 3+6 | 0 | 0 | 0 | 0 | 0 | 0 | 0 |
| 71 | MF | (Bulgaria) BUL | Antoan Stoyanov | 0 | 0 | 0 | 0 | 0 | 0 | 0 | 0 | 0 | 0 |
| 88 | FW | (Bulgaria) BUL | Marin Petkov | 40 | 4 | 8+26 | 4 | 1 | 0 | 0+1 | 0 | 0+4 | 0 |
| 99 | GK | (Bulgaria) BUL | Ivan Andonov | 0 | 0 | 0 | 0 | 0 | 0 | 0 | 0 | 0 | 0 |
Players from the reserve team:
| 16 | DF | (Bulgaria) BUL | Aleksandar Bozhilov | 1 | 0 | 0+1 | 0 | 0 | 0 | 0 | 0 | 0 | 0 |
| 24 | FW | (Bulgaria) BUL | Borislav Rupanov | 7 | 0 | 1+5 | 0 | 0+1 | 0 | 0 | 0 | 0 | 0 |
| 39 | DF | (Bulgaria) BUL | Dimitar Andonov | 1 | 0 | 0 | 0 | 0+1 | 0 | 0 | 0 | 0 | 0 |
| 41 | MF | (Bulgaria) BUL | Kristiyan Yovov | 1 | 0 | 0+1 | 0 | 0 | 0 | 0 | 0 | 0 | 0 |
| 42 | DF | (Bulgaria) BUL | Denis Dinev | 1 | 0 | 0 | 0 | 0+1 | 0 | 0 | 0 | 0 | 0 |
| 77 | DF | (Bulgaria) BUL | Deyvid Mihalev | 2 | 0 | 0+2 | 0 | 0 | 0 | 0 | 0 | 0 | 0 |
Players away from the club on loan:
| 4 | MF | (Curaçao) CUW | Nathan Holder | 5 | 0 | 0+3 | 0 | 0+1 | 0 | 0 | 0 | 0+1 | 0 |
| 11 | MF | (Bulgaria) BUL | Zdravko Dimitrov | 0 | 0 | 0 | 0 | 0 | 0 | 0 | 0 | 0 | 0 |
Players who left the club during the season:
| 4 | DF | (Bulgaria) BUL | Ivan Goranov | 0 | 0 | 0 | 0 | 0 | 0 | 0 | 0 | 0 | 0 |
| 7 | MF | (Bulgaria) BUL | Georgi Milanov | 24 | 4 | 15+3 | 2 | 2 | 1 | 1 | 1 | 3 | 0 |
| 10 | MF | (Bulgaria) BUL | Radoslav Tsonev | 0 | 0 | 0 | 0 | 0 | 0 | 0 | 0 | 0 | 0 |
| 12 | MF | (Nigeria) NGR | Shehu Abdullahi | 9 | 0 | 3+5 | 0 | 1 | 0 | 0 | 0 | 0 | 0 |
| 20 | MF | (Bulgaria) BUL | Dimitar Kostadinov | 0 | 0 | 0 | 0 | 0 | 0 | 0 | 0 | 0 | 0 |
| 91 | DF | (Switzerland) SUI | Dragan Mihajlović | 0 | 0 | 0 | 0 | 0 | 0 | 0 | 0 | 0 | 0 |

=== Clean sheets ===
As of 11 June 2023

| Rank | Goalkeeper | FPL | BC | BSC | UECL | Total |
|---|---|---|---|---|---|---|
| 1 | (Bulgaria) Plamen Andreev | 22 | 0 | 0 | 0 | 22 |
| 2 | (Bulgaria) Nikolay Mihaylov | 1 | 0 | 0 | 2 | 3 |
| Total | | 23 | 0 | 0 | 2 | 25 |

=== Disciplinary record ===
Includes all competitive matches.

| N | P | Nat. | Name | First League | | | Bulgarian Cup | | | Bulgarian Supercup | | | Conference League | | | Total | | | Notes |
| N | P | Nat. | Name | Yellow card | Second yellow card | Red card | Yellow card | Second yellow card | Red card | Yellow card | Second yellow card | Red card | Yellow card | Second yellow card | Red card | Yellow card | Second yellow card | Red card | Notes |
| 1 | GK | (Bulgaria) | Plamen Andreev | 2 | | | | | | 1 | | | | | | 3 | | | |
| 2 | DF | (France) | Jeremy Petris | 5 | | | | | | | | | | | | 5 | | | |
| 5 | DF | (Netherlands) | Kellian van der Kaap | 5 | | | 1 | | | 1 | | | 1 | | | 8 | | | |
| 6 | DF | (Brazil) | Wenderson Tsunami | 9 | | | | | | | | | | | | 9 | | | |
| 7 | MF | (Bulgaria) | Georgi Milanov | 4 | | | | | | | | | | | | 4 | | | |
| 8 | MF | (Bulgaria) | Andrian Kraev | 9 | | 1 | 1 | | | 1 | | | | | | 11 | | 1 | |
| 10 | MF | (Bulgaria) | Ivelin Popov | 8 | | | | | | 1 | | | | | | 9 | | | |
| 11 | FW | (Spain) | Jawad El Jemili | 1 | | | | | | | | | | | | 1 | | | |
| 12 | MF | (Nigeria) | Shehu Abdullahi | 1 | | | | | | 1 | | | | | | 2 | | | |
| 14 | MF | (Bulgaria) | Iliyan Stefanov | 2 | | | | | | 1 | | | | | | 3 | | | |
| 17 | FW | (Brazil) | Welton Felipe | 3 | | | | | | | | | 2 | | | 5 | | | |
| 18 | FW | (Brazil) | Ronaldo | 3 | | | | | | | | | | | | 3 | | | |
| 19 | FW | (Morocco) | Bilal Bari | 1 | | | | | | | | | 1 | | | 2 | | | |
| 20 | MF | (Bulgaria) | Asen Chandarov | 5 | | | | | | | | | | | | 5 | | | |
| 22 | DF | (Bulgaria) | Patrick-Gabriel Galchev | 1 | | | | | | | | | 1 | | | 2 | | | |
| 23 | DF | (The Gambia) | Noah Sonko Sundberg | 5 | 1 | 1 | | | | | | | | | | 5 | 1 | 1 | |
| 27 | MF | (Bulgaria) | Asen Mitkov | 2 | | | | | | | | | | | | 2 | | | |
| 30 | MF | (Bulgaria) | Filip Krastev | 5 | | | | | | | | | 1 | | | 6 | | | |
| 33 | DF | (Panama) | José Córdoba | 2 | | | 1 | | | 1 | | | 1 | | | 5 | | | |
| 88 | FW | (Bulgaria) | Marin Petkov | 3 | | | | | | | | | | | | 3 | | | |

Last updated: 11 June 2023
Source: soccerway
Ordered by (red card) , (second yellow card) and (yellow card)
(yellow card) = Number of bookings; (second yellow card) = Number of sending offs after a second yellow card; (red card) = Number of sending offs by a direct red card.
