= Kraev =

Kraev (Bulgarian: Краев, Russian: Краев) is a Slavic masculine surname, its feminine counterpart is Kraeva. Notable people with the surname include:

- Andrian Kraev (born 1999), Bulgarian footballer
- Bozhidar Kraev (born 1997), Bulgarian footballer
