= Ricardinho (footballer, born 2001) =

Brazilian footballer

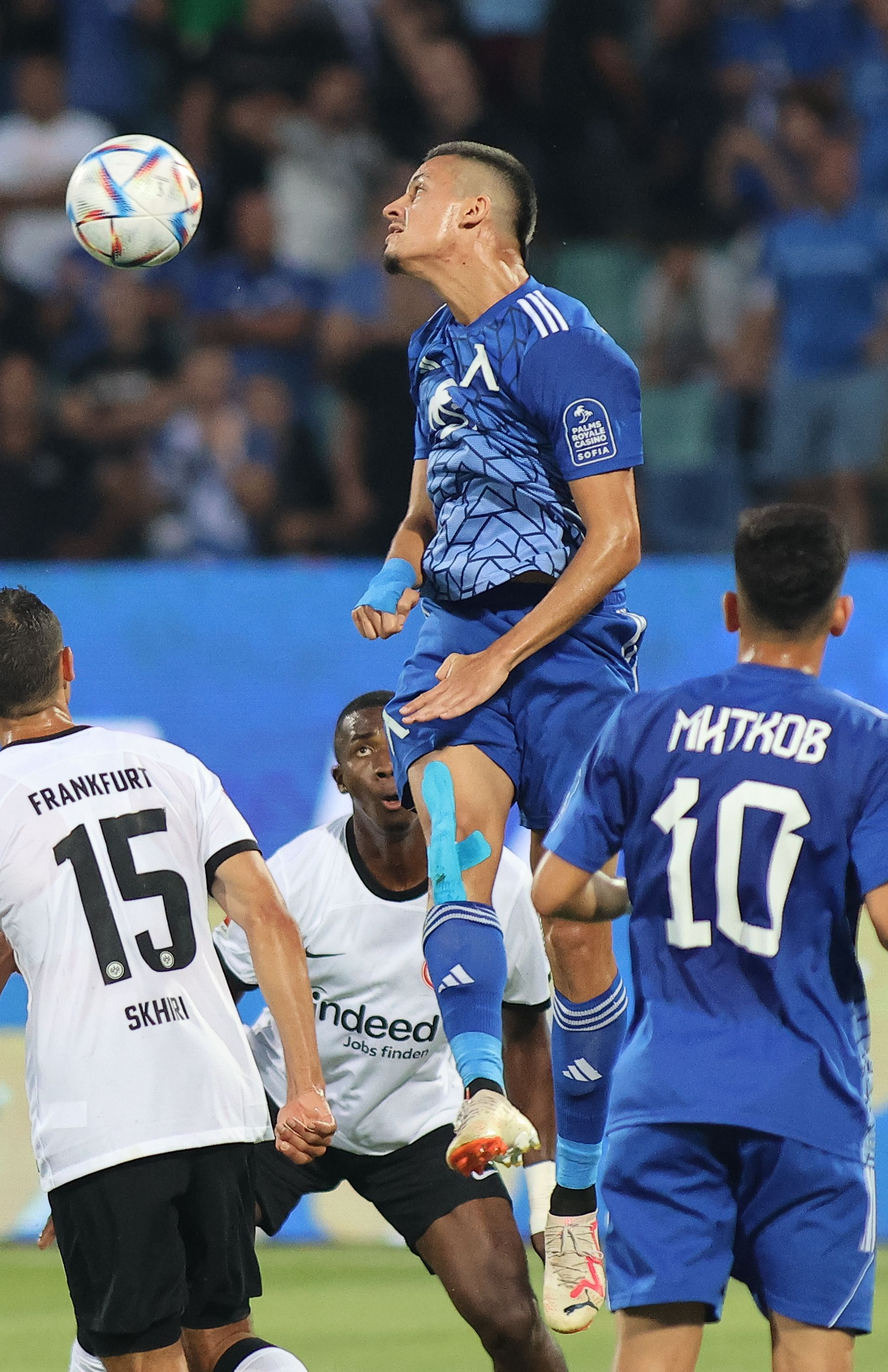
- Ricardinho (centre) in 2023

Personal information
- Full name: Ricardo Viana Filho
- Date of birth: 23 April 2001 (age 25)
- Place of birth: Guarulhos, Brazil
- Height: 1.81 m (5 ft 11 in)
- Positions: Striker; winger

Team information
- Current team: Asteras Tripolis
- Number: 39

Youth career
- 2016–2020: São Paulo
- 2020: Grêmio

Senior career*
Years	Team	Apps	(Gls)
2021–2022	Grêmio	29	(5)
2021–2022	→ Marítimo (loan)	11	(1)
2022	→ Atlético Goianiense (loan)	6	(0)
2023–2024	Levski Sofia	48	(18)
2024–2026	Viktoria Plzeň	3	(0)
2024	→ Viktoria Plzeň B	5	(3)
2025	→ Maccabi Haifa (loan)	10	(1)
2025–2026	→ Kairat (loan)	15	(2)
2026–	Asteras Tripolis	5	(0)
- * Club domestic league appearances and goals as of 20 September 2026

Ricardo Viana Filho (born 23 April 2001), known as Ricardinho, is a Brazilian professional footballer who plays mainly as a striker for Super League Greece club Asteras Tripolis.

== Career ==
=== Grêmio ===
Born in Guarulhos, Ricardinho joined the Grêmio's Academy at the age of 19 in 2020.

=== Marítimo ===
On 1 September 2021, he joined Portuguese club Marítimo on loan. On his Primeira Liga debut for Marítimo on 13 September 2021, he scored a goal in a 2–2 draw against Arouca.

=== Levski Sofia ===
On 20 December 2022, Ricardinho signed a three-year deal with Bulgarian First League club Levski Sofia. On 29 April 2023, he made history as the first player to score on the newly renovated Hristo Botev Stadium in a 1–0 win against Botev Plovdiv.

=== Viktoria Plzeň ===
On 3 July 2024, Ricardinho signed a three-year deal with Czech First League club Viktoria Plzeň.

=== Maccabi Haifa (loan) ===
On 17 January 2025, Ricardinho joined Israeli Premier League club Maccabi Haifa on a half-year loan deal with option to make transfer permanent.

=== Kairat (loan) ===
On 19 June 2025, Ricardinho joined Kazakhstan Premier League club Kairat on a one-year loan deal without option to make transfer permanent. On 12 May 2026, Kairat announced that Ricardinho had left the club after his loan deal was ended early.

=== Asteras Tripolis ===
On 15 July 2026, Ricardinho signed for Asteras Tripolis on a free transfer.

== Personal life ==
Ricardinho is the son of Ricardo Viana, corporal of the military police of São Paulo. He has 2 sisters. In 2021 he lost his father and his grandfather to the COVID-19.

== Career statistics ==
As of match played 10 May 2026

Appearances and goals by club, season and competition
Club	Season	League			State League		National cup		Continental		Other		Total	
Club	Season	Division	Apps	Goals	Apps	Goals	Apps	Goals	Apps	Goals	Apps	Goals	Apps	Goals
Grêmio	2021	Série A	12	1	10 (Note: Appearance(s) in Campeonato Gaúcho and Recopa Gaúcha.)	4	4	2	5 (Note: Two appearances and one goal in Copa Libertadores, three appearances and one goal in Copa Sudamericana.)	2	—		31	9
Grêmio	2022	Série B	7	0	0	0	0	0	0	0	—		7	0
Grêmio	Total		19	1	10	4	4	2	2	0	0	0	38	9
Marítimo (loan)	2021–22	Primeira Liga	11	1	—		1	0	—		0	0	12	1
Atlético Goianiense (loan)	2022	Série A	6	0	0	0	2	0	1 (Note: One appearances and in Copa Sudamericana.)	0	—		9	0
Levski Sofia	2022–23	First League	17	9	—		0	0	0	0	—		17	9
Levski Sofia	2023–24	First League	31	9	—		2	2	6 (Note: Two appearances in the UEFA Europa Conference League)	0	—		39	11
Levski Sofia	Total		48	18	0	0	2	2	6	0	0	0	56	20
Maccabi Haifa (loan)	2024–25	Israeli Premier League	10	1	—		1	0	—		—		11	1
Kairat (loan)	2025	Kazakhstan Premier League	9	2	—		0	0	13 (Note: Appearances in UEFA Champions League)	0	—		22	2
Kairat (loan)	2026	Kazakhstan Premier League	6	0	—		1	0	2	1	1 (Note: Appearance in Kazakhstan Super Cup)	0	10	1
Kairat (loan)	Total		15	2	—		1	0	15	1	1	0	32	3
Career total			109	23	10	4	11	4	23	7	1	0	158	32

== Honours ==
Grêmio

- Campeonato Gaúcho: 2021
- Recopa Gaúcha: 2021, 2022
