= Asen Chandarov =

Bulgarian footballer

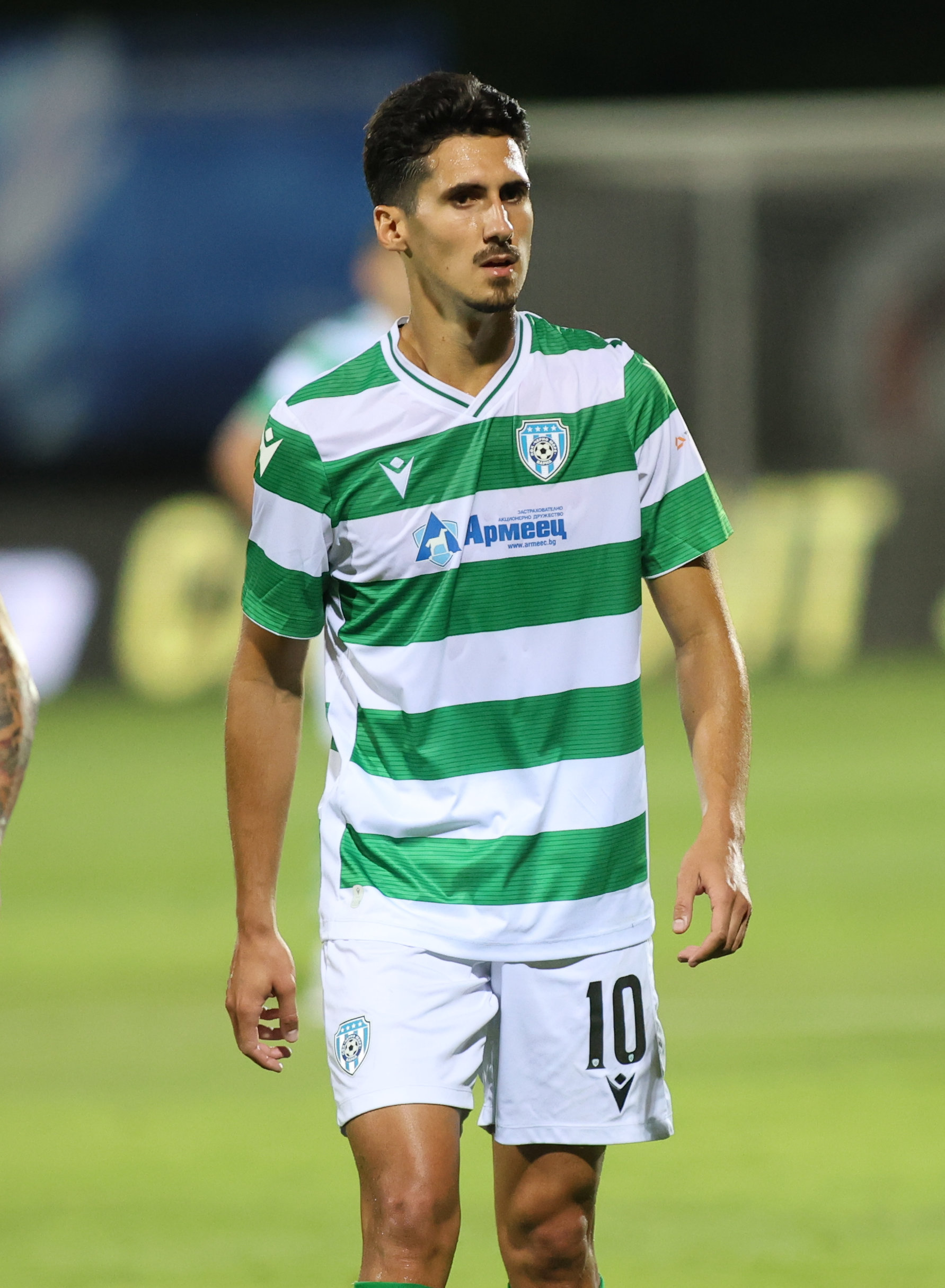

Personal information
- Full name: Asen Rumenov Chandarov
- Date of birth: 13 November 1998 (age 28)
- Place of birth: Sofia, Bulgaria
- Height: 1.85 m (6 ft 1 in)
- Position: Attacking midfielder

Team information
- Current team: Botev Plovdiv
- Number: 10

Youth career
- Levski Sofia
- –2015: DIT Sofia

Senior career*
Years	Team	Apps	(Gls)
2015–2016	Septemvri Sofia	8	(2)
2016	→ Pirin Razlog (loan)	12	(3)
2016	Botev Plovdiv	5	(0)
2016–2020	Septemvri Sofia	66	(8)
2019	→ Levski Sofia (loan)	3	(0)
2020–2022	Academica Clinceni	35	(3)
2022–2023	Septemvri Sofia	26	(5)
2023–2025	Levski Sofia	43	(2)
2024–2025	→ Septemvri Sofia (loan)	25	(3)
2025–2026	Cherno More	35	(5)
2026–	Botev Plovdiv	9	(6)

International career^{‡}
2014–2015	Bulgaria U17	7	(0)
2016–2017	Bulgaria U19	7	(2)
2019–2020	Bulgaria U21	5	(0)
2026–	Bulgaria	3	(1)
- * Club domestic league appearances and goals as of 08:01, 16 September 2026 (UTC) ‡ National team caps and goals as of 3 October 2026

Asen Rumenov Chandarov (Bulgarian: Асен Руменов Чандъров; born 13 November 1998) is a Bulgarian professional footballer who plays as a midfielder for First League club Botev Plovdiv and the Bulgaria national team.

== Career ==
=== DIT, Septemvri and Pirin ===
Chandarov bеgan his youth career in DIT Sofia academy. In 2015 DIT, which was owned by his father Rumen Chandarov, bought Septemvri Sofia and Chandarov was promoted to the first team. In the beginning of 2016 he was sent on loan to Pirin Razlog until the end of the season.

=== Botev Plovdiv ===
Chandarov begin the summer camp with Botev Plovdiv and later signed with the team. On 30 July 2016 he made his debut for the team in Parva Liga in a match against Lokomotiv Plovdiv.

=== Return to Septemvri ===
Soon after his father left Botev, Chandarov also left the club and returned to Septemvri Sofia. He made his second debut for the team on 12 September 2016 in a match against Etar Veliko Tarnovo. On 29 October he scored the first goal for the 3:0 win against Tsarsko Selo. On 29 March 2017 it was announced that due to injury got in the last match with Bulgaria U19, Chandarov would miss the end of season 2016-17 and the European Under-19 Championship in July 2017. Chandarov returned in play on 30 November 2017 in a league match against CSKA Sofia, coming on as a substitute.

== International career ==
=== Youth levels ===
Chandarov was called up for the Bulgaria U19 team for the 2017 European Under-19 Championship qualification from 22 to 27 March 2017. With him playing in all three matches, Bulgaria qualified for the final tournament.

=== Senior ===
On 26 September 2026, Chandarov made his debut for the Bulgaria national team in a 2026–27 UEFA Nations League C game against Luxembourg, scoring Bulgaria's goal in a 1–2 loss.

== Career statistics ==
=== Club ===
As of 26 May 2026

Club performance			League		Cup		Continental		Other		Total	
Club	League	Season	Apps	Goals	Apps	Goals	Apps	Goals	Apps	Goals	Apps	Goals
Septemvri Sofia	V Group	2015–16	8	2	0	0	–		–		8	2
Pirin Razlog (loan)	B Group	2015-16	12	3	0	0	–		–		12	3
Botev Plovdiv	First League	2016–17	5	0	0	0	–		–		5	0
Septemvri Sofia	Second League	2016–17	15	3	2	0	–		–		17	3
Septemvri Sofia	First League	2017–18	16	1	0	0	–		–		16	1
Septemvri Sofia	First League	2018–19	34	4	1	0	–		–		35	4
Septemvri Sofia	Second League	2019–20	3	0	0	0	–		–		3	0
Septemvri Sofia	Second League	2020–21	2	0	0	0	–		–		2	0
Septemvri Sofia	Second League	2021–22	2	0	0	0	–		–		2	0
Septemvri Sofia	Total		72	8	3	0	–		–		75	8
Levski Sofia	First League	2019–20	3	0	1	0	0	0	–		4	0
Academica Clinceni	Liga I	2020–21	22	2	1	0	–		–		23	2
Academica Clinceni	Liga I	2021–22	13	1	1	1	–		–		14	2
Academica Clinceni	Total		35	3	2	1	–		–		37	4
Septemvri Sofia	Second League	2021–22	13	4	1	0	–		–		14	4
Septemvri Sofia	First League	2022–23	13	1	2	0	–		–		15	1
Septemvri Sofia	Total		26	5	3	0	–		–		29	5
Levski Sofia	First League	2022–23	17	2	–		–		–		17	2
Levski Sofia	First League	2023–24	26	0	2	0	3	0	–		31	0
Levski Sofia	Total		43	2	2	0	3	0	–		48	2
Septemvri Sofia (loan)	First League	2024–25	25	3	0	0	–		–		25	3
Cherno More	First League	2025–26	35	5	2	0	2	0	–		39	5
Career statistics			264	31	13	1	5	0	0	0	282	32

=== International ===
As of 3 October 2026

Appearances and goals by national team and year
National team	Year	Apps	Goals
Bulgaria	2026	3	1
Total		3	1

As of match played 26 September 2026
Scores and results list Bulgaria's goal tally first, score column indicates score after each Chandarov goal.

List of international goals scored by Asen Chandarov
No.	Date	Venue	Opponent	Score	Result	Competition
1	26 September 2026	Hristo Botev Stadium, Plovdiv, Bulgaria	Luxembourg	1–0	1–2	2026–27 UEFA Nations League C
