= Noah Sonko Sundberg =

Swedish footballer (born 1996)

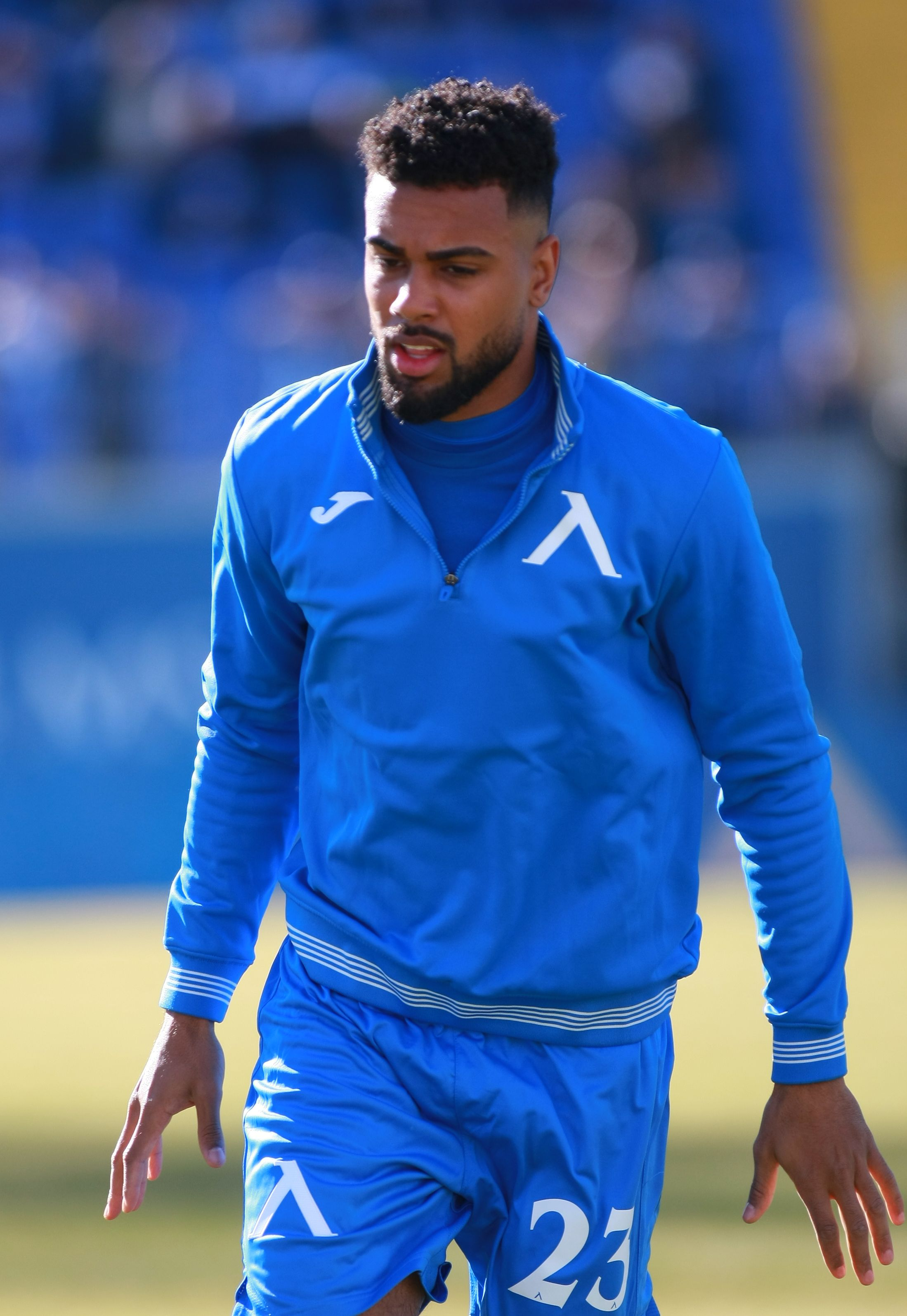
- Sonko Sundberg warming up for Levski in 2022

Personal information
- Full name: Noah Kemeseng Sonko Sundberg
- Date of birth: 6 June 1996 (age 30)
- Place of birth: Stockholm, Sweden
- Height: 1.87 m (6 ft 1 1/2 in)
- Position: Defender

Team information
- Current team: Göztepe
- Number: 19

Youth career
- –2009: Enskede IK
- 2010–2013: AIK

Senior career*
Years	Team	Apps	(Gls)
2013–2017	AIK	29	(2)
2016–2017	→ GIF Sundsvall (loan)	51	(4)
2018–2021	Östersunds FK	98	(5)
2022–2023	Levski Sofia	44	(1)
2023–2026	Ludogorets Razgrad	19	(0)
2024–2025	→ Sivasspor (loan)	27	(2)
2025–2026	→ Aris (loan)	12	(0)
2026	Aris	0	(0)
2026–	Göztepe	2	(0)

International career^{‡}
2011–2013	Sweden U17	21	(2)
2013–2015	Sweden U19	14	(0)
2015–2016	Sweden U21	4	(0)
2020–	Gambia	18	(0)
- * Club domestic league appearances and goals as of 18 October 2026 ‡ National team caps and goals as of 24 January 2024 (UTC)

Noah Kemeseng Sonko Sundberg (born 6 June 1996) is a professional footballer who plays as a defender for Turkish Süper Lig club Göztepe. A former youth international for Sweden, he plays for the Gambia national team.

== Club career ==
Born to a Gambian mother and a Swedish father, Sonko Sundberg joined AIK as a youth player in early 2010. In the summer of 2013 he was moved up to the first team where he made his first team debut in a friendly against Manchester United. On 2 June 2014 he made his Allsvenskan debut at home against IF Brommapojkarna.

He was loaned out to fellow Allsvenskan club GIF Sundsvall in both 2016 and 2017, being an important member of their squad beside fellow central defender Marcus Danielsson.

On 9 January 2018, Sonko Sundberg transferred to Östersunds FK on a permanent deal from AIK, signing a four-year deal with his new club.

On 4 November 2021, Sonko Sundberg signed a 2 1/2-year deal with Bulgarian club Levski Sofia, which came into effect on 1 January 2022, once his contract with Östersunds had ended.

On 26 July 2023, he was transferred to fellow Bulgarian club Ludogorets Razgrad for an undisclosed fee.

On 9 July 2026, Sonko Sundberg joined Göztepe on a two-year deal, with a third-year option.

== International career ==
In September 2013, Sonko Sundberg was selected to the Sweden men's national under-17 football team that would compete in the 2013 FIFA U-17 World Cup. On 2 October 2020, he was called up by the senior Gambia national team. He debuted with Gambia in a friendly 1–0 win over Congo on 9 October 2020. In January 2024, Sonko Sundberg was included in the country's squad for the 2023 Africa Cup of Nations.

== Club statistics ==
As of 27 May 2025

Club	Season	Division	League		Cup		Europe		Total	
Club	Season	Division	Apps	Goals	Apps	Goals	Apps	Goals	Apps	Goals
AIK	2014	Allsvenskan	5	1	2	1	1	0	8	2
AIK	2015	Allsvenskan	24	1	2	0	5	0	31	1
AIK	2016	Allsvenskan	0	0	1	0	0	0	1	0
AIK	Total		29	2	5	1	6	0	40	3
GIF Sundsvall (loan)	2016	Allsvenskan	23	3	1	0	0	0	24	3
GIF Sundsvall (loan)	2017	Allsvenskan	28	1	1	0	0	0	29	1
GIF Sundsvall (loan)	Total		51	4	2	0	0	0	53	4
Östersunds FK	2018	Allsvenskan	21	1	1	0	0	0	22	1
Östersunds FK	2019	Allsvenskan	28	1	4	0	0	0	32	1
Östersunds FK	2020	Allsvenskan	25	2	3	0	0	0	28	2
Östersunds FK	2021	Allsvenskan	24	1	4	0	0	0	28	1
Östersunds FK	2022	Allsvenskan	0	0	1	0	0	0	1	0
Östersunds FK	Total		98	5	13	0	0	0	111	5
Levski Sofia	2021–22	First League	11	1	4	0	0	0	15	1
Levski Sofia	2022–23	First League	32	0	1	0	4	0	37	0
Levski Sofia	2023–24	First League	1	0	0	0	0	0	1	0
Levski Sofia	Total		44	1	5	0	4	0	53	1
Ludogorets Razgrad	2023–24	First League	19	0	5	1	11	1	35	2
Ludogorets Razgrad	2024–25	First League	0	0	0	0	1	0	1	0
Ludogorets Razgrad	Total		19	0	5	1	12	1	36	2
Sivasspor (loan)	2024–25	Süper Lig	26	2	1	0	0	0	27	2
Career Total			267	14	31	2	22	1	320	17

== Honours ==
Sweden U17

- FIFA U-17 World Cup third place: 2013

Levski Sofia

- Bulgarian Cup: 2021–22

Ludogorets Razgrad

- Bulgarian First League: 2023–24
- Bulgarian Supercup: 2023
