= José Córdoba =

Panamanian footballer (born 2001)

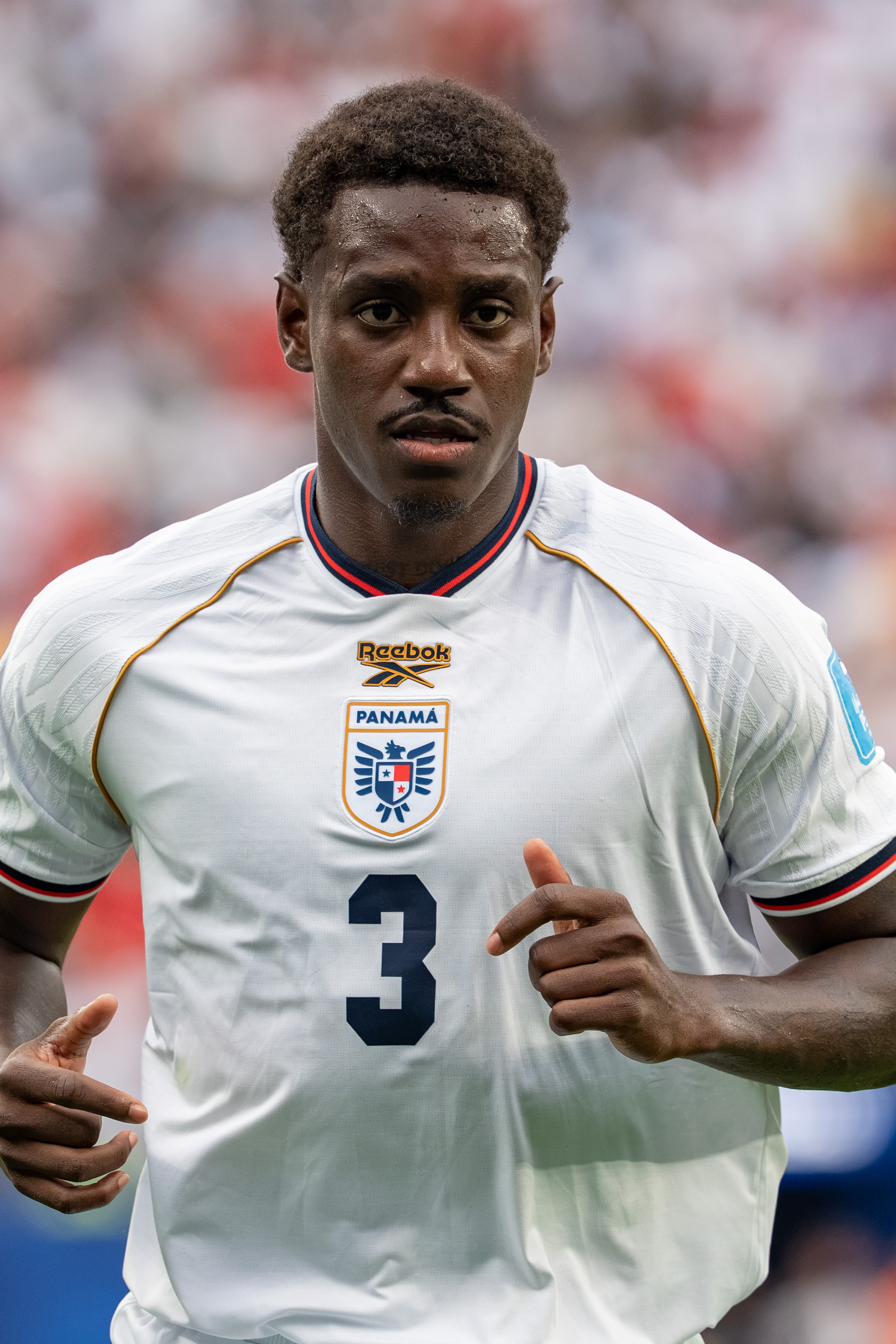
- Córdoba with Panama in 2026

Personal information
- Full name: José Angel Córdoba Chambers
- Date of birth: 3 June 2001 (age 25)
- Place of birth: Panama City, Panama
- Height: 1.85 m (6 ft 1 in)
- Position: Defender

Team information
- Current team: Norwich City
- Number: 33

Youth career
- 2007–2018: Independiente

Senior career*
Years	Team	Apps	(Gls)
2018–2020	Independiente	12	(0)
2020	Celta B	0	(0)
2021–2022	Etar Veliko Tarnovo	18	(0)
2021–2022	→ Levski Sofia (loan)	20	(0)
2022–2024	Levski Sofia	54	(0)
2024–	Norwich City	74	(3)

International career^{‡}
2022	Panama U20	2	(0)
2022–	Panama	35	(1)
Medal record
Men's football
Representing Panama
CONCACAF Nations League
Runner-up	2025 United States	Team
- * Club domestic league appearances and goals as of 04:19, 16 November 2026 (UTC) ‡ National team caps and goals as of 23:43, 27 June 2026 (UTC)

José Ángel Córdoba Chambers (born 3 June 2001) is a Panamanian professional footballer who plays as a defender for EFL Championship club Norwich City and the Panama national team.

== Club career ==
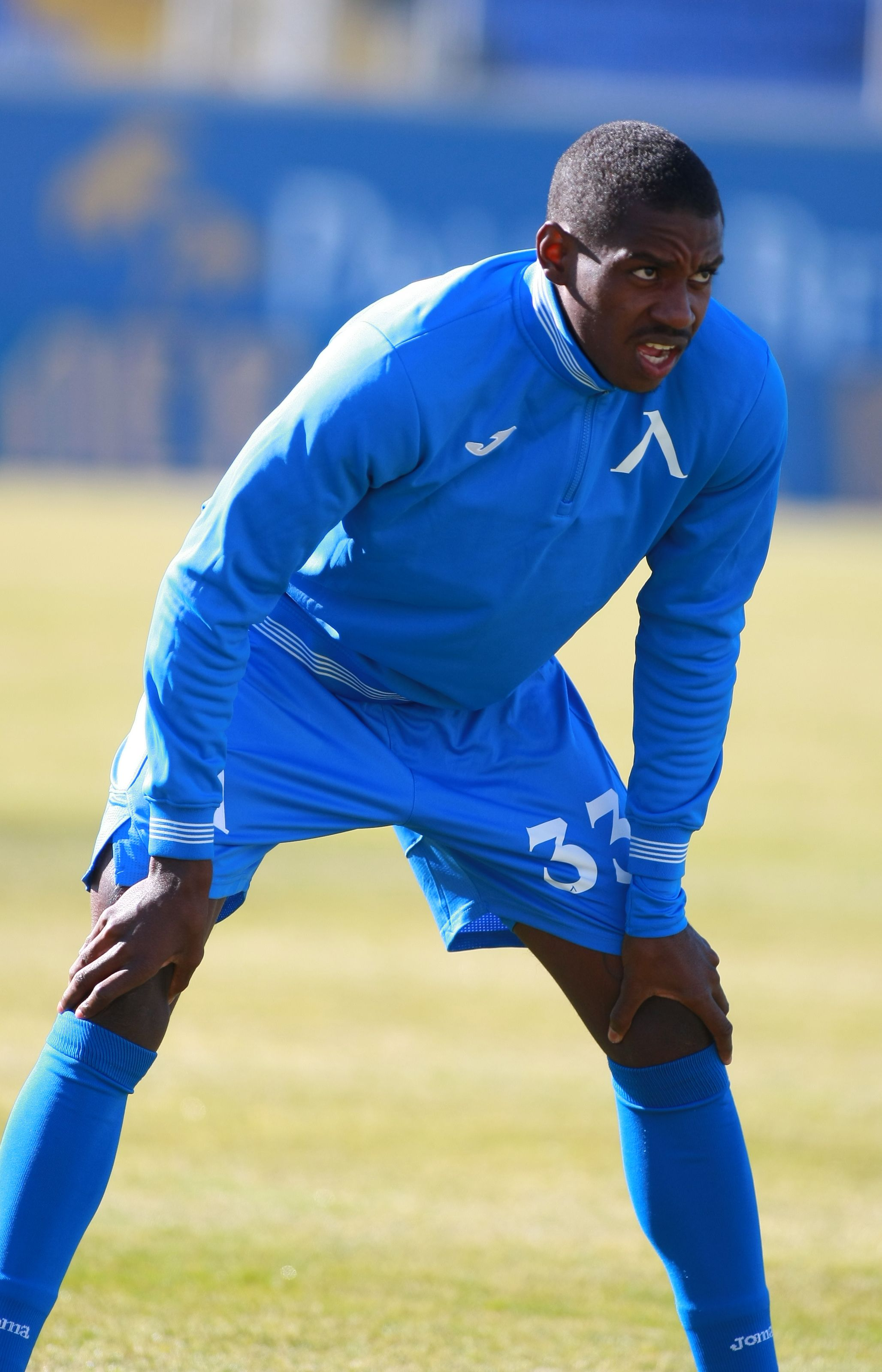
Córdoba warming up for Levski Sofia in 2022

=== Independiente de La Chorrera and Celta Vigo ===
Córdoba started in the youth ranks and began his professional football career at Independiente de La Chorrera. In 2020 he was transferred to Spanish club Celta Vigo, but did not manage to break through in the senior team and made appearances mainly with the reserve team.

=== SFC Etar Veliko Tarnovo and Levski Sofia (loan) ===
In 2020, he went on a trial with Bulgarian side Etar Veliko Tarnovo. Córdoba had a second trial with Etar before head coach Aleksandar Tomash decided to sign him on a permanent contract. Córdoba made ten appearances in the Bulgarian First League during the second half of the 2020–21 season. The club however got relegated, but Córdoba decided to stay with Etar in the Second League and appeared in eight more games before being loaned to Levski Sofia for one year with option to buy in September 2021. On 5 April 2022, he signed with Levski on a permanent deal until 2025, coming into effect on 1 July 2022.

=== Norwich City ===
On 5 June 2024, Córdoba transferred to EFL Championship club Norwich City. His first full league start was in a 4–1 home victory against Watford and he scored his first goal for the club in a defeat against Burnley at Carrow Road on 15 December.

== International career ==
In March 2022 Córdoba got his first call-up for the national team of Panama for the 2022 FIFA World Cup qualification matches against Honduras, USA and Canada. He made his debut in the final qualifier of the campaign against Canada, playing full 90 minutes in a 1–0 win.

Córdoba was called up for the 2026 FIFA World Cup.

== Career statistics ==
=== Club ===
As of match played 31 October 2026

Appearances and goals by club, season and competition
Club	Season	League			National cup (Note: Includes Bulgarian Cup, FA Cup)		League cup (Note: Incluedes EFL Cup)		Continental		Other		Total	
Club	Season	Division	Apps	Goals	Apps	Goals	Apps	Goals	Apps	Goals	Apps	Goals	Apps	Goals
Independiente de La Chorrera	2018–19	Liga Panameña	4	0	0	0	—		—		—		4	0
Independiente de La Chorrera	2019–20	Liga Panameña	8	0	0	0	—		0	0	—		8	0
Independiente de La Chorrera	Total		12	0	0	0	—		0	0	—		12	0
Etar Veliko Tarnovo	2020–21	First League	10	0	1	0	—		—		—		11	0
Etar Veliko Tarnovo	2021–22	First League	8	0	0	0	—		—		—		8	0
Etar Veliko Tarnovo	Total		18	0	1	0	—		—		—		19	0
Levski Sofia (loan)	2021–22	First League	20	0	4	0	—		—		—		24	0
Levski Sofia	2022–23	First League	25	0	1	0	—		4 (Note: Appearances in UEFA Europa Conference League)	0	1 (Note: Appearance in Bulgarian Supercup)	0	31	0
Levski Sofia	2023–24	First League	29	0	0	0	—		4	0	—		33	0
Levski Sofia	Total		54	0	1	0	—		8	0	1	0	64	0
Norwich City	2024–25	Championship	34	1	1	0	1	0	—		0	0	36	1
Norwich City	2025–26	Championship	28	1	1	0	0	0	—		—		29	1
Norwich City	2026–27	Championship	12	1	0	0	1	0	—		—		13	1
Norwich City	Total		74	3	2	0	2	0	—		0	0	78	3
Career total			178	3	8	0	2	0	8	0	1	0	197	3

=== International ===
As of match played 27 June 2026

Appearances and goals by national team and year
National team	Year	Apps	Goals
Panama	2022	3	0
Panama	2023	7	0
Panama	2024	11	0
Panama	2025	7	0
Panama	2026	7	1
Total		35	1

Scores and results list Panama's goal tally first.

List of international goals scored by José Córdoba
No.	Date	Venue	Opponent	Score	Result	Competition
1	31 March 2026	Cape Town Stadium, Cape Town, South Africa	South Africa	1–0	2–1	Friendly

== Honours ==
Independiente

- Liga Panameña de Fútbol Clausura: 2018–19

Levski Sofia

- Bulgarian Cup: 2021–22

Panama

- CONCACAF Nations League runner-up: 2024–25

Individual

- Bulgarian First League Best Defender: 2023
