= Welton Felipe (footballer, born 1997) =

Brazilian footballer

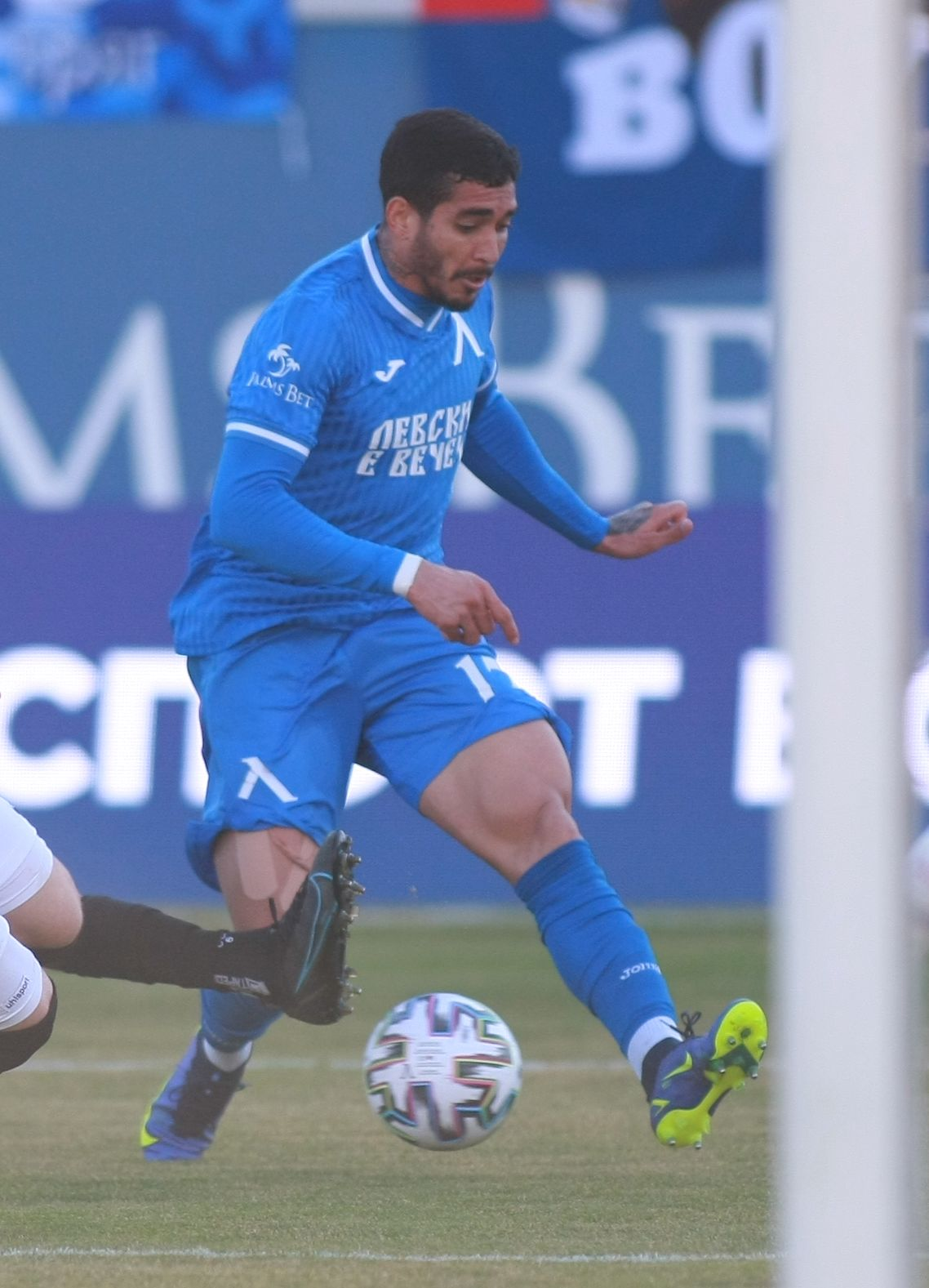
- Welton in action for Levski

Personal information
- Full name: Welton Felipe Paraguá de Melo
- Date of birth: 6 August 1997 (age 29)
- Place of birth: Paranavaí, Brazil
- Height: 1.74 m (5 ft 9 in)
- Positions: Winger; forward

Team information
- Current team: Gamba Osaka
- Number: 97

Senior career*
| Years | Team | Apps | (Gls) |
| 2018–2019 | Maringá | 21 | (3) |
| 2018 | → XV de Piracicaba (loan) | 0 | (0) |
| 2020–2021 | Botafogo-PB | 21 | (5) |
| 2022–2024 | Levski Sofia | 61 | (10) |
| 2024– | Gamba Osaka | 58 | (7) |
- * Club domestic league appearances and goals as of 9 August 2026

Welton Felipe Paraguá de Melo (born 6 August 1997), commonly known as Welton Felipe, Chimbinha or simply Welton, is a Brazilian professional footballer who plays as a winger or forward for J1 League club Gamba Osaka.

== Career ==
Welton started his career with Maringá in 2018 and was loaned to XV de Piracicaba later that year. In January 2021, he became a new player of Botafogo-PB and scored 5 goals in 21 matches of the Campeonato Brasileiro Série C.

On 4 January 2022, Welton signed for Levski Sofia on a three-year contract. The player signed for Gamba Osaka of Japan's J.League on 11 February 2024.

== Career statistics ==
As of 7 December 2023

Appearances and goals by club, season and competition
| Club | Season | League | | | State League | | Cup | | Continental | | Other | | Total | |
| Club | Season | Division | Apps | Goals | Apps | Goals | Apps | Goals | Apps | Goals | Apps | Goals | Apps | Goals |
|---|---|---|---|---|---|---|---|---|---|---|---|---|---|---|
| Maringá | 2018 | Série D | 0 | 0 | 4 (Note: Appearances in the Campeonato Paranaense) | 0 | 0 | 0 | – | | 0 | 0 | 4 | 0 |
| Maringá | 2019 | Série D | 6 | 0 | 11 | 3 | 0 | 0 | – | | 0 | 0 | 17 | 3 |
| Maringá | Total | | 6 | 0 | 15 | 3 | 0 | 0 | 0 | 0 | 0 | 0 | 21 | 3 |
| XV de Piracicaba (loan) | 2018 | – | | | 0 (Note: Appearances in the Campeonato Paulista A2) | 0 | 0 | 0 | – | | 0 | 0 | 0 | 0 |
| Botafogo-PB | 2020 | Série C | 0 | 0 | ? (Note: Appearances in the Campeonato Paraibano) | 1 | 8 (Note: Appearances in the Copa do Nordeste) | 2 | – | | 0 | 0 | 8+ | 3 |
| Botafogo-PB | 2021 | Série C | 21 | 5 | 0 | 0 | 2 | 1 | – | | 0 | 0 | 23 | 6 |
| Botafogo-PB | Total | | 21 | 5 | ? | 1 | 10 | 3 | 0 | 0 | 0 | 0 | 31+ | 9 |
| Levski Sofia | 2021–22 | Parva Liga | 10 | 2 | – | | 4 | 1 | – | | 0 | 0 | 14 | 3 |
| Levski Sofia | 2022–23 | Parva Liga | 35 | 5 | – | | 2 | 2 | 4 | 1 | 1 | 0 | 42 | 8 |
| Levski Sofia | 2023–24 | Parva Liga | 15 | 3 | – | | 1 | 1 | 6 | 2 | 0 | 0 | 22 | 6 |
| Levski Sofia | Total | | 60 | 10 | 0 | 0 | 7 | 4 | 10 | 3 | 1 | 0 | 78 | 17 |
| Career total | | | 87 | 15 | 15+ | 4 | 17 | 7 | 10 | 3 | 1 | 0 | 130+ | 29 |

== Honours ==
Gamba Osaka

- AFC Champions League Two: 2025–26

Levski Sofia

- Bulgarian Cup: 2021–22

Individual

- Bulgarian First League Goal of the Week: 2021–22 (Week 25) v. Pirin Blagoevgrad
- Best forward in Bulgarian football: 2023
