= Marin Petkov (footballer) =

Bulgarian footballer

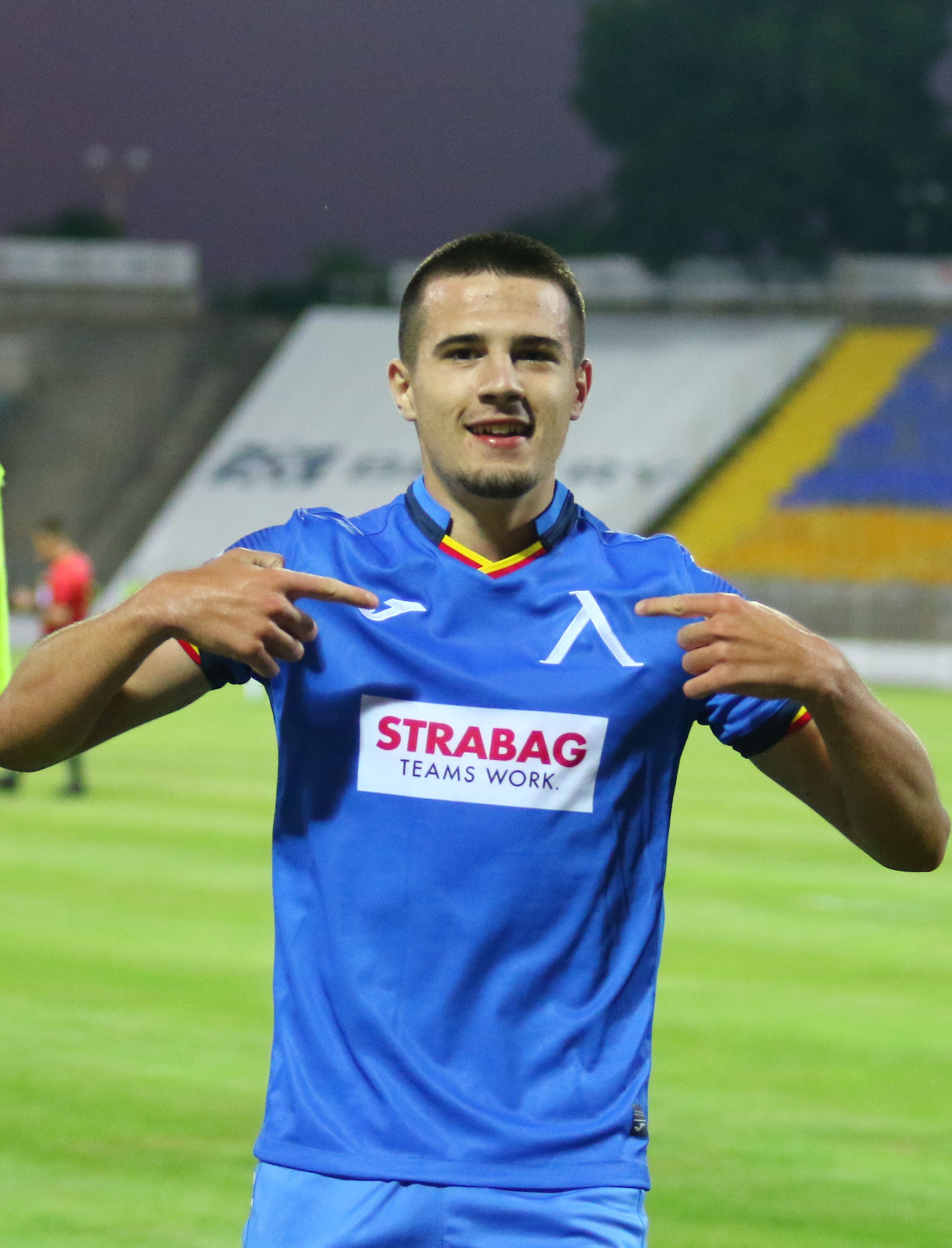
- Petkov with Levski Sofia in 2021

Personal information
- Full name: Marin Plamenov Petkov
- Date of birth: 2 October 2003 (age 23)
- Place of birth: Etropole, Bulgaria
- Height: 1.75 m (5 ft 9 in)
- Positions: Winger; attacking midfielder

Team information
- Current team: Al Taawoun
- Number: 88

Youth career
- 2014–2021: Levski Sofia

Senior career*
Years	Team	Apps	(Gls)
2019–2026	Levski Sofia	164	(33)
2026–	Al Taawoun	27	(2)

International career^{‡}
2020	Bulgaria U17	1	(0)
2020–2021	Bulgaria U19	2	(1)
2021–2024	Bulgaria U21	13	(2)
2022–	Bulgaria	31	(7)
Medal record
Men's football
Representing Bulgaria
FIFA Series
Winner	2026 Indonesia
- * Club domestic league appearances and goals as of 31 October 2026 (UTC) ‡ National team caps and goals as of 20:14, 16 November 2026 (UTC)

Marin Plamenov Petkov (Bulgarian: Марин Пламенов Петков; born 2 October 2003) is a Bulgarian professional footballer who plays mainly as a winger and attacking midfielder for Saudi Pro League club Al Taawoun and the Bulgaria national team. А versatile player, he can also be deployed as a wing-back and centre-forward.

== Club career ==
Petkov is a youth exponent from Levski Sofia. He signed his first professional contract with the club on 11 January 2020.

== International career ==
On 5 September 2022, Petkov received his first call-up for the senior Bulgaria national team for the UEFA Nations League games against Gibraltar and North Macedonia on 23 and 26 September 2022. Petkov made his debut in the match against Gibraltar and scored the last goal in a 5–1 win by Bulgaria.

== Career statistics ==
=== Club ===
As of match played 3 May 2026

Appearances and goals by club, season and competition
Club	Season	League			National cup (Note: Includes Bulgarian Cup)		Continental		Other		Total	
Club	Season	Division	Apps	Goals	Apps	Goals	Apps	Goals	Apps	Goals	Apps	Goals
Levski Sofia	2019–20	Bulgarian First League	4	0	0	0	0	0	—		4	0
Levski Sofia	2020–21	Bulgarian First League	15	2	2	1	—		—		17	3
Levski Sofia	2021–22	Bulgarian First League	29	4	6	2	—		—		35	6
Levski Sofia	2022–23	Bulgarian First League	34	4	1	0	4 (Note: Appearances in UEFA Conference League)	0	1 (Note: Appearance in Bulgarian Supercup)	0	40	4
Levski Sofia	2023–24	Bulgarian First League	31	7	1	0	3	1	—		35	8
Levski Sofia	2024–25	Bulgarian First League	34	9	3	0	—		—		37	9
Levski Sofia	2025–26	Bulgarian First League	17	7	0	0	8 (Note: Four appearances in UEFA Europa League, four appearances in UEFA Conference League)	0	0	0	25	7
Levski Sofia	Total		164	33	13	3	15	1	1	0	193	37
Al Taawoun	2025–26	Saudi Pro League	12	2	0	0	—		—		12	2
Career total			176	35	13	3	15	1	1	0	205	39

=== International ===
As of 16 November 2026

Appearances and goals by national team and year
National team	Year	Apps	Goals
Bulgaria	2022	4	1
Bulgaria	2023	6	1
Bulgaria	2024	2	0
Bulgaria	2025	10	1
Bulgaria	2026	9	4
Total		31	7

Scores and results list Bulgaria's goal tally first, score column indicates score after each Petkov goal.

List of international goals scored by Marin Petkov
No.	Date	Venue	Opponent	Score	Result	Competition
1.	23 September 2022	Huvepharma Arena, Razgrad, Bulgaria	Gibraltar	5–1	5–1	UEFA Nations League C
2.	17 June 2023	Darius and Girėnas Stadium, Kaunas, Lithuania	Lithuania	1–1	1–1	UEFA Euro 2024 qualifying
3.	20 March 2025	Hristo Botev Stadium, Plovdiv, Bulgaria	Republic of Ireland	1–0	1–2	UEFA Nations League promotion playoff
4.	27 March 2026	Gelora Bung Karno Stadium, Jakarta, Indonesia	Solomon Islands	1–0	10–2	2026 FIFA Series
5.	27 March 2026	Gelora Bung Karno Stadium, Jakarta, Indonesia	Solomon Islands	5–1	10–2	2026 FIFA Series
6.	30 March 2026	Gelora Bung Karno Stadium, Jakarta, Indonesia	Indonesia	1–0	1–0	2026 FIFA Series
7.	5 June 2026	Stadionul Zimbru, Chișinău, Moldova	Moldova	2–1	2–2	Friendly

== Honours ==
Levski Sofia

- Bulgarian Cup: 2021–22

Bulgaria

- FIFA Series: 2026

Individual

- FIFA Series Player of the Tournament: 2026
