= Nathan Holder =

Curaçaoan footballer (born 2002)

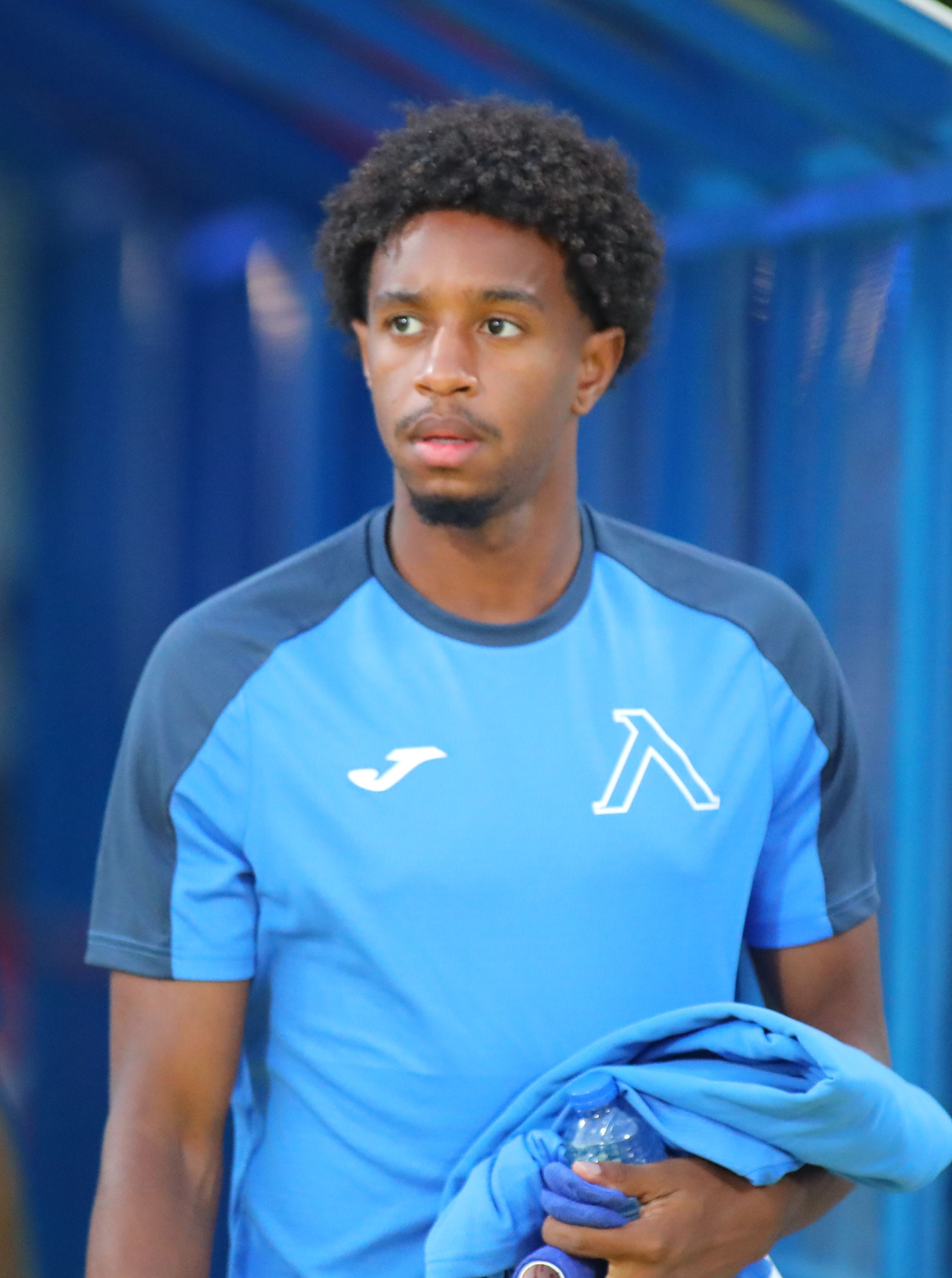
- Holder with Levski in 2022

Personal information
- Full name: Nathan Christopher Adam Holder
- Date of birth: 2 May 2002 (age 24)
- Place of birth: Amsterdam, Netherlands
- Height: 1.88 m (6 ft 2 in)
- Position: Defensive midfielder

Team information
- Current team: Lillehammer
- Number: 6

Youth career
- 2016–2018: Zeeburgia
- 2018–2021: Utrecht
- 2021–2022: Groningen

Senior career*
Years	Team	Apps	(Gls)
2022–2024	Levski Sofia	3	(0)
2022–2023	→ Spartak Varna (loan)	4	(0)
2024	→ Sportist Svoge (loan)	13	(0)
2025–	Lillehammer	50	(7)

International career^{‡}
- Curaçao U17
2020	Curaçao U20	3	(0)
2021–	Curaçao	2	(0)
- * Club domestic league appearances and goals as of 29 October 2026 ‡ National team caps and goals as of 21:32, 9 July 2022 (UTC)

Nathan Holder (born 2 May 2002) is a professional footballer who plays as a defensive midfielder for Norwegian club Lillehammer. Born in the Netherlands, he plays for the Curaçao national team.

== Club career ==
Born in Amsterdam, Holder grew up in Purmerend and started playing football at Zeeburgia, at the age of 14. He spent three further years in the youth teams of Utrecht and Groningen. On 29 June 2022, Holder moved to Bulgaria, signing a 3-year deal with First Professional League club Levski Sofia. He was initially assigned to the reserve team, Levski II, which plays in the Third League. But due to rules changes about foreigners playing in the second team, he was unable to play for them. In December 2022 he was sent on loan to Spartak Varna until end of the season.

== International career ==
While playing at Utrecht, he was called up by the Curaçao U20. Holder made his debut for the senior Curaçao national team on 6 October 2021, in a friendly match with Bahrain. He was a FC Groningen U21 player at the time.
