= Kellian van der Kaap =

Dutch footballer (born 1998)

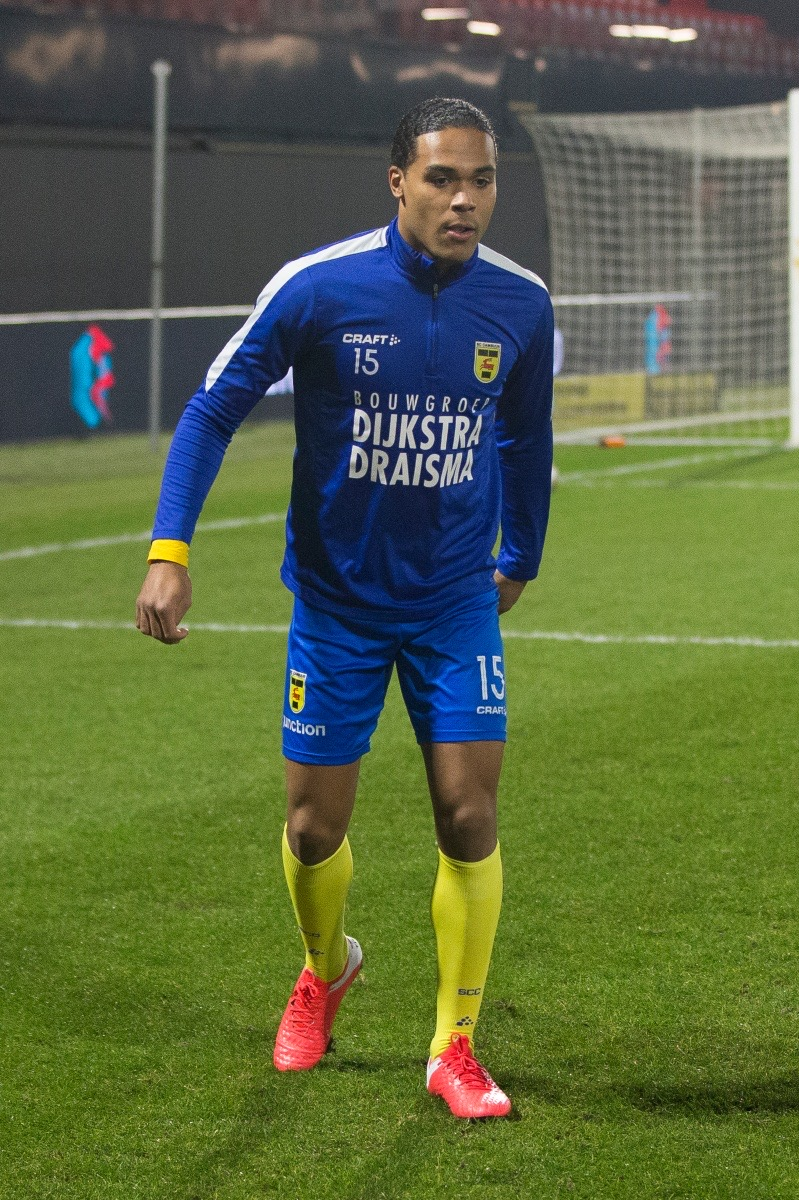
- van der Kaap warming up for Cambuur in 2020

Personal information
- Date of birth: 8 November 1998 (age 28)
- Place of birth: Groningen, Netherlands
- Height: 1.89 m (6 ft 2 1/2 in)
- Position: Centre-back

Team information
- Current team: Al-Sailiya
- Number: 55

Youth career
- –2009: SV Marum
- 2009–2010: Cambuur
- 2010–2011: Groningen
- 2011–2017: Be Quick

Senior career*
Years	Team	Apps	(Gls)
2017–2018	Harkemase Boys	29	(2)
2018–2019	Jong Groningen	31	(2)
2019–2020	Cambuur	11	(1)
2020–2021	Maccabi Netanya	26	(1)
2021	Viborg	1	(0)
2022–2025	Levski Sofia	115	(2)
2025–	Al-Sailiya	10	(0)
- * Club domestic league appearances and goals as of 19:55, 28 December 2025 (UTC)

Kellian-Key Albertus Alexander van der Kaap (born 8 November 1998) is a Dutch professional footballer who plays as a centre back for Qatar Stars League club Al-Sailiya.

== Career ==
Born in Groningen, he joined SC Cambuur in the summer of 2019. He made his debut for the club on 13 September 2019 as a substitute in a 5–1 victory at home to Helmond Sport.

He signed for Maccabi Netanya for an undisclosed fee in September 2020. On 5 August 2021, van der Kaap joined Danish Superliga club Viborg FF on a deal until June 2024. He made only two appearances for the club, before signing with Bulgarian First League club Levski Sofia on 19 January 2022.

== Honours ==
Levski Sofia

- Bulgarian Cup: 2021–22
