= Andrian Kraev =

Bulgarian footballer

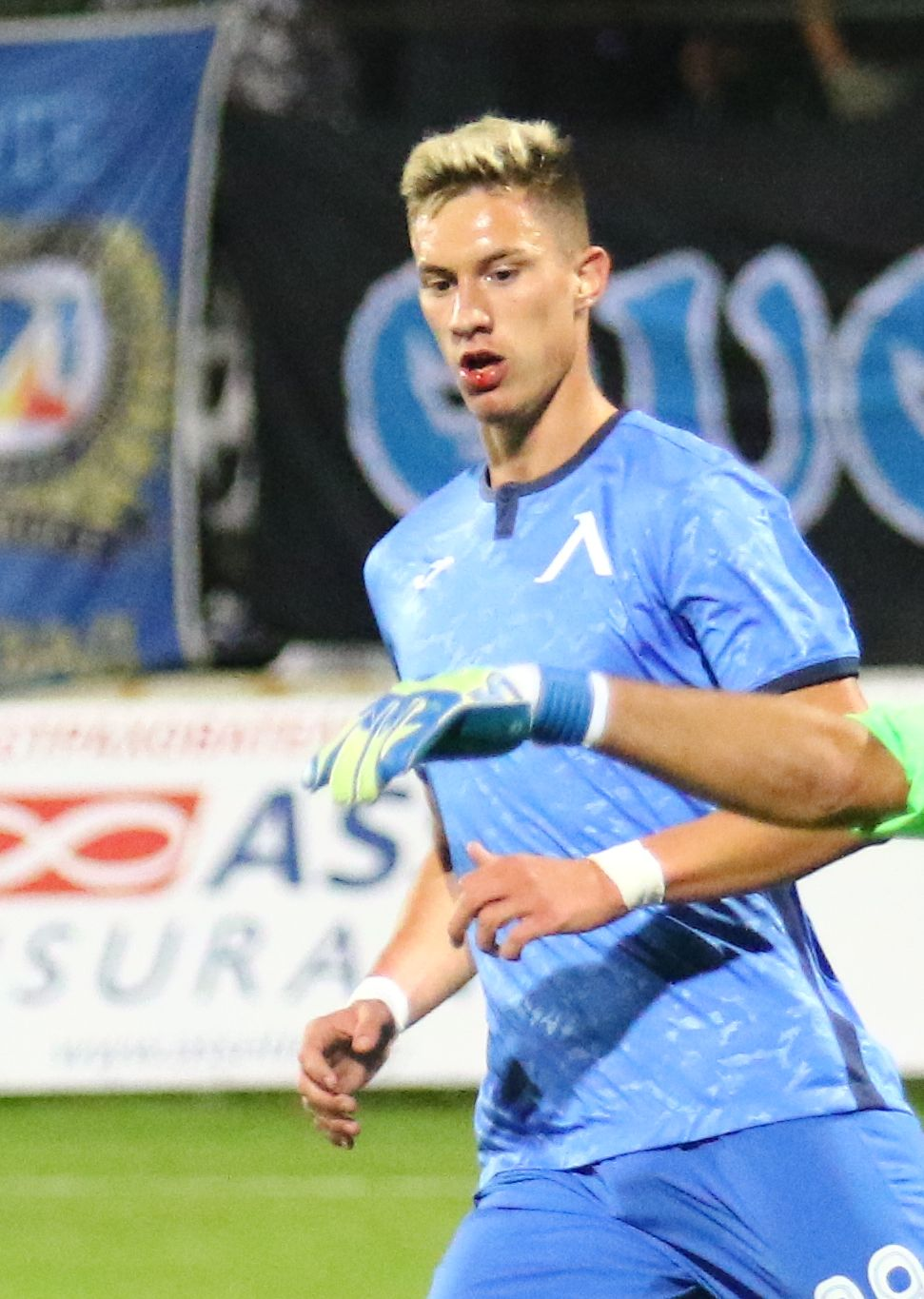
- Kraev with Levski in 2020

Personal information
- Full name: Andrian Boykov Kraev
- Date of birth: 14 February 1999 (age 27)
- Place of birth: Vratsa, Bulgaria
- Height: 1.91 m (6 ft 3 in)
- Position: Midfielder

Team information
- Current team: Hapoel Tel Aviv
- Number: 6

Youth career
- 2007–2013: Botev Vratsa
- 2013–2016: Levski Sofia
- 2016–2017: Botev Vratsa

Senior career*
Years	Team	Apps	(Gls)
2016–2017	Botev Vratsa	4	(0)
2017–2020	Hebar	52	(6)
2020–2024	Levski Sofia	89	(6)
2024–2025	Casa Pia	26	(1)
2025–	Hapoel Tel Aviv	31	(3)

International career^{‡}
2022–	Bulgaria	24	(1)
- * Club domestic league appearances and goals as of 23 June 2026 ‡ National team caps and goals as of 20:10, 16 November 2026 (UTC)

Andrian Boykov Kraev (Bulgarian: Андриан Бойков Краев; born 14 February 1999) is a Bulgarian professional footballer who plays as a midfielder for Israeli Premier League club Hapoel Tel Aviv.

== Career ==
On 21 September 2020, Kraev signed for Levski Sofia on a one-year contract. He made his debut on 3 October in a 0–0 home draw against Botev Vratsa. In October 2021, Kraev signed a new contract, keeping him with the team until the summer of 2024.

== Personal life ==
Andrian is the son of Boyko Kraev, a former professional footballer who played for Botev Vratsa, and brother of the Bulgarian international Bozhidar Kraev.

== Career statistics ==
Scores and results list Bulgaria's goal tally first.

No.	Date	Venue	Opponent	Score	Result	Competition
1.	15 November 2024	Stade de Luxembourg, Luxembourg City, Luxembourg	Luxembourg	1–0	1–0	2024–25 UEFA Nations League C

== Honours ==
Levski Sofia

- Bulgarian Cup: 2021–22
