= 2024–25 PFC Levski Sofia season =

Levski Sofia
2024–25 season
- Chairman: Nasko Sirakov
- Manager: Stanislav Genchev (until 16 December 2024); Julio Velázquez (since 5 January 2025)
- Stadium: Stadion Georgi Asparuhov
- First League: 2nd
- Bulgarian Cup: Quarter-finals
- Top goalscorer: League: Aleksandar Kolev; Marin Petkov (9); All: Aleksandar Kolev; Marin Petkov (9)
- Highest home attendance: 31,948 v. CSKA Sofia (19 October 2024)
- Lowest home attendance: 1,400 v. Dunav Ruse (14 December 2024)
- Average home league attendance: 7,425
- Biggest win: 6–1 v. Lokomotiv Sofia (A)
- Biggest defeat: 0–2 v. Beroe (H)
Home colours	Away colours	Third colours

The 2024–25 season was Levski Sofia's 104th season in the First League. This article shows player statistics and all matches (official and friendly) that the club has played during the season.

== Transfers ==
=== In ===
No.	Pos.	Nat.	Name	Age	EU	Moving from	Type	Transfer window	Ends	Transfer fee	Source
3	DF	(Brazil)	Maicon	24	Non-EU	(Brazil) Nova Iguaçu	Transfer	Summer	2027	250 000 €	
4	DF	(Venezuela)	Christian Makoun	24	EU	(Cyprus) Anorthosis Famagusta	Transfer	Summer	2027	Free	
9	FW	(Bulgaria)	Aleksandar Kolev	31	EU	(Bulgaria) Krumovgrad	Transfer	Summer	2026	Undisclosed	
12	FW	(Mali)	Mustapha Sangaré	25	EU	(Portugal) Varzim	Transfer	Summer	2027	175 000 €	
18	MF	(Slovenia)	Gašper Trdin	26	EU	(Slovenia) Bravo	Transfer	Winter	2027	Undisclosed	
21	DF	(Portugal)	Aldair Neves	24	EU	(Spain) Ponferradina	Transfer	Summer	2027	Undisclosed	
30	MF	(Nigeria)	Clement Ikenna	21	Non-EU	(Croatia) Dubrava	Transfer	Summer	2027	Undisclosed	
44	GK	(Croatia)	Matej Marković	27	EU	(Croatia) Rudeš	Transfer	Summer	2027	Free	
70	MF	(Bulgaria)	Georgi Kostadinov	34	EU	(Cyprus) APOEL	Transfer	Winter	2026	Free	
71	DF	(France)	Oliver Kamdem	22	EU	(Bulgaria) Lokomotiv Plovdiv	Transfer	Winter	2027	75 000 €	
92	GK	(Bulgaria)	Svetoslav Vutsov	22	EU	(Bulgaria) Slavia Sofia	Transfer	Winter	2027	Undisclosed	
95	FW	(Martinique)	Karl Fabien	24	EU	(Bulgaria) Slavia Sofia	Transfer	Winter	2027	Undisclosed	
	MF	(Bulgaria)	Antoan Stoyanov	19	EU	(Italy) Empoli Primavera	Loan return	Summer			
	MF	(Curaçao)	Nathan Holder	22	EU	(Bulgaria) Sportist Svoge	Loan return	Summer			
	FW	(Bulgaria)	Zdravko Dimitrov	25	EU	(Turkey) Sakaryaspor	Loan return	Summer			

=== Out ===
No.	Pos.	Nat.	Name	Age	EU	Moving to	Type	Transfer window	Transfer fee	Source
1	GK	(Bulgaria)	Plamen Andreev	19	EU	(Netherlands) Feyenoord	Transfer	Summer	1 200 000 €	
9	FW	(Brazil)	Ricardinho	23	Non-EU	(Czech Republic) Viktoria Plzeň	Transfer	Summer	1 200 000 €	
13	GK	(Bulgaria)	Nikolay Mihaylov	35	EU		Retired	Summer		
19	FW	(Morocco)	Bilal Bari	25	EU		End of contract	Summer	Free	
24	DF	(Uruguay)	Joaquín Fernández	24	EU	(Mexico) Dorados	Released	Summer	Free	
33	DF	(Panama)	José Córdoba	22	Non-EU	(England) Norwich City	Transfer	Summer	Undisclosed	
80	MF	(Bulgaria)	Andrian Kraev	24	EU	(Portugal) Casa Pia	End of contract	Summer	Free	
99	GK	(Bulgaria)	Ivan Andonov	21	EU	(Bulgaria) Slavia Sofia	Transfer	Winter	Undisclosed	
	MF	(Curaçao)	Nathan Holder	22	EU	(Norway) Lillehammer	Released	Summer	Free	
	FW	(Bulgaria)	Zdravko Dimitrov	25	EU	(Turkey) Bodrum	Transfer	Summer	200 000 €	

=== Loans out ===
No.	Pos.	Nat.	Name	Age	EU	Moving to	Type	Transfer window	Transfer fee	Source
	DF	(Bulgaria)	Patrik-Gabriel Galchev	23	EU	(Bulgaria) Lokomotiv Sofia		Winter		
	MF	(Bulgaria)	Asen Chandarov	25	EU	(Bulgaria) Septemvri Sofia		Summer		
	MF	(Bulgaria)	Borislav Rupanov	20	EU	(Bulgaria) Septemvri Sofia		Summer		
	MF	(Bulgaria)	Antoan Stoyanov	19	EU	(Bulgaria) Botev Vratsa		Summer		
	MF	(Nigeria)	Clement Ikenna	21	Non-EU	(Ukraine) Kryvbas Kryvyi Rih		Winter		
	MF	(Bulgaria)	Kristiyan Yovov	18	EU	(Bulgaria) Botev Vratsa		Winter		
	FW	(Bulgaria)	Preslav Bachev	18	EU	(Bulgaria) Botev Vratsa		Winter		

== Squad ==
Updated on 25 February 2025.

No.	Name	Nationality	Position(s)	Age	EU	Ends	Signed from	Transfer fee	Notes
Goalkeepers
13	Ognyan Vladimirov	Bulgaria	GK	18	EU	2027	Youth system	W/S	
44	Matej Marković	Croatia	GK	30	EU	2027	(Croatia) Rudeš	Undisclosed	Second nationality: Bosnia and Herzegovina
92	Svetoslav Vutsov	Bulgaria	GK	24	EU	2027	(Bulgaria) Slavia Sofia	Undisclosed	Originally from Youth system
Defenders
3	Maicon	Brazil	LB	26	Non-EU	2027	(Brazil) Nova Iguaçu	250 000 €	
4	Christian Makoun	Venezuela	CB/LB/DM	26	EU	2027	(Cyprus) Anorthosis Famagusta	Free	Second nationality: Belgium
5	Kellian van der Kaap	Netherlands	CB	28	EU	2026	(Denmark) Viborg	Free	Second nationality: Cameroon
6	Wenderson Tsunami	Brazil	LB/CB/DM	30	Non-EU	2026	(Brazil) Botafogo-PB	Free	Second nationality: Bulgaria
21	Aldair Neves	Portugal	RB	27	EU	2027	(Spain) Ponferradina	Undisclosed	
41	Viktor Lyubenov	Bulgaria	CB/LB	20	EU	2026	Youth system	W/S	
50	Kristian Dimitrov	Bulgaria	CB	29	EU	2026	(Croatia) Hajduk Split	Free	
71	Oliver Kamdem	France	RB	24	EU	2027	(Bulgaria) Lokomotiv Plovdiv	75 000 €	Second nationality: Cameroon
77	Deyvid Mihalev	Bulgaria	RB/DM	20	EU		Youth system	W/S	
Midfielders
8	Carlos Ohene	Ghana	DM	33	Non-EU	2026	(Bulgaria) Hebar	Undisclosed	
10	Asen Mitkov	Bulgaria	AM/CM	21	EU	2027	Youth system	W/S	
14	Iliyan Stefanov	Bulgaria	AM	28	EU	2025	(Bulgaria) Beroe	Free	Originally from Youth system
15	Aleksandar Bozhilov	Bulgaria	DM/LB	20	EU		Youth system	W/S	
18	Gašper Trdin	Slovenia	DM	28	EU	2027	(Slovenia) Bravo	Undisclosed	
23	Patrik Myslovič	Slovakia	AM	25	EU	2026	(Slovakia) Žilina	Free	
70	Georgi Kostadinov	Bulgaria	DM	36	EU	2026	(Cyprus) APOEL	Free	
97	Hassimi Fadiga	France	CM/LW/SS	29	EU	2025	(France) Le Mans	Free	Second nationality: Guinea
Forwards
7	Fábio Lima	Brazil	LW	29	Non-EU	2026	(Brazil) ABC	Free	
9	Aleksandar Kolev	Bulgaria	CF	33	EU	2026	(Bulgaria) Krumovgrad	Undisclosed	Originally from Youth system; second nationality: Belgium
11	Jawad El Jemili	Spain	RW/LW/AM	24	EU	2025	(Cyprus) Akritas Chlorakas	Undisclosed	Second nationality: Morocco
12	Mustapha Sangaré	Mali	CF	27	EU	2027	(Portugal) Varzim	175 000 €	Second nationality: France
17	Everton Bala	Brazil	RW/LW	27	Non-EU	2027	(Brazil) Mirassol	Loan	
88	Marin Petkov	Bulgaria	RW/CF/AM	23	EU	2027	Youth system	W/S	
95	Karl Fabien	Martinique	CF/LW/RW	26	EU	2027	(Bulgaria) Slavia Sofia	Undisclosed	Second nationality: France

== Performance overview ==
Competition	First match	Last match	Starting round	Final position	Record							
Competition	First match	Last match	Starting round	Final position	Pld	W	D	L	GF	GA	GD	Win %
First League	20 July 2024	26 May 2025	Matchday 1	2nd	36	21	9	6	64	29	+35	58.33
Bulgarian Cup	30 October 2024	26 February 2025	Round of 32	Quarter-finals	3	2	0	1	3	1	+2	66.67
Total					39	23	9	7	67	30	+37	58.97

Source: Fixtures

== Fixtures ==
Win Draw Loss Upcoming fixture

=== Friendlies ===
==== Summer ====
22 June 2024	Levski Sofia	2–0	Spartak Pleven	Pravets
19:00 UTC+3	Bachev 6'; Petkov 37'	Report		Stadium: Gradski; Referee: Ivo Andreev (Sofia)

29 June 2024	Levski Sofia	5–0	Septemvri Sofia	Sofia
18:30 UTC+3	Fadiga 9'; Maicon 15'; Petkov 45+3'; Bachev 52'; Everton 58'	Report		Stadium: Georgi Asparuhov; Referee: Volen Chinkov (Sofia)

3 July 2024	Levski Sofia	0–0	Cherno More	Pravets
18:00 UTC+3		Report		Stadium: Gradski; Referee: Dimitar Dimitrov (Pernik)

6 July 2024	Levski Sofia	0–0	Arda	Sofia
19:30 UTC+3		Report		Stadium: Georgi Asparuhov; Referee: Dimitar Burov (Sofia)

13 July 2024	Levski Sofia (Bulgaria)	2–2	(Israel) Maccabi Netanya	Sofia
19:00 UTC+3	Petkov 61'; Tsunami 62'	Report	Zlatanović 39', 53'	Stadium: Georgi Asparuhov; Referee: Mariyan Grebencharski (Samokov)

==== Mid-season ====
7 September 2024	Levski Sofia	3–2	Botev Vratsa	Sofia
18:00 UTC+3	Everton 7'; Sangaré 20' van der Kaap 71'	Report	Vasilev 66'; Genov 73'	Stadium: Georgi Asparuhov; Referee: Gero Piskov (Sofia)

11 October 2024	Levski Sofia	4–0	Hebar	Sofia
15:45 UTC+3	Sangaré 28'; Ikenna 45'; Stefanov 72', 84'	Report		Stadium: Georgi Asparuhov; Referee: Lyuboslav Lyubomirov (Pernik)

==== Winter ====
15 January 2025	Levski Sofia (Bulgaria)	0–4	(Serbia) Red Star Belgrade	Belek, Turkey
17:00 UTC+3		Report	Silas 19'; Ndiaye 48'; Kanga 70' (pen.); Maksimović 84'	Stadium: Calista Sports Center

18 January 2025	Levski Sofia (Bulgaria)	3–4	(Czech Republic) Baník Ostrava	Belek, Turkey
17:00 UTC+3	Sangaré 62', 88'; Fábio Lima 86'	Report	Prekop 8', 57'; Buchta 71'; Munksgaard 76'	Stadium: Kaya Palazzo Sports Complex

23 January 2025	Levski Sofia (Bulgaria)	1–2	(Poland) Zagłębie Lubin	Belek, Turkey
17:00 UTC+3	Fábio Lima 76'	Report	Mróz 33'; Kolan 61'	Stadium: Kaya Palazzo Sports Complex

27 January 2025	Levski Sofia	2–1	Dobrudzha	Belek, Turkey
17:00 UTC+3	Kolev 41'; Sangaré 84'	Report	Karakashev 29'	Stadium: Kaya Palazzo Sports Complex

2 February 2025	Levski Sofia	3–0	Sportist Svoge	Sofia
15:00 UTC+2	Petkov 16', 61'; Sangaré 22'	Report		Stadium: Georgi Asparuhov; Referee: Stanimir Trenchev (Sofia)

=== First League ===
==== Preliminary stage ====
===== League table =====
Pos	Team	Pld	W	D	L	GF	GA	GD	Pts	Qualification
1	Ludogorets Razgrad	30	24	4	2	62	14	+48	76	Qualification for the Championship group
2	Levski Sofia	30	19	5	6	55	25	+30	62	Qualification for the Championship group
3	Arda	30	15	8	7	49	33	+16	53 (Note: Head-to-head points: Arda 4; Cherno More 1.)	Qualification for the Championship group
4	Cherno More	30	14	11	5	41	25	+16	53	Qualification for the Championship group
5	Botev Plovdiv	30	14	7	9	32	31	+1	49	Qualification for the Conference League group

Source: soccerway, Bulgarian Football
Rules for classification: 1) Points; 2) Head-to-head points; 3) Head-to-head goal difference; 4) Head-to-head goals scored; 5) Head-to-head away goals scored (only if two teams); 6) Goal difference; 7) Goals scored; 8) Fairplay ranking; 9) Draw

===== Results summary =====
Overall								Home						Away					
Pld	W	D	L	GF	GA	GD	Pts	W	D	L	GF	GA	GD	W	D	L	GF	GA	GD
30	19	5	6	55	25	+30	62	10	2	3	28	14	+14	9	3	3	27	11	+16

Source: bulgarian-football.com

===== Results by round =====
Round	1	2	3	4	5	6	7	8	9	10	11	12	13	14	15	16	17	18	19	20	21	22	23	24	25	26	27	28	29	30
Ground	A	H	A	H	A	H	A	H	A	H	A	A	H	A	H	H	A	H	A	H	A	H	A	H	A	H	H	A	H	A
Result	W	W	W	W	L	W	D	W	W	W	L	W	L	L	L	W	W	W	W	W	W	W	D	D	D	D	W	W	L	W
Position	1	1	1	1	1	1	1	1	2	2	2	2	3	3	4	4	4	4	4	2	2	2	2	2	2	2	2	2	2	2

Source: See Results
A = Away; H = Home; W = Win; D = Draw; L = Loss

===== Matches =====
The league fixtures were announced on 13 June 2024.

20 July 2024 1	Lokomotiv Sofia	1–6	Levski Sofia	Sofia
21:15 UTC+3	Aralica 5'; Stanoev (yellow card) 90+4'	Report	Kolev 12'; Aldair 21'; Tsunami (yellow card) 34'; El Jemili 45+1', 45+3'; Dimitrov (yellow card) 62'; Ohene 90+1'; Sangaré 90+7'	Stadium: Lokomotiv; Attendance: 4,300; Referee: Radoslav Gidzhenov (Plovdiv); Man of the Match: Aleksandar Kolev

26 July 2024 2	Levski Sofia	4–0	Botev Vratsa	Sofia
21:15 UTC+3	Everton 41'; Maicon (yellow card) 58'; Fadiga 66', 90'; El Jemili 79', (yellow card) 80'	Report	Georgiev (yellow card) 17'; Kondrakov (yellow card) 58'	Stadium: Georgi Asparuhov; Attendance: 10,500; Referee: Kristiyan Kolev (Plovdiv); Man of the Match: Hassimi Fadiga

2 August 2024 3	Lokomotiv Plovdiv	0–2	Levski Sofia	Plovdiv
21:15 UTC+3	Paskalev (yellow card) 41'; Segura (yellow card) 52'; Ali (yellow card) 70'	Report	Fadiga 9'; Sangaré 85'; Myslovič (yellow card) 88'	Stadium: Lokomotiv; Attendance: 5,300; Referee: Nikola Popov (Sofia); Man of the Match: Jawad El Jemili

10 August 2024 4	Levski Sofia	3–0	Krumovgrad	Sofia
21:15 UTC+3	Kolev 10', 90+3'; Sangaré 59'	Report	Šimić (yellow card) 80'; Ali (yellow card) 90+1'; Santana (yellow card) 90+1'	Stadium: Georgi Asparuhov; Attendance: 12,000; Referee: Volen Chinkov (Sofia); Man of the Match: Mustapha Sangaré

17 August 2024 5	Ludogorets Razgrad	1–0	Levski Sofia	Razgrad
21:15 UTC+3	Ikenna 85' (o.g.); Delev (yellow card) 90'	Report	Ohene (yellow card) 61'; Ikenna (yellow card) 69'	Stadium: Huvepharma Arena; Attendance: 8,831; Referee: Georgi Kabakov (Plovdiv); Man of the Match: Caio Vidal

23 August 2024 6	Levski Sofia	1–0	Hebar	Sofia
21:15 UTC+3	Dimitrov 3'	Report	Nikolaev (yellow card) 60'; Gamakov (yellow card) 66'; Debarliev (yellow card) 73'; Terziev (yellow card) 83'	Stadium: Georgi Asparuhov; Attendance: 9,000; Referee: Dimitar Dimitrov (Sofia); Man of the Match: Kristian Dimitrov

31 August 2024 7	Spartak Varna	0–0	Levski Sofia	Varna
19:00 UTC+3	Granchov (yellow card) 28'; Baurenski (yellow card) 51'; Vutov (yellow card) 53'; Jurić-Petrašilo (yellow card) 90+5'	Report	Tsunami (yellow card) 8'; Ohene (yellow card) 33'; Fadiga (yellow card) 61'	Stadium: Spartak; Attendance: 4,000; Referee: Georgi Davidov (Veliko Tarnovo); Man of the Match: Martin Velichkov

15 September 2024 12	CSKA 1948	2–4	Levski Sofia	Bistritsa
19:15 UTC+3	Kirilov 39'; Karagaren (yellow card) 45'; Ilievski 90'	Report	Sangaré 16', 26'; Ohene (yellow card) 40'; Kolev 58'; Petkov 77'	Stadium: Bistritsa; Attendance: 550; Referee: Valentin Zhelezov (Burgas); Man of the Match: Aleksandar Kolev
Note: Originally scheduled for mid-October, the game was moved forward to mid-September, as the BFU swapped matchdays 8 and 12 in relation to the stadium issue with the Eternal derby, which respectively was pushed back from mid-September to mid-October.

22 September 2024 9	Slavia Sofia	0–1	Levski Sofia	Sofia
17:30 UTC+3		Report	Dimitrov 45+5', (yellow card) 81'; Sangaré (yellow card) 66'; Makoun (yellow card) 78'; Kolev (yellow card) 90+4'	Stadium: Aleksandar Shalamanov; Attendance: 6,344; Referee: Radoslav Gidzhenov (Plovdiv); Man of the Match: Everton Bala

29 September 2024 10	Levski Sofia	2–1	Arda	Sofia
18:45 UTC+3	Kolev 12' (pen.); Tsunami (yellow card) 31'; Makoun 72'	Report	Eboa Eboa (yellow card) 6'; Tsonev (yellow card) 23'; Krachunov (yellow card) 30'; S. Ivanov 39'	Stadium: Georgi Asparuhov; Attendance: 5,000; Referee: Vladimir Valkov (Plovdiv); Man of the Match: Christian Makoun

5 October 2024 11	Botev Plovdiv	1–0	Levski Sofia	Plovdiv
20:00 UTC+3	Ukaki (yellow card) 15'; Tamm (red card) 63'; Popov (yellow card) 69'; Balogiannis (yellow card) 82'; Triboulet 87'	Report	Maicon (yellow card) 46'	Stadium: Hristo Botev; Attendance: 12,236; Referee: Nikola Popov (Sofia); Man of the Match: Ivelin Popov

19 October 2024 8	Levski Sofia	1–0	CSKA Sofia	Sofia
15:45 UTC+3	Sangaré (yellow card) 45+7'; Makoun 86', (yellow card) 88'; Kolev (yellow card) 89'	Report	Dellova (yellow card) 54'; Lindseth (yellow card) 61'; Pinto (yellow card) 80'; Turitsov (yellow card) 84'; Carreazo (yellow card) 90+1'; Busatto (yellow card) FT	Stadium: Vasil Levski National Stadium; Attendance: 31,948; Referee: Dragomir Draganov (Varna); Man of the Match: Christian Makoun
Note: The game was originally scheduled for mid-September at the Vasil Levski National Stadium. Due to the stadium's unavailability at that time, initially, the BFU moved the game to Levski's home venue, the Georgi Asparuhov Stadium, to be played without the presence of away fans. However, following CSKA's appeal, the BFU made the final decision to swap matchdays 8 and 12 in order to allow the game to be played at the national stadium with both sets of fans present, and therefore it was pushed back to mid-October.

25 October 2024 13	Levski Sofia	0–2	Beroe	Sofia
19:00 UTC+3		Report	Pineda 63'; Arthur Motta (yellow card) 77'; Godoy 83', (yellow card) 85'; Sarriegi (yellow card) 90+2'	Stadium: Georgi Asparuhov; Attendance: 6,000; Referee: Mariyan Grebencharski (Samokov); Man of the Match: Arthur Motta

3 November 2024 14	Cherno More	2–1	Levski Sofia	Varna
17:30 UTC+2	Drobarov (yellow card) 17'; Dudu 26'; Weslen 44' (pen.); Dimov (yellow card) 45+3'; Donchev (yellow card) 45+4'	Report	Aldair (yellow card) 4'; Fábio Lima (yellow card) 45+4'; Dimitrov 61'	Stadium: Ticha; Attendance: 5,864; Referee: Valentin Zhelezov (Burgas); Man of the Match: Vasil Panayotov

9 November 2024 15	Levski Sofia	2–3	Septemvri Sofia	Sofia
17:30 UTC+2	Petkov 4'; Aldair (yellow card) 30'; Ohene (yellow card) 56'; Dimitrov 66'	Report	Polendakov (yellow card) 22'; Rupanov 41', 71'; Chandarov 45+2'; Sheytanov (yellow card) 90+4'	Stadium: Georgi Asparuhov; Attendance: 4,600; Referee: Dragomir Draganov (Varna); Man of the Match: Borislav Rupanov

23 November 2024 16	Levski Sofia	2–0	Lokomotiv Sofia	Sofia
17:30 UTC+2	Petkov (penalty missed) 18', 18'; Dimitrov 38'	Report	Stanoev (yellow card) 45'; Lambese (yellow card) 60'; Ivanov (yellow card) 66'	Stadium: Georgi Asparuhov; Attendance: 2,500; Referee: Krasen Georgiev (Varna); Man of the Match: Marin Petkov

30 November 2024 17	Botev Vratsa	0–2	Levski Sofia	Vratsa
15:00 UTC+2	Lozev (yellow card) 43'; Georgiev (yellow card) 48'	Report	Mitkov (yellow card) 9'; Marković (yellow card) 39'; Stefanov 85'; Everton 90'	Stadium: Hristo Botev; Attendance: 2,466; Referee: Kristiyan Kolev (Plovdiv); Man of the Match: Iliyan Stefanov

4 December 2024 18	Levski Sofia	2–1	Lokomotiv Plovdiv	Sofia
17:30 UTC+2	Kolev 9' (pen.); Ohene (yellow card) 65'; Myslovič 71'	Report	Pavlov (yellow card) 6'; Perea (yellow card) 37'; Iliev 68' (pen.), (yellow card) 75'; H. Ivanov (yellow card) 77'; Lyaskov (yellow card) 79'	Stadium: Georgi Asparuhov; Attendance: 2,900; Referee: Georgi Ginchev (Veliko Tarnovo); Man of the Match: Patrik Myslovič

8 December 2024 19	Krumovgrad	0–2	Levski Sofia	Plovdiv (Note: Krumovgrad host their matches at Nikola Shterev - Starika Sports Complex, Plovdiv, as their own venue, Krumovgrad Stadium, Krumovgrad, does not meet BFU requirements.)
14:30 UTC+2		Report	Kolev 1'; Petkov 23'	Stadium: Nikola Shterev - Starika Sports Complex; Attendance: 800; Referee: Dragomir Draganov (Varna); Man of the Match: Aleksandar Kolev

9 February 2025 20	Levski Sofia	2–1	Ludogorets Razgrad	Sofia
17:15 UTC+2	El Jemili 34'; Marković (yellow card) 60'; Everton 62'; Myslovič (yellow card) 68'; Mitkov (yellow card) 90+1'; Maicon (yellow card) 90+7'	Report	Kurtulus (yellow card) 29'; Verdon 90+3' (pen.)	Stadium: Georgi Asparuhov; Attendance: 9,500; Referee: Radoslav Gidzhenov (Plovdiv); Man of the Match: Jawad El Jemili

15 February 2025 21	Hebar	1–4	Levski Sofia	Pazardzhik
17:30 UTC+2	Petrović (yellow card) 26'; Makni 81' (pen.), (yellow card) 90+1'; Zebić (yellow card) 85'	Report	Everton 12', 21', (yellow card) 80'; Petkov 58'; El Jemili 60'	Stadium: Georgi Benkovski; Attendance: 5,245; Referee: Dimitar Dimitrov (Sofia); Man of the Match: Everton Bala

21 February 2025 22	Levski Sofia	2–0	Spartak Varna	Sofia
17:45 UTC+2	Petkov 17'; Makoun (yellow card) 66'; Fábio Lima 90+4'	Report	Strauß (yellow card) 49'; Granchov (yellow card) 82'; Baurenski (yellow card) 83' (yellow-red card) 84'	Stadium: Georgi Asparuhov; Attendance: 2,300; Referee: Volen Chinkov (Sofia); Man of the Match: Marin Petkov

2 March 2025 23	CSKA Sofia	2–2	Levski Sofia	Sofia
14:00 UTC+2	Pittas 40'; Eto'o (yellow card) 51', (red card) 90+10'; Iliev Jr. (yellow card) 51'; Shopov (yellow card) 54'; Carreazo (yellow card) 61'; Panayotov 84'; Skarsem (yellow card) 90+1'; Pinto (yellow card) 90+9'; Dyulgerov (yellow card) 90+9'	Report	El Jemili (yellow card) 62'; Aldair (yellow card) 86', (goal) 90+13'; Stefanov 90+5'; Everton (yellow card) 90+9'; Fábio Lima (red card) 90+10'	Stadium: Vasil Levski National Stadium; Attendance: 23,345; Referee: Radoslav Gidzhenov (Plovdiv); Man of the Match: Iliyan Stefanov

9 March 2025 24	Levski Sofia	3–3	Slavia Sofia	Sofia
14:30 UTC+2	Everton 2'; Sangaré (yellow card) 17'; Trdin (yellow card) 36' van der Kaap (yellow card) 50'; El Jemili (yellow card) 56'; Makoun (yellow card) 77'; Fadiga 90+4'; Aldair 90+7'	Report	Martinov 7'; Raychev 14'; Georgiev (red card) 33'; Tombak (yellow card) 41'; Nikolov (yellow card) 52'; Stoyanov (yellow card) 61'; Aleksandrov (yellow card) 63'; Stoev (yellow card) 80'; Semedo 84'	Stadium: Georgi Asparuhov; Attendance: 11,000; Referee: Kristiyan Kolev (Plovdiv); Man of the Match: Aldair Neves

16 March 2025 25	Arda	1–1	Levski Sofia	Kardzhali
17:00 UTC+2	Velkovski (yellow card) 41'; Yordanov (penalty missed) 52'; Velyev (yellow card) 64'; S. Ivanov 82'; Krachunov (yellow card) 90+5'	Report	Myslovič (yellow card) 19'; Petkov 22' van der Kaap (yellow card) 40'; El Jemili (yellow card) 53' (yellow-red card) 71'	Stadium: Arena Arda; Attendance: 1,800; Referee: Mariyan Grebencharski (Samokov); Man of the Match: Stanislav Ivanov

30 March 2025 26	Levski Sofia	1–1	Botev Plovdiv	Sofia
18:30 UTC+3	Kolev 51', (yellow card) 52' van der Kaap (yellow card) 72'; Ohene (yellow card) 78'	Report	Ukaki (yellow card) 31', (goal) 53'; Minkov (yellow card) 36'; Chernev (yellow card) 66'; Bernat (yellow card) 74'; Yordanov (yellow card) 79'; Batigi (yellow card) 90+2'	Stadium: Georgi Asparuhov; Attendance: 7,200; Referee: Dimitar Dimitrov (Sofia); Man of the Match: Ehije Ukaki

3 April 2025 27	Levski Sofia	2–0	CSKA 1948	Sofia
19:30 UTC+3	Petkov 9', (yellow card) 61'; Kolev 23', (penalty missed) 36'; Makoun (yellow card) 74'	Report	Kirilov (penalty missed) 87'	Stadium: Georgi Asparuhov; Attendance: 5,500; Referee: Stanimir Trenchev (Sofia); Man of the Match: Svetoslav Vutsov

6 April 2025 28	Beroe	0–1	Levski Sofia	Stara Zagora
17:15 UTC+3	Salido (yellow card) 25'; Pachamé (yellow card) 67'	Report	Kostadinov (yellow card) 35'; Sangaré 73', (yellow card) 74'; Vutsov (yellow card) 90+4'	Stadium: Beroe; Attendance: 3,000; Referee: Vladimir Valkov (Plovdiv); Man of the Match: Georgi Kostadinov

13 April 2025 29	Levski Sofia	1–2	Cherno More	Sofia
17:30 UTC+3	van der Kaap 11', (yellow card) 73'; Kostadinov (yellow card) 90+4'	Report	Tonev 79', 81'; Osei (yellow card) 87'; Barry (yellow card) 90+7'	Stadium: Georgi Asparuhov; Attendance: 10,300; Referee: Georgi Davidov (Veliko Tarnovo); Man of the Match: Dimitar Tonev

21 April 2025 30	Septemvri Sofia	0–1	Levski Sofia	Sofia
16:30 UTC+3	Rupanov (yellow card) 43'; Hristov (yellow card) 87'	Report	Aldair (yellow card) 17'; Ohene (yellow card) 24'; Sangaré 83'	Stadium: Lokomotiv (Note: Septemvri host their matches at Stadion Lokomotiv, Sofia, as their own venue, Stadion Dragalevtsi, Sofia, does not meet BFU requirements.); Attendance: 3,388; Referee: Ventsislav Mitrev (Sofia); Man of the Match: Mustapha Sangaré

==== Championship round ====
===== League table =====
Pos	Team	Pld	W	D	L	GF	GA	GD	Pts	Qualification
1	Ludogorets Razgrad (C)	36	25	8	3	70	22	+48	83	Qualification for the Champions League first qualifying round
2	Levski Sofia	36	21	9	6	64	29	+35	72	Qualification for the Europa League first qualifying round (Note: As Ludogorets Razgrad won the 2024–25 Bulgarian Cup, the cup's Europa League first qualifying round berth was passed to the second-placed team in the First League.)
3	Cherno More	36	15	14	7	44	30	+14	59	Qualification for the Conference League second qualifying round
4	Arda (O)	36	15	13	8	54	41	+13	58	Qualification for the Conference League play-off

Source: soccerway, Bulgarian Football
Rules for classification: 1) Points; 2) Head-to-head points; 3) Head-to-head goal difference; 4) Head-to-head goals scored; 5) Head-to-head away goals scored (only if two teams); 6) Goal difference; 7) Goals scored; 8) Fairplay ranking; 9) Draw
(C) Champions; (O) Play-off winners

===== Results summary =====
Overall								Home						Away					
Pld	W	D	L	GF	GA	GD	Pts	W	D	L	GF	GA	GD	W	D	L	GF	GA	GD
6	2	4	0	9	4	+5	10	1	2	0	5	3	+2	1	2	0	4	1	+3

Source: See results

===== Results by round =====
Round	1	2	3	4	5	6
Ground	H	A	H	A	H	A
Result	D	D	W	W	D	D
Position	2	2	2	2	2	2

Source: See Results
A = Away; H = Home; W = Win; D = Draw; L = Loss

===== Matches =====
26 April 2025 31	Levski Sofia	1–1	Arda	Sofia
20:00 UTC+3	Petkov 45+1'; El Jemili (yellow card) 90+4'	Report	Idowu (yellow card) 65'; Yordanov 69'; Statev (yellow card) 90+6'	Stadium: Georgi Asparuhov; Attendance: 5,400; Referee: Volen Chinkov (Sofia); Man of the Match: Marin Petkov

3 May 2025 32	Ludogorets Razgrad	1–1	Levski Sofia	Razgrad
19:30 UTC+3	Erick Marcus 34'; Kurtulus (yellow card) 77'	Report	Ohene (yellow card) 45'; Everton 79'	Stadium: Huvepharma Arena; Attendance: 4,677; Referee: Dragomir Draganov (Varna); Man of the Match: Everton Bala

10 May 2025 33	Levski Sofia	2–0	Cherno More	Sofia
20:00 UTC+3	Kostadinov 33'; Ohene (yellow card) 37'; Everton (yellow card) 43'; Maicon (yellow card) 70'; Tsunami (yellow card) 75'; Kamdem (yellow card) 88'; Vutsov (yellow card) 90+2'; Mitkov 90+2'	Report	Soula (yellow card) 9'; Beyhan (yellow card) 22'; Dani Martín (yellow card) 25'; Donchev (yellow card) 41'	Stadium: Georgi Asparuhov; Attendance: 4,700; Referee: Nikola Popov (Sofia); Man of the Match: Maicon

14 May 2025 34	Arda	0–3	Levski Sofia	Kardzhali
20:15 UTC+3	Tilev (yellow card) 22'	Report	Myslovič 6'; Stefanov 16'; Makoun 37'; Trdin (yellow card) 67'	Stadium: Arena Arda; Attendance: 1,592; Referee: Valentin Zhelezov (Burgas); Man of the Match: Christian Makoun

17 May 2025 35	Levski Sofia	2–2	Ludogorets Razgrad	Sofia
20:00 UTC+3	Mitkov (yellow card) 40'; Sangaré (yellow card) 45+1'; Kamdem 61', (yellow card) 62'; El Jemili 68' van der Kaap (yellow card) 70'; Maicon (yellow card) 84'; Kostadinov (yellow card) 90+3'	Report	Bile 36', (yellow card) 36'; Piotrowski (red card) 39'; Chochev 77'	Stadium: Georgi Asparuhov; Attendance: 6,000; Referee: Volen Chinkov (Sofia); Man of the Match: Ivaylo Chochev

26 May 2025 36	Cherno More	0–0	Levski Sofia	Varna
17:45 UTC+3	Weslen (yellow card) 6'	Report	Stefanov (yellow card) 15'; Makoun (yellow card) 70'; Aldair (yellow card) 77'	Stadium: Ticha; Attendance: 3,133; Referee: Radoslav Gidzhenov (Plovdiv); Man of the Match: Plamen Iliev

=== Bulgarian Cup ===
30 October 2024 Round of 32	Pirin Blagoevgrad	0–2 (a.e.t.)	Levski Sofia	Blagoevgrad
17:00 UTC+2	Boyanov (yellow card) 74'; Botnari (yellow card) 84'	Report	Bachev 97'; Sangaré 103'	Stadium: Hristo Botev; Attendance: 4,500; Referee: Vasil Minev (Sofia)

14 December 2024 Round of 16	Levski Sofia	1–0	Dunav Ruse	Sofia
16:00 UTC+2	Fábio Lima (yellow card) 26'; Tsunami 77'; Petkov (penalty missed) 90+5'	Report	Hasan (yellow card) 90+3'	Stadium: Georgi Asparuhov; Attendance: 1,400; Referee: Lyuboslav Lyubomirov (Pernik)

26 February 2025 Quarterfinal	Cherno More	1–0	Levski Sofia	Varna
15:00 UTC+2	Atanasov (yellow card) 55'; Popov (yellow card) 75'; Tonev 87'; Iliev (yellow card) 90+6'	Report	Sangaré (yellow card) 29'; Kostadinov (yellow card) 33'; Petkov (yellow card) 50'; Ohene (red card) 68'; Maicon (yellow card) 85'	Stadium: Ticha; Attendance: 3,200; Referee: Georgi Ginchev (Veliko Tarnovo)

== Squad statistics ==
=== Appearances and goals ===
No.	Pos	Nat	Player	Total		First League		Bulgarian Cup	
No.	Pos	Nat	Player	Apps	Goals	Apps	Goals	Apps	Goals
3	DF	(Brazil) BRA	Maicon	32	0	30	0	1+1	0
4	DF	(Venezuela) VEN	Christian Makoun	29	3	23+3	3	3	0
5	DF	(Netherlands) NED	Kellian van der Kaap	32	1	29	1	3	0
6	DF	(Brazil) BRA	Wenderson Tsunami	33	1	28+2	0	1+2	1
7	FW	(Brazil) BRA	Fábio Lima	22	1	9+11	1	1+1	0
8	MF	(Ghana) GHA	Carlos Ohene	32	1	22+8	1	1+1	0
9	FW	(Bulgaria) BUL	Aleksandar Kolev	30	9	25+4	9	1	0
10	MF	(Bulgaria) BUL	Asen Mitkov	20	1	7+13	1	0	0
11	FW	(Spain) ESP	Jawad El Jemili	31	6	20+9	6	2	0
12	FW	(Mali) MLI	Mustapha Sangaré	37	8	20+14	7	2+1	1
13	GK	(Bulgaria) BUL	Ognyan Vladimirov	0	0	0	0	0	0
14	MF	(Bulgaria) BUL	Iliyan Stefanov	16	3	4+10	3	0+2	0
15	MF	(Bulgaria) BUL	Aleksandar Bozhilov	0	0	0	0	0	0
17	FW	(Brazil) BRA	Everton Bala	39	7	28+8	7	2+1	0
18	MF	(Slovenia) SLO	Gašper Trdin	9	0	3+5	0	1	0
21	DF	(Portugal) POR	Aldair Neves	36	3	32+3	3	1	0
23	MF	(Slovakia) SVK	Patrik Myslovič	23	2	10+10	2	2+1	0
41	DF	(Bulgaria) BUL	Viktor Lyubenov	0	0	0	0	0	0
44	GK	(Croatia) CRO	Matej Marković	23	0	20	0	3	0
50	DF	(Bulgaria) BUL	Kristian Dimitrov	29	5	26+1	5	2	0
70	MF	(Bulgaria) BUL	Georgi Kostadinov	12	1	8+3	1	1	0
71	DF	(France) FRA	Oliver Kamdem	8	1	3+4	1	1	0
77	DF	(Bulgaria) BUL	Deyvid Mihalev	0	0	0	0	0	0
88	FW	(Bulgaria) BUL	Marin Petkov	37	9	25+9	9	2+1	0
92	GK	(Bulgaria) BUL	Svetoslav Vutsov	11	0	11	0	0	0
95	FW	(Martinique) MTQ	Karl Fabien	6	0	0+5	0	0+1	0
97	MF	(France) FRA	Hassimi Fadiga	17	4	4+11	4	0+2	0
Players away on loan:
	DF	(Bulgaria) BUL	Patrik-Gabriel Galchev	10	0	1+8	0	1	0
	MF	(Nigeria) NGR	Clement Ikenna	13	0	2+9	0	2	0
	MF	(Bulgaria) BUL	Borislav Rupanov	1	0	0+1	0	0	0
	MF	(Bulgaria) BUL	Asen Chandarov	0	0	0	0	0	0
	MF	(Bulgaria) BUL	Antoan Stoyanov	0	0	0	0	0	0
	MF	(Bulgaria) BUL	Kristiyan Yovov	0	0	0	0	0	0
	FW	(Bulgaria) BUL	Preslav Bachev	11	1	1+8	0	1+1	1
Players who left during the season:
	GK	(Bulgaria) BUL	Plamen Andreev	5	0	5	0	0	0
	GK	(Bulgaria) BUL	Ivan Andonov	0	0	0	0	0	0
	MF	(Curaçao) CUW	Nathan Holder	0	0	0	0	0	0

=== Goalscorers ===
Rank	Player	FPL	BC	Total
1	(Bulgaria) Aleksandar Kolev	9	0	9
1	(Bulgaria) Marin Petkov	9	0	9
3	(Mali) Mustapha Sangaré	7	1	8
4	(Brazil) Everton Bala	7	0	7
5	(Spain) Jawad El Jemili	6	0	6
6	(Bulgaria) Kristian Dimitrov	5	0	5
7	(France) Hassimi Fadiga	4	0	4
8	(Venezuela) Christian Makoun	3	0	3
8	(Portugal) Aldair Neves	3	0	3
8	(Bulgaria) Iliyan Stefanov	3	0	3
11	(Slovakia) Patrik Myslovič	2	0	2
12	(France) Oliver Kamdem	1	0	1
12	(Bulgaria) Georgi Kostadinov	1	0	1
12	(Brazil) Fábio Lima	1	0	1
12	(Bulgaria) Asen Mitkov	1	0	1
12	(Ghana) Carlos Ohene	1	0	1
12	(Netherlands) Kellian van der Kaap	1	0	1
12	(Bulgaria) Preslav Bachev	0	1	1
12	(Brazil) Wenderson Tsunami	0	1	1
Total		64	3	67

=== Clean sheets ===
Rank	Goalkeeper	FPL	BC	Total
1	(Croatia) Matej Marković	7	2	9
2	(Bulgaria) Svetoslav Vutsov	6	0	6
3	(Bulgaria) Plamen Andreev	4	0	4
Total		17	2	19

=== Disciplinary record ===
Includes all competitive matches.

N	P	Nat.	Name	First League			Bulgarian Cup			Total			Notes
N	P	Nat.	Name	Yellow card	Second yellow card	Red card	Yellow card	Second yellow card	Red card	Yellow card	Second yellow card	Red card	Notes
3	DF	(Brazil)	Maicon	5			1			6			
4	DF	(Venezuela)	Christian Makoun	6						6			
5	DF	(Netherlands)	Kellian van der Kaap	5						5			
6	DF	(Brazil)	Wenderson Tsunami	4						4			
7	FW	(Brazil)	Fábio Lima	1		1	1			2		1	
8	MF	(Ghana)	Carlos Ohene	9					1	9		1	
9	FW	(Bulgaria)	Aleksandar Kolev	3						3			
10	MF	(Bulgaria)	Asen Mitkov	3						3			
11	FW	(Spain)	Jawad El Jemili	4	1					4	1		
12	FW	(Mali)	Mustapha Sangaré	5			1			6			
14	MF	(Bulgaria)	Iliyan Stefanov	1						1			
17	FW	(Brazil)	Everton Bala	3						3			
18	MF	(Slovenia)	Gašper Trdin	2						2			
21	DF	(Portugal)	Aldair Neves	5						5			
23	MF	(Slovakia)	Patrik Myslovič	3						3			
44	GK	(Croatia)	Matej Marković	2						2			
50	DF	(Bulgaria)	Kristian Dimitrov	2						2			
70	MF	(Bulgaria)	Georgi Kostadinov	3			1			4			
71	DF	(France)	Oliver Kamdem	2						2			
88	FW	(Bulgaria)	Marin Petkov	1			1			2			
92	GK	(Bulgaria)	Svetoslav Vutsov	2						2			
97	MF	(France)	Hassimi Fadiga	1						1			
	MF	(Nigeria)	Clement Ikenna^{†}	1						1			

Source: Soccerway
Only competitive matches
(yellow card) = Number of bookings; (second yellow card) = Number of sending offs after a second yellow card; (red card) = Number of sending offs by a direct red card. ^{†} Player left the club during the season.
