= 2023–24 PFC Levski Sofia season =

Levski Sofia
2023–24 season
- Chairman: Nasko Sirakov
- Manager: Nikolay Kostov
- Stadium: Vivacom Arena - Georgi Asparuhov
- First League: 4th
- Bulgarian Cup: Round of 16
- UEFA Europa Conference League: Play-off round
- Top goalscorer: League: Ricardinho (9); All: Ricardinho (11)
- Highest home attendance: 35,000 v. Eintracht Frankfurt (24 August 2023)
- Lowest home attendance: 1,948 v. Etar (23 September 2023)
- Average home league attendance: 6,717
- Biggest win: 6–0 v. Lokomotiv Sofia (H)
- Biggest defeat: 1–5 v. Ludogorets Razgrad (A)
| Home colours | Away colours | Third colours |

The 2023–24 season was Levski Sofia's 103rd season in the First League. This article shows player statistics and all matches (official and friendly) that the club has played during the season.

== Transfers ==
=== In ===
| No. | Pos. | Nat. | Name | Age | EU | Moving from | Type | Transfer window | Ends | Transfer fee | Source |
|---|---|---|---|---|---|---|---|---|---|---|---|
| 7 | FW | (Brazil) | Fábio Lima | 27 | Non-EU | (Brazil) ABC | Transfer | Winter | 2026 | Free | |
| 8 | MF | (Ghana) | Carlos Ohene | 30 | Non-EU | (Bulgaria) Hebar | Transfer | Winter | 2025 | Undisclosed | |
| 17 | FW | (Brazil) | Everton Bala | 25 | Non-EU | (Brazil) Mirassol | Loan | Winter | 2024 | | |
| 23 | MF | (Slovakia) | Patrik Myslovič | 22 | EU | (Slovakia) Žilina | Transfer | Winter | 2026 | Undisclosed | |
| 24 | DF | (Uruguay) | Joaquín Fernández | 25 | EU | (Uruguay) Atenas | Transfer | Winter | 2025 | Free | |
| 37 | MF | (Brazil) | Darlan | 25 | Non-EU | (Brazil) Grêmio | Transfer | Summer | 2026 | Free | |
| 97 | MF | (France) | Hassimi Fadiga | 26 | EU | (France) Le Mans | Transfer | Summer | 2025 | Free | |
| | MF | (Curaçao) | Nathan Holder | 21 | EU | (Bulgaria) Spartak Varna | Loan return | Summer | | | |
| | MF | (Bulgaria) | Zdravko Dimitrov | 24 | EU | (Turkey) Sakaryaspor | Loan return | Summer | | | |

=== Out ===
| No. | Pos. | Nat. | Name | Age | EU | Moving to | Type | Transfer window | Transfer fee | Source |
|---|---|---|---|---|---|---|---|---|---|---|
| 2 | DF | (France) | Jeremy Petris | 26 | EU | (Belgium) Charleroi | Transfer | Winter | Undisclosed | |
| 7 | FW | (Brazil) | Ronaldo | 23 | EU | (Russia) Rostov | Transfer | Winter | Undisclosed | |
| 10 | MF | (Bulgaria) | Ivelin Popov | 35 | EU | (Bulgaria) Botev Plovdiv | Released | Summer | Free | |
| 17 | FW | (Brazil) | Welton Felipe | 26 | EU | (Japan) Gamba Osaka | Transfer | Winter | Undisclosed | |
| 21 | DF | (Croatia) | Ante Blažević | 27 | EU | Croatia Zmijavci | Released | Summer | Free | |
| 23 | DF | (The Gambia) | Noah Sonko Sundberg | 27 | EU | (Bulgaria) Ludogorets Razgrad | Transfer | Summer | Undisclosed | |
| 30 | MF | (Bulgaria) | Filip Krastev | 21 | EU | (Belgium) Lommel | Loan return | Summer | | |
| 37 | MF | (Brazil) | Darlan | 25 | Non-EU | (China) Wuhan Three Towns | Transfer | Winter | Undisclosed | |

=== Loans out ===
| No. | Pos. | Nat. | Name | Age | EU | Moving to | Type | Transfer window | Transfer fee | Source |
|---|---|---|---|---|---|---|---|---|---|---|
| | MF | (Bulgaria) | Zdravko Dimitrov | 24 | EU | (Bulgaria) Septemvri Sofia | | Summer | | |
| | MF | (Bulgaria) | Antoan Stoyanov | 18 | EU | (Italy) Empoli | | Summer | | |
| | MF | (Bulgaria) | Zdravko Dimitrov | 25 | EU | (Turkey) Sakaryaspor | | Winter | | |
| | MF | (Curaçao) | Nathan Holder | 21 | EU | (Bulgaria) Sportist Svoge | | Winter | | |

== Squad ==
Updated on 1 March 2024.

| No. | Name | Nationality | Position(s) | Age | EU | Ends | Signed from | Transfer fee | Notes |
Goalkeepers
| 1 | Plamen Andreev | Bulgaria | GK | 21 | EU | 2025 | Youth system | W/S | |
| 13 | Nikolay Mihaylov | Bulgaria | GK | 38 | EU | 2024 | (Cyprus) Omonia | Free | Originally from Youth system |
| 99 | Ivan Andonov | Bulgaria | GK | 22 | EU | 2026 | Youth system | W/S | |
Defenders
| 4 | Viktor Lyubenov | Bulgaria | CB/LB | 20 | EU | 2026 | Youth system | W/S | |
| 5 | Kellian van der Kaap | Netherlands | CB/DM | 28 | EU | 2026 | (Denmark) Viborg | Free | Second nationality: Cameroon |
| 6 | Wenderson Tsunami | Brazil | LB | 30 | Non-EU | 2026 | (Brazil) Botafogo-PB | Free | Second nationality: Bulgaria |
| 22 | Patrik-Gabriel Galchev | Bulgaria | RB/LB/RW | 25 | EU | 2026 | Youth system | W/S | Second nationality: Spain |
| 24 | Joaquín Fernández | Uruguay | CB/LB | 27 | EU | 2025 | (Uruguay) Atenas | Free | Second nationality: Italy |
| 33 | José Córdoba | Panama | CB/LB | 25 | Non-EU | 2025 | (Bulgaria) Etar | Undisclosed | |
| 50 | Kristian Dimitrov | Bulgaria | CB | 29 | EU | 2026 | (Croatia) Hajduk Split | Free | |
| 77 | Deyvid Mihalev | Bulgaria | RB/DM/CM | 20 | EU | | Youth system | W/S | |
Midfielders
| 8 | Carlos Ohene | Ghana | DM | 33 | Non-EU | 2025 | (Bulgaria) Hebar | Undisclosed | |
| 10 | Asen Mitkov | Bulgaria | AM/CM | 21 | EU | 2025 | Youth system | W/S | |
| 14 | Iliyan Stefanov | Bulgaria | AM | 28 | EU | 2025 | (Bulgaria) Beroe | Free | Originally from Youth system |
| 15 | Aleksandar Bozhilov | Bulgaria | DM/LB | 20 | EU | | Youth system | W/S | |
| 20 | Asen Chandarov | Bulgaria | AM/CM | 27 | EU | 2026 | (Bulgaria) Septemvri Sofia | Undisclosed | Originally from Youth system |
| 21 | Kristiyan Yovov | Bulgaria | AM | 20 | EU | | Youth system | W/S | |
| 23 | Patrik Myslovič | Slovakia | AM | 25 | EU | 2026 | (Slovakia) Žilina | Free | |
| 97 | Hassimi Fadiga | France | AM/LW/SS | 29 | EU | 2025 | (France) Le Mans | Free | Second nationality: Guinea |
Forwards
| 7 | Fábio Lima | Brazil | LW | 29 | Non-EU | 2026 | (Brazil) ABC | Free | |
| 9 | Ricardinho | Brazil | CF/LW/RW | 25 | Non-EU | 2025 | (Brazil) Grêmio | Free | |
| 11 | Jawad El Jemili | Spain | RW/LW/AM | 24 | EU | 2026 | (Cyprus) Akritas Chlorakas | Undisclosed | Second nationality: Morocco |
| 16 | Preslav Bachev | Bulgaria | CF | 20 | EU | 2026 | Youth system | W/S | |
| 17 | Everton Bala | Brazil | RW/LW | 27 | Non-EU | 2024 | (Brazil) Mirassol | Loan | |
| 19 | Bilal Bari | Morocco | CF | 28 | EU | 2024 | (Bulgaria) Montana | €50 000 | Second nationality: France |
| 88 | Marin Petkov | Bulgaria | RW/CF/AM | 23 | EU | 2027 | Youth system | W/S | |

== Performance overview ==
| Competition | First match | Last match | Starting round | Final position | Record | | | | | | | |
| Competition | First match | Last match | Starting round | Final position | Pld | W | D | L | GF | GA | GD | Win % |
|---|---|---|---|---|---|---|---|---|---|---|---|---|
| First League | 15 July 2023 | 26 May 2024 | Matchday 1 | 4th | 35 | 19 | 7 | 9 | 50 | 30 | +20 | 54.29 |
| Bulgarian Cup | 22 November 2023 | 6 December 2023 | Round of 32 | Round of 16 | 2 | 1 | 0 | 1 | 4 | 3 | +1 | 50.00 |
| UEFA Europa Conference League | 27 July 2023 | 31 August 2023 | Second qualifying round | Play-off round | 6 | 3 | 2 | 1 | 6 | 4 | +2 | 50.00 |
| Total | | | | | 43 | 23 | 9 | 11 | 60 | 37 | +23 | 53.49 |

Last updated: 26 May 2024
Source: Fixtures

== Fixtures ==
Win Draw Loss Upcoming fixture

=== Friendlies ===
==== Summer ====
| 25 June 2023 | Levski Sofia | 2–1 | Pirin Blagoevgrad | Sofia |
| 18:00 UTC+3 | Bachev 1'; Ricardinho 90' (pen.) | Report | Kondrakov 27' | Stadium: Vivacom Arena - Georgi Asparuhov; Referee: Mariyan Grebencharski (Samokov) |

| 30 June 2023 | Levski Sofia | 2–1 | Etar | Pravets |
| 18:00 UTC+3 | Aleksandrov 43' (o.g.); El Jemili 44' | Report | Chano 49' | Stadium: Gradski; Referee: Stanimir Trenchev (Sofia) |

| 4 July 2023 | Levski Sofia | 3–1 | Maritsa Plovdiv | Pravets |
| 10:30 UTC+3 | Chandarov 43'; Stefanov 47'; Ronaldo 79' | Report | Malamov 42' | Stadium: Gradski; Referee: Ivaylo Nenkov (Sofia) |

| 8 July 2023 | Levski Sofia (Bulgaria) | 0–0 | (Cyprus) APOEL | Pravets |
| 18:00 UTC+3 | | Report | | Stadium: Gradski; Referee: Dimitar Burov (Sofia) |

==== Winter ====
| 17 January 2024 | Levski Sofia (Bulgaria) | 2–3 | (Hungary) Vasas | Belek, Turkey |
| 16:00 UTC+3 | Tsunami 15'; Stefanov 48' | Report | Hinora 61'; Ihrig-Farkas 72'; Papp 81' | Stadium: Kaya Palazzo Sports Complex |

| 21 January 2024 | Levski Sofia (Bulgaria) | 1–2 | (Ukraine) Oleksandriya | Belek, Turkey |
| 17:00 UTC+3 | Ricardinho 39' (pen.) | Report | Shulyanskyi 45'; Kostyshyn 62' | Stadium: Gloria Sports Arena |

| 23 January 2024 | Levski Sofia (Bulgaria) | 1–2 | (Kosovo) Dukagjini | Belek, Turkey |
| 17:00 UTC+3 | El Jemili 75' | Report | Morina 7'; Iseni 14' | Stadium: Kaya Palazzo Sports Complex |

| 24 January 2024 | Levski Sofia (Bulgaria) | 2–0 | (Bosnia and Herzegovina) Tuzla City | Belek, Turkey |
| 17:00 UTC+3 | Ricardinho 23'; Petkov 57' (pen.) | Report | | Stadium: Kaya Palazzo Sports Complex |

| 30 January 2024 | Levski Sofia (Bulgaria) | 0–3 | (Czech Republic) Baník Ostrava | Belek, Turkey |
| 17:00 UTC+3 | | Report | Klíma 21', 28'; Kubala 43' | Stadium: Kaya Palazzo Sports Complex |

| 2 February 2024 | Levski Sofia (Bulgaria) | 1–0 | (Ukraine) Dynamo Kyiv | Belek, Turkey |
| 17:00 UTC+3 | Galchev 22' | Report | | Stadium: Kaya Palazzo Sports Complex |

| 3 February 2024 | Levski Sofia (Bulgaria) | 2–1 | (Ukraine) Shakhtar Donetsk U19 | Belek, Turkey |
| 17:00 UTC+3 | Fábio Lima 22' (pen.); Fernández 62' | Report | Drozd 88' | Stadium: Kaya Palazzo Sports Complex |

| 7 February 2024 | Levski Sofia (Bulgaria) | 3–1 | (Latvia) Riga | Belek, Turkey |
| 17:00 UTC+3 | Petkov 21'; Ricardinho 45' (pen.); El Jemili 49' | Report | Jurkovskis 6' | Stadium: Mardan Sports Complex |

=== First League ===
==== Preliminary stage ====
===== League table =====
| Pos | Team | Pld | W | D | L | GF | GA | GD | Pts | Qualification |
|---|---|---|---|---|---|---|---|---|---|---|
| 3 | Cherno More | 30 | 18 | 8 | 4 | 47 | 25 | +22 | 62 | Qualification for the Championship group |
| 4 | Lokomotiv Plovdiv | 30 | 16 | 7 | 7 | 50 | 34 | +16 | 55 | Qualification for the Championship group |
| 5 | Levski Sofia | 30 | 16 | 6 | 8 | 45 | 26 | +19 | 54 | Qualification for the Championship group |
| 6 | Krumovgrad | 30 | 12 | 8 | 10 | 35 | 35 | 0 | 44 (Note: Head-to-head points: Krumovgrad 6, Botev Plovdiv 0.) | Qualification for the Championship group |
| 7 | Botev Plovdiv | 30 | 12 | 8 | 10 | 47 | 33 | +14 | 44 | Qualification for the Conference League group |

Source: soccerway, Bulgarian Football
Rules for classification: 1) Points; 2) Head-to-head points; 3) Head-to-head goal difference; 4) Head-to-head goals scored; 5) Head-to-head away goals scored (only if two teams); 6) Goal difference; 7) Goals scored; 8) Fairplay ranking; 9) Draw

===== Results summary =====
| Overall | | | | | | | | Home | | | | | | Away | | | | | |
| Pld | W | D | L | GF | GA | GD | Pts | W | D | L | GF | GA | GD | W | D | L | GF | GA | GD |
|---|---|---|---|---|---|---|---|---|---|---|---|---|---|---|---|---|---|---|---|
| 30 | 16 | 6 | 8 | 45 | 26 | +19 | 54 | 10 | 2 | 3 | 24 | 6 | +18 | 6 | 4 | 5 | 21 | 20 | +1 |

Last updated: 20 April 2024.
Source: bulgarian-football.com

===== Results by round =====
| Round | 1 | 2 | 3 | 4 | 5 | 6 | 7 | 8 | 9 | 10 | 11 | 12 | 13 | 14 | 15 | 16 | 17 | 18 | 19 | 20 | 21 | 22 | 23 | 24 | 25 | 26 | 27 | 28 | 29 | 30 |
|---|---|---|---|---|---|---|---|---|---|---|---|---|---|---|---|---|---|---|---|---|---|---|---|---|---|---|---|---|---|---|
| Ground | H | A | H | A | H | H | A | H | A | H | A | H | A | H | A | A | H | A | H | A | A | H | A | H | A | H | A | H | A | H |
| Result | L | W | W | L | W | W | D | W | D | W | W | L | D | W | L | L | D | D | W | W | W | W | W | D | W | W | L | L | L | W |
| Position | 14 | 9 | 5 | 5 | 5 | 7 | 8 | 8 | 4 | 3 | 3 | 5 | 5 | 4 | 5 | 5 | 6 | 6 | 6 | 6 | 5 | 4 | 4 | 4 | 4 | 4 | 4 | 5 | 5 | 5 |

Updated to match(es) played on 20 April 2024. Source: See Results
A = Away; H = Home; W = Win; D = Draw; L = Loss

===== Matches =====
The league fixtures were announced on 14 June 2023.

| 15 July 2023 1 | Levski Sofia | 1–2 | CSKA 1948 | Sofia |
| 18:45 UTC+3 | Ricardinho 32'; Petkov (yellow card) 60'; Popov (yellow card) 82'; Welton (yellow card) 90+4' | Report | Pedrinho 41' (pen.); Rapnouil (yellow card) 78'; Héliton 80'; Daskalov (yellow card) 81'; Kjartansson (yellow card) 87'; Naumov (yellow card) 90' | Stadium: Vivacom Arena - Georgi Asparuhov; Attendance: 5,500; Referee: Radoslav Gidzhenov (Plovdiv); Man of the Match: Welton Felipe |

| 22 July 2023 2 | Botev Plovdiv | 1–3 | Levski Sofia | Plovdiv |
| 18:45 UTC+3 | Akere (yellow card) 35'; Sekulić 81'; Nnadi (yellow card) 85' | Report | Mitkov (yellow card) 18'; Petris (yellow card) 35'; Petkov (yellow card) 49'; Ricardinho 56' (pen.); El Jemili 74', 86', (yellow card) 90+3' | Stadium: Hristo Botev; Attendance: 9,356; Referee: Valentin Zhelezov (Burgas); Man of the Match: Jawad El Jemili |

| 30 July 2023 3 | Levski Sofia | 6–0 | Lokomotiv Sofia | Sofia |
| 21:15 UTC+3 | Kraev 20'; El Jemili 38', 51'; Petkov 65'; Ronaldo 72'; Stefanov 79', (yellow card) 81' | Report | Dias (yellow card) 55' | Stadium: Vivacom Arena - Georgi Asparuhov; Attendance: 6,500; Referee: Dragomir Draganov (Varna); Man of the Match: Jawad El Jemili |

| 6 August 2023 4 | Lokomotiv Plovdiv | 2–1 | Levski Sofia | Plovdiv |
| 21:15 UTC+3 | Giovanny 8'; Minchev 40', (yellow card) 72'; Conteh (yellow card) 82' | Report | Ricardinho 32' van der Kaap (yellow card) 53'; Popov (yellow card) 63'; Welton (yellow card) 71' | Stadium: Lokomotiv; Attendance: 4,344; Referee: Volen Chinkov (Sofia); Man of the Match: Giovanny |

| 13 August 2023 5 | Levski Sofia | 1–0 | Botev Vratsa | Sofia |
| 18:45 UTC+3 | Mitkov (yellow card) 59'; Chandarov (yellow card) 72'; Bachev 83' | Report | Perea (yellow card) 45+1'; Barrios (yellow card) 80'; Mendoza (yellow card) 87' | Stadium: Vivacom Arena - Georgi Asparuhov; Attendance: 3,411; Referee: Stanimir Trenchev (Sofia); Man of the Match: Preslav Bachev |

| 3 September 2023 8 | Levski Sofia | 1–0 | Hebar | Sofia |
| 21:15 UTC+3 | Ronaldo 90+4' | Report | Nikolaev (yellow card) 28'; Nikolov (yellow card) 76'; Igonen (yellow card) 90+2' | Stadium: Vivacom Arena - Georgi Asparuhov; Attendance: 3,000; Referee: Vasimir El-Hatib (Sofia); Man of the Match: Ronaldo |

| 14 September 2023 6 | Levski Sofia | 2–0 | Pirin Blagoevgrad | Sofia |
| 20:30 UTC+3 | Welton (yellow card) 45+3', (goal) 78'; Dimitrov (yellow card) 46'; Tsunami (yellow card) 81'; Mitkov 87' | Report | Dyulgerov (yellow card) 32'; Bachev (yellow card) 63'; Tasev (yellow card) 66'; Medved (yellow card) 73' | Stadium: Vivacom Arena - Georgi Asparuhov; Attendance: 5,800; Referee: Ivaylo Stoyanov (Petrich); Man of the Match: Welton Felipe |
Note: Originally scheduled for 19 August 2023, the match was postponed by the BFU due to Levski's participation in the UECL.

| 18 September 2023 9 | Krumovgrad | 2–2 | Levski Sofia | Plovdiv (Note: Krumovgrad will host their matches at Nikola Shterev - Starika Sports Complex, Plovdiv, as their own venue, Krumovgrad Stadium, Krumovgrad, does not meet BFU requirements.) |
| 20:00 UTC+3 | Tonev 21'; Velyev (yellow card) 52'; Kolev 75'; Miljanović (yellow card) 82'; K. Pehlivanov (yellow card) 87'; Katsarov (yellow card) 90+3' | Report | Tsunami 26'; Ricardinho 32' | Stadium: Nikola Shterev - Starika Sports Complex; Attendance: 1,300; Referee: Georgi Davidov (Veliko Tarnovo); Man of the Match: Aleksandar Kolev |

| 23 September 2023 10 | Levski Sofia | 1–0 | Etar | Sofia |
| 20:00 UTC+3 | Welton (yellow card) 19'; Kraev (yellow card) 74'; Mitkov 81' | Report | Stanev (yellow card) 45+4'; Hristov (yellow card) 68'; Bakalov (yellow card) 85'; Stoyanov (yellow card) 90+8' | Stadium: Vivacom Arena - Georgi Asparuhov; Attendance: 1,948; Referee: Ivo Andreev (Sofia); Man of the Match: Asen Mitkov |

| 27 September 2023 11 | Slavia Sofia | 0–2 | Levski Sofia | Sofia |
| 18:00 UTC+3 | Georgiev (yellow card) 37'; Dobrev (yellow card) 43' | Report | Tsunami (yellow card) 18'; Fadiga (red card) 23'; Ronaldo 34'; Darlan (yellow card) 50'; Welton 54'; Petris (yellow card) 88' | Stadium: Aleksandar Shalamanov; Attendance: 4,402; Referee: Valentin Zhelezov (Burgas); Man of the Match: Welton Felipe |

| 1 October 2023 12 | Levski Sofia | 0–1 | Ludogorets Razgrad | Sofia |
| 20:30 UTC+3 | Petris (yellow card) 14'; Córdoba (yellow card) 37'; Tsunami (yellow card) 90+2' | Report | Rwan Cruz 25', (yellow card) 61'; Piotrowski (yellow card) 50'; Caio Vidal (yellow card) 58'; Tekpetey (yellow card) 69'; Padt (yellow card) 80'; Gonçalves (yellow card) 83' | Stadium: Vivacom Arena - Georgi Asparuhov; Attendance: 9,472; Referee: Georgi Ginchev (Veliko Tarnovo); Man of the Match: Rwan Cruz |

| 7 October 2023 13 | CSKA Sofia | 1–1 | Levski Sofia | Sofia |
| 14:45 UTC+3 | Lindseth 49'; Heintz (yellow card) 54'; Youga (yellow card) 75'; Estrada (yellow card) 75'; Carreazo (yellow card) 90+2' | Report | Ronaldo 43'; Mitkov (yellow card) 48'; Ricardinho (yellow card) 75'; Dimitrov (yellow card) 75'; Bachev (yellow card) 90+7' | Stadium: Vasil Levski National Stadium; Attendance: 17,532; Referee: Radoslav Gidzhenov (Plovdiv); Man of the Match: Jonathan Lindseth |

| 22 October 2023 14 | Levski Sofia | 1–0 | Cherno More | Sofia |
| 16:30 UTC+3 | Petris (yellow card) 39'; El Jemili 57'; Córdoba (yellow card) 87' | Report | Drobarov (red card) 22'; Popov (yellow card) 90' | Stadium: Vivacom Arena - Georgi Asparuhov; Attendance: 6,566; Referee: Nikola Popov (Sofia); Man of the Match: Jawad El Jemili |

| 27 October 2023 15 | Beroe | 2–1 | Levski Sofia | Stara Zagora |
| 19:00 UTC+3 | Politino 4'; Laszo (yellow card) 23'; Cascardo (yellow card) 40'; Godoy 73'; Govea (yellow card) 90+5'; Accinelli (yellow card) 90+8' | Report | Dimitrov 45'; Mitkov (yellow card) 57'; Petkov (yellow card) 90+5' | Stadium: Beroe; Attendance: 3,563; Referee: Vasil Minev (Sofia); Man of the Match: Santiago Godoy |

| 1 November 2023 7 | Arda | 0–0 | Levski Sofia | Kardzhali |
| 19:30 UTC+2 | Krachunov (yellow card) 44'; Tetah (yellow card) 72'; Borukov (yellow card) 90+5' | Report | Tsunami (yellow card) 27'; Kraev (yellow card) 39' van der Kaap (yellow card) 55'; Córdoba (yellow card) 69' | Stadium: Arena Arda; Attendance: 3,000; Referee: Valentin Zhelezov (Burgas); Man of the Match: Anatoli Gospodinov |
Note: Originally scheduled for 27 August 2023, the match was postponed by the BFU due to Levski's participation in the UECL.

| 7 November 2023 16 | CSKA 1948 | 1–0 | Levski Sofia | Bistritsa |
| 17:30 UTC+2 | Pedrinho (yellow card) 36', (goal) 59'; Vasilev (yellow card) 75'; Vutov (red card) 80' | Report | Ricardinho (yellow card) 89' | Stadium: Bistritsa; Attendance: 2,022; Referee: Dragomir Draganov (Varna); Man of the Match: Pedrinho |

| 12 November 2023 17 | Levski Sofia | 1–1 | Botev Plovdiv | Sofia |
| 15:30 UTC+2 | Córdoba (yellow card) 8'; Tsunami 18'; Petris (yellow card) 90+6' | Report | Perera (yellow card) 12'; Baroan 54'; Balogiannis (yellow card) 71'; Popov (yellow card) 82'; Mertens (yellow card) 90+6' | Stadium: Vivacom Arena - Georgi Asparuhov; Attendance: 4,600; Referee: Nikola Popov (Sofia); Man of the Match: Ivelin Popov |

| 27 November 2023 18 | Lokomotiv Sofia | 2–2 | Levski Sofia | Sofia |
| 17:30 UTC+2 | Naydenov (yellow card) 62'; Mitkov 76', 90+5' (pen.); França (yellow card) 82'; Traoré (yellow card) 82' | Report | Petkov 27' van der Kaap (yellow card) 42'; Ricardinho (yellow card) 45+2'; Kraev 70' | Stadium: Lokomotiv; Attendance: 630; Referee: Radoslav Gidzhenov (Plovdiv); Man of the Match: Dimitar Mitkov |

| 2 December 2023 19 | Levski Sofia | 3–0 | Lokomotiv Plovdiv | Sofia |
| 17:30 UTC+2 | Dimitrov 14'; Welton 42'; Kraev (yellow card) 72'; Ricardinho 85' (pen.) | Report | Ewandro (yellow card) 11'; Kamdem (yellow card) 46'; Giovanny (yellow card) 84' | Stadium: Vivacom Arena - Georgi Asparuhov; Attendance: 3,658; Referee: Valentin Zhelezov (Burgas); Man of the Match: Welton Felipe |

| 9 December 2023 20 | Botev Vratsa | 0–1 | Levski Sofia | Vratsa |
| 17:30 UTC+2 | Majouga (yellow card) 43'; Kunde (yellow card) 54' | Report | Chandarov (yellow card) 26'; Darlan 32'; Petkov (yellow card) 55'; Welton (yellow card) 83' van der Kaap (yellow card) 90+5' | Stadium: Hristo Botev; Attendance: 850; Referee: Georgi Davidov (Veliko Tarnovo); Man of the Match: Darlan |

| 17 February 2024 21 | Pirin Blagoevgrad | 1–2 | Levski Sofia | Blagoevgrad |
| 17:00 UTC+2 | Komano 16'; Bengyuzov (yellow card) 45+2'; Bodurov (yellow card) 63'; Varbanov (yellow card) 83' | Report | Petkov 7'; Córdoba (red card) 34'; Ricardinho 40'; Galchev (yellow card) 87' | Stadium: Hristo Botev; Attendance: 5,800; Referee: Nikola Popov (Sofia); Man of the Match: Ricardinho |

| 24 February 2024 22 | Levski Sofia | 4–0 | Arda | Sofia |
| 17:45 UTC+2 | Petkov 9'; Galchev 33'; Fábio Lima 44'; El Jemili 49'; Tsunami (yellow card) 78' | Report | Hüseynov (yellow card) 48'; Stoev (red card) 52'; Krachunov (yellow card) 89' | Stadium: Vivacom Arena - Georgi Asparuhov; Attendance: 7,900; Referee: Ivaylo Stoyanov (Petrich); Man of the Match: Patrik-Gabriel Galchev |

| 4 March 2024 23 | Hebar | 0–1 | Levski Sofia | Pazardzhik |
| 17:30 UTC+2 | Karakashev (yellow card) 77' | Report | Dimitrov (yellow card) 55'; Fábio Lima 74'; Ohene (yellow card) 90+3' | Stadium: Georgi Benkovski; Attendance: 2,800; Referee: Dragomir Draganov (Varna); Man of the Match: Fábio Lima |

| 10 March 2024 24 | Levski Sofia | 0–0 | Krumovgrad | Sofia |
| 15:15 UTC+2 | Mitkov (yellow card) 18'; Galchev (red card) 40'; Ohene (yellow card) 45+2'; Ricardinho (yellow card) 75' | Report | Velyev (yellow card) 33'; O. Yusein (yellow card) 45+2'; Katsarov (yellow card) 55'; Patrick Luan (yellow card) 72'; Raposo (yellow card) 79'; Ali (yellow card) 89' | Stadium: Vivacom Arena - Georgi Asparuhov; Attendance: 8,000; Referee: Ivaylo Nenkov (Sofia); Man of the Match: Marin Petkov |

| 16 March 2024 25 | Etar | 0–3 | Levski Sofia | Veliko Tarnovo |
| 15:15 UTC+2 | Morán (yellow card) 45'; Van Rankin (yellow card) 66'; Stoyanov (yellow card) 69'; Guessoum (yellow card) 72'; Yankov (yellow card) 87' | Report | Dimitrov (yellow card) 29'; El Jemili 52', 90+7'; Petkov 82'; Córdoba (yellow card) 90' | Stadium: Ivaylo; Attendance: 4,500; Referee: Vladimir Valkov (Plovdiv); Man of the Match: Jawad El Jemili |

| 29 March 2024 26 | Levski Sofia | 2–0 | Slavia Sofia | Sofia |
| 19:00 UTC+2 | Ricardinho (yellow card) 32', (goal) 38'; Petkov 90+5' | Report | Martinov (yellow card) 3'; Vutsov (yellow card) 44'; Stoev (yellow card) 51' | Stadium: Vivacom Arena - Georgi Asparuhov; Attendance: 8,756; Referee: Radoslav Gidzhenov (Plovdiv); Man of the Match: Marin Petkov |

| 3 April 2024 27 | Ludogorets Razgrad | 5–1 | Levski Sofia | Razgrad |
| 19:30 UTC+3 | Rwan Cruz 3', (yellow card) 29'; Piotrowski (yellow card) 39', (goal) 56'; Terziev 47'; Duah 63'; Caio Vidal 90+2' | Report | Petkov 16', (yellow card) 49'; Tsunami (yellow card) 21'; Ohene (yellow card) 28'; Galchev (yellow card) 45+3'; Mihalev (yellow card) 79' | Stadium: Huvepharma Arena; Attendance: 4,577; Referee: Georgi Kabakov (Plovdiv); Man of the Match: Jakub Piotrowski |

| 7 April 2024 28 | Levski Sofia | 0–2 | CSKA Sofia | Sofia |
| 14:45 UTC+3 | Andonov (yellow card) 24' | Report | Heintz 61'; Karanga 77', (yellow card) 78'; Lindseth (yellow card) 86' | Stadium: Vasil Levski National Stadium; Attendance: 25,556; Referee: Dragomir Draganov (Varna); Man of the Match: Tobias Heintz |

| 13 April 2024 29 | Cherno More | 3–1 | Levski Sofia | Varna |
| 20:15 UTC+3 | Isa (yellow card) 38', (goal) 40'; Calcan (yellow card) 65', (goal) 67'; Iliev 81' | Report | Ricardinho (yellow card) 6', (goal) 51'; Ohene (yellow card) 60'; Tsunami (yellow card) 83'; Bari (yellow card) 90+4' | Stadium: Ticha; Attendance: 5,044; Referee: Vladimir Valkov (Plovdiv); Man of the Match: Ismail Isa |

| 20 April 2024 30 | Levski Sofia | 1–0 | Beroe | Sofia |
| 20:15 UTC+3 | Fadiga 76'; Córdoba (yellow card) 90+5'; Petkov (yellow card) 90+6' | Report | Algarra (yellow card) 20'; Zanetti (yellow card) 49'; Arthur Motta (yellow card) 73'; Squadrone (red card) 82'; Govea (yellow card) 90'; Akinjogunla (yellow card) 90+1'; Ramos Mingo (yellow card) 90+5' | Stadium: Vivacom Arena - Georgi Asparuhov; Attendance: 5,049; Referee: Volen Chinkov (Sofia); Man of the Match: Hassimi Fadiga |

==== Championship round ====
===== League table =====
| Pos | Team | Pld | W | D | L | GF | GA | GD | Pts | Qualification |
|---|---|---|---|---|---|---|---|---|---|---|
| 1 | Ludogorets Razgrad (C) | 35 | 26 | 4 | 5 | 87 | 24 | +63 | 82 | Qualification for the Champions League first qualifying round |
| 2 | Cherno More | 35 | 22 | 9 | 4 | 56 | 26 | +30 | 75 | Qualification for the Conference League second qualifying round |
| 3 | CSKA Sofia | 35 | 20 | 7 | 8 | 56 | 27 | +29 | 67 | Qualification for the Conference League play-off |
| 4 | Levski Sofia | 35 | 19 | 7 | 9 | 50 | 30 | +20 | 64 | |
| 5 | Lokomotiv Plovdiv | 35 | 17 | 7 | 11 | 53 | 44 | +9 | 58 | |
| 6 | Krumovgrad | 35 | 13 | 10 | 12 | 45 | 45 | 0 | 49 | |

Source: Soccerway, Bulgarian Football
Rules for classification: 1) Points; 2) Head-to-head points; 3) Head-to-head goal difference; 4) Head-to-head goals scored; 5) Head-to-head away goals scored (only if two teams); 6) Goal difference; 7) Goals scored; 8) Fairplay ranking; 9) Draw.
(C) Champions

===== Results summary =====
| Overall | | | | | | | | Home | | | | | | Away | | | | | |
| Pld | W | D | L | GF | GA | GD | Pts | W | D | L | GF | GA | GD | W | D | L | GF | GA | GD |
|---|---|---|---|---|---|---|---|---|---|---|---|---|---|---|---|---|---|---|---|
| 5 | 3 | 1 | 1 | 5 | 4 | +1 | 10 | 1 | 1 | 0 | 1 | 0 | +1 | 2 | 0 | 1 | 4 | 4 | 0 |

Last updated: 26 May 2024.
Source: See results

===== Results by round =====
| Round | 1 | 2 | 3 | 4 | 5 |
|---|---|---|---|---|---|
| Ground | A | H | A | A | H |
| Result | L | D | W | W | W |
| Position | 5 | 4 | 4 | 4 | 4 |

Source: See Results
A = Away; H = Home; W = Win; D = Draw; L = Loss

===== Matches =====
| 27 April 2024 31 | CSKA Sofia | 3–1 | Levski Sofia | Sofia |
| 16:15 UTC+3 | Sanyang (yellow card) 15'; Skarsem 25'; Lindseth 35'; Mattheij (yellow card) 44'; Carreazo 45'; Karanga (yellow card) 45' | Report | El Jemili (yellow card) 29'; Fadiga 61'; Córdoba (yellow card) 66' | Stadium: Vasil Levski National Stadium; Attendance: 11,948; Referee: Georgi Kabakov (Plovdiv); Man of the Match: Olaus Skarsem |

| 12 May 2024 32 | Levski Sofia | 0–0 | Cherno More | Sofia |
| 19:40 UTC+3 | Everton (yellow card) 74'; Fadiga (yellow card) 90' | Report | Dani Martín (yellow card) 90+1' | Stadium: Vivacom Arena - Georgi Asparuhov; Attendance: 3,700; Referee: Radoslav Gidzhenov (Plovdiv); Man of the Match: Marin Petkov |

| 18 May 2024 33 | Lokomotiv Plovdiv | 1–2 | Levski Sofia | Plovdiv |
| 20:15 UTC+3 | Ntelo 10'; Peshov (yellow card) 60'; Raynov (yellow card) 69'; Segura (yellow card) 70'; Iliev (yellow card) 90+1' | Report | Tsunami 29'; Ricardinho 32'; Ohene (yellow card) 73'; Petkov (yellow card) 87'; Bari (yellow card) 90+1' | Stadium: Lokomotiv; Attendance: 5,500; Referee: Valentin Zhelezov (Burgas); Man of the Match: Asen Mitkov |

| 22 May 2024 34 | Krumovgrad | 0–1 | Levski Sofia | Plovdiv |
| 16:00 UTC+3 | | Report | Córdoba (yellow card) 21'; Tsunami 90+1' | Stadium: Nikola Shterev - Starika Sports Complex; Attendance: 1,500; Referee: Hristiyana Guteva (Sofia); Man of the Match: Wenderson Tsunami |

| 26 May 2024 35 | Levski Sofia | 1–0 | Ludogorets Razgrad | Sofia |
| 18:00 UTC+3 | Galchev (yellow card) 10'; Fábio Lima 48'; Chandarov (red card) 84' | Report | Y. Yordanov (yellow card) 66' | Stadium: Vivacom Arena - Georgi Asparuhov; Attendance: 4,777; Referee: Kristiyan Kolev (Plovdiv); Man of the Match: Fábio Lima |

=== Bulgarian Cup ===
| 22 November 2023 Round of 32 | Dunav Ruse | 1–3 | Levski Sofia | Ruse |
| 18:00 UTC+2 | Valchev 30'; Georgiev (yellow card) 53'; Hasan (yellow card) 89' | Report | Galchev (yellow card) 18'; Ricardinho 25', 45+2' (pen.), (yellow card) 79'; Chandarov (yellow card) 46'; Stefanov (red card) 53'; Ronaldo 56' | Stadium: Gradski; Attendance: 3,455; Referee: Vladimir Valkov (Plovdiv) |

| 6 December 2023 Round of 16 | Hebar | 2–1 | Levski Sofia | Pazardzhik |
| 14:30 UTC+2 | Bastunov 68' (pen.); Nikolov (yellow card) 73'; Kabov 90+9' | Report | Mitkov (yellow card) 62'; Welton 90+1' | Stadium: Georgi Benkovski; Attendance: 2,500; Referee: Vasimir El-Hatib (Sofia) |

=== UEFA Europa Conference League ===
==== Second qualifying round ====
| 27 July 2023 1st leg | Shkupi (North Macedonia) | 0–2 | (Bulgaria) Levski Sofia | Skopje, North Macedonia |
| 21:00 UTC+2 | Queven (yellow card) 34'; Pintér (yellow card) 87'; Ramani (yellow card) 89'; Iljazi (yellow card) 90+5'; Trapanovski (yellow card) 90+6' | Report | Welton 31'; Dimitrov (yellow card) 34' van der Kaap (yellow card) 49'; Petris (yellow card) 71'; Ronaldo 90+4' | Stadium: Toše Proeski Arena (Note: Shkupi played their home match at the Toše Proeski Arena in Skopje, instead of their regular stadium, the Čair Stadium in Skopje, which did not meet UEFA requirements.); Attendance: 6,000; Referee: David Fuxman (Israel) |

| 3 August 2023 2nd leg | Levski Sofia (Bulgaria) | 1–0 (3–0 agg.) | (North Macedonia) Shkupi | Sofia, Bulgaria |
| 20:00 UTC+3 | Chandarov (yellow card) 88'; Petkov 90+11', (yellow card) 90+11' | Report | Adem (yellow card) 35'; Queven (yellow card) 49'; Toshevski (yellow card) 82'; Trapanovski (yellow card) 86' | Stadium: Vivacom Arena - Georgi Asparuhov; Attendance: 16,424; Referee: Lionel Tschudi (Switzerland) |

==== Third qualifying round ====
| 10 August 2023 1st leg | Hapoel Be'er Sheva (Israel) | 0–0 | (Bulgaria) Levski Sofia | Be'er Sheva, Israel |
| 20:30 UTC+3 | Elias (yellow card) 77'; Miguel Vítor (yellow card) 87' | Report | Córdoba (yellow card) 38'; Kraev (yellow card) 69' | Stadium: Turner Stadium; Attendance: 8,974; Referee: Miguel Nogueira (Portugal) |

| 17 August 2023 2nd leg | Levski Sofia (Bulgaria) | 2–1 (2–1 agg.) | (Israel) Hapoel Be'er Sheva | Sofia, Bulgaria |
| 20:00 UTC+3 | Welton 15'; Mitkov (yellow card) 21'; Tsunami (yellow card) 77'; Stefanov (yellow card) 89'; Ronaldo 90+6'; Andonov (yellow card) 90+7'; El Jemili (yellow card) 90+9' | Report | Gordana (yellow card) 42'; Hélder Lopes (yellow card) 64'; Yehezkel (yellow card) 66'; Stoyanov 79'; Elias (yellow card) 90+9'; Klimala (yellow card) 90+10' | Stadium: Vivacom Arena - Georgi Asparuhov; Attendance: 16,832; Referee: Dumitri Muntean (Moldova) |

==== Play-off round ====
| 24 August 2023 1st leg | Levski Sofia (Bulgaria) | 1–1 | (Germany) Eintracht Frankfurt | Sofia, Bulgaria |
| 20:00 UTC+3 | Kraev (yellow card) 58'; Córdoba (yellow card) 83'; Tsunami (yellow card) 86'; Fadiga 90+5' | Report | Kolo Muani 6'; Dina Ebimbe (yellow card) 83' | Stadium: Vasil Levski National Stadium (Note: Levski played their play-off round home match at the Vasil Levski National Stadium in Sofia, instead of their regular stadium, Stadion Georgi Asparuhov in Sofia.); Attendance: 35,000; Referee: Adam Ladebäck (Sweden) |

| 31 August 2023 2nd leg | Eintracht Frankfurt (Germany) | 2–0 (3–1 agg.) | (Bulgaria) Levski Sofia | Frankfurt, Germany |
| 20:30 UTC+2 | Buta (yellow card) 38'; Ngankam 79'; Skhiri 86' | Report | Ronaldo (yellow card) 18'; Tsunami (yellow card) 27'; Dimitrov (yellow card) 34' van der Kaap (yellow card) 64' | Stadium: Deutsche Bank Park; Attendance: 46,000; Referee: Allard Lindhout (Netherlands) |

== Squad statistics ==
=== Appearances and goals ===
As of 26 May 2024

| No. | Pos | Nat | Player | Total | | First League | | Bulgarian Cup | | Conference League | |
| No. | Pos | Nat | Player | Apps | Goals | Apps | Goals | Apps | Goals | Apps | Goals |
|---|---|---|---|---|---|---|---|---|---|---|---|
| 1 | GK | (Bulgaria) BUL | Plamen Andreev | 38 | 0 | 29+1 | 0 | 2 | 0 | 6 | 0 |
| 4 | DF | (Bulgaria) BUL | Viktor Lyubenov | 3 | 0 | 0+2 | 0 | 1 | 0 | 0 | 0 |
| 5 | DF | (Netherlands) NED | Kellian van der Kaap | 32 | 0 | 23+2 | 0 | 2 | 0 | 4+1 | 0 |
| 6 | DF | (Brazil) BRA | Wenderson Tsunami | 38 | 4 | 30+1 | 4 | 1 | 0 | 6 | 0 |
| 7 | FW | (Brazil) BRA | Fábio Lima | 11 | 3 | 10+1 | 3 | 0 | 0 | 0 | 0 |
| 8 | MF | (Ghana) GHA | Carlos Ohene | 14 | 0 | 13+1 | 0 | 0 | 0 | 0 | 0 |
| 9 | FW | (Brazil) BRA | Ricardinho | 39 | 11 | 27+4 | 9 | 2 | 2 | 6 | 0 |
| 10 | MF | (Bulgaria) BUL | Asen Mitkov | 32 | 2 | 20+5 | 2 | 1 | 0 | 5+1 | 0 |
| 11 | FW | (Spain) ESP | Jawad El Jemili | 35 | 8 | 27+2 | 8 | 0 | 0 | 3+3 | 0 |
| 13 | GK | (Bulgaria) BUL | Nikolay Mihaylov | 4 | 0 | 4 | 0 | 0 | 0 | 0 | 0 |
| 14 | MF | (Bulgaria) BUL | Iliyan Stefanov | 17 | 1 | 0+12 | 1 | 1+1 | 0 | 0+3 | 0 |
| 15 | MF | (Bulgaria) BUL | Aleksandar Bozhilov | 0 | 0 | 0 | 0 | 0 | 0 | 0 | 0 |
| 16 | FW | (Bulgaria) BUL | Preslav Bachev | 9 | 1 | 0+9 | 1 | 0 | 0 | 0 | 0 |
| 17 | FW | (Brazil) BRA | Everton Bala | 12 | 0 | 8+4 | 0 | 0 | 0 | 0 | 0 |
| 19 | FW | (Morocco) MAR | Bilal Bari | 6 | 0 | 0+6 | 0 | 0 | 0 | 0 | 0 |
| 20 | MF | (Bulgaria) BUL | Asen Chandarov | 31 | 0 | 2+24 | 0 | 1+1 | 0 | 0+3 | 0 |
| 21 | MF | (Bulgaria) BUL | Kristiyan Yovov | 3 | 0 | 0+2 | 0 | 0+1 | 0 | 0 | 0 |
| 22 | DF | (Bulgaria) BUL | Patrik-Gabriel Galchev | 31 | 1 | 17+9 | 1 | 1+1 | 0 | 1+2 | 0 |
| 23 | MF | (Slovakia) SVK | Patrik Myslovič | 14 | 0 | 8+6 | 0 | 0 | 0 | 0 | 0 |
| 24 | DF | (Uruguay) URU | Joaquín Fernández | 3 | 0 | 1+2 | 0 | 0 | 0 | 0 | 0 |
| 33 | DF | (Panama) PAN | José Córdoba | 35 | 0 | 29 | 0 | 0 | 0 | 6 | 0 |
| 50 | DF | (Bulgaria) BUL | Kristian Dimitrov | 30 | 2 | 19+6 | 2 | 1 | 0 | 4 | 0 |
| 77 | DF | (Bulgaria) BUL | Deyvid Mihalev | 3 | 0 | 0+2 | 0 | 0+1 | 0 | 0 | 0 |
| 88 | FW | (Bulgaria) BUL | Marin Petkov | 35 | 8 | 24+7 | 7 | 0+1 | 0 | 1+2 | 1 |
| 97 | MF | (France) FRA | Hassimi Fadiga | 33 | 3 | 16+11 | 2 | 2 | 0 | 0+4 | 1 |
| 99 | GK | (Bulgaria) BUL | Ivan Andonov | 2 | 0 | 2 | 0 | 0 | 0 | 0 | 0 |
Players from the reserve team:
Other players under contract:
| | MF | (Bulgaria) BUL | Andrian Kraev | 25 | 2 | 12+5 | 2 | 2 | 0 | 6 | 0 |
Players away on loan:
| | MF | (Bulgaria) BUL | Antoan Stoyanov | 0 | 0 | 0 | 0 | 0 | 0 | 0 | 0 |
| | MF | (Bulgaria) BUL | Zdravko Dimitrov | 0 | 0 | 0 | 0 | 0 | 0 | 0 | 0 |
| | MF | (Curaçao) CUW | Nathan Holder | 0 | 0 | 0 | 0 | 0 | 0 | 0 | 0 |
Players who left during the season:
| 2 | DF | (France) FRA | Jeremy Petris | 22 | 0 | 16+1 | 0 | 1 | 0 | 4 | 0 |
| 7 | FW | (Brazil) BRA | Ronaldo | 25 | 7 | 17 | 4 | 2 | 1 | 5+1 | 2 |
| 10 | MF | (Bulgaria) BUL | Ivelin Popov | 6 | 0 | 2+2 | 0 | 0 | 0 | 0+2 | 0 |
| 17 | FW | (Brazil) BRA | Welton Felipe | 23 | 6 | 15+1 | 3 | 1 | 1 | 6 | 2 |
| 21 | DF | (Croatia) CRO | Ante Blažević | 0 | 0 | 0 | 0 | 0 | 0 | 0 | 0 |
| 23 | DF | (The Gambia) GAM | Noah Sonko Sundberg | 1 | 0 | 1 | 0 | 0 | 0 | 0 | 0 |
| 30 | MF | (Bulgaria) BUL | Filip Krastev | 0 | 0 | 0 | 0 | 0 | 0 | 0 | 0 |
| 37 | MF | (Brazil) BRA | Darlan | 18 | 1 | 12 | 1 | 1+1 | 0 | 3+1 | 0 |

=== Goalscorers ===
As of 26 May 2024

| Rank | Player | FPL | BC | UECL | Total |
|---|---|---|---|---|---|
| 1 | (Brazil) Ricardinho | 9 | 2 | 0 | 11 |
| 2 | (Spain) Jawad El Jemili | 8 | 0 | 0 | 8 |
| 2 | (Bulgaria) Marin Petkov | 7 | 0 | 1 | 8 |
| 4 | (Brazil) Ronaldo | 4 | 1 | 2 | 7 |
| 5 | (Brazil) Welton Felipe | 3 | 1 | 2 | 6 |
| 6 | (Brazil) Wenderson Tsunami | 4 | 0 | 0 | 4 |
| 7 | (France) Hassimi Fadiga | 2 | 0 | 1 | 3 |
| 7 | (Brazil) Fábio Lima | 3 | 0 | 0 | 3 |
| 9 | (Bulgaria) Kristian Dimitrov | 2 | 0 | 0 | 2 |
| 9 | (Bulgaria) Andrian Kraev | 2 | 0 | 0 | 2 |
| 9 | (Bulgaria) Asen Mitkov | 2 | 0 | 0 | 2 |
| 12 | (Brazil) Darlan | 1 | 0 | 0 | 1 |
| 12 | (Bulgaria) Preslav Bachev | 1 | 0 | 0 | 1 |
| 12 | (Bulgaria) Patrik-Gabriel Galchev | 1 | 0 | 0 | 1 |
| 12 | (Bulgaria) Iliyan Stefanov | 1 | 0 | 0 | 1 |
| Total | | 50 | 4 | 6 | 60 |

=== Clean sheets ===
As of 26 May 2024

| Rank | Goalkeeper | FPL | BC | UECL | Total |
|---|---|---|---|---|---|
| 1 | (Bulgaria) Plamen Andreev | 17 | 0 | 3 | 20 |
| 2 | (Bulgaria) Nikolay Mihaylov | 3 | 0 | 0 | 3 |
| Total | | 20 | 0 | 3 | 23 |

=== Disciplinary record ===
Includes all competitive matches.

| N | P | Nat. | Name | First League | | | Bulgarian Cup | | | Conference League | | | Total | | | Notes |
| N | P | Nat. | Name | Yellow card | Second yellow card | Red card | Yellow card | Second yellow card | Red card | Yellow card | Second yellow card | Red card | Yellow card | Second yellow card | Red card | Notes |
| 5 | DF | (Netherlands) | Kellian van der Kaap | 4 | | | | | | 2 | | | 6 | | | |
| 6 | DF | (Brazil) | Wenderson Tsunami | 7 | | | | | | 3 | | | 10 | | | |
| 8 | MF | (Ghana) | Carlos Ohene | 5 | | | | | | | | | 5 | | | |
| 9 | FW | (Brazil) | Ricardinho | 6 | | | 1 | | | | | | 7 | | | |
| 10 | MF | (Bulgaria) | Asen Mitkov | 5 | | | 1 | | | 1 | | | 7 | | | |
| 11 | FW | (Spain) | Jawad El Jemili | 2 | | | | | | 1 | | | 3 | | | |
| 14 | MF | (Bulgaria) | Iliyan Stefanov | 1 | | | | | 1 | 1 | | | 2 | | 1 | |
| 16 | FW | (Bulgaria) | Preslav Bachev | 1 | | | | | | | | | 1 | | | |
| 17 | FW | (Brazil) | Everton Bala | 1 | | | | | | | | | 1 | | | |
| 19 | FW | (Morocco) | Bilal Bari | 2 | | | | | | | | | 2 | | | |
| 20 | MF | (Bulgaria) | Asen Chandarov | 2 | | 1 | 1 | | | 1 | | | 4 | | 1 | |
| 22 | DF | (Bulgaria) | Patrik-Gabriel Galchev | 3 | | 1 | 1 | | | | | | 4 | | 1 | |
| 33 | DF | (Panama) | José Córdoba | 8 | | 1 | | | | 2 | | | 10 | | 1 | |
| 50 | DF | (Bulgaria) | Kristian Dimitrov | 4 | | | | | | 2 | | | 6 | | | |
| 77 | DF | (Bulgaria) | Deyvid Mihalev | 1 | | | | | | 2 | | | 3 | | | |
| 88 | FW | (Bulgaria) | Marin Petkov | 7 | | | | | | 1 | | | 8 | | | |
| 97 | MF | (France) | Hassimi Fadiga | 1 | | 1 | | | | | | | 1 | | 1 | |
| 99 | GK | (Bulgaria) | Ivan Andonov | 1 | | | | | | 1 | | | 2 | | | |
| | MF | (Bulgaria) | Andrian Kraev | 3 | | | | | | 2 | | | 5 | | | |
| | DF | (France) | Jeremy Petris † | 5 | | | | | | 1 | | | 6 | | | |
| | MF | (Bulgaria) | Ivelin Popov † | 2 | | | | | | | | | 2 | | | |
| | MF | (Brazil) | Darlan † | 1 | | | | | | | | | 1 | | | |
| | FW | (Brazil) | Ronaldo † | | | | | | | 1 | | | 1 | | | |
| | FW | (Brazil) | Welton Felipe † | 5 | | | | | | | | | 5 | | | |

Last updated: 26 May 2024
Source: Soccerway
Only competitive matches
(yellow card) = Number of bookings; (second yellow card) = Number of sending offs after a second yellow card; (red card) = Number of sending offs by a direct red card. ^{†} Player left the club during the season.
