= Ronaldo (footballer, born December 2000) =

Brazilian footballer

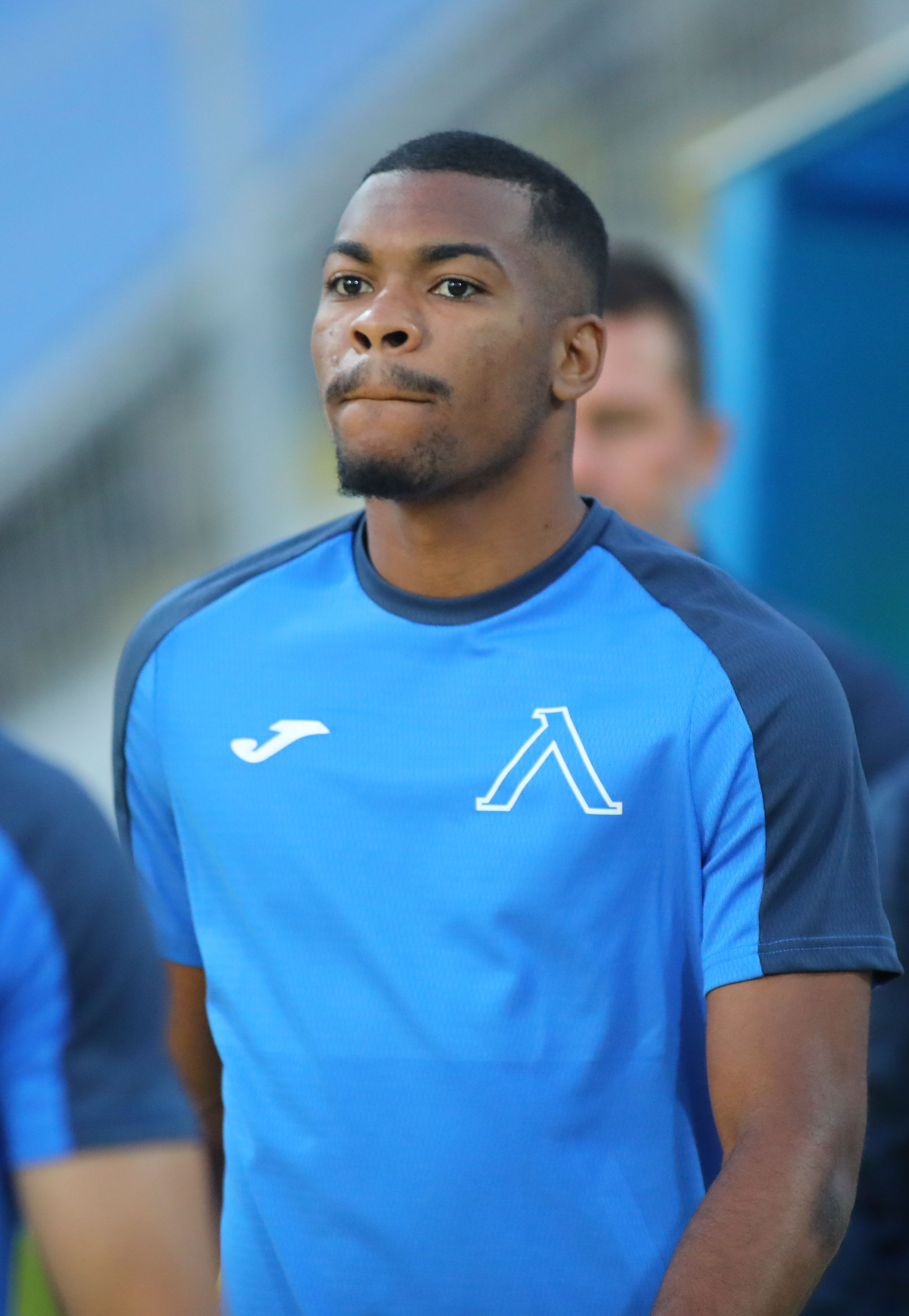
- Ronaldo with Levski in 2022

Personal information
- Full name: Ronaldo Cezar Soares dos Santos
- Date of birth: 7 December 2000 (age 25)
- Place of birth: Rio de Janeiro, Brazil
- Height: 1.77 m (5 ft 10 in)
- Position: Forward

Team information
- Current team: Rostov
- Number: 7

Youth career
- São Caetano
- 2021: Bahia

Senior career*
Years	Team	Apps	(Gls)
2020	São Caetano	22	(3)
2021–2022	Bahia	33	(1)
2022–2024	Levski Sofia	51	(7)
2024–	Rostov	79	(17)
- * Club domestic league appearances and goals as of 20 November 2026

Ronaldo Cezar Soares dos Santos (born 7 December 2000), simply known as Ronaldo, is a Brazilian footballer who plays as a forward for Russian Premier League club Rostov.

== Club career ==
=== São Caetano ===
Born in Rio de Janeiro, Ronaldo was a São Caetano youth graduate. He made his first team debut on 22 January 2020, starting in a 2–3 Campeonato Paulista Série A2 away loss against Penapolense, and scored his first senior goal on 7 March by netting his team's second in a 2–1 home win over Atibaia.

=== Bahia ===
In November 2020, Ronaldo signed for Bahia for the ensuing campaign, being initially assigned to the under-23 squad. He first appeared with the main squad the following 28 July, starting in a 0–2 loss at Atlético Mineiro, for the season's Copa do Brasil.

Ronaldo made his Série A debut on 1 August 2021, coming on as a late substitute for Rodriguinho in a 0–1 home loss against Sport Recife.

=== Levski Sofia ===
On 16 June 2022, Ronaldo moved to Europe, signing a 3-year deal with Bulgarian First League club Levski Sofia.

=== Rostov ===
On 12 January 2024, Ronaldo agreed a move to the Russian Premier League club Rostov.

== Career statistics ==
As of match played 20 November 2026

Club	Season	League			State League		Cup		Continental		Other		Total	
Club	Season	Division	Apps	Goals	Apps	Goals	Apps	Goals	Apps	Goals	Apps	Goals	Apps	Goals
São Caetano	2020	Série D	3	2	19	1	—		—		—		22	3
Bahia	2021	Série A	16	0	6	1	2	0	0	0	1 (Note: Appearance(s) in Copa do Nordeste)	1	25	2
Bahia	2022	Série B	4	0	6	0	1	0	—		8	1	19	1
Bahia	Total		20	0	12	1	3	0	0	0	9	2	44	3
Levski Sofia	2022–23	First League	34	3	—		2	1	4 (Note: Appearance(s) in UEFA Europa Conference League)	1	1 (Note: Appearance(s) in Bulgarian Supercup)	0	41	5
Levski Sofia	2023–24	First League	17	4	—		2	1	6	2	0	0	25	7
Levski Sofia	Total		51	7	0	0	4	2	10	3	1	0	66	12
Rostov	2023–24	Russian Premier League	12	6	—		3	0	—		—		15	6
Rostov	2024–25	Russian Premier League	29	4	—		7	2	—		—		36	6
Rostov	2025–26	Russian Premier League	26	6	—		3	0	—		—		29	6
Rostov	2026–27	Russian Premier League	12	1	—		3	1	—		—		15	2
Rostov	Total		79	17	—		16	3	—		—		95	20
Career total			153	26	31	2	23	5	10	3	10	2	227	38

== Honours ==
São Caetano

- Campeonato Paulista Série A2: 2020

Bahia

- Copa do Nordeste: 2021
