= Ivan Andonov (footballer) =

Bulgarian footballer

Personal information
- Full name: Ivan Georgiev Andonov
- Date of birth: 27 December 2003 (age 22)
- Place of birth: Sofia, Bulgaria
- Height: 1.90 m (6 ft 3 in)
- Position: Goalkeeper

Team information
- Current team: Slavia Sofia
- Number: 99

Youth career
- 2012–2022: Levski Sofia
- 2021–2022: → Fiorentina (loan)

Senior career*
Years	Team	Apps	(Gls)
2022–2024	Levski Sofia II	29	(0)
2022–2024	Levski Sofia	2	(0)
2025–	Slavia Sofia	27	(0)

International career
2019–2020	Bulgaria U17	5	(0)
2021	Bulgaria U19	6	(0)
- * Club domestic league appearances and goals as of 17:13, 8 November 2026 (UTC)

Ivan Georgiev Andonov (Bulgarian: Иван Георгиев Андонов; born 27 December 2003) is a Bulgarian professional footballer who plays as a goalkeeper for First League club Slavia Sofia.

== Club career ==
=== Levski Sofia ===
Andonov joined the youth academy of Levski Sofia at the age of 9 in 2012 and progressed through the various youth categories of the club's academy. On 10 January 2020, he signed his first professional contract, for three years. On 27 January 2021, Andonov was loaned to the youth academy of Serie A side Fiorentina. He was a regular starter throughout the 2021–22 Primavera 1 season, playing 27 league matches.

In June 2022, Andonov returned to Bulgaria and became a regular member of the Levski Sofia II squad in the Third League. On 7 April 2024, he made his First League debut in a 2–0 loss against CSKA Sofia in the Eternal derby of Bulgarian football.

=== Slavia Sofia ===
On 24 February 2025, Andonov was transferred to Slavia Sofia as part of an exchange deal that saw Svetoslav Vutsov go in the opposite direction. He made his debut in a 3–2 league loss against Lokomotiv Sofia on 6 April 2025.

== Career statistics ==
As of match played 5 November 2026

Appearances and goals by club, season and competition
Club	Season	League			National cup		Europe		Other		Total	
Club	Season	Division	Apps	Goals	Apps	Goals	Apps	Goals	Apps	Goals	Apps	Goals
Levski Sofia II	2022–23	Third League	13	0	—		—		—		13	0
Levski Sofia II	2023–24	Third League	15	0	—		—		—		15	0
Levski Sofia II	2024–25	Third League	1	0	—		—		—		1	0
Levski Sofia II	Total		29	0	—		—		—		29	0
Levski Sofia	2022–23	First League	0	0	0	0	0	0	—		0	0
Levski Sofia	2023–24	First League	2	0	0	0	0	0	—		2	0
Levski Sofia	2024–25	First League	0	0	0	0	—		—		0	0
Levski Sofia	Total		2	0	0	0	0	0	—		2	0
Slavia Sofia	2024–25	First League	3	0	0	0	—		—		3	0
Slavia Sofia	2025–26	First League	10	0	0	0	—		—		10	0
Slavia Sofia	2026–27	First League	14	0	0	0	—		—		14	0
Slavia Sofia	Total		27	0	0	0	0	0	—		27	0
Career total			58	0	0	0	0	0	0	0	58	0
