= Matej Marković =

Bosnian footballer

Personal information
- Full name: Matej Marković
- Date of birth: 22 July 1996 (age 30)
- Place of birth: Zagreb, Croatia
- Height: 1.92 m (6 ft 3 1/2 in)
- Position: Goalkeeper

Team information
- Current team: HJK Helsinki
- Number: 44

Youth career
- 2006–2007: Dubrava
- 2008–2010: Zagreb
- 2010: Dubrava
- 2011: Tekstilac Ravnice
- 2011: Radnik Sesvete
- 2012: Croatia Sesvete
- 2012–2015: Zagreb

Senior career*
Years	Team	Apps	(Gls)
2013–2014	Zagreb	1	(0)
2015	Rudeš	0	(0)
2016–2017	HAŠK	13	(0)
2017–2018	Čelik Zenica	19	(0)
2018–2019	Krupa	21	(0)
2019–2020	Sarajevo	0	(0)
2020–2021	Zemplín Michalovce	25	(0)
2022–2023	Levadiakos	29	(0)
2023–2024	Rudeš	24	(0)
2024–2025	Levski Sofia	20	(0)
2025–2026	Vukovar 1991	1	(0)
2026–	HJK Helsinki	20	(0)

International career^{‡}
2017–2018	Bosnia and Herzegovina U21	0	(0)
- * Club domestic league appearances and goals as of 12 November 2026 ‡ National team caps and goals as of 10 November 2017

Matej Marković (born 22 July 1996) is a Croatian professional footballer who plays as a goalkeeper for Veikkausliiga team HJK Helsinki.

== Honours ==
Sarajevo

- Bosnian Premier League: 2019–20

Levadiakos

- Super League 2: 2021–22
