= Oliver Kamdem =

Cameroonian footballer (born 2002)

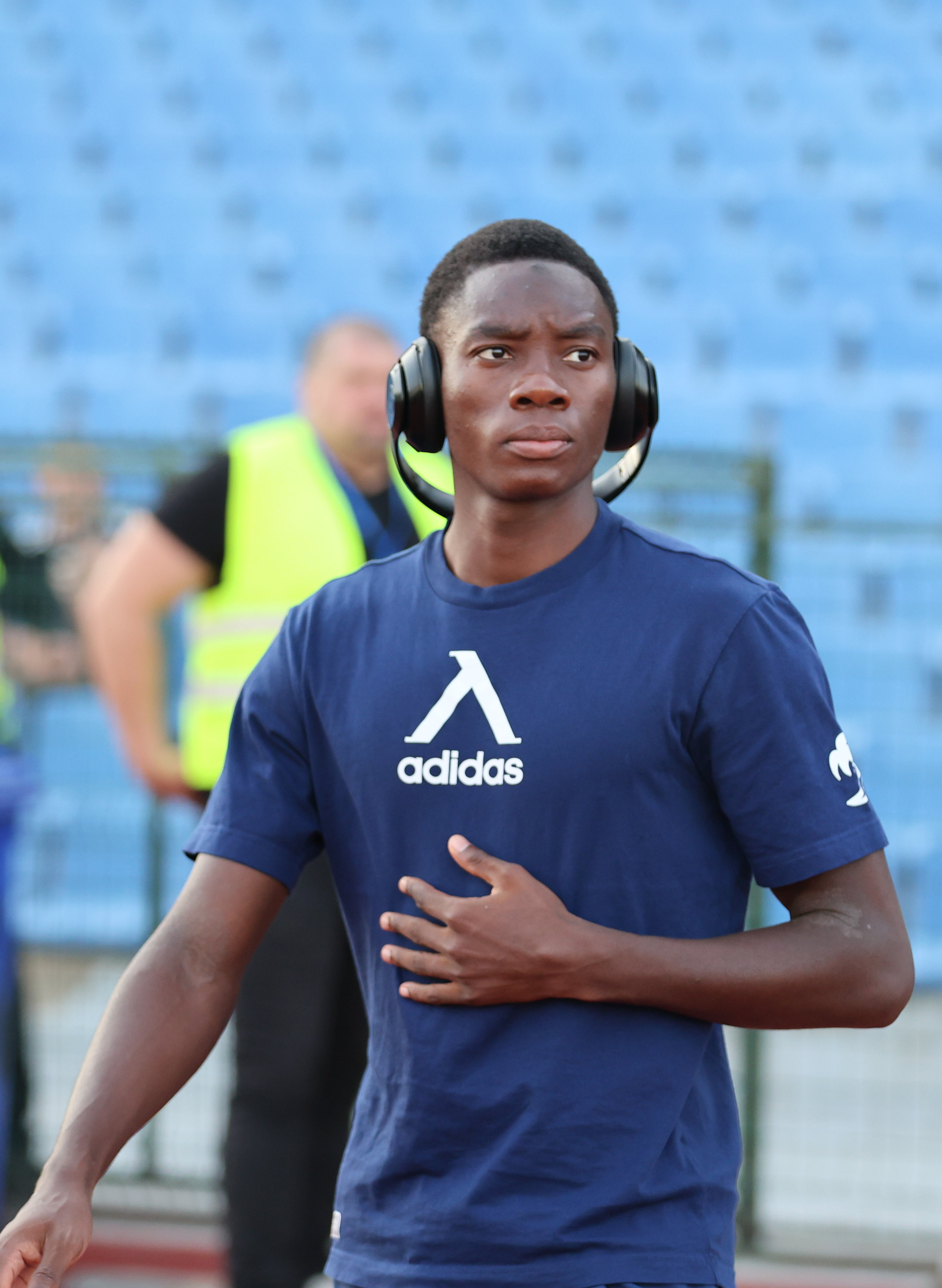

Personal information
- Full name: Wabo Oliver Kamdem
- Date of birth: 15 October 2002 (age 24)
- Place of birth: Marseille, France
- Height: 1.78 m (5 ft 10 in)
- Position: Right-back

Youth career
- Marseille
- –2019: SC Air Bel
- 2019–2021: Clermont

Senior career*
Years	Team	Apps	(Gls)
2020–2023	Clermont B	28	(0)
2021–2023	Clermont	0	(0)
2023–2025	Lokomotiv Plovdiv	41	(1)
2025–2026	Levski Sofia	36	(1)

International career^{‡}
2026–	Cameroon	3	(0)
- * Club domestic league appearances and goals as of 27 October 2026 ‡ National team caps and goals as of 12:39, 22 November 2026 (UTC)

Wabo Oliver Kamdem (born 15 October 2002) is a professional footballer who plays as a right-back. Born in France, he represents the Cameroon national team.

== Career ==
On 18 December 2021, Kamdem made his senior debut for Clermont in a 4–0 Coupe de France victory over Chemin Bas d'Avignon. At the end of the 2022–23 season, he left the club following the expiration of his contract. In September 2023, Kamdem joined Bulgarian club Lokomotiv Plovdiv on a three-year contract. On 14 February 2025, Kamdem was transferred to fellow Bulgarian club Levski Sofia, signing a two-and-a-half-year contract.

On 27 March 2026, Kamdem earned his first cap for Cameroon, appearing as a starter and playing the first 75 minutes in a 1–0 loss against Australia in a FIFA Series match. He conceded a penalty during the second half, which was missed by Ajdin Hrustic.

== Personal life ==
Born in France, Kamdem is of Cameroonian descent.

== Career statistics ==
=== Club ===
As of match played 27 October 2026

Appearances and goals by club, season and competition
Club	Season	League			National cup (Note: Includes Coupe de France, Bulgarian Cup)		Europe		Other		Total	
Club	Season	Division	Apps	Goals	Apps	Goals	Apps	Goals	Apps	Goals	Apps	Goals
Clermont B	2020–21	National 3	2	0	—		—		—		2	0
Clermont B	2021–22	National 3	12	0	—		—		—		12	0
Clermont B	2022–23	National 3	13	0	—		—		—		13	0
Clermont B	Total		27	0	—		—		—		27	0
Clermont	2021–22	Ligue 1	0	0	1	0	—		—		1	0
Lokomotiv Plovdiv	2023–24	First League	25	1	2	0	—		—		27	1
Lokomotiv Plovdiv	2024–25	First League	16	0	1	0	—		—		17	0
Lokomotiv Plovdiv	Total		41	1	3	0	—		—		44	1
Levski Sofia	2024–25	First League	7	1	1	0	—		—		8	1
Levski Sofia	2025–26	First League	27	0	2	0	3 (Note: Appearances in UEFA Europa League)	0	1 (Note: Appearance in Bulgarian Supercup)	0	33	0
Levski Sofia	2026–27	First League	2	0	0	0	2 (Note: Appearances in UEFA Champions League)	0	0	0	4	0
Levski Sofia	Total		36	1	3	0	5	0	1	0	45	1
Career total			104	2	7	0	5	0	1	0	117	2

=== International ===
As of match played 16 November 2026

Appearances and goals by national team and year
National team	Year	Apps	Goals
Cameroon	2026	3	0
Total		3	0

== Honours ==
Levski Sofia

- Bulgarian First League: 2025–26
