= Patrik Myslovič =

Slovak footballer

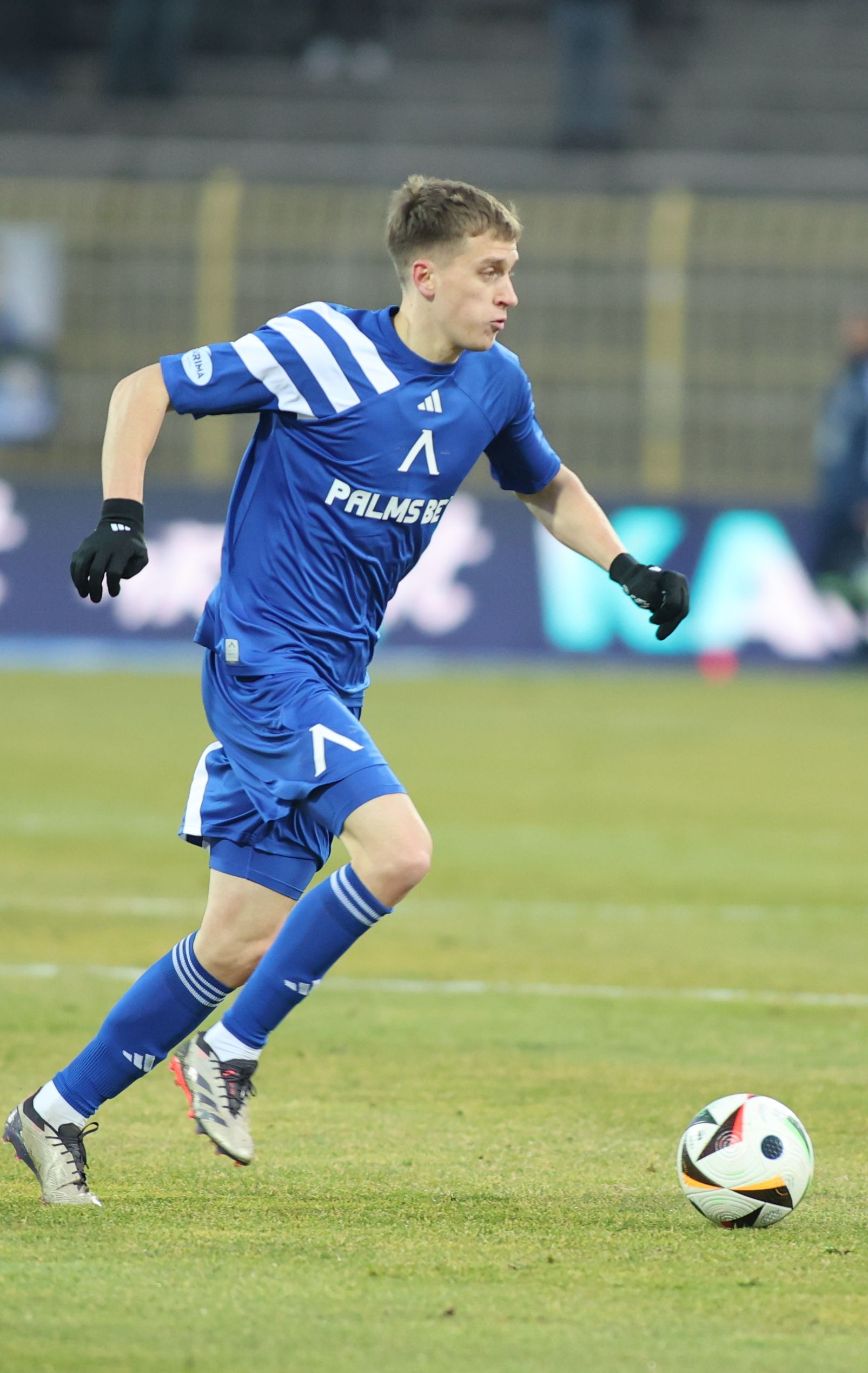

Personal information
- Full name: Patrik Myslovič
- Date of birth: 28 May 2001 (age 25)
- Place of birth: Turčianske Teplice, Slovakia
- Height: 1.80 m (5 ft 11 in)
- Position: Midfielder

Team information
- Current team: Tirana
- Number: 7

Youth career
- 2008–2014: Fomat Martin
- 2014–2018: Žilina

Senior career*
Years	Team	Apps	(Gls)
2019–2022	Žilina B	41	(3)
2019–2024	Žilina	89	(10)
2023	→ Aberdeen (loan)	4	(0)
2024–2025	Levski Sofia	39	(2)
2026–	Tirana	30	(3)

International career^{‡}
- Slovakia U15
2017–2018	Slovakia U17	5	(0)
2018–2020	Slovakia U19	5	(2)
2020–2022	Slovakia U21	7	(0)
2026–	Slovakia	0	(0)
- * Club domestic league appearances and goals as of 29 December 2025 ‡ National team caps and goals as of 14:50, 8 June 2022 (UTC)

Patrik Myslovič (born 28 May 2001) is a Slovak professional footballer who plays as a midfielder for Tirana in Abissnet Superiore.

== Club career ==
=== MŠK Žilina ===
Myslovič joined the Academy of MŠK Žilina in 2014. He made his Fortuna Liga debut for Žilina against Senica on 23 February 2019. Myslovič began the game in the starting line-up but was replaced by Martin Gamboš in the second half. Žilina won the game by a sole first half goal by Michal Tomič. Myslovič scored the winning goal in a 6–2 victory against Zemplin Michalovce, scoring in the 49th minute. On 25 July 2021, he scored his first brace in a 3–0 win against ŠKF Sereď.

==== Aberdeen (loan) ====
Myslovič signed for Scottish club Aberdeen on loan in January 2023, with an exclusive option to buy at the end of the loan spell. He made his debut for the club in a 5–0 loss against Hearts of Midlothian.

=== Levski Sofia ===
On 14 February 2024, Myslovič signed with Bulgarian First League club Levski Sofia on a permanent 2,5-year deal.

== International career ==
In December 2022, Myslovič was first recognised in a Slovak senior national team nomination by Francesco Calzona and was immediately shortlisted for prospective players' training camp at NTC Senec.
