= Carlos Ohene =

Ghanaian footballer

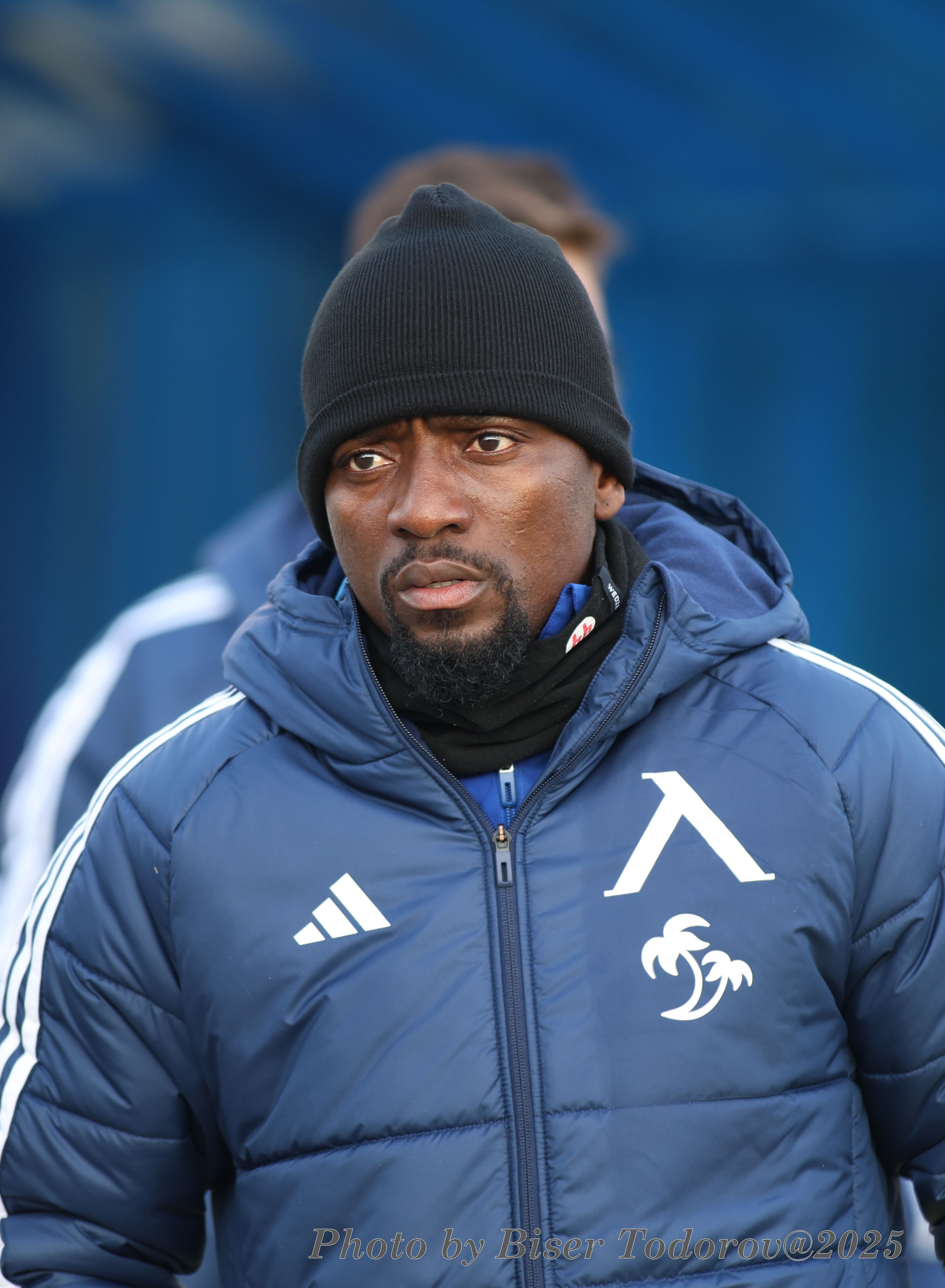
- Ohene in 2025

Personal information
- Full name: Carlos Ohene
- Date of birth: 21 July 1993 (age 33)
- Place of birth: Accra, Ghana
- Height: 1.73 m (5 ft 8 in)
- Position: Midfielder

Youth career
- Madina Youth
- Welfare Stars

Senior career*
Years	Team	Apps	(Gls)
2011–2012	Alki Larnaca	38	(2)
2013–2016	AEL Limassol	64	(2)
2016–2018	Beroe	53	(3)
2018	Ohod	14	(0)
2019–2021	Beroe	33	(1)
2021	Tsarsko Selo	11	(0)
2022–2023	CSKA 1948 II	9	(0)
2022–2023	CSKA 1948	17	(0)
2023–2024	Hebar Pazardzhik	17	(0)
2024–2026	Levski Sofia	60	(1)
- * Club domestic league appearances and goals as of 16 May 2026

Carlos Ohene (born 21 July 1993) is a Ghanaian professional footballer who plays as a midfielder.

== Honours ==
Levski Sofia

- Bulgarian First League: 2025–26
