= Dimitar Tonev =

Bulgarian footballer

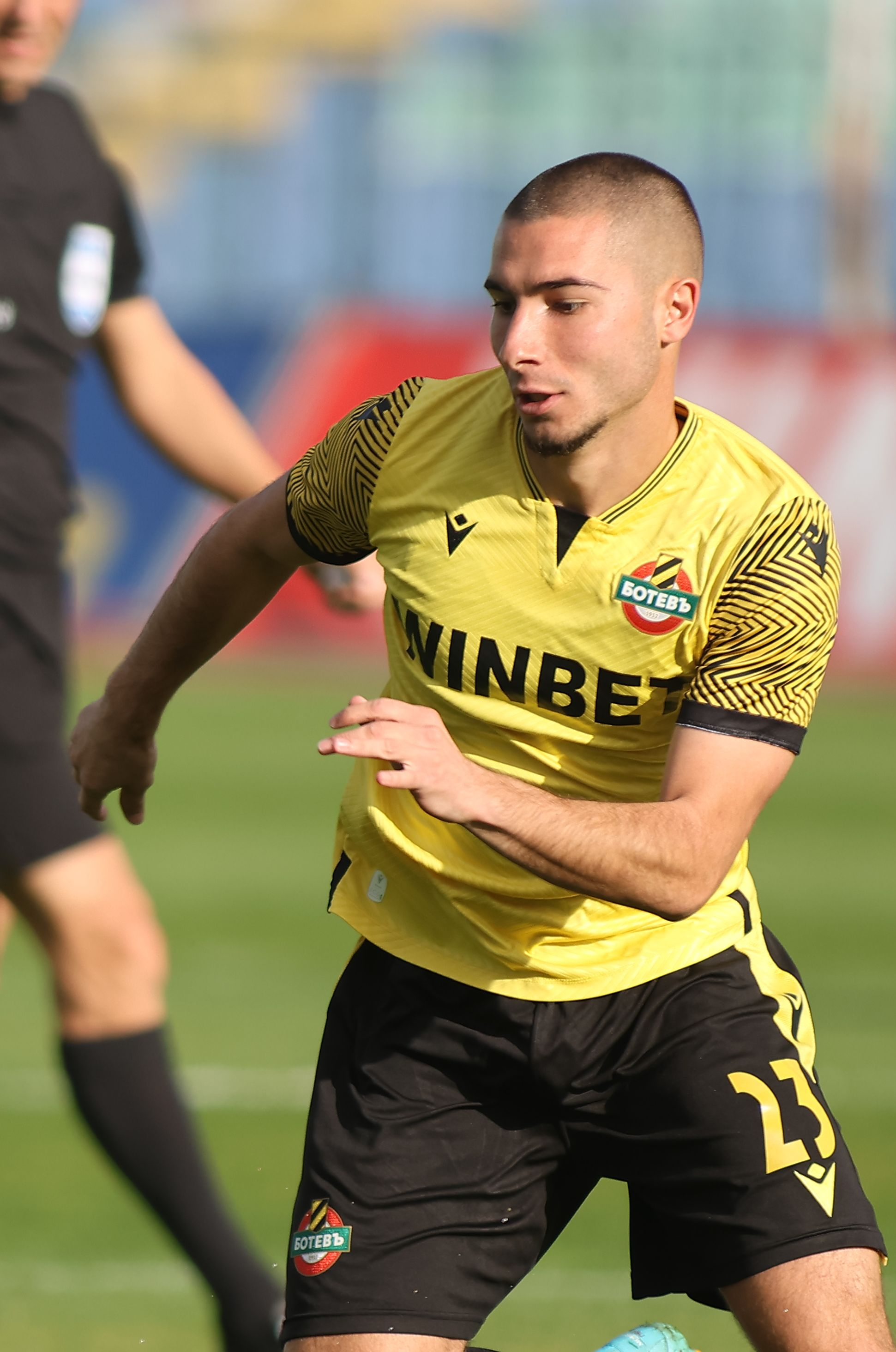
- Tonev in 2022

Personal information
- Full name: Dimitar Dimitrov Tonev
- Date of birth: 15 October 2001 (age 25)
- Place of birth: Plovdiv, Bulgaria
- Height: 1.71 m (5 ft 7 in)
- Position: Midfielder

Team information
- Current team: Botev Plovdiv
- Number: 23

Youth career
- Botev Plovdiv

Senior career*
Years	Team	Apps	(Gls)
2019–2024	Botev Plovdiv	68	(2)
2021–2024	→ Botev Plovdiv II	7	(0)
2023	→ Pirin Blagoevgrad (loan)	10	(0)
2023–2024	→ Krumovgrad (loan)	24	(3)
2025–2026	Cherno More	28	(3)
2026–	Botev Plovdiv	4	(0)

International career^{‡}
2019–2020	Bulgaria U19	3	(1)
2021–2022	Bulgaria U21	5	(2)
- * Club domestic league appearances and goals as of 6 October 2026 ‡ National team caps and goals as of 21:33, 25 March 2022 (UTC)

Dimitar Dimitrov Tonev (Bulgarian: Димитър Тонев; born 15 October 2001) is a Bulgarian professional footballer who plays as a midfielder for First League club Botev Plovdiv.

== Club career ==
On 19 October 2019, four days after his 18th birthday, Tonev made his senior debut for Botev Plovdiv during their league defeat against Ludogorets, playing 77 minutes in a 1–0 loss. On 13 January 2020, he signed his first professional contract with the club. On 4 March 2020, Tonev scored his first competitive goal for Botev in a 1–0 Bulgarian Cup third round victory over Botev Galabovo. In July 2023, he was loaned out to newly promoted Bulgarian team Krumovgrad.
