= Iliyan Stefanov =

Bulgarian footballer

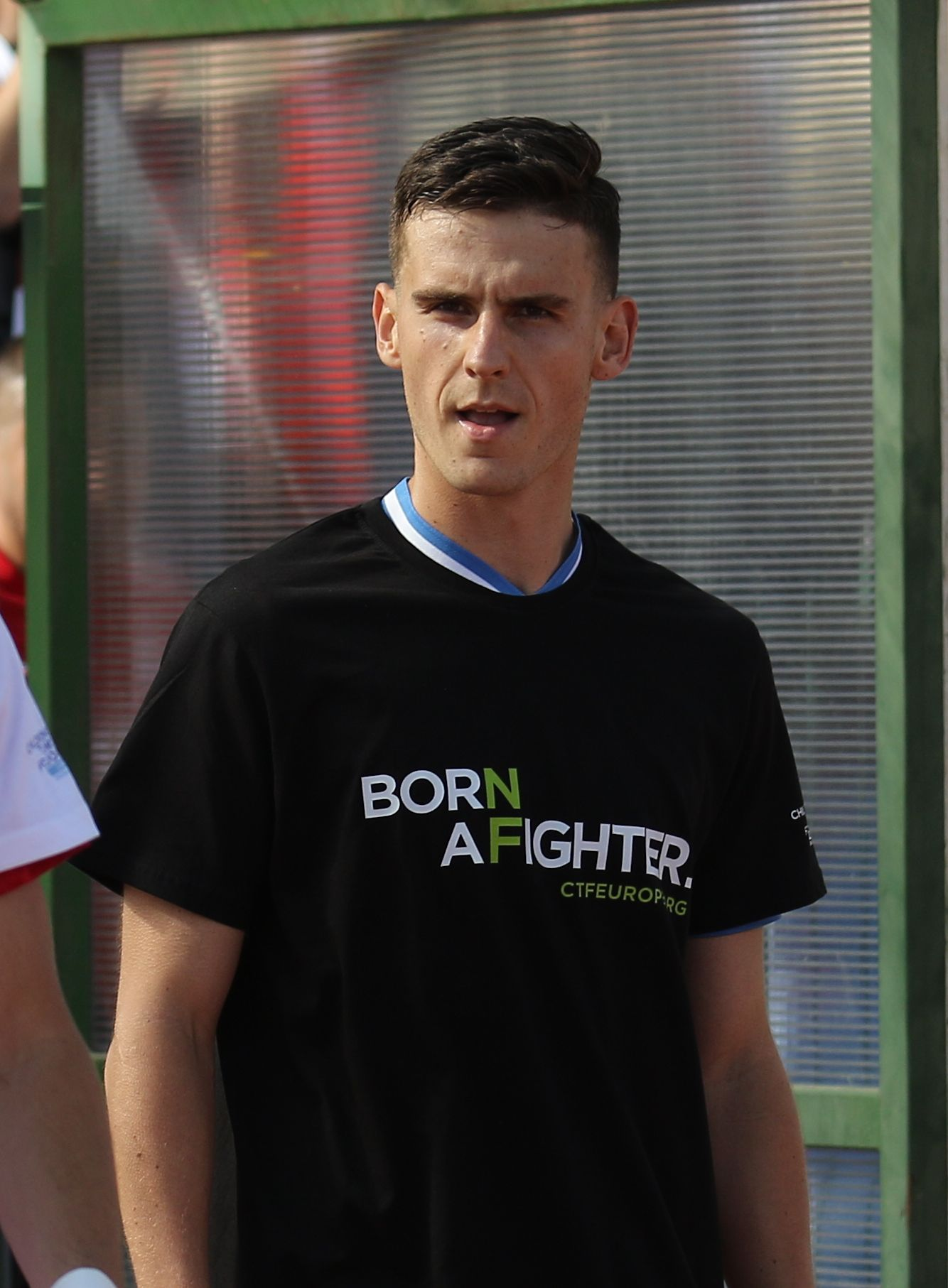
- Stefanov in 2022

Personal information
- Full name: Iliyan Avramov Stefanov
- Date of birth: 20 September 1998 (age 28)
- Place of birth: Sofia, Bulgaria
- Height: 1.86 m (6 ft 1 in)
- Position: Attacking midfielder

Team information
- Current team: Maccabi Herzliya

Youth career
- 2005–2015: Levski Sofia
- 2015–2016: Avellino

Senior career*
Years	Team	Apps	(Gls)
2016–2017	Gozzano	7	(0)
2017–2020	Lokomotiv Sofia	52	(9)
2021–2022	Beroe	23	(0)
2022–2025	Levski Sofia	61	(12)
2025–2026	Slavia Sofia	32	(3)
2026–	Maccabi Herzliya	0	(0)

International career^{‡}
2014–2015	Bulgaria U17	8	(2)
2020	Bulgaria U21	2	(0)
2022–	Bulgaria	8	(2)
- * Club domestic league appearances and goals as of 11 June 2026 ‡ National team caps and goals as of 22:56, 20 June 2023 (UTC)

Iliyan Avramov Stefanov (Bulgarian: Илиян Аврамов Стефанов; born 20 September 1998) is a Bulgarian professional footballer who plays as an attacking midfielder for Maccabi Herzliya and the Bulgaria national team.

== Club career ==
Stefanov started to play football at Levski Sofia. At end of 2015 he moved to Italy to join Avellino's youth academy. Between 2016 and 2017 he appeared in seven games for Gozzano in Serie D.

In 2017, Stefanov returned to Bulgaria to sign for Lokomotiv Sofia. He established himself as an undisputed starter and a top performer for the club in the Second League. His talent attracted the attention of various teams from the Bulgarian top flight and on 23 February 2021, he signed with Beroe.

On 1 March 2022, Stefanov signed with his boyhood club Levski Sofia on a 2-year deal. Оn 15 May 2022, he scored the only goal in the Bulgarian Cup final, leading his club to its first trophy since 2009.

== International career ==
After making his first appearance for the senior side in the 1–1 home draw with North Macedonia on 2 June 2022, Stefanov scored his first goal for Bulgaria in his second cap in a 2–5 defeat to Georgia on 5 June 2022.

== Career statistics ==
=== Club ===
As of 30 May 2025

Appearances and goals by club, season and competition
Club	Season	League			Cup		Continental		Other		Total	
Club	Season	Division	Apps	Goals	Apps	Goals	Apps	Goals	Apps	Goals	Apps	Goals
Gozzano	2016–17	Serie D	7	0	—		—		—		7	0
Lokomotiv Sofia	2017–18	Second League	12	1	0	0	—		—		12	1
Lokomotiv Sofia	2018–19	Second League	13	1	0	0	—		—		13	1
Lokomotiv Sofia	2019–20	Second League	14	2	0	0	—		—		14	2
Lokomotiv Sofia	2020–21	Second League	13	5	0	0	—		—		13	5
Lokomotiv Sofia	Total		52	9	0	0	0	0	0	0	52	9
Beroe Stara Zagora	2020–21	First League	7	0	0	0	—		—		7	0
Beroe Stara Zagora	2021–22	First League	16	0	2	0	—		—		18	0
Beroe Stara Zagora	Total		23	0	2	0	0	0	0	0	25	0
Levski Sofia	2021–22	First League	10	4	3	1	—		—		13	5
Levski Sofia	2022–23	First League	25	4	1	0	2	0	2	0	30	4
Levski Sofia	2023–24	First League	12	1	2	0	3	0	—		17	1
Levski Sofia	2024–25	First League	14	3	2	0	—		—		16	3
Levski Sofia	Total		61	12	8	1	5	0	2	0	76	13
Career total			143	21	10	1	5	0	2	0	161	22

=== International ===
As of match played 20 June 2023

National team	Year	Apps	Goals
Bulgaria	2022	6	2
Bulgaria	2023	2	0
Bulgaria	Total	8	2

Scores and results list Bulgaria's goal tally first.

No.	Date	Venue	Opponent	Score	Result	Competition
1.	5 June 2022	Huvepharma Arena, Razgrad, Bulgaria	Georgia	2–5	2–5	2022–23 UEFA Nations League C
2.	23 September 2022	Huvepharma Arena, Razgrad, Bulgaria	Gibraltar	4–1	5–1	2022–23 UEFA Nations League C

== Honours ==
Levski Sofia

- Bulgarian Cup: 2021–22
