= Preslav Bachev =

Bulgarian footballer

Personal information
- Full name: Preslav Valeriev Bachev
- Date of birth: 14 March 2006 (age 20)
- Place of birth: Ruse, Bulgaria
- Height: 1.87 m (6 ft 2 in)
- Position: Striker

Team information
- Current team: Arda
- Number: 16

Youth career
- Ariston Ruse
- Dunav Ruse
- 2017–2022: Levski Sofia

Senior career*
Years	Team	Apps	(Gls)
2022–2026	Levski Sofia	20	(1)
2022–2025	Levski Sofia II	27	(17)
2025	→ Botev Vratsa (loan)	11	(0)
2025–2026	→ Dunav Ruse (loan)	28	(7)
2026–	Arda	9	(0)

International career^{‡}
2022–	Bulgaria U17	1	(1)
- * Club domestic league appearances and goals as of 6 October 2026 ‡ National team caps and goals as of 08:59, 15 August 2023 (UTC)

Preslav Valeriev Bachev (Bulgarian: Преслав Валериев Бачев; born 14 March 2006) is a Bulgarian professional footballer who plays as a striker for First League club Arda Kardzhali.

== Career ==
Born in Ruse, Bachev started out at local clubs Ariston and Dunav, before moving to Levski Sofia's youth academy at the age of 11. He made his senior debut for Levski on 19 May 2022 in a 2–1 derby win against Slavia Sofia. He scored his maiden goal for Levski Sofia on 13 August 2023 against Botev Vratsa, which won the match for his team. In October 2023, Bachev extended his contract with the team until the summer of 2026. In June 2026, he put pen to paper on a three-year deal with Arda Kardzhali.

== Career statistics ==
As of 20 May 2025

Appearances and goals by club, season and competition
Club	Season	League			Bulgarian Cup		Continental		Other		Total	
Club	Season	Division	Apps	Goals	Apps	Goals	Apps	Goals	Apps	Goals	Apps	Goals
Levski Sofia	2021–22	Bulgarian First League	2	0	0	0	0	0	0	0	2	0
Levski Sofia	2022–23	Bulgarian First League	0	0	0	0	0	0	0	0	0	0
Levski Sofia	2023–24	Bulgarian First League	9	1	0	0	0	0	0	0	9	1
Levski Sofia	2024–25	Bulgarian First League	9	0	2	1	0	0	0	0	11	1
Levski Sofia	Total		20	1	2	1	0	0	0	0	22	2
Botev Vratsa (loan)	2024–25	Bulgarian First League	11	0	3	0	0	0	0	0	14	0
Career total			31	1	5	1	0	0	0	0	36	2
