= Jawad El Jemili =

Spanish footballer (born 2002)

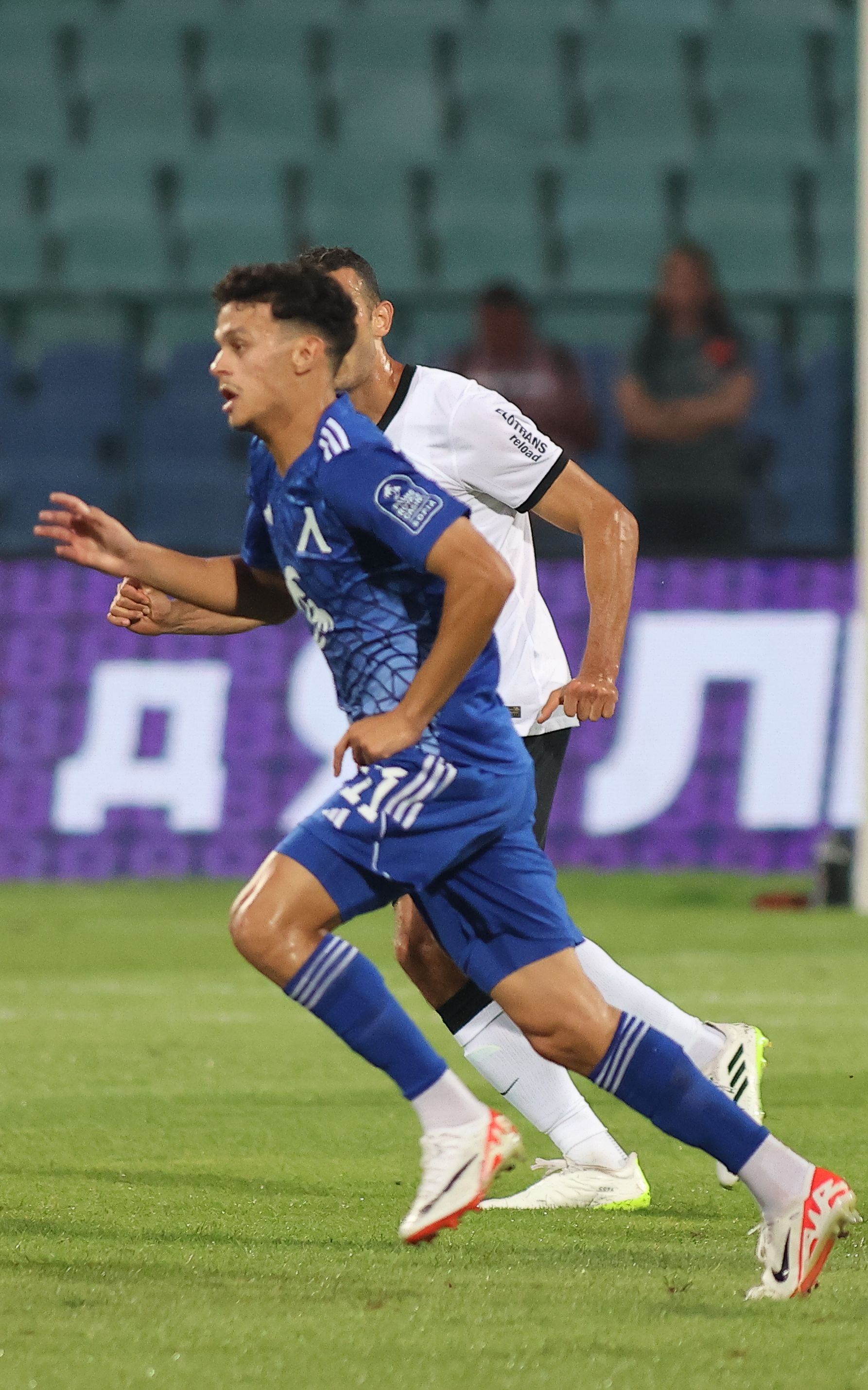
- El Jemili (front) with Levski Sofia in 2023

Personal information
- Full name: Jawad El Jemili Setti
- Date of birth: 4 September 2002 (age 24)
- Place of birth: Barcelona, Spain
- Height: 1.79 m (5 ft 10 in)
- Positions: Attacking midfielder; winger

Team information
- Current team: Al Shahaniya
- Number: 21

Youth career
- –2017: EF Mataró
- 2017–2018: Sant Gabriel
- 2018–2019: Damm
- 2019–2020: Espanyol
- 2020–2021: Damm

Senior career*
| Years | Team | Apps | (Gls) |
| 2021–2023 | Akritas Chlorakas | 19 | (2) |
| 2023–2025 | Levski Sofia | 69 | (14) |
| 2025– | Al Shahaniya | 34 | (4) |
- * Club domestic league appearances and goals as of 14:11, 7 June 2026 (UTC)

Jawad El Jemili Setti (Arabic: جواد الجميلي ستي; born 4 September 2002) is a Spanish professional footballer who plays mainly as an attacking midfielder for Qatar Stars League club Al Shahaniya.

== Career ==
In September 2021, El Jemili signed for Cypriot club Akritas Chlorakas on a free transfer. On 29 August 2022, El Jemili make his debut for the club in a 1–0 win against Omonia. He scored his first goal for Akritas in a 2–1 loss against Nea Salamis Famagusta on a 17 December 2022.

On 22 February 2023, Jawad was announced as a new signing for Levski Sofia. He made his debut on 28 February in the 0–0 draw at home to Ludogorets Razgrad.

== Personal life ==
Born in Barcelona to Moroccan parents, El Jemili is a dual Spanish-Moroccan citizen.

== Career statistics ==
=== Club ===
As of 17 May 2025

Appearances and goals by club, season and competition
| Club | Season | League | | | National cup | | Continental | | Total | |
| Club | Season | Division | Apps | Goals | Apps | Goals | Apps | Goals | Apps | Goals |
|---|---|---|---|---|---|---|---|---|---|---|
| Akritas Chlorakas | 2022–23 | First Division | 19 | 2 | 0 | 0 | — | | 19 | 2 |
| Levski Sofia | 2022–23 | First League | 11 | 0 | 0 | 0 | — | | 11 | 0 |
| Levski Sofia | 2023–24 | First League | 29 | 8 | 0 | 0 | 6 (Note: Appearance(s) in UEFA Europa Conference League) | 0 | 35 | 8 |
| Levski Sofia | 2024–25 | First League | 29 | 6 | 2 | 0 | — | | 31 | 6 |
| Levski Sofia | Total | | 69 | 14 | 2 | 0 | 6 | 0 | 77 | 14 |
| Career total | | | 87 | 16 | 2 | 0 | 6 | 0 | 95 | 16 |
