= 2024–25 PFC CSKA Sofia season =

CSKA Sofia
2024–25 season
- Controlling owner: National Fund for Sport, Culture, Art, and Science
- Manager: Tomislav Stipić (until 28 August 2024); Aleksandar Tomash (since 28 August 2024)
- Parva Liga: 5th
- Bulgarian Cup: Runner-up
- Top goalscorer: League: Goduine Koyalipou (14); All: Goduine Koyalipou (15)
- Average home league attendance: 3,943
Home colours	Away colours	Third colours
- All statistics correct as of 31 May 2025.

The 2024–25 season was CSKA Sofia's 76th season in the Parva Liga (the top flight of Bulgarian football) and their ninth consecutive participation after their administrative relegation to the third division due to mounting financial troubles. In addition to the domestic league, CSKA Sofia participated in this season's edition of the Bulgarian Cup. For the first time since 2016 the club did not play in a UEFA competition.

== Players ==
=== Squad information ===
N	Pos.	Nat.	Name	Age	Since	App	Goals	Ends	Transfer fee	Notes
1	GK	(Brazil)	Gustavo Busatto	33	2019	197	0	2026	Free	
2	DF	(Bulgaria)	Lachezar Ivanov	19	2024	0	0	2028	Youth system	
3	DF	(The Gambia)	Sainey Sanyang	21	2023	37	2	2028	€100,000	
4	DF	(Spain)	Adrián Lapeña	28	2024 (Winter)	21	0	2028	€700,000	
5	DF	(Kosovo)	Lumbardh Dellova	25	2024	36	2	2027	€350,000	
6	DF	(Scotland)	Liam Cooper	32	2024	25	1	2026	Free	
7	MF	(Norway)	Olaus Skarsem	25	2023 (Winter)	47	4	2026	€500,000	
8	MF	(Bulgaria)	Stanislav Shopov	22	2022	106	10	2025	Free	
9	FW	(Kosovo)	Zymer Bytyqi	27	2024	19	5	2026	Free	
10	MF	(Norway)	Jonathan Lindseth	28	2022	116	14	2025	€500,000	
11	FW	(Guadeloupe)	Matthias Phaëton	24	2023	67	10	2027	€2,000,000	
12	GK	(Bulgaria)	Marin Orlinov	28	2023	0	0	2025	Free	
13	DF	(Colombia)	Brayan Córdoba	24	2023	39	0	2027	€1,180,000	
15	MF	(France)	Thibaut Vion	30	2020	172	7	2027	Free	
16	MF	(Bulgaria)	Georgi Chorbadzhiyski	19	2023	20	1	2028	Youth system	
18	DF	(Luxembourg)	Mica Pinto	31	2024	26	1	2026	Free	
19	DF	(Bulgaria)	Ivan Turitsov	23	2018	203	7	2026	Youth system	
20	DF	(Bulgaria)	Martin Stoychev	20	2023 (Winter)	5	0	2027	Undisclosed	
21	GK	(Belarus)	Fyodor Lapoukhov	21	2024 (Winter)	14	0	2028	€650,000	
22	MF	(Democratic Republic of the Congo)	Jason Lokilo	25	2024	25	1	2027	€400,000	
23	MF	(Bulgaria)	Ilian Antonov	19	2022	9	0	2026	Youth system	
24	MF	(Bulgaria)	Yulian Iliev	19	2024	2	0	2028	Youth system	
25	GK	(Bulgaria)	Ivan Dyulgerov	24	2024	19	0	2027	Free	
26	MF	(Colombia)	Marcelino Carreazo	24	2022	97	11	2025	€100,000	
28	FW	(Cyprus)	Ioannis Pittas	27	2024 (Winter)	22	10	2028	€1,200,000	
29	FW	(Bulgaria)	Ivan Tasev	21	2024	14	2	2026	Free	
30	MF	(Bulgaria)	Petko Panayotov	18	2024	24	1	2027	Youth system	
45	FW	(Belgium)	Aaron Leya Iseka	26	2024	22	1	2027	€1,200,000	
73	MF	(Bulgaria)	Ilian Iliev	24	2024	34	3	2026	Free	
91	FW	(Bulgaria)	Yoan Bornosuzov	20	2024	6	0	2027	Free	
99	MF	(Cameroon)	James Eto'o	23	2024	31	1	2027	€1,000,000	

- Last updated: 31 May 2025
- Source: Players transfer and Wikipedia players' articles
- Ordered by squad number.

== Transfers ==
=== In ===
No.	Pos.	Nat.	Name	Age	EU	Moving from	Type	Transfer window	Ends	Transfer fee	Source
29	FW	(Bulgaria)	Ivan Tasev	21	EU	(Bulgaria) Pirin	Transfer	Summer	2028	Free	dsport.bg
22	DF	(Bulgaria)	Asen Donchev	22	EU	(Bulgaria) Pirin	Loan return	Summer	2026	Free	dsport.bg
—	DF	(Bulgaria)	Aleksandar Buchkov	20	EU	(Bulgaria) Lovech	Loan return	Summer	2027	Free	dsport.bg
31	DF	(Bulgaria)	Rosen Marinov	19	EU	(Bulgaria) Lovech	Loan return	Summer	2028	Free	dsport.bg
18	FW	(Bulgaria)	Simeon Aleksandrov	20	EU	(Bulgaria) Septemvri Sofia	Loan return	Summer	2025	Free	dsport.bg
28	FW	(Bulgaria)	Mark-Emilio Papazov	20	EU	(Bulgaria) Hebar	Loan return	Summer	2026	Free	dsport.bg
25	GK	(Bulgaria)	Ivan Dyulgerov	24	EU	(Bulgaria) Cherno More	Transfer	Summer	2027	Free	cska.bg
5	DF	(Kosovo)	Lumbardh Dellova	25	Non-EU	(Kosovo) Ballkani	Transfer	Summer	2027	€350,000	cska.bg
91	FW	(Bulgaria)	Yoan Bornosuzov	20	EU	(Italy) Genoa	Transfer	Summer	2028	Free	cska.bg
2	DF	(Bulgaria)	Lachezar Ivanov	19	EU	Youth team	Promoted	Summer	2028	Free	cska.bg
24	MF	(Bulgaria)	Yulian Iliev	19	EU	Youth team	Promoted	Summer	2028	Free	cska.bg
30	MF	(Bulgaria)	Petko Panayotov	18	EU	Youth team	Promoted	Summer	2028	Free	cska.bg
22	MF	(Democratic Republic of the Congo)	Jason Lokilo	25	EU	(England) Hull City	Transfer	Summer	2027	€400,000	cska.bg
77	FW	(Central African Republic)	Goduine Koyalipou	24	EU	(Belgium) Beveren	Transfer	Summer	2027	€1,000,000	cska.bg
18	DF	(Luxembourg)	Mica Pinto	31	EU	(Netherlands) Vitesse	Transfer	Summer	2027	Free	cska.bg
99	MF	(Cameroon)	James Eto'o	23	EU	(Bulgaria) Botev Plovdiv	Transfer	Summer	2027	€1,000,000	cska.bg
9	FW	(Kosovo)	Zymer Bytyqi	27	EU	(Turkey) Antalyaspor	Transfer	Summer	2027	Free	cska.bg
73	MF	(Bulgaria)	Ilian Iliev	25	EU	(Cyprus) Apollon Limassol	Transfer	Summer	2026	Free	cska.bg
45	FW	(Belgium)	Aaron Leya Iseka	27	EU	(Greece) OFI	Transfer	Summer	2027	€1,200,000	cska.bg
6	DF	(Scotland)	Liam Cooper	33	Non-EU	(England) Leeds United	Transfer	Summer	2026	Free	bbc.co.uk
—	GK	(Bulgaria)	Dimitar Evtimov	30	EU	(Cyprus) Karmiotissa	Loan return	Summer	2025	Free	topsport.bg
21	GK	(Belarus)	Fyodor Lapoukhov	21	Non-EU	(Belarus) Dinamo Minsk	Transfer	Winter	2028	€650,000	cska.bg
4	DF	(Spain)	Adrián Lapeña	28	EU	(Spain) Córdoba	Transfer	Winter	2027	€700,000	cska.bg
28	FW	(Cyprus)	Ioannis Pittas	28	EU	(Sweden) AIK Fotboll	Transfer	Winter	2028	€1,200,000	cska.bg

=== Out ===
No.	Pos.	Nat.	Name	Age	EU	Moving to	Type	Transfer window	Transfer fee	Source
—	FW	(Ghana)	Bismark Charles	22	Non-EU	(Albania) Skënderbeu	Released	Summer	Free	cska.bg
—	GK	(Bulgaria)	Aleks Bozhev	18	EU	(Bulgaria) CSKA 1948	End of contract	Summer	Free	dsport.bg
2	DF	(Netherlands)	Jurgen Mattheij	31	EU	(Netherlands) Excelsior	End of contract	Summer	Free	dsport.bg
4	DF	(Netherlands)	Menno Koch	29	EU	(Norway) Sarpsborg 08	End of contract	Summer	Free	dsport.bg
9	FW	(Brazil)	Fernando Karanga	32	Non-EU	(China) Dalian Yingbo	End of contract	Summer	Free	dsport.bg
22	DF	(Luxembourg)	Enes Mahmutović	27	EU	(Netherlands) NAC Breda	End of contract	Summer	Free	dsport.bg
30	FW	(Colombia)	Danilo Asprilla	35	Non-EU	(Saudi Arabia) Al Safa	End of contract	Summer	Free	dsport.bg
27	MF	(Serbia)	Lazar Tufegdžić	27	Non-EU	(Serbia) Čukarički	Released	Summer	Free	cska.bg
25	GK	(Bulgaria)	Dimitar Evtimov	30	EU	(Cyprus) Karmiotissa	Loan	Summer	Free	cska.bg
22	DF	(Bulgaria)	Asen Donchev	22	EU	(Bulgaria) Cherno More	Transfer	Summer	Free	dsport.bg
18	MF	(Bulgaria)	Simeon Aleksandrov	20	EU	(Bulgaria) CSKA 1948 II	Released	Summer	Free	topsport.bg
—	DF	(Netherlands)	Bradley de Nooijer	27	EU	(Romania) Gloria Buzău	Released	Winter	Free	cska.bg
21	MF	(Central African Republic)	Amos Youga	31	EU	(Hungary) Debreceni	Released	Winter	Free	cska.bg
77	FW	(Central African Republic)	Goduine Koyalipou	24	EU	(France) Lens	Transfer	Winter	€2,000,000	cska.bg
14	MF	(Norway)	Tobias Heintz	26	EU	(Sweden) IFK Göteborg	Released	Winter	Free	cska.bg
4	DF	(Bulgaria)	Hristiyan Petrov	22	EU	(Netherlands) Heerenveen	Transfer	Winter	€500,000	cska.bg
28	FW	(Bulgaria)	Mark-Emilio Papazov	21	EU	(Bulgaria) Botev Vratsa	Loan	Winter	Free	dsport.bg
17	DF	(Austria)	Emanuel Šakić	33	EU	(Cyprus) Enosis Neon Paralimni	Released	Winter	Free	cska.bg
—	GK	(Bulgaria)	Dimitar Evtimov	30	EU	(Bulgaria) Botev Vratsa	Loan	Winter	Free	cska.bg

== Pre-season and friendlies ==
Win Draw Loss Fixtures

=== Pre-season ===
22 June 2024 Friendly	CSKA	2−0	Belasitsa	Pancharevo, Bulgaria
11:00 UTC+3	Heintz 7'; Aleksandrov 75'	Report		Stadium: Sporten kompleks Pancharevo; Attendance: 200; Referee: Vasimir El-Hatib (Sofia)

26 June 2024 Friendly	CSKA	2−0	Krumovgrad	Bansko, Bulgaria
17:30 UTC+3	Tasev 78'; Tsekov 90'	Report		Stadium: Sporten kompleks Evima

29 June 2024 Friendly	CSKA	2−1	(Romania) FC Politehnica Iași	Bansko, Bulgaria
17:30 UTC+3	Phaëton (penalty missed) 14', 39'; Nikolov 67'	Report	Samayoa 75'	Stadium: Sporten kompleks Evima; Referee: Ivo Andreev (Sofia)

1 July 2024 Friendly	CSKA	3−0	Beroe	Bansko, Bulgaria
18:00 UTC+3	Lindseth 13'; Heintz 17'; Nikolov 64'	Report		Stadium: Sporten kompleks Evima

5 July 2024 Friendly	CSKA	2−1	(Israel) Maccabi Petah Tikva	Bansko, Bulgaria
11:30 UTC+3	Lindseth 34'; Heintz 52' (pen.)	Report	Altoury 76'	Stadium: Sporten kompleks Evima

5 July 2024 Friendly	CSKA	1−0	(Serbia) Radnički Niš	Bansko, Bulgaria
17:30 UTC+3	Papazov 82'	Report		Stadium: Sporten kompleks Evima

14 July 2024 Friendly	CSKA	1−0	(Kosovo) Gjilani	Sofia, Bulgaria
18:00 UTC+3	Heintz 58' (pen.)	Report		Stadium: Natsionalen stadion Vasil Levski; Attendance: 3,000; Referee: Ivo Andreev (Sofia)

=== Mid-season ===
10 January 2025 Friendly	CSKA	v	Sportist	Pancharevo, Bulgaria
11:00 UTC+2		Report		Stadium: Sporten kompleks Pancharevo
Note: The game was played in two halves of 30 minutes each.

15 January 2025 Friendly	CSKA	0–1	(Ukraine) Shakhtar Donetsk	Aksu, Turkey
12:00 UTC+2	Phaëton (yellow card) 82'	Report	Tsukanov 75'	Stadium: Titanic Mardan Sport Center

19 January 2025 Friendly	CSKA	2–1	(Hungary) Győri ETO	Serik, Turkey
16:00 UTC+2	Iseka 51' (pen.); Lokilo 67'	Report	Benbouali 49'	Stadium: Calista Sport Center

23 January 2025 Friendly	CSKA	v	(Poland) Widzew Łódź	Serik, Turkey
16:00 UTC+2		Report		Stadium: Calista Sport Center

23 January 2025 Friendly	CSKA	3–0	(South Korea) Gangwon	Serik, Turkey
14:30 UTC+2	Iliev 40'; Kim 45' (o.g.); Shopov 84' (pen.)	Report		Stadium: Calista Sport Center

27 January 2025 Friendly	CSKA	4–1	(Latvia) Liepāja	Aksu, Turkey
16:00 UTC+2	Chorbadzhiyski 41'; Shopov 49', 76'; Iseka 64'	Report	Leidsman 69'	Stadium: Miracle Sport Center

2 February 2025 Friendly	CSKA	4–0	Belasitsa	Pancharevo, Bulgaria
14:30 UTC+2	Vion 42'; Shopov 67', 90+1' (pen.); Panayotov 83'	Report		Stadium: Sporten kompleks Pancharevo

== Competitions ==
=== Overview ===
Competition	First match	Last match	Starting round	Final position	Record							
Competition	First match	Last match	Starting round	Final position	Pld	W	D	L	GF	GA	GD	Win %
Parva Liga	19 July 2024	31 May 2025	Matchday 1	5th place	37	19	9	9	59	29	+30	51.35
Bulgarian Cup	29 October 2024	22 May 2025	First round	Runner-up	6	4	1	1	11	5	+6	66.67
Total					43	23	10	10	70	34	+36	53.49

Source: Competitions

=== Parva Liga ===
==== Regular stage ====
===== League table =====
Pos	Team	Pld	W	D	L	GF	GA	GD	Pts	Qualification
5	Botev Plovdiv	30	14	7	9	32	31	+1	49	Qualification for the Conference League group
6	Spartak Varna	30	14	6	10	39	38	+1	48	Qualification for the Conference League group
7	CSKA Sofia	30	13	8	9	40	27	+13	47	Qualification for the Conference League group
8	Beroe	30	12	6	12	34	29	+5	42 (Note: Head-to-head away goals: Beroe 1; Slavia Sofia 0.)	Qualification for the Conference League group
9	Slavia Sofia	30	12	6	12	43	42	+1	42	Qualification for the Relegation group

Source: soccerway, Bulgarian Football
Rules for classification: 1) Points; 2) Head-to-head points; 3) Head-to-head goal difference; 4) Head-to-head goals scored; 5) Head-to-head away goals scored (only if two teams); 6) Goal difference; 7) Goals scored; 8) Fairplay ranking; 9) Draw

===== Results summary =====
Overall								Home						Away					
Pld	W	D	L	GF	GA	GD	Pts	W	D	L	GF	GA	GD	W	D	L	GF	GA	GD
30	13	8	9	40	27	+13	47	7	5	3	23	14	+9	6	3	6	17	13	+4

Source: See results

===== Results by round =====
Round	1	2	3	4	5	6	7	8	9	10	11	12	13	14	15	16	17	18	19	20	21	22	23	24	25	26	27	28	29	30
Ground	A	H	A	A	H	A	H	A	H	A	H	A	H	A	H	H	A	H	H	A	H	A	H	A	H	A	H	A	H	A
Result	L	W	L	W	L	L	L	L	W	D	L	W	W	D	D	D	W	W	D	L	W	W	D	W	D	W	W	D	W	L
Position	13	8	11	9	10	12	12	14	12	12	13	8	8	8	8	8	8	8	8	9	8	8	8	8	7	6	6	7	7	7

Source: See Results
A = Away; H = Home; W = Win; D = Draw; L = Loss

===== Results =====
21 July 2024 1	Ludogorets	1−0	CSKA	Razgrad
21:15 UTC+3	Verdon (yellow card) 33'; Petrov 53' (o.g.)	Report	Heintz (penalty missed) 34'; Sanyang (yellow card) 41'; Vion (yellow card) 45+5'	Stadium: Huvepharma Arena; Attendance: 5,774 (Note: Due to the crowd disturbances in the playoff game against CSKA 1948 last season, CSKA has been penalised to play under closed doors for 3 home games with additional ban to not have their supporters for 2 away games. Further 2 home games will be played under partial closure, where the club will not allow fans in the CSKA ultras sector.); Referee: Nikola Popov (Sofia); Man of the Match: Sergio Padt

27 July 2024 2	CSKA	3−1	Hebar	Sofia
19:00 UTC+3	Shopov 18'; Carreazo 43'; Chorbadzhiyski 81'	Report	Makni 83'	Stadium: Natsionalen stadion Vasil Levski (Note: From the spring of 2024 CSKA plays their home games at Natsionalen stadion Vasil Levski, Sofia, instead of their regular stadium Stadion Balgarska Armia, Sofia, which is undergoing a major reconstruction.); Attendance: 0 Referee: Ivo Andreev (Sofia); Man of the Match: Georgi Chorbadzhiyski

3 August 2024 3	Spartak	3−0	CSKA	Varna
19:00 UTC+3	Ahmedov 14', 39'; Konate (yellow card) 43'; Dyulgerov 59' (o.g.); Granchov (yellow card) 63'; Mitev (yellow card) 86'; Dimitrov (yellow card) 90+2'	Report	Vion (yellow card) 47'; Turitsov (yellow card) 66'	Stadium: Stadion Spartak; Attendance: 5,987; Referee: Radoslav Gidzhenov (Plovdiv); Man of the Match: Ahmed Ahmedov

17 August 2024 5	CSKA	0−1	Slavia	Sofia
19:00 UTC+3	Phaëton (yellow card) 45+2'	Report	Minchev 13' (pen.); Jelenković (yellow card) 15'; Chunchukov (yellow card) 64'; Georgiev (yellow card) 70'	Stadium: Natsionalen stadion Vasil Levski; Attendance: 400 (Note: Slavia was allowed to sell up to 200 tickets for the guest sector in line with competition regulations. CSKA were allowed to let minors as spectators for free in the stadium.); Referee: Volen Chinkov (Sofia); Man of the Match: Ivan Minchev

24 August 2024 6	Arda	2−1	CSKA	Kardzhali
19:00 UTC+3	Offor 42'; Tilev 53'; Gospodinov (yellow card) 90+4'	Report	Carreazo (yellow card) 20'; Phaëton (yellow card) 55'; Koyalipou 85'; Córdoba (yellow card) 90'	Stadium: Arena Arda; Attendance: 3,896; Referee: Vasimir El-Hatib (Sofia); Man of the Match: Chinonso Offor

30 August 2024 7	CSKA	0−1	Botev Plovdiv	Sofia
21:30 UTC+3	Turitsov (yellow card) 55'; Heintz (yellow card) 77'; Lokilo (yellow card) 90+2'	Report	Eto'o (yellow card) 21'; Balogiannis (yellow card) 23'; Nwachukwu (yellow card) 52'; Ukaki 57', (yellow card) 67'; Bernat (yellow card) 64'	Stadium: Stadion Lokomotiv (Note: The game has been moved to Stadion Lokomotiv in Sofia, as Natsionalen stadion Vasil Levski will be used for an Ed Sheeran concert.); Attendance: 0 Referee: Valentin Zhelezov (Burgas); Man of the Match: Ehije Ukaki

16 September 2024 12	Lokomotiv Sofia	0−3	CSKA	Sofia
19:45 UTC+3	Nenov (yellow card) 23'; Pitsolis (yellow card) 83'	Report	Lindseth 8'; Phaëton 17'; Koyalipou 59'; Eto'o (yellow card) 65'; Córdoba (yellow card) 69'	Stadium: Stadion Lokomotiv; Attendance: 3,490; Referee: Nikola Popov (Sofia); Man of the Match: Goduine Koyalipou

21 September 2024 9	CSKA	1−0	Beroe	Blagoevgrad (Note: The game has been moved to Stadion Hristo Botev in Blagoevgrad, as Natsionalen stadion Vasil Levski will undergo pitch renovation.)
17:30 UTC+3	I. Iliev (yellow card) 31'; Koyalipou 45+4' (pen.)	Report	Chacartegui (yellow card) 64'; Acciari (yellow card) 90+9'	Stadium: Stadion Hristo Botev; Attendance: 4,432; Referee: Dimitar Dimitrov (Sofia); Man of the Match: James Eto'o

28 September 2024 10	Cherno More	0−0	CSKA	Varna
20:00 UTC+3	Dudu (yellow card) 82'	Report	Iseka (yellow card) 70'	Stadium: Stadion Ticha; Referee: Georgi Ginchev (Veliko Tarnovo); Man of the Match: Plamen Iliev

5 October 2024 11	CSKA	0−1	Septemvri	Sofia
17:30 UTC+3	Eto'o (yellow card) 55'	Report	Mitkov (yellow card) 32' (yellow-red card) 87'; Fourrier 38', (yellow card) 39'; Polendakov (yellow card) 45+7'; Sheytanov (yellow card) 85'	Stadium: Natsionalen stadion Vasil Levski; Attendance: 2,790; Referee: Stoyan Arsov (Sofia); Man of the Match: Asen Chandarov

19 October 2024 8	Levski	1−0	CSKA	Sofia
15:45 UTC+3	Sangaré (yellow card) 45+7'; Makoun 86', (yellow card) 88'; Kolev (yellow card) 89'	Report	Dellova (yellow card) 54'; Lindseth (yellow card) 61'; Pinto (yellow card) 80'; Turitsov (yellow card) 84'; Carreazo (yellow card) 90+1'; Busatto (yellow card) FT	Stadium: Natsionalen stadion Vasil Levski; Attendance: 31,948; Referee: Dragomir Draganov (Varna); Man of the Match: Christian Makoun
Note: The game was originally scheduled for the period between 13 and 16 September, but it would not have taken place at the Natsionalen stadion Vasil Levski due to an Andrea Bocelli concert on it. For that reason the technical committee of the BFU decided on 21 August to schedule the game for that period, but it should take place on Levski's own stadium, Stadion Georgi Asparuhov without the presence of away fans. CSKA appealed the decision and their request for a revision has been granted by the appeals committee on 26 August. Three days later the appeals committee met representatives of the two clubs, the police, Sofia municipality, and the sports ministry, and decided to swap the dates of the 8th and 12th round in order to allow the derby to be played at Natsionalen stadion Vasil Levski with fans of both clubs present.

24 October 2024 13	CSKA	2−0	Botev Vratsa	Sofia
17:30 UTC+3	Koyalipou 42'; Phaëton 80'; Cooper (yellow card) 90+2'	Report	Lozev (yellow card) 66'; Georgiev (yellow card) 78'	Stadium: Natsionalen stadion Vasil Levski; Referee: Stanimir Trenchev (Sofia); Man of the Match: Stanislav Shopov

2 November 2024 14	Lokomotiv Plovdiv	2−2	CSKA	Plovdiv
14:30 UTC+2	Iliev 15' (pen.); Perea 50', (yellow card) 66'; Lukov (yellow card) 90+6'	Report	Koyalipou 34'; Bytyqi 90+2'	Stadium: Stadion Lokomotiv; Attendance: 5,355; Referee: Vasil Minev (Sofia); Man of the Match: Juan Perea

7 November 2024 4	CSKA 1948	1−3	CSKA	Bistritsa
17:30 UTC+2	Cooper 5' (o.g.); Serdyuk (yellow card) 87' (yellow-red card) 90+6'	Report	Koyalipou 21', 90+4'; Carreazo 33'; Eto'o (yellow card) 65'; Turitsov (yellow card) 86'	Stadium: Stadion Bistritsa; Attendance: 892; Referee: Kristiyan Kolev (Plovdiv); Man of the Match: Goduine Koyalipou
Note: The game has been originally scheduled for 11 August 2024, but has been rescheduled due to CSKA 1948's ongoing participation in the 2024–25 UEFA Conference League. On 1 October the technical committee of the BFU rescheduled the game for 7 November 2024.

10 November 2024 15	CSKA	2−2	Krumovgrad	Sofia
15:00 UTC+2	Koyalipou 27', 58'; I. Iliev (yellow card) 53'	Report	Ali (yellow card) 18'; Milev 74' (pen.), 90+5'	Stadium: Natsionalen stadion Vasil Levski; Attendance: 1,948; Referee: Mihael Pavlov (Veliko Tarnovo); Man of the Match: Nasko Milev

24 November 2024 16	CSKA	2−2	Ludogorets	Sofia
17:00 UTC+2	Lindesth (yellow card) 15'; Koyalipou 32'; Vion (yellow card) 45+2'; Dyulgerov (yellow card) 47'; Dellova (yellow card) 87'; Phaëton 90+1'	Report	Rwan Cruz (yellow card) 5'; Erick 8'; Yordanov (yellow card) 14'; Verdon (yellow card) 45+1'; Chochev 73'	Stadium: Natsionalen stadion Vasil Levski; Attendance: 15,000; Referee: Georgi Kabakov (Plovdiv); Man of the Match: Matthias Phaëton

30 November 2024 17	Hebar	0−1	CSKA	Pazardzhik
17:30 UTC+2	Rosa (yellow card) 18'; Makni (yellow card) 59'	Report	Lokilo (yellow card) 18'; Lindseth (yellow card) 22'; Koyalipou 31'; Sanyang (yellow card) 90+1'	Stadium: Stadion Georgi Benkovski; Attendance: 2,897; Referee: Nikola Popov (Sofia); Man of the Match: Goduine Koyalipou

3 December 2024 18	CSKA	3−1	Spartak	Sofia
17:30 UTC+2	Koyalipou 7', 66'; Vion 62'	Report	Ahmedov 53'; Couto (yellow card) 90+2'	Stadium: Natsionalen stadion Vasil Levski; Attendance: 2,238; Referee: Stanimir Trenchev (Sofia); Man of the Match: Goduine Koyalipou

7 December 2024 19	CSKA	2−2	CSKA 1948	Sofia
17:30 UTC+2	Dellova (yellow card) 25'; Koyalipou 57'; Phaëton (yellow card) 85'; Bytyqi 88'; Shopov (yellow card) 90+3'; Tomash (yellow card) FT	Report	Thalis 27' (pen.); Furtado 39'; Daskalov (yellow card) 50'; Serdyuk (yellow card) 80'	Stadium: Natsionalen stadion Vasil Levski; Attendance: 2,300; Referee: Martin Velikov (Varna); Man of the Match: Zymer Bytyqi

8 February 2025 20	Slavia	1−0	CSKA	Sofia
17:30 UTC+2	Kerchev 63'; Fabien (yellow card) 79'; Krastev (yellow card) 90+2'	Report	Shopov (yellow card) 43'	Stadium: Stadion Aleksandar Shalamanov; Attendance: 4,677; Referee: Valentin Zhelezov (Burgas); Man of the Match: Ventsislav Kerchev

16 February 2025 21	CSKA	2−0	Arda	Sofia
17:30 UTC+2	Lokilo 9'; Eto'o (yellow card) 37'; Vion (yellow card) 45+2'; Pinto 63'; Dyulgerov (yellow card) 73'	Report	Idowu (yellow card) 48'; Offor (yellow card) 80'	Stadium: Natsionalen stadion Vasil Levski; Attendance: 1,324; Referee: Krasen Georgiev (Varna); Man of the Match: Jason Lokilo

22 February 2025 22	Botev Plovdiv	0−3	CSKA	Plovdiv
15:00 UTC+2	Maraš (yellow card) 41'; Balogiannis (yellow card) 51'; Akere (yellow card) 83'; Remeikis (yellow card) 89'	Report	Vion 8'; Eto'o (yellow card) 36'; Carreazo 47', (yellow card) 53'; Lindseth 60'	Stadium: Stadion Hristo Botev; Attendance: 7,730; Referee: Mariyan Grebencharski (Samokov); Man of the Match: Thibaut Vion

2 March 2025 23	CSKA	2−2	Levski	Sofia
14:00 UTC+2	Pittas 40'; Eto'o (yellow card) 51' (red card) 90+10'; I. Iliev (yellow card) 51'; Shopov (yellow card) 54'; Carreazo (yellow card) 61'; Panayotov 84'; Skarsem (yellow card) 90+1'; Pinto (yellow card) 90+9'; Dyulgerov (yellow card) 90+9'	Report	El Jemili (yellow card) 62'; Aldair (yellow card) 86', (goal) 90+13'; Stefanov 90+5'; Everton Bala (yellow card) 90+9'; Lima (red card) 90+10'	Stadium: Natsionalen stadion Vasil Levski; Attendance: 23,345; Referee: Radoslav Gidzhenov (Plovdiv); Man of the Match: Iliyan Stefanov

8 March 2025 24	Beroe	0−2	CSKA	Stara Zagora
15:00 UTC+2	Segundo Pachamé (yellow card) 57'	Report	Shopov 53'; Pittas 72'; Vion (yellow card) 74'; Dellova (red card) 90+1'	Stadium: Stadion Beroe; Attendance: 5,323; Referee: Georgi Davidov (Veliko Tarnovo); Man of the Match: Stanislav Shopov

15 March 2025 25	CSKA	1−1	Cherno More	Sofia
17:30 UTC+2	I. Iliev (yellow card) 29'; Lapeña (yellow card) 58'; Cooper 69'; Carreazo (yellow card) 77'; Lindseth (yellow card) 84'; Pittas (yellow card) 86'; Pinto (yellow card) 90+1'	Report	Popov (yellow card) 8'; Donchev 40'; Martín (yellow card) 55'; Iliev (yellow card) 86'	Stadium: Natsionalen stadion Vasil Levski; Attendance: 7,000; Referee: Vasil Minev (Sofia); Man of the Match: Liam Cooper

29 March 2025 26	Septemvri	0−1	CSKA	Sofia
17:15 UTC+2	Mitkov (yellow card) 32'; Ozornwafor (yellow card) 68'	Report	Eto'o 90+6'; Lokilo (yellow card) 90+8'	Stadium: Stadion Lokomotiv (Note: Septemvri plays their league home games at Stadion Lokomotiv, Sofia, instead of their regular stadium Stadion Septemvri, Sofia, which does not meet the BFU requirements.); Attendance: 3,210; Referee: Vladimir Valkov (Plovdiv); Man of the Match: James Eto'o

2 April 2025 27	CSKA	1−0	Lokomotiv Sofia	Sofia
19:15 UTC+3	Skarsem 26', (yellow card) 53'; Phaëton (yellow card) 90+3'	Report	Brrou (yellow card) 45+1'; Ali (yellow card) 82'	Stadium: Natsionalen stadion Vasil Levski; Attendance: 1,800; Referee: Dragomir Draganov (Varna); Man of the Match: Olaus Skarsem

5 April 2025 28	Botev Vratsa	1−1	CSKA	Vratsa
19:00 UTC+3	Traorè 37'; Suárez (yellow card) 71'; Georgiev (yellow card) 81'; Genov (yellow card) 88'	Report	Dellova (yellow card) 62'; Phaëton (yellow card) 82', (goal) 90+1'; Shopov (yellow card) 90+2'	Stadium: Stadion Hristo Botev; Attendance: 2,000; Referee: Volen Chinkov (Sofia); Man of the Match: Hamza Ait Allal

12 April 2025 29	CSKA	2−0	Lokomotiv Plovdiv	Sofia
16:30 UTC+3	Pittas 56', 64'; Phaëton (yellow card) 69'	Report	H. Ivanov (yellow card) 54'; Perea (yellow card) 62'; Umarbayev (yellow card) 67'; I. Ivanov (yellow card) 73'	Stadium: Natsionalen stadion Vasil Levski; Attendance: 4,125; Referee: Martin Velikov (Varna); Man of the Match: Ioannis Pittas

18 April 2025 30	Krumovgrad	1−0	CSKA	Plovdiv (Note: Krumovgrad plays their league home games at Sporten kompleks Nikola Shterev - Starika, Plovdiv, instead of their regular stadium Stadion Krumovgrad, Krumovgrad, which does not meet the BFU requirements.)
19:00 UTC+3	N'dour (yellow card) 21'; Dost (yellow card) 45'; Tsvetanov 53' (pen.); Carcela (yellow card) 55'; Cova (yellow card) 79'	Report	Vion (yellow card) 61'; Tasev (yellow card) 90+9'	Stadium: Sporten kompleks Nikola Shterev - Starika; Attendance: 1,211; Referee: Krasen Georgiev (Varna); Man of the Match: Momchil Tsvetanov

==== Conference League round ====
===== League table =====
Pos	Team	Pld	W	D	L	GF	GA	GD	Pts	Qualification
1	CSKA Sofia	36	19	8	9	58	28	+30	65	Qualification for the Conference League play-off
2	Botev Plovdiv	36	16	8	12	43	43	0	56	
3	Spartak Varna	36	15	6	15	45	53	−8	51	
4	Beroe	36	14	7	15	41	43	−2	49	

Source: soccerway, Bulgarian Football
Rules for classification: 1) Points; 2) Head-to-head points; 3) Head-to-head goal difference; 4) Head-to-head goals scored; 5) Head-to-head away goals scored (only if two teams); 6) Goal difference; 7) Goals scored; 8) Fairplay ranking; 9) Draw

===== Results summary =====
Overall								Home						Away					
Pld	W	D	L	GF	GA	GD	Pts	W	D	L	GF	GA	GD	W	D	L	GF	GA	GD
6	6	0	0	18	1	+17	18	3	0	0	10	1	+9	3	0	0	8	0	+8

Last updated: complete.
Source: See results

===== Results by round =====
Round	1	2	3	4	5	6
Ground	A	A	H	H	H	A
Result	W	W	W	W	W	W
Position	5	5	5	5	5	5

Source: See Results
A = Away; H = Home; W = Win; D = Draw; L = Loss

===== Results =====
26 April 2025 31	Spartak	0−1	CSKA	Varna
17:30 UTC+3	Lozev (yellow card) 67'; Mitkov (yellow card) 68'	Report	Dellova 3', (yellow card) 90+3'; Lokilo (yellow card) 54'; Eto'o (yellow card) 60'; Iseka (yellow card) 73'	Stadium: Stadion Spartak; Attendance: 3,678; Referee: Valentin Zhelezov (Burgas); Man of the Match: Lumbardh Dellova

3 May 2025 32	Beroe	0−3	CSKA	Stara Zagora
17:00 UTC+3		Report	I. Iliev 14'; Carreazo (yellow card) 55'; Tasev 76'; Sanyang 82'	Stadium: Stadion Beroe; Attendance: 4,890; Referee: Dimitar Dimitrov (Sofia); Man of the Match: Ilian Iliev

9 May 2025 33	CSKA	3−0	Botev Plovdiv	Sofia
20:15 UTC+3	Carreazo 12'; Shopov 27'; Pittas 58' (pen.)	Report	Videv (yellow card) 51'; Maraš (yellow card) 67'; Ukaki (yellow card) 75'	Stadium: Natsionalen stadion Vasil Levski; Referee: Krasen Georgiev (Varna); Man of the Match: Stanislav Shopov

13 May 2025 34	CSKA	5−0	Spartak	Pazardzhik (Note: The game has been moved to Stadion Georgi Benkovski in Pazardzhik, as Natsionalen stadion Vasil Levski will host the finale of the Bulgarian version of Your Face Sounds Familiar.)
20:15 UTC+3	Shopov 28'; Pittas (yellow card) 41', (goal) 53'; I. Iliev (yellow card) 43', (goal) 61'; Sanyang 55'; Lapoukhov (yellow card) 67'; Bytyqi 83'	Report	Mitev (yellow card) 43'; Baurenski (yellow card) 59'; Vutov (yellow card) 65'	Stadium: Stadion Georgi Benkovski; Attendance: 3,665; Referee: Mariyan Grebencharski (Samokov); Man of the Match: Ioannis Pittas

17 May 2025 35	CSKA	2−1	Beroe	Pazardzhik
17:30 UTC+3	Shopov 18'; Bytyqi 84'	Report	Salido 10'; Yovkov (yellow card) 14'; Sérgio (yellow card) 47'	Stadium: Stadion Georgi Benkovski; Attendance: 2,948; Referee: Vladimir Valkov (Plovdiv); Man of the Match: Stanislav Shopov

26 May 2025 36	Botev Plovdiv	0−4	CSKA	Plovdiv
20:45 UTC+3	Balogiannis (yellow card) 42'; Popov (yellow card) 42'	Report	Shopov 28'; I. Iliev 51'; Pittas 62'; Tasev 81'	Stadium: Stadion Hristo Botev; Referee: Dragomir Draganov (Varna); Man of the Match: Stanislav Shopov

==== European play-off final ====
31 May 2025	Arda	1−1 (a.e.t.) (4−1 p)	CSKA	Kardzhali
18:30 UTC+3	Yordanov (yellow card) 24'; Tsonev (yellow card) 26'; Cascardo (yellow card) 43'; Gospodinov (yellow card) 50'; Kotev (yellow card) 70'; Offor (yellow card) 71'; Shinyashiki 90+2'	Report	Dellova (yellow card) 30'; Sanyang (yellow card) 42'; Vion 50'	Stadium: Arena Arda; Referee: Radoslav Gidzhenov (Plovdiv); Man of the Match: Anatoli Gospodinov
	Penalties
	Offor (penalty scored); Yusein (penalty scored); Kotev (penalty scored); Idowu (penalty scored)		(penalty scored) Pittas; (penalty missed) Sanyang; (penalty missed) Eto'o

=== Bulgarian Cup ===
29 October 2024 1R	Dobrudzha	0−4	CSKA	Dobrich
13:30 UTC+2		Report	I. Iliev 17'; Carreazo 24'; Heintz 58'; Koyalipou 71' (pen.)	Stadium: Stadion Druzhba; Attendance: 3,453; Referee: Valentin Zhelezov (Burgas)

15 December 2024 2R	Spartak	2−3	CSKA	Varna
16:00 UTC+2	Ahmedov 3'; Vutov (yellow card) 4'; Mitev 25', (yellow card) 43'; Granchov (yellow card) 31'; Velichkov (yellow card) 33'; Kirov (yellow card) 90+6'	Report	Eto'o (yellow card) 16'; Iseka 27', (yellow card) 90+3'; Bytyqi 32', (yellow card) 33'; Dellova (yellow card) 65', (goal) 78'; Shopov (yellow card) 68'; I. Iliev (yellow card) 76'; Busatto (yellow card) 90+5'	Stadium: Stadion Spartak; Attendance: 4,734; Referee: Radoslav Gidzhenov (Plovdiv)

26 February 2025 QF	CSKA	2−1	Arda	Sofia
18:00 UTC+2	Viyachki 21' (o.g.); Pittas 37'; Tasev (yellow card) 90+1'	Report	Yusein (yellow card) 14'; Idowu (yellow card) 51'; Pinto 71' (o.g.); Kotev (yellow card) 88'	Stadium: Natsionalen stadion Vasil Levski; Attendance: 2,576; Referee: Valentin Zhelezov (Burgas)

9 April 2025 SF Leg 1	Cherno More	0−0	CSKA	Varna
19:00 UTC+3	Zlatev (yellow card) 49'; Dimov (yellow card) 81'	Report	Skarsem (yellow card) 36'; Lindseth (yellow card) 65'; I. Iliev (yellow card) 84'; Lapeña (yellow card) 86'	Stadium: Stadion Ticha; Attendance: 6,211; Referee: Georgi Kabakov (Plovdiv)

22 April 2025 SF Leg 2	CSKA	2−1	Cherno More	Sofia
19:00 UTC+3	Pittas 26', 45+1'; Lapoukhov (yellow card) 40'; Vion (yellow card) 64'; Panayotov (yellow card) 89'; Lindseth (yellow card) 90+4'	Report	Martín (yellow card) 23'; Iliev (yellow card) 25'; Tonev (yellow card) 31'; Beyhan 87'	Stadium: Natsionalen stadion Vasil Levski; Attendance: 8,211; Referee: Radoslav Gidzhenov (Plovdiv)

22 May 2025 Final	Ludogorets	1−0	CSKA	Sofia
19:00 UTC+3	Caio Vidal (yellow card) 32', (goal) 34'; Verdon (yellow card) 68'; Padt (yellow card) 74'; Rusev (yellow card) 77'; Camara (yellow card) 90+6'	Report	Lapeña (yellow card) 18'	Stadium: Natsionalen stadion Vasil Levski; Attendance: 37,455; Referee: Georgi Kabakov (Plovdiv)

== Statistics ==
=== Appearances and goals ===
No.	Pos	Nat	Player	Total		Parva Liga		Bulgarian Cup	
No.	Pos	Nat	Player	Apps	Goals	Apps	Goals	Apps	Goals
1	GK	(Brazil) BRA	Gustavo Busatto	11	-10	10	-8	1	-2
2	DF	(Bulgaria) BUL	Lachezar Ivanov	0	0	0	0	0	0
3	DF	(The Gambia) GAM	Sainey Sanyang	16	2	9+6	2	0+1	0
4	DF	(Spain) ESP	Adrián Lapeña	21	0	15+2	0	4	0
5	DF	(Kosovo) KOS	Lumbardh Dellova	36	2	31	1	5	1
6	DF	(Scotland) SCO	Liam Cooper	25	1	18+4	1	3	0
7	MF	(Norway) NOR	Olaus Skarsem	30	1	18+7	1	4+1	0
8	MF	(Bulgaria) BUL	Stanislav Shopov	36	6	24+7	6	3+2	0
9	FW	(Kosovo) KOS	Zymer Bytyqi	19	5	7+10	4	1+1	1
10	MF	(Norway) NOR	Jonathan Lindseth	38	2	26+7	2	4+1	0
11	FW	(Guadeloupe) GLP	Matthias Phaëton	28	4	15+10	4	2+1	0
12	GK	(Bulgaria) BUL	Marin Orlinov	0	0	0	0	0	0
13	DF	(Colombia) COL	Brayan Córdoba	11	0	4+5	0	0+2	0
15	MF	(France) FRA	Thibaut Vion	39	3	30+3	3	6	0
16	MF	(Bulgaria) BUL	Georgi Chorbadzhiyski	13	1	3+8	1	0+2	0
18	MF	(Luxembourg) LUX	Mica Pinto	26	1	20+1	1	5	0
19	DF	(Bulgaria) BUL	Ivan Turitsov	29	0	12+14	0	1+2	0
20	DF	(Bulgaria) BUL	Martin Stoychev	0	0	0	0	0	0
21	GK	(Belarus) BLR	Fyodor Lapoukhov	14	-7	11	-5	3	-2
22	FW	(Democratic Republic of the Congo) COD	Jason Lokilo	25	1	14+8	1	1+2	0
23	FW	(Bulgaria) BUL	Ilian Antonov	4	0	0+3	0	0+1	0
24	MF	(Bulgaria) BUL	Yulian Iliev	2	0	1+1	0	0	0
25	GK	(Bulgaria) BUL	Ivan Dyulgerov	19	-17	16+1	-16	2	-1
26	MF	(Colombia) COL	Marcelino Carreazo	34	5	28+1	4	5	1
28	FW	(Cyprus) CYP	Ioannis Pittas	22	10	16+2	7	4	3
29	FW	(Bulgaria) BUL	Ivan Tasev	14	2	3+9	2	0+2	0
30	MF	(Bulgaria) BUL	Petko Panayotov	22	1	2+17	1	0+3	0
45	FW	(Belgium) BEL	Aaron Leya Iseka	22	1	7+13	0	1+1	1
73	MF	(Bulgaria) BUL	Ilian Iliev	33	4	18+9	3	4+2	1
91	FW	(Bulgaria) BUL	Yoan Bornosuzov	6	0	0+5	0	0+1	0
99	MF	(Cameroon) CMR	James Eto'o	31	1	21+4	1	6	0
Players who appeared for CSKA Sofia that left during the season:
4	DF	(Bulgaria) BUL	Hristiyan Petrov	11	0	8+2	0	0+1	0
14	MF	(Norway) NOR	Tobias Heintz	14	1	7+6	0	0+1	1
17	MF	(Austria) AUT	Emanuel Šakić	1	0	0+1	0	0	0
28	FW	(Bulgaria) BUL	Mark-Emilio Papazov	2	0	0+2	0	0	0
77	FW	(Central African Republic) CAF	Goduine Koyalipou	17	15	14+2	14	1	1
—	GK	(Bulgaria) BUL	Dimitar Evtimov	0	0	0	0	0	0

=== Goalscorers ===
Place	Position	Nation	Number	Name	Parva Liga	Bulgarian Cup	Total
1	FW	(Central African Republic)	77	Goduine Koyalipou	14	1	15
2	FW	(Cyprus)	28	Ioannis Pittas	7	3	10
3	MF	(Bulgaria)	8	Stanislav Shopov	6	0	6
4	FW	(Kosovo)	9	Zymer Bytyqi	4	1	5
4	MF	(Colombia)	26	Marcelino Carreazo	4	1	5
6	FW	(Guadeloupe)	11	Matthias Phaëton	4	0	4
6	MF	(Bulgaria)	73	Ilian Iliev	3	1	4
8	DF	(France)	15	Thibaut Vion	3	0	3
9	DF	(Senegal)	3	Sainey Sanyang	2	0	2
9	DF	(Kosovo)	5	Lumbardh Dellova	1	1	2
9	MF	(Norway)	10	Jonathan Lindseth	2	0	2
9	FW	(Bulgaria)	29	Ivan Tasev	2	0	2
13	DF	(Scotland)	6	Liam Cooper	1	0	1
13	MF	(Norway)	7	Olaus Skarsem	1	0	1
13	MF	(Norway)	14	Tobias Heintz	0	1	1
13	MF	(Bulgaria)	16	Georgi Chorbadzhiyski	1	0	1
13	DF	(Luxembourg)	18	Mica Pinto	1	0	1
13	FW	(Democratic Republic of the Congo)	22	Jason Lokilo	1	0	1
13	MF	(Bulgaria)	30	Petko Panayotov	1	0	1
13	FW	(Belgium)	45	Aaron Leya Iseka	0	1	1
13	MF	(Cameroon)	99	James Eto'o	1	0	1
				Own goal	0	1	1
TOTALS					59	11	70

As of 26 May 2025

=== Disciplinary record ===
Includes all competitive matches. Players listed below made at least one appearance for CSKA first squad during the season.

N	P	Nat.	Name	Parva Liga			Bulgarian Cup			Total			Notes
N	P	Nat.	Name	Yellow card	Second yellow card	Red card	Yellow card	Second yellow card	Red card	Yellow card	Second yellow card	Red card	Notes
1	GK	(Brazil)	Gustavo Busatto				1			1			
3	DF	(The Gambia)	Sainey Sanyang	3						3			
4	DF	(Spain)	Adrián Lapeña	2			1			3			
5	DF	(Kosovo)	Lumbardh Dellova	6		1	1			7		1	
6	DF	(Scotland)	Liam Cooper	1						1			
7	MF	(Norway)	Olaus Skarsem	2			1			3			
8	MF	(Bulgaria)	Stanislav Shopov	4			1			5			
9	FW	(Kosovo)	Zymer Bytyqi				1			1			
10	MF	(Norway)	Jonathan Lindseth	5			1			6			
11	FW	(Guadeloupe)	Matthias Phaëton	5						5			
13	DF	(Colombia)	Brayan Córdoba	2						2			
14	MF	(Norway)	Tobias Heintz	1						1			
15	DF	(France)	Thibaut Vion	6			1			7			
18	DF	(Luxembourg)	Mica Pinto	3						3			
19	DF	(Bulgaria)	Ivan Turitsov	4						4			
21	GK	(Belarus)	Fyodor Lapoukhov	1			1			2			
22	FW	(Democratic Republic of the Congo)	Jason Lokilo	4						4			
25	GK	(Bulgaria)	Ivan Dyulgerov	3						3			
26	DF	(Colombia)	Marcelino Carreazo	6						6			
28	FW	(Cyprus)	Ioannis Pittas	2						2			
29	FW	(Bulgaria)	Ivan Tasev	1			1			2			
30	MF	(Bulgaria)	Petko Panayotov				1			1			
45	FW	(Belgium)	Aaron Leya Iseka	2			1			3			
73	MF	(Bulgaria)	Ilian Iliev	5			2			7			
99	MF	(Cameroon)	James Eto'o	7		1	1			8		1	
M		(Bulgaria)	Aleksandar Tomash	1						1			

Last updated: 31 May 2025
Source: Competitive matches
Only competitive matches
(yellow card) = Number of bookings; (second yellow card) = Number of sending offs after a second yellow card; (red card) = Number of sending offs by a direct red card.

== See also ==
- PFC CSKA Sofia
