= 2023–24 PFC CSKA Sofia season =

CSKA Sofia
2023–24 season
- Controlling owner: Danail Ganchev (40.0%); Danail Iliev (40.0%); Hristo Stoichkov (20.0%) (until 30 April 2024) Angel Borisov (40.0%); Stoyan Ormandzhiev (40.0%); Hristo Stoichkov (20.0%) (since 30 April 2024)
- Manager: Saša Ilić (until 29 July 2023); Nestor El Maestro (until 14 April 2024); Stamen Belchev (since 15 April 2024)
- Parva Liga: 3rd
- Bulgarian Cup: Semi-final
- UEFA Europa Conference League: Second qualifying round
Home colours	Away colours	Third colours
- All statistics correct as of 31 May 2024.

The 2023–24 season was CSKA Sofia's 75th season in the Parva Liga (the top flight of Bulgarian football) and their eighth consecutive participation after their administrative relegation to the third division due to mounting financial troubles. In addition to the domestic league, CSKA Sofia participated in this season's edition of the Bulgarian Cup and UEFA Europa Conference League.

== Players ==
=== Squad information ===
N	Pos.	Nat.	Name	Age	Since	App	Goals	Ends	Transfer fee	Notes
1	GK	(Brazil)	Gustavo Busatto	32	2019	186	0	2024	Free	
2	DF	(Netherlands)	Jurgen Mattheij	30	2020	121	11	2024	Free	
3	DF	(The Gambia)	Sainey Sanyang	20	2023	21	0	2028	€100,000	
4	DF	(Netherlands)	Menno Koch	28	2020 (Winter)	81	6	2024	€500,000	
5	DF	(Netherlands)	Bradley de Nooijer	25	2022	32	2	2024	€200,000	
6	DF	(Bulgaria)	Hristiyan Petrov	21	2020	69	1	2026	Youth system	
7	MF	(Norway)	Olaus Skarsem	24	2023 (Winter)	17	3	2027	€500,000	
8	MF	(Bulgaria)	Stanislav Shopov	21	2022	70	4	2025	Free	
9	FW	(Brazil)	Fernando Karanga	32	2023 (Winter)	53	36	2024	Free	
10	MF	(Norway)	Jonathan Lindseth	27	2022	77	11	2026	€500,000	Lindseth played previously with number 7 this season.
11	FW	(Guadeloupe)	Matthias Phaëton	23	2023	39	6	2026	€2,000,000	
12	GK	(Bulgaria)	Marin Orlinov	28	2023	0	0	2024	Free	
13	DF	(Colombia)	Brayan Córdoba	23	2023	28	0	2027	€1,180,000	
14	FW	(Norway)	Tobias Heintz	24	2022 (Winter)	57	9	2026	€600,000	
15	DF	(France)	Thibaut Vion	29	2020	135	4	2025	Free	
16	MF	(Bulgaria)	Georgi Chorbadzhiyski	18	2023	7	0	2028	Youth system	
17	DF	(Austria)	Emanuel Šakić	32	2023	26	0	2025	Free	
19	DF	(Bulgaria)	Ivan Turitsov	23	2018	174	7	2024	Youth system	
20	DF	(Bulgaria)	Martin Stoychev	19	2023 (Winter)	5	0	2027	Undisclosed	
21	MF	(Central African Republic)	Amos Youga	30	2020	147	6	2026	Free	
22	MF	(Luxembourg)	Enes Mahmutović	26	2021 (Winter)	44	1	2024	Free	
23	MF	(Bulgaria)	Ilian Antonov	18	2022	5	0	2027	Youth system	
24	MF	(Bulgaria)	Petko Panayotov	17	2021	2	0	2027	Youth system	
25	GK	(Bulgaria)	Dimitar Evtimov	27	2020	31	0	2025	Free	
26	MF	(Colombia)	Marcelino Carreazo	23	2022	62	6	2025	€100,000	
27	MF	(Serbia)	Lazar Tufegdžić	26	2022	38	5	2025	€300,000	
28	DF	(Bulgaria)	Nasko Tsekov	17	2021	1	0	2027	Youth system	
30	FW	(Colombia)	Danilo Asprilla	34	2023	30	5	2025	€180,000	

- Last updated: 31 May 2024
- Source: Players transfer and Wikipedia players' articles
- Ordered by squad number.

== Transfers ==
=== In ===
No.	Pos.	Nat.	Name	Age	EU	Moving from	Type	Transfer window	Ends	Transfer fee	Source
12	GK	(Bulgaria)	Marin Orlinov	28	EU	(Bulgaria) Litex Lovech	Free transfer	Summer		Free	dsport.bg
24	FW	(Bulgaria)	Mark-Emilio Papazov	19	EU	(Bulgaria) Hebar	Loan return	Summer		Free	
3	DF	(The Gambia)	Sainey Sanyang	20	Non-EU	(The Gambia) Hawks	Transfer	Summer	2026	€100,000	cska.bg
11	FW	(Guadeloupe)	Matthias Phaëton	23	EU	(France) Grenoble	Transfer	Summer	2026	€2,000,000	cska.bg
29	FW	(Ecuador)	Michael Estrada	27	Non-EU	(Mexico) Toluca	Loan	Summer	2024	Free	cska.bg
13	DF	(Colombia)	Brayan Córdoba	23	Non-EU	(Colombia) América de Cali	Transfer	Summer	2026	€1,180,000	cska.bg
30	FW	(Colombia)	Danilo Asprilla	34	Non-EU	(Israel) Beitar Jerusalem	Transfer	Summer	2025	€180,000	cska.bg
17	DF	(Austria)	Emanuel Šakić	32	EU	(Greece) Kifisia	Transfer	Summer	2025	Free	cska.bg
7	MF	(Norway)	Olaus Skarsem	25	EU	(Norway) Rosenborg BK	Transfer	Winter	2027	€500,000	cska.bg
9	FW	(Brazil)	Fernando Karanga	32	EU	(China) Jinan Xingzhou	Transfer	Winter	2027	Free	cska.bg
20	DF	(Bulgaria)	Martin Stoychev	20	EU	(Bulgaria) Septemvri Sofia	Transfer	Winter	2027	Undisclosed	cska.bg

=== Out ===
No.	Pos.	Nat.	Name	Age	EU	Moving to	Type	Transfer window	Transfer fee	Source
3	DF	(Brazil)	Geferson	29	EU	(Brazil) Paysandu	Released	Summer	Free	dsport.bg
10	FW	(Brazil)	Maurício Garcez	26	Non-EU	(Brazil) Brusque	Loan return	Summer	Free	topsport.bg
13	DF	(Bulgaria)	Galin Minkov	25	EU	(Bulgaria) Lokomotiv Sofia	Transfer	Summer	Free	dsport.bg
20	FW	(Bulgaria)	Radoslav Zhivkov	24	EU	(Bulgaria) Sportist Svoge	Transfer	Summer	Free	trud.bg
30	FW	(Ivory Coast)	Daouda Bamba	28	EU	(Turkey) Ümraniyespor	Released	Summer	Free	topsport.bg
—	MF	(Bulgaria)	Georgi Yomov	25	EU	Released	Released	Summer	Free	
—	FW	(Bulgaria)	Martin Smolenski	20	EU	(Bulgaria) Botev Vratsa	Transfer	Summer	Free	topsport.bg
—	FW	(Bulgaria)	Kaloyan Krastev	24	EU	(Bulgaria) Lokomotiv Sofia	Transfer	Summer	Free	cska.bg
—	FW	(Bulgaria)	Ivan Mitrev	24	EU	Retired	Released	Summer	Free	kotasport.com
31	GK	(Bulgaria)	Iliya Shalamanov-Trenkov	20	EU	(Australia) Port Melbourne SC	Released	Summer	Free	topsport.bg
18	MF	(Bulgaria)	Simeon Aleksandrov	19	EU	(Bulgaria) Pirin	Loan	Summer	Free	cska.bg
30	DF	(Bulgaria)	Aleksandar Buchkov	19	EU	(Bulgaria) Pirin	Loan	Summer	Free	cska.bg
12	GK	(Bulgaria)	Aleks Bozhev	17	EU	(Bulgaria) Litex Lovech	Loan	Summer	Free	cska.bg
—	FW	(Bulgaria)	Pavel Zhabov	19	EU	(Bulgaria) Litex Lovech	Loan	Summer	Free	cska.bg
—	DF	(Bulgaria)	Rosen Marinov	18	EU	(Bulgaria) Litex Lovech	Loan	Summer	Free	cska.bg
17	FW	(Ghana)	Bismark Charles	22	Non-EU	(Bulgaria) Pirin	Loan	Summer	Free	topsport.bg
28	FW	(Colombia)	Brayan Moreno	24	Non-EU	(Azerbaijan) Neftçi Baku	Released	Winter	Free	cska.bg
16	DF	(Bulgaria)	Asen Donchev	22	EU	(Bulgaria) Pirin	Loan	Winter	Free	cska.bg
10	MF	(Armenia)	Zhirayr Shaghoyan	22	Non-EU	Ararat-Armenia	Loan return	Winter	Free	cska.bg
—	MF	(Bulgaria)	Simeon Aleksandrov	20	EU	(Bulgaria) Septemvri Sofia	Loan	Winter	Free	topsport.bg
—	DF	(Bulgaria)	Aleksandar Buchkov	20	EU	(Bulgaria) Litex Lovech	Loan	Winter	Free	
—	FW	(Ghana)	Bismark Charles	22	Non-EU	(Bosnia and Herzegovina) Željezničar Sarajevo	Loan	Winter	Free	dsport.bg
9	FW	(Haiti)	Duckens Nazon	29	EU	(Turkey) Kayserispor	Transfer	Winter	€200,000	cska.bg
24	FW	(Bulgaria)	Mark-Emilio Papazov	20	EU	(Bulgaria) Hebar	Loan	Winter	Free	cska.bg
29	FW	(Ecuador)	Michael Estrada	27	Non-EU	(Ecuador) LDU Quito	Loan return	Winter	Free	dsport.bg
—	FW	(Bulgaria)	Pavel Zhabov	19	EU	(Bulgaria) Chernomorets Burgas	Loan	Winter	Free	topsport.bg

== Pre-season and friendlies ==
Win Draw Loss Fixtures

=== Pre-season ===
27 June 2023 Friendly	CSKA (Bulgaria)	1–0	(Romania) Botoșani	Jenbach, Austria
19:00 UTC+3	Șeroni 6' (o.g.); Vion (yellow card) 65'	Report	Ilaș (yellow card) 49'	Stadium: Stadion Jenbach

1 July 2023 Friendly	CSKA (Bulgaria)	1−0	(Switzerland) Basel	Kematen in Tirol, Austria
14:00 UTC+3	Heintz 47'; Turitsov (yellow card) 59'	Report		Stadium: Melach Road

4 July 2023 Friendly	CSKA (Bulgaria)	0−1	(Azerbaijan) Qarabağ	Wörgl, Austria
19:00 UTC+3	Mahmutović (yellow card) 19'; Shopov (yellow card) 65'	Report	Xhixha 42'	Stadium: Sportzentrum Wörgl

8 July 2023 Friendly	CSKA (Bulgaria)	2−1	(Austria) WSG Tirol	Neustift im Stubaital, Austria
18:30 UTC+3	Carreazo 7'; Zhabov 90'	Report	Prelec 27'	Stadium: Sportplatz Neustift Kamplersee

=== On-season (autumn) ===
9 September 2023 Friendly	CSKA	5−1	Litex	Teteven, Bulgaria
11:00 UTC+3	Estrada 14'; Vion (yellow card) 45', (goal) 88'; Asprilla 55', 62'; Nazon 85'	Report	Zhabov 8'; ? (yellow card) 60'	Stadium: Stadion Georgi Benkovski

14 October 2023 Friendly	CSKA	5−1	Litex	Teteven, Bulgaria
11:00 UTC+3	Moreno 26'; Shaghoyan 28'; Koch 38'; Estrada 50'; Sanyang 56'	Report	Kapitanov 17'; Georgiev (yellow card) 49'; Nankov (yellow card) 60'	Stadium: Stadion Georgi Benkovski

=== Mid-season ===
12 January 2024 Friendly	CSKA	5−3	Litex	Boyana, Bulgaria
13:00 UTC+2	Papazov 2'; Phaëton 22' (pen.); Nazon 23'; Antonov 56'; Lindseth 90'	Report	I. Ivanov 6'; Staykov 29'; Buchi 71'	Stadium: Natsionalna futbolna baza Boyana

20 January 2024 Friendly	CSKA (Bulgaria)	0−2	(Poland) Korona Kielce	Aksu, Turkey
15:00 UTC+2	Youga (red card) 37'	Report	Malarczyk 39'; Dalmau 50' (pen.)	Stadium: Miracle Resort Hotel Futbol Kompleksi

25 January 2024 Friendly	CSKA (Bulgaria)	0−1	(Iran) Tractor	Serik, Turkey
15:00 UTC+2	Youga (red card) 74'	Report	Hadi 52'	Stadium: Papillon Belek Sport Center

30 January 2024 Friendly	CSKA (Bulgaria)	2−0	(Slovakia) AS Trenčín	Aksu, Turkey
14:00 UTC+2	Heintz 53'; Nazon 85'	Report		Stadium: Asteria Kremlin Palace Football Center

3 February 2024 Friendly	CSKA (Bulgaria)	2−1	(Czech Republic) Bohemians 1905	Serik, Turkey
15:00 UTC+2	Nazon 9'; Phaëton 52'	Report	Kozák 82'	Stadium: Papillon Belek Sport Center

10 February 2024 Friendly	CSKA	1−0	Septemvri	Pancharevo, Bulgaria
12:30 UTC+2	Petrov 57'	Report		Stadium: Sporten kompleks Pancharevo

== Competitions ==
=== Overview ===
Competition	First match	Last match	Starting round	Final position	Record							
Competition	First match	Last match	Starting round	Final position	Pld	W	D	L	GF	GA	GD	Win %
Parva Liga	16 July 2023	25 May 2024	Matchday 1	Third place	36	20	7	9	56	29	+27	55.56
Bulgarian Cup	1 November 2023	1 May 2024	First round	Semi-final	5	3	0	2	5	3	+2	60.00
UEFA Europa Conference League	27 July 2023	3 August 2023	Second qualifying round	Second qualifying round	2	0	0	2	0	6	−6	0.00
Total					43	23	7	13	61	38	+23	53.49

Last updated: 31 May 2024
Source: Competitions

=== Parva Liga ===
==== Regular stage ====
===== League table =====
Pos	Team	Pld	W	D	L	GF	GA	GD	Pts	Qualification
1	Ludogorets Razgrad	30	24	3	3	78	15	+63	75	Qualification for the Championship group
2	CSKA Sofia	30	19	6	5	50	19	+31	63	Qualification for the Championship group
3	Cherno More	30	18	8	4	47	25	+22	62	Qualification for the Championship group
4	Lokomotiv Plovdiv	30	16	7	7	50	34	+16	55	Qualification for the Championship group
5	Levski Sofia	30	16	6	8	45	26	+19	54	Qualification for the Championship group

Source: soccerway, Bulgarian Football
Rules for classification: 1) Points; 2) Head-to-head points; 3) Head-to-head goal difference; 4) Head-to-head goals scored; 5) Head-to-head away goals scored (only if two teams); 6) Goal difference; 7) Goals scored; 8) Fairplay ranking; 9) Draw

===== Results summary =====
Overall								Home						Away					
Pld	W	D	L	GF	GA	GD	Pts	W	D	L	GF	GA	GD	W	D	L	GF	GA	GD
30	19	6	5	50	19	+31	63	8	4	3	25	8	+17	11	2	2	25	11	+14

Last updated: 21 April 2024.
Source: See results

===== Results by round =====
Round	1	2	3	4	5	6	7	8	9	10	11	12	13	14	15	16	17	18	19	20	21	22	23	24	25	26	27	28	29	30
Ground	A	H	A	H	A	A	H	A	H	A	H	A	H	A	H	H	A	H	A	H	H	A	H	A	H	A	H	A	H	A
Result	D	W	W	D	L	W	D	W	W	W	W	W	D	W	D	W	W	W	D	L	W	L	W	W	W	W	L	W	L	W
Position	10	5	3	5	7	7	8	5	3	3	3	3	3	1	2	1	1	1	2	3	3	3	3	3	3	2	3	2	3	2

Updated to match(es) played on 21 April 2024. Source: See Results
A = Away; H = Home; W = Win; D = Draw; L = Loss

===== Results =====
16 July 2023 1	Hebar	0−0	CSKA	Pazardzhik
21:00 UTC+3	Tisovski (yellow card) 52'; Nikolov (yellow card) 75'; Kabov (yellow card) 86'	Report	Sanyang (yellow card) 73'	Stadium: Stadion Georgi Benkovski; Referee: Stanimir Trenchev (Sofia); Man of the Match: Petar Debarliev

21 July 2023 2	CSKA	1−0	Krumovgrad	Sofia
21:15 UTC+3	Heintz 24'; Youga (yellow card) 27'; Busatto (yellow card) 90+3'	Report	Katsarov (yellow card) 12'; Kolev (yellow card) 26'; Bonev (yellow card) 61'	Stadium: Stadion Balgarska Armia; Referee: Vladimir Valkov (Plovdiv); Man of the Match: Tobias Heintz

6 August 2023 4	CSKA	1−1	Slavia	Sofia
18:45 UTC+3	Vion (yellow card) 42'; Lindseth (yellow card) 60'; Shopov (yellow card) 64'; Turitsov (yellow card) 75'; Tufegdžić 82'; Córdoba (yellow card) 90+5'	Report	Ivanov (yellow card) 65', (goal) 76'; Krastev (yellow card) 90+1'; Nikolov (yellow card) 90+4'	Stadium: Stadion Balgarska Armia; Attendance: 4,148; Referee: Radoslav Gidzhenov (Plovdiv); Man of the Match: Galin Ivanov

13 August 2023 5	Ludogorets	3−0	CSKA	Razgrad
21:15 UTC+3	Rwan 8'; Sanyang 33' (o.g.); Tekpetey (yellow card) 55'; Despodov 56' (pen.); Sonko Sundberg (red card) 73'; Verdon (yellow card) 83'	Report	Vion (yellow card) 32'; Busatto (yellow card) 55'; Lindseth (yellow card) 58'; Shaghoyan (yellow card) 69'	Stadium: Huvepharma Arena; Referee: Nikola Popov (Sofia); Man of the Match: Kiril Despodov

19 August 2023 6	Botev Vratsa	0−2	CSKA	Vratsa
21:15 UTC+3	Georgiev (yellow card) 1'	Report	Nazon 6'; Shopov (yellow card) 18'; Petrov (yellow card) 21'; Heintz 84'	Stadium: Stadion Hristo Botev; Attendance: 4,962; Referee: Georgi Kabakov (Plovdiv); Man of the Match: Tobias Heintz

26 August 2023 7	CSKA	1−1	Cherno More	Sofia
21:15 UTC+3	Nazon 15'; Petrov (yellow card) 35'; Youga (yellow card) 67'; Sanyang (yellow card) 82'	Report	Fernandes (yellow card) 51'; Álvarez (yellow card) 55'; Drobarov 77'; Dyulgerov (yellow card) 90+1'	Stadium: Stadion Balgarska Armia; Referee: Volen Chinkov (Sofia); Man of the Match: Duckens Nazon

2 September 2023 8	Beroe	0−3	CSKA	Stara Zagora
21:15 UTC+3	Valkov (yellow card) 13'; Ceijas (yellow card) 49'	Report	Heintz (yellow card) 5', (goal) 20'; Nazon 18'; Vion (yellow card) 39'; Lindseth 63'; Youga (yellow card) 70'	Stadium: Stadion Beroe; Referee: Radoslav Gidzhenov (Plovdiv); Man of the Match: Tobias Heintz

17 September 2023 9	CSKA	2−0	CSKA 1948	Sofia
20:15 UTC+3	Nazon 74', 81'	Report	Umarbayev (yellow card) 29'; Furtado (yellow card) 79'; Héliton (yellow card) 90+2'; Pedrinho (yellow card) 90+4'	Stadium: Stadion Balgarska Armia; Referee: Georgi Kabakov (Plovdiv); Man of the Match: Duckens Nazon

22 September 2023 10	Botev Plovdiv	1−2	CSKA	Plovdiv
20:00 UTC+3	Conte (yellow card) 45+4'; Balogiannis 79'; Rabeï (yellow card) 90+5'; Karabelyov (yellow card) 90+10'	Report	Lindseth 21'; Vion (yellow card) 39'; Carreazo (yellow card) 41'; Phaëton (yellow card) 45+4'; Nazon 67' (pen.); Busatto (yellow card) 90+2'	Stadium: Stadion Hristo Botev; Referee: Georgi Davidov (Veliko Tarnovo); Man of the Match: Jonathan Lindseth

28 September 2023 11	CSKA	2−0	Lokomotiv Sofia	Sofia
20:30 UTC+3	Carreazo (yellow card) 26'; Estrada 40', 45'	Report	Franco (yellow card) 24'; Naydenov (yellow card) 36'	Stadium: Stadion Balgarska Armia; Referee: Kristiyan Kolev (Plovdiv); Man of the Match: Michael Estrada

2 October 2023 12	Lokomotiv Plovdiv	0−2	CSKA	Plovdiv
20:00 UTC+3	Lyaskov (yellow card) 45+3'; Ali (yellow card) 48'	Report	Estrada 20'; Nazon (yellow card) 26', (goal) 39', (penalty missed) 45+2'; Petrov (yellow card) 41'; Carreazo (yellow card) 45+3'; Turitsov (yellow card) 46'	Stadium: Stadion Lokomotiv; Referee: Stanimir Trenchev (Sofia); Man of the Match: Michael Estrada

7 October 2023 13	CSKA	1−1	Levski	Sofia
14:45 UTC+3	Lindseth 49'; Heintz (yellow card) 54'; Youga (yellow card) 75'; Estrada (yellow card) 75'; Carreazo (yellow card) 90+2'	Report	Ronaldo 43'; Mitkov (yellow card) 48'; Ricardinho (yellow card) 75'; K. Dimitrov (yellow card) 75'; Bachev (yellow card) 90+7'	Stadium: Natsionalen stadion Vasil Levski; Attendance: 17,532; Referee: Radoslav Gidzhenov (Plovdiv); Man of the Match: Jonathan Lindseth

21 October 2023 14	Pirin	1−2	CSKA	Blagoevgrad
19:00 UTC+3	Tyutyukov (yellow card) 5'; Abou (yellow card) 22' (yellow-red card) 84'; Tasev 45+1', (yellow card) 75'; Semeniv (yellow card) 57'	Report	Mahmutović (yellow card) 3'; Lindseth (yellow card) 25', (goal) 80'; Nazon (yellow card) 42'; Phaëton 79'; Asprilla (yellow card) 82'	Stadium: Stadion Hristo Botev; Referee: Dragomir Draganov (Varna); Man of the Match: Matthias Phaëton

27 October 2023 15	CSKA	0−0	Arda	Sofia
16:30 UTC+3	Šakić (yellow card) 19'; Turitsov (yellow card) 82'; Mahmutović (yellow card) 90+1'	Report	Ebenezer (yellow card) 57'; Tetah (yellow card) 64'; Kotev (yellow card) 78'; Krachunov (yellow card) 88'; Hüseynov (yellow card) 90+2'	Stadium: Stadion Balgarska Armia; Referee: Georgi Ginchev (Veliko Tarnovo); Man of the Match: Stanislav Ivanov

1 November 2023 3	Etar	0−1	CSKA	Veliko Tarnovo
17:00 UTC+2	Ivanov (yellow card) 24'; Y. Angelov (yellow card) 74'; Bakalov (yellow card) 80'; Knežević (yellow card) 90+6'	Report	Estrada (yellow card) 45+5'; Carreazo 49'; Youga (red card) 60'; Šakić (yellow card) 84'; Phaëton (yellow card) 90+6'	Stadium: Stadion Ivaylo; Attendance: 6,214; Referee: Ivelin Zanev (Ruse); Man of the Match: Gustavo Busatto
Note: The game has been originally scheduled for 29 July 2023, but has been rescheduled due to CSKA's ongoing participation in the 2023–24 UEFA Europa Conference League. On 10 October the technical committee of the BFU rescheduled the game for 1 November 2023.

6 November 2023 16	CSKA	3−0	Hebar	Sofia
18:00 UTC+2	Phaëton 45+1'; Estrada 59'; Shopov 90+1'	Report	Mihaylov (yellow card) 18'; Valchev (yellow card) 33'; Isuf (yellow card) 49'; Marin (yellow card) 65'	Stadium: Stadion Balgarska Armia; Referee: Ivo Andreev (Sofia); Man of the Match: Stanislav Shopov

12 November 2023 17	Krumovgrad	1−4	CSKA	Plovdiv (Note: Krumovgrad plays their league home games at Sporten kompleks Nikola Shterev - Starika, Plovdiv, instead of their regular stadium Stadion Krumovgrad, Krumovgrad, which does not meet the BFU requirements.)
13:00 UTC+2	Granado (yellow card) 27'; Kolev 34'	Report	Youga 38', (yellow card) 80'; El Maestro (yellow card) 69'; Petrov 78'; Asprilla (yellow card) 81', (goal) 83'; Carreazo 90+1'	Stadium: Sporten kompleks Nikola Shterev - Starika; Attendance: 1,369; Referee: Radoslav Gidzhenov (Plovdiv); Man of the Match: Hristiyan Petrov

25 November 2023 18	CSKA	2−0	Etar	Sofia
17:30 UTC+2	Lindseth 84'; Petrov 86'	Report	Aleksandrov (red card) 13'; Dimov (yellow card) 14'	Stadium: Stadion Balgarska Armia; Referee: Kristiyan Kolev (Plovdiv); Man of the Match: Jonathan Lindseth
Note: The game has been interrupted at halftime due to heavy snowfall. It has been played to an end on 26 November 2023 at 17:30 EET. The game restared with an hour delay of the initial time to ensure the proper cleaning of the pitch.

1 December 2023 19	Slavia	1−1	CSKA	Sofia
17:30 UTC+2	Nikolov (yellow card) 37'; Tasev (yellow card) 38'; Kerchev (yellow card) 46'; Genev (yellow card) 54'; Raychev 86'; Vutsov (yellow card) 90+7'	Report	El Maestro (yellow card) 39'; Vion (yellow card) 62'; Shopov (yellow card) 85'; Georgiev 67' (o.g.)	Stadium: Stadion Aleksandar Shalamanov; Attendance: 2,500; Referee: Stanimir Trenchev (Sofia); Man of the Match: Roberto Raychev

10 December 2023 20	CSKA	0−1	Ludogorets	Sofia
17:45 UTC+2	Vion (yellow card) 15'; Carreazo (yellow card) 38'; Córdoba (yellow card) 40'; Busatto (yellow card) 90+21'	Report	Naressi (yellow card) 30'; Caio Vidal (yellow card) 64'; Gonçalves (yellow card) 86'; Delev 90+18'; Padt (yellow card) 90+24'; Rick (yellow card) 90+25'	Stadium: Stadion Balgarska Armia; Referee: Dragomir Draganov (Varna); Man of the Match: Spas Delev

18 February 2024 21	CSKA	3−0	Botev Vratsa	Sofia
17:45 UTC+2	Vion 21', 61', (yellow card) 49'; Phaëton (yellow card) 22'; Heintz 36'; Youga (yellow card) 68'	Report	Georgiev (yellow card) 75'	Stadium: Natsionalen stadion Vasil Levski (Note: From the spring of 2024 CSKA plays their home games at Natsionalen stadion Vasil Levski, Sofia, instead of their regular stadium Stadion Balgarska Armia, Sofia, which is undergoing a major reconstruction.); Attendance: 2,344; Referee: Radoslav Gidzhenov (Plovdiv); Man of the Match: Thibaut Vion

24 February 2024 22	Cherno More	1−0	CSKA	Varna
15:15 UTC+2	Popov (yellow card) 29'; Isa (yellow card) 45'; Soula (yellow card) 78' (yellow-red card) 83'; Atanasov 88'; Iliev (yellow card) 90+2'; Dyulgerov (yellow card) 90+3'	Report	Karanga (yellow card) 14' (red card) 73'; Mattheij (yellow card) 45'; Busatto (yellow card) 74'	Stadium: Stadion Ticha; Attendance: 10,000; Referee: Valentin Zhelezov (Burgas); Man of the Match: Zhivko Atanasov

3 March 2024 23	CSKA	3−0	Beroe	Sofia
14:30 UTC+2	Shopov 3', 48'; Phaëton 32'; Mahmutović (yellow card) 89'	Report	Espinoza (yellow card) 7'; Mingo (red card) 17'; Villa (yellow card) 42'; Algarra (yellow card) 90+1'	Stadium: Natsionalen stadion Vasil Levski; Referee: Georgi Kabakov (Plovdiv); Man of the Match: Stanislav Shopov

9 March 2024 24	CSKA 1948	1−2	CSKA	Bistritsa
15:00 UTC+2	Serdyuk 11'; Piščević (yellow card) 36' (yellow-red card) 45'; Vutov (yellow card) 90+4'	Report	Vion (yellow card) 45+2'; Asprilla 66'; Skarsem 90+4'; Šakić (yellow card) 90+7'	Stadium: Stadion Bistritsa; Attendance: 3,199; Referee: Ivo Andreev (Sofia); Man of the Match: Olaus Skarsem

17 March 2024 25	CSKA	4−0	Botev Plovdiv	Sofia
17:45 UTC+2	Lindseth 25'; Karanga 33', 42'; Skarsem (yellow card) 64'; Phaëton 65'; Antonov (yellow card) 90+2'; Shopov (yellow card) 90+3'	Report	Nikolov (yellow card) 5'; Papazov (yellow card) 36'; Perera (yellow card) 41'; Brahimi (yellow card) 81'	Stadium: Natsionalen stadion Vasil Levski; Attendance: 3,788; Referee: Ivaylo Stoyanov (Petrich); Man of the Match: Fernando Karanga

30 March 2024 26	Lokomotiv Sofia	0−1	CSKA	Sofia
19:00 UTC+3	Miloshev (yellow card) 41'; França (yellow card) 57'; Naydenov (yellow card) 66'	Report	Lindseth 17'; Youga (yellow card) 41'; Karanga (yellow card) 43'; Mahmutović (yellow card) 48'; Šakić (yellow card) 55'	Stadium: Stadion Lokomotiv; Attendance: 5,056; Referee: Vladimir Valkov (Plovdiv); Man of the Match: Jonathan Lindseth

3 April 2024 27	CSKA	1−2	Lokomotiv Plovdiv	Sofia
17:00 UTC+3	Phaëton (yellow card) 72'; Asprilla 73'	Report	Kamdem (yellow card) 40'; Segura (yellow card) 49'; Ntelo 60'; Peshov 90+3'	Stadium: Natsionalen stadion Vasil Levski; Referee: Volen Chinkov (Sofia); Man of the Match: Mitchy Ntelo

7 April 2024 28	Levski	0−2	CSKA	Sofia
14:45 UTC+3	Andonov (yellow card) 24'	Report	Heintz 61'; Karanga 77', (yellow card) 78'; Lindseth (yellow card) 86'	Stadium: Natsionalen stadion Vasil Levski; Attendance: 25,556; Referee: Dragomir Draganov (Varna); Man of the Match: Tobias Heintz

12 April 2024 29	CSKA	1−2	Pirin	Sofia
20:15 UTC+3	Karanga 26', (yellow card) 45+2'; Phaëton (yellow card) 74'	Report	Jagodinskis 14'; Tasev 79'; Kirev (yellow card) 80'; Esalo (yellow card) 90+4'; Kovalyov (yellow card) 90+5'	Stadium: Natsionalen stadion Vasil Levski; Attendance: 2,678; Referee: Petar Kuzev (Gabrovo); Man of the Match: Ivan Tasev

21 April 2024 30	Arda	2−3	CSKA	Kardzhali
20:15 UTC+3	Tsonev 19'; Ivanov 21', (yellow card) 23'; Tetah (yellow card) 34'	Report	Mattheij 12', (yellow card) 61'; Phaëton (yellow card) 35'; Heintz 58'; Skarsem 67'; De Nooijer (yellow card) 90+2'	Stadium: Arena Arda; Referee: Valentin Zhelezov (Burgas); Man of the Match: Olaus Skarsem

==== Championship round ====
===== League table =====
Pos	Team	Pld	W	D	L	GF	GA	GD	Pts	Qualification
1	Ludogorets Razgrad (C)	35	26	4	5	87	24	+63	82	Qualification for the Champions League first qualifying round
2	Cherno More	35	22	9	4	56	26	+30	75	Qualification for the Conference League second qualifying round
3	CSKA Sofia	35	20	7	8	56	27	+29	67	Qualification for the Conference League play-off
4	Levski Sofia	35	19	7	9	50	30	+20	64	
5	Lokomotiv Plovdiv	35	17	7	11	53	44	+9	58	
6	Krumovgrad	35	13	10	12	45	45	0	49	

Source: Soccerway, Bulgarian Football
Rules for classification: 1) Points; 2) Head-to-head points; 3) Head-to-head goal difference; 4) Head-to-head goals scored; 5) Head-to-head away goals scored (only if two teams); 6) Goal difference; 7) Goals scored; 8) Fairplay ranking; 9) Draw.
(C) Champions

===== Results summary =====
Overall								Home						Away					
Pld	W	D	L	GF	GA	GD	Pts	W	D	L	GF	GA	GD	W	D	L	GF	GA	GD
5	1	1	3	6	8	−2	4	1	1	1	5	4	+1	0	0	2	1	4	−3

Last updated: 26 May 2024.
Source: See results

===== Results by round =====
Round	1	2	3	4	5
Ground	H	A	H	H	A
Result	W	L	D	L	L
Position	2	3	3	3	3

Updated to match(es) played on 26 May 2024. Source: See Results
A = Away; H = Home; W = Win; D = Draw; L = Loss

===== Results =====
27 April 2024 31	CSKA	3−1	Levski	Sofia
16:15 UTC+3	Sanyang (yellow card) 15'; Skarsem 25'; Lindseth 36'; Mattheij (yellow card) 44'; Carreazo 45'; Karanga (yellow card) 45+1'	Report	El Jemili (yellow card) 29'; Kostov (yellow card) 29'; Fadiga 61'; Córdoba (yellow card) 66'	Stadium: Natsionalen stadion Vasil Levski; Attendance: 11,948; Referee: Georgi Kabakov (Plovdiv); Man of the Match: Olaus Skarsem

11 May 2024 32	Ludogorets	3−1	CSKA	Razgrad
19:30 UTC+3	Duah 2', 57' (pen.), (yellow card) 60'; Nedyalkov 48'; Tekpetey (red card) 60'; Almeida (yellow card) 90+2'	Report	Córdoba (yellow card) 34'; Karanga 34', (red card) 60'; Youga (yellow card) 60'; De Nooijer (yellow card) 64'; Asprilla (yellow card) 80'; Carreazo (yellow card) 82'	Stadium: Huvepharma Arena; Attendance: 6,329; Referee: Volen Chinkov (Sofia); Man of the Match: Anton Nedyalkov

18 May 2024 33	CSKA	2−2	Krumovgrad	Sofia
17:45 UTC+3	Lindseth 29', (penalty missed) 43'; Phaëton 49'; Asprilla (yellow card) 82'; Chorbadzhiyski (yellow card) 86'	Report	Luan 3', 55'; Kolev (yellow card) 87'; Velyev (yellow card) 90+1'	Stadium: Natsionalen stadion Vasil Levski; Referee: Ivo Andreev (Sofia); Man of the Match: Patrick Luan

23 May 2024 34	CSKA	0−1	Cherno More	Sofia
20:15 UTC+3	Skarsem (yellow card) 36'; Heintz (yellow card) 38'; Busatto (red card) 50'	Report	Weslen (yellow card) 34'; Calcan (yellow card) 48'; Álvarez 57'; Atanasov (yellow card) 62'; Dyulgerov (yellow card) 88'	Stadium: Natsionalen stadion Vasil Levski; Referee: Georgi Kabakov (Plovdiv); Man of the Match: Daniel Dimov

26 May 2024 35	Lokomotiv Plovdiv	1−0	CSKA	Plovdiv
20:30 UTC+3	Andreev 5'; Segura (yellow card) 77'	Report	Turitsov (yellow card) 46'; Sanyang (yellow card) 90+3'	Stadium: Stadion Lokomotiv; Referee: Lyuboslav Lyubomirov (Sofia); Man of the Match: Martin Lukov

==== European play-off final ====
31 May 2024	CSKA	0−2	CSKA 1948	Sofia
19:00 UTC+3	Córdoba (yellow card) 13'; Phaëton (yellow card) 83'	Report	Piščević 30'; Pedrinho 53', (yellow card) 54'; Marinov (yellow card) 64'; Karagaren (yellow card) 73'	Stadium: Natsionalen stadion Vasil Levski; Referee: Dragomir Draganov (Varna); Man of the Match: Pedrinho

=== Bulgarian Cup ===
9 November 2023 1R	Chernomorets	0−3	CSKA	Balchik
17:30 UTC+2	Georgiev (yellow card) 70'; Fonkeu (yellow card) 87'	Report	Asprilla 2', 42'; Lindseth 89'; Nazon (yellow card) 90'	Stadium: Stadion Balchik; Attendance: 3,056; Referee: Kristiyan Kolev (Plovdiv)

5 December 2023 2R	Slavia	0−1	CSKA	Sofia
17:30 UTC+2	Aleksandrov (yellow card) 45+1'; Ivanov (yellow card) 45+4'; Tasev (yellow card) 53'	Report	Sanyang (yellow card) 4'; Phaëton 27'; Youga (yellow card) 34'; Heintz (yellow card) 55'; Córdoba (yellow card) 58'; Busatto (yellow card) 65'; Evtimov (yellow card) 90+5'	Stadium: Stadion Aleksandar Shalamanov; Attendance: 2,500; Referee: Nikola Popov (Sofia)

28 February 2024 QF	CSKA	1−0	Arda	Sofia
17:30 UTC+2	Youga 19', (yellow card) 90+4'	Report	Lozev (yellow card) 90'	Stadium: Natsionalen stadion Vasil Levski; Referee: Stanimir Trenchev (Sofia)

17 April 2024 SF Leg 1	CSKA	0−1	Botev Plovdiv	Sofia
19:00 UTC+3	Mattheij (yellow card) 58'; Córdoba (red card) 62'; Carreazo (yellow card) 87'	Report	Emmanuel 46'; Popov (red card) 62'; Hankić (yellow card) 83'; Eto'o (yellow card) 88'; Minkov (yellow card) 90+8'	Stadium: Natsionalen stadion Vasil Levski; Referee: Dragomir Draganov (Varna)

1 May 2024 SF Leg 2	Botev Plovdiv	2−0 (3−0 agg.)	CSKA	Plovdiv
18:45 UTC+3	Popov 4', (yellow card) 31'; Minkov (yellow card) 29'; Eto'o (yellow card) 48'; Brahimi (yellow card) 56'; Conte (yellow card) 69'; Perera (yellow card) 76'; Mertens 82', (yellow card) 83'	Report	Youga (yellow card) 28'; Sanyang (yellow card) 29'; Lindseth (yellow card) 69'; Carreazo (yellow card) 89'	Stadium: Stadion Hristo Botev; Attendance: 16,233; Referee: Volen Chinkov (Sofia)

=== UEFA Europa Conference League ===
==== Second qualifying round ====
27 July 2023 First leg	CSKA (Bulgaria)	0−2	(Romania) Sepsi OSK	Sofia, Bulgaria
20:00 UTC+3	Vion (yellow card) 47'; Mahmutović (yellow card) 71'; Shopov (yellow card) 88'; Phaëton (yellow card) 89'	Report	Alimi (yellow card) 26'; Gheorghe (yellow card) 38'; Păun 68'; Varga 81'; Niczuly (yellow card) 89'	Stadium: Stadion Balgarska Armia; Attendance: 7,966; Referee: Jochem Kamphuis (Netherlands)

3 August 2023 Second leg	Sepsi OSK (Romania)	4−0 (6−0 agg.)	(Bulgaria) CSKA	Sfântu Gheorghe, Romania
20:00 UTC+3	Dumitrescu (yellow card) 11'; Ștefănescu (yellow card) 18'; Matei 19' (pen.); Šafranko (yellow card) 62'; Aganović 70'; Varga 90'; Alimi 90+5' (pen.)	Report	Phaëton (yellow card) 14'; Nazon (yellow card) 18'; Mahmutović (yellow card) 43'; Turitsov (yellow card) 64'; Shaghoyan (yellow card) 80'; Shopov (yellow card) 85'; Carreazo (yellow card) 90+3' (yellow-red card) 90+7'	Stadium: Stadionul Sepsi Arena; Attendance: 8,270; Referee: Eldorjan Hamiti (Albania)

== Statistics ==
=== Appearances and goals ===
As of 31 May 2024

No.	Pos	Player	Parva Liga		Bulgarian Cup		Conference League		Total	
No.	Pos	Player	Apps	Goals	Apps	Goals	Apps	Goals	Apps	Goals
1	GK	(Brazil) Gustavo Busatto	33	-25	4	-3	2	-6	39	-34
2	DF	(Netherlands) Jurgen Mattheij	5+1	1	3	0	0	0	9	1
3	DF	(The Gambia) Sainey Sanyang	11+5	0	3	0	1+1	0	21	0
4	DF	(Netherlands) Menno Koch	6+12	0	0+1	0	2	0	21	0
5	DF	(Netherlands) Bradley de Nooijer	1+3	0	0+1	0	0	0	5	0
6	DF	(Bulgaria) Hristiyan Petrov	30	2	3	0	0	0	33	2
7	MF	(Norway) Olaus Skarsem	12+3	3	2	0	0	0	17	3
8	MF	(Bulgaria) Stanislav Shopov	7+20	3	1+3	0	0+2	0	33	3
9	FW	(Brazil) Fernando Karanga	11	5	0	0	0	0	11	5
10	MF	(Norway) Jonathan Lindseth	33+2	9	4+1	1	2	0	42	10
11	FW	(Guadeloupe) Matthias Phaëton	27+6	5	3+1	1	2	0	39	6
12	GK	(Bulgaria) Marin Orlinov	0	0	0	0	0	0	0	0
13	DF	(Colombia) Brayan Córdoba	19+3	0	4	0	2	0	28	0
14	MF	(Norway) Tobias Heintz	29+4	6	5	0	2	0	40	6
15	DF	(France) Thibaut Vion	28+5	2	3+1	0	1+1	0	39	2
16	MF	(Bulgaria) Georgi Chorbadzhiyski	1+5	0	0+1	0	0	0	7	0
17	DF	(Austria) Emanuel Šakić	10+12	0	2+2	0	0	0	26	0
19	DF	(Bulgaria) Ivan Turitsov	19+5	0	3	0	2	0	29	0
20	DF	(Bulgaria) Martin Stoychev	2+2	0	0+1	0	0	0	5	0
21	MF	(Central African Republic) Amos Youga	28	1	5	1	0	0	33	2
22	DF	(Luxembourg) Enes Mahmutović	16+4	0	2	0	2	0	24	0
23	MF	(Bulgaria) Ilian Antonov	0+3	0	0+1	0	0	0	4	0
24	MF	(Bulgaria) Petko Panayotov	0+2	0	0	0	0	0	2	0
25	GK	(Bulgaria) Dimitar Evtimov	3+1	-4	1+1	0	0	0	6	-4
26	MF	(Colombia) Marcelino Carreazo	30	3	3+2	0	2	0	37	3
27	MF	(Serbia) Lazar Tufegdžić	0+5	1	0	0	0	0	5	1
28	DF	(Bulgaria) Nasko Tsekov	0+1	0	0	0	0	0	1	0
30	FW	(Colombia) Danilo Asprilla	2+22	3	3+2	2	0+1	0	30	5
Players who appeared for CSKA Sofia that left during the season:
9	FW	(Haiti) Duckens Nazon	16+2	7	1+1	0	2	0	22	7
10	MF	(Armenia) Zhirayr Shaghoyan	5+3	0	0	0	0+2	0	10	0
20	DF	(Bulgaria) Asen Donchev	2+2	0	0+1	0	0+1	0	6	0
24	FW	(Bulgaria) Mark-Emilio Papazov	1+2	0	0	0	0	0	3	0
28	FW	(Colombia) Brayan Moreno	0+3	0	0	0	0	0	3	0
29	FW	(Ecuador) Michael Estrada	9+8	4	1	0	0+1	0	19	4

=== Goalscorers ===
Place	Position	Nation	Number	Name	Parva Liga	Bulgarian Cup	Conference League	Total
1	MF	(Norway)	7/10	Jonathan Lindseth	9	1	0	10
2	FW	(Haiti)	9	Duckens Nazon	7	0	0	7
3	FW	(Guadeloupe)	11	Matthias Phaëton	5	1	0	6
3	MF	(Norway)	14	Tobias Heintz	6	0	0	6
5	FW	(Brazil)	9	Fernando Karanga	5	0	0	5
5	FW	(Colombia)	30	Danilo Asprilla	3	2	0	5
7	FW	(Ecuador)	29	Michael Estrada	4	0	0	4
8	MF	(Norway)	7	Olaus Skarsem	3	0	0	3
8	MF	(Bulgaria)	8	Stanislav Shopov	3	0	0	3
8	MF	(Colombia)	26	Marcelino Carreazo	3	0	0	3
11	DF	(Bulgaria)	6	Hristiyan Petrov	2	0	0	2
11	DF	(France)	15	Thibaut Vion	2	0	0	2
11	MF	(Central African Republic)	21	Amos Youga	1	1	0	2
14	DF	(Netherlands)	2	Jurgen Mattheij	1	0	0	1
14	MF	(Serbia)	27	Lazar Tufegdžić	1	0	0	1
				Own goal	1	0	0	0
TOTALS					56	5	0	61

As of 31 May 2024

=== Disciplinary record ===
Includes all competitive matches. Players listed below made at least one appearance for CSKA first squad during the season.

N	P	Nat.	Name	Parva Liga			Bulgarian Cup			Conference League			Total			Notes
N	P	Nat.	Name	Yellow card	Second yellow card	Red card	Yellow card	Second yellow card	Red card	Yellow card	Second yellow card	Red card	Yellow card	Second yellow card	Red card	Notes
1	GK	(Brazil)	Gustavo Busatto	5		1	1						6		1	
2	DF	(Netherlands)	Jurgen Mattheij	3			1						4			
3	DF	(The Gambia)	Sainey Sanyang	4			2						6			
5	DF	(Netherlands)	Bradley de Nooijer	2									2			
6	DF	(Bulgaria)	Hristiyan Petrov	3									3			
7	MF	(Norway)	Olaus Skarsem	2									2			
8	MF	(Bulgaria)	Stanislav Shopov	4						2			6			
9	FW	(Brazil)	Fernando Karanga	4		2							4		2	
9	FW	(Haiti)	Duckens Nazon	2			1			1			4			
10	MF	(Norway)	Jonathan Lindseth	4			1						5			
10	MF	(Armenia)	Zhirayr Shaghoyan	1						1			2			
11	FW	(Guadeloupe)	Matthias Phaëton	7						2			9			
13	DF	(Colombia)	Brayan Córdoba	4			1		1				5		1	
14	MF	(Norway)	Tobias Heintz	3			1						4			
15	DF	(France)	Thibaut Vion	8						1			9			
16	MF	(Bulgaria)	Georgi Chorbadzhiyski	1									1			
17	DF	(Austria)	Emanuel Šakić	4									4			
19	DF	(Bulgaria)	Ivan Turitsov	4						1			5			
21	MF	(Central African Republic)	Amos Youga	8		1	3						11		1	
22	DF	(Luxembourg)	Enes Mahmutović	4						2			6			
23	MF	(Bulgaria)	Ilian Antonov	1									1			
25	GK	(Bulgaria)	Dimitar Evtimov				1						1			
26	MF	(Colombia)	Marcelino Carreazo	6			2			1	1		9	1		
29	FW	(Ecuador)	Michael Estrada	2									2			
30	FW	(Colombia)	Danilo Asprilla	4									4			
Manager		(England)	Nestor El Maestro	2									2			

Last updated: 31 May 2024
Source: Competitive matches
Only competitive matches
(yellow card) = Number of bookings; (second yellow card) = Number of sending offs after a second yellow card; (red card) = Number of sending offs by a direct red card.

== See also ==
- PFC CSKA Sofia
