= Thibaut Vion =

French footballer (born 1993)

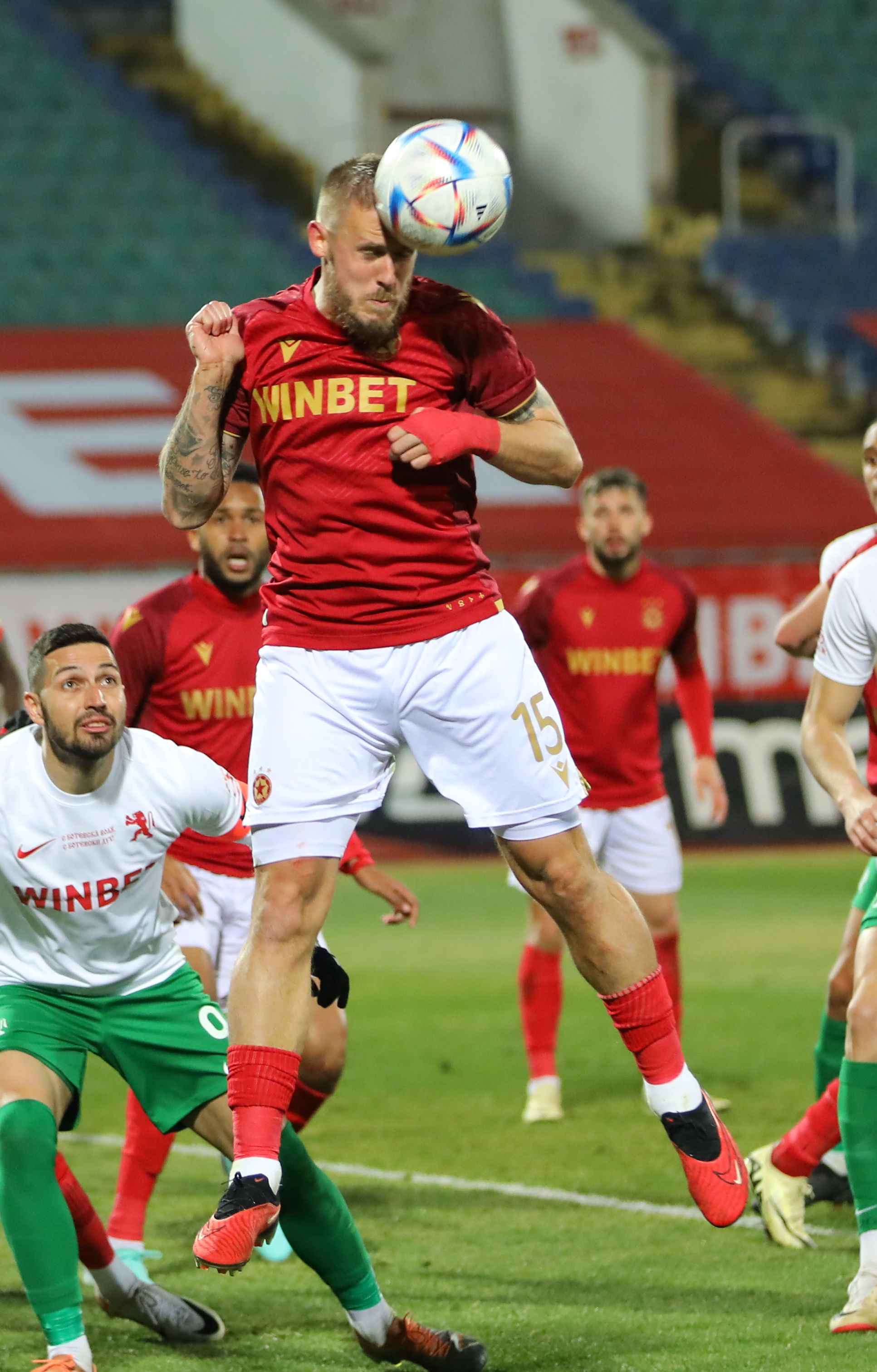
- Vion in CSKA, 2024-2-18

Personal information
- Full name: Thibaut Vion
- Date of birth: 11 December 1993 (age 32)
- Place of birth: Mont-Saint-Martin, France
- Height: 1.85 m (6 ft 1 in)
- Positions: Right back; defensive midfielder

Team information
- Current team: Progrès Niederkorn
- Number: 15

Youth career
- 1999–2002: US Lexy
- 2002–2011: Metz
- 2011–2012: Porto

Senior career*
Years	Team	Apps	(Gls)
2012–2014	Porto B	43	(3)
2014–2017	Metz	29	(2)
2015–2016	→ Seraing (loan)	15	(2)
2017–2020	Chamois Niortais	73	(4)
2020–2025	CSKA Sofia	139	(7)
2026–	Progrès Niederkorn	12	(1)

International career
2011–2012	France U19	11	(3)
2012–2013	France U20	8	(1)
Medal record
Representing France
Men's Football
FIFA U-20 World Cup
Winner	2013 Turkey
- * Club domestic league appearances and goals as of 13 June 2026

Thibaut Vion (born 11 December 1993) is a French professional footballer who plays as a right back for Progrès Niederkorn. He has been capped at international level playing in the U19 and U20 squads.

== Club career ==
As 17 years old, Vion joined Portuguese club F.C. Porto from the youth academy of Metz, for a fee of €300,000. He expressed that he did not know Portuguese so had to learn it and on top of that he did not speak English well. He made his debut for Porto B against Tondela in a 2–2 draw.

On 31 January 2014, Vion returned to France, joining Metz on a 4.5 years contract. As part of a partnership between Metz and Seraing, Vion was loan to Proximus League club for the 2015–16 season.

On 30 August 2017, he joined French Ligue 2 club Chamois Niortais on a three-year contract.

In August 2020, he joined Bulgarian club CSKA Sofia.

== International career ==
Vion played at the 2012 UEFA U19 Championship. He was selected for France U20 in the 2013 FIFA U-20 World Cup. In the group stage 2–1 defeat against Spain U20 he came on as a 78th-minute substitute for Florian Thauvin and scored his debut goal in the 90+1 minute.

== Career statistics ==
=== Club ===
As of matches played 22 March 2026

Appearances and goals by club, season and competition
Club	Season	League			Cup		League Cup		Europe		Other		Total	
Club	Season	Division	Apps	Goals	Apps	Goals	Apps	Goals	Apps	Goals	Apps	Goals	Apps	Goals
Porto B	2012–13	Liga de Honra	34	1	0	0	0	0	0	0	—		34	1
Porto B	2013–14	Liga de Honra	9	2	0	0	0	0	0	0	—		9	2
Porto B	Total		43	3	0	0	4	1	0	0	0	0	43	3
Metz	2013–14	Ligue 2	11	0	0	0	0	0	0	0	—		11	0
Metz	2014–15	Ligue 1	5	0	0	0	2	1	0	0	—		7	1
Metz	2015–16	Ligue 2	0	0	0	0	0	0	0	0	—		0	0
Metz	2016–17	Ligue 1	13	2	1	0	2	0	0	0	—		16	3
Metz	Total		29	2	1	0	4	1	0	0	0	0	34	5
Seraing (loan)	2015–16	Proximus League	15	2	0	0	0	0	0	0	—		15	2
Chamois Niortais	2017–18	Ligue 2	25	2	1	0	0	0	0	0	—		26	2
Chamois Niortais	2018–19	Ligue 2	27	0	3	1	1	0	0	0	—		31	1
Chamois Niortais	2019–20	Ligue 2	21	2	2	0	3	0	0	0	—		26	2
Chamois Niortais	Total		73	4	6	1	4	0	0	0	0	0	83	5
CSKA Sofia	2020–21	First League	19	2	3	0	—		5	0	—		27	2
CSKA Sofia	2021–22	First League	19	0	4	0	—		4	0	—		27	0
CSKA Sofia	2022–23	First League	34	0	2	0	—		6	0	—		42	0
CSKA Sofia	2023–24	First League	32	2	4	0	—		2	0	1	0	39	2
CSKA Sofia	2024–25	First League	32	3	6	0	—		—		1	0	39	3
CSKA Sofia	2025–26	First League	3	0	0	0	—		—		—		3	0
CSKA Sofia	Total		139	7	19	0	0	0	17	0	2	0	177	7
Progrès Niederkorn	2025–26	BGL Ligue	7	0	1	0	—		—		—		8	0
Career total			306	17	27	1	8	1	17	0	2	0	360	20

== Honours ==
CSKA Sofia

- Bulgarian Cup: 2020–21
