= Brayan Córdoba =

Colombian footballer (born 1999)

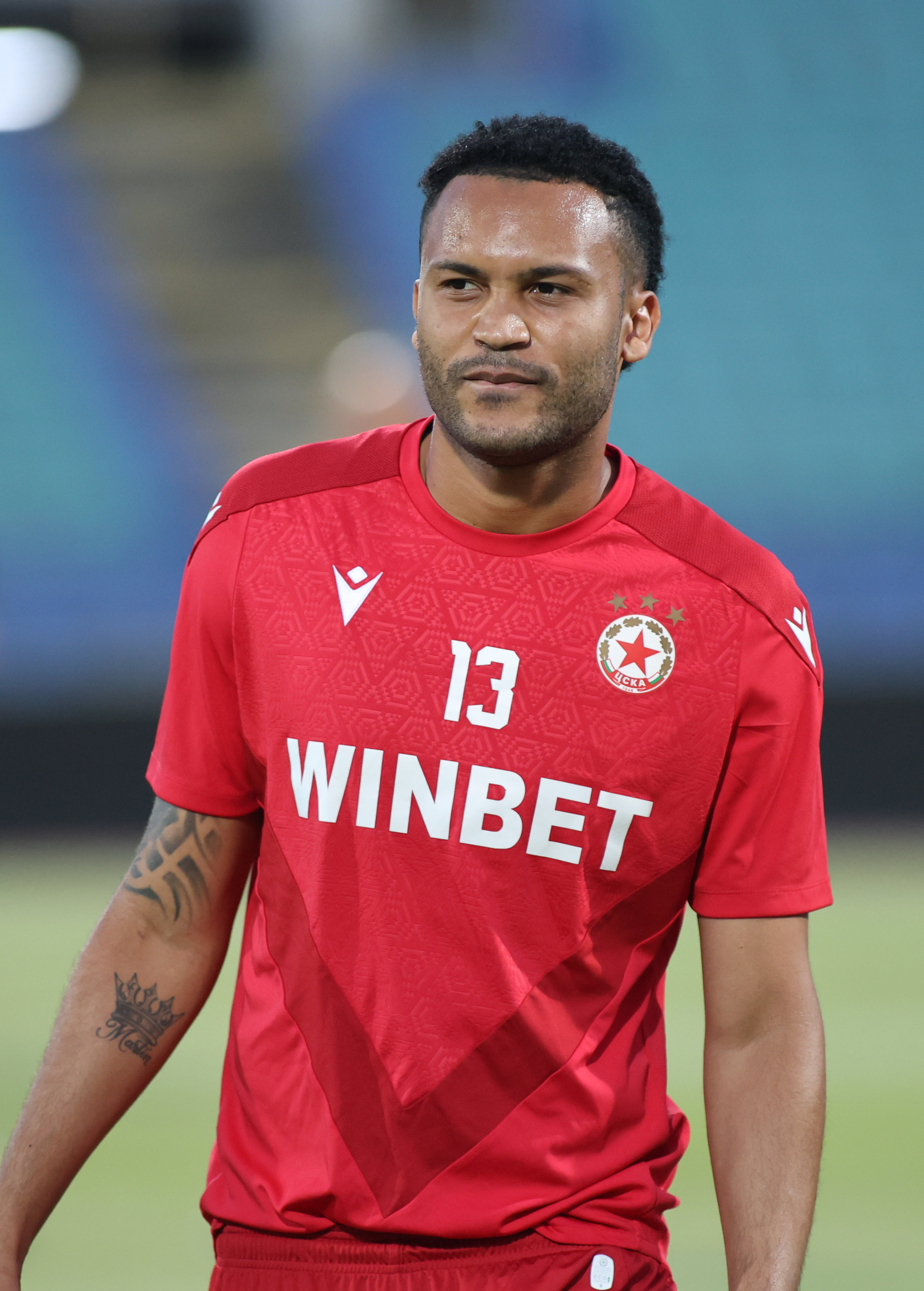

Personal information
- Full name: Brayan Stiven Córdoba Barrientos
- Date of birth: 18 September 1999 (age 27)
- Place of birth: Unguía, Colombia
- Height: 1.91 m (6 ft 3 in)
- Position: Centre back

Team information
- Current team: Cúcuta Deportivo
- Number: 44

Youth career
- –2018: Atlético Nacional

Senior career*
Years	Team	Apps	(Gls)
2018–2022	Atlético Nacional	26	(0)
2022	→ Once Caldas (loan)	18	(1)
2023	América de Cali	23	(0)
2023–2026	CSKA Sofia	34	(0)
2024–2026	CSKA Sofia II	7	(0)
2026–	Cúcuta Deportivo	0	(0)
- * Club domestic league appearances and goals as of 10:12, 24 December 2025 (UTC)

Brayan Stiven Córdoba Barrientos (born 18 September 1999) is a Colombian professional footballer who plays as a centre back for Cúcuta Deportivo.

== Career ==
Córdoba was transferred to CSKA Sofia during the summer of 2023.

== Career statistics ==
As of 29 October 2025

Appearances and goals by club, season and competition
Club	Season	League			National cup		Continental		Other		Total	
Club	Season	Division	Apps	Goals	Apps	Goals	Apps	Goals	Apps	Goals	Apps	Goals
Atlético Nacional	2018	Categoría Primera A	0	0	0	0	–		–		0	0
Atlético Nacional	2019	Categoría Primera A	3	0	0	0	–		–		3	0
Atlético Nacional	2020	Categoría Primera A	11	0	2	0	2	0	–		15	0
Atlético Nacional	2021	Categoría Primera A	12	0	0	0	5	0	–		17	0
Atlético Nacional	Total		26	0	2	0	7	0	0	0	35	0
Once Caldas (loan)	2022	Categoría Primera A	18	1	2	0	–		–		20	1
América de Cali	2023	Categoría Primera A	23	0	0	0	–		–		23	0
CSKA Sofia	2023–24	First League	21	0	4	0	2	0	1	0	28	0
CSKA Sofia	2024–25	First League	9	0	2	0	–		0	0	11	0
CSKA Sofia	2025–26	First League	3	0	1	0	–		–		4	0
CSKA Sofia	Total		33	0	7	0	2	0	1	0	43	0
CSKA Sofia II	2024–25	Second League	5	0	–		–		–		5	0
CSKA Sofia II	2025–26	Second League	2	0	–		–		–		2	0
CSKA Sofia II	Total		7	0	0	0	0	0	0	0	7	0
Career total			107	1	11	0	9	0	1	0	128	1
