= Sainey Sanyang =

Gambian footballer (born 2003)

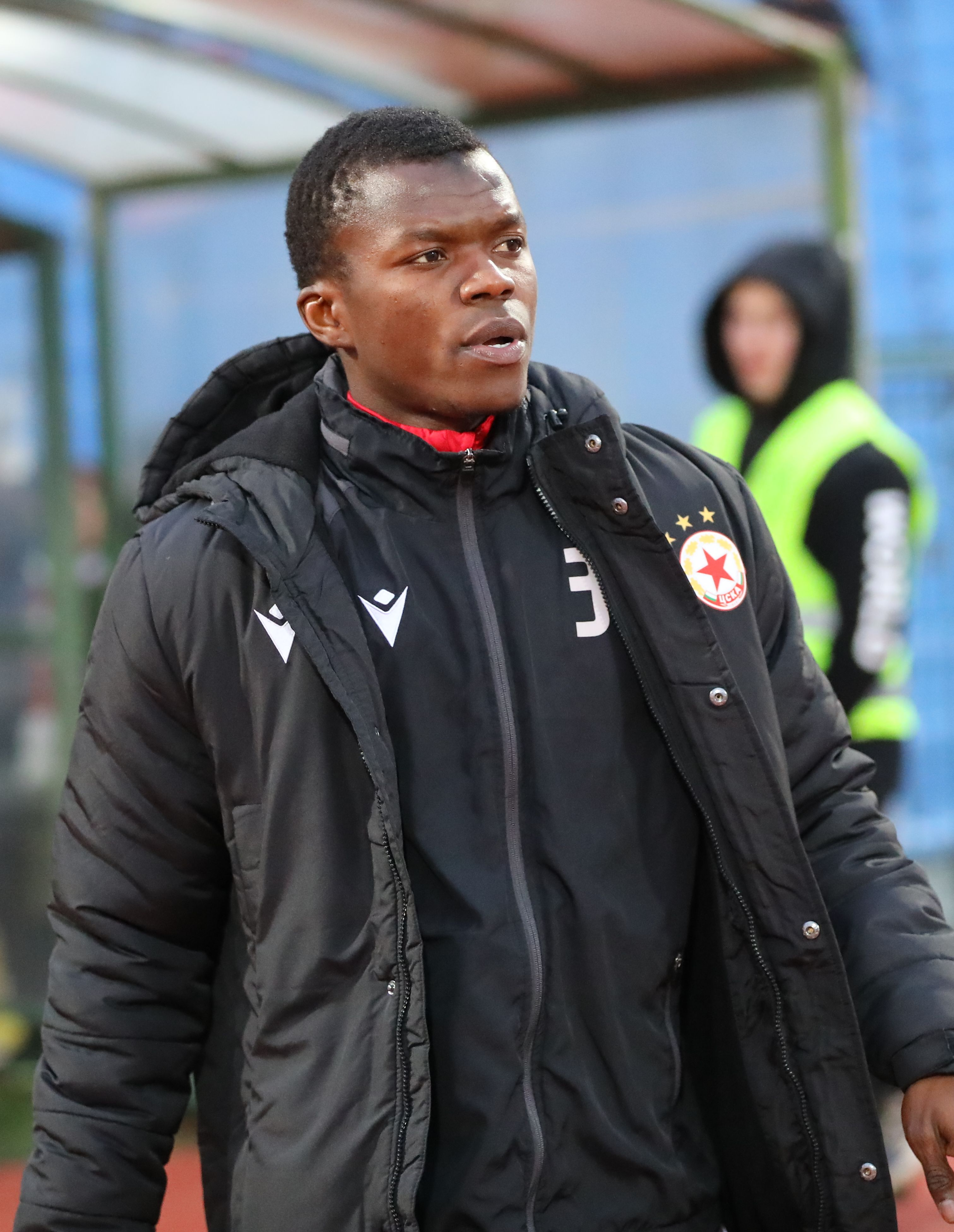

Personal information
- Full name: Sainey Sanyang
- Date of birth: 18 April 2003 (age 23)
- Place of birth: Old Jeswang, The Gambia
- Height: 1.75 m (5 ft 9 in)
- Position: Left back

Team information
- Current team: Botev Vratsa (on loan from CSKA Sofia)
- Number: 3

Youth career
- –2023: Hawks FC

Senior career*
Years	Team	Apps	(Gls)
2023–	CSKA Sofia	38	(2)
2025	CSKA Sofia II	6	(1)
2026–	→ Botev Vratsa (loan)	30	(2)

International career^{‡}
2023	Gambia U20	10	(0)
2025–	Gambia	10	(0)
- * Club domestic league appearances and goals as of 10:35, 14 November 2026 (UTC) ‡ National team caps and goals as of 18:02, 2 October 2026 (UTC)

Sainey Sanyang (born 18 April 2003) is a Gambian professional footballer who plays as a left back for Bulgarian First League club Botev Vratsa on loan from CSKA Sofia and the Gambia national team.

== Career ==
Sanyang was transferred to CSKA Sofia during the summer of 2023.

On 5 September 2025, he earned his first cap for Gambia, playing the full 90 minutes of the 3:1 away victory over Kenya in a 2026 World Cup qualifier.

== Career statistics ==
=== Club ===
As of 7 November 2026

Appearances and goals by club, season and competition
Club	Season	League			National cup		Europe		Other		Total	
Club	Season	Division	Apps	Goals	Apps	Goals	Apps	Goals	Apps	Goals	Apps	Goals
CSKA Sofia	2023–24	First League	15	0	3	0	2	0	1	0	21	0
CSKA Sofia	2024–25	First League	14	2	1	0	–		1	0	16	2
CSKA Sofia	2025–26	First League	9	0	1	1	–		0	0	10	1
CSKA Sofia	Total		38	2	5	1	2	0	2	0	47	3
CSKA Sofia II	2024–25	Second League	5	1	–		–		–		5	1
CSKA Sofia II	2025–26	Second League	1	0	–		–		–		1	0
CSKA Sofia II	Total		6	1	0	0	0	0	0	0	6	1
Botev Vratsa (loan)	2025–26	First League	17	1	1	1	–		–		18	2
Botev Vratsa (loan)	2026–27	First League	13	1	1	0	–		–		14	1
Botev Vratsa (loan)	Total		30	2	2	1	0	0	0	0	32	3
Career total			74	5	7	2	2	0	2	0	85	7

=== International ===
As of match played 29 September 2026

Appearances and goals by national team and year
National team	Year	Apps	Goals
Gambia
Gambia	2025	6	0
Gambia	2026	4	0
Total		10	0

== Honours ==
International

- U-20 Africa Cup of Nations runner-up: 2023
