= Ilian Antonov =

Bulgarian footballer

Personal information
- Full name: Ilian Ilianov Antonov
- Date of birth: 22 May 2005 (age 21)
- Place of birth: Berkovitsa, Bulgaria
- Height: 1.78 m (5 ft 10 in)
- Position: Winger

Team information
- Current team: Slavia Sofia
- Number: 23

Youth career
- 2012–2014: Kom
- 2014–2015: Montana
- 2015–2016: Pretsiz Montana
- 2016–2018: Levski Sofia
- 2018: Wels
- 2018–2020: SV Ried
- 2020–2023: CSKA Sofia

Senior career*
Years	Team	Apps	(Gls)
2022–2026	CSKA Sofia II	93	(12)
2022–2026	CSKA Sofia	9	(0)
2025–2026	CSKA Sofia III	3	(0)
2026–	Slavia Sofia	4	(0)

International career^{‡}
2023	Bulgaria U18	3	(0)
2023	Bulgaria U19	2	(0)
- * Club domestic league appearances and goals as of 11:55, 1 November 2026 (UTC) ‡ National team caps and goals as of 18:02, 23 July 2023 (UTC)

Ilian Ilianov Antonov (Bulgarian: Илиан Илианов Антонов; born 22 May 2005) is a Bulgarian professional footballer who plays as a winger for First League club Slavia Sofia.

== Career ==
As a youth player, he went through the youth academies of Montana, SV Ried and Levski Sofia among others. In 2020, he joined the youth academy of CSKA Sofia.

Antonov made his professional debut in the Bulgarian Cup game against Gigant Saedinenie. He made his debut in the First Professional League against Hebar Pazardzhik on 16 July 2023.

== Career statistics ==
As of 26 October 2026

Appearances and goals by club, season and competition
Club	Season	League			National cup		Europe		Other		Total	
Club	Season	Division	Apps	Goals	Apps	Goals	Apps	Goals	Apps	Goals	Apps	Goals
CSKA Sofia II	2022–23	Third League	25	4	–		–		–		25	4
CSKA Sofia II	2023–24	Third League	24	3	–		–		–		24	3
CSKA Sofia II	2024–25	Second League	18	2	–		–		–		18	2
CSKA Sofia II	2025–26	Second League	26	3	–		–		–		26	3
CSKA Sofia II	Total		93	12	0	0	0	0	0	0	93	12
CSKA Sofia	2022–23	First League	0	0	1	0	–		–		1	0
CSKA Sofia	2023–24	First League	3	0	1	0	0	0	0	0	4	0
CSKA Sofia	2024–25	First League	3	0	1	0	–		–		4	0
CSKA Sofia	2025–26	First League	3	0	0	0	–		–		3	0
CSKA Sofia	Total		9	0	3	0	0	0	0	0	12	0
CSKA Sofia III	2024–25	Third League	3	0	–		–		–		3	0
Slavia Sofia	2026–27	First League	4	0	1	0	–		–		5	0
Career total			109	12	4	0	0	0	0	0	113	12
