= Dzhuneyt Ali =

Bulgarian footballer

Personal information
- Full name: Dzhuneyt Ali Ali
- Date of birth: 5 September 1994 (age 32)
- Place of birth: Kardzhali, Bulgaria
- Height: 1.75 m (5 ft 9 in)
- Position: Right-back

Youth career
- Beroe

Senior career*
Years	Team	Apps	(Gls)
2013–2014	Beroe	0	(0)
2013–2014	→ Botev Galabovo (loan)	17	(0)
2014–2016	Vereya	39	(0)
2016–2019	Nesebar	76	(2)
2019–2020	Neftochimic	19	(1)
2020–2022	Beroe	28	(1)
2022–2023	Arda	23	(0)
2023–2024	Krumovgrad	45	(2)
2025–2026	Lokomotiv Sofia	32	(0)
- * Club domestic league appearances and goals as of 14 October 2026

Dzhuneyt Ali (Bulgarian: Джунейт Али; born 5 September 1994) is a Bulgarian professional footballer who plays as a defender.
