= Marin Orlinov =

Bulgarian footballer

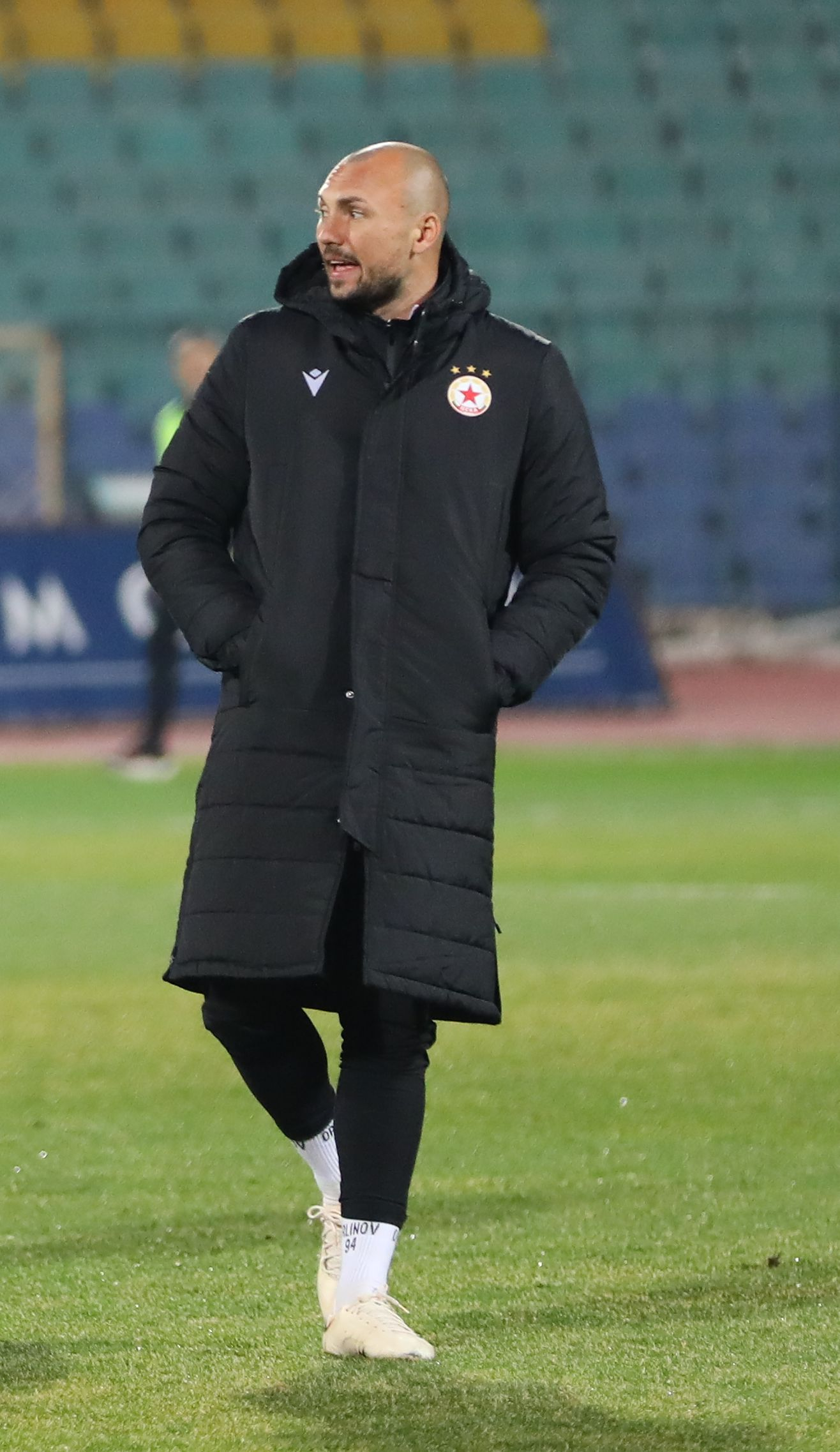

Personal information
- Full name: Marin Aleksandrov Orlinov
- Date of birth: 30 October 1994 (age 32)
- Place of birth: Teteven, Bulgaria
- Height: 1.82 m (5 ft 11 1/2 in)
- Position: Goalkeeper

Team information
- Current team: Botev Vratsa
- Number: 94

Youth career
- 2001–2008: Olimpik Galata
- 2008–2010: Vidima-Rakovski
- 2010–2012: Litex Lovech

Senior career*
Years	Team	Apps	(Gls)
2012–2016	Litex Lovech	0	(0)
2012	→ Chavdar Etropole (loan)	1	(0)
2015	→ Spartak Pleven (loan)	9	(0)
2016–2017	Spartak Pleven	7	(0)
2017	Botev Galabovo	9	(0)
2018–2021	Montana	16	(0)
2021	Neftochimic	21	(0)
2022–2023	Litex Lovech	47	(0)
2023–2026	CSKA Sofia	0	(0)
2024–2026	CSKA Sofia II	31	(0)
2026–	Botev Vratsa	22	(0)
- * Club domestic league appearances and goals as of 15:16, 19 May 2026 (UTC)

Marin Aleksandrov Orlinov (Bulgarian: Марин Орлинов; born 30 October 1994) is a Bulgarian professional footballer who plays as a goalkeeper for Bulgarian First League club Botev Vratsa.

He was a Bulgaria youth international, winning caps at under-21 level.

== Career ==
A product of the Litex Lovech Academy, Orlinov has spent time on loan with Chavdar Etropole and Spartak Pleven, before joining the latter permanently in 2016.

In June 2017 Orlinov joined Botev Galabovo and spent with them the first half of the 2017–18 season. In December 2017 he signed with Montana.

== Career statistics ==
=== Club ===
As of 18 May 2025

Club	Season	Division	League		Cup		Europe		Other		Total	
Club	Season	Division	Apps	Goals	Apps	Goals	Apps	Goals	Apps	Goals	Apps	Goals
Chavdar Etropole (loan)	2011–12	B Group	1	0	0	0	–		–		1	0
Litex Lovech	2013–14	A Group	0	0	0	0	–		–		0	0
Spartak Pleven (loan)	2015–16	B Group	9	0	2	0	–		–		11	0
Litex Lovech II	2015–16	B Group	0	0	–		–		–		0	0
Spartak Pleven	2016–17	Second League	7	0	0	0	–		–		7	0
Botev Galabovo	2017–18	Second League	9	0	1	0	–		–		10	0
Montana	2017–18	Second League	2	0	0	0	–		–		2	0
Montana	2018–19	Second League	3	0	1	0	–		0	0	4	0
Montana	2019–20	Second League	3	0	1	0	–		1	0	5	0
Montana	2020–21	First League	8	0	1	0	–		–		9	0
Montana	Total		16	0	3	0	0	0	1	0	20	0
Neftochimic	2020–21	Second League	8	0	0	0	–		–		8	0
Litex Lovech	2021–22	Second League	13	0	0	0	–		–		13	0
Litex Lovech	2022–23	Second League	34	0	1	0	–		–		35	0
Litex Lovech	Total		47	0	1	0	0	0	0	0	48	0
CSKA Sofia	2023–24	First League	0	0	0	0	0	0	0	0	0	0
CSKA Sofia	2024–25	First League	0	0	0	0	–		–		0	0
CSKA Sofia	2025–26	First League	0	0	0	0	–		–		0	0
CSKA Sofia	Total		0	0	0	0	0	0	0	0	0	0
CSKA Sofia II	2024–25	Second League	24	0	–		–		–		24	0
CSKA Sofia II	2025–26	Second League	7	0	–		–		–		7	0
CSKA Sofia II	Total		31	0	0	0	0	0	0	0	31	0
Botev Vratsa	2025–26	First League	15	0	0	0	–		–		15	0
Botev Vratsa	2026-27	First League	7	0					1	0	8	0
Career Total			139	0	7	0	0	0	1	0	159	0
