= Olaus Skarsem =

Norwegian footballer (born 1998)

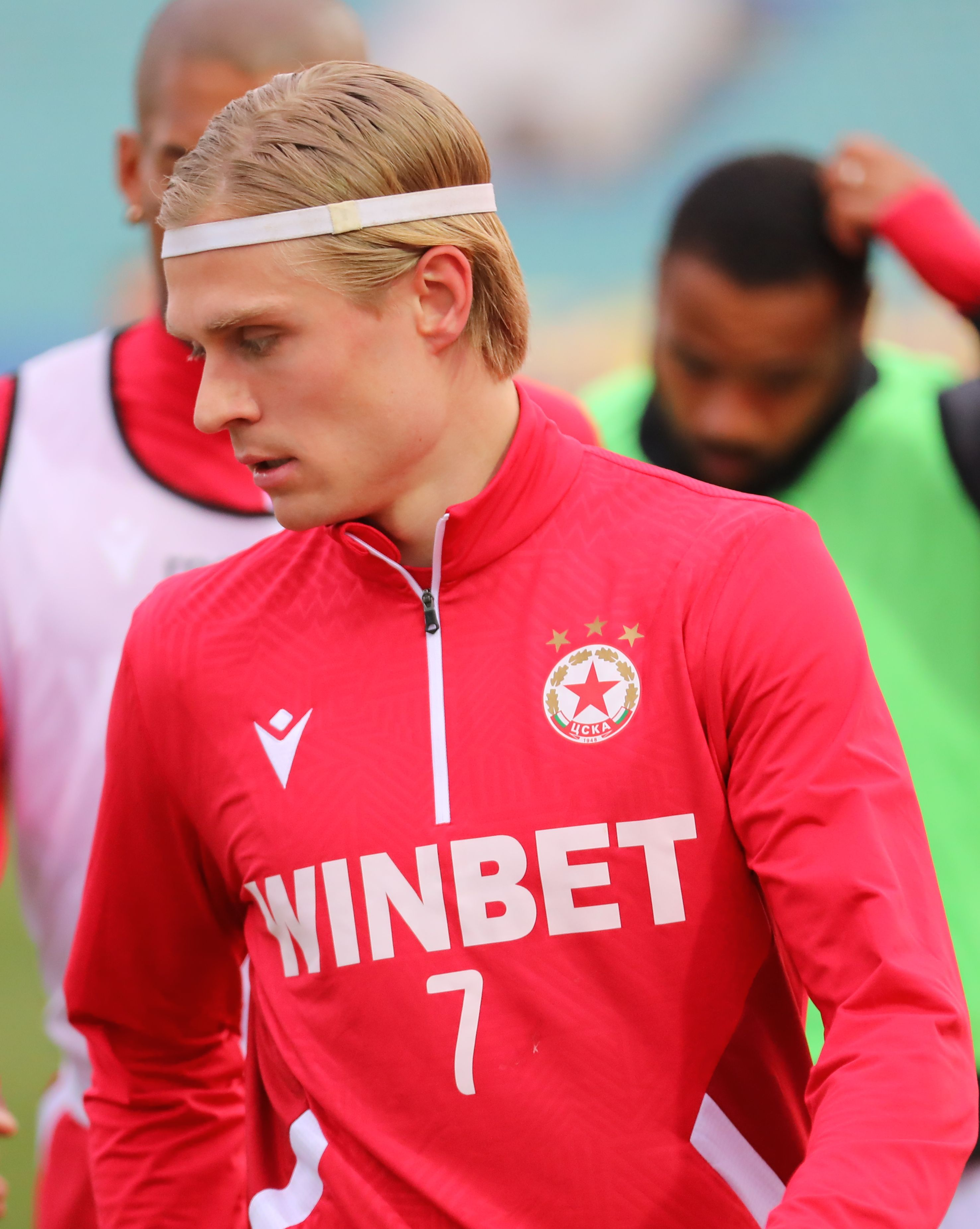

Personal information
- Full name: Olaus Jair Skarsem
- Date of birth: 2 July 1998 (age 28)
- Place of birth: Trondheim, Norway
- Height: 1.78 m (5 ft 10 in)
- Position: Midfielder

Team information
- Current team: Sarpsborg 08
- Number: 77

Youth career
- Gimse
- Melhus
- Astor
- 2013–2017: Rosenborg

Senior career*
Years	Team	Apps	(Gls)
2017–2020	Rosenborg	0	(0)
2019	→ Ranheim (loan)	21	(1)
2020–2021	Kristiansund	39	(3)
2021–2024	Rosenborg	60	(3)
2024–2026	CSKA Sofia	52	(5)
2026–	Sarpsborg 08	12	(2)

International career^{‡}
2016	Norway U18	7	(0)
2019	Norway U21	1	(1)
- * Club domestic league appearances and goals as of 12:02, 1 November 2026 (UTC) ‡ National team caps and goals as of 5 April 2019

Olaus Jair Skarsem (born 2 July 1998) is a Norwegian professional footballer who plays as a midfielder for Sarpsborg 08.

== Career ==
He made his debut for Rosenborg 13 April 2016 against Åfjord FK in the first round of the Cup, coming on and scoring in a 3-0 away win.

After struggelig with injuries in the 2017 and 2018 season, also playing time when fit, he was sent out on loan to Ranheim for the 2019 season. He made his Eliteserien debut for Ranheim coming on against Tromsø in a 1-2 loss at home in the first round of the 2019 season. He scored his first league goal against Sarpsborg 08 on May 19 in a 3-1 away win. On 14 January 2020 Skarsem signed for Kristiansund. In July 2021 Skarsem returned to Rosenborg.

On 10 January 2024 Skarsem signed for Bulgarian club CSKA Sofia.

On 16 July 2026, Skarsem moved back to Norway to play for Sarpsborg 08 on a two-and-a-half year contract.

== Career statistics ==
=== Club ===
As of match played 25 October 2026

Appearances and goals by club, season and competition
Club	Season	League			National Cup		Europe		Other^{2}		Total	
Club	Season	Division	Apps	Goals	Apps	Goals	Apps	Goals	Apps	Goals	Apps	Goals
Rosenborg	2016	Tippeligaen	0	0	1	1	—		—		1	1
Rosenborg	2017	Eliteserien	0	0	0	0	—		—		0	0
Rosenborg	2018	Eliteserien	0	0	1	0	1	0	1	0	3	0
Rosenborg	Total		0	0	2	1	1	0	1	0	4	1
Ranheim (loan)	2019	OBOS-ligaen	21	1	3	2	—		—		24	3
Kristiansund	2020	Eliteserien	26	3	0	0	—		—		26	3
Kristiansund	2021	Eliteserien	13	0	0	0	—		—		13	0
Kristiansund	Total		39	3	0	0	0	0	0	0	39	3
Rosenborg	2021	Eliteserien	16	1	2	2	—		—		18	3
Rosenborg	2022	Eliteserien	25	0	2	0	—		—		27	0
Rosenborg	2023	Eliteserien	19	2	1	0	1	0	—		21	2
Rosenborg	Total		60	3	5	2	1	0	0	0	66	5
CSKA Sofia	2023–24	First League	14	3	2	0	—		1	0	17	3
CSKA Sofia	2024–25	First League	24	1	5	0	—		1	0	30	1
CSKA Sofia	2025–26	First League	14	1	1	0	—		0	0	15	1
CSKA Sofia	Total		52	5	8	0	0	0	2	0	62	5
Sarpsborg 08	2026	Eliteserien	12	2	0	0	—		—		12	2
Career total			184	14	18	5	2	0	3	0	207	19

^{1} Includes Norwegian Super Cup matches.

== Honours ==
CSKA Sofia

- Bulgarian Cup: 2025–26
