= Hristiyan Petrov =

Bulgarian footballer

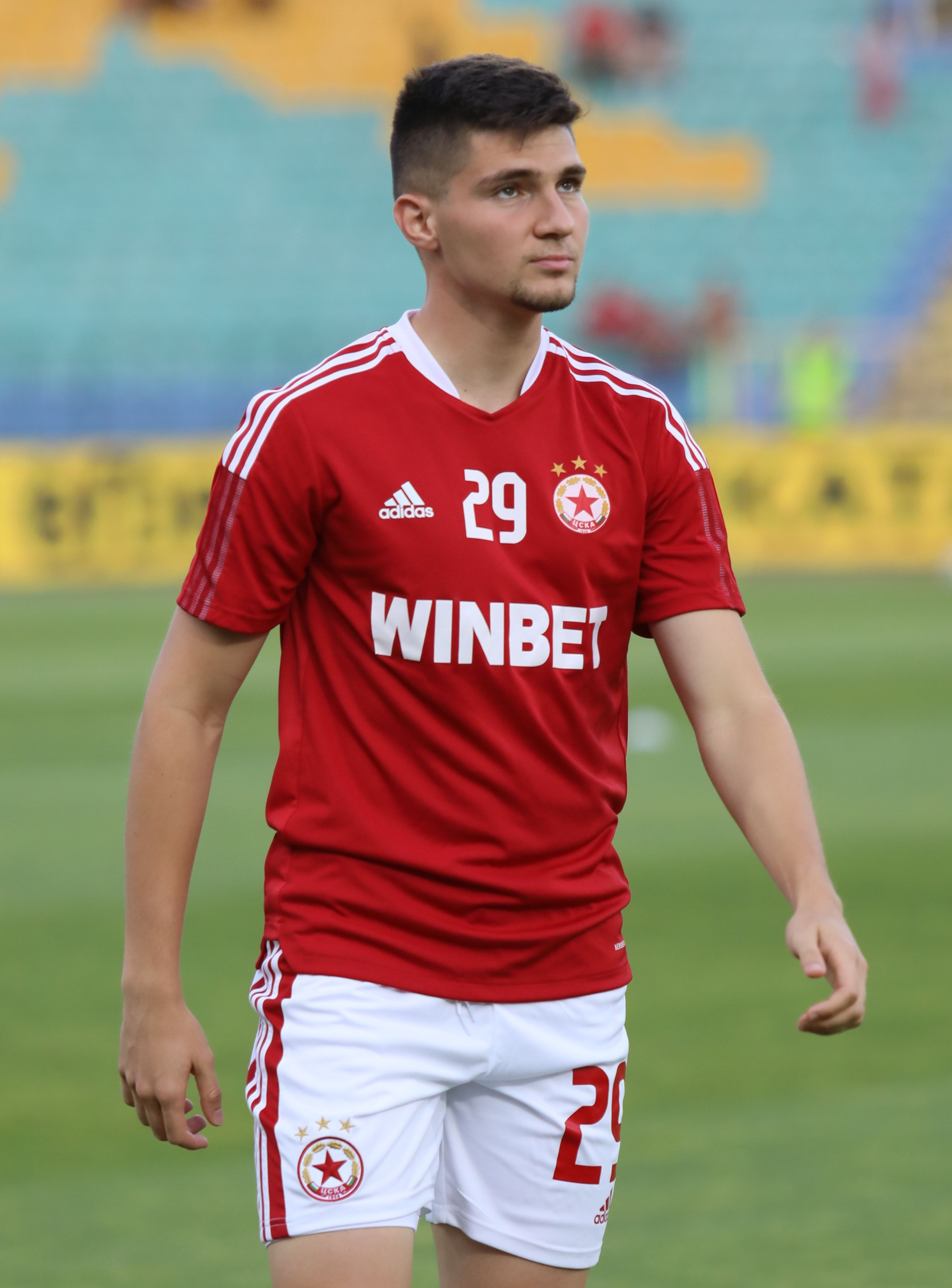
- Petrov with CSKA Sofia in 2021

Personal information
- Full name: Hristiyan Ivaylov Petrov
- Date of birth: 24 June 2002 (age 24)
- Place of birth: Plovdiv, Bulgaria
- Height: 1.84 m (6 ft 0 in)
- Position: Centre-back

Team information
- Current team: Heerenveen
- Number: 28

Youth career
- –2017: Lokomotiv Plovdiv
- 2017–2020: CSKA Sofia

Senior career*
Years	Team	Apps	(Gls)
2020–2025	CSKA Sofia	70	(2)
2020–2021	→ Litex Lovech (loan)	41	(6)
2025–	Heerenveen	34	(1)

International career^{‡}
2017–2018	Bulgaria U16	4	(0)
2019	Bulgaria U17	5	(1)
2019	Bulgaria U18	3	(0)
2020	Bulgaria U19	15	(1)
2021–2024	Bulgaria U21	16	(0)
2023–	Bulgaria	15	(0)
- * Club domestic league appearances and goals as of 24 October 2026 ‡ National team caps and goals as of 23:06, 13 November 2026 (UTC)

Hristiyan Ivaylov Petrov (Bulgarian: Християн Ивайлов Петров; born 24 June 2002) is a Bulgarian professional footballer who plays as a centre-back for Eredivisie club Heerenveen and the Bulgaria national team.

== Career ==
Petrov joined CSKA Sofia from the Lokomotiv Plovdiv academy in 2017, signing his first professional contract with CSKA on 23 June 2020. He made his professional league debut for the club on 22 August 2021. Petrov debuted in the UEFA Europa Conference League on 4 August 2022 against St Patrick's Athletic. At the end of December 2022, Petrov extended his contract for another three years. His team chose him as the best youngster that same year.

On 5 September 2022, Petrov received his first call-up for the Bulgaria national football team for UEFA Nations League matches against Gibraltar and North Macedonia on 23 September. Whilst playing for the U21 squad in March 2023, he received another call-up to replace the injured Dimo Krastev for the senior squad. On 24 March 2023, Petrov debuted as a starter in a 1–0 home loss against Montenegro before being replaced by Yanis Karabelyov around the one-hour mark.

== Career statistics ==
=== Club ===
As of 24 October 2026

Appearances and goals by club, season and competition
Club	Season	League			Cup		Europe		Other		Total	
Club	Season	Division	Apps	Goals	Apps	Goals	Apps	Goals	Apps	Goals	Apps	Goals
Litex Lovech (loan)	2019–20	Bulgarian Second League	2	0	0	0	–		–		12	0
Litex Lovech (loan)	2020–21	Bulgarian Second League	29	4	0	0	–		–		29	4
Litex Lovech (loan)	2021–22	Bulgarian Second League	10	2	0	0	–		–		10	2
Litex Lovech (loan)	Total		41	6	0	0	0	0	0	0	41	6
CSKA Sofia	2021–22	Bulgarian First League	5	0	0	0	0	0	0	0	5	0
CSKA Sofia	2022–23	Bulgarian First League	26	0	2	0	3	0	0	0	31	0
CSKA Sofia	2023–24	Bulgarian First League	29	2	3	0	0	0	1	0	33	2
CSKA Sofia	2024–25	Bulgarian First League	10	0	1	0	–		–		11	0
CSKA Sofia	Total		70	2	6	0	3	0	1	0	80	2
Heerenveen	2024–25	Eredivisie	6	1	1	0	–		1	0	8	1
Heerenveen	2025–26	Eredivisie	21	0	3	0	–		–		24	0
Heerenveen	2026–27	Eredivisie	7	0	0	0	–		–		7	0
Heerenveen	Total		34	1	4	0	0	0	1	0	39	1
Career total			145	9	10	0	3	0	2	0	160	9

=== International ===
As of match played 13 November 2026

Appearances and goals by national team and year
National team	Year	Apps	Goals
Bulgaria	2023	2	0
Bulgaria	2024	3	0
Bulgaria	2025	4	0
Bulgaria	2026	6	0
Total		15	0

== Honours ==
Individual

- 2023: Best progressing youngster in First Professional Football League
