= Tobias Heintz =

Norwegian footballer (born 1998)

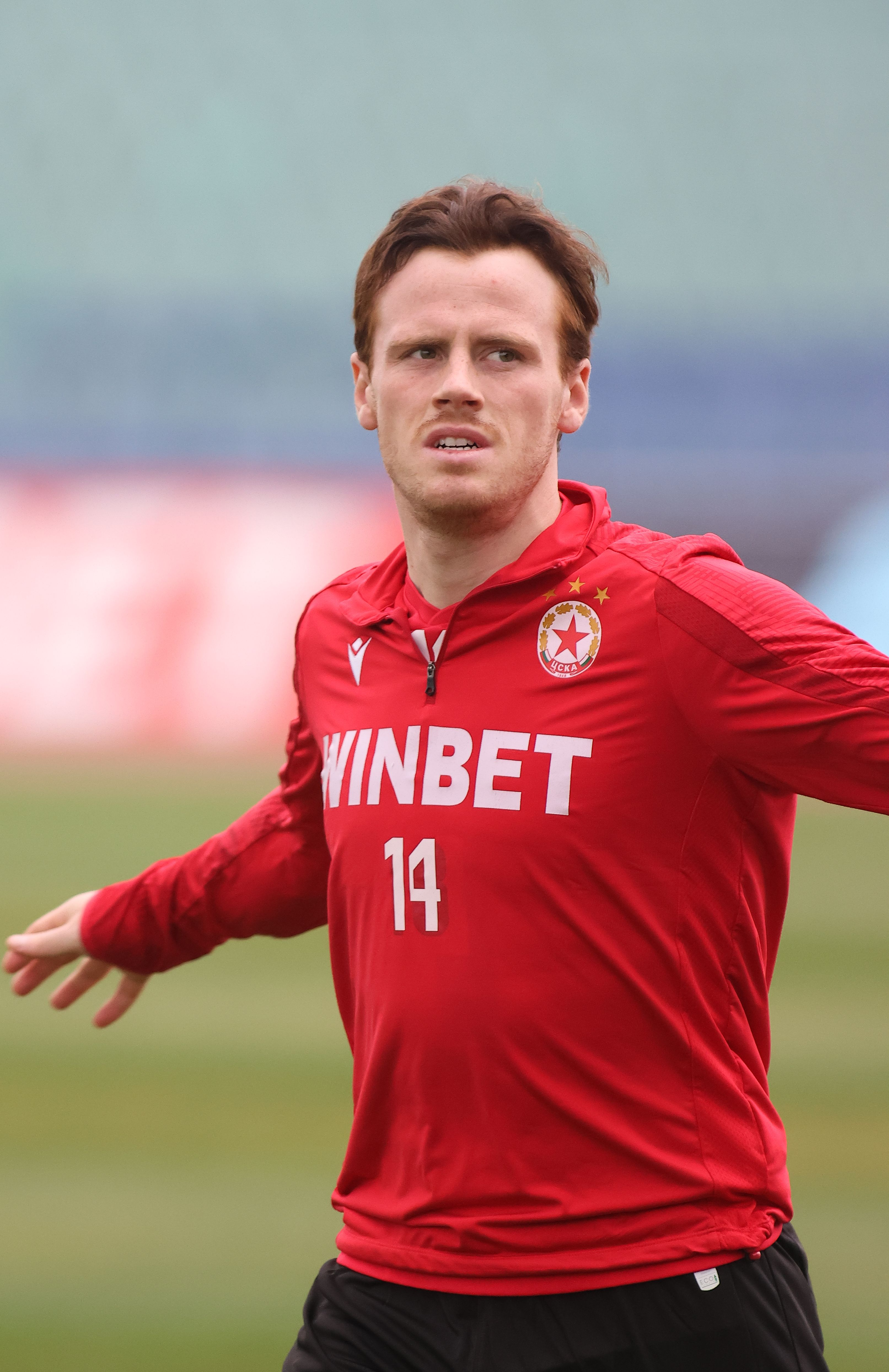
- Heintz with CSKA Sofia in 2023

Personal information
- Full name: Tobias Heintz
- Date of birth: 13 July 1998 (age 28)
- Place of birth: Moss, Norway
- Height: 1.74 m (5 ft 9 in)
- Positions: Winger; attacking midfielder

Team information
- Current team: IFK Göteborg
- Number: 14

Youth career
- –2012: Moss
- 2013–2014: Sprint-Jeløy
- 2014–2015: Sarpsborg 08

Senior career*
Years	Team	Apps	(Gls)
2013–2014	Sprint-Jeløy 2	24	(22)
2013–2014	Sprint-Jeløy	7	(1)
2014–2018	Sarpsborg 08 2	62	(37)
2015–2018	Sarpsborg 08	48	(6)
2019–2021	Kasımpaşa	16	(0)
2020	→ Sarpsborg 08 (loan)	14	(2)
2021–2022	BK Häcken	18	(2)
2022	→ Sarpsborg 08 (loan)	29	(15)
2023–2025	CSKA Sofia	61	(9)
2025–	IFK Göteborg	50	(14)

International career
2015	Norway U17	4	(1)
2016	Norway U18	7	(0)
2017	Norway U19	3	(0)
2018–2019	Norway U21	9	(2)
- * Club domestic league appearances and goals as of 19:05, 19 September 2026 (UTC)

Tobias Heintz (born 13 July 1998) is a Norwegian professional footballer who plays as a winger or attacking midfielder for IFK Göteborg.

Primarily known for his spells at Sarpsborg 08, Heintz has played in Norway, Turkey, Sweden and Bulgaria.

== Club career ==
Heintz started his career in his local club Moss FK, before joining crosstown rivals SK Sprint-Jeløy. He made his senior debut for Sprint-Jeløy in 2014 before joining Sarpsborg 08.

Heintz scored two goals against Lillestrøm SK on 10 July 2017. On 20 October 2017, Heintz signed a new four-year long-term contract with Sarpsborg 08.

On 4 January 2019, Heintz was announced at Kasımpaşa, signing a three-and-a-half-year contract with the club. However, he struggled for playing time, making just 7 appearances, though he quoted that he had "never regretted it".

On 26 August 2020, Heintz returned to Sarpsborg 08 on a loan deal until the end of the season.

On 8 February 2021, Heintz was announced at BK Häcken on a four-year contract.

On 4 March 2022, Heintz was announced on a season-long loan to Sarpsborg 08. Heintz scored a hattrick against FK Jerv in September 2022. He won the Player of the Month award for his performances in September 2022. During the 2022 season, he broke the record of highest-scoring Sarpsborg 08 player in a single elite league season, with 13 goals scored.

On 5 January 2023, Heintz was announced at CSKA Sofia on a permanent transfer.

On 13 January 2025, Heintz was announced at IFK Göteborg, signing a three-year contract with the club.

== International career ==
Whilst playing for Norway U21s, Heintz scored against Turkey U21 on 21 November 2018.

== Career statistics ==
=== Club ===
As of match played 2 November 2025

Appearances and goals by club, season and competition
Club	Season	League			National Cup		Continental		Other		Total	
Club	Season	Division	Apps	Goals	Apps	Goals	Apps	Goals	Apps	Goals	Apps	Goals
Sprint-Jeløy	2013	3. divisjon	1	0	0	0	–		—		1	0
Sprint-Jeløy	2014	3. divisjon	6	0	0	0	–		—		6	0
Sprint-Jeløy	Total		7	0	0	0	0	0	0	0	7	0
Sarpsborg 08	2016	Tippeligaen	3	1	2	1	–		—		5	2
Sarpsborg 08	2017	Eliteserien	22	3	7	2	–		—		29	5
Sarpsborg 08	2018	Eliteserien	22	2	3	3	13	3	—		38	8
Sarpsborg 08	Total		47	6	12	6	13	3	0	0	72	15
Kasımpaşa	2018–19	Süper Lig	8	0	2	0	–		—		10	0
Kasımpaşa	2019–20	Süper Lig	7	0	3	1	–		—		10	1
Kasımpaşa	Total		15	0	5	1	0	0	0	0	20	1
Sarpsborg 08 (loan)	2020	Eliteserien	15	2	0	0	–		—		15	2
BK Häcken	2021	Allsvenskan	16	2	6	1	–		—		22	3
Sarpsborg 08 (loan)	2022	Eliteserien	29	15	2	1	–		—		31	16
CSKA Sofia	2022–23	First League	16	3	1	0	–		—		17	3
CSKA Sofia	2023–24	First League	32	6	5	0	2	0	1	0	40	6
CSKA Sofia	2024–25	First League	13	0	1	1	–		—		14	1
CSKA Sofia	Total		61	9	7	1	2	0	1	0	71	10
IFK Göteborg	2025	Allsvenskan	28	8	4	3	–		—		32	11
Career total			217	41	36	13	15	3	1	0	270	57
