= 2022–23 PFC CSKA Sofia season =

CSKA Sofia
2022–23 season
- Controlling owner: Grisha Ganchev
- Manager: Saša Ilić
- Parva Liga: 2nd
- Bulgarian Cup: Quarter-finals
- UEFA Europa Conference League: Play-off round
- Top goalscorer: League: Duckens Nazon (18); All: Duckens Nazon (20)
| Home colours | Away colours | Third colours |
- All statistics correct as of 7 June 2023.

The 2022–23 season was CSKA Sofia's 74th season in the Parva Liga (the top flight of Bulgarian football) and their seventh consecutive participation after their administrative relegation to the third division due to mounting financial troubles. In addition to the domestic league, CSKA Sofia participated in this season's edition of the Bulgarian Cup and UEFA Europa Conference League.

== Players ==
=== Squad information ===
| N | Pos. | Nat. | Name | Age | Since | App | Goals | Ends | Transfer fee | Notes |
|---|---|---|---|---|---|---|---|---|---|---|
| 1 | GK | (Brazil) | Gustavo Busatto | 31 | 2019 | 147 | 0 | 2023 | Free | |
| 2 | DF | (Netherlands) | Jurgen Mattheij | 29 | 2020 | 111 | 10 | 2024 | Free | |
| 3 | DF | (Brazil) | Geferson | 28 | 2017 (Winter) | 159 | 3 | 2024 | Undisclosed | |
| 4 | DF | (Netherlands) | Menno Koch | 27 | 2020 (Winter) | 60 | 6 | 2024 | €500,000 | |
| 5 | DF | (Netherlands) | Bradley de Nooijer | 24 | 2022 | 27 | 2 | 2025 | €200,000 | |
| 6 | DF | (Bulgaria) | Hristiyan Petrov | 19 | 2020 | 36 | 0 | 2024 | Youth system | |
| 7 | MF | (Norway) | Jonathan Lindseth | 26 | 2022 | 36 | 2 | 2026 | €500,000 | |
| 8 | MF | (Bulgaria) | Stanislav Shopov | 20 | 2022 | 37 | 1 | 2025 | Free | |
| 9 | FW | (Haiti) | Duckens Nazon | 28 | 2022 | 40 | 20 | 2025 | €200,000 | |
| 10 | MF | (Bulgaria) | Georgi Yomov | 24 | 2020 | 94 | 17 | 2024 | €300,000 | |
| 11 | MF | (Serbia) | Lazar Tufegdžić | 25 | 2022 | 33 | 4 | 2025 | €300,000 | |
| 12 | GK | (Bulgaria) | Iliya Shalamanov-Trenkov | 19 | 2020 | 0 | 0 | 2024 | Youth system | |
| 13 | DF | (Bulgaria) | Galin Minkov | 24 | 2018 | 5 | 0 | 2024 | Youth system | |
| 14 | FW | (Norway) | Tobias Heintz | 23 | 2022 (Winter) | 17 | 3 | 2026 | €600,000 | |
| 15 | DF | (France) | Thibaut Vion | 28 | 2020 | 96 | 2 | 2023 | Free | |
| 16 | DF | (Bulgaria) | Asen Donchev | 20 | 2020 | 23 | 1 | 2024 | Youth system | |
| 17 | FW | (Ghana) | Bismark Charles | 21 | 2020 (Winter) | 45 | 5 | 2024 | Free | |
| 18 | FW | (Bulgaria) | Ilian Antonov | 17 | 2022 | 1 | 0 | 2024 | Youth system | Antonov played previously with number 14 this season. |
| 19 | DF | (Bulgaria) | Ivan Turitsov | 22 | 2018 | 144 | 7 | 2023 | Youth system | |
| 20 | FW | (Bulgaria) | Radoslav Zhivkov | 23 | 2017 | 7 | 0 | 2024 | Youth system | Zhivkov played previously with number 23 this season. |
| 21 | MF | (Central African Republic) | Amos Youga | 29 | 2020 | 114 | 4 | 2023 | Free | |
| 22 | MF | (Luxembourg) | Enes Mahmutovic | 25 | 2021 (Winter) | 20 | 1 | 2024 | Free | |
| 23 | MF | (Armenia) | Zhirayr Shaghoyan | 21 | 2022 | 16 | 0 | 2025 | €300,000 | |
| 25 | GK | (Bulgaria) | Dimitar Evtimov | 27 | 2020 | 25 | 0 | 2023 | Free | |
| 26 | MF | (Colombia) | Marcelino Carreazo | 22 | 2022 | 26 | 3 | 2024 | €100,000 | |
| 27 | FW | (Brazil) | Maurício Garcez | 25 | 2021 (Winter) | 52 | 12 | 2023 | Loan | Garcez played with number 10 after the winter break. |
| 28 | FW | (Colombia) | Brayan Moreno | 22 | 2021 (Winter) | 36 | 10 | 2025 | Free | |
| 29 | DF | (Bulgaria) | Rosen Marinov | 17 | 2021 | 1 | 0 | 2026 | Youth system | |
| 30 | FW | (Ivory Coast) | Daouda Bamba | 27 | 2022 | 14 | 1 | 2025 | Free | |

- Last updated: 7 June 2023
- Source: Players transfer and Wikipedia players' articles
- Ordered by squad number.

== Transfers ==
=== In ===
| No. | Pos. | Nat. | Name | Age | EU | Moving from | Type | Transfer window | Ends | Transfer fee | Source |
|---|---|---|---|---|---|---|---|---|---|---|---|
| 8 | MF | (Bulgaria) | Stanislav Shopov | 20 | EU | (Netherlands) Heerenveen | Transfer | Summer | 2025 | Free | cska.bg |
| 24 | FW | (Bulgaria) | Mark-Emilio Papazov | 18 | EU | (Bulgaria) Litex Lovech | Loan return | Summer | | Free | cska.bg |
| 18 | MF | (Bulgaria) | Mitko Mitkov | 21 | EU | (Bulgaria) Litex Lovech | Loan return | Summer | | Free | cska.bg |
| 23 | FW | (Bulgaria) | Radoslav Zhivkov | 23 | EU | (Bulgaria) Litex Lovech | Loan return | Summer | | Free | cska.bg |
| 17 | DF | (Bulgaria) | Aleksandar Buchkov | 18 | EU | (Bulgaria) Litex Lovech | Loan return | Summer | | Free | cska.bg |
| 26 | FW | (Bulgaria) | Martin Smolenski | 19 | EU | (Bulgaria) Minyor Pernik | Loan return | Summer | | Free | cska.bg |
| 31 | GK | (Bulgaria) | Iliya Shalamanov-Trenkov | 19 | EU | (Bulgaria) Litex Lovech | Loan return | Summer | | Free | cska.bg |
| 13 | DF | (Bulgaria) | Galin Minkov | 24 | EU | (Bulgaria) Litex Lovech | Transfer | Summer | | Free | cska.bg |
| 20 | DF | (Bulgaria) | Yoan Baurenski | 20 | EU | (Bulgaria) Botev Vratsa | Loan return | Summer | | Free | cska.bg |
| 11 | MF | (Serbia) | Lazar Tufegdžić | 25 | Non-EU | (Serbia) Spartak Subotica | Transfer | Summer | 2025 | €300,000 | cska.bg |
| 5 | DF | (Netherlands) | Bradley de Nooijer | 24 | EU | (Romania) Farul Constanța | Transfer | Summer | 2025 | €200,000 | cska.bg |
| 9 | FW | (Haiti) | Duckens Nazon | 28 | EU | (France) Quevilly-Rouen | Transfer | Summer | 2025 | €200,000 | cska.bg |
| 7 | MF | (Norway) | Jonathan Lindseth | 26 | EU | (Norway) Sarpsborg 08 | Transfer | Summer | 2026 | €500,000 | cska.bg |
| 30 | FW | (Ivory Coast) | Daouda Bamba | 27 | EU | (Turkey) Altay | Transfer | Summer | 2025 | Free | cska.bg |
| 26 | MF | (Colombia) | Marcelino Carreazo | 22 | Non-EU | (Colombia) Once Caldas | Transfer | Summer | 2024 | €100,000 | cska.bg |
| 23 | MF | (Armenia) | Zhirayr Shaghoyan | 21 | Non-EU | Ararat-Armenia | Loan | Summer | 2025 | €300,000 | cska.bg |
| 18 | MF | (Bulgaria) | Simeon Aleksandrov | 18 | EU | (Bulgaria) Septemvri Sofia | Transfer | Summer | 2025 | €100,000 | cska.bg |
| 20 | FW | (Bulgaria) | Radoslav Zhivkov | 23 | EU | (Bulgaria) Septemvri Sofia | Loan return | Winter | | Free | |
| 14 | FW | (Norway) | Tobias Heintz | 24 | EU | (Sweden) Häcken | Transfer | Winter | 2026 | €600,000 | cska.bg |

=== Out ===
| No. | Pos. | Nat. | Name | Age | EU | Moving to | Type | Transfer window | Transfer fee | Source |
|---|---|---|---|---|---|---|---|---|---|---|
| 8 | MF | (Republic of Ireland) | Graham Carey | 33 | EU | (Scotland) St. Johnstone | Released | Summer | Free | cska.bg |
| 18 | DF | (Republic of the Congo) | Bradley Mazikou | 25 | EU | (Greece) Aris Thessaloniki | Released | Summer | Free | cska.bg |
| 20 | MF | (France) | Junior Nzila | 21 | EU | (Switzerland) Chiasso | Loan return | Summer | Free | cska.bg |
| 23 | FW | (Bulgaria) | Ahmed Ahmedov | 27 | EU | (Bulgaria) Slavia Sofia | Released | Summer | Free | cska.bg |
| 24 | MF | (Croatia) | Karlo Muhar | 28 | EU | (Poland) Lech Poznań | Loan return | Summer | Free | cska.bg |
| 29 | DF | (Finland) | Thomas Lam | 28 | EU | (Australia) Melbourne City | Released | Summer | Free | cska.bg |
| 26 | DF | (Bulgaria) | Rosen Bozhinov | 17 | EU | (Bulgaria) CSKA 1948 II | Released | Summer | Free | cska1948.bg |
| 9 | FW | (Ecuador) | Jordy Caicedo | 24 | Non-EU | (Mexico) Tigres UANL | Transfer | Summer | €2,500,000 | dsport.bg |
| 26 | FW | (Bulgaria) | Martin Smolenski | 19 | EU | (Bulgaria) Pirin | Loan | Summer | Free | cska.bg |
| 30 | MF | (Suriname) | Yanic Wildschut | 30 | EU | (England) Oxford United | Transfer | Summer | Undisclosed | cska.bg |
| 7 | MF | (France) | Yohan Baï | 25 | EU | (France) Bastia | Transfer | Summer | Undisclosed | cska.bg |
| 5 | MF | (Argentina) | Federico Varela | 26 | EU | (United States) Phoenix Rising | Released | Summer | Free | cska.bg |
| 14 | FW | (Bulgaria) | Kaloyan Krastev | 23 | EU | (Bulgaria) Beroe Stara Zagora | Loan | Summer | Free | cska.bg |
| 18 | MF | (Bulgaria) | Mitko Mitkov | 22 | EU | (Bulgaria) Beroe Stara Zagora | Loan | Summer | Free | cska.bg |
| 23 | FW | (Bulgaria) | Radoslav Zhivkov | 23 | EU | (Bulgaria) Septemvri Sofia | Loan | Summer | Free | cska.bg |
| 20 | DF | (Bulgaria) | Yoan Baurenski | 21 | EU | (Bulgaria) Beroe Stara Zagora | Transfer | Winter | Free | cska.bg |
| — | MF | (Bulgaria) | Mitko Mitkov | 22 | EU | (Bulgaria) Septemvri Sofia | Transfer | Winter | Free | cska.bg |
| 18 | MF | (Bulgaria) | Simeon Aleksandrov | 19 | EU | (Bulgaria) Septemvri Sofia | Loan | Winter | Free | cska.bg |
| 24 | DF | (Bulgaria) | Aleksandar Buchkov | 19 | EU | (Bulgaria) Litex Lovech | Loan | Winter | Free | cska.bg |
| 24 | FW | (Bulgaria) | Mark-Emilio Papazov | 19 | EU | (Bulgaria) Hebar | Loan | Winter | Free | dsport.bg |

== Preseason and friendlies ==
Win Draw Loss Fixtures

=== Preseason ===
| 18 June 2022 Friendly | CSKA (Bulgaria) | 1−4 | (Germany) Greuther Fürth | Jenbach, Austria |
| 17:00 UTC+3 | Krastev 75' | Report | Raschl 24'; Abiama 30'; Ache 48', 80' | Stadium: Stadion Jenbach |

| 21 June 2022 Friendly | CSKA (Bulgaria) | 5−3 | (Austria) SV Kematen | Kematen in Tirol, Austria |
| 19:30 UTC+3 | Moreno 41'; Kalinović 45' (o.g.); Tufegdžić 46', 88'; Papazov 85' | Report | Abfalterer 21'; Gatscher 53', 75' | Stadium: Sportplatz Kematen |

| 24 June 2022 Friendly | CSKA (Bulgaria) | 1−2 | (Austria) Red Bull Salzburg | Anif, Austria |
| 19:00 UTC+3 | Shopov 28' | Report | Šimić 37'; Adamu 52' | Stadium: Maximarkt Sportpark |
Note: The game was abandoned in the 70th minute due to an incident with a fan in the stands, who required medical assistance.

| 27 June 2022 Friendly | CSKA (Bulgaria) | 0−4 | (Romania) Sepsi | St. Ulrich am Pillersee, Austria |
| --:-- UTC+3 | | Report | Matei 4', 44'; Niňaj 8'; Golofca 71' | Stadium: Sportplatz St. Ulrich |

| 5 July 2022 Friendly | CSKA | 2−0 | Sportist | Sofia, Bulgaria |
| 20:00 UTC+3 | Papazov 41'; Garcez 55' | Report | | Stadium: Stadion Balgarska Armia |

=== On-season (autumn) ===
| 25 September 2022 Friendly | CSKA | 2−0 | Septemvri | Pancharevo, Bulgaria |
| 16:00 UTC+3 | Nazon 2'; Bamba 72' | Report | | Stadium: Sporten kompleks Pancharevo; Referee: Georgi Dimitrov (Sofia) |

| 20 November 2022 Friendly | CSKA | 6−0 | Minyor | Pancharevo, Bulgaria |
| 14:00 UTC+2 | Carreazo 32'; Moreno 60'; Garcez 64'; Nazon 72'; Vasilev 81' (o.g.); Youga 85' | Report | | Stadium: Sporten kompleks Pancharevo |

=== Mid-season ===
| 18 January 2023 Friendly | CSKA (Bulgaria) | 0−1 | (Japan) Sanfrecce Hiroshima | Belek, Turkey |
| 14:00 UTC+2 | | Report | Matsumoto 87' | Stadium: Kaya Palazzo |

| 20 January 2023 Friendly | CSKA (Bulgaria) | 3−2 | (Poland) Górnik Zabrze | Belek, Turkey |
| 14:00 UTC+2 | Moreno 1'; Turitsov 25' (pen.); Koch 90'; Mattheij (yellow card); Minkov (yellow card); Garcez (yellow card); Geferson (yellow card) | Report | Włodarczyk 29', 81'; Janža (yellow card); Kotzke (yellow card); Jules (yellow card) | Stadium: Kaya Palazzo; Referee: Łukasz Kuźma (Białystok) |

| 24 January 2023 Friendly | CSKA (Bulgaria) | 1−3 | (Austria) LASK | Belek, Turkey |
| 14:00 UTC+2 | Mattheij (yellow card) 62'; Shopov 74' | Report | Žulj 38', (yellow card) 62'; Usor 45'; Goiginger 60' | Stadium: TSS Pitch |

| 27 January 2023 Friendly | CSKA (Bulgaria) | 0−0 | (Kazakhstan) Astana | Belek, Turkey |
| 14:00 UTC+2 | | Report | | Stadium: Fantastic Tour Belek Sport Center |

| 29 January 2023 Friendly | CSKA (Bulgaria) | 0−0 | (North Macedonia) Makedonija Ǵorče Petrov | Belek, Turkey |
| 14:00 UTC+2 | | Report | | Stadium: TSS Pitch |

| 30 January 2023 Friendly | CSKA (Bulgaria) | 3−3 | (Kazakhstan) Shakhter Karagandy | Belek, Turkey |
| 14:00 UTC+2 | Nazon 62' (pen.); Lindseth 71'; Bamba 90' | Report | Galkin 37'; Murtazayev 80'; Youga 85' (o.g.) | Stadium: TSS Pitch |

| 5 February 2023 Friendly | CSKA | 2−1 | Pirin | Sofia, Bulgaria |
| 13:30 UTC+2 | De Nooijer 35'; Nazon 65' | Report | Medved 81' | Stadium: Stadion Balgarska Armia |

=== On-season (spring) ===
| 26 March 2023 Friendly | Sportist | 1−1 | CSKA | Svoge, Bulgaria |
| --:-- UTC+3 | Chilikov 62' | Report | Garcez 75' | Stadium: Stadion Chavdar Tsvetkov |

== Competitions ==
=== Overview ===
| Competition | First match | Last match | Starting round | Final position | Record | | | | | | | |
| Competition | First match | Last match | Starting round | Final position | Pld | W | D | L | GF | GA | GD | Win % |
|---|---|---|---|---|---|---|---|---|---|---|---|---|
| Parva Liga | 10 July 2022 | 7 June 2023 | Matchday 1 | Runners-up | 35 | 26 | 6 | 3 | 65 | 17 | +48 | 74.29 |
| Bulgarian Cup | 26 November 2022 | 4 April 2023 | First round | Quarterfinals | 3 | 1 | 1 | 1 | 4 | 4 | +0 | 33.33 |
| UEFA Europa Conference League | 21 July 2022 | 25 August 2022 | Second qualifying round | Play-off round | 6 | 3 | 1 | 2 | 7 | 3 | +4 | 50.00 |
| Total | | | | | 44 | 30 | 8 | 6 | 76 | 24 | +52 | 68.18 |

Last updated: 7 June 2023
Source: Competitions

=== Parva Liga ===
==== Regular stage ====
===== League table =====
| Pos | Team | Pld | W | D | L | GF | GA | GD | Pts | Qualification |
|---|---|---|---|---|---|---|---|---|---|---|
| 1 | Ludogorets Razgrad | 30 | 23 | 5 | 2 | 72 | 21 | +51 | 74 | Qualification for the Championship group |
| 2 | CSKA Sofia | 30 | 23 | 4 | 3 | 57 | 14 | +43 | 73 | Qualification for the Championship group |
| 3 | CSKA 1948 | 30 | 17 | 8 | 5 | 49 | 22 | +27 | 59 | Qualification for the Championship group |
| 4 | Levski Sofia | 30 | 15 | 9 | 6 | 38 | 14 | +24 | 54 | Qualification for the Championship group |
| 5 | Cherno More | 30 | 15 | 8 | 7 | 36 | 27 | +9 | 53 | Qualification for the Championship group |

Source: soccerway, Bulgarian Football
Rules for classification: 1) Points; 2) Head-to-head points; 3) Head-to-head goal difference; 4) Head-to-head goals scored; 5) Head-to-head away goals scored (only if two teams); 6) Goal difference; 7) Goals scored; 8) Fairplay ranking; 9) Draw.

===== Results summary =====
| Overall | | | | | | | | Home | | | | | | Away | | | | | |
| Pld | W | D | L | GF | GA | GD | Pts | W | D | L | GF | GA | GD | W | D | L | GF | GA | GD |
|---|---|---|---|---|---|---|---|---|---|---|---|---|---|---|---|---|---|---|---|
| 30 | 23 | 4 | 3 | 57 | 14 | +43 | 73 | 11 | 3 | 1 | 30 | 7 | +23 | 12 | 1 | 2 | 27 | 7 | +20 |

Last updated: 8 May 2023.
Source: See results

===== Results by round =====
| Round | 1 | 2 | 3 | 4 | 5 | 6 | 7 | 8 | 9 | 10 | 11 | 12 | 13 | 14 | 15 | 16 | 17 | 18 | 19 | 20 | 21 | 22 | 23 | 24 | 25 | 26 | 27 | 28 | 29 | 30 |
|---|---|---|---|---|---|---|---|---|---|---|---|---|---|---|---|---|---|---|---|---|---|---|---|---|---|---|---|---|---|---|
| Ground | H | A | H | H | A | H | A | H | A | H | A | H | A | H | A | A | H | A | A | H | A | H | A | H | A | H | A | H | A | H |
| Result | W | D | W | W | W | W | W | W | W | W | L | W | L | W | W | W | D | W | W | W | W | D | W | W | W | D | W | L | W | W |
| Position | 1 | 3 | 2 | 2 | 2 | 1 | 1 | 1 | 1 | 1 | 1 | 1 | 1 | 1 | 1 | 1 | 2 | 1 | 1 | 1 | 1 | 1 | 1 | 1 | 1 | 1 | 1 | 2 | 2 | 2 |

Updated to match(es) played on 8 May 2023. Source: See Results
A = Away; H = Home; W = Win; D = Draw; L = Loss

===== Results =====
| 10 July 2022 1 | CSKA | 3−0 | Arda | Sofia |
| 21:00 UTC+3 | Krastev (yellow card) 19'; Garcez 45+1', 52', 56' | Report | Zhelev (yellow card) 19' (yellow-red card) 29'; Yurukov (yellow card) 66'; N'Diaye (yellow card) 81' | Stadium: Stadion Balgarska Armia; Attendance: 2,800; Referee: Radoslav Gidzhenov (Plovdiv); Man of the Match: Maurício Garcez |

| 16 July 2022 2 | Lokomotiv Sofia | 1−1 | CSKA | Sofia |
| 18:30 UTC+3 | França 21' (pen.); Katsarov (yellow card) 48'; Orachev (yellow card) 56'; Miloshev (yellow card) 58'; Duarte (yellow card) 79'; Celso (yellow card) 84'; Damyanov (yellow card) 86' | Report | De Nooijer (yellow card) 20'; Mattheij (yellow card) 20'; Vion (yellow card) 25'; Ilić (yellow card) 67'; Geferson (yellow card) 84'; Moreno 90' | Stadium: Stadion Lokomotiv; Attendance: 2,500; Referee: Volen Chinkov (Sofia); Man of the Match: Stanislav Shopov |

| 25 July 2022 3 | CSKA | 1−0 | Cherno More | Sofia |
| 20:30 UTC+3 | Krastev (yellow card) 53'; Vion (yellow card) 55'; Turitsov (yellow card) 64'; Donchev 77'; Ilić (yellow card) 90+3' | Report | Panov (yellow card) 3'; Clemente (yellow card) 40' | Stadium: Stadion Balgarska Armia; Attendance: 2,000; Referee: Georgi Ginchev (Veliko Tarnovo); Man of the Match: Asen Donchev |

| 31 July 2022 4 | CSKA | 5−1 | Beroe | Sofia |
| 21:00 UTC+3 | Garcez 5', 90+6', (yellow card) 90+1'; Geferson (yellow card) 13'; Nazon 18'; Moreno 75'; Turitsov 90+4' (pen.) | Report | Nikolov (yellow card) 26'; Toungara 81' (pen.), (yellow card) 83'; Ruca (yellow card) 86' | Stadium: Stadion Balgarska Armia; Referee: Valentin Zhelezov (Burgas); Man of the Match: Duckens Nazon |

| 14 August 2022 6 | CSKA | 1−0 | Septemvri | Sofia |
| 20:00 UTC+3 | Minkov (yellow card) 30'; Geferson (yellow card) 35'; Moreno 59'; Ilić (yellow card) 80'; Vion (yellow card) 87'; Donchev (yellow card) 90+2' | Report | Kolev (yellow card) 42'; Delimeđac (yellow card) 87'; Achkov (yellow card) 87' | Stadium: Stadion Balgarska Armia; Attendance: 1,100; Referee: Dragomir Draganov (Varna); Man of the Match: Brayan Moreno |

| 29 August 2022 8 | CSKA | 2−1 | CSKA 1948 | Sofia |
| 20:30 UTC+3 | De Nooijer (yellow card) 14', (goal) 87'; Kaplanović (yellow card) 75'; Turitsov 78' (pen.); Youga (yellow card) 90+4'; Geferson (yellow card) 90+6' | Report | Bastunov 51'; Héliton (yellow card) 77' (yellow-red card) 90' | Stadium: Stadion Balgarska Armia; Attendance: 4,000; Referee: Radoslav Gidzhenov (Plovdiv); Man of the Match: Bradley de Nooijer |

| 3 September 2022 9 | Spartak | 0−1 | CSKA | Varna |
| 17:15 UTC+3 | Mendy (yellow card) 39'; Vasev (yellow card) 63'; Klimentov (yellow card) 63'; Mitev (yellow card) 86' | Report | Bamba 40'; Busatto (yellow card) 56'; Mattheij (yellow card) 63'; Nazon (yellow card) 90+3' | Stadium: Stadion Spartak; Referee: Ante Čulina (Croatia); Man of the Match: Daouda Bamba |

| 11 September 2022 10 | CSKA | 2−0 | Slavia | Sofia |
| 17:45 UTC+3 | Tufegdžić (yellow card) 45'; Garcez 55'; Koch 58'; Youga (yellow card) 86' | Report | | Stadium: Stadion Balgarska Armia; Referee: Volen Chinkov (Sofia); Man of the Match: Maurício Garcez |

| 18 September 2022 11 | Levski | 2−0 | CSKA | Sofia |
| 16:45 UTC+3 | Milanov (yellow card) 52'; Kraev (yellow card) 56'; Stefanov 77'; Welton 81' | Report | Youga (yellow card) 52'; De Nooijer (yellow card) 74'; Turitsov (red card) 90'; Koch (yellow card) 90+6' | Stadium: Natsionalen stadion Vasil Levski; Referee: Dragomir Draganov (Varna); Man of the Match: Welton Felipe |

| 3 October 2022 12 | CSKA | 2−1 | Pirin | Sofia |
| 17:30 UTC+3 | Nazon 19' (pen.); Moreno 23'; Youga (yellow card) 65'; Shopov (yellow card) 88'; Bismark (yellow card) 90+2' | Report | Georgiev (yellow card) 17'; Tasev 26'; Bengyuzov (yellow card) 33'; Velyev (yellow card) 43'; Tsonev (yellow card) 45+1'; Hubchev (yellow card) 51' | Stadium: Stadion Balgarska Armia; Attendance: 700; Referee: Ivo Andreev (Sofia); Man of the Match: Brayan Moreno |

| 10 October 2022 13 | Ludogorets | 2−1 | CSKA | Razgrad |
| 19:00 UTC+3 | Tissera 9'; Gropper (yellow card) 33'; Verdon (yellow card) 65'; Tekpetey (yellow card) 68'; Piotrowski 79' | Report | Moreno (yellow card) 37'; Youga 56'; Mattheij (yellow card) 58'; Geferson (yellow card) 68' | Stadium: Huvepharma Arena; Attendance: 5,000; Referee: Georgi Kabakov (Plovdiv); Man of the Match: Sergio Padt |

| 15 October 2022 14 | CSKA | 4−0 | Hebar | Sofia |
| 19:15 UTC+3 | Nazon 32', 56', (yellow card) 50'; Ilić (yellow card) 45+1'; Moreno 61', 71', (yellow card) 83' | Report | Debarliev (yellow card) 72'; Serrano (red card) 79'; Mazáň (yellow card) 84' | Stadium: Stadion Balgarska Armia; Referee: Ivaylo Nenkov (Sofia); Man of the Match: Duckens Nazon |

| 19 October 2022 5 | Botev Plovdiv | 0−1 | CSKA | Plovdiv |
| 18:45 UTC+3 | Eto'o (yellow card) 37'; Tonev (yellow card) 54'; Kopić (yellow card) 55'; Rabeï (yellow card) 83'; Punčec (yellow card) 83'; Baroan (yellow card) 90+2' | Report | Nazon (yellow card) 53', (goal) 72' (pen.); Youga (yellow card) 54'; Lindseth (yellow card) 65'; De Nooijer (yellow card) 90+1'; Vion (yellow card) 90+6' | Stadium: Futbolen kompleks Botev 1912; Attendance: 3,200; Referee: Ivaylo Stoyanov (Petrich); Man of the Match: Duckens Nazon |
Note: The game has been originally scheduled for 7 August, 21:00 EEST, but has been rescheduled due to CSKA's ongoing participation in the 2022–23 UEFA Europa Conference League. On 16 September the technical committee of the BFU rescheduled the game for 19 October 2022.

| 23 October 2022 15 | Botev Vratsa | 0−4 | CSKA | Vratsa |
| 16:45 UTC+3 | Biatoumoussoka (yellow card) 38' | Report | Carreazo 6'; Turitsov (yellow card) 16'; Tufegdžić 35'; Nazon (yellow card) 45'; Shopov 80'; Moreno 90+1' | Stadium: Stadion Hristo Botev; Attendance: 4,500; Referee: Vasimir El-Hatib (Sofia); Man of the Match: Marcelino Carreazo |

| 28 October 2022 16 | Arda | 1−3 | CSKA | Kardzhali |
| 18:30 UTC+3 | Kovachev (yellow card) 38', (goal) 55'; Yurukov (yellow card) 90+2' | Report | Garcez (yellow card) 20'; Lindseth 32'; Nazon 64'; Mattheij (yellow card) 74'; Geferson (yellow card) 79'; Carreazo 90' | Stadium: Arena Arda; Attendance: 3,500; Referee: Georgi Davidov (Veliko Tarnovo); Man of the Match: Jonathan Lindseth |

| 1 November 2022 7 | Lokomotiv Plovdiv | 0−1 | CSKA | Plovdiv |
| 17:15 UTC+2 | Karagaren (yellow card) 8' | Report | Tufegdžić 27'; Nazon (yellow card) 35'; Carreazo (yellow card) 58'; Turitsov (yellow card) 61'; Busatto (yellow card) 90+3'; Moreno (yellow card) 90+4'; De Nooijer (yellow card) 90+4' | Stadium: Stadion Lokomotiv; Referee: Valentin Zhelezov (Burgas); Man of the Match: Amos Youga |
Note: The game has been originally scheduled for the period between 19 and 22 August 2022, but has been rescheduled due to CSKA's ongoing participation in the 2022–23 UEFA Europa Conference League. On 16 September the technical committee of the BFU rescheduled the game for 1 November 2022.

| 6 November 2022 17 | CSKA | 0−0 | Lokomotiv Sofia | Sofia |
| 17:15 UTC+2 | Mahmutovic (yellow card) 67' | Report | Celso (yellow card) 90+4' | Stadium: Stadion Balgarska Armia; Attendance: 3,500; Referee: Dragomir Draganov (Varna); Man of the Match: Aleksandar Lyubenov |

| 12 November 2022 18 | Cherno More | 0−2 | CSKA | Varna |
| 15:00 UTC+2 | Panov (yellow card) 55'; Clemente (yellow card) 90+5' | Report | Petrov (yellow card) 38'; Vion (yellow card) 50'; Geferson 64'; Carreazo 75'; Koch (yellow card) 85'; De Nooijer (yellow card) 90+3' (yellow-red card) 90+5' | Stadium: Stadion Ticha; Attendance: 5,000; Referee: Georgi Ginchev (Veliko Tarnovo); Man of the Match: Geferson |

| 12 February 2023 19 | Beroe | 1−4 | CSKA | Stara Zagora |
| 14:15 UTC+2 | Mechev 54'; Karadzhov (yellow card) 57'; Henrique (yellow card) 68' | Report | Mattheij (yellow card) 23'; Youga (yellow card) 50'; Petrov (yellow card) 57' (yellow-red card) 90+4'; De Nooijer 71'; Moreno 77'; Lindseth (yellow card) 80'; Nazon 85'; Turitsov 90+1' (pen.) | Stadium: Stadion Beroe; Attendance: 6,500; Referee: Georgi Davidov (Veliko Tarnovo); Man of the Match: Bradley de Nooijer |

| 18 February 2023 20 | CSKA | 3−1 | Botev Plovdiv | Sofia |
| 17:30 UTC+2 | Nazon 10', 25'; Garcez 47'; Mahmutovic (yellow card) 65' | Report | Minkov 45+2'; Konate (yellow card) 54'; Nnadi (yellow card) 62'; Eto'o (yellow card) 90' (yellow-red card) 90+11'; Herman (yellow card) 90+9' | Stadium: Stadion Balgarska Armia; Attendance: 11,000; Referee: Stanimir Trenchev (Sofia); Man of the Match: Duckens Nazon |

| 26 February 2023 21 | Septemvri | 0−1 | CSKA | Sofia |
| 17:15 UTC+2 | Gavrilov (yellow card) 5'; Georgiev (yellow card) 42'; Achkov (yellow card) 43'; Atanasov (yellow card) 90+3' | Report | Ilić (yellow card) 41'; Nazon 42'; Shopov (yellow card) 45+2'; Petrov (yellow card) 67'; Geferson (yellow card) 74'; Carreazo (yellow card) 88'; Busatto (yellow card) 90+2' | Stadium: Natsionalen stadion Vasil Levski (Note: Septemvri plays their league home games at Natsionalen stadion Vasil Levski, Sofia, instead of their regular stadium Stadion Septemvri, Sofia, which does not meet the BFU requirements.); Attendance: 1,500; Referee: Krasen Georgiev (Varna); Man of the Match: Duckens Nazon |

| 4 March 2023 22 | CSKA | 1−1 | Lokomotiv Plovdiv | Sofia |
| 17:30 UTC+2 | Nazon 9'; Mattheij (penalty missed) 87' | Report | Sorga 41'; Horkaš (yellow card) 90+6' | Stadium: Stadion Balgarska Armia; Attendance: 10,000; Referee: Dragomir Draganov (Varna); Man of the Match: Dimitar Iliev |

| 12 March 2023 23 | CSKA 1948 | 0−1 | CSKA | Bistritsa |
| 16:45 UTC+2 | Bidounga (yellow card) 19'; Rusev (yellow card) 44' | Report | Geferson (yellow card) 28'; Vion (yellow card) 52'; Heintz 65'; Mahmutovic (yellow card) 73'; Lindseth (yellow card) 82'; Moreno (yellow card) 89' | Stadium: Stadion Bistritsa; Attendance: 300; Referee: Georgi Kabakov (Plovdiv); Man of the Match: Tobias Heintz |

| 18 March 2023 24 | CSKA | 1−0 | Spartak | Sofia |
| 17:00 UTC+2 | Garcez 14'; Mattheij (yellow card) 22'; Shopov (yellow card) 66' | Report | Mitev (yellow card) 45+1'; Vasev (yellow card) 89' | Stadium: Stadion Balgarska Armia; Attendance: 8,500; Referee: Kristiyan Kolev (Plovdiv); Man of the Match: Maurício Garcez |

| 9 April 2023 25 | Slavia | 0−2 | CSKA | Sofia |
| 20:15 UTC+2 | Nikolov (yellow card) 86' | Report | Geferson (yellow card) 27'; Koch (yellow card) 59', (goal) 62'; Nazon 67', (yellow card) 78'; Mahmutovic (yellow card) 86' | Stadium: Stadion Aleksandar Shalamanov; Referee: Stanislav Todorov (Shumen); Man of the Match: Tobias Heintz |

| 17 April 2023 26 | CSKA | 0−0 | Levski | Sofia |
| 17:30 UTC+3 | Heintz (yellow card) 36'; Vion (yellow card) 40'; Youga (yellow card) 45'; Mattheij (yellow card) 80'; De Nooijer (yellow card) 88'; Busatto (yellow card) 90+1' | Report | Kraev (yellow card) 12'; Tsunami (yellow card) 60'; Welton (yellow card) 64'; Popov (penalty missed) 90' | Stadium: Natsionalen stadion Vasil Levski; Referee: Nikola Popov (Sofia); Man of the Match: Gustavo Busatto |

| 23 April 2023 27 | Pirin | 0−1 | CSKA | Blagoevgrad |
| 17:45 UTC+3 | Budinov (yellow card) 45+2'; Makreckis (yellow card) 77' | Report | Moreno 42'; Tufegdžić (yellow card) 49'; Carreazo (yellow card) 77' | Stadium: Stadion Hristo Botev; Referee: Stanimir Trenchev (Sofia); Man of the Match: Tobias Heintz |

| 30 April 2023 28 | CSKA | 0−1 | Ludogorets | Sofia |
| 20:15 UTC+3 | Carreazo (yellow card) 21'; Moreno (yellow card) 32'; Vion (yellow card) 41'; Mahmutović (yellow card) 51'; Turitsov (yellow card) 69'; Lindseth (yellow card) 86' | Report | Nonato (yellow card) 24'; Witry (yellow card) 43'; Gonçalves (yellow card) 45+5'; Despodov (yellow card) 64'; Piotrowski (yellow card) 65'; Thiago 68', (yellow card) 69'; Verdon (yellow card) 80'; Vidal (yellow card) 90+5' | Stadium: Stadion Balgarska Armia; Attendance: 17,600; Referee: Georgi Kabakov (Plovdiv); Man of the Match: Igor Thiago |

| 4 May 2023 29 | Hebar | 0−4 | CSKA | Pazardzhik |
| 18:00 UTC+3 | Valchev (yellow card) 49' | Report | Nazon 5', 28'; Tufegdžić 13'; Mattheij (yellow card) 19'; Turitsov 51' (pen.); Busatto (yellow card) 85' | Stadium: Stadion Georgi Benkovski; Referee: Vladimir Valkov (Plovdiv); Man of the Match: Duckens Nazon |

| 8 May 2023 30 | CSKA | 5−1 | Botev Vratsa | Sofia |
| 20:15 UTC+3 | Turitsov 15' (pen.); Nazon 21', 53', 75'; Koch 52' | Report | Barbosa (yellow card) 42'; Mendoza 59' | Stadium: Stadion Balgarska Armia; Attendance: 0 (Note: CSKA played the game behind closed doors following fan disruption during their home game against Ludogorets on 30 April.); Referee: Valentin Zhelezov (Burgas); Man of the Match: Duckens Nazon |

==== Championship round ====
===== League table =====
| Pos | Team | Pld | W | D | L | GF | GA | GD | Pts | Qualification |
|---|---|---|---|---|---|---|---|---|---|---|
| 1 | Ludogorets Razgrad (C) | 35 | 26 | 7 | 2 | 81 | 27 | +54 | 85 | Qualification for the Champions League first qualifying round |
| 2 | CSKA Sofia | 35 | 26 | 6 | 3 | 65 | 17 | +48 | 84 | Qualification for the Europa Conference League second qualifying round |
| 3 | CSKA 1948 | 35 | 17 | 13 | 5 | 55 | 28 | +27 | 64 | Qualification for the Europa Conference League second qualifying round |
| 4 | Levski Sofia (O) | 35 | 17 | 10 | 8 | 47 | 22 | +25 | 61 | Qualification for the Europa Conference League play-off |
| 5 | Lokomotiv Plovdiv | 35 | 15 | 9 | 11 | 35 | 34 | +1 | 54 (Note: Head-to-head points: Lokomotiv Plovdiv 3, Cherno More 3. Head-to-head goal difference: Lokomotiv Plovdiv +2, Cherno More -2.) | |
| 6 | Cherno More | 35 | 15 | 9 | 11 | 39 | 35 | +4 | 54 | |

Source: Soccerway, Bulgarian Football
Rules for classification: 1) Points; 2) Head-to-head points; 3) Head-to-head goal difference; 4) Head-to-head goals scored; 5) Head-to-head away goals scored (only if two teams); 6) Goal difference; 7) Goals scored; 8) Fairplay ranking; 9) Draw.
(C) Champions; (O) Play-off winners

===== Results summary =====
| Overall | | | | | | | | Home | | | | | | Away | | | | | |
| Pld | W | D | L | GF | GA | GD | Pts | W | D | L | GF | GA | GD | W | D | L | GF | GA | GD |
|---|---|---|---|---|---|---|---|---|---|---|---|---|---|---|---|---|---|---|---|
| 5 | 3 | 2 | 0 | 8 | 3 | +5 | 11 | 2 | 1 | 0 | 4 | 1 | +3 | 1 | 1 | 0 | 4 | 2 | +2 |

Last updated: 7 June 2023.
Source: See results

===== Results by round =====
| Round | 1 | 2 | 3 | 4 | 5 |
|---|---|---|---|---|---|
| Ground | H | A | H | H | A |
| Result | W | D | W | D | W |
| Position | 2 | 2 | 1 | 2 | 2 |

Updated to match(es) played on 7 June 2023. Source: See Results
A = Away; H = Home; W = Win; D = Draw; L = Loss

===== Results =====
| 15 May 2023 31 | CSKA | 2−0 | Cherno More | Pazardzhik (Note: CSKA played the game in Pazardzhik instead on their home ground in Sofia, following disciplinary action against the club following fan disruption during their home game against Ludogorets on 30 April.) |
| 18:00 UTC+3 | Ilić (yellow card) 52'; Petrov (yellow card) 70'; Garcez 80'; Mahmutovic (yellow card) 87'; Lindseth 90+5' | Report | Fernandes (yellow card) 20'; Dimov (yellow card) 57' | Stadium: Stadion Georgi Benkovski; Referee: Stanislav Todorov (Shumen); Man of the Match: Maurício Garcez |

| 20 May 2023 32 | Ludogorets | 2−2 | CSKA | Razgrad |
| 20:15 UTC+3 | Despodov (yellow card) 14', (goal) 18'; Russo (yellow card) 25'; Thiago 48', (yellow card) 85'; Padt (yellow card) 85'; Petev (yellow card) 86'; Tissera (yellow card) 86'; Naressi (yellow card) 90+5' | Report | Carreazo (yellow card) 19'; Heintz 22'; Lindseth (yellow card) 27'; Shopov (yellow card) 29'; Garcez 42'; Evtimov (yellow card) 58'; Mattheij (yellow card) 76'; Nazon (yellow card) 90+5' | Stadium: Huvepharma Arena; Referee: Georgi Kabakov (Plovdiv); Man of the Match: Kiril Despodov |

| 27 May 2023 33 | CSKA | 1−0 | Lokomotiv Plovdiv | Sofia |
| 21:00 UTC+3 | Mattheij 25'; Tufegdžić (yellow card) 61'; Carreazo (yellow card) 90+2' | Report | Silva (yellow card) 16'; Ivanov (yellow card) 21'; Segura (yellow card) 45+1' | Stadium: Stadion Balgarska Armia; Referee: Stanimir Trenchev (Sofia); Man of the Match: Jurgen Mattheij |

| 3 June 2023 34 | CSKA | 1−1 | CSKA 1948 | Sofia |
| 18:00 UTC+3 | Mattheij (yellow card) 14'; Mahmutovic 40'; Koch (yellow card) 63'; Bismark (yellow card) 90'; Busatto (yellow card) 90+6'; Evtimov (yellow card) 90+6'; Turitsov (penalty missed) 90+12'; Shopov (yellow card) 90+13' | Report | Daskalov (yellow card) 24'; Pedrinho 45'; Umarbayev (yellow card) 60'; Kolev (yellow card) 63'; Chochev (yellow card) 72'; Hanyev (yellow card) 85'; Ribarski (yellow card) 90+6'; S. Aleksandrov (yellow card) 90+12'; Granchov (yellow card) 90+13' | Stadium: Stadion Balgarska Armia; Referee: Radoslav Gidzhenov (Plovdiv); Man of the Match: Tobias Heintz |

| 7 June 2023 35 | Levski | 0−2 | CSKA | Sofia |
| 18:45 UTC+3 | Sonko Sundberg (yellow card) 72' (yellow-red card) 80' | Report | Heintz 35'; Geferson (yellow card) 58'; Nazon (yellow card) 59', (goal) 61'; Vion (yellow card) 62'; Turitsov (red card) 79'; Busatto (yellow card) 79'; Youga (yellow card) 90+2' | Stadium: Natsionalen stadion Vasil Levski; Referee: Dragomir Draganov (Varna); Man of the Match: Tobias Heintz |

=== Bulgarian Cup ===
| 26 November 2022 1R | Gigant | 1−1 (a.e.t.) (6−7 p) | CSKA | Saedinenie |
| 12:00 UTC+3 | Skerlev (yellow card) 20'; Alov (yellow card) 26' (yellow-red card) 90+5'; Staykov 41'; Vasilev (yellow card) 46' (yellow-red card) 54'; Musay (yellow card) 59'; Zdravkov (yellow card) 109' | Report | Bismark (yellow card) 22'; Koch (yellow card) 32'; Mattheij (yellow card) 45+3'; Moreno 74'; Carreazo (yellow card) 75'; Minkov (yellow card) 78'; Lindseth (yellow card) 84' | Stadium: Stadion Saedinenie; Referee: Dimitar Dimitrov (Sofia) |
| | Penalties |
| | Skerlev (penalty scored); Shterev (penalty scored); Zdravkov (penalty scored); Hristov (penalty scored); Musay (penalty scored); Nikolov (penalty scored); Gyuzlev (penalty missed) | | (penalty scored) Turitsov; (penalty scored) Lindseth; (penalty scored) Mattheij; (penalty scored) Garcez; (penalty scored) Moreno; (penalty scored) Carreazo; (penalty scored) Koch |

| 1 December 2022 2R | Septemvri | 1−2 | CSKA | Sofia |
| 12:00 UTC+3 | Kabov (yellow card) 39'; Nikolov (yellow card) 51'; Kolev (yellow card) 64'; Chandarov (yellow card) 64'; Georgiev 83' | Report | Geferson (yellow card) 35'; Shopov (yellow card) 45'; Garcez 55'; Nazon 68' (pen.) | Stadium: Stadion Balgarska Armia (Note: Septemvri plays their round two home game at Stadion Balgarska Armia, Sofia, instead of their regular stadium Stadion Septemvri, Sofia, which does not meet the BFU requirements.); Referee: Nikola Popov (Sofia) |

| 4 April 2023 QF | CSKA | 1−2 | Cherno More | Sofia |
| 20:00 UTC+3 | De Nooijer (yellow card) 50'; Nazon (yellow card) 83'; Drobarov 90+3' (o.g.) | Report | Iliev 51' (pen.); Vion 65' (o.g.); Isa (yellow card) 73'; Popov (yellow card) 85'; Dimov (yellow card) 90+6' | Stadium: Stadion Balgarska Armia; Referee: Georgi Dimitrov (Sofia) |

=== UEFA Europa Conference League ===
==== Second qualifying round ====
| 21 July 2022 First leg | Makedonija Ǵorče Petrov (North Macedonia) | 0−0 | (Bulgaria) CSKA | Skopje, North Macedonia |
| 18:00 UTC+3 | Lemos (yellow card) 43' (yellow-red card) 45+2'; Samaké (yellow card) 81' | Report | Turitsov (yellow card) 5'; Mahmutovic (yellow card) 51' | Stadium: Petar Miloševski Training Centre (Note: Makedonija Ǵorče Petrov plays their home match at Petar Miloševski Training Centre, Skopje, instead of their regular stadium Stadion Ǵorče Petrov, Skopje which did not meet UEFA requirements.); Attendance: 402; Referee: Bram Van Driessche (Belgium) |

| 28 July 2022 Second leg | CSKA (Bulgaria) | 4−0 (4−0 agg.) | (North Macedonia) Makedonija Ǵorče Petrov | Sofia, Bulgaria |
| 20:00 UTC+3 | Mattheij 31'; Youga (yellow card) 33'; Baurenski (yellow card) 43'; Yomov 61'; Tufegdžić 78'; Nazon 87' | Report | Emini (yellow card) 44'; Gjurgjevikj (yellow card) 55'; Lazarevikj (yellow card) 75' | Stadium: Stadion Balgarska Armia; Attendance: 4,697; Referee: Marcel Birsan (Romania) |

==== Third qualifying round ====
| 4 August 2022 First leg | CSKA (Bulgaria) | 0−1 | (Republic of Ireland) St Patrick's Athletic | Sofia, Bulgaria |
| 20:00 UTC+3 | Yomov (yellow card) 86' | Report | Grivosti (yellow card) 35'; Cotter (yellow card) 49'; Breslin (yellow card) 59'; Brockbank (yellow card) 61'; Lennon (yellow card) 76'; Atakayi 87' | Stadium: Natsionalen stadion Vasil Levski (Note: CSKA Sofia played their third qualifying round and play-off home matches at Natsionalen stadion Vasil Levski, Sofia, instead of their regular stadium Stadion Balgarska Armia, Sofia, which does not meet UEFA requirements for this stage of the tournament.); Attendance: 7,048; Referee: Manuel Schüttengruber (Austria) |

| 11 August 2022 Second leg | St Patrick's Athletic (Republic of Ireland) | 0−2 (1−2 agg.) | (Bulgaria) CSKA | Dublin, Republic of Ireland |
| 21:45 UTC+3 | Grivosti (yellow card) 56'; Atakayi (yellow card) 75'; Brockbank (yellow card) 80'; Owolabi (yellow card) 89'; O'Reilly (red card) 90+5' | Report | Garcez 12'; Yomov (yellow card) 15'; Mattheij (yellow card) 27'; Youga (yellow card) 59'; Shopov (yellow card) 74'; Turitsov 81' (pen.), (yellow card) 88'; Peković (yellow card) 85'; Baurenski (yellow card) 89'; Koch (yellow card) 90+5'; De Nooijer (red card) 90+5' | Stadium: Tallaght Stadium (Note: St Patrick’s Athletic plviayed their third qualifying round home match at Tallaght Stadium, Dublin, instead of their regular venue, Richmond Park, which did not meet UEFA requirements.); Attendance: 6,760; Referee: Horațiu Feșnic (Romania) |

==== Play-off round ====
| 18 August 2022 First leg | CSKA (Bulgaria) | 1−0 | (Switzerland) Basel | Sofia, Bulgaria |
| 20:00 UTC+3 | López 70' (o.g.); Turitsov (yellow card) 73'; Vion (yellow card) 82' | Report | Nuhu (yellow card) 23'; Amdouni (yellow card) 30'; Diouf (yellow card) 81'; López (yellow card) 85' | Stadium: Natsionalen stadion Vasil Levski (Note: CSKA Sofia played their play-off round home match at Natsionalen stadion Vasil Levski, Sofia, instead of their regular stadium Stadion Balgarska Armia, Sofia, which does not meet UEFA requirements for this stage of the tournament.); Attendance: 15,364; Referee: Duje Strukan (Croatia) |

| 25 August 2022 Second leg | Basel (Switzerland) | 2−0 (2−1 agg.) | (Bulgaria) CSKA | Basel, Switzerland |
| 20:00 UTC+3 | Burger (yellow card) 53'; F. Frei 66'; Lang 84'; Pelmard (yellow card) 90+3' | Report | Mattheij (yellow card) 4'; Petrov (yellow card) 45+2'; Busatto (yellow card) 49'; Vion (yellow card) 53'; Geferson (yellow card) 57' | Stadium: St. Jakob-Park; Attendance: 18,469; Referee: António Nobre (Portugal) |

== Statistics ==
=== Appearances and goals ===
As of 7 June 2023

| No. | Pos | Player | Parva Liga | | Bulgarian Cup | | Conference League | | Total | |
| No. | Pos | Player | Apps | Goals | Apps | Goals | Apps | Goals | Apps | Goals |
|---|---|---|---|---|---|---|---|---|---|---|
| 1 | GK | (Brazil) Gustavo Busatto | 32 | -15 | 0 | 0 | 6 | -3 | 38 | -18 |
| 2 | DF | (Netherlands) Jurgen Mattheij | 25 | 1 | 2 | 0 | 5 | 1 | 32 | 2 |
| 3 | DF | (Brazil) Geferson | 15+7 | 1 | 1 | 0 | 1+5 | 0 | 29 | 1 |
| 4 | DF | (Netherlands) Menno Koch | 9+9 | 3 | 1+1 | 0 | 5 | 0 | 25 | 3 |
| 5 | DF | (Netherlands) Bradley de Nooijer | 19+2 | 2 | 2 | 0 | 3+1 | 0 | 27 | 2 |
| 6 | DF | (Bulgaria) Hristiyan Petrov | 26 | 0 | 2 | 0 | 3 | 0 | 31 | 0 |
| 7 | MF | (Norway) Jonathan Lindseth | 24+5 | 2 | 2+1 | 0 | 3+1 | 0 | 36 | 2 |
| 8 | MF | (Bulgaria) Stanislav Shopov | 18+11 | 1 | 2+1 | 0 | 2+3 | 0 | 37 | 1 |
| 9 | FW | (Haiti) Duckens Nazon | 22+10 | 18 | 1+2 | 1 | 2+3 | 1 | 40 | 20 |
| 10 | FW | (Brazil) Maurício Garcez | 24+7 | 10 | 2+1 | 1 | 6 | 1 | 40 | 12 |
| 11 | MF | (Serbia) Lazar Tufegdžić | 15+11 | 3 | 0+1 | 0 | 3+3 | 1 | 33 | 4 |
| 12 | GK | (Bulgaria) Iliya Shalamanov-Trenkov | 0 | 0 | 0 | 0 | 0 | 0 | 0 | 0 |
| 13 | DF | (Bulgaria) Galin Minkov | 2+1 | 0 | 1 | 0 | 1 | 0 | 5 | 0 |
| 14 | FW | (Norway) Tobias Heintz | 13+3 | 3 | 1 | 0 | 0 | 0 | 17 | 3 |
| 15 | DF | (France) Thibaut Vion | 28+6 | 0 | 2 | 0 | 5+1 | 0 | 42 | 0 |
| 16 | DF | (Bulgaria) Asen Donchev | 2+5 | 1 | 0 | 0 | 1+1 | 0 | 9 | 1 |
| 17 | FW | (Ghana) Bismark Charles | 1+11 | 0 | 1+1 | 0 | 0 | 0 | 14 | 0 |
| 18 | FW | (Bulgaria) Ilian Antonov | 0 | 0 | 0+1 | 0 | 0 | 0 | 1 | 0 |
| 19 | DF | (Bulgaria) Ivan Turitsov | 24+3 | 5 | 1 | 0 | 5 | 1 | 33 | 6 |
| 20 | FW | (Bulgaria) Radoslav Zhivkov | 0+3 | 0 | 0 | 0 | 0+1 | 0 | 4 | 0 |
| 21 | MF | (Central African Republic) Amos Youga | 28+1 | 1 | 2 | 0 | 5+1 | 0 | 37 | 1 |
| 22 | DF | (Luxembourg) Enes Mahmutovic | 15+3 | 1 | 1 | 0 | 1 | 0 | 20 | 1 |
| 23 | MF | (Armenia) Zhirayr Shaghoyan | 8+7 | 0 | 0+1 | 0 | 0 | 0 | 16 | 0 |
| 25 | GK | (Bulgaria) Dimitar Evtimov | 3 | -2 | 3 | -4 | 0 | 0 | 6 | -6 |
| 26 | MF | (Colombia) Marcelino Carreazo | 14+9 | 3 | 2+1 | 0 | 0 | 0 | 26 | 3 |
| 28 | FW | (Colombia) Brayan Moreno | 8+17 | 9 | 2+1 | 1 | 3+2 | 0 | 33 | 10 |
| 29 | DF | (Bulgaria) Rosen Marinov | 0 | 0 | 0+1 | 0 | 0 | 0 | 1 | 0 |
| 30 | FW | (Ivory Coast) Daouda Bamba | 4+7 | 1 | 0 | 0 | 1+2 | 0 | 14 | 1 |
| — | MF | (Bulgaria) Georgi Yomov | 2+1 | 0 | 0 | 0 | 3+1 | 1 | 7 | 1 |
Players who appeared for CSKA Sofia that left during the season:
| 14 | FW | (Bulgaria) Kaloyan Krastev | 3+1 | 0 | 0 | 0 | 1+1 | 0 | 6 | 0 |
| 18 | MF | (Bulgaria) Simeon Aleksandrov | 0+1 | 0 | 0+1 | 0 | 0 | 0 | 2 | 0 |
| 20 | MF | (Bulgaria) Yoan Baurenski | 1+2 | 0 | 1 | 0 | 1 | 0 | 5 | 0 |
| 24 | DF | (Bulgaria) Aleksandar Buchkov | 0 | 0 | 1+1 | 0 | 0 | 0 | 2 | 0 |
| 24 | FW | (Bulgaria) Mark-Emilio Papazov | 0+1 | 0 | 0 | 0 | 0 | 0 | 1 | 0 |

=== Goalscorers ===
| Place | Position | Nation | Number | Name | Parva Liga | Bulgarian Cup | Conference League | Total |
|---|---|---|---|---|---|---|---|---|
| 1 | FW | (Haiti) | 9 | Duckens Nazon | 18 | 1 | 1 | 20 |
| 2 | FW | (Brazil) | 10 | Maurício Garcez | 10 | 1 | 1 | 12 |
| 3 | FW | (Colombia) | 28 | Brayan Moreno | 9 | 1 | 0 | 10 |
| 4 | DF | (Bulgaria) | 19 | Ivan Turitsov | 5 | 0 | 1 | 6 |
| 5 | MF | (Serbia) | 11 | Lazar Tufegdžić | 3 | 0 | 1 | 4 |
| 5 | MF | (Norway) | 14 | Tobias Heintz | 3 | 0 | 1 | 4 |
| 7 | DF | (Netherlands) | 4 | Menno Koch | 3 | 0 | 0 | 3 |
| 7 | MF | (Colombia) | 26 | Marcelino Carreazo | 3 | 0 | 0 | 3 |
| 9 | DF | (Netherlands) | 2 | Jurgen Mattheij | 1 | 0 | 1 | 2 |
| 9 | DF | (Netherlands) | 5 | Bradley de Nooijer | 2 | 0 | 0 | 2 |
| 9 | MF | (Norway) | 7 | Jonathan Lindseth | 2 | 0 | 0 | 2 |
| 12 | DF | (Brazil) | 3 | Geferson | 1 | 0 | 0 | 1 |
| 12 | MF | (Bulgaria) | 8 | Stanislav Shopov | 1 | 0 | 0 | 1 |
| 12 | DF | (Bulgaria) | 16 | Asen Donchev | 1 | 0 | 0 | 1 |
| 12 | MF | (Central African Republic) | 21 | Amos Youga | 1 | 0 | 0 | 1 |
| 12 | DF | (Luxembourg) | 22 | Enes Mahmutovic | 1 | 0 | 0 | 1 |
| 12 | FW | (Ivory Coast) | 30 | Daouda Bamba | 1 | 0 | 0 | 1 |
| 12 | MF | (Bulgaria) | — | Georgi Yomov | 0 | 0 | 1 | 1 |
| | | | | Own goal | 0 | 1 | 1 | 1 |
| TOTALS | | | | | 65 | 4 | 7 | 76 |

As of 7 June 2023

=== Disciplinary record ===
Includes all competitive matches. Players listed below made at least one appearance for CSKA first squad during the season.

| N | P | Nat. | Name | Parva Liga | | | Bulgarian Cup | | | Conference League | | | Total | | | Notes |
| N | P | Nat. | Name | Yellow card | Second yellow card | Red card | Yellow card | Second yellow card | Red card | Yellow card | Second yellow card | Red card | Yellow card | Second yellow card | Red card | Notes |
| 1 | GK | (Brazil) | Gustavo Busatto | 7 | | | | | | 1 | | | 8 | | | |
| 2 | DF | (Netherlands) | Jurgen Mattheij | 10 | | | 1 | | | 2 | | | 13 | | | |
| 3 | DF | (Brazil) | Geferson | 10 | | | 1 | | | 1 | | | 12 | | | |
| 4 | DF | (Netherlands) | Menno Koch | 4 | | | 1 | | | 1 | | | 6 | | | |
| 5 | DF | (Netherlands) | Bradley de Nooijer | 6 | 1 | | 1 | | | | | 1 | 7 | 1 | 1 | |
| 6 | DF | (Bulgaria) | Hristiyan Petrov | 3 | 1 | | | | | 1 | | | 4 | 1 | | |
| 7 | MF | (Norway) | Jonathan Lindseth | 5 | | | 1 | | | | | | 6 | | | |
| 8 | MF | (Bulgaria) | Stanislav Shopov | 5 | | | 1 | | | 1 | | | 7 | | | |
| 9 | FW | (Haiti) | Duckens Nazon | 8 | | | 1 | | | | | | 9 | | | |
| 10 | MF | (Bulgaria) | Georgi Yomov | | | | | | | 2 | | | 2 | | | |
| 11 | MF | (Serbia) | Lazar Tufegdžić | 3 | | | | | | | | | 3 | | | |
| 13 | DF | (Bulgaria) | Galin Minkov | 1 | | | 1 | | | | | | 2 | | | |
| 14 | MF | (Norway) | Tobias Heintz | 1 | | | | | | | | | 1 | | | |
| 14 | FW | (Bulgaria) | Kaloyan Krastev | 2 | | | | | | | | | 2 | | | |
| 15 | DF | (France) | Thibaut Vion | 9 | | | | | | 2 | | | 11 | | | |
| 16 | DF | (Bulgaria) | Asen Donchev | 1 | | | | | | | | | 1 | | | |
| 17 | FW | (Ghana) | Bismark Charles | 2 | | | 1 | | | | | | 3 | | | |
| 19 | DF | (Bulgaria) | Ivan Turitsov | 4 | | 1 | | | | 3 | | | 7 | | 1 | |
| 20 | MF | (Bulgaria) | Yoan Baurenski | | | | | | | 2 | | | 2 | | | |
| 21 | MF | (Central African Republic) | Amos Youga | 8 | | | | | | 2 | | | 10 | | | |
| 22 | DF | (Luxembourg) | Enes Mahmutovic | 6 | | | | | | 1 | | | 7 | | | |
| 25 | GK | (Bulgaria) | Dimitar Evtimov | 2 | | | | | | | | | 2 | | | |
| 26 | MF | (Colombia) | Marcelino Carreazo | 6 | | | 1 | | | | | | 7 | | | |
| 27 | FW | (Brazil) | Maurício Garcez | 2 | | | | | | | | | 2 | | | |
| 28 | FW | (Colombia) | Brayan Moreno | 5 | | | 1 | | | | | | 6 | | | |
| Manager | | (Serbia) | Saša Ilić | 6 | | | | | | | | | 6 | | | |
| Assistant | | (Montenegro) | Milorad Peković | | | | | | | 1 | | | 1 | | | |
| Assistant | | (Serbia) | Veličko Kaplanović | 1 | | | | | | | | | 1 | | | |

Last updated: 7 June 2023
Source: Competitive matches
Only competitive matches
(yellow card) = Number of bookings; (second yellow card) = Number of sending offs after a second yellow card; (red card) = Number of sending offs by a direct red card.

== See also ==
- PFC CSKA Sofia
