= 2022–23 Bulgarian Cup =

Sesame Купа на България

Tournament details
- Country: Bulgaria
- Teams: 47

Final positions
- Champions: Ludogorets Razgrad (3rd title)
- Runners-up: CSKA 1948 Sofia

Tournament statistics
- Matches played: 48
- Goals scored: 140 (2.92 per match)
- Top goal scorer(s): (Ukraine) Yevheniy Serdyuk (Netherlands) Elvis Manu (Bulgaria) Ivaylo Chochev (3 goals each)
- All statistics correct as of 24 May 2023.

The 2022–23 Bulgarian Cup was the 41st official edition of the Bulgarian annual football knockout tournament. It is sponsored by Sesame and known as the Sesame Kupa na Bulgaria for sponsorship purposes. The competition began on 21 September 2022 with the preliminary round and finished with the final on 24 May 2023. Levski Sofia were the defending cup winners, but were eliminated by Ludogorets Razgrad in the round of 16, who went on to win the cup for their 3rd overall. As Ludogorets were already assured of a place in the UEFA Europa Conference League via their league performance, the cup's European berth was passed to the third-placed team in the 2022–23 First League.

== Participating clubs ==
The following 47 teams qualified for the competition:

2022–23 First League; 16 clubs	2022–23 Second League; 15 non-reserve clubs	Winners of regional qualifiers 16 clubs
Arda Kardzhali; Beroe Stara Zagora; Botev Plovdiv; Botev Vratsa; CSKA 1948 Sofia; CSKA Sofia; Cherno More Varna; Hebar Pazardzhik; Levski Sofia; Lokomotiv Plovdiv; Lokomotiv Sofia; Ludogorets Razgrad; Pirin Blagoevgrad; Septemvri Sofia; Slavia Sofia; Spartak Varna	Belasitsa Petrich; Dobrudzha Dobrich; Dunav Ruse; Etar Veliko Tarnovo; Krumovgrad; Litex Lovech; Maritsa Plovdiv; Minyor Pernik; Montana; Sozopol; Spartak Pleven; Sportist Svoge; Strumska Slava Radomir; Vitosha Bistritsa; Yantra Gabrovo	from North-East zone: Botev Novi Pazar; Chernolomets Popovo; Chernomorets Balchik; Svetkavitsa Targovishte; from North-West zone: Lokomotiv Gorna Oryahovitsa; Lokomotiv Mezdra; Partizan Cherven Bryag; Sevlievo; from South-West zone: Chavdar Etropole; Levski-Rakovski Sofia; Marek Dupnitsa; Vihren Sandanski; from South-East zone: Gigant Saedinenie; Rozova Dolina Kazanlak; Sayana Haskovo; Yambol

== Matches ==
=== Preliminary round ===
The draw was conducted on 2 September 2022. The games were played on 22 September 2022. In this stage participated the 16 winners from the regional amateur competitions and 15 non-reserve teams from the Second League. During the draw, Chernomorets Balchik received a bye to the round of 32.

22 September 2022	Yambol (III)	0−0 (a.e.t.) (1−4 p)	Spartak Pleven (II)	Yambol
16:00 UTC+3		Report		Stadium: Stadion Nikolay Laskov; Referee: Myumyun Mehmed (Burgas)
	Penalties
	Georgiev (penalty scored); Andonov (penalty missed); Yordzhev (penalty missed)		(penalty scored) Shopov; (penalty scored) Ivanov; (penalty scored) Antonov; (penalty scored) Karamfilov

22 September 2022	Rozova Dolina Kazanlak (III)	3−0	Yantra Gabrovo (II)	Kazanlak
16:00 UTC+3	Kolev 5' (pen.); V. Ivanov 10'; Chahov 89'	Report		Stadium: Stadion Sevtopolis; Referee: Stanislav Lazarov (Burgas)

22 September 2022	Lokomotiv Gorna Oryahovitsa (III)	1−3 (a.e.t.)	Minyor Pernik (II)	Gorna Oryahovitsa
16:00 UTC+3	Tsachev 65'	Report	Tyutyukov 35', 100'; Kostov 115'	Stadium: Stadion Lokomotiv; Referee: Stilyan Kolev (Veliko Tarnovo)

22 September 2022	Partizan Cherven Bryag (III)	0−3	Krumovgrad (II)	Cherven Bryag
16:00 UTC+3		Report	Stefanov 36', 57'; Tonev 45'	Stadium: Gradski stadion Referee: Vladimir Kirilov (Pleven)

22 September 2022	Vihren Sandanski (III)	2−0	Sozopol (II)	Sandanski
16:00 UTC+3	Tameghi 73', 82'	Report		Stadium: Stadion Spartak; Referee: Petar Nikolov (Sofia)

22 September 2022	Lokomotiv Mezdra (III)	0−1 (a.e.t.)	Litex Lovech (II)	Mezdra
16:00 UTC+3		Report	Georgiev 119'	Stadium: Stadion Lokomotiv; Referee: Blagoy Manov (Blagoevgrad)

22 September 2022	Marek Dupnitsa (III)	2−1 (a.e.t.)	Montana (II)	Dupnitsa
16:00 UTC+3	Ganchev 61'; Kalaydzhiyski 114'	Report	Tsekov 77'	Stadium: Stadion Bonchuk; Referee: Ventsislav Mitrev (Sofia)

22 September 2022	Sayana Haskovo (III)	1−2	Dunav Ruse (II)	Haskovo
16:00 UTC+3	Aleksiev 63'	Report	Markov 15'; Budinov 88'	Stadium: Stadion Haskovo; Referee: Stefan Gurkov (Sliven)

22 September 2022	Chernolomets Popovo (III)	1−3	Vitosha Bistritsa (II)	Popovo
16:00 UTC+3	Kanev 40'	Report	Sergiev 22'; Vachev 87', 90+2'	Stadium: Stadion Stamo Kostov; Referee: Dimitar Zhelyazkov (Silistra)

22 September 2022	Botev Novi Pazar (III)	0−3	Sportist Svoge (II)	Novi Pazar
16:00 UTC+3		Report	Rusinov 58'; Dikov 61'; Marinov 67'	Stadium: Gradski stadion Referee: Todor Kirov (Varna)

22 September 2022	Gigant Saedinenie (III)	2−1	Dobrudzha Dobrich (II)	Saedinenie
16:00 UTC+3	Shterev 46'; Skerlev 90+1'	Report	Lazarov 51'	Stadium: Stadion Saedinenie; Referee: Ryustem Karagaren (Asenovgrad)

22 September 2022	Chavdar Etropole (III)	1−0	Belasitsa Petrich (II)	Etropole
16:00 UTC+3	Krastev 86'	Report		Stadium: Stadion Chavdar; Referee: Lyuboslav Lyubomirov (Sofia)

22 September 2022	Sevlievo (III)	3−2	Etar Veliko Tarnovo (II)	Sevlievo
16:00 UTC+3	Vinicius 16'; D. Petrov 37'; Stoyanov 70'	Report	Pehlivanov 66'; Ivanov 80' (o.g.)	Stadium: Stadion Rakovski; Referee: Stanimir Todorov (Gabrovo)

22 September 2022	Levski-Rakovski Sofia (III)	2−3	Maritsa Plovdiv (II)	Sofia
16:00 UTC+3	Kolev 19'; Stoimenov 80' (pen.)	Report	Veshev 51', 70'; Peychinov 57'	Stadium: Stadion Rakovski; Referee: Lyubomir Vushovski (Sofia)

22 September 2022	Svetkavitsa Targovishte (III)	0−6	Strumska Slava Radomir (II)	Targovishte
16:00 UTC+3		Report	Panchev 1'; Tsanev 15'; Tungarov 19' (pen.); Nikolov 33'; Aleksandrov 87'; Dilchovski 90'	Stadium: Stadion Dimitar Burkov; Referee: Boris Popov (Ruse)

=== Round of 32 ===
The draw for this round, together with the draw for the round of 16, was conducted on 11 October 2022. The games shall be played between 16 and 27 November 2022. In this stage participate the 15 winners from the previous round, Chernomorets Balchik (who received a bye) and the 16 teams from the First League.

16 November 2022	Strumska Slava Radomir (II)	0−2	Spartak Varna (I)	Radomir
13:30 UTC+2		Report	Vasev 25'; Antwi 53'	Stadium: Gradski stadion Referee: Vasil Minev (Sofia)

18 November 2022	Rozova Dolina Kazanlak (III)	0−2	Ludogorets Razgrad (I)	Kazanlak
13:30 UTC+2		Report	Iliev 60'; Rick 90+1'	Stadium: Stadion Sevtopolis; Referee: Krasen Georgiev (Varna)

19 November 2022	Vihren Sandanski (III)	1−4	Levski Sofia (I)	Sandanski
13:30 UTC+2	Udoji 7'	Report	Ronaldo 24'; Kraev 31'; Welton 64'; Milanov 72' (pen.)	Stadium: Stadion Spartak; Referee: Ivaylo Nenkov (Sofia)

19 November 2022	Maritsa Plovdiv (II)	4−2	Hebar Pazardzhik (I)	Plovdiv
13:30 UTC+2	Apostolov 12'; Domovchiyski 43'; Marchev 57', 86'	Report	Mihaylov 3'; Tartov 75'	Stadium: Stadion Maritsa; Referee: Ventsislav Mitrev (Sofia)

19 November 2022	Dunav Ruse (II)	1−2	Arda Kardzhali (I)	Ruse
13:30 UTC+2	Dimitrov 83'	Report	Palmares 5'; Tilev 58'	Stadium: Gradski stadion Referee: Stoyan Arsov (Sofia)

19 November 2022	Chavdar Etropole (III)	2−0	Pirin Blagoevgrad (I)	Etropole
13:30 UTC+2	Botev 11', 36'	Report		Stadium: Stadion Chavdar; Referee: Mihael Pavlov (Veliko Tarnovo)

19 November 2022	Sportist Svoge (II)	1−2 (a.e.t.)	Slavia Sofia (I)	Svoge
13:30 UTC+2	Rusinov 71'	Report	Kerchev 45+1'; Tasev 94' (pen.)	Stadium: Stadion Chavdar Tsvetkov; Referee: Vasimir El-Hatib (Sofia)

19 November 2022	Vitosha Bistritsa (II)	1−0	Botev Vratsa (I)	Bistritsa
13:30 UTC+2	Kochilov 90+3' (pen.)	Report		Stadium: Stadion Bistritsa; Referee: Boris Popov (Ruse)

19 November 2022	Spartak Pleven (II)	1−4	Lokomotiv Sofia (I)	Pleven
13:30 UTC+2	Shopov 83'	Report	Nenov 26'; Vutov 38'; França 51'; Slavchev 57'	Stadium: Stadion Pleven; Referee: Georgi Ginchev (Veliko Tarnovo)

23 November 2022	Krumovgrad (II)	0−1	Septemvri Sofia (I)	Krumovgrad
13:30 UTC+2		Report	Chandarov 75'	Stadium: Stadion Krumovgrad; Referee: Stefan Gurkov (Sliven)

25 November 2022	Chernomorets Balchik (III)	0−3	Botev Plovdiv (I)	Balchik
12:30 UTC+2		Report	Manu 2', 23'; Mertens 68'	Stadium: Stadion Balchik; Referee: Ivelin Zanev (Ruse)

26 November 2022	Gigant Saedinenie (III)	1−1 (a.e.t.) (6−7 p)	CSKA Sofia (I)	Saedinenie
12:00 UTC+2	Staykov 41'	Report	Moreno 74'	Stadium: Stadion Saedinenie; Referee: Dimitar Dimitrov (Sofia)
	Penalties
	Skerlev (penalty scored); Shterev (penalty scored); Zdravkov (penalty scored); Hristov (penalty scored); Musai (penalty scored); Nikolov (penalty scored); Gyuzlev (penalty missed)		(penalty scored) Turitsov; (penalty scored) Lindseth; (penalty scored) Mattheij; (penalty scored) Garcez; (penalty scored) Moreno; (penalty scored) Carreazo; (penalty scored) Koch

26 November 2022	Minyor Pernik (II)	0−2	Beroe Stara Zagora (I)	Pernik
13:30 UTC+2		Report	Krastev 5'; Toungara 90+8'	Stadium: Stadion Minyor; Referee: Petar Kuzev (Gabrovo)

26 November 2022	Sevlievo (III)	0−4	CSKA 1948 Sofia (I)	Sevlievo
13:30 UTC+2		Report	Umarbayev 39'; Serdyuk 47', 61'; Aleksandrov 90' (pen.)	Stadium: Stadion Rakovski; Referee: Radoslav Gidzhenov (Plovdiv)

27 November 2022	Marek Dupnitsa (III)	0−1	Lokomotiv Plovdiv (I)	Dupnitsa
12:30 UTC+2		Report	Vitanov 45+2'	Stadium: Stadion Bonchuk; Referee: Valentin Zhelezov (Burgas)

27 November 2022	Litex Lovech (II)	0−2	Cherno More Varna (I)	Teteven (Note: Litex plays their first round home match at Stadion Georgi Benkovski, Teteven, instead of their regular stadium Gradski stadion in Lovech, which is undergoing renovation works.)
13:30 UTC+2		Report	Soula 51'; Isa 85'	Stadium: Stadion Georgi Benkovski; Referee: Kristiyan Kolev (Plovdiv)

=== Round of 16 ===
The draw was conducted on 11 October 2022, immediately after the draw for the round of 32. The games were played between 26 November and 4 December 2022. In this stage the participants are the 16 winners from the previous round.

26 November 2022	Maritsa Plovdiv (II)	1−1 (a.e.t.) (2−3 p)	Arda Kardzhali (I)	Plovdiv
13:30 UTC+2	Apostolov 116'	Report	N'Diaye 118'	Stadium: Stadion Maritsa; Referee: Ivaylo Nenkov (Sofia)
	Penalties
	Domovchiyski (penalty missed); Yanukov (penalty scored); Apostolov (penalty scored); Avramov (penalty missed); Nikolov (penalty missed)		(penalty scored) Kokonov; (penalty scored) N'Diaye; (penalty missed) Palmares; (penalty scored) Petkov

27 November 2022	Spartak Varna (I)	1−0 (a.e.t.)	Chavdar Etropole (III)	Varna
13:30 UTC+2	Dimitrov 106'	Report		Stadium: Stadion Spartak; Referee: Georgi Ivanov (Sofia)

28 November 2022	Lokomotiv Sofia (I)	3−0	Vitosha Bistritsa (II)	Sofia
12:00 UTC+2	Naydenov 45+1'; Dias 58'; Miloshev 80'	Report		Stadium: Stadion Lokomotiv; Referee: Stanislav Todorov (Shumen)

1 December 2022	Septemvri Sofia (I)	1−2	CSKA Sofia (I)	Sofia
12:00 UTC+2	Georgiev 83'	Report	Garcez 55'; Nazon 68' (pen.)	Stadium: Stadion Balgarska Armia (Note: Septemvri will play their round of 16 home game at Stadion Balgarska Armia, Sofia, instead of their regular stadium Stadion Septemvri, Sofia, which does not meet the BFU requirements.); Referee: Nikola Popov (Sofia)

2 December 2022	Beroe Stara Zagora (I)	0−2	CSKA 1948 Sofia (I)	Stara Zagora
12:30 UTC+2		Report	Serdyuk 53'; Kolev 90+3'	Stadium: Stadion Beroe; Referee: Dragomir Draganov (Varna)

3 December 2022	Slavia Sofia (I)	2−1	Botev Plovdiv (I)	Sofia
12:00 UTC+2	Dobrev 18'; Nguena 52'	Report	Manu 16'	Stadium: Stadion Aleksandar Shalamanov; Referee: Georgi Ginchev (Veliko Tarnovo)

3 December 2022	Cherno More Varna (I)	3−1	Lokomotiv Plovdiv (I)	Varna
15:00 UTC+2	Coureur 45+1', 66'; Angelov 90+3'	Report	Karagaren 37'	Stadium: Stadion Ticha; Referee: Stanimir Trenchev (Sofia)

4 December 2022	Ludogorets Razgrad (I)	2−1	Levski Sofia (I)	Razgrad
13:30 UTC+2	Thiago 69'; Tekpetey 79'	Report	Welton 60'	Stadium: Huvepharma Arena; Referee: Georgi Davidov (Veliko Tarnovo)

=== Quarter-finals ===
The draw was conducted on 12 December 2022. The games were played between 3 and 5 April 2023. In this stage the participants are the 8 winners from the previous round.

3 April 2023	Lokomotiv Sofia	2−1	Slavia Sofia	Sofia
18:30 UTC+3	Bakalov 15'; Raynov 90+4'	Report	Ahmedov 73'	Stadium: Stadion Lokomotiv; Referee: Georgi Kabakov (Plovdiv)

4 April 2023	Ludogorets Razgrad	2−1	Spartak Varna	Razgrad
17:00 UTC+3	Caio Vidal 38'; Show 76'	Report	Belousov 25'	Stadium: Huvepharma Arena; Referee: Vladimir Valkov (Plovdiv)

4 April 2023	CSKA Sofia	1−2	Cherno More Varna	Sofia
20:00 UTC+3	Drobarov 90+3' (o.g.)	Report	Iliev 51' (pen.); Vion 65' (o.g.)	Stadium: Stadion Balgarska Armia; Referee: Georgi Dimitrov (Sofia)

5 April 2023	Arda Kardzhali	0−1 (a.e.t.)	CSKA 1948 Sofia	Kardzhali
18:30 UTC+3		Report	Pedrinho 117' (pen.)	Stadium: Arena Arda; Referee: Valentin Zhelezov (Burgas)

=== Semi-finals ===
The draw was conducted on 6 April 2023. The first legs were played on 25 and 26 April, while the second legs were scheduled for 10 and 11 May 2023. From this season onwards, the away goals rule will not apply in accordance with the generally accepted regulations in European football.

==== First legs ====
25 April 2023	Cherno More Varna	1−2	Ludogorets Razgrad	Varna
18:30 UTC+3	Fernandes 13'	Report	Nonato 18'; Plastun 34'	Stadium: Stadion Ticha; Referee: Volen Chinkov (Sofia)

26 April 2023	Lokomotiv Sofia	2−3	CSKA 1948 Sofia	Sofia
18:30 UTC+3	Naydenov 17'; Malembana 50'	Report	Sidcley 30'; Kirilov 32'; Pedrinho 41'	Stadium: Stadion Lokomotiv; Referee: Radoslav Gidzhenov (Plovdiv)

==== Second legs ====
10 May 2023	CSKA 1948 Sofia	2−2 (a.e.t.) (5−4 agg.)	Lokomotiv Sofia	Bistritsa
19:00 UTC+3	Chochev 28' (pen.), 117'	Report	Malembana 9'; Raposo 18'	Stadium: Stadion Bistritsa; Referee: Georgi Kabakov (Plovdiv)

11 May 2023	Ludogorets Razgrad	1−2 (a.e.t.) (3−3 agg.) (4−1 p)	Cherno More Varna	Razgrad
19:00 UTC+3	Delev 58'	Report	Panayotov 55'; Machado 90+6'	Stadium: Huvepharma Arena; Referee: Radoslav Gidzhenov (Plovdiv)
	Penalties
	Verdon (penalty scored); Tekpetey (penalty scored); Nedelev (penalty scored); Caio Vidal (penalty scored)		(penalty missed) Iliev; (penalty scored) Fernandes; (penalty missed) Pacheco

=== Final ===
24 May 2023
19:00 UTC+3

CSKA 1948	1–3	Ludogorets Razgrad
Chochev 59'	Report	Caio Vidal 8', 43'; Tissera 81'

Vasil Levski National Stadium, Sofia
Attendance: 1,400
Referee: Dragomir Draganov (Varna)

== Bracket ==
Round of 32
2	Spartak Pleven	1
1	Lokomotiv Sofia	4
2	Vitosha Bistritsa	1
1	Botev Vratsa	0
2	Sportist Svoge	1
1	Slavia Sofia (a.e.t.)	2
3	Chernomorets Balchik	0
1	Botev Plovdiv	3
2	Maritsa Plovdiv	4
1	Hebar Pazardzhik	2
2	Dunav Ruse	1
1	Arda Kardzhali	2
2	Minyor Pernik	0
1	Beroe Stara Zagora	2
3	Sevlievo	0
1	CSKA 1948 Sofia	4
2	Krumovgrad	0
1	Septemvri Sofia	1
3	Gigant Saedinenie	1 (6)
1	CSKA Sofia (p)	1 (7)
2	Litex Lovech	0
1	Cherno More Varna	2
3	Marek Dupnitsa	0
1	Lokomotiv Plovdiv	1
3	Rozova Dolina Kazanlak	0
1	Ludogorets Razgrad	2
3	Vihren Sandanski	1
1	Levski Sofia	4
2	Strumska Slava Radomir	0
1	Spartak Varna	2
3	Chavdar Etropole	2
1	Pirin Blagoevgrad	0

Round of 16
1	Lokomotiv Sofia	3
2	Vitosha Bistritsa	0
1	Slavia Sofia	2
1	Botev Plovdiv	1
2	Maritsa Plovdiv	1 (2)
1	Arda Kardzhali (p)	1 (3)
1	Beroe Stara Zagora	0
1	CSKA 1948 Sofia	2
1	Septemvri Sofia	1
1	CSKA Sofia	2
1	Cherno More Varna	3
1	Lokomotiv Plovdiv	1
1	Ludogorets Razgrad	2
1	Levski Sofia	1
1	Spartak Varna (a.e.t.)	1
3	Chavdar Etropole	0

Quarter-finals
1	Lokomotiv Sofia	2
1	Slavia Sofia	1
1	Arda Kardzhali	0
1	CSKA 1948 Sofia (a.e.t.)	1
1	CSKA Sofia	1
1	Cherno More Varna	2
1	Ludogorets Razgrad	2
1	Spartak Varna	1

Semi-finals
1	Lokomotiv Sofia	2	2
1	CSKA 1948 Sofia (a.e.t.)	3	2
1	Cherno More Varna	1	2 (1)
1	Ludogorets Razgrad (p)	2	1 (4)

Final
1	CSKA 1948 Sofia	1
1	Ludogorets Razgrad	3
