= Maurício Garcez =

Brazilian footballer

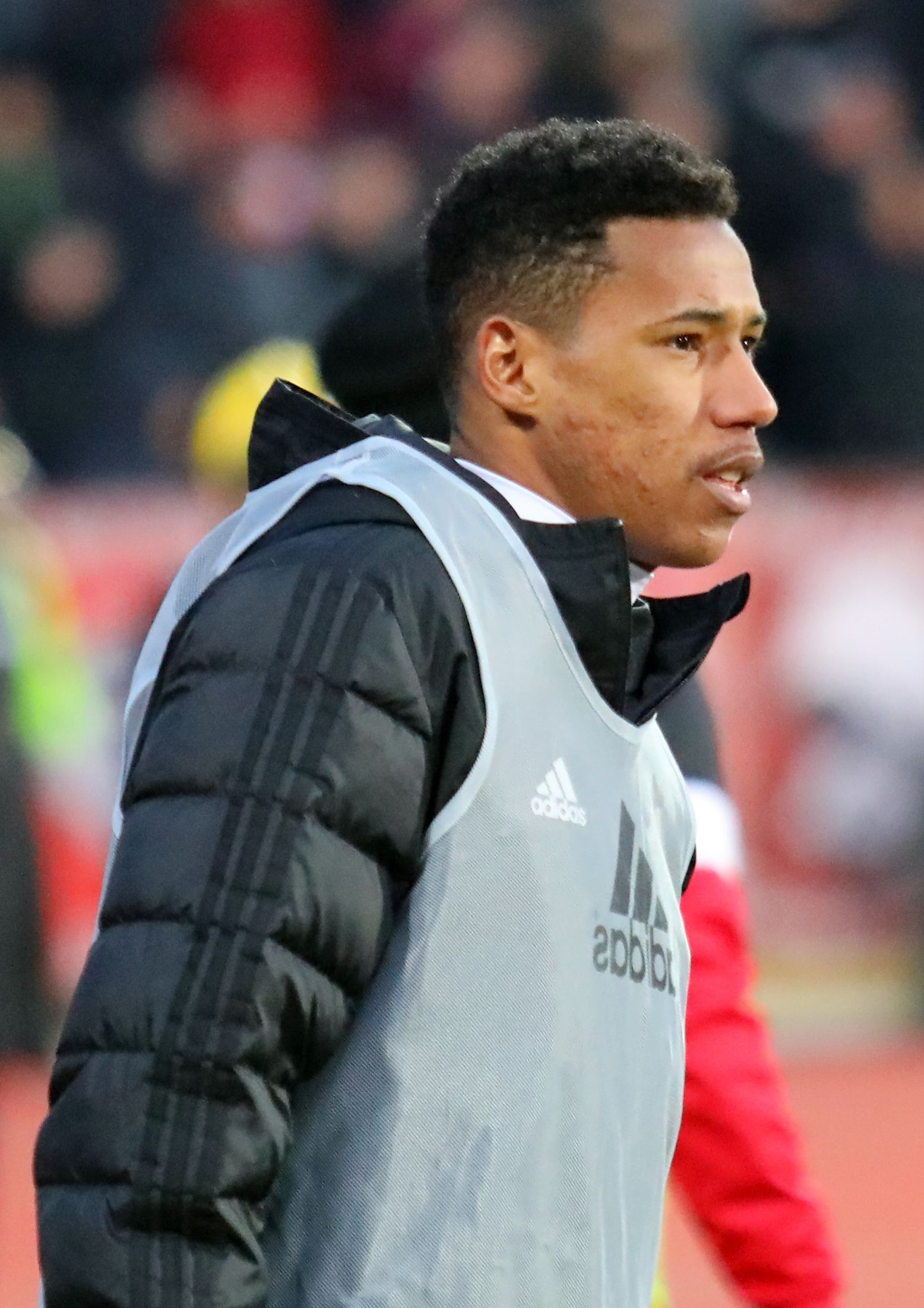
- Garcez with CSKA Sofia in 2022

Personal information
- Full name: Maurício Garcez de Jesus
- Date of birth: 16 March 1997 (age 29)
- Place of birth: Chapadinha, Brazil
- Height: 1.83 m (6 ft 0 in)
- Position: Winger

Team information
- Current team: Chapecoense
- Number: 31

Senior career*
Years	Team	Apps	(Gls)
2018–2020	Chapadinha	7	(1)
2018–2019	→ Maranhão (loan)	4	(0)
2019	→ Ferroviário (loan)	0	(0)
2019	→ Juventude Samas (loan)	0	(0)
2020	→ Doce Mel (loan)	8	(5)
2020–2023	Brusque	48	(11)
2022–2023	→ CSKA Sofia (loan)	41	(11)
2023	→ Coritiba (loan)	14	(1)
2024–2026	Avaí	58	(10)
2025	→ Juventude (loan)	3	(0)
2025	→ Paysandu (loan)	22	(7)
2026–	Chapecoense	2	(0)
- * Club domestic league appearances and goals as of 9 April 2026

Maurício Garcez de Jesus (born 16 March 1997) is a Brazilian professional footballer who plays as a winger for Chapecoense.

== Career ==
=== Early career ===
Born in Chapadinha, Maranhão, Garcez began his career with hometown side Chapadinha FC in the 2018 Campeonato Maranhense Second Division. He moved to Maranhão on loan shortly after, and helped the side to win the Copa Federação Maranhense de Futebol.

After playing in the 2019 Campeonato Maranhense for MAC, Garcez moved to Ferroviário also on loan, where he failed to make an appearance. He later joined Juventude Samas also in a temporary deal, winning another Copa FMF title.

Garcez played the 2020 Campeonato Baiano while on loan at Doce Mel, scoring five goals in just eight matches.

=== Brusque ===
On 18 August 2020, Garcez joined Série C side Brusque. On 6 October, he renewed his contract with the club until 2024, and finished the year as a starter as the club achieved promotion to the Série B.

==== Loan to CSKA Sofia ====
On 13 January 2022, Garcez joined Bulgarian club CSKA Sofia on loan. He made his debut on 13 February in a 1–1 away draw against Lokomotiv Sofia on the opening day of the spring half-season 2021–22 season.

==== Loan to Coritiba ====
On 11 July 2023, Garcez moved to Série A side Coritiba on loan until the end of the year. He made his top tier debut nineteen days later, coming on as a second-half substitute for Robson in a 4–1 away loss to Botafogo, and scored his first goal in the category on 29 October, netting the opener in a 4–3 win at Internacional.

=== Avaí ===
On 21 December 2023, Garcez signed a four-year deal with Avaí.

==== Loan to Juventude ====
On 14 March 2025, Garcez moved to Juventude in the top tier, on loan until December.

== Career statistics ==
As of 21 March 2025.

Appearances and goals by club, season and competition
Club	Season	League			State league		National cup		Continental		Other		Total	
Club	Season	Division	Apps	Goals	Apps	Goals	Apps	Goals	Apps	Goals	Apps	Goals	Apps	Goals
Chapadinha	2018	Maranhense 2ª Divisão	—		7	1	—		—		—		7	1
Maranhão (loan)	2018	Maranhense	—		—		—		—		4 (Note: Appearance(s) in Copa Federação Maranhense de Futebol)	3	4	3
Maranhão (loan)	2019	Série D	0	0	4	0	—		—		—		4	0
Maranhão (loan)	Total		0	0	4	0	—		—		4	3	8	3
Ferroviário (loan)	2019	Série C	0	0	—		—		—		—		0	0
Juventude Samas (loan)	2019	Maranhense 2ª Divisão	—		—		—		—		8	6	8	6
Doce Mel (loan)	2020	Baiano	—		8	5	—		—		—		8	5
Brusque	2020	Série C	19	5	—		2	0	—		—		21	5
Brusque	2021	Série B	29	6	12	2	—		—		—		41	8
Brusque	Total		48	11	12	2	2	0	—		—		62	13
CSKA Sofia (loan)	2021–22	First League	10	1	—		3	0	—		—		13	1
CSKA Sofia (loan)	2022–23	First League	31	10	—		3	1	6 (Note: Appearance(s) in UEFA Conference League)	1	—		40	12
CSKA Sofia (loan)	Total		41	11	—		6	1	6	1	—		53	13
Coritiba (loan)	2023	Série A	14	1	—		—		—		—		14	1
Avaí	2024	Série B	33	5	15	4	—		—		—		48	9
Avaí	2025	Série B	0	0	4	0	—		—		—		4	0
Avaí	Total		33	5	19	4	—		—		—		52	9
Juventude (loan)	2025	Série A	0	0	—		—		—		—		0	0
Career total			136	28	50	12	8	1	6	1	12	9	212	51

== Honours ==
Maranhão

- Copa Federação Maranhense de Futebol: 2018

Juventude Samas

- Copa Federação Maranhense de Futebol: 2019
