= Martin Achkov =

Bulgarian footballer (born 1999)

Personal information
- Full name: Martin Hristov Achkov
- Date of birth: 10 July 1999 (age 27)
- Place of birth: Sofia, Bulgaria
- Height: 1.86 m (6 ft 1 in)
- Position: Left back

Team information
- Current team: Botev Vratsa
- Number: 11

Youth career
- CSKA Sofia

Senior career*
Years	Team	Apps	(Gls)
2018–2019	Litex Lovech	1	(0)
2019–2020	Slavia Sofia	0	(0)
2020	→ Spartak Varna (loan)	4	(0)
2020–2023	Septemvri Sofia	85	(4)
2024–	Botev Vratsa	49	(1)
- * Club domestic league appearances and goals as of 11 June 2026

Martin Achkov (Bulgarian: Мартин Ачков; born 10 July 1999) is a Bulgarian professional footballer who plays as a left back for Botev Vratsa.

== Career ==
Achkov began his career in CSKA Sofia and Litex Lovech, before moving to Slavia Sofia in the summer of 2019. In January 2020, he was sent on loan to Spartak Varna until end of season.

In the summer of 2020, he signed with Septemvri Sofia. He become main player to the team and helped the team with the promotion to First League in 2022. He completed his professional debut in the first league match of the season against Ludogorets Razgrad.
