= Kaloyan Krastev =

Bulgarian footballer

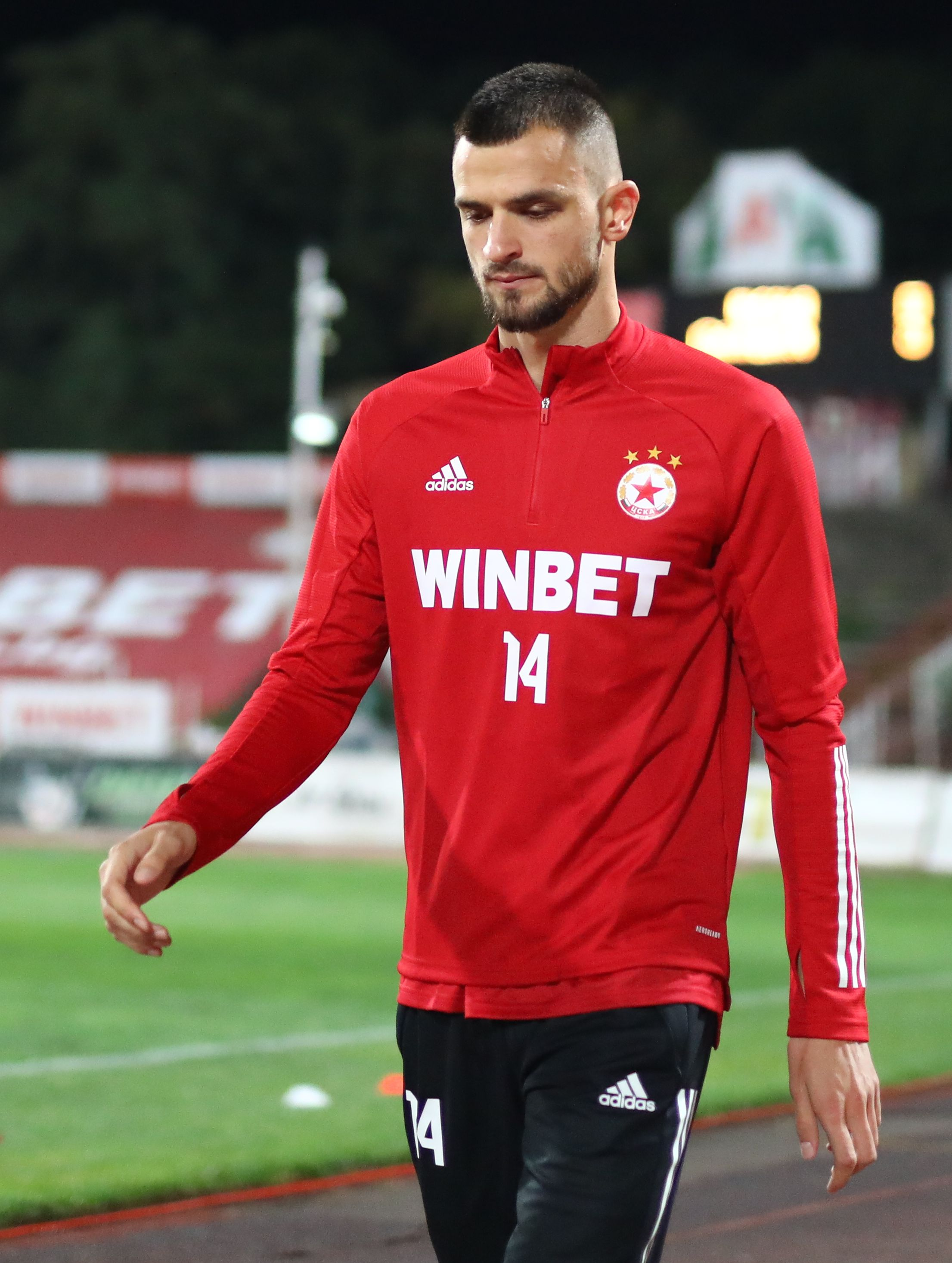

Personal information
- Full name: Kaloyan Ivaylov Krastev
- Date of birth: 24 January 1999 (age 27)
- Place of birth: Sofia, Bulgaria
- Height: 1.92 m (6 ft 4 in)
- Position: Forward

Team information
- Current team: Vihren Sandanski
- Number: 9

Youth career
- 2007–2010: CSKA Sofia
- 2010–2016: Slavia Sofia
- 2018–2019: Bologna

Senior career*
Years	Team	Apps	(Gls)
2015–2018	Slavia Sofia	53	(3)
2018–2020	Bologna	0	(0)
2019–2020	→ Slavia Sofia (loan)	21	(2)
2020–2021	Slavia Sofia	34	(5)
2021–2023	CSKA Sofia	22	(0)
2022–2023	→ Beroe (loan)	17	(1)
2023–2024	Lokomotiv Sofia	29	(1)
2024	Hebar	15	(1)
2025	CSKA 1948 II	11	(2)
2025	Chernomorets Burgas	13	(2)
2026	Belasitsa Petrich	13	(4)
2026–	Vihren Sandanski	0	(0)

International career^{‡}
2015–2016	Bulgaria U17	5	(1)
2017	Bulgaria U18	1	(0)
2016–2018	Bulgaria U19	15	(8)
2017–2020	Bulgaria U21	20	(2)
2021	Bulgaria	5	(0)
- * Club domestic league appearances and goals as of 24 May 2026 ‡ National team caps and goals as of 12 October 2020

Kaloyan Krastev (Bulgarian: Калоян Кръстев; born 24 January 1999) is a Bulgarian professional footballer who plays as a forward for Vihren Sandanski.

== Career ==
=== Slavia Sofia ===
Krastev made his senior debut for Slavia on 7 December 2015, coming on as a substitute for Daudet N'Dongala in a 3–0 win against Lokomotiv Plovdiv.

On 3 April 2017 he signed a professional contract with the team until 31 July 2020.

He scored his debut goal for the team in the league on 15 April 2017 in a match against Montana, won by Slavia with 4:3.

=== Bologna ===
On 24 January 2018, Krastev signed a 4-year contract with the Serie A team Bologna with the transfer fee reported to be a 1.5 million euro.

=== Bеroe ===
After seeing limited action with CSKA Sofia, in September 2022 Krastev was loaned out to Beroe.

== International career ==
=== Youth levels ===
Krastev was called up for the Bulgaria U19 team for the 2017 European Under-19 Championship qualification from 22 to 27 March 2017. He scored the first goal in the match against France U19 which was won by Bulgaria 2–1. He became a hero for the team in the next match against Bosnia and Herzegovina U19, scoring 2 goals for the 3–1 win and qualifying Bulgaria for the knockout phase.

=== Senior ===
He made his debut for Bulgaria national football team on 2 September 2021 in a World Cup qualifier against Italy that ended in a 1–1 away draw. He substituted the goal-scorer Atanas Iliev in the 79th minute.

== Career statistics ==
=== Club ===
As of 22 February 2025

Club performance			League		Cup		Continental		Other		Total	
Club	League	Season	Apps	Goals	Apps	Goals	Apps	Goals	Apps	Goals	Apps	Goals
Bulgaria			League		Bulgarian Cup		Europe		Other (Note: Includes Bulgarian Supercup matches.)		Total	
Slavia Sofia	A Group	2015–16	10	0	0	0	–		–		10	0
Slavia Sofia	First League	2016–17	23	1	0	0	2	0	4 (Note: Relegation Play-offs)	0	29	1
Slavia Sofia	First League	2017–18	20	2	3	1	–		0	0	23	3
Slavia Sofia (loan)	First League	2019–20	20	2	2	2	–		1 (Note: European_play-offs)	0	23	4
Slavia Sofia	First League	2020–21	28	3	5	3	1	1	–		34	7
Slavia Sofia	First League	2021–22	6	2	0	0	–		–		6	2
Slavia Sofia	Total		107	10	10	6	3	1	5	0	126	17
Bologna	Serie A	2017–18	0	0	0	0	–		–		0	0
Bologna	Serie A	2018–19	0	0	0	0	–		–		0	0
CSKA Sofia	First League	2021–22	18	0	2	0	5	0	—		25	0
CSKA Sofia	First League	2022–23	4	0	0	0	2	0	—		6	0
CSKA Sofia	Total		22	0	2	0	7	0	0	0	31	0
Beroe (loan)	First League	2022–23	17	1	2	1	—		—		19	2
Lokomotiv Sofia	First League	2023–24	26	1	1	0	—		—		27	1
Hebar	First League	2024–25	15	1	1	0	—		—		16	1
CSKA 1948	First League	2024–25	0	0	0	0	—		—		0	0
CSKA 1948 II	Second League	2024–25	2	0	0	0	—		—		2	0
Career statistics			190	13	16	7	10	1	5	0	222	21
