= Asen Donchev =

Bulgarian footballer (born 2001)

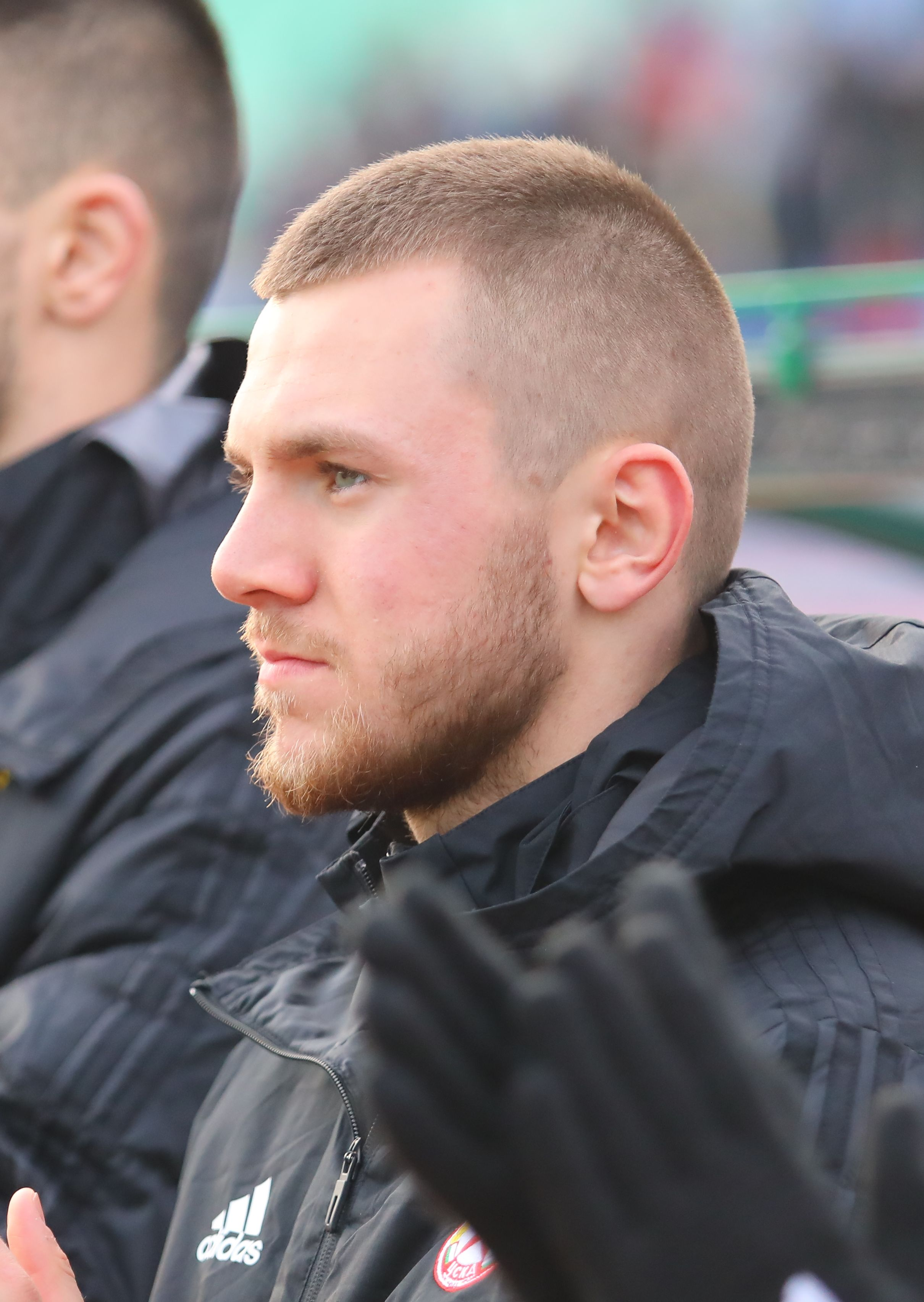

Personal information
- Full name: Asen Petrov Donchev
- Date of birth: 22 October 2001 (age 25)
- Place of birth: Blagoevgrad, Bulgaria
- Height: 1.76 m (5 ft 9 in)
- Positions: Right back; winger

Team information
- Current team: Cherno More
- Number: 8

Youth career
- –2016: Litex Lovech
- 2016–2020: CSKA Sofia

Senior career*
Years	Team	Apps	(Gls)
2020–2024	CSKA Sofia	22	(1)
2024	→ Pirin Blagoevgrad (loan)	12	(0)
2024–	Cherno More	66	(7)

International career^{‡}
2019	Bulgaria U18	3	(0)
2019–2020	Bulgaria U19	6	(0)
2021	Bulgaria U21	2	(0)
- * Club domestic league appearances and goals as of 17:22, 26 May 2026 (UTC) ‡ National team caps and goals as of 19:58, 16 October 2021 (UTC)

Asen Donchev (Bulgarian: Асен Дончев; born 22 October 2001) is a Bulgarian professional footballer who plays as a right back or winger for First League club Cherno More Varna.

== Career ==
Donchev joined CSKA Sofia from the Litex academy in 2016. He made his senior debut on 21 April 2021, in a 6–1 league win over Montana at Bulgarian Army Stadium, replacing Graham Carey for the final 15 minutes. On 25 July 2022, Donchev scored his first goal for the team, netting the winner in a 1–0 league victory over Cherno More.

== Career statistics ==
=== Club ===
As of 26 May 2026

Club	Division	Season	League		Cup		Europe		Total	
Club	Division	Season	Apps	Goals	Apps	Goals	Apps	Goals	Apps	Goals
CSKA Sofia	First League	2020–21	2	0	0	0	0	0	2	0
CSKA Sofia	First League	2021–22	9	0	2	0	1	0	12	0
CSKA Sofia	First League	2022–23	7	1	0	0	2	0	9	1
CSKA Sofia	First League	2022–23	4	0	1	0	1	0	6	0
CSKA Sofia	Total		22	1	3	0	4	0	29	1
Pirin Blagoevgrad (loan)	First League	2023–24	12	0	1	0	—		13	0
Cherno More	First League	2024–25	32	4	4	0	2	0	38	4
Cherno More	First League	2025–26	34	3	2	0	2	0	38	3
Cherno More	Total		66	7	6	0	4	0	76	7
Career Total			100	8	10	0	8	0	118	8

== Honours ==
CSKA Sofia

- Bulgarian Cup (1): 2020–21

Cherno More

- Third place (1): 2024–25
