= Brayan Moreno (footballer, born 1999) =

Colombian footballer (born 1999)

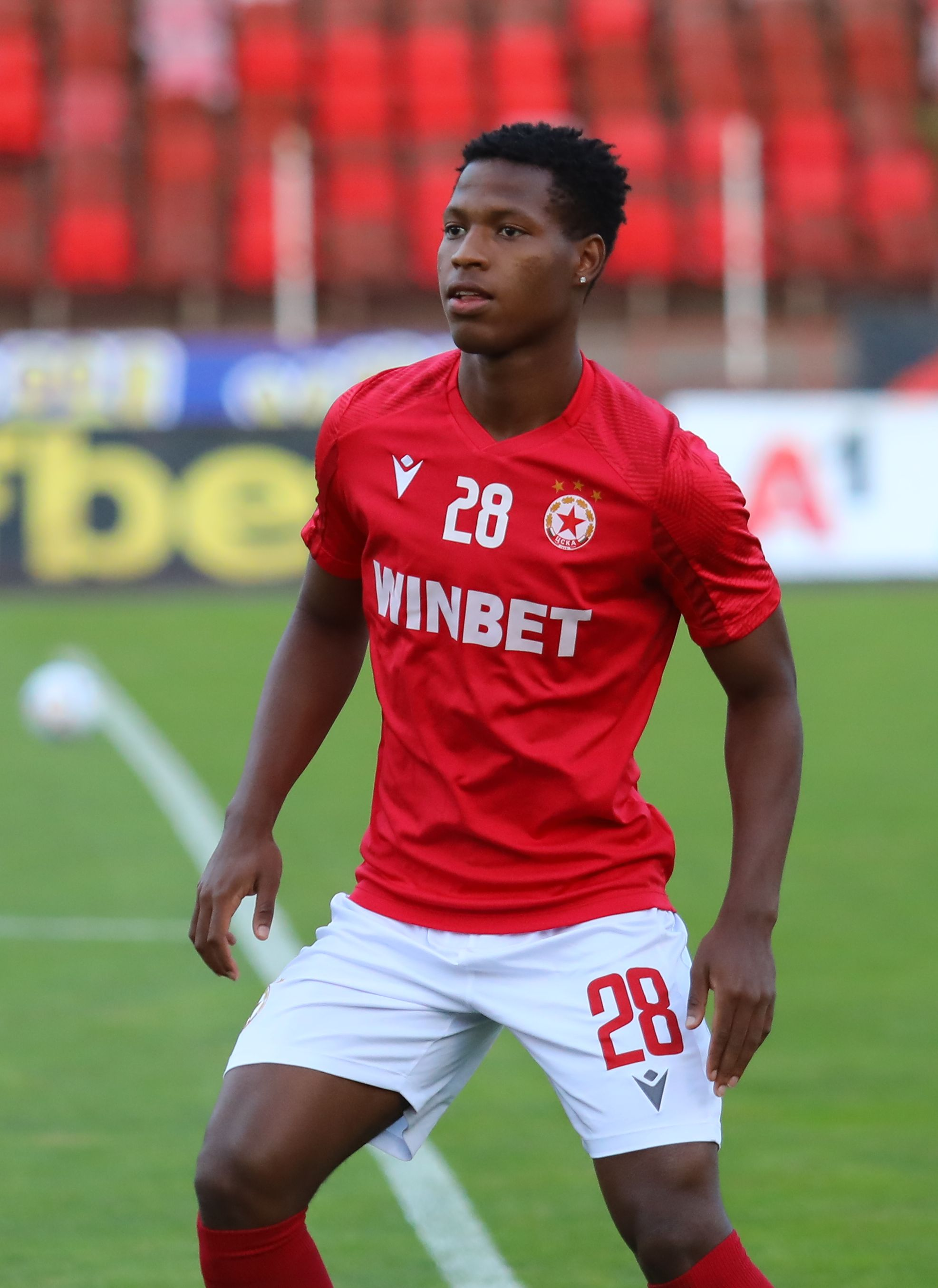
- Brayan Moreno with CSKA Sofia in 2022

Personal information
- Full name: Brayan Moreno Álvarez
- Date of birth: 2 August 1999 (age 27)
- Place of birth: Antioquia, Colombia
- Height: 1.78 m (5 ft 10 in)
- Position: Forward

Senior career*
Years	Team	Apps	(Gls)
2019–2021	Atlético Huila	67	(15)
2022–2024	CSKA Sofia	31	(9)
2024	Neftçi	15	(4)
- * Club domestic league appearances and goals as of 06:46, 10 October 2024 (UTC)

Brayan Moreno Álvarez (born 2 August 1999) is a Colombian professional footballer who plays as a forward.

== Career ==
Moreno transferred to CSKA Sofia during the winter of 2022. Being injured when he came to Bulgaria, his debut was delayed. After making his debut, he was omitted from the matchday squad for yet another period. He started the 2022–23 campaign with 2 goals in July.

On 21 January 2024, Azerbaijan Premier League club Neftçi announced the signing of Moreno from CSKA Sofia, to a 1.5-year contract. On 9 October 2024, Neftçi announced the termination of Moreno's contract by mutual consent.

== Career statistics ==
As of 18 May 2024

Appearances and goals by club, season and competition
Club	Season	League			National cup		Continental		Total	
Club	Season	Division	Apps	Goals	Apps	Goals	Apps	Goals	Apps	Goals
Atlético Huila	2019	Categoría Primera A	4	0	0	0	–		4	0
Atlético Huila	2020	Categoría Primera B	22	6	2	1	–		24	7
Atlético Huila	2021	Categoría Primera A	19	3	0	0	–		19	3
Atlético Huila	2021	Categoría Primera B	22	6	1	1	–		23	7
Atlético Huila	Total		67	15	3	2	–		70	17
CSKA Sofia	2021–22	First League	3	0	–		–		3	0
CSKA Sofia	2022–23	First League	25	9	3	1	5 (Note: Appearances in UEFA Europa Conference League)	0	33	10
CSKA Sofia	2023–24	First League	3	0	0	0	0	0	3	0
CSKA Sofia	Total		31	9	3	1	5	0	39	10
Neftçi	2023–24	Azerbaijan Premier League	15	4	3	0	–		18	4
Career total			112	27	9	3	5	0	126	30
