= Stanislav Shopov =

Bulgarian footballer

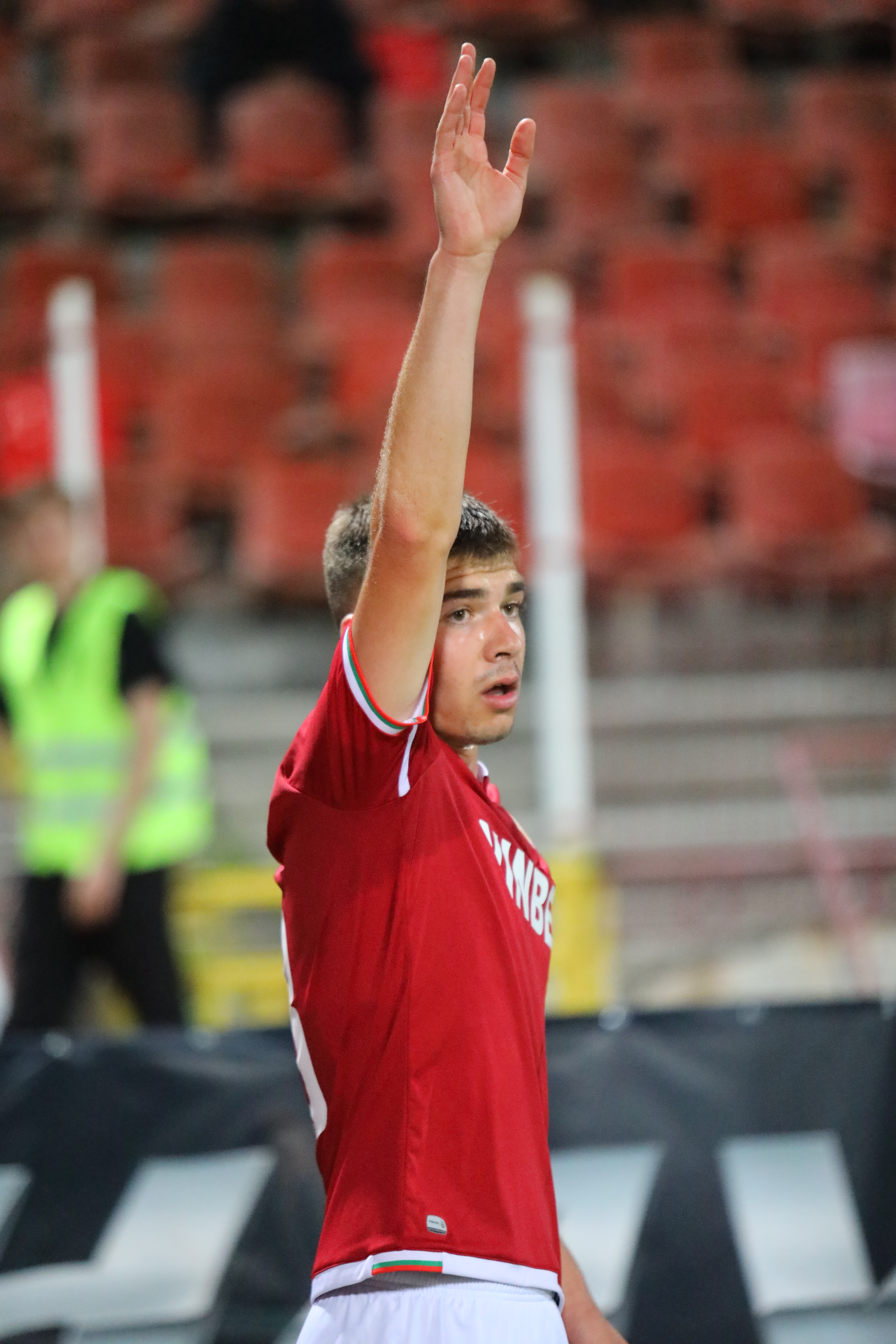
- Shopov in 2022 with CSKA Sofia

Personal information
- Full name: Stanislav Tihomirov Shopov
- Date of birth: 23 February 2002 (age 24)
- Place of birth: Plovdiv, Bulgaria
- Height: 1.79 m (5 ft 10 in)
- Position: Midfielder

Team information
- Current team: Botev Plovdiv
- Number: 11

Youth career
- 2009–2018: Botev Plovdiv

Senior career*
| Years | Team | Apps | (Gls) |
| 2018–2020 | Botev Plovdiv | 39 | (1) |
| 2020–2022 | Heerenveen | 1 | (0) |
| 2022–2025 | CSKA Sofia | 85 | (10) |
| 2024 | CSKA Sofia II | 2 | (0) |
| 2025–2026 | Osijek | 13 | (0) |
| 2026– | → Botev Plovdiv (loan) | 0 | (0) |

International career^{‡}
| 2017–2018 | Bulgaria U16 | 9 | (2) |
| 2017–2018 | Bulgaria U17 | 9 | (1) |
| 2019–2021 | Bulgaria U19 | 8 | (1) |
| 2021–2024 | Bulgaria U21 | 19 | (2) |
| 2023– | Bulgaria | 8 | (0) |
- * Club domestic league appearances and goals as of 15 June 2026 ‡ National team caps and goals as of 23:02, 18 November 2025 (UTC)

Stanislav Tihomirov Shopov (Bulgarian: Станислав Тихомиров Шопов; born 23 February 2002) is a Bulgarian professional footballer who plays as a midfielder for Bulgarian First League club Botev Plovdiv.

== Career ==
=== Club ===
Shopov began his youth career at Botev Plovdiv, at age seven. On 10 May 2018, Shopov signed his first professional contract with the club. He made his first-team debut on 15 May 2018 in a 2–0 win over Vereya Stara Zagora, coming on as a substitute in the latter minutes of the game.

On 6 October 2020, Shopov signed a two-year contract with the option of another season with Dutch Eredivisie club SC Heerenveen.

In June 2022, Shopov joined CSKA Sofia.

=== International ===
In March 2023, Shopov was called up to the Bulgaria national team as a replacement for the injured Dominik Yankov, becoming part of the squad for the Euro 2026 qualifiers against Montenegro and Hungary. He earned his first cap on 27 March 2023, in the 0:3 away loss against the latter, coming on as a late second-half substitute for Ilia Gruev.

== Career statistics ==
As of 24 September 2025

Appearances and goals by club, season and competition
| Club | Season | League | | | National Cup | | Europe | | Other | | Total | |
| Club | Season | Division | Apps | Goals | Apps | Goals | Apps | Goals | Apps | Goals | Apps | Goals |
|---|---|---|---|---|---|---|---|---|---|---|---|---|
| Botev Plovdiv | 2017–18 | First League | 1 | 0 | 0 | 0 | 0 | 0 | 0 | 0 | 1 | 0 |
| Botev Plovdiv | 2018–19 | First League | 4 | 0 | 1 | 0 | 0 | 0 | 0 | 0 | 5 | 0 |
| Botev Plovdiv | 2019–20 | First League | 27 | 1 | 5 | 0 | 0 | 0 | 0 | 0 | 31 | 1 |
| Botev Plovdiv | 2020–21 | First League | 7 | 0 | 0 | 0 | 0 | 0 | 0 | 0 | 7 | 0 |
| Botev Plovdiv | Total | | 39 | 1 | 6 | 0 | 0 | 0 | 0 | 0 | 45 | 1 |
| Heerenveen | 2020–21 | Eredivisie | 0 | 0 | 0 | 0 | 0 | 0 | 0 | 0 | 0 | 0 |
| Heerenveen | 2021–22 | Eredivisie | 1 | 0 | 0 | 0 | 0 | 0 | 0 | 0 | 1 | 0 |
| Heerenveen | Total | | 1 | 0 | 0 | 0 | 0 | 0 | 0 | 0 | 1 | 0 |
| CSKA Sofia | 2022–23 | First League | 29 | 1 | 3 | 0 | 5 | 0 | 0 | 0 | 37 | 1 |
| CSKA Sofia | 2023–24 | First League | 26 | 3 | 4 | 0 | 2 | 0 | 1 | 0 | 33 | 3 |
| CSKA Sofia | 2024–25 | First League | 30 | 6 | 5 | 0 | 0 | 0 | 1 | 0 | 36 | 6 |
| CSKA Sofia | Total | | 85 | 10 | 12 | 0 | 7 | 0 | 2 | 0 | 107 | 10 |
| CSKA Sofia II | 2024–25 | Second League | 2 | 0 | – | | – | | – | | 2 | 0 |
| Osijek | 2025–26 | Croatian Football League | 7 | 0 | 1 | 1 | – | | – | | 8 | 1 |
| Career total | | | 135 | 11 | 19 | 1 | 7 | 0 | 2 | 0 | 162 | 12 |

=== International ===
As of match played 18 November 2025

Appearances and goals by national team and year
| National team | Year | Apps | Goals |
|---|---|---|---|
Bulgaria
| Bulgaria | 2023 | 2 | 0 |
| Bulgaria | 2025 | 6 | 0 |
| Total | | 8 | 0 |
