= Galin Minkov =

Bulgarian footballer

Personal information
- Full name: Galin Stanimirov Minkov
- Date of birth: 2 November 1997 (age 29)
- Place of birth: Troyan, Bulgaria
- Height: 1.78 m (5 ft 10 in)
- Position: Left-back

Team information
- Current team: Rilski Sportist
- Number: 13

Youth career
- Litex Lovech

Senior career*
Years	Team	Apps	(Gls)
2015–2016	Litex Lovech II	10	(0)
2016	→ Lokomotiv Mezdra (loan)	3	(0)
2016–2017	CSKA Sofia II	2	(0)
2016–2023	CSKA Sofia	3	(0)
2016–2018	→ Tsarsko Selo (loan)	26	(1)
2018	→ Litex Lovech (loan)	3	(0)
2019	→ Tsarsko Selo (loan)	2	(0)
2019–2022	→ Litex Lovech (loan)	73	(0)
2023	Lokomotiv Sofia	9	(0)
2024	Dunav Ruse	9	(0)
2024	Montana	9	(0)
2025	Fratria	9	(0)
2025–	Rilski Sportist	26	(0)

International career
2013	Bulgaria U16	2	(0)
2013	Bulgaria U17	2	(0)
2015	Bulgaria U18	1	(0)
2015–2016	Bulgaria U19	7	(0)
2016	Bulgaria U21	1	(0)
- * Club domestic league appearances and goals as of 11:18, 30 June 2026 (UTC)

Galin Minkov (Bulgarian: Галин Минков; born 2 November 1997) is a Bulgarian professional footballer who plays as a left-back for Rilski Sportist Samokov.

== Career ==
Minkov started his career in Litex Lovech. In 2016 he moved to CSKA Sofia. After spending several seasons on loan to Tsarsko Selo Sofia and Litex Lovech, he was recalled in the first team of CSKA Sofia by Saša Ilić. He completed his professional debut for the club on 14 August 2022 in a league match against Septemvri Sofia.

== Career statistics ==
=== Club ===
As of match played 7 October 2024.

Appearances and goals by club, season and competition
Club	Season	League			Cup		Europe		Other		Total	
Club	Season	Division	Apps	Goals	Apps	Goals	Apps	Goals	Apps	Goals	Apps	Goals
Litex Lovech	2014–15	A Group	0	0	—		—		—		0	0
Litex Lovech II	2015–16	B Group	10	0	—		—		—		10	0
Lokomotiv Mezdra (loan)	2015–16	B Group	3	0	—		—		—		3	0
CSKA Sofia II	2016–17	Second League	2	0	—		—		—		2	0
Tsarsko Selo (loan)	2016–17	Second League	17	0	1	0	—		—		18	0
Tsarsko Selo (loan)	2017–18	Second League	7	1	2	0	—		1	0	10	1
Tsarsko Selo (loan)	2018–19	Second League	2	0	—		—		—		2	0
Tsarsko Selo (loan)	Total		26	1	3	0	0	0	1	0	30	1
Litex Lovech (loan)	2018–19	Second League	3	0	1	0	—		—		4	0
Tsarsko Selo (loan)	2018–19	Second League	2	0	—		—		—		2	0
Litex Lovech (loan)	2019–20	Second League	16	0	2	0	—		—		18	0
Litex Lovech (loan)	2020–21	Second League	27	0	—		—		—		27	0
Litex Lovech (loan)	2021–22	Second League	30	0	—		—		—		30	0
Litex Lovech (loan)	Total		73	0	2	0	0	0	0	0	75	0
CSKA Sofia	2022–23	First League	3	0	1	0	1	0	—		5	0
Lokomotiv Sofia	2023–24	First League	9	0	2	0	—		—		11	0
Dunav Ruse	2023–24	Second League	9	0	0	0	—		—		9	0
Montana	2024–25	Second League	8	0	0	0	—		—		8	0
Fratria	2024–25	Second League	9	0	0	0	—		—		9	0
Rilski Sportist	2025–26	Third League	0	0	0	0	—		—		0	0
Career total			157	1	9	0	1	0	1	0	168	1
