= Yoan Baurenski =

Bulgarian footballer (born 2001)

Personal information
- Full name: Yoan Hristov Baurenski
- Date of birth: 21 October 2001 (age 25)
- Place of birth: Montana, Bulgaria
- Height: 1.70 m (5 ft 7 in)
- Position: Midfielder

Team information
- Current team: Septemvri Sofia
- Number: 5

Youth career
- Montana Stars
- –2016: Litex Lovech
- 2016–2019: CSKA Sofia

Senior career*
Years	Team	Apps	(Gls)
2019–2023	CSKA Sofia	4	(0)
2020–2021	→ Litex Lovech (loan)	23	(0)
2021–2022	→ Botev Vratsa (loan)	26	(1)
2022	→ CSKA Sofia II	6	(0)
2023	Beroe	11	(0)
2023–2025	Spartak Varna	58	(1)
2025–	Septemvri Sofia	35	(0)

International career
2017	Bulgaria U17	3	(0)
2019	Bulgaria U19	3	(0)
2021–	Bulgaria U21	7	(0)
- * Club domestic league appearances and goals as of 26 May 2026

Yoan Hristov Baurenski (Bulgarian: Йоан Христов Бауренски; born 21 October 2001) is a Bulgarian professional footballer who plays as a midfielder for Septemvri Sofia.

== Career ==
Baurenski started his career in the local Montana Stars Academy, before moving to Litex Lovеch and later in 2016 to CSKA Sofia. On 5 July 2020, he made his professional debut for CSKA in a league match against Ludogorets Razgrad. In 2020 he was loaned to Litex Lovech and in 2021 to Botev Vratsa. In January 2023, Baurenski joined Beroe. On 13 July 2023 he moved to Spartak Varna. In June 2025, Baurenski joined Septemvri Sofia.
