= Jurgen Mattheij =

Dutch footballer (born 1993)

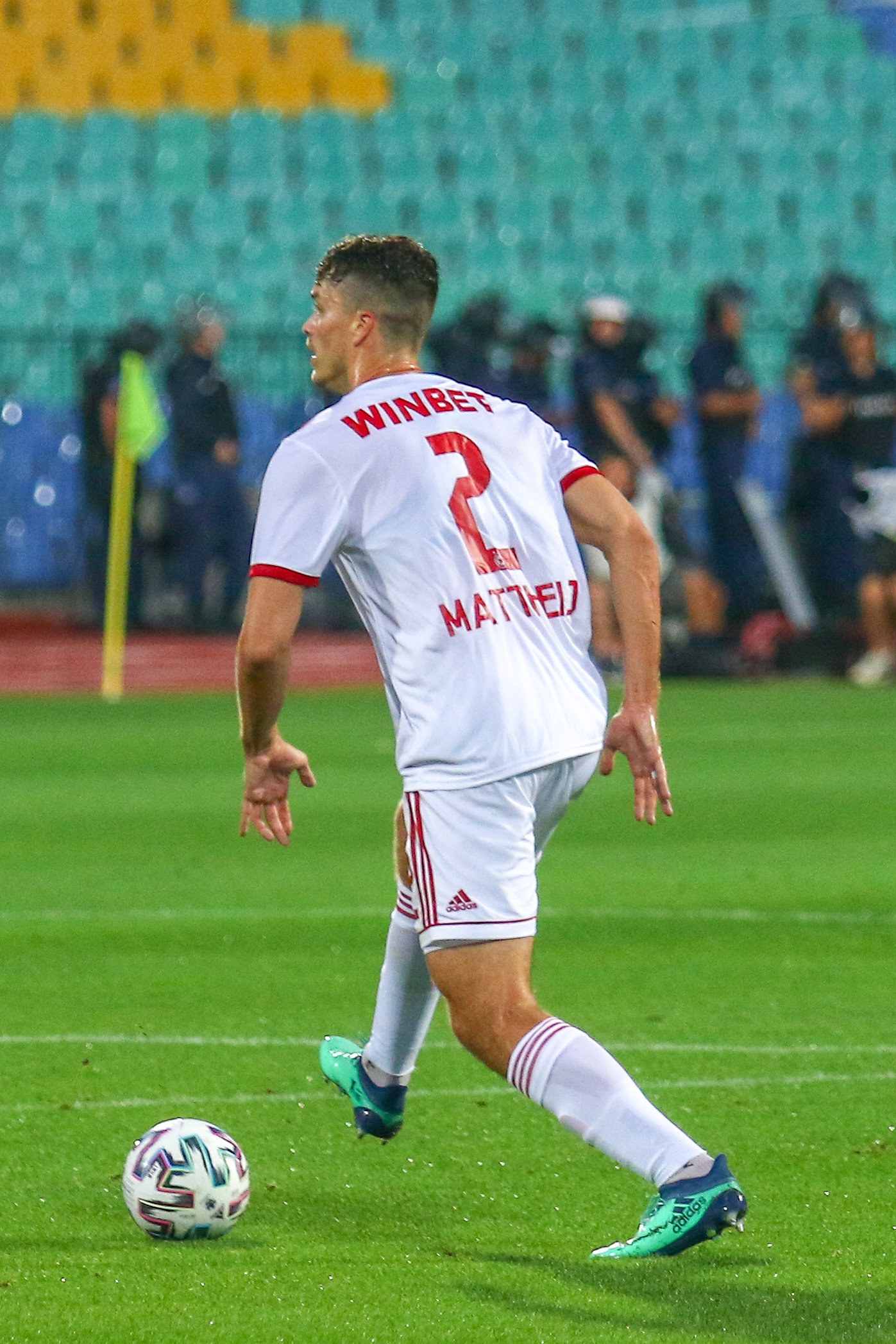
- Mattheij in 2020

Personal information
- Date of birth: 1 April 1993 (age 33)
- Place of birth: Rotterdam, Netherlands
- Height: 1.91 m (6 ft 3 in)
- Position: Centre back

Team information
- Current team: IJsselmeervogels
- Number: 27

Youth career
- Alexandria '66
- Sparta Rotterdam
- Excelsior

Senior career*
Years	Team	Apps	(Gls)
2011–2019	Excelsior	175	(8)
2019–2020	Sparta Rotterdam	26	(2)
2020–2024	CSKA Sofia	79	(9)
2025	Excelsior	1	(0)
2026–	IJsselmeervogels	19	(0)
- * Club domestic league appearances and goals as of 09:40, 25 October 2026 (UTC)

Jurgen Mattheij (born 1 April 1993) is a Dutch professional footballer who plays as a centre-back for Tweede Divisie club IJsselmeervogels.

== Club career ==
Born in Rotterdam, Mattheij began his professional career at Excelsior in 2011. In his eight seasons with the club, he played in 188 games and scored 9 goals. In June 2019, he joined Sparta Rotterdam before moving to CSKA Sofia a year later. Mattheij soon established himself as a key player for "the reds", becoming the team's captain.

He also developed a knack for scoring decisive goals, including a last-minute one in extra time in the second leg against Viktoria Plzeň, held on 26 August 2021, to secure the team's entry into the UEFA Europa Conference League group stage, and the winning goal against Bulgarian champions Ludogorets Razgrad in a First League match that took place on 20 December 2021.

During 2021, he managed a career-high 7 goals in all tournaments. Mattheij's winning strike against CSKA 1948 on 8 November was voted Goal of the Season for 2021. In June 2024, following a period during which he was sidelined due to injury issues, he left the team upon the expiration of his contract.

On 30 December 2024, Mattheij returned to Excelsior, on a contract until the end of the 2024–25 season. He made a single appearance following his return, coming on as a late substitute in a 3–1 away victory against SC Telstar on 21 February 2025. In March 2025, he sustained a season-ending injury, ruling him out for the remainder of the campaign.

After spending six months as a free agent, Mattheij signed with IJsselmeervogels on 29 January 2026, joining the Tweede Divisie side until the end of the season.

== Career statistics ==
As of 21 February 2025

Appearances and goals by club, season and competition
Club	Season	League			Cup		Europe		Other		Total	
Club	Season	Division	Apps	Goals	Apps	Goals	Apps	Goals	Apps	Goals	Apps	Goals
Excelsior	2011–12	Eredivisie	12	1	0	0	–		–		12	1
Excelsior	2012–13	Eerste Divisie	16	0	0	0	–		–		16	0
Excelsior	2013–14	Eerste Divisie	10	1	1	0	–		1	0	12	1
Excelsior	2014–15	Eredivisie	20	0	4	1	–		–		24	1
Excelsior	2015–16	Eredivisie	21	0	2	0	–		–		23	0
Excelsior	2016–17	Eredivisie	31	3	2	0	–		–		33	3
Excelsior	2017–18	Eredivisie	33	0	0	0	–		–		33	0
Excelsior	2018–19	Eredivisie	32	3	1	0	–		1	0	34	3
Excelsior	Total		175	8	11	1	–		2	0	188	9
Sparta Rotterdam	2019–20	Eredivisie	26	2	1	0	–		–		27	2
CSKA Sofia	2020–21	First League	25	3	6	0	9	0	–		40	3
CSKA Sofia	2021–22	First League	22	4	3	0	12	1	1	0	38	5
CSKA Sofia	2022–23	First League	26	1	2	0	5	1	0	0	33	2
CSKA Sofia	2023–24	First League	6	1	3	0	0	0	–		9	1
CSKA Sofia	Total		79	9	14	0	26	2	1	0	120	11
Excelsior	2024–25	Eerste Divisie	1	0	0	0	–		–		1	0
Career total			281	19	26	1	26	2	3	0	336	22

== Honours ==
=== Team ===
CSKA Sofia

- Bulgarian Cup: 2020–21

=== Individual ===
- Best goal in Bulgarian football for 2021
- Best defender in Bulgarian football for 2021
- Best foreign player in Bulgarian football for 2021 (shared with Jordy Caicedo)
- Bulgarian First League Goal of the Week: 2021–22 (Week 14) v. CSKA 1948
