= Matheus Clemente =

Portuguese footballer (born 1998)

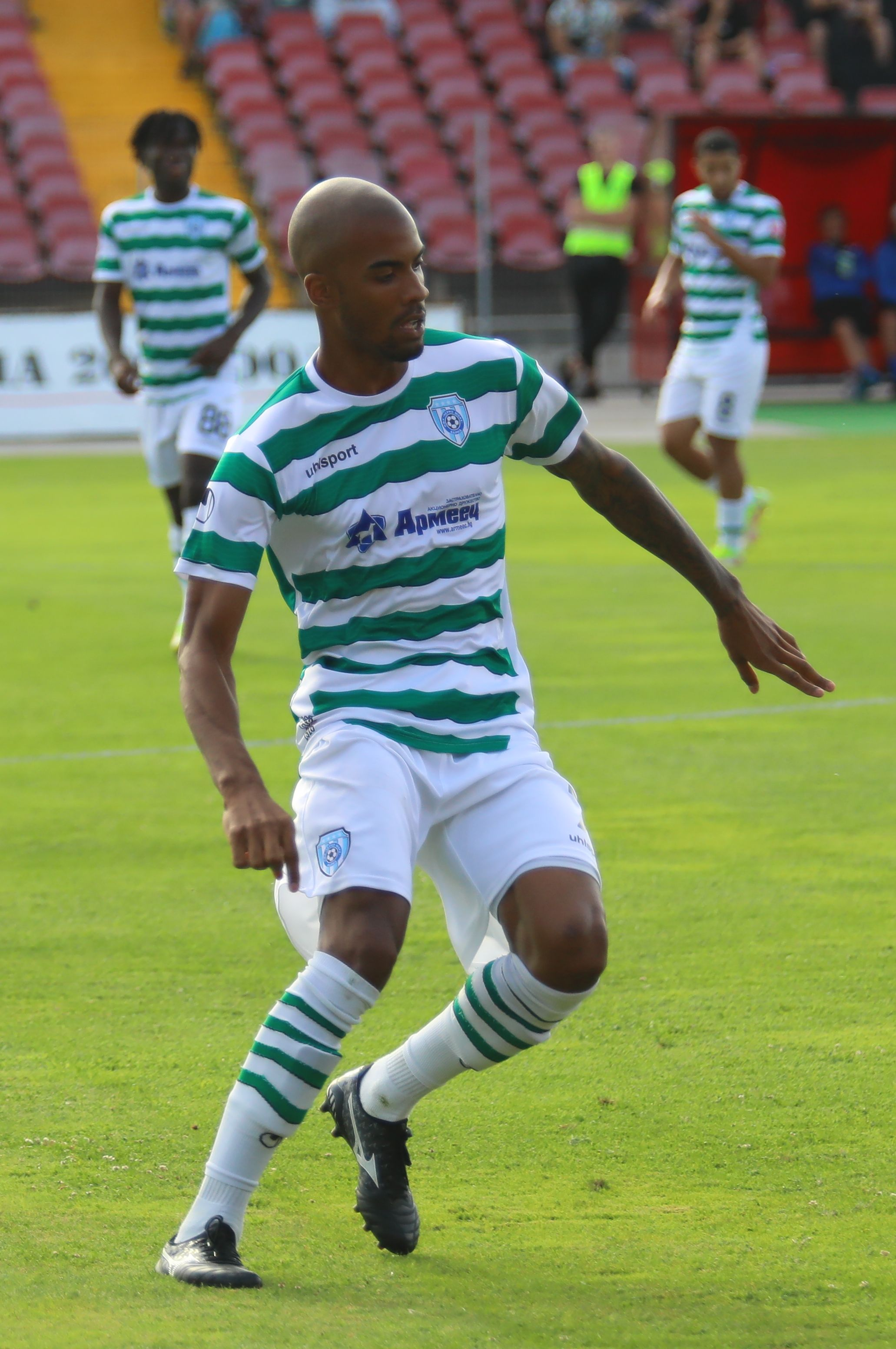

Personal information
- Full name: Matheus dos Santos Clemente
- Date of birth: 10 June 1998 (age 28)
- Place of birth: Brazil
- Height: 1.82 m (6 ft 0 in)
- Position: Midfielder

Team information
- Current team: Akritas Chlorakas
- Number: 7

Youth career
- 2007–2008: Ronfe
- 2008–2010: Póvoa de Lanhoso
- 2010–2015: Benfica
- 2015: Casa Pia
- 2015–2016: Vitória Guimarães
- 2016–2017: Paços de Ferreira

Senior career*
Years	Team	Apps	(Gls)
2017–2018	Paços de Ferreira B	24	(7)
2018–2019	São Martinho	25	(2)
2019–2021	Famalicão	1	(0)
2021	→ Olhanense (loan)	10	(0)
2021–2022	Felgueiras	18	(0)
2022	Cherno More	16	(1)
2023–2023	Akritas Chlorakas	17	(2)
2023–2025	Auda	65	(6)
2026	RFS	0	(0)
2026–	Akritas Chlorakas	4	(0)
- * Club domestic league appearances and goals as of 00:46, 9 November 2026 (UTC)

Matheus dos Santos Clemente (born 10 June 1998) is a Portuguese professional footballer who plays as a midfielder for Cypriot Second Division club Akritas Chlorakas.

== Club career ==
On 28 August 2019, Clemente signed a professional contract with Famalicão. Clemente made his professional debut with Famalicão in a 5-1 league loss to Benfica on 18 September 2020.

On 8 August 2021, he moved to Felgueiras.

== Personal life ==
Clemente's father, Marcão, was also a footballer who played for Famalicão.
