= Stadion Septemvri (Sofia) =

Multi-purpose stadium in Bulgaria

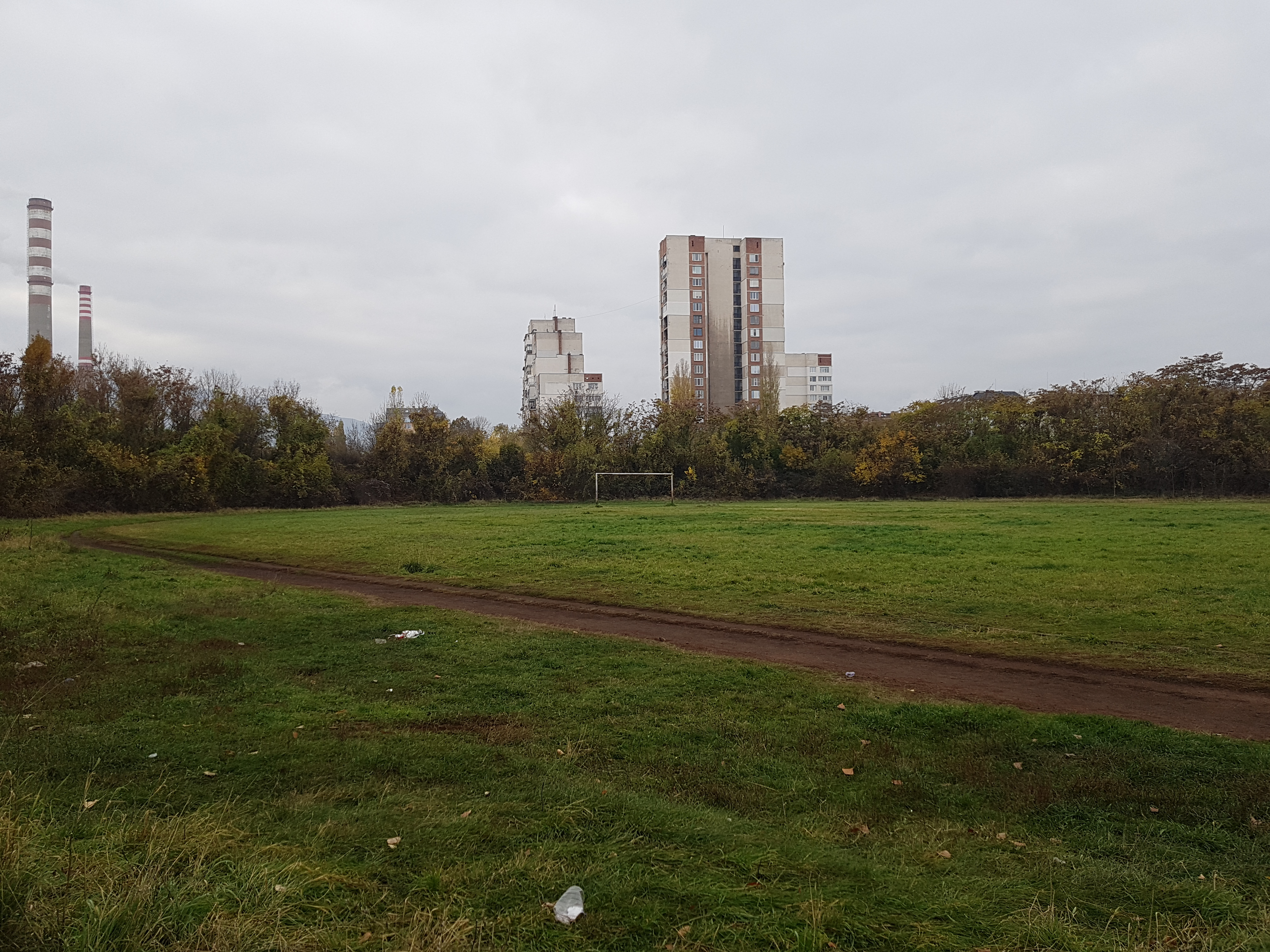
- Interactive map of Stadion Septemvri
- Full name: Septemvri Stadium
- Location: Sofia, Bulgaria
- Coordinates: 42°41′32″N 23°17′16″E
- Owner: DIT Group
- Operator: Septemvri Sofia
- Capacity: 25,000
- Surface: Grass
- Field size: 105 × 68

Construction
- Groundbreaking: 1956
- Built: 1958 (old)
- Opened: 1958 (old)

Tenants
- Old Stadium; Septemvri Sofia (1958–1969; 1988–2006); CSKA Sofia (1970–1988); CSKA Sofia Reserves (1981–1984)

Stadion Septemvri (Bulgarian: Стадион „Септември“, English: 'Septemvri Stadium') is a multi-purpose stadium in Sofia, Bulgaria. It is currently used mostly for football matches.

== History ==
=== Old Septemvri Stadium ===
Septemvri Stadium was opened on 18 March 1958 with a friendly match against PFC Septemvri Sofia and PFC Levski Sofia. The stadium had 25,000 seats.

=== New Septemvri Stadium ===
In 2011, Hristo Stoichkov announced that a new Septemvri Stadium would be built with 15,000 seats and would have the name The Crown of Septemvri. But the project was cancelled in 2013.

After the takeover of Septemvri by DIT Group in 2015, the new owners would fund a new stadium. In early 2017 it was announced that the new Septemvri Stadium building would start in summer 2017, if the team get the promotion for the Bulgarian First League. In 2018, the project with 4,500 seats was run, expecting to be approved before the end of 2018. As of 2023, no construction was started, while Septemvri Sofia are playing on Stadion Dragalevtsi or Vasil Levski National Stadium.
