= Krasimir Miloshev =

Bulgarian footballer (born 2000)

Personal information
- Full name: Krasimir Krasimirov Miloshev
- Date of birth: 5 April 2000 (age 26)
- Place of birth: Sofia, Bulgaria
- Height: 1.74 m (5 ft 9 in)
- Position: Defensive midfielder

Team information
- Current team: Lokomotiv Sofia
- Number: 26

Youth career
- Obelya Sofia
- 2014–2018: Lokomotiv Sofia

Senior career*
Years	Team	Apps	(Gls)
2017–2024	Lokomotiv Sofia	158	(5)
2024–2025	Al-Markhiya	8	(0)
2025–	Lokomotiv Sofia	11	(0)

International career^{‡}
2018	Bulgaria U19	3	(0)
- * Club domestic league appearances and goals as of 14:14, 30 May 2026 (UTC) ‡ National team caps and goals as of 08:00, 3 October 2023 (UTC)

Krasimir Krasimirov Miloshev (Bulgarian: Красимир Милошев; born 5 April 2000) is a Bulgarian professional footballer who plays as a midfielder for Lokomotiv Sofia.

== Club career ==
At age of 7, Miloshev started playing handball. He kept playing handball until 2013, but switched to football since he saw bigger prospect. He started his career as a goalkeeper in Obelya Sofia and then moved to Lokomotiv Sofia where he switched to a field position. He was promoted to the first team in 2016 when he was 16 years old. He became team captain in 2020–21 season, when the team won a promotion to the First league. In July 2023 he was awarded by fans of Lokomotiv as the best player of the season.

== International career ==
Miloshev received his first call-up for Bulgaria U21 on 24 May 2022 for UEFA Euro 2023 qualification matches against Switzerland on 4 June 2022 and Gibraltar on 11 June 2022.

== Career statistics ==
=== Club ===
As of 3 October 2023

Appearances and goals by club, season and competition
Club	Season	League			Bulgarian Cup		Continental		Other (Note: Includes Bulgarian Supercup)		Total	
Club	Season	Division	Apps	Goals	Apps	Goals	Apps	Goals	Apps	Goals	Apps	Goals
Lokomotiv Sofia	2016–17	Second League	3	0	0	0	–		–		3	0
Lokomotiv Sofia	2017–18	Second League	1	0	1	0	–		–		2	0
Lokomotiv Sofia	2018–19	Second League	26	0	1	0	–		–		27	0
Lokomotiv Sofia	2019–20	Second League	11	0	0	0	–		–		11	0
Lokomotiv Sofia	2020–21	Second League	25	2	0	0	–		–		25	2
Lokomotiv Sofia	2021–22	First League	27	0	2	0	–		–		29	0
Lokomotiv Sofia	2022–23	First League	33	3	5	1	–		–		38	4
Lokomotiv Sofia	2023–24	First League	12	0	0	0	–		–		12	0
Lokomotiv Sofia	Total		138	5	9	1	0	0	0	0	147	6
Career total			138	5	9	1	0	0	0	0	147	6
