= Ivan Skerlev =

Bulgarian footballer

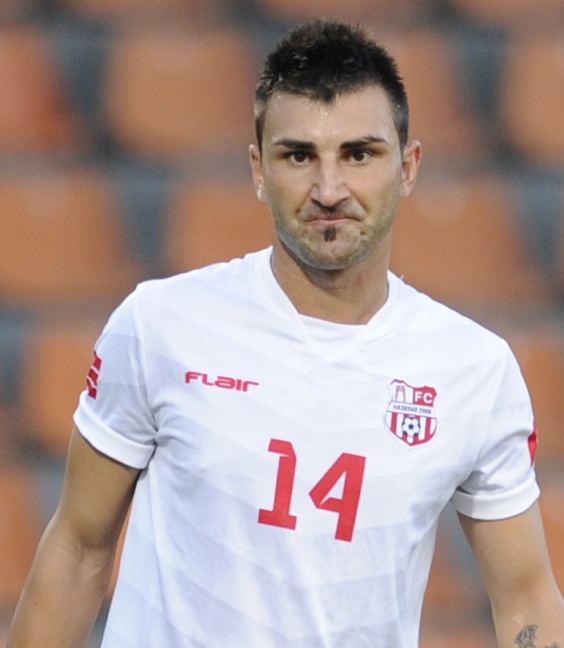

Personal information
- Full name: Ivan Petrov Skerlev
- Date of birth: 28 January 1986 (age 40)
- Place of birth: Haskovo, Bulgaria
- Height: 1.80 m (5 ft 11 in)
- Position: Right-back

Youth career
- Pirin Blagoevgrad

Senior career*
Years	Team	Apps	(Gls)
2005–2009	Litex Lovech	2	(0)
2006–2007	→ Dunav Ruse (loan)	25	(2)
2008	→ Lyubimets 2007 (loan)	9	(0)
2009	Svilengrad	4	(0)
2010	Brestnik 1948	13	(0)
2011	Vidima-Rakovski	5	(0)
2011	Hebros Harmanli	14	(1)
2012	Dimitrovgrad	12	(0)
2012–2015	Haskovo	81	(2)
2015	Lokomotiv Mezdra	15	(0)
2016–2020	Etar Veliko Tarnovo	85	(4)
- * Club domestic league appearances and goals

Ivan Skerlev (Bulgarian: Иван Скерлев; born 28 January 1986) is a Bulgarian former professional footballer who played as a right-back.
