= 2021–22 PFC CSKA Sofia season =

CSKA Sofia
2021–22 season
- Controlling owner: Grisha Ganchev
- Manager: Lyuboslav Penev (until 26 July 2021); Stoycho Mladenov (until 13 April 2022); Alan Pardew (since 15 April 2022)
- Parva Liga: Second place
- Bulgarian Cup: Runners-up
- Bulgarian Supercup: Runners-up
- UEFA Europa Conference League: Group stage
- Top goalscorer: League: Jordy Caicedo (16); All: Jordy Caicedo (22)
Home colours	Away colours	Third colours

The 2021–22 season is CSKA Sofia's 73rd season in the Parva Liga (the top flight of Bulgarian football) and their sixth consecutive participation after their administrative relegation in the third division due to mounting financial troubles. In addition to the domestic league, CSKA Sofia participates in this season's edition of the Bulgarian Cup and UEFA Europa Conference League. This article shows player statistics and all matches (official and friendly) that the club will play during the 2021–22 season.

== Players ==
=== Squad information ===
N	Pos.	Nat.	Name	Age	Since	App	Goals	Ends	Transfer fee	Notes
1	GK	(Brazil)	Gustavo Busatto	30	2019	109	0	2022	Free	
2	DF	(Netherlands)	Jurgen Mattheij	28	2020	78	8	2024	Free	
3	DF	(Brazil)	Geferson	27	2017 (Winter)	131	2	2024	Undisclosed	
4	DF	(Netherlands)	Menno Koch	26	2020 (Winter)	35	3	2024	€500,000	
5	MF	(Argentina)	Federico Varela	24	2020 (Winter)	34	0	2023	Free	
6	DF	(Bulgaria)	Hristiyan Petrov	19	2020	5	0	2024	Youth system	
7	MF	(France)	Yohan Baï	24	2021	34	3	2023	Free	
8	MF	(Republic of Ireland)	Graham Carey	32	2019	106	11	2022	Free	
9	FW	(Ecuador)	Jordy Caicedo	23	2020 (Winter)	65	32	2025	Free	
10	MF	(Bulgaria)	Georgi Yomov	23	2020	86	15	2024	€300,000	
14	MF	(Bulgaria)	Kaloyan Krastev	22	2021	25	0	2024	€300,000	
15	DF	(France)	Thibaut Vion	27	2020	54	2	2023	Free	
16	DF	(Bulgaria)	Asen Donchev	19	2020	14	0	2024	Youth system	
17	FW	(Ghana)	Bismark Charles	20	2020 (Winter)	31	5	2024	Free	
18	DF	(Republic of the Congo)	Bradley Mazikou	30	2019	110	4	2022	Free	
19	DF	(Bulgaria)	Ivan Turitsov	21	2018	111	1	2023	Youth system	
20	MF	(France)	Junior Nzila	20	2021	5	0	2022	Loan	
21	MF	(Central African Republic)	Amos Youga	28	2020	77	3	2023	Free	
23	FW	(Bulgaria)	Ahmed Ahmedov	26	2019 (Winter)	42	9	2023	Free	
24	MF	(Croatia)	Karlo Muhar	25	2021	36	2	2022	Loan	
25	GK	(Bulgaria)	Dimitar Evtimov	27	2020	19	0	2022	Free	
26	DF	(Bulgaria)	Rosen Bozhinov	16	2021	2	0	2025	Youth system	
27	FW	(Brazil)	Maurício Garcez	24	2021 (Winter)	13	1	2023	Loan	
28	FW	(Colombia)	Brayan Moreno	22	2021 (Winter)	3	0	2025	Free	
29	DF	(Finland)	Thomas Lam	27	2021	34	0	2023	Free	
30	MF	(Suriname)	Yanic Wildschut	29	2021	45	1	2023	Free	
—	MF	(Luxembourg)	Enes Mahmutovic	24	2021 (Winter)	0	0	2024	Free	

- Last updated: 22 May 2022
- Source: Players transfer and Wikipedia players' articles
- Ordered by squad number.

== Transfers ==
=== In ===
No.	Pos.	Nat.	Name	Age	EU	Moving from	Type	Transfer window	Ends	Transfer fee	Source
7	MF	(France)	Yohan Baï	24	EU	(France) Canet Roussillon	Transfer	Summer	2023	Free	cska.bg
23	FW	(Bulgaria)	Ahmed Ahmedov	26	EU	(Azerbaijan) Neftçi	Loan return	Summer		Free	topsport.bg
—	GK	(Bulgaria)	Iliya Shalamanov	18	EU	(Bulgaria) Litex Lovech	Loan return	Summer		Free	
—	GK	(Bulgaria)	Ivaylo Iliev	18	EU	(Bulgaria) Litex Lovech	Loan return	Summer		Free	
29	DF	(Bulgaria)	Hristiyan Petrov	18	EU	(Bulgaria) Litex Lovech	Loan return	Summer		Free	
—	MF	(Bulgaria)	Hristo Radkov	18	EU	(Bulgaria) Litex Lovech	Loan return	Summer		Free	
6	MF	(France)	Junior Nzila	20	EU	(Italy) Chiasso	Loan	Summer	2022	€90,000	cska.bg
11	FW	(Bosnia and Herzegovina)	Hamza Čataković	24	Non-EU	(Slovakia) Trenčín	Transfer	Summer	2023	Free	cska.bg
30	MF	(Suriname)	Yanic Wildschut	29	EU	(Israel) Maccabi Haifa	Transfer	Summer	2023	Free	cska.bg
26	DF	(Bulgaria)	Valentin Antov	20	EU	(Italy) Bologna	Loan return	Summer		Free	cska.bg
29	DF	(Finland)	Thomas Lam	27	EU	(Netherlands) PEC Zwolle	Transfer	Summer	2023	Free	cska.bg
24	MF	(Croatia)	Karlo Muhar	27	EU	(Poland) Lech Poznań	Loan	Summer	2022	Free	cska.bg
14	FW	(Bulgaria)	Kaloyan Krastev	22	EU	(Bulgaria) Slavia Sofia	Transfer	Summer	2024	€300,000	cska.bg
20	DF	(Estonia)	Karol Mets	28	EU	(Saudi Arabia) Al-Ettifaq	Transfer	Summer	2022	Free	cska.bg
—	FW	(Bulgaria)	Ivan Mitrev	22	EU	(Bulgaria) Botev Vratsa	Loan return	Winter		Free	trug.bg
27	FW	(Brazil)	Maurício Garcez	24	Non-EU	(Brazil) Brusque	Loan	Winter	2023	€100,000	cska.bg
28	FW	(Colombia)	Brayan Moreno	22	Non-EU	(Colombia) Atlético Huila	Transfer	Winter	2024	Free	cska.bg
6	DF	(Bulgaria)	Hristiyan Petrov	19	EU	(Bulgaria) Litex Lovech	Loan return	Winter		Free	cska.bg
—	DF	(Luxembourg)	Enes Mahmutovic	24	EU	(Ukraine) Lviv	Transfer	Winter		Free	cska.bg

=== Out ===
No.	Pos.	Nat.	Name	Age	EU	Moving to	Type	Transfer window	Transfer fee	Source
9	MF	(Venezuela)	Adalberto Peñaranda	24	EU	(England) Watford	Loan return	Summer	Free	
14	MF	(Guinea)	Jules Keita	22	Non-EU	(France) Lens	Loan return	Summer	Free	dsport.bg
24	FW	(England)	Jerome Sinclair	24	EU	(England) Watford	Loan return	Summer	Free	
11	DF	(Bulgaria)	Petar Zanev	35	EU	(Bulgaria) Pirin	End of contract	Summer	Free	cska.bg
7	MF	(Brazil)	Henrique	27	EU	(Portugal) Marítimo	End of contract	Summer	Free	dsport.bg
22	FW	(The Gambia)	Ali Sowe	26	Non-EU	(Russia) Rostov	Transfer	Summer	€3,000,000	dsport.bg
—	MF	(Bulgaria)	Kristiyan Grozdanov	16	EU	(Bulgaria) CSKA 1948	Free transfer	Summer	Free	
—	DF	(Bulgaria)	Emil Tsenov	19	EU	(Bulgaria) Minyor Pernik	Free transfer	Summer	Free	
—	DF	(Bulgaria)	Yoan Baurenski	19	EU	(Bulgaria) Botev Vratsa	Loan	Summer	Free	dsport.bg
27	FW	(Bulgaria)	Martin Smolenski	18	EU	(Bulgaria) Minyor Pernik	Loan	Summer	Free	dsport.bg
—	FW	(Bulgaria)	Ivan Mitrev	22	EU	(Bulgaria) Botev Vratsa	Loan	Summer	Free	cska.bg
29	DF	(Bulgaria)	Aleksandar Buchkov	17	EU	(Bulgaria) Litex Lovech	Loan	Summer	Free	cska.bg
—	FW	(Bulgaria)	Mark-Emilio Papazov	17	EU	(Bulgaria) Litex Lovech	Loan	Summer	Free	cska.bg
—	DF	(Bulgaria)	Kristiyan Atanasov	18	EU	(Bulgaria) Litex Lovech	Free transfer	Summer	Free	cska.bg
—	DF	(Bulgaria)	Kaloyan Stoilov	19	EU	(Bulgaria) Litex Lovech	Free transfer	Summer	Free	cska.bg
—	GK	(Bulgaria)	Iliya Shalamanov-Trenkov	18	EU	(Bulgaria) Litex Lovech	Loan	Summer	Free	
—	FW	(Bulgaria)	Daniel Ivanov	19	EU	(Bulgaria) Neftochimic Burgas	Loan	Summer	Free	
20	MF	(Portugal)	Tiago Rodrigues	29	EU	(Saudi Arabia) Al-Hazem	Transfer	Summer	€1,000,000	dsport.bg
26	DF	(Bulgaria)	Valentin Antov	20	EU	(Italy) Monza	Transfer	Summer	€3,500,000	cska.bg
14	MF	(Bulgaria)	Mitko Mitkov	21	EU	(Bulgaria) Litex Lovech	Loan	Summer	Free	topsport.bg
20	DF	(Bulgaria)	Hristiyan Petrov	19	EU	(Bulgaria) Litex Lovech	Loan	Summer	Free	dsport.bg
22	FW	(Bulgaria)	Radoslav Zhivkov	22	EU	(Bulgaria) Litex Lovech	Loan	Summer	Free	dsport.bg
20	DF	(Estonia)	Karol Mets	28	EU	(Switzerland) FC Zürich	Transfer	Winter	€200,000	cska.bg
—	FW	(Bulgaria)	Ivan Mitrev	22	EU	(Bulgaria) Litex Lovech	Loan	Winter	Free	topsport.bg
28	DF	(Bulgaria)	Plamen Galabov	26	EU	(Israel) Maccabi Netanya	Transfer	Winter	€100,000	dsport.bg
11	FW	(Bosnia and Herzegovina)	Hamza Čataković	25	Non-EU	(Bosnia and Herzegovina) FK Sarajevo	Released	Winter	Free	cska.bg
—	FW	(Bulgaria)	Daniel Ivanov	19	EU	(Bulgaria) Pirin	Free transfer	Winter	Free	topsport.bg

== Pre-season and friendlies ==
Win Draw Loss Fixtures

=== Pre-season ===
19 June 2021 Friendly	CSKA	2−0	Litex	Pancharevo, Bulgaria
11:00 UTC+3	Bismark 11'; Zhivkov 80'	Report	Kapitanov (penalty missed) 21'	Stadium: Sporten kompleks Pancharevo; Attendance: 0

26 June 2021 Friendly	CSKA (Bulgaria)	1−0	(Austria) Wacker Innsbruck	Fulpmes, Austria
19:00 UTC+3	Mattheij 56'	Report		Stadium: Sportplatz Fulpmes; Attendance: 0

30 June 2021 Friendly	CSKA (Bulgaria)	1−2	(Greece) Olympiacos	Schwaz, Austria
19:00 UTC+3	Ahmedov 58'	Report	Kouka 63'; Čumić 80'	Stadium: Silberstadt Arena; Attendance: 0

4 July 2021 Friendly	CSKA (Bulgaria)	0−1	(Germany) Werder Bremen	Zell am Ziller, Austria
17:00 UTC+3		Report	J. Eggestein 83'	Stadium: Parkstadion

7 July 2021 Friendly	CSKA (Bulgaria)	0−1	(Azerbaijan) Qarabağ	Fulpmes, Austria
19:00 UTC+3			Gurbanli 70'	Stadium: Sportplatz Fulpmes

10 July 2021 Friendly	CSKA	4−0	Botev Vratsa	Sofia, Bulgaria
19:30 UTC+3	Vieira 3' (o.g.); Varela 37', 45', 71'	Report		Stadium: Stadion Balgarska Armia

=== On-season (autumn) ===
6 September 2021 Friendly	CSKA	4−1	Bansko	Banya, Bulgaria
15:00 UTC+3	Caicedo 11'; Ahmedov 52'; Čataković 55'; Varela 66'	Report	Malamov 44'	Stadium: Sporten kompleks Evima

11 October 2021 Friendly	CSKA	6−1	Bansko	Banya, Bulgaria
15:00 UTC+3	Wildschut 24'; Ahmedov 29'; Carey 31'; Nzila 55'; Varela 61'; Zhabov 84'	Report	Baltov 26'	Stadium: Sporten kompleks Evima

16 November 2021 Friendly	CSKA	4−1	Litex	Pancharevo, Bulgaria
15:00 UTC+2	Bismark 20', 23'; Muhar 43' (pen.); Wildschut 69'	Report	Kapitanov 25' (pen.)	Stadium: Sporten kompleks Pancharevo

=== Mid-season ===
21 January 2022 Friendly	CSKA (Bulgaria)	1−1	(Poland) Stal Mielec	Alanya, Turkey
16:00 UTC+2	Krastev 27'; Turitsov (red card) 65'; Vion (red card) 73'	Report	Hinokio 55'	Stadium: Gold City Spor Kompleksi

26 January 2022 Friendly	CSKA (Bulgaria)	cancelled	(Austria) Hartberg	Belek, Turkey
9:30 UTC+2				Stadium: Arcadia Center
Note: Initially postponed due to severe weather conditions (snowfall), then cancelled

28 January 2022 Friendly	CSKA (Bulgaria)	3−1	(Russia) Dynamo Moscow	Belek, Turkey
17:00 UTC+2	Turitsov 25' (pen.); Bismark 45'; Garcez 86'	Report	Ordets 60'	Stadium: Regnum Kompleksi

31 January 2022 Friendly	CSKA (Bulgaria)	5−1	(Kazakhstan) Shakhter Karagandy	Belek, Turkey
11:30 UTC+2	Youga 13', 45+1'; Yomov 24', 32'; Turitsov 62' (pen.)	Report	Kovtalyuk 5'	Stadium: Titanic Hotel Kompleksi

31 January 2022 Friendly	CSKA (Bulgaria)	0−4	(North Macedonia) Akademija Pandev	Belek, Turkey
17:30 UTC+2		Report	Pandev 34'; Bakar 53'; Dimoski 69'; Ivanovski 72'	Stadium: Susesi Football Center

6 February 2022 Friendly	CSKA	2−0	Litex	Pancharevo, Bulgaria
15:00 UTC+2	Carey 21'; Chorbadzhiyski 51'	Report		Stadium: Sporten kompleks Pancharevo; Attendance: 0

7 February 2022 Friendly	CSKA	3−0	Tsarsko Selo	Sofia, Bulgaria
15:00 UTC+2	Mattheij 24'; Caicedo 83', 90'	Report	Zebli (red card) 66'; Lucarelli (yellow card) (yellow-red card) 72'	Stadium: Stadion Balgarska Armia

=== On-season (spring) ===
27 March 2022 Friendly	CSKA	3−1	Sportist	Pancharevo, Bulgaria
16:30 UTC+3	Donchev 15'; Muhar 57' (pen.); Bismark 72'	Report	Feradov 45+1'	Stadium: Sporten kompleks Pancharevo; Attendance: 100

== Competitions ==
=== Overview ===
Competition	First match	Last match	Starting round	Final position	Record							
Competition	First match	Last match	Starting round	Final position	Pld	W	D	L	GF	GA	GD	Win %
Parva Liga	25 July 2021	22 May 2022	Matchday 1	Runner-up	31	16	10	5	42	31	+11	51.61
Bulgarian Cup	22 September 2021	15 May 2022	First round	Runner-up	6	4	0	2	9	3	+6	66.67
Bulgarian Supercup	17 July 2021		Final	Runner-up	1	0	0	1	0	4	−4	0.00
UEFA Europa Conference League	22 July 2021	9 December 2021	Second qualifying round	Group Stage	12	2	4	6	11	18	−7	16.67
Total					50	22	14	14	62	56	+6	44.00

Last updated: 22 May 2022
Source: Competitions

=== Parva Liga ===
==== Regular stage ====
===== League table =====
Pos	Team	Pld	W	D	L	GF	GA	GD	Pts	Qualification
1	Ludogorets Razgrad	26	21	1	4	64	23	+41	64	Qualification for the Championship group
2	CSKA Sofia	26	15	7	4	39	25	+14	52	Qualification for the Championship group
3	Botev Plovdiv	26	13	7	6	34	28	+6	46	Qualification for the Championship group
4	Cherno More	26	12	9	5	35	18	+17	45	Qualification for the Championship group
5	Levski Sofia	26	12	6	8	33	25	+8	42	Qualification for the Championship group

Source: soccerway, Bulgarian Football
Rules for classification: 1) Points; 2) Head-to-head points; 3) Head-to-head goal difference; 4) Head-to-head goals scored; 5) Head-to-head away goals scored (only if two teams); 6) Goal difference; 7) Goals scored; 8) Fairplay ranking; 9) Draw.

===== Results summary =====
Overall								Home						Away					
Pld	W	D	L	GF	GA	GD	Pts	W	D	L	GF	GA	GD	W	D	L	GF	GA	GD
26	15	7	4	39	25	+14	52	10	2	1	21	8	+13	5	5	3	18	17	+1

Last updated: 2 April 2022.
Source: See results

===== Results by round =====
Round	1	2	3	4	5	6	7	8	9	10	11	12	13	14	15	16	17	18	19	20	21	22	23	24	25	26
Ground	A	A	H	A	H	A	H	A	H	A	H	A	H	H	H	A	H	A	H	A	H	A	H	A	H	A
Result	W	D	W	D	W	W	D	W	W	W	W	D	L	W	W	L	W	D	W	W	W	D	D	L	W	L
Position/	1	3	2	3	3	2	2	2	2	2	2	2	2	2	2	2	2	2	2	2	2	2	2	2	2	2

Updated to match(es) played on 9 April 2022. Source: See Results
A = Away; H = Home; W = Win; D = Draw; L = Loss

===== Results =====
25 July 2021 1	CSKA 1948	2−4	CSKA	Sofia
18:45 UTC+3	Haydarov (yellow card) 45'; Chochev 47', 58' (pen.); Yoskov (yellow card) 63'; Marin (yellow card) 76' (yellow-red card) 84'; Pirgov (yellow card) 81'	Report	Baï 29'; Penev (yellow card) 34' (yellow-red card) 87'; Zhivkov (yellow card) 57'; Youga 72', (yellow card) 90+3'; Mattheij 85' (pen.); Čataković (yellow card) 87'; Caicedo 90+4'	Stadium: Natsionalen stadion Vasil Levski; Attendance: 300; Referee: Valentin Zhelezov (Burgas); Man of the Match: Jurgen Mattheij

22 August 2021 5	CSKA	1−0	Pirin	Sofia
21:00 UTC+3	Donchev (yellow card) 24'; Caicedo 39', (penalty missed) 52'; Mladenov (yellow card) 45'; Youga (yellow card) 45'; Wildschut (yellow card) 56'; Mattheij (yellow card) 83'; Antov (yellow card) 85'; Charles (yellow card) 90+3'	Report	Dyakov (yellow card) 30'; Manolev (yellow card) 35' (yellow-red card) 42'; Feeney (yellow card) 45'	Stadium: Stadion Balgarska Armia; Attendance: 1,400; Referee: Dimitar Dimitrov (Sofia); Man of the Match: Georgi Yomov

29 August 2021 6	Cherno More	0−1	CSKA	Varna
18:45 UTC+3	Henrique (yellow card) 26'; Gomes (yellow card) 69' (yellow-red card) 73'; Álvarez (yellow card) 89'	Report	Caicedo 61'; Mazikou (yellow card) 67'; Youga (yellow card) 86'; Turitsov (yellow card) 90+2'	Stadium: Stadion Ticha; Attendance: 6,300; Referee: Georgi Dimitrov (Sofia); Man of the Match: Dimitar Evtimov

11 September 2021 7	CSKA	1−1	Slavia	Sofia
20:45 UTC+3	Caicedo 62'; Carey (penalty missed) 76'	Report	Nguena (yellow card) 28' (yellow-red card) 55'; Viyachki (yellow card) 75'; Makrillos (yellow card) 80'; Hristov (yellow card) 86'; Atanasov 90+1'; Vutsov (yellow card) 90+5'	Stadium: Stadion Balgarska Armia; Attendance: 3,300; Referee: Georgi Kabakov (Plovdiv); Man of the Match: Svetoslav Vutsov

19 September 2021 8	Botev Vratsa	2−4	CSKA	Vratsa
18:15 UTC+3	Babunski 7', (yellow card) 68'; Marinov 73'; Milanov (yellow card) 87'; A. Georgiev (yellow card) 90+1'	Report	Yomov 16', 81'; Mazikou 39'; Caicedo (yellow card) 46'; Baï 50'; Mets (yellow card) 60'; Lam (yellow card) 61'	Stadium: Stadion Hristo Botev; Attendance: 4,500; Referee: Stanimir Trenchev (Sofia); Man of the Match: Georgi Yomov

26 September 2021 9	CSKA	2−1	Levski	Sofia
16:30 UTC+3	Carey 44'; Muhar (yellow card) 55'; Caicedo 65', (yellow card) 67'; Turitsov (yellow card) 84'	Report	Milanov 28'; R. Tsonev (yellow card) 72'	Stadium: Natsionalen stadion Vasil Levski; Attendance: 14,000; Referee: Volen Chinkov (Sofia); Man of the Match: Graham Carey

3 October 2021 10	Tsarsko Selo	1−2	CSKA	Sofia
17:45 UTC+3	Dias 72'; Aleksandrov (yellow card) 90+2'	Report	Turitsov (yellow card) 40'; Geferson (yellow card) 48' (yellow-red card) 50'; Youga 55'; Muhar 90+3'	Stadium: Arena Tsarsko Selo; Attendance: 150; Referee: Nikola Popov (Sofia); Man of the Match: Karlo Muhar

17 October 2021 11	CSKA	3−2	Botev Plovdiv	Sofia
19:15 UTC+3	Caicedo 42', 73'; Yomov 72'	Report	Konate (yellow card) 16'; Nedelev 78' (pen.); Tonev 84'; Rabeï (yellow card) 86'	Stadium: Stadion Balgarska Armia; Attendance: 0 Referee: Georgi Davidov (Veliko Tarnovo); Man of the Match: Georgi Yomov
Note: On 12 October 2021 the Regional Health Inspectorate of Sofia City announced that the stadiums are not allowed to host spectators due to a recent spike of COVID-19-related infections.

24 October 2021 12	Beroe	0−0	CSKA	Stara Zagora
19:00 UTC+3	Stefanov (yellow card) 27'; Furtado (yellow card) 31'; Ali (yellow card) 82'	Report	Mattheij (yellow card) 46'	Stadium: Stadion Beroe; Attendance: 500; Referee: Georgi Kabakov (Plovdiv); Man of the Match: Gustavo Busatto

31 October 2021 13	CSKA	1−3	Lokomotiv Plovdiv	Sofia
16:30 UTC+2	Mattheij (yellow card) 58'; Geferson (yellow card) 75'; Ahmedov (yellow card) 80'; Baï 84'	Report	Minchev 48', 55', 66'; Yanchev (yellow card) 61'; Gomis (yellow card) 77'; Angelov (yellow card) 90+4'	Stadium: Stadion Balgarska Armia; Attendance: 2,000; Referee: Georgi Ginchev (Veliko Tarnovo); Man of the Match: Georgi Minchev

8 November 2021 14	CSKA	1−0	CSKA 1948	Sofia
17:30 UTC+2	Mattheij 30'; Youga (yellow card) 45'; Turitsov (yellow card) 53'	Report	G. Angelov (yellow card) 57'; Pirgov (yellow card) 58'; Martinov (yellow card) 69'	Stadium: Stadion Balgarska Armia; Attendance: 0 Referee: Valentin Zhelezov (Burgas); Man of the Match: Jurgen Mattheij
Note: The game was played without spectators as CSKA was serving a two-game ban due to the disturbances during their home game against Lokomotiv Plovdiv.

20 November 2021 15	CSKA	2−1	Arda	Sofia
17:45 UTC+2	Geferson (yellow card) 40'; Caicedo 54'; Mattheij (yellow card) 56'; Mazikou (yellow card) 57', (goal) 79'; Busatto (yellow card) 90'; Mets (yellow card) 90+3'	Report	Zhelev 2'; Karadzhov (yellow card) 68'; Krumov (yellow card) 75'; Yurukov (yellow card) 90+4'	Stadium: Stadion Balgarska Armia; Attendance: 0 Referee: Nikola Popov (Sofia); Man of the Match: Bradley Mazikou
Note: The game was played without spectators as CSKA was serving a two-game ban due to the disturbances during their home game against Lokomotiv Plovdiv.

29 November 2021 16	Ludogorets	2−0	CSKA	Razgrad
17:15 UTC+2	Gonçalves (yellow card) 28'; Despodov (yellow card) 43'; Sotiriou 78' (pen.); Cicinho (yellow card) 85'; Show (yellow card) 87'; Tchibota 90+1', (yellow card) 90+2'	Report	Mattheij (yellow card) 22'; Carey (yellow card) 63'; Lam (yellow card) 64'	Stadium: Huvepharma Arena; Attendance: 1,600; Referee: Georgi Kabakov (Plovdiv); Man of the Match: Mavis Tchibota

2 December 2021 17	CSKA	2−0	Lokomotiv Sofia	Sofia
17:30 UTC+2	Caicedo 46'; Carey (yellow card) 54'; Yomov 90+2'; Vion (yellow card) 90+4'	Report	Rocha (yellow card) 40'; Ivanov (yellow card) 85'; Orachev (yellow card) 90+1'; Katsikas (yellow card) 90+4'	Stadium: Stadion Balgarska Armia; Attendance: 750; Referee: Stanimir Trenchev (Sofia); Man of the Match: Jordy Caicedo

5 December 2021 18	Pirin	1−1	CSKA	Blagoevgrad
16:45 UTC+2	Karachanakov (yellow card) 51'; Manolev (yellow card) 74', (goal) 90+2'; Bodurov (yellow card) 86'	Report	Mets (yellow card) 3'; Mazikou (yellow card) 68'; Muhar 70'	Stadium: Stadion Hristo Botev; Attendance: 2,500; Referee: Volen Chinkov (Sofia); Man of the Match: Stanislav Manolev

12 December 2021 19	CSKA	2−0	Cherno More	Sofia
14:15 UTC+2	Dichev 20' (o.g.); Muhar (yellow card) 25'; Caicedo 45+1'; Geferson (yellow card) 56'; Turitsov (yellow card) 83'	Report	Serdyuk (yellow card) 23'; Panayotov (yellow card) 71'	Stadium: Stadion Balgarska Armia; Attendance: 850; Referee: Nikola Popov (Sofia); Man of the Match: Yohan Baï

16 December 2021 2	Arda	2−2	CSKA	Kardzhali
16:30 UTC+2	Yurukov (yellow card) 16'; Yordanov 31' (pen.); Kiki (yellow card) 45'; Zehirov (yellow card) 46'; Kokonov 56'; Ivanov (yellow card) 71'; Tilev (yellow card) 80'; Zhelev (yellow card) 90+1'	Report	Geferson (yellow card) 18'; Mattheij (yellow card) 30'; Caicedo 45+1', 90+2'; Muhar (yellow card) 51'; Baï (yellow card) 55'; Bismark (yellow card) 90+5'	Stadium: Arena Arda; Attendance: 1,100; Referee: Ivaylo Stoyanov (Petrich); Man of the Match: Jordy Caicedo
Note: The game has been originally scheduled for 1 August, 21:00 EEST, but has been rescheduled due to the ongoing participation of both clubs in the 2021–22 UEFA Europa Conference League. On 8 November the technical committee of the BFU rescheduled the game for 22 December 2021. A couple of days later, on 10 November the committee did another round of rescheduiling, so this time the game was scheduled for 16 December 2021.

20 December 2021 3	CSKA	1−0	Ludogorets	Sofia
16:30 UTC+2	Lam (yellow card) 32'; Muhar (yellow card) 44' (yellow-red card) 90+1'; Mattheij (yellow card) 46', (goal) 77'; Mladenov (yellow card) 63'; Caicedo (yellow card) 81'; Vion (yellow card) 85'; Yomov (yellow card) 90+8'; Evtimov (yellow card) 90+10'	Report	Pinas (yellow card) 39'; Verdon (yellow card) 43'; Santana (yellow card) 68'; Tchibota (yellow card) 90+8'	Stadium: Stadion Balgarska Armia; Attendance: 5,000; Referee: Valentin Zhelezov (Burgas); Man of the Match: Jurgen Mattheij
Note: The game has been originally scheduled for 8 August, 21:00 EEST, but has been rescheduled due to the ongoing participation of both clubs in the European tournaments. On 8 November the technical committee of the BFU rescheduled the game for 19 December 2021. A couple of days later, on 10 November the committee did another round of rescheduiling, so this time the game was scheduled for 20 December 2021.

13 February 2022 4	Lokomotiv Sofia	1−1	CSKA	Sofia
16:30 UTC+2	Slavchev 15'; Atanasov (yellow card) 33'; Celso (yellow card) 48' (yellow-red card) 86'; Katsikas (yellow card) 57'; Aleksandrov (yellow card) 83'; Lyubenov (yellow card) 90+4'	Report	Yomov 20'; Geferson (yellow card) 76'; Turitsov (yellow card) 90+1'	Stadium: Natsionalen stadion Vasil Levski; Attendance: 2,700; Referee: Georgi Ginchev (Veliko Tarnovo); Man of the Match: Georgi Yomov
Note: The game has been originally scheduled for 15 August, 18:45 EEST, but has been rescheduled due to CSKA's ongoing participation in the 2021–22 UEFA Europa Conference League. On 8 November the technical committee of the BFU rescheduled the game for 16 December 2021. A couple of days later, on 10 November the committee did another round of rescheduiling, so this time the game was to be scheduled for 2022 before the start of the spring matches. On 19 January 2022 the match was scheduled for 13 February 2022.

20 February 2022 20	Slavia	2−3	CSKA	Sofia
17:45 UTC+2	Bakero 55'; Tombak (yellow card) 65' (yellow-red card) 84'; Atanasov (yellow card) 75'; Dost 80'; Soares (yellow card) 82'	Report	Mazikou (yellow card) 15'; Carey (yellow card) 60' (yellow-red card) 90+2'; Caicedo 63'; Koch 72'; Youga 78'; Bismark (yellow card) 90+5'	Stadium: Stadion Aleksandar Shalamanov; Attendance: 1,800; Referee: Dragomir Draganov (Varna); Man of the Match: Menno Koch

25 February 2022 21	CSKA	4−0	Botev Vratsa	Sofia
17:30 UTC+2	Garcez 26'; Caicedo 34'; Mattheij 45+1'; Yomov 76'; Turitsov (yellow card) 86'	Report	Milanov (yellow card) 28'; Ivaylov (yellow card) 69'	Stadium: Stadion Balgarska Armia; Attendance: 0 Referee: Georgi Ivanov (Sofia); Man of the Match: Jurgen Mattheij
Note: The game was played without spectators as CSKA was serving a one-game ban due to fans throwing objects towards the pitch during their home game against Ludogorets.

6 March 2022 22	Levski	0−0	CSKA	Sofia
14:00 UTC+2	Tsunami (yellow card) 45' (yellow-red card) 54'; Stoilov (yellow card) 64'; Kraev (yellow card) 77'	Report	Youga (yellow card) 45+14'; Yomov (yellow card) 63'; Mazikou (red card) 90+2'	Stadium: Natsionalen stadion Vasil Levski; Attendance: 19,000; Referee: Valentin Zhelezov (Burgas); Man of the Match: Nikolay Mihaylov
Note: The game has been interrupted in the 15th minute of the first half to clean up the pitch from the heavy snowfall.

12 March 2022 23	CSKA	0−0	Tsarsko Selo	Sofia
17:30 UTC+2	Koch (yellow card) 45'; Geferson (yellow card) 87'	Report	Crăciun (yellow card) 29'; Petris (yellow card) 49'; N'Diaye (yellow card) 54'; Maccoppi (yellow card) 67'; Coppola (yellow card) 90+6'	Stadium: Stadion Balgarska Armia; Attendance: 650; Referee: Radoslav Gidzhenov (Plovdiv); Man of the Match: Nikolay Nikolaev

20 March 2022 24	Botev Plovdiv	2−0	CSKA	Plovdiv
15:15 UTC+2	Punčec (yellow card) 17'; Souprayen 24'; Nedelev 29'; Konate (yellow card) 55'; Rabeï (yellow card) 90+1'	Report	Youga (yellow card) 48'; Mazikou (yellow card) 69'	Stadium: Futbolen kompleks Botev 1912; Attendance: 3,200; Referee: Georgi Davidov (Veliko Tarnovo); Man of the Match: Todor Nedelev

2 April 2022 25	CSKA	1−0	Beroe	Sofia
20:00 UTC+3	Caicedo 53'; Geferson (yellow card) 55'; Yomov (yellow card) 60'; Mladenov (red card) 61'; Lam (yellow card) 68'; Vion (yellow card) 73'; Muhar (red card) 81'	Report	Furtado (yellow card) 3'; Lebon (yellow card) 68'	Stadium: Stadion Balgarska Armia; Attendance: 1,000; Referee: Ivaylo Stoyanov (Petrich); Man of the Match: Jordy Caicedo

8 April 2022 26	Lokomotiv Plovdiv	2−0	CSKA	Plovdiv
19:30 UTC+3	Bidounga 16'; Tomašević (yellow card) 29'; Karagaren (yellow card) 45+1', (goal) 52'	Report	Mazikou (yellow card) 22'; Nankov (yellow card) 68'; Carey (yellow card) 73'; Vion (yellow card) 88'	Stadium: Stadion Lokomotiv; Attendance: 5,000; Referee: Georgi Dimitrov (Sofia); Man of the Match: Birsent Karagaren

==== Championship round ====
===== League table =====
Pos	Team	Pld	W	D	L	GF	GA	GD	Pts	Qualification
1	Ludogorets Razgrad (C)	31	26	1	4	77	25	+52	79	Qualification for the Champions League first qualifying round
2	CSKA Sofia	31	16	10	5	42	31	+11	58	Qualification for the Europa Conference League second qualifying round
3	Botev Plovdiv (O)	31	15	8	8	38	33	+5	53	Qualification for the Europa Conference League play-off
4	Levski Sofia	31	15	7	9	38	27	+11	52	Qualification for the Europa Conference League second qualifying round (Note: Levski Sofia qualified for the Europa Conference League by winning the 2021–22 Bulgarian Cup.)
5	Cherno More	31	12	11	8	36	22	+14	47	
6	Slavia Sofia	31	9	10	12	35	38	−3	37	

Source: Soccerway, Bulgarian Football
Rules for classification: 1) Points; 2) Head-to-head points; 3) Head-to-head goal difference; 4) Head-to-head goals scored; 5) Head-to-head away goals scored (only if two teams); 6) Goal difference; 7) Goals scored; 8) Fairplay ranking; 9) Draw.
(C) Champions; (O) Play-off winners

===== Results summary =====
Overall								Home						Away					
Pld	W	D	L	GF	GA	GD	Pts	W	D	L	GF	GA	GD	W	D	L	GF	GA	GD
5	1	3	1	3	6	−3	6	1	2	0	3	1	+2	0	1	1	0	5	−5

Last updated: 22 May 2022.
Source: See results

===== Results by round =====
Round	1	2	3	4	5
Ground	H	A	H	H	A
Result	D	L	W	D	D
Position	2	2	2	2	2

Updated to match(es) played on 22 May 2022. Source: See Results
A = Away; H = Home; W = Win; D = Draw; L = Loss

===== Results =====
17 April 2022 27	CSKA	0−0	Levski	Sofia
17:00 UTC+3	Youga (yellow card) 37'; Carey (yellow card) 45+2'; Geferson (yellow card) 59'; Turitsov (yellow card) 75'	Report	Stefanov (yellow card) 51'; Welton (yellow card) 56'	Stadium: Natsionalen stadion Vasil Levski; Referee: Georgi Kabakov (Plovdiv); Man of the Match: Dimitar Evtimov

30 April 2022 28	Ludogorets	5−0	CSKA	Razgrad
20:00 UTC+3	Yankov 15', 56'; Tissera 30'; Tekpetey 51'; Thiago 63'; Gonçalves (yellow card) 73'	Report		Stadium: Huvepharma Arena; Referee: Radoslav Gidzhenov (Plovdiv); Man of the Match: Dominik Yankov

6 May 2022 29	CSKA	3−1	Slavia	Sofia
20:00 UTC+3	Yomov 2', 20'; Caicedo 36'; Baï (yellow card) 65'	Report	Kirilov 48'; Valchev (yellow card) 78'	Stadium: Stadion Balgarska Armia; Referee: Ivo Andreev (Sofia); Man of the Match: Georgi Yomov

19 May 2022 30	CSKA	0−0	Botev Plovdiv	Sofia
18:00 UTC+3	Geferson (yellow card) 47'; Muhar (yellow card) 57'; Pardew (yellow card) 85'	Report	Mertens (yellow card) 77'; Eto'o (yellow card) 79'; Valentić (yellow card) 84'; Toku (yellow card) 84'	Stadium: Stadion Balgarska Armia; Referee: Stanimir Trenchev (Sofia); Man of the Match: Dimitar Evtimov

22 May 2022 31	Cherno More	0−0	CSKA	Varna
20:30 UTC+3	Benchaâ (yellow card) 32'; Zlatev (yellow card) 45+1'; Serdyuk (yellow card) 47'	Report	Koch (yellow card) 36' (yellow-red card) 90+4'; Turitsov (yellow card) 44'; Baï (yellow card) 84'	Stadium: Stadion Ticha; Referee: Ivaylo Stoyanov (Petrich)

=== Bulgarian Cup ===
22 September 2021 1R	Hebar	0−3	CSKA	Sofia (Note: Hebar plays their first round home match at Stadion Balgarska Armia, Sofia, instead of their regular stadium Stadion Georgi Benkovski in Pazardzhik, which was not in optimal condition to host a football match.)
18:00 UTC+3	Terziev (yellow card) 13'; Dimitrov (yellow card) 15'; Karakashev (yellow card) 78'	Report	Caicedo 25', 41'; Ahmedov 27'	Stadium: Stadion Balgarska Armia; Attendance: 1,000; Referee: Vladimir Valkov (Plovdiv)

28 October 2021 2R	CSKA	2−0	Arda	Sofia
19:00 UTC+3	Caicedo 22', 36'; Mazikou (red card) 54'	Report	Kotev (yellow card) 24'; Delev (yellow card) 63'; Petkov (yellow card) 73'	Stadium: Stadion Balgarska Armia; Attendance: 850; Referee: Stanimir Trenchev (Sofia)

1 March 2022 QF	CSKA	2−0	Lokomotiv Plovdiv	Sofia
17:30 UTC+3	Caicedo 33'; Yomov 41'; Koch (yellow card) 50'; Geferson (yellow card) 54'; Muhar (yellow card) 87'	Report	Tomašević (yellow card) 15'; Paskalev (yellow card) 53'	Stadium: Stadion Balgarska Armia; Attendance: 4,000; Referee: Stanimir Trenchev (Sofia)

12 April 2022 SF Leg 1	Slavia	0−2	CSKA	Sofia
19:00 UTC+3	Tombak (yellow card) 39'; Valchev (yellow card) 46'; Soares (yellow card) 61'	Report	Zajkov 22' (o.g.); Mazikou (yellow card) 37'; Youga (yellow card) 46'; Turitsov (yellow card) 61', (goal) 90+2' (pen.); Baï (yellow card) 90+4'	Stadium: Stadion Aleksandar Shalamanov; Referee: Nikola Popov (Sofia); Man of the Match: Jordy Caicedo

21 April 2022 SF Leg 2	CSKA	0−2 (a.e.t.) (2−2 agg.) (7−6 p)	Slavia	Sofia
19:00 UTC+3	Vion (yellow card) 86'; Youga (yellow card) 97'; Carey (yellow card) 117'; Busatto (yellow card) 120+5'	Report	Tasev 8'; Minchev 12', (yellow card) 34'; Zagorčić (yellow card) 38'; G. Petkov (yellow card) 39'; Vutsov (yellow card) 101'	Stadium: Stadion Balgarska Armia; Referee: Volen Chinkov (Sofia); Man of the Match: Dimitar Evtimov
	Penalties
	Carey (penalty scored); Muhar (penalty scored); Youga (penalty scored); Lam (penalty scored); Caicedo (penalty scored); Donchev (penalty scored); Koch (penalty missed); Mazikou (penalty scored)		(penalty scored) Valchev; (penalty scored) Stoyanov; (penalty scored) Soares; (penalty scored) M. Petkov; (penalty scored) Kerchev; (penalty scored) Dobrev; (penalty missed) Nikolayevich; (penalty missed) Nguena

15 May 2022 F	CSKA	0−1	Levski	Sofia
17:00 UTC+3	Lam (yellow card) 19'; Yomov (yellow card) 65'; Youga (yellow card) 87'; Turitsov (yellow card) 90+2'	Report	Tsunami (yellow card) 23'; Stefanov 57'; Krastev (yellow card) 87'; Mihajlović (yellow card) 90+5'	Stadium: Natsionalen stadion Vasil Levski; Attendance: 35,000; Referee: Nikola Popov (Sofia); Man of the Match: Iliyan Stefanov

=== Bulgarian Supercup ===
17 July 2021 Final	Ludogorets	4−0	CSKA	Sofia
20:30 UTC+3	Santana (yellow card) 17', (goal) 29'; Yankov 41'; Sotiriou 49'; Nedyalkov (yellow card) 52'; Tchibota 84', (yellow card) 88'; Ikoko (yellow card) 89'	Report	Caicedo (yellow card) 17'; Galabov (yellow card) 66'; Yomov (yellow card) 88' (yellow-red card) 90+2'	Stadium: Natsionalen stadion Vasil Levski; Attendance: 8,800; Referee: Ivaylo Stoyanov (Petrich)

=== UEFA Europa Conference League ===
==== Second qualifying round ====
22 July 2021 First leg	CSKA (Bulgaria)	0−0	(Latvia) Liepāja	Sofia, Bulgaria
20:00 UTC+3	Carey (yellow card) 86'	Report	Dodô (yellow card) 18'; Simić (yellow card) 45'; Tkachuk (yellow card) 59'	Stadium: Stadion Balgarska Armia; Attendance: 2,600; Referee: Peter Bankes (England)

29 July 2021 Second leg	Liepāja (Latvia)	0−0 (0−0 agg.) (1−3 p)	(Bulgaria) CSKA	Liepāja, Latvia
17:00 UTC+3	Ukpa (yellow card) 53'; Mirosavljev (yellow card) 73'; Kārkliņš (yellow card) 89'; Ostojić (yellow card) 105+1'	Report	Turitsov (yellow card) 23'; Čataković (yellow card) 62'; Youga (yellow card) 111'	Stadium: Daugavas stadions Attendance: 453; Referee: Marcel Bîrsan (Romania)
	Penalties
	Simić (penalty scored); Tkachuk (penalty missed); Šabala (penalty missed); Keita (penalty missed)		(penalty scored) Carey; (penalty scored) Caicedo; (penalty missed) Ahmedov; (penalty scored) Geferson

==== Third qualifying round ====
5 August 2021 First leg	CSKA (Bulgaria)	4−2	(Croatia) Osijek	Sofia, Bulgaria
20:00 UTC+3	Mazikou 30'; Carey 39'; Caicedo 42'; Yomov 74'	Report	Žaper (yellow card) 30'; Mattheij 41' (o.g.); Topčagić 90+3'	Stadium: Natsionalen stadion Vasil Levski (Note: CSKA plays their third qualifying round home match at Natsionalen stadion Vasil Levski, Sofia, instead of their regular stadium Stadion Balgarska Armia, Sofia, which does not meet UEFA requirements for this stage of the tournament.); Attendance: 4,494; Referee: Donatas Rumšas (Lithuania)

12 August 2021 Second leg	Osijek (Croatia)	1−1 (3−5 agg.)	(Bulgaria) CSKA	Osijek, Croatia
22:15 UTC+3	Škorić 45', (yellow card) 84'; Miérez (yellow card) 48'; Bjelica (yellow card) 68'; Bule (yellow card) 74'; Lončar (red card) 86'	Report	Carey 33'; Busatto (yellow card) 54'; Geferson (yellow card) 76'; Wildschut (yellow card) 77'; Turitsov (yellow card) 83'; Youga (yellow card) 84'	Stadium: Stadion Gradski Vrt; Attendance: 3,706; Referee: Don Robertson (Scotland)

==== Play-off round ====
19 August 2021 First leg	Viktoria Plzeň (Czech Republic)	2−0	(Bulgaria) CSKA	Plzeň, Czech Republic
20:00 UTC+3	Havel 11'; Mosquera 72'; Chorý (yellow card) 90+1'	Report	Caicedo (yellow card) 30'; Youga (yellow card) 90+1'	Stadium: Doosan Arena; Attendance: 6,859; Referee: Tiago Martins (Portugal)

26 August 2021 Second leg	CSKA (Bulgaria)	3−0 (a.e.t.) (3−2 agg.)	(Czech Republic) Viktoria Plzeň	Sofia, Bulgaria
20:00 UTC+3	Carey 6'; Turitsov (yellow card) 52'; Yomov (yellow card) 61', (goal) 63'; Caicedo (yellow card) 67' (yellow-red card) 111'; Mattheij (yellow card) 79', (goal) 119'; Lam (yellow card) 100'	Report	Šulc (yellow card) 51'; Janošek (yellow card) 80'; Havel (yellow card) 117'	Stadium: Natsionalen stadion Vasil Levski (Note: CSKA plays their play-off round home match at Natsionalen stadion Vasil Levski, Sofia, instead of their regular stadium Stadion Balgarska Armia, Sofia, which does not meet UEFA requirements for this stage of the tournament.); Attendance: 6,717; Referee: Ali Palabıyık (Turkey)

==== Group stage ====
Pos	Team	Pld	W	D	L	GF	GA	GD	Pts	Qualification	ROM	BOD	ZOR	CSS
1	(Italy) Roma	6	4	1	1	18	11	+7	13	Advance to round of 16	—	2–2	4–0	5–1
2	(Norway) Bodø/Glimt	6	3	3	0	14	5	+9	12	Advance to knockout round play-offs	6–1	—	3–1	2–0
3	(Ukraine) Zorya Luhansk	6	2	1	3	5	11	−6	7		0–3	1–1	—	2–0
4	(Bulgaria) CSKA Sofia	6	0	1	5	3	13	−10	1		2–3	0–0	0–1	—

Source: UEFA
Rules for classification: Group stage tiebreakers

16 September 2021 1	Roma (Italy)	5–1	(Bulgaria) CSKA	Rome, Italy
22:00 UTC+3	Pellegrini 25', 62'; El Shaarawy 38'; Mancini 82'; Abraham 84'	Report	Carey 10'; Wildschut (yellow card) 67' (yellow-red card) 80'; Lam (yellow card) 90'	Stadium: Stadio Olimpico; Attendance: 29,876; Referee: Glenn Nyberg (Sweden)

30 September 2021 2	CSKA (Bulgaria)	0−0	(Norway) Bodø/Glimt	Sofia, Bulgaria
19:45 UTC+3	Baï (yellow card) 29'; Turitsov (yellow card) 76'	Report	Høibråten (yellow card) 5'; Khaykin (yellow card) 90+2'	Stadium: Natsionalen stadion Vasil Levski (Note: CSKA plays their group stage home matches at Natsionalen stadion Vasil Levski, Sofia, instead of their regular stadium Balgarska Armiya, Sofia, which does not meet UEFA requirements for this stage of the tournament.); Attendance: 7,291; Referee: Aleksandrs Anufrijevs (Latvia)

21 October 2021 3	CSKA (Bulgaria)	0−1	(Ukraine) Zorya Luhansk	Sofia, Bulgaria
22:00 UTC+3	Mattheij (yellow card) 46'; Wildschut (yellow card) 69'; Caicedo (yellow card) 77'; Mazikou (yellow card) 84'; Lam (yellow card) 85'; Vion (red card) 90+3'	Report	Khomchenovskyi (yellow card) 28'; Sayyadmanesh 64'; Cvek (yellow card) 89'; Favorov (yellow card) 90+7'	Stadium: Natsionalen stadion Vasil Levski; Attendance: 3,158; Referee: Manuel Schüttengruber (Austria)

4 November 2021 4	Zorya Luhansk (Ukraine)	2−0	(Bulgaria) CSKA	Zaporizhzhia, Ukraine
19:45 UTC+2	Vernydub (yellow card) 56'; Snurnitsyn (yellow card) 70'; Zahedi (yellow card) 76', (goal) 87'; Sayyadmanesh 90+5'	Report		Stadium: Slavutych-Arena (Note: Zorya Luhansk plays their group stage home matches at Slavutych-Arena, Zaporizhzhia, instead of their regular stadium Stadion Avanhard, Luhansk, due to the war conditions in Eastern Ukraine.); Attendance: 1,122; Referee: Petri Viljanen (Finland)

25 November 2021 5	Bodø/Glimt (Norway)	2−0	(Bulgaria) CSKA	Bodø, Norway
22:00 UTC+2	Fet 25'; Høibråten (yellow card) 55'; Botheim 85'	Report	Caicedo (yellow card) 2'; Youga (yellow card) 45'; Mattheij (yellow card) 50'	Stadium: Aspmyra Stadion; Attendance: 5,339; Referee: Yigal Frid (Israel)

9 December 2021 6	CSKA (Bulgaria)	2−3	(Italy) Roma	Sofia, Bulgaria
19:45 UTC+2	Vion (yellow card) 45'; Geferson (yellow card) 71'; Čataković 75'; Wildschut 90+3'	Report	Abraham 15', 53'; Bove (yellow card) 24'; Mancini (yellow card) 32'; Mayoral 34'; Kumbulla (yellow card) 60'	Stadium: Natsionalen stadion Vasil Levski; Attendance: 4,640; Referee: Nick Walsh (Scotland)

== Statistics ==
=== Appearances and goals ===
As of 22 May 2022

No.	Pos	Player	Parva Liga		Bulgarian Cup		Supercup		Conference League		Total	
No.	Pos	Player	Apps	Goals	Apps	Goals	Apps	Goals	Apps	Goals	Apps	Goals
1	GK	(Brazil) Gustavo Busatto	23	-22	2	-1	1	-4	12	-18	38	-45
2	DF	(Netherlands) Jurgen Mattheij	22	4	2+1	0	1	0	12	1	38	5
3	DF	(Brazil) Geferson	22+4	0	5	0	1	0	10+1	0	43	0
4	DF	(Netherlands) Menno Koch	12+1	1	4	0	0	0	0	0	17	1
5	MF	(Argentina) Federico Varela	7+7	0	3+1	0	1	0	0+3	0	22	0
6	DF	(Bulgaria) Hristiyan Petrov	2+3	0	0	0	0	0	0	0	5	0
7	MF	(France) Yohan Baï	12+11	3	0+3	0	1	0	4+3	0	34	3
8	MF	(Republic of Ireland) Graham Carey	18+5	1	4+1	0	0	0	11	4	39	5
9	FW	(Ecuador) Jordy Caicedo	27+1	16	6	5	1	0	11	1	46	22
10	MF	(Bulgaria) Georgi Yomov	23+3	8	5+1	1	0+1	0	10+2	2	45	11
14	FW	(Bulgaria) Kaloyan Krastev	1+17	0	0+2	0	0	0	1+4	0	25	0
15	DF	(France) Thibaut Vion	14+5	0	2+2	0	0	0	3+1	0	27	0
16	DF	(Bulgaria) Asen Donchev	3+6	0	1+1	0	0	0	0+1	0	12	0
17	FW	(Ghana) Bismark Charles	1+10	0	0+1	0	0	0	0+3	0	15	0
18	DF	(Republic of the Congo) Bradley Mazikou	22	2	6	0	1	0	12	1	41	3
19	DF	(Bulgaria) Ivan Turitsov	23+3	0	4	1	1	0	11	0	42	1
20	MF	(France) Junior Nzila	1+3	0	0	0	0+1	0	0	0	5	0
21	MF	(Central African Republic) Amos Youga	15+6	3	4+1	0	0+1	0	7+1	0	35	3
23	FW	(Bulgaria) Ahmed Ahmedov	3+3	0	1+1	1	0	0	0+6	0	14	1
24	MF	(Croatia) Karlo Muhar	21+4	2	4+2	0	0	0	4+1	0	36	2
25	GK	(Bulgaria) Dimitar Evtimov	8	-9	4	-2	0	0	0	0	12	-11
26	DF	(Bulgaria) Rosen Bozhinov	1+1	0	0	0	0	0	0	0	2	0
27	FW	(Brazil) Maurício Garcez	4+6	1	2+1	0	0	0	0	0	13	1
28	FW	(Colombia) Brayan Moreno	1+2	0	0	0	0	0	0	0	3	0
29	DF	(Finland) Thomas Lam	20+2	0	3+2	0	0	0	6+1	0	34	0
30	MF	(Suriname) Yanic Wildschut	19+10	0	2+2	0	1	0	9+2	1	45	1
—	DF	(Luxembourg) Enes Mahmutovic	0	0	0	0	0	0	0	0	0	0
Players who appeared for CSKA Sofia that left during the season:
11	FW	(Bosnia and Herzegovina) Hamza Čataković	4+2	0	0	0	1	0	1+4	1	12	1
20	DF	(Estonia) Karol Mets	8+4	0	1+1	0	0	0	0	0	14	0
22	FW	(Bulgaria) Radoslav Zhivkov	1	0	0	0	0+1	0	0+1	0	3	0
26	DF	(Bulgaria) Valentin Antov	1	0	0	0	0+1	0	6	0	8	0
28	DF	(Bulgaria) Plamen Galabov	2+5	0	1	0	1	0	2+3	0	14	0

=== Goalscorers ===
Place	Position	Nation	Number	Name	Parva Liga	Bulgarian Cup	Conference League	Total
1	FW	(Ecuador)	9	Jordy Caicedo	16	5	1	22
2	MF	(Bulgaria)	10	Georgi Yomov	8	1	2	11
3	DF	(Netherlands)	2	Jurgen Mattheij	4	0	1	5
3	MF	(Republic of Ireland)	8	Graham Carey	1	0	4	5
5	MF	(France)	7	Yohan Baï	3	0	0	3
5	DF	(Republic of the Congo)	18	Bradley Mazikou	2	0	1	3
5	MF	(Central African Republic)	21	Amos Youga	3	0	0	3
8	MF	(Croatia)	24	Karlo Muhar	2	0	0	2
9	DF	(Netherlands)	4	Menno Koch	1	0	0	1
9	FW	(Bosnia and Herzegovina)	11	Hamza Čataković	0	0	1	1
9	DF	(Bulgaria)	19	Ivan Turitsov	0	1	0	1
9	FW	(Bulgaria)	23	Ahmed Ahmedov	0	1	0	1
9	FW	(Brazil)	27	Maurício Garcez	1	0	0	1
9	MF	(Suriname)	30	Yanic Wildschut	0	0	1	1
				Own goal	1	1	0	2
TOTALS					42	9	11	42

As of 22 May 2022

=== Disciplinary record ===
Includes all competitive matches. Players listed below made at least one appearance for CSKA first squad during the season.

N	P	Nat.	Name	Parva Liga			Bulgarian Cup			Supercup			Conference League			Total			Notes
N	P	Nat.	Name	Yellow card	Second yellow card	Red card	Yellow card	Second yellow card	Red card	Yellow card	Second yellow card	Red card	Yellow card	Second yellow card	Red card	Yellow card	Second yellow card	Red card	Notes
1	GK	(Brazil)	Gustavo Busatto	1			1						1			3			
2	DF	(Netherlands)	Jurgen Mattheij	7									3			10			
3	DF	(Brazil)	Geferson	10	1		1						2			13	1		
4	DF	(Netherlands)	Menno Koch	2	1		1									3	1		
7	MF	(France)	Yohan Baï	3			1						1			5			
8	MF	(Republic of Ireland)	Graham Carey	5	1		1						1			7	1		
9	FW	(Ecuador)	Jordy Caicedo	3						1			4	1		8	1		
10	MF	(Bulgaria)	Georgi Yomov	3			1			1	1		1			6	1		
11	FW	(Bosnia and Herzegovina)	Hamza Čataković	1									1			2			
15	DF	(France)	Thibaut Vion	4			1						1		1	6		1	
16	DF	(Bulgaria)	Asen Donchev	1												1			
17	FW	(Ghana)	Bismark Charles	3												3			
18	DF	(Republic of the Congo)	Bradley Mazikou	6		1	1		1				1			8		2	
19	DF	(Bulgaria)	Ivan Turitsov	9			2						4			15			
20	DF	(Estonia)	Karol Mets	3												3			
21	MF	(Central African Republic)	Amos Youga	7			3						4			14			
22	FW	(Bulgaria)	Radoslav Zhivkov	1												1			
23	FW	(Bulgaria)	Ahmed Ahmedov	1												1			
24	MF	(Croatia)	Karlo Muhar	5	1	1	1									6	1	1	
25	GK	(Bulgaria)	Dimitar Evtimov	1												1			
26	DF	(Bulgaria)	Valentin Antov	1												1			
28	DF	(Bulgaria)	Plamen Galabov							1						1			
29	DF	(Finland)	Thomas Lam	4			1						3			8			
30	MF	(Suriname)	Yanic Wildschut	1									3	1		4	1		
Manager		(England)	Alan Pardew	1												1			
Manager		(Bulgaria)	Stoycho Mladenov	2		1										2		1	
Manager		(Bulgaria)	Anatoli Nankov	1												1			
Manager		(Bulgaria)	Lyuboslav Penev	1	1											1	1		

Last updated: 22 May 2022
Source: Competitive matches
Ordered by (red card) , (second yellow card) and (yellow card)
(yellow card) = Number of bookings; (second yellow card) = Number of sending offs after a second yellow card; (red card) = Number of sending offs by a direct red card.

== See also ==
- PFC CSKA Sofia
