= 2021 Bulgarian Supercup =

Финал за Суперкупата на България 2021
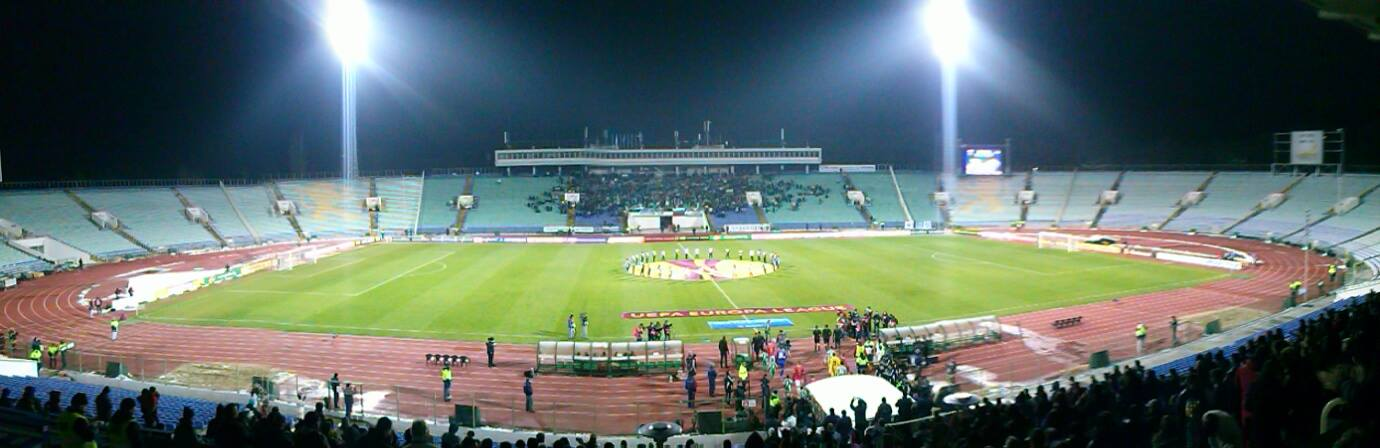
Ludogorets	CSKA Sofia
First League	Bulgarian Cup
4	0
- Date: 17 July 2021
- Venue: Vasil Levski, Sofia
- Referee: Ivaylo Stoyanov (Petrich)
- Attendance: 8,800
- Weather: Clear; 28 °C (82 °F)

The 2021 Bulgarian Supercup was the 18th edition of the Bulgarian Supercup, an annual football match played between the winners of the previous season's First League and the Bulgarian Cup. The game was played between the champions of the 2020–21 First League, Ludogorets Razgrad, and the 2020–21 Bulgarian Cup winners, CSKA Sofia.

This was Ludogorets's 9th Bulgarian Supercup appearance and CSKA Sofia's 6th. The two teams have not played yet for the Supercup, as the 2016 game between the two teams was not held.

Ludogorets won the game by the resounding scoreline of 4–0, claiming their 5th Supercup trophy.

== Match details ==
17 July 2021
20:30 UTC+3

Ludogorets Razgrad	4−0	CSKA Sofia
Santana 29'; Yankov 41'; Sotiriou 49'; Tchibota 84'	Report

Vasil Levski National Stadium, Sofia
Attendance: 8,800
Referee: Ivaylo Stoyanov (Petrich)

Ludogorets	CSKA

GK	71	(Croatia) Kristijan Kahlina
RB	4	(Bulgaria) Cicinho		(substituted off) 78'
CB	30	(Ukraine) Ihor Plastun
CB	24	(Benin) Olivier Verdon
LB	3	(Bulgaria) Anton Nedyalkov (c)	(yellow card) 52'
DM	8	(Portugal) Claude Gonçalves
CM	7	(Brazil) Alex Santana	(yellow card) 17'	(substituted off) 69'
CM	64	(Bulgaria) Dominik Yankov		(substituted off) 78'
RW	95	(Brazil) Cauly
CF	19	(Cyprus) Pieros Sotiriou		(substituted off) 69'
LW	11	(Bulgaria) Kiril Despodov		(substituted off) 85'
Substitutes:
GK	1	(Netherlands) Sergio Padt
DF	5	(Bulgaria) Georgi Terziev
DF	22	(Democratic Republic of the Congo) Jordan Ikoko	(substituted in) 78'	(yellow card) 89'
MF	37	(Ghana) Bernard Tekpetey	(substituted in) 69'
MF	88	(Bulgaria) Wanderson	(substituted in) 69'
FW	10	(Netherlands) Elvis Manu	(substituted in) 85'
FW	13	(Republic of the Congo) Mavis Tchibota	(substituted in) 78'	(yellow card) 88'
Manager:
(Lithuania) Valdas Dambrauskas

GK	1	(Brazil) Gustavo Busatto
RB	19	(Bulgaria) Ivan Turitsov		(substituted off) 46'
CB	2	(Netherlands) Jurgen Mattheij
CB	28	(Bulgaria) Plamen Galabov	(yellow card) 66'
LB	18	(France) Bradley Mazikou
DM	3	(Brazil) Geferson (c)
RM	7	(France) Yohan Baï
CM	11	(Bosnia and Herzegovina) Hamza Čataković		(substituted off) 46'
CM	5	(Argentina) Federico Varela		(substituted off) 72'
LM	30	(Netherlands) Yanic Wildschut		(substituted off) 58'
CF	9	(Ecuador) Jordy Caicedo	(yellow card) 17'	(substituted off) 56'
Substitutes:
GK	12	(Bulgaria) Aleks Bozhev
DF	26	(Bulgaria) Valentin Antov	(substituted in) 46'
MF	6	(France) Junior Nzila	(substituted in) 46'
MF	21	(Central African Republic) Amos Youga	(substituted in) 72'
MF	29	(Bulgaria) Hristiyan Petrov
FW	10	(Bulgaria) Georgi Yomov	(substituted in) 58'	(yellow card) 88' (yellow-red card) 90+2'
FW	22	(Bulgaria) Radoslav Zhivkov	(substituted in) 56'
Manager:
(Bulgaria) Lyuboslav Penev

MATCH OFFICIALS

- Assistant referees:
  - Ivo Kolev (Sofia)
  - Miroslav Maksimov (Sandanski)
- Fourth official:
  - Nikola Popov (Sofia)
- Video assistant referee:
  - Volen Chinkov (Sofia)
- Assistant video assistant referee:
  - Deniz Sokolov (Sofia)

MATCH RULES

- 90 minutes.
- No overtime.
- Penalty shoot-out if scores still level.
- Seven named substitutes.
- Maximum of five substitutions. (Note: Each team was given only three opportunities to make substitutions excluding substitutions made at half-time.)
