= Hamza Čataković =

Bosnian footballer (born 1997)

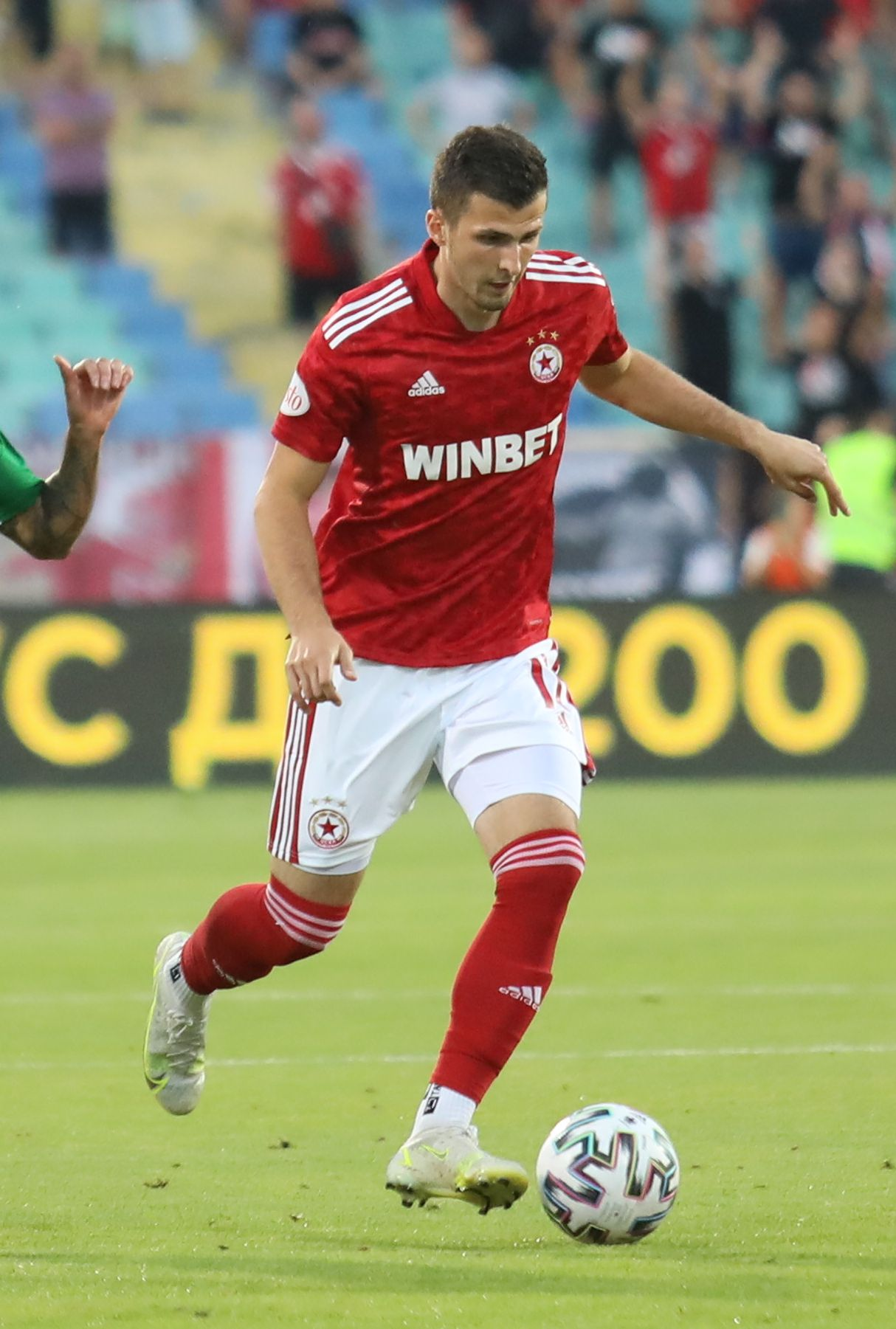
- Čataković playing for CSKA Sofia in 2021

Personal information
- Date of birth: 15 January 1997 (age 29)
- Place of birth: Cazin, Bosnia and Herzegovina
- Height: 1.87 m (6 ft 2 in)
- Position: Forward

Team information
- Current team: AEL Limassol
- Number: 7

Youth career
- NK Mladost Polje
- Krajina Cazin
- 2015–2016: Sarajevo

Senior career*
Years	Team	Apps	(Gls)
2016–2017	Sarajevo	3	(1)
2017–2021	Trenčín	101	(38)
2021–2022	CSKA Sofia	6	(0)
2022–2024	Sarajevo	78	(28)
2024–2026	Esenler Erokspor	70	(24)
2026–	AEL Limassol	1	(1)

International career
2015	Bosnia and Herzegovina U19	2	(0)
2017–2018	Bosnia and Herzegovina U21	3	(1)
- * Club domestic league appearances and goals as of 01:04, 31 August 2026 (UTC)

Hamza Čataković (Bosnian pronunciation: [xǎmza tʃǎtakoʋitɕ]; born 15 January 1997) is a Bosnian professional footballer who plays as a forward for Cypriot First Division club AEL Limassol.

Čataković started his professional career at Sarajevo, before joining Trenčín in 2017.

== Club career ==
=== Early career ===
Čataković started playing football at local clubs, before joining Sarajevo's youth academy in 2015. In July 2015, Čataković won the golden boot at the CEE Cup in Czech Republic, with 6 goals. He made his professional debut against Slavija on 4 November 2015 at the age of 18. On 20 March 2016, he scored his first professional goal against the same opponent.

In June 2016, he suffered a severe knee injury, which was diagnosed as anterior cruciate ligament tear and was sidelined for almost a year.

=== Trenčín ===
In January 2017, while still recovering from the injury, Čataković was loaned to Slovak team AS Trenčín until the end of season. In June, he signed a three-year deal with them. He scored on his competitive debut for the club in UEFA Europa League qualifier against Torpedo Kutaisi on 29 June. A month later, on his league debut, he provided an assist for the winning goal against Senica. On 10 March 2018, he scored his first league goal, in an away loss to Spartak Trnava.

In January 2020, he extended his contract until June 2021.

== International career ==
Čataković represented Bosnia and Herzegovina on various youth levels.

== Career statistics ==
=== Club ===
As of match played 30 August 2026

Appearances and goals by club, season and competition
Club	Season	League			National cup (Note: Includes Bosnian Cup, Slovak Cup, Bulgarian Cup, Turkish Cup)		Continental		Other		Total	
Club	Season	Division	Apps	Goals	Apps	Goals	Apps	Goals	Apps	Goals	Apps	Goals
Sarajevo	2015–16	Bosnian Premier League	3	1	1	0	0	0	—		4	1
Sarajevo	2016–17	Bosnian Premier League	0	0	0	0	—		—		0	0
Sarajevo	Total		3	1	1	0	0	0	—		4	1
Trenčín (loan)	2016–17	Slovak First League	0	0	0	0	0	0	—		0	0
Trenčín	2017–18	Slovak First League	20	7	1	0	4 (Note: Appearances in UEFA Europa League)	1	2 (Note: Appearances in the 2017–18 Slovak Super Liga play-offs for UEFA Europa League)	1	27	9
Trenčín	2018–19	Slovak First League	29	12	1	1	8	3	1 (Note: Appearance in the 2018–19 Slovak Super Liga relegation play-offs)	0	39	16
Trenčín	2019–20	Slovak First League	25	7	4	5	—		1 (Note: Appearance in the 2019–20 Slovak Super Liga play-offs for UEFA Europa League)	0	30	12
Trenčín	2020–21	Slovak First League	27	12	4	0	—		—		31	12
Trenčín	Total		101	38	10	6	12	4	4	1	127	49
CSKA Sofia	2021–22	Bulgarian First League	6	0	0	0	5 (Note: Appearance(s) in UEFA Europa Conference League)	1	1 (Note: Appearance in Bulgarian Supercup)	0	12	1
Sarajevo	2021–22	Bosnian Premier League	14	3	4	2	0	0	—		18	5
Sarajevo	2022–23	Bosnian Premier League	28	6	1	1	—		—		29	7
Sarajevo	2023–24	Bosnian Premier League	33	17	4	2	1	0	—		38	19
Sarajevo	2024–25	Bosnian Premier League	3	2	0	0	4	0	—		7	2
Sarajevo	Total		78	28	9	5	5	0	—		92	33
Esenler Erokspor	2024–25	TFF First League	34	10	0	0	—		—		34	10
Esenler Erokspor	2025–26	TFF First League	35	14	1	0	—		1 (Note: Appearance in the 2025–26 TFF 1. Lig promotion playoffs)	0	37	14
Esenler Erokspor	Total		69	24	1	0	—		1	0	71	24
AEL Limassol	2026–27	Cypriot First Division	1	0	0	0	—		—		1	0
Career total			258	91	21	11	22	5	6	1	307	108
