= Ludovic Soares =

Cape Verdean footballer (born 1994)

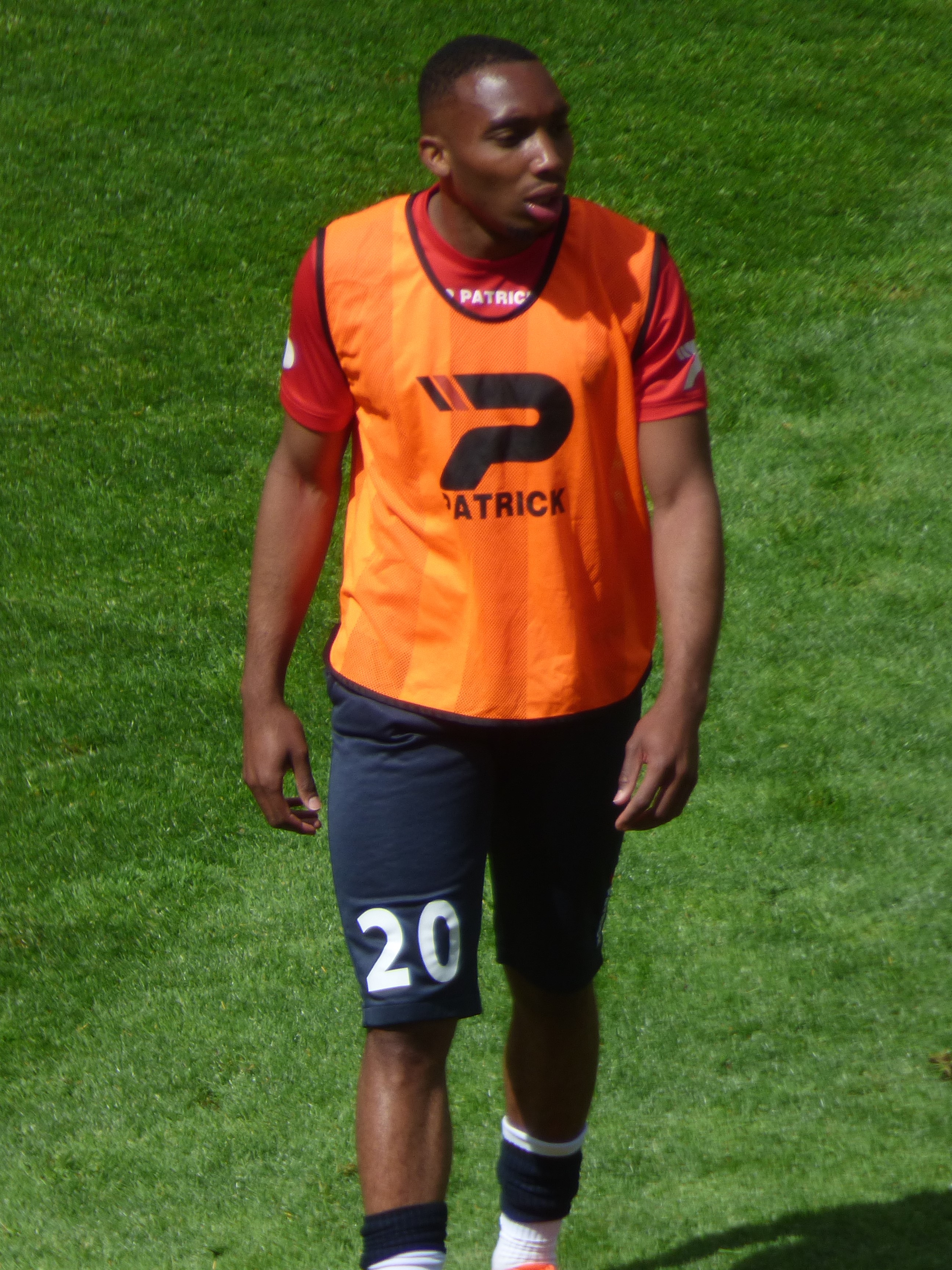
- Soares in 2019

Personal information
- Date of birth: 8 May 1994 (age 32)
- Place of birth: Thonon-les-Bains, France
- Height: 1.73 m (5 ft 8 in)
- Position: Left-back

Senior career*
Years	Team	Apps	(Gls)
2013–2016	Evian B	41	(2)
2015–2016	Evian	25	(0)
2016–2017	Red Star	0	(0)
2017–2019	Clermont	10	(0)
2017–2019	Clermont II	20	(2)
2019–2021	Laval	18	(0)
2019–2021	Laval II	5	(0)
2021–2024	Slavia Sofia	57	(1)

International career^{‡}
2022–	Cape Verde	3	(0)
- * Club domestic league appearances and goals as of 13 July 2024 ‡ National team caps and goals as of 5 May 2023

Ludovic Soares (born 8 May 1994) is a professional footballer who plays as a left-back. Born in France, he plays for the Cape Verde national team.

== Club career ==
Soares joined Évian Thonon Gaillard in 2007. He made his senior debut as a late substitute in the first game of the 2015–16 Ligue 2 season, a 0–0 draw against Nîmes. He signed his first professional contract with the club on 8 September 2015.

Released by Évian TG, Soares signed for Red Star on a two-year deal in July 2016.

In July 2017, Soares signed a three-year deal with Clermont Foot.

Soares joined Laval from Clermont in the summer of 2019, he started the 2019–20 season as first choice left-back. He gradually lost his place during the season and suffered from injury. He agreed mutual termination of his contract in January 2021, having made 18 league appearances for the club.

On 12 July 2021, Soares signed a three-year deal with Slavia Sofia.

== International career ==
Soares was born in France, and is Cape Verdean by descent. He debuted with the Cape Verde national team on 23 March 2022, in a 2–0 friendly win over Guadeloupe.
