= Georgi Valchev =

Bulgarian footballer (born 1991)

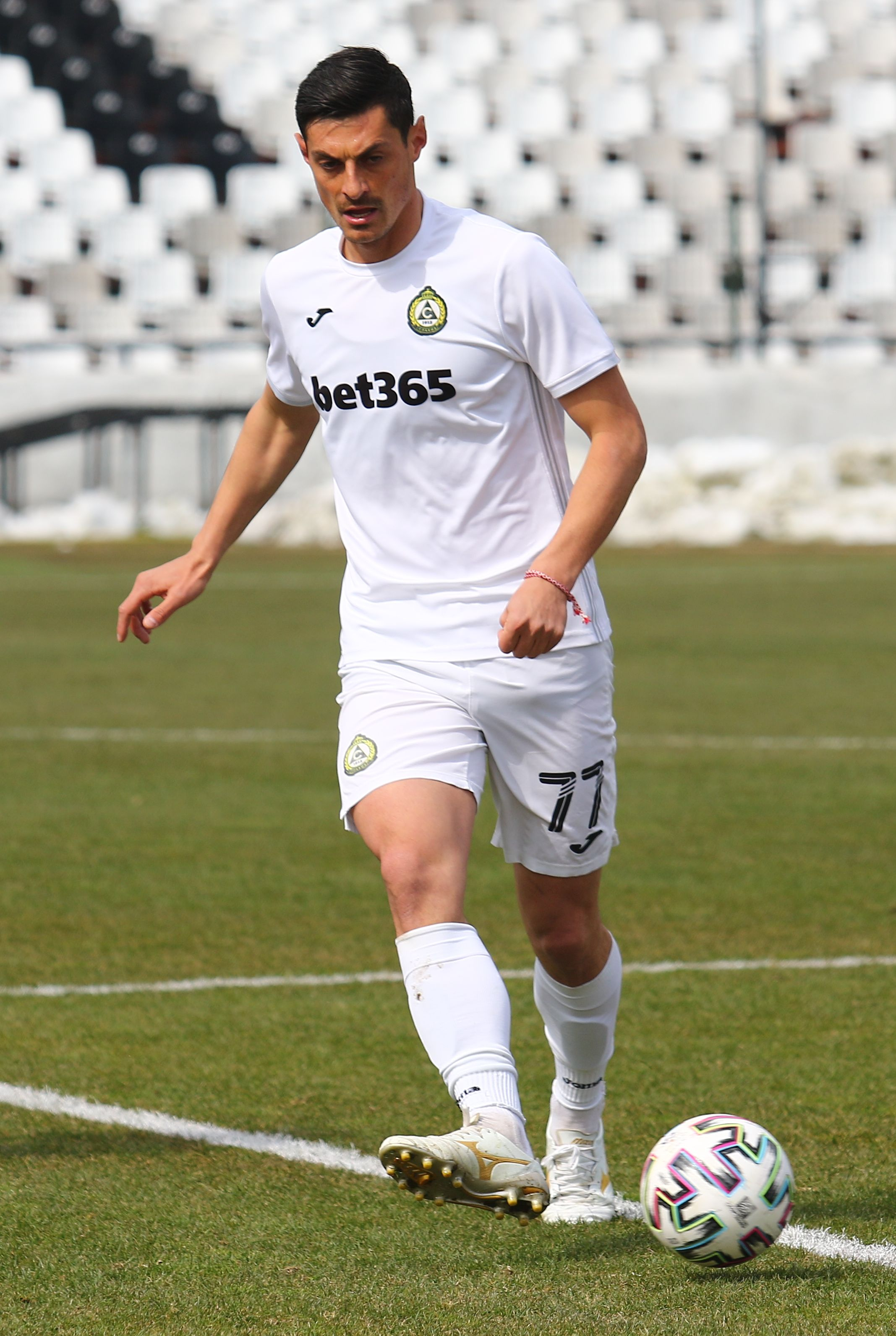

Personal information
- Full name: Georgi Tomov Valchev
- Date of birth: 7 March 1991 (age 35)
- Place of birth: Sandanski, Bulgaria
- Height: 1.87 m (6 ft 2 in)
- Position: Midfielder

Team information
- Current team: Hebar Pazardzhik
- Number: 7

Senior career*
Years	Team	Apps	(Gls)
2010–2012	Chavdar Etropole	46	(3)
2013	Svetkavitsa	10	(1)
2013	Neftochimic 1986	6	(0)
2014	Lyubimets 2007	13	(3)
2014–2016	Lokomotiv Plovdiv	46	(0)
2017	Neftochimic Burgas	7	(2)
2018	Vereya	5	(0)
2018–2019	Botev Vratsa	44	(2)
2020–2022	Slavia Sofia	70	(4)
2022–2024	Hebar Pazardzhik	41	(2)
2024–	Pirin Blagoevgrad	13	(0)
- * Club domestic league appearances and goals as of 24 October 2024

Georgi Tomov Valchev (Bulgarian: Георги Томов Вълчев; born 7 March 1991) is a Bulgarian footballer who plays as a midfielder for Pirin Blagoevgrad.

== Career ==
Valchev previously played for Chavdar Etropole, Svetkavitsa, Lokomotiv Plovdiv, Neftochimic Burgas and Vereya.

In July 2018, he joined Botev Vratsa.
