= Bradley Mazikou =

Footballer (born 1996)

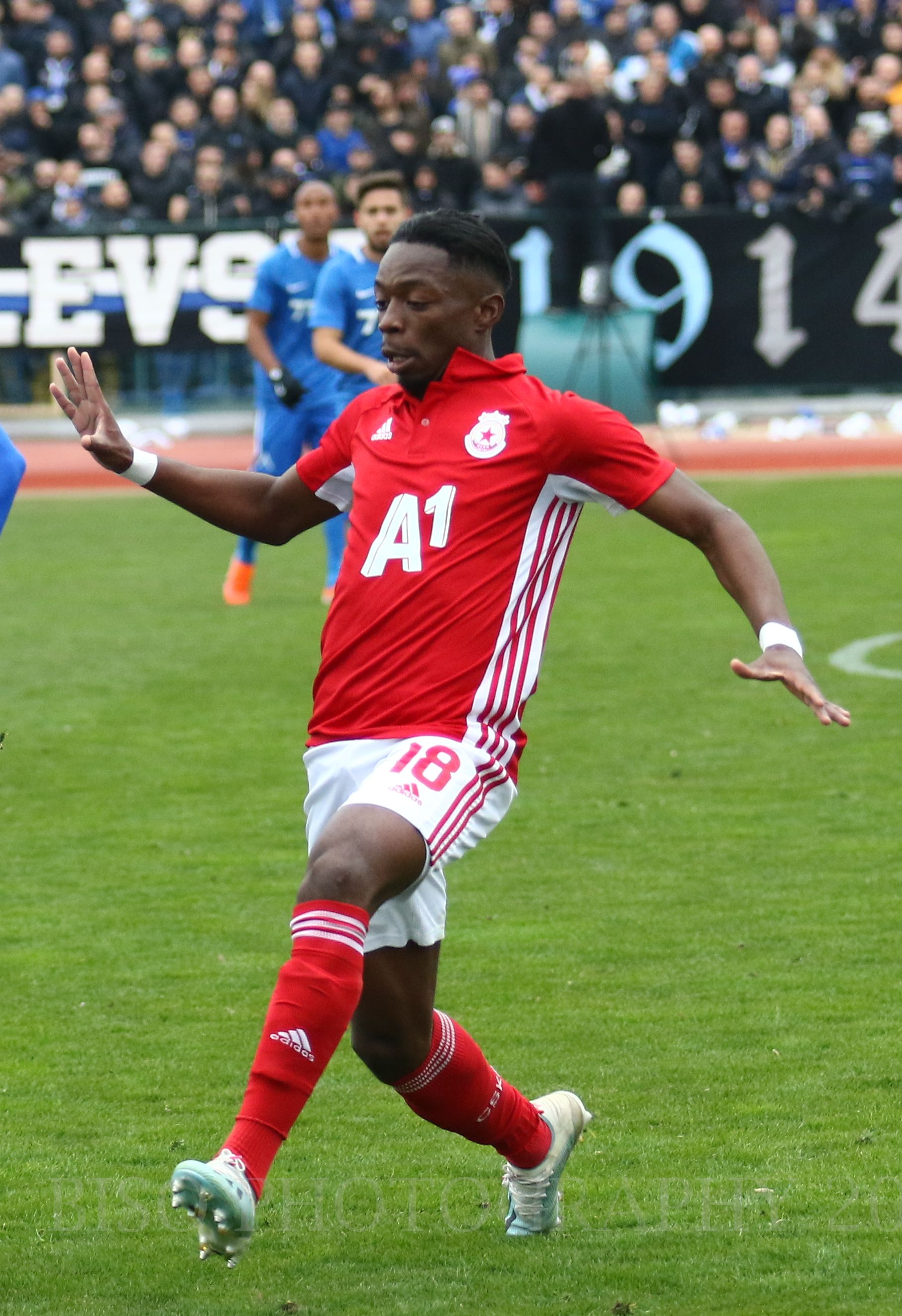
- Mazikou in 2020

Personal information
- Full name: Bradley Lovelife Mazikou
- Date of birth: 2 June 1996 (age 30)
- Place of birth: Orléans, France
- Height: 1.77 m (5 ft 10 in)
- Position: Left-back

Team information
- Current team: Servette
- Number: 18

Senior career*
| Years | Team | Apps | (Gls) |
| 2015–2019 | Lorient | 1 | (0) |
| 2017–2018 | → Dunkerque (loan) | 21 | (0) |
| 2018–2019 | → Cholet (loan) | 26 | (0) |
| 2019–2022 | CSKA Sofia | 73 | (3) |
| 2022–2023 | Aris | 28 | (0) |
| 2023– | Servette | 103 | (0) |

International career^{‡}
| 2020–2023 | Congo | 9 | (0) |
- * Club domestic league appearances and goals as of 28 September 2026 ‡ National team caps and goals as of 13 December 2023

Bradley Lovelife Mazikou (born 2 June 1996) is a professional footballer who plays as a left-back for Swiss Super League club Servette. Born in France, he represents Congo at international level.

== Career ==
Mazikou began his senior career with Lorient but was unable to break into the first-team. He managed just one appearance, playing full 90 minutes in a 3–2 away loss against Stade Rennais in the Coupe de la Ligue on 26 October 2016.

Mazikou played two seasons regularly for Lorient B and spent time on loan at Dunkerque and Cholet in the Championnat National, before joining Bulgarian club CSKA Sofia on a three years deal.

Mazikou joined CSKA Sofia for an undisclosed fee on 20 August 2019.

On 5 July 2022, Mazikou signed a three-year contract with Aris.

== International career ==
Born in France, Mazikou is of Brazzaville-Congolese descent. Mazikou debuted for the Republic of the Congo national team in a 2–0 2021 Africa Cup of Nations qualification win over Eswatini on 12 November 2020.

== Career statistics ==
=== Club ===
As of 4 May 2024

Appearances and goals by club, season and competition
| Club | Season | League | | | National cup | | League cup | | Continental | | Other | | Total | |
| Club | Season | Division | Apps | Goals | Apps | Goals | Apps | Goals | Apps | Goals | Apps | Goals | Apps | Goals |
|---|---|---|---|---|---|---|---|---|---|---|---|---|---|---|
| Lorient B | 2014–15 | National 2 | 10 | 1 | — | | — | | — | | — | | 10 | 1 |
| Lorient B | 2015–16 | National 2 | 26 | 0 | — | | — | | — | | — | | 26 | 0 |
| Lorient B | 2016–17 | National 2 | 24 | 0 | — | | — | | — | | — | | 24 | 0 |
| Lorient B | Total | | 60 | 1 | 0 | 0 | 0 | 0 | 0 | 0 | 0 | 0 | 60 | 1 |
| Lorient | 2015–16 | Ligue 1 | 0 | 0 | 0 | 0 | 0 | 0 | — | | — | | 0 | 0 |
| Lorient | 2016–17 | Ligue 1 | 0 | 0 | 0 | 0 | 1 | 0 | — | | — | | 1 | 0 |
| Lorient | Total | | 0 | 0 | 0 | 0 | 1 | 0 | 0 | 0 | 0 | 0 | 1 | 0 |
| Dunkerque (loan) | 2017–18 | National | 21 | 0 | 2 | 0 | 0 | 0 | — | | — | | 23 | 0 |
| Cholet (loan) | 2018–19 | National | 25 | 0 | 1 | 0 | 0 | 0 | — | | — | | 26 | 0 |
| Cholet (loan) | 2019–20 | National | 1 | 0 | 0 | 0 | 0 | 0 | — | | — | | 1 | 0 |
| Cholet (loan) | Total | | 26 | 0 | 1 | 0 | 0 | 0 | 0 | 0 | 0 | 0 | 27 | 0 |
| CSKA Sofia | 2019–20 | First League | 25 | 0 | 6 | 0 | — | | 0 | 0 | — | | 31 | 0 |
| CSKA Sofia | 2020–21 | First League | 25 | 1 | 5 | 0 | — | | 8 (Note: Appearances in UEFA Europa League) | 0 | — | | 38 | 1 |
| CSKA Sofia | 2021–22 | First League | 23 | 2 | 7 | 0 | — | | 12 (Note: Appearances in UEFA Conference League) | 1 | 1 | 0 | 40 | 3 |
| CSKA Sofia | Total | | 73 | 3 | 17 | 0 | — | | 20 | 1 | 1 | 0 | 109 | 4 |
| Aris | 2022–23 | Super League Greece | 28 | 0 | 4 | 0 | — | | 3 | 0 | — | | 35 | 0 |
| Servette | 2023–24 | Swiss Super League | 27 | 0 | 5 | 1 | — | | 12 (Note: Four appearances in the UEFA Champions League, five appearances in UEFA Europa League, three appearances in UEFA Conference League) | 0 | — | | 44 | 1 |
| Career total | | | 234 | 3 | 29 | 1 | 1 | 0 | 35 | 1 | 1 | 0 | 293 | 6 |

=== International ===
As of match played 12 November 2020

Appearances and goals by national team and year
| National team | Year | Apps | Goals |
|---|---|---|---|
| Republic of the Congo | 2020 | 1 | 0 |
| Total | | 1 | 0 |

== Honours ==
CSKA Sofia

- Bulgarian Cup: 2020–21

Servette FC

- Swiss Cup: 2023–24
