= Georgi Karakashev =

Bulgarian artist

- Born: 23 April 1899; Ruse, Bulgaria
- Died: 11 August 1970 (aged 71); Sofia, Bulgaria
- Occupation: Artist

Georgi Karakashev (23 April 1899 – 11 August 1970) was a Bulgarian artist. His work was part of the art competition at the 1932 Summer Olympics. According to the Bulgarian Academy of Sciences, Karakashev was among a list of artists who laid the foundations of theatrical design in Bulgaria in the 1930s–1950s, in a list also including Pencho Georgiev among others. His set designs "tended to be one-dimensional and decorative and reflected the influence of the Russian artistic circle known as Mir Izkustv (Art World) and the spirit of Art Nouveau."
