= Geferson =

Brazilian footballer (born 1994)

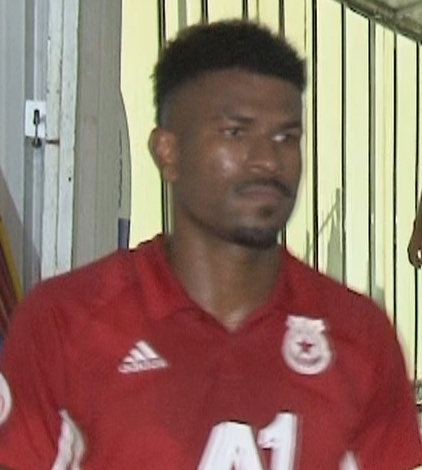
- Geferson in 2019

Personal information
- Full name: Geferson Cerqueira Teles
- Date of birth: 13 May 1994 (age 32)
- Place of birth: Lauro de Freitas, Brazil
- Height: 1.81 m (5 ft 11 in)
- Positions: Defensive midfielder; left back

Team information
- Current team: Atlético Piauiense

Youth career
- 2002–2010: Vitória
- 2011–2014: Internacional

Senior career*
Years	Team	Apps	(Gls)
2014–2017	Internacional	39	(0)
2017	→ Vitória (loan)	35	(1)
2018–2023	CSKA Sofia	110	(2)
2024	Paysandu	2	(0)
2024	Londrina	9	(0)
2025–	Atlético Piauiense	0	(0)

International career
2011	Brazil U17		
- * Club domestic league appearances and goals as of 18:23, 1 January 2025 (UTC)

Geferson Cerqueira Teles (born 13 May 1994), known as Geferson, is a Brazilian professional footballer who plays as a defensive midfielder.

== Club career ==
=== Internacional ===
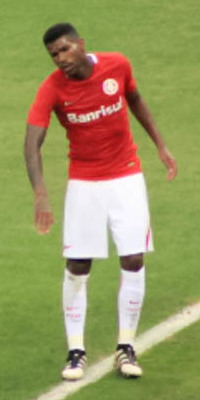
Geferson with Internacional in 2016

Born in Lauro de Freitas, Bahia, Geferson started his career at Vitória's youth setup in 2002, aged eight. In 2011, he signed for Internacional and spent three years playing in the youth academy.

In 2014 Geferson was promoted to the main squad, but made no official appearances over the year. After the arrival of new coach Diego Aguirre, he was named as a backup to Fabrício, and made his debut as a senior on 14 February 2015, starting in a 2–1 away win against Caxias, for that year's Campeonato Gaúcho.

After Fabrício's loan to Cruzeiro, Geferson was made a starter by Aguirre, and appeared in nine matches during the tournament. On 23 May 2015 he made his Série A debut, playing the full 90 minutes in a 1–1 away draw against Vasco da Gama.

In January 2018, Geferson signed a contract with Bulgarian elite club CSKA Sofia. He left after 5 years spent in the club and 160 matches in all tournaments.

== International career ==
After representing Brazil at the under-17 level, Geferson was called up to the main squad on 29 May 2015 for the year's Copa América, as a replacement for the injured Marcelo, but Filipe Luís occupied Brazil's starting left-back position as they reached the quarter-finals.

== Career statistics ==
As of 7 June 2023

Appearances and goals by club, season and competition
Club	Season	League		Cup		Continental		Other (Note: Including Campeonato Gaúcho.)		Total	
Club	Season	Apps	Goals	Apps	Goals	Apps	Goals	Apps	Goals	Apps	Goals
Internacional	2014	0	0	0	0	–		0	0	0	0
Internacional	2015	12	0	2	0	5	0	11	0	30	0
Internacional	2016	15	0	0	0	0	0	0	0	15	0
Internacional	Total	27	0	2	0	5	0	11	0	45	0
Vitória (loan)	2017	19	0	0	0	–		0	0	19	0
CSKA Sofia	2017–18	13	0	1	0	–		–		14	0
CSKA Sofia	2018–19	16	0	1	0	4	0	–		21	0
CSKA Sofia	2019–20	19	1	4	0	6	1	–		29	2
CSKA Sofia	2020–21	15	0	4	0	6	0	–		25	0
CSKA Sofia	2021–22	26	0	5	0	11	0	1	0	43	0
CSKA Sofia	2022–23	21	1	1	0	6	0	0	0	28	1
CSKA Sofia	Total	110	2	16	0	33	1	1	0	160	3
Career total		156	2	18	0	38	2	12	0	224	4

== Honours ==
CSKA Sofia

- Bulgarian Cup: 2020–21
