= Matteo Lucarelli =

Italian footballer

Personal information
- Date of birth: 10 October 2001 (age 25)
- Place of birth: Livorno, Italy
- Height: 1.86 m (6 ft 1 in)
- Position: Defender

Team information
- Current team: S.P.A.L.
- Number: 5

Youth career
- 2016–2019: Parma
- 2019: Inter Milan

Senior career*
Years	Team	Apps	(Gls)
2019–2020	Torres	5	(0)
2020–2021	Foggia	1	(0)
2021	Turris	0	(0)
2021–2022	Tsarsko Selo	3	(0)
2023–2024	Győri ETO	3	(0)
2024–2025	Olbia	25	(1)
2026-2027	SPAL	3	(0)
- * Club domestic league appearances and goals as of 5 November 2026

Matteo Lucarelli (born 10 October 2001) is an Italian professional footballer who plays as a defender for S.P.A.L..

== Club career ==
Lucarelli joined the youth academy of Parma in 2016, the same team his father played for. In 2019, he was loaned to Inter Milan.

=== Torres ===
On 3 September 2019, Lucarelli started his senior career, joining Torres in the first half of the 2019–20 Serie D season before the league suspended play due to the COVID-19 pandemic in Italy.

=== Parma ===
After the loan, he returned to his parent club Parma, where he played in a pre-season match against AC Carpi.

=== Foggia ===
On 12 October 2020, Lucarelli moved to Foggia on loan and made his professional debut in a 4–1 win against Paganese on 23 December 2020.

=== Tsarsko Selo ===
On 1 February 2022, after a brief stint at Turris, Lucarelli joined the First Professional Football League (Bulgaria) side Tsarsko Selo.

=== Győri ETO ===
On 4 November 2023, he signed for the Hungarian club Győri ETO FC. He contributed to securing their return to the top division NB I.

=== Olbia ===
On 23 August 2024, Lucarelli returned to Italy and joined Olbia in Serie D. He scored his first career goal against Puteolana on 27 October 2024.

=== S.P.A.L. ===
On 17 October 2026, Lucarelli moved to S.P.A.L., choosing number 5 jersey.

== Personal life ==
Lucarelli was born in Livorno. His father, Alessandro, is a former footballer who played as a defender in the Serie A, serving as captain of Parma from 2013–2018.

His brother Diego plays for the youth academy of Inter.

His uncle Cristiano Lucarelli is also a former footballer and currently a football manager.

== Honours ==
=== Club ===
Győri ETO

- Nemzeti Bajnokság II: 2023–24
