= Gustavo Busatto =

Brazilian footballer (born 1990)

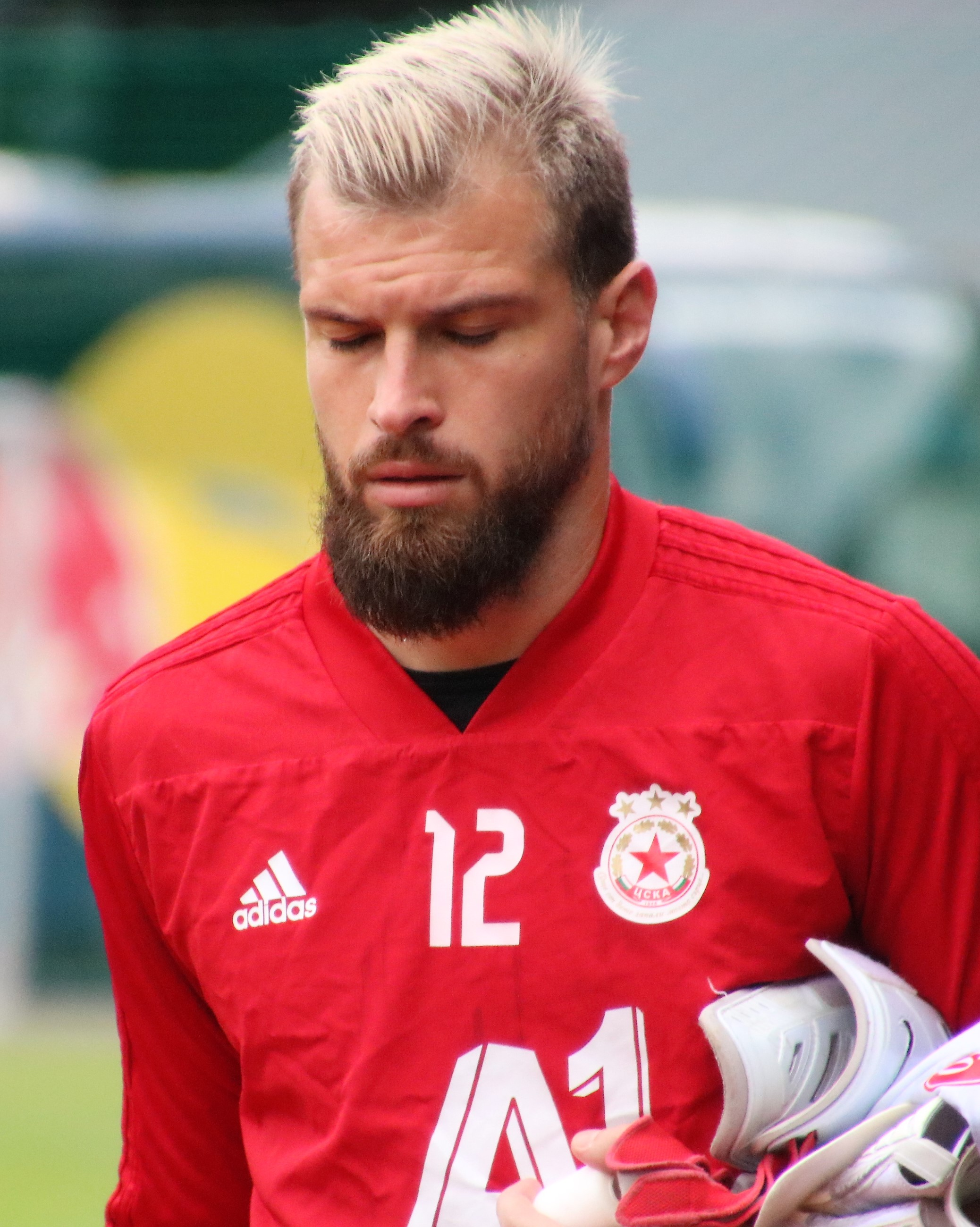
- Busatto in 2019

Personal information
- Full name: Gustavo Busatto
- Date of birth: 23 October 1990 (age 36)
- Place of birth: Arroio do Tigre, Brazil
- Height: 1.90 m (6 ft 3 in)
- Position: Goalkeeper

Team information
- Current team: Cuiabá
- Number: 12

Youth career
- 1998–2010: Grêmio

Senior career*
Years	Team	Apps	(Gls)
2010–2015	Grêmio	1	(0)
2011	→ ASA (loan)	0	(0)
2014	→ Icasa (loan)	19	(0)
2015–2016	América-RN	8	(0)
2015	→ Atlético GO (loan)	0	(0)
2016	Aparecidense	0	(0)
2016–2017	Podbeskidzie	0	(0)
2017	Náutico	2	(0)
2018	Aparecidense	3	(0)
2018	Sampaio Corrêa	10	(0)
2019	Ituano	0	(0)
2019–2026	CSKA Sofia	154	(0)
2024	CSKA Sofia II	1	(0)
2026	Caxias	18	(0)
2026–	Cuiabá	2	(0)
- * Club domestic league appearances and goals as of 18 November 2026

Gustavo Busatto (born 23 October 1990) is a Brazilian professional footballer who plays as a goalkeeper for Cuiabá.

He began his career with Grêmio, from whom he had loan spells with ASA and Icasa before joining América-RN permanently in 2015. Then he spent time with Atlético Goianiense, Aparecidense, Polish club Podbeskidzie Bielsko-Biała, Náutico, Sampaio Corrêa and Ituano.

== Career ==
Busatto began his career in Grêmio's academy, where in 2010 he was promoted to the first team squad of the club to compete in Campeonato Gaúcho. However, he did not play any competitive match.

In 2011, he was loaned to ASA to play in the Campeonato Brasileiro Série B, but also not played any match, returning to the Grêmio.

He made his debut for Grêmio in the 2013 Campeonato Gaúcho, in a 2–0 away win against Esportivo. However, he played only more six matches until 2014. In August of that same year, Busatto was loaned to Icasa until the end of the year to compete in the Série B. His contract with Grêmio also ends at the end of 2014.

Busatto joined Bulgarian club CSKA Sofia in June 2019. He established himself as an undisputed starter for the team. In May 2024, Busatto controversially received a five-match ban following a sending off for dangerous foul play in a league match against Cherno More.

== Career statistics ==
As of 29 October 2024

Appearances and goals by club, season and competition
Club	Season	League			National Cup		Continental		Other		Total	
Club	Season	Division	Apps	Goals	Apps	Goals	Apps	Goals	Apps	Goals	Apps	Goals
Grêmio	2010	Série A	0	0	0	0	0	0	0	0	0	0
Grêmio	2011	Série A	0	0	0	0	0	0	0	0	0	0
Grêmio	2012	Série A	0	0	0	0	0	0	0	0	0	0
Grêmio	2013	Série A	0	0	0	0	0	0	3	0	3	0
Grêmio	2014	Série A	1	0	0	0	0	0	3	0	4	0
Grêmio	Total		1	0	0	0	0	0	6	0	7	0
ASA (loan)	2011	Série B	0	0	0	0	0	0	0	0	0	0
Icasa (loan)	2014	Série B	19	0	0	0	0	0	0	0	19	0
América-RN	2015	Série C	8	0	5	0	0	0	25	0	38	0
Atlético GO (loan)	2015	Série B	0	0	0	0	0	0	0	0	0	0
Aparecidense	2016	Série D	0	0	2	0	0	0	19	0	21	0
Podbeskidzie	2016–17	I liga	0	0	0	0	—		—		0	0
Náutico	2017	Série B	2	0	0	0	0	0	0	0	2	0
Aparecidense	2018	Série D	3	0	2	0	0	0	17	0	22	0
Sampaio Corrêa	2018	Série B	10	0	0	0	0	0	0	0	10	0
Ituano	2019	Série D	0	0	0	0	0	0	0	0	0	0
CSKA Sofia	2019–20	First League	24	0	6	0	0	0	0	0	30	0
CSKA Sofia	2020–21	First League	26	0	5	0	10	0	0	0	41	0
CSKA Sofia	2021–22	First League	23	0	2	0	12	0	1	0	38	0
CSKA Sofia	2022–23	First League	32	0	0	0	6	0	0	0	38	0
CSKA Sofia	2023–24	First League	33	0	4	0	2	0	0	0	39	0
CSKA Sofia	2024–25	First League	10	0	1	0	0	0	0	0	11	0
CSKA Sofia	2025–26	First League	6	0	1	0	0	0	0	0	7	0
CSKA Sofia	Total		154	0	19	0	30	0	1	0	204	0
CSKA Sofia II	2024–25	Second League	1	0	0	0	0	0	0	0	1	0
Career total			198	0	28	0	30	0	68	0	322	0

== Honours ==
Grêmio

- Campeonato Brasileiro Sub-20: 2009
- Campeonato Gaúcho: 2010

CSKA Sofia

- Bulgarian Cup: 2020–21
