= Radoslav Zhivkov =

Bulgarian footballer

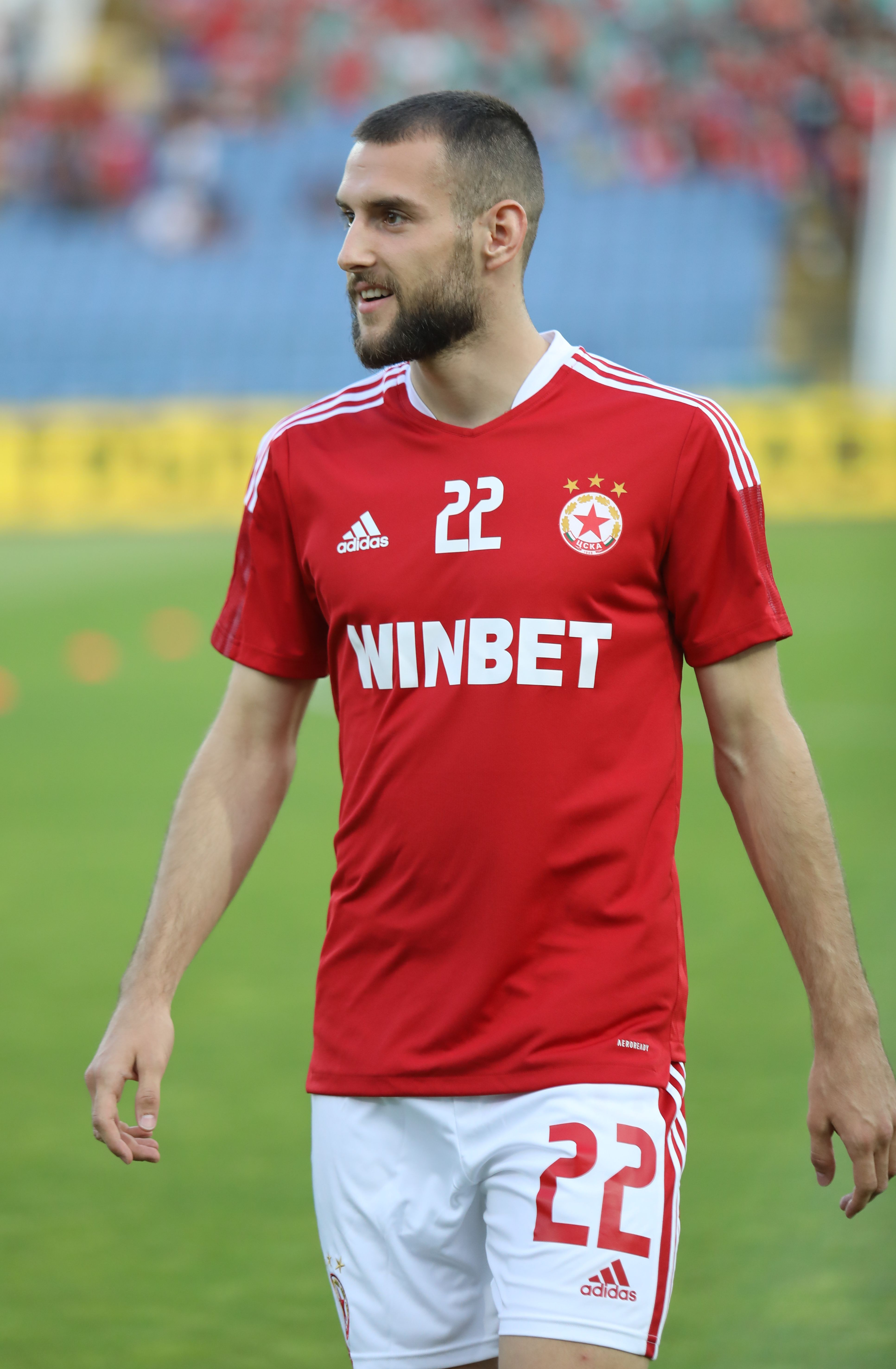
- Zhivkov with CSKA Sofia in 2021

Personal information
- Full name: Radoslav Rumenov Zhivkov
- Date of birth: 27 March 1999 (age 27)
- Place of birth: Sofia, Bulgaria
- Height: 1.82 m (6 ft 0 in)
- Position: Forward

Team information
- Current team: CSKA Sofia II
- Number: 10

Youth career
- –2016: CSKA Sofia

Senior career*
Years	Team	Apps	(Gls)
2016–2017	CSKA Sofia II	5	(0)
2017–2023	CSKA Sofia	4	(0)
2018–2021	→ Litex Lovech (loan)	54	(9)
2021–2022	→ Litex Lovech (loan)	22	(4)
2022	→ Septemvri Sofia (loan)	7	(0)
2023–2024	Sportist Svoge	32	(6)
2024–	CSKA Sofia II	80	(15)

International career^{‡}
2017–2018	Bulgaria U19	0	(0)
- * Club domestic league appearances and goals as of 19:15, 16 November 2026 (UTC) ‡ National team caps and goals as of 17:12, 24 July 2021 (UTC)

Radoslav Zhivkov (Bulgarian: Радослав Руменов Живков; born 27 March 1999) is a Bulgarian professional footballer who plays as a forward for CSKA Sofia II.

== Career ==
Zhivkov joined CSKA Sofia from the youth academy and debuted for the second team in 2016 where he made five appearances. He made his senior debut on 28 July 2018 for Litex Lovech, in a 2–3 league loss over Tsarsko Selo at Gradski stadion. After spending three seasons on loan, he debuted for CSKA Sofia in the 4–0 loss in the Bulgarian Supercup, replacing Jordy Caicedo in the 56th minute.

== Career statistics ==
=== Club ===
As of 15 November 2026

Club	Season	Division	League		Cup		Europe		Other		Total	
Club	Season	Division	Apps	Goals	Apps	Goals	Apps	Goals	Apps	Goals	Apps	Goals
CSKA Sofia II	Second League	2016–17	5	0	–		–		–		5	0
CSKA Sofia	First League	2017–18	0	0	0	0	–		–		0	0
CSKA Sofia	First League	2021–22	1	0	0	0	1	0	1	0	3	0
CSKA Sofia	First League	2022–23	3	0	0	0	1	0	0	0	4	0
CSKA Sofia	Total		4	0	0	0	2	0	1	0	7	0
Litex Lovech (loan)	Second League	2018–19	19	1	1	0	–		–		20	1
Litex Lovech (loan)	Second League	2019–20	11	0	1	0	–		–		12	0
Litex Lovech (loan)	Second League	2020–21	24	8	0	0	–		–		24	8
Litex Lovech (loan)	Second League	2021–22	23	4	0	0	–		–		23	4
Litex Lovech (loan)	Total		77	13	2	0	0	0	0	0	79	13
Septemvri Sofia (loan)	First League	2022–23	7	0	0	0	–		–		7	0
Sportist Svoge	Second League	2023–24	32	6	1	0	–		–		33	6
CSKA Sofia II	Second League	2024–25	35	6	–		–		–		35	6
CSKA Sofia II	Second League	2025–26	29	3	–		–		–		29	3
CSKA Sofia II	Second League	2026–27	16	6	–		–		–		16	6
CSKA Sofia II	Total		80	15	0	0	0	0	0	0	80	15
Career total			205	34	3	0	2	0	1	0	211	34
