= Federico Varela =

Argentine association football player

Fede Varela
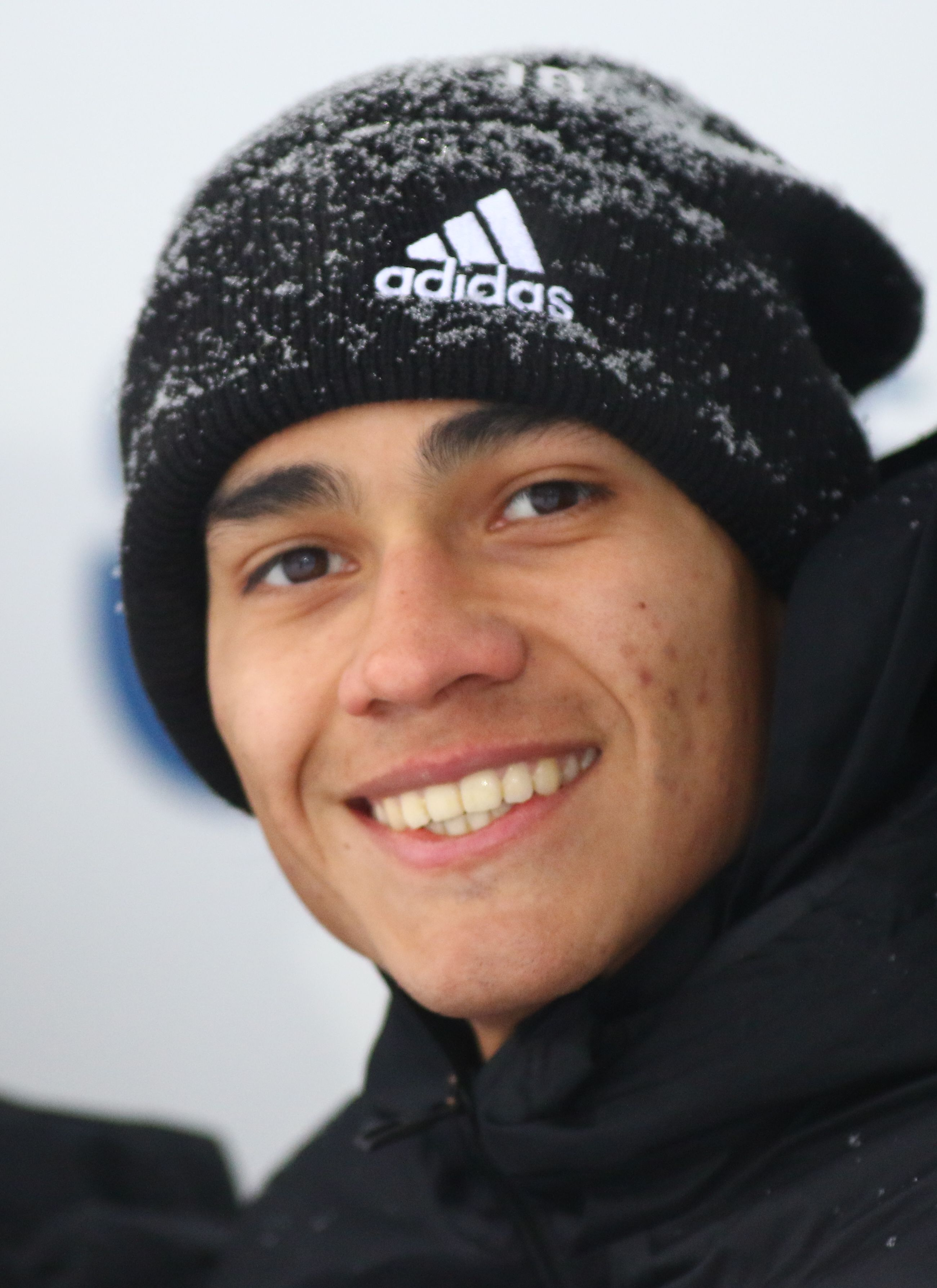
- Varela in 2021

Personal information
- Full name: Federico Nicolás Varela Escudero
- Date of birth: 7 May 1996 (age 30)
- Place of birth: Buenos Aires, Argentina
- Height: 1.74 m (5 ft 9 in)
- Position: Attacking midfielder

Team information
- Current team: Floriana
- Number: 10

Youth career
- Viveiro
- 2012–2014: Celta

Senior career*
| Years | Team | Apps | (Gls) |
| 2014–2015 | Stade Nyonnais | 19 | (3) |
| 2015–2019 | Porto B | 69 | (16) |
| 2018 | → Portimonense (loan) | 12 | (0) |
| 2018–2019 | → Rayo Majadahonda (loan) | 36 | (2) |
| 2019–2020 | Leganés | 1 | (0) |
| 2020 | → Las Palmas (loan) | 17 | (1) |
| 2020–2021 | Denizlispor | 7 | (0) |
| 2021–2022 | CSKA Sofia | 23 | (0) |
| 2023–2024 | Phoenix Rising | 49 | (5) |
| 2025 | Differdange | 15 | (3) |
| 2025– | Floriana | 31 | (7) |
- * Club domestic league appearances and goals as of 6 October 2025

Federico Nicolás Varela Escudero (born 7 May 1996) is an Argentine professional footballer who plays as an attacking midfielder for Floriana in the Maltese Premier League.

== Club career ==
Varela was born in Buenos Aires, but moved to Viveiro, Galicia at early age and started his career at Viveiro CF's youth setup. He subsequently finished his formation with Celta de Vigo, but moved to Stade Nyonnais in August 2014.

Varela made his senior debut on 24 September 2014, starting in a 3–1 home loss against FC Köniz. He scored his first goal for the club on 8 November, but in a 2–1 home defeat to SC Brühl. He left the club after three goals in 21 appearances in all competitions.

On 29 January 2015, Varela joined FC Porto and was immediately assigned to the reserves. He made his debut on 15 August, coming on as a second-half substitute for João Graça in a 2–1 away win against C.D. Santa Clara.

On 21 January 2018, Varela was loaned to Primeira Liga side Portimonense S.C. until the end of the season. He made his debut in the category eight days later, playing the last ten minutes in a 4–1 home routing of Rio Ave F.C..

On 30 July 2018, Varela returned to Spain after agreeing to a one-year loan deal with Segunda División side CF Rayo Majadahonda. The following 4 July, he signed a permanent three-year deal with La Liga side CD Leganés. On 30 December 2019, he joined UD Las Palmas on loan until June.

On 15 September 2020, Varela terminated his contract with Lega. He signed with Phoenix Rising FC on 21 December 2022.

== Career statistics ==
As of 19 May 2022

Appearances and goals by club, season and competition
| Club | Season | League | | | Cup | | Other | | Total | |
| Club | Season | Division | Apps | Goals | Apps | Goals | Apps | Goals | Apps | Goals |
|---|---|---|---|---|---|---|---|---|---|---|
| Stade Nyonnais | 2014–15 | Promotion League | 19 | 3 | 2 | 0 | — | | 21 | 3 |
| Porto B | 2015–16 | LigaPro | 13 | 1 | — | | — | | 13 | 1 |
| Porto B | 2016–17 | LigaPro | 36 | 7 | — | | — | | 36 | 7 |
| Porto B | 2017–18 | LigaPro | 20 | 8 | — | | — | | 20 | 8 |
| Porto B | Total | | 69 | 16 | 0 | 0 | 0 | 0 | 69 | 16 |
| Portimonense (loan) | 2017–18 | Primeira Liga | 12 | 0 | 0 | 0 | 0 | 0 | 12 | 0 |
| Rayo Majadahonda (loan) | 2018–19 | Segunda División B | 36 | 2 | 2 | 1 | — | | 38 | 3 |
| Leganés | 2019–20 | Segunda División B | 0 | 0 | 1 | 0 | — | | 1 | 0 |
| Las Palmas (loan) | 2019–20 | Segunda División B | 17 | 1 | 1 | 0 | — | | 18 | 1 |
| Denizlispor | 2020–21 | Süper Lig | 7 | 0 | 1 | 0 | — | | 8 | 0 |
| CSKA Sofia | 2020–21 | First League | 10 | 0 | 2 | 0 | — | | 12 | 0 |
| CSKA Sofia | 2021–22 | First League | 14 | 0 | 3 | 0 | 4 | 0 | 21 | 0 |
| CSKA Sofia | Total | | 24 | 0 | 5 | 0 | 4 | 0 | 33 | 0 |
| Career total | | | 184 | 22 | 12 | 2 | 4 | 0 | 200 | 23 |

== Honours ==
CSKA Sofia

- Bulgarian Cup: 2020–21
