= Georgi Yomov =

Bulgarian footballer

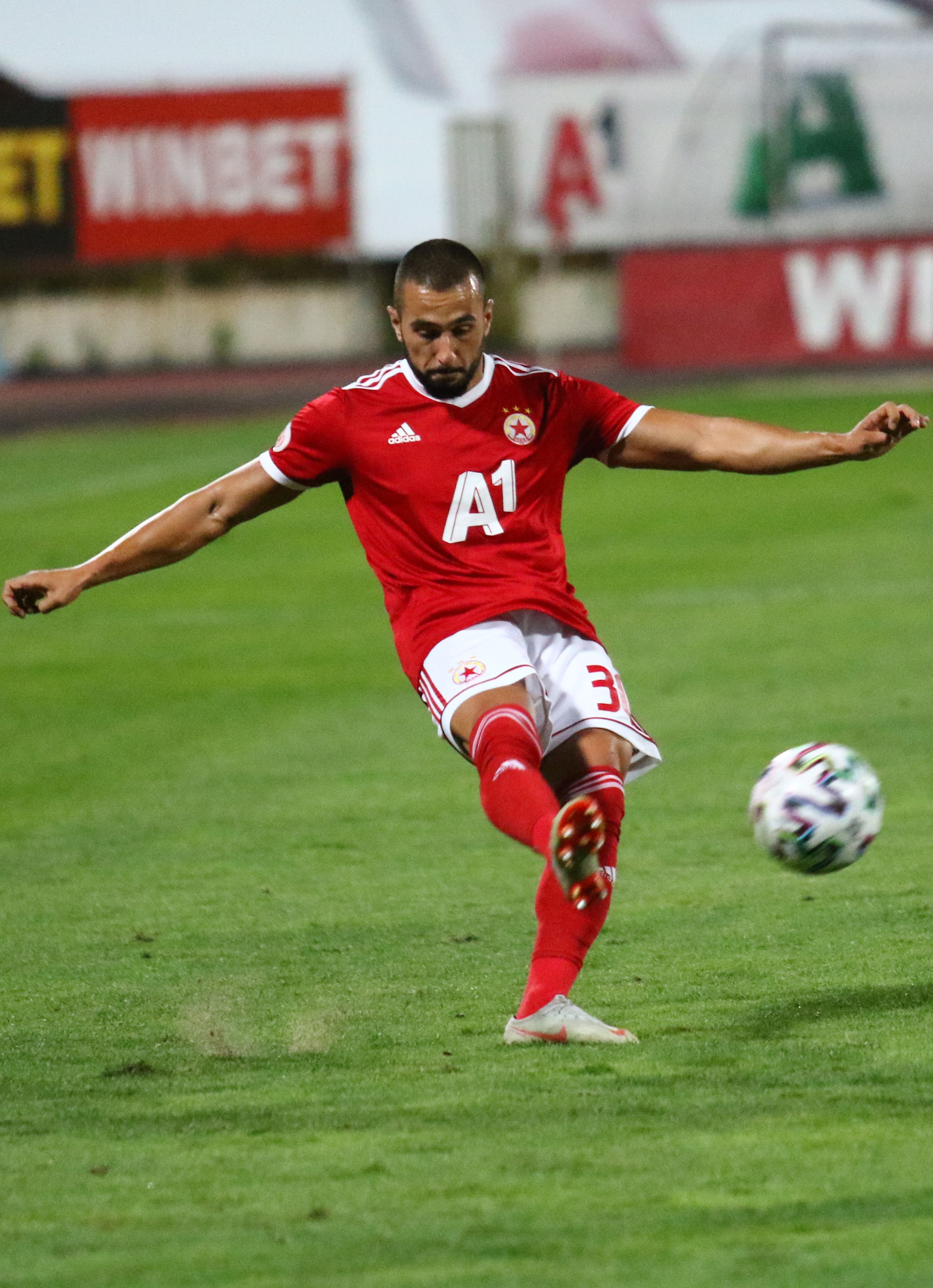

Personal information
- Full name: Georgi Tsetskov Yomov
- Date of birth: 6 July 1997 (age 29)
- Place of birth: Sofia, Bulgaria
- Height: 1.74 m (5 ft 9 in)
- Position: Winger

Team information
- Current team: CSKA Sofia II
- Number: 35

Youth career
- 2006–2015: Levski Sofia
- 2015–2016: Slavia Sofia

Senior career*
Years	Team	Apps	(Gls)
2016–2020	Slavia Sofia	109	(14)
2020–2023	CSKA Sofia	55	(8)
2026–	CSKA Sofia II	7	(1)

International career^{‡}
2012–2014	Bulgaria U17	7	(4)
2016	Bulgaria U19	1	(0)
2017–2018	Bulgaria U21	5	(0)
2020–2022	Bulgaria	10	(2)
- * Club domestic league appearances and goals as of 19:14, 16 November 2026 (UTC) ‡ National team caps and goals as of 18:26, 29 March 2022 (UTC)

Georgi Tsetskov Yomov (Bulgarian: Георги Цецков Йомов; Born 6 July 1997) is a Bulgaria professional footballer who plays as a winger for CSKA Sofia II. He is a grandson of former Levski Sofia footballer Todor Barzov.

Playing youth football for Levski Sofia, Yomov began his professional career at Slavia Sofia, then transferred to CSKA Sofia in the summer of 2020 for a reported fee of €300,000. He made his senior Bulgaria debut in October 2020, having previously represented the nation at various youth levels.

== Career ==
=== Early career ===
Yomov joined Levski Sofia at the age of 9 in 2006 and progressed through the club's academy system. In the summer of 2015 he left the club to sign a professional contract with Slavia Sofia.

=== Slavia Sofia ===
Yomov spent a few months in Slavia's youth academy and was promoted to the senior team in early 2016. He made his first team debut in a 0–0 home draw against Cherno More Varna on 21 February 2016, coming on as a substitute for Yanis Karabelyov. Two months later, on 2 April, Yomov scored his first goal for Slavia against Montana after an impressive individual effort.

For five years with Slavia Yomov made 126 appearances overall, scored 17 goals and won the Bulgarian Cup in 2018.

=== CSKA Sofia ===
On 17 August 2020, Yomov completed a move to CSKA Sofia for a reported fee of €300,000. He made his debut five days later as a 57th-minute substitute for Graham Carey in a 2–1 away win over Botev Vratsa. Yomov scored his first goal for CSKA on 24 September against B36 Tórshavn in the third qualifying round of the Europa League.

In August 2022, Yomov was suspended from playing until 25 November by UEFA after testing positive for a banned substance. On 15 March 2023 it was announced that he will receive a 4-year ban, ending on 25 August 2026. In June 2023 his contract with CSKA ended and it was not renewed.

== International career ==
Yomov was called up to the senior Bulgaria squad for the first time in October 2020 for a UEFA Euro 2020 qualifying play-off against Hungary and a UEFA Nations League matches against Finland and Wales. He made his international debut on 8 October at Vasil Levski National Stadium, replacing Galin Ivanov in the first half against Hungary, and scored in the 89th minute of a 3–1 loss.

== Career statistics ==
=== Club ===
As of 15 November 2026

Club performance			League		Cup		Continental		Other		Total	
Club	League	Season	Apps	Goals	Apps	Goals	Apps	Goals	Apps	Goals	Apps	Goals
Bulgaria			League		Bulgarian Cup		Europe		Other (Note: Includes Bulgarian Supercup matches.)		Total	
Slavia Sofia	A Group	2015–16	13	2	0	0	–		–		13	2
Slavia Sofia	First League	2016–17	25	2	1	0	2	0	4 (Note: Relegation Play-offs)	1	32	3
Slavia Sofia	First League	2017–18	14	2	3	0	–		–		17	2
Slavia Sofia	First League	2018–19	31	4	2	1	4	1	0	0	37	6
Slavia Sofia	First League	2019–20	24	4	1	0	–		–		25	4
Slavia Sofia	First League	2020–21	2	0	0	0	–		–		2	0
Slavia Sofia	Total		109	14	7	1	6	1	4	1	126	17
CSKA Sofia	First League	2020–21	26	0	5	3	10 (Note: UEFA Europa League)	1	–		41	4
CSKA Sofia	First League	2021–22	26	8	6	1	12 (Note: UEFA Conference League)	2	1	0	45	11
CSKA Sofia	First League	2022–23	3	0	0	0	4 (Note: UEFA Conference League)	1	0	0	7	1
CSKA Sofia	Total		56	8	11	4	26	4	1	0	92	16
CSKA Sofia II	Second League	2026–27	7	1	–		–		–		7	1
Career statistics			171	23	18	5	32	5	5	1	226	34

=== International ===
As of match played 29 March 2022

Appearances and goals by national team and year
National team	Year	Apps	Goals
Bulgaria	2020	4	2
Bulgaria	2021	5	0
Bulgaria	2022	1	0
Total		10	2

Scores and results list Bulgaria's goal tally first.

No.	Date	Venue	Opponent	Score	Result	Competition
1.	8 October 2020	Vasil Levski National Stadium, Sofia, Bulgaria	Hungary	1–3	1–3	UEFA Euro 2020 qualifying play-offs
2.	11 November 2020	Vasil Levski National Stadium, Sofia, Bulgaria	Gibraltar	2–0	3–0	Friendly

== Awards ==
Slavia Sofia

- Bulgarian Cup (1): 2017–18

CSKA Sofia

- Bulgarian Cup (1): 2020–21
