= Ivan Turitsov =

Bulgarian footballer

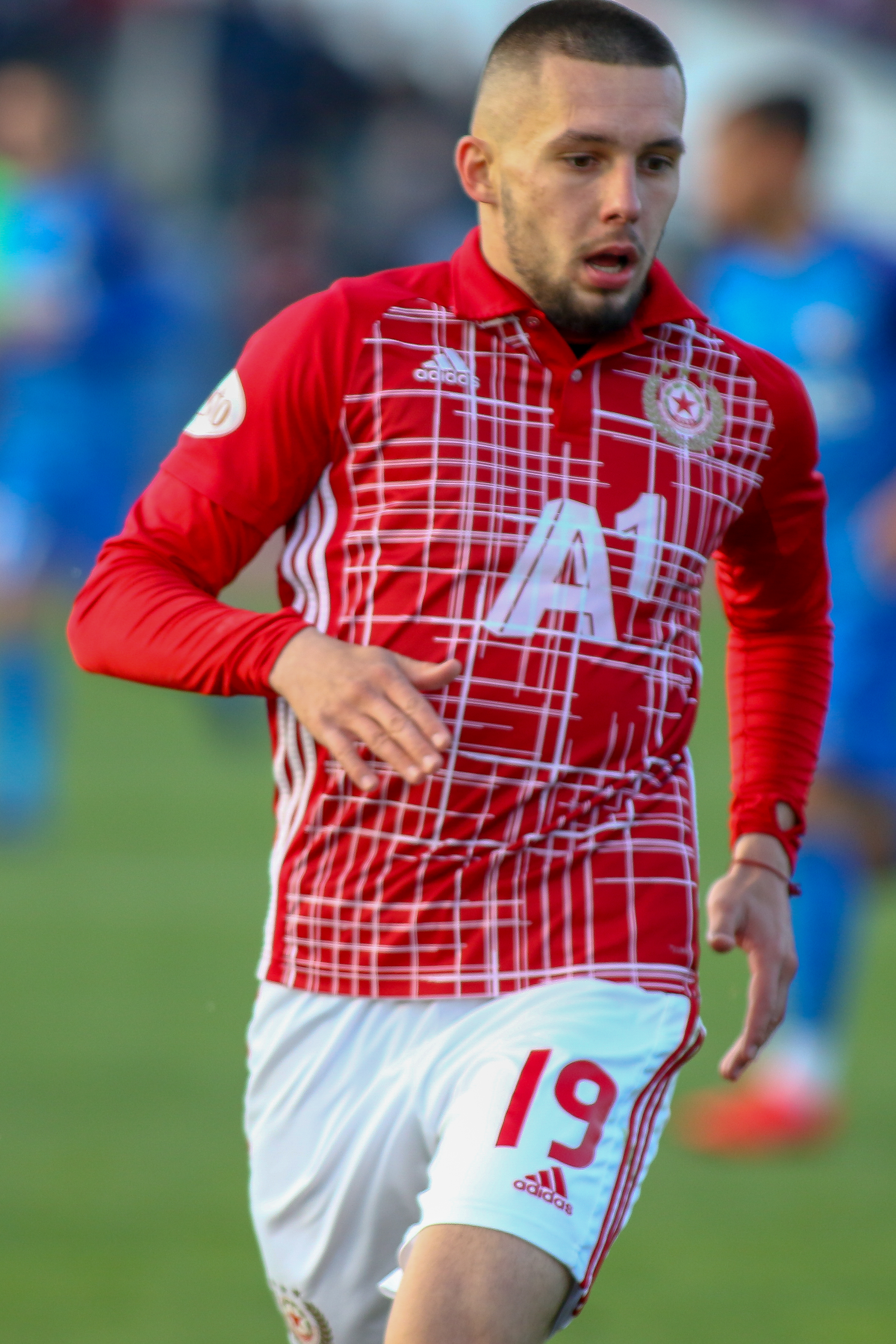

Personal information
- Full name: Ivan Georgiev Turitsov
- Date of birth: 18 July 1999 (age 27)
- Place of birth: Pleven, Bulgaria
- Height: 1.78 m (5 ft 10 in)
- Position: Right back

Team information
- Current team: Dinamo Batumi
- Number: 29

Youth career
- –2016: Litex Lovech
- 2016–2017: CSKA Sofia

Senior career*
Years	Team	Apps	(Gls)
2016–2017	CSKA Sofia II	3	(0)
2016–2026	CSKA Sofia	171	(5)
2017–2018	→ Litex Lovech (loan)	36	(0)
2026–	Dinamo Batumi	11	(0)

International career^{‡}
2017–2018	Bulgaria U19	5	(0)
2019–2020	Bulgaria U21	6	(0)
2020–	Bulgaria	27	(0)
- * Club domestic league appearances and goals as of 11:56, 1 November 2026 (UTC) ‡ National team caps and goals as of 20:22, 3 October 2026 (UTC)

Ivan Georgiev Turitsov (Bulgarian: Иван Георгиев Турицов; born 18 July 1999) is a Bulgarian professional footballer who plays as a defender for Dinamo Batumi.

== Career ==
After progressing through the youth system at Litex Lovech, Turitsov joined CSKA Sofia's academy in July 2016, aged 17. In April 2017, after impressing with the U19 squad, he was promoted to the CSKA Sofia II. On 30 April 2017, Turitsov made his senior debut, playing full 90 minutes in a 2–3 home loss against Etar in the Second League.

In July 2017, Turitsov was loaned back to Litex Lovech to gain experience as a first-team player. He made his debut on 22 July 2017 in a 2–0 home win against Strumska Slava and amassed 36 league appearances over one and a half seasons.

After a successful loan spell with Litex, Turitsov officially returned to CSKA on 15 February 2019. He made his First League debut four days later, in a 2–1 home win against Botev Vratsa. He formerly served as captain of the team.

== International career ==
Turitsov made his debut for the Bulgarian under-21 team on 22 March 2019 in the starting eleven for the friendly against Northern Ireland U21. He earned his first cap for the senior side on 26 February 2020, playing the full 90 minutes of the 0:1 home loss against Belarus in a friendly game.

== Career statistics ==
=== Club ===
As of 28 October 2026

Club	Season	Division	League		Cup		Europe		Other		Total	
Club	Season	Division	Apps	Goals	Apps	Goals	Apps	Goals	Apps	Goals	Apps	Goals
CSKA Sofia II	2016–17	Second League	3	0	–		–		–		3	0
Litex Lovech (loan)	2017–18	Second League	19	0	1	0	–		–		20	0
Litex Lovech (loan)	2018–19	Second League	17	0	0	0	–		–		17	0
Litex Lovech (loan)	Total		36	0	1	0	0	0	0	0	37	0
CSKA Sofia	2018–19	First League	13	0	3	0	0	0	–		16	0
CSKA Sofia	2019–20	First League	19	0	4	0	3	0	–		26	0
CSKA Sofia	2020–21	First League	19	0	5	0	3	0	–		27	0
CSKA Sofia	2021–22	First League	26	0	5	1	10	0	1	0	42	1
CSKA Sofia	2022–23	First League	27	5	1	0	5	1	0	0	33	6
CSKA Sofia	2023–24	First League	23	0	3	0	2	0	1	0	29	0
CSKA Sofia	2024–25	First League	25	0	3	0	–		1	0	29	0
CSKA Sofia	2025–26	First League	19	0	1	0	–		0	0	20	0
CSKA Sofia	Total		171	5	25	1	23	1	3	0	222	7
Dinamo Batumi	2026	Erovnuli Liga	11	0	4	0	–		–		15	0
Career Total			221	5	30	1	23	1	3	0	277	7

=== International ===
As of match played 3 October 2026

Appearances and goals by national team and year
National team	Year	Apps	Goals
Bulgaria	2020	1	0
Bulgaria	2021	7	0
Bulgaria	2022	7	0
Bulgaria	2023	3	0
Bulgaria	2024	1	0
Bulgaria	2025	1	0
Bulgaria	2026	7	0
Total		27	0

== Honours ==
CSKA Sofia

- Bulgarian Cup: 2020–21, 2025–26
