= Junior Nzila =

French footballer (born 2001)

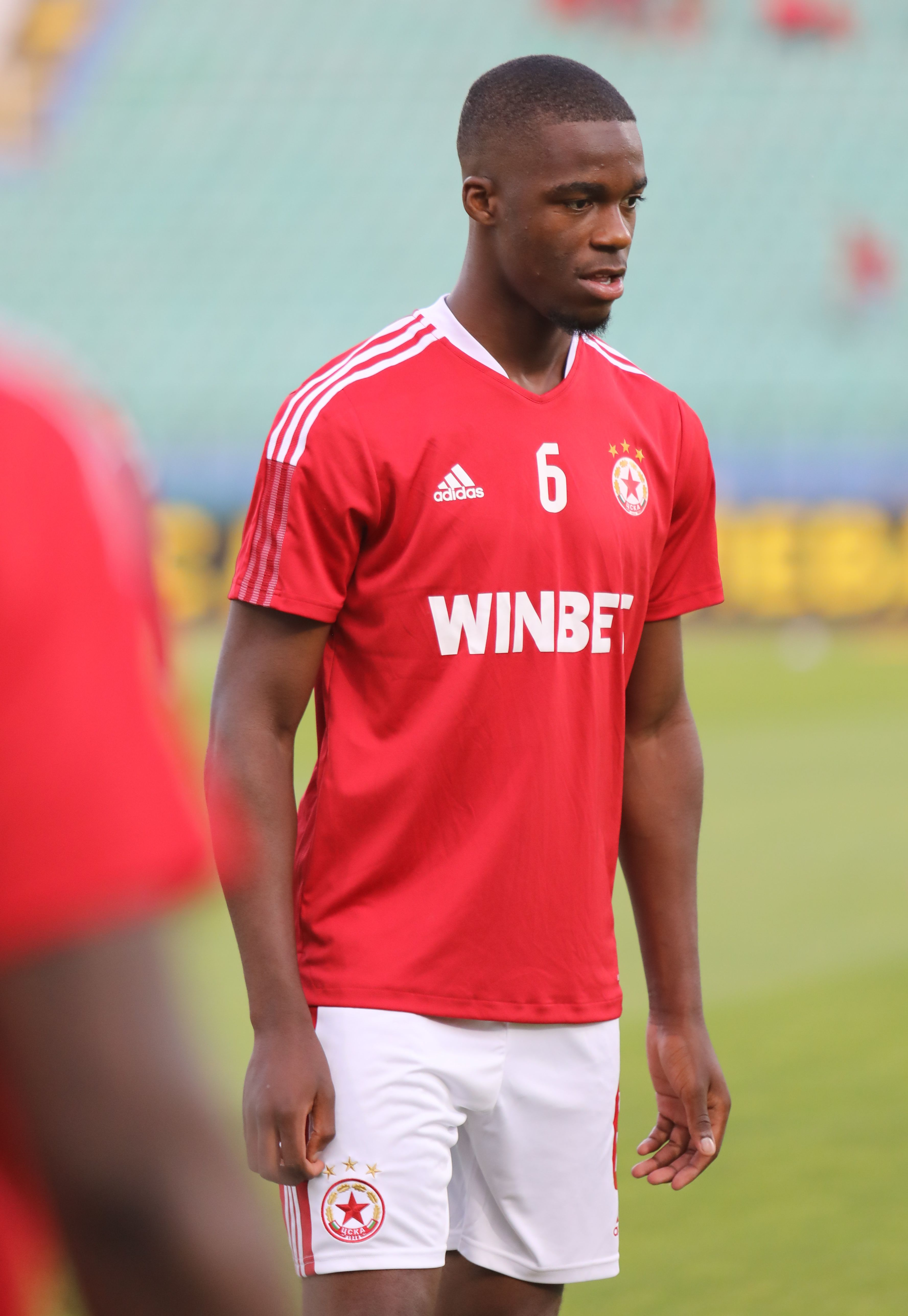
- Nzila with CSKA Sofia in 2021

Personal information
- Full name: Christian Junior Nzila Goma
- Date of birth: 17 April 2001 (age 25)
- Place of birth: France
- Height: 1.91 m (6 ft 3 in)
- Position: Midfielder

Team information
- Current team: Castrumfavara

Senior career*
| Years | Team | Apps | (Gls) |
| 2019–2023 | Chiasso | 11 | (0) |
| 2019–2020 | → Paradiso (loan) | 3 | (0) |
| 2020–2021 | → Napoli Primavera (loan) | 3 | (0) |
| 2021–2022 | → CSKA Sofia (loan) | 4 | (0) |
| 2023–2024 | Royal Cappellen | 22 | (2) |
| 2024–2025 | Union Namur | 27 | (2) |
| 2025– | Castrumfavara | 11 | (0) |
- * Club domestic league appearances and goals as of 18 January 2026

Christian Junior Nzila Goma (born 17 April 2001) is a French footballer who plays as a midfielder for Italian Serie D club Castrumfavara.

== Career ==
In 2019, Nzila signed for Swiss second division side Chiasso. After that, he was sent on loan to FC Paradiso in the Swiss fourth division, where he said, "I had to take the train to go there, it was not easy". In 2020, Nzila was sent on loan to Italian Serie A club Napoli. In 2021, he was sent on loan to CSKA Sofia in Bulgaria. On 17 July 2021, he debuted for CSKA Sofia during a 4–0 loss to Ludogorets.

== Personal life ==
Born in France, Nzila is of Congolese descent.

== Career statistics ==
=== Club ===
As of 4 May 2024

| Club | Season | Division | League | | Cup | | Europe | | Other | | Total | |
| Club | Season | Division | Apps | Goals | Apps | Goals | Apps | Goals | Apps | Goals | Apps | Goals |
|---|---|---|---|---|---|---|---|---|---|---|---|---|
| Chiasso | Challenge League | 2019–20 | 10 | 0 | 0 | 0 | 0 | 0 | 0 | 0 | 10 | 0 |
| Chiasso | Challenge League | 2020–21 | 1 | 0 | 1 | 0 | 0 | 0 | 0 | 0 | 2 | 0 |
| Chiasso | Promotion League | 2022–23 | 0 | 0 | 0 | 0 | 0 | 0 | 0 | 0 | 0 | 0 |
| Chiasso | Total | | 11 | 0 | 1 | 0 | 0 | 0 | 1 | 0 | 12 | 0 |
| FC Paradiso (loan) | Swiss 1. Liga | 2019–20 | 3 | 0 | 0 | 0 | 0 | 0 | 0 | 0 | 3 | 0 |
| Napoli Primavera | Campionato Primavera 2 | 2020–21 | 3 | 0 | 0 | 0 | 0 | 0 | 0 | 0 | 3 | 0 |
| CSKA Sofia | First League | 2021–22 | 4 | 0 | 0 | 0 | 0 | 0 | 1 | 0 | 5 | 0 |
| Royal Cappellen | Belgian National Division 1 | 2023–24 | 21 | 1 | 0 | 0 | 0 | 0 | 0 | 0 | 21 | 1 |
| Career total | | | 42 | 1 | 1 | 0 | 0 | 0 | 1 | 0 | 44 | 1 |
