= 2020–21 PFC CSKA Sofia season =

CSKA Sofia
2020–21 season
- Controlling owner: Grisha Ganchev
- Manager: Stamen Belchev (until 25 October 2020); Daniel Morales (interim) (until 11 November 2020); Bruno Akrapović (until 28 March 2021); Lyuboslav Penev (from 28 March 2021)
- Parva Liga: Third place
- Bulgarian Cup: Winners
- UEFA Europa League: Group stage
- Top goalscorer: League: Ali Sowe (8); All: Ali Sowe (14)
Home colours	Away colours

The 2020–21 season is CSKA Sofia's 72nd season in the Parva Liga (the top flight of Bulgarian football) and their fifth consecutive participation after their administrative relegation in the third division due to mounting financial troubles. In addition to the domestic league, CSKA Sofia participates in this season's edition of the Bulgarian Cup and UEFA Europa League. This article shows player statistics and all matches (official and friendly) that the club will play during the 2020–21 season.

== Players ==
=== Squad information ===
N	Pos.	Nat.	Name	Age	Since	App	Goals	Ends	Transfer fee	Notes
1	GK	(Brazil)	Gustavo Busatto	29	2019	71	0	2022	Undisclosed	
2	DF	(Netherlands)	Jurgen Mattheij	27	2020	40	3	2022	Free	
3	DF	(Brazil)	Geferson	26	2018	89	2	2021	Undisclosed	
4	DF	(Netherlands)	Menno Koch	25	2021	18	2	2024	€500,000	
5	MF	(Argentina)	Federico Varela	23	2021	12	0	2022	Free	
6	DF	(Bulgaria)	Mitko Mitkov	19	2020	11	1	2024	Youth system	
7	MF	(Brazil)	Henrique	26	2018	95	8	2022	Undisclosed	
8	MF	(Republic of Ireland)	Graham Carey	31	2019	67	6	2021	Free	
9	MF	(Venezuela)	Adalberto Peñaranda	23	2020	9	0	2021	Loan	
10	MF	(Bulgaria)	Georgi Yomov	22	2020	41	4	2023	€300,000	
11	DF	(Bulgaria)	Petar Zanev	34	2019	60	1	2021	Free	
14	MF	(Guinea)	Jules Keita	21	2020	21	3	2021	Loan	
15	DF	(France)	Thibaut Vion	26	2020	27	2	2023	Free	
16	DF	(Bulgaria)	Asen Donchev	18	2020	2	0	2024	Youth system	
17	FW	(Ghana)	Bismark Charles	19	2021	16	5	2023	Undisclosed	
18	DF	(Republic of the Congo)	Bradley Mazikou	23	2019	69	1	2022	Undisclosed	
19	DF	(Bulgaria)	Ivan Turitsov	20	2018	69	0	2022	Youth system	
20	MF	(Portugal)	Tiago Rodrigues	28	2017	154	34	2021	Free	
21	MF	(Central African Republic)	Amos Youga	27	2020	42	0	2023	Free	
24	FW	(England)	Jerome Sinclair	23	2020	27	3	2021	Loan	
25	GK	(Bulgaria)	Dimitar Evtimov	26	2020	7	0	2022	Free	
27	FW	(Bulgaria)	Martin Smolenski	17	2019	13	0	2024	Youth system	
28	DF	(Bulgaria)	Plamen Galabov	24	2016	52	1	2022	Free	
29	DF	(Bulgaria)	Aleksandar Buchkov	16	2021	2	0	2024	Youth system	
30	FW	(Ecuador)	Jordy Caicedo	22	2021	19	10	2022	Free	

- Last updated: 26 May 2021
- Source: Players transfer and Wikipedia players' articles
- Ordered by position on pitch.

== Transfers ==
=== In ===
No.	Pos.	Nat.	Name	Age	EU	Moving from	Type	Transfer window	Ends	Transfer fee	Source
2	DF	(Netherlands)	Jurgen Mattheij	27	EU	(Netherlands) Sparta Rotterdam	Free transfer	Summer	2022	Free	cska.bg
21	MF	(Central African Republic)	Amos Youga	27	EU	(France) Le Havre	Free transfer	Summer	2022	Free	cska.bg
13	MF	(Senegal)	Younousse Sankharé	30	EU	(France) Bordeaux	Free transfer	Summer	2022	Free	cska.bg
—	GK	(Bulgaria)	Iliya Shalamanov	17	EU	Youth team	Free transfer	Summer		Free	cska.bg
—	DF	(Bulgaria)	Yoan Baurenski	18	EU	Youth team	Free transfer	Summer		Free	cska.bg
—	DF	(Bulgaria)	Hristiyan Petrov	17	EU	Youth team	Free transfer	Summer		Free	cska.bg
29	MF	(Bulgaria)	Mark-Emilio Papazov	16	EU	Youth team	Free transfer	Summer		Free	cska.bg
—	FW	(Bulgaria)	Daniel Ivanov	18	EU	Youth team	Free transfer	Summer		Free	cska.bg
27	FW	(Bulgaria)	Martin Smolenski	17	EU	Youth team	Free transfer	Summer		Free	cska.bg
5	DF	(Bulgaria)	Angel Lyaskov	22	EU	(Bulgaria) Botev Vratsa	Loan return	Summer		Free	
6	DF	(Bulgaria)	Mitko Mitkov	19	EU	(Bulgaria) Dunav Ruse	Loan return	Summer		Free	
17	FW	(Bulgaria)	Tonislav Yordanov	21	EU	(Bulgaria) Etar Veliko Tarnovo	Loan return	Summer		Free	
25	GK	(Bulgaria)	Dimitar Evtimov	26	EU	(England) Accrington Stanley	Free transfer	Summer		Free	cska.bg
14	MF	(Guinea)	Jules Keita	22	Non-EU	(France) Lens	Loan	Summer	2021	Free	cska.bg
16	DF	(Bulgaria)	Asen Donchev	18	EU	Youth team	Free transfer	Summer		Free	cska.bg
—	FW	(Bulgaria)	Ivan Mitrev	21	EU	Youth team	Free transfer	Summer		Free	cska.bg
30/10	MF	(Bulgaria)	Georgi Yomov	23	EU	(Bulgaria) Slavia Sofia	Transfer	Summer	2023	€300,000	cska.bg
15	DF	(France)	Thibaut Vion	26	EU	(France) Chamois Niortais	Transfer	Summer	2022	Free	cska.bg
17/9	MF	(Venezuela)	Adalberto Peñaranda	23	EU	(England) Watford	Loan	Summer	2021	Free	cska.bg
24	FW	(England)	Jerome Sinclair	24	EU	(England) Watford	Loan	Summer	2021	Free	cska.bg
5	MF	(Argentina)	Federico Varela	24	EU	(Turkey) Denizlispor	Transfer	Winter	2022	Free	cska.bg
30	FW	(Ecuador)	Jordy Caicedo	23	EU	(Brazil) Vitória	Loan	Winter	2022	Free	cska.bg
17	FW	(Ghana)	Bismark Charles	19	Non-EU	(Kosovo) Trepça '89	Transfer	Winter	2024	Undisclosed	cska.bg
4	DF	(Netherlands)	Menno Koch	26	EU	(Belgium) Eupen	Transfer	Winter	2024	€500,000	cska.bg

=== Out ===
No.	Pos.	Nat.	Name	Age	EU	Moving to	Type	Transfer window	Transfer fee	Source
6	MF	(Portugal)	Rúben Pinto	28	EU	(Hungary) Fehérvár	End of contract	Summer	Free	cska.bg
21	MF	(Ghana)	Edwin Gyasi	29	EU	(Turkey) Samsunspor	End of contract	Summer	Free	cska.bg
30	GK	(Lithuania)	Vytautas Černiauskas	31	EU	(Latvia) RFS	Released	Summer	Free	cska.bg
10	FW	(Brazil)	Evandro	23	Non-EU	(Hungary) Fehérvár	Transfer	Summer	€1,000,000	cska.bg
—	GK	(Bulgaria)	Iliya Shalamanov	17	EU	(Bulgaria) Litex Lovech	Loan	Summer	Free	lovechmedia.com
—	DF	(Bulgaria)	Yoan Baurenski	18	EU	(Bulgaria) Litex Lovech	Loan	Summer	Free	lovechmedia.com
—	DF	(Bulgaria)	Hristiyan Petrov	18	EU	(Bulgaria) Litex Lovech	Loan	Summer	Free	
—	FW	(Bulgaria)	Ivan Mitrev	21	EU	(Bulgaria) Litex Lovech	Loan	Summer	Free	lovechmedia.com
5	DF	(Bulgaria)	Angel Lyaskov	22	EU	(Slovenia) Olimpija Ljubljana	Transfer	Summer	Undisclosed	cska.bg
15	MF	(Bulgaria)	Kristiyan Malinov	26	EU	(Belgium) OH Leuven	Transfer	Summer	€500,000	cska.bg
4	DF	(Bulgaria)	Bozhidar Chorbadzhiyski	25	EU	(Poland) Stal Mielec	Released	Winter	Free	cska.bg
9	FW	(Australia)	Tomi Juric	29	EU	(Australia) Adelaide United	Mutual consent	Winter	Free	dsport.bg
10	MF	(Italy)	Stefano Beltrame	27	EU	(Portugal) Marítimo	Mutual consent	Winter	Free	dsport.bg
—	DF	(Portugal)	Nuno Tomás	25	EU	Free agent	Released	Winter	Free	topsport.bg
17	FW	(Bulgaria)	Tonislav Yordanov	22	EU	(Bulgaria) Arda Kardzhali	Transfer	Winter	€50,000	cska.bg
13	MF	(Senegal)	Younousse Sankharé	31	EU	(Greece) Panathinaikos	Transfer	Winter	€250,000	cska.bg
26	DF	(Bulgaria)	Valentin Antov	20	EU	(Italy) Bologna	Loan	Winter	€500,000	cska.bg
23	FW	(Bulgaria)	Ahmed Ahmedov	25	EU	(Azerbaijan) Neftçi	Loan	Winter	Undisclosed	cska.bg
22	FW	(The Gambia)	Ali Sowe	26	EU	(Russia) Rostov	Loan	Winter	€500,000	cska.bg

== Preseason and friendlies ==
Win Draw Loss Fixtures

=== Preseason ===
25 July 2020 Friendly	CSKA	2−0	Pirin	Sofia, Bulgaria
19:00 UTC+3	Henrique 39'; Sowe 41'	Report		Stadium: Stadion Balgarska Armia
Note: The game was abandoned at half-time due to a storm that flooded the pitch

31 July 2020 Friendly	CSKA	2−3	Montana	Sofia, Bulgaria
19:00 UTC+3	Sowe 13'; Antov 44'	Report	Baldzhiyski 35'; Minkov 74'; Hristov 90'	Stadium: Stadion Balgarska Armia; Referee: Petar Grigorov (Sofia)

=== Mid-season ===
9 January 2021 Friendly	CSKA (Bulgaria)	4−0	(Turkey) Alanyaspor II	Alanya, Turkey
13:30 UTC+2	Tiago 9'; Carey 10'; Sowe 43'; Yomov 62' (pen.)	Report		Stadium: Gold City Spor Kompleksi

13 January 2021 Friendly	CSKA (Bulgaria)	0−0	(Poland) Stal Mielec	Alanya, Turkey
15:00 UTC+2		Report		Stadium: Gold City Spor Kompleksi

17 January 2021 Friendly	CSKA	3−0	Septemvri Simitli	Alanya, Turkey
14:00 UTC+2	Sankharé 39'; Smolenski 66', 84'	Report		Stadium: Gold City Spor Kompleksi

25 January 2021 Friendly	CSKA	4−0	Strumska Slava	Pancharevo, Bulgaria
15:00 UTC+2	Sankharé 12'; Antov 21'; Henrique 72'; Ahmedov 87'	Report		Stadium: Sporten kompleks Pancharevo

29 January 2021 Friendly	Pirin	0−0	CSKA	Blagoevgrad, Bulgaria
13:30 UTC+2		Report		Stadium: Stadion Hristo Botev

2 February 2021 Friendly	CSKA	3−1	Botev Vratsa	Sofia, Bulgaria
15:00 UTC+2	Sowe 17'; Tiago 23'; Peñaranda 52'; Yomov (red card) 58'	Report	Genov 10'; N'Diaye (red card) 58'	Stadium: Stadion Balgarska Armia; Attendance: 0 Referee: Volen Chinkov (Sofia)

5 February 2021 Friendly	CSKA	3−1	Lokomotiv Sofia	Sofia, Bulgaria
14:00 UTC+2	Peñaranda 8' (pen.); Tiago 65'; Caicedo 85'	Report	Babaliev 83'	Stadium: Stadion Balgarska Armia; Attendance: 0

=== On-season (spring) ===
27 March 2021 Friendly	CSKA	1−2	Litex	Pancharevo, Bulgaria
12:00 UTC+2	Bismark 80'	Report	Bonev 49', 86'	Stadium: Sporten kompleks Pancharevo; Attendance: 0 Referee: Hristiyana Guteva (Sofia)

== Competitions ==
=== Overview ===
Competition	First match	Last match	Starting round	Final position	Record							
Competition	First match	Last match	Starting round	Final position	Pld	W	D	L	GF	GA	GD	Win %
Parva Liga	7 August 2020	26 May 2021	Matchday 1	3rd place	31	17	8	6	46	24	+22	54.84
Bulgarian Cup	14 November 2020	19 May 2021	First round	Winner	6	5	1	0	16	3	+13	83.33
UEFA Europa League	27 August 2020	10 December 2020	First qualifying round	Group stage	10	5	2	3	13	10	+3	50.00
Total					47	27	11	9	75	37	+38	57.45

Last updated: 26 May 2021
Source: Competitions

=== Parva Liga ===
==== Regular Stage ====
===== League table =====
Pos	Team	Pld	W	D	L	GF	GA	GD	Pts	Qualification
1	Ludogorets Razgrad	26	20	4	2	59	18	+41	64	Qualification for the Championship group
2	Lokomotiv Plovdiv	26	15	7	4	41	19	+22	52	Qualification for the Championship group
3	CSKA Sofia	26	14	8	4	39	20	+19	50	Qualification for the Championship group
4	Arda	26	12	9	5	36	29	+7	45	Qualification for the Championship group
5	CSKA 1948	26	10	8	8	34	30	+4	38	Qualification for the Championship group

Source: Soccerway, Bulgarian Football
Rules for classification: 1) Points; 2) Head-to-head points; 3) Head-to-head goal difference; 4) Head-to-head goals scored; 5) Head-to-head away goals scored (only if two teams); 6) Goal difference; 7) Goals scored; 8) Fairplay ranking; 9) Draw.

===== Results summary =====
Overall								Home						Away					
Pld	W	D	L	GF	GA	GD	Pts	W	D	L	GF	GA	GD	W	D	L	GF	GA	GD
26	14	8	4	39	20	+19	50	9	4	0	21	6	+15	5	4	4	18	14	+4

Last updated: 25 April 2021.
Source: See results

===== Results by round =====
Round	1	2	3	4	5	6	7	8	9	10	11	12	13	14	15	16	17	18	19	20	21	22	23	24	25	26
Ground	A	H	A	H	A	H	A	A	H	A	H	A	H	H	A	H	A	H	A	H	H	A	H	A	H	A
Result	D	W	W	W	D	D	L	D	D	D	W	W	W	W	W	W	W	W	L	D	W	L	D	L	W	W
Position/	7	4	2	1	3	4	5	4	4	5	5	3	3	4	4	3	2	2	2	2	2	3	3	3	3	3

Updated to match(es) played on 25 April 2021. Source: See Results
A = Away; H = Home; W = Win; D = Draw; L = Loss

===== Results =====
7 August 2020 1	CSKA 1948	2−2	CSKA	Sofia
20:00 UTC+3	Kamburov 18'; Mladenov 33'; Shopov (yellow card) 49'; S. Aleksandrov (yellow card) 53'; Atanasov (yellow card) 56'; Vasilev (yellow card) 89'; Topuzov (yellow card) 90+2'	Report	Antov 45+4'; Sowe 52'; Ahmedov (yellow card) 90'	Stadium: Natsionalen stadion Vasil Levski; Attendance: 1,500; Referee: Stanislav Todorov (Shumen); Man of the Match: Martin Kamburov
Note: On 9 July 2020 the Ministry of Health announced that the stadiums are not allowed to host spectators due to a recent spike of COVID-19-related infections in Bulgaria. On 31 July 2020 the Ministry for Sport and Youth confirmed the extension of these provisions until 31 August 2020. Yet, on 5 August 2020 the Ministry for Sport and Youth reversed its decision by allowing stadiums to host up to 50% of its capacity, but no more than 1,000 spectators per block.

16 August 2020 2	CSKA	2−1	Botev Plovdiv	Sofia
20:00 UTC+3	Sankharé 23'; Antov (yellow card) 35'; Tiago (yellow card) 89'; Beltrame 90+2', (yellow card) 90+3'	Report	Shokolarov (yellow card) 11'; Vutov (yellow card) 27'; Espinosa 60'; Pedroso (yellow card) 76'; Baltanov (yellow card) 80'	Stadium: Stadion Balgarska Armia; Attendance: 1,453; Referee: Georgi Dimitrov (Sofia); Man of the Match: Valentin Antov
Note: According to a regulation, issued on 5 August 2020 by the Ministry for Sport and Youth, stadiums are allowed to host up to 50% of its capacity, but no more than 1,000 spectators per block.

22 August 2020 3	Botev Vratsa	1−2	CSKA	Vratsa
18:45 UTC+3	Ivaylov (yellow card) 11'; Kerchev (yellow card) 38'; Genov 45', (yellow card) 87'; Gadzhev (yellow card) 67'	Report	Henrique 17'; Youga (yellow card) 56'; Sowe 72'; Mattheij (yellow card) 77'; Beltrame (yellow card) 90+4'	Stadium: Stadion Hristo Botev; Attendance: 1,000; Referee: Georgi Kabakov (Plovdiv); Man of the Match: Ali Sowe
Note: According to a regulation, issued on 5 August 2020 by the Ministry for Sport and Youth, stadiums are allowed to host up to 50% of its capacity, but no more than 1,000 spectators per block.

30 August 2020 4	CSKA	1−0	Slavia	Sofia
21:00 UTC+3	Antov (yellow card) 22'; Sankharé (yellow card) 42' (yellow-red card) 44'; Bengyuzov 90+2' (o.g.)	Report	F. Krastev (yellow card) 55'; Tombak (yellow card) 60'; K. Krastev (yellow card) 62'; Hristov (yellow card) 66'; Popadiyn (yellow card) 89'	Stadium: Stadion Balgarska Armia; Attendance: 1,000; Referee: Petar Kirilov (Dobrich); Man of the Match: Bradley Mazikou
Note: According to a regulation, issued on 5 August 2020 by the Ministry for Sport and Youth, stadiums are allowed to host up to 50% of its capacity, but no more than 1,000 spectators per block.

12 September 2020 5	Cherno More	1−1	CSKA	Varna
18:45 UTC+3	Coureur 36'; Panayotov (penalty missed) 48'; Dimov (yellow card) 49' (yellow-red card) 62'; Isa (yellow card) 86'; G. Georgiev (yellow card) 90+5'	Report	Geferson (yellow card) 33'; Galabov (yellow card) 46'; Antov (yellow card) 82'; Juric 88'	Stadium: Stadion Ticha; Attendance: 4,000; Referee: Stanislav Todorov (Shumen); Man of the Match: Tomi Juric
Note: According to a regulation, issued on 5 August 2020 by the Ministry for Sport and Youth, stadiums are allowed to host up to 50% of its capacity, but no more than 1,000 spectators per block. On 1 September 2020 the Ministry of Sport and Youth extended the validity of this regulation until 30 September 2020.

20 September 2020 6	CSKA	2−2	Ludogorets	Sofia
20:30 UTC+3	Keita (yellow card) 27', (goal) 71'; Yomov (yellow card) 56'; Sankharé 74'; Carey (yellow card) 80'	Report	Santana 11', (yellow card) 81'; Grigore (yellow card) 23'; Cicinho (yellow card) 34'; Yankov (yellow card) 63'; Manu (yellow card) 63'; Higinio 83'; Stoyanov (yellow card) 89'	Stadium: Stadion Balgarska Armia; Attendance: 3,000; Referee: Georgi Kabakov (Plovdiv); Man of the Match: Jules Keita
Note: According to a regulation, issued on 5 August 2020 by the Ministry for Sport and Youth, stadiums are allowed to host up to 50% of its capacity, but no more than 1,000 spectators per block. On 1 September 2020 the Ministry of Sport and Youth extended the validity of this regulation until 30 September 2020.

27 September 2020 7	Lokomotiv	2−1	CSKA	Plovdiv
21:00 UTC+3	Mattheij 32' (o.g.); Minchev (yellow card) 35'; Tsvetanov 38'; Petrović (yellow card) 44'	Report	Mazikou (yellow card) 7'; Keita (yellow card) 36'; Tiago (yellow card) 64', (goal) 69'; Galabov (yellow card) 67'; Ahmedov (yellow card) 74'	Stadium: Stadion Lokomotiv; Attendance: 3,000; Referee: Nikolay Yordanov (Sofia); Man of the Match: Momchil Tsvetanov
Note: According to a regulation, issued on 5 August 2020 by the Ministry for Sport and Youth, stadiums are allowed to host up to 50% of its capacity, but no more than 1,000 spectators per block. On 1 September 2020 the Ministry of Sport and Youth extended the validity of this regulation until 30 September 2020.

4 October 2020 8	Etar	2−2	CSKA	Veliko Tarnovo
20:15 UTC+3	Angelov 12' (pen.); Pehlivanov (yellow card) 13' (yellow-red card) 90+2'; Ferreira 45'; Kupenov (yellow card) 53'; Stanev (yellow card) 56'; Gospodinov (yellow card) 80'; Puertas (yellow card) 90+6'	Report	Carey (yellow card) 37'; Tiago 62'; Yomov (yellow card) 67'; Ahmedov (yellow card) 87', (goal) 90+3'	Stadium: Stadion Ivaylo; Attendance: 3,000; Referee: Vladimir Valkov (Plovdiv); Man of the Match: Tiago Rodrigues
Note: According to a regulation, issued on 5 August 2020 by the Ministry for Sport and Youth, stadiums are allowed to host up to 50% of its capacity, but no more than 1,000 spectators per block. On 1 September 2020 the Ministry of Sport and Youth extended the validity of this regulation until 30 September 2020. A further extension until 31 October 2020 was granted by the Ministry of Sport and Youth on 30 September 2020.

17 October 2020 9	CSKA	1−1	Beroe	Sofia
20:15 UTC+3	Antov 54'	Report	Makouta (yellow card) 24', (goal) 48'; Mézague (yellow card) 61'; Vasilev (yellow card) 90+6'	Stadium: Stadion Balgarska Armia; Attendance: 2,500; Referee: Dragomir Draganov (Varna); Man of the Match: Valentin Antov
Note: According to a regulation, issued on 5 August 2020 by the Ministry for Sport and Youth, stadiums are allowed to host up to 50% of its capacity, but no more than 1,000 spectators per block. On 1 September 2020 the Ministry of Sport and Youth extended the validity of this regulation until 30 September 2020. A further extension until 31 October 2020 was granted by the Ministry of Sport and Youth on 30 September 2020.

25 October 2020 10	Arda	1−1	CSKA	Kardzhali
17:45 UTC+2	Sulaka (yellow card) 32'; Ganev (yellow card) 56'; Kokonov (yellow card) 64'; Kovachev 73'; Rumenov (yellow card) 89'; Karadzhov (yellow card) 90+4'	Report	Youga (yellow card) 58'; Sinclair 84'	Stadium: Arena Arda; Attendance: 1,000; Referee: Radoslav Gidzhenov (Plovdiv); Man of the Match: Jerome Sinclair
Note: According to a regulation, issued on 5 August 2020 by the Ministry for Sport and Youth, stadiums are allowed to host up to 50% of its capacity, but no more than 1,000 spectators per block. On 1 September 2020 the Ministry of Sport and Youth extended the validity of this regulation until 30 September 2020. A further extension until 31 October 2020 was granted by the Ministry of Sport and Youth on 30 September 2020.

1 November 2020 11	CSKA	1−0	Tsarsko Selo	Sofia
16:45 UTC+2	Yomov (yellow card) 79'; Sankharé 90'; Evtimov (yellow card) 90+4'	Report	A. Georgiev (yellow card) 3'; Bandalovski (yellow card) 78'; Baltanov (yellow card) 85'; Vasev (yellow card) 89'; Daskalov (red card) 90+5'	Stadium: Stadion Balgarska Armia; Attendance: 0 Referee: Stanimir Trenchev (Sofia); Man of the Match: Dimitar Evtimov
Note: On 27 October 2020 the Ministry of Health announced that stadiums are not allowed to host spectators for the following two weeks due to a recent spike of COVID-19-related infections in Bulgaria.

8 November 2020 12	Montana	1−2	CSKA	Montana
15:00 UTC+2	Kiki (yellow card) 52'; Kamenov (yellow card) 60'; Minkov 78'	Report	Senhadji 8' (o.g.); Mazikou (yellow card) 63'; Sowe 76'; Youga (yellow card) 88'	Stadium: Stadion Ogosta; Attendance: 0 Referee: Dragomir Draganov (Varna); Man of the Match: Ali Sowe
Note: On 27 October 2020 the Ministry of Health announced that stadiums are not allowed to host spectators for the following two weeks due to a recent spike of COVID-19-related infections in Bulgaria.

29 November 2020 14	CSKA	2−0	CSKA 1948	Sofia
19:00 UTC+2	Sowe 18'; Zanev (yellow card) 21'; Yomov (yellow card) 41'; Youga (yellow card) 68'; Sankharé (yellow card) 82'; Marin 83' (o.g.)	Report	Bastunov (yellow card) 34'	Stadium: Stadion Balgarska Armia; Attendance: 0 Referee: Petar Kirilov (Dobrich); Man of the Match: Ali Sowe
Note: On 11 November 2020 the Ministry of Health announced that stadiums are not allowed to host spectators until 30 November due to the ongoing increase of COVID-19-related infections in Bulgaria.

6 December 2020 15	Botev Plovdiv	0−3	CSKA	Plovdiv
14:30 UTC+2	Johnathan (yellow card) 60'; Shokolarov (yellow card) 90'	Report	Vion 20', (yellow card) 45'; Tiago (yellow card) 28'; Sowe 58'; Mazikou 68'; Sankharé (yellow card) 90'	Stadium: Futbolen kompleks Botev 1912; Attendance: 0 Referee: Nikolay Yordanov (Sofia); Man of the Match: Ali Sowe
Note: On 25 November 2020 the Ministry of Health announced that stadiums are not allowed to host spectators for further four weeks due to an ongoing spike of COVID-19-related infections in Bulgaria.

13 December 2020 16	CSKA	2−1	Botev Vratsa	Sofia
12:30 UTC+2	Kerchev 17' (o.g.); Sowe 58'	Report	Gadzhev (yellow card) 43'; Genov 63'; Dobrev (yellow card) 66'	Stadium: Stadion Balgarska Armia; Attendance: 0 Referee: Georgi Kabakov (Plovdiv); Man of the Match: Petar Zanev
Note: On 25 November 2020 the Ministry of Health announced that stadiums are not allowed to host spectators for further four weeks due to an ongoing spike of COVID-19-related infections in Bulgaria.

18 December 2020 13	CSKA	1−0	Levski	Sofia
18:00 UTC+2	Sowe 20'; Youga (yellow card) 29' (yellow-red card) 74'; Tiago (penalty missed) 34'; Vion (yellow card) 36'; Mazikou (yellow card) 46'; Mattheij (yellow card) 60'; Evtimov (yellow card) 62'; Antov (yellow card) 69'	Report	M. D. Petkov (yellow card) 32'; Stojanovič (yellow card) 36'; Paulinho (yellow card) 42'; Aleksandrov (yellow card) 90'; Bojinov (yellow card) 90+4'	Stadium: Natsionalen stadion Vasil Levski; Attendance: 0 Referee: Nikola Popov (Sofia); Man of the Match: Ali Sowe
Note: On 11 November 2020 the Ministry of Health announced that stadiums are not allowed to host spectators until 30 November due to the ongoing increase of COVID-19-related infections in Bulgaria. The game was originally scheduled for 21 November 2020, but because of a case of a COVID-19-related outbreak within the Levski squad, having more than 10 players testing positively, the Bulgarian Football Union decided on 20 November 2020 to postpone the game until further notice. On 25 November 2020 the BFU rescheduled the game for 18 December. The game will still be played behind closed doors due to the introduction of further measures by the Ministry of Health due to an ongoing spike of COVID-19-related infections in Bulgaria.

13 February 2021 17	Slavia	0−1	CSKA	Sofia
17:30 UTC+2	Ghandri (yellow card) 36'; Stoev (yellow card) 56'; Sorakov (yellow card) 69'; Makrillos (yellow card) 83'	Report	Sowe 24'; Mazikou (yellow card) 83'; Busatto (yellow card) 90+3'	Stadium: Stadion Slavia; Attendance: 0 Referee: Nikola Popov (Sofia); Man of the Match: Ali Sowe
Note: On 26 January 2021 the Ministry of Health announced that stadiums are not allowed to host spectators until 30 April 2021 due to an ongoing COVID-19 pandemic in Bulgaria in Bulgaria.

20 February 2021 18	CSKA	1−0	Cherno More	Sofia
17:30 UTC+2	Galabov (yellow card) 27'; Peñaranda (yellow card) 33'; Mattheij (yellow card) 36'; Vion (yellow card) 48'; Caicedo 68'; Tiago (yellow card) 74'	Report	Dimov (yellow card) 9'; Popov (yellow card) 26'; Álvarez (yellow card) 64'	Stadium: Stadion Balgarska Armia; Attendance: 0 Referee: Radoslav Gidzhenov (Plovdiv); Man of the Match: Jordy Caicedo
Note: On 26 January 2021 the Ministry of Health announced that stadiums are not allowed to host spectators until 30 April 2021 due to an ongoing COVID-19 pandemic in Bulgaria in Bulgaria.

27 February 2021 19	Ludogorets	1−0	CSKA	Razgrad
15:00 UTC+2	Tekpetey 4'; Anicet (yellow card) 40'; Ikoko (yellow card) 74'; Iliev (yellow card) 90+1'	Report	Zanev (yellow card) 17'; Sinclair (yellow card) 67'; Koch (yellow card) 86'; Mattheij (yellow card) 87'; Youga (yellow card) 90+4'	Stadium: Huvepharma Arena; Attendance: 0 Referee: Dragomir Draganov (Varna); Man of the Match: Bernard Tekpetey
Note: On 26 January 2021 the Ministry of Health announced that stadiums are not allowed to host spectators until 30 April 2021 due to an ongoing COVID-19 pandemic in Bulgaria in Bulgaria.

6 March 2021 20	CSKA	0−0	Lokomotiv	Sofia
17:30 UTC+2	Caicedo (yellow card) 13'	Report	Vitanov (yellow card) 12'; Umarbayev (yellow card) 38'; Ilić (yellow card) 62'; Gomis (yellow card) 86'; Minchev (yellow card) 87'	Stadium: Stadion Balgarska Armia; Attendance: 0 Referee: Valentin Zhelezov (Burgas); Man of the Match: Dimitar Iliev
Note: On 26 January 2021 the Ministry of Health announced that stadiums are not allowed to host spectators until 30 April 2021 due to an ongoing COVID-19 pandemic in Bulgaria in Bulgaria.

14 March 2021 21	CSKA	1−0	Etar	Sofia
17:00 UTC+2	Yomov (penalty missed) 24'; Henrique 61'; Bismark (yellow card) 81'	Report	Iliev (yellow card) 23'; Córdoba (yellow card) 76'; Pehlivanov (yellow card) 88'	Stadium: Stadion Balgarska Armia; Attendance: 0 Referee: Georgi Ivanov (Sofia); Man of the Match: Henrique
Note: On 26 January 2021 the Ministry of Health announced that stadiums are not allowed to host spectators until 30 April 2021 due to an ongoing COVID-19 pandemic in Bulgaria in Bulgaria.

21 March 2021 22	Beroe	1−0	CSKA	Stara Zagora
14:15 UTC+2	Angelov (yellow card) 23'; Hassani (yellow card) 85'; Kamburov 87' (pen.)	Report	Zanev (yellow card) 43'; Caicedo (yellow card) 51'; Turitsov (yellow card) 88'	Stadium: Stadion Beroe; Attendance: 0 Referee: Dragomir Draganov (Varna); Man of the Match: Martin Kamburov
Note: On 26 January 2021 the Ministry of Health announced that stadiums are not allowed to host spectators until 30 April 2021 due to an ongoing COVID-19 pandemic in Bulgaria in Bulgaria.

10 April 2021 23	CSKA	1−1	Arda	Sofia
20:00 UTC+3	Caicedo 68'; Mitkov (yellow card) 79'; Zanev (yellow card) 90+3'	Report	Georgiev (yellow card) 70'; Yordanov 90+4' (pen.)	Stadium: Stadion Balgarska Armia; Attendance: 0 Referee: Vasimir El-Hatib (Sofia); Man of the Match: Tonislav Yordanov
Note: On 26 January 2021 the Ministry of Health announced that stadiums are not allowed to host spectators until 30 April 2021 due to an ongoing COVID-19 pandemic in Bulgaria in Bulgaria. The game has been originally planned to be played between 2 and 5 April, but on 2 March 2021 it has been moved for the period between 9 and 12 April due to a round of rescheduling related to the 2021 Bulgarian parliamentary election.

18 April 2021 24	Tsarsko Selo	2−1	CSKA	Sofia
18:30 UTC+3	Kostadinov 8' (pen.); Daskalov (yellow card) 26', (goal) 90'; Markov (yellow card) 64'; Baltanov (yellow card) 73'; Popadiyn (yellow card) 90+2'	Report	Zanev (yellow card) 7' (yellow-red card) 34'; Bismark 75'; Youga (yellow card) 89'; Yomov (yellow card) 90+5'	Stadium: Sporten kompleks Tsarsko Selo; Attendance: 0 Referee: Radoslav Gidzhenov (Plovdiv); Man of the Match: Reyan Daskalov
Note: On 26 January 2021 the Ministry of Health announced that stadiums are not allowed to host spectators until 30 April 2021 due to an ongoing COVID-19 pandemic in Bulgaria in Bulgaria. The game has been originally planned to be played between 9 and 12 April, but on 2 March 2021 it has been moved for the period between 15 and 18 April due to a round of rescheduling related to the 2021 Bulgarian parliamentary election.

21 April 2021 25	CSKA	6−0	Montana	Sofia
18:15 UTC+3	Koch 13'; Vion 36'; Carey 51'; Mattheij 75'; Caicedo 90' (pen.), 90+1'	Report	Minkov (yellow card) 53'; Terziev (yellow card) 56'; Aytov (yellow card) 80'; Senhadji (yellow card) 89'	Stadium: Stadion Balgarska Armia; Attendance: 0 Referee: Dimo Dimov (Sliven); Man of the Match: Menno Koch
Note: On 26 January 2021 the Ministry of Health announced that stadiums are not allowed to host spectators until 30 April 2021 due to an ongoing COVID-19 pandemic in Bulgaria in Bulgaria. The game has been originally planned to be played on 14 April, but on 2 March 2021 it has been moved for the period between 20 and 22 April due to a round of rescheduling related to the 2021 Bulgarian parliamentary election.

25 April 2021 26	Levski	0−2	CSKA	Sofia
17:00 UTC+3	M. D. Petkov (yellow card) 27'; Aleksandrov (yellow card) 71'; Mihajlović (yellow card) 72'; Naydenov (yellow card) 75'; I. Dimitrov (red card) 90+2'	Report	Keita 14'; Caicedo 37'; Koch (yellow card) 54'; Carey (yellow card) 74'	Stadium: Natsionalen stadion Vasil Levski; Attendance: 4,000; Referee: Ivaylo Stoyanov (Petrich); Man of the Match: Federico Varela
Note: On 26 January 2021 the Ministry of Health announced that stadiums are not allowed to host spectators until 30 April 2021 due to an ongoing COVID-19 pandemic in Bulgaria in Bulgaria. On 23 April 2021 the Ministry for Health revised its decision by allowing stadiums to host up to 30% of its capacity, but no more than 1,000 spectators per block. The game has been originally planned to be played between 16 and 19 April, but on 2 March 2021 it has been moved for the period between 23 and 26 April due to a round of rescheduling related to the 2021 Bulgarian parliamentary election.

==== Championship round ====
===== League table =====
Pos	Team	Pld	W	D	L	GF	GA	GD	Pts	Qualification
1	Ludogorets Razgrad (C)	31	22	4	5	69	29	+40	70	Qualification for the Champions League first qualifying round
2	Lokomotiv Plovdiv	31	17	10	4	48	23	+25	61	Qualification for the Europa Conference League second qualifying round (Note: CSKA Sofia qualified for the Europa Conference League second qualifying round by winning the 2020–21 Bulgarian Cup.)
3	CSKA Sofia	31	17	8	6	46	24	+22	59	Qualification for the Europa Conference League second qualifying round
4	Arda (O)	31	13	11	7	42	37	+5	50	Qualification for the Europa Conference League play-off
5	CSKA 1948	31	12	11	8	41	34	+7	47	
6	Beroe	31	10	9	12	42	38	+4	39	

Source: Soccerway
Rules for classification: 1) Points; 2) Head-to-head points; 3) Head-to-head goal difference; 4) Head-to-head goals scored; 5) Head-to-head away goals scored (only if two teams); 6) Goal difference; 7) Goals scored; 8) Fairplay ranking; 9) Draw.
(C) Champions; (O) Play-off winners

===== Results summary =====
Overall								Home						Away					
Pld	W	D	L	GF	GA	GD	Pts	W	D	L	GF	GA	GD	W	D	L	GF	GA	GD
5	3	0	2	7	4	+3	9	3	0	0	7	1	+6	0	0	2	0	3	−3

Last updated: 22 May 2021.
Source: See results

===== Results by round =====
Round	1	2	3	4	5
Ground	H	A	H	A	H
Result	W	L	W	L	W
Position	3	3	3	3	3

Updated to match(es) played on 26 May 2021. Source: See Results
A = Away; H = Home; W = Win; D = Draw; L = Loss

===== Results =====
3 May 2021 27	CSKA	1−0	Arda	Sofia
20:15 UTC+3	Mattheij 88', (yellow card) 90'	Report	Yordanov (yellow card) 70'; Martinov (yellow card) 90'	Stadium: Stadion Balgarska Armia; Referee: Stanimir Trenchev (Sofia); Man of the Match: Jurgen Mattheij
Note: On 23 April 2021 the Ministry for Health announced that stadiums are allowed to host up to 30% of its capacity, but no more than 1,000 spectators per block.

12 May 2021 29	CSKA	4−1	Ludogorets	Sofia
19:30 UTC+3	Mattheij 4', (yellow card) 90+2'; Bismark 54'; Koch 62'; Mazikou (yellow card) 89'; Caicedo 90+7' (pen.)	Report	Badji (yellow card) 50'; Cicinho 59'; Tekpetey (yellow card) 61'; Dambrauskas (yellow card) 69'; Despodov (yellow card) 70'; Tchibota (yellow card) 90+1' (yellow-red card) 90+3'	Stadium: Stadion Balgarska Armia; Referee: Georgi Kabakov (Plovdiv); Man of the Match: Jurgen Mattheij
Note: On 23 April 2021 the Ministry for Health announced that stadiums are allowed to host up to 30% of its capacity, but no more than 1,000 spectators per block.

15 May 2021 30	Lokomotiv	2−0	CSKA	Plovdiv
20:00 UTC+3	Masoero (yellow card) 39'; Iliev 76' (pen.), 84'	Report	Turitsov (yellow card) 68'; Bismark (yellow card) 76'; Koch (yellow card) 82'	Stadium: Stadion Lokomotiv; Referee: Georgi Dimitrov (Sofia); Man of the Match: Dimitar Iliev
Note: On 23 April 2021 the Ministry for Health announced that stadiums are allowed to host up to 30% of its capacity, but no more than 1,000 spectators per block.

22 May 2021 28	CSKA 1948	1−0	CSKA	Sofia
19:00 UTC+3	Haydarov (yellow card) 23'; Topuzov 65', (yellow card) 74'; Klimentov (yellow card) 72'; Damyanov (yellow card) 79'; Marin (yellow card) 90+4'	Report	Vion (yellow card) 11'; Turitsov (yellow card) 57'; Tiago (yellow card) 76'; Carey (yellow card) 83'; Youga (yellow card) 85'; Caicedo (yellow card) 89', (penalty missed) 90+5'	Stadium: Natsionalen stadion Vasil Levski; Referee: Georgi Kabakov (Plovdiv); Man of the Match: Daniel Naumov
Note: On 23 April 2021 the Ministry for Health announced that stadiums are allowed to host up to 30% of its capacity, but no more than 1,000 spectators per block. CSKA 1948 requested its postponement for a later date because members of its staff, including 11 players, tested positive for COVID-19. The scheduling committee of the BFU, however, rejected this request citing schedule congetion. The BFU decision has been confirmed by its appeal committee on 7 May. On the same day the scheduling committee confirmed that they have received a notification from CSKA 1948 that the team would not attend the game with a pending decision on the game outcome. As the game has not taken place, on 10 May the technical committee of the BFU awarded a 3−0 win to CSKA and 3 points. However, on 13 May the technical committee of the BFU revoked the decisions from 7 and 10 May and decided to reschedule the game for 22 May.

26 May 2021 31	CSKA	2−0	Beroe	Sofia
20:00 UTC+3	Caicedo 4'; Tiago 48'; Mitkov (yellow card) 90+6'	Report	A. Vasilev (yellow card) 43'	Stadium: Stadion Balgarska Armia; Referee: Vladimir Valkov (Plovdiv); Man of the Match: Tiago Rodrigues
Note: On 23 April 2021 the Ministry for Health announced that stadiums are allowed to host up to 30% of its capacity, but no more than 1,000 spectators per block. The game was originally scheduled for 22 May, but following the several COVID-19-related reschedules it has been moved for 26 May.

=== Bulgarian Cup ===
14 November 2020 1R	Botev Ihtiman	0−5	CSKA	Sofia
15:45 UTC+2		Report	Sowe 34'; Sinclair 55', 70'; Beltrame 64'; Ahmedov 76'	Stadium: Stadion Balgarska Armia; Attendance: 0 Referee: Hristiyana Guteva (Sofia)
Note: On 11 November 2020 the Ministry of Health announced that stadiums are not allowed to host spectators until 30 November due to the ongoing increase of COVID-19-related infections in Bulgaria.

2 March 2021 2R	CSKA	3−1	Cherno More	Sofia
17:30 UTC+2	Bismark 9'; Yomov 39' (pen.), 49'; Vion (yellow card) 61'; Caicedo (yellow card) 69'; Koch (yellow card) 74'	Report	Drobarov (yellow card) 56'; Dimov 62'; Panov (yellow card) 86'	Stadium: Stadion Balgarska Armia; Attendance: 0 Referee: Volen Chinkov (Sofia)
Note: On 26 January 2021 the Ministry of Health announced that stadiums are not allowed to host spectators until 30 April 2021 due to an ongoing COVID-19 pandemic in Bulgaria in Bulgaria.

18 March 2021 QF	CSKA	4−0	Botev Vratsa	Sofia
17:00 UTC+2	Caicedo 11', 39' (pen.), 75'; Galabov (yellow card) 36'; Vion (yellow card) 51'; Bismark 78'	Report	Genov (yellow card) 56'; Babunski (yellow card) 63'; Nichev (yellow card) 67'	Stadium: Stadion Balgarska Armia; Attendance: 0 Referee: Georgi Nikolov (Sofia)
Note: On 26 January 2021 the Ministry of Health announced that stadiums are not allowed to host spectators until 30 April 2021 due to an ongoing COVID-19 pandemic in Bulgaria in Bulgaria.

7 April 2021 SF Leg 1	CSKA	1−1	Ludogorets	Sofia
19:30 UTC+3	Turitsov (yellow card) 36'; Geferson (yellow card) 71'; Tiago 77'	Report	Tekpetey (yellow card) 15' (yellow-red card) 60'; Cicinho (yellow card) 69'; Cauly 83'	Stadium: Stadion Balgarska Armia; Attendance: 0 Referee: Volen Chinkov (Sofia)
Note: On 26 January 2021 the Ministry of Health announced that stadiums are not allowed to host spectators until 30 April 2021 due to an ongoing COVID-19 pandemic in Bulgaria in Bulgaria.

14 April 2021 SF Leg 2	Ludogorets	1−2 (2−3 agg.)	CSKA	Razgrad
18:30 UTC+3	Verdon (yellow card) 24'; Ikoko (yellow card) 45'; Nedyalkov (yellow card) 53'; Manu 73', (yellow card) 90+4'; Santana (red card) 86'; Grigore (yellow card) 90+5'	Report	Henrique 3', (yellow card) 38'; Tiago (yellow card) 23'; Yomov 36'; Mattheij (yellow card) 61'; Youga (yellow card) 72'; Turitsov (yellow card) 74' (yellow-red card) 86'; Mazikou (yellow card) 83'; Bismark (yellow card) 84'; Penev (yellow card) 77' (yellow-red card) 86'; Busatto (yellow card) 90+3'	Stadium: Huvepharma Arena; Attendance: 0 Referee: Georgi Kabakov (Plovdiv)
Note: On 26 January 2021 the Ministry of Health announced that stadiums are not allowed to host spectators until 30 April 2021 due to an ongoing COVID-19 pandemic in Bulgaria in Bulgaria.

19 May 2021 Final	Arda	0−1	CSKA	Sofia
19:30 UTC+3	Martinov (yellow card) 62'; Tilev (yellow card) 82'; Petkov (yellow card) 89'	Report	Carey (yellow card) 27'; Mattheij (yellow card) 57'; Sinclair (yellow card) 60'; Bismark 85'; Busatto (yellow card) 90'	Stadium: Natsionalen stadion Vasil Levski; Attendance: 22,000; Referee: Volen Chinkov (Sofia)
Note: On 23 April 2021 the Ministry for Health announced that stadiums are allowed to host up to 30% of its capacity, but no more than 1,000 spectators per block.

=== UEFA Europa League ===
==== First qualifying round ====
27 August 2020 1QR	CSKA (Bulgaria)	2−1	(Malta) Sirens	Sofia, Bulgaria
20:00 UTC+3	Mattheij (yellow card) 47'; Mazikou (yellow card) 73'; Ahmedov 75'; Sankharé (yellow card) 88'; Sowe 90+1'	Report	Scicluna (yellow card) 43'; Maxuell (penalty missed) 48', 69'	Stadium: Stadion Balgarska Armia; Attendance: 0 Referee: Krzysztof Jakubik (Poland)
Note: Although the Bulgarian authorities allow spectators on open-door sports events, the game will be played behind closed doors as per UEFA regulations.

==== Second qualifying round ====
17 September 2020 2QR	CSKA (Bulgaria)	2−0	(Belarus) BATE Borisov	Sofia, Bulgaria
20:00 UTC+3	Busatto (yellow card) 32'; Sowe 44'; Carey 90+5'	Report	Milić (penalty missed) 33'; Yablonskiy (yellow card) 46'; Filipović (yellow card) 63'; Dubajić (yellow card) 90+4'	Stadium: Stadion Balgarska Armia; Attendance: 0 Referee: Horatiu Fesnic (Romania)
Note: Although the Bulgarian authorities allow spectators on open-door sports events, the game will be played behind closed doors as per UEFA regulations.

==== Third qualifying round ====
24 September 2020 3QR	CSKA (Bulgaria)	3−1	(Faroe Islands) B36 Tórshavn	Sofia, Bulgaria
20:00 UTC+3	Geferson (yellow card) 15'; Sowe 27'; Yomov 38'; Keita 83'	Report	Nielsen (yellow card) 26'; Jacobsen (yellow card) 47'; Heinesen (yellow card) 58'; Pingel 61'	Stadium: Stadion Balgarska Armia; Attendance: 0 Referee: Tamás Bognár (Hungary)
Note: Although the Bulgarian authorities allow spectators on open-door sports events, the game was played behind closed doors as per UEFA regulations.

==== Play-off round ====
1 October 2020 PO	Basel (Switzerland)	1−3	(Bulgaria) CSKA	Basel, Switzerland
21:30 UTC+3	Padula (yellow card) 49'; Arthur 54' (pen.); Alderete (yellow card) 87'; Cömert (yellow card) 90+5'	Report	Geferson (yellow card) 45'; Galabov (yellow card) 58'; Mazikou (yellow card) 66'; Tiago 72', 88'; Sankharé (yellow card) 75'; Youga (yellow card) 90+5'; Ahmedov 90+6'; Keita (yellow card) 90+7'	Stadium: St. Jakob-Park; Attendance: 0 Referee: Ivan Kružliak (Slovakia)
Note: Although the Swiss authorities allow spectators on open-door sports events, the game will be played behind closed doors as per UEFA regulations.

==== Group stage ====
Pos	Team	Pld	W	D	L	GF	GA	GD	Pts	Qualification	ROM	YB	CLJ	CSS
1	(Italy) Roma	6	4	1	1	13	5	+8	13	Advance to knockout phase	—	3–1	5–0	0–0
2	(Switzerland) Young Boys	6	3	1	2	9	7	+2	10	Advance to knockout phase	1–2	—	2–1	3–0
3	(Romania) CFR Cluj	6	1	2	3	4	10	−6	5 (Note: Head-to-head points: CFR Cluj 4, CSKA Sofia 1.)		0–2	1–1	—	0–0
4	(Bulgaria) CSKA Sofia	6	1	2	3	3	7	−4	5		3–1	0–1	0–2	—

Source: UEFA
Rules for classification: Group stage tiebreakers
Notes:

22 October 2020 1	CSKA (Bulgaria)	0−2	(Romania) CFR Cluj	Sofia, Bulgaria
19:55 UTC+3	Yomov (yellow card) 61'; Vion (yellow card) 83'; Mattheij (yellow card) 90+3'	Report	Rondón 53'; Deac 74' (pen.); Chipciu (yellow card) 83'	Stadium: Natsionalen stadion Vasil Levski; Attendance: 11,958; Referee: Halil Umut Meler (Turkey)

29 October 2020 2	Roma (Italy)	0−0	(Bulgaria) CSKA	Rome, Italy
22:00 UTC+2	Peres (yellow card) 41'; Karsdorp (yellow card) 80'; Villar (yellow card) 84'	Report	Zanev (yellow card) 86'; Busatto (yellow card) 87'	Stadium: Stadio Olimpico; Attendance: 0 Referee: Aleksei Kulbakov (Belarus)

5 November 2020 3	Young Boys (Switzerland)	3−0	(Bulgaria) CSKA	Bern, Switzerland
22:00 UTC+2	Mambimbi 2', 32'; Sulejmani 19'; Camara (yellow card) 51'; Aebischer (yellow card) 68'	Report	Youga (yellow card) 68'	Stadium: Stadion Wankdorf; Attendance: 0 Referee: Lawrence Visser (Belgium)

26 November 2020 4	CSKA (Bulgaria)	0−1	(Switzerland) Young Boys	Sofia, Bulgaria
19:55 UTC+2	Sinclair (yellow card) 90+2'	Report	Nsame 34', (yellow card) 90+4'	Stadium: Natsionalen stadion Vasil Levski; Attendance: 0 Referee: Fábio Veríssimo (Portugal)

3 December 2020 5	CFR Cluj (Romania)	0−0	(Bulgaria) CSKA	Cluj-Napoca, Romania
22:00 UTC+2	Sušić (yellow card) 33'; Chipciu (yellow card) 54' (yellow-red card) 85'	Report	Vion (yellow card) 1'; Geferson (yellow card) 54'	Stadium: Stadionul Dr. Constantin Rădulescu; Attendance: 0 Referee: Amaury Delerue (France)

10 December 2020 6	CSKA (Bulgaria)	3−1	(Italy) Roma	Sofia, Bulgaria
19:55 UTC+2	Tiago 5'; Sowe 34', 55'; Antov (yellow card) 89'	Report	Milanese 22'; Tripi (yellow card) 83'	Stadium: Natsionalen stadion Vasil Levski; Attendance: 0 Referee: Irfan Peljto (Bosnia and Herzegovina)

== Statistics ==
=== Appearances and goals ===
As of 26 May 2021

No.	Pos	Player	Parva Liga		Bulgarian Cup		Europa League		Total	
No.	Pos	Player	Apps	Goals	Apps	Goals	Apps	Goals	Apps	Goals
1	GK	(Brazil) Gustavo Busatto	26	-21	5	-3	10	-10	41	-34
2	DF	(Netherlands) Jurgen Mattheij	25	3	6	0	9	0	40	3
3	DF	(Brazil) Geferson	12+3	0	4	0	6	0	25	0
4	DF	(Netherlands) Menno Koch	11+1	1	5	0	0	0	17	1
5	MF	(Argentina) Federico Varela	7+3	0	1+1	0	0	0	12	0
6	DF	(Bulgaria) Mitko Mitkov	0+4	0	1+1	0	0	0	6	0
7	MF	(Brazil) Henrique	13+9	2	2+3	1	2+6	0	35	3
8	MF	(Republic of Ireland) Graham Carey	13+11	1	1+2	0	4+2	1	33	2
9	MF	(Venezuela) Adalberto Peñaranda	5	0	1+1	0	1+1	0	9	0
10	MF	(Bulgaria) Georgi Yomov	15+11	0	3+2	3	9+1	1	41	4
11	DF	(Bulgaria) Petar Zanev	16+3	0	1	0	4	0	24	0
14	MF	(Guinea) Jules Keita	9+5	2	0+1	0	1+5	1	21	3
15	DF	(France) Thibaut Vion	18+1	2	2+1	0	4+1	0	27	2
16	DF	(Bulgaria) Asen Donchev	1+1	0	0	0	0	0	2	0
17	FW	(Ghana) Bismark Charles	6+6	2	1+3	3	0	0	16	5
18	DF	(Republic of the Congo) Bradley Mazikou	22+3	1	5	0	8	0	38	1
19	DF	(Bulgaria) Ivan Turitsov	13+6	0	3+2	0	1+2	0	27	0
20	MF	(Portugal) Tiago Rodrigues	21+6	3	6	1	4+6	3	43	7
21	MF	(Central African Republic) Amos Youga	25+4	0	3	0	9+1	0	42	0
24	FW	(England) Jerome Sinclair	10+8	1	5	2	3+1	0	27	3
25	GK	(Bulgaria) Dimitar Evtimov	5+1	-3	1	0	0	0	7	-3
27	FW	(Bulgaria) Martin Smolenski	1+6	0	0+3	0	0	0	10	0
28	DF	(Bulgaria) Plamen Galabov	13+6	0	2	0	4+1	0	26	0
29	MF	(Bulgaria) Aleksandar Buchkov	0	0	0+2	0	0	0	2	0
30	FW	(Ecuador) Jordy Caicedo	11+3	7	5	3	0	0	19	10
Players away from the club on loan:
22	FW	(The Gambia) Ali Sowe	15+1	8	1	1	10	5	27	14
23	FW	(Bulgaria) Ahmed Ahmedov	2+9	1	0+1	1	0+7	2	19	4
26	DF	(Bulgaria) Valentin Antov	14+2	2	0	0	10	0	26	2
Players who appeared for CSKA Sofia that left during the season:
9	FW	(Australia) Tomi Juric	1+2	1	1	0	0	0	4	1
10	MF	(Italy) Stefano Beltrame	2+12	1	0+1	1	2+3	0	20	2
13	MF	(Senegal) Younousse Sankharé	10+2	3	1	0	9+1	0	23	3
15	MF	(Bulgaria) Kristiyan Malinov	0+1	0	0	0	0	0	1	0
17	FW	(Bulgaria) Tonislav Yordanov	0+1	0	0	0	0	0	1	0

=== Goalscorers ===
Place	Position	Nation	Number	Name	Parva Liga	Bulgarian Cup	Europa League	Total
1	FW	(The Gambia)	22	Ali Sowe	8	1	5	14
2	FW	(Ecuador)	30	Jordy Caicedo	7	3	0	10
3	MF	(Portugal)	20	Tiago Rodrigues	3	1	3	7
4	FW	(Ghana)	17	Bismark Charles	2	3	0	5
5	MF	(Bulgaria)	10	Georgi Yomov	0	3	1	4
5	FW	(Bulgaria)	23	Ahmed Ahmedov	1	1	2	4
7	DF	(Netherlands)	2	Jurgen Mattheij	3	0	0	3
7	MF	(Brazil)	7	Henrique	2	1	0	3
7	MF	(Senegal)	13	Younousse Sankharé	3	0	0	3
7	MF	(Guinea)	14	Jules Keita	2	0	1	3
7	FW	(England)	24	Jerome Sinclair	1	2	0	3
12	DF	(Netherlands)	4	Menno Koch	2	0	0	2
12	MF	(Republic of Ireland)	8	Graham Carey	1	0	1	2
12	MF	(Italy)	10	Stefano Beltrame	1	1	0	2
12	DF	(France)	15	Thibaut Vion	2	0	0	2
12	DF	(Bulgaria)	26	Valentin Antov	2	0	0	2
17	FW	(Australia)	9	Tomi Juric	1	0	0	1
17	DF	(Republic of the Congo)	18	Bradley Mazikou	1	0	0	1
				Own goal	4	0	0	4
TOTALS					46	16	13	75

As of 26 May 2021

=== Disciplinary record ===
Includes all competitive matches. Players listed below made at least one appearance for CSKA first squad during the season.

N	P	Nat.	Name	Parva Liga			Bulgarian Cup			Europa League			Total			Notes
N	P	Nat.	Name	Yellow card	Second yellow card	Red card	Yellow card	Second yellow card	Red card	Yellow card	Second yellow card	Red card	Yellow card	Second yellow card	Red card	Notes
1	GK	(Brazil)	Busatto	1			2			2			5			
2	DF	(Netherlands)	Mattheij	6			2			2			10			
3	DF	(Brazil)	Geferson	1			1			3			5			
4	DF	(Netherlands)	Koch	3			1						4			
6	MF	(Bulgaria)	Mitkov	2						3			5			
7	MF	(Brazil)	Henrique				1			3			4			
8	MF	(Republic of Ireland)	Carey	4			1						5			
9	MF	(Colombia)	Peñaranda	1						2			3			
10	MF	(Bulgaria)	Yomov	5						1			6			
10	MF	(Italy)	Beltrame	2									2			
11	DF	(Bulgaria)	Zanev	5	1					1			6	1		
13	MF	(Senegal)	Sankharé	2	1					2			4	1		
14	MF	(Guinea)	Keita	2						2			4			
15	DF	(France)	Vion	4			2			2			8			
17	FW	(Ghana)	Bismark	2			1						3			
18	DF	(Republic of the Congo)	Mazikou	5			1			2			8			
19	DF	(Bulgaria)	Turitsov	3			2	1					5	1		
20	MF	(Portugal)	Tiago	5			1						6			
21	MF	(Central African Republic)	Youga	7	1		1			2			10	1		
23	FW	(Bulgaria)	Ahmedov	3									3			
24	FW	(England)	Sinclair	1			1			1			3			
25	GK	(Bulgaria)	Evtimov	2									2			
26	DF	(Bulgaria)	Antov	4						1			5			
28	DF	(Bulgaria)	Galabov	3			1			1			5			
30	FW	(Ecuador)	Caicedo	3			1			1			5			

Last updated: 26 May 2021
Source: Competitive matches
Only competitive matches
(yellow card) = Number of bookings; (second yellow card) = Number of sending offs after a second yellow card; (red card) = Number of sending offs by a direct red card.

== See also ==
- PFC CSKA Sofia
