= Dimitar Evtimov =

Bulgarian footballer

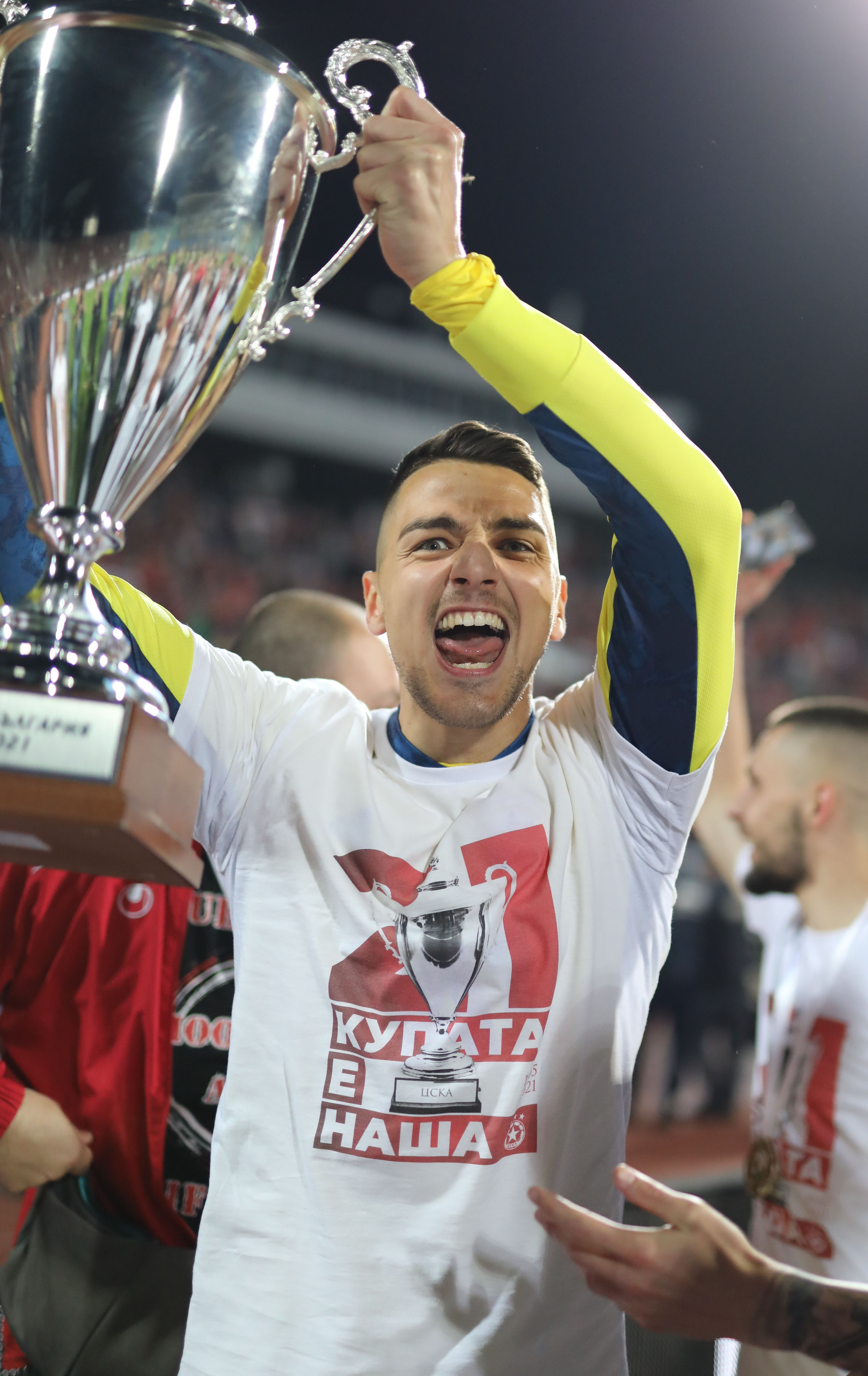
- Evtimov with CSKA Sofia in 2021

Personal information
- Full name: Dimitar Ivanov Evtimov
- Date of birth: 7 September 1993 (age 33)
- Place of birth: Shumen, Bulgaria
- Height: 1.90 m (6 ft 3 in)
- Position: Goalkeeper

Team information
- Current team: CSKA Sofia
- Number: 25

Youth career
- 2000–2009: Volov Shumen
- 2009–2010: Chavdar Etropole

Senior career*
Years	Team	Apps	(Gls)
2010–2011	Chavdar Etropole	5	(0)
2011–2018	Nottingham Forest	2	(0)
2011	→ Ilkeston (loan)	2	(0)
2011	→ Gainsborough Trinity (loan)	3	(0)
2013	→ Nuneaton Town (loan)	4	(0)
2014–2015	→ Mansfield Town (loan)	10	(0)
2016–2017	→ Olhanense (loan)	10	(0)
2017	→ Port Vale (loan)	1	(0)
2018–2019	Burton Albion	7	(0)
2019–2020	Accrington Stanley	30	(0)
2020–2025	CSKA Sofia	20	(0)
2024	→ Karmiotissa (loan)	1	(0)
2025	→ Botev Vratsa (loan)	16	(0)
2025–2026	Botev Vratsa	18	(0)
2026–	CSKA Sofia	1	(0)
2026–	CSKA Sofia II	1	(0)

International career
2010–2011	Bulgaria U19	5	(0)
2013	Bulgaria U21	4	(0)
2025–	Bulgaria	0	(0)
- * Club domestic league appearances and goals as of 16:19, 25 April 2026 (UTC)

Dimitar Ivanov Evtimov (Bulgarian: Димитър Иванов Евтимов; born 7 September 1993) is a Bulgarian professional footballer who plays as a goalkeeper for CSKA Sofia.

A former Bulgaria under-21 international, he was signed to Chavdar Etropole from Volov Shumen in 2009. He made his first-team debut during the 2010–11 season before he joined English club Nottingham Forest in April 2011. From Forest he has spent time on loan at Ilkeston, Gainsborough Trinity, Nuneaton Town, Mansfield Town, Olhanense (Portugal), and Port Vale. He was named the Championship Apprentice of the Year for the 2012–13 season. However, he left the club in August 2018 after making a total of just three first-team appearances. He signed with Burton Albion in September 2018 and then moved on to Accrington Stanley four months later. He returned to Bulgaria to sign with CSKA Sofia in July 2020 and won the Bulgarian Cup at the end of the 2020–21 season. He was loaned to Karmiotissa of the Cypriot First Division in July 2024 and to divisional rivals Botev Vratsa in January 2025, whom he joined permanently five months later.

== Club career ==
=== Chavdar Etropole ===
Evtimov signed with Chavdar Etropole from Volov Shumen in 2009. He made his first-team debut in a 5–1 victory over Kom on 18 September 2010. He made a total of five appearances in the B Group in the 2010–11 season.

=== Nottingham Forest ===
Evtimov signed for the English club Nottingham Forest in April 2011. He spent a brief time on loan at Ilkeston, before he joined Gainsborough Trinity in the Conference North on a one-month loan on 10 November 2011. He played three matches in the space of a week for Steve Housham's "Holy Blues", before losing his first-team place. He was named the Championship Apprentice of the Year for the 2012–13 season. On 16 July 2013, he joined Conference Premier club Nuneaton Town on a three-month loan deal. He made four appearances during his stay at Liberty Way. He made his first-team debut for Forest on 21 April 2014, coming on as a late substitute for the injured Dorus de Vries in a 2–0 win at Leeds United. He signed a new two-year contract with the club three months later after new manager Stuart Pearce was told by caretaker manager Gary Brazil that he was a good prospect.

A loan to Wrexham fell through in July 2014 after manager Kevin Wilkin was unable to accept an instant recall option demanded by Forest due to regulations by the FAW. Evtimov instead joined Nottinghamshire League Two club Mansfield Town on 19 August, on loan until 3 January, after impressing manager Paul Cox during pre-season. He was named on the Football League team of the week for his performance in a 1–0 win at AFC Wimbledon on 20 December. He played a total of 11 games for the "Stags", and new manager Adam Murray stated that "we attempted to extend his loan but unfortunately for us, Forest see him as part of their long-term plans". Evtimov extended his contract with Forest by a further four years in July 2015, tying him to the club until 2019. Following an injury to de Vries, he made his second appearance for Forest at Sheffield Wednesday on 31 October 2015, and manager Dougie Freedman said that he "cost us the game" after he allowed a strike from Fernando Forestieri to creep underneath him for the only goal of the game.

On 31 August 2016, he signed on loan with Portuguese club Olhanense for the 2016–17 season, who were bottom of the LigaPro. His loan spell at the Estádio José Arcanjo proved a difficult one as he conceded within three minutes of his debut, in a 3–2 defeat at União da Madeira on 10 September. Manager Cristiano Bacci lost his job the following month, and though Evtimov established himself in the first-team under new boss Bruno Baltazar, he was recalled from his loan spell earlier than planned on 13 January, having made ten appearances for the "Lions". Evtimov started the 2017–18 season as Mark Warburton's third-choice goalkeeper behind Jordan Smith and Stephen Henderson, and was advised by former "Reds" goalkeeper Barry Roche to go out on loan to find first-team football. On 8 August 2017, Evtimov started Forest's first round EFL Cup tie against Shrewsbury Town, conceding a penalty in a 2–1 win. This was Evtimov's first game for Forest since October 2015 and his home debut at the City Ground six years after first joining the club.

On 28 October 2017, Evtimov joined League Two club Port Vale on an emergency loan following an injury to loanee goalkeeper Kelle Roos, and made his "Valiants" debut later that day against Swindon Town at Vale Park. At fault for at least one of the goals in a 3–0 defeat, The Sentinel's Michael Baggaley wrote that "Evtimov looked as though he had only just been introduced to his defence, but that’s not a criticism because actually he had". Manager Neil Aspin reserved his criticism for the club's medical staff as they only ruled Roos as unfit to play the previous day. On 31 August 2018, Evtimov's contract with Nottingham Forest was terminated by mutual consent after he found himself behind Costel Pantilimon, Luke Steele and Jordan Smith in the first-team pecking order.

=== Burton Albion ===
On 14 September 2018, Evtimov signed a one-month contract with EFL League One club Burton Albion after manager Nigel Clough looked for a goalkeeper with experience in the English Football League to stand in for the injured Stephen Bywater and Bradley Collins. He made his debut the following day in a 2–1 win over Sunderland at the Pirelli Stadium. After the game he said that he was happy with the win and passed on his best wishes to opposition striker Charlie Wyke, who he injured during an accidental collision. On 16 October, Evtimov signed a new one-month contract. Despite Collins being restored to the starting line-up, Evtimov went on to sign a second contract extension with the "Brewers" to keep him at the club until January.

=== Accrington Stanley ===
On 19 January 2019, Evtimov signed an 18-month contract with EFL League One club Accrington Stanley. He was signed by manager John Coleman after loanee goalkeeper Connor Ripley was recalled by Middlesbrough. He made his debut the same day, replacing Luke Armstrong in the 83rd minute of the club's 1–0 defeat at Charlton Athletic after Jonny Maxted was sent off; after the match he said he was "gutted" to concede the only goal of the game from the penalty spot in the third minute of stoppage-time. On 5 March, he was sent off after he tossed a bottle thrown by a Blackpool fan back into the crowd. He was sent off for the second time in his Stanley career on 20 April after giving away two penalties in a 3–0 defeat to Luton Town at the Crown Ground. He was one of five players released by the club at the end of the 2019–20 season.

=== CSKA Sofia ===
On 17 July 2020, Evtimov returned to Bulgaria, signing for First League side CSKA Sofia, a club he supported growing up. He was a back-up to Brazilian goalkeeper Gustavo Busatto and played only seven games during the 2020–21 season. He won a Bulgarian Cup winners' medal after being an unused substitute in the 2021 cup final win over Arda Kardzhali at the Vasil Levski National Stadium. He featured twelve times in the 2021–22 season and played six games in the 2022–23 campaign. He featured three times in the 2023–24 campaign. He joined Cypriot First Division club Karmiotissa on loan for the 2024–25 season. He was released by CSKA at the end of the 2024–25 campaign.

=== Botev Vratsa ===
On 27 January 2025, Evtimov joined Botev Vratsa on loan until the end of the 2024–25 season. He played 20 games for the Green Lions, keeping a clean sheet in the promotion/relegation play-off win over Pirin Blagoevgrad. On 18 June 2025, he joined the club on a two-year contract.

=== Return to CSKA Sofia ===
Evtimov rejoined CSKA Sofia and was an unused substitute in the 2026 Bulgarian Cup final victory over Lokomotiv Plovdiv.

== International career ==
Evtimov won caps for the under-19 and under-21 teams before he was called up to the senior Bulgaria squad in November 2018.

== Career statistics ==
As of match played 18 October 2026

Appearances and goals by club, season and competition
Club	Season	League			National cup (Note: Includes Bulgarian Cup, FA Cup, Taça de Portugal, Bulgarian Cup, Cypriot Cup)		League cup (Note: Includes Football League Cup, Taça da Liga)		Other		Total	
Club	Season	Division	Apps	Goals	Apps	Goals	Apps	Goals	Apps	Goals	Apps	Goals
Chavdar Etropole	2010–11	B Group	5	0	0	0	—		0	0	5	0
Nottingham Forest	2012–13	Championship	0	0	0	0	0	0	—		0	0
Nottingham Forest	2013–14	Championship	1	0	0	0	0	0	—		1	0
Nottingham Forest	2014–15	Championship	0	0	0	0	0	0	—		0	0
Nottingham Forest	2015–16	Championship	1	0	0	0	0	0	—		1	0
Nottingham Forest	2016–17	Championship	0	0	0	0	0	0	—		0	0
Nottingham Forest	2017–18	Championship	0	0	0	0	1	0	—		1	0
Nottingham Forest	2018–19	Championship	0	0	0	0	0	0	—		0	0
Nottingham Forest	Total		2	0	0	0	1	0	—		3	0
Ilkeston (loan)	2011–12	Northern Premier League; Division One South	2	0	—		—		1 (Note: Appearance(s) in FA Trophy)	0	3	0
Gainsborough Trinity (loan)	2011–12	Conference North	3	0	0	0	—		0	0	3	0
Nuneaton Town (loan)	2013–14	Conference Premier	4	0	0	0	—		0	0	4	0
Mansfield Town (loan)	2014–15	League Two	10	0	0	0	—		1 (Note: Appearance(s) in Football League Trophy / EFL Trophy)	0	11	0
Olhanense (loan)	2016–17	LigaPro	10	0	0	0	—		0	0	10	0
Port Vale (loan)	2017–18	League Two	1	0	0	0	—		0	0	1	0
Burton Albion	2018–19	League One	7	0	0	0	2	0	1	0	10	0
Accrington Stanley	2018–19	League One	11	0	—		—		—		11	0
Accrington Stanley	2019–20	League One	19	0	1	0	1	0	0	0	21	0
Accrington Stanley	Total		30	0	1	0	1	0	0	0	32	0
CSKA Sofia	2020–21	First League	6	0	1	0	—		0	0	7	0
CSKA Sofia	2021–22	First League	8	0	4	0	—		0	0	12	0
CSKA Sofia	2022–23	First League	3	0	3	0	—		0	0	6	0
CSKA Sofia	2023–24	First League	3	0	2	0	—		1 (Note: Appearance(s) in play-offs)	0	6	0
CSKA Sofia	2024–25	First League	0	0	0	0	—		—		0	0
CSKA Sofia	Total		20	0	10	0	—		1	0	31	0
Karmiotissa (loan)	2024–25	Cypriot First Division	1	0	0	0	—		—		1	0
Botev Vratsa (loan)	2024–25	First League	16	0	3	0	—		1	0	20	0
Botev Vratsa	2025–26	First League	18	0	1	0	—		0	0	19	0
Botev Vratsa	Total		34	0	4	0	—		1	0	39	0
CSKA Sofia	2025–26	First League	1	0	0	0	—		—		1	0
CSKA Sofia	2026–27	First League	0	0	1	0	1	0	0	0	2	0
CSKA Sofia	Total		1	0	1	0	1	0	0	0	3	0
CSKA Sofia II	2026–27	Second League	1	0	–		–		–		1	0
Career total			131	0	16	0	5	0	5	0	157	0

== Honours ==
CSKA Sofia

- Bulgarian Cup: 2021, 2026
- Bulgarian Supercup: 2026

Individual

- Championship Apprentice of the Year: 2012–13
