= Bismark Charles =

Ghanaian footballer (born 2001)

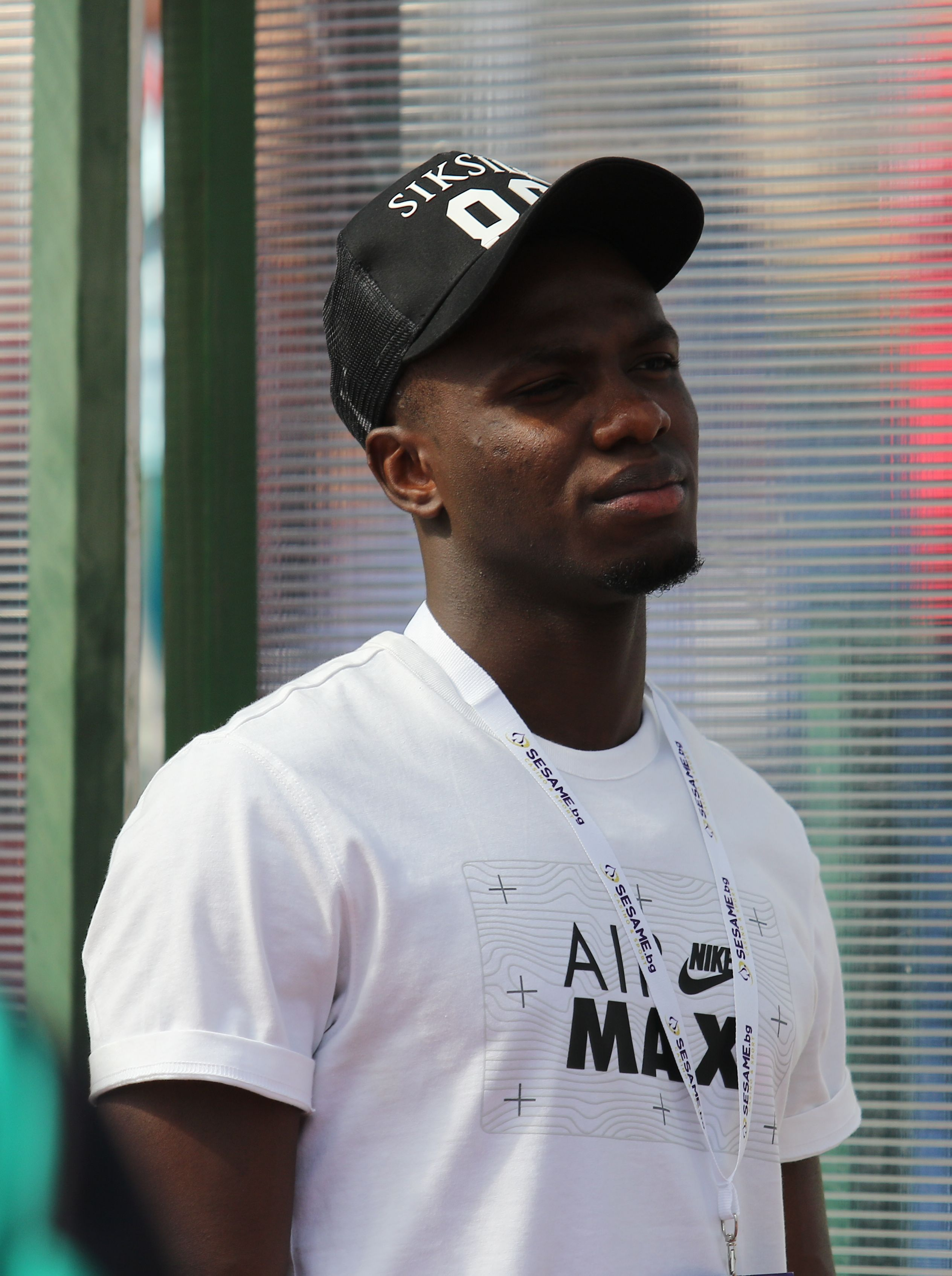
- Charles in 2022

Personal information
- Full name: Bismark Charles Kwarena Sie
- Date of birth: 26 May 2001 (age 25)
- Place of birth: Berekum, Ghana
- Height: 1.85 m (6 ft 1 in)
- Position: Striker

Team information
- Current team: Skënderbeu
- Number: 98

Youth career
- –2019: Berekum Chelsea

Senior career*
Years	Team	Apps	(Gls)
2019–2020	Vushtrria	9	(4)
2020–2021	Trepça '89	17	(6)
2021–2024	CSKA Sofia	35	(2)
2023–2024	→ Pirin Blagoevgrad (loan)	0	(0)
2024	→ Željezničar (loan)	3	(0)
2024–	Skënderbeu	32	(8)
2025–2026	→ Vllaznia Shkodër (loan)	18	(2)
- * Club domestic league appearances and goals as of 24 June 2026

Bismark Charles Kwarena Sie (born 26 May 2001), commonly known as Bismark Charles, is a Ghanaian professional footballer who plays as a striker for Skënderbeu.

== Club career ==
=== Vushtrria ===
On 1 February 2020, Charles joined Kosovo Superleague side Vushtrria. On 5 March 2020, he made his debut against Dukagjini after being named in the starting line-up and scored his side's second goal during a 3–3 home draw.

=== Trepça '89 ===
On 1 August 2020, Charles signed with Trepça '89. On 18 September 2020, he made his debut in a 2–0 home defeat to Arbëria, coming on as a substitute in the 73rd minute in place of Mohamed Darwish. On 25 October 2020, Charles scored a hat-trick for Trepça in his seventh appearance for the club in a 4–3 home win over Ballkani.

=== CSKA Sofia ===
On 12 February 2021, Charles joined Bulgarian First League club CSKA Sofia after a trial that was approved by manager Bruno Akrapović. Fifteen days later, he made his debut in a 1–0 away defeat to Ludogorets Razgrad after coming on as a substitute in the 76th minute in place of Georgi Yomov.

Three days after his debut, "The Chancellor", as he is called by the media in Bulgaria because of the same name as Otto von Bismarck, marked his first goal for the "armymen", in the 2020–21 Bulgarian Cup round of 16 against Cherno More Varna. On 19 May 2021, Charles scored the winner in the Bulgarian Cup final against Arda Kardzhali in the 85th minute, which granted CSKA Sofia a Bulgarian Cup title.

==== Loan to Željezničar ====
On 30 January 2024, Charles was loaned to Bosnian Premier League club Željezničar for the remainder of the 2023–24 season. He made his debut in a 3–0 home win against Sarajevo in the city derby on 3 March 2024.

== Career statistics ==
=== Club ===
As of match played 16 February 2025

Appearances and goals by club, season and competition
Club	Season	League			Cup		Continental		Other		Total	
Club	Season	Division	Apps	Goals	Apps	Goals	Apps	Goals	Apps	Goals	Apps	Goals
Vushtrria	2019–20	Kosovo Superleague	9	4	0	0	—		—		9	4
Trepça '89	2020–21	Kosovo Superleague	17	6	0	0	—		—		17	6
CSKA Sofia	2020–21	Bulgarian First League	12	2	4	3	—		—		16	5
CSKA Sofia	2021–22	Bulgarian First League	11	0	1	0	3	0	0	0	15	0
CSKA Sofia	2022–23	Bulgarian First League	11	0	2	0	—		—		13	0
CSKA Sofia	Total		35	2	7	3	3	0	0	0	45	5
Pirin Blagoevgrad (loan)	2023–24	Bulgarian First League	0	0	0	0	—		—		0	0
Željezničar (loan)	2023–24	Bosnian Premier League	3	0	—		—		—		3	0
Skënderbeu	2024–25	Kategoria Superiore	22	5	0	0	—		—		22	5
Vllaznia(loan)	2025–26	Kategoria Superiore	–	–	–	–	—	—	1	0		
Career total			86	17	7	3	3	0	0	0	96	20

== Honours ==
CSKA Sofia

- Bulgarian Cup: 2020–21
