= Jordy Caicedo =

Ecuadorian footballer (born 1997)

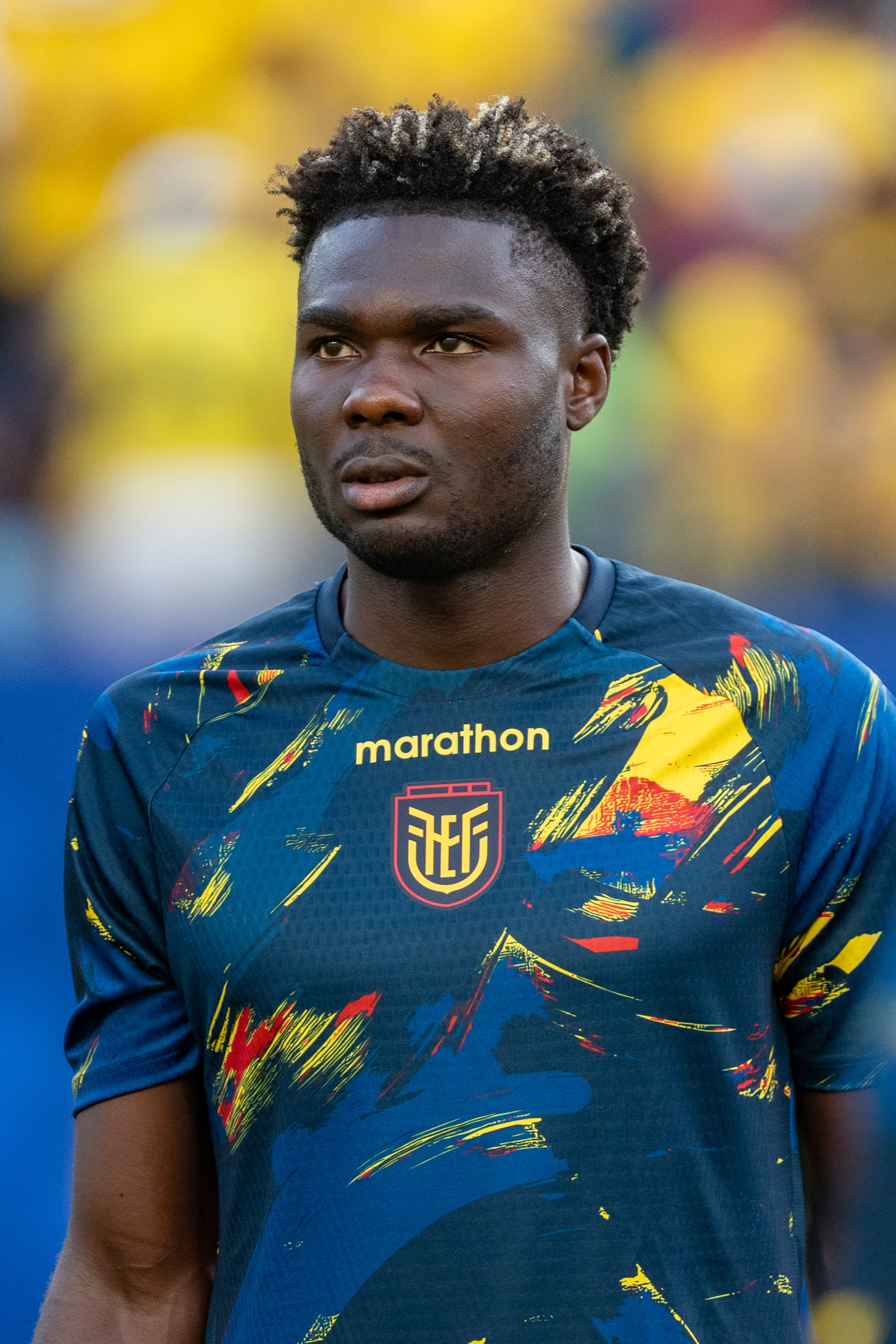
- Caicedo with Ecuador in 2026

Personal information
- Full name: Jordy Josué Caicedo Medina
- Date of birth: 18 November 1997 (age 29)
- Place of birth: Machala, Ecuador
- Height: 1.85 m (6 ft 1 in)
- Position: Striker

Team information
- Current team: Huracán (on loan from Atlas)
- Number: 9

Youth career
- 2011–2015: Norte América
- 2014: → Deportivo Azogues
- 2015–2018: Universidad Católica

Senior career*
Years	Team	Apps	(Gls)
2015–2018	Universidad Católica	54	(5)
2019	→ El Nacional (loan)	13	(7)
2019–2021	Vitória	42	(7)
2021–2022	CSKA Sofia	42	(23)
2022–2024	Tigres UANL	16	(1)
2023	→ Sivasspor (loan)	14	(3)
2023–2024	→ Atlas (loan)	25	(5)
2024–	Atlas	0	(0)
2024–2026	→ Sporting Gijón (loan)	34	(2)
2026–	→ Huracán (loan)	25	(13)

International career^{‡}
2017	Ecuador U20	13	(4)
2021–	Ecuador	28	(6)
- * Club domestic league appearances and goals as of 23:02, 19 September 2026 (UTC) ‡ National team caps and goals as of 17 November 2026

Jordy Josué Caicedo Medina (born 18 November 1997) is an Ecuadorian professional footballer who plays as a striker for Argentine club Huracán, on loan from Mexican club Atlas, and the Ecuador national team.

== Club career ==
Caicedo started playing football recreationally from an early age; he has said that he played football "in rich boy neighborhoods, bet money and always won." At the age of 15, he had an unsuccessful trial with Santos FC in Brazil. He has been compared to Ecuador international Felipe Caicedo. In February 2021, he joined Bulgarian club CSKA Sofia. In July 2022, Caicedo relocated to Mexico, signing a contract with Tigres UANL.

On 15 July 2024, Caicedo was loaned from Atlas to Spanish Segunda División side Sporting de Gijón, for one year.

== International career ==
Caicedo made his senior national team debut on 4 June 2021 in a World Cup qualifying match against Brazil. He substituted Enner Valencia in the 76th minute.

Caicedo made his debut in a professional tournament later that month in the 2021 Copa América, coming on as a second-half substitute in the opening match against Colombia. Caicedo scored his first goal for the senior national team on 25 March 2022, converting a penalty in another World Cup qualifying match against Paraguay in a 3–1 loss.

On 31 May 2026, Caicedo was selected in the 26-man squad for the 2026 FIFA World Cup.

== Career statistics ==
=== Club ===
As of matches played 19 September 2026

Appearances and goals by club, season and competition
Club	Season	League			National cup (Note: Includes Copa Ecuador, Copa do Brasil, Bulgarian Cup, Turkish Cup)		Continental		Other		Total	
Club	Season	Division	Apps	Goals	Apps	Goals	Apps	Goals	Apps	Goals	Apps	Goals
Universidad Católica	2015	LigaPro Serie A	4	0	—		—		—		4	0
Universidad Católica	2016	LigaPro Serie A	11	2	—		2 (Note: Appearances in Copa Sudamericana)	0	—		13	2
Universidad Católica	2017	LigaPro Serie A	25	3	—		3	1	—		28	4
Universidad Católica	2018	LigaPro Serie A	14	0	—		—		—		14	0
Universidad Católica	Total		54	5	0	0	5	1	—		59	6
El Nacional (loan)	2019	LigaPro Serie A	13	7	3	1	—		—		16	8
Vitória	2019	Série B	21	6	—		—		—		21	6
Vitória	2020	Série B	21	1	2	1	—		—		23	2
Vitória	Total		42	7	2	1	—		—		44	8
CSKA Sofia	2020–21	Bulgarian First League	14	7	5	3	—		—		19	10
CSKA Sofia	2021–22	Bulgarian First League	28	16	6	5	11 (Note: Appearances in UEFA Europa Conference League)	1	1 (Note: Appearance in Bulgarian Supercup)	0	46	22
CSKA Sofia	Total		42	23	11	8	11	1	1	0	65	32
Tigres UANL	2022–23	Liga MX	16	1	—		—		—		16	1
Sivasspor (loan)	2022–23	Süper Lig	14	3	1	0	2	0	—		17	3
Atlas (loan)	2023–24	Liga MX	25	5	—		—		—		25	5
Sporting Gijón (loan)	2024–25	Segunda División	24	2	2	0	—		—		26	2
Sporting Gijón (loan)	2025–26	Segunda División	10	0	3	0	—		—		13	0
Sporting Gijón (loan)	Total		34	2	5	0	—		—		39	2
Huracán (loan)	2026	AFA Liga Profesional de Fútbol	25	13	0	0	—		—		25	13
Career total			265	66	22	10	18	2	1	0	306	78

=== International ===
As of 17 November 2026

Ecuador
Year	Apps	Goals
2021	5	0
2022	5	2
2023	2	0
2024	5	1
2026	11	3
Total	28	6

List of international goals scored by Jordy Caicedo
No.	Date	Venue	Opponent	Score	Result	Competition
1	25 March 2022	Estadio Antonio Aranda, Ciudad del Este, Paraguay	Paraguay	1–3	1–3	2022 FIFA World Cup qualification
2	11 June 2022	DRV PNK Stadium, Fort Lauderdale, United States	Cape Verde	1–0	1–0	Friendly
3	12 June 2024	Subaru Park, Chester, United States	Bolivia	3–0	3–1	Friendly
4	7 June 2026	ScottsMiracle-Gro Field, Columbus, United States	Guatemala	1–0	3–0	Friendly
5	13 November 2026	Estadio Olímpico Atahualpa, Quito, Ecuador	Costa Rica	1–0	2–0	Friendly
6	17 November 2026	Estadio Monumental Banco Pichincha, Guayaquil, Ecuador	Bolivia	2–0	2–0	Friendly

== Honours ==
CSKA Sofia

- Bulgarian Cup: 2020–21

Individual

- Best foreign player in Bulgarian football for 2021 (shared with Jurgen Mattheij)
