= Jules Keita =

Guinean footballer

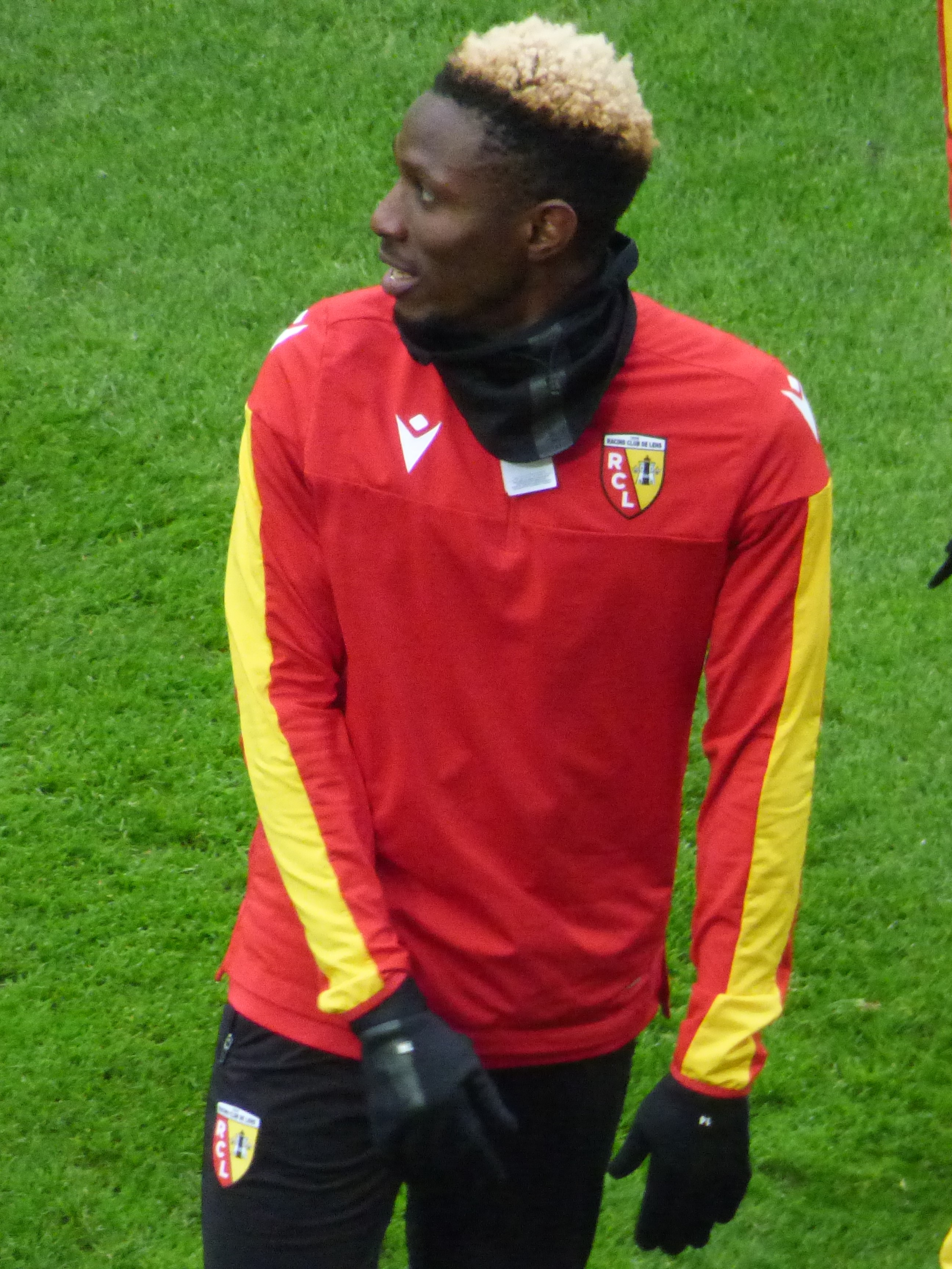
- Keita in 2019

Personal information
- Full name: Abdoulaye Jules Keita
- Date of birth: 20 July 1998 (age 28)
- Place of birth: Conakry, Guinea
- Height: 1.68 m (5 ft 6 in)
- Position: Winger

Team information
- Current team: AS Kaloum

Youth career
- –2016: FC Atouga
- 2016–2017: Bastia

Senior career*
Years	Team	Apps	(Gls)
2018–2019	Dijon	20	(2)
2019–2021	Lens	4	(0)
2020–2021	→ CSKA Sofia (loan)	14	(2)
2022–	AS Kaloum	0	(0)

International career^{‡}
2015	Guinea U-17	3	(0)
2017	Guinea U-20	3	(0)
2019–	Guinea	3	(1)
- * Club domestic league appearances and goals as of 13:02, 21 July 2022 (UTC) ‡ National team caps and goals as of 07:39, 23 February 2025 (UTC)

Abdoulaye Jules Keita (born 20 July 1998) is a Guinean professional footballer who plays as a midfielder for AS Kaloum.

Keita started his senior career at Dijon in Ligue 1, before joining Lens in September 2019.

== Club career ==
On 20 July 2020, Keita left Lens and joined Bulgarian club CSKA Sofia on a season-long loan. In June 2021, CSKA Sofia decided against exercising the purchase option and Keita returned to Lens.

== International career ==
Keita debuted for the Guinea national team in a 1–0 friendly loss to Comoros on 12 October 2019.

== Career statistics ==
=== Club ===
As of 1 July 2022

Appearances and goals by club, season and competition
Club	Season	League			Cup		League Cup		Continental		Other		Total	
Club	Season	Division	Apps	Goals	Apps	Goals	Apps	Goals	Apps	Goals	Apps	Goals	Apps	Goals
Dijon	2018–19	Ligue 1	17	2	4	1	0	0	—		—		21	3
Dijon	2019–20	Ligue 1	3	0	0	0	0	0	—		—		3	0
Dijon	Total		20	2	4	1	0	0	0	0	0	0	24	3
Lens	2019–20	Ligue 2	4	0	1	2	1	0	—		—		6	2
CSKA Sofia	2020–21	First League	14	2	1	0	–		6	1	–		21	3
Career total			38	4	6	3	1	0	6	1	0	0	51	8

=== International ===
As of match played 25 March 2024

Appearances and goals by national team and year
National team	Year	Apps	Goals
Guinea	2019	1	0
Guinea	2020	–	
Guinea	2021	–	
Guinea	2022	–	
Guinea	2023	–	
Guinea	2024	2	1
Total		3	1

Scores and results list Guinea's goal tally first, score column indicates score after each Keita goal.

List of international goals scored by Jules Keita
No.	Date	Venue	Opponent	Score	Result	Competition
1	25 March 2024	King Abdullah Sports City Stadium, Jeddah, Saudi Arabia	Bermuda	4–1	5–1	2024 FIFA Series

== Honours ==
CSKA Sofia

- Bulgarian Cup: 2020–21

Guinea U17

- Africa U-17 Cup of Nations bronze: 2015
