= Mitko Mitkov =

Bulgarian footballer

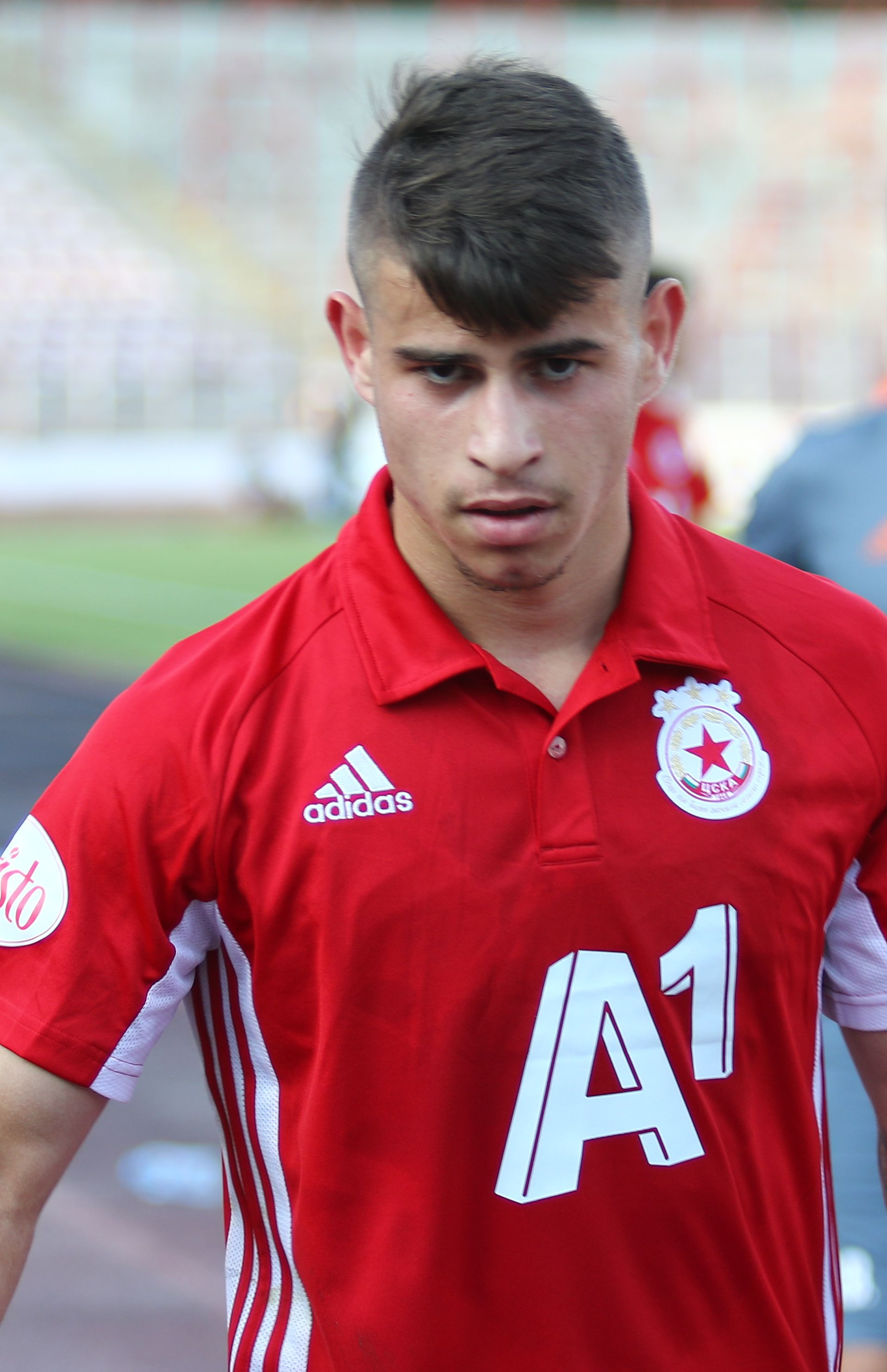

Personal information
- Full name: Mitko Stefanov Mitkov
- Date of birth: 28 August 2000 (age 26)
- Place of birth: Cherven Bryag, Bulgaria
- Height: 1.74 m (5 ft 9 in)
- Position: Winger

Team information
- Current team: Rilski Sportist
- Number: 8

Youth career
- –2016: Litex Lovech
- 2016–2019: CSKA Sofia

Senior career*
| Years | Team | Apps | (Gls) |
| 2017–2023 | CSKA Sofia | 7 | (1) |
| 2019 | → Litex Lovech (loan) | 11 | (1) |
| 2020 | → Dunav Ruse (loan) | 4 | (0) |
| 2021–2022 | → Litex Lovech (loan) | 23 | (5) |
| 2022–2023 | → Beroe (loan) | 4 | (0) |
| 2023–2025 | Septemvri Sofia | 61 | (3) |
| 2025–2026 | Lokomotiv Sofia | 7 | (0) |
| 2026– | Rilski Sportist | 0 | (0) |

International career
| 2016–2017 | Bulgaria U17 | 5 | (0) |
| 2018–2019 | Bulgaria U19 | 5 | (3) |
| 2019–2022 | Bulgaria U21 | 8 | (1) |
- * Club domestic league appearances and goals as of 11 June 2026

Mitko Mitkov (Bulgarian: Митко Митков; born 28 August 2000) is a Bulgarian professional footballer who plays as a midfielder for Second League club Rilski Sportist Samokov.

== Career ==
=== CSKA Sofia ===
On 31 May 2017 he made his debut for CSKA Sofia in а match against Dunav Ruse.

=== Bерое ===
After making only a few official appearances for CSKA Sofia, in September 2022 Mitkov was loaned out to Beroe.

== Career statistics ==
=== Club ===
As of 5 October 2024

| Club performance | | | League | | Cup | | Continental | | Other | | Total | |
| Club | League | Season | Apps | Goals | Apps | Goals | Apps | Goals | Apps | Goals | Apps | Goals |
| Bulgaria | | | League | | Bulgarian Cup | | Europe | | Other (Note: Includes Bulgarian Supercup matches.) | | Total | |
|---|---|---|---|---|---|---|---|---|---|---|---|---|
| CSKA Sofia | First League | 2016–17 | 1 | 0 | 0 | 0 | — | | — | | 1 | 0 |
| CSKA Sofia | First League | 2017–18 | 0 | 0 | 0 | 0 | — | | — | | 0 | 0 |
| CSKA Sofia | First League | 2019–20 | 2 | 1 | 0 | 0 | 2 | 0 | — | | 4 | 1 |
| CSKA Sofia | First League | 2020–21 | 4 | 0 | 2 | 0 | 0 | 0 | — | | 6 | 0 |
| CSKA Sofia | First League | 2021–22 | 0 | 0 | 0 | 0 | 0 | 0 | 0 | 0 | 0 | 0 |
| CSKA Sofia | Total | | 7 | 1 | 2 | 0 | 2 | 0 | 0 | 0 | 11 | 1 |
| Litex Lovech (loan) | Second League | 2018–19 | 11 | 1 | 0 | 0 | — | | — | | 11 | 1 |
| Litex Lovech (loan) | Second League | 2021–22 | 14 | 2 | 0 | 0 | — | | — | | 14 | 2 |
| Litex Lovech (loan) | Total | | 25 | 3 | 0 | 0 | 0 | 0 | 0 | 0 | 25 | 3 |
| Dunav Ruse (loan) | First League | 2019–20 | 4 | 0 | 0 | 0 | — | | — | | 4 | 0 |
| Beroe (loan) | First League | 2022–23 | 4 | 0 | 0 | 0 | — | | — | | 4 | 0 |
| Septemvri Sofia | First League | 2022–23 | 10 | 1 | 0 | 0 | — | | — | | 10 | 1 |
| Septemvri Sofia | Second League | 2023–24 | 20 | 1 | 1 | 0 | — | | — | | 21 | 1 |
| Septemvri Sofia | First League | 2024–25 | 9 | 0 | 0 | 0 | — | | — | | 9 | 0 |
| Septemvri Sofia | Total | | 39 | 2 | 1 | 0 | 0 | 0 | 0 | 0 | 40 | 2 |
| Career statistics | | | 79 | 6 | 3 | 0 | 2 | 0 | 0 | 0 | 84 | 6 |

== Honours ==
CSKA Sofia

- Bulgarian Cup: 2020–21
