= Henrique (footballer, born 1993) =

Brazilian footballer

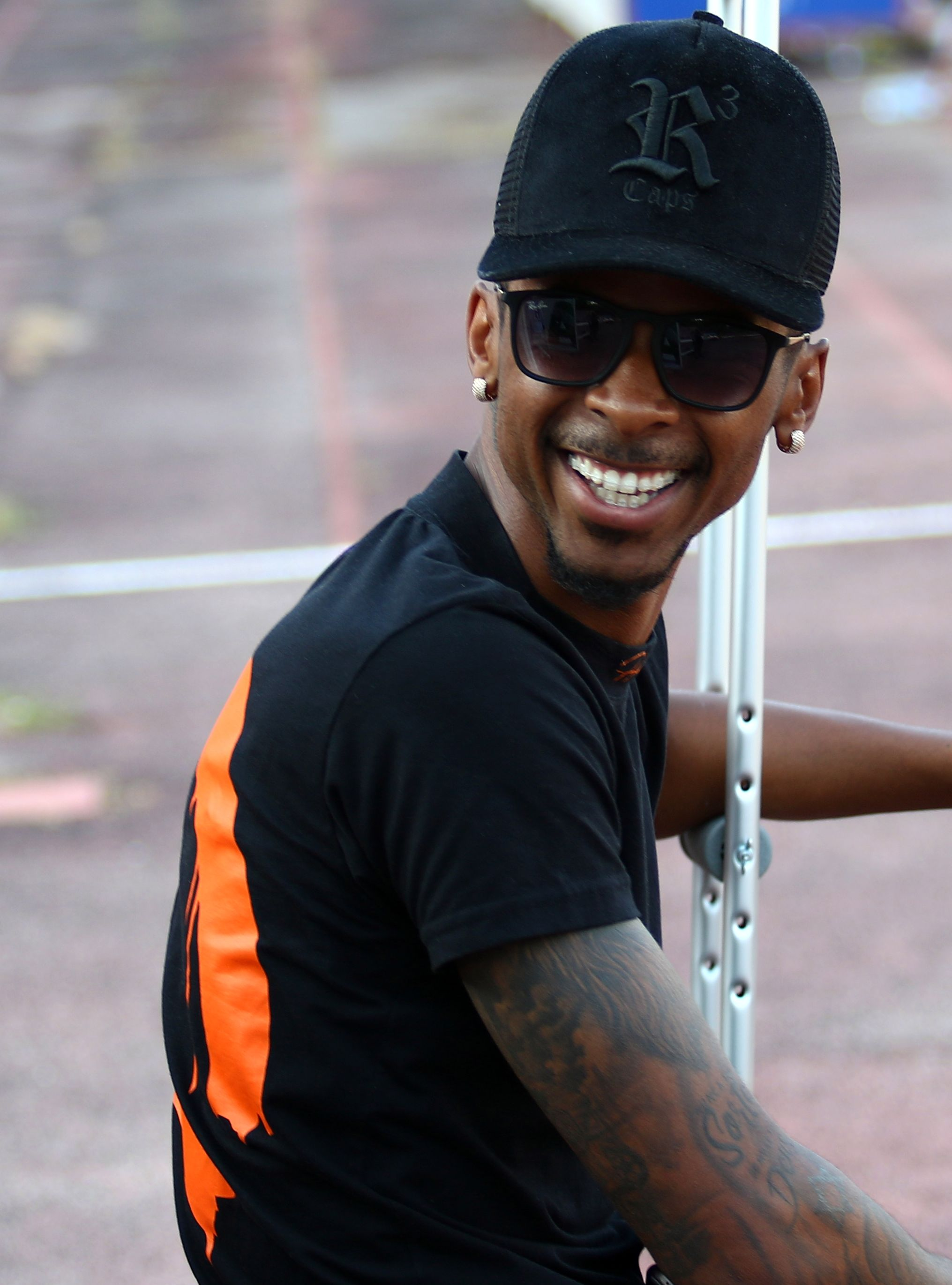

Personal information
- Full name: Henrique Roberto Rafael
- Date of birth: 23 August 1993 (age 33)
- Place of birth: Santa Rita do Sapucaí, Brazil
- Height: 1.78 m (5 ft 10 in)
- Positions: Winger; attacking midfielder

Team information
- Current team: Ypiranga
- Number: 17

Youth career
- 2009: Grêmio
- 2010: Internacional
- 2011–2013: Atlético Mineiro

Senior career*
Years	Team	Apps	(Gls)
2014–2018	Atlético Mineiro	3	(0)
2014	→ Ipatinga (loan)	3	(0)
2014–2015	→ XV de Piracicaba (loan)	8	(0)
2015	→ Paraná (loan)	28	(5)
2016	→ Bahia (loan)	8	(0)
2016	→ Paraná (loan)	16	(1)
2017	→ Novorizontino (loan)	9	(1)
2017–2018	→ CSKA Sofia (loan)	22	(4)
2018–2021	CSKA Sofia	47	(3)
2021–2022	Marítimo	26	(2)
2022–2023	CSKA 1948	11	(1)
2023	Sampaio Corrêa	12	(0)
2024–2025	Londrina	65	(3)
2026–	Ypiranga	6	(0)
- * Club domestic league appearances and goals as of 10 November 2026

Henrique Roberto Rafael (born 23 August 1993) is a Brazilian footballer who plays as a midfielder for Ypiranga.

== Club career ==
Born in Santa Rita do Sapucaí, Minas Gerais, Henrique was an Atlético Mineiro youth graduate, also training with the main squad in 2012. In 2014, he was loaned to Ipatinga, and made his senior debut on 2 August 2014 by starting in a 2–3 Série D home loss against Globo.

On 4 September 2014, Henrique joined XV de Piracicaba on loan until the end of the year. On 30 December, despite struggling with injuries, he renewed his contract for a further six months.

On 30 April 2015, Henrique signed for Paraná on loan until December. On 8 May he made his professional debut, starting and scoring the game's only in a home success against Ceará for the Série B championship.

Henrique finished the campaign with five goals and six assists in 28 appearances, being included in Galo's first team squad in the following year after his loan expired.

=== CSKA Sofia ===
On 17 June 2017, Henrique joined Bulgarian club CSKA Sofia on a season-long loan deal. He made 22 league appearances during his spell with the club and signed for CSKA permanently on a two-year contract for an undisclosed fee on 7 June 2018.

=== Marítimo ===
In June 2021, Henrique signed a contract with Primeira Liga club Marítimo.

=== CSKA 1948 ===
In June 2022, Henrique was heavily linked with returning to Bulgaria, but this time with CSKA 1948, managed by Lyuboslav Penev, with whom he worked in CSKA Sofia. On 29 June 2022 he officially signed a contract with the team.

== Career statistics ==
As of 19 May 2021

Club	Season	League			State League		Cup		Continental		Other		Total	
Club	Season	Division	Apps	Goals	Apps	Goals	Apps	Goals	Apps	Goals	Apps	Goals	Apps	Goals
Ipatinga	2014	Série D	3	0	—		—		—		—		3	0
XV de Piracicaba	2014	Paulista	—		—		—		—		6 (Note: Appearance(s) in Copa Paulista)	1	6	1
XV de Piracicaba	2015	Paulista	—		8	0	—		—		—		8	0
XV de Piracicaba	Subtotal		—		8	0	—		—		6	1	14	1
Paraná	2015	Série B	28	5	—		—		—		—		28	5
Atlético Mineiro	2016	Série A	—		2	0	—		0	0	1 (Note: Appearance(s) in Primeira Liga)	0	3	0
Bahia	2016	Série B	3	0	3	0	2	0	—		2 (Note: Appearance(s) in Copa do Nordeste)	0	10	0
Paraná	2016	Série B	16	1	—		—		—		—		16	1
Novorizontino	2017	Paulista	—		9	1	—		—		—		9	1
CSKA Sofia	2017–18	First League	22	4	—		3	0	—		—		25	4
CSKA Sofia	2018–19	First League	14	1	—		3	0	2	0	—		19	1
CSKA Sofia	2019–20	First League	11	0	—		4	0	0	0	—		15	0
CSKA Sofia	2020–21	First League	22	2	—		5	1	8	0	—		35	3
CSKA Sofia	Subtotal		69	7	—		15	1	10	0	—		94	8
Marítimo	2021–22	Primeira Liga	0	0	0	0	0	0	—		—		0	0
Career total			119	13	24	1	17	1	10	0	10	1	179	16

== Honours ==
CSKA Sofia

- Bulgarian Cup: 2020–21
