= Gorski Izvor, Haskovo Province =

Gorski Izvor
- Village
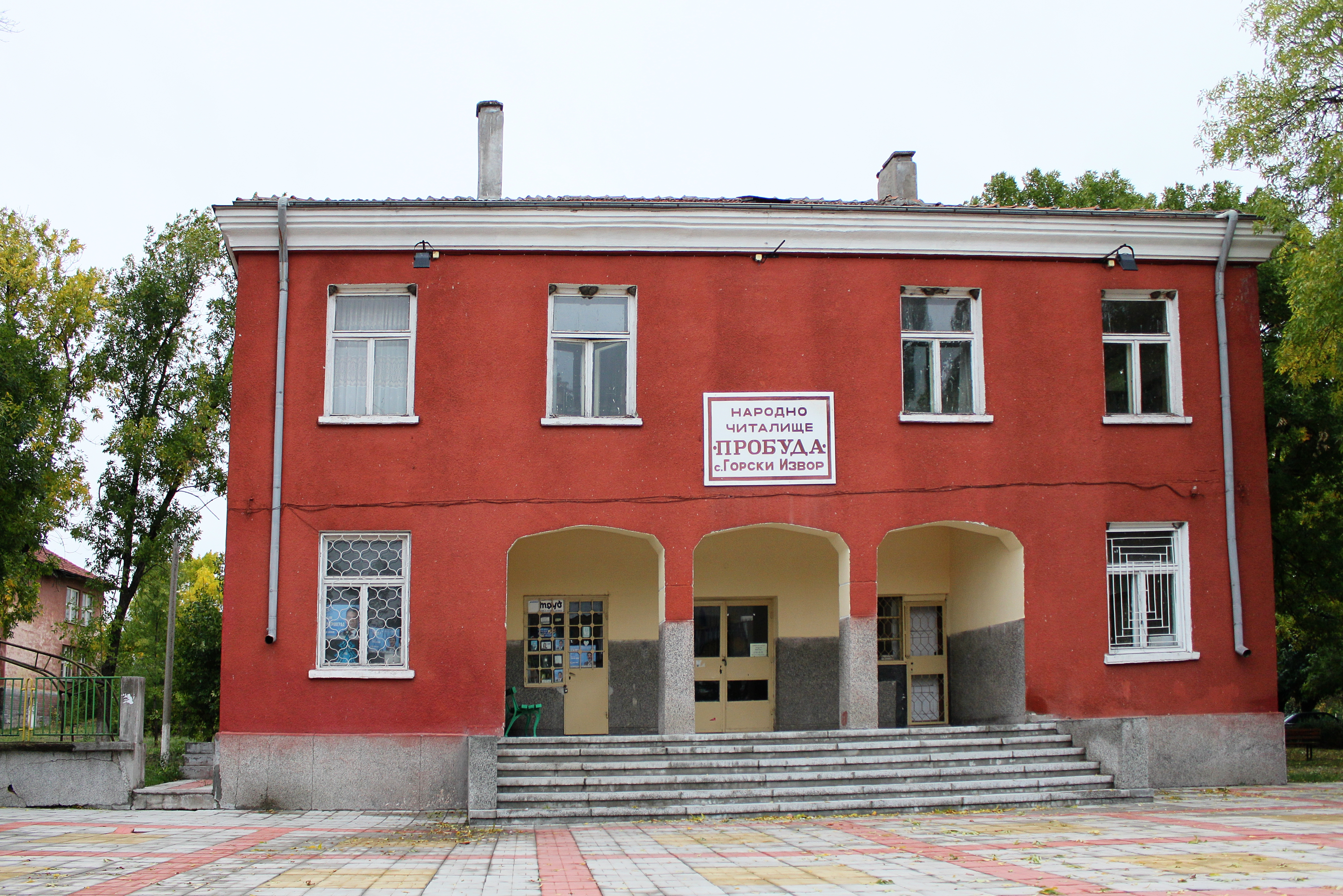
- Village hall

- Location in Bulgaria
- Coordinates: 42.021°N 25.422°E
- Country: Bulgaria
- Province: Haskovo Province
- Municipality: Dimitrovgrad
- Time zone: UTC+2 (EET)
  - Summer (DST): UTC+3 (EEST)

Gorski Izvor is a village in the municipality of Dimitrovgrad, in Haskovo Province, in southern Bulgaria.

== Etymology ==
Gorski Izvor (Bulgarian: Горски Извор) means Forest Spring in Bulgarian. The name is derived from the abundance of trees in the local area, along with where the village is situated - near a mountain - which grants it access to spring water.
