= Adam Boujamaa =

French footballer (born 1998)

Personal information
- Date of birth: 24 October 1998 (age 28)
- Place of birth: Toulouse, France
- Height: 1.80 m (5 ft 11 in)
- Position: Midfielder

Team information
- Current team: Blagnac

Youth career
- 2004–2005: Fonsorbes
- 2005–2010: Toulouse
- 2010–2011: Castanet
- 2011–2014: Toulouse Fontaines
- 2014–2016: Colomiers

Senior career*
Years	Team	Apps	(Gls)
2016	Colomiers	2	(0)
2016–2018	Guingamp B	19	(0)
2018–2020	Béziers	15	(0)
2019	Béziers B	7	(0)
2020–2021	MC Oujda	2	(0)
2021	Montana	4	(0)
2022	Toulon	5	(0)
2022–2023	Lyon-La Duchère		
2023	Balma		
2023–	Blagnac	24	(2)
- * Club domestic league appearances and goals as of 9 November 2024

Adam Boujamaa (born 24 October 1998) is a French professional footballer who plays as a midfielder for Championnat National 3 club Blagnac.

== Career ==
Boujamaa spent his youth with various academies in his native Toulouse, before moving to Bordeaux in 2016. He made his professional debut for in a 0–0 Ligue 2 tie with Gazélec Ajaccio on 29 March 2019.

On 13 January 2022, Boujamaa signed for Toulon.

== Personal life ==
Born in France, Boujamaa holds both French and Moroccan nationalities.
