= 2020–21 Bulgarian Cup =

Купа на България
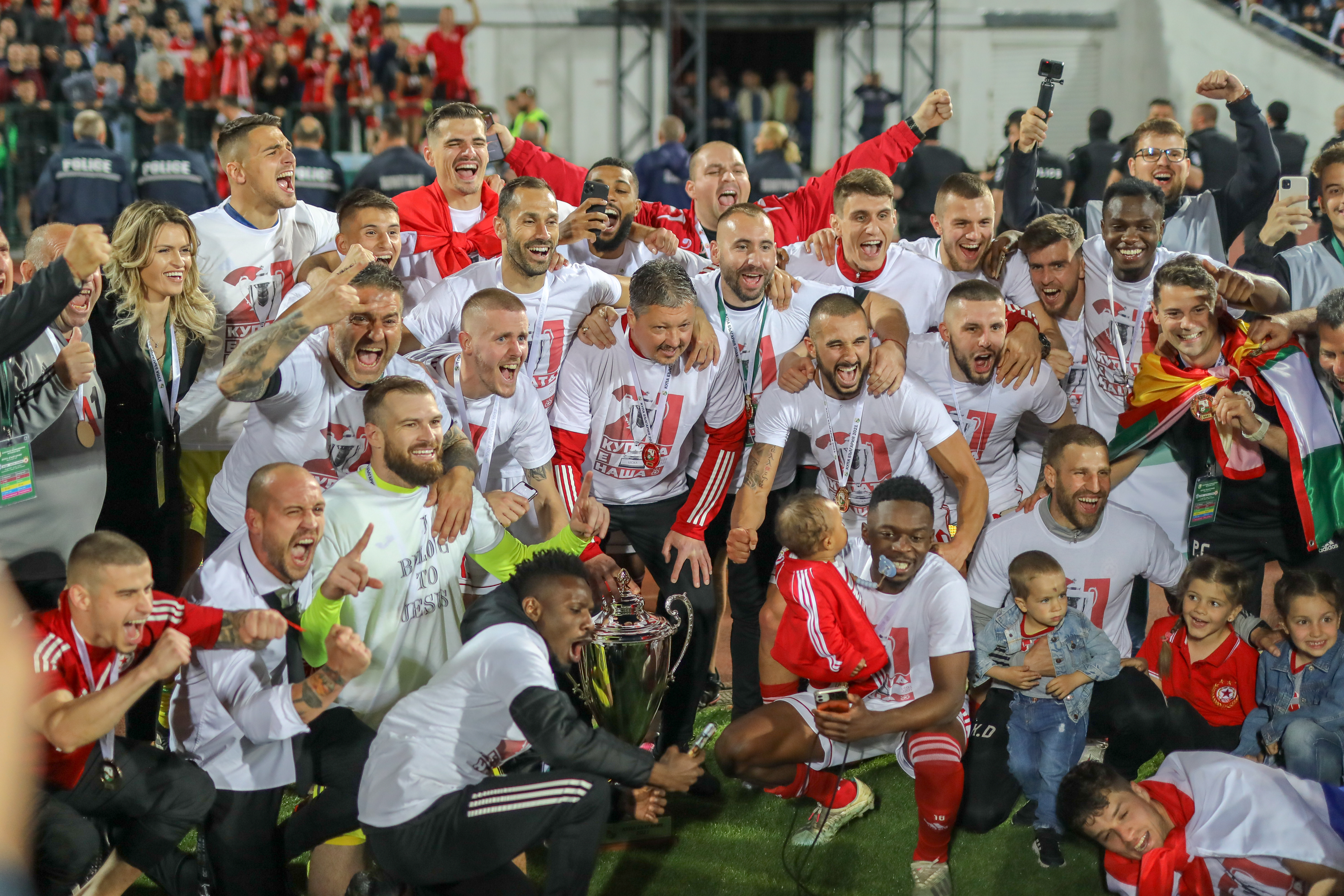
- CSKA Sofia celebrate their win

Tournament details
- Country: Bulgaria
- Teams: 45

Final positions
- Champions: CSKA Sofia (21st title)
- Runners-up: Arda Kardzhali

Tournament statistics
- Matches played: 47
- Goals scored: 148 (3.15 per match)
- Top goal scorer(s): eight players (3 goals each)
- All statistics correct as of 19 May 2021.

The 2020–21 Bulgarian Cup was the 39th official edition of the Bulgarian annual football knockout tournament. The competition began on 29 September 2020 with the preliminary round and finished with the final on 19 May 2021. Lokomotiv Plovdiv were the defending cup winners, but were eliminated after extra time by Ludogorets Razgrad in the quarter-finals. After CSKA Sofia missed out on the cup after losing last year's final, this time they won it against Arda Kardzhali for their 21st cup title and qualified for the second qualifying round of the 2021–22 UEFA Europa Conference League.

== Participating clubs ==
The following 46 teams qualified for the competition:

2020–21 First League; 14 clubs	2020–21 Second League; 16 non-reserve clubs	Winners of 4 regional competitions 16 clubs
Arda Kardzhali; Beroe Stara Zagora; Botev Plovdiv; Botev Vratsa; CSKA 1948 Sofia; CSKA Sofia; Cherno More Varna; Etar Veliko Tarnovo; Levski Sofia; Lokomotiv Plovdiv; Ludogorets Razgrad; Montana; Slavia Sofia; Tsarsko Selo Sofia	Dobrudzha Dobrich; Hebar Pazardzhik; Kariana Erden; Litex Lovech; Lokomotiv Gorna Oryahovitsa; Lokomotiv Sofia; Minyor Pernik; Neftochimic Burgas; Pirin Blagoevgrad; Septemvri Simitli; Septemvri Sofia; Sozopol; Sportist Svoge; Strumska Slava Radomir; Vitosha Bistritsa; Yantra Gabrovo	from North-East zone: Dunav Ruse; Chernomorets Balchik; Spartak Varna; Svetkavitsa Targovishte; from North-West zone: Chavdar Troyan; Drenovets; Partizan Cherven Bryag; Sevlievo; from South-West zone: Belasitsa Petrich; Botev Ihtiman; Nadezhda Dobroslavtsi; Oborishte Panagyurishte; from South-East zone: Izvor Gorski Izvor; Rodopa Smolyan; Sveti Nikola Burgas; Zagorets Nova Zagora

== Matches ==
=== Preliminary round ===
The draw was conducted on 16 September 2020. The games were played between 29 September and 1 October 2020. In this stage the participants were the 16 winners from the regional amateur competitions and 15 non-reserve teams from Second League. During the draw, Partizan Cherven Bryag received a bye to the first round.

Originally set for 30 September 2020, the tie between Chernomorets Balchik and Vitosha Bistritsa was cancelled because on 28 September, Vitosha Bistritsa declared that it had disbanded its first team squad and cancelled its participation in the Second League and the Bulgarian Cup. On 30 September, it was confirmed that Chernomorets Balchik had received a bye into the first round, due to Vitosha's inability to fulfill the fixture.

29 September 2020	Spartak Varna (III)	2–1	Lokomotiv Sofia (II)	Varna
16:00 EEST	Paskalev 32', 61'	Report	Petkov 35'	Stadium: Stadion Spartak; Referee: Dimitar Zhelyazkov (Silistra)

29 September 2020	Zagorets Nova Zagora (III)	2–1	Hebar Pazardzhik (II)	Nova Zagora
16:00 EEST	Videv 42'; Kostov 90'	Report	Chavorski 8'	Stadium: Stadion Zagorets; Referee: Vladimir Valkov (Plovdiv)

29 September 2020	Rodopa Smolyan (III)	0–2	Pirin Blagoevgrad (II)	Smolyan
16:00 EEST		Report	Pushkarov 81'; Dyulgerov 90+3'	Stadium: Stadion Septemvri; Referee: Nedelcho Gadzhalov (Plovdiv)

30 September 2020	Chavdar Troyan (IV)	0–4	Kariana Erden (II)	Troyan
16:00 EEST		Report	Tsekov 4'; Matheus 16'; Mendes 48'; Ignatov 68'	Stadium: Gradski stadion Referee: Ivan Ivanov (Sofia)

30 September 2020	Chernomorets Balchik (III)	w/o	Vitosha Bistritsa (II)	Balchik
16:00 EEST		Report		Stadium: Stadion Balchik; Referee: Krasen Georgiev (Varna)

30 September 2020	Botev Ihtiman (III)	2–0	Neftochimic Burgas (II)	Ihtiman
16:00 EEST	Kaptiev 18'; Kurdov 54'	Report		Stadium: Stadion Hristo Botev; Referee: Lyuboslav Lyubomirov (Sofia)

30 September 2020	Sevlievo (III)	6–0	Lokomotiv Gorna Oryahovitsa (II)	Sevlievo
16:00 EEST	Kanev 12', 20'; Petrov 16', 51'; Banov 55'; Stoyanov 86'	Report		Stadium: Stadion Rakovski; Referee: Georgi Davidov (Veliko Tarnovo)

30 September 2020	Nadezhda Dobroslavtsi (III)	2–1	Minyor Pernik (II)	Dobroslavtsi
16:00 EEST	Kitanov 43'; Arsovski 77'	Report	Yosifov 78'	Stadium: Stadion Nadezhda; Referee: Hristiyana Guteva (Sofia)

30 September 2020	Izvor Gorski Izvor (IV)	4–2	Septemvri Simitli (II)	Gorski Izvor
16:00 EEST	Milushev 22', 59' (pen.); Hristov 65', 90+2'	Report	Hazurov 87' (pen.); Mutafchiyski 90'	Stadium: Sayana Arena; Referee: Nikolay Ramunski (Sofia)

30 September 2020	Oborishte Panagyurishte (III)	1–0	Dobrudzha Dobrich (II)	Panagyurishte
16:00 EEST	Lovkov 56'	Report		Stadium: Stadion Orcho Voyvoda; Referee: Stefan Pavlov (Burgas)

30 September 2020	Svetkavitsa Targovishte (III)	1–4	Sozopol (II)	Targovishte
16:00 EEST	Iliev 12'	Report	Todorov 8', 44', 76'; Penev 89'	Stadium: Stadion Dimitar Burkov; Referee: Mihael Pavlov (Veliko Tarnovo)

30 September 2020	Drenovets (III)	2–1	Strumska Slava Radomir (II)	Drenovets
16:00 EEST	Iliev 86', 90+4'	Report	Dilchovski 90+3'	Stadium: Stadion Drenovets; Referee: Stiliyan Kolev (Veliko Tarnovo)

30 September 2020	Dunav Ruse (III)	0–2	Yantra Gabrovo (II)	Ruse
18:30 EEST		Report	Pisarov 23', 76'	Stadium: Gradski stadion Referee: Martin Velikov (Varna)

1 October 2020	Sveti Nikola Burgas (IV)	0–4	Sportist Svoge (II)	Pomorie
16:00 EEST		Report	Hristov 28'; Ramadan 33', 81'; Yanev 84'	Stadium: Stadion Pomorie; Referee: Kristiyan Kolev (Plovdiv)

1 October 2020	Belasitsa Petrich (III)	1–0	Litex Lovech (II)	Petrich
16:00 EEST	Taushanov 70' (pen.)	Report		Stadium: Stadion Tsar Samuil; Referee: Ivaylo Nenkov (Sofia)

=== Round of 32 ===
The draw was conducted on 16 September 2020. The games were played between 20 October and 14 November 2020. In this stage the participants were the 15 winners from the preliminary round, the team which received a bye to this round (Partizan Cherven Bryag) as well as the 14 teams from First League and the remaining best-placed team from Second League (Septemvri Sofia). During the draw, the winner of the preliminary round game between Belasitsa Petrich and Litex Lovech received a bye to the second round.

20 October 2020	Kariana Erden (II)	0–1	Tsarsko Selo Sofia (I)	Erden
15:00 EEST		Report	Pedro 68'	Stadium: Sporten kompleks Kariana; Referee: Ivelin Zanev (Ruse)

21 October 2020	Partizan Cherven Bryag (III)	1–4	Levski Sofia (I)	Cherven Bryag
14:30 EEST	L. Ivanov 34'	Report	Bojinov 36'; Dimitrov 42'; P. Petkov 65' (o.g.); M. D. Petkov 85'	Stadium: Gradski stadion Referee: Dimitar Dimitrov (Sofia)

21 October 2020	Sevlievo (III)	1–5	Slavia Sofia (I)	Sevlievo
15:00 EEST	Petrov 25'	Report	Bengyuzov 34'; Krastev 48' (pen.), 50'; Valchev 54'; Stoev 90'	Stadium: Stadion Rakovski; Referee: Dimo Dimov (Sliven)

21 October 2020	Izvor Gorski Izvor (IV)	1–2	Montana (I)	Gorski Izvor
15:00 EEST	Yankov 76'	Report	Tsvetkov 56' (pen.); Tasev 90+2'	Stadium: Sayana Arena; Referee: Vasil Minev (Sofia)

21 October 2020	Yantra Gabrovo (II)	1–6	Cherno More Varna (I)	Gabrovo
15:00 EEST	Mitev 7'	Report	Vilela 21', 71'; Isa 35' (pen.), 73'; Kiki 76'; Velev 87'	Stadium: Stadion Hristo Botev; Referee: Stefan Pavlov (Burgas)

21 October 2020	Drenovets (III)	0–6	CSKA 1948 Sofia (I)	Drenovets
15:00 EEST		Report	Bastunov 8', 25'; Belchev 13' (o.g.); Shopov 17'; Gushterov 45' (pen.); Aleksandrov 88'	Stadium: Stadion Drenovets; Referee: Petar Kuzev (Gabrovo)

21 October 2020	Pirin Blagoevgrad (II)	3–4	Beroe Stara Zagora (I)	Blagoevgrad
17:30 EEST	Yordanov 5', 45+2', 66'	Report	Makouta 41', 90+4' (pen.); Fall 81', 85'	Stadium: Stadion Hristo Botev; Referee: Nikolay Yordanov (Sofia)

22 October 2020	Chernomorets Balchik (III)	1–0	Septemvri Sofia (II)	Balchik
15:00 EEST	Dimov 4' (pen.)	Report		Stadium: Stadion Balchik; Referee: Mustafa Shefket (Kardzhali)

22 October 2020	Nadezhda Dobroslavtsi (III)	0–2	Botev Vratsa (I)	Dobroslavtsi
15:00 EEST		Report	Nenov 32'; Uzunov 36'	Stadium: Stadion Nadezhda; Referee: Ivaylo Nenkov (Sofia)

22 October 2020	Oborishte Panagyurishte (III)	0–4	Botev Plovdiv (I)	Panagyurishte
15:00 EEST		Report	Tonev 8'; Iliev 28'; Cissé 69', 78'	Stadium: Stadion Orcho Voyvoda; Referee: Georgi Ginchev (Veliko Tarnovo)
Note: The game has been played behind closed doors in accordance to an order by the mayor of Panagyurishte, Nikola Belishki, claiming the inability to provide adequate security and control during the game. On 10 November the disciplinary committee of the Bulgarian Football Union announced that this constituted a serious breach of its regulations and decided to exclude Oborishte Panagyurishte from participation on next year's edition of the Bulgarian Cup.

22 October 2020	Sozopol (II)	0–0 (a.e.t.) (2−4 p)	Etar Veliko Tarnovo (I)	Sozopol
15:00 EEST		Report		Stadium: Arena Sozopol; Referee: Krasen Georgiev (Varna)
	Penalties
	Moldovanov (penalty scored); K. Ivanov (penalty scored); Savov (penalty missed); Feradov (penalty missed)		(penalty scored) Angelov; (penalty scored) D. Pehlivanov; (penalty scored) Shterev; (penalty scored) H. Ivanov

3 November 2020	Zagorets Nova Zagora (III)	3–4 (a.e.t.)	Lokomotiv Plovdiv (I)	Nova Zagora
13:30 EET	P. Ivanov 20', 87', 115' (pen.)	Report	Iliev 24' (pen.); Y. Ivanov 30' (o.g.); Umarbayev 99'; Muslimović 110'	Stadium: Stadion Zagorets; Referee: Valentin Stanchev (Sliven)

4 November 2020	Spartak Varna (III)	1–2	Arda Kardzhali (I)	Varna
13:30 EET	Andreev 51'	Report	Knežević 21'; Delev 60'	Stadium: Stadion Spartak; Referee: Nikola Petrov (Lovech)

14 November 2020	Botev Ihtiman (III)	0–5	CSKA Sofia (I)	Sofia (Note: Due to the impact of the COVID-19 pandemic in Bulgaria and the organisational effort required to host the fixture, the teams exchanged the home rights to the match.)
15:45 EET		Report	Sowe 34'; Sinclair 55', 70'; Beltrame 64'; Ahmedov 76'	Stadium: Stadion Balgarska Armia; Referee: Hristiyana Guteva (Sofia)

11 February 2021	Sportist Svoge (II)	1–3	Ludogorets Razgrad (I)	Razgrad (Note: Upon request from Sportist Svoge regarding the organisational effort required to host the fixture, the teams exchanged the home rights to the match.)
14:30 EET	Hristov 48'	Report	Tekpetey 17', 57'; Keșerü 60'	Stadium: Huvepharma Arena; Referee: Ivelin Zanev (Ruse)
Note: The game was postponed till February 2021 due to an outbreak of COVID-19 cases within the Ludogorets squad.

=== Round of 16 ===
The draw was conducted on 18 December 2020. The games were played between 1 and 4 March 2021. In this stage the participants were the 15 winners from the previous round, as well as Belasitsa Petrich, which received a bye to this round.

1 March 2021	Lokomotiv Plovdiv (I)	2–1	Belasitsa Petrich (III)	Plovdiv
17:30 EET	Iliev 73' (pen.); Karagaren 87'	Report	Stoev 51'	Stadium: Stadion Lokomotiv; Attendance: 0 Referee: Vasil Minev (Sofia)

2 March 2021	Etar Veliko Tarnovo (I)	0–1	Arda Kardzhali (I)	Veliko Tarnovo
17:30 EET		Report	Tilev 33'	Stadium: Stadion Ivaylo; Attendance: 0 Referee: Stanimir Trenchev (Sofia)

2 March 2021	CSKA Sofia (I)	3–1	Cherno More Varna (I)	Sofia
17:30 EET	Bismark 9'; Yomov 39' (pen.), 49'	Report	Dimov 62'	Stadium: Stadion Balgarska Armia; Attendance: 0 Referee: Volen Chinkov (Sofia)

3 March 2021	Botev Plovdiv (I)	1–2 (a.e.t.)	CSKA 1948 Sofia (I)	Plovdiv
12:00 EET	Marquinhos 53'	Report	Chochev 16' (pen.); Mitkov 100'	Stadium: Futbolen kompleks Botev 1912; Attendance: 0 Referee: Georgi Davidov (Veliko Tarnovo)

3 March 2021	Tsarsko Selo Sofia (I)	1–2	Ludogorets Razgrad (I)	Sofia
15:00 EET	Mertens 59'	Report	Tchibota 33'; Anicet 45+2'	Stadium: Sporten kompleks Tsarsko Selo; Attendance: 0 Referee: Nikola Popov (Sofia)

3 March 2021	Levski Sofia (I)	3–1	Beroe Stara Zagora (I)	Sofia
18:00 EET	Robertha 38', 65' (pen.), 90+2'	Report	Kamburov 27' (pen.)	Stadium: Stadion Vivacom Arena - Georgi Asparuhov; Attendance: 0 Referee: Stanislav Todorov (Shumen)

4 March 2021	Botev Vratsa (I)	3–0	Chernomorets Balchik (III)	Vratsa
14:00 EET	Genov 78', 84' (pen.); Atanasov 90+1'	Report		Stadium: Stadion Hristo Botev; Attendance: 0 Referee: Blagoy Manov (Blagoevgrad)

4 March 2021	Slavia Sofia (I)	1–1 (a.e.t.) (5−3 p)	Montana (I)	Sofia
17:30 EET	Kirilov 90'	Report	Boujamaa 24'	Stadium: Stadion Slavia; Attendance: 0 Referee: Vladimir Valkov (Plovdiv)
	Penalties
	Tasevski (penalty scored); Kirilov (penalty scored); Sorakov (penalty scored); Aleksandrov (penalty scored); Krastev (penalty scored)		(penalty scored) Orachev; (penalty scored) Yordanov; (penalty scored) S. Georgiev; (penalty missed) Tsonkov

=== Quarter-finals ===
The draw was conducted on 4 March 2021. The games were played between 16 and 18 March 2021. In this stage the participants were the 8 winners from the previous round.

16 March 2021	Ludogorets Razgrad	2–1 (a.e.t.)	Lokomotiv Plovdiv	Razgrad
18:00 EET	Sotiriou 47'; Tchibota 114'	Report	Minchev 90+3'	Stadium: Huvepharma Arena; Attendance: 0 Referee: Dragomir Draganov (Varna)

17 March 2021	CSKA 1948 Sofia	0–1	Arda Kardzhali	Sofia
15:30 EET		Report	Delev 55'	Stadium: Natsionalen stadion Vasil Levski; Attendance: 0 Referee: Valentin Zhelezov (Burgas)

17 March 2021	Slavia Sofia	2–1	Levski Sofia	Sofia
18:30 EET	Makrillos 77'; Krastev 89'	Report	M. Petkov 86'	Stadium: Stadion Slavia; Attendance: 0 Referee: Radoslav Gidzhenov (Plovdiv)

18 March 2021	CSKA Sofia	4–0	Botev Vratsa	Sofia
17:00 EET	Caicedo 11', 39' (pen.), 75'; Bismark 78'	Report		Stadium: Stadion Balgarska Armia; Attendance: 0 Referee: Georgi Nikolov (Sofia)

=== Semi-finals ===
The draw was conducted on 18 March 2021. The first legs were played on 6 and 7 April, while the second legs are scheduled for 13 and 14 April 2021.

==== First legs ====
6 April 2021	Arda Kardzhali	0–0	Slavia Sofia	Kardzhali
19:30 EEST		Report		Stadium: Arena Arda; Attendance: 0 Referee: Stanislav Todorov (Shumen)

7 April 2021	CSKA Sofia	1–1	Ludogorets Razgrad	Sofia
19:30 EEST	Tiago 77'	Report	Cauly 83'	Stadium: Stadion Balgarska Armia; Attendance: 0 Referee: Volen Chinkov (Sofia)

==== Second legs ====
13 April 2021	Slavia Sofia	0–1 (0–1 agg.)	Arda Kardzhali	Sofia
18:30 EEST		Report	A. Petkov 26'	Stadium: Stadion Slavia; Attendance: 0 Referee: Dragomir Draganov (Varna)

14 April 2021	Ludogorets Razgrad	1–2 (2–3 agg.)	CSKA Sofia	Razgrad
18:30 EEST	Manu 72'	Report	Henrique 4'; Yomov 36'	Stadium: Huvepharma Arena; Attendance: 0 Referee: Georgi Kabakov (Plovdiv)

=== Final ===
19 May 2021
19:30 EEST

Arda Kardzhali	0–1	CSKA Sofia
	Report	Charles 85'

Vasil Levski National Stadium, Sofia
Attendance: 22,000
Referee: Volen Chinkov (Sofia)

== Bracket ==
Round of 32
3	Oborishte Panagyurishte	0
1	Botev Plovdiv	4
3	Drenovets	0
1	CSKA 1948 Sofia	6
2	Sozopol	0 (2)
1	Etar Veliko Tarnovo (p)	0 (4)
3	Spartak Varna	1
1	Arda Kardzhali	2
3	Sevlievo	1
1	Slavia Sofia	5
4	Izvor Gorski Izvor	1
1	Montana	2
3	Partizan Cherven Bryag	1
1	Levski Sofia	4
2	Pirin Blagoevgrad	3
1	Beroe Stara Zagora	4
3	Botev Ihtiman	0
1	CSKA Sofia	5
2	Yantra Gabrovo	1
1	Cherno More Varna	6
3	Nadezhda Dobroslavtsi	0
1	Botev Vratsa	2
3	Chernomorets Balchik	1
2	Septemvri Sofia	0
2	Kariana Erden	0
1	Tsarsko Selo Sofia	1
2	Sportist Svoge	1
1	Ludogorets Razgrad	3
3	Zagorets Nova Zagora	3
1	Lokomotiv Plovdiv (a.e.t.)	4
3	Belasitsa Petrich	bye

Round of 16
1	Botev Plovdiv	1
1	CSKA 1948 Sofia (a.e.t.)	2
1	Etar Veliko Tarnovo	0
1	Arda Kardzhali	1
1	Slavia Sofia (p)	1 (5)
1	Montana	1 (3)
1	Levski Sofia	3
1	Beroe Stara Zagora	1
1	CSKA Sofia	3
1	Cherno More Varna	1
1	Botev Vratsa	3
3	Chernomorets Balchik	0
1	Tsarsko Selo Sofia	1
1	Ludogorets Razgrad	2
1	Lokomotiv Plovdiv	2
3	Belasitsa Petrich	1

Quarter-finals
1	CSKA 1948 Sofia	0
1	Arda Kardzhali	1
1	Slavia Sofia	2
1	Levski Sofia	1
1	CSKA Sofia	4
1	Botev Vratsa	0
1	Ludogorets Razgrad (a.e.t.)	2
1	Lokomotiv Plovdiv	1

Semifinals
1	Arda Kardzhali	0	1
1	Slavia Sofia	0	0
1	CSKA Sofia	1	2
1	Ludogorets Razgrad	1	1

Final
1	Arda Kardzhali	0
1	CSKA Sofia	1

== Top goalscorers ==
As of 19 May 2021

Rank	Player	Club	Goals
1	(Ghana) Bismark Charles	CSKA Sofia	3
1	(Bulgaria) Georgi Yomov	CSKA Sofia	3
1	(Ecuador) Jordy Caicedo	CSKA Sofia	3
1	(Netherlands) Nigel Robertha	Levski Sofia	3
1	(Bulgaria) Kaloyan Krastev	Slavia Sofia	3
1	(Bulgaria) Preslav Yordanov	Pirin Blagoevgrad	3
1	(Bulgaria) Plamen Ivanov	Zagorets Nova Zagora	3
1	(Bulgaria) Dobrin Petrov	Sevlievo	3
9	eleven players		2
