= 2026–27 Third Amateur Football League (Bulgaria) =

Third Amateur Football League
- Season: 2026–27

The 2026–27 Third Amateur Football League season is the 77th of the Bulgarian Third Amateur League. The group is equivalent to the third level of the Bulgarian football pyramid, comprising four divisions based on geographical areas. These divisions are the North-West, North-East, South-East, and South-West. The number of teams in each division varies, similarly to previous seasons.

== Team Changes ==
To Third League

Promoted from Regional Leagues

- Botev Plovdiv II
- Etropole
- Krumovgrad
- National Sofia
- Septemvri Dragoevo
- Devnya 2005

Relegated from Second League

- Belasitsa Petrich
- Minyor Pernik
- Sevlievo

From Third League

Promoted to Second League

- Chernomorets Balchik
- Lokomotiv Mezdra
- Nesebar
- Rilski Sportist

Relegated to Regional Leagues

- Asenovets
- Germanea Sapareva Banya
- Lovech
- Pirin Gotse Delchev
- Rakovski
- Svetkavitsa Targovishte
- Vitosha Bistritsa

Not returning

- Spartak Varna II

== North-East Group ==
=== Stadia and Locations ===
Location of teams in 2026–27 North-East Third League

Team	City	Stadium	Capacity
Aksakovo	Aksakovo	Aksakovo Stadium	320
Benkovski	Isperih	Gradski Stadium	2,000
Botev	Novi Pazar	Hristo Botev Stadium	8,000
Chernomorets	Balchik	Balchik	2,600
Chernolomets	Popovo	Stamo Kostov Stadium	5,000
Cherno More II	Varna	Cherno More Sports Complex	1,500
Devnya 2005	Devnya	Povelyanovo Stadium	~
Dorostol	Silistra	Louis Eyer Stadium	12,000
Fratria II	Benkovski	Staro Oryahovo Stadium	500
Ludogorets III	Razgrad	Eagles' Nest	2,000
Olympic	Varna	Lokomotiv Stadium	2,000
Riltsi	Dobrich	Riltsi Stadium	650
Septemvri Dragoevo	Dragoevo	Dragoevo Stadium	~
Septemvri Tervel	Tervel	Septemvri Stadium	700
Svetkavitsa 2014	Targovishte	Sports complex "Nedelcho Kamov"	0
Volov	Shumen	Panayot Volov	3,500
Ustrem	Donchevo	Dobrich artificial pitch	1,000

=== League table ===
Pos	Team	Pld	W	D	L	GF	GA	GD	Pts	Promotion or relegation
1	Chernomorets Balchik	14	11	2	1	40	9	+31	35	Ineligible for promotion
2	Ludogorets III	14	11	2	1	31	6	+25	35	Promotion to Second League
3	Volov Shumen	15	11	2	2	41	13	+28	35	
4	Chernolomets Popovo	15	8	4	3	31	13	+18	28	
5	Benkovski Isperih	14	7	3	4	31	21	+10	24	
6	Septemvri Tervel	14	6	5	3	19	15	+4	23	
7	Svetkavitsa 2014 Targovishte	14	6	3	5	22	20	+2	21	
8	Cherno More II	13	5	3	5	23	15	+8	18	
9	Olympic Varna	14	6	0	8	24	30	−6	18	
10	Botev Novi Pazar	14	5	3	6	19	21	−2	18	
11	Septemvri Dragoevo	14	4	3	7	19	27	−8	15	
12	Riltsi Dobrich	13	4	2	7	14	25	−11	14	
13	Devnya 2005	14	4	1	9	12	29	−17	13	
14	Ustrem Donchevo	14	4	1	9	26	42	−16	13	
15	Aksakovo	13	2	4	7	19	32	−13	10	
16	Fratria II	13	3	0	10	13	39	−26	9	Ineligible for promotion
17	Dorostol Silistra	14	1	2	11	9	36	−27	5	Relegation to Regional Divisions

Updated to match(es) played on 21 November 2026. Source: tretaliga.bg
Rules for classification: 1) Points; 2) Head-to-head points; 3) Head-to-head goal difference; 4) Head-to-head goals scored; 5) Head-to-head away goals scored (only if two teams); 6) Goal difference; 7) Goals scored; 8) Fairplay ranking; 9) Draw.

=== Results ===
Home \ Away	AKS	BEN	BNP	CHB	CHE	CHM	DEV	DOR	FRA	LUD	OLY	RIL	SED	SEP	SVT	VOL	UST
Aksakovo	—			1–4				0–2			3–2			1–1	6–0	1–1	
Benkovski Isperih	4–1	—	3–0	2–0				5–1		0–1				2–2			3–2
Botev Novi Pazar	3–0		—	0–0						0–0				0–1	2–1	0–4	5–1
Chernomorets Balchik				—				7–0			4–3			2–0	1–0	2–1	7–0
Chernolomets Popovo	1–1	5–1	4–0	0–0	—		3–1		3–0			6–0	1–0				
Cherno More II	3–1	4–2	1–1	0–1	4–1	—	4–0				0–0	2–2					
Devnya 2005	1–1	0–3		0–4			—	3–0		0–3		1–0					2–1
Dorostol Silistra					1–1	1–1		—	1–2				0–1	0–1	0–4	0–3	
Fratria II		2–1	3–6	2–5			1–0		—	0–1		0–1					1–2
Ludogorets III	6–1					2–1		3–0		—	5–1			3–0		2–1	2–1
Olympic Varna		1–3	1–0		1–3		2–0				—	2–0	4–1				
Riltsi Dobrich			2–0	0–3				1–0		0–3		—				0–1	4–1
Septemvri Dragoevo	4–2	1–1	0–2				0–2		4–1	0–0		4–2	—				
Septemvri Tervel					0–0	1–0	5–2		2–1		1–2		3–0	—		1–1	
Svetkavitsa 2014 Targovishte		1–1			0–1	1–0			4–0	1–0	3–0	2–2	1–1		—		
Volov Shumen					2–1	2–1	2–0		9–0		2–1		4–1		4–1	—	
Ustrem Donchevo					2–1			4–3			3–4		4–2	1–1	2–3	2–4	—

Updated to match(es) played on 21 November 2026. Source: Bulgarian Football
Legend: Blue = home team win; Yellow = draw; Red = away team win.
For upcoming matches, an "a" indicates there is an article about the rivalry between the two participants.

== South-East Group ==
=== Stadia and Locations ===
Plovdiv 2026–27 Third League football clubs
Location of teams in 2026–27 South-East Third League

Team	City	Stadium	Capacity
Atletik Kuklen	Kuklen	Atletik Stadium	1,000
Botev Plovdiv II	Plovdiv	Starika	3,000
Dimitrovgrad	Dimitrovgrad	Minyor Stadium	10,000
Gigant Saedinenie	Saedinenie	Saedinenie Stadium	5,000
Haskovo	Haskovo	Haskovo Stadium	9,000
Krumovgrad	Krumovgrad	Stadium Krumovgrad	3,000
Levski Karlovo	Karlovo	Vasil Levski Stadium	3,000
Lokomotiv Plovdiv II	Plovdiv	Stadion Plovdiv	55,000
Maritsa Milevo	Milevo	Milevo Stadium	0
Neftochimic Burgas	Burgas	Lazur Stadium	18,037
Rodopa Smolyan	Smolyan	Septemvri Stadium	6,000
Rozova Dolina	Kazanlak	Sevtopolis Stadium	15,000
Sekirovo	Rakovski	Parchevich Stadium	1,500
Sozopol	Sozopol	Arena Sozopol	3,500
Spartak Plovdiv	Plovdiv	Sport Complex Spartak	0
Yambol 1915	Yambol	Tundzha Stadium	18,000
Zagorets	Nova Zagora	Stadion Zagorets	5,900

=== League table ===
Pos	Team	Pld	W	D	L	GF	GA	GD	Pts	Promotion or relegation
1	Krumovgrad	16	15	0	1	48	13	+35	45	Promotion to Second League
2	Spartak Plovdiv	16	13	0	3	36	17	+19	39	
3	Maritsa Milevo	16	12	1	3	36	15	+21	37	
4	Yambol 1915	16	10	2	4	42	19	+23	32	
5	Neftochimic Burgas	16	8	4	4	25	15	+10	28	
6	Haskovo	16	7	4	5	26	22	+4	25	
7	Rodopa Smolyan	16	7	4	5	23	23	0	25	
8	Dimitrovgrad	16	7	2	7	27	22	+5	23	
9	Gigant Saedinenie	16	7	1	8	24	26	−2	22	
10	Sozopol	16	7	1	8	28	33	−5	22	
11	Rozova Dolina	16	4	7	5	23	25	−2	19	
12	Botev Plovdiv II	16	4	6	6	20	24	−4	18	
13	Lokomotiv Plovdiv II	16	5	2	9	18	36	−18	17	
14	Zagorets	16	4	2	10	18	32	−14	14	
15	Atletik Kuklen	16	4	2	10	15	31	−16	14	
16	Sekirovo	16	3	3	10	29	46	−17	12	
17	Maritsa Plovdiv	16	3	2	11	14	30	−16	11	Relegation to Regional Divisions
18	Levski Karlovo	16	2	1	13	12	35	−23	7	Relegation to Regional Divisions

Updated to match(es) played on 21 November 2026. Source: tretaliga.bg
Rules for classification: 1) Points; 2) Head-to-head points; 3) Head-to-head goal difference; 4) Head-to-head goals scored; 5) Head-to-head away goals scored (only if two teams); 6) Goal difference; 7) Goals scored; 8) Fairplay ranking; 9) Draw.

=== Results ===
Home \ Away	ATL	BOT	DIM	GIS	HAS	KRU	LEV	LPD	MAM	MAR	NEF	ROD	ROZ	SEK	SOZ	SPA	YAM	ZAG
Atletik Kuklen	—			2–0		1–3	2–0				0–0		3–3	2–0	1–0	0–3	0–7	
Botev Plovdiv II		—				0–2	1–0						0–0	2–2	0–0	1–2	0–2	
Dimitrovgrad	2–1	0–1	—	4–1	0–3			3–1	0–1	0–0		5–1						2–0
Gigant Saedinenie		5–2		—		0–2		3–0	1–2					2–1	2–1		0–1	1–0
Haskovo	2–0	1–1		4–2	—		2–0	0–1		2–2			1–1			1–2		3–1
Krumovgrad			4–3		6–0	—		6–0		4–0	4–2			6–1				2–1
Levski Karlovo			0–3	3–0		0–1	—				1–1		1–2	2–3	1–4	1–3	1–5	
Lokomotiv Plovdiv II	2–0	2–2					2–0	—	0–5			0–3	3–1		1–2		0–1	
Maritsa Milevo		4–2				0–4			—				2–0		4–2	2–0	2–1	0–0
Maritsa Plovdiv	3–0	2–1		0–1	1–2		1–2	1–2	0–3	—						0–2		1–0
Neftochimic Burgas		0–2	0–1		2–0			3–0	2–0	3–0	—	0–0						2–0
Rodopa Smolyan	1–0	2–2		1–0	0–0		3–0		1–0	5–3		—						1–3
Rozova Dolina			2–2	2–2		0–1					1–3	1–1	—	4–3	3–0		1–1	
Sekirovo					2–3			5–3	0–4	0–3	2–2	2–1		—		2–4		1–2
Sozopol			3–1		3–2	1–2					4–2	0–2		3–2	—			2–1
Spartak Plovdiv			2–0	1–4		2–0					0–1	2–0	2–0		4–3	—	3–1	
Yambol 1915			2–1			2–3				3–0	0–2	5–1		3–3	5–0		—	
Zagorets	4–3	0–3					2–0	1–1	0–4							1–4	2–3	—

Updated to match(es) played on 21 November 2026. Source: Bulgarian Football
Legend: Blue = home team win; Yellow = draw; Red = away team win.
For upcoming matches, an "a" indicates there is an article about the rivalry between the two participants.

== North-West Group ==
=== Stadia and Locations ===
Location of teams in 2026–27 North-West Third League

Team	City	Stadium	Capacity
Akademik Svishtov	Svishtov	Akademik Stadium	13,500
Bdin Vidin	Vidin	Georgi Benkovski	15,000
Chavdar Troyan	Troyan	Chavdar Stadium	5,000
Etar Veliko Tarnovo II	Veliko Tarnovo	Trifon Ivanov Playground	0
Juventus Malchika	Malchika	Georgi Karchev	1,000
Kom Berkovitsa	Berkovitsa	Mramor Stadium	3,000
Levski	Levski	Levski Stadium	6,000
Lokomotiv Mezdra	Mezdra	Lokomotiv Stadium	3,000
Lovech	Lovech	Gradski Stadium	6,824
Partizan Cherven Bryag	Cherven Bryag	Gradski Stadium	1,500
Pavlikeni	Pavlikeni	Gancho Panov	10,000
Sevlievo	Sevlievo	Rakovski	5,000
Spartak Pleven II	Pleven	Pleven	22,000
Yantra Polski Trumbesh	Polski Trumbesh	Gradski Stadium	2,000

=== League table ===
Pos	Team	Pld	W	D	L	GF	GA	GD	Pts	Promotion or relegation
1	Akademik Svishtov	11	7	4	0	21	6	+15	25	Promotion to Second League
2	Lokomotiv Mezdra	10	5	5	0	21	10	+11	20	
3	Kom Berkovitsa	11	5	5	1	22	13	+9	20	
4	Sevlievo	11	5	4	2	19	10	+9	19	
5	Bdin Vidin	11	5	0	6	22	23	−1	15	
6	Yantra Polski Trumbesh	11	3	4	4	23	24	−1	13	
7	Levski	11	3	3	5	14	19	−5	12	
8	Chavdar Troyan	11	3	3	5	11	16	−5	12	
9	Etar Veliko Tarnovo II	10	3	2	5	23	20	+3	11	
10	Spartak Pleven II	11	2	4	5	24	34	−10	10	
11	Pavlikeni	11	3	1	7	12	19	−7	10	
12	Partizan Cherven Bryag	11	2	3	6	8	26	−18	9	
13	Juventus Malchika (R, D)	0	0	0	0	0	0	0	−3 (Note: On September 23, 2026, Juventus 95 (Malchika) was expelled from the group due to a second failure to appear for a match without a valid reason. Its results were annulled.)	Disqualified

Updated to match(es) played on 21 November 2026. Source: tretaliga.bg
Rules for classification: 1) Points; 2) Head-to-head points; 3) Head-to-head goal difference; 4) Head-to-head goals scored; 5) Head-to-head away goals scored (only if two teams); 6) Goal difference; 7) Goals scored; 8) Fairplay ranking; 9) Draw.
(D) Disqualified; (R) Relegated

=== Results ===
Home \ Away	AKA	BDI	CHA	ETA	LEV	LOM	KOM	PAV	PAR	SEV	SPA	YAN
Akademik Svishtov	—	4–1	4–2	3–2		0–0		2–1				
Bdin Vidin		—	3–1	2–1		0–1	2–5	3–2				
Chavdar Troyan			—	2–2		0–2	0–1	1–0		1–0		
Etar Veliko Tarnovo II				—	4–1		2–2			2–1	9–3	1–3
Levski	0–2	2–1	0–0		—				4–0		3–3	3–2
Lokomotiv Mezdra					3–0	—	4–0				3–2	
Kom Berkovitsa	0–0				1–1		—		5–0	0–0	2–1	2–2
Pavlikeni				2–0	1–0	2–2	1–4	—		0–1		
Partizan Cherven Bryag	0–0	0–4	1–2	1–0		2–2		2–0	—			
Sevlievo	0–0	2–1			2–0	2–2			6–0	—	2–2	3–2
Spartak Pleven II	0–4	2–4	1–1					4–1	1–0		—	5–5
Yantra Polski Trumbesh	0–2	3–1	2–1			2–2		0–2	2–2			—

Updated to match(es) played on 21 November 2026. Source: Bulgarian Football
Legend: Blue = home team win; Yellow = draw; Red = away team win.
For upcoming matches, an "a" indicates there is an article about the rivalry between the two participants.

== South-West Group ==
=== Stadia and locations ===
Location of teams in 2023–24 South-West Third League
Sofia 2026–27 South-West Third League football clubs

Team	City	Stadium	Capacity
Balkan	Botevgrad	Hristo Botev	8,000
Bansko	Bansko	Saint Peter	3,000
Belasitsa	Petrich	Tsar Samuil	12,000
Botev	Ihtiman	Hristo Botev	5,000
CSKA Sofia III	Sofia	Pancharevo	1,500
Etropole	Etropole	Chavdar Stadium	5,600
Kostinbrod	Kostinbrod	Georgi Benkovski	500
Kyustendil	Kyustendil	Osogovo	10,000
Levski Sofia II	Sofia	Georgi Asparuhov Training Complex	1,000
Minyor Pernik	Pernik	Minyor	8,000
National Sofia	Sofia	NSA Stadium	2,500
Oborishte	Panagyurishte	Orcho Voyvoda	3,000
Pirin Razlog	Razlog	Gradski Stadium	50,000
Septemvri Sofia II	Sofia	German	800
Septemvri Simitli	Simitli	Struma	8,000
Slavia Sofia II	Sofia	Aleksandar Shalamanov	25,556
Slivnishki Geroy	Slivnitsa	Slivnishki Geroy	7,000
Strumska Slava	Radomir	Hristo Radovanov Stadium	5,000

=== League table ===
Pos	Team	Pld	W	D	L	GF	GA	GD	Pts	Promotion or relegation
1	Minyor Pernik	18	14	3	1	46	7	+39	45	Promotion to Second League
2	Bansko	18	12	3	3	34	20	+14	39	
3	Oborishte	18	11	5	2	34	14	+20	38	
4	Strumska Slava	17	9	4	4	30	21	+9	31	
5	Slivnishki Geroy	18	8	4	6	24	22	+2	28	
6	Balkan Botevgrad	18	8	2	8	20	21	−1	26	
7	Belasitsa	18	7	4	7	29	26	+3	25	
8	Septemvri Sofia II	16	7	2	7	16	18	−2	23	
9	Slavia Sofia II	18	6	5	7	23	22	+1	23	
10	Kostinbrod	18	7	1	10	27	27	0	22	
11	Levski Sofia II	18	5	6	7	23	26	−3	21	
12	Septemvri Simitli	18	5	6	7	25	29	−4	21	
13	Kyustendil	18	5	5	8	18	23	−5	20	
14	Botev Ihtiman	18	5	4	9	19	24	−5	19	
15	Etropole	18	5	2	11	18	41	−23	17	
16	CSKA Sofia III	17	3	8	6	13	15	−2	17	Ineligible for promotion
17	National Sofia	18	4	5	9	24	37	−13	17	Relegation to Regional Divisions
18	Pirin Razlog	18	4	1	13	14	44	−30	13	Relegation to Regional Divisions

Updated to match(es) played on 21 November 2026. Source: tretaliga.bg
Rules for classification: 1) Points; 2) Head-to-head points; 3) Head-to-head goal difference; 4) Head-to-head goals scored; 5) Head-to-head away goals scored (only if two teams); 6) Goal difference; 7) Goals scored; 8) Fairplay ranking; 9) Draw.

=== Results ===
Home \ Away	BAL	BAN	BEL	BOT	CSS	ETR	KOS	KYU	LEV	MIN	NAT	PIZ	OBO	SEP	SES	SLA	SLI	STR
Balkan Botevgrad	—			1–0	1–0				1–0	1–4	1–3		2–1		1–2		2–2	0–1
Bansko	1–1	—	4–1	1–0		3–0			2–0			3–1	0–4		3–1		2–0	
Belasitsa	1–2		—		0–2	4–1	0–1		4–5		2–1	4–0		2–1			3–2	
Botev Ihtiman			1–2	—	2–1		1–0			0–2	3–2		0–2	1–2	2–2	0–0		
CSKA Sofia III		1–2			—	0–0	1–0	1–1				0–1	0–1			3–2		0–0
Etropole	1–0	0–1		1–4		—			1–3	0–5	4–2		1–1		4–2		2–1	
Kostinbrod	0–1	3–3				5–0	—	3–1				5–1		1–3	0–2	1–0		2–3
Kyustendil	0–1	0–3	0–0	1–0		3–1		—	2–2			0–1					2–1	1–2
Levski Sofia II				3–1	0–0		1–2		—	0–2	0–0		0–2	1–1	2–1	2–2		
Minyor Pernik		1–2	1–1		1–0		3–0	2–0		—	1–0			3–0		5–1		5–2
National Sofia		2–2			2–2		2–1	1–1		0–6	—	2–1		1–2		2–0		0–3
Pirin Razlog	0–5		1–3	1–0		1–0			1–2	0–3		—	2–4		1–1		1–2	
Oborishte			1–0		1–1		3–0	2–2		0–0	3–1		—	2–0		1–2		3–2
Septemvri Sofia II	2–0	0–1		0–0		0–1		1–0				2–1		—		1–0	1–2	
Septemvri Simitli			1–1		0–0		2–0	1–2		0–2	3–3		1–3	2–0	—	1–1		
Slavia Sofia II	1–0	2–1	0–0			4–0		0–2	1–0			5–0				—	1–2	1–1
Slivnishki Geroy				2–3	1–1		0–3	1–0	1–0	0–0	2–0		0–0		3–1		—	
Strumska Slava	2–0	3–0	2–1	1–1		2–1			2–2			3–0			1–2		0–2	—

Updated to match(es) played on 21 November 2026. Source: Bulgarian Football
Legend: Blue = home team win; Yellow = draw; Red = away team win.
For upcoming matches, an "a" indicates there is an article about the rivalry between the two participants.
