= 2025–26 Third Amateur Football League (Bulgaria) =

Third Amateur Football League
- Season: 2025–26
- Promoted: Nesebar; Rilski Sportist
- Relegated: Asenovets; Germanea Sapareva Banya; Lovech; Pirin Gotse Delchev; Rakovski; Svetkavitsa Targovishte; Vitosha Bistritsa

The 2025–26 Third Amateur Football League season is the 76th of the Bulgarian Third Amateur League. The group is equivalent to the third level of the Bulgarian football pyramid, comprising four divisions based on geographical areas. These divisions are the North-West, North-East, South-East, and South-West. The number of teams in each division varies, similarly to previous seasons.

== Team Changes ==
To Third League

Promoted from Regional Leagues

- Germanea Sapareva Banya
- Kostinbrod
- Neftochimic Burgas
- Olympic Varna
- Rakovski
- Svetkavitsa 2014
- Troyan

Relegated from Second League

- Nesebar
- Lovech
- Strumska Slava

From Third League

Promoted to Second League

- Chernomorets Burgas
- Sevlievo
- Vihren Sandanski

Relegated to Regional Leagues

- Botev Plovdiv III
- CSKA 1948 III
- Granit
- Karnobat
- Kubrat
- Lokomotiv Dryanovo
- Pirin Blagoevgrad II

Not returning

- Svilengrad
- Vihar Slavyanovo

== North-East Group ==
=== Stadia and Locations ===
Location of teams in 2025–25 North-East Third League

Team	City	Stadium	Capacity
Aksakovo	Aksakovo	Aksakovo Stadium	320
Benkovski	Isperih	Gradski Stadium	2,000
Botev	Novi Pazar	Hristo Botev Stadium	8,000
Chernolomets	Popovo	Stamo Kostov Stadium	5,000
Cherno More II	Varna	Cherno More Sports Complex	1,500
Chernomorets	Balchik	Balchik	2,600
Dorostol	Silistra	Louis Eyer Stadium	12,000
Fratria II	Benkovski	Staro Oryahovo Stadium	500
Ludogorets III	Razgrad	Eagles' Nest	2,000
Olympic	Varna	Lokomotiv Stadium	2,000
Riltsi	Dobrich	Riltsi Stadium	650
Septemvri	Tervel	Septemvri Stadium	700
Spartak II	Varna	Lokomotiv Stadium	2,000
Svetkavitsa	Targovishte	Dimitar Burkov	5,000
Svetkavitsa 2014	Targovishte	Sports complex "Nedelcho Kamov"	0
Volov	Shumen	Panayot Volov	3,500
Ustrem	Donchevo	Dobrich artificial pitch	1,000

=== League table ===
Pos	Team	Pld	W	D	L	GF	GA	GD	Pts	Promotion or relegation
1	Chernomorets Balchik (Note: Chernomorets Balchik declined promotion due to financial and organizational reasons;) (C)	32	27	4	1	92	14	+78	85	Promotion to Second League
2	Ludogorets III	32	25	4	3	101	19	+82	79	Ineligible for promotion
3	Septemvri Tervel	32	25	3	4	89	22	+67	78	
4	Volov Shumen	32	23	3	6	93	28	+65	72	
5	Chernolomets Popovo	32	20	3	9	78	43	+35	63	
6	Benkovski Isperih	32	18	6	8	68	40	+28	60	
7	Cherno More II	32	16	7	9	65	44	+21	55	
8	Ustrem Donchevo	32	17	3	12	73	67	+6	54	
9	Olympic Varna	32	10	6	16	58	80	−22	36	
10	Aksakovo	32	9	4	19	40	68	−28	31	
11	Fratria II	32	8	6	18	40	71	−31	30	Ineligible for promotion
12	Svetkavitsa 2014 Targovishte	32	7	8	17	26	48	−22	29	
13	Botev Novi Pazar	32	8	5	19	34	69	−35	29	
14	Dorostol Silistra	32	8	4	20	29	67	−38	28	
15	Spartak Varna II	32	7	5	20	42	72	−30	26	
16	Riltsi Dobrich	32	6	4	22	31	83	−52	22	
17	Svetkavitsa Targovishte (Note: On March 13 2026 Svetkavitsa Targovishte declined further participation. Its results still count and its opponents until the end of the season are awarded 3:0 wins.) (R, D)	32	0	1	31	5	129	−124	1	Relegation to Regional Divisions

Updated to match(es) played on 30 May 2026. Source: tretaliga.bg
Rules for classification: 1) Points; 2) Head-to-head points; 3) Head-to-head goal difference; 4) Head-to-head goals scored; 5) Head-to-head away goals scored (only if two teams); 6) Goal difference; 7) Goals scored; 8) Fairplay ranking; 9) Draw.
(C) Champions; (D) Disqualified; (R) Relegated

=== Results ===
Home \ Away	AKS	BEN	BNP	CHE	CHB	CHM	DOR	FRA	LUD	OLY	RIL	SEP	SVE	SVT	SVN	VOL	UST
Aksakovo	—	0–1	2–1	0–4	0–3	3–4	2–2	3–1	0–3	0–0	2–0	2–5	3–0	1–0	2–3	0–2	2–3
Benkovski Isperih	4–2	—	4–1	3–0	1–0	0–2	1–0	2–0	1–0	5–0	3–0	0–2	10–1	0–0	1–0	0–2	2–2
Botev Novi Pazar	2–1	2–4	—	3–3	0–4	1–3	0–0	3–3	1–3	2–1	1–0	1–2	1–1	1–0	2–0	0–3	2–1
Chernolomets Popovo	3–0	1–1	3–0	—	1–2	3–4	3–0	2–0	0–3	3–1	3–1	3–0	6–1	1–1	7–1	2–1	3–0
Chernomorets Balchik	3–0	3–1	4–0	4–0	—	2–2	4–0	3–0	1–0	4–1	3–0	1–1	6–0	2–0	2–0	3–0	4–1
Cherno More II	2–1	1–1	3–1	1–3	0–4	—	1–2	1–2	2–4	3–3	3–0	0–2	5–1	5–0	3–0	1–0	1–2
Dorostol Silistra	4–0	0–3	0–2	0–4	0–3	1–3	—	0–1	0–9	2–3	1–0	0–3	3–0	0–0	2–0	0–1	1–0
Fratria II	1–1	1–2	3–2	1–6	0–1	1–1	0–1	—	0–4	1–3	8–1	0–4	1–0	2–0	3–0	0–7	2–4
Ludogorets III	1–0	3–2	6–0	3–1	1–1	0–0	1–1	1–0	—	8–0	3–0	1–1	1–0	2–0	4–0	3–1	9–0
Olympic Varna	0–2	4–1	3–0	0–2	1–4	0–2	4–2	3–3	2–7	—	2–1	0–4	11–0	3–1	2–2	1–2	1–2
Riltsi Dobrich	1–1	1–1	2–0	0–2	0–7	2–2	2–0	2–2	0–1	0–2	—	0–1	3–0	2–1	4–3	0–5	2–4
Septemvri Tervel	3–2	4–1	2–0	0–4	0–1	2–0	6–0	2–1	0–1	8–0	5–0	—	9–0	1–0	4–1	1–0	4–1
Svetkavitsa Targovishte	0–2	0–3	0–3	0–3	0–3	0–3	1–3	0–3	0–3	0–3	0–4	0–3	—	0–1	0–2	0–3	0–5
Svetkavitsa 2014 Targovishte	2–3	0–1	2–0	0–1	0–3	0–0	1–0	2–0	0–1	2–2	3–0	0–3	3–0	—	1–1	1–1	2–1
Spartak Varna II	1–2	3–5	2–1	5–0	0–1	0–3	2–1	0–0	1–2	1–1	3–1	1–2	3–0	1–1	—	2–4	1–3
Volov Shumen	4–1	2–2	3–0	5–0	2–2	2–1	3–2	5–0	3–2	2–0	9–0	0–1	5–0	2–0	4–0	—	4–3
Ustrem Donchevo	5–0	3–2	1–1	2–1	1–5	1–3	4–1	5–0	1–3	4–1	3–1	0–0	3–0	4–1	4–3	0–6	—

Updated to match(es) played on 30 May 2026. Source: Bulgarian Football
Legend: Blue = home team win; Yellow = draw; Red = away team win.
For upcoming matches, an "a" indicates there is an article about the rivalry between the two participants.

== South-East Group ==
=== Stadia and Locations ===
Plovdiv 2025–26 Third League football clubs
Location of teams in 2025–26 South-East Third League

Team	City	Stadium	Capacity
Asenovets	Asenovgrad	Shipka Stadium	4,000
Atletik Kuklen	Kuklen	Atletik Stadium	1,000
Dimitrovgrad	Dimitrovgrad	Minyor Stadium	10,000
Gigant Saedinenie	Saedinenie	Saedinenie Stadium	5,000
Haskovo	Haskovo	Haskovo Stadium	9,000
Levski Karlovo	Karlovo	Vasil Levski Stadium	3,000
Lokomotiv Plovdiv II	Plovdiv	Stadion Plovdiv	55,000
Maritsa Milevo	Milevo	Milevo Stadium	0
Neftochimic Burgas	Burgas	Lazur Stadium	18,037
Nesebar	Nesebar	Nesebar Stadium	7,000
Rakovski	Rakovski	G.S Rakovski Stadium	3,000
Rodopa Smolyan	Smolyan	Septemvri Stadium	6,000
Rozova Dolina	Kazanlak	Sevtopolis Stadium	15,000
Sekirovo	Rakovski	Parchevich Stadium	1,500
Sozopol	Sozopol	Arena Sozopol	3,500
Spartak Plovdiv	Plovdiv	Sport Complex Spartak	0
Yambol 1915	Yambol	Tundzha Stadium	18,000
Zagorets	Nova Zagora	Stadion Zagorets	5,900

=== League table ===
Pos	Team	Pld	W	D	L	GF	GA	GD	Pts	Promotion or relegation
1	Nesebar (C, P)	36	29	4	3	116	22	+94	91	Promotion to Second League
2	Maritsa Plovdiv	36	23	6	7	90	40	+50	75	
3	Neftochimic Burgas	36	19	9	8	53	39	+14	66	
4	Yambol 1915	36	20	6	10	72	41	+31	66	
5	Levski Karlovo	36	20	5	11	64	53	+11	65	
6	Maritsa Milevo	36	17	9	10	64	32	+32	60	
7	Spartak Plovdiv	36	15	9	12	64	58	+6	54	
8	Sozopol	36	16	6	14	50	38	+12	54	
9	Haskovo	36	15	7	14	52	48	+4	52	
10	Zagorets	36	13	10	13	52	60	−8	49	
11	Rozova Dolina	36	14	6	16	45	52	−7	48	
12	Gigant Saedinenie	36	14	5	17	56	59	−3	47	
13	Rodopa Smolyan	36	14	4	18	51	70	−19	46	
14	Atletik Kuklen	36	13	3	20	43	78	−35	42	
15	Sekirovo	36	9	8	19	30	53	−23	35	
16	Dimitrovgrad	36	10	5	21	42	82	−40	35	
17	Lokomotiv Plovdiv II	36	9	6	21	44	53	−9	33	
18	Rakovski (R)	36	8	3	25	46	94	−48	27	Relegation to Regional Divisions
19	Asenovets (R)	36	6	5	25	30	92	−62	23	Relegation to Regional Divisions

Updated to match(es) played on 30 May 2026. Source: tretaliga.bg
Rules for classification: 1) Points; 2) Head-to-head points; 3) Head-to-head goal difference; 4) Head-to-head goals scored; 5) Head-to-head away goals scored (only if two teams); 6) Goal difference; 7) Goals scored; 8) Fairplay ranking; 9) Draw.
(C) Champions; (P) Promoted; (R) Relegated

=== Results ===
Home \ Away	ASE	ATL	DIM	GIS	HAS	LEV	LPD	MAM	MAR	NEF	NES	RAK	ROD	ROZ	SEK	SOZ	SPA	YAM	ZAG
Asenovets	—	1–0	1–0	0–2	0–3	1–5	1–2	2–2	0–5	1–2	1–2	1–0	1–2	4–2	2–1	1–4	1–0	1–2	1–1
Atletik Kuklen	2–1	—	3–2	3–2	3–1	3–1	1–2	0–5	1–4	1–3	0–1	3–1	0–2	0–1	0–1	2–1	2–4	2–1	0–2
Dimitrovgrad	3–1	2–3	—	0–4	0–0	2–2	4–3	0–3	0–1	0–2	2–1	3–4	3–2	1–0	0–3	3–2	2–2	2–1	3–1
Gigant Saedinenie	4–1	5–1	0–2	—	0–2	1–0	1–4	1–0	1–1	3–0	1–2	1–0	1–2	0–1	3–0	1–0	0–1	1–0	4–2
Haskovo	0–0	4–0	4–0	2–2	—	2–1	1–0	0–1	1–2	1–2	0–0	2–3	3–0	1–0	2–0	2–0	2–1	2–2	2–0
Levski Karlovo	4–1	4–0	1–0	3–2	2–1	—	2–1	3–1	1–2	1–2	0–3	2–1	1–1	3–2	2–0	3–1	1–0	0–5	5–2
Lokomotiv Plovdiv II	3–0	0–1	4–1	1–1	1–0	2–3	—	0–1	1–1	0–3	1–2	5–0	2–1	1–1	5–0	0–0	1–1	0–1	1–2
Maritsa Milevo	4–0	4–1	1–2	2–0	4–1	0–0	2–0	—	2–1	2–1	1–0	4–0	2–0	1–1	1–1	0–0	7–1	0–1	1–1
Maritsa Plovdiv	5–0	2–0	4–1	3–2	4–3	2–0	0–0	0–3	—	4–0	0–5	5–1	5–0	2–1	4–1	3–0	2–2	5–0	9–1
Neftochimic Burgas	3–0	1–1	2–0	3–0	0–0	1–1	2–1	2–2	0–1	—	1–1	3–1	3–1	1–1	2–0	0–0	1–0	1–1	0–2
Nesebar	8–1	4–0	5–0	7–2	4–0	6–0	3–0	2–1	1–0	3–0	—	9–0	8–0	4–0	5–2	0–0	6–1	3–1	3–0
Rakovski	2–0	1–0	1–0	4–5	1–2	3–2	2–1	1–0	2–3	1–3	0–4	—	2–2	3–3	0–1	0–1	0–1	2–5	2–2
Rodopa Smolyan	4–0	4–0	2–1	3–2	2–1	1–1	2–0	0–1	1–4	2–0	1–3	3–0	—	3–2	4–2	0–1	3–2	0–3	1–1
Rozova Dolina	4–0	2–4	1–1	2–0	3–1	0–1	2–0	0–0	1–0	0–1	1–0	3–2	2–1	—	2–1	1–0	1–2	0–2	2–1
Sekirovo	2–0	1–1	0–0	1–1	1–1	0–2	1–0	3–1	0–1	0–0	1–2	1–0	1–0	0–1	—	0–1	2–1	1–3	1–2
Sozopol	1–1	2–3	5–0	0–1	1–0	0–2	3–0	2–1	2–1	1–3	1–2	4–1	4–1	2–1	1–0	—	0–0	3–1	4–0
Spartak Plovdiv	2–2	0–1	7–2	3–2	5–0	1–3	2–1	2–2	3–1	3–1	0–0	3–2	3–0	4–0	0–0	2–1	—	0–3	0–0
Yambol 1915	2–1	1–1	4–0	3–0	1–2	2–0	4–1	1–0	1–1	2–3	1–3	4–2	4–0	3–1	2–0	0–0	4–2	—	1–2
Zagorets	2–2	5–0	2–0	0–0	2–3	1–2	1–0	2–1	2–2	0–1	2–4	3–1	1–0	2–0	1–1	2–0	2–3	0–0	—

Updated to match(es) played on 30 May 2026. Source: Bulgarian Football
Legend: Blue = home team win; Yellow = draw; Red = away team win.
For upcoming matches, an "a" indicates there is an article about the rivalry between the two participants.

== North-West Group ==
=== Stadia and Locations ===
Location of teams in 2025–26 North-West Third League

Team	City	Stadium	Capacity
Akademik Svishtov	Svishtov	Akademik Stadium	13,500
Bdin Vidin	Vidin	Georgi Benkovski	15,000
Etar Veliko Tarnovo II	Veliko Tarnovo	Trifon Ivanov Playground	0
Juventus Malchika	Malchika	Georgi Karchev	1,000
Kom Berkovitsa	Berkovitsa	Mramor Stadium	3,000
Levski	Levski	Levski Stadium	6,000
Lokomotiv Mezdra	Mezdra	Lokomotiv Stadium	3,000
Lovech	Lovech	Gradski Stadium	6,824
Partizan Cherven Bryag	Cherven Bryag	Gradski Stadium	1,500
Pavlikeni	Pavlikeni	Gancho Panov	10,000
Troyan	Troyan	Chavdar Stadium	5,000
Yantra Polski Trumbesh	Polski Trumbesh	Gradski Stadium	2,000

=== League table ===
Pos	Team	Pld	W	D	L	GF	GA	GD	Pts	Promotion or relegation
1	Lokomotiv Mezdra (Note: Lokomotiv Mezdra declined promotion due to financial and organizational reasons;) (C)	22	19	1	2	62	20	+42	58	Promotion to Second League
2	Akademik Svishtov	22	17	3	2	40	11	+29	54	
3	Kom Berkovitsa	22	13	6	3	46	22	+24	45	
4	Bdin Vidin	22	14	1	7	57	26	+31	43	
5	Partizan Cherven Bryag	22	8	6	8	25	25	0	30	
6	Pavlikeni	22	9	3	10	29	24	+5	30	
7	Etar Veliko Tarnovo II	22	8	5	9	32	31	+1	29	
8	Yantra Polski Trumbesh	22	6	6	10	37	47	−10	24	
9	Levski	22	6	5	11	32	35	−3	23	
10	Troyan	22	5	1	16	20	56	−36	16	
11	Juventus Malchika	22	2	1	19	14	72	−58	7	
12	Lovech (Note: On March 4 2026 Lovech declined further participation. Its results still count and its opponents until the end of the season are awarded 3:0 wins.) (R, D)	22	6	0	16	18	43	−25	18	Relegation to Regional Divisions

Updated to match(es) played on 23 May 2026. Source: tretaliga.bg
Rules for classification: 1) Points; 2) Head-to-head points; 3) Head-to-head goal difference; 4) Head-to-head goals scored; 5) Head-to-head away goals scored (only if two teams); 6) Goal difference; 7) Goals scored; 8) Fairplay ranking; 9) Draw.
(C) Champions; (D) Disqualified; (R) Relegated

=== Results ===
Home \ Away	AKA	BDI	ETA	LEV	JUV	KOM	LOM	LOV	PAV	PAR	TRO	YAN
Akademik Svishtov	—	1–0	1–0	2–0	3–0	1–1	1–0	3–0	2–0	1–0	4–1	2–0
Bdin Vidin	1–2	—	4–1	2–1	6–0	3–0	1–4	0–2	1–0	2–1	7–0	5–2
Etar Veliko Tarnovo II	0–3	2–0	—	3–3	2–0	1–1	1–2	3–0	0–1	3–0	4–2	2–3
Levski	0–2	1–3	2–2	—	6–0	1–2	0–3	3–0	0–3	0–0	3–1	3–3
Juventus Malchika	1–2	2–8	1–3	0–2	—	0–2	1–5	0–3	2–2	1–3	0–4	0–1
Kom Berkovitsa	0–0	3–2	1–1	2–1	5–1	—	4–2	3–0	4–1	0–3	4–1	3–0
Lokomotiv Mezdra	2–1	3–2	2–1	2–0	3–0	2–0	—	3–0		2–0	6–0	5–3
Lovech	2–3	0–3	2–0	3–0	0–3	0–3	0–2	—	2–0	0–3	0–3	0–1
Pavlikeni	1–0	0–1	0–1	1–2	3–0	0–0	1–2	3–0	—	0–0	3–0	6–2
Partizan Cherven Bryag	1–1	0–0	3–1	1–0	0–1	1–1	1–3	1–0	2–1	—	3–0	2–5
Troyan	0–1	0–2	0–1	0–4	3–1	0–4	1–4	0–4	0–1	2–0	—	1–0
Yantra Polski Trumbesh	1–4	1–4	0–0	0–0	6–0	2–4	2–2	3–0	0–2	1–1	1–1	—

Updated to match(es) played on 23 May 2026. Source: Bulgarian Football
Legend: Blue = home team win; Yellow = draw; Red = away team win.
For upcoming matches, an "a" indicates there is an article about the rivalry between the two participants.

== South-West Group ==
=== Stadia and locations ===
Location of teams in 2023–24 South-West Third League
Sofia 2025–26 South-West Third League football clubs

Team	City	Stadium	Capacity
Balkan	Botevgrad	Hristo Botev	8,000
Bansko	Bansko	Saint Peter	3,000
Botev	Ihtiman	Hristo Botev	5,000
CSKA Sofia III	Sofia	Pancharevo	1,500
Germanea	Sapareva Banya	Sapareva Banya Stadium	500
Kostinbrod	Kostinbrod	Georgi Benkovski	500
Kyustendil	Kyustendil	Osogovo	10,000
Levski Sofia II	Sofia	Georgi Asparuhov Training Complex	1,000
Oborishte	Panagyurishte	Orcho Voyvoda	3,000
Pirin Razlog	Razlog	Gradski Stadium	50,000
Pirin Gotse Delchev	Gotse Delchev	Gradski Stadium	5,000
Rilski Sportist	Samokov	Iskar	7,000
Septemvri Sofia II	Sofia	German	800
Septemvri Simitli	Simitli	Struma	8,000
Slavia Sofia II	Sofia	Aleksandar Shalamanov	25,556
Slivnishki Geroy	Slivnitsa	Slivnishki Geroy	7,000
Strumska Slava	Radomir	Hristo Radovanov Stadium	5,000
Vitosha	Bistritsa	Bistritsa	2,500

=== League table ===
Pos	Team	Pld	W	D	L	GF	GA	GD	Pts	Promotion or relegation
1	Rilski Sportist (C, P)	34	25	5	4	58	23	+35	80	Promotion to Second League
2	Strumska Slava	34	20	5	9	71	45	+26	65	
3	Slavia Sofia II	34	17	6	11	68	44	+24	57	
4	Botev Ihtiman	34	14	9	11	53	40	+13	51	
5	Kyustendil	34	15	5	14	49	52	−3	50	
6	CSKA Sofia III	34	15	5	14	49	43	+6	50	Ineligible for promotion
7	Oborishte	34	14	7	13	43	37	+6	49	
8	Balkan Botevgrad	34	13	10	11	50	45	+5	49	
9	Septemvri Sofia II	34	13	9	12	50	43	+7	48	
10	Septemvri Simitli	34	13	8	13	41	40	+1	47	
11	Kostinbrod	34	14	5	15	47	51	−4	47	
12	Pirin Razlog	34	13	6	15	43	48	−5	45	
13	Bansko	34	11	11	12	39	45	−6	44	
14	Slivnishki Geroy	34	11	9	14	40	49	−9	42	
15	Levski Sofia II	34	11	7	16	30	44	−14	40	
16	Pirin Gotse Delchev (R)	34	11	4	19	43	70	−27	37	Relegation to Regional Divisions
17	Germanea Sapareva Banya (R)	34	4	6	24	38	75	−37	18	Relegation to Regional Divisions
18	Vitosha Bistritsa (Note: On December 16 2025 Vitosha Bistritsa declined further participation. Its results still count and its opponents until the end of the season are awarded 3:0 wins.) (R, D)	34	11	5	18	44	62	−18	38	Relegation to Regional Divisions

Updated to match(es) played on 30 May 2026. Source: tretaliga.bg
Rules for classification: 1) Points; 2) Head-to-head points; 3) Head-to-head goal difference; 4) Head-to-head goals scored; 5) Head-to-head away goals scored (only if two teams); 6) Goal difference; 7) Goals scored; 8) Fairplay ranking; 9) Draw.
(C) Champions; (D) Disqualified; (P) Promoted; (R) Relegated

=== Results ===
Home \ Away	BAL	BAN	BOT	CSS	GER	KOS	KYU	LEV	PIR	PIZ	RIL	OBO	SEP	SES	SLA	SLI	STR	VIT
Balkan Botevgrad	—	3–3	2–0	1–4	1–1	2–2	3–1	4–1	4–0	1–1	1–2	2–1	2–1	1–0	2–0	1–2	1–2	3–0
Bansko	0–2	—	0–0	3–0	3–1	2–1	2–3	0–0	3–2	0–0	2–2	2–1	1–1	2–0	1–1	2–1	1–2	0–5
Botev Ihtiman	3–3	1–2	—	1–1	1–2	1–0	3–1	2–0	3–0	5–1	1–1	1–1	3–0	1–0	0–0	1–1	1–2	3–0
CSKA Sofia III	0–1	1–0	1–2	—	5–0	1–0	2–3	1–0	0–2	3–1	1–0	4–1	2–1	1–1	0–2	2–1	1–1	2–1
Germanea	1–4	1–1	4–3	0–1	—	0–2	1–2	3–0	3–4	0–2	0–2	0–1	0–2	0–1	2–3	1–2	2–3	3–0
Kostinbrod	1–0	2–1	1–0	3–2	2–0	—	2–1	2–1	5–3	2–0	1–2	0–0	2–2	2–3	1–3	1–1	1–2	3–0
Kyustendil	0–0	2–0	0–2	5–3	0–0	0–2	—	3–1	2–1	1–0	1–2	2–1	0–0	1–0	4–3	0–0	3–0	3–0
Levski Sofia II	1–1	0–0	1–0	2–1	3–1	2–0	2–1	—	3–1	0–1	1–2	2–1	0–2	1–1	1–5	1–0	1–1	3–0
Pirin Gotse Delchev	0–0	0–0	1–0	2–1	2–2	1–1	2–1	1–0	—	4–2	1–2	2–1	0–1	3–1	1–2	1–0	2–1	0–5
Pirin Razlog	0–1	0–1	2–0	0–2	2–1	2–1	1–2	2–0	4–3	—	1–1	1–1	3–1	6–0	2–2	1–3	2–1	0–0
Rilski Sportist	1–0	2–1	1–2	2–1	2–1	1–0	1–0	2–0	3–0	1–1	—	1–0	5–0	1–3	2–1	2–1	4–1	0–0
Oborishte	1–0	0–1	0–2	0–0	5–1	2–1	1–0	1–0	2–1	3–1	0–1	—	2–0	2–1	2–1	3–0	0–1	1–1
Septemvri Sofia II	3–2	3–2	4–1	0–0	4–2	4–0	0–0	0–1	2–0	3–0	0–0	2–0	—	0–0	5–1	0–0	2–2	0–1
Septemvri Simitli	0–0	0–0	0–2	2–0	4–0	4–1	2–0	0–0	1–0	0–1	1–2	0–0	1–0	—	2–0	2–1	3–2	1–2
Slavia Sofia II	2–1	0–1	2–2	1–2	1–1	2–0	8–1	2–0	4–1	0–1	0–1	1–1	3–2	3–1	—	4–0	1–0	2–1
Slivnishki Geroy	1–1	4–0	3–3	1–0	1–0	0–2	2–4	0–0	3–0	1–0	0–2	3–2	3–1	0–0	0–3	—	2–2	3–0
Strumska Slava	5–0	2–1	2–1	3–1	5–2	1–2	3–1	0–1	5–0	2–0	1–0	1–2	4–1	3–2	3–2	3–0	—	2–2
Vitosha Bistritsa	5–0	2–1	1–2	0–3	1–1	5–1	2–1	3–1	3–2	0–3	0–3	0–3	0–3	0–3	0–3	4–0	0–3	—

Updated to match(es) played on 30 May 2026. Source: Bulgarian Football
Legend: Blue = home team win; Yellow = draw; Red = away team win.
For upcoming matches, an "a" indicates there is an article about the rivalry between the two participants.
