= 2023–24 Third Amateur Football League (Bulgaria) =

Third Amateur Football League
- Season: 2023–24

The 2023–24 Third Amateur Football League season is the 74th of the Bulgarian Third Amateur League. The group is equivalent to the third level of the Bulgarian football pyramid, comprising four divisions based on geographical areas. These divisions are the North-West, North-East, South-East, and South-West. The number of teams in each division varies, similarly to previous seasons.

== Team changes ==
To Third League

Promoted from Regional Leagues

- Fratria
- Benkovski Isperih
- Kubrat
- Dunav Lom
- Hebar Pazardzhik II
- FC Sekirovo

Relegated from Second League

- Minyor Pernik
- Vitosha Bistritsa
- Sozopol
- Botev Plovdiv II

From Third League

Promoted to Second League

- Chernomorets Balchik
- Chernomorets Burgas
- Bdin Vidin
- Marek Dupnitsa

Relegated to Regional Leagues

- Botev Novi Pazar
- Sportist General Toshevo
- Volov Shumen
- Borislav Parvomay
- Vereya
- Lokomotiv Dryanovo
- Levski-Rakovski
- Nadezhda Dobroslavtsi
- Pirin Gotse Delchev
- Granit Vladaya

== North-East Group ==
North-East Third League
- Season: 2022–24

=== Stadia and Locations ===
Locations of teams in the 2023−24 North-East Third League

Team	City	Stadium	Capacity
Benkovski	Isperih	Gradski Stadium	2,000
Chernolomets	Popovo	Stamo Kostov Stadium	5,000
Cherno More II	Varna	Cherno More Sports Complex	1,500
Dorostol	Silistra	Louis Eyer Stadium	12,000
Dunav II	Ruse	Gradski Stadion	13,000
Fratria	Benkovski, Varna Province	Albena 1 Stadium, Albena	3,000
Kubrat	Kubrat	Kubrat Stadium	6,000
Lokomotiv	Ruse	Lokomotiv Stadium	13,000
Ludogorets III	Razgrad	Eagles' Nest	2,000
Riltsi	Dobrich	Druzhba	12,500
Septemvri	Tervel	Septemvri	700
Spartak II	Varna	Lokomotiv	2,000
Svetkavitsa	Targovishte	Dimitar Burkov	5,000
Ustrem	Donchevo	Donchevo Stadium	1,000

=== League table ===
Pos	Team	Pld	W	D	L	GF	GA	GD	Pts	Promotion or relegation
1	Ludogorets III	26	19	4	3	69	16	+53	61	Ineligible for promotion
2	Fratria	25	18	4	3	67	20	+47	58	Promotion to Second League
3	Septemvri Tervel	25	17	4	4	49	19	+30	55	
4	Cherno More II	25	15	8	2	47	17	+30	53	Ineligible for promotion
5	Chernolomets Popovo	25	16	2	7	49	30	+19	50	
6	Spartak Varna II	25	15	2	8	63	27	+36	47	Ineligible for promotion
7	Benkovski Isperih	25	11	2	12	48	42	+6	35	
8	Dorostol Silistra	26	10	4	12	36	50	−14	34	
9	Riltsi Dobrich	25	9	6	10	39	40	−1	33	
10	Ustrem Donchevo	25	7	4	14	36	54	−18	25	
11	Svetkavitsa Targovishte	25	4	7	14	26	52	−26	19	
12	Dunav Ruse II	25	4	4	17	26	61	−35	16	Ineligible for promotion
13	Lokomotiv Ruse	25	2	5	18	21	71	−50	11	Possible Relegation to Regional Divisions
14	Kubrat	25	1	0	24	8	85	−77	3	Possible Relegation to Regional Divisions
15	Sportist General Toshevo (D, R)	0	0	0	0	0	0	0	0	Disqualified
16	Volov Shumen (D, R)	0	0	0	0	0	0	0	0	Disqualified

Updated to match(es) played on 26 May, 2024. Source: bulgarian-football.com
Rules for classification: 1) Points; 2) Head-to-head points; 3) Head-to-head goal difference; 4) Head-to-head goals scored; 5) Head-to-head away goals scored (only if two teams); 6) Goal difference; 7) Goals scored; 8) Fairplay ranking; 9) Draw.
(D) Disqualified; (R) Relegated

=== Season statistics ===
==== Top scorers ====
As of 12 April 2024

Rank	Player	Club	Goals
1	(Bulgaria) Hakan Shyukryu	Benkovski Isperih	17
2	(Bulgaria) Petar Kirev	Ludogorets III	15
3	(Bulgaria) Daniel Halachev	Spartak Varna II	13
4	(Bulgaria) Rumen Nikolov	Septemvri Tervel	10
4	(Bulgaria) Denis Kadir	Fratria	10
4	(Bulgaria) Doni Donchev	Ustrem Donchevo	10
7	(Ukraine) Denys Vasin	Fratria	9
7	(Bulgaria) Antonio Popov	Ludogorets III	9
9	(Bulgaria) Tihomir Kanev	Chernolomets Popovo	8
9	(Moldova) Vasil Andoni	Fratria	8

== South-East Group ==
South-East Third League
- Season: 2023-24

=== Stadia and Locations ===
Location of teams in 2023–24 South-East Third League

Team	City	Stadium	Capacity
Asenovets	Asenovgrad	Shipka Stadium	4,000
Atletik	Kuklen	Atletik	1,000
Beroe II	Stara Zagora	Lokomotiv Stadium	10,000
Botev II	Plovdiv	Futbolen kompleks Botev 1912	3,500
Dimitrovgrad	Dimitrovgrad	Minyor	10,000
Gigant	Saedinenie	Saedinenie	5,000
Karnobat	Karnobat	Gradski	3,000
Levski	Karlovo	Vasil Levski	3,000
Lokomotiv Plovdiv II	Plovdiv	Sadovo Stadium	500
Nesebar	Nesebar	Stadion Nesebar	6,800
Rodopa	Smolyan	Septemvri Stadium	6,100
Rozova Dolina	Kazanlak	Sevtopolis	15,000
Sayana	Haskovo	Haskovo	9,000
Sekirovo	Rakovski	Petar Parchevich Stadium	1,500
Sozopol	Sozopol	Arena Sozopol	3,500
Sliven	Sliven	Hadzhi Dimitar Stadium	10,000
Sokol	Markovo	Sokol	2,500
Spartak Plovdiv	Plovdiv	Sports Complex Eurocollege	500
FC Yambol	Yambol	Tundzha	18,000
Zagorets	Nova Zagora	Zagorets	5,900

== North-West Group ==
North-West Third League
- Season: 2023-24

=== Stadia and locations ===
Location of teams in 2022–23 North-West Third League

Team	City	Stadium	Capacity
Akademik	Svishtov	Akademik	13,500
Botev II	Vratsa	Hristo Botev	25,000
Boruna	Tsareva Livada	Republikanets	815
FC Drenovets	Drenovets	Arena Drenovets	1300
Dunav	Lom	Dunavski Yunak Stadium	2,500
Etar II	Veliko Tarnovo	Trifon Ivanov	
Juventus	Malchika	Georgi Karchev	1,000
Levski 2007	Levski	Levski	6,000
Lokomotiv	Gorna Oryahovitsa	Lokomotiv	10,500
Lokomotiv	Mezdra	Lokomotiv	5,000
Partizan	Cherven Bryag	Gradski	700
Pavlikeni	Pavlikeni	Gancho Panov	10,000
Sevlievo	Sevlievo	Rakovski	5,000
Vihar	Slavyanovo	Gradski	1,000
Yantra Polski Trambesh	Polski Trambesh	Gradski	800

== South-West Group ==
South-West Third League
- Season: 2023-24

=== Stadia and locations ===
Location of teams in 2023–24 South-West Third League
Sofia 2022–23 South-West Third League football clubs

Team	City	Stadium	Capacity
Balkan	Botevgrad	Hristo Botev	8,000
Bansko	Bansko	Saint Peter	3,000
Botev	Ihtiman	Hristo Botev	5,000
Chavdar	Etropole	Chavdar	5,600
CSKA Sofia II	Sofia	Pancharevo	1,500
CSKA 1948 III	Sofia	National Sports Academy	200
Kostinbrod 2012	Kostinbrod	Georgi Benkovski	500
Kyustendil	Kyustendil	Osogovo	10,000
Hebar II	Pazardzhik	Georgi Benkovski	13,128
Levski Sofia II	Sofia	Georgi Asparuhov Training Complex	1,000
Oborishte	Panagyurishte	Orcho Voyvoda	3,000
Pirin Razlog	Razlog	Gradski Stadium	50,000
Rilski Sportist	Samokov	Iskar	7,000
Minyor	Pernik	Minyor	8,000
Septemvri Sofia II	Sofia	German	800
Septemvri Simitli	Simitli	Struma	8,000
Slavia Sofia II	Sofia	Aleksandar Shalamanov	25,556
Slivnishki Geroy	Slivnitsa	Slivnishki Geroy	7,000
Vihren	Sandanski	Sandanski	6,000
Vitosha	Bistritsa	Bistritsa	2,500
