= FC National Sofia =

National Sofia
- Full name: Football Club National Sofia
- Founded: 1 June 2003; 23 years ago
- Ground: NSA Stadium, Sofia
- Capacity: 2,500
- Chairman: Blagomir Mutin
- Manager: Stanislav Katrankov
- League: Third League
- 2025–26: A RFG Sofia, 1st (promoted)
- Website: https://www.fcnational.com/
Home colours	Away colours

National Sofia (Bulgarian: Национал София) is a Bulgarian association football club based in Sofia, which competes in the Third League, the third level of Bulgarian football league system. National's home ground is the NSA Stadium which has a capacity of 2,500 spectators.

== History ==
=== 2003-2023: Establishment as academy ===
National was establimished in 2003 as youth academy by Blagomir Mutin, who studied for football coach, but could not find a job, so decided to start his own academy. By 2015, the academy become the largest in Bulgaria. In 2017 the academy started a partnership with Dinamo Zagreb.

=== 2023-present: Joining the regional leagues ===
Having the success of being part of almost every youth league in Bulgaria, National finally decided to start a first team in 2023 and joined B Regional Group - Sofia. The team won the league and got promoted to A RFG Sofia in 2024, starting with 12 consecutive wins. The team begome popular with joining charity initiatives. In August 2024 the team got involved in an accident with Levski Academy, when a fight was started between managers and parrents of both clubs. In 2024 the team was eliminated by Rilski Sportist in the preliminary round for Bulgarian Cup. In September 2024, National's head coach, Rosen Ilkov was signed by Saudi Arabian women's team United Eagles and his place was taken by Stanislav Katrankov. In 2024–25 season they missed the chance to qualify for Third League, but at the start of 2025–26 season they were one of few team to have team in every Elite Youth leagues (U18, U17, U16, U15).

The team won the A Regional in 2026 and qualified for the promotion playoffs. On 11 June 2026 they beat OFC Kostenets and promoted to Third League for first time in their history.

== Honours ==
- A RFG Sofia:
  - Winners (1): 2025–26
- B RFG Sofia:
  - Winners (1): 2023–24

== Shirt and sponsor ==
Period	Kit manufacturer	Shirt partner
2023–2025	(Italy) Sportika	Raider
2025–present	(Germany) Erima	Raider

== Players ==
=== Current squad ===
As of 3 August 2026

Note: Flags indicate national team as defined under FIFA eligibility rules; some limited exceptions apply. Players may hold more than one non-FIFA nationality.

No.	Pos.	Nation	Player
1	GK	BUL	Nikolay Krastev
2	DF	BUL	Borislav Todorov
3	DF	BUL	Nikolay Lyubomirov
4	DF	BUL	Georgi Bolyarov
5	DF	BUL	Deyan Kirilov
6	MF	BUL	Vladislav Petrunov
9	FW	BUL	Georgi Denov
11	FW	BUL	Kristiyan Dimitrov
13	MF	BUL	Mert Salim
15	FW	BUL	Martin Yordanov
16	DF	BUL	Stiliyan Pamukov
17	FW	BUL	Lyubomir Yugov
18	MF	BUL	Ivaylo Tomchev
19	MF	BUL	Deyan Aleksov

No.	Pos.	Nation	Player
20	FW	BUL	Chavdar Tsvetkov
21	DF	BUL	Vasil Aleksov
22	MF	BUL	Antonio Lalkinski
23	GK	BUL	Yordan Dimitrov
27	DF	BUL	Konstantin Stefanov
28	FW	BUL	Viktor Iliev
30	FW	BUL	Rumen Kolev
31	DF	BUL	Aleksandar Stoychev
76	DF	BUL	Stoyan Shalamanov
78	GK	BUL	Borislav Ivanov
—	DF	BUL	Martin Kovachev
—	DF	BUL	Georgi Markov
—	MF	BUL	Halil Dzhevdet
—	FW	BUL	Kristiyan Ivanov

== Personnel ==
=== Managerial history ===
Dates	Name	Honours
2023–2024	(Bulgaria) Rosen Ilkov	
2024–	(Bulgaria) Stanislav Katrankov	

== Seasons ==
=== Past seasons ===
Results of league and cup competitions by season
Season	League											Bulgarian Cup	Other competitions		Top goalscorer	
Season	Division	Level	P	W	D	L	F	A	GD	Pts	Pos	Bulgarian Cup	Other competitions		Top goalscorer	
2023–24	B RFG Sofia	5	26	25	0	1	170	20	+150	75	1st ↑	DNQ				
2024–25	A RFG Sofia	4	30	24	4	2	133	30	+103	76	2nd	DNQ	Cup of AFL	QF	(Bulgaria) Martin Savov	19
2025–26	A RFG Sofia	4	32	26	4	2	126	21	+105	82	1st ↑	DNQ	Cup of AFL	QF		
2026–27	Third League	3														

==== Key ====
- GS = Group stage
- QF = Quarter-finals
- SF = Semi-finals

Champions	Runners-up	Promoted	Relegated
