= FC Fratria II =

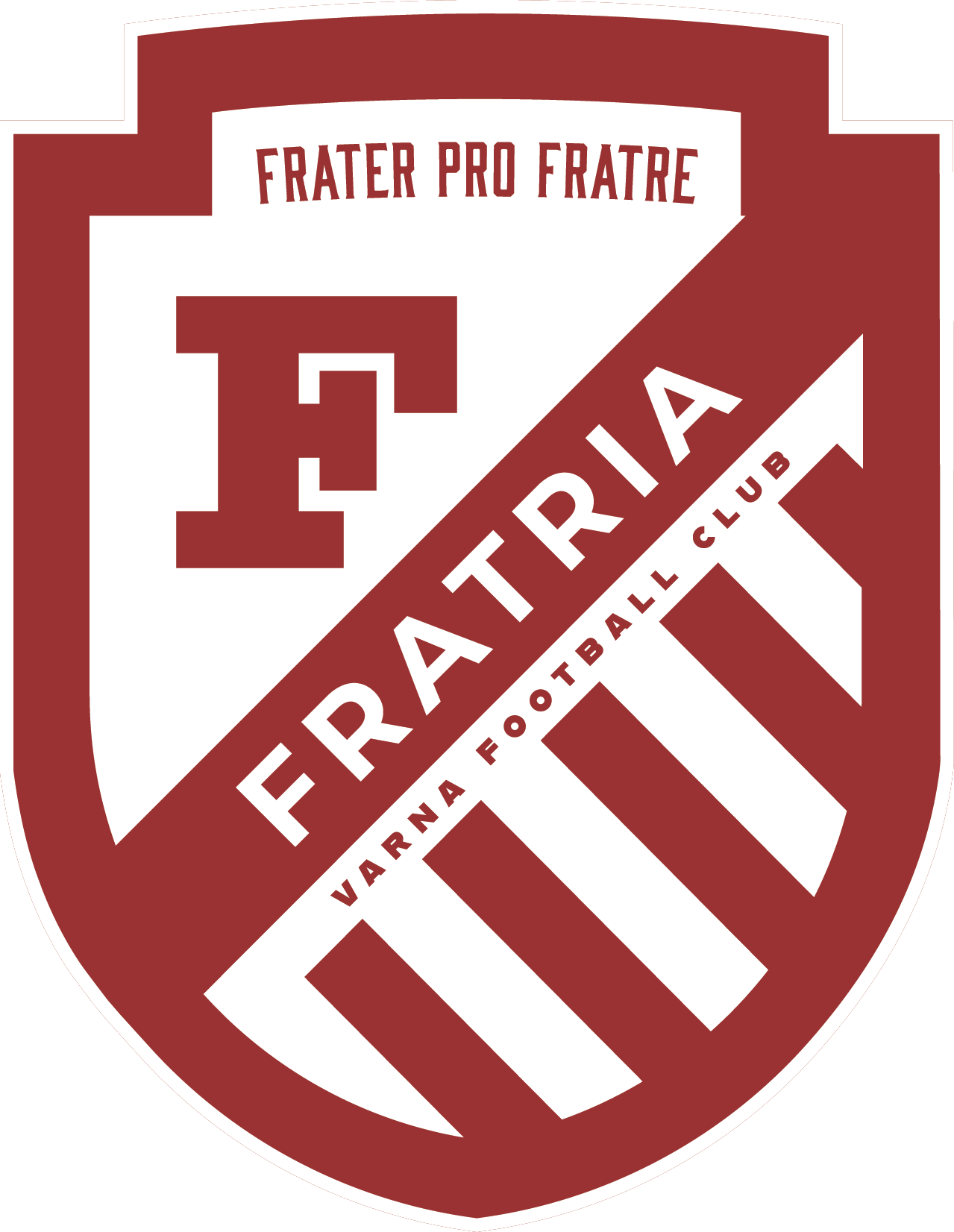
- Full name: Футболен Клуб Фратрия Варна; Fratria Varna Football Club
- Founded: 30 June 2023; 3 years ago
- Ground: Staro Oryahovo Stadium, Staro Oryahovo
- Capacity: 1,000
- Chairman: Viktor Bakurevich
- Manager: Yura Podolchuk
- League: Third League
- 2025–26: 11th
- Website: https://fcfratria.com/
Home colours	Away colours

Fratria II (Bulgarian: Фратрия II) or Fratria 2 is a Bulgarian football team based in Varna. Founded in 2023, it is the reserve team of Fratria, and currently plays in Third League, the third tier of Bulgarian football. Fratria's home ground is the Staro Oryahovo Stadium, which has a capacity of 1,000 spectators.

Obliged to play one level below their main side, Fratria II is ineligible for promotion to Second League and also cannot compete in the Bulgarian Cup.

== History ==
Fratria was established in 2021 by businessman Viktor Bakurevich, owner of Berezka supermarkets. Bakurevich decided to start an academy that is free from taxes, making the club base in Benkovski, Varna Province. The team won the league and on 29 May 2023, Fratria secured promotion to Third League, being called the fastest developing team, because their quick promotion to the third league and the development of their base and academy.

Fratria established a second team that joined a regional league. The team was a leader, together with FC Aksakovo, with Aksakovo winning the league at the end of season and Fratria II finishing second. On 4 June 2024 the team announced they are promoted to Third League.

== Players ==
=== Current squad ===
As of 2 September 2026

Note: Flags indicate national team as defined under FIFA eligibility rules; some limited exceptions apply. Players may hold more than one non-FIFA nationality.

No.	Pos.	Nation	Player
1	GK	BUL	Mark Mitev
3	MF	BUL	Vasil Stoykov
4	DF	BUL	Georgi Ivanov
5	DF	BUL	Teodor Svilenov
6	DF	BUL	Daniel Todorov
7	MF	BUL	Aleksandar Nenov
8	MF	BUL	Nikolay Todorov
9	MF	BUL	Damyan Popov
10	MF	BUL	Viktor Yanchev
13	DF	BUL	Boris Betsinski
14	DF	UKR	Oleksandr Korotkyi
15	MF	BUL	Platon Bakurevich
16	DF	BUL	Martin Hristov
17	FW	BUL	Ivan Pavlov
19	FW	BUL	Ruslan Stoyanov
21	FW	BUL	Presiyan Dimitrov

No.	Pos.	Nation	Player
22	DF	BUL	Filip Penchev
26	DF	BUL	Tsvetomir Dyakov
27	FW	BUL	Teodor Todorov
28	DF	UKR	Oleksandr Filonchuk
31	MF	BUL	David Nikolov
32	MF	BUL	Ivaylo Kolev
33	MF	BUL	Stefan Radev
35	GK	BUL	Nikola Kolev
45	MF	BUL	Levon Varteresyan
70	FW	UKR	Ivan Skoropishnyi
77	FW	BUL	Maksim Petrov
81	FW	UKR	Oleksiy Mazhynskyi
91	DF	BUL	Martin Delev
99	GK	UKR	Vladyslav Ukrainskyi
—	GK	BUL	Viktor Harizanov
—	DF	UKR	Oleksandr Muhanyov

=== Foreign players ===
Up to five non-EU nationals can be registered and given a squad number for the first team in the Bulgarian First Professional League however only three can be used in a match day. Those non-EU nationals with European ancestry can claim citizenship from the nation their ancestors came from. If a player does not have European ancestry he can claim Bulgarian citizenship after playing in Bulgaria for 5 years.

EU Nationals

EU Nationals (Dual citizenship)

- (Russia) (Bulgaria) Мikhail Gashchuk

Non-EU Nationals

- (Ukraine) Vladislav Ukrainskyi

== Personnel ==
=== Managerial history ===
Dates	Name	Honours
2023–2026	(Russia) Evgeniy Gashchuk	
2026	(Ukraine) Denys Vasin (caretaker)	
2026–	(Ukraine) Yura Podolchuk	

== Past seasons ==
Results of league and cup competitions by season
Season	League											Top goalscorer	
Season	Division	Level	P	W	D	L	F	A	GD	Pts	Pos	Top goalscorer	
2023–24	A Regional Varna	4	20	15	2	3	48	7	+41	47	2nd ↑		
2024–25	Third League	3	30	6	3	21	32	88	-56	21	15th	(Bulgaria) Nikola Totev	7
2025–26	Third League	3	32	8	6	18	40	71	-31	30	11th	(Bulgaria) Ivan Pavlov	11
2026–27	Third League	3											
