= 1996–97 B Group =

Season of the Bulgarian B Football Group

Bulgarian B Group
- Season: 1996–97
- Champions: Litex
- Promoted: Litex; Olimpik; Metalurg
- Relegated: Lokomotiv Ruse; Parva Atomna; Spartak Plovdiv; Lokomotiv GO; Chirpan; Hebar
- Matches: 306
- Goals: 776 (2.54 per match)
- Top goalscorer: (Bulgaria) Dimcho Belyakov (23 goals)

The 1996–97 B Group was the 41st season of the Bulgarian B Football Group, the second tier of the Bulgarian football league system. A total of 18 teams contested the league.

Litex Lovech, Olimpik Galata and Metalurg Pernik were promoted to Bulgarian A Group. Lokomotiv Ruse, Parva Atomna Kozloduy, Spartak Plovdiv, Lokomotiv Gorna Oryahovitsa, Chirpan and Hebar Pazardzhik were relegated.

== League table ==
Locations of the 1996–97 Bulgarian B Group teams

Pos	Team	Pld	W	D	L	GF	GA	GD	Pts	Promotion or relegation
1	Litex Lovech (P)	34	26	3	5	74	21	+53	81	Promotion to 1997–98 A Group
2	Olimpik Galata (P)	34	20	5	9	74	44	+30	65	Promotion to 1997–98 A Group
3	Metalurg Pernik (P)	34	20	3	11	55	33	+22	63	Promotion to 1997–98 A Group
4	Pirin Blagoevgrad	34	19	5	10	62	34	+28	62	
5	Haskovo	34	17	3	14	48	50	−2	54	
6	Chardafon Gabrovo	34	17	2	15	40	38	+2	53	
7	Chernomorets Burgas	34	16	4	14	51	39	+12	52	
8	Cherno More Varna	34	15	7	12	39	35	+4	52	
9	Akademik Sofia	34	14	7	13	40	37	+3	49	
10	Avtotreid Aksakovo	34	13	10	11	36	39	−3	49	
11	Shumen	34	14	7	13	45	63	−18	49	
12	Septemvri Sofia	34	13	9	12	37	32	+5	48	
13	Lokomotiv Ruse (R)	34	15	1	18	36	54	−18	46	Relegation to 1997–98 V Group
14	Parva Atomna Kozloduy (R)	34	9	9	16	29	40	−11	36	Relegation to 1997–98 V Group
15	Spartak Plovdiv (R)	34	10	6	18	29	45	−16	36	Relegation to 1997–98 V Group
16	Lokomotiv G. Oryahovitsa (R)	34	10	6	18	31	56	−25	36	Relegation to 1997–98 V Group
17	Chirpan (R)	34	7	3	24	27	60	−33	24	Relegation to 1997–98 V Group
18	Hebar Pazardzhik (R)	34	4	4	26	23	60	−37	16	Relegation to 1997–98 V Group

Source: 1996-97 B Group season futbolbg.dir.bg
Rules for classification: 1) points; 2) goal difference; 3) number of goals scored.
(P) Promoted; (R) Relegated

== Top scorers ==
Rank	Scorer	Club	Goals
1	(Bulgaria) Dimcho Belyakov	Litex Lovech	23
