= FC Aksakovo =

- Full name: Футболен Клуб Аксаково; Football Club Aksakovo
- Founded: 1948; 78 years ago
- Ground: Aksakovo Stadium, Aksakovo
- Capacity: 320
- Chairman: Svetlin Stanchev
- Manager: Ivan Raychev
- League: Third League
- 2024–25: 8th
- Website: https://fcaksakovo.com/
Home colours	Away colours

FC Aksakovo (Bulgarian: ФК Аксаково) is a Bulgarian association football club based in Aksakovo, Bulgaria, which competes in the Third League, the third division of the Bulgarian football league system. Aksakovo's home ground is the Aksakovo Stadium, which has a capacity of 320 spectators.

== History ==
Aksakovo have a football club since 1948 playing mainly in the regional leagues. In 1994, the team was bought by Vahan Angutyan, changing the name of the club from Primorets Aksakovo to Avtotrade Aksakovo, taking the name of his business. The team promoted to Bulgarian B Football Group in 1996 and finished 10th in 1996–97 B Group season, leaded by the ex Bulgaria international Kevork Tahmisyan. Before the start of the season, the team was merged with FC Port Varna into Avtotrade-Port Varna.

In November 2022, the team stadium was rebuilt into a modern mini training complex. In 2023, Kaloyan Mihalev and Nikolay Georgiev become managers of the team, coming together with some players from Septemvri Tervel. In 2024 mid season, the team had same points with FC Fratria II and expressed desire to return to Third League. On 24 April 2024 they secured their first place in the league. On 5 June 2024 it was officially announced that Aksakovo joined Third league.

== Honours ==
- North-East V Group:
  - Winners (1): 1995–96
- A Regional Varna:
  - Winners (1): 2023–24

== Logo, shirt and sponsor ==
Period	Kit manufacturer	Shirt partner
2022–2024	(Bulgaria) Misho Sport	Plastchim-T
2024–	(Germany) Jako	Plastchim-T

== Players ==
=== Current squad ===
As of 12 August 2024

Note: Flags indicate national team as defined under FIFA eligibility rules; some limited exceptions apply. Players may hold more than one non-FIFA nationality.

No.	Pos.	Nation	Player
1	GK	BUL	Atanas Batsov
3	DF	BUL	Slavi Stalev
4	DF	BUL	Angel Rupenyan
5	DF	BUL	Valentin Georgiev
6	MF	BUL	Yordan Atanasov
7	MF	BUL	Dimitar Dimitrov
8	MF	BUL	Ivan Markov
9	FW	BUL	Lyubomir Mihalev
10	MF	BUL	Dimitar Simeonov
11	MF	BUL	Nikolay Iliev
12	GK	BUL	Daniel Dobrev
13	DF	BUL	Mihail Paskalev

No.	Pos.	Nation	Player
14	DF	BUL	Svetoslav Nikolov
15	DF	BUL	Georgi Radev
16	DF	BUL	Dimitar Vasilev
17	FW	BUL	Damyan Petrov
18	MF	BUL	Petko Tsankov
19	MF	BUL	Martin Stelyanov
20	DF	BUL	Kaloyan Tsvetkov
21	FW	BUL	Desislav Dyakov
22	DF	SYR	Akel Al-Ftajeh
23	MF	BUL	Preslav Pasev
24	MF	BUL	Kostadin Ivanov
25	FW	UKR	Bogdan Hristov (on loan from Fratria)

=== Out on loan ===
Note: Flags indicate national team as defined under FIFA eligibility rules; some limited exceptions apply. Players may hold more than one non-FIFA nationality.

No.	Pos.	Nation	Player

== Personnel ==
=== Club officials ===
Position	Name	Nationality
Coaching staff
Head coach	Kaloyan Mihalev	(Bulgaria)
Assistant coach	Nikolay Georgiev	(Bulgaria)
Assistant coach	Ilia Iliev	(Bulgaria)
Goalkeepers coach	Plamen Roev	(Bulgaria)

== Seasons ==
=== Past seasons ===
Results of league and cup competitions by season
Season	League											Bulgarian Cup	Other competitions		Top goalscorer	
Season	Division	Level	P	W	D	L	F	A	GD	Pts	Pos	Bulgarian Cup	Other competitions		Top goalscorer	
1994–95	North-East V Group	3					54	26	+28	48	6th	DNQ				
1995–96	North-East V Group	3	29	23	4	2	69	14	+55	73	1st	DNQ			(Bulgaria) Zhivko Kelepov	21
1996–97	B Group	2	34	13	10	11	36	39	-3	49	10th	Preliminary			(Bulgaria) Zhivko Kelepov	10
1997–98	B Group	2	30	3	5	22	18	73	-55	14	14th	Second Round				
1998–04	Did not participate in league from 1998 to 2004															
2004–05	North-East V Group	3							+		7th	First round				
2005–06	North-East V Group	3	30	15	8	7	56	23	+33	53	5th	DNQ				
2006–07	North-East V Group	3	32	14	8	10	43	34	+9	50	7th	DNQ				
2007–08	North-East V Group	3	34	18	7	9	50	32	+18	61	4th	DNQ				
2008–09	North-East V Group	3	36	18	4	14	62	55	+7	58	7th	DNQ				
2009–10	North-East V Group	3	34	11	0	23	35	86	-51	33	17th	DNQ				
2010–14	Did not participate in league from 2010 to 2014															
2014–15	A Regional Varna	4	20	1	2	17	11	52	-41	5	11th	DNQ				
2015–16	A Regional Varna	4	22	7	5	10	32	44	-12	26	7th	DNQ				
2016–17	A Regional Varna	4	18	4	6	8	14	27	-13	18	7th	DNQ				
2017–18	A Regional Varna	4	24	11	7	6	43	33	+10	40	4th	DNQ				
2018–19	A Regional Varna	4	22	6	8	8	19	35	-16	26	7th	DNQ				
2019–20	A Regional Varna	4	11	2	4	6	13	20	-7	10	9th	DNQ				
2020–21	A Regional Varna	4	24	7	8	9	32	33	-1	29	9th	DNQ				
2021–22	A Regional Varna	4	20	8	4	8	32	27	+5	28	6th	DNQ				
2022–23	A Regional Varna	4	18	9	4	5	28	24	+4	31	4th	DNQ				
2023–24	A Regional Varna	4	20	17	2	1	69	15	+54	53	1st ↑	DNQ				
2024–25	Third League	3	30	12	6	12	50	48	+2	42	8th	Preliminary round	Cup of AFL	QF	(Bulgaria) Rumen Nikolov	10
2025–26	Third League	3										TBD	Cup of AFL	TBD		

==== Key ====
- GS = Group stage
- QF = Quarter-finals
- SF = Semi-finals

Champions	Runners-up	Promoted	Relegated
