= 1997–98 B Group =

Season of the Bulgarian B Football Group

Bulgarian B Group
- Season: 1997–98
- Champions: Septemvri
- Promoted: Septemvri; Pirin; Shumen
- Relegated: Montana; Port-Avtotreid; Storgozia; Dunav-Rakovski
- Matches: 240
- Goals: 630 (2.63 per match)

The 1997–98 B Group was the 42nd season of the Bulgarian B Football Group, the second tier of the Bulgarian football league system. A total of 16 teams contested the league.

Septemvri Sofia, Pirin Blagoevgrad and Shumen were promoted to Bulgarian A Group. Montana, Port-Avtotreid Varna, Storgosia Pleven and Dunav-Rakovski Ruse were relegated.

== League table ==
| Pos | Team | Pld | W | D | L | GF | GA | GD | Pts | Promotion or relegation |
|---|---|---|---|---|---|---|---|---|---|---|
| 1 | Septemvri Sofia (P) | 30 | 19 | 5 | 6 | 54 | 20 | +34 | 62 | Promotion to 1998–99 A Group |
| 2 | Pirin Blagoevgrad (P) | 30 | 18 | 7 | 5 | 55 | 24 | +31 | 61 | Promotion to 1998–99 A Group |
| 3 | Shumen (P) | 30 | 19 | 2 | 9 | 48 | 28 | +20 | 59 | Promotion to 1998–99 A Group |
| 4 | Chernomorets Burgas | 30 | 18 | 5 | 7 | 50 | 17 | +33 | 59 | |
| 5 | Maritsa Plovdiv | 30 | 17 | 2 | 11 | 58 | 28 | +30 | 53 | |
| 6 | Haskovo | 30 | 16 | 3 | 11 | 53 | 34 | +19 | 51 | |
| 7 | Chardafon Gabrovo | 30 | 15 | 4 | 11 | 30 | 24 | +6 | 49 | |
| 8 | Akademik Sofia | 30 | 14 | 6 | 10 | 39 | 28 | +11 | 48 | |
| 9 | Svetkavitsa Targovishte | 30 | 14 | 5 | 11 | 46 | 36 | +10 | 47 | |
| 10 | Cherno More Varna | 30 | 13 | 5 | 12 | 37 | 37 | 0 | 44 | |
| 11 | Kremikovtsi | 30 | 13 | 4 | 13 | 45 | 38 | +7 | 43 | |
| 12 | Dimitrovgrad | 30 | 12 | 3 | 15 | 37 | 54 | −17 | 39 | |
| 13 | Montana (R) | 30 | 9 | 5 | 16 | 28 | 42 | −14 | 32 | Relegation to 1998–99 V Group |
| 14 | Port-Avtotreid Varna (R) | 30 | 3 | 5 | 22 | 18 | 73 | −55 | 14 | Relegation to 1998–99 V Group |
| 15 | Storgozia Pleven (Note: Storgosia Pleven were docked six points.) (R) | 30 | 4 | 5 | 21 | 19 | 68 | −49 | 11 | Relegation to 1998–99 V Group |
| 16 | Dunav-Rakovski Ruse (R) | 30 | 2 | 2 | 26 | 13 | 79 | −66 | 8 | Relegation to 1998–99 V Group |

Source: rsssf.com
Rules for classification: 1) points; 2) goal difference; 3) number of goals scored.
(P) Promoted; (R) Relegated
