= Valchan Chanev =

Bulgarian footballer

Personal information
- Full name: Valchan Petev Chanev
- Date of birth: 15 July 1992 (age 34)
- Place of birth: Haskovo, Bulgaria
- Height: 1.86 m (6 ft 1 in)
- Position: Midfielder

Team information
- Current team: Sayana Haskovo
- Number: 10

Senior career*
Years	Team	Apps	(Gls)
2010–2012	Sliven 2000	11	(0)
2012–2015	Haskovo	71	(1)
2015	Neftochimic Burgas	10	(0)
2016–2017	Botev Galabovo	39	(0)
2017–2019	Arda Kardzhali	48	(9)
2019	Botev Galabovo	15	(1)
2020	Lokomotiv GO	4	(0)
2020	Neftochimic	14	(0)
2021	Haskovo		
2021–	Sayana Haskovo		
- * Club domestic league appearances and goals as of 20:21, 6 March 2021 (UTC)

Valchan Chanev (Bulgarian: Вълчан Чанев; born 15 July 1992) is a Bulgarian footballer who plays as a midfielder for FC Sayana Haskovo.

== Career ==
In June 2017, Chanev was released by Botev Galabovo and joined Third League club Arda Kardzhali.
