= FC Kyustendil =

Kyustendil
- Full name: Football Club Kyustendil
- Founded: 1 June 2010; 16 years ago
- Ground: Osogovo Stadium, Kyustendil
- Capacity: 10,000
- Chairman: Svetoslav Grigorov
- Manager: Daniel Mladenov
- League: South-West Third League
- 2025–26: South-West Third League, 5th of 18
- Website: fc-kyustendil.com
Home colours	Away colours

Kyustendil (Bulgarian: Кюстендил) is a Bulgarian association football club based in Kyustendil, which competes in the Third League, the third division of the Bulgarian football league system. Kyustendil's home ground is the Osogovo Stadium which has a capacity of 10,000 spectators.

== History ==
FC Kyustendil was establimished in 2010.

In the summer of 2024, the team announced Daniel Mladenov as a playing coach and also a merge between the team and Velbazhd Kyustendil, but with Velbazhd becoming a second team.

== Players ==
=== Current squad ===
As of 22 October 2026

Note: Flags indicate national team as defined under FIFA eligibility rules; some limited exceptions apply. Players may hold more than one non-FIFA nationality.

No.	Pos.	Nation	Player
1	GK	BUL	Vladislav Nikolov
5	DF	BUL	Adrian Vidinov
6	DF	BUL	Borislav Papanski
7	MF	BUL	Radoslav Aleksandrov
8	MF	BUL	Dani Batsanov
9	FW	BUL	Aleksandar Aleksandrov
10	MF	BUL	Lyuboslav Lyubomirov
11	MF	BUL	Mario Evtimov
12	GK	BUL	Ivan Topalov
14	DF	BUL	Mario Ivanov

No.	Pos.	Nation	Player
15	DF	BUL	Kristiyan Yakimov
16	DF	BUL	Vladi Manov
17	MF	BUL	Kristian Daskalov
19	DF	BUL	Viktor Stoykov
21	MF	BUL	Mario Evtimov
22	DF	BUL	Adriyan Bachovski
23	DF	BUL	Emil Kostov
71	MF	BUL	Dimitar Iliev
88	MF	BUL	Radoslav Aleksandrov
99	FW	BUL	Mihail Yordanov

== Notable players ==
Had international caps for their respective countries, held any club record, or had more than 100 league appearances. Players whose name is listed in bold represented their countries.

Bulgaria

- (Bulgaria) **Daniel Mladenov**
- (Bulgaria) **Andrey Yordanov**

== Seasons ==
=== Past seasons ===
Results of league and cup competitions by season
Season	League											Bulgarian Cup	Other competitions	Top goalscorer	
Season	Division	Level	P	W	D	L	F	A	GD	Pts	Pos	Bulgarian Cup	Other competitions	Top goalscorer	
2019–20	Third League	3	18	10	2	6	27	17	+10	32	4th	DNQ		(Bulgaria) Aleksandar Aleksandrov	11
2020–21	Third League	3	34	26	4	4	63	14	+49	79	2nd	DNQ		(Bulgaria) Aleksandar Aleksandrov	20
2021–22	Third League	3	38	24	8	6	75	26	+49	80	4th	DNQ		(Bulgaria) Aleksandar Aleksandrov	30
2022–23	Third League	3	38	20	12	6	64	31	+33	72	3rd	DNQ		(Bulgaria) Mario Evtimov	15
2023–24	Third League	3	38	12	10	16	53	54	-1	46	13th	Preliminary round		(Bulgaria) Mario Evtimov	14
2024–25	Third League	3													

==== Key ====
- GS = Group stage
- QF = Quarter-finals
- SF = Semi-finals

Champions	Runners-up	Promoted	Relegated
