= Marchev =

Marchev (masculine, Bulgarian: Марчев) or Marcheva (feminine, Bulgarian: Марчева) is a Bulgarian surname. Notable people with the surname include:

- Iliyan Marchev (born 1992), Bulgarian footballer
- Veselin Marchev (born 1990), Bulgarian footballer
