= 2024–25 Third Amateur Football League (Bulgaria) =

Third Amateur Football League
- Season: 2024–25
- Promoted: Chernomorets 1919 Burgas; Sevlievo; Vihren Sandanski
- Relegated: Botev Plovdiv III; CSKA 1948 III; Granit; Karnobat; Kubrat; Lokomotiv Dryanovo; Pirin Blagoevgrad II

The 2024–25 Third Amateur Football League season is the 75th of the Bulgarian Third Amateur League. The group is equivalent to the third level of the Bulgarian football pyramid, comprising four divisions based on geographical areas. These divisions are the North-West, North-East, South-East, and South-West. The number of teams in each division varies, similarly to previous seasons.

At the end of the season, only three teams were promoted as no team from the Southeast League obtained a license for professional football.

== Team changes ==
To Third League

Promoted from Regional Leagues

- Aksakovo
- Fratria II
- Botev Novi Pazar
- Volov Shumen
- Lokomotiv Dryanovo
- Kom Berkovitsa
- Pirin Gotse Delchev
- Granit
- Svilengrad 2022
- Maritsa Milevo

Relegated from Second League

- Bdin Vidin
- Chernomorets Balchik
- Chernomorets Burgas
- Maritsa Plovdiv

Newly promoted teams

- CSKA Sofia III
- Pirin Blagoevgrad II
- Botev Plovdiv III

From Third League

Promoted to Second League

- Lokomotiv Gorna Oryahovitsa
- Minyor Pernik
- Fratria Varna
- Nesebar
- CSKA Sofia II
- Botev Plovdiv II

Relegated to Regional Leagues

- Dunav II
- Lokomotiv Ruse
- Boruna
- Dunav Lom
- Drenovets
- Botev Vratsa II
- Kostinbrod 2012
- Hebar II
- Sliven
- Sokol Markovo
- Beroe Stara Zagora II

== North-East Group ==
=== Stadia and Locations ===
Location of teams in 2024–25 North-East Third League

Team	City	Stadium	Capacity
Aksakovo	Aksakovo	Aksakovo Stadium	320
Benkovski	Isperih	Gradski Stadium	2,000
Botev	Novi Pazar	Hristo Botev Stadium	8,000
Chernolomets	Popovo	Stamo Kostov Stadium	5,000
Cherno More II	Varna	Cherno More Sports Complex	1,500
Chernomorets	Balchik	Balchik	2,600
Dorostol	Silistra	Louis Eyer Stadium	12,000
Fratria II	Benkovski	Staro Oryahovo Stadium	500
Kubrat	Kubrat	Kubrat Stadium	6,000
Ludogorets III	Razgrad	Eagles' Nest	2,000
Riltsi	Dobrich	Riltsi Stadium	650
Septemvri	Tervel	Septemvri Stadium	700
Spartak II	Varna	Lokomotiv Stadium	2,000
Svetkavitsa	Targovishte	Dimitar Burkov	5,000
Volov	Shumen	Panayot Volov	3,500
Ustrem	Donchevo	Dobrich artificial pitch	1,000

=== League table ===
Pos	Team	Pld	W	D	L	GF	GA	GD	Pts	Promotion or relegation
1	Septemvri Tervel (Note: Septemvri Tervel declined promotion due to financial and organizational reasons;) (C)	30	24	3	3	73	18	+55	75	Promotion to Second League
2	Chernolomets Popovo	30	22	3	5	69	25	+44	69	
3	Volov Shumen	30	21	3	6	66	26	+40	66	
4	Chernomorets Balchik	30	18	7	5	52	16	+36	61	
5	Ludogorets III	30	18	6	6	72	21	+51	60	Ineligible for promotion
6	Cherno More II	30	14	7	9	42	31	+11	49	
7	Spartak Varna II	30	12	9	9	49	29	+20	45	
8	Aksakovo	30	12	6	12	50	48	+2	42	
9	Dorostol Silistra	30	11	7	12	36	36	0	40	
10	Benkovski Isperih	30	11	6	13	55	46	+9	39	
11	Ustrem Donchevo	30	8	7	15	38	68	−30	31	
12	Riltsi Dobrich	30	7	10	13	47	54	−7	31	
13	Svetkavitsa Targovishte	30	6	6	18	31	66	−35	24	
14	Botev Novi Pazar	30	6	4	20	29	68	−39	22	
15	Fratria II	30	6	3	21	32	88	−56	21	Ineligible for promotion
16	Kubrat (Note: On 10 January 2025 Kubrat 2016 (Kubrat) withdraws. Its results are annulled. Its results still count and its opponents until the end of the season are awarded 3:0 wins.) (R, D)	30	0	1	29	11	112	−101	1	Relegation to Regional Divisions

Updated to match(es) played on 3 June 2025. Source: bulgarian-football.com
Rules for classification: 1) Points; 2) Head-to-head points; 3) Head-to-head goal difference; 4) Head-to-head goals scored; 5) Head-to-head away goals scored (only if two teams); 6) Goal difference; 7) Goals scored; 8) Fairplay ranking; 9) Draw.
(C) Champions; (D) Disqualified; (R) Relegated

=== Results ===
Home \ Away	AKS	BEN	BNP	CHE	CHB	CHM	DOR	FRA	KUB	LUD	RIL	SEP	SVE	SVN	VOL	UST
Aksakovo	—	0–1	4–1	1–2	0–3	2–0	0–1	5–2	6–1	1–3	4–3	1–2	2–0	0–0	1–1	3–1
Benkovski Isperih	5–0	—	7–4	0–1	0–2	1–0	0–2	3–4	7–2	1–2	2–1	2–4	3–0	2–0	1–4	0–0
Botev Novi Pazar	0–2	1–1	—	1–2	0–3	2–3	1–1	2–1	4–1	0–0	1–0	1–4	0–2	0–0	1–3	1–0
Chernolomets Popovo	4–1	3–2	5–0	—	1–0	2–1	1–2	6–1	6–1	1–0	3–0	1–1	1–1	1–0	3–4	5–1
Chernomorets Balchik	1–1	0–1	2–0	2–1	—	2–0	2–0	2–2	3–0	1–0	1–1	2–1	1–1	1–0	1–2	3–0
Cherno More II	0–1	1–1	2–0	1–0	0–3	—	1–1	2–0	4–0	2–2	3–1	0–1	3–0	0–0	0–3	1–1
Dorostol Silistra	0–2	3–2	1–0	0–1	0–1	0–0	—	4–1	3–0	0–2	0–0	0–2	3–2	1–1	0–1	0–1
Fratria II	0–3	0–5	3–0	1–4	0–3	0–2	1–3	—	2–1	0–1	4–0	0–5	3–2	0–3	1–8	1–3
Kubrat	0–3	0–3	0–3	0–3	1–4	0–3	0–3	0–3	—	1–6	0–3	1–5	0–2	0–3	0–3	1–1
Ludogorets III	1–1	2–1	3–1	0–1	1–1	0–1	1–0	10–0	3–0	—	3–0	2–0	7–0	3–1	1–3	2–0
Riltsi Dobrich	2–2	0–0	4–0	4–3	0–3	3–4	5–2	1–1	5–1	1–1	—	1–1	5–3	2–2	0–0	3–1
Septemvri Tervel	4–0	2–0	5–0	3–1	1–0	3–1	2–0	3–0	3–0	1–1	1–0	—	6–0	3–2	2–0	1–0
Svetkavitsa Targovishte	2–2	1–1	0–3	0–1	1–1	0–1	0–3	1–0	3–0	0–0	0–0	0–2	—	1–0	1–2	3–1
Spartak Varna II	2–0	2–2	3–0	0–3	0–0	1–1	1–1	3–0	9–0	0–4	1–0	1–0	2–0	—	4–1	5–0
Volov Shumen	3–0	1–0	3–1	0–2	1–0	0–1	4–1	2–0	3–0	1–0	5–2	0–1	3–0	3–0	—	4–0
Ustrem Donchevo	3–2	4–1	3–1	1–1	0–4	1–4	1–1	1–1	3–0	0–7	2–0	1–4	6–4	0–3	2–2	—

Updated to match(es) played on 3 June 2025. Source: Bulgarian Football
Legend: Blue = home team win; Yellow = draw; Red = away team win.
For upcoming matches, an "a" indicates there is an article about the rivalry between the two participants.

== South-East Group ==
=== Stadia and Locations ===
Plovdiv 2024–25 Third League football clubs
Location of teams in 2024–25 South-East Third League

Team	City	Stadium	Capacity
Asenovets	Asenovgrad	Shipka Stadium	4,000
Atletik Kuklen	Kuklen	Atletik Stadium	1,000
Botev Plovdiv III	Plovdiv	Nikola Shterev - Starika Sports Complex	3,000
Chernomorets Burgas	Burgas	Ivan Pritargov Stadium	5,000
Dimitrovgrad	Dimitrovgrad	Minyor Stadium	10,000
Gigant Saedinenie	Saedinenie	Saedinenie Stadium	5,000
Karnobat	Karnobat	Gradski Stadium	3,000
Levski Karlovo	Karlovo	Vasil Levski Stadium	3,000
Lokomotiv Plovdiv II	Plovdiv	Stadion Plovdiv	55,000
Maritsa Milevo	Milevo	Milevo Stadium	0
Maritsa Plovdiv	Plovdiv	Maritsa Stadium	5,000
Rodopa Smolyan	Smolyan	Septemvri Stadium	6,000
Rozova Dolina	Kazanlak	Sevtopolis Stadium	15,000
Sayana	Haskovo	Haskovo Stadium	9,000
Sekirovo	Rakovski	Parchevich Stadium	1,500
Sozopol	Sozopol	Arena Sozopol	3,500
Spartak Plovdiv	Plovdiv	Sport Complex Spartak	0
Svilengrad 2022	Svilengrad	Kolodruma Stadium	1,750
Yambol 1915	Yambol	Tundzha Stadium	18,000
Zagorets	Nova Zagora	Stadion Zagorets	5,900

=== League table ===
Pos	Team	Pld	W	D	L	GF	GA	GD	Pts	Promotion or relegation
1	Chernomorets Burgas (C, P)	38	35	1	2	131	18	+113	106	Promotion to Second League
2	Spartak Plovdiv	38	29	3	6	105	29	+76	90	
3	Yambol 1915	38	24	7	7	66	37	+29	79	
4	Maritsa Plovdiv	38	24	6	8	70	37	+33	78	
5	Zagorets	38	20	6	12	60	37	+23	66	
6	Rozova Dolina	38	18	10	10	54	40	+14	64	
7	Gigant Saedinenie	38	18	7	13	53	39	+14	61	
8	Maritsa Milevo	38	16	11	11	47	47	0	59	
9	Svilengrad 2022	38	15	5	18	73	77	−4	50	
10	Lokomotiv Plovdiv II	38	15	4	19	58	60	−2	49	
11	Sayana	38	14	6	18	42	63	−21	48	
12	Atletik Kuklen	38	13	8	17	48	67	−19	47	
13	Sozopol	38	13	7	18	45	53	−8	46	
14	Sekirovo	38	11	9	18	50	59	−9	42	
15	Rodopa Smolyan	38	11	7	20	53	69	−16	40	
16	Dimitrovgrad	38	11	9	18	47	49	−2	42	
17	Levski Karlovo	38	11	7	20	44	71	−27	40	
18	Asenovets	38	10	7	21	38	95	−57	37	
19	Botev Plovdiv III (R)	38	7	7	24	45	67	−22	28	Relegation to Regional Divisions
20	Karnobat (Note: On 4 February 2025 Karnobat withdraws. Its results are annulled. Its results still count and its opponents until the end of the season are awarded 3:0 wins.) (R, D)	38	1	1	36	13	128	−115	4	Relegation to Regional Divisions

Updated to match(es) played on 1 June 2025. Source: bulgarian-football.com
Rules for classification: 1) Points; 2) Head-to-head points; 3) Head-to-head goal difference; 4) Head-to-head goals scored; 5) Head-to-head away goals scored (only if two teams); 6) Goal difference; 7) Goals scored; 8) Fairplay ranking; 9) Draw.
(C) Champions; (D) Disqualified; (P) Promoted; (R) Relegated

=== Results ===
Home \ Away	ASE	ATL	BOT	CHE	DIM	GIS	KAR	LEV	LPD	MAM	MAR	ROD	ROZ	SAY	SEK	SOZ	SPA	SVI	YAM	ZAG
Asenovets	—	2–2	1–1	0–6	1–0	2–1	3–1	0–0	1–0	3–0	1–2	1–1	1–5	3–1	1–1	1–0	1–4	0–2	0–1	0–0
Atletik Kuklen	3–1	—	2–1	0–0	1–0	1–1	3–0	4–0	2–1	3–3	1–2	2–1	0–0	0–0	4–1	3–1	1–1	2–1	0–1	0–4
Botev Plovdiv III	2–0	6–0	—	0–3	0–2	0–1	0–2	0–2	1–0	1–2	0–1	1–2	1–2	3–1	1–1	3–0	1–2	2–2	0–2	1–1
Chernomorets Burgas	6–0	5–1	7–2	—	4–0	3–0	7–0	5–0	4–0	5–0	4–0	5–0	3–0	5–1	2–1	2–0	2–1	3–0	2–0	3–1
Dimitrovgrad	0–1	4–0	2–0	0–3	—	0–2	5–0	2–0	2–0	1–1	1–2	2–2	4–2	0–1	1–1	2–0	1–4	6–2	1–1	0–0
Gigant Saedinenie	2–0	3–2	2–2	0–2	3–1	—	3–0	3–0	1–2	1–1	2–0	2–0	0–0	3–0	0–1	3–0	1–2	3–2	1–1	1–0
Karnobat	0–3	0–4	0–3	0–3	0–3	1–2	—	1–2	0–3	0–7	0–0	0–3	1–3	0–3	0–4	1–5	0–3	0–3	1–2	0–3
Levski Karlovo	3–0	3–0	0–5	1–6	2–1	1–0	3–0	—	3–0	2–0	0–1	2–2	2–3	1–2	5–2	0–3	0–2	2–3	0–0	0–0
Lokomotiv Plovdiv II	5–1	4–0	1–0	1–5	2–2	2–2	3–1	3–2	—	0–1	2–3	2–3	1–0	5–0	2–1	2–1	1–2	0–2	3–0	0–2
Maritsa Milevo	2–2	2–1	1–1	0–1	2–0	2–1	3–0	2–1	1–1	—	2–0	1–0	0–0	2–1	1–0	2–1	1–3	1–0	2–2	3–1
Maritsa Plovdiv	3–1	2–0	2–0	2–1	2–1	0–3	3–0	4–0	2–0	3–0	—	2–1	0–0	3–3	2–0	1–0	0–2	7–0	4–1	6–1
Rodopa Smolyan	4–1	1–2	2–0	0–2	0–0	0–1	5–1	2–2	1–3	0–0	2–2	—	6–0	3–1	2–0	1–3	0–4	1–2	1–2	2–1
Rozova Dolina	1–0	3–0	2–0	2–1	0–0	2–1	3–0	1–0	3–1	2–0	0–2	2–0	—	1–2	2–0	2–2	1–1	2–0	0–0	1–2
Sayana	5–1	1–0	2–0	0–2	1–1	0–2	3–1	0–2	0–2	0–1	0–0	3–0	1–0	—	3–1	0–2	0–4	0–1	2–1	1–0
Sekirovo	3–1	2–0	2–1	0–2	3–0	4–1	3–0	1–1	1–1	2–0	3–0	2–1	0–3	2–2	—	1–1	1–2	3–3	1–1	0–1
Sozopol	0–2	1–1	1–1	1–3	1–0	1–0	3–0	1–1	3–1	3–0	0–4	2–0	1–2	0–1	2–0	—	0–2	1–1	1–1	1–0
Spartak Plovdiv	5–1	4–0	4–2	0–2	1–0	0–1	9–0	5–0	2–0	0–1	0–1	3–0	1–1	5–0	3–1	2–0	—	5–1	3–0	4–0
Svilengrad 2022	10–0	1–2	3–2	2–5	0–1	1–0	3–2	4–0	1–3	2–0	2–2	3–4	3–1	1–1	4–1	4–1	3–5	—	0–3	0–1
Yambol 1915	5–1	2–1	4–0	1–3	2–0	1–0	3–0	2–1	2–1	2–0	3–0	2–0	2–1	2–0	2–0	3–0	2–5	4–1	—	1–0
Zagorets	8–0	2–0	3–1	1–4	2–1	3–0	4–0	1–0	2–0	1–1	1–0	5–0	1–1	3–0	1–0	0–2	2–0	1–0	1–3	—

Updated to match(es) played on 1 June 2025. Source: Bulgarian Football
Legend: Blue = home team win; Yellow = draw; Red = away team win.
For upcoming matches, an "a" indicates there is an article about the rivalry between the two participants.

== North-West Group ==
=== Stadia and Locations ===
Location of teams in 2024–25 North-West Third League

Team	City	Stadium	Capacity
Akademik Svishtov	Svishtov	Akademik Stadium	13,500
Bdin Vidin	Vidin	Georgi Benkovski	15,000
Etar Veliko Tarnovo II	Veliko Tarnovo	Trifon Ivanov Playground	0
Juventus Malchika	Malchika	Georgi Karchev	1,000
Kom Berkovitsa	Berkovitsa	Mramor Stadium	3,000
Levski	Levski	Levski Stadium	6,000
Lokomotiv Dryanovo	Dryanovo	Levski Stadium	3,500
Lokomotiv Mezdra	Mezdra	Lokomotiv Stadium	3,000
Partizan Cherven Bryag	Cherven Bryag	Gradski Stadium	1,500
Pavlikeni	Pavlikeni	Gancho Panov	10,000
Sevlievo	Sevlievo	Stadion Rakovski	5,000
Vihar Slavyanovo	Slavyanovo	Gradski Stadium	1,000
Yantra Polski Trumbesh	Polski Trumbesh	Gradski Stadium	2,000

=== League table ===
Pos	Team	Pld	W	D	L	GF	GA	GD	Pts	Promotion or relegation
1	Sevlievo (C, P)	24	16	4	4	52	19	+33	52	Promotion to Second League
2	Akademik Svishtov	24	12	8	4	32	13	+19	44	
3	Vihar Slavyanovo	24	11	10	3	24	13	+11	43	
4	Pavlikeni	24	12	4	8	34	43	−9	40	
5	Bdin Vidin	24	10	6	8	41	32	+9	36	
6	Yantra Polski Trumbesh	24	10	6	8	41	37	+4	36	
7	Lokomotiv Mezdra	24	9	8	7	39	25	+14	35	
8	Levski	24	9	6	9	29	31	−2	33	
9	Partizan Cherven Bryag	24	6	6	12	21	34	−13	24	
10	Etar Veliko Tarnovo II	24	8	0	16	28	49	−21	24	
11	Kom Berkovitsa	24	6	5	13	30	32	−2	23	
12	Juventus Malchika	24	6	4	14	26	48	−22	22	
13	Lokomotiv Dryanovo (R)	24	4	7	13	22	43	−21	19	Relegation to Regional Divisions

Updated to match(es) played on 25 May 2025. Source: bulgarian-football.com
Rules for classification: 1) Points; 2) Head-to-head points; 3) Head-to-head goal difference; 4) Head-to-head goals scored; 5) Head-to-head away goals scored (only if two teams); 6) Goal difference; 7) Goals scored; 8) Fairplay ranking; 9) Draw.
(C) Champions; (P) Promoted; (R) Relegated

=== Results ===
Home \ Away	AKA	BDI	ETA	LEV	JUV	KOM	LOK	LOM	PAV	PAR	SEV	VIH	YAN
Akademik Svishtov	—	0–2	1–0	1–0	5–0	3–1	2–0	0–0	3–0	1–0	0–1	0–0	1–0
Bdin Vidin	1–3	—	1–0	2–1	4–1	3–1	5–1	1–2	1–1	0–0	2–1	1–1	4–1
Etar Veliko Tarnovo II	1–0	2–0	—	5–2	2–0	1–0	2–1	2–1	0–0	0–1	1–5	1–2	4–3
Levski	0–3	1–0	2–1	—	3–0	2–1	4–1	1–0	3–0	2–0	2–0	0–0	0–0
Juventus Malchika	2–1	1–3	2–1	1–0	—	1–0	3–2	0–1	1–2	3–4	2–2	1–1	2–0
Kom Berkovitsa	1–2	1–1	3–0	3–0	3–0	—	0–0	1–1	4–1	0–2	0–3	0–1	1–1
Lokomotiv Dryanovo	1–1	1–1	2–0	2–2	2–1	2–3	—	1–1	0–1	1–0	1–1	0–1	1–4
Lokomotiv Mezdra	0–0	1–2	4–1	2–2	5–1	0–4	2–1	—	8–0	3–0	1–2	1–1	1–1
Pavlikeni	0–2	4–3	6–1	3–0	0–0	1–0	0–0	1–1	—	1–0	1–2	1–0	3–2
Partizan Cherven Bryag	1–1	2–2	2–1	0–0	1–0	2–1	0–1	0–3	1–2	—	1–2	0–0	0–2
Sevlievo	0–0	1–0	2–0	3–1	2–1	2–1	3–0	0–1	6–0	4–1	—	0–0	9–1
Vihar Slavyanovo	1–1	1–0	3–0	2–0	3–2	0–0	2–0	1–0	2–1	1–1	0–1	—	0–2
Yantra Polski Trumbesh	1–1	4–1	2–0	1–1	1–1	3–1	4–1	2–0	1–2	3–0	2–0	0–1	—

Updated to match(es) played on 25 May 2025. Source: Bulgarian Football
Legend: Blue = home team win; Yellow = draw; Red = away team win.
For upcoming matches, an "a" indicates there is an article about the rivalry between the two participants.

== South-West Group ==
=== League table ===
Pos	Team	Pld	W	D	L	GF	GA	GD	Pts	Promotion or relegation
1	Vihren Sandanski (C, P)	36	26	5	5	81	34	+47	83	Promotion to Second League
2	Kyustendil	36	24	4	8	98	46	+52	76	
3	Oborishte	36	19	10	7	63	33	+30	67	
4	Rilski Sportist	36	18	8	10	68	51	+17	62	
5	Bansko	36	15	11	10	45	31	+14	56	
6	Balkan Botevgrad	36	15	9	12	60	56	+4	54	
7	Pirin Razlog	36	15	8	13	57	47	+10	53	
8	Septemvri Simitli	36	16	5	15	47	46	+1	53	
9	Vitosha Bistritsa	36	15	7	14	52	51	+1	52	
10	Septemvri Sofia II	36	15	7	14	46	48	−2	52	
11	Levski Sofia II	36	14	6	16	39	43	−4	48	
12	Pirin Gotse Delchev	36	12	11	13	43	57	−14	47	
13	CSKA Sofia III	36	11	13	12	50	51	−1	46	Ineligible for promotion
14	Botev Ihtiman	36	11	12	13	40	47	−7	45	
15	Slivnishki Geroy	36	10	12	14	44	45	−1	42	
16	Slavia Sofia II	36	9	11	16	41	58	−17	38	
17	CSKA 1948 III (R)	36	7	9	20	45	70	−25	30	Relegation to Regional Divisions
18	Pirin Blagoevgrad II (R)	36	5	10	21	32	64	−32	25	Relegation to Regional Divisions
19	Granit (R)	36	2	8	26	34	107	−73	14	Relegation to Regional Divisions

Updated to match(es) played on 7 June 2025. Source: bulgarian-football.com
Rules for classification: 1) Points; 2) Head-to-head points; 3) Head-to-head goal difference; 4) Head-to-head goals scored; 5) Head-to-head away goals scored (only if two teams); 6) Goal difference; 7) Goals scored; 8) Fairplay ranking; 9) Draw.
(C) Champions; (P) Promoted; (R) Relegated

=== Results ===
Home \ Away	BAL	BAN	BOT	CSK	CSS	GRA	KYU	LEV	PIB	PIR	PIZ	RIL	OBO	SEP	SES	SLA	SLI	VIH	VIT
Balkan Botevgrad	—	2–0	0–1	4–3	1–0	9–2	2–0	4–1	2–0	1–1	2–0	2–1	1–3	1–0	2–1	1–1	2–1	2–4	1–1
Bansko	1–1	—	1–1	3–3	2–0	4–0	0–0	2–0	0–0	1–2	0–2	2–1	0–1	4–1	3–0	2–0	3–0	1–3	1–0
Botev Ihtiman	2–2	0–0	—	4–1	0–0	3–1	1–2	1–0	2–4	1–1	1–1	0–1	0–3	0–1	2–2	0–0	2–0	0–1	3–1
CSKA 1948 III	4–0	0–1	2–1	—	1–1	1–0	1–2	2–4	1–1	2–2	0–1	2–0	0–0	0–2	2–1	0–3	2–1	2–5	2–2
CSKA Sofia III	3–2	0–1	1–1	3–1	—	1–0	2–4	3–0	2–2	1–1	2–1	2–3	5–3	0–0	2–2	0–1	1–1	1–1	4–1
Granit	0–1	0–4	2–3	1–1	1–2	—	0–3	1–4	0–0	2–2	0–1	2–2	1–1	1–1	1–2	2–1	3–3	1–4	1–1
Kyustendil	5–1	3–2	4–1	5–2	5–1	7–1	—	3–0	5–0	4–1	6–0	4–3	2–1	1–1	1–1	5–1	0–2	0–2	2–0
Levski Sofia II	2–2	0–0	2–0	1–0	0–2	2–3	1–0	—	2–0	4–1	0–1	3–1	0–1	0–2	1–0	1–2	1–0	2–1	1–0
Pirin Blagoevgrad II	1–0	1–1	2–3	1–1	2–3	3–2	0–3	0–2	—	0–2	1–1	1–2	0–1	2–3	2–0	1–1	0–1	1–2	1–2
Pirin Gotse Delchev	0–2	2–1	0–0	0–3	3–2	2–0	3–2	0–2	0–0	—	1–0	2–1	1–3	1–0	2–1	1–0	1–1	1–3	1–1
Pirin Razlog	4–0	1–1	1–1	2–1	2–1	6–1	2–3	2–0	2–0	2–0	—	2–2	2–5	3–0	3–1	0–0	2–2	0–0	1–2
Rilski Sportist	1–1	1–0	2–0	5–1	0–0	7–1	3–3	4–1	2–0	2–2		—	3–2	2–1	0–1	3–2	1–0	2–0	0–4
Oborishte	0–0	0–0	0–0	4–2	1–0	4–0	2–1	0–0	5–0	2–0	2–0	1–1	—	1–0	0–0	3–0	4–1	0–2	0–0
Septemvri Sofia II	2–1	0–1	0–1	5–1	0–1	5–1	1–2	0–0	1–0	3–2	0–5	2–1	3–2	—	0–2	1–1	1–0	2–1	3–2
Septemvri Simitli	4–3	2–0	1–2	1–0	1–1	4–0	3–1	1–0	1–3	2–1	1–0	1–0	0–1	3–0	—	1–0	1–3	1–2	2–1
Slavia Sofia II	3–3	1–1	1–2	1–1	1–1	1–0	2–4	1–1	1–0	0–1	2–1	1–2	2–4	0–2	2–2	—	2–0	2–1	3–1
Slivnishki Geroy	0–1	0–1	3–0	1–0	1–1	3–0	2–2	1–0	1–1	3–3	3–1	1–1	0–0	1–1	0–1	4–0	—	0–1	2–2
Vihren Sandanski	2–1	3–0	3–1	1–0	3–0	6–2	2–0	0–0	3–0	2–0	2–1	2–3	4–2	2–2	1–0	4–1	2–0	—	3–0
Vitosha Bistritsa	2–0	0–1	1–0	1–0	2–1	3–1	0–2	2–1	4–2	3–0	1–2	0–2	2–1	0–0	2–1	2–0	1–2	3–3	—

Updated to match(es) played on 7 June 2025. Source: Bulgarian Football
Legend: Blue = home team win; Yellow = draw; Red = away team win.
For upcoming matches, an "a" indicates there is an article about the rivalry between the two participants.
