= FC Riltsi Dobrich =

Riltsi Dobrich
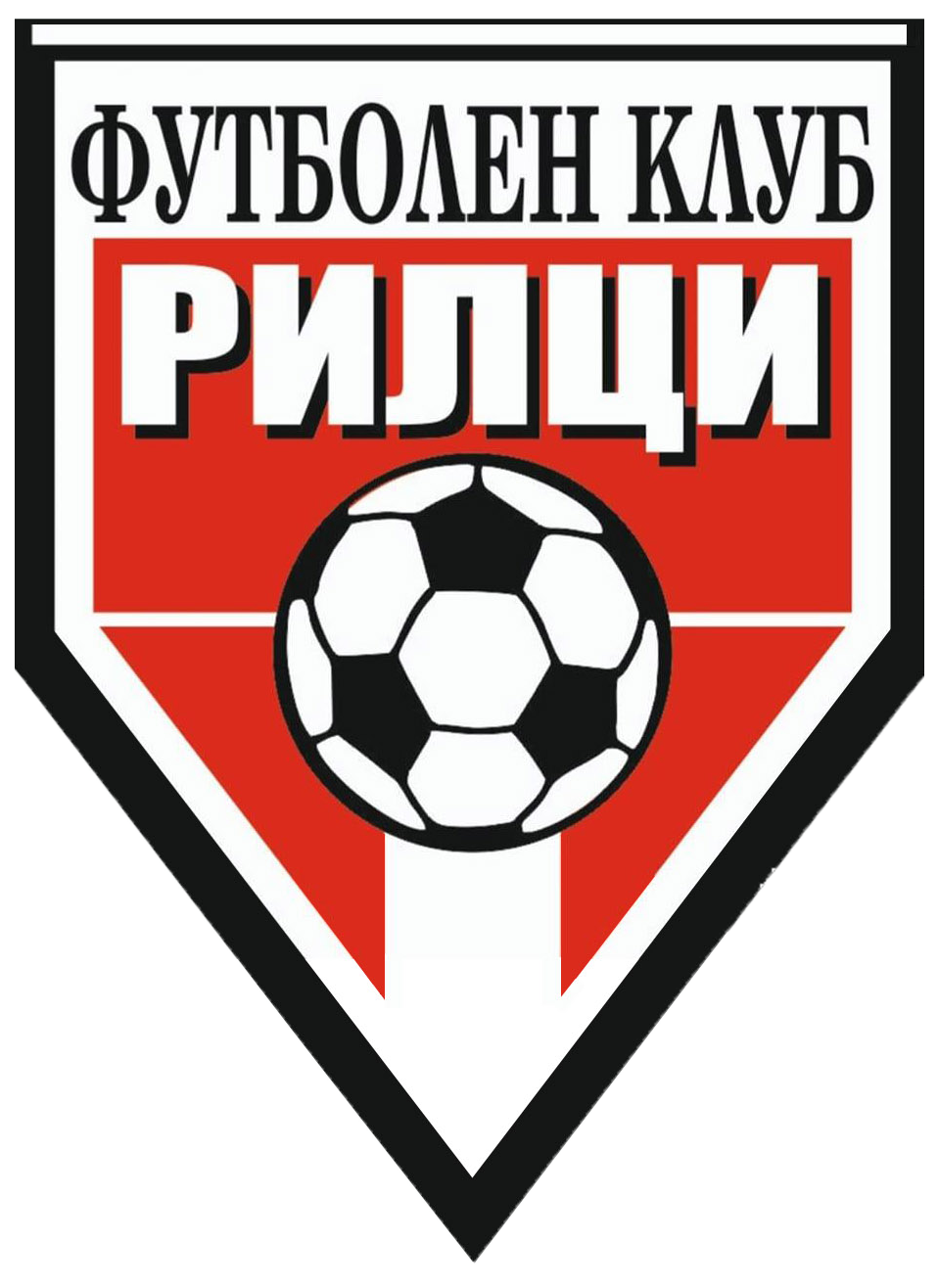
- Full name: Football Club Riltsi Dobrich
- Founded: 9 September 1961; 64 years ago
- Ground: Riltsi
- Capacity: 216
- Manager: Valentin Peychev
- League: Third League
- 2023–24: 9th
- Website: https://fcriltsi.com/
Home colours	Away colours

FC Riltsi Dobrich (Bulgarian: ФК Рилци Добрич) is a Bulgarian association football club based in Riltsi district, Dobrich, which competes in the Third League, the third division of the Bulgarian football league system.

== History ==
The club was established on 9 September 1961 in Riltsi village. In 1983 the village become a neighborhood of Dobrich. They were named Riltsi as a sign of appreciation for the wars of the 53rd Rila Infantry Regiment, which arrived on the last, decisive day of the Battle of Bazargic as reinforcements and contributed to the victory of the Bulgarian arms. It played its home matches at the stadium in Riltsi district. The team mainly played in Regional leagues, until 2020, when the Dobrich legend Valentin Peychev become a manager of the team and won promote to Third League for first time in their history. The team finished 11th of 14th in their first season.

== Shirt and sponsor ==
Period	Kit manufacturer	Shirt partner
2019–2021	(Bulgaria) Krasiko	None
2021–	(Bulgaria) Krasiko	Klas Olio

== Players ==
=== Current squad ===
As of 30 October 2023

Note: Flags indicate national team as defined under FIFA eligibility rules; some limited exceptions apply. Players may hold more than one non-FIFA nationality.

No.	Pos.	Nation	Player
1	GK	BUL	Feday Alimov
2	DF	BUL	Georgi Dimitrov
3	DF	BUL	Boris Petkov
4	MF	BUL	Violin Filipov
6	MF	BUL	Diyan Ivanov
7	MF	BUL	Dian Minchev
8	FW	BUL	Steliyan Tsekov
11	MF	BUL	Dayvid Ventsislavov
15	FW	BUL	Georgi Minchev
16	MF	BUL	Simeon Mitev

No.	Pos.	Nation	Player
19	MF	BUL	Mihail Mihaylov
21	DF	BUL	Gyursel Osman
23	DF	BUL	Dimitar Dimitrov
27	MF	BUL	Daniel Dimov
39	FW	BUL	Velizar Tashev
86	MF	BUL	Ivan Ivanov
80	GK	BUL	Emre Alimov
94	MF	BUL	Barash Nikolaev
99	MF	BUL	Zhoro Yanchev

== Personnel ==
=== Managerial history ===
Dates	Name	Honours
2020–	(Bulgaria) Valentin Peychev	Promotion to Third League, 2020/21

== Seasons ==
=== Past seasons ===
Results of league and cup competitions by season
Season	League											Bulgarian Cup	Other competitions		Top goalscorer	
Season	Division	Level	P	W	D	L	F	A	GD	Pts	Pos	Bulgarian Cup	Other competitions		Top goalscorer	
2014–15	A Regional Dobrich	4	18	7	0	11	37	38	-1	21	6th	DNQ				
2015–16	A Regional Dobrich	4	26	12	2	12	71	51	+20	38	7th	DNQ				
2016–17	A Regional Dobrich	4	20	2	0	18	12	66	-54	6	11th	DNQ				
2017–18	A Regional Dobrich	4	20	1	2	17	15	84	-69	5	11th	DNQ				
2018–19	A Regional Dobrich	4	24	5	1	18	36	81	-45	16	7th	DNQ				
2019–20	A Regional Dobrich	4	11	3	2	6	17	29	-12	11	8th	DNQ				
2020–21	A Regional Dobrich	4	18	13	3	2	52	17	+35	42	2nd ↑	DNQ				
2021–22	Third League	3	26	6	3	17	28	69	-41	21	11th	DNQ	Cup of AFL	R1		
2022–23	Third League	3	28	13	7	8	46	43	+3	46	7th	DNQ	Cup of AFL	R1	(Bulgaria) Dayvid Ventsislavov	14
2023–24	Third League	3	26	9	6	11	40	45	-5	33	9th	DNQ	Cup of AFL	R2	(Bulgaria) Dayvid Ventsislavov	7

==== Key ====
- GS = Group stage
- QF = Quarter-finals
- SF = Semi-finals

Champions	Runners-up	Promoted	Relegated
