= Plamen Nikolov (footballer, born 1961) =

Bulgarian footballer

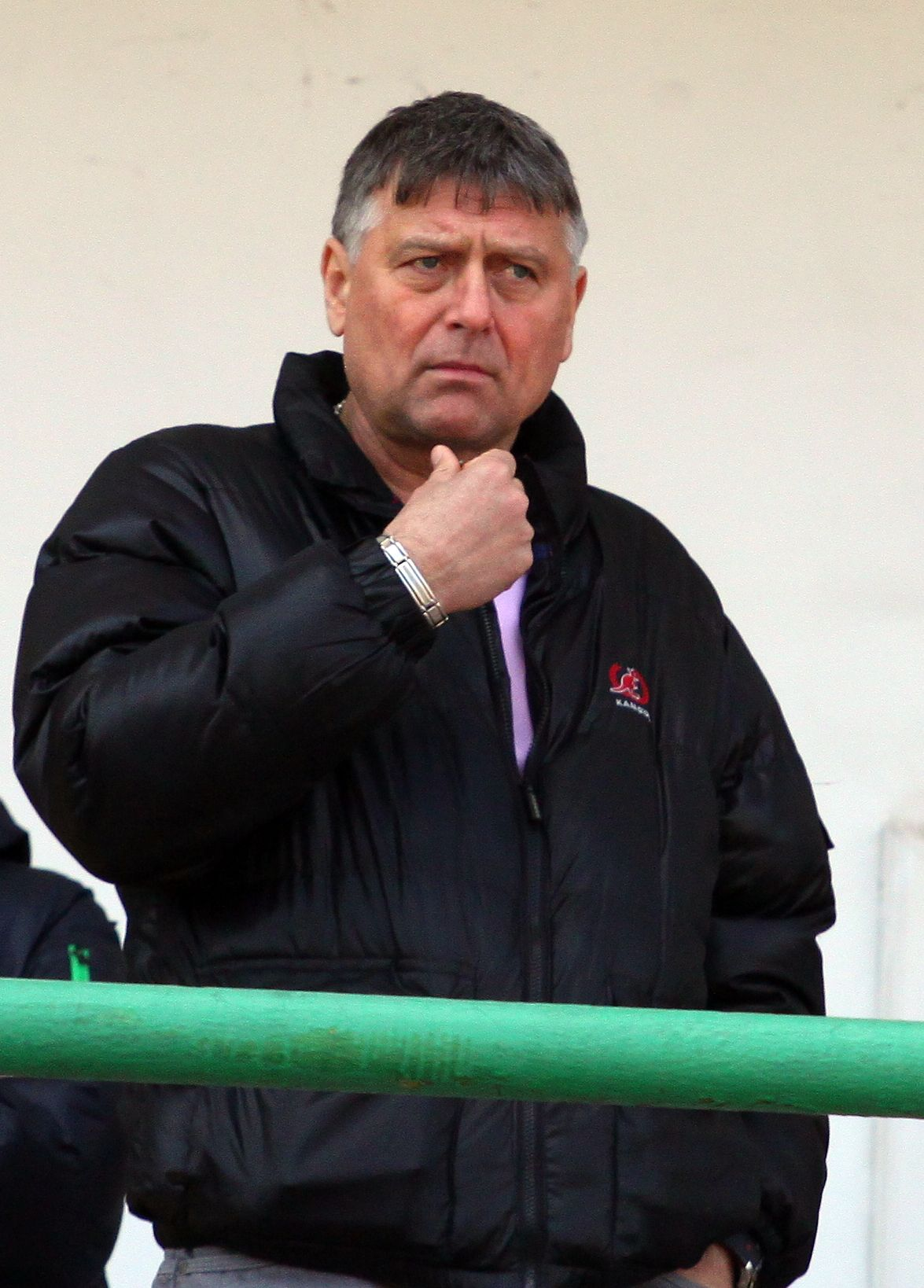

Personal information
- Full name: Plamen Ivanov Nikolov
- Date of birth: 20 August 1961 (age 65)
- Place of birth: Dryanovo, Bulgaria
- Height: 1.85 m (6 ft 1 in)
- Position: Goalkeeper

Youth career
- 1973–1978: Lokomotiv Dryanovo

Senior career*
| Years | Team | Apps | (Gls) |
| 1978–1981 | Lokomotiv Dryanovo | 67 | (0) |
| 1981–1991 | Lokomotiv Sofia | 106 | (0) |
| 1991–1997 | Levski Sofia | 132 | (0) |
| 1997–1998 | Spartak Varna | 2 | (0) |
| 1998 | Septemvri Sofia | 9 | (0) |
| Total | | 333 | (0) |

International career
| 1991–1994 | Bulgaria | 6 | (0) |
- * Club domestic league appearances and goals

Plamen Ivanov Nikolov (Bulgarian: Пламен Иванов Николов; born 20 August 1961) is a former Bulgarian professional footballer who played as a goalkeeper.

Born in Dryanovo, Nikolov started his career at local Lokomotiv Dryanovo. He played 251 games in the Bulgarian First League over 17 seasons, appearing in the competition for Lokomotiv Sofia, Levski Sofia, Spartak Varna and Septemvri Sofia.

Throughout his career, Nikolov earned six caps for the Bulgaria national team and was a member of the squad that reached the semi-finals of the 1994 World Cup. He replaced Borislav Mihaylov in the second half-time during the third place match against Sweden.

== Honours ==
Lokomotiv Sofia

- Bulgarian Cup: 1981–82

Levski Sofia

- A Group: 1992–93, 1993–94, 1994–95
- Bulgarian Cup: 1991–92, 1993–94

Bulgaria

- FIFA World Cup: fourth place 1994
