= Iliyan Marchev =

Bulgarian footballer

Personal information
- Full name: Iliyan Valentinov Marchev
- Date of birth: 9 September 1992 (age 34)
- Place of birth: Asenovgrad, Bulgaria
- Height: 1.81 m (5 ft 11 in)
- Position: Defender

Team information
- Current team: Sayana Haskovo
- Number: 66

Senior career*
Years	Team	Apps	(Gls)
2010–2011	Lokomotiv Plovdiv	0	(0)
2012–2013	Pirin Gotse Delchev	2	(0)
2013–2014	Gigant Saedinenie	41	(3)
2015	Botev Vratsa	12	(0)
2015–2016	N&S Erimis		
2016–2017	Borislav Parvomay		
2017	Hebar Pazardzhik		
2018	Gigant Saedinenie		
2019–	Sayana Haskovo		
- * Club domestic league appearances and goals as of 20:56, 23 September 2024 (UTC)

Iliyan Marchev (Bulgarian: Илиян Марчев; born 9 September 1992) is a Bulgarian footballer who plays as a defender for Sayana Haskovo.
