= OFC Haskovo =

Bulgarian football club

- Full name: United Football Club Haskovo
- Founded: 2012 as Izvor Gorski Izvor
- Ground: Haskovo Stadium
- Capacity: 9000
- Manager: Zhivko Zhelev
- League: Southeast Third League
- 2024–25: 11th
- Website: https://fcsayana.com/
Home colours	Away colours

OFC Haskovo (Bulgarian: ОФК Хасково) is a Bulgarian football club based in Haskovo, that currently plays in the Third Amateur Football League, the third tier of Bulgarian football. Haskovo's home ground is the Haskovo Stadium, which has a capacity of 9 000 spectators. Founded as Izvor Gorski Izvor in 2012, the team was renamed to Sayana in 2021 and moved to Haskovo, keeping the name until 2025, when was renamed to OFC Haskovo.

== History ==
=== Foundation of Izvor ===
In 2012 Izvor was founded in Gorski Izvor, Haskovo Province. In 2020 the team was promoted to the Third Amateur Football League. In their first season the team finished on 10th place.

=== 2021–present: Sayana ownership ===
In 2021, the team was renamed Sayana, under their owner's name, a dairy products company, and was moved to Haskovo. Their first game in the professional football was an away game against Beroe II. In June 2025 the team was renamed to OFC Haskovo. The team is considered a successor to the original team from Haskovo, sharing colors, stadium, and fanbase.

== Current squad ==
As of 28 December 2023

Note: Flags indicate national team as defined under FIFA eligibility rules; some limited exceptions apply. Players may hold more than one non-FIFA nationality.

No.	Pos.	Nation	Player
1	GK	BUL	Diyan Valkov
6	DF	BUL	Beysim Beysim
8	MF	BUL	Vasil Kolev
9	FW	BUL	Hristo Hristov
10	MF	BUL	Krasimir Iliev
11	MF	BUL	Stanislav Dechev
12	GK	BUL	Bogomil Tsintsarski
17	MF	BUL	Berkay Halil
18	DF	BUL	Milen Tanev

No.	Pos.	Nation	Player
21	DF	BUL	Ahmed Osman
23	MF	BUL	Dimitar Shterev
30	MF	BUL	Ivan Angelov
66	DF	BUL	Iliyan Marchev
70	DF	BUL	Kostadin Peev
71	MF	BUL	Angel Kostov
77	MF	BUL	Mitko Plahov
88	MF	BUL	Teodor Dimitrov
90	MF	BUL	Todor Kolev

== Managers ==
Dates	Name	Honours
2021–	(Bulgaria) Zhivko Zhelev	

== Season statistics ==
Results of league and cup competitions by season
Season	League											Bulgarian Cup	Other competitions		Top goalscorer	
Season	Division	Level	P	W	D	L	F	A	GD	Pts	Pos	Bulgarian Cup	Other competitions		Top goalscorer	
2021–22	Third League	3	34	22	8	4	65	17	+48	74	2nd	DNQ	Cup of AFL	SF	(Bulgaria) Angel Zdravchev (Bulgaria) Valchan Chanev	8
2022–23	Third League	3	38	20	9	9	64	36	+28	69	5th	Preliminary round	Cup of AFL	RU	(Bulgaria) Hristo Hristov	14
2023–24	Third League	3										Preliminary round	Cup of AFL		(Bulgaria) Ahmed Osman	14

=== Key ===
- GS = Group stage
- QF = Quarter-finals
- SF = Semi-finals

Champions	Runners-up	Promoted	Relegated
