= Dragoevo =

Dragoevo Драгоево
- Village
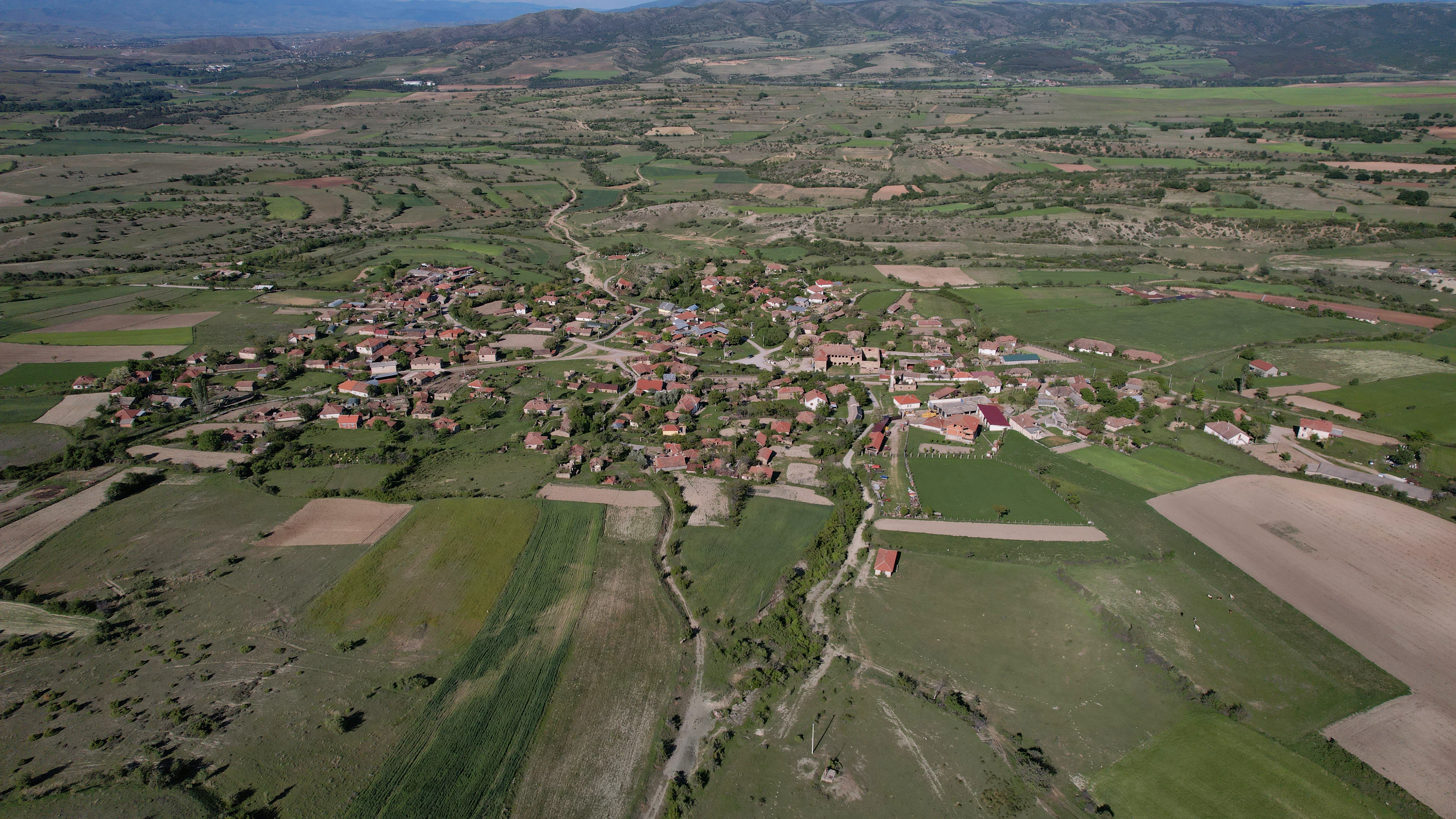
- Air view of the village

- Location within North Macedonia
- Coordinates: 41.672906°N 22.133203°E
- Country: North Macedonia
- Region: Eastern
- Municipality: Štip

Population (2002)
  - Total: 130
- Time zone: UTC+1 (CET)
  - Summer (DST): UTC+2 (CEST)
- Website: .

Dragoevo (Macedonian: Драгоево) is a village in the municipality of Štip, North Macedonia.

== Demographics ==
According to the 2002 census, the village had a total of 130 inhabitants. Ethnic groups in the village include:

- Macedonians 113
- Turks 3
- Aromanians 14

As of 2021, the village of Dragoevo has 83 inhabitants and the ethnic composition was the following:

- Macedonians – 52
- Turks – 6
- Aromanians – 4
- Person without Data - 21
