= FC Lokomotiv Dryanovo =

Bulgarian football club

Lokomotiv
- Full name: FC Lokomotiv Dryanovo
- Founded: 1927; 98 years ago
- Ground: Stadion Lokomotiv, Dryanovo
- Capacity: 3,500
- Chairman: Georgi Valev
- Manager: Petar Krastev
- League: A RFG
- 2022–23: North-West Third League, 16th (relegated)
Home colours	Away colours

FC Lokomotiv Dryanovo (Bulgarian: ФК Локомотив Дряново) is a Bulgarian football club from the town of Dryanovo, currently playing in the A RFG, the fourth tier of Bulgarian football. Its home matches take place at the Stadion Lokomotiv with a 3,500-seat capacity. Club colors are red and black.

The club was officially founded in 1927, after the merging of FC Boyuv Yaz and FC Old Hero. In 1958, the club was a Bulgarian champion of the railwaymen. The club played in this tournament again in 2010. In 1993/94, Lokomotiv Dryanovo qualified for Round of 16 of the Bulgarian Cup, but were eliminated by FC Chirpan after 0–0 in the first leg and 0–3 in the second leg. Plamen Nikolov, Martin Kushev and Stanislav Genchev all are players whose career began at Lokomotiv. In 2005, Lokomotiv Dryanovo went bankrupt, but one year later the club was restored by Georgi Valev.

== Achievements ==
- Bulgarian champion of the railwaymen – 1958
- Bulgarian second division:
  - Second place - 1 time - 1958
  - Third place - 1 time - 1956
- Bulgarian Cup:
  - Round of 16 - 1 time - 1993/94

== Current squad ==
As of 1 August 2020 Note: Flags indicate national team as defined under FIFA eligibility rules; some limited exceptions apply. Players may hold more than one non-FIFA nationality.

No.	Pos.	Nation	Player
1	GK	BUL	Ivan Hristov
2	DF	BUL	Tihomir Trifonov
4	DF	BUL	Daniel Proychev
7	DF	BUL	Yordan Ivanov
8	MF	BUL	Konstantin Yordanov (captain)
9	MF	BUL	Momchil Savov
10	FW	BUL	Racho Ivanov
12	GK	BUL	Stoycho Ganchev

No.	Pos.	Nation	Player
13	DF	BUL	Dencho Shipkaliev
14	FW	BUL	Todor Chirpanov
17	MF	BUL	Georgi Kolev
18	DF	BUL	Atanas Ingilizov
19	MF	BUL	Stanislav Yordanov
20	MF	BUL	Tihomir Marinov
21	MF	BUL	Emil Koparanov
23	MF	BUL	Yavor Genchev

== Notable players ==
- (Bulgaria) Martin Kushev
- (Bulgaria) Stanislav Genchev
- (Bulgaria) Plamen Nikolov
- (Bulgaria) Todor Todorov
