= Bulgarian football league system =

The Bulgarian football league system or the Bulgarian football pyramid, is a series of interconnected leagues for club football in Bulgaria. The system has a hierarchical format with promotion and relegation between leagues at different levels, and allows even the smallest club to dream of rising to the very top of the system.

== History ==
The first organised national tournament was founded in 1924. It was called the National championship (Bulgarian: Държавно първенство). The teams taking part in the tournament were separated in different regional divisions and the winners of each division then played for the Championship title via play-offs.

In 1948, A Republican Football Group (Bulgarian: „А“ Републиканска футболна група) was founded, a new national top division. The second level of the football league system - the B Republican Football Group (Bulgarian: „Б“ Републиканска футболна група) was founded two years later. The lower levels of the pyramid - V Republican Football Group (Bulgarian: „В“ Републиканска футболна група) and below - were structured in 1959.

This system (with minor changes during the years) existed until 2000. Then experimentally a new Bulgarian Premier Football League (Bulgarian: Висша лига по футбол) was founded replacing A Football Group. B Football Group was replaced by the new Bulgarian First Football League (Bulgarian: Първа лига по футбол). But these changes lasted for just three years - in 2003 the old A and B Football Groups were restored at the top of the football pyramid.

From 2016, the top-level league name was changed to First Professional Football League and B Group name to Second Professional Football League.

== Structure ==
Currently the Bulgarian football league system consists of 62 different divisions forming 5 levels of the pyramid:

Level	League/Group			
	Professional Leagues			
1	First League 14 clubs ↓ 1 relegation spots + 2 relegation playoff spot			
2	Second League 20 clubs (16 clubs from 2027–28) ↑ 1 promotion spot + 2 promotion playoff spots ↓ 7 relegation spots + 1 relegation spot			
	Non-professional Leagues			
3	Third League			
3	North-East 15 clubs ↑ 1 promotion playoff spot ↓ 1 relegation spot + TBD relegation playoff spots	North-West 11 clubs ↑ 1 promotion playoff spot ↓ 1 relegation spot + TBD relegation playoff spots	South-East 18 clubs ↑ 1 promotion spot ↓ 2 relegation spots	South-West 18 clubs ↑ 1 promotion spot ↓ 3 relegation spots
4	A OFGs (A OFGs - A Oblast Football Groups) 36 in total (all divisions run in parallel): A OFG Blagoevgrad Mesta; A OFG Blagoevgrad Struma; A OFG Burgas; A OFG Varna; A OFG Veliko Tarnovo; A OFG Vidin; A OFG Vratsa; A OFG Gabrovo; A OFG Dobrich; A OFG Kardzhali/Smolyan; A OFG Kyustendil Osogovo; A OFG Kyustendil Rila; A OFG Lovech; A OFG Montana; A OFG Pazardzhik I; A OFG Pazardzhik II; A OFG Pernik I; A OFG Pernik II; A OFG Pleven; A OFG Plovdiv I; A OFG Plovdiv II; A OFG Razgrad; A OFG Ruse; A OFG Silistra East; A OFG Silistra West; A OFG Sliven; A OFG Sofia (capital); A OFG Sofia West; A OFG Sofia East; A OFG Stara Zagora; A OFG Targovishte; A OFG Haskovo; A OFG Shumen North; A OFG Shumen Center; A OFG Shumen South; A OFG Yambol			
5	B OFGs (B OFGs - B Oblast Football Groups) 20 in total (all divisions run in parallel): B OFG Blagoevgrad Mesta West; B OFG Blagoevgrad Mesta East; B OFG Blagoevgrad Struma; B OFG Burgas West; B OFG Burgas Center; B OFG Burgas East; B OFG Varna; B OFG Veliko Tarnovo North; B OFG Veliko Tarnovo South; B OFG Vratsa; B OFG Dobrich; B OFG Pazardzhik; B OFG Pleven West; B OFG Pleven East; B OFG Plovdiv North; B OFG Plovdiv Center; B OFG Plovdiv East; B OFG Ruse; B OFG Sofia (capital) North; B OFG Sofia (capital) South			
