= Regional Amateur Football Groups (Bulgaria) =

- Founded: 1998; 28 years ago
- Country: Bulgaria
- Number of clubs: 300+
- Level on pyramid: 4 and 5
- Promotion to: Third League
- Domestic cup: Cup of Bulgarian AFL

The Bulgarian Regional Amateur Football Groups (Bulgarian: Областни Аматьорски Футболни Групи, romanized: Oblastni Amat'orski Futbolni Grupi) are the 4th and 5th level of the Bulgarian football league system. There are 41 groups called A Regional Football Groups and 19 B Regional Football Groups. Teams from B RFG are promoted to A RFG and A RFG teams are promoted to Third League.

== Competition format ==
A RFG (or A OFG) has 28 regional geographically specified divisions, as some of the regions have more than one group. 28 teams are promoted to Third League at the end of every season. there are 9 B RFG (or B OFG) divisions registered for season 2015–16. Every region decides how many groups it will have since it depends on how many teams want to join.

== Overview ==
=== A Regional Football Groups ===
- A OFG Blagoevgrad Struma North
- A OFG Blagoevgrad Struma South
- A OFG Blagoevgrad Bistritsa
- A OFG Blagoevgrad Mesta West
- A OFG Blagoevgrad Mesta East
- A OFG Burgas
- A OFG Varna
- A OFG Veliko Tarnovo
- A OFG Vidin
- A OFG Vratsa
- A OFG Gabrovo
- A OFG Dobrich West
- A OFG Dobrich East
- A Regional Kardzhali/Smolyan
- A OFG Kyustendil Osogovo
- A OFG Kyustendil Rila
- A OFG Lovech
- A OFG Montana
- A OFG Pazardzhik
- A OFG Pernik North
- A OFG Pernik South
- A OFG Pleven
- A OFG Plovdiv
- A OFG Razgrad West
- A OFG Razgrad East
- A OFG Rousse West
- A OFG Rousse East
- A OFG Silistra West
- A OFG Silistra East
- A OFG Sliven
- A OFG Smolyan
- A OFG Sofia (city) North
- A OFG Sofia (city) South
- A OFG Sofia West
- A OFG Sofia East
- A OFG Stara Zagora
- A OFG Targovishte
- A OFG Haskovo
- A OFG Shumen North
- A OFG Shumen South
- A OFG Yambol

=== B Regional Football groups ===
- B OFG Burgas North
- B OFG Burgas South
- B OFG Varna
- B OFG Veliko Tarnovo North
- B OFG Veliko Tarnovo South
- B OFG Vratsa
- B OFG Montana North
- B OFG Montana South
- B OFG Pazardzhik North
- B OFG Pazardzhik South
- B OFG Pleven West
- B OFG Pleven Centre
- B OFG Pleven East
- B OFG Plovdiv North
- B OFG Plovdiv West
- B OFG Plovdiv Centre
- B OFG Plovdiv East
- B OFG Plovdiv South
- B OFG Yambol

== See also ==
- Football in Bulgaria
