= Third Amateur Football League (Bulgaria) =

- Founded: 1950; 76 years ago
- Country: Bulgaria
- Number of clubs: 65; 12 North-West; 17 North-East; 18 South-East; 18 South-West (for 2026–27)
- Level on pyramid: 3
- Promotion to: Second League
- Relegation to: Regional Groups
- Domestic cup(s): Bulgarian Cup; Cup of Bulgarian AFL
- Current champions: Chernomorets Balchik (North-East); Nesebar (South-East); Lokomotiv Mezdra (North-West); Rilski Sportist (South-West)
- Broadcaster(s): sportal.bg
- Current: 2026–27 season

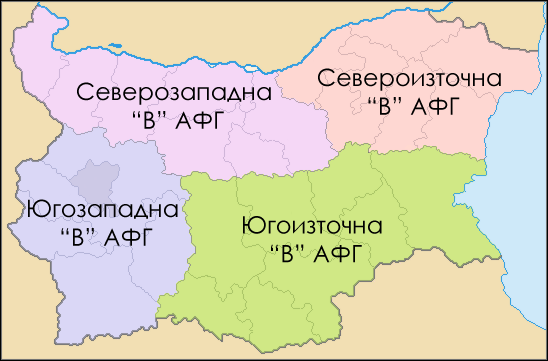

The Bulgarian Third Amateur Football League (Bulgarian: Трета аматьорска футболна лига, romanized: Treta Amat'orska Futbolna Liga), commonly known as Treta Liga or Bulgarian Third League (currently known as the ELITBET Third League for sponsorship reasons), is the third level of the Bulgarian football league system. Third League operates on a system of promotion and relegation with the second and the fourth tier of the Bulgarian football league pyramid – respectively being Second League and the A Oblast Groups. Currently Third League consists of four divisions that are formed by separating the country into four regions: North-West, South-West, North-East and South-East. The divisions run in parallel during the season, but since the number of teams in each division may vary, the number of rounds in each of them may vary. Each team must play at least two times against every other team on a home-away basis.

The Third League was created in 1950, along with the second level. It is administered by the Bulgarian Football Union, and the clubs in it have an amateur status. Nowadays, only the top teams of each division have the right to participate in the Bulgarian Cup tournament, but since 1995 the clubs in the group can participate in the Cup of Bulgarian Amateur Football League competition.

== Overview ==
The Third League was created in 1950 as the third level of the Bulgarian football league system, along with the second tier in the same pyramid - Second League. The name then - "V group", is derived from the fact that "V" (Bulgarian: "В") is the third letter of the Cyrillic alphabet so the third level of the football pyramid is named after the third letter of the alphabet (and A Group and B Group are respectively the first and the second).

While the first two levels in the football pyramid - (A Group) and (B Group) - are professional, the third level is of amateur status and does not require professional licensing for the team. The amateur status of the third tier has resulted in the level being officially named V Amateur Football Group (or similar) on several occasions throughout the years, so V Group is commonly abbreviated "V AFG". From 2016 the league is renamed "Third Amateur Football League"

The Third League has historically been divided into four different groups running in simultaneously (North-West TAFL, South-West TAFL, North-East TAFL and South-East TAFL). Each group is managed by a different administrative football zone center - Sofia for South-West, Plovdiv for South-East, Varna for North-East, and Veliko Tarnovo for North-West.

There are two domestic cups, in which every club from the Third League is competing in - the Bulgarian Cup and the Cup of Bulgarian Amateur Football League.

== Competition format ==
The Bulgarian Third Amateur Football League has four geographically specified divisions, running in parallel: North-West TAFL, South-West TAFL, North-East TAFL and South-East TAFL. The size of each group is based on the geographical location of the clubs, where in each group are participating between 15 and 22 teams.

In all groups, every team must play twice with each other club in the group during the season - one time as home team and one time as away team. A team receives three points for a win and one point for a draw. No points are awarded for a loss. The matches of each fixture in Third League are played every Sunday.

The four champions from the four different groups of the Third League can be promoted to the higher division in Bulgarian football - Second League. Promotion is earned either directly by becoming a champion in the respective group, or through play-offs determining the teams to be promoted to Second League for the next season.

The teams, which that finish at the last positions in their groups are relegated from the Third League, in the next season compete in their respective regional group.

As of season 2022–23, the four champions of the four Third League divisions are directly promoted to Second League for the next season given that they acquire a professional licence needed to participate at the higher level. If a club does not acquire a licence, typically, the Executive Committee of the Bulgarian Football Union would decide what other team may be eligible for promotion and whether a play-off tournament is needed to fill the spot of the non-eligible club. The bottom one to two teams of each division are directly relegated to their respective regional group at the fourth level of the pyramid.

== See also ==
- Football in Bulgaria
