= 2026–27 FC Fratria season =

Fratria
2026–27 season
- Chairman: Viktor Bakurevich
- Manager: Renārs Rode
- Stadium: Spartak Stadium, Varna
- Second League: TBA
- Bulgarian Cup: TBA
Home colours	Away colours

The 2026–27 season is the 6th season in the history of FC Fratria and their third season in the Second League. In addition to the domestic league, the club would also participate in the Bulgarian Cup.

== Staff ==
Position	Name	Nationality
Coaching staff
Head coach	Renārs Rode	(Latvia)
Assistant coach	Yevhen Lutsenko	(Ukraine)
Assistant coach	Yura Podolchuk	(Ukraine)
Assistant coach	Fernando Rueda Garcia	(Argentina)
Goalkeepers coach	Oleksandr Lavrentsov	(Ukraine)
Conditioning coach	Atanas Stefanov	(Bulgaria)
Fitness coach	Oleksiy Dovhyi	(Ukraine)
Doctor	Hryhoriy Makarov	(Ukraine)
Administrator	Evgeni Nikolaev	(Bulgaria)
Administrator	Artur Napilov	(Ukraine)
Management
Chairman	Viktor Bakurevich	(Russia) (Bulgaria)
Sports director	Denys Vasin	(Ukraine)
Technical director	Tsvetan Ivanov	(Bulgaria)
Academy director	Viktor Ulyanytskyi	(Ukraine)

== Squad ==
As of 11 September 2026

Note: Flags indicate the national team as has been defined under FIFA eligibility rules. Players may hold more than one non-FIFA nationality.

Squad no.	Player	Nationality	Position(s)	Date of birth (age)	Matches	Goals	Signed in	Previous club
Goalkeepers
1	Galin Grigorov	(Bulgaria)	GK	31 October 2003 (age 22)	0	0	2026	(Bulgaria) Dobrudzha
12	Stanislav Tanev	(Bulgaria)	GK	28 March 2007 (age 19)	2	0	2026	(Bulgaria) CSKA Sofia II
69	Iliyan Iliev	(Bulgaria)	GK	19 June 2005 (age 21)	8	0	2026 (winter)	(Bulgaria) Spartak Pleven
99	Vladyslav Ukrainskyi	(Ukraine)	GK	24 May 2008 (age 18)	0	0	2021	Youth system
Defenders
4	Kristiyan Peshov	(Bulgaria)	RW / RB	16 June 1997 (age 29)	20	0	2026 (winter)	(Bulgaria) Botev Vratsa
5	Georgi Ivanov	(Bulgaria)	CB	22 May 2009 (age 17)	0	0	2025	(Bulgaria) CSKA 1948 U17
11	Velislav Boev	(Bulgaria)	LB / LW	19 December 2003 (age 22)	7	0	2026	(Bulgaria) Yantra Gabrovo
13	Arhan Isuf	(Bulgaria)	RB / CB	25 January 1999 (age 27)	38	1	2025	(Bulgaria) Krumovgrad
14	Viktorio Valkov	(Bulgaria)	CB	26 May 2006 (age 20)	3	1	2026	(Bulgaria) Beroe
18	David Mihalev	(Bulgaria)	RB / CB	27 March 2006 (age 20)	5	0	2026	(Bulgaria) Sevlievo
44	Rosen Stefanov	(Bulgaria)	CB	10 October 2002 (age 24)	8	1	2026	(Bulgaria) Cherno More Varna
71	Ibryam Ibryam	(Bulgaria)	CB / LB	12 January 2001 (age 25)	79	4	2023	(Bulgaria) Dobrudzha Dobrich
90	Vadim Dijinari	(Moldova)	CB / LB	1 April 1999 (age 27)	10	2	2026 (winter)	(Moldova) Petrocub Hîncești
	Martin Kostadinov	(Bulgaria)	LB / LW	13 May 1996 (age 30)	53	5	2023	(Bulgaria) Dunav Ruse
Midfielders
6	Aleksandar Tsvetkov	(Bulgaria)	DM / CB	31 August 1990 (age 36)	28	1	2025	(Bulgaria) Spartak Varna
8	Rumen Rumenov	(Bulgaria)	CM / DM	7 June 1993 (age 33)	28	3	2025	(Bulgaria) Dobrudzha Dobrich
10	Tymur Korablin	(Ukraine)	CM / AM	2 January 2002 (age 24)	22	3	2026 (winter)	(Ukraine) Zorya Luhansk
17	Bilal Kandoussi	(Spain)	LW / RW / AM	17 February 2000 (age 26)	8	2	2026	(Spain) CD Arenteiro
21	Iliyan Kapitanov	(Bulgaria)	LW / RW / AM	21 May 1992 (age 34)	63	11	2024	(Bulgaria) Litex Lovech
22	Georgi Atanasov	(Bulgaria)	LW / RW	6 March 2004 (age 22)	18	1	2026 (winter)	(Bulgaria) FC Sportist Svoge
23	Stanislav Dyulgerov	(Bulgaria)	DM / CM	23 August 2003 (age 23)	8	1	2026	(Bulgaria) Yantra Gabrovo
76	Diego Gutiérrez	(Spain)	DM / CM	3 September 2000 (age 26)	8	1	2026	(Spain) CP Cacereño
	Aleksandar Bozhilov	(Bulgaria)	AM / CM	23 February 2006 (age 20)	0	0	2026	(Bulgaria) CSKA II
Forwards
9	Denislav Angelov	(Bulgaria)	ST / LW / RW	8 June 2001 (age 25)	28	10	2026 (Note: Left Fratria in 2025, before return in 2026.)	(Bulgaria) Yantra Gabrovo
13	Todor Kolev	(Bulgaria)	ST	24 April 2010 (age 16)	2	0	2024	Youth system
14	Ivan Pavlov	(Bulgaria)	ST	20 September 2008 (age 18)	2	0	2024	Youth system
15	Miroslav Marinov	(Bulgaria)	ST	7 March 2004 (age 22)	39	14	2025	(Bulgaria) Botev Vratsa
	Georgi Trifonov	(Bulgaria)	ST	13 February 2002 (age 24)	0	0	2026	(Bulgaria) Spartak Varna (loan)
Out on Loan
Left Permanently During the Season
1	Mario Mladenov	(Bulgaria)	GK	1 August 2006 (age 20)	0	0	2026	(Bulgaria) Dunav Ruse
2	Dimitar Yaramov	(Bulgaria)	RB	19 October 2007 (age 19)	0	0	2026	(Bulgaria) Belasitsa Petrich
7	Denys Yanakov	(Ukraine)	LW / RW	1 January 1999 (age 27)	2	0	2026	(Romania) Unirea Slobozia
20	Maksim Marinov	(Bulgaria)	ST / AM	22 April 2008 (age 18)	26	0	2023	(Bulgaria) Ludogorets Razgrad Academy
26	Georgi Paskov	(Bulgaria)	DM / CM	23 October 2006 (age 20)	0	0	2026	(Bulgaria) Cherno More

== Transfers ==
For all recent transfers, see Transfers summer 2026 and Transfers winter 2026–27.

=== In ===
No.	Pos.	Nat.	Name	Age	EU	Moving from	Type	Transfer window	Ends	Transfer fee	Source
7	MF	(Ukraine)	Demyan Yesin	19	Non-EU	(Italy) Calvi Noale	transfer	Summer		Free	
9	FW	(Bulgaria)	Denislav Angelov	25	EU	(Bulgaria) Yantra Gabrovo	transfer	Summer		Free	
	DF	(Bulgaria)	David Mihalev	22	EU	(Bulgaria) Sevlievo	transfer	Summer		Free	
23	MF	(Bulgaria)	Stanislav Dyulgerov	22	EU	(Bulgaria) Yantra Gabrovo	transfer	Summer		Free	
44	DF	(Bulgaria)	Rosen Stefanov	23	EU	(Bulgaria) Cherno More Varna	transfer	Summer		Free	
17	MF	(Spain)	Bilal Kandoussi	26	EU	(Spain) CD Arenteiro	transfer	Summer		Free	
11	DF	(Bulgaria)	Velislav Boev	22	EU	(Bulgaria) Yantra Gabrovo	transfer	Summer		Free	
	DF	(Bulgaria)	Dimitar Yaramov	18	EU	(Bulgaria) Belasitsa Petrich	transfer	Summer		Free	
	MF	(Spain)	Diego Gutiérrez	25	EU	(Spain) CP Cacereño	transfer	Summer		Free	
	GK	(Bulgaria)	Stanislav Tanev	19	EU	(Bulgaria) CSKA Sofia II	transfer	Summer		Free	
	GK	(Ukraine)	Denys Yanakov	27	EU	(Romania) Unirea Slobozia	transfer	Summer		Free	

=== Out ===
No.	Pos.	Nat.	Name	Age	EU	Moving to	Type	Transfer window	Transfer fee	Source
33	GK	(Moldova)	Igor Mostovei	26	EU	(Lithuania) FK TransINVEST	End of contract	Summer	Free	
98	FW	(Bulgaria)	Valentin Yoskov	27	EU	(Bulgaria) Chernomorets Burgas	Released	Summer	Free	
10	FW	(Suriname)	Xavello Druiventak	22	EU	Released	End of contract	Summer	Free	
25	FW	(Bulgaria)	Daniel Halachev	21	EU	(Bulgaria) Spartak Varna	End of loan	Summer	Loan	
11	MF	(Bulgaria)	Viktor Mitev	34	EU	Released	Released	Summer	Free	
7	MF	(Bulgaria)	Ayvan Angelov	22	EU	(Bulgaria) Yantra Gabrovo	Released	Summer	Free	
3	DF	(Bulgaria)	Aleksandar Angelov	24	EU	(Moldova) Milsami Orhei	End of contract	Summer	Free	
23	MF	(Ukraine)	Ivan Brikner	32	Non-EU	(Bulgaria) Chernomorets Burgas	Released	Summer	Free	
9	MF	(Bulgaria)	Denis Kadir	27	EU	(Bulgaria) Septemvri Tervel	End of Contract	Summer	Free	

== Pre-season and friendlies ==
Win Draw Loss Fixtures

26 June 2026 Pre-season	(Romania) Farul Constanța	1–1	Fratria	Ovidiu, Romania
			Angelov	Stadium: Central Stadium

10 July 2026 Pre-season	Lokomotiv Gorna Oryahovitsa	2–1	Fratria	Gorna Oryahovitsa
	Tymur Korablin Roberts Bočs			Stadium: Lokomotiv Stadium

10 July 2026 Pre-season	Yantra Gabrovo	1–0	Fratria	Gabrovo
				Stadium: Stadion Hristo Botev

15 July 2026 Pre-season	Nesebar	1–2	Fratria	Obzor
				Stadium: Obzor Stadium

18 July 2026 Pre-season	Fratria	v	Chernomorets Balchik

== Competitions ==
=== Vtora Liga ===
==== League table ====
Pos	Team	Pld	W	D	L	GF	GA	GD	Pts	
1	CSKA Sofia II	13	7	4	2	26	12	+14	25	Ineligible for promotion
2	Vihren	13	7	4	2	26	13	+13	25	Promotion to the First League
3	Chernomorets Burgas	13	7	4	2	22	9	+13	25	Qualification for the promotion play-off
4	Fratria Varna	13	6	4	3	18	12	+6	22	Qualification for the promotion play-off
5	Beroe	13	6	3	4	21	16	+5	21	
6	Lokomotiv Gorna Oryahovitsa	13	5	5	3	11	10	+1	20	
7	Hebar	13	6	2	5	29	21	+8	20	

Updated to match(es) played on 28 October 2026. Source: bulgarian-football.com
Rules for classification: 1) Points; 2) Head-to-head points; 3) Head-to-head goal difference; 4) Head-to-head goals scored; 5) Head-to-head away goals scored (only if two teams); 6) Goal difference; 7) Goals scored; 8) Fairplay ranking; 9) Draw.

==== Matches ====
Win Draw Loss Fixtures

=== Bulgarian Cup ===
==== Matches ====
Win Draw Loss Fixtures

== Statistics ==
=== Appearances and goals ===
No.	Pos	Nat	Player	Total		Second League		Bulgarian Cup	
No.	Pos	Nat	Player	Apps	Goals	Apps	Goals	Apps	Goals
1	GK	(Bulgaria) BUL	Galin Grigorov	0	0	0	0	0	0
4	DF	(Bulgaria) BUL	Kristiyan Peshov	8	0	7+1	0	0	0
5	DF	(Bulgaria) BUL	Georgi Ivanov	0	0	0	0	0	0
6	MF	(Bulgaria) BUL	Aleksandar Tsvetkov	1	0	0+1	0	0	0
8	MF	(Bulgaria) BUL	Rumen Rumenov	6	0	1+5	0	0	0
9	FW	(Bulgaria) BUL	Denislav Angelov	8	2	6+2	2	0	0
10	MF	(Ukraine) UKR	Tymur Korablin	8	2	7+1	2	0	0
11	MF	(Bulgaria) BUL	Velislav Boev	7	0	7	0	0	0
12	GK	(Bulgaria) BUL	Stanislav Tanev	2	0	1+1	0	0	0
13	DF	(Bulgaria) BUL	Arhan Isuf	7	0	3+4	0	0	0
14	DF	(Bulgaria) BUL	Viktorio Valkov	3	1	3	1	0	0
15	FW	(Bulgaria) BUL	Miroslav Marinov	8	0	7+1	0	0	0
16	MF	(Bulgaria) BUL	Todor Kolev	0	0	0	0	0	0
17	MF	(Spain) ESP	Bilal Kandoussi	8	2	6+2	2	0	0
18	DF	(Bulgaria) BUL	David Mihalev	5	0	5	0	0	0
21	MF	(Bulgaria) BUL	Iliyan Kapitanov	5	1	1+4	1	0	0
22	MF	(Bulgaria) BUL	Georgi Atanasov	8	0	2+6	0	0	0
23	MF	(Bulgaria) BUL	Stanislav Dyulgerov	8	1	7+1	1	0	0
44	DF	(Bulgaria) BUL	Rosen Stefanov	8	1	8	1	0	0
69	GK	(Bulgaria) BUL	Iliyan Iliev	7	0	7	0	0	0
71	DF	(Bulgaria) BUL	Ibryam Ibryam	2	0	0+2	0	0	0
76	MF	(Spain) ESP	Diego Gutiérrez	8	1	8	1	0	0
81	MF	(Bulgaria) BUL	Ivan Pavlov	0	0	0	0	0	0
90	DF	(Moldova) MDA	Vadim Dijinari	0	0	0	0	0	0
99	GK	(Ukraine) UKR	Vladyslav Ukrainskyi	0	0	0	0	0	0
	MF	(Bulgaria) BUL	Aleksandar Bozhilov	0	0	0	0	0	0
	FW	(Bulgaria) BUL	Georgi Trifonov	0	0	0	0	0	0
Player(s) who left on loan but featured this season
Player(s) who left permanently but featured this season
1	GK	(Bulgaria) BUL	Mario Mladenov	0	0	0	0	0	0
2	DF	(Bulgaria) BUL	Dimitar Yaramov	0	0	0	0	0	0
7	MF	(Ukraine) UKR	Denys Yanakov	8	0	2+6	0	0	0
20	FW	(Bulgaria) BUL	Maksim Marinov	0	0	0	0	0	0
26	MF	(Bulgaria) BUL	Georgi Paskov	0	0	0	0	0	0
