= 2026–27 Bulgarian Cup =

Sesame Купа на България

Tournament details
- Country: Bulgaria
- Teams: 50

Tournament statistics
- Matches played: 34
- Goals scored: 116 (3.41 per match)
- Top goal scorer(s): (Bulgaria) Mariyan Vangelov (5 goals)
- All statistics correct as of 21 October 2026.

The 2026–27 Bulgarian Cup is the 45th official edition of the Bulgarian annual football knockout tournament. It is sponsored by Sesame and known as the Sesame Kupa na Bulgaria for sponsorship purposes. The competition began on 3 October 2026 with the preliminary round and finish with the final on 19 May 2027. CSKA Sofia are the defending cup winners. The winner qualifies for the first qualifying round of the 2027–28 UEFA Europa League.

Times up to 24 October 2026 and from 28 March 2027 are EEST (UTC+3). Times from 25 October 2026 to 27 March 2027 are EET (UTC+2).

== Participating clubs ==
The following 50 teams qualified for the competition:

**2026–27 First League**; 14 clubs	**2026–27 Second League**; 16 non-reserve clubs	**Winners of 4 regional competitions** 20 clubs
**Arda**; **Botev Plovdiv**; **Botev Vratsa**; **CSKA 1948**; **CSKA Sofia**; **Cherno More**; **Dunav Ruse**; **Levski Sofia**; **Lokomotiv Plovdiv**; **Lokomotiv Sofia**; **Ludogorets**; Septemvri Sofia; **Slavia Sofia**; **Spartak Varna**	Beroe; Chernomorets Burgas; **Dobrudzha**; Etar; Fratria Varna; **Hebar**; **Lokomotiv Gorna Oryahovitsa**; Marek; Montana; Nesebar; Pirin Blagoevgrad; Rilski Sportist; Spartak Pleven; Sportist Svoge; Vihren; Yantra	from North-East zone: Benkovski Isperih; Botev Novi Pazar; Chernomorets Balchik; Volov Shumen; from North-West zone: Akademik Svishtov; Bdin Vidin; Chavdar Troyan; Lokomotiv Mezdra; from South-West zone: Balkan Botevgrad; Belasitsa; Botev Ihtiman; Minyor Pernik; National Sofia; Oborishte; from South-East zone: Krumovgrad; Neftochimic; Rodopa Smolyan; Spartak Plovdiv; Yambol; Zagorets

Teams in bold still active in the competition.

== Preliminary round ==
The draw was conducted on 23 September 2026. In this stage, the participants were 20 winners from the regional amateur competitions and 16 non-reserve teams from the Second League. The games were played on 3 and 4 October 2026.

3 October 2026	Krumovgrad (III)	1–2	Spartak Pleven (II)	Krumovgrad
14:00 UTC+3	Marchev 31'	Report	Antonov 75'; Adelani 85'	Stadium: Sporten kompleks Krumovgrad; Referee: Ivo Ivanov (Svishtov)

3 October 2026	Botev Novi Pazar (III)	1–4	Vihren (II)	Kaspichan (Note: Botev Novi Pazar played their preliminary round home match at Gradski stadion, Kaspichan, instead of their regular stadium, Gradski stadion in Novi Pazar.)
14:00 UTC+3	Nikolov 46'	Report	Ivov 28', 69', 85' (pen.); Al Badarin 88'	Stadium: Gradski stadion Referee: Krasimir Krastev (Shumen)

3 October 2026	Balkan Botevgrad (III)	0–3	Fratria Varna (II)	Botevgrad
14:00 UTC+3		Report	Angelov 9'; Kandoussi 37'; Metanov 53' (o.g.)	Stadium: Stadion Hristo Botev; Referee: Petar Nikolov (Sofia)

3 October 2026	Chernomorets Balchik (III)	2–3	Etar (II)	Balchik
14:00 UTC+3	Myurvet 7'; Nachev 81'	Report	Dobrev 22'; Radev 45' (o.g.); Tsvetkov 59'	Stadium: Stadion Balchik; Referee: Kristian Todorov (Varna)

4 October 2026	Belasitsa (III)	1–2	Dobrudzha (II)	Petrich
13:00 UTC+3	Dimitrov 90+4'	Report	Vakadinov 9'; Halachev 82'	Stadium: Stadion Tsar Samuil; Referee: Mariyan Grebencharski (Samokov)

4 October 2026	Oborishte (III)	1–3	Yantra (II)	Panagyurishte
14:00 UTC+3	Belmustakov 65'	Report	Dimitrov 11'; Ivanov 73'; Portarski 76'	Stadium: Stadion Orcho Voyvoda; Referee: Georgi Spasov (Sofía)

4 October 2026	Minyor Pernik (III)	1–2	Beroe (II)	Pernik
14:00 UTC+3	Valchev 24' (o.g.)	Report	Diamanka 33'; Ferrer 89'	Stadium: Stadion Minyor; Referee: Georgi Novachev (Dobrich)

4 October 2026	Volov Shumen (III)	0–2	Chernomorets Burgas (II)	Shumen
15:00 UTC+3		Report	Petkov 56', 66'	Stadium: Stadion Panayot Volov; Referee: Boris Popov (Ruse)

4 October 2026	Lokomotiv Mezdra (III)	2–3 (a.e.t.)	Pirin Blagoevgrad (II)	Mezdra
15:00 UTC+3	Lashkov 12'; Kaloyanov 67'	Report	Ivanov 71'; Kostov 73'; Petsev 107'	Stadium: Stadion Lokomotiv; Referee: Valentin Stefanov (Sofía)

4 October 2026	Bdin Vidin (III)	0–2 (a.e.t.)	Montana (II)	Vidin
15:00 UTC+3		Report	Milushev 103'; Vasilev 110'	Stadium: Stadion Georgi Benkovski; Referee: Petar Nikolov (Sofia)

4 October 2026	National Sofia (III)	1–3	Lokomotiv Gorna Oryahovitsa (II)	Sofia
15:00 UTC+3	Pamukov 23'	Report	Ivanov 34', 52'; Avramov 36'	Stadium: Sporten kompleks NSA; Referee: Petar Yankov (Stara Zagora)

4 October 2026	Rodopa Smolyan (III)	1–3 (a.e.t.)	Nesebar (II)	Smolyan
15:00 UTC+3	Stefanov 22'	Report	Parashkevov 90' (pen.); Simeonov 118'; Statev 119'	Stadium: Stadion Septemvri; Referee: Nikolay Zapryanov (Plovdiv)

4 October 2026	Zagorets (III)	0–4	Rilski Sportist (II)	Nova Zagora
15:00 UTC+3		Report	Quihunga 5'; Rusinov 18'; Boychev 74', 86'	Stadium: Stadion Zagorets; Referee: Vladimir Kirilov (Pleven)

4 October 2026	Neftochimic (III)	1–1 (a.e.t.) (3−2 p)	Sportist Svoge (II)	Burgas
15:00 UTC+3	Solakov 74'	Report	Jorson 42'	Stadium: Stadion Lazur; Referee: Bozhidar Todorov (Sofia)
	Penalties
	Krastev (penalty scored); Hyusein (penalty missed); Solakov (penalty missed); Radev (penalty missed); Madzharov (penalty scored); Tachev (penalty scored)		(penalty scored) Karchev; (penalty scored) Ivanov; (penalty missed) Jorson; (penalty missed) Nzila; (penalty missed) Dobrev; (penalty missed) Atanasov

4 October 2026	Yambol (III)	0–5	Hebar (II)	Yambol
15:00 UTC+3		Report	Cabo 13'; Vangelov 17', 49', 84'; Sadetinov 23'	Stadium: Stadion Tundzha; Referee: Petar Dimitrov (Sofia)

4 October 2026	Chavdar Troyan (III)	0–4	Marek (II)	Troyan
15:00 UTC+3		Report	Petkov 11'; Lyubomirov 16'; Goranov 34'; Plyakov 59'	Stadium: Stadion Chavdar; Referee: Murad Adem (Sofia)

4 October 2026	Spartak Plovdiv (III)	1–0	Botev Ihtiman (III)	Plovdiv
15:00 UTC+3	Aytov 9' (pen.)	Report		Stadium: Stadion Todor Diev; Referee: Svetoslav Lazarov (Burgas)

4 October 2026	Benkovski Isperih (III)	0–3	Akademik Svishtov (III)	Isperih
15:00 UTC+3		Report	Ivanov 74', 90'; Petrov 87'	Stadium: Gradski stadion Referee: Dzhenk Tashdemir (Razgrad)

== Round of 32 ==
The draw for this stage was conducted on 23 September 2026. The participants were the 18 preliminary round winners and the 14 First League teams. The games were played between 16 and 19 October 2026.

16 October 2026	Neftochimic (III)	0–4	CSKA 1948 (I)	Burgas
15:00 UTC+3		Report	Hoffmann 6'; Iliev 7', 45'; Sobrero 30'	Stadium: Stadion Lazur; Referee: Dimo Dimov (Sliven)

16 October 2026	Yantra (II)	0–2	Lokomotiv Plovdiv (I)	Gabrovo
19:00 UTC+3		Report	Longville 37'; Burban 55'	Stadium: Stadion Hristo Botev; Referee: Georgi Spasov (Sofia)

17 October 2026	Vihren (II)	1–2	Lokomotiv Sofia (I)	Sandanski
12:00 UTC+3	Katsarov 29' (o.g.)	Report	Dost 56'; Bidounga 78'	Stadium: Stadion Spartak; Referee: Vasil Minev (Sofia)

17 October 2026	Lokomotiv Gorna Oryahovitsa (II)	2–1 (a.e.t.)	Septemvri Sofia (I)	Gorna Oryahovitsa
15:00 UTC+3	Georgiev 86'; Romanyuk 94'	Report	Dobrev 23'	Stadium: Stadion Lokomotiv; Referee: Hristiyana Guteva (Sofia)

17 October 2026	Rilski Sportist (II)	2–3	Dunav Ruse (I)	Samokov
15:00 UTC+3	Chilikov 51', 90+3'	Report	Valiño 31'; Saint-Louis 36'; Dilchovski 76'	Stadium: Stadion Iskar; Referee: Gero Piskov (Sofia)

17 October 2026	Pirin Blagoevgrad (II)	1–4	Hebar (II)	Blagoevgrad
15:00 UTC+3	Kokalkov 31'	Report	Vangelov 28', 90+1'; Cabo 60'; Roemer 86'	Stadium: Stadion Hristo Botev; Referee: Bozhidar Todorov (Sofia)

17 October 2026	Akademik Svishtov (III)	0–3	Slavia Sofia (I)	Svishtov
15:00 UTC+3		Report	Baldé 4', 59'; Semedo 20'	Stadium: Stadion Akademik; Referee: Georgi Novachev (Dobrich)

17 October 2026	Marek (II)	0–3	Cherno More (I)	Dupnitsa
15:00 UTC+3		Report	Bounaas 18'; Lazarov 67'; Ventsislavov 81'	Stadium: Stadion Bonchuk; Referee: Ivo Ivanov (Sofia)

17 October 2026	Beroe (II)	0–3	Ludogorets (I)	Stara Zagora
18:00 UTC+3		Report	Chochev 67' (pen.); Caio Vidal 69'; Rwan Cruz 73'	Stadium: Stadion Beroe; Referee: Georgi Stoyanov (Plovdiv)

18 October 2026	Chernomorets Burgas (II)	0–4	Botev Plovdiv (I)	Burgas
12:00 UTC+3		Report	Chandarov 24'; Salido 51'; Araújo 70'; Meotti 79'	Stadium: Stadion Lazur; Referee: Kristian Todorov (Varna)

18 October 2026	Nesebar (II)	0–2	CSKA Sofia (I)	Nesebar
15:00 UTC+3		Report	Pittas 88' (pen.); Brahimi 90+6'	Stadium: Stadion Nesebar; Referee: Nikola Popov (Sofia)

18 October 2026	Fratria Varna (II)	1–2	Botev Vratsa (I)	Varna
15:00 UTC+3	Kandoussi 45'	Report	Dimitrov 37'; Petkov 77'	Stadium: Stadion Spartak; Referee: Kristina Georgieva (Sofia)

18 October 2026	Spartak Plovdiv (III)	1–2	Arda (I)	Plovdiv
15:00 UTC+3	Aytov 54'	Report	Traoré 34'; S. Ivanov 69'	Stadium: Stadion Todor Diev; Referee: Ventsislav Mitrev (Sofia)

18 October 2026	Spartak Pleven (II)	0–2	Levski Sofia (I)	Lovech (Note: Spartak Pleven will play their Round of 32 home match at the Gradski stadion, Lovech, instead of their regular stadium, Stadion Pleven in Pleven.)
18:00 UTC+3		Report	Everton 57' (pen.); Soula 80'	Stadium: Gradski stadion Referee: Stanimir Trenchev (Sofia)

19 October 2026	Dobrudzha (II)	2–1	Montana (II)	Dobrich
18:00 UTC+3	Souda 59'; Prindzhev 84'	Report	Atanasov 83'	Stadium: Stadion Druzhba; Referee: Petar Nikolov (Sofia)

19 October 2026	Etar (II)	2–4	Spartak Varna (I)	Veliko Tarnovo
19:00 UTC+3	Aleksandrov 23'; Nikolov 29'	Report	Lopes 65'; Okoh 69', 86'; Gomes 90+4'	Stadium: Stadion Ivaylo; Referee: Lyubomir Vushovski (Sofia)

== Round of 16 ==
The draw for this stage was conducted on 29 October 2026. The participants are the 16 Round of 32 winners. The games will be played between 11 and 15 December 2026.

11 December 2026	Arda (I)	v	Hebar (II)	Kardzhali
18:00 UTC+2				Stadium: Arena Arda

12 December 2026	Dunav Ruse (I)	v	Lokomotiv Sofia (I)	Ruse
13:30 UTC+2				Stadium: Gradski stadion

12 December 2026	Cherno More (I)	v	Lokomotiv Plovdiv (I)	Varna
16:30 UTC+2				Stadium: Stadion Ticha

13 December 2026	Spartak Varna (I)	v	Dobrudzha (II)	Varna
12:00 UTC+2				Stadium: Stadion Spartak

13 December 2026	CSKA 1948 (I)	v	Botev Vratsa (I)	Bistritsa
15:00 UTC+2				Stadium: Stadion Bistritsa

13 December 2026	Lokomotiv Gorna Oryahovitsa (II)	v	Botev Plovdiv (I)	Gorna Oryahovitsa
18:00 UTC+2				Stadium: Stadion Lokomotiv

14 December 2026	Slavia Sofia (I)	v	CSKA Sofia (I)	Sofia
18:00 UTC+2				Stadium: Stadion Aleksandar Shalamanov

15 December 2026	Levski Sofia (I)	v	Ludogorets (I)	Sofia
18:00 UTC+2				Stadium: Stadion Georgi Asparuhov

== Quarter-finals ==
The draw was conducted on 29 October 2026, together with the Round of 16 draw. The participants will be the 8 winners from the previous round. The games will be played in March 2027.

March 2027	Cherno More or Lokomotiv Plovdiv	v	Slavia Sofia or CSKA Sofia	Varna or Plovdiv
--:-- UTC+2				Stadium: TBD

March 2027	Lokomotiv GO or Botev Plovdiv	v	Levski Sofia or Ludogorets	Gorna Oryahovitsa or Plovdiv
--:-- UTC+2				Stadium: TBD

March 2027	CSKA 1948 or Botev Vratsa	v	Arda or Hebar	Bistritsa or Vratsa
--:-- UTC+2				Stadium: TBD

March 2027	Spartak Varna or Dobrudzha	v	Dunav Ruse or Lokomotiv Sofia	Varna or Dobrich
--:-- UTC+2				Stadium: TBD
