= Viktorio Valkov =

Bulgarian association football player

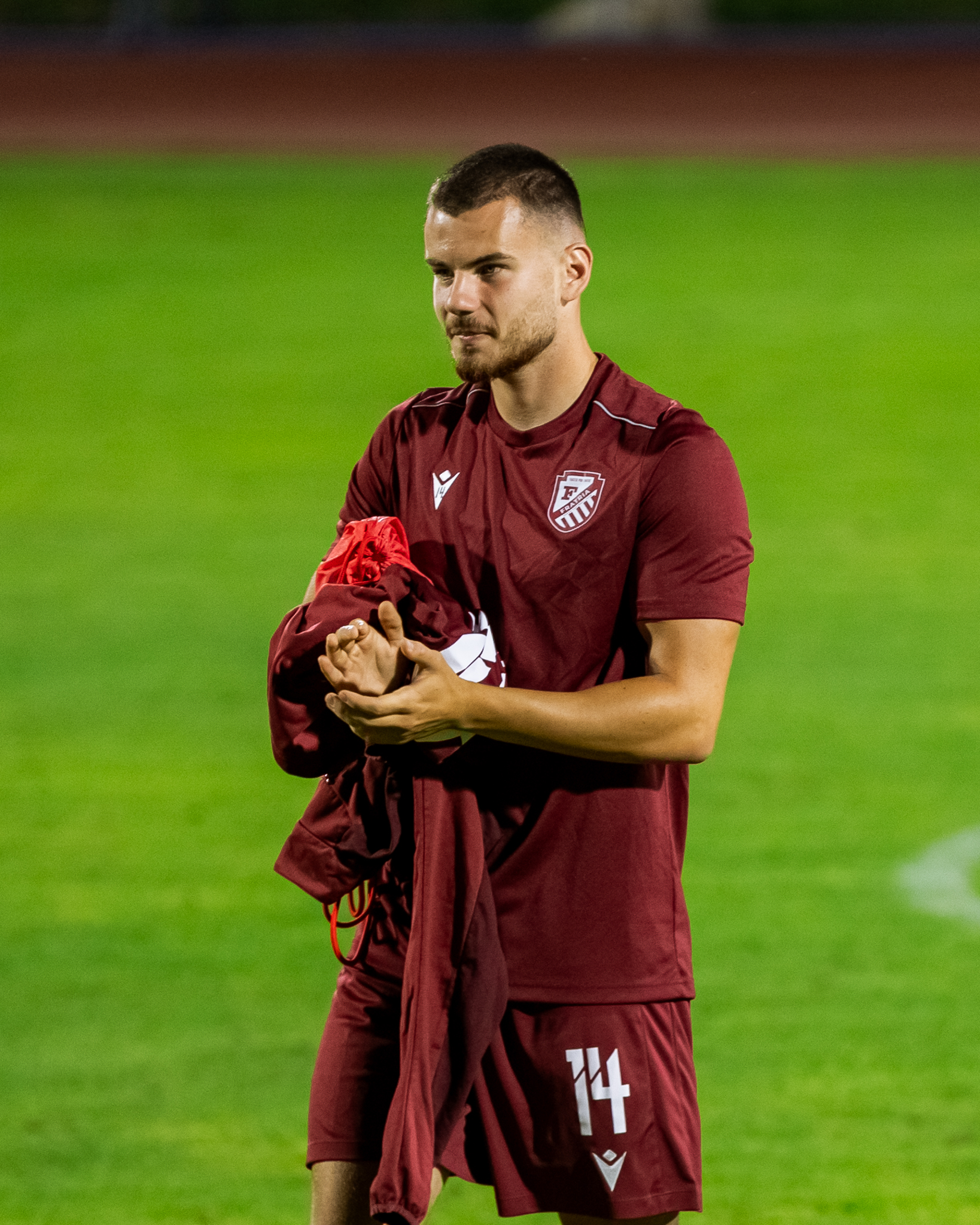

Personal information
- Full name: Viktorio Todorov Valkov
- Date of birth: 26 May 2006 (age 20)
- Place of birth: Sliven, Bulgaria
- Height: 1.82 m (6 ft 0 in)
- Position: Defender

Team information
- Current team: Fratria
- Number: 14

Youth career
- –2022: Sinite Kamani 2013
- 2022: CSKA Sofia
- 2023–2024: Beroe

Senior career*
Years	Team	Apps	(Gls)
2023–2024	Beroe II	19	(0)
2023–2026	Beroe	38	(0)
2026–	Fratria	8	(1)

International career
2022–2023	Bulgaria U17	7	(3)
- * Club domestic league appearances and goals as of 07:33, 20 November 2026 (UTC)

Viktorio Valkov (Bulgarian: Викторио Вълков; born 26 May 2006) is a Bulgarian professional footballer who plays as a defender for Fratria.

== Career ==
Born in Sliven, Valkov started his youth career in the local Sinite Kamani 2013, before moving to CSKA Sofia in 2022. In January 2023 he moved to Beroe, signing his first professional contract. He was regular starter for the team, before an injury ruled him out in October 2024. He returned in play in May 2026, but in October 2025 he was once again injured for long period. On 3 August 2026 his contract with Beroe was ended due to unpaid wages. 2 days later he was announced as the new signing for Fratria.

== Career statistics ==
=== Club ===
As of 23 December 2025

Club performance			League		Cup		Continental		Other		Total	
Club	League	Season	Apps	Goals	Apps	Goals	Apps	Goals	Apps	Goals	Apps	Goals
Bulgaria			League		Bulgarian Cup		Europe		Other		Total	
Beroe II	Third League	2022–23	18	0	–		–		–		18	0
Beroe II	Third League	2023–24	1	0	–		–		–		1	0
Beroe II	Total		19	0	0	0	0	0	0	0	19	0
Beroe	First League	2023–24	18	0	2	0	–		–		20	0
Beroe	First League	2024–25	10	0	0	0	–		–		10	0
Beroe	First League	2025–26	10	0	0	0	–		–		10	0
Beroe	Total		38	0	2	0	0	0	0	0	40	0
FC Fratria	Second League	2026–27	0	0	0	0	–		–		0	0
Career statistics			57	0	2	0	0	0	0	0	59	0
