= David Mihalev =

Bulgarian footballer (born 2006)

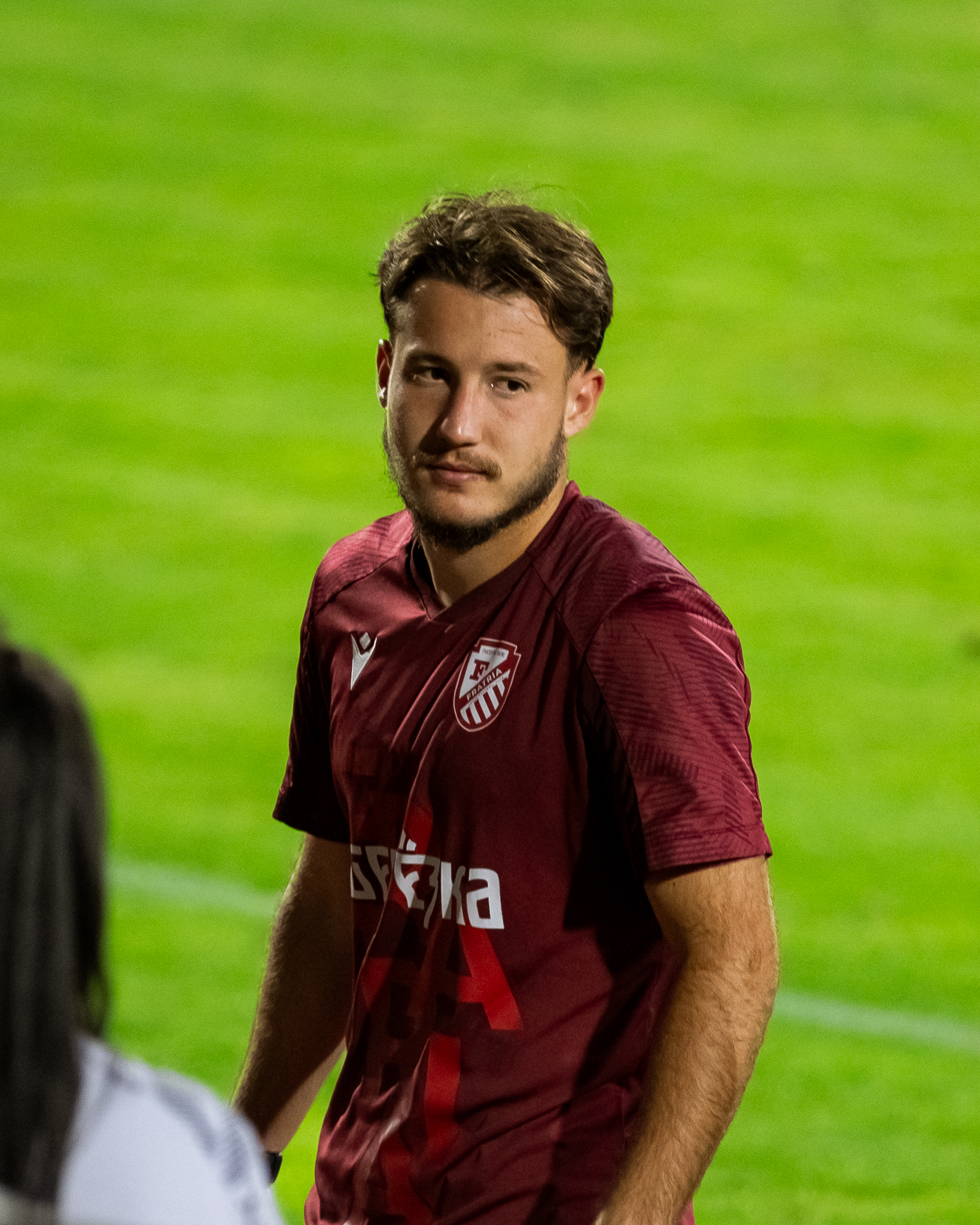

Personal information
- Full name: David Marianov Mihalev
- Date of birth: 27 March 2006 (age 20)
- Place of birth: Stara Zagora, Bulgaria
- Position: Defender

Team information
- Current team: Fratria
- Number: 18

Youth career
- Beroe Stara Zagora
- –2024: Levski Sofia

Senior career*
Years	Team	Apps	(Gls)
2022–2025	Levski II	64	(3)
2023–2025	Levski Sofia	4	(0)
2025	Lokomotiv GO	8	(0)
2026	Sevlievo	11	(0)
2026–	Fratria	9	(0)

International career
2021	Bulgaria U15	4	(0)
2021	Bulgaria U16	2	(0)
2024	Bulgaria U19	7	(0)
- * Club domestic league appearances and goals as of 07:34, 20 November 2026 (UTC)

David Mihalev (Bulgarian: Дейвид Михалев; born 27 March 2006) is a Bulgarian footballer who plays as a defender for Fratria.

== Career ==
Born in Stara Zagora, Mihalev started his youth career in the local Beroe Academy, before moving to Levski Sofia. He made his professional debut for Levski on 21 May 2023 in a league match against Lokomotiv Plovdiv. On 3 June he played one half for the team in the league match against Ludogorets Razgrad. In July 2025 he left Levski and moved to the Second League team Lokomotiv GO. In January 2026 he moved to Sevlievo. On 17 June 2026, Mihalev moved to the fellow Second league team Fratria.

== Career statistics ==
=== Club ===
As of 23 December 2025

Club performance			League		Cup		Continental		Other		Total	
Club	League	Season	Apps	Goals	Apps	Goals	Apps	Goals	Apps	Goals	Apps	Goals
Bulgaria			League		Bulgarian Cup		Europe		Other		Total	
Levski II	Third League	2022–23	16	1	–		–		–		16	1
Levski II	Third League	2023–24	26	1	–		–		–		26	1
Levski II	Third League	2024–25	22	1	–		–		–		22	1
Levski II	Total		64	3	0	0	0	0	0	0	64	3
Levski Sofia	First League	2022–23	2	0	0	0	0	0	–		2	0
Levski Sofia	First League	2023–24	2	0	1	0	0	0	–		3	0
Levski Sofia	First League	2024–25	0	0	0	0	0	0	–		0	0
Levski Sofia	Total		4	0	1	0	0	0	0	0	5	0
Lokomotiv Gorna Oryahovitsa	Second League	2025–26	8	0	0	0	–		–		8	0
Sevlievo	Second League	2025–26	11	0	0	0	–		–		11	0
Fratria	Second League	2026–27	0	0	0	0	–		–		0	0
Career statistics			87	3	1	0	0	0	0	0	88	3
