= Rosen Stefanov =

Bulgarian footballer

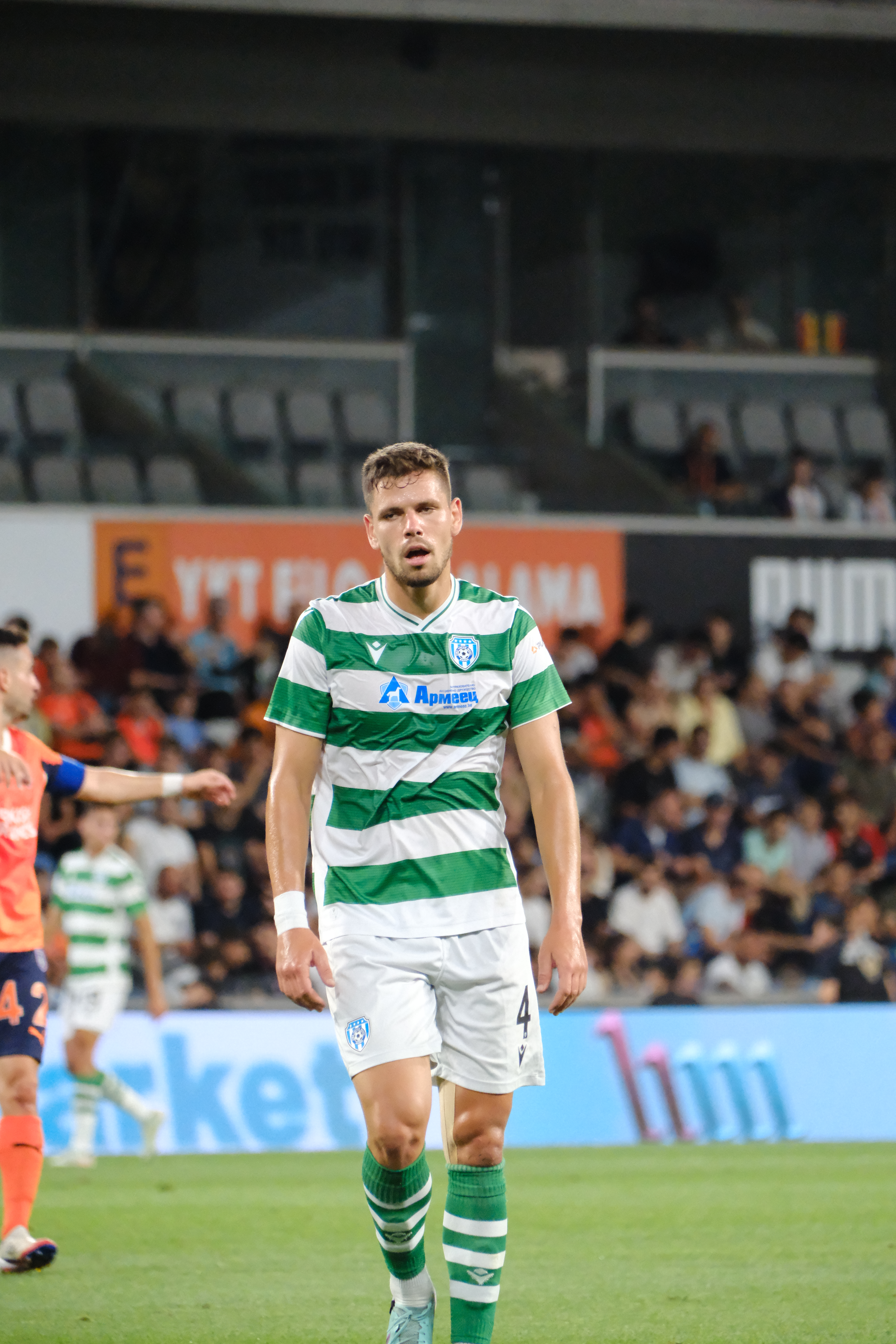

Personal information
- Full name: Rosen Svetlinov Stefanov
- Date of birth: 10 October 2002 (age 24)
- Place of birth: Silistra, Bulgaria
- Height: 1.85 m (6 ft 1 in)
- Position: Centre-back

Team information
- Current team: Fratria
- Number: 44

Youth career
- 2010–2012: Dorostol Silistra
- 2012–2021: Cherno More

Senior career*
| Years | Team | Apps | (Gls) |
| 2021–2026 | Cherno More | 47 | (0) |
| 2022–2024 | → Cherno More II | 8 | (0) |
| 2026– | Fratria | 15 | (1) |

International career
| 2022–2023 | Bulgaria U21 | 5 | (0) |
- * Club domestic league appearances and goals as of 07:37, 20 November 2026 (UTC)

Rosen Stefanov (Bulgarian: Росен Стефанов; born 10 October 2002) is a Bulgarian professional footballer who plays as a centre-back for Second League club Fratria.

== Career ==
Born in Silistra, Stefanov began playing football for local club Dorostol, before joined Cherno More at the age of ten. Having come up through Cherno More's academy, in July 2021 he signed his first professional contract with the club.

Stefanov made his first-team debut on 4 April 2022 against Botev Vratsa. In August 2023, he extended his contract for two more years, until 2025. On 17 June 2026 it was announced his contract is ending and it will not be resigned, leaving the club after 14 years.

On 22 June 2026 he was announced at Fratria, signing a contract for 2 years.

== Career statistics ==
=== Club ===
As of 8 September 2026

| Club | League | Season | League | | Cup | | Continental | | Other | | Total | |
| Club | League | Season | Apps | Goals | Apps | Goals | Apps | Goals | Apps | Goals | Apps | Goals |
|---|---|---|---|---|---|---|---|---|---|---|---|---|
| Cherno More | First League | 2021–22 | 1 | 0 | 0 | 0 | — | | — | | 1 | 0 |
| Cherno More | First League | 2022–23 | 8 | 0 | 0 | 0 | — | | — | | 8 | 0 |
| Cherno More | First League | 2023–24 | 7 | 0 | 0 | 0 | — | | — | | 7 | 0 |
| Cherno More | First League | 2024–25 | 12 | 0 | 3 | 0 | 0 | 0 | — | | 15 | 0 |
| Cherno More | First League | 2025–26 | 19 | 0 | 1 | 0 | 1 | 0 | — | | 21 | 0 |
| Cherno More | Total | | 47 | 0 | 3 | 0 | 1 | 0 | 0 | 0 | 52 | 0 |
| Fratria | Second League | 2026–27 | 8 | 1 | 0 | 0 | — | | — | | 8 | 1 |
| Career statistics | | | 55 | 1 | 4 | 0 | 1 | 0 | 0 | 0 | 60 | 1 |
