= Vasil Andoni (footballer) =

Bulgarian footballer

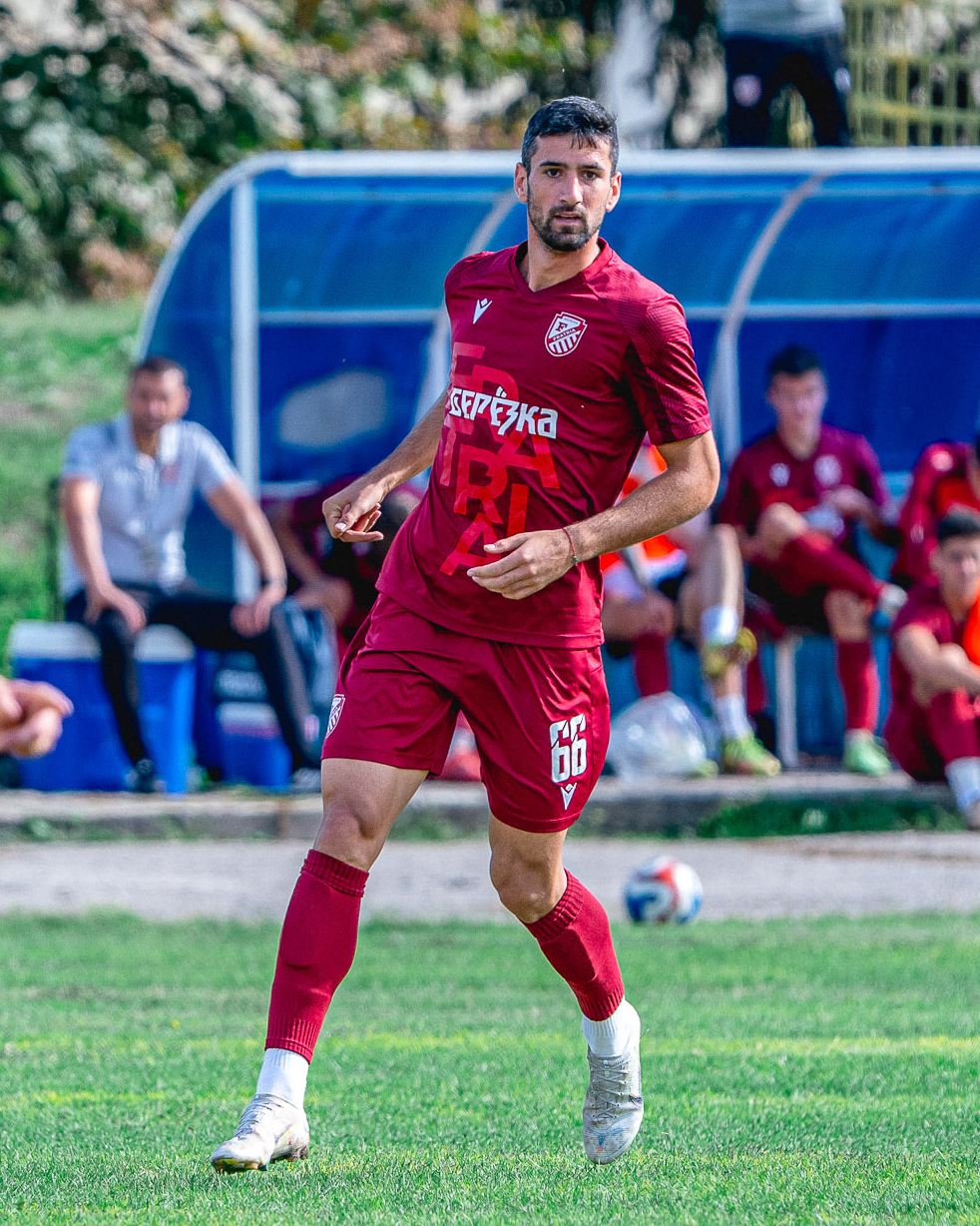
- Andoni playing for Fratria in 2024.

Personal information
- Full name: Vasil Vasiliev Andoni
- Date of birth: 22 June 2000 (age 26)
- Place of birth: Varna, Bulgaria
- Height: 1.88 m (6 ft 2 in)
- Position: Forward

Team information
- Current team: Melfi
- Number: 9

Youth career
- –2017: Kaliakra Kavarna
- 2017–2019: Chernomorets Balchik

Senior career*
Years	Team	Apps	(Gls)
2019–2021	SV der Bosnier	4	(1)
2021–2022	FG Seckbach	7	(1)
2022	Dinamo-Auto Tiraspol	3	(0)
2022–2024	Fratria	44	(32)
2025	Drava Ptuj	7	(0)
2025–2026	Glinik Gorlice	27	(16)
2026–	Melfi	1	(0)
- * Club domestic league appearances and goals as of 13:53, 8 September 2026 (UTC)

Vasil Andoni (Bulgarian: Васил Андони; born 22 June 2000) is a Bulgarian professional footballer who plays as a forward for the Italian Serie D team Melfi.

== Career ==
Born in Varna, Bulgaria in a Moldovan family, Andoni spend his youth career in Kaliakra Kavarna and Chernomorets Balchik, before moving to Germany and spending a half season in Dinamo-Auto Tiraspol. He was on trials to join Dunav Ruse in the summer of 2022. Instead, he joined Fratria Varna, a newly established team playing in A Regional Varna, the 4th level of Bulgarian football. He became a top goalscorer of the team and helped his team promoted to Third League. The next season he again becomes top goalscorer of the team, together with Denys Vasin, helping his team to promote to Second Professional League. On 17 December 2024, he announced he was leaving the club after two-and-a-half years by mutual agreement.

After a short stint at Slovenian club Drava Ptuj, Andoni joined Polish fifth tier club Glinik Gorlice on 8 August 2025.

== International career ==
Andoni holds both Bulgarian and Moldovan citizenship. In an interview in 2023, he expressed a desire to represent the Moldova national team.

== Career statistics ==
As of match played 14 June 2026

Appearances and goals by club, season and competition
Club	Season	League			National cup (Note: Includes Moldovan Cup, Bulgarian Cup)		Continental		Other		Total	
Club	Season	Division	Apps	Goals	Apps	Goals	Apps	Goals	Apps	Goals	Apps	Goals
Dinamo-Auto Tiraspol	2021–22	Moldovan Super Liga	3	0	2	0	—		—		5	0
Fratria	2022–23	A Regional Varna	16	19	0	0	—		—		16	19
Fratria	2023–24	Third League	20	13	1	0	—		—		20	13
Fratria	2024–25	Second League	9	0	2	1	—		—		11	1
Fratria	Total		44	32	3	1	—		—		47	33
Drava Ptuj	2024–25	Slovenian Second League	7	0	—		—		—		7	0
Glinik Gorlice	2025–26	IV liga Lesser Poland	27	16	—		—		—		27	16
Career total			81	48	5	1	0	0	—		86	49

== Honours ==
Fratria

- Cup of Bulgarian Amateur Football League: 2024
