= Galin Grigorov =

Bulgarian footballer

Personal information
- Full name: Galin Veselinov Grigorov
- Date of birth: 31 October 2003 (age 22)
- Place of birth: Varna, Bulgaria
- Height: 1.87 m (6 ft 2 in)
- Position: Goalkeeper

Team information
- Current team: Fratria

Youth career
- Cherno More

Senior career*
Years	Team	Apps	(Gls)
2021–2024	Cherno More	0	(0)
2022–2024	Cherno More II	23	(0)
2023–2024	→ Chernomorets Balchik (loan)	18	(0)
2024–2026	Dobrudzha Dobrich	57	(0)
2026–	Fratria	0	(0)
- * Club domestic league appearances and goals as of 2 March 2026 (UTC) ‡ National team caps and goals as of 08:26, 22 November 2023 (UTC)

Galin Grigorov (Bulgarian: Галин Григоров; born 21 October 2003) is a Bulgarian footballer who plays as a goalkeeper for Fratria.

== Career ==
Born in Varna, Grigorov started his career in the local Cherno More Academy. He signed his first professional contract with the team on 3 March 2022. In June 2023 he was send on loan to Chernomorets Balchik until end of season. On 17 June 2024, after his good season with Chernomorets, he moved permenently to Dobrudzha Dobrich. He become first choice goalkeeper in the promotion season of Dobrudzha and first choice in their season in First League. He left the team on 7 August 2026 for unpaid wages.

On 10 September 2026, he signed with Fratria.

== Career statistics ==
=== Club ===
As of 26 May 2026

Club performance			League		Cup		Continental		Other		Total	
Club	League	Season	Apps	Goals	Apps	Goals	Apps	Goals	Apps	Goals	Apps	Goals
Bulgaria			League		Bulgarian Cup		Europe		Other		Total	
Cherno More	First League	2021–22	0	0	0	0	–		–		0	0
Cherno More	First League	2022–23	0	0	0	0	–		–		0	0
Cherno More	Total		0	0	0	0	0	0	0	0	0	0
Cherno More II	Third League	2022–23	23	0	–		–		–		23	0
Chernomorets Balchik (loan)	Second League	2023–24	18	0	1	0	–		–		19	0
Dobrudzha Dobrich	Second League	2024–25	25	0	0	0	–		–		25	0
Dobrudzha Dobrich	First League	2025–26	32	0	0	0	–		–		32	0
Dobrudzha Dobrich	Total		57	0	0	0	0	0	0	0	57	0
Fratria	Second League	2026–27	0	0	0	0	–		–		0	0
Career statistics			98	0	1	0	0	0	0	0	99	0
