= Diego Gutiérrez (footballer, born 2000) =

Spanish footballer

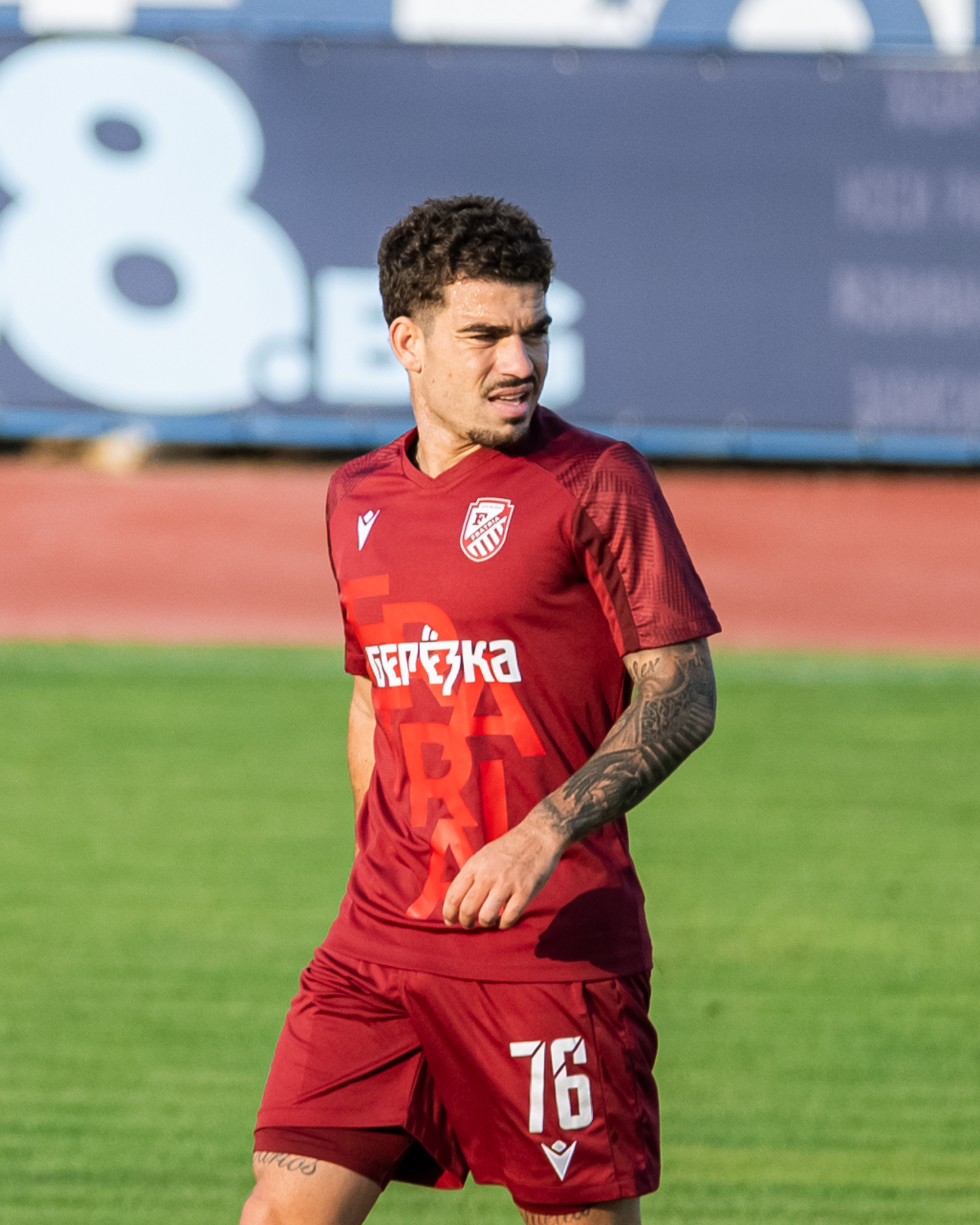

Personal information
- Full name: Diego Gutiérrez Chinea
- Date of birth: 3 September 2000 (age 26)
- Place of birth: Adeje, Spain
- Height: 1.71 m (5 ft 7 in)
- Position: Midfielder

Team information
- Current team: Fratria
- Number: 76

Youth career
- Marino
- 2018–2019: Albacete

Senior career*
Years	Team	Apps	(Gls)
2017–2018	Marino	?	(1)
2019–2020	Marino	25	(1)
2020–2021	Las Palmas C	5	(0)
2020–2023	Las Palmas B	58	(2)
2020–2023	Las Palmas	2	(0)
2023–2024	San Roque de Lepe	33	(1)
2024–2025	Atlético Paso	31	(0)
2025–2026	Cacereño	24	(1)
2026–	Fratria	13	(1)
- * Club domestic league appearances and goals as of 07:38, 20 November 2026 (UTC)

Diego Gutiérrez Chinea (born 3 September 2000) is a Spanish professional footballer who plays as a central midfielder for Bulgarian Second League club Fratria.

== Club career ==
Gutiérrez was born in Adeje, Santa Cruz de Tenerife, Canary Islands, and made his senior debut with Tercera División side CD Marino during the 2017–18 campaign. On 25 July 2018, he joined Albacete Balompié and returned to the youth setup.

On 30 August 2019, Martínez returned to Marino, and immediately became a regular starter for the club. On 5 October 2020, he signed for UD Las Palmas, being initially assigned to the C-team also in the fourth division.

Martínez made his first team debut for Las Palmas on 17 December 2020, coming on as a second-half substitute for Kirian Rodríguez in a 4–0 away win against CD Varea, for the season's Copa del Rey. His Segunda División debut occurred the following 20 May, as he replaced fellow youth graduate Fabio González in a 0–1 away loss against Sporting Gijón.

On 30 June 2026 he was announced as the newest signing of Bulgarian club Fratria, marking his first team outside Spain.
