= Arhan Isuf =

Bulgarian footballer

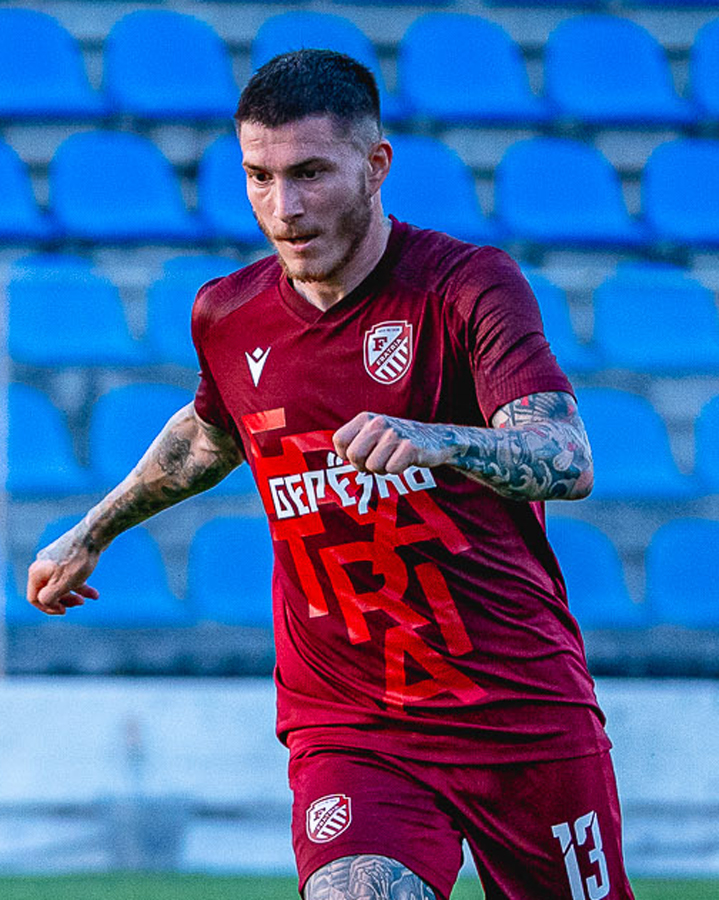
- Isuf playing for Fratria in 2025.

Personal information
- Full name: Arhan Gyunay Isuf
- Date of birth: 25 January 1999 (age 27)
- Place of birth: Plovdiv, Bulgaria
- Position: Defender

Team information
- Current team: Fratria
- Number: 13

Youth career
- –2017: Lokomotiv Plovdiv

Senior career*
Years	Team	Apps	(Gls)
2015–2020	Lokomotiv Plovdiv	6	(0)
2018–2019	→ Arda Kardzhali (loan)	18	(0)
2019–2020	→ Spartak Varna (loan)	15	(0)
2020–2021	Pirin Blagoevgrad	26	(0)
2021–2022	Spartak Varna	31	(5)
2022	CSKA 1948 II	15	(0)
2023–2024	Hebar Pazardzhik	39	(0)
2024	Tirana	10	(0)
2025	Krumovgrad	12	(0)
2025–	Fratria	43	(1)

International career
2017–2018	Bulgaria U19	6	(0)
- * Club domestic league appearances and goals as of 11:53, 31 October 2026 (UTC)

Arhan Isuf (Bulgarian: Архан Исуф; born 25 January 1999) is a Bulgarian professional footballer who plays as a defender for Fratria.

== Career ==
=== Lokomotiv Plovdiv ===
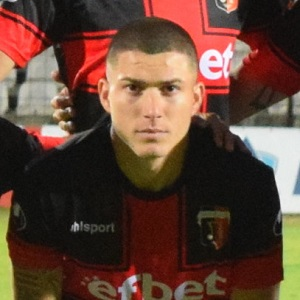
Isuf while playing for Lokomotiv Plovdiv in 2019.

On 17 May 2015 Isuf was set on bench in the league match against Marek Dupnitsa, but stayed as unused substitute. He completed his professional debut on 26 November 2017 in a league match against CSKA Sofia. Two days later he signed his first professional contract with Lokomotiv until June 2020.

==== Loan to Arda ====
On 8 June 2018 Isuf was sent on loan to the Second League team Arda Kardzhali for the 2018–19 season.

=== Krumovgrad ===
In January 2025, he signed a contract with Krumovgrad.

== Career statistics ==
=== Club ===
As of 25 April 2018

Club performance			League		Cup		Continental		Other		Total	
Club	League	Season	Apps	Goals	Apps	Goals	Apps	Goals	Apps	Goals	Apps	Goals
Lokomotiv Plovdiv	First League	2017–18	5	0	0	0	–		–		5	0
Arda (loan)	Second League	2018–19	18	0	1	0	–		–		19	0
Lokomotiv Plovdiv	First League	2019–20	0	0	0	0	0	0	0	0	0	0
Career statistics			23	0	1	0	0	0	0	0	24	0
