= Kristiyan Peshov =

Bulgarian footballer

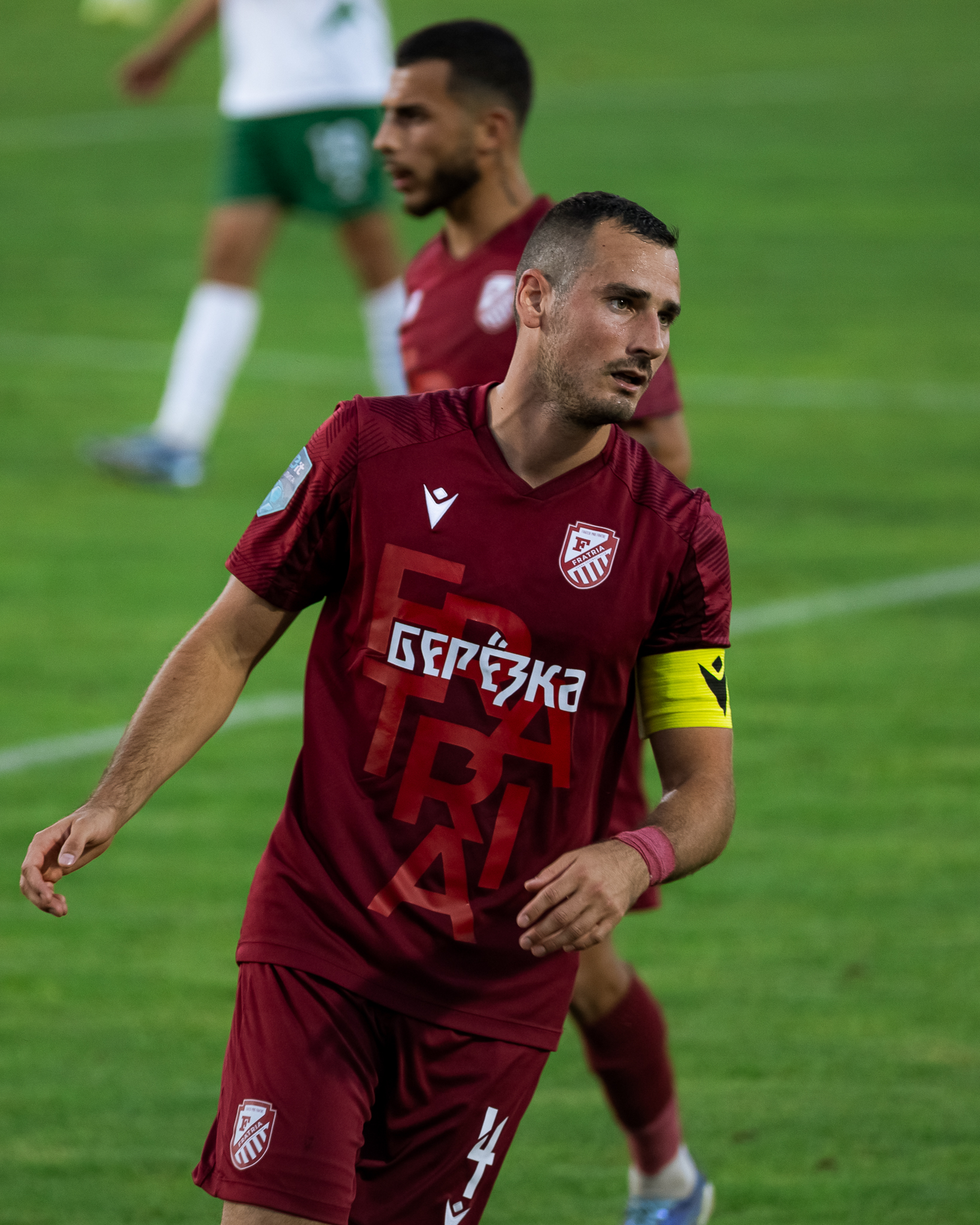

Personal information
- Full name: Kristiyan Petrov Peshov
- Date of birth: 16 June 1997 (age 29)
- Place of birth: Sofia, Bulgaria
- Height: 1.78 m (5 ft 10 in)
- Position: Midfielder

Team information
- Current team: Fratria
- Number: 4

Youth career
- 2006–2016: CSKA Sofia

Senior career*
Years	Team	Apps	(Gls)
2016–2018	Sozopol	56	(13)
2018–2019	Slavia Sofia	12	(0)
2019	→ CSKA 1948 (loan)	0	(0)
2019–2020	CSKA 1948	3	(0)
2020–2023	Septemvri Sofia	80	(11)
2023–2025	Lokomotiv Plovdiv	34	(1)
2025	Botev Vratsa	0	(0)
2026–	Fratria	28	(1)
- * Club domestic league appearances and goals as of 07:30, 20 November 2026 (UTC)

Kristiyan Peshov (Bulgarian: Кристиян Пешов; born 16 June 1997) is a Bulgarian professional footballer who plays as a midfielder for Fratria.

== Career ==
Peshov joined CSKA Sofia's youth team set up aged 9, and captained the Under-19 side, but left the club after his last game for CSKA's academy.

In June 2016, Peshov signed first professional contract with Second League side Sozopol.

In June 2018, Peshov signed with Slavia Sofia as a free agent. In June 2023, he joined Lokomotiv Plovdiv on a two-year deal.
