= Velislav Boev =

Bulgarian footballer

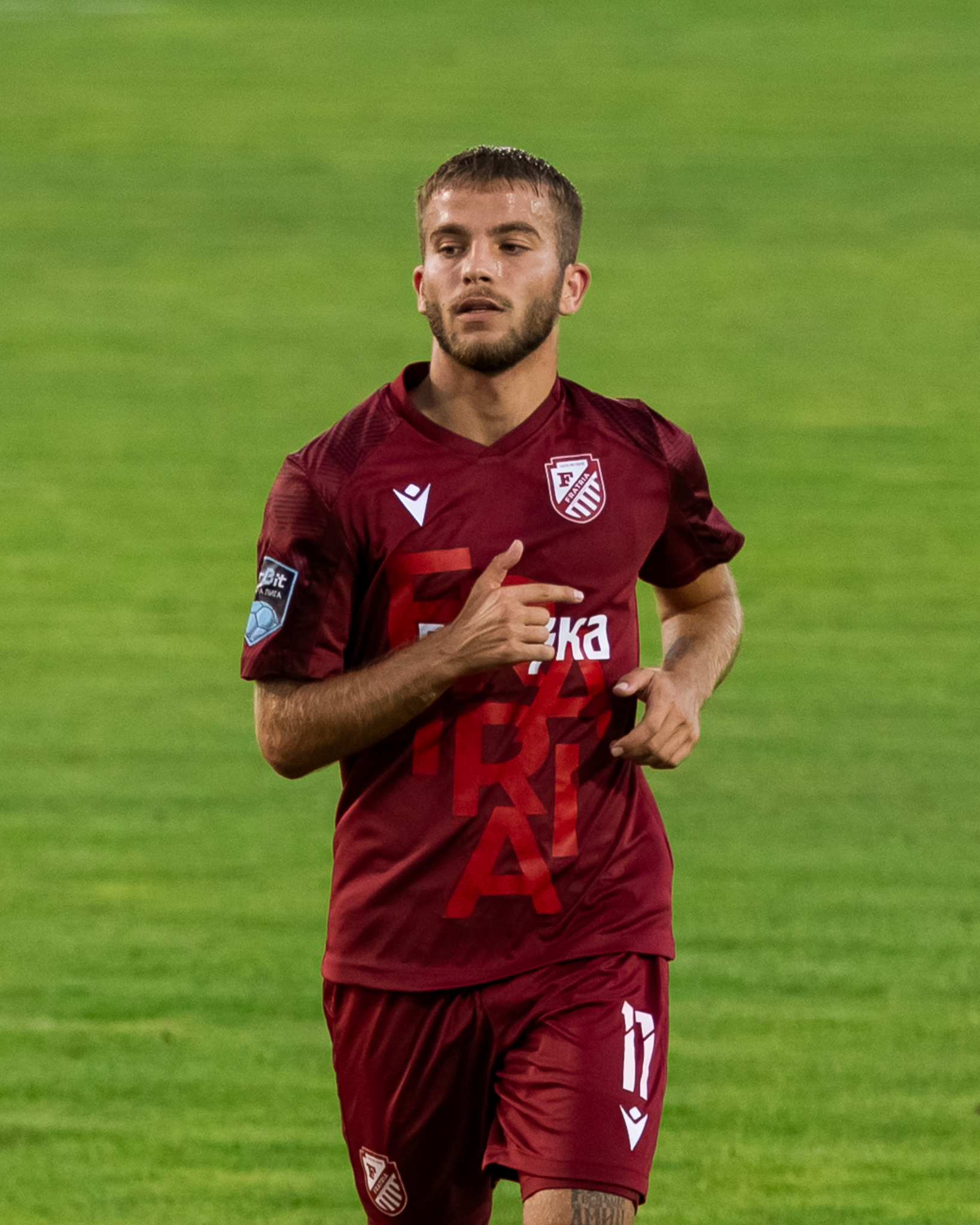

Personal information
- Full name: Velislav Petrov Boev
- Date of birth: 19 December 2003 (age 22)
- Place of birth: Varna, Bulgaria
- Height: 1.66 m (5 ft 5 in)
- Position: Left-back

Team information
- Current team: Fratria
- Number: 11

Youth career
- Spartak Varna
- Botev Plovdiv
- Ludogorets Razgrad

Senior career*
Years	Team	Apps	(Gls)
2019–2022	Spartak Varna	65	(2)
2023–2024	Spartak Varna	25	(0)
2024–2025	Dobrudzha Dobrich	26	(1)
2025–2026	Yantra Gabrovo	32	(1)
2026–	Fratria	12	(0)

International career
2020–2021	Bulgaria U19	7	(0)
2022	Bulgaria U21	2	(0)
- * Club domestic league appearances and goals as of 07:24, 10 November 2026 (UTC)

Velislav Boev (Bulgarian: Велислав Боев; born 19 December 2003) is a Bulgarian footballer who plays as a defender for Fratria.

== Career ==
Boev is a youth player of Spartak Varna, before moving to Botev Plovdiv and later Ludogorets Razgrad academies and rejoined Spartak to join the first team in 2019 at age 15 years 11 months 18 days. On 11 July 2022 he completed his First League debut in a match against Slavia Sofia. He left Spartak in December 2022, but after spending 6 months without club, in June 2023 he returned to the club.

== International career ==
In September 2022 he received his first call up for Bulgaria U21 for the friendly matches against Hungary U21 and Serbia U21 on 23 and 27 September.

== Career statistics ==
=== Club ===
As of 23 July 2022

Club performance			League		Cup		Continental		Other		Total	
Club	League	Season	Apps	Goals	Apps	Goals	Apps	Goals	Apps	Goals	Apps	Goals
Bulgaria			League		Bulgarian Cup		Europe		Other (Note: Includes Bulgarian Supercup matches.)		Total	
Spartak Varna	Second League	2019–20	1	0	0	0	–		–		1	0
Spartak Varna	Third League	2020–21	21	1	1	0	–		–		22	1
Spartak Varna	Second League	2021–22	32	1	1	0	–		–		33	1
Spartak Varna	First League	2022–23	5	0	0	0	–		–		5	0
Spartak Varna	Total		59	2	2	0	0	0	0	0	61	2
Career statistics			59	2	2	0	0	0	0	0	61	2
