= Georgi Trifonov =

Bulgarian footballer (born 2002)

Personal information
- Full name: Georgi Nikolaev Trifonov
- Date of birth: 13 February 2002 (age 24)
- Place of birth: Asenovgrad, Bulgaria
- Height: 1.83 m (6 ft 0 in)
- Position: Forward

Team information
- Current team: Fratria (on loan from Spartak Varna)

Youth career
- Asenovets
- Botev Plovdiv

Senior career*
Years	Team	Apps	(Gls)
2020–2022	Botev Plovdiv	4	(0)
2021–2022	Botev II	20	(1)
2022–2023	Krumovgrad	17	(0)
2023–2026	Maritsa Plovdiv	99	(31)
2026	Dobrudzha Dobrich	17	(3)
2026–	Spartak Varna	5	(0)
2026–	→ Fratria (loan)	6	(4)

International career
2017	Bulgaria U16	4	(0)
2018	Bulgaria U17	5	(0)
2021	Bulgaria U19	2	(2)
- * Club domestic league appearances and goals as of 07:37, 20 November 2026 (UTC)

Georgi Trifonov (Bulgarian: Георги Трифонов; born 13 February 2002) is a Bulgarian professional footballer who plays as a forward for Second League club Fratria on loan from Spartak Varna.

== Career ==
Born in Asenovgrad, Trifonov started his career at the local Asenovets academy, before joining Botev Plovdiv.

After three years with Maritsa, he signed with First League team Dobrudzha on 20 January 2026. On 8 July 2026, after Dobrudzha's relegation, he signed with Spartak Varna. On 8 September 2026 he was send on loan to Fratria until end of season.
