= FC Fratria =

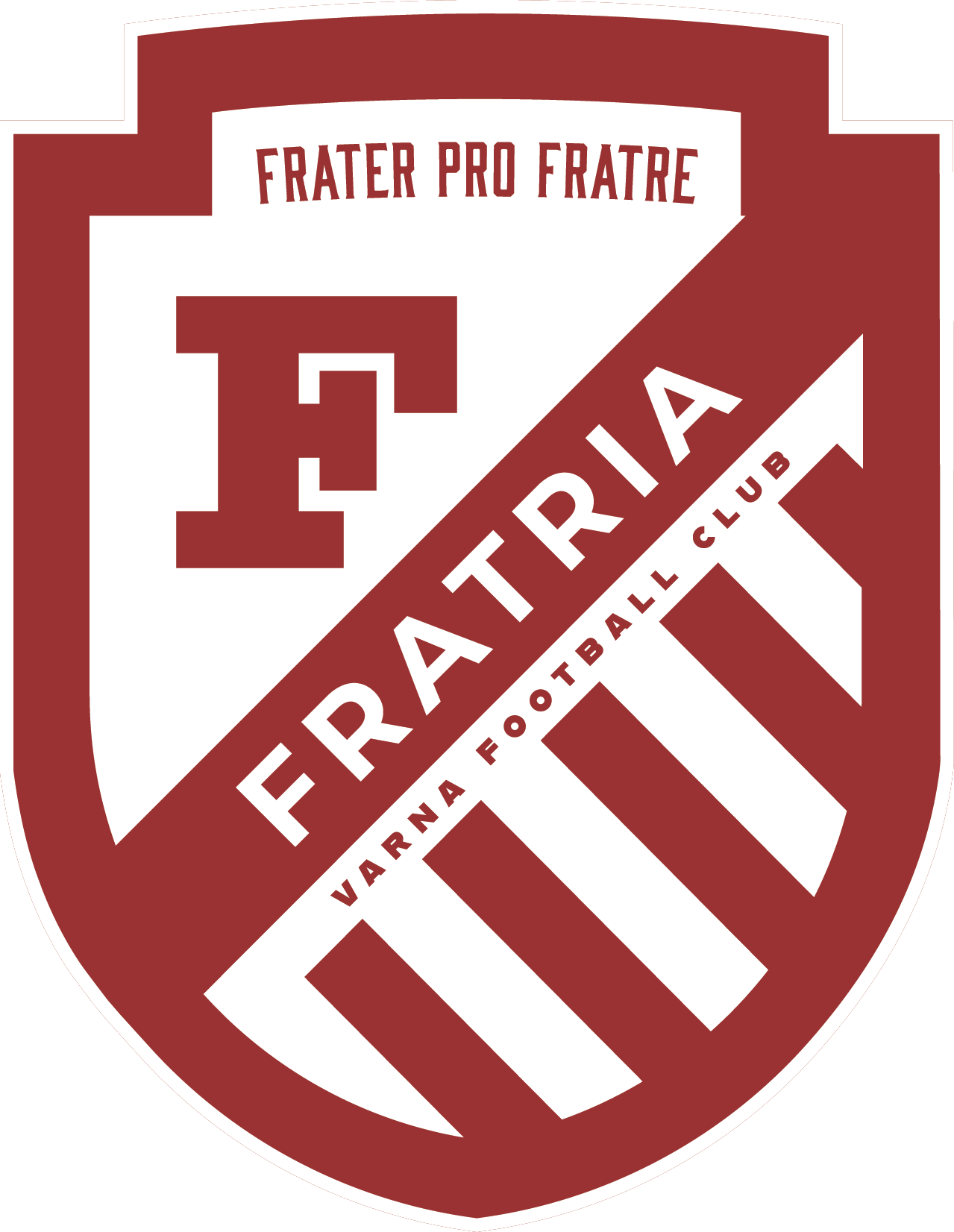
- Full name: Футболен Клуб Фратрия Варна; Fratria Varna Football Club
- Nickname: Братството (The Brotherhood)
- Founded: 16 April 2021; 5 years ago
- Ground: Spartak Stadium, Varna
- Capacity: 7,000
- Chairman: Viktor Bakurevich
- Manager: Renārs Rode
- League: Second League
- 2025–26: Second League, 3rd of 17
- Website: fcfratria.com
Home colours	Away colours

FC Fratria (Bulgarian: ФК Фратрия) is a Bulgarian association football club based in Varna, which currently competes in the Second League, the second level of Bulgarian football league system. Fratria's home ground is the Dimitar Vatev Stadium in Beloslav, which is under construction, until then, they play on Spartak Stadium, which has a capacity of 7,000 spectators.

== History ==
=== Establishment ===
Fratria was established in 2021 by businessman Viktor Bakurevich, owner of Berezka supermarkets, together with Evgeniy Gashchuk. They decided to start an academy that is free from taxes, making the club base in Benkovski, Varna Province, after their sons both trained in the same academy and they started to look how they can help youth football in Bulgaria. Later that year, the team started a partnership with MFC Ticha Academy.

=== Regional and amateur leagues climb up: 2021–2024 ===
They won their first season in B Regional Group and in 2022 were promoted to A Regional Group with Oleksandr Babych taking the manager position. Since Bakurevich had Russian and Ukrainian roots, a few players from Russia and Ukraine, living in Bulgaria, joined the main team and the academies. The team won the league and on 29 May 2023, Fratria secured promotion to Third League, being called the fastest developing team, not only because of their quick promotion to the third league, but also because of the development of their base and academy. In June 2023, the team started to prepare for their first season in Third League with the intentions to win the group. Fratria also established a second team that joined A Regional League. Later same month it was announced they will move to Stadium Albena 1 in Albena resort.

In their first cup appearance, Fratria was drawn against local team Spartak Varna, but lost the match with a 1:3 result, played on 8 September 2023. On 5 October 2023 the team announced that they are introducing a new sporting director in the name of Emanuel Lukanov, who took the position. In January 2024, Fratria announced they will have a friendly match against Farul II, as part of their winter camp, setting a start of a partnership with Farul Constanța. On 5 February Babych was signed by Pirin Blagoevgrad in First League and Lukanov was promoted as a manager of the team. On 29 February 2024 the team once again changed stadium, moving to Kavarna Stadium, which would allow the team to play in Second League. They won the Cup of Bulgarian Amateur Football League, beating Akademik Svishtov on Ivaylo Stadium on 22 May 2024 with 2:0.

=== Professional league breakthrough: 2024–present ===
On 1 June 2024 Fratria won their match against Ustrem Donchevo, finishing second, with the same points as Ludogorets III and were promoted to Second League. The team also returned to Albena 1 Stadium, due to administrative issues with Kavarna Stadium. They won the preliminary round of the Bulgarian Cup against Botev Novi Pazar to face Beroe Stara Zagora in the round of 32. The match, played on 14 November 2024, ended 3-3 on regular time, with Beroe later winning on penalties. Few hours after the result, despite the positive play of the team and being close to eliminate the team from First League, Lukanov was sacked. Later the same day, the sport director Vasil Petrov, was promoted as manager of the team. In January 2025, the team invested in renovation of Dimitar Vatev Stadium in Beloslav, signing a contract to play their home matches at the stadium after the summer. Few days after the season end, on 28 May 2025, Vasil Petrov was announced to step down from the post and return as Sporting Director. Alexei Savinov was appointed as head coach of the team, a day later. On 2 September 2025, Spartak Varna announced they made a deal with Fratria and they would move to Spartak Stadium. On 3 October 2025, they announced they had signed a contract for 30 years to use Dimitar Vatev Stadium, which will be completely reconstructed. The team finished the 2025/26 season on third place, just a point behind second place and missed the chance to play on the promotion playoff.

== Honours ==
- A RFG Varna:
  - Winners (1): 2022–23
- B RFG Varna:
  - Winners (1): 2021–22
- Cup of Bulgarian Amateur Football League:
  - Winners (1): 2023–24

== Logo, shirt and sponsor ==
The "Fratria" name of the club translates to „Brotherhood", from Latin, with the team having the slogan “frater pro fratre", meaning „brother for brother", on their logo. Their main colors are red (bordo) and black. Since 2021 their main sponsor is Berezka.

Period	Kit manufacturer	Shirt partner
2021–2023	(Bulgaria) Misho Sport	Berezka
2023–2024	(Germany) Saller	Berezka
2024–	(Italy) Macron	Berezka

== Players ==
=== Current squad ===
As of 31 October 2026

Note: Flags indicate national team as defined under FIFA eligibility rules; some limited exceptions apply. Players may hold more than one non-FIFA nationality.

No.	Pos.	Nation	Player
1	GK	BUL	Galin Grigorov
4	DF	BUL	Kristiyan Peshov
6	MF	BUL	Aleksandar Tsvetkov
7	FW	BUL	Denislav Aleksandrov
8	MF	BUL	Rumen Rumenov
9	FW	BUL	Denislav Angelov
10	MF	UKR	Tymur Korablin
11	DF	BUL	Velislav Boev
12	GK	BUL	Stanislav Tanev
13	DF	BUL	Arhan Isuf
14	DF	BUL	Viktorio Valkov
15	FW	BUL	Miroslav Marinov
17	MF	ESP	Bilal Kandoussi

No.	Pos.	Nation	Player
18	DF	BUL	David Mihalev
20	MF	BUL	Aleksandar Bozhilov
21	MF	BUL	Iliyan Kapitanov (captain)
22	MF	BUL	Georgi Atanasov
23	MF	BUL	Stanislav Dyulgerov
44	DF	BUL	Rosen Stefanov
45	FW	BUL	Georgi Trifonov (on loan from Spartak Varna)
69	GK	BUL	Iliyan Iliev
71	DF	BUL	Ibryam Ibryam
76	MF	ESP	Diego Gutiérrez
90	DF	MDA	Vadim Dijinari
99	FW	UKR	Vladyslav Vakula

For recent transfers, see Transfers summer 2026.

=== Out on loan ===
Note: Flags indicate national team as defined under FIFA eligibility rules; some limited exceptions apply. Players may hold more than one non-FIFA nationality.

No.	Pos.	Nation	Player

=== Foreign players ===
Up to five non-EU nationals can be registered and given a squad number for the first team in the Bulgarian First Professional League however only three can be used in a match day. Those non-EU nationals with European ancestry can claim citizenship from the nation their ancestors came from. If a player does not have European ancestry he can claim Bulgarian citizenship after playing in Bulgaria for 5 years.

EU Nationals

- (Spain) Diego Gutiérrez

EU Nationals (Dual citizenship)

- (Moldova) (Romania) Vadim Dijinari
- (Spain) (Morocco) Bilal Kandoussi

Non-EU Nationals

- (Ukraine) Tymur Korablin
- (Ukraine) Vladyslav Ukrainskyi

== Notable players ==
Had international caps for their respective countries, held any club record, or had more than 100 league appearances. Players whose name is listed in bold represented their countries.

Bulgaria

- (Bulgaria) **Denislav Aleksandrov**
- (Bulgaria) **Georgi Kitanov**
- (Bulgaria) **Georgi Lazarov**
- (Bulgaria) Miroslav Marinov
- (Bulgaria) **Aleksandar Tsvetkov**

Europe

- (Armenia) **Artur Daniyelyan**
- (Moldova) Vasil Andoni
- (Ukraine) Denys Vasin

Africa

- (Central African Republic) **Mike Bettinger**

Concacaf

- (British Virgin Islands) **Momchil Yordanov**

== Personnel ==
=== Club officials ===
Position	Name	Nationality
Coaching staff
Head coach	Renārs Rode	(Latvia)
Assistant coach	Yevhen Lutsenko	(Ukraine)
Assistant coach	Yura Podolchuk	(Ukraine)
Assistant coach	Ender Örenç	(Turkey)
Goalkeepers coach	Oleksandr Lavrentsov	(Ukraine)
Conditioning coach	Atanas Stefanov	(Bulgaria)
Fitness coach	Oleksiy Dovhyi	(Ukraine)
Doctor	Hryhoriy Makarov	(Ukraine)
Administrator	Evgeni Nikolaev	(Bulgaria)
Administrator	Artur Napilov	(Ukraine)
Management
Chairman	Viktor Bakurevich	(Russia) (Bulgaria)
Sports director	Denys Vasin	(Ukraine)
Technical director	Tsvetan Ivanov	(Bulgaria)
Academy director	Viktor Ulyanytskyi	(Ukraine)

=== Managerial history ===
Dates	Name	Honours
2021–2022	(Bulgaria) Ivaylo Stanchev	
2022–2024	(Ukraine) Oleksandr Babych	
2024	(Bulgaria) Emanuel Lukanov	
2024–2025	(Bulgaria) Vasil Petrov	
2025–2026	(Moldova) Alexei Savinov	
2026	(Ukraine) Yevhen Lutsenko (caretaker)	
2026–	(Latvia) Renārs Rode	

== Seasons ==
=== Detailed season history ===
Results of league and cup competitions by season
Season	League											Bulgarian Cup	Other competitions		Top goalscorer	
Season	Division	Level	P	W	D	L	F	A	GD	Pts	Pos	Bulgarian Cup	Other competitions		Top goalscorer	
2021–22	B Regional Varna	5	10	9	0	1	29	8	+21	27	1st ↑	DNE				
2022–23	A Regional Varna	4	18	15	2	1	55	10	+45	47	1st ↑	DNQ	Cup of AFL	R1	(Moldova) **Vasil Andoni**	**19**
2023–24	Third League	3	26	19	4	3	71	20	+51	61	2nd ↑	Preliminary	Cup of AFL	W	(Moldova) Vasil Andoni (Ukraine) Denys Vasin	13
2024–25	Second League	2	38	13	9	16	45	40	-5	48	14th	Round of 32			(Bulgaria) Georgi Lazarov	9
2025–26	Second League	2	32	18	9	5	61	29	+32	63	3rd	Round of 32			(Bulgaria) Miroslav Marinov	14
2026–27	Second League	2										Round of 32				

== Goalscoring and appearance records ==
As of 18 November 2026

**Most league appearances for the club**

Rank	Name	Career	Appearances
1	(Bulgaria) Denis Kadir	2023–2026	83
2	(Bulgaria) **Ibryam Ibryam**	2023–present	81
3	(Bulgaria) **Iliyan Kapitanov**	2024–present	66
—	(Bulgaria) Aleksandar Angelov	2024–2026	66
5	(Bulgaria) Martin Kostadinov	2023–2026	53
6	(Bulgaria) Vasil Dobrev	2023–2025	51
7	(Netherlands) Xavello Druiventak	2024–2026	50
8	(Bulgaria) **Miroslav Marinov**	2025–present	46
—	(Moldova) Igor Mostovei	2024–2026	46
10	(Moldova) Vasil Andoni	2022–2024	44

**Most league goals for the club**

Rank	Name	Career	Goals
1	(Moldova) Vasil Andoni	2022–2024	32
2	(Bulgaria) **Miroslav Marinov**	2025–present	16
3	(Netherlands) Xavello Druiventak	2024–2026	15
—	(Bulgaria) Denis Kadir	2023–2026	15
—	(Ukraine) Danylo Polonskyi	2022–2024	15
6	(Ukraine) Denys Vasin	2023–2024	13
7	(Ukraine) Andriy Lisak	2022–2025	12
8	(Bulgaria) **Iliyan Kapitanov**	2024–present	11
9	(Bulgaria) **Denislav Angelov**	2024–2025; 2026–present	10
10	(Bulgaria) Georgi Lazarov	2024–2025	9

- Players in **bold** are still playing for Fratria.
