= Vadim Dijinari =

Moldovan footballer (born 1999)

Personal information
- Date of birth: 1 April 1999 (age 27)
- Place of birth: Bender, Moldova
- Height: 1.95 m (6 ft 5 in)
- Position: Centre-back

Team information
- Current team: Fratria
- Number: 90

Youth career
- 2008–2018: Sheriff Tiraspol

Senior career*
Years	Team	Apps	(Gls)
2019–2022	Sheriff Tiraspol	4	(1)
2020–2021	→ Dinamo-Auto (loan)	30	(1)
2021–2022	→ Milsami Orhei (loan)	22	(2)
2022–2024	Milsami Orhei	35	(0)
2024–2025	1599 Șelimbăr	11	(0)
2025	Petrocub Hîncești	11	(0)
2026–	Fratria	14	(2)

International career^{‡}
2017	Moldova U19	3	(0)
2019–2020	Moldova U21	5	(0)
2024	Moldova	0	(0)
- * Club domestic league appearances and goals as of 08:09, 19 November 2026 (UTC) ‡ National team caps and goals as of 21:33, 15 November 2025 (UTC)

Vadim Dijinari (born 1 April 1999) is a Moldovan professional footballer who plays as a centre-back for Bulgarian Second League club Fratria.

== Club career ==
Born in Bender, Moldova, Dijinari spent his entire youth career at Sheriff Tiraspol. In 2019 he made his debut at the first team. He spent a season on loan to Dinamo-Auto and season at Milsami Orhei, before joining on permanent to Milsami in 2022. On 10 November 2024, he signed with Romanian 1599 Șelimbăr. On 7 July 2025, he signed a long-term contract with Petrocub Hîncești, returning in Moldova. He ended his contract with the club on 21 January 2026.

On 24 January he signed with the Bulgarian Second League team Fratria. The manager of the club confirmed, that Fratria had interest to sign him in the summer, but the transfer collapsed.

== International career ==
In March 2024 Dijinari received his first call up for Moldova for the friendly matches against North Macedonia and Cayman Islands on 22 and 26 March 2024, respectively.

== Career statistics ==
As of 26 May 2026

Appearances and goals by club, season and competition
Club	Season	League			Cup		Europe		Other		Total	
Club	Season	Division	Apps	Goals	Apps	Goals	Apps	Goals	Apps	Goals	Apps	Goals
Sheriff Tiraspol	2019	Divizia Națională	4	1	0	0	0	0	—		4	1
Dinamo-Auto (loan)	2020–21	Divizia Națională	30	1	2	1	1	0	—		33	3
Milsami Orhei (loan)	2021–22	Divizia Națională	22	2	3	0	3	0	—		28	2
Milsami Orhei	2022–23	Moldovan Super Liga	12	0	1	1	4	0	—		17	1
Milsami Orhei	2023–24	Moldovan Super Liga	19	0	2	0	0	0	—		21	0
Milsami Orhei	2024–25	Moldovan Super Liga	4	0	0	0	0	0	—		4	0
Milsami Orhei	Total		57	2	6	1	7	0	0	0	70	3
1599 Șelimbăr	2024–25	Liga II	11	0	0	0	0	0	—		11	0
Petrocub Hîncești	2025–26	Moldovan Super Liga	11	0	1	0	0	0	—		12	0
Fratria	2025–26	Bulgarian Second League	10	2	0	0	—		—		10	2
Career total			123	6	9	2	7	0	0	0	139	8
