= Vladimir Aytov =

Bulgarian footballer

Personal information
- Full name: Vladimir Georgiev Aytov
- Date of birth: 12 April 1996 (age 30)
- Place of birth: Plovdiv, Bulgaria
- Height: 1.81 m (5 ft 11 in)
- Positions: Defender; midfielder

Team information
- Current team: Spartak Plovdiv
- Number: 11

Youth career
- Maritsa Plovdiv
- Botev Plovdiv

Senior career*
Years	Team	Apps	(Gls)
2012–2015	Botev Plovdiv	10	(0)
2013	→ Rakovski (loan)	7	(0)
2016	Dobrudzha Dobrich	13	(2)
2016–2017	Oborishte	26	(8)
2017–2023	Montana	141	(16)
2023	Bdin Vidin	19	(0)
2023–	Spartak Plovdiv	32	(3)

International career
2012–2013	Bulgaria U17	4	(1)
2017	Bulgaria U21	1	(1)
- * Club domestic league appearances and goals as of 10:03, 1 November 2024 (UTC)

Vladimir Aytov (Bulgarian: Владимир Айтов, born 12 April 1996) is a Bulgarian professional footballer who plays as a defender for Spartak Plovdiv.

== Club career ==
=== Early career ===
Aytov was loaned to Rakovski, playing in the B Group during 2013–14 season.

=== Botev Plovdiv ===
Aytov made his A Group debut on 27 June 2014. He was included in the starting lineup for a 1–1 draw against Beroe Stara Zagora. On 30 October 2015, Aytov was included in the starting lineup of Botev Plovdiv for the first time in his career but his team was defeated with 2–0 by Slavia Sofia.

In January 2016 Aytov's contract was terminated by mutual agreement and he left Botev Plovdiv.

=== Oborishte ===
After the relegation to Dobrudzha Dobrich, Aytov signed with the other Second League team of Oborishte. He made his debut for the team in the league on 6 August 2016 scoring a goal for the 1:1 draw against Pomorie.

=== Montana ===
On 24 June 2017, Aytov signed a 2-year contract with Montana.

== International career ==
=== Youth levels ===
On 8 June 2017 he made his debut for Bulgaria U21 in a friendly match against Georgia U21 scoring also his debut goal for the 1:0 win.

== Career statistics ==
As of 23 May 2017

Club performance			League		Cup		Continental		Other		Total	
Club	League	Season	Apps	Goals	Apps	Goals	Apps	Goals	Apps	Goals	Apps	Goals
Bulgaria			League		CCB Cup		Europe		Other (Note: Includes Bulgarian Supercup matches.)		Total	
Botev Plovdiv	A Group	2012–13	0	0	0	0	–		–		0	0
Rakovski (loan)	B Group	2013–14	7	0	4	0	–		–		11	0
Botev Plovdiv	A Group	2013–14	0	0	0	0	0	0	–		0	0
Botev Plovdiv	A Group	2014–15	4	0	1	0	0	0	1	0	6	0
Botev Plovdiv	A Group	2015–16	6	0	0	0	–		–		6	0
Botev Plovdiv	Botev Total		10	0	1	0	0	0	1	0	12	0
Dobrudzha Dobrich	B Group	2015–16	13	2	0	0	–		–		13	2
Oborishte	Second League	2016–17	26	8	1	1	–		–		27	9
Career Total			55	10	6	1	0	0	1	0	62	11
