= Yevhen Lutsenko =

Ukrainian footballer (born 1980)

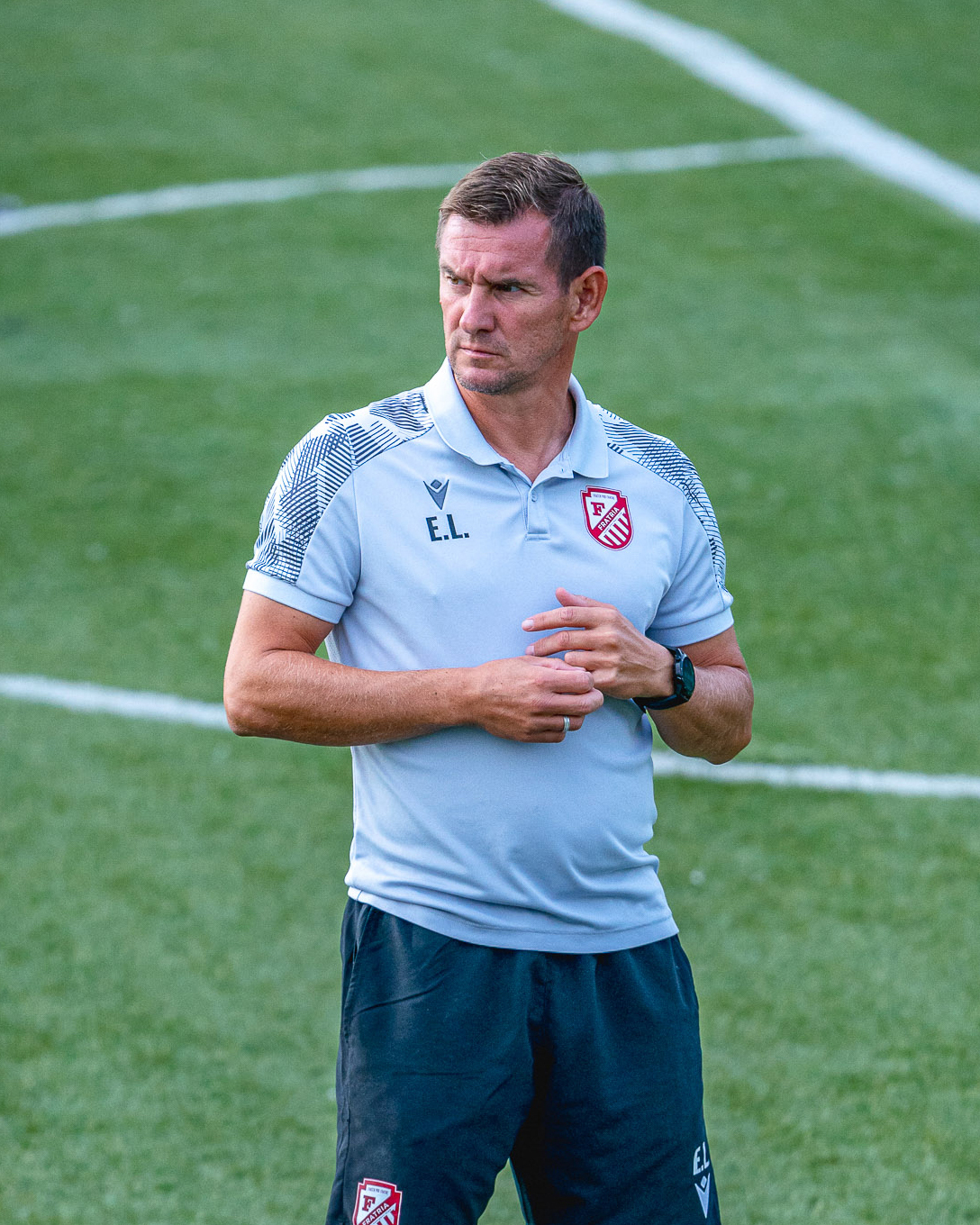
- Lutsenko as coach at Fratria in 2024.

Personal information
- Full name: Yevhen Valentynovych Lutsenko
- Date of birth: 10 November 1980 (age 45)
- Place of birth: Kyiv, Soviet Union (now Ukraine)
- Height: 1.76 m (5 ft 9 in)
- Position: Midfielder

Team information
- Current team: Fratria (assistant)

Youth career
- 1995–1996: Dynamo Kyiv
- 1996–1999: Anderlecht

Senior career*
Years	Team	Apps	(Gls)
1999–2002	Lausanne-Sport	47	(1)
2003	Dynamo Moscow	12	(1)
2004	Shinnik Yaroslavl	10	(0)
2004–2006	Chornomorets Odesa	40	(1)
2007–2008	Zorya Luhansk	6	(0)
2008–2009	Chornomorets Odesa	10	(0)
2009–2011	Tavriya Simferopol	29	(1)
Total		154	(4)

International career
2003–2004	Ukraine	2	(0)

Managerial career
- 2022: FK Jonava (caretaker)
- 2023–2025: Fratria (youth coach)
- 2024–: Fratria (assistant)
- 2026: Fratria (caretaker)
- * Club domestic league appearances and goals

Yevhen Valentynovych Lutsenko (born 10 November 1980) is a Ukrainian former professional footballer who played as a midfielder, and now a manager, currently working in Fratria as youth coach and assistant.

== Club career ==
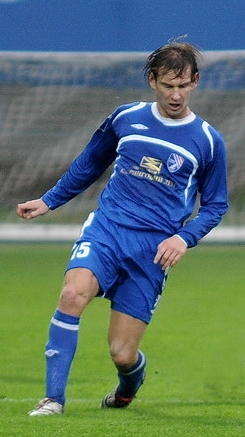
Lutsenko as player in 2009.

Lutsenko began playing in the Dynamo Kyiv football school, before moving to Belgium to continue his training with R.S.C. Anderlecht. In 1999, he moved to the Swiss Super League to play with Lausanne Sports. He helped the team finish second in his first year there. In 2002, with the team relegated, he moved to play in the Russian Premier League with Dynamo Moscow. After a single season there he moved to another Russian club, Shinnik Yaroslav, before returning to Ukraine to join Chornomorets Odesa for the 2004–05 season. The following season he played 21 games and scored 1 goal, helping the team finish third in the league. After another season in Odesa he moved to Zorya Luhansk in the winter transfer window of the 2006–07 season. He returned to Chornomorets Odesa on 8 August 2008.

== International career ==
Lutsenko was capped by the Ukraine national team on two occasions.
