= Aleksandar Bozhilov =

Bulgarian footballer (born 2005)

Personal information
- Full name: Aleksandar Ivaylov Bozhilov
- Date of birth: 23 February 2006 (age 20)
- Place of birth: Sofia, Bulgaria
- Height: 1.80 m (5 ft 11 in)
- Position: Midfielder

Team information
- Current team: Fratria

Youth career
- 2015–2022: Levski Sofia

Senior career*
Years	Team	Apps	(Gls)
2022–2025	Levski Sofia II	87	(9)
2023–2025	Levski Sofia	1	(0)
2025–2026	CSKA III	8	(1)
2025–2026	CSKA II	4	(0)
2026	→ Sportist Svoge (loan)	9	(0)
2026–	Fratria II	3	(1)
2026–	Fratria	0	(0)

International career^{‡}
2022	Bulgaria U17	2	(0)
2024	Bulgaria U18	1	(0)
2024	Bulgaria U19	2	(0)
- * Club domestic league appearances and goals as of 12:08, 31 October 2026 (UTC) ‡ National team caps and goals as of 07:41, 30 March 2026 (UTC)

Aleksandar Bozhilov (Bulgarian: Александър Божилов; born 23 February 2006) is a Bulgarian professional footballer who plays as a midfielder for Fratria.

== Career ==
Bozhilov is born in Sofia, Bulgaria and started his youth career at the local Levski Sofia academy in 2015. He made his professional debut for the first team in a league match against Arda on 11 June 2023.

Bozhilov left Levski to join CSKA Sofia on 23 June 2025, being signed with the second team of the club. On 30 January 2026 he was sent on loan to Sportist Svoge until end of season. On 28 August 2026 he ended his contract with CSKA. On 8 September 2026, the last day of transfer window in Bulgaria, he signed with Fratria.
