= Stanislav Dyulgerov =

Bulgarian footballer (born 2003)

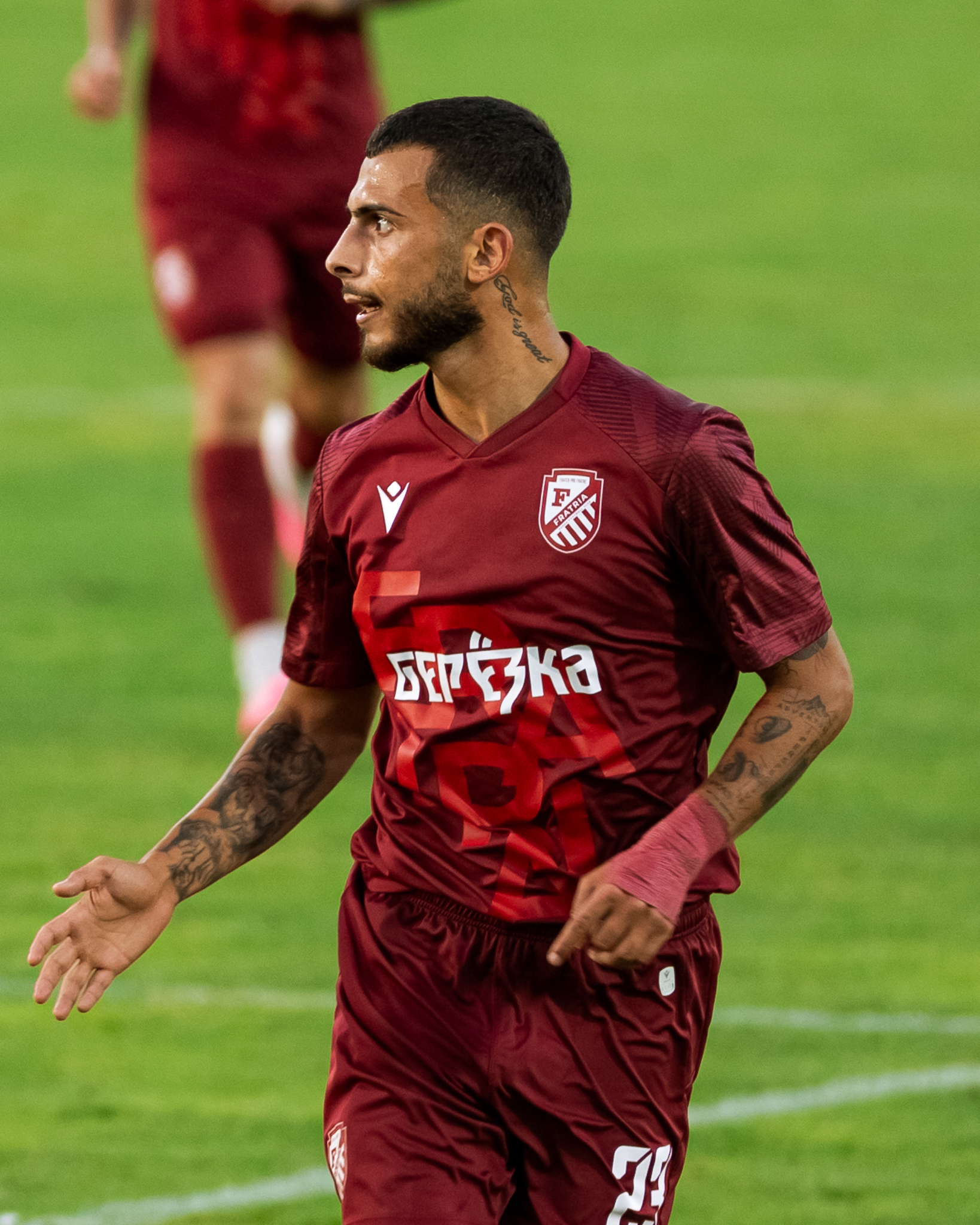

Personal information
- Full name: Stanislav Petkov Dyulgerov
- Date of birth: 23 August 2003 (age 23)
- Place of birth: Burgas, Bulgaria
- Height: 1.71 m (5 ft 7 in)
- Position: Midfielder

Team information
- Current team: Fratria
- Number: 23

Youth career
- –2015: PSFC Chernomorets
- 2015–2016: Arsenal
- 2016–2018: SuS Stadtlohn
- 2018–2022: Twente

Senior career*
Years	Team	Apps	(Gls)
2022–2023	Apollon Larissa	8	(1)
2023–2024	Arda Kardzhali	7	(0)
2024–2026	Yantra Gabrovo	57	(0)
2026–	Fratria	15	(2)

International career^{‡}
2021	Bulgaria U19	2	(0)
2022	Bulgaria U21	3	(0)
- * Club domestic league appearances and goals as of 07:36, 20 November 2026 (UTC) ‡ National team caps and goals as of 07:41, 30 March 2026 (UTC)

Stanislav Dyulgerov (Bulgarian: Станислав Дюлгеров; born 23 August 2003) is a Bulgarian professional footballer who plays as a midfielder for Fratria.

== Career ==
Dyulgerov is born in Burgas, Bulgaria and started his youth career at the local Chernomorets Burgas academy. In 2015 he moved with his family to England and joined Arsenal Academy. He then spend 2 seasons with German SuS Stadtlohn, before joining Twente Academy in 2018. In February 2021 he joined first team trainings. On 25 July 2021 he played for the first team in a friendly match against ADO Den Haag. In the summer of 2022 he moved to Apollon Larissa. On 8 December 2022 he scored his first league goal for the club.

On 7 March 2023 he returned to Bulgaria and signed with the First League team Arda. He made his professional debut for the team in a league match on 14 May 2023 against Lokomotiv Sofia. In June 2024 he moved to Yantra Gabrovo, a second league team. He spend 2 seasons with the team. On 22 July 2026 he moved to Fratria.
