= Miroslav Marinov =

Bulgarian footballer

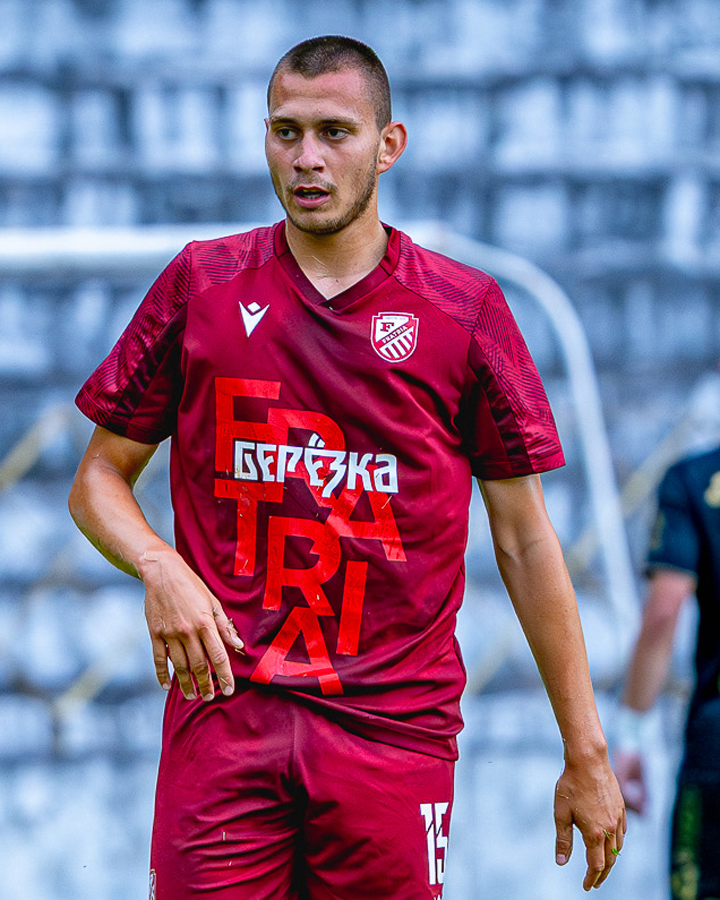
- Marinov playing for Fratria in 2025.

Personal information
- Full name: Miroslav Kalinov Marinov
- Date of birth: 7 March 2004 (age 22)
- Place of birth: Vratsa, Bulgaria
- Height: 1.90 m (6 ft 3 in)
- Position: Second striker

Team information
- Current team: Fratria
- Number: 15

Youth career
- 2012–2018: Botev Vratsa

Senior career*
Years	Team	Apps	(Gls)
2019–2020	Botev Vratsa II	17	(10)
2019–2025	Botev Vratsa	82	(9)
2025–	Fratria	47	(16)

International career^{‡}
2021–2022	Bulgaria U19	9	(0)
2022–2024	Bulgaria U21	2	(0)
- * Club domestic league appearances and goals as of 07:34, 20 November 2026 (UTC) ‡ National team caps and goals as of 09:00, 29 September 2022 (UTC)

Miroslav Kalinov Marinov (Bulgarian: Мирослав Калинов Маринов; born 7 March 2004) is a Bulgarian footballer who plays as a striker for Fratria.

== Club career ==
Born and raised in Vratsa, Marinov started playing football at the age of 8 for the local football club Botev Vratsa. He spent seven years at the clubs' academy before being promoted to the first team at the age of 15. He made his debut in a friendly against PFC Litex Lovech on 3 July 2019. On 22 November 2020, he made his official First League debut, coming in as a substitute for Brazilian Tom against Cherno more Varna, becoming the youngest ever Botev Vratsa player to play in a competitive top division game at 16 years and eight months.

Marinov was assigned to Botev's second team, competing in Third League where he scored seven goals in the opening 13 matches of the 2020–21 season. At the end of 2020, he was voted in the divisions' best 11 by all teams' head coaches. He finished the season with ten goals in 17 games before being promoted full time to the first team.

In August 2021, at 17 years and five months old, he became the youngest player to ever score a goal in the First League for Botev Vratsa after hitting the target in a game against Tsarsko selo.

On 1 July 2025, after his contract with Botev Vratsa ended, he moved to Fratria.

== International career ==
In September 2021, Marinov was called up to the Bulgaria U19 national team for the first time, making his debut in a friendly against Malta. He then appeared in the UEFA U19 Euro 2022 qualifiers against Bosnia-Herzegovina, Montenegro and Republic of Ireland.

== Career statistics ==
=== Club ===
As of 26 May 2026

Club performance			League		Cup		Continental		Other		Total	
Club	League	Season	Apps	Goals	Apps	Goals	Apps	Goals	Apps	Goals	Apps	Goals
Bulgaria			League		Bulgarian Cup		Europe		Other		Total	
Botev Vratsa II	Third League	2020–21	17	10	–		–		–		17	10
Botev Vratsa	First League	2020–21	2	0	2	0	–		–		4	0
Botev Vratsa	First League	2021–22	19	3	1	0	–		–		19	3
Botev Vratsa	First League	2022–23	30	3	0	0	–		–		30	3
Botev Vratsa	First League	2023–24	17	1	0	0	–		–		17	1
Botev Vratsa	First League	2024–25	12	2	3	1	–		–		15	3
Botev Vratsa	Total		82	9	6	1	0	0	0	0	88	10
Fratria	Second League	2025–26	31	14	2	1	–		–		33	15
Fratria	Total		31	14	2	1	0	0	0	0	33	15
Career total			130	33	8	2	0	0	0	0	138	35
