= Oleksandr Lavrentsov =

Ukrainian footballer

Personal information
- Full name: Oleksandr Serhiyovych Lavrentsov
- Date of birth: 15 December 1972 (age 53)
- Place of birth: Izmail, Ukrainian SSR
- Height: 1.88 m (6 ft 2 in)
- Position: Goalkeeper

Team information
- Current team: Fratria (goalkeeping coach)

Youth career
- DYuSSh Izmail
- –1989: UFK Kharkiv

Senior career*
Years	Team	Apps	(Gls)
1993–1994	Dunay Izmail (amateurs)	32	(0)
1995	Sportul Studențesc Chișinău	15	(0)
1995–1996	Veres Rivne	25	(0)
1996–1998	Mykolaiv	81	(0)
1998–2000	Kryvbas Kryvyi Rih	57	(0)
2000–2002	Krylia Sovetov Samara	51	(0)
2003	Torpedo-Metallurg Moscow	9	(0)
2004	Krylia Sovetov Samara	0	(0)
2004–2005	Arsenal Kharkiv	4	(0)
2005–2006	Oryol	49	(0)
2007–2009	Mykolaiv	34	(0)
2010	Dnister Ovidiopol	25	(0)
2011–2013	Odesa	24	(0)
Total		391	(0)

Managerial career
- 2010–2011: Dnister Ovidiopol (goalkeeping coach)
- 2011–2013: Odesa (goalkeeping coach)
- 2013–2017: Chornomorets Odesa (assistant)
- 2017–2020: Mariupol (assistant)
- 2021–2022: Kryvbas Kryvyi Rih (goalkeeping coach)
- 2022–2024: Fratria (goalkeeping coach)
- 2024: Pirin Blagoevgrad (goalkeeping coach)
- 2025–: Fratria (goalkeeping coach)
- * Club domestic league appearances and goals

Oleksandr Serhiyovych Lavrentsov (Ukrainian: Олександр Сергійович Лавренцов; born 15 December 1972) is a retired Ukrainian professional footballer. He currently works in Fratria as a goalkeeping coach.

== Career ==
He played 4 games in the 2002 UEFA Intertoto Cup for FC Krylia Sovetov Samara.

He was called up to Ukraine national football team more than once, but never gained a cap.

== Honours ==
- Ukrainian Premier League bronze: 1999, 2000.
- Most games without goals allowed in a season for FC Krylia Sovetov Samara: 13 (in 2001).
