= Bilal Kandoussi =

Spanish footballer (born 2000)

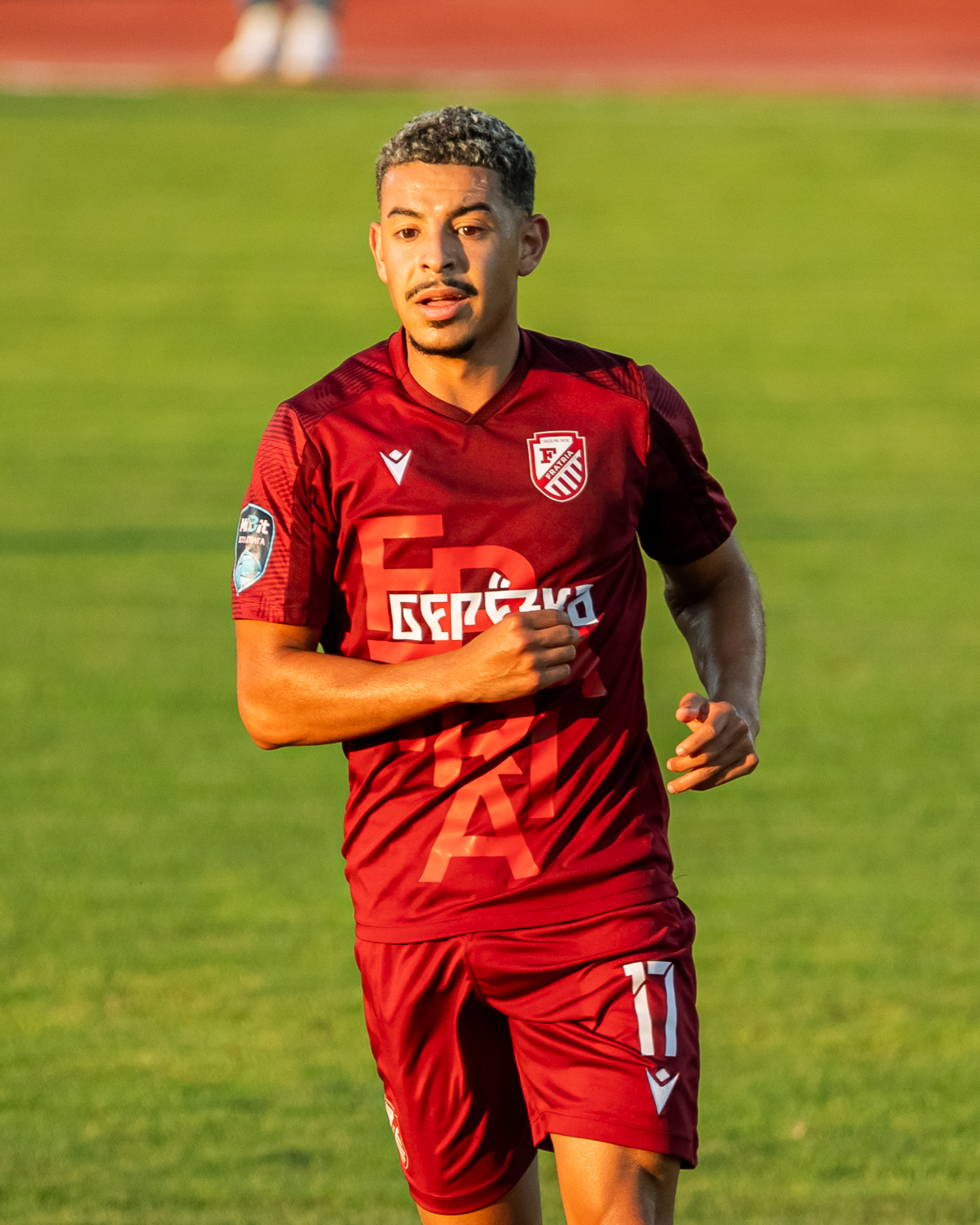

Personal information
- Full name: Bilal Kandoussi El Khallak
- Date of birth: 17 February 2000 (age 26)
- Place of birth: Madrid, Spain
- Height: 1.73 m (5 ft 8 in)
- Positions: Forward; attacking midfielder

Team information
- Current team: Fratria
- Number: 17

Youth career
- –2018: Real Madrid
- 2018–2019: Getafe

Senior career*
| Years | Team | Apps | (Gls) |
| 2019–2021 | Castellón B | 31 | (13) |
| 2019–2023 | Castellón | 40 | (3) |
| 2020–2021 | → SD Logroñés (loan) | 14 | (0) |
| 2023 | → Atlético Baleares (loan) | 5 | (1) |
| 2023–2024 | Badajoz | 11 | (0) |
| 2024–2025 | Peña Deportiva | 18 | (1) |
| 2025 | Rayo Majadahonda | 19 | (3) |
| 2025–2026 | SD Logroñés | 18 | (3) |
| 2026 | Arenteiro | 14 | (1) |
| 2026– | Fratria | 15 | (4) |
- * Club domestic league appearances and goals as of 07:34, 20 November 2026 (UTC)

Bilal Kandoussi (born 17 February 2000) is a Spanish professional footballer who plays as a forward for Fratria.

== Career ==
Born in Madrid, Spain, in a family of Moroccans, he spend his youth in Real Madrid academy, before joining Getafe academy in 2018. In August 2019 he moved to Castellón, signing a contract until 2021. He spend a season loan with SD Logroñés and a half season with Atlético Baleares. On 16 August 2023 his contract was ended after a four years with the club. Later the same month he moved with a permanent transfer to Badajoz. On 27 December 2023 he was injured during a road accident, which ruled him out of play until the summer of 2024.

In August 2024 he moved to Peña Deportiva. On 26 August 2025 he returned in SD Logroñés. In February 2026 he moved to Primera Federación team Arenteiro.

On 24 June 2026 he left Spain for first time in his career and joined the Bulgarian Second League team Fratria.
