= Daniel Halachev =

Bulgarian footballer (born 2005)

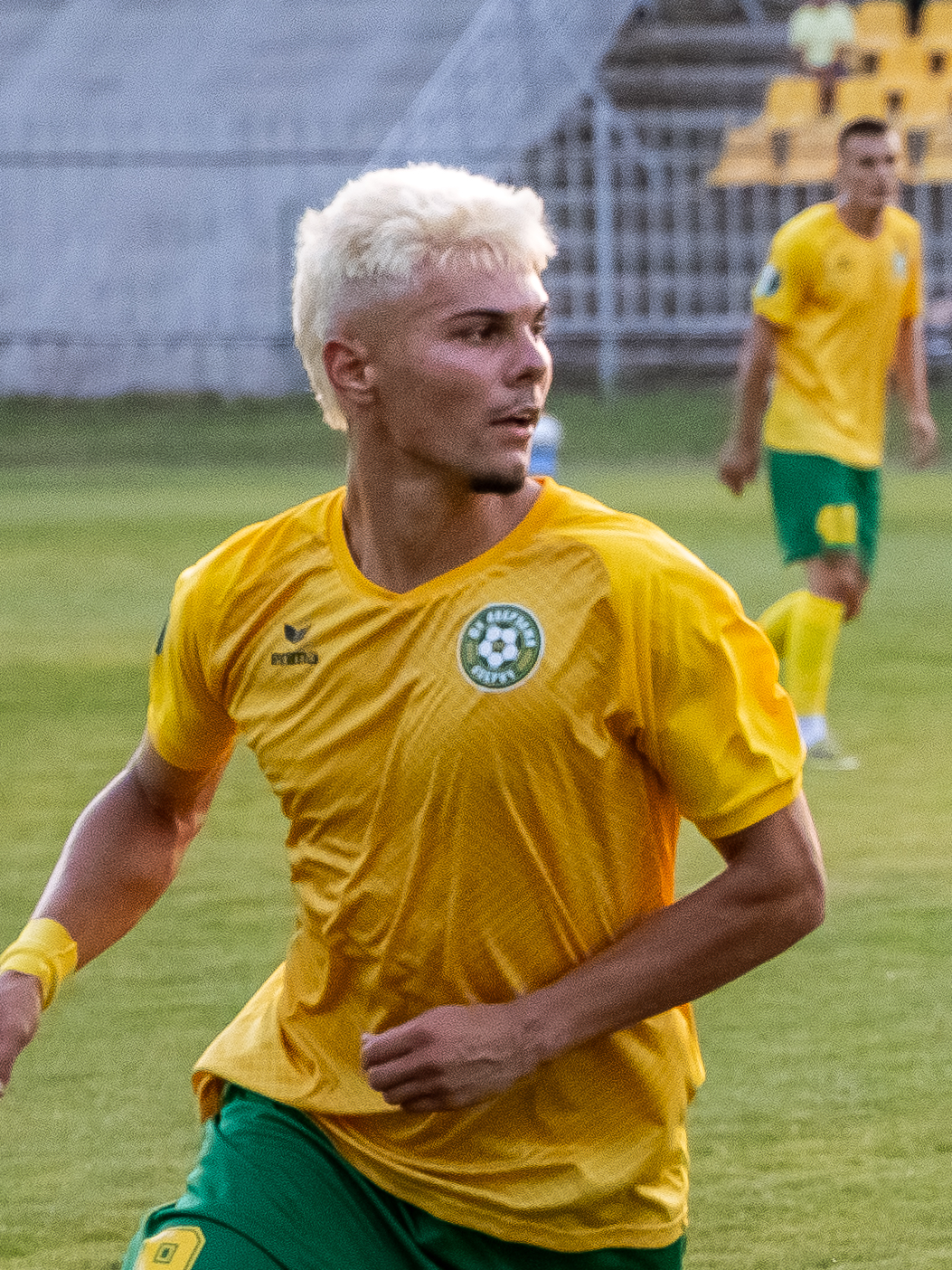

Personal information
- Full name: Daniel Todorov Halachev
- Date of birth: 8 March 2005 (age 21)
- Place of birth: Varna, Bulgaria
- Height: 1.85 m (6 ft 1 in)
- Position: Forward

Team information
- Current team: Dobrudzha (on loan from Spartak Varna)
- Number: 9

Youth career
- Spartak Varna

Senior career*
| Years | Team | Apps | (Gls) |
| 2022–2025 | Spartak Varna II | 71 | (32) |
| 2024– | Spartak Varna | 24 | (2) |
| 2025 | → Lovech (loan) | 7 | (0) |
| 2026 | → Fratria II (loan) | 1 | (0) |
| 2026 | → Fratria (loan) | 10 | (2) |
| 2026– | → Dobrudzha (loan) | 15 | (9) |
- * Club domestic league appearances and goals as of 12:15, 31 October 2026 (UTC)

Daniel Halachev (Bulgarian: Даниел Халачев; born 8 March 2005) is a Bulgarian professional footballer who plays as a forward for Second League club Dobrudzha Dobrich on loan from Spartak Varna.

== Career ==
Halachev started his career in the local Spartak Varna academy. In 2023 he trained with the first squad for first time. In June 2024 he signed his first professional contract with Spartak Varna. In February 2025 he was sent on loan to Second League team Lovech. On 20 January 2026, he was sent on loan until end of season to Second League team Fratria.

== Career statistics ==
As of 26 January 2026

Appearances and goals by club, season and competition
| Club | Season | League | | | Bulgarian Cup | | Europe | | Other | | Total | |
| Club | Season | Division | Apps | Goals | Apps | Goals | Apps | Goals | Apps | Goals | Apps | Goals |
|---|---|---|---|---|---|---|---|---|---|---|---|---|
| Spartak Varna | 2023–24 | Bulgarian Second League | 6 | 1 | 0 | 0 | – | | – | | 6 | 1 |
| Spartak Varna | 2024–25 | Bulgarian First League | 5 | 0 | 1 | 0 | – | | – | | 6 | 0 |
| Spartak Varna | 2025–26 | Bulgarian First League | 13 | 1 | 2 | 1 | – | | – | | 15 | 2 |
| Spartak Varna | Total | | 24 | 2 | 3 | 1 | 0 | 0 | 0 | 0 | 27 | 3 |
| Lovech (loan) | 2024–25 | Bulgarian Second League | 7 | 0 | 0 | 0 | – | | – | | 7 | 0 |
| Fratria (loan) | 2025–26 | Bulgarian Second League | 0 | 0 | 0 | 0 | – | | – | | 0 | 0 |
| Career total | | | 31 | 2 | 3 | 1 | 0 | 0 | 0 | 0 | 34 | 3 |
