= 2026–27 Second Professional Football League (Bulgaria) =

70th season of the Second Professional Football League (Bulgaria)

Second Professional Football League
- Season: 2026–27
- Dates: July 2026 – June 2027
- Matches: 152
- Goals: 429 (2.82 per match)
- Top goalscorer: Milcho Angelov (11 goals)
- Best goalkeeper: Hennadiy Hanyev (8 clean sheets)
- Biggest home win: Nesebar 7–0 Pirin Blagoevgrad (23 August 2026)
- Biggest away win: Montana 0–5 Hebar Pazardzhik (21 September 2026); Dobrudzha 0–5 Fratria (19 November 2026)
- Highest scoring: Fratria 6–2 Sportist Svoge (9 November 2026)
- Longest winning run: 4 games Vihren Sandanski
- Longest unbeaten run: 9 games Fratria Varna; Vihren Sandanski
- Longest winless run: 17 games Pirin Blagoevgrad
- Longest losing run: 11 games Pirin Blagoevgrad
- All statistics correct as of 15:18, 22 November 2026 (UTC).

The 2026–27 Second Professional Football League, also known as MrBit Second League for sponsorship reasons, will be the 71st season of the Second League, the second tier of the Bulgarian football league system, and the 11th season under this name and current league structure.

This season there will be 20 teams and there are some changes regarding promotion and relegation teams: At the top of the standings, the first respectively will win direct promotion to First League, while the 2nd and 3rd teams will play a play-off with the teams finishing 12th and 13th in the 2026/27 First League season.

For the relegated teams, due to the fact that from the 2027/28 season in the Second League, the teams will be 16th in the current season, the teams that will be directly relegated are a total of 6 (from 14th to 20th place), and the team finishing 13th will play a play-off for staying/relegation in the Third League for the next season against the winner of the play-off between the champions of the North-East Third League and North-West Third League.

== Teams ==
The following teams have changed divisions since the 2025–26 season.

=== To Second League ===
Promoted from Third League

- Nesebar
- Rilski Sportist

Relegated from First League

- Beroe
- Dobrudzha
- Montana

=== From Second League ===
Relegated to Third League

- Belasitsa Petrich
- Minyor Pernik
- Sevlievo

Promoted to First League

- Dunav Ruse

Declined promotion

- Chernomorets Balchik
- Lokomotiv Mezdra

== Stadiums and locations ==
Location of teams in 2026–27 Second League

Team	City	Stadium	Capacity
Beroe	Stara Zagora	Stadion Beroe	12,128
Chernomorets	Burgas	Lazur	18,037
CSKA II	Sofia	Dragalevtsi	2,500
Dobrudzha	Dobrich	Druzhba	12,500
Etar	Veliko Tarnovo	Ivaylo	18,000
Fratria	Varna	Spartak	6,000
Hebar	Pazardzhik	Georgi Benkovski	13,128
Lokomotiv	Gorna Oryahovitsa	Lokomotiv	10,500
Ludogorets II	Razgrad	Eagles' Nest	2,000
Marek	Dupnitsa	Bonchuk	16,000
Montana	Montana	Ogosta	6,000
Nesebar	Nesebar	Nesebar Stadium	7,000
Pirin	Blagoevgrad	Hristo Botev	7,500
Rilski Sportist	Samokov	Iskar	7,000
Spartak	Pleven	Pleven	22,000
Sportist	Svoge	Chavdar Tsvetkov	3,500
Vihren	Sandanski	Sandanski	6,000
Yantra	Gabrovo	Hristo Botev	14,000

== League table ==
Pos	Team	Pld	W	D	L	GF	GA	GD	Pts	
1	Vihren	17	10	5	2	38	15	+23	35	Promotion to the First League
2	Chernomorets Burgas	17	9	6	2	31	15	+16	33	Qualification for the promotion play-off
3	CSKA Sofia II	16	9	5	2	32	14	+18	32	Ineligible for promotion
4	Fratria Varna	16	9	4	3	32	16	+16	31	Qualification for the promotion play-off
5	Yantra Gabrovo	16	8	3	5	25	18	+7	27	
6	Hebar	17	8	3	6	36	27	+9	27	
7	Spartak Pleven	17	7	4	6	20	27	−7	25	
8	Ludogorets Razgrad II	16	7	4	5	24	17	+7	25	Ineligible for promotion
9	Lokomotiv Gorna Oryahovitsa	17	6	6	5	15	16	−1	24	
10	Beroe	16	6	4	6	24	24	0	22	
11	Etar	16	6	4	6	26	26	0	22	
12	Rilski Sportist	17	5	7	5	18	18	0	22	
13	Montana	17	5	4	8	20	30	−10	19	Qualification for the relegation play-off
14	Nesebar	17	5	4	8	25	27	−2	19	Relegation to the Third League
15	Marek	17	5	3	9	18	27	−9	18	Relegation to the Third League
16	Sportist Svoge	17	3	6	8	14	24	−10	15	Relegation to the Third League
17	Dobrudzha	17	2	6	9	16	34	−18	12	Relegation to the Third League
18	Pirin Blagoevgrad	17	0	2	15	9	48	−39	2	Relegation to the Third League

Updated to match(es) played on 22 November 2026. Source: bulgarian-football.com
Rules for classification: 1) Points; 2) Head-to-head points; 3) Head-to-head goal difference; 4) Head-to-head goals scored; 5) Head-to-head away goals scored (only if two teams); 6) Goal difference; 7) Goals scored; 8) Fairplay ranking; 9) Draw.

== Results ==
Home \ Away	BER	CHE	CSS	DOB	ETV	FRA	HEB	LGO	LUD	MAR	MON	NES	PIR	RIL	SPA	SPO	VIH	YAN
Beroe	—	4 Dec					2–1		2–0		0–0		3–3	3–1	3–0	1–0	0–3	1–0
Chernomorets Burgas	1–0	—	0–1					28 Nov	1–0		2–0			1–1	3–0	1–1		3–3
CSKA Sofia II	23 Nov		—				4–3		1–1		4–0		6 Dec	3–1	5–1	1–0	30 Nov	3–3
Dobrudzha	2–2	0–3	1–3	—	2–2	0–5							5–1	0–0		0–0		0–1
Etar	2–2	2–4	1–0		—	2–0				1–0	1–1	29 Nov		1–1		1–2		2–1
Fratria Varna	2–0	2–2	1–0			—				0–1	1–2			1–0	3–0	6–2		24 Nov
Hebar	30 Nov	1–0		1–2	4–1	1–1	—	3–1		3–1		2–1					2–3	
Lokomotiv Gorna Oryahovitsa	2–0	1–1	0–0	2–0	2–1	0–2		—	5 Dec	0–0		1–1	2–0					
Ludogorets Razgrad II				5–1	25 Nov	1–1	1–1	2–1	—	3–0		2–0		29 Nov			0–2	
Marek	3–2	1–3	1–3	4–2		30 Nov				—			3–0	1–2	6 Dec	1–0		
Montana				0–0			0–5	3–0	2–3	1–0	—	3–1			1–2	28 Nov	1–4	
Nesebar	4–3	1–2	0–0	2–0	1–5	2–3					5 Dec	—	7–0	2–1				1–1
Pirin Blagoevgrad		0–3	0–3	28 Nov	0–2	1–2	2–3		0–3		0–1		—		1–1			
Rilski Sportist						6 Dec	1–1	0–0	0–1		2–1		1–0	—	2–2	2–1	0–0	2–0
Spartak Pleven				1–1	2–1		3–2	0–1	1–0	2–1		1–1			—		0–2	29 Nov
Sportist Svoge				5 Dec			1–3	0–0	1–1	0–0	2–2	0–1	1–0		0–2	—	3–2	
Vihren		1–1	1–1	2–0	4–1	2–2	5 Dec	3–1		1–1		2–0	6–1				—	
Yantra					5 Dec		3–0	0–1	3–1	3–0	3–2		2–0		0–2	1–0	1–0	—

Updated to match(es) played on 22 November 2026. Source: bulgarian-football.com
Legend: Blue = home team win; Yellow = draw; Red = away team win.
For upcoming matches, an "a" indicates there is an article about the rivalry between the two participants.

=== Results by round ===
Team ╲ Round	1	2	3	4	5	6	7	8	9	10	11	12	13	14	15	16	17
Beroe	W	L	W	L	W	D	D	D	W	L	W	L	W	L	D	W	
Chernomorets Burgas	D	W	D	L	L	W	W	D	W	W	W	W	D	W	D	W	D
CSKA Sofia II	D	W	W	W	D	L	W	L	W	W	W	D	D	W	W	D	
Dobrudzha	W	D	L	L	L	D	L	D	L	L	W	D	L	L	D	D	D
Etar Veliko Tarnovo	W	W	W	D	L	D	L	W	L	L		W	L	W	D	D	L
Fratria Varna	L	W	W	W	D	W	D	D	D	W	W	L	L	W	W	W	
Hebar Pazardzhik	L	L	L	W	W	D	D	L	W	W	L	W	W	L	W	D	W
Lokomotiv Gorna Oryahovitsa	D	L	L	W	W	L	W	D	D	W	D	D	W	W	L	D	L
Ludogorets Razgrad II	W	W	L	L	D	D	L	W	D	L		W	W	D	W	L	W
Marek Dupnitsa	W	L	L	L	W	D	W	L	W	L	D	W	D	L	L	L	L
Montana	D	W	L	W	L	W	D	L	L	L	L	L	W	L	D	W	D
Nesebar	L	L	W	L	W	D	L	W	D	W	L	D	L	L	L	L	D
Pirin Blagoevgrad	L	L	L	L	L	L	L	L	L	L	L	D	L	L	D	L	L
Rilski Sportist	L	L	D	D	W	D	W	L	W	W	W	D	L	D	L	D	D
Spartak Pleven	W	W	D	L	L	L	L	W	L	W	L	D	W	W	D	W	D
Sportist Svoge	D	D	W	L	L	D	L	D	L	W	L	L	D	D	L	L	W
Vihren Sandanski	D	W	D	W	D	W	W	W	W	L	W	L	D	D	W	W	W
Yantra Gabrovo	L	L	W	W	W	D	W	W	L	L	L	W	D	W	D	W	

Updated to match(es) played on 22 November 2026. Source: Bulgarian Football
W = Win; D = Draw; L = Loss; - = Annulled

=== Positions by round ===
Team ╲ Round	1	2	3	4	5	6	7	8	9	10	11	12	13	14	15	16	17
Beroe	4	10	4	7	6	8	6	8	6	7	5	8	5	7	8	9	
Chernomorets Burgas	9	8	8	12	16	9	5	7	5	4	4	3	3	2	2	3	
CSKA Sofia II	10	5	2	2	1	3	3	5	2	2	2	1	1	1	1	1	
Dobrudzha	2	4	10	13	17	17	17	17	17	17	17	17	17	17	17	17	17
Etar	1	1	1	1	2	3	7	4	7	11	11	11	14	11	11	10	
Fratria	13	11	5	3	3	1	2	3	3	3	3	4	4	6	4	4	
Hebar	15	14	17	15	13	13	13	15	13	10	10	10	7	9	6	8	
Lokomotiv Gorna Oryahovitsa	11	13	16	14	9	11	10	11	11	9	8	9	6	4	7	6	
Ludogorets Razgrad II	5	3	6	10	8	10	14	10	10	14	14	13	11	12	9	11	
Marek Dupnitsa	6	9	12	16	12	14	9	13	9	13	12	12	10	13	13	14	15
Montana	7	7	11	5	10	6	8	9	13	15	15	15	15	15	15	13	13
Nesebar	17	17	14	9	4	7	11	6	8	5	7	7	12	14	14	15	14
Pirin Blagoevgrad	18	18	18	18	18	18	18	18	18	18	18	18	18	18	18	18	18
Rilski Sportist	14	15	15	17	14	15	12	14	12	8	6	6	9	10	12	12	12
Spartak Pleven	3	2	3	6	11	12	15	12	15	12	13	14	13	8	10	7	
Sportist Svoge	8	12	9	11	15	16	16	16	16	16	16	16	16	16	16	16	16
Vihren Sandanski	12	6	7	4	5	2	1	1	1	1	1	2	2	3	3	2	
Yantra Gabrovo	16	16	13	8	7	5	4	2	4	6	9	6	8	5	5	5	

Updated to match(es) played on 15 November 2026. Source: Bulgarian Football

== Season statistics ==
=== Top scorers ===
As of 15 November 2026

Rank	Player	Club	Goals
1	(Bulgaria) Milcho Angelov	Yantra	11
2	(Bulgaria) Daniel Halachev	Dobrudzha	9
3	(Bulgaria) Zapro Dinev	Beroe	7
3	(Bulgaria) Ivaylo Mihaylov	Hebar	7
5	(Bulgaria) Krasian Kolev	Chernomorets Burgas	6
5	(Bulgaria) Zhivko Petkov	Chernomorets Burgas	6
5	(Bulgaria) Stefan Statev	Nesebar	6
5	(Bulgaria) Radoslav Zhivkov	CSKA Sofia II	6
9	(Spain) Ismael Ferrer	Beroe	5
9	(Bulgaria) Yulian Gilov	CSKA Sofia II	5
9	(Bulgaria) Georgi Karakashev	Montana	5
9	(Ukraine) Tymur Korablin	Fratria	5
9	(Bulgaria) Kristiyan Parashkevov	Nesebar	5
9	(Bulgaria) Mario Ivov	Vihren	5
9	(Bulgaria) Stefan Tsonkov	Hebar	5
9	(Bulgaria) Konstantin Yordanov	CSKA Sofia II	5

=== Clean sheets ===
As of 22 November 2026

Rank	Player	Club	Clean sheets
1	(Ukraine) Hennadiy Hanyev	Lokomotiv GO	8
2	(Bulgaria) Georgi Argilashki	Chernomorets Burgas	6
2	(Bulgaria) Daniel Nikolov	CSKA Sofia II	6
4	(Bulgaria) Konstantin Kostadinov	Marek	5
4	(Bulgaria) Iliyan Iliev	Fratria	5
4	(Bulgaria) Hristiyan Vasilev	Yantra	5
9	(France) Yann Batola	Sportist Svoge	4
9	(Bulgaria) Ivan Goshev	Beroe	4
9	(Bulgaria) Stanislav Nistorov	Vihren	4
10	(Bulgaria) Hristiyan Ivanov	Nesebar	3
10	(Bulgaria) Yulian Veskov	Montana	3
10	(Bulgaria) Ivaylo Nedelchev	Rilski Sportist	3
10	(Bulgaria) Nikola Videnov	Etar	3
10	(Bulgaria) Petar Petrov	Spartak Pleven	3
10	(Bulgaria) Dimitar Iliev	Dobrudzha	3
16	(Bulgaria) Aleksandar Mihaylov	Vihren	2
16	(Bulgaria) Dragomir Petkov	Rilski Sportist	2
16	(Bulgaria) Zlatomir Stoimenov	Ludogorets Razgrad II	2
16	(Bulgaria) Aleksandar Panayotov	Ludogorets Razgrad II	2
16	(Bulgaria) Vasil Simeonov	Montana	2
21	(Bulgaria) Angel Martinov	Etar	1
21	(Bulgaria) Kristiyan Milushev	Lokomotiv GO	1
21	(Bulgaria) Martin Yankov	Hebar	1
21	(Bulgaria) Boris Gruev	Hebar	1
21	(Bulgaria) Dimitar Evtimov	CSKA Sofia II	1
21	(Bulgaria) Martin Sheytanov	Nesebar	1
21	(Bulgaria) Hristo Lalev	Yantra	1
21	(Bulgaria) Stanislav Tanev	Fratria	1
