= 2024–25 FC Fratria season =

Fratria
2024–25 season
- Chairman: Viktor Bakurevich
- Manager: Emanuel Lukanov (until 14 November 2024); Vasil Petrov (from 15 November 2024)
- Stadium: Albena 1 Stadium, Albena
- Second League: 14th
- Bulgarian Cup: Round of 32
- Top goalscorer: League: Georgi Lazarov (9); All: Georgi Lazarov; Denislav Angelov (9)
- Biggest win: 5–1 v. Belasitsa Petrich (H)
- Biggest defeat: 0–4 v. Dunav Ruse (H); 4–0 v. Dunav Ruse (A)
Home colours	Away colours	Third colours

The 2024–25 season is the 4th season in the history of FC Fratria and their first season in the Second League. In addition to the domestic league, the club would also participate in the Bulgarian Cup.

== Staff ==
Position	Name	Nationality
Coaching staff
Head coach	Vasil Petrov	(Bulgaria)
Assistant coach	Yevhen Lutsenko	(Ukraine)
Assistant coach	Denys Vasin	(Ukraine)
Fratria II coach	Evgeny Gashchuk	(Russia)
Youth coach	Dilyan Georgiev	(Bulgaria)
Goalkeepers coach	Oleksandr Lavrentsov	(Ukraine)
Conditioning coach	Atanas Stefanov	(Bulgaria)
Administrator	Evgeni Nikolaev	(Bulgaria)

== Squad ==
As of 25 May 2025

Note: Flags indicate national team as has been defined under FIFA eligibility rules. Players may hold more than one non-FIFA nationality.

Squad no.	Player	Nationality	Position(s)	Date of birth (age)	Matches	Goals	Signed in	Previous club
Goalkeepers
1	Stefan Petkov	(Bulgaria)	GK	26 May 2002 (age 24)	7	0	2024	(Bulgaria) Spartak Varna II
12	Andriyan Kalev	(Bulgaria)	GK	20 August 2009 (age 17)	0	0	2023	Youth system
26	Erik Georgiev	(Bulgaria)	GK	2 January 2007 (age 19)	0	0	2023	Youth system
33	Igor Mostovei	(Moldova)	GK	25 September 1999 (age 27)	15	0	2025 (winter)	(Moldova) Milsami
Defenders
3	Aleksandar Angelov	(Bulgaria)	CB / RB	27 May 2002 (age 24)	36	2	2024	(Bulgaria) Litex Lovech
4	Serhiy Chyzhyk	(Ukraine) (Note: Chyzhik holds both Ukrainian and Bulgarian passport)	LB / RB	30 May 2005 (age 21)	7	0	2024	(Bulgaria) Cherno More II
5	Vasil Dobrev	(Bulgaria)	CB	5 January 1998 (age 28)	51	2	2023	(Bulgaria) Septemvri Tervel
6	Kaloyan Ivanov	(Bulgaria)	CB	17 January 2007 (age 19)	6	0	2024	(Bulgaria) Dunav Ruse
13	Galin Minkov	(Bulgaria)	LB	2 November 1997 (age 29)	9	0	2025 (winter)	(Bulgaria) Montana
17	Martin Kostadinov	(Bulgaria)	LB / LW	13 May 1996 (age 30)	50	5	2023	(Bulgaria) Dunav Ruse
23	Mike Bettinger	(Central African Republic) (Note: Bettinger is born in France and also holds French passport)	RB / RW	28 January 2004 (age 22)	12	1	2025 (winter)	(France) Le Mans
24	Ivaylo Petrov	(Bulgaria)	LB	13 August 2006 (age 20)	4	0	2024	(Bulgaria) Dunav Ruse
71	Ibryam Ibryam	(Bulgaria)	CB / LB	12 January 2001 (age 25)	62	4	2023	(Bulgaria) Dobrudzha Dobrich
	Nikola Zahariev	(Bulgaria)	CB / LB	23 December 2008 (age 17)	1	0	2024	Youth system
Midfielders
8	Steliyan Dobrev	(Bulgaria)	AM / CM	12 November 2003 (age 22)	39	4	2024 (Winter)	(Bulgaria) CSKA 1948
9	Denis Kadir	(Bulgaria)	AM / ST	2 July 1999 (age 27)	60	14	2023	(Bulgaria) Septemvri Tervel
16	Arseniy Bogdanov	(Ukraine)	DM / CM	1 November 2007 (age 19)	1	0	2022	(Ukraine) Chornomorets Odessa
19	Vasile Bitlan	(Moldova)	AM / CM	31 January 2003 (age 23)	19	1	2024	(Moldova) Dacia Buiucani
21	Iliyan Kapitanov	(Bulgaria)	LW / RW	21 May 1992 (age 34)	31	4	2024	(Bulgaria) Litex Lovech
22	David Lukanov	(Bulgaria)	DM / CM	1 March 2004 (age 22)	13	0	2024	(Bulgaria) Cherno More II
69	Dylan Junior Abé	(France)	RW / LW	6 November 2002 (age 24)	16	0	2025 (winter)	(Bulgaria) Lokomotiv Gorna Oryahovitsa
74	Mikhail Gashchuk	(Bulgaria) (Note: Gashchuk is born in Russia)	CM / AM / ST	4 January 2007 (age 19)	24	2	2023 (Note: Left Fratria in 2022 for Botev, before return in 2023.)	(Bulgaria) Botev Plovdiv
	Rosen Zakaryan	(Bulgaria)	DM / CM	24 September 2007 (age 19)	4	0	2024	(Bulgaria) Dunav Ruse
	Denislav Hasanov	(Bulgaria)	DM / CM	21 August 2007 (age 19)	2	0	2024	(Bulgaria) Cherno More
	Nikolay Iliev	(Bulgaria)	CM	1 January 2009 (age 17)	0	0	2024	Youth system
	Preslav Petkov	(Bulgaria)	CM	1 January 2008 (age 18)	0	0	2024	Youth system
	Platon Bakurevich	(Bulgaria) (Note: Bakurevich holds both Bulgarian and Russian citizenship)	CM	21 June 2007 (age 19)	5	0	2021	Youth system
Forwards
10	Xavello Druiventak	(Netherlands)	RW / LW / AM	3 May 2004 (age 22)	22	7	2024	(Lithuania) Tauras Tauragė
11	Lachezar Voykov	(Bulgaria)	ST / LW / RW	23 December 2006 (age 19)	30	3	2022	Youth system
18	Nikola Totev	(Bulgaria)	ST	24 May 2006 (age 20)	11	0	2024	(Bulgaria) Dunav Ruse
20	Maksim Marinov	(Bulgaria)	RW / LW / AM	22 April 2008 (age 18)	18	0	2023	(Bulgaria) Ludogorets Razgrad Academy
77	Georgi Lazarov	(Bulgaria)	ST	10 May 2004 (age 22)	29	9	2024	(Bulgaria) Spartak Plovdiv
	Stefan Stefanov	(Bulgaria)	ST	2 August 2008 (age 18)	3	0	2023	(Bulgaria) Cherno More Varna U17
Out on Loan
Left Permanently During the Season
2	Ivaylo Popov	(Bulgaria)	RB	21 June 2005 (age 21)	24	0	2022	Youth system
7	Denislav Angelov	(Bulgaria)	ST / LW / RW	8 June 2001 (age 25)	20	8	2024	(Belgium) Eendracht Aalst
10	Yancho Andreev	(Bulgaria)	LW / AM	8 January 1990 (age 36)	16	4	2024 (winter)	(Bulgaria) Dobrudzha Dobrich
14	Dimitar Burov	(Bulgaria)	LB	31 August 1997 (age 29)	6	0	2024	(Bulgaria) Montana
15	Viktor Ignatov	(Bulgaria)	DM / CM	9 June 2007 (age 19)	0	0	2024	(Bulgaria) Dunav Ruse
19	Nikola Borisov	(Bulgaria)	CB	21 November 2000 (age 25)	22	2	2023	(Bulgaria) Spartak Varna
23	Emil Yanchev	(Bulgaria)	DM / CM	8 February 1999 (age 27)	7	1	2024	(Bulgaria) Montana
28	Oleksandr Filonchuk	(Ukraine)	RB	19 July 2004 (age 22)	5	0	2022	(Ukraine) Chornomorets Odesa
30	Denis Corso	(Bulgaria) (Note: Corso holds both Italian and Bulgarian passport)	CB / LB	30 May 2005 (age 21)	4	0	2024	(Bulgaria) Cherno More II
33	Georgi Kitanov	(Bulgaria)	GK	6 March 1995 (age 31)	17	0	2024	(Malta) Floriana
39	Denys Vasin	(Ukraine)	ST	4 March 1989 (age 37)	20	13	2023	(Ukraine) Kryvbas Kryvyi Rih
50	Momchil Yordanov	(British Virgin Islands) (Note: Yordanov holds both Bulgarian and British Virgin Islands passport)	CB	28 February 2007 (age 19)	0	0	2024	(England) Beechwood School Academia and Football
66	Vasil Andoni	(Moldova) (Note: Andoni is born in Varna, Bulgaria)	ST	22 June 2000 (age 26)	44	32	2022	(Moldova) Dinamo-Auto Tiraspol
75	Andriy Lisak	(Ukraine)	ST / LW	9 October 2005 (age 21)	40	12	2022	(Ukraine) Kramatorsk
81	Oleksiy Mazhynskyi	(Ukraine)	ST	19 April 2005 (age 21)	7	2	2023 (Winter)	(Switzerland) Team Ticino
96	Valentin Dimitrov	(Bulgaria)	GK	13 February 2006 (age 20)	0	0	2023	(Bulgaria) Etar Veliko Tarnovo

== Transfers ==
For all recent transfers, see Transfers summer 2024 and Transfers winter 2024–25.

=== In ===
Date	Position	Player	From	Fee	Ref.
4 June 2024	DF	(Bulgaria) Dimitar Burov	Montana	Free transfer	
7 June 2024	MF	(Bulgaria) Iliyan Kapitanov	Litex Lovech	Free transfer	
7 June 2024	FW	(Bulgaria) Georgi Lazarov	Spartak Plovdiv	Free transfer	
11 June 2024	FW	(Bulgaria) Denislav Angelov	(Belgium) Eendracht Aalst	Free transfer	
11 June 2024	CB	(Bulgaria) Aleksandar Angelov	Litex Lovech	Free transfer	
11 June 2024	DM	(Bulgaria) Emil Yanchev	Montana	Free transfer	
17 June 2024	GK	(Bulgaria) Georgi Kitanov	(Malta) Floriana	Free transfer	
23 June 2024	GK	(Bulgaria) Stefan Petkov	Spartak Varna II	Free transfer	
30 August 2024	MF	(Moldova) Vasile Bitlan	(Moldova) Dacia Buiucani	Free transfer	
1 October 2024	FW	(Netherlands) Xavello Druiventak	(Lithuania) Tauras Tauragė	Free transfer	
6 January 2025	DF	(Bulgaria) Galin Minkov	Montana	Free transfer	
13 January 2025	GK	(Moldova) Igor Mostovei	(Moldova) Milsami	Free transfer	
15 January 2025	DF	(Central African Republic) Mike Bettinger	(France) Le Mans	Free transfer	
31 January 2025	MF	(France) Dylan Junior Abé	Lokomotiv Gorna Oryahovitsa	€10 000	

=== Out ===
Date	Position	Player	To	Fee	Ref.
7 June 2024	MF	(Bulgaria) Ivelin Kuzmanov	Septemvri Tervel	Free transfer	
9 June 2024	DF	(Armenia) David Shakaryan	Lokomotiv Mezdra	Free Transfer	
9 June 2024	FW	(Brazil) Lucas Macedo	(Greece) AO Karavas	Released	
19 June 2024	GK	(Bulgaria) Hristiyan Hristov		Released	
4 July 2024	DF	(Bulgaria) Valeri Hristov	Septemvri Tervel	Free transfer	
11 July 2024	DF	(Bulgaria) Dimitar Vasilev	Aksakovo	Free transfer	
12 July 2024	MF	(Bulgaria) Yordan Toskov	Chernomorets Balchik	Free transfer	
12 July 2024	MF	(Russia) Artur Avetisyan	Septemvri Tervel	Free transfer	
1 August 2024	DF	(Bulgaria) Yasen Minchev	Septemvri Tervel	Free transfer	
1 August 2024	FW	(Ukraine) Oleksiy Mazhynskyi	Botev Novi Pazar	Released	
29 August 2024	MF	(Bulgaria) Yancho Andreev	Sportist Svoge	Released	
29 August 2024	DF	(Bulgaria) Dimitar Burov	Montana	Free transfer	
29 August 2024	DF	(Bulgaria) Nikola Borisov	CSKA Sofia II	Released	
2 September 2024	FW	(Ukraine) Denys Vasin	Retired		
3 September 2024	DF	(Ukraine) Oleksandr Filonchuk	Septemvri Tervel	Free transfer	
7 September 2024	GK	(Bulgaria) Valentin Dimitrov	Spartak Varna II	Free transfer	
1 October 2024	DF	(British Virgin Islands) Momchil Yordanov	(England) Eastbourne Borough	Free transfer	
12 December 2024	GK	(Bulgaria) Georgi Kitanov			
17 December 2024	FW	(Moldova) Vasil Andoni			
3 January 2025	MF	(Bulgaria) Emil Yanchev			
4 January 2025	DF	(Bulgaria) Ivaylo Popov	Chernomorets Balchik	Free transfer	
16 January 2025	DF	(Bulgaria) Denis Corso	Lovech	Free transfer	
12 February 2025	FW	(Ukraine) Andriy Lisak			
18 February 2025	FW	(Bulgaria) Denislav Angelov			

=== Loaned in ===
Date	Position	Player	From	Date until	Ref.

=== Loaned out ===
Date	Position	Player	To	Date until	Ref.

== Pre-season and friendlies ==
On 6 June, Fratria announced they would spend the pre-season training camp in Varna and Albena, to face Ludogorets II, Dobrudzha Dobrich, Nesebar, Cherno More, Cherno More II and Fratria II The winter camp was divided by two parts. In Bulgaria, the team set 3 friendlies games, agnaist their second team, Spartak Varna and Nesebar. From 27 January to 6 February, the team training camp moves to Alanya, Turkey, were they are set to play 3 friendlies against Chornomorets Odesa and 2 more teams yet to be announced.

Win Draw Loss Fixtures

22 June 2024 Pre-season	Ludogorets II	1–0	Fratria	Razgrad
	Todorov 90'	Report		Stadium: Eagles' Nest

29 June 2024 Pre-season	Dobrudzha Dobrich	2–1	Fratria	Obrochishte
	Dimitrov 59' Pepinho 66'	Report	Angelov 64'	Stadium: Obrochishte Stadium

3 July 2024 Pre-season	Nesebar	2–2	Fratria	Obzor
	Hristov 35' Pyuskyulyu 70'	Report	Andoni 41' (pen.) Gashchuk 51'	Stadium: Obzor Stadium

5 July 2024 Pre-season	Fratria	0–1	Spartak Varna	Albena
		Report	Halachev 54'	Stadium: Albena Stadium 1

10 July 2024 Pre-season	Cherno More	0–1	Fratria	Varna
		Report	Andoni 90'	Stadium: Mladost Stadium

13 July 2024 Pre-season	Cherno More II	0–0	Fratria	Albena
		Report		Stadium: Albena Stadium 1

13 July 2024 Pre-season	Fratria	4–0	Fratria II	Albena
				Stadium: Albena Stadium 1

11 January 2025 Winter camp	Fratria	3–2	Fratria II	Obrochishte
	Lazarov 72' S. Dobrev 75' Angelov (pen.), 90+5'		Chyzhik 52' Kunitsyn 83'	Stadium: Obrochishte Stadium

18 January 2025 Winter camp	Spartak Varna	2–1	Fratria	Varna
11:00 CET	Baurenski 19' Berna 28'		Lazarov 72'	Stadium: Spartak Stadium

25 January 2025 Winter camp	Fratria	2–0	Nesebar	Obzor
			Voykov Kapitanov	Stadium: Obzor Stadium

29 January 2025 Winter camp	Fratria	v	(Ukraine) Dynamo Kyiv U19	Alanya, Turkey
				Stadium: Goldcity Sport Complex

1 February 2025 Winter camp	Fratria	0–3	(Ukraine) Livyi Bereh Kyiv	Alanya, Turkey
			Voytsekhovskyi 54' Shastal 73' Diego Henrique 88'	Stadium: Goldcity Sport Complex

4 February 2025 Winter camp	Fratria	1–2	(Ukraine) Chornomorets Odesa	Alanya, Turkey
	Lazarov 35'		Shevtsov 42' Khoblenko 48'	Stadium: Arslan Zeki Demirci Sports Complex

8 February 2025 Winter camp	Fratria	2–2	Septemvri Tervel	Balchik
	Kapitanov (pen.) Druiventak 59'		Daniel Dimov 42' Taner Yunsyu	Stadium: Balchik Stadium

8 February 2025 Winter camp	Fratria	1–0	Chernomorets Balchik	Balchik
	Lazarov 74'			Stadium: Balchik Stadium

== Competitions ==
=== Vtora Liga ===
==== League table ====
Pos	Team	Pld	W	D	L	GF	GA	GD	Pts	Promotion, qualification or relegation
12	Ludogorets Razgrad II	38	13	12	13	53	42	+11	51	Ineligible for promotion
13	CSKA Sofia II	38	12	13	13	47	41	+6	49	Ineligible for promotion
14	Fratria	38	13	9	16	45	50	−5	48	
15	Minyor Pernik	38	11	8	19	36	56	−20	41	
16	Sportist Svoge	38	8	13	17	22	40	−18	37	

Source: bulgarian-football.com
Rules for classification: 1) Points; 2) Head-to-head points; 3) Head-to-head goal difference; 4) Head-to-head goals scored; 5) Head-to-head away goals scored (only if two teams); 6) Goal difference; 7) Goals scored; 8) Fairplay ranking; 9) Draw.

==== Matches ====
Win Draw Loss Fixtures

20 July 2024 1	Fratria	1–1	Dobrudzha Dobrich	Albena
	Yanchev 49'	Report	Rumenov 70'	Stadium: Albena 1 Stadium; Attendance: 450; Referee: Mariyan Grebencharski

27 July 2024 2	Sportist Svoge	0–1	Fratria	Svoge
		Report	S. Dobrev 53'	Stadium: Chavdar Tsvetkov; Attendance: 220

3 August 2024 3	Fratria	0–1	Pirin Blagoevgrad	Albena
		Report	Dyulgerov 8'	Stadium: Albena 1 Stadium; Attendance: 250

10 August 2024 4	Fratria	0–2	CSKA Sofia II	Albena
		Report	Bornosuzov 35' Tasev 56'	Stadium: Albena 1 Stadium; Attendance: 180

17 August 2024 5	Spartak Pleven	0–0	Fratria	Pleven
		Report		Stadium: Stadion Pleven; Attendance: 700

24 August 2024 6	Fratria	1–0	Nesebar	Albena
	Angelov 35'	Report		Stadium: Albena 1 Stadium; Attendance: 250

31 August 2024 7	Ludogorets Razgrad II	2–0	Fratria	Razgrad
	Stefanov 18' Kelyovluev (pen.), 56'	Report		Stadium: Eagles' Nest; Attendance: 200

7 September 2024 8	Fratria	1–2	Montana	Albena
	Bitlan 89'	Report	Kouakou 61' Ejike 67'	Stadium: Albena 1 Stadium; Attendance: 300

14 September 2024 9	Yantra Gabrovo	1–2	Fratria	Gabrovo
	Toshev (pen.), 14'	Report	D. Angelov 63' 79'	Stadium: Stadion Hristo Botev, Gabrovo; Attendance: 250

21 September 2024 10	Fratria	1–1	Minyor Pernik	Kavarna
	D. Angelov 14'	Report	Yosifov 88'	Stadium: Kavarna Stadium; Attendance: 100

28 September 2024 11	Belasitsa Petrich	0–1	Fratria	Petrich
		Report	D. Angelov 36'	Stadium: Stadion Tsar Samuil; Attendance: 500

5 October 2024 12	Fratria	1–1	Strumska Slava	Albena
	S. Dobrev 67'		Georgiev (pen.), 26'	Stadium: Albena 1 Stadium; Attendance: 100; Referee: Petar Asparuhov

19 October 2024 13	Botev Plovdiv II	2–2	Fratria	Plovdiv
	Piloyan 37' 42'		D. Angelov 57' Lisak 85'	Stadium: Nikola Shterev - Starika Sports Complex; Attendance: 50; Referee: Stefan Gurkov

26 October 2024 14	Fratria	3–1	Etar	Albena
	A. Angelov 50' D. Angelov 54' 89'	Report	Lutumba-Pitah 64'	Stadium: Albena 1 Stadium; Attendance: 100; Referee: Boris Popov

2 November 2024 15	Marek Dupnitsa	1–0	Fratria	Dupnitsa
	Kaymakanski 55'	Report		Stadium: Stadion Bonchuk; Attendance: 200

9 November 2024 16	Fratria	2–1	Lokomotiv Gorna Oryahovitsa	Albena
	Lazarov 56'	Report	Dechev 23' Kolev 64'	Stadium: Albena 1 Stadium

16 November 2024 17	CSKA 1948 II	1–0	Fratria	Sofia
	Marijanovic 56'	Report		Stadium: Arena Tsarsko Selo; Attendance: 50; Referee: Hristo Minchev

23 November 2024 18	Fratria	0–4	Dunav Ruse	Albena
		Report	Bemanga 7' 33' Hadzhiev 15' Pahama 51'	Stadium: Albena 1 Stadium; Attendance: 200; Referee: Petar Nikolov

30 November 2024 19	OFC Lovech	0–2	Fratria	Lovech
		Report	Lazarov 5' Druiventak 19'	Stadium: Gradski stadion Attendance: 50; Referee: Valentin Stefanov

4 December 2024 20	Dobrudzha Dobrich	2–0	Fratria	Dobrich
	Mihaylov 13' A. Ivanov 32'	Report		Stadium: Stadion Druzhba; Referee: Vladimir Kirilov

7 December 2024 21	Fratria	2–0	Sportist Svoge	Albena
	Lazarov 24' Druiventak 27'			Stadium: Albena 1 Stadium; Referee: Georgi Ivanov

15 February 2025 22	Pirin Blagoevgrad	0–0	Fratria	Blagoevgrad
				Stadium: Stadion Hristo Botev

22 February 2025 23	CSKA Sofia II	4–1	Fratria	Sofia
	Bornosuzov 3' 15' Panayotov 19' Viktor Vasilev 90+4'		Voykov 85'	Stadium: PFC CSKA Sofia Sports Complex

1 March 2025 24	Fratria	0–2	Spartak Pleven	Albena
15:30 EET	Aleksandar Angelov (yellow card) 23'; Dylan Junior Abé (yellow card) 83'; Lazarov (yellow card) 85'	sofascore	Dimitar Kalchev (yellow card) 18'; Varbanov (yellow card) 53'; Rusi Chernakov 56'; Pehlivanov 63'	Stadium: Albena 1 Stadium

8 March 2025 25	Nesebar	3–1	Fratria	Nesebar
15:30 EET	Nikola Gelin 30' (yellow card) 41'; Kostov (yellow card) 64'; Nikolay Georgiev Drosev 66'; Viktor Yanev (yellow card) 69'; Alexander Petrov 85'	Report	Dobrev (yellow card) 16'; Kapitanov 55'; Bitlan (yellow card) 65'; Dylan Junior Abé (yellow card) 71'	Stadium: Stadion Nesebar; Referee: (Bulgaria) Ivaylo Nenkov

16 March 2025 26	Fratria	2–2	Ludogorets Razgrad II	Albena
15:30 EET	Xavello Druiventak 10' 32'; Kapitanov (yellow card) 34'; Minkov (yellow card) 72'	Report	Gigov 29' 51'; Nikolov (yellow card) 69'	Stadium: Albena 1 Stadium; Referee: (Bulgaria) Stanislav Apostolov

22 March 2025 27	Montana	0–1	Fratria	Montana
15:30 EET	Yulian Veskov (yellow card) 51'	Report	Xavello Druiventak 50'; Kapitanov (yellow card) 77'; Minkov (yellow card) 81' (yellow-red card) 90'; Mostovei (yellow card) 90+4'	Stadium: Stadion Ogosta; Referee: (Bulgaria) Nikolay Zapryanov

29 March 2025 28	Fratria	1–3	Yantra Gabrovo	Albena
15:30 EET	Kostadinov (yellow card) 31'; Ibryam (yellow card) 31' (goal) 77'; Dobrev (yellow card) 57'	Report	Angelov 8' 45'; Radev (yellow card) 31'; Babaliev (yellow card) 45+1'; Petar Kazakov (yellow card) 80'; Emil Kolev 83' (yellow card) 90+1'	Stadium: Albena 1 Stadium

2 April 2025 29	Minyor Pernik	0–2	Fratria	Pernik
17:00 EET	Yordanov (yellow card) 60'	Report	Lazarov 12' 44'; Maksim Marinov (yellow card) 29'	Stadium: Stadion Minyor

9 April 2025 30	Fratria	5–1	Belasitsa Petrich	Albena
17:00 EET	Dobrev 15'; Kostadinov 27' 47'; Lazarov 43'; Xavello Druiventak 49'	Report	Sadik 10' (yellow card) 77'	Stadium: Albena 1 Stadium

13 April 2025 31	Strumska Slava	2–2	Fratria	Radomir
17:00 EET	Dobrev 59' (o.g.); Valentin Dotsev (yellow card) 67'; Yanev 76'; Martin Stanchev (yellow card) 90+4'; Martin Kostov (yellow card) 90+6'	Report	Aleksandar Angelov (yellow card) 22'; Lazarov 49'; Maksim Marinov (yellow card) 57'; Minkov (yellow card) 61'; Bettinger (yellow card) 76'; Kapitanov 90+4' (pen.)	Stadium: Hristo Radovanov Stadium

19 April 2025 32	Fratria	2–1	Botev Plovdiv II	Albena
17:00 EET	Kostadinov 25'; Kapitanov (yellow card) 48'; Aleksandar Angelov 54'; Dobrev (yellow card) 65'; Lazarov (yellow card) 70'	Report	Biser Biserov Bonev 5'; Mariyan Vangelov (yellow card) 41'; Kolev (yellow card) 77'	Stadium: Albena 1 Stadium

27 April 2025 33	Etar	1–1	Fratria	Veliko Tarnovo
17:00 EET	Ivanov 2'; Iliev (yellow card) 86'	Report	Minkov (yellow card) 20'; Lazarov 24'	Stadium: Stadion Ivaylo

3 May 2025 34	Fratria	0–1	Marek Dupnitsa	Albena
18:00 EET	Kapitanov (yellow card) 66'; Lazarov (yellow card) 75'	Report	Martin Atanasov (yellow card) 43'; Kavdanski 73'; Teodor Ivanov (yellow card) 88'	Stadium: Albena 1 Stadium

7 May 2025 35	Lokomotiv Gorna Oryahovitsa	2–1	Fratria	Gorna Oryahovitsa
18:00 EET	Georgi Kolev 18'; Minkov 58'; Tashev (yellow card) 81'	Report	Bettinger (yellow card) 26'; Lazarov (yellow card) 33'; Kapitanov 70' (pen.)	Stadium: Stadion Lokomotiv

12 May 2025 36	Fratria	4–0	CSKA 1948 II	Albena
18:00 EET	Bettinger 39'; Aleksandar Angelov (yellow card) 41'; Kapitanov 64'; Denis Kadir 69' 76'	Report	Krastev (yellow card) 15'; Kristiyan Vlaykov Velichkov (yellow card) 61'; Ivaylo Markov (yellow card) 90+2'	Stadium: Albena 1 Stadium

17 May 2025 37	Dunav Ruse	4–0	Fratria	Ruse
18:00 EET	Apostolov 3' 50'; Kristiyan Gospodinov (yellow card) 56'; Kristiyan Boychev 72'; Zhak Pehlivanov 78'; Yordan Dimitrov (yellow card) 90+1'	Report		Stadium: Gradski Stadion

24 May 2025 38	Fratria	3–0	OFC Lovech	Albena
18:00 EET	Kapitanov (yellow card) 3' (goal) 26'; Xavello Druiventak 59'; Lachezar Voykov 83'	Report		Stadium: Albena 1 Stadium

=== Bulgarian Cup ===
==== Matches ====
Win Draw Loss Fixtures

13 October 2024 Preliminary round	Botev Novi Pazar	0–2	Fratria	Novi Pazar
		Report	Andoni 62' *Nikola Totev 71'	Stadium: Gradski stadion Referee: Stanimir Todorov (Gabrovo)

14 November 2024 Round of 32	Fratria	3−3 (a.e.t.) (2−4 p)	Beroe	Albena
13:30 UTC+2	Angelov 24'; Dobrev 49'; Druiventak 71'	Report	Ceijas 12'; Algarra 33'; Salido 87'	Stadium: Stadion Albena 1 Referee: Georgi Davidov (Veliko Tarnovo)
	Penalties
	Kadir (penalty missed); Andoni (penalty scored); Ibryam (penalty missed); Dobrev (penalty scored)		(penalty missed) Algarra; (penalty scored) Pachame; (penalty scored) Ceijas; (penalty scored) Godoy; (penalty scored) Ferrer

== Statistics ==
=== Appearances and goals ===
As of match played 25 May 2025

No.	Pos	Nat	Player	Total		Second League		Bulgarian Cup	
No.	Pos	Nat	Player	Apps	Goals	Apps	Goals	Apps	Goals
1	GK	(Bulgaria) BUL	Stefan Petkov	7	0	6+1	0	0	0
3	DF	(Bulgaria) BUL	Aleksandar Angelov	37	2	36	2	1	0
4	DF	(Ukraine) UKR	Serhiy Chyzhyk	7	0	0+7	0	0	0
5	DF	(Bulgaria) BUL	Vasil Dobrev	35	1	34	1	1	0
6	DF	(Bulgaria) BUL	Kaloyan Ivanov	6	0	0+6	0	0	0
8	MF	(Bulgaria) BUL	Steliyan Dobrev	28	3	27	2	1	1
9	MF	(Bulgaria) BUL	Denis Kadir	36	2	18+16	2	1+1	0
10	FW	(Netherlands) NED	Xavello Druiventak	24	8	19+3	7	2	1
11	MF	(Bulgaria) BUL	Lachezar Voykov	16	2	5+11	2	0	0
12	GK	(Bulgaria) BUL	Andriyan Kalev	0	0	0	0	0	0
13	DF	(Bulgaria) BUL	Galin Minkov	9	0	8+1	0	0	0
15	MF	(Bulgaria) BUL	Rosen Zakaryan	4	0	0+4	0	0	0
15	MF	(Russia) RUS	Platon Bakurevich	5	0	1+4	0	0	0
16	MF	(Ukraine) UKR	Arseniy Bogdanov	1	0	0+1	0	0	0
17	DF	(Bulgaria) BUL	Martin Kostadinov	31	3	30	3	1	0
18	FW	(Bulgaria) BUL	Nikola Totev	12	1	1+10	0	0+1	1
18	MF	(Bulgaria) BUL	Denislav Hasanov	2	0	0+2	0	0	0
18	FW	(Bulgaria) BUL	Stefan Stefanov	3	0	0+3	0	0	0
19	MF	(Moldova) MDA	Vasile Bitlan	20	1	12+7	1	1	0
20	FW	(Bulgaria) BUL	Maksim Marinov	18	0	11+7	0	0	0
21	MF	(Bulgaria) BUL	Iliyan Kapitanov	32	4	29+2	4	0+1	0
22	MF	(Bulgaria) BUL	David Lukanov	12	0	9+1	0	2	0
23	DF	(Central African Republic) CAF	Mike Bettinger	12	1	9+3	1	0	0
24	DF	(Bulgaria) BUL	Ivaylo Petrov	5	0	0+4	0	1	0
26	GK	(Bulgaria) BUL	Erik Georgiev	0	0	0	0	0	0
26	MF	(Bulgaria) BUL	Preslav Petkov	1	0	0+1	0	0	0
33	GK	(Moldova) MDA	Igor Mostovei	15	0	15	0	0	0
69	MF	(France) FRA	Dylan Junior Abé	16	0	7+9	0	0	0
71	DF	(Bulgaria) BUL	Ibryam Ibryam	39	1	37	1	1+1	0
74	MF	(Russia) RUS	Mikhail Gashchuk	18	0	9+7	0	1+1	0
77	FW	(Bulgaria) BUL	Georgi Lazarov	31	9	26+3	9	2	0
Player(s) who left on loan but featured this season
Player(s) who left permanently but featured this season
2	DF	(Bulgaria) BUL	Ivaylo Popov	9	0	0+8	0	1	0
7	FW	(Bulgaria) BUL	Denislav Angelov	22	9	18+2	8	1+1	1
10	MF	(Bulgaria) BUL	Yancho Andreev	4	0	4	0	0	0
14	DF	(Bulgaria) BUL	Dimitar Burov	6	0	6	0	0	0
15	MF	(Bulgaria) BUL	Viktor Ignatov	0	0	0	0	0	0
19	DF	(Bulgaria) BUL	Nikola Borisov	5	0	2+3	0	0	0
23	MF	(Bulgaria) BUL	Emil Yanchev	7	1	7	1	0	0
30	DF	(Bulgaria) BUL	Denis Corso	5	0	3+1	0	1	0
33	GK	(Bulgaria) BUL	Georgi Kitanov	19	0	17	0	2	0
39	FW	(Ukraine) UKR	Denys Vasin	5	0	2+3	0	0	0
66	FW	(Bulgaria) BUL	Vasil Andoni	10	1	1+7	0	0+2	1
75	FW	(Ukraine) UKR	Andriy Lisak	17	1	6+9	1	1+1	0
