= Yordanov =

Yordanov (Bulgarian: Йорданов) (masculine) or Yordanova (Bulgarian: Йорданова) (feminine) popular surnames in Bulgaria. People commonly known by their family name Yordanov include:

- Ivan Yordanov, Bulgarian football player
- Ivaylo Yordanov, Bulgarian football player
- Momchil Yordanov, Bulgarian-born, British Virgin Islander football player
- Nedyalko Yordanov, Bulgarian poet
- Stoyan Yordanov, Bulgarian football player
- Valentin Yordanov, Bulgarian sport wrestler
- Viktor Yordanov, Bulgarian world class swimmer
