= Mikhail Gashchuk =

Bulgarian professional footballer

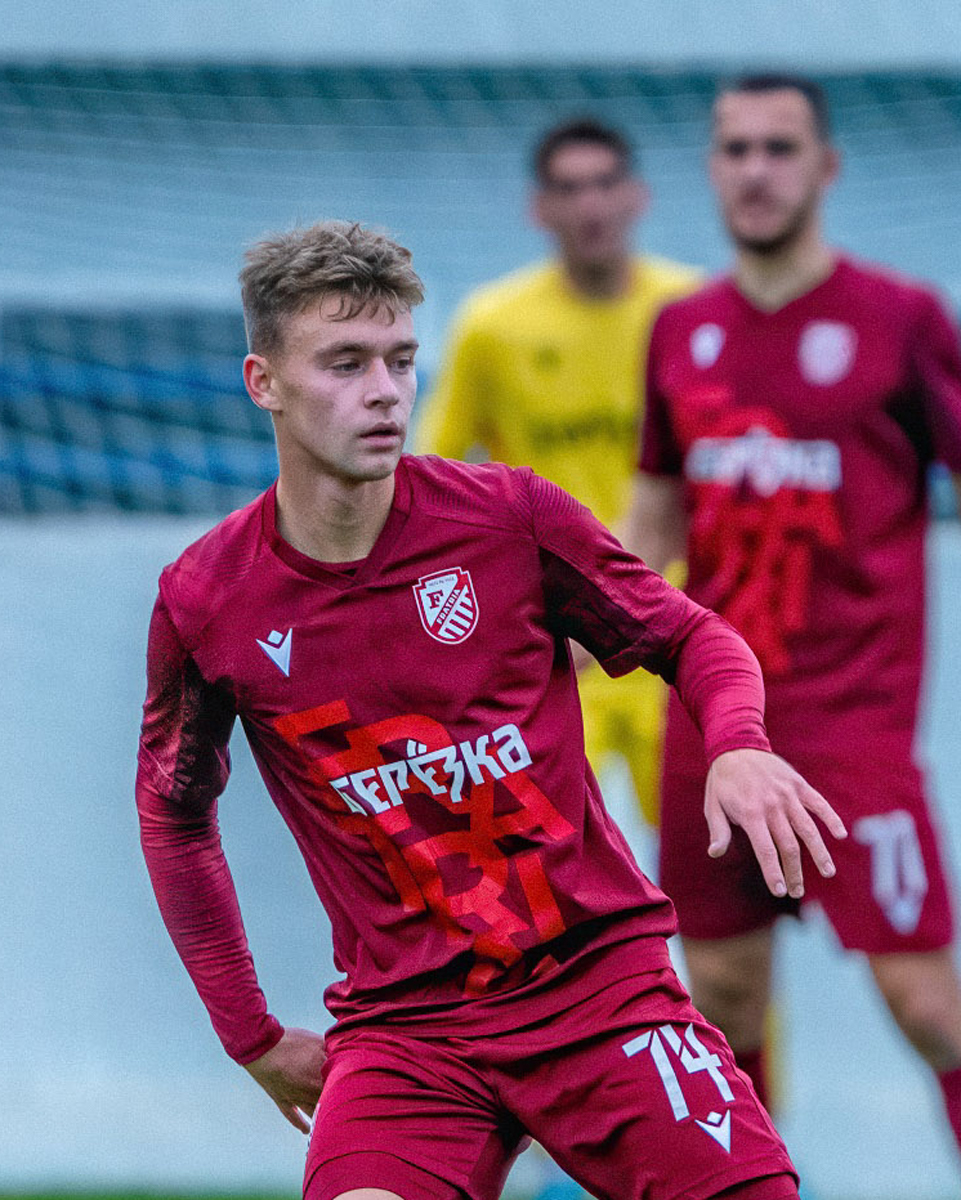
- Gashchuk playing for Fratria in 2024.

Personal information
- Full name: Mikhail Yevgenyevich Gashchuk
- Date of birth: 4 January 2007 (age 19)
- Place of birth: Tomsk, Russia
- Height: 1.76 m (5 ft 9 in)
- Position: Midfielder

Team information
- Current team: Chernomorets Balchik
- Number: 23

Youth career
- –2017: Ludogorets Razgrad
- 2017–2021: Cherno More Varna
- 2021–2022: Fratria
- 2022–2023: Botev Plovdiv

Senior career*
Years	Team	Apps	(Gls)
2023–2026	Fratria II	18	(4)
2023–2026	Fratria	25	(2)
2026	Spartak Varna II	13	(1)
2026–	Chernomorets Balchik	10	(0)
- * Club domestic league appearances and goals as of 07:57, 20 November 2026 (UTC)

Mikhail Yevgenyevich Gashchuk (Russian: Михаил Евгеньевич Гащук; born 4 January 2007) is a Russian professional footballer who plays as a midfielder for Chernomorets Balchik.

== Career ==
Born in Tomsk, Russia, Gashchuk moved at an early age to Bulgaria with his parents. He began his youth career at Ludogorets Razgrad, before moving to Cherno More Varna academy. In 2021 he joined the newly formed Fratria, where his father is one of the founders and youth coach. A year later he joined Botev Plovdiv Academy, before returning to Fratria in 2023 and joining the first team. He scored his debut goal for the team on 18 May 2023 in a league match against Riltsi Dobrich. His fully professional debut was on 14 November 2024, in a Bulgarian cup match against Beroe Stara Zagora, where Fratria were eliminated on penalties. He received an injury in Fratria's winter camp, which ruled him out for 6 months, missing the rest of 2024–25 season.

== International career ==
Gashchuk holds both Russian and Bulgarian citizenship. In August 2021, he received a call-up for Bulgaria U15 training camp.

== Career statistics ==
=== Club ===
As of 1 June 2026

Club performance			League		Cup		Continental		Other		Total	
Club	League	Season	Apps	Goals	Apps	Goals	Apps	Goals	Apps	Goals	Apps	Goals
Bulgaria			League		Bulgarian Cup		Europe		Other		Total	
Fratria II	A Regional Varna	2023–24	?	?	–		–		–		?	?
Fratria II	Third League	2024–25	5	1	–		–		–		5	1
Fratria II	Third League	2025–26	13	3	–		–		–		13	3
Fratria II	Total		18	4	0	0	0	0	0	0	18	4
Fratria	Third League	2023–24	8	2	1	0	–		–		9	2
Fratria	Second League	2024–25	16	0	2	0	–		–		18	0
Fratria	Second League	2025–26	1	0	0	0	–		–		1	0
Fratria	Total		25	2	3	0	0	0	0	0	28	2
Spartak Varna II	Third League	2025–26	13	1	–		–		–		13	1
Career statistics			56	7	3	0	0	0	0	0	59	7

== Honours ==
=== Club ===
Fratria

- Cup of Bulgarian Amateur Football League: 2024
