= Ibryam Ibryam =

Bulgarian footballer

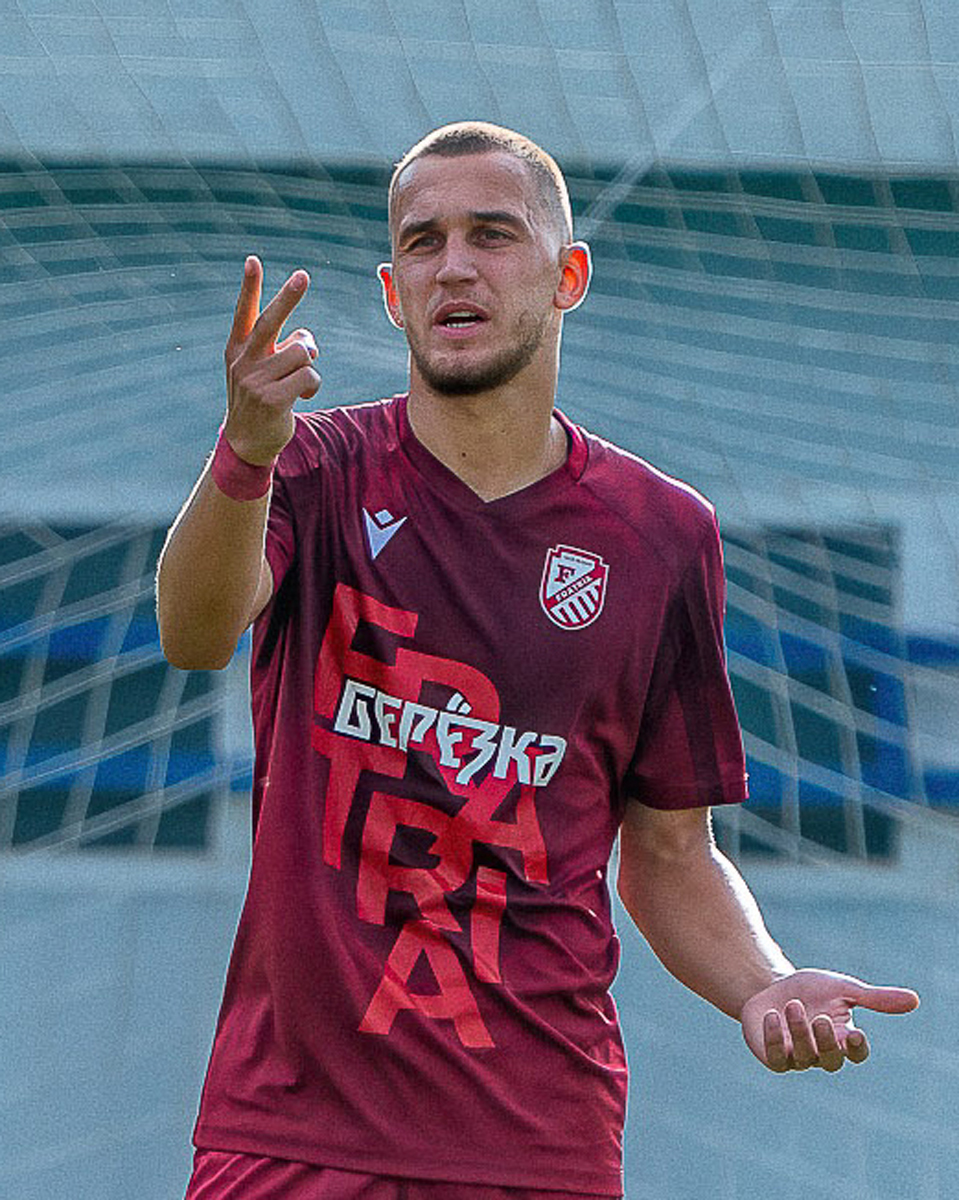
- Ibryam while playing for Fratria in 2024.

Personal information
- Full name: Ibryam Ibrahim Ibryam
- Date of birth: 12 January 2001 (age 25)
- Place of birth: Dulovo, Bulgaria
- Height: 1.90 m (6 ft 3 in)
- Position: Left-back

Team information
- Current team: Fratria
- Number: 71

Youth career
- Dorostol Silistra
- Spartak Varna

Senior career*
| Years | Team | Apps | (Gls) |
| 2020–2022 | Spartak Varna | 53 | (1) |
| 2022 | Spartak Varna II | 8 | (0) |
| 2023 | Dobrudzha | 16 | (0) |
| 2023– | Fratria | 82 | (4) |
- * Club domestic league appearances and goals as of 07:38, 20 November 2026 (UTC) ‡ National team caps and goals as of 5 March 2023

Ibryam Ibryam (Bulgarian: Ибрям Ибрям; born 12 January 2001) is a Bulgarian footballer who plays as a defender for Fratria.

== Career ==
Ibryam is a youth player of Spartak Varna, moving to the first team in 2020. On 22 July 2022 he completed his First League against Pirin, helping his team to secure the first point in the league.

== Career statistics ==
=== Club ===
As of 25 May 2025

| Club performance | | | League | | Cup | | Continental | | Other | | Total | |
| Club | League | Season | Apps | Goals | Apps | Goals | Apps | Goals | Apps | Goals | Apps | Goals |
| Bulgaria | | | League | | Bulgarian Cup | | Europe | | Other (Note: Includes Bulgarian Supercup matches.) | | Total | |
|---|---|---|---|---|---|---|---|---|---|---|---|---|
| Spartak Varna | Second League | 2019–20 | 0 | 0 | 0 | 0 | – | | – | | 0 | 0 |
| Spartak Varna | Third League | 2020–21 | 26 | 1 | 1 | 0 | – | | – | | 27 | 1 |
| Spartak Varna | Second League | 2021–22 | 21 | 0 | 2 | 0 | – | | – | | 23 | 0 |
| Spartak Varna | First League | 2022–23 | 6 | 0 | 0 | 0 | – | | – | | 1 | 0 |
| Spartak Varna | Total | | 53 | 1 | 3 | 0 | 0 | 0 | 0 | 0 | 56 | 1 |
| Spartak Varna II | Third League | 2022–23 | 8 | 0 | 0 | 0 | – | | – | | 8 | 0 |
| Dobrudzha | Second League | 2022–23 | 16 | 0 | 0 | 0 | – | | – | | 16 | 0 |
| Fratria | Third League | 2023–24 | 24 | 3 | 1 | 0 | – | | 0 | 0 | 25 | 3 |
| Fratria | Second League | 2024–25 | 37 | 1 | 2 | 0 | – | | 0 | 0 | 39 | 0 |
| Fratria | Second League | 2025–26 | 17 | 0 | 2 | 0 | – | | 0 | 0 | 19 | 0 |
| Fratria | Total | | 79 | 4 | 5 | 0 | 0 | 0 | 0 | 0 | 84 | 4 |
| Career statistics | | | 155 | 5 | 8 | 0 | 0 | 0 | 0 | 0 | 163 | 5 |
