= Georgi Lazarov =

Bulgarian footballer (born 2004)

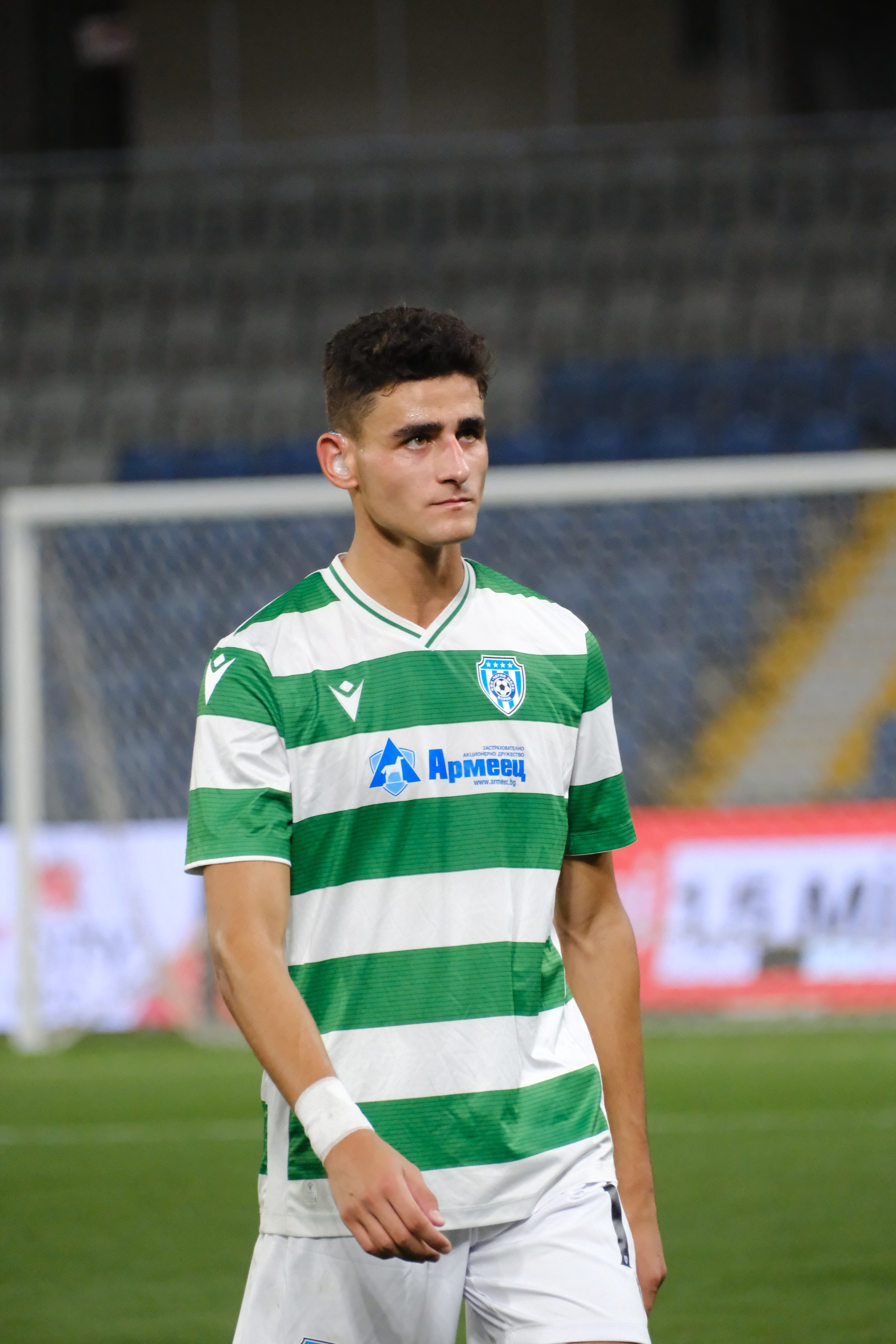
- Lazarov with Cherno More in 2025

Personal information
- Full name: Georgi Antoanov Lazarov
- Date of birth: 5 October 2004 (age 22)
- Place of birth: Plovdiv, Bulgaria
- Height: 1.87 m (6 ft 2 in)
- Position: Forward

Team information
- Current team: Cherno More
- Number: 19

Youth career
- 2012–2019: Botev Plovdiv
- 2019–2020: Spartak Plovdiv

Senior career*
Years	Team	Apps	(Gls)
2020–2024	Spartak Plovdiv	108	(86)
2024–2025	Fratria	29	(8)
2025–	Cherno More	46	(11)

International career^{‡}
2025–2026	Bulgaria U21	9	(3)
2026–	Bulgaria	2	(0)
- * Club domestic league appearances and goals as of 22:31, 10 November 2026 (UTC) ‡ National team caps and goals as of 20:13, 16 November 2026 (UTC)

Georgi Antoanov Lazarov (Bulgarian: Георги Антоанов Лазаров; born 5 October 2004) is a Bulgarian professional footballer who plays as a forward for Bulgarian First League club Cherno More Varna and the Bulgaria national team.

Lazarov spent his youth career at Botev Plovdiv and Spartak Plovdiv. He started his senior career at the age of 16 with Spartak in the Bulgarian Third League. In 2024, he joined Bulgarian Second League club Fratria before signing for Cherno More in June 2025.

== Career ==
=== Spartak Plovdiv ===
Lazarov started his career at Botev Plovdiv at age of 7, where he was initially a goalkeeper before being moved to an outfield player. He would later leave the academy after 8 years, spending 6 months in a football academy near Milan, Italy. After he returned from Italy, he joined Spartak Plovdiv. On 18 November 2020, he made his first-team debut at the age of 16 and scored his first goal in a 2–0 win against Borislav Parvomay. He become a leading goalscorer of the team and also a captain at the age of 17.

=== Fratria ===
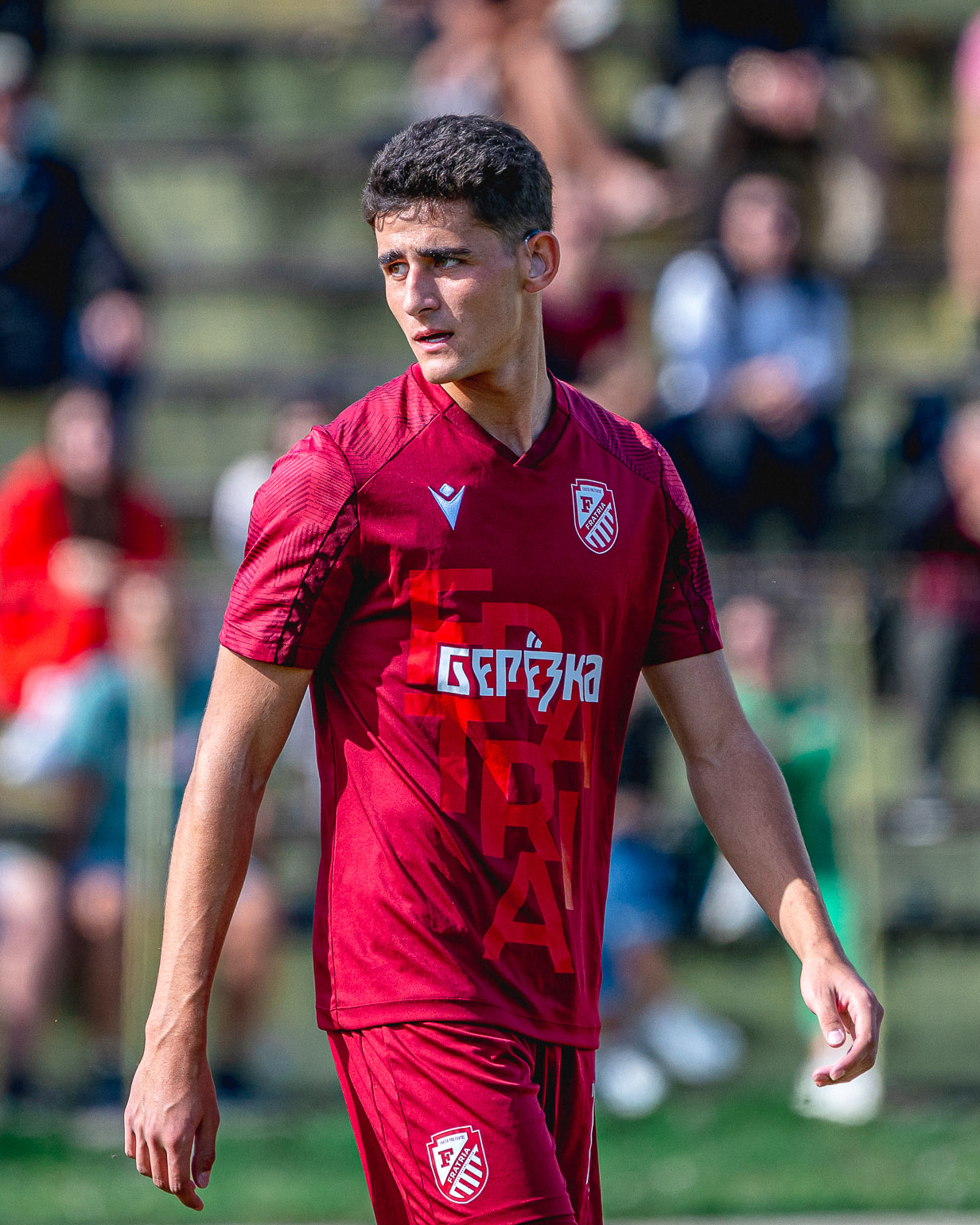
Lazarov while playing for Fratria in 2024

On 8 June 2024, Lazarov announced his departure from Spartak to move to Second League club Fratria Varna. He did not have the best start to his season, as he missed 6 of the first 9 matches due to an injury he received in the second round. He scored his first goal for the club on 11 November 2024 in a league match against Lokomotiv Gorna Oryahovitsa. He would go on to become the top goalscorer for the team in his first season with 8 goals in the league.

=== Cherno More ===
On 9 June 2025, Lazarov signed a contract with Cherno More Varna. He completed his First League debut on 18 July 2025 in a match against Lokomotiv Sofia. Six days later, he made his European debut, playing in the 2025-26 UEFA Conference League qualifiers in a match against İstanbul Başakşehir. On 27 July 2025, he secured Cherno More's first league win of the season by scoring both goals in a 2–1 win over Botev Plovdiv. On 16 August, he was named as the man of the match in the local derby against Spartak Varna, which Cherno More won 3–1 with Lazarov scoring one of the goals.

== International career ==
Lazarov received his first call-up for Bulgaria U21 in August 2025, after a perfect start of the season with Cherno More. On 5 September 2025, he scored a brace on his debut for Bulgaria U21 in a 2027 UEFA European Under-21 Championship qualification match against Gibraltar U21, in which Bulgaria won 3–0.

In November 2026, Lazarov was called up to the Bulgaria senior squad for the first time for upcoming UEFA Nations League fixtures against Iceland and Estonia. The 22-year-old made his senior debut on 13 November as a second-half substitute in a 5–0 home loss against Iceland.

== Personal life ==
Lazarov wears hearing aids as he has suffered from hearing loss since he was two years old. when he contracted smallpox. On 22 March 2026, during the Bulgarian Footballer of the Year ceremony, he received the special award "Lion Heart Trifon Ivanov" for his inspirational story.

== Career statistics ==
=== Club ===
As of match played 7 November 2026

Appearances and goals by club, season and competition
Club	Season	League			Bulgarian Cup		Continental		Other		Total	
Club	Season	Division	Apps	Goals	Apps	Goals	Apps	Goals	Apps	Goals	Apps	Goals
Spartak Plovdiv	2020–21	Third League	17	3	0	0	—		—		17	3
Spartak Plovdiv	2021–22	A Regional	24	32	0	0	—		1 (Note: Appearances in Third League playoff)	3	25	35
Spartak Plovdiv	2022–23	Third League	35	23	0	0	—		—		35	23
Spartak Plovdiv	2023–24	Third League	32	28	0	0	—		—		32	28
Spartak Plovdiv	Total		108	86	0	0	—		1	3	109	89
Fratria	2024–25	Second League	29	8	2	0	—		—		31	8
Cherno More	2025–26	First League	34	8	2	0	2 (Note: Appearances in UEFA Conference League)	0	—		38	8
Cherno More	2026–27	First League	12	3	1	1	—		—		13	4
Cherno More	Total		46	11	3	1	2	0	—		51	12
Career total			183	105	5	1	2	0	1	3	191	109

=== International ===
As of match played 16 November 2026

Appearances and goals by national team and year
National team	Year	Apps	Goals
Bulgaria
Bulgaria	2026	2	0
Total		2	0
