= Mike Bettinger =

French-Central African Republic footballer (born 2004)

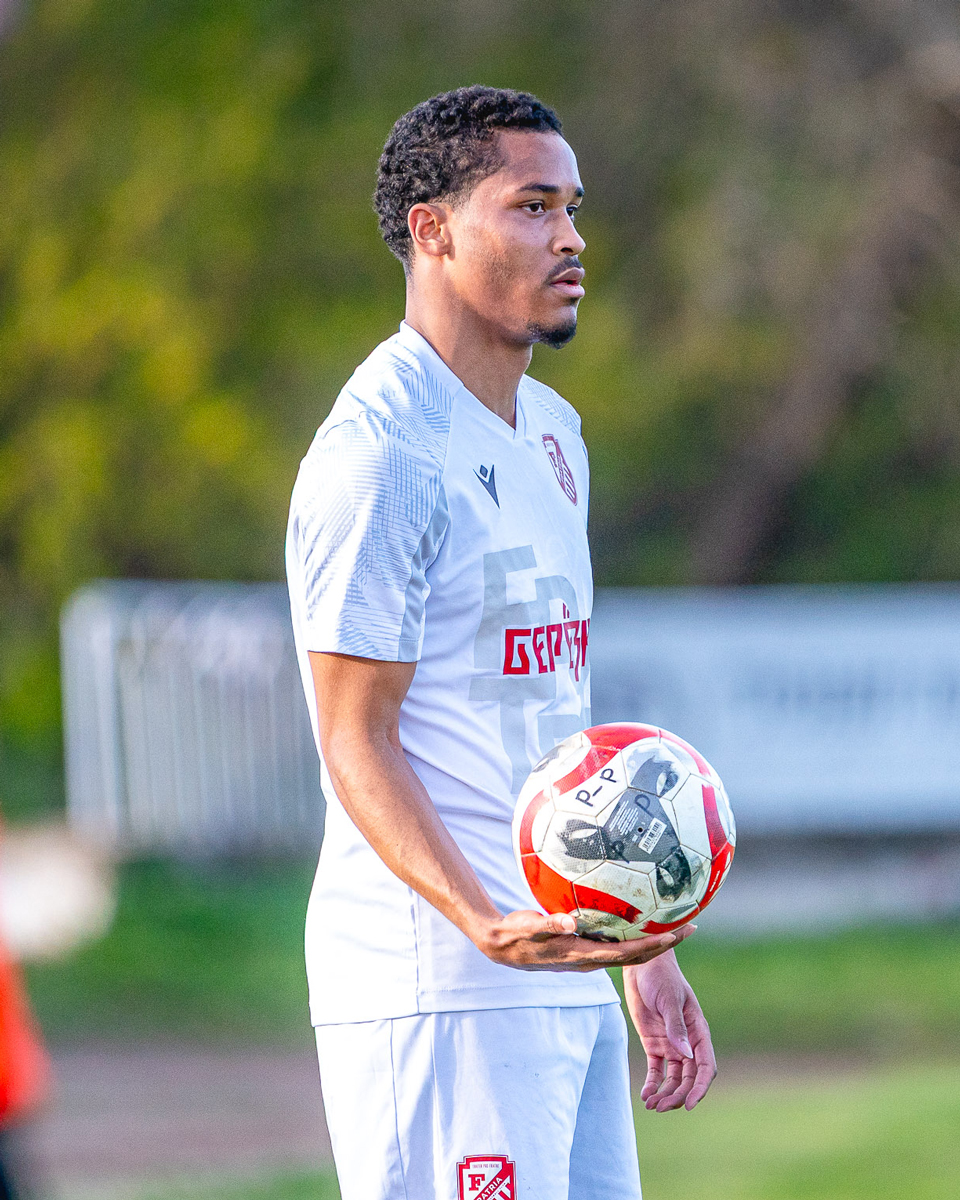
- Bettinger while playing for Fratria in 2025.

Personal information
- Full name: Mike Bradley Jefferson Bettinger
- Date of birth: 28 January 2004 (age 22)
- Place of birth: Bourg-la-Reine, France
- Height: 1.82 m (6 ft 0 in)
- Position: Defender

Team information
- Current team: Olympic Charleroi
- Number: 23

Youth career
- 2014–2019: Metz
- 2019–2022: Standard Liège

Senior career*
Years	Team	Apps	(Gls)
2022–2024	Le Mans II	10	(0)
2025	Fratria	12	(1)
2026–	Olympic Charleroi	8	(0)

International career
2025–	Central African Republic	1	(0)
- * Club domestic league appearances and goals as of 20 April 2026

Mike Bradley Jefferson Bettinger (born 28 January 2004) is a professional footballer who plays as a defender for Olympic Charleroi and represents the Central African Republic on international level.

== Career ==
Bettinger began his youth career at Metz, before moving to Belgium and joining Standard Liège. In 2022, he returned to France and joined Le Mans. In January 2025, after a trial, he joined Bulgarian Second League team Fratria. He scored his first league goal for the club on 12 May 2025 in a match against CSKA 1948 II.

== International career ==
Born in France, Bettinger holds both French and Central African Republic citizenship, due to his CAR roots. In May 2025, he received his first call-up for the Central African Republic for the friendly matches against Mauritania and Sudan on 6 and 9 June. He made his international debut for the team in the match against Mauritania, coming as a substitute in the 74th minute.

== Career statistics ==
As of 9 June 2025

Appearances and goals by club, season and competition
Club	Season	League			Cup		Europe		Other		Total	
Club	Season	Division	Apps	Goals	Apps	Goals	Apps	Goals	Apps	Goals	Apps	Goals
Le Mans II	2022–23	National 3	10	0	0	0	—		3	1	13	1
Le Mans II	2023–24	National 3	0	0	0	0	—		—		0	0
Le Mans II	Total		10	0	0	0	0	0	3	1	13	1
Fratria	2024–25	Second League	12	1	0	0	—		—		12	1
Fratria	Total		12	1	0	0	0	0	0	0	12	1
Career total			22	1	0	0	0	0	3	1	25	2
