= Valentin Dimitrov =

Bulgarian footballer

Personal information
- Full name: Valentin Tsvetomirov Dimitrov
- Date of birth: 13 February 2006 (age 20)
- Place of birth: Varna, Bulgaria
- Height: 1.83 m (6 ft 0 in)
- Position: Goalkeeper

Team information
- Current team: Spartak Varna
- Number: 89

Youth career
- Cherno More

Senior career*
Years	Team	Apps	(Gls)
2022–2023	Etar II	3	(0)
2023–2024	Fratria II	20	(0)
2023–2024	Fratria	0	(0)
2024–	Spartak Varna II	41	(0)
2025–	Spartak Varna	1	(0)
- * Club domestic league appearances and goals as of 2 March 2026 (UTC) ‡ National team caps and goals as of 08:26, 22 November 2023 (UTC)

Valentin Dimitrov (Bulgarian: Валентин Димитров; born 13 February 2006) is a Bulgarian footballer who plays as a goalkeeper for Spartak Varna.

== Career ==
Dimitrov started his career at his local team Cherno More. In January 2022 he moved to Etar and played for the reserves. In August 2023 he returned to Varna and joined Fratria. He was chosen for captain in the second team.

In the summer of 2024 he moved to another team from Varna, Spartak. He spend the 2024–25 season with the second team. In 2025 he started being called in the first team squad. He made his professional debut for the team on 4 April 2026 in a league match against Botev Plovdiv, coming as a substitute in the 45th minute, after Maksym Kovalyov received a red card.
