= Steliyan Dobrev =

Bulgarian footballer

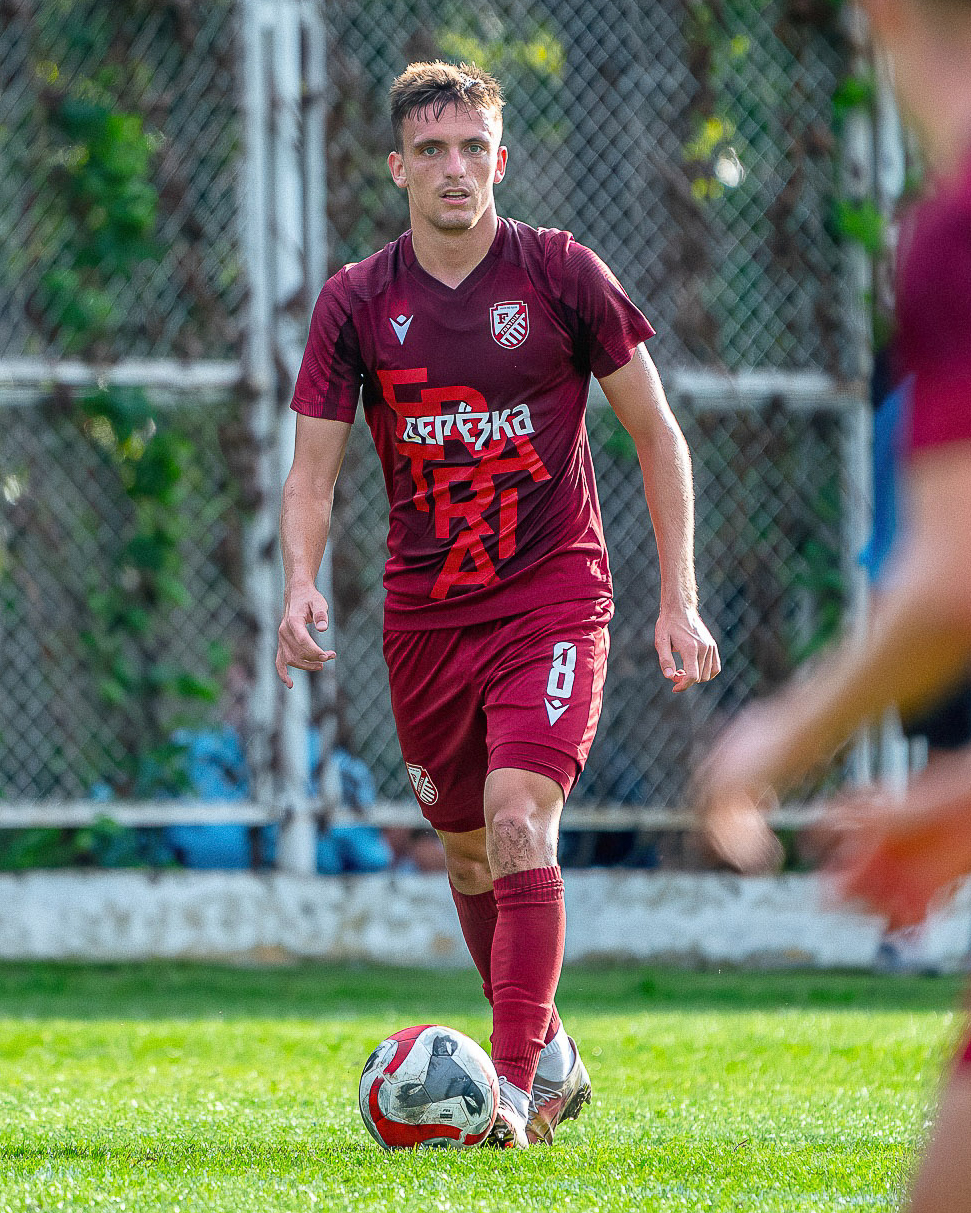

Personal information
- Full name: Steliyan Plamenov Dobrev
- Date of birth: 12 November 2003 (age 23)
- Place of birth: Sevlievo, Bulgaria
- Height: 1.78 m (5 ft 10 in)
- Position: Midfielder

Team information
- Current team: Etar
- Number: 16

Youth career
- 2010–2014: Vidima-Rakovski
- 2014–2020: Etar
- 2020–2021: Slavia Sofia

Senior career*
Years	Team	Apps	(Gls)
2019–2020	Etar	17	(1)
2021–2023	CSKA 1948 II	64	(8)
2021–2023	CSKA 1948	5	(1)
2024–2025	Fratria	39	(4)
2025	→ Sevlievo (loan)	16	(5)
2026–	Etar	18	(6)

International career
2020	Bulgaria U17		
2021–2022	Bulgaria U19	9	(1)
- * Club domestic league appearances and goals as of 03:51, 31 October 2026 (UTC)

Steliyan Plamenov Dobrev (Bulgarian: Стелиян Пламенов Добрев; born 12 November 2003) is a Bulgarian footballer who plays as a midfielder for Etar Veliko Tarnovo.

== Career ==
Dobrev made his first-team debut at 16 years old as a 79rd-minute substitute for Pedro Lagoa in a 1–1 home draw against Ludogorets Razgrad on 23 February 2020.

In June 2018, Dobrev moved from Slavia Sofia to CSKA 1948. In December 2023 he was released from the team, as he played mostly for the second team. Few days later, on 2 February 2024 he was announced as the new signing of Fratria Varna. On 30 July 2025 he was sent on loan to Sevlievo until end of season.

== Career statistics ==
=== Club ===
As of 3 April 2025

Club performance			League		Cup		Continental		Other		Total	
Club	League	Season	Apps	Goals	Apps	Goals	Apps	Goals	Apps	Goals	Apps	Goals
Bulgaria			League		Bulgarian Cup		Europe		Other		Total	
Etar	First League	2019–20	5	0	0	0	–		–		5	0
Etar	First League	2020–21	12	1	1	0	–		–		12	1
Etar	Total		17	1	1	0	0	0	0	0	18	1
CSKA 1948 II	Second League	2021–22	23	3	–		–		–		23	3
CSKA 1948 II	Second League	2022–23	24	4	–		–		–		24	4
CSKA 1948 II	Second League	2023–24	17	1	–		–		–		17	1
CSKA 1948 II	Total		64	8	0	0	0	0	0	0	64	8
CSKA 1948	First League	2021–22	5	1	0	0	–		–		5	1
CSKA 1948	First League	2022–23	0	0	0	0	0	0	–		0	0
CSKA 1948	Total		5	1	0	0	0	0	0	0	5	1
Fratria	Third League	2023–24	12	2	0	0	–		–		12	2
Fratria	Second League	2024–25	27	2	1	1	–		–		28	3
Fratria	Total		39	4	1	1	0	0	0	0	40	5
Career statistics			125	12	2	1	0	0	0	0	127	13
