= Vasil Dobrev (footballer) =

Bulgarian footballer

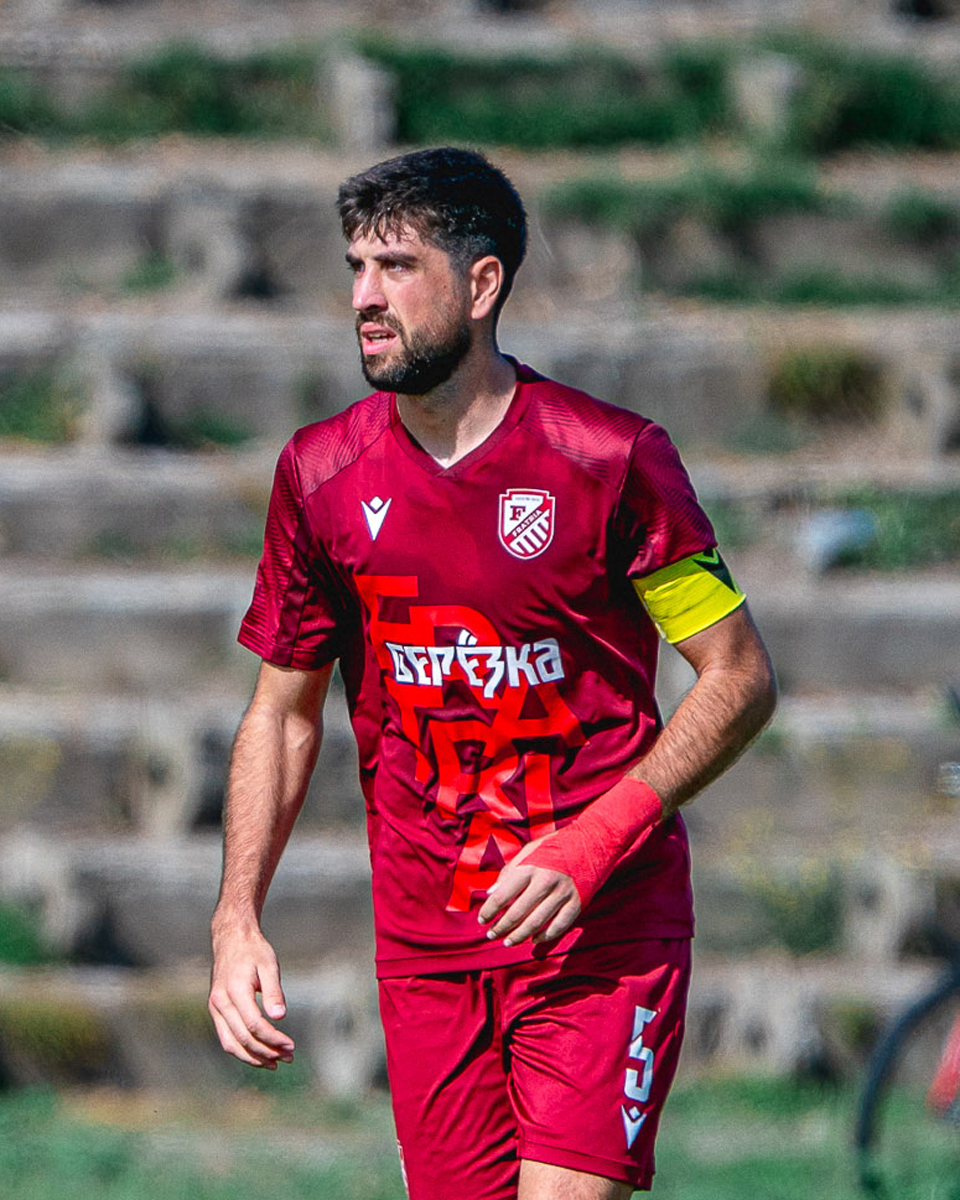
- Dobrev while playing for Fratria in 2024.

Personal information
- Full name: Vasil Nikolaev Dobrev
- Date of birth: 5 January 1998 (age 28)
- Place of birth: Burgas, Bulgaria
- Height: 1.85 m (6 ft 1 in)
- Position: Defender

Team information
- Current team: Volov Shumen
- Number: 5

Youth career
- 2010–2014: Chernomorets Burgas
- 2014–2016: Septemvri Sofia

Senior career*
Years	Team	Apps	(Gls)
2015–2019	Septemvri Sofia	58	(0)
2016	→ Pirin Razlog (loan)	8	(0)
2019	→ Arda Kardzhali (loan)	6	(1)
2019	→ Spartak Varna (loan)	8	(1)
2020	Slavia Sofia	0	(0)
2020	Botev Vratsa	6	(0)
2022–2023	Septemvri Tervel	11	(3)
2023–2025	Fratria Varna	51	(2)
2025–	Volov Shumen	16	(1)

International career^{‡}
2015–2017	Bulgaria U19	15	(0)
2019	Bulgaria U21	1	(0)
- * Club domestic league appearances and goals as of 21:42, 2 May 2026 (UTC) ‡ National team caps and goals as of 25 March 2019

Vasil Dobrev (Bulgarian: Васил Добрев; born 5 January 1998) is a Bulgarian professional footballer who plays as a defender for Volov Shumen.

== Club career ==
Dobrev made his debut for the team on 16 October 2016 in league match against Vitosha Bistritsa. He completed his professional debut in the First League on 27 August 2017 in a 4:1 win over Cherno More.

On 10 September 2019 he signed for Spartak Varna, on loan from Septemvri until end of the season. He later joined Slavia Sofia, before joining Botev Vratsa in August 2020. In December he was released from the club.

Dobrev decided to focus on his study in Medical University of Varna. On 5 October 2022, after almost 2 years break, he joined the Third League team of Septemvri Tervel. In July 2023 he moved to the ambiciuos team Fratria Varna in Third League. He became a starting regular and helped his team to promote to Second League. At the start of 2024–25 season, and after Denys Vasin retirement, he was named as the new captain of the team. On 20 June 2025 he left Fratria to join Volov Shumen in Third League.

== International career ==
=== Youth levels ===
Dobrev was called up for the Bulgaria U19 team for the 2017 European Under-19 Championship qualification from 22 to 27 March 2017. Playing in all three matches, Bulgaria qualified for the knockout phase.

== Career statistics ==
=== Club ===
As of 25 May 2025

Club performance			League		Cup		Continental		Other		Total	
Club	League	Season	Apps	Goals	Apps	Goals	Apps	Goals	Apps	Goals	Apps	Goals
Bulgaria			League		Bulgarian Cup		Europe		Other		Total	
Septemvri Sofia	V Group	2015–16	16	0	0	0	–		–		16	0
Septemvri Sofia	Second League	2016–17	9	0	1	0	–		0	0	10	0
Septemvri Sofia	First League	2017–18	22	0	0	0	–		0	0	22	0
Septemvri Sofia	First League	2018–19	11	0	1	0	–		0	0	12	0
Septemvri Sofia	Total		58	0	2	0	0	0	0	0	60	0
Pirin Razlog (loan)	B Group	2015–16	8	0	0	0	–		–		8	0
Arda Kardzhali (loan)	Second League	2018–19	6	1	0	0	–		0	0	6	1
Spartak Varna (loan)	Second League	2019–20	8	1	1	0	–		0	0	9	1
Slavia Sofia	First League	2020–21	0	0	0	0	–		0	0	0	0
Botev Vratsa	First League	2020–21	6	0	1	0	–		0	0	6	0
Septemvri Tervel	Third League	2022–23	12	3	0	0	–		0	0	12	3
Fratria	Third League	2023–24	17	1	0	0	–		0	0	17	1
Fratria	Second League	2024–25	34	1	1	0	–		0	0	35	1
Fratria	Total		51	2	1	0	0	0	0	0	52	2
Career statistics			133	7	5	0	0	0	0	0	138	7
