= Aleksandar Angelov =

Bulgarian footballer

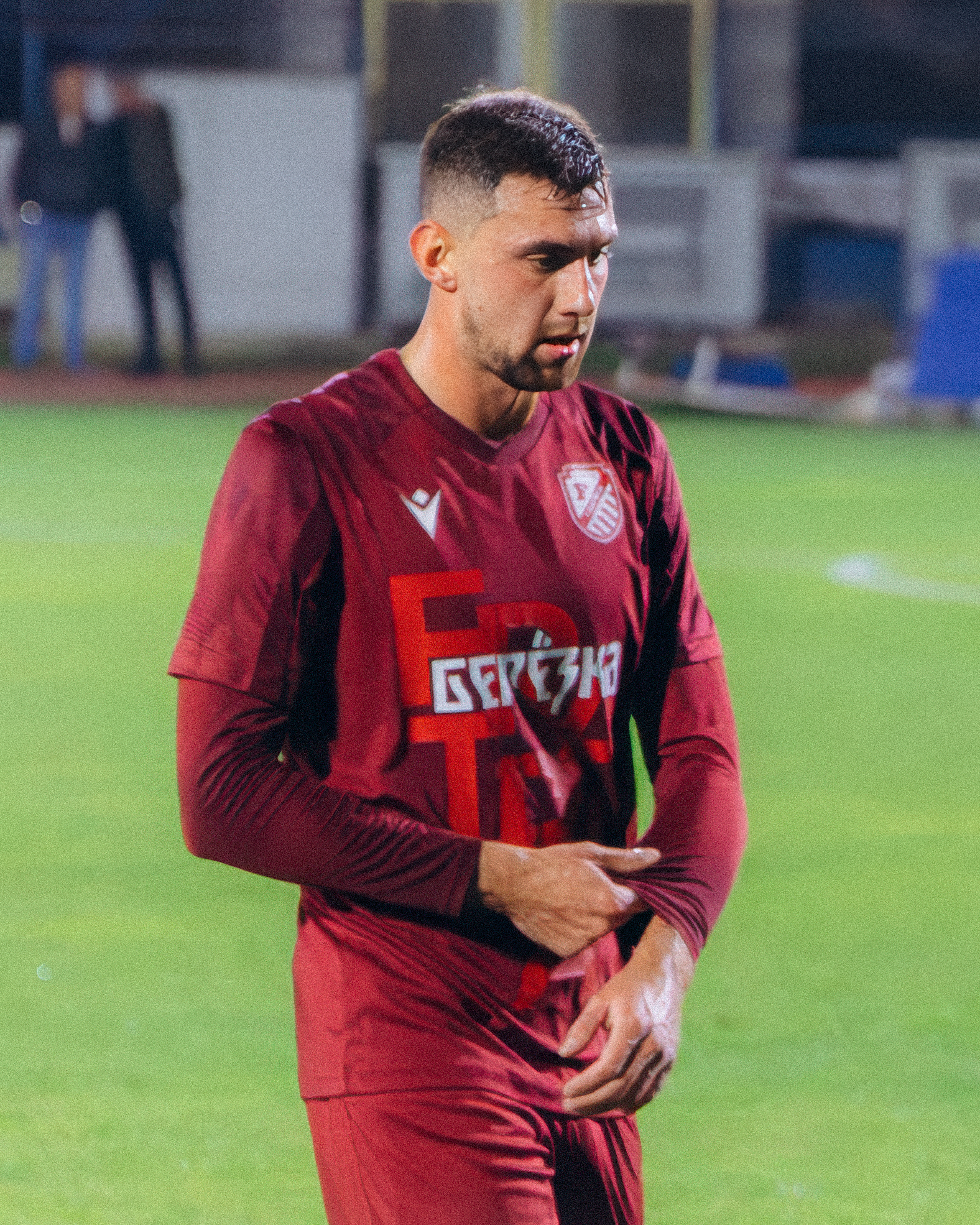
- Angelov while playing for Fratria in 2025

Personal information
- Full name: Aleksandar Ivaylov Angelov
- Date of birth: 27 May 2002 (age 24)
- Place of birth: Lovech, Bulgaria
- Height: 1.81 m (5 ft 11 in)
- Position: Defender

Team information
- Current team: Milsami Orhei
- Number: 4

Youth career
- –2020: Litex Lovech

Senior career*
Years	Team	Apps	(Gls)
2020–2024	Litex Lovech	82	(6)
2024–2026	Fratria	66	(4)
2026–	Milsami Orhei	12	(0)
- * Club domestic league appearances and goals as of 11:46, 31 October 2026 (UTC)

Aleksandar Angelov (Bulgarian: Александър Ангелов; born 27 May 2002) is a professional footballer who plays as a defender for Moldovan Liga club Milsami Orhei.

== Career ==
Angelov began his football career at local Litex Lovech Academy. He became part of the first team in the summer of 2020. In November 2023 he received an injury that ruled him out for 2 months. On 13 July 2024 he moved to newly promoted to Second League team Fratria. He was awarded for setting 100 matches in professional football on 11 November 2024. His contract with Fratria ended in June 2026 and on 19 June 2026 he was announced to join his ex manager at Fratria, Alexei Savinov, at Moldovian Milsami Orhei.

== Career statistics ==
=== Club ===
As of 25 July 2026

Club performance			League		Cup		Continental		Other		Total	
Club	League	Season	Apps	Goals	Apps	Goals	Apps	Goals	Apps	Goals	Apps	Goals
Bulgaria			League		Bulgarian Cup		Europe		Other		Total	
Litex Lovech	Second League	2020–21	4	1	0	0	–		–		4	1
Litex Lovech	Second League	2021–22	17	0	0	0	–		–		17	0
Litex Lovech	Second League	2022–23	30	2	1	0	–		–		31	2
Litex Lovech	Second League	2023–24	31	3	1	0	–		–		32	3
Litex Lovech	Total		82	5	2	0	0	0	0	0	84	5
Fratria	Second League	2024–25	36	2	1	0	–		–		37	2
Fratria	Second League	2025–26	30	2	2	0	–		–		32	2
Fratria	Total		66	4	3	0	0	0	0	0	69	4
Milsami Orhei	Moldovan Liga	2026–27	4	0	0	0	2	0	–		6	0
Career statistics			152	10	5	0	2	0	0	0	159	10
