= Vasile Bîtlan =

Moldovan footballer

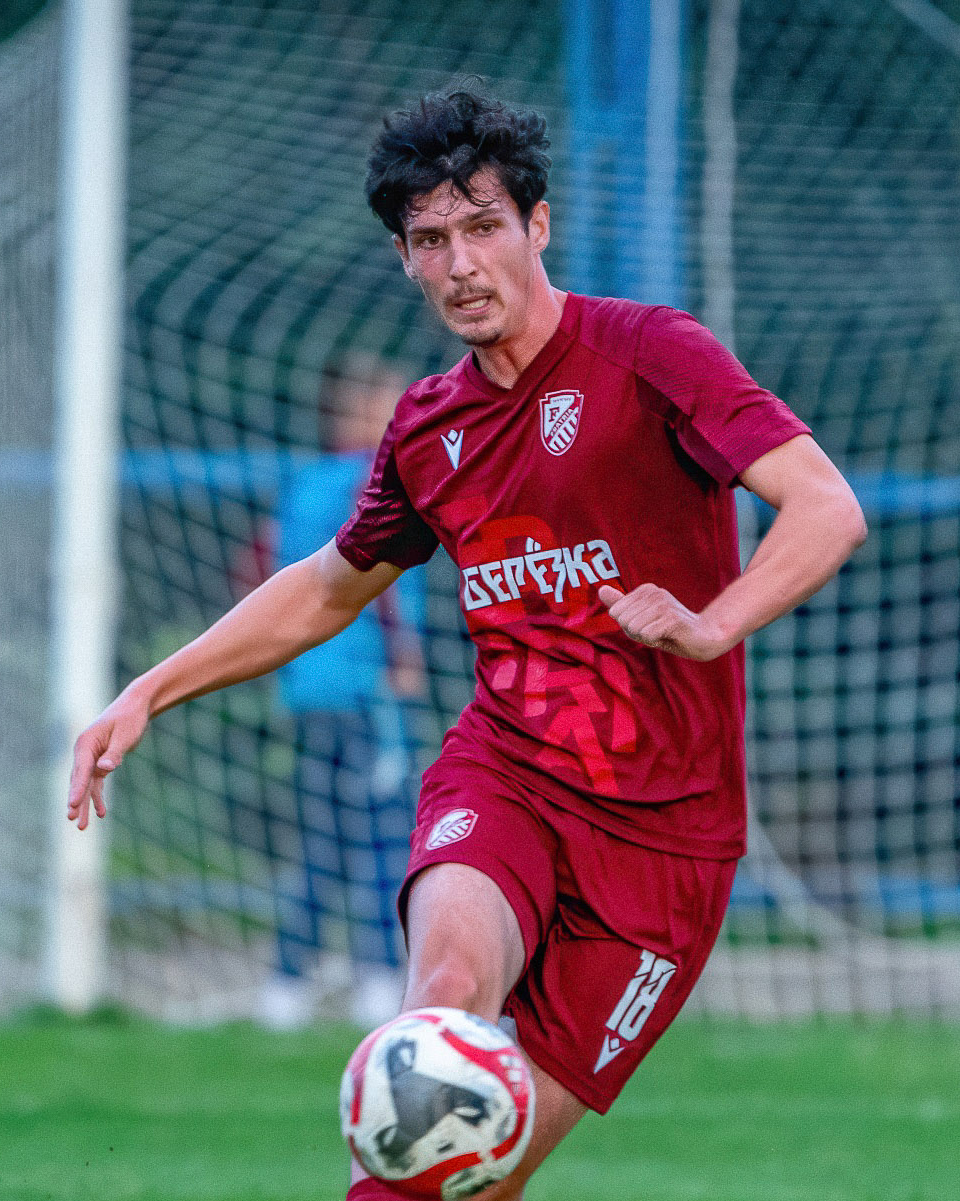
- Bîtlan playing for Fratria in 2024

Personal information
- Date of birth: 31 January 2004 (age 22)
- Place of birth: Moldova
- Position: Midfielder

Team information
- Current team: Dacia Buiucani
- Number: 8

Youth career
- Dacia Buiucani

Senior career*
Years	Team	Apps	(Gls)
2021–2024	Dacia Buiucani	44	(3)
2024–2025	Fratria	19	(1)
2026–	Dacia Buiucani	2	(0)

International career
2021–2022	Moldova U19	8	(0)
2024	Moldova U21	1	(0)
- * Club domestic league appearances and goals as of 19:51, 8 April 2026 (UTC)

Vasile Bîtlan (born 31 January 2004) is a Moldovan footballer who plays as a midfielder for Moldovan Liga club Dacia Buiucani.

== Career ==
Bîtlan started his professional career at Dacia Buiucani. On 30 November 2023 he scored his first goal in the Moldovan Cup for Dacia. On 30 August 2024 he signed with the Bulgarian Second League team Fratria.

== International career ==
In 2023 he received his first call up for Moldova U21.
