= Vasil Petrov =

Bulgarian professional football player

- Petrov captured in 2026.

Personal information
- Full name: Vasil Vladimirov Petrov
- Date of birth: 5 October 1987 (age 39)
- Place of birth: Sofia, Bulgaria
- Position: Defender

Youth career
- Slivnishki Geroy
- CSKA Sofia
- Septemvri Sofia

Senior career*
Years	Team	Apps	(Gls)
- Septemvri Sofia
- Slivnishki Geroy

Managerial career
- 2010–2015: FC Sofia 2010 (academy)
- 2015–2017: Complutense Alcala (academy)
- 2017–2020: FC Varna 2017 (academy)
- 2020–2022: Spartak Varna
- 2022–2023: Spartak Varna II
- 2023–2024: Spartak Varna
- 2024–2025: Fratria
- 2026: Spartak Varna
- * Club domestic league appearances and goals

Vasil Petrov (Bulgarian: Васил Петров; born 5 October 1987) is a Bulgarian professional football manager and former player who played as a defender. He currently works as manager.

In 2007, aged 17, Petrov started his own football academy, later registered as FC Sofia 2010 and in 2015 bought by Stoyne Manolov and transformed into Tsarsko Selo. In 2017, he started a new academy in Varna, called FC Varna 2017.

== Academy ownership ==
In March 2007, under the initiative of his father Vladimir, Petrov established a football academy in Sofia. In 2010, after three consecutive years of growth, the academy formed a men's team and registered it with the Bulgarian Football Union under the name FC Sofia 2010. In the 2014–15 season, the team was playing in third league when it was bought by Stoyne Manolov. On 28 July 2016, the team was officially merged with Tsarsko Selo; the new team joined the Bulgarian Second Professional League.

In 2017, Petrov decided to start a new academy, but this time in Varna and called it FC Varna 2017. In September 2022, FC Varna 2017 become a satellite of Spartak Varna academy, where Petrov become director month earlier.

== Managerial career ==
V. Perov (in yellow) in FC Vihur, 2013.

In August 2020, Petrov was announced as the new manager of Spartak Varna in Bulgarian Third League. The team made а peremptory run, won the 2020–21 season and returned to the Second League. The team kept up the good performances under Petrov and ended the half season in first place.

V. Perov (right), in 2015.

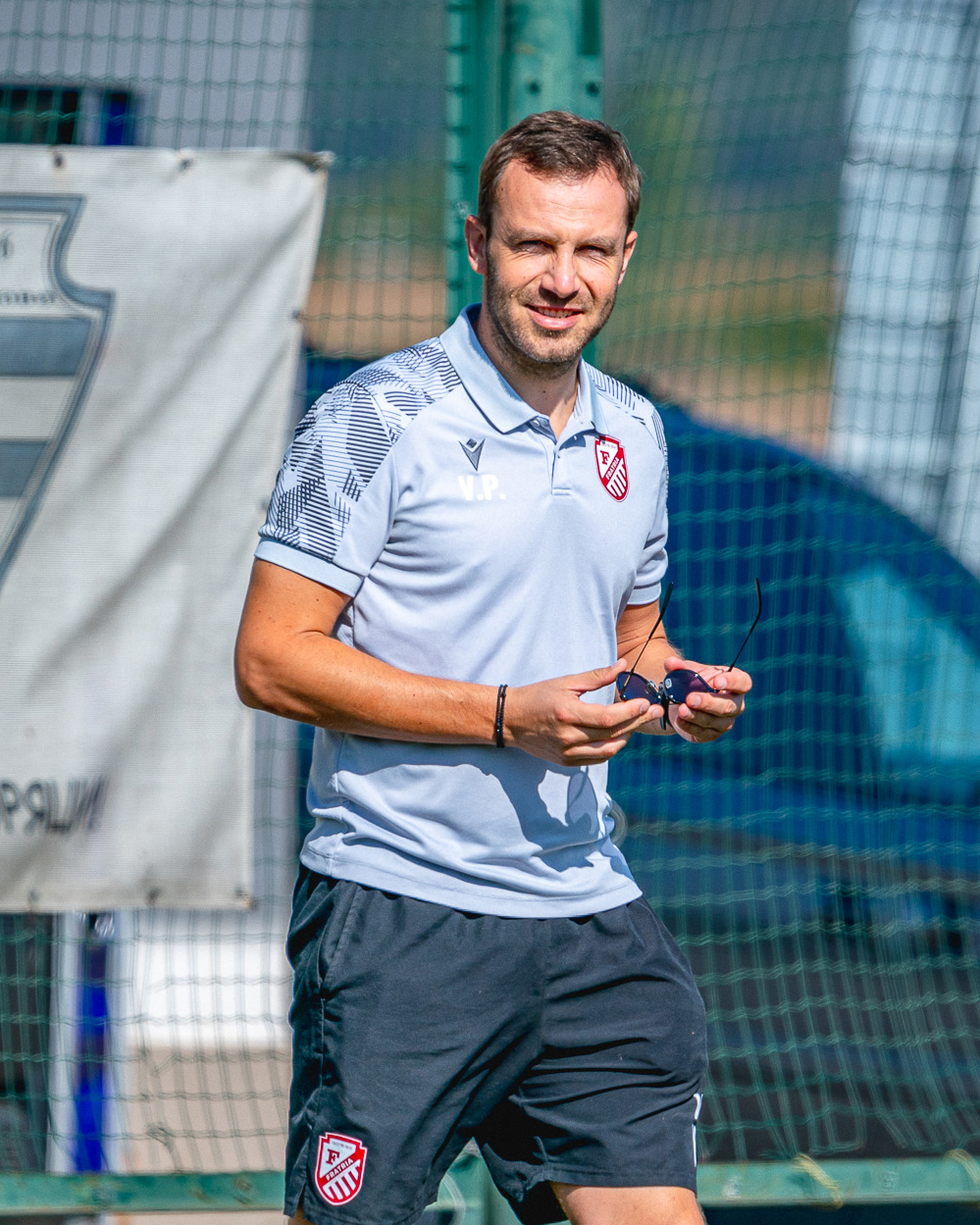
V. Perov in FC Fratria, in 2024.

On 5 May 2022, after a 2:1 home win against Sozopol he secured a top 3 place and return to the First League for the 2022–23 season, after 12 years of absence for Spartak. His team ended up on 3rd place with having the same points with first and second team in group. Petrov resigned as a manager on 11 August 2022, after his team scored just one point after the first 5 rounds in the First League. On 19 September 2022 he was announced as the new academy director of Spartak. Petrov become a manager of Spartak II on 26 October 2022. On 22 August 2023 he was once again announced as manager of Spartak main team, but this time as interim, as Valentin Iliev was released for poor results in Second League. His good results and the immediately improve of play, made a lot fans to root for full return as manager. He was announced to stay in the club in the end of December, but on 16 January he was surprisingly released from the club.

On 6 April 2024 he was announced as the new Sports Director of Fratria. On 16 November 2024, 2 days after Emanuel Lukanov was released as manager of Fratria, Petrov was announced as the new head coach of the team. Few days after the season end, on 28 May 2025, he was announced to step down from the position and become Academy Director of the club.

== Managerial statistics ==
As of 4 May 2025

Team	From	To	Record							
Team	From	To	G	W	D	L	Win %	GF	GA	GD
(Bulgaria) Spartak Varna	18 August 2020	11 August 2022	70	44	13	13	62.86	149	63	+86
(Bulgaria) Spartak Varna II	26 October 2022	16 June 2023	19	10	4	5	52.63	33	19	+14
(Bulgaria) Spartak Varna	22 August 2023	16 January 2024	16	10	2	4	62.50	35	13	+22
(Bulgaria) Fratria	16 November 2024	Present	18	6	4	8	33.33	22	27	-5
Total			123	70	23	30	56.91	239	122	+117

== Career honours ==
=== Head coach ===
Spartak Varna

Third League:

- Champions (1): 2020–21

== See also ==
- FC Sofia 2010
