= Denislav Angelov =

Bulgarian footballer

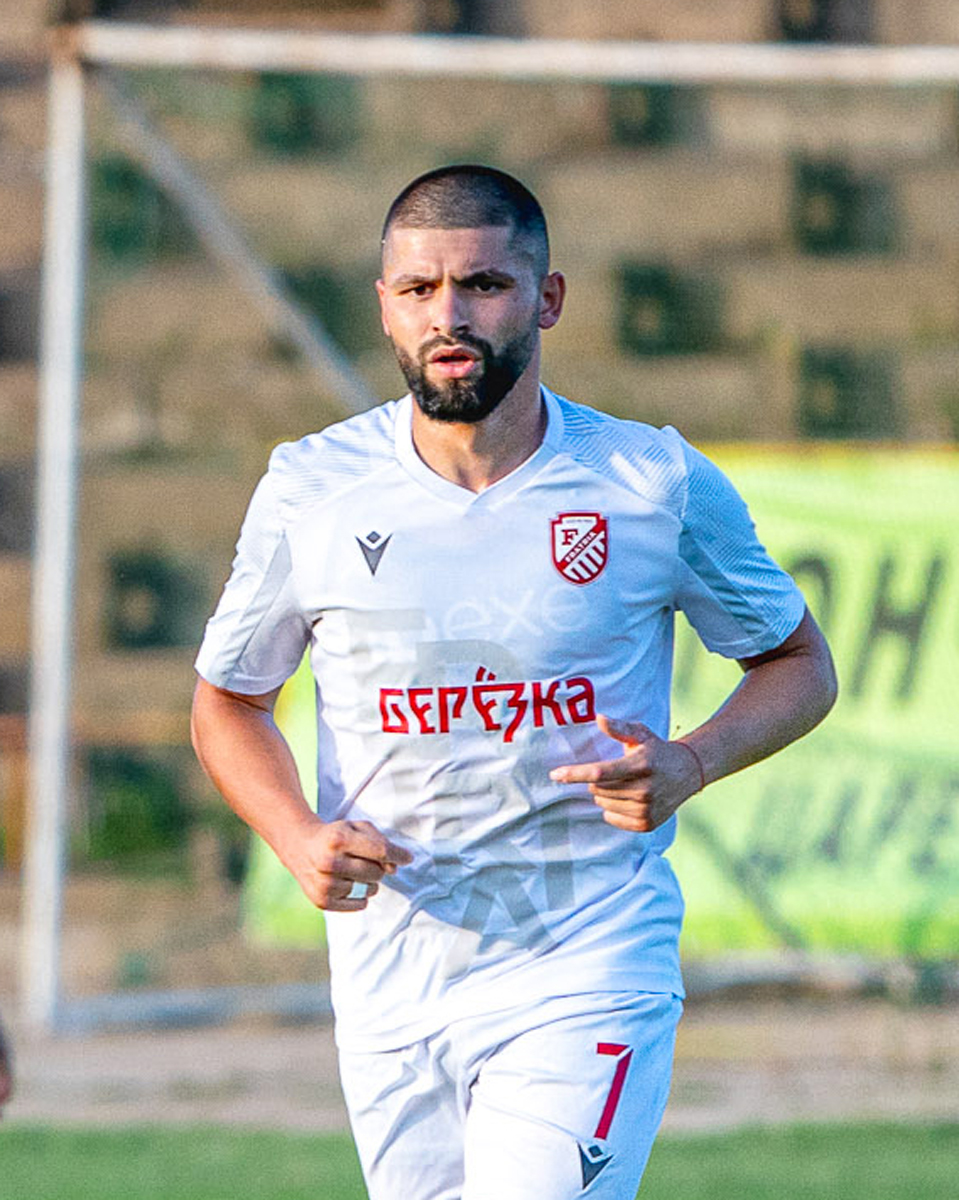
- Angelov playing for Fratria in 2024.

Personal information
- Full name: Denislav Minkov Angelov
- Date of birth: 8 June 2001 (age 25)
- Place of birth: Devnya, Bulgaria
- Height: 1.73 m (5 ft 8 in)
- Positions: Winger; forward

Team information
- Current team: Fratria
- Number: 9

Youth career
- Cherno More

Senior career*
Years	Team	Apps	(Gls)
2019–2022	Cherno More	28	(1)
2021	→ CSKA 1948 (loan)	15	(1)
2022–2023	Dobrudzha	30	(9)
2023	Etar	4	(0)
2023–2024	Eendracht Aalst	21	(7)
2024	Fratria Varna	20	(8)
2025–2026	Yantra Gabrovo	45	(26)
2026–	Fratria	12	(2)

International career^{‡}
2019	Bulgaria U18	5	(1)
2019–2020	Bulgaria U19	11	(1)
2021	Bulgaria U21	6	(0)
- * Club domestic league appearances and goals as of 11:51, 31 October 2026 (UTC) ‡ National team caps and goals as of October 2021

Denislav Minkov Angelov (Bulgarian: Денислав Минков Ангелов; born 8 June 2001) is a Bulgarian footballer who plays as a forward for Fratria.

== Career ==
Angelov made his professional debut for Cherno More on 23 August 2019 in a league match against Arda Kardzhali. He signed his first professional contract with Cherno More on 14 January 2020. In June 2023, he joined newly promoted Etar Veliko Tarnovo. Only a month later he was transferred to Eendracht Aalst. After a good season with the club, he left the club seeking return to Bulgaria.

In June 2024 he joined to the newly promoted to Second League team Fratria Varna, to work again with his youth coach from Cherno More academy, Emanuel Lukanov. He left the team on 18 February 2025 due mutual agreement, to join Yantra as a free agent. Ending the season as Yantra's to goalscorrer, on 17 June 2026 he returned to Fratria.

== Career statistics ==
=== Club ===
As of 6 September 2025

Club	League	Season	League		Cup		Continental		Total	
Club	League	Season	Apps	Goals	Apps	Goals	Apps	Goals	Apps	Goals
Cherno More	First League	2019–20	11	0	1	0	—		12	0
Cherno More	First League	2020–21	12	1	1	0	—		0	0
Cherno More	First League	2021–22	5	0	0	0	—		0	0
Cherno More	Total		28	1	2	0	0	0	30	1
CSKA 1948 (loan)	First League	2021–22	15	1	0	0	—		15	1
Dobrudzha	Second League	2022–23	30	9	0	0	—		30	9
Etar	First League	2023–24	4	0	0	0	—		4	0
Eendracht Aalst	Belgian Division 2	2023–24	21	7	0	0	—		21	7
Fratria Varna	Second League	2024–25	20	8	2	1	—		22	9
Yantra	Second League	2024–25	16	13	—		—		16	13
Yantra	Second League	2025–26	7	4	0	0	—		7	4
Yantra	Total		23	17	0	0	0	0	23	17
Career statistics			141	43	4	1	0	0	145	44

== Honours ==
Individual

- Bulgarian Second League top scorer: 2024–25 (21 goals)
