= Dimitar Burov =

Bulgarian footballer

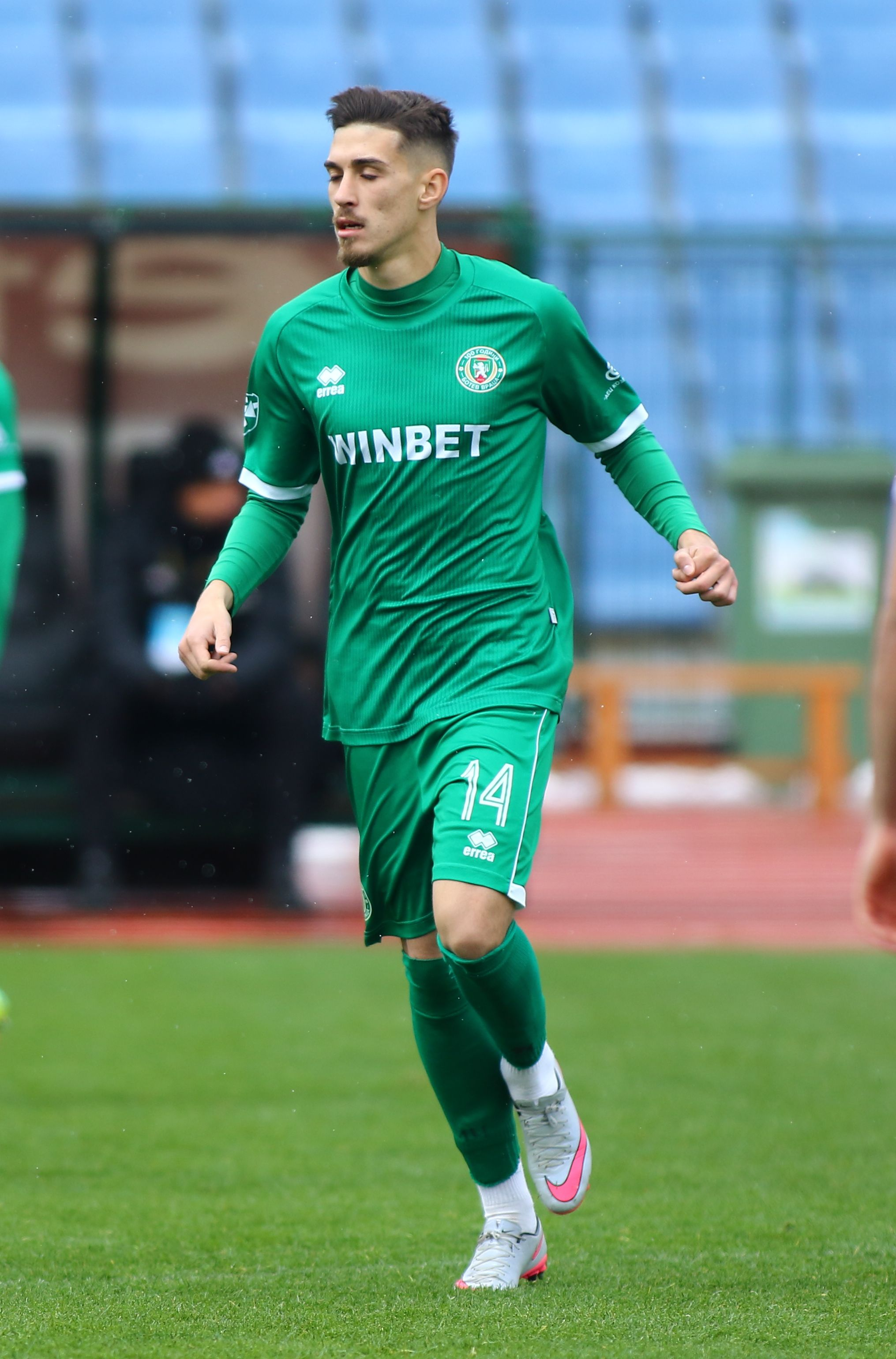

Personal information
- Full name: Dimitar Hristov Burov
- Date of birth: 31 August 1997 (age 29)
- Place of birth: Sofia, Bulgaria
- Height: 1.78 m (5 ft 10 in)
- Position: Left back

Team information
- Current team: Slavia Sofia
- Number: 26

Youth career
- 2005–2008: Levski-Rakovski
- 2008–2015: Levski Sofia
- 2015–2016: Slavia Sofia

Senior career*
Years	Team	Apps	(Gls)
2016–2019	Slavia Sofia	13	(0)
2017	→ Spartak Pleven (loan)	11	(0)
2018–2019	→ CSKA 1948 (loan)	16	(0)
2019–2020	Strumska Slava	18	(2)
2020–2021	Botev Vratsa	21	(2)
2021–2024	Montana	102	(8)
2024	Fratria	6	(0)
2024–2026	Montana	39	(2)
2026–	Slavia Sofia	8	(0)

International career^{‡}
2016	Bulgaria U19	2	(0)
- * Club domestic league appearances and goals as of 08:25, 4 November 2026 (UTC) ‡ National team caps and goals as of 17:42, 22 May 2016 (UTC)

Dimitar Hristov Burov (Bulgarian: Димитър Христов Буров; born 31 August 1997) is a Bulgarian professional footballer who plays as a left back for Slavia Sofia.

== Career ==
=== Levski Sofia ===
Burov started playing football aged eight in the Levski-Rakovski Academy. 3 years later, after showing great potential, he moved to Levski Sofia's main academy.

=== Slavia Sofia ===
Burov joined Slavia Sofia's academy in 2015 together with 3 other Levski players. On 28 May 2016 he made his debut in the A Group for Slavia in a match against Montana.

==== Loan to Spartak Pleven ====
On 6 January 2017, Burov joined Spartak Pleven on loan for the rest of the season.

== Career statistics ==
=== Club ===
As of 28 May 2017

Club performance			League		Cup		Continental		Other		Total	
Club	League	Season	Apps	Goals	Apps	Goals	Apps	Goals	Apps	Goals	Apps	Goals
Bulgaria			League		Bulgarian Cup		Europe		Other (Note: Includes Bulgarian Supercup matches.)		Total	
Slavia Sofia	A Group	2015–16	1	0	0	0	–		–		1	0
Slavia Sofia	First League	2016–17	2	0	0	0	0	0	–		2	0
Career statistics			3	0	0	0	0	0	0	0	3	0
