= Momchil Yordanov =

Bulgarian-British Virgin Islands footballer

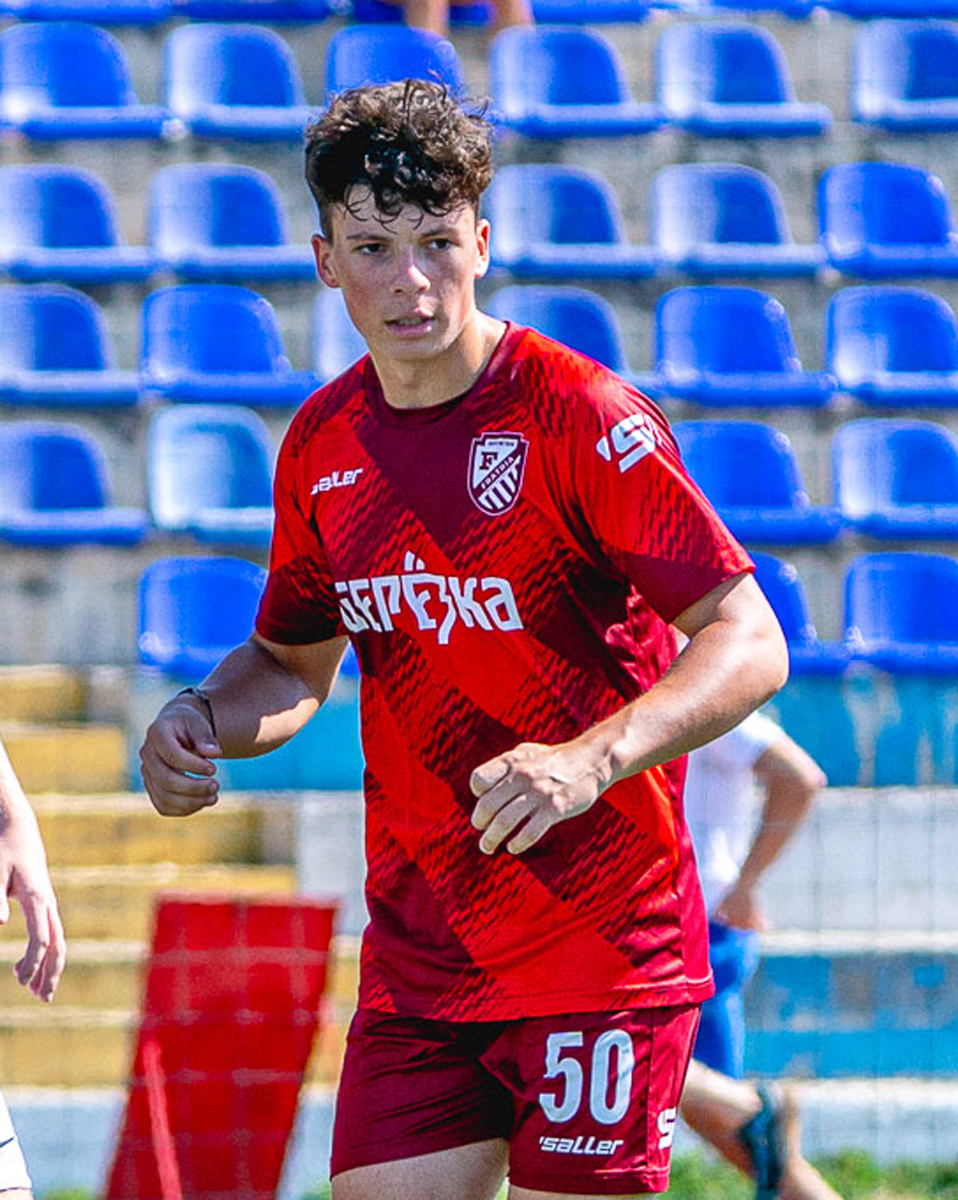
- Yordanov playing for Fratria II in 2024.

Personal information
- Full name: Momchil Hristov Yordanov
- Date of birth: 28 February 2007 (age 19)
- Place of birth: Shumen, Bulgaria
- Height: 1.86 m (6 ft 1 in)
- Position: Defender

Team information
- Current team: Akademik Svishtov
- Number: 5

Youth career
- 2021–2022: Fratria
- 2022–2023: Aston Villa
- 2023–2024: Brooke House College Football Academy
- 2024–2025: Eastbourne Borough

Senior career*
Years	Team	Apps	(Gls)
2024	Fratria II	0	(0)
2025–2026	Gulf United B	2	(0)
2026	Lancing	7	(0)
2026–	Akademik Svishtov	2	(0)

International career^{‡}
2023–	British Virgin Islands U20	10	(0)
2024–	British Virgin Islands	3	(0)
- * Club domestic league appearances and goals as of 09:13, 8 September 2026 (UTC) ‡ National team caps and goals as of 12:30, 30 May 2025 (UTC)

Momchil Hristov Yordanov (Bulgarian: Момчил Йорданов; born 28 February 2007) is a professional footballer who plays as a defender for Akademik Svishtov. Born in Bulgaria, he represents the British Virgin Islands on international level.

== Career ==
Born in Bulgaria, Yordanov spent his youth in the United Kingdom and Bulgaria with his parents. He was part of Fratria academy for the 21/22 season, before moving to Brooke House College Football Academy during the 22/23 season. He then moved onto Academia and Football Beechwood School for the 23/24 season. In July 2024 he returned to Fratria, before returning in England and joining the National League South team Eastbourne Borough in October 2024. In August 2025 he signed contract with Emirati club Gulf United.

== International career ==
Yordanov holds dual citizenship making him available for both Bulgaria and British Virgin Islands. In December 2023 he was called up for the British Virgin Islands U20 team where he made his U20 debut against St. Kitts and Nevis. In February 2024 he was again called up for the British Virgin Islands U20 where he and his team travelled to Nicaragua to play in the CONCACAF U20 Championship Qualifiers. Yordanov played every minute of the group stage.. Then, in the last game against Anguilla U20 he was given the captains armband by his coach and lead his team to a 3–1 victory . In October 2024 he was called up for British Virgin Islands for the 2024–25 CONCACAF Nations League matches against Saint Kitts and Nevis and Cayman Islands on 9 and 12 October. He completed his official debut on 12 October, coming as a substitute in the match against Cayman Islands.

== Career statistics ==
=== National team ===
As of 4 June 2025

British Virgin Islands
Year	Apps	Goals
2024	1	0
2025	2	0
Total	3	0
