= FC Spartak Varna II =

Spartak Varna II
- Full name: Spartak 1918 Varna II Football Club
- Nickname: Соколите (The Falcons)
- Founded: 1 July 2021; 5 years ago
- Ground: Lokomotiv Stadium, Varna
- Capacity: 1,000
- Chairman: Asen Milanov / Pavlin Nikolov
- Manager: Vacant
- League: Third League
- 2023–24: Third League, 6th
- Website: http://www.spartakvarna.bg/
Home colours	Away colours

Spartak II (Bulgarian: Спартак II) or Spartak 2 is a Bulgarian football team based in Varna. Founded in 2021, it is the reserve team of Spartak Varna, and currently plays in Third League, the third level of Bulgarian football.

Obliged to play one level below their main side, Spartak II is ineligible for promotion to First League and also can not compete in the Bulgarian Cup.

== History ==
Since 2015, the Bulgarian Football Union allowed Bulgarian teams to have reserve sides in the lower regional divisions. In 2021 Spartak started a reserve squad in Third League. In 2023 the team expressed desire to take the first place and promote to Second League. In 2023, Vasil Petrov was promoted to lead the first team, returning in charge of Spartak after he once managed the team to promote to First League, with Ivelin Petkov becoming the new manager of Spartak II. On 10 January 2024 Kyriakos Georgiou was announced as the new director of Spartak Academy and Spartak II manager. Day later, after a meeting between fans and the team owner, he decided to not take Georgiou, because of the huge disapproval of the fans.

== Players ==
As of 10 July 2026

Note: Flags indicate national team as defined under FIFA eligibility rules; some limited exceptions apply. Players may hold more than one non-FIFA nationality.

No.	Pos.	Nation	Player
1	GK	BUL	Yosif Slavchev
3	DF	BUL	Pavlin Petkov
4	DF	BUL	Aleksandar Trendafilov
6	DF	BUL	Aleksandar Aleksandrov
7	FW	BUL	Kaloyan Yanchev
8	MF	BUL	Kristiyan Kurbanov
9	FW	BUL	Simeon Ivanov

No.	Pos.	Nation	Player
10	MF	BUL	Denislav Stoyanov
11	FW	BUL	Dimitar Todorov
12	GK	BUL	Samuil Dechev
13	DF	BUL	Stefan Stefanov
14	MF	BUL	Nikolay Vasilev (captain)
22	DF	BUL	Stefan Stoyanov
27	MF	BUL	Nikolay Dimitrov

== Personnel ==
=== Manager history ===
Dates	Name	Honours
2021–2022	(Bulgaria) Dimitar Trendafilov	
2022–2023	(Bulgaria) Vasil Petrov	
2023	(Bulgaria) Ivelin Petkov (interim)	

=== Seasons ===
Results of league and cup competitions by season
Season	League											Top goalscorer	
Season	Division	Level	P	W	D	L	F	A	GD	Pts	Pos	Top goalscorer	
2021–22	Third League	3	26	9	6	11	40	36	+4	33	7th	(Bulgaria) Yanaki Smirnov	10
2022–23	Third League	3	28	13	5	10	44	35	+9	44	8th	(Bulgaria) Daniel Halachev	12
2023–24	Third League	3	26	16	2	8	66	27	+39	50	6th	(Bulgaria) Daniel Halachev	14
2024–25	Third League	3											

==== Key ====
- GS = Group stage
- QF = Quarter-finals
- SF = Semi-finals

Promoted	Relegated
