= 2024–25 Second Professional Football League (Bulgaria) =

69th season of the Second Professional Football League (Bulgaria)

Second Professional Football League
- Season: 2024–25
- Dates: July 2024 – June 2025
- Champions: Dobrudzha
- Promoted: Dobrudzha; Montana
- Relegated: Lovech; Strumska Slava; Botev II; Nesebar
- Matches: 380
- Goals: 868 (2.28 per match)
- Top goalscorer: Denislav Angelov (21 goals)
- Best goalkeeper: Vasil Simeonov (23 clean sheets)
- Biggest home win: Dunav 6–1 Nesebar (13 August 2024)
- Biggest away win: Botev Plovdiv II 0–5 Dunav Ruse (30 September 2024); Pirin Blagoevgrad 0–5 CSKA 1948 II (6 October 2024)
- Highest scoring: Dunav 6–1 Nesebar (13 August 2024) Spartak Pleven 2–5 Dunav (20 July 2024) Etar 2–5 CSKA 1948 II (16 September 2024)
- Longest winning run: 7 games Dobrudzha; Marek
- Longest unbeaten run: 20 games Dobrudzha
- Longest winless run: 19 games Nesebar
- Longest losing run: 6 games Botev Plovdiv II
- All statistics correct as of 16:26, 24 May 2025 (UTC).

The 2024–25 Second League is the 69th season of the Second League, the second tier of the Bulgarian football league system, and the 9th season under this name and current league structure.

This season, the league was expanded to 20 teams, including two teams relegated from First League, four teams promoted from Third League and four reserve teams from First League.

== Teams ==
The following teams have changed divisions since the 2023–24 season.

Team
Botev II
Belasitsa
Dobrudzha
Dunav
Etar
Lovech
Lokomotiv
Ludogorets II
Marek
Minyor
Montana
Nesebar
Pirin
Spartak
Sportist
Strumska Slava
Fratria
CSKA 1948 II
CSKA II
Yantra Gabrovo

=== To Second League ===
Promoted from Third League

- Lokomotiv Gorna Oryahovitsa
- Minyor Pernik
- Fratria
- Nesebar

Introduced reserve teams

- Botev Plovdiv II
- CSKA Sofia II

Relegated from First League

- Etar
- Pirin Blagoevgrad

=== From Second League ===
Relegated to Third League

- Bdin Vidin
- Maritsa Plovdiv
- Chernomorets Balchik
- Chernomorets Burgas

Promoted to First League

- Spartak Varna
- Septemvri Sofia

== Locations ==
Location of teams in 2024–25 Second League

No. of teams	Province	Team(s)
2
2	Blagoevgrad	Pirin Blagoevgrad, Belasitsa
2	Pernik	Minyor Pernik, Strumska Slava
2	Veliko Tarnovo	Etar, Lokomotiv GO
2	Sofia City	CSKA Sofia II, CSKA 1948 II
1
1	Dobrich	Dobrudzha
1	Burgas	Nesebar
1	Kyustendil	Marek
1	Gabrovo	Yantra
1	Lovech	Lovech
1	Pleven	Spartak Pleven
1	Montana	Montana
1	Plovdiv	Botev Plovdiv II
1	Razgrad	Ludogorets Razgrad II
1	Ruse	Dunav Ruse
1	Sofia	Sportist Svoge
1	Varna	Fratria

== League table ==
Pos	Team	Pld	W	D	L	GF	GA	GD	Pts	Promotion, qualification or relegation
1	Dobrudzha (C, P)	38	25	10	3	75	22	+53	85	Promotion to the First League
2	Montana (P)	38	22	12	4	53	15	+38	78	Promotion to the First League
3	Pirin Blagoevgrad	38	21	9	8	55	41	+14	72	Qualification for the promotion play-off
4	Marek	38	18	11	9	44	31	+13	65	Qualification for the promotion play-off
5	Yantra	38	18	10	10	59	37	+22	64	
6	Dunav Ruse	38	17	13	8	52	35	+17	64	
7	Etar	38	15	11	12	51	40	+11	56	
8	Belasitsa	38	16	8	14	42	45	−3	56	
9	CSKA 1948 II	38	16	4	18	51	53	−2	52	Ineligible for promotion
10	Lokomotiv Gorna Oryahovitsa	38	15	7	16	41	41	0	52	
11	Spartak Pleven	38	14	9	15	35	43	−8	51	
12	Ludogorets Razgrad II	38	13	12	13	53	42	+11	51	Ineligible for promotion
13	CSKA Sofia II	38	12	13	13	47	41	+6	49	Ineligible for promotion
14	Fratria	38	13	9	16	45	50	−5	48	
15	Minyor Pernik	38	11	8	19	36	56	−20	41	
16	Sportist Svoge	38	8	13	17	22	40	−18	37	
17	Lovech (R)	38	8	9	21	19	45	−26	33	Relegation to the Third League
18	Botev Plovdiv II (R)	38	8	5	25	33	70	−37	29	Relegation to the Third League
19	Strumska Slava (R)	38	4	16	18	23	54	−31	28	Relegation to the Third League
20	Nesebar (R)	38	5	13	20	28	63	−35	28	Relegation to the Third League

Source: bulgarian-football.com
Rules for classification: 1) Points; 2) Head-to-head points; 3) Head-to-head goal difference; 4) Head-to-head goals scored; 5) Head-to-head away goals scored (only if two teams); 6) Goal difference; 7) Goals scored; 8) Fairplay ranking; 9) Draw.
(C) Champions; (P) Promoted; (R) Relegated

== Results ==
Home \ Away	BEL	BOT	CSK	CSS	DOB	DUN	ETV	FRA	LGO	LOV	LUD	MAR	MIN	MON	NES	PIR	SPA	SPO	STR	YAN
Belasitsa	—	2–0	2–1	1–1	2–0	2–0	2–0	0–1	2–1	3–0	3–0	1–0	2–2	0–1	1–0	2–2	2–0	0–0	3–0	2–3
Botev Plovdiv II	1–0	—	1–2	4–2	0–5	1–1	0–1	2–2	0–2	0–0	2–0	2–0	1–2	0–0	0–2	3–0	0–1	0–1	2–2	2–3
CSKA 1948 II	1–1	2–1	—	0–0	0–3	1–2	2–0	1–0	1–0	3–0	1–2	2–0	3–1	0–2	3–3	2–1	2–0	2–0	1–0	1–4
CSKA Sofia II	2–0	2–0	4–0	—	1–3	1–2	0–3	4–1	2–4	0–1	1–1	1–2	5–1	0–0	2–0	0–1	0–0	1–2	0–0	0–0
Dobrudzha	2–0	3–1	4–1	4–0	—	2–0	0–1	2–0	1–0	2–0	0–0	2–1	2–0	0–0	6–1	2–1	1–0	4–0	3–1	3–0
Dunav	1–0	4–0	1–0	1–1	1–1	—	1–4	4–0	2–0	1–0	1–0	0–0	1–0	1–1	2–0	0–1	3–1	2–1	0–0	1–1
Etar	4–0	1–0	2–5	3–2	0–1	1–1	—	1–1	0–0	1–0	1–1	2–2	1–1	0–0	3–0	2–0	0–0	1–1	5–1	0–0
Fratria	5–1	2–1	4–0	0–2	1–1	0–4	3–1	—	1–2	3–0	2–2	0–1	1–1	1–2	1–0	0–1	0–2	2–0	1–1	1–3
Lokomotiv GO	0–1	2–0	1–3	1–1	3–2	2–1	1–0	2–1	—	0–0	2–1	4–1	0–1	0–3	0–0	0–2	2–0	1–0	4–0	2–0
Lovech	1–2	3–1	1–0	1–2	0–1	0–1	2–0	0–2	1–0	—	0–0	0–0	1–4	0–2	2–2	0–0	0–1	0–0	1–0	0–1
Ludogorets Razgrad II	4–0	5–0	2–1	0–0	1–1	4–1	0–2	2–0	2–0	0–0	—	0–2	5–1	1–2	2–0	2–3	3–2	0–2	4–0	1–1
Marek Dupnitsa	1–0	4–0	1–0	1–0	0–2	1–1	1–0	1–0	2–0	2–0	3–2	—	3–2	2–1	1–0	0–1	3–0	0–0	1–1	1–1
Minyor	1–0	1–2	1–0	0–1	1–2	0–2	3–2	0–2	1–0	2–0	1–1	1–0	—	0–1	0–0	1–1	1–0	1–1	4–1	0–2
Montana	5–0	2–0	2–0	0–0	1–1	2–2	0–2	0–1	1–0	1–0	0–0	0–0	4–0	—	2–0	1–1	1–0	1–0	0–0	1–0
Nesebar	0–0	0–1	2–1	0–3	1–1	1–1	0–2	3–1	1–1	1–2	2–2	0–2	2–0	1–3	—	1–5	1–2	2–1	0–0	0–3
Pirin	2–3	2–0	0–5	1–4	0–0	1–1	4–1	0–0	2–0	2–1	1–0	1–1	2–0	0–4	5–1	—	2–1	1–0	1–1	1–0
Spartak Pleven	0–0	0–2	1–0	0–0	0–0	2–5	2–1	0–0	2–2	1–0	2–0	2–0	3–2	2–1	1–0	1–2	—	0–1	2–0	2–2
Sportist Svoge	1–1	2–1	1–1	0–0	0–3	2–0	1–1	0–1	3–0	0–0	0–1	0–2	2–0	0–3	0–0	0–1	0–0	—	0–0	0–3
Strumska Slava	0–1	3–0	0–2	1–2	1–3	0–0	1–0	2–2	0–0	0–1	0–2	1–1	0–0	0–1	1–1	1–3	3–0	1–0	—	0–3
Yantra	2–0	5–3	3–1	2–0	2–2	2–1	1–2	1–2	0–2	4–1	2–0	1–1	1–0	0–2	0–0	0–1	1–2	3–0	0–0	—

Updated to match(es) played on 24 May 2025. Source: bulgarian-football.com
Legend: Blue = home team win; Yellow = draw; Red = away team win.
For upcoming matches, an "a" indicates there is an article about the rivalry between the two participants.

=== Results by round ===
Team ╲ Round	1	2	3	4	5	6	7	8	9	10	11	12	13	14	15	16	17	18	19	20	21	22	23	24	25	26	27	28	29	30	31	32	33	34	35	36	37	38
Belasitsa	W	L	W	L	W	D	W	L	W	D	L	L	W	D	W	L	D	L	D	W	W	L	W	W	W	L	W	L	D	L	D	D	W	L	L	L	D	W
Botev Plovdiv II	W	W	L	L	L	L	L	L	D	L	L	L	D	L	L	W	W	L	L	L	L	D	W	L	W	L	L	L	D	L	L	L	W	W	L	L	D	L
CSKA 1948 II	L	L	L	L	L	D	W	W	W	W	W	W	L	L	L	D	W	L	W	D	L	L	L	W	L	W	W	W	L	W	W	L	W	L	W	L	D	L
CSKA Sofia II	L	L	L	W	L	D	W	D	D	D	W	W	W	W	L	L	D	W	D	W	L	D	W	W	D	W	D	D	L	W	D	D	L	L	L	L	D	L
Dobrudzha	D	W	D	W	D	D	D	W	L	W	W	L	W	W	W	W	W	D	W	W	W	W	D	D	D	W	W	W	W	W	W	W	L	W	D	W	W	W
Dunav Ruse	W	W	L	D	L	W	L	D	D	L	D	W	W	D	W	L	W	W	D	W	D	W	D	D	W	W	D	W	D	D	L	W	L	W	D	L	W	W
Etar	W	D	L	W	W	L	D	L	L	W	W	W	D	L	W	L	W	W	D	D	L	W	L	W	W	L	D	L	D	L	L	D	D	W	D	W	D	W
Fratria	D	W	L	L	D	W	L	L	W	D	W	D	D	W	L	L	L	L	W	L	W	D	L	L	L	D	W	L	W	W	D	W	D	L	L	W	L	W
Lokomotiv Gorna Oryahovitsa	L	L	W	L	L	W	W	W	L	L	L	L	D	L	W	W	D	D	D	W	L	W	L	L	D	W	D	W	L	L	W	L	W	L	W	W	W	D
Lovech	W	L	W	D	L	L	L	L	W	W	L	D	D	W	L	L	L	D	L	L	L	D	D	L	L	L	L	W	D	W	L	W	L	L	D	L	D	L
Ludogorets Razgrad II	W	W	W	D	D	W	W	D	W	D	L	L	L	W	L	W	L	L	L	L	W	L	D	D	L	D	D	L	W	L	D	D	D	W	W	W	D	L
Marek Dupnitsa	D	D	L	W	D	W	D	D	W	L	D	D	L	W	W	W	W	W	W	W	D	W	L	D	L	W	L	L	W	D	W	L	D	W	W	L	W	W
Minyor Pernik	L	D	W	W	W	L	W	L	D	D	L	L	D	L	L	L	D	W	D	W	W	L	W	L	L	W	L	L	L	L	W	L	D	L	L	L	D	W
Montana	D	W	W	D	W	D	W	W	D	L	W	W	D	W	W	W	W	W	D	L	W	W	D	W	D	W	L	D	W	W	D	W	W	W	W	D	D	L
Nesebar	W	L	L	L	W	L	L	L	L	D	L	L	D	D	D	L	L	L	D	D	D	D	D	D	W	L	L	L	L	L	D	W	L	D	W	L	L	D
Pirin Blagoevgrad	W	D	W	W	W	W	W	D	W	W	W	L	D	D	W	W	D	D	D	W	W	D	L	L	L	W	W	W	W	W	L	L	W	W	D	W	L	L
Spartak Pleven	L	W	D	D	D	D	L	W	L	W	W	W	L	W	W	W	L	D	L	L	W	L	L	W	D	L	W	W	L	D	L	D	L	L	D	W	L	W
Sportist Svoge	L	L	W	D	L	L	L	L	D	D	L	W	D	L	L	D	L	D	L	L	L	D	W	D	W	L	L	W	D	D	D	D	D	W	L	W	D	L
Strumska Slava	L	D	W	L	D	L	L	D	L	L	W	D	L	L	D	L	L	D	D	L	L	D	W	D	D	L	D	L	L	D	D	D	W	D	L	D	L	L
Yantra Gabrovo	L	D	L	W	W	W	D	W	L	D	L	W	W	L	L	W	D	D	W	D	D	L	W	D	W	L	W	W	W	D	D	D	L	L	W	W	W	W

Updated to match(es) played on 24 May 2025. Source: Bulgarian Football
W = Win; D = Draw; L = Loss

=== Positions by round ===
Team ╲ Round	1	2	3	4	5	6	7	8	9	10	11	12	13	14	15	16	17	18	19	20	21	22	23	24	25	26	27	28	29	30	31	32	33	34	35	36	37	38
Belasitsa	2	10	7	10	7	5	4	4	3	3	4	4	3	5	4	5	6	9	8	8	5	7	6	5	4	6	4	6	7	7	7	7	7	7	7	8	8	8
Botev Plovdiv II	4	3	4	9	13	15	17	19	17	17	19	19	19	20	20	19	17	17	17	17	17	17	17	18	17	17	17	18	18	18	19	20	19	18	18	19	18	18
CSKA 1948 II	14	17	19	20	20	20	20	15	14	10	7	7	11	12	13	12	11	12	11	11	12	13	14	12	12	12	11	11	11	11	9	9	9	8	8	9	9	9
CSKA Sofia II	17	20	20	17	19	19	15	16	16	16	15	13	9	6	10	11	12	10	10	9	10	11	9	8	9	8	9	8	9	8	8	8	8	10	10	13	12	13
Dobrudzha	9	4	8	3	6	9	7	5	5	5	5	6	4	3	3	3	3	3	3	2	2	1	1	2	2	2	1	1	1	1	1	1	1	1	1	1	1	1
Dunav Ruse	1	1	5	7	10	7	10	11	9	14	14	11	8	11	8	10	9	6	7	5	6	5	5	6	5	4	5	4	4	4	6	4	4	4	5	6	6	6
Etar	5	7	10	5	5	4	6	10	11	9	6	5	6	8	7	8	8	5	5	6	8	6	8	7	7	7	8	10	8	10	10	11	10	9	9	7	7	7
Fratria	10	5	12	13	15	11	12	13	12	15	10	12	12	10	12	13	14	15	13	15	14	15	15	15	15	15	15	15	14	13	14	12	13	14	14	14	14	14
Lokomotiv Gorna Oryahovitsa	18	19	16	18	18	14	11	8	10	13	16	16	16	16	16	14	13	13	14	13	15	12	13	14	14	14	14	12	13	14	13	14	12	13	12	11	11	10
Lovech	7	12	6	8	9	13	14	14	15	11	13	15	15	14	14	15	15	16	16	16	16	16	16	16	16	16	16	16	16	16	16	16	16	17	17	17	17	17
Ludogorets Razgrad II	3	2	1	1	2	2	2	3	2	2	2	3	5	4	5	6	10	11	13	12	11	10	10	11	11	11	12	13	12	12	12	13	14	12	11	10	9	12
Marek Dupnitsa	11	13	17	11	11	10	9	9	8	8	11	10	14	13	9	7	4	4	4	4	4	4	4	4	6	5	6	7	6	6	4	6	5	5	4	4	4	4
Minyor Pernik	13	14	9	6	4	8	5	7	6	7	9	14	13	15	15	16	16	14	15	14	13	14	12	13	13	13	13	14	15	15	15	15	15	15	15	15	15	15
Montana	12	6	2	4	3	3	3	2	4	4	2	2	2	2	2	2	2	1	1	3	3	2	2	1	1	1	2	2	2	2	2	2	2	2	2	2	2	2
Nesebar	6	11	15	19	14	15	16	18	19	18	18	20	20	19	18	20	20	20	20	20	19	19	20	20	19	19	20	20	20	20	20	18	20	20	19	20	20	20
Pirin Blagoevgrad	8	8	3	2	1	1	1	1	1	1	1	1	1	1	1	1	1	2	2	1	1	3	3	3	3	3	3	3	3	3	3	3	3	3	3	3	3	3
Spartak Pleven	19	9	13	12	12	12	13	12	13	12	8	8	10	7	6	4	5	7	8	10	9	9	11	10	10	10	10	9	10	9	11	10	11	11	13	12	13	11
Sportist Svoge	16	18	14	16	17	18	19	20	20	19	20	18	18	18	19	18	19	19	19	20	20	20	19	19	18	18	19	17	17	17	17	17	17	16	16	16	16	16
Strumska Slava	20	16	11	15	16	17	18	17	18	20	17	17	17	17	17	17	18	18	18	18	18	18	18	17	20	20	18	19	19	19	18	19	18	19	20	18	19	19
Yantra Gabrovo	15	15	18	14	8	6	8	6	7	6	12	9	7	9	11	9	7	8	6	7	7	8	7	9	8	9	7	5	5	5	5	5	6	6	6	5	5	5

Updated to match(es) played on 24 May 2025. Source: Bulgarian Football

== Season statistics ==
=== Top scorers ===
As of 24 May 2025

Rank	Player	Club	Goals
1	(Bulgaria) Denislav Angelov	Fratria/Yantra Gabrovo	21
2	(Bulgaria) Martin Toshev	Yantra Gabrovo/Sportist Svoge	18
3	(France) Aymen Souda	Pirin Blagoevgrad	15
4	(Bulgaria) Ivan Kokonov	Etar/Montana	14
4	(Bulgaria) Hyusein Kelyovluev	Ludogorets II	14
4	(Bulgaria) Boris Dimitrov	CSKA 1948 II	14
7	(Bulgaria) Ivaylo Mihaylov	Dobrudzha	13
7	(Bulgaria) Yoan Bornosuzov	CSKA Sofia II	13
9	(Bulgaria) Rumen Rumenov	Dobrudzha	12
9	(Democratic Republic of the Congo) Jonathan N'Sondé	Dunav Ruse	12
9	(Bulgaria) Milcho Angelov	Dobrudzha	12
9	(Bulgaria) Martin Sorakov	Montana	12
13	(Nigeria) Philip Ejike	Montana	11
13	(Bulgaria) Preslav Antonov	Spartak Pleven	11
13	(Bulgaria) Iliya Dimitrov	Marek Dupnitsa	11

=== Clean sheets ===
As of 24 May 2025

Rank	Goalkeeper	Club	Clean sheets
1	(Bulgaria) Vasil Simeonov	Montana	23
2	(Bulgaria) Konstantin Kostadinov	Marek	16
3	(Bulgaria) Daniel Nikolov	Dunav Ruse	15
3	(Bulgaria) Krasimir Kostov	Pirin Blagoevgrad	15
5	(Bulgaria) Marin Orlinov	CSKA Sofia II	13
6	(Bulgaria) Galin Grigorov	Dobrudzha	11
7	(Bulgaria) Zahari Dimitrov	Belasitsa	10
7	(Bulgaria) Boyan Dishkov	Spartak Pleven	10
7	(Bulgaria) Stanislav Nistorov	Etar	10
7	(Bulgaria) Georgi Kitanov	Fratria/Spartak Pleven	10
11	(Bulgaria) Boris Gruev	Yantra Gabrovo	9
11	(Bulgaria) Damyan Hristov	Ludogorets II	9
11	(Ukraine) Hennadiy Hanyev	Lokomotiv Gorna Oryahovitsa	9
