= 2024–25 PFC Cherno More Varna season =

PFC Cherno More Varna
2024–25 season
- Manager: Ilian Iliev
- Stadium: Stadion Ticha
- First Professional Football League: 3rd
- Bulgarian Cup: Semi-Finals
- UEFA Conference League: Second qualifying round
- Top goalscorer: League: Mazire Soula (7); All: Mazire Soula (7)
- Highest home attendance: 8,000 v. CSKA Sofia (28 October 2024)
- Lowest home attendance: 520 v. Ludogorets Razgraad (22 February 2024)
- Average home league attendance: 2,295

The 2024–25 season is the 112th season in the history of PFC Cherno More Varna as a football club, and the club's 25th consecutive season in the First Professional Football League. In addition to the domestic league, the team is scheduled to participate in the Bulgarian Cup and the UEFA Conference League.

== Transfers ==
=== Transfers In ===
Date	Pos.	No.	Player	From	Fee	Ref.
Summer Transfers In
12 June 2024	GK	33	(Bulgaria) Plamen Iliev	(Romania) Universitatea Cluj	Free	
18 June 2024	CM	5	(Argentina) Nacho Pais	(Spain) Antequera	Free	
19 June 2024	RW	11	(Brazil) Dudu Rodrigues	(Brazil) Aparecidense	Free	
19 July 2024	RB	8	(Bulgaria) Asen Donchev	(Bulgaria) CSKA Sofia	Free	
8 August 2024	CF	13	(Romania) Claudiu Keșerü	Retirement	Free	
Winter Transfers In
22 December 2024	AM	12	(Bulgaria) Dimitar Tonev	(Bulgaria) Botev Plovdiv	Free	
28 February 2025	CF	98	(France) Derick Osei	Free Agent	Free	
Total					€0	

=== Transfers Out/Released ===
Date	Pos.	No.	Player	Next club	Join Date	Fee	Ref.
Summer Transfers Out
30 May 2024	LB	32	(Bulgaria) Martin Dichev	(Bulgaria) Botev Vratsa	27 June 2024	Free	
21 June 2024	RB		(Bulgaria) Petar Ivanov	(Bulgaria) Etar Veliko Tarnovo	21 June 2024	Free	
21 June 2024	RW	33	(Brazil) Michael Alves	(Bulgaria) Dobrudzha Dobrich	21 June 2024	Free	
30 June 2024	CM	5	(Spain) Pablo Alvarez	(Ukraine) Karpaty Lviv	1 July 2024	Free	
30 June 2024	GK	25	(Bulgaria) Ivan Dyulgerov	(Bulgaria) CSKA Sofia	2 July 2024	Free	
30 June 2024	CF	9	(Bulgaria) Atanas Iliev	(Cyprus) Anorthosis	9 September 2024	Free	
Winter Transfers Out
31 December 2024	CF	13	(Romania) Claudiu Keșerü	Retirement	1 January 2025	Free	
30 January 2025	RW	11	(Brazil) Dudu Rodrigues	(Greece) Aris Thessaloniki	30 January 2025	€1.5M	
1 February 2025	LW	23	(Portugal) Edgar Pacheco	(Luxembourg) Differdange 03	24 June 2025	Free	
19 February 2025	RW	91	(Bulgaria) Velislav Vasilev	(Bulgaria) Yantra Gabrovo	19 February 2025	Free	
Total						€1.5M	

=== Loans in ===
Date	Pos.	No.	Player	Loaned from	On loan until	Ref.
Summer Loans In
29 August 2024	DM	88	(Brazil) Renan Areias	(Bulgaria) Krumovgrad	24 December 2024	
Winter Loans In
29 January 2025	RW	11	(Guinea) Thierno Barry	(Cyprus) EN Paralimniou	End of the season	

=== Loans out ===
Date	Pos.	No.	Player	Loaned to	On loan until	Ref.
Summer Loans Out
28 August 2024	RW	39	(Bulgaria) Nikolay Zlatev	(Slovenia) NK Tabor Sežana	31 December 2024	

=== New contracts ===
Date	Pos.	No.	Player	Contract until	Ref.
15 April 2025	RB	2	(Bulgaria) Tsvetomir Panov	30 June 2026	
16 April 2025	DM	71	(Bulgaria) Vasil Panayotov	30 June 2026	

== First team ==
=== First-team coaching staff ===
Position	Name	Date of birth (age)	Appointed on	Last club
Manager	(Bulgaria) Ilian Iliev	2 July 1968 (aged 56)	28 December 2017	(Bulgaria) Vereya
Assistant Coach	(Bulgaria) Petar Kostadinov	1 April 1978 (aged 47)	28 December 2017	(Bulgaria) Vereya
Assistant Coach	(Bulgaria) Veselin Branimirov	25 August 1975 (aged 49)	1 November 2023	(Ukraine) Zorya Luhansk
Goalkeeping coach	(Bulgaria) Boyan Peykov	1 May 1984 (aged 41)	28 December 2017	(Bulgaria) Vereya

=== First-team squad ===
No.	Player	Position	Date of birth (age)	Signed from	Signing date	Fee	Contract ends
Goalkeepers
33	(Bulgaria) Plamen Iliev	GK	30 November 1991 (aged 33)	(Romania) Universitatea Cluj	12 June 2024	Free	2026
84	(Bulgaria) Hristiyan Slavkov	GK	26 February 2003 (aged 22)	(Bulgaria) Botev Plovdiv	4 July 2023	Free	2025
Defenders
2	(Bulgaria) Tsvetomir Panov	RB/LB	17 April 1989 (aged 36)	(Bulgaria) Ludogorets	10 January 2019	Free	2026
3	(Bulgaria) Zhivko Atanasov	CB (VC)	3 February 1991 (aged 34)	(Bulgaria) Levski Sofia	16 June 2021	Free	2025
4	(Bulgaria) Rosen Stefanov	CB	10 October 2002 (aged 22)	(Bulgaria) Cherno More U19	1 July 2021	YS	2026
6	(Bulgaria) Viktor Popov	RB/LB	5 March 2000 (aged 25)	(Bulgaria) Cherno More U19	28 May 2019	YS	2025
8	(Bulgaria) Asen Donchev	RB/LB/ RW/LW	22 October 2001 (aged 23)	(Bulgaria) CSKA Sofia	19 July 2024	Free	2027
15	(Spain) Dani Martin	LB/LW	31 May 1997 (aged 28)	(Spain) Melilla	9 February 2024	Free	2026
27	(Bulgaria) Daniel Dimov	CB/DM (C)	21 January 1989 (aged 36)	(Turkey) Boluspor	27 August 2019	Free	2025
28	(North Macedonia) Vlatko Drobarov	CB/DM	2 November 1992 (aged 32)	Free Agent	8 March 2023	Free	2026
Midfielders
5	(Argentina) Nacho Pais	CM	30 May 2000 (aged 25)	(Spain) Antequera	18 June 2024	Free	2027
10	(France) Mazire Soula	AM/LW	6 June 1998 (aged 26)	Free Agent	13 December 2021	Free	2025
17	(Bulgaria) Martin Milushev	AM/RW	30 March 2002 (aged 23)	(Bulgaria) Cherno More U19	21 July 2021	YS	2026
22	(Bulgaria) Nikolay Kostadinov	AM	28 July 2005 (aged 19)	(Bulgaria) Cherno More II	17 July 2024	YS	2027
23	(Bulgaria) Dimitar Tonev	AM/LW	15 October 2001 (aged 23)	(Bulgaria) Botev Plovdiv	22 December 2024	Free	2028
29	(Bulgaria) Berk Beyhan	DM/CM	29 October 2004 (aged 20)	(Bulgaria) Cherno More II	15 June 2023	YS	2026
71	(Bulgaria) Vasil Panayotov	DM/CM/ AM (VC)	16 July 1990 (aged 34)	(Bulgaria) Levski Sofia	7 August 2018	Free	2026
88	(Brazil) ~~Renan Areias~~	DM/CM	18 January 1998 (aged 27)	(Bulgaria) Krumovgrad	29 August 2024	Loan	2024
Attackers
7	(Brazil) Breno Teixeira	LW/CF	7 May 2002 (aged 23)	(Brazil) Cruzeiro	6 September 2023	Free	2026
9	(Bulgaria) Ismail Isa	CF	26 June 1989 (aged 35)	Free Agent	2 September 2022	Free	2025
11	(Brazil) ~~Dudu Rodrigues~~	RW	17 July 2002 (aged 22)	(Brazil) Aparecidense	19 June 2024	Free	2027
11	(Guinea) Thierno Barry	RW	12 January 2000 (aged 25)	(Cyprus) EN Paralimniou	29 January 2025	Loan	2025
13	(Romania) ~~Claudiu Keșerü~~	CF	2 December 1986 (aged 38)	Retirement	8 August 2024	Free	2024
16	(Romania) Andreias Calcan	LW	9 April 1994 (aged 31)	(Romania) Universitatea Cluj	14 February 2024	Free	2026
23	(Portugal) ~~Edgar Pacheco~~	LW	23 June 2000 (aged 24)	(Portugal) B-SAD	28 February 2023	Free	2026
39	(Bulgaria) Nikolay Zlatev	RW/LW	12 December 2004 (aged 20)	(Bulgaria) Cherno More U19	9 June 2022	YS	2025
91	(Bulgaria) ~~Velislav Vasilev~~	RW	27 March 2001 (aged 24)	(Bulgaria) Cherno More U19	1 February 2020	YS	2026
98	(France) Derick Osei	CF	10 September 1998 (aged 26)	(France) Nîmes	28 February 2025	Free	2026
99	(Brazil) Weslen Júnior	RW/LW/CF	12 November 1999 (aged 25)	(Bahrain) Manama	16 January 2024	Free	2026

Notes:

Players crossed out left the club before the end of the season.

Contracts, squad numbers and ages of the players are last updated on 1 June 2025

== Friendlies ==
=== Pre-season ===
21 July 2024 Friendly	Farul Constanța (Romania)	0-1	(Bulgaria) Cherno More Varna	Ovidiu, Romania
18:00 UTC+3			Isa 37'	Stadium: Central Stadium

25 July 2024 Friendly	Cherno More Varna (Bulgaria)	2-5	(Bulgaria) Botev Plovdiv	Pravets, Bulgaria
18:00 UTC+3	Isa 65'; Milushev 120'		Ujah 23'; Nwachukwu 43'; Nwachukwu 55'; Umeh 57'; Sekulic 90'	Stadium: Pravets Sports Complex
Note: The match had 4 halfs of 30 minutes

3 July 2024 Friendly	Levski Sofia (Bulgaria)	0-0	(Bulgaria) Cherno More Varna	Pravets, Bulgaria
18:00 UTC+3				Stadium: Pravets Sports Complex

10 July 2024 Friendly	Cherno More Varna (Bulgaria)	0–1	(Bulgaria) Fratria	Varna, Bulgaria
17:45 UTC+3			Andoni 90'	Stadium: Mladost Stadium

10 July 2024 Friendly	Cherno More Varna (Bulgaria)	4–0	(Bulgaria) Dunav Ruse	Varna, Bulgaria
20:15 UTC+3	Dudu Rodrigues 19'; Soula 64'; Breno 78' (pen.); Panayotov 89'			Stadium: Stadion Ticha

13 July 2024 Friendly	Cherno More Varna (Bulgaria)	2–0	(Bulgaria) Dobrudzha Dobrich	Varna, Bulgaria
18:30 UTC+3	Calcan 43'; Soula 56'			Stadium: Stadion Ticha

== Competitions ==
=== Overall record ===
Competition	First match	Last match	Starting round	Record							
Competition	First match	Last match	Starting round	Pld	W	D	L	GF	GA	GD	Win %
First Professional Football League	19 July 2024		Matchday 1	1	0	1	0	0	0	+0	0.00
Bulgarian Cup				0	0	0	0	0	0	+0	—
UEFA Conference League	25 July 2024		Second qualifying round	1	0	1	0	0	0	+0	0.00
Total				2	0	2	0	0	0	+0	0.00

Last updated: 25 July 2024
Source: Soccerway

=== First Professional Football League (Bulgaria) ===
==== League table ====
Pos	Team	Pld	W	D	L	GF	GA	GD	Pts	Qualification
2	Levski Sofia	30	19	5	6	55	25	+30	62	Qualification for the Championship group
3	Arda	30	15	8	7	49	33	+16	53 (Note: Head-to-head points: Arda 4; Cherno More 1.)	Qualification for the Championship group
4	Cherno More	30	14	11	5	41	25	+16	53	Qualification for the Championship group
5	Botev Plovdiv	30	14	7	9	32	31	+1	49	Qualification for the Conference League group
6	Spartak Varna	30	14	6	10	39	38	+1	48	Qualification for the Conference League group

Source: soccerway, Bulgarian Football
Rules for classification: 1) Points; 2) Head-to-head points; 3) Head-to-head goal difference; 4) Head-to-head goals scored; 5) Head-to-head away goals scored (only if two teams); 6) Goal difference; 7) Goals scored; 8) Fairplay ranking; 9) Draw
Notes:

Pos	Team	Pld	W	D	L	GF	GA	GD	Pts	Qualification	LUD	LEV	CHM	ARD
1	Ludogorets Razgrad (C)	36	25	8	3	70	22	+48	83	Qualification for the Champions League first qualifying round	—	1–1	2–0	2–2
2	Levski Sofia	36	21	9	6	64	29	+35	72	Qualification for the Europa League first qualifying round (Note: As Ludogorets Razgrad won the 2024–25 Bulgarian Cup, the cup's Europa League first qualifying round berth was passed to the second-placed team in the First League.)	2–2	—	2–0	1–1
3	Cherno More	36	15	14	7	44	30	+14	59	Qualification for the Conference League second qualifying round	2–0	0–0	—	1–1
4	Arda (O)	36	15	13	8	54	41	+13	58	Qualification for the Conference League play-off	1–1	0–3	0–0	—

Source: soccerway, Bulgarian Football
Legend: Blue = home team win; Yellow = draw; Red = away team win.
Rules for classification: 1) Points; 2) Head-to-head points; 3) Head-to-head goal difference; 4) Head-to-head goals scored; 5) Head-to-head away goals scored (only if two teams); 6) Goal difference; 7) Goals scored; 8) Fairplay ranking; 9) Draw
(C) Champions; (O) Play-off winners
Notes:

Pos	Team	Pld	W	D	L	GF	GA	GD	Pts	Qualification	CSS	BPD	SPV	BER
1	CSKA Sofia	36	19	8	9	58	28	+30	65	Qualification for the Conference League play-off	—	3–0	5–0	2–1
2	Botev Plovdiv	36	16	8	12	43	43	0	56		0–4	—	3–2	1–1
3	Spartak Varna	36	15	6	15	45	53	−8	51		0–1	2–1	—	1–2
4	Beroe	36	14	7	15	41	43	−2	49		0–3	0–6	3–1	—

Source: soccerway, Bulgarian Football
Legend: Blue = home team win; Yellow = draw; Red = away team win.
Rules for classification: 1) Points; 2) Head-to-head points; 3) Head-to-head goal difference; 4) Head-to-head goals scored; 5) Head-to-head away goals scored (only if two teams); 6) Goal difference; 7) Goals scored; 8) Fairplay ranking; 9) Draw

Pos	Team	Pld	W	D	L	GF	GA	GD	Pts	Qualification or relegation	SLA	LSO	CSK	SEP	LPD	BVR	KRU	HEB
1	Slavia Sofia	37	14	7	16	50	52	−2	49		—	0–0	0–1	—	1–2	—	—	3–2
2	Lokomotiv Sofia	37	13	8	16	43	51	−8	47 (Note: Head-to-head points: Lokomotiv Sofia 4; CSKA 1948 1.)		—	—	2–1	—	—	3–0	3–0	3–0
3	CSKA 1948	37	12	11	14	45	47	−2	47		—	—	—	2–0	—	0–1	2–0	0–0
4	Septemvri Sofia	37	14	3	20	42	56	−14	45		3–1	0–2	—	—	2–0	—	—	1–0
5	Lokomotiv Plovdiv (O)	37	10	8	19	37	49	−12	38	Qualification for the relegation play-off	—	1–1	0–1	—	—	1–3	—	—
6	Botev Vratsa (O)	37	10	6	21	34	65	−31	36	Qualification for the relegation play-off	2–1	—	—	3–2	—	—	1–0	—
7	Krumovgrad (R)	37	8	9	20	20	45	−25	33	Relegation to the Second League	0–1	—	—	1–2	0–4	—	—	—
8	Hebar (R)	37	4	9	24	28	64	−36	21	Relegation to the Second League	—	—	—	—	1–2	1–0	1–3	—

Source: Soccerway, Bulgarian Football
Legend: Blue = home team win; Yellow = draw; Red = away team win.
Rules for classification: 1) Points; 2) Head-to-head points (only in regular season); 3) Head-to-head goal difference (only in regular season); 4) Head-to-head goals scored (only in regular season); 5) Head-to-head away goals scored (only if two teams and only in regular season); 6) Goal difference; 7) Goals scored; 8) Fairplay ranking; 9) Draw
(O) Play-off winners; (R) Relegated

==== Results summary ====
Overall								Home						Away					
Pld	W	D	L	GF	GA	GD	Pts	W	D	L	GF	GA	GD	W	D	L	GF	GA	GD
28	13	10	5	38	23	+15	49	6	7	1	20	9	+11	7	3	4	18	14	+4

Last updated: 5 April 2025.
Source: soccerway

==== Results by round ====
Round	1	2	3	4	5	6	7	8	9	10	11	12	13	14	15	16	17	18	19	20	21	22	23	24	25	26	27	28	29	30
Ground	H	H	A	H	A	H	A	H	A	H	A	H	A	H	A	A	A	H	A	H	A	H	A	H	A	H	A	H	A	H
Result	D	W	L	W	W	W	D	W	W	D	L	D	L	W	W	W	W	W	W	L	D	D	W	D	D	D	L	D		
Position	8	5	6	4	4	3	3	3	3	3	4	4	5	5	4	4	4	4	3	4	3	3	3	3	3	3	3	4		

Updated to match(es) played on 5 April 2025. Source: worldfootball
A = Away; H = Home; W = Win; D = Draw; L = Loss

==== Matches ====
The match schedule was released on 13 June 2024.

19 July 2024 1	Cherno More Varna	0–0	CSKA 1948	Varna, Bulgaria
18:45 UTC+3	Vlatko Drobarov (yellow card) 35'		Bidounga (yellow card) 16' (yellow-red card) 89'; Umarbaev (yellow card) 42'; Jeka (yellow card) 70'; Vasilev (yellow card) 75'; Furtado (yellow card) 86'	Stadium: Stadion Ticha; Attendance: 2,544; Referee: (Bulgaria) Georgi Ginchev

29 July 2024 2	Cherno More Varna	2–0	Septemvri Sofia	Varna, Bulgaria
21:15 UTC+3	Isa 55'; Soula 87'	Report	Georgi Varbanov (yellow card) 57'; Achol (yellow card) 65'; Ellé (yellow card) 82'	Stadium: Stadion Ticha; Attendance: 1,500; Referee: (Bulgaria) Vladimir Valkov

4 August 2024 3	Lokomotiv Sofia	2–1	Cherno More Varna	Sofia, Bulgaria
19:00 UTC+3	Atska (yellow card) 49'; Aralica 52'; Athanasios Pitsolis (yellow card) 54'; Dikov 90+2'; Luka Ivanov (yellow card) 90+7'	Report	Calcan (yellow card) 51'; Soula (red card) 64'; Donchev 90+8'	Stadium: Stadion Lokomotiv; Attendance: 390; Referee: (Bulgaria) Stanimir Trenchev

12 August 2024 4	Cherno More Varna	2–1	Botev Vratsa	Varna, Bulgaria
21:15 UTC+3	Drobarov 40'; Dudu Rodrigues (yellow card) 47'; Milushev (yellow card) 52'; Panayotov 70'	Report	Perea (yellow card) 12' (goal) 35'; Lozev (yellow card) 31'; Traorè (yellow card) 39'; Stoyanov (yellow card) 45'; Kondrakov (yellow card) 74'	Stadium: Stadion Ticha; Attendance: 1,300; Referee: (Bulgaria) Dimitar Dimitrov

19 August 2024 5	Lokomotiv Plovdiv	1–2	Cherno More Varna	Plovdiv, Bulgaria
21:15 UTC+3	Segura (yellow card) 16'; Lamy 62'	Report	Dimov (yellow card) 40'; Dudu Rodrigues (yellow card) 59'; Isa 75'; Drobarov 82'; Pais (yellow card) 87'	Stadium: Stadion Lokomotiv; Attendance: 3,300; Referee: (Bulgaria) Vasimir El Khatib

26 August 2024 6	Cherno More Varna	3–0	Krumovgrad	Varna, Bulgaria
21:15 UTC+3	Panayotov 37'; Dimov (yellow card) 42'; Soula 61'; Panov 74' (yellow card) 79'; Vasilev (yellow card) 90+3'	Report	Milev (yellow card) 9'	Stadium: Stadion Ticha; Attendance: 1,000; Referee: (Bulgaria) Valentin Zhelezov

1 September 2024 7	Ludogorets Razgrad	0-0	Cherno More Varna	Razgrad, Bulgaria
21:30 UTC+3	Kamara (red card) 76'		Iliev (yellow card) 45'; Panayotov (yellow card) 45'; Dimov (yellow card) 83'; Popov (yellow card) 90+3'; Keșerü (yellow card) 90+9'	Stadium: Huvepharma Arena; Attendance: 1,500; Referee: (Bulgaria) Nikola Popov

15 September 2024 12	Cherno More Varna	1-1	Arda Kardzhali	Varna, Bulgaria
18:00 UTC+3	Drobarov (yellow card) 42'; Iliev (yellow card) 68'; Keșerü (yellow card) 90+2'; Atanasov 90+5'		Eboa Eboa 14'; Offor (yellow card) 42'; Yordanov (yellow card) 51'; Velkovski (yellow card) 64'; Cascardo (yellow card) 73'; Gospodinov (yellow card) 89'	Stadium: Stadion Ticha; Attendance: 1,200; Referee: Radoslav Gidzhenov

22 September 2024 9	Spartak Varna	0-2	Cherno More	Varna, Bulgaria
20:00 EEST	Baurenski (yellow card) 3'; Vutov (yellow card) 60'; Granchov (yellow card) 61'; Ilić (yellow card) 68'	Report	Dimov (yellow card) 1'; Soula 8' (pen.); João Pedro (yellow card) 12' (goal) 58'; Popov (yellow card) 18'; Dani Martín (yellow card) 61'; Drobarov (yellow card) 81'	Stadium: Stadion Spartak; Attendance: 6,000; Referee: (Bulgaria) Georgi Kabakov

28 September 2024 10	Cherno More	0-0	CSKA Sofia	Varna, Bulgaria
20:00 EEST	João Pedro (yellow card) 82'	Report	Leya Iseka (yellow card) 70'	Stadium: Stadion Ticha; Attendance: 8,000; Referee: (Bulgaria) Georgi Ginchev

4 October 2024 11	Slavia Sofia	1-0	Cherno More	Sofia
20:00 EEST	Kerchev (yellow card) 29'; Chung Nguyen Do (yellow card) 52'; Georgiev (yellow card) 63'; Fabien 77'; Kristiyan Stoyanov (yellow card) 81'; Ivanov (yellow card) 89'; Seedorf (yellow card) 90+3'	Report	Isa (yellow card) 48'; Weslen Júnior (yellow card) 82'; Soula (yellow card) 89'	Stadium: Stadion Aleksandar Shalamanov; Attendance: 910; Referee: (Bulgaria) Valentin Zhelezov

20 October 2024 8	Cherno More	1-0	Hebar Pazardzhik	Varna, Bulgaria
16:45 EEST	Iliev (yellow card) 45'; Isa (yellow card) 45+2'; Dudu Rodrigues 75' (yellow card) 90'; Soula (yellow card) 80'	Report	Kabov (yellow card) 11'; Georgi Plamenov Staykov (yellow card) 18'; Penchev (yellow card) 34'; Nikolaev (yellow card) 69'	Stadium: Stadion Ticha; Attendance: 2,100; Referee: (Bulgaria) Denislav Stalev

25 October 2024 13	Botev Plovdiv	1-0	Cherno More	Plovdiv
16:30 EEST	Triboulet 5'; Alen Korošec (yellow card) 36'; Balogiannis (yellow card) 56'; Maraš (yellow card) 90+2'	Report	Dimov (yellow card) 78'; Calcan (yellow card) 90'	Stadium: Stadion Hristo Botev; Attendance: 1,744; Referee: (Bulgaria) Georgi Davidov

3 November 2024	Cherno More	-	Levski Sofia	Varna, Bulgaria
17:30				Stadium: Stadion Ticha

9 November 2024	Beroe	-	Cherno More	Stara Zagora
15:00				Stadium: Stadion Beroe

24 November 2024	CSKA 1948	-	Cherno More	Sofia
14:30				Stadium: Stadion Bistritsa

29 November 2024	Septemvri Sofia	-	Cherno More	Sofia
17:00				Stadium: Stadion Lokomotiv

3 December 2024	Cherno More	-	Lokomotiv Sofia	Varna, Bulgaria
15:00				Stadium: Stadion Ticha

7 December 2024	Botev Vratsa	-	Cherno More	Vratsa
15:00				Stadium: Stadion Hristo Botev

=== UEFA Conference League ===
==== Second qualifying round ====
The draw was held on 19 June 2024.

25 July 2024 First leg	Hapoel Be'er Sheva (Israel)	0–0	(Bulgaria) Cherno More	Lovech, Bulgaria
19:00		Report		Stadium: Gradski stadion Referee: Daniyar Sakhi (Kazakhstan)

1 August 2024 Second leg	Cherno More (Bulgaria)	1–2 (1–2 agg.)	(Israel) Hapoel Be'er Sheva	Razgrad
20:30 UTC+3	Calcan 33'; Weslen Júnior (yellow card) 40'	Report	Hélder Lopes 25' (yellow card) 39' (goal) 64'; Guy Mizrahi (yellow card) 32'; Hatuel (yellow card) 53'; Tibi (yellow card) 81'; Shushenachev (yellow card) 88'; Blorian (yellow card) 89'	Stadium: Huvepharma Arena; Attendance: 3,243; Referee: (Serbia) Danilo Nikolić
