= 2025–26 PFC Cherno More Varna season =

PFC Cherno More Varna's 62nd season in the top flight of Bulgarian football

Cherno More
2025–26 season
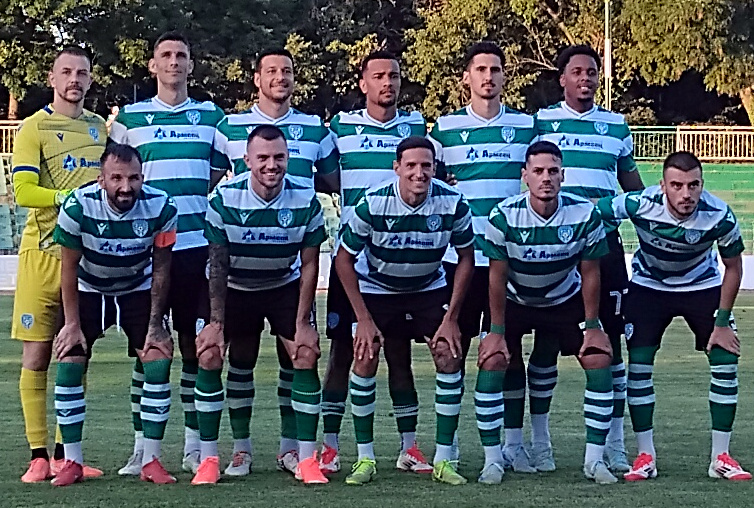
- Owner: Chimimport
- Chairman: Plamen Andreev
- Manager: Ilian Iliev
- Stadium: Ticha
- Parva Liga: 5th
- Bulgarian Cup: Round of 16
- UEFA Conference League: Second qualifying round
- Top goalscorer: League: Georgi Lazarov (8 goals); All: Georgi Lazarov (8 goals)
Home colours	Away colours	Third colours

The 2025–26 season is Cherno More's 62nd season in the top flight since the establishment of the league in 1948 and the 26th consecutive one. In addition to the domestic league, the club also participates in the UEFA Conference League and the Bulgarian Cup.

== Transfers and contracts ==
=== In ===
Date	Pos.	Name	From	Fee
9 June 2025	FW	(Bulgaria) Georgi Lazarov	(Bulgaria) Fratria	Free
9 June 2025	MF	(Brazil) Phellipe	(Brazil) Ibrachina FC U20	Free
10 June 2025	MF	(Bulgaria) Asen Chandarov	(Bulgaria) Levski Sofia	Free
11 June 2025	MF	(Brazil) João Pedro	(Spain) Linense	Free
11 June 2025	FW	(Portugal) Celso Sidney	(Portugal) Lusitânia	Free
11 June 2025	DF	(Brazil) Bandaró	(Brazil) Ibrachina FC U20	Free
11 June 2025	GK	(Bulgaria) Kristian Tomov	(Bulgaria) Lokomotiv Plovdiv	Free
11 June 2025	MF	(Bulgaria) Petar Marinov	(Bulgaria) Cherno More II	Free
14 June 2025	FW	(Brazil) Gustavo França	(Portugal) UD Santarém	Free
5 July 2025	MF	(Portugal) David Teles	(Portugal) Anadia	Free

=== Out ===
Date	Pos.	Name	Next club	Fee
26 May 2025	MF	(Bulgaria) Daniel Dimov	Retired	Retired
30 May 2025	DF	(Bulgaria) Viktor Popov	(Poland) Korona Kielce	Free
31 May 2025	GK	(Bulgaria) Hristiyan Slavkov		Free
7 June 2025	FW	(Brazil) Breno Teixeira	(Brazil) América Mineiro	Undisclosed

== Pre-season and friendlies ==
=== Pre-season ===
Win Draw Loss Fixtures

18 June 2025	Farul	1–2	Cherno More
	Cojocaru 2'	Report	Weslen Jr. 57' Phellipe 84'

24 June 2025	Cherno More	3–0	Sevlievo
	Weslen Jr. 23'; Sidney 29'; Pedro 34'	Report

26 June 2025	Cherno More	2–0	Spartak Pleven
	Sidney 35', 38'	Report

1 July 2025	Cherno More	4–1	Etar
	Lazarov 10'; Sidney 34' (pen.); Chandarov 71'; França 88'	Report	Zhivko Atanasov 55' (o.g.); Karaangelov (red card) 65'

9 July 2025	Cherno More	1–0	Chernomorets Balchik
	Lazarov 39'; Weslen Jr. (penalty missed) 65'

9 July 2025	Cherno More	2–0	Chernomorets Burgas
	Panayotov 32'; França 44'

12 July 2025	Cherno More	4–1	Dobrudzha
	Weslen Jr. 12'; Zlatev 22'; Sidney 44'; Milushev 73' (pen.)	Report

=== Friendlies during the international break ===
5 September 2025	Farul	1–1	Cherno More	Ovidiu, Romania
15:00 (UTC+2:00)	Buta 90'	Report	Weslen 65'	Stadium: Central Stadium

8 October 2025	Cherno More	3–0	Dobrudzha	Varna, Bulgaria
15:00 (UTC+2:00)	Phellipe; França; Mihaylov	Report		Stadium: Stadion Mladost

12 November 2025	Cherno More	3–0	Dobrudzha	Varna, Bulgaria
14:30 (UTC+02:00)	Stefanov 24'; Teles 38'; Bandaro 41'	Report		Stadium: Stadion Mladost

=== Winter brea ===
10 January 2026	Farul	1–2	Cherno More	Ovidiu Romania
13:30 (UTC+2:00)	Larie 40' (pen.)	Report	Chandarov 60'; Nyagolov 69'	Stadium: Central Stadium
Note: The match had 4 quarters of 30 minutes

14 January 2026	Cherno More	0–1	Dobrudzha	Albena, Bulgaria
14:00 (UTC+2:00)		Report	Hurtado 16'	Stadium: Stadion Albena 1

28 January 2026	Cherno More	v	Chernomorets Burgas	Varna, Bulgaria
				Stadium: Stadion Mladost

28 January 2026	Cherno More	v	Lokomotiv GO	Varna, Bulgaria
				Stadium: Stadion Ticha

31 January 2026	Cherno More	v	Etar	Varna, Bulgaria
				Stadium: Stadion Ticha

== Competitions ==
=== Overall record ===
Competition	First match	Last match	Starting round	Record							
Competition	First match	Last match	Starting round	Pld	W	D	L	GF	GA	GD	Win %
Parva Liga	August 2025	May 2026	Matchday 1	0	0	0	0	0	0	+0	—
Bulgarian Cup			Round of 32	0	0	0	0	0	0	+0	—
UEFA Conference League	July 2025		Second qualifying round	0	0	0	0	0	0	+0	—
Total				0	0	0	0	0	0	+0	—

Last updated: pre-season
Source: Soccerway

=== Parva Liga ===
==== Preliminary stage ====
===== League table =====
Pos	Team	Pld	W	D	L	GF	GA	GD	Pts	Qualification
4	CSKA Sofia	30	16	8	6	43	23	+20	56	Qualification for the Championship group
5	Lokomotiv Plovdiv	30	11	13	6	30	33	−3	46	Qualification for the Conference League group
6	Cherno More	30	11	11	8	33	26	+7	44 (Note: Head-to-head points: Cherno More 4; Arda 1.)	Qualification for the Conference League group
7	Arda	30	12	8	10	33	27	+6	44	Qualification for the Conference League group
8	Botev Plovdiv	30	11	7	12	40	37	+3	40	Qualification for the Conference League group

Source: Soccerway, Bulgarian Football
Rules for classification: 1) Points; 2) Head-to-head points; 3) Head-to-head goal difference; 4) Head-to-head goals scored; 5) Head-to-head away goals scored (only if two teams); 6) Goal difference; 7) Goals scored; 8) Fairplay ranking; 9) Draw

==== Results summary ====
Overall								Home						Away					
Pld	W	D	L	GF	GA	GD	Pts	W	D	L	GF	GA	GD	W	D	L	GF	GA	GD
0	0	0	0	0	0	0	0	0	0	0	0	0	0	0	0	0	0	0	0

Last updated: pre-season.
Source: Soccerway

==== Matches ====
Win Draw Loss Fixtures

18 July 2025 1	Lokomotiv Sofia	1–1	Cherno More	Sofia, Bulgaria
21:15 (UTC+02:00)	Aralica 32'		Chandarov 19'; Zlatev (yellow card) 23'	Stadium: Lokomotiv; Attendance: 450; Referee: (Bulgaria) Valentin Zhelezov

27 July 2025 2	Cherno More	2–1	Botev Plovdiv	Varna, Bulgaria
19:45 (UTC+02:00)	Lazarov 17', 18'; Sidney (penalty missed) 43'; Zlatev (yellow card) 85'		Balogiannis (yellow card) 3'; Minkov (yellow card) 10' (goal) 59'	Stadium: Ticha; Attendance: 2,200; Referee: (Bulgaria) Mariyan Grebencharski

4 August 2025 3	Cherno More	4–0	Beroe	Varna, Bulgaria
19:00 (UTC+2:00)	Pedro 39'; Atanasov (yellow card) 49'; Drobarov (yellow card) 61'; Zlatev 78', 89', 90+6' (pen.)		Masogo (yellow card) 58'	Stadium: Ticha; Attendance: 1,800; Referee: (Bulgaria) Ventsislav Mitrev

9 August 2025 4	CSKA Sofia	0–0	Cherno More	Sofia, Bulgaria
19:00 (UTC+02:00)	Turitsov (yellow card) 7'; Chorbadzhiyski (yellow card) 88'; Dellova (yellow card) 90+6'		Teles (yellow card) 33'; Phellipe (yellow card) 78'	Stadium: Vasil Levski National Stadium; Attendance: 3,300; Referee: (Bulgaria) Radoslav Gidzhenov

16 August 2025 5	Spartak Varna	1–3	Cherno More	Varna, Bulgaria
19:00 (UTC+02:00)	Xande 12'; Yordanov (yellow card) 5'; Granchov (yellow card) 31'; Ivanov (yellow card) 65'; Pehlivanov (yellow card) 71'		Lazarov 2'; Zlatev 39'; Phellipe 89'; Panov (yellow card) 31'; Drobarov (yellow card) 82'	Stadium: Spartak; Attendance: 5,000; Referee: (Bulgaria) Krasen Georgiev

23 August 2025 6	Cherno More	1–1	Lokomotiv Plovdiv	Varna, Bulgaria
21:15 (UTC+02:00)	Lazarov 29' (yellow card) 56'; Teles (yellow card) 43'		Cova 90+2' (yellow card) 51'; Ruskov (yellow card) 15'; Politino (yellow card) 34'; Ivanov (yellow card) 61'	Stadium: Ticha; Attendance: 2,100; Referee: (Bulgaria) Lyuboslav Lyubomirov

7	Botev Vratsa	v	Cherno More	Vratsa
				Stadium: Hristo Botev

8	Cherno More	v	Dobrudzha	Varna
				Stadium: Ticha

9	Arda	v	Cherno More	Kardzhali
				Stadium: Arena Arda

10	Cherno More	v	Septemvri Sofia	Varna
				Stadium: Ticha

11	Montana	v	Cherno More	Montana
				Stadium: Montana

12	Cherno More	v	Levski Sofia	Varna
				Stadium: Ticha

13	Slavia Sofia	v	Cherno More	Sofia
				Stadium: Aleksandar Shalamanov

14	Cherno More	v	Ludogorets Razgrad	Varna
				Stadium: Ticha

15	CSKA 1948	v	Cherno More	Bistritsa
				Stadium: Bistritsa

16	Cherno More	v	Lokomotiv Sofia	Varna
				Stadium: Ticha

17	Botev Plovdiv	v	Cherno More	Plovdiv
				Stadium: Hristo Botev

18	Beroe	v	Cherno More	Stara Zagora
				Stadium: Beroe

19	Cherno More	v	CSKA Sofia	Varna
				Stadium: Ticha

20	Cherno More	v	Spartak Varna	Varna
				Stadium: Ticha

21	Lokomotiv Plovdiv	v	Cherno More	Plovdiv
				Stadium: Lokomotiv

22	Cherno More	v	Botev Vratsa	Varna
				Stadium: Ticha

23	Dobrudzha	v	Cherno More	Dobrich
				Stadium: Druzhba

24	Cherno More	v	Arda	Varna
				Stadium: Ticha

25	Septemvri Sofia	v	Cherno More	Sofia
				Stadium: Lokomotiv

26	Cherno More	v	Montana	Varna
				Stadium: Ticha

27	Levski Sofia	v	Cherno More	Sofia
				Stadium: Georgi Asparuhov

28	Cherno More	v	Slavia Sofia	Varna
				Stadium: Ticha

29	Ludogorets Razgrad	v	Cherno More	Razgrad
				Stadium: Huvepharma Arena

30	Cherno More	v	CSKA 1948	Varna
				Stadium: Ticha

=== Bulgarian Cup ===
Win Draw Loss Fixtures

=== UEFA Conference League ===
Win Draw Loss Fixtures

== Squad statistics ==
=== Appearances ===
As of pre-season

Players with no appearances are not included on the list

No.	Pos.	Nat.	Player	Parva Liga		Bulgarian Cup		UEFA Conference League		Total	
No.	Pos.	Nat.	Player	Apps	Starts	Apps	Starts	Apps	Starts	Apps	Starts

=== Goals ===
As of pre-season

Rank	Pos.	No.	Player	Parva Liga	Cup	Conference League	Total
Totals				0	0	0	0
1	ST	19					

=== Assists ===
As of pre-season

Rank	Pos.	No.	Player	Parva Liga	Cup	Conference League	Total
Totals				0	0	0	0

=== Clean sheets ===
As of pre-season

Rank	Pos.	No.	Player	Parva Liga	Cup	Conference League	Total
Totals				0	0	0	0

=== Disciplinary record ===
As of pre-season

No.	Pos.	Player	Parva Liga			Cup			Conference League			Total		
No.	Pos.	Player	Yellow card	(yellow card) (yellow-red card)	Red card	Yellow card	(yellow card) (yellow-red card)	Red card	Yellow card	(yellow card) (yellow-red card)	Red card	Yellow card	(yellow card) (yellow-red card)	Red card
Totals			0	0	0	0	0	0	0	0	0	0	0	0
