= 2024–25 Bulgarian Cup =

Sesame Купа на България

Tournament details
- Country: Bulgaria
- Teams: 48

Final positions
- Champions: Ludogorets Razgrad (4th title)
- Runners-up: CSKA Sofia

Tournament statistics
- Matches played: 49
- Goals scored: 131 (2.67 per match)
- Top goal scorer(s): (Bulgaria) Zapro Dinev (4 goals)

The 2024–25 Bulgarian Cup was the 43rd official edition of the Bulgarian annual football knockout tournament. It is sponsored by Sesame and known as the Sesame Kupa na Bulgaria for sponsorship purposes. The competition began on 13 October 2024 with the preliminary round and finished with the final on 22 May 2025. Botev Plovdiv were the defending cup winners, but were eliminated by Ludogorets Razgrad in the quarterfinals, who went on to win the cup for their fourth title in history. As Ludogorets already qualified for the first qualifying round of the 2025–26 UEFA Champions League as First League champions, the cup's first qualifying round berth for the 2025–26 UEFA Europa League was passed to the First League runners-up, Levski Sofia.

== Participating clubs ==
The following 48 teams qualified for the competition:

2024–25 First League; 16 clubs	2024–25 Second League; 16 non-reserve clubs	Winners of 4 regional competitions 16 clubs
Arda; Beroe; Botev Plovdiv; Botev Vratsa; CSKA 1948; CSKA Sofia; Cherno More; Hebar; Krumovgrad; Levski Sofia; Lokomotiv Plovdiv; Lokomotiv Sofia; Ludogorets Razgrad; Septemvri Sofia; Slavia Sofia; Spartak Varna	Belasitsa; Dobrudzha; Dunav Ruse; Etar; Fratria Varna; Lovech; Lokomotiv Gorna Oryahovitsa; Marek; Minyor Pernik; Montana; Nesebar; Pirin Blagoevgrad; Spartak Pleven; Sportist Svoge; Strumska Slava; Yantra	from North-East zone: Aksakovo; Botev Novi Pazar; Chernolomets Popovo; Septemvri Tervel; from North-West zone: Akademik Svishtov; Lokomotiv Mezdra; Kom; Levski 2007; from South-West zone: Oborishte; Vihren; Kyustendil; Rilski Sportist; from South-East zone: Chernomorets Burgas; Maritsa Plovdiv; Sayana; Rozova Dolina

== Preliminary round ==
The draw was conducted on 24 September 2024. In this stage, the participants are the 16 winners from the regional amateur competitions and 16 non-reserve teams from the Second League. The games were played on 13 October 2024.

13 October 2024	Botev Novi Pazar (III)	0–2	Fratria Varna (II)	Novi Pazar
13:00 UTC+3		Report	Andoni 62'; Totev 71'	Stadium: Gradski stadion Referee: Stanimir Todorov (Gabrovo)

13 October 2024	Levski 2007 (III)	2−3 (a.e.t.)	Sportist Svoge (II)	Levski
15:00 UTC+3	Borisov 44'; Hristov 84'	Report	Clifford 13', 52'; Veselinski 98'	Stadium: Gradski stadion Referee: Stoyan Arsov (Sofia)

13 October 2024	Akademik Svishtov (III)	1−1 (a.e.t.) (2−3 p)	Montana (II)	Svishtov
15:00 UTC+3	Petrov 43'	Report	Rusinov 63'	Stadium: Stadion Akademik; Referee: Vladimir Kirilov (Pleven)
	Penalties
	Petrov (penalty missed); Nikolov (penalty missed); Ivanov (penalty scored); Mitev (penalty missed); Lenkov (penalty scored)		(penalty missed) Kamenov; (penalty scored) Todorov; (penalty scored) Tsekov; (penalty missed) Burov; (penalty scored) Borisov

13 October 2024	Rilski Sportist (III)	1−3 (a.e.t.)	Dunav Ruse (II)	Samokov
15:00 UTC+3	Dolapchiev 73'	Report	Zakonov 62'; Gospodinov 96'; Minchev 107'	Stadium: Stadion Iskar; Referee: Lyubomir Vushovski (Sofia)

13 October 2024	Aksakovo (III)	0−4	Yantra (II)	Aksakovo
15:00 UTC+3		Report	Ivanov 37'; Raynov 41'; Dyulgerov 57'; Radev 75'	Stadium: Stadion Aksakovo; Referee: Svetoslav Lazarov (Burgas)

13 October 2024	Kom (III)	0−4	Pirin Blagoevgrad (II)	Berkovitsa
15:00 UTC+3		Report	Dinev 19', 51', 81', 83'	Stadium: Stadion Mramor; Referee: Martin Markov (Sofia)

13 October 2024	Kyustendil (III)	3−1	Marek (II)	Kyustendil
15:00 UTC+3	Iliev 44'; Stoichkov 84'; Aleksandrov 87'	Report	Dimitrov 20'	Stadium: Stadion Osogovo; Referee: Dimitar Burov (Sofia)

13 October 2024	Chernolomets Popovo (III)	3−0	Lovech (II)	Popovo
15:00 UTC+3	Kostov 47'; Beadirov 57'; Stoilov 65'	Report		Stadium: Stadion Stamo Kostov; Referee: Todor Kirov (Varna)

13 October 2024	Sayana (III)	2−2 (a.e.t.) (4−2 p)	Lokomotiv Gorna Oryahovitsa (II)	Haskovo
15:00 UTC+3	Marchev 26', 71'	Report	Peev 7' (o.g.); Angelov 13' (o.g.)	Stadium: Stadion Haskovo; Referee: Denislav Stalev (Plovdiv)
	Penalties
	Marchev (penalty scored); Uzunov (penalty scored); Iliev (penalty scored); Angelov (penalty scored)		(penalty missed) Dechev; (penalty missed) Kolev; (penalty scored) Avramov; (penalty scored) Laskov

13 October 2024	Maritsa Plovdiv (III)	1−2	Belasitsa (II)	Plovdiv
15:00 UTC+3	Domovchiyski 46' (pen.)	Report	Sadik 33'; Karachorov 79'	Stadium: Stadion Maritsa; Referee: Kristina Georgieva (Sofia)

13 October 2024	Lokomotiv Mezdra (III)	0−0 (a.e.t.) (4−3 p)	Nesebar (II)	Mezdra
15:00 UTC+3		Report		Stadium: Stadion Lokomotiv; Referee: Mihael Pavlov (Veliko Tarnovo)
	Penalties
	Sapundzhiev (penalty missed); Beshev (penalty scored); Dimitrov (penalty scored); Iliev (penalty scored); Ganchev (penalty scored)		(penalty missed) Hristov; (penalty scored) Pyuskyulyu; (penalty scored) Gelin; (penalty missed) Slivov; (penalty scored) Dimov

13 October 2024	Rozova Dolina (III)	2−1	Strumska Slava (II)	Kazanlak
15:00 UTC+3	Ivanov 26'; Mitov 75'	Report	Karshakov 71'	Stadium: Stadion Sevtopolis; Referee: Dimo Dimov (Sliven)

13 October 2024	Chernomorets Burgas (III)	2−0	Etar (II)	Burgas
15:00 UTC+3	Malamov 27'; Petkov 36'	Report		Stadium: Stadion Ivan Pritargov; Referee: Georgi Stoyanov (Plovdiv)

13 October 2024	Septemvri Tervel (III)	0−3	Dobrudzha (II)	Tervel
15:00 UTC+3		Report	Ivanov 27', 68'; Rumenov 71' (pen.)	Stadium: Stadion Septemvri; Referee: Kristiyan Todorov (Varna)

13 October 2024	Vihren (III)	1−2	Minyor Pernik (II)	Sandanski
15:00 UTC+3	Sydorenko 44'	Report	Vutsov 31'; Semerdzhiev 71' (pen.)	Stadium: Stadion Spartak; Referee: Ivan Ivanov (Sofia)

13 October 2024	Oborishte (III)	2−1 (a.e.t.)	Spartak Pleven (II)	Panagyurishte
15:00 UTC+3	Bozhilov 5'; Pantaleev 106'	Report	Shopov 56'	Stadium: Stadion Orcho Voivoda; Referee: Hristiyana Guteva (Sofia)

== Round of 32 ==
The draw for this stage was conducted on 24 September 2024. The participants are the 16 preliminary round winners and the 16 First League teams. The games were played between 28 October and 14 November 2024.

28 October 2024	Chernomorets Burgas (III)	1−1 (a.e.t.) (2−4 p)	Lokomotiv Plovdiv (I)	Burgas
13:30 UTC+2	Petkov 78'	Report	Perea 51'	Stadium: efbet Arena (Note: Chernomorets Burgas plays their Round of 32 home match at efbet Arena, Burgas, instead of their regular stadium, Stadion Ivan Pritargov in Burgas, which does not have the capacity to host the away fans.); Referee: Petar Kuzev (Gabrovo)
	Penalties
	Chavorski (penalty missed); Petkov (penalty scored); Malamov (penalty missed); Mihov (penalty scored)		(penalty scored) Perea; (penalty scored) H. Ivanov; (penalty missed) Lyaskov; (penalty scored) Ali; (penalty scored) I. Ivanov

29 October 2024	Dobrudzha (II)	0−4	CSKA Sofia (I)	Dobrich
13:30 UTC+2		Report	Iliev 17'; Carreazo 24'; Heintz 58'; Koyalipou 71' (pen.)	Stadium: Stadion Druzhba; Referee: Valentin Zhelezov (Burgas)

29 October 2024	Sportist Svoge (II)	0−2	Botev Vratsa (I)	Svoge
13:30 UTC+2		Report	Marinov 18'; Smolenski 25'	Stadium: Stadion Chavdar Tsvetkov; Referee: Martin Markov (Sofia)

29 October 2024	Yantra (II)	0−1	Lokomotiv Sofia (I)	Gabrovo
13:30 UTC+2		Report	Brrou 30'	Stadium: Stadion Hristo Botev; Referee: Stoyan Arsov (Sofia)

29 October 2024	Sayana (III)	0−4	Spartak Varna (I)	Haskovo
13:30 UTC+2		Report	Ivey 14'; Rivollier 30'; Vutov 37' (pen.); Ahmedov 45+1'	Stadium: Stadion Haskovo; Referee: Lyubomir Vushovski (Sofia)

29 October 2024	Lokomotiv Mezdra (III)	2−1 (a.e.t.)	Septemvri Sofia (I)	Mezdra
13:30 UTC+2	Georgiev 40'; Kaloyanov 99' (pen.)	Report	Veličkovski 29'	Stadium: Stadion Lokomotiv; Referee: Vladimir Valkov (Plovdiv)

29 October 2024	Rozova Dolina (III)	1−2	Arda (I)	Kazanlak
13:30 UTC+2	Ivanov 32'	Report	Yordanov 5' (pen.); Kazakov 7'	Stadium: Stadion Sevtopolis; Referee: Kristiyan Kolev (Plovdiv)

29 October 2024	Montana (II)	1−3	Slavia Sofia (I)	Montana
17:00 UTC+2	Ejike 88'	Report	Fabien 62', 71'; Jelenković 82'	Stadium: Stadion Ogosta; Referee: Dragomir Draganov (Varna)

30 October 2024	Oborishte (III)	0−1	Krumovgrad (I)	Panagyurishte
13:30 UTC+2		Report	O. Yusein 2'	Stadium: Stadion Orcho Voivoda; Referee: Georgi Stoyanov (Plovdiv)

30 October 2024	Kyustendil (III)	0−4	Cherno More (I)	Kyustendil
13:30 UTC+2		Report	Weslen 6' (pen.); Popov 35'; Panayotov 41'; Beyhan 70'	Stadium: Stadion Osogovo; Referee: Nikola Popov (Sofia)

30 October 2024	Dunav Ruse (II)	0−0 (a.e.t.) (11−10 p)	Hebar (I)	Ruse
17:00 UTC+2		Report		Stadium: Gradski stadion Referee: Todor Kirov (Varna)
	Penalties
	Hadzhiev (penalty scored); Apostolov (penalty scored); Vangelov (penalty scored); Veshev (penalty scored); Zakonov (penalty scored); Hasan (penalty scored); Minchev (penalty scored); Dichev (penalty scored); Todorov (penalty scored); Gospodinov (penalty scored); Goshev (penalty scored)		(penalty scored) Penchev; (penalty scored) Mihaylov; (penalty scored) Krastev; (penalty scored) Makni; (penalty scored) Zbun; (penalty scored) Pehlivanov; (penalty scored) Gamakov; (penalty scored) Nikolaev; (penalty scored) Fonkeu; (penalty scored) Staykov; (penalty missed) Rosa

30 October 2024	Pirin Blagoevgrad (II)	0−2 (a.e.t.)	Levski Sofia (I)	Blagoevgrad
17:00 UTC+2		Report	Bachev 97'; Sangaré 103'	Stadium: Stadion Hristo Botev; Referee: Vasil Minev (Sofia)

31 October 2024	Belasitsa (II)	0−5	CSKA 1948 (I)	Petrich
13:30 UTC+2		Report	Ilievski 31'; Bouzon 40'; Kirilov 67'; Furtado 78'; Dudu 88'	Stadium: Stadion Tsar Samuil; Referee: Dimitar Dimitrov (Sofia)

31 October 2024	Minyor Pernik (II)	0−1	Botev Plovdiv (I)	Pernik
13:30 UTC+2		Report	Kassi 26'	Stadium: Stadion Minyor; Referee: Volen Chinkov (Sofia)

31 October 2024	Chernolomets Popovo (III)	0−6	Ludogorets Razgrad (I)	Razgrad (Note: Chernolomets Popovo requested to play its Round of 32 home match at Huvepharma Arena, Razgrad, instead of their regular stadium Stadion Stamo Kostov in Popovo.)
17:00 UTC+2		Report	Rusev 14'; Tissera 18'; Caio Vidal 37', 82'; Camara 41'; Delev 55'	Stadium: Huvepharma Arena; Referee: Mihael Pavlov (Veliko Tarnovo)

14 November 2024	Fratria Varna (II)	3−3 (a.e.t.) (2−4 p)	Beroe (I)	Albena
13:30 UTC+2	Angelov 24'; Dobrev 49'; Druiventak 71'	Report	Ceijas 12'; Algarra 33'; Salido 87'	Stadium: Stadion Albena 1 Referee: Georgi Davidov (Veliko Tarnovo)
	Penalties
	Kadir (penalty missed); Andoni (penalty scored); Ibryam (penalty missed); Dobrev (penalty scored)		(penalty missed) Algarra; (penalty scored) Pachame; (penalty scored) Ceijas; (penalty scored) Godoy; (penalty scored) Ferrer

== Round of 16 ==
The draw was conducted on 7 November 2024. The games were played between 13 and 16 December 2024. In this stage the participants are the 16 winners from the previous round.

13 December 2024	Lokomotiv Mezdra (III)	0−1	Botev Vratsa (I)	Mezdra
13:00 UTC+2		Report	Smolenski 54'	Stadium: Stadion Lokomotiv; Referee: Hristiyana Guteva (Sofia)

13 December 2024	Beroe (I)	2−0	Lokomotiv Plovdiv (I)	Stara Zagora
16:00 UTC+2	Salido 22'; Pineda 57'	Report		Stadium: Stadion Beroe; Attendance: 893; Referee: Mihael Pavlov (Veliko Tarnovo)

14 December 2024	Cherno More (I)	1−0	Slavia Sofia (I)	Varna
13:00 UTC+2	Jelenković 75' (o.g.)	Report		Stadium: Stadion Ticha; Referee: Georgi Kabakov (Plovdiv)

14 December 2024	Levski Sofia (I)	1−0	Dunav Ruse (II)	Sofia
16:00 UTC+2	Tsunami 77'	Report		Stadium: Stadion Georgi Asparuhov; Referee: Lyuboslav Lyubomirov (Pernik)

15 December 2024	Lokomotiv Sofia (I)	1−5	Botev Plovdiv (I)	Sofia
13:00 UTC+2	Pitsolis 59'	Report	Maraš 10'; Orachev 32' (o.g.); Akere 36'; Popov 63'; Kassi 80'	Stadium: Stadion Lokomotiv; Referee: Martin Velikov (Varna)

15 December 2024	Spartak Varna (I)	2−3	CSKA Sofia (I)	Varna
16:00 UTC+2	Ahmedov 3'; Mitev 25'	Report	Iseka 27'; Bytyqi 32'; Dellova 78'	Stadium: Stadion Spartak; Attendance: 4,734; Referee: Radoslav Gidzhenov (Plovdiv)

16 December 2024	Krumovgrad (I)	0−2	Arda (I)	Plovdiv (Note: Krumovgrad will play their round of 16 home game at Sporten kompleks Nikola Shterev - Starika, Plovdiv, instead of their regular stadium Stadion Krumovgrad, Krumovgrad, which does not meet the BFU requirements.)
13:00 UTC+2		Report	Offor 54' (pen.); Kotev 77'	Stadium: Sporten kompleks Nikola Shterev - Starika; Attendance: 102; Referee: Mariyan Grebencharski (Samokov)

16 December 2024	CSKA 1948 (I)	2−3	Ludogorets Razgrad (I)	Bistritsa
16:00 UTC+2	Kirilov 12', 63'	Report	Camara 35'; Kurtulus 77'; Chochev 90+2'	Stadium: Stadion Bistritsa; Referee: Vasil Minev (Sofia)

== Quarter-finals ==
The draw was conducted on 18 December 2024. The games were played between 25 and 27 February 2025. In this stage the participants were the 8 winners from the previous round.

25 February 2025	Botev Vratsa	0−0 (a.e.t.) (4−2 p)	Beroe	Vratsa
18:00 UTC+2		Report		Stadium: Stadion Hristo Botev; Referee: Nikola Popov (Sofia)
	Penalties
	Perea (penalty scored); Genov (penalty scored); Traorè (penalty scored); Stoyanov (penalty scored)		(penalty missed) Ceijas; (penalty scored) Squadrone; (penalty scored) Salido; (penalty missed) Godoy

26 February 2025	Cherno More	1−0	Levski Sofia	Varna
15:00 UTC+2	Tonev 87'	Report		Stadium: Stadion Ticha; Referee: Georgi Ginchev (Veliko Tarnovo)

26 February 2025	CSKA Sofia	2−1	Arda	Sofia
18:00 UTC+2	Viyachki 21' (o.g.); Pittas 37'	Report	Pinto 71' (o.g.)	Stadium: Natsionalen stadion Vasil Levski (Note: From the spring of 2024 CSKA plays their home games at Natsionalen stadion Vasil Levski, Sofia, instead of their regular stadium Stadion Balgarska Armia, Sofia, which is undergoing a major reconstruction.); Attendance: 2,576; Referee: Valentin Zhelezov (Burgas)

27 February 2025	Ludogorets Razgrad	0−0 (a.e.t.) (4−2 p)	Botev Plovdiv	Razgrad
18:00 UTC+2		Report		Stadium: Huvepharma Arena; Attendance: 1,022; Referee: Krasen Georgiev (Varna)
	Penalties
	Piotrowski (penalty scored); Rusev (penalty scored); Yordanov (penalty scored); Erick Marcus (penalty scored)		(penalty scored) Iliev; (penalty missed) Balogiannis; (penalty missed) Chernev; (penalty scored) Maraš

== Semi-finals ==
The draw was conducted on 27 February 2025. The first legs are to be played on 9 and 10 April, while the second legs are scheduled for 22 and 23 April 2025.

=== First legs ===
9 April 2025	Cherno More	0−0	CSKA Sofia	Varna
19:00 UTC+3		Report		Stadium: Stadion Ticha; Attendance: 6,211; Referee: Georgi Kabakov (Plovdiv)

10 April 2025	Botev Vratsa	0−1	Ludogorets Razgrad	Vratsa
19:00 UTC+3		Report	Duah 66'	Stadium: Stadion Hristo Botev; Attendance: 1,121; Referee: Dragomir Draganov (Varna)

=== Second legs ===
22 April 2025	CSKA Sofia	2−1 (2−1 agg.)	Cherno More	Sofia
19:00 UTC+3	Pittas 26', 45+1'	Report	Beyhan 87'	Stadium: Natsionalen stadion Vasil Levski; Attendance: 8,211; Referee: Radoslav Gidzhenov (Plovdiv)

23 April 2025	Ludogorets Razgrad	2−0 (3−0 agg.)	Botev Vratsa	Razgrad
19:00 UTC+3	Camara 6'; Baroan 22'	Report		Stadium: Huvepharma Arena; Attendance: 1,985; Referee: Volen Chinkov (Sofia)

== Final ==
22 May 2025
19:00 UTC+3

Ludogorets Razgrad	1−0	CSKA Sofia
Caio Vidal 34'	Report

Vasil Levski National Stadium, Sofia
Attendance: 37,455
Referee: Georgi Kabakov (Plovdiv)
