= Ventsislav Ivanov =

Ventsislav Ivanov may refer to:

- Ventsislav Ivanov (footballer, born 1982)
- Ventsislav Ivanov (footballer, born 1995)
