= Breno Teixeira =

Breno Teixeira may refer to:

- Breno Teixeira (footballer, born 2000), Portuguese football left-back for Anadia
- Breno Teixeira (footballer, born 2002), Brazilian football forward for Cherno More
