= Dudu Rodrigues =

Brazilian footballer

Personal information
- Full name: Eduardo Fernandes Rodrigues de Souza
- Date of birth: 17 July 2002 (age 24)
- Place of birth: Nova Iguaçu, Brazil
- Height: 1.74 m (5 ft 9 in)
- Position: Winger

Team information
- Current team: Akron Tolyatti (on loan from Aris)
- Number: 11

Youth career
- 2014–2020: Nova Iguaçu
- 2021–2023: Artsul
- 2021–2023: → Botafogo (loan)

Senior career*
| Years | Team | Apps | (Gls) |
| 2023–2024 | Botafogo | 1 | (0) |
| 2024 | → Democrata (loan) | 3 | (0) |
| 2024 | Aparecidense | 10 | (2) |
| 2024–2025 | Cherno More | 17 | (5) |
| 2025– | Aris | 27 | (5) |
| 2026– | → Akron Tolyatti (loan) | 12 | (1) |
- * Club domestic league appearances and goals as of 8 November 2026

Eduardo Fernandes Rodrigues de Souza (born 17 July 2002), simply known as Dudu or Dudu Rodrigues, is a Brazilian professional footballer who plays as a winger for Russian Premier League club Akron Tolyatti on loan from the Greek club Aris.

== Career ==
Born in Nova Iguaçu, Dudu played for Nova Iguaçu FC and Artsul in his hometown, before moving to Botafogo at age 19.

Dudu signed for Bulgarian club Cherno More in June 2024 and made his competitive debut in the first round of the 2024–25 season against CSKA 1948. He scored his first goal for Cherno More and was named Man of the Match in the 2–0 away win against Spartak Varna in the Varna derby.

On 19 July 2026, Dudu was loaned by Russian Premier League club Akron Tolyatti for the 2026–27 season, with an option to buy.

== Career statistics ==
As of 8 November 2026

| Club | Season | League | | | Cup | | Continental | | Other | | Total | |
| Club | Season | Division | Apps | Goals | Apps | Goals | Apps | Goals | Apps | Goals | Apps | Goals |
|---|---|---|---|---|---|---|---|---|---|---|---|---|
| Botafogo | 2023 | Campeonato Brasileiro Série A | 0 | 0 | 0 | 0 | 0 | 0 | 1 (Note: Appearance in Campeonato Carioca) | 0 | 1 | 0 |
| Democrata (loan) | 2024 | Campeonato Mineiro | — | | — | | — | | 3 (Note: Appearances in Campeonato Mineiro) | 0 | 3 | 0 |
| Aparecidense | 2024 | Campeonato Brasileiro Série C | 6 | 2 | — | | — | | 4 (Note: Appearances in Campeonato Goiano) | 0 | 10 | 2 |
| Cherno More | 2024–25 | First Professional Football League | 17 | 5 | 1 | 0 | 2 (Note: Appearances in UEFA Conference League) | 0 | — | | 20 | 5 |
| Aris | 2024–25 | Super League Greece | 3 | 0 | — | | — | | 4 (Note: Appearances in Europe play-offs) | 2 | 7 | 2 |
| Aris | 2025–26 | Super League Greece | 16 | 2 | 4 | 1 | 1 | 0 | 4 | 1 | 25 | 4 |
| Aris | Total | | 19 | 2 | 4 | 1 | 1 | 0 | 8 | 3 | 32 | 6 |
| Akron Tolyatti (loan) | 2026–27 | Russian Premier League | 12 | 1 | 3 | 0 | — | | — | | 15 | 1 |
| Career total | | | 54 | 10 | 8 | 1 | 3 | 0 | 12 | 3 | 77 | 14 |
