= Berk Beyhan =

Bulgarian footballer

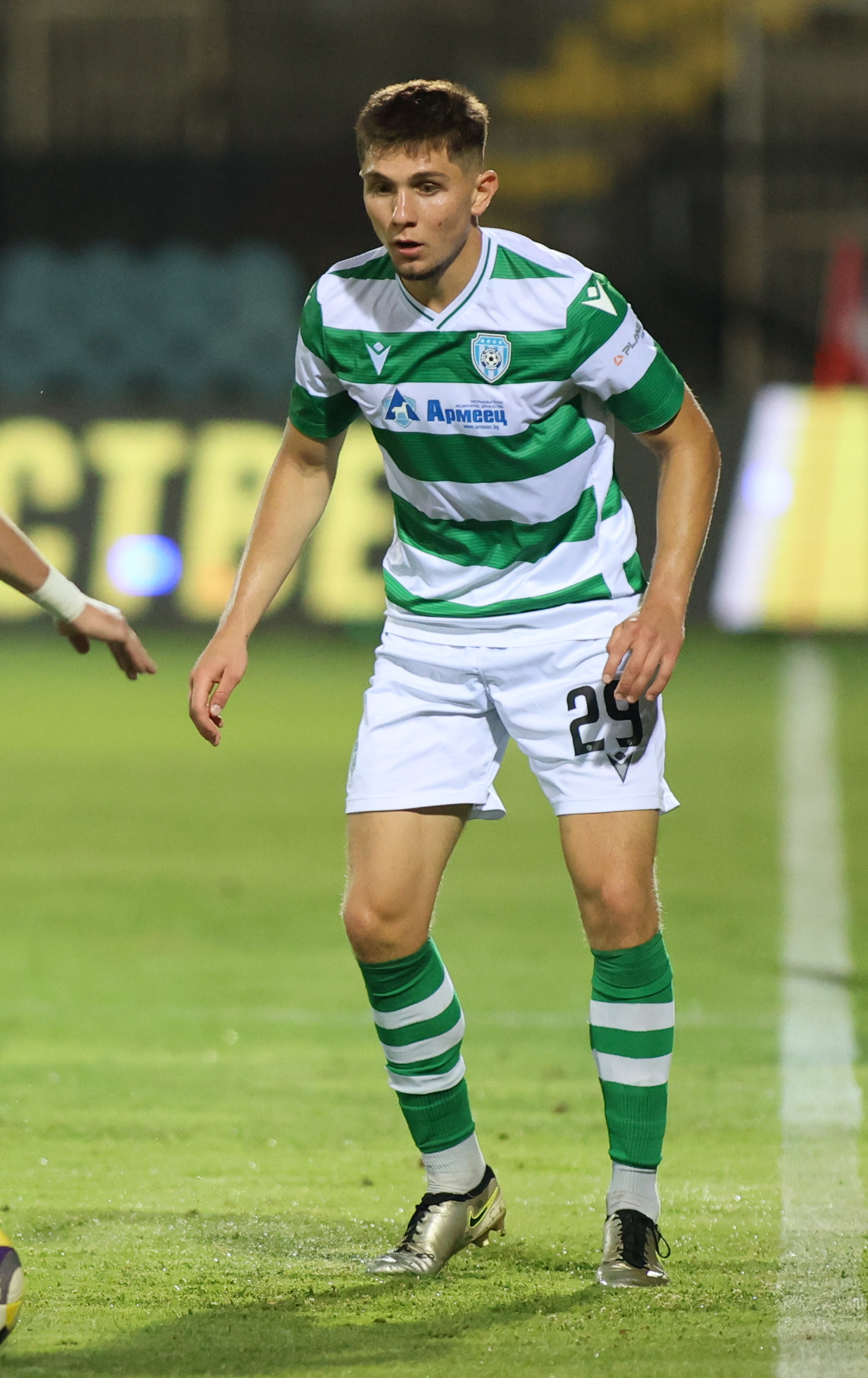

Personal information
- Full name: Berk Orhan Beyhan
- Date of birth: 29 October 2004 (age 22)
- Place of birth: Varna, Bulgaria
- Height: 1.84 m (6 ft 0 in)
- Position: Defensive midfielder

Team information
- Current team: Cherno More
- Number: 29

Youth career
- 2013–2023: Cherno More

Senior career*
Years	Team	Apps	(Gls)
2022–2024	Cherno More II	49	(10)
2023–	Cherno More	54	(2)

International career^{‡}
2024–	Bulgaria U21	6	(0)
2026–	Bulgaria	2	(0)
- * Club domestic league appearances and goals as of 22:10, 23 September 2026 (UTC) ‡ National team caps and goals as of 5 June 2026

Berk Orhan Beyhan (Bulgarian: Берк Орхан Бейхан; born 29 October 2004) is a Bulgarian professional footballer who plays as a defensive midfielder for First League club Cherno More Varna and the Bulgaria national team.

== Club career ==
=== Cherno More II ===
In the summer of 2022 after playing for all youth formations of Cherno More Berk Beyhan became a part of the newly formed Cherno More II squad for the new 2022–23 Third North-East League season. On 14 August 2022, Beyhan was a part of Cherno More's second team debut in men's football playin 90 minutes in a 2–1 win against Ustrem Donchevo. On 5 March 2023, Beyhan scored his first goal against Dunav Ruse II in a 7–0 win scoring 2 goals. Beyhan played there for 3 years being a regular starter before starting to play regularly for the first team.

=== Cherno More ===
Beyhan made his first-team debut for Cherno More on 17 March 2023, coming on as a substitute in a 3–0 league win over Septemvri Sofia. On 15 June 2023, he signed his first professional contract with the club. In the 2023–24 season Beyhan was used primarily as a rotational player only playing 8 matches.

Beyhan began to establish himself in the Cherno More first team from the 2024–25 season, making 15 starts in the league. On 30 October 2024, he scored his first goal in a 4–0 away win against Kyustendil in the Bulgarian Cup. On 3 November 2024, Beyhan played his first match as a starter in a 2–1 win against Levski Sofia, playing 70 minutes. On 2 March 2025, he scored his first league goal in a 0–1 last minute winner against Hebar Pazardzhik. On 1 May 2025, Cherno More legend and capitan Daniel Dimov after he announced his retirement said in an interview that Beyhan will be his replacement.

On 19 July 2025, Beyhan signed a new contract with Cherno More, lasting until at 2028. In the 2025–26 season Beyhan struggled with injuries and played only 6 matches in the first half-season.

== International career ==
=== Youth national team ===
On 2 November 2024 Berk Beyhan was called up for the Bulgaria national under-21 team. On 15 November 2024 Beyhan made his debut in a friendly match against Turkey coming on at half-time. On 19 November 2024 made his first match as a starter against Bosnia and Herzegovina playing 78 minutes. Beyhan was called up 2 more times playing a total of 6 matches not scoring in any of them.

=== Senior national team ===
On 16 March 2026, Beyhan received his first call up to the Bulgarian senior team. On 27 March 2026 Beyhan debuted for the senior national team in a 10–2 win against the Solomon Islands in the FIFA Series, coming on at half time.

== Career statistics ==
As of 26 May 2026

Appearances and goals by competition
Club	Season	League			Cup		Continental		Total	
Club	Season	Division	Apps	Goals	Apps	Goals	Apps	Goals	Apps	Goals
Cherno More II	2022–23	Third League	25	5	—		—		25	5
Cherno More II	2023–24	Third League	18	3	—		—		18	3
Cherno More II	2024–25	Third League	6	2	—		—		6	2
Cherno More II	Total		49	10	0	0	0	0	49	10
Cherno More	2022–23	First League	1	0	0	0	—		1	0
Cherno More	2023–24	First League	8	0	1	0	—		9	0
Cherno More	2024–25	First League	21	1	5	2	1	0	27	3
Cherno More	2025–26	First League	19	1	1	0	0	0	20	1
Cherno More	2026–27	First League	0	0	0	0	—		0	0
Cherno More	Total		49	2	7	2	1	0	57	4
Career total			98	12	7	2	1	0	106	14

=== International ===
As of match played 5 June 2026

Appearances and goals by national team and year
National team	Year	Apps	Goals
Bulgaria
Bulgaria	2026	2	0
Total		2	0
