= Emanuil Nyagolov =

Bulgarian footballer (born 2008)

Personal information
- Full name: Emanuil Stiliyanov Nyagolov
- Date of birth: 17 August 2008 (age 18)
- Place of birth: Varna, Bulgaria
- Height: 1.78 m (5 ft 10 in)
- Positions: Left back; winger

Team information
- Current team: Cherno More
- Number: 13

Youth career
- 2016–2025: Cherno More

Senior career*
Years	Team	Apps	(Gls)
2025–	Cherno More II	19	(3)
2025–	Cherno More	3	(0)

International career^{‡}
2024–2025	Bulgaria U17	4	(0)
2025–	Bulgaria U19	6	(0)
2026–	Bulgaria U21	1	(0)
- * Club domestic league appearances and goals as of 17:22, 1 June 2026 (UTC) ‡ National team caps and goals as of 19:58, 1 June 2026 (UTC)

Emanuil Nyagolov (Bulgarian: Емануил Няголов; born 17 August 2008) is a Bulgarian professional footballer who plays as a left back or winger for First League club Cherno More Varna.

== Career ==
Nyagolov joined Cherno More's academy at the age of eight before signing his first professional contract with the club on 8 July 2025. He was promoted to the reserve team for the 2025–26 season. On 17 August 2025, on his 17th birthday, he made his senior debut with Cherno More II in a 2–1 Third League win over Aksakovo.

On 9 May 2026, Nyagolov made his official senior debut for Cherno More's first team in a 2–0 First League win against Botev Plovdiv, playing full 90 minutes.

== International career ==
Nyagolov played for the Bulgaria U17 team between October 2024 and April 2025. He was called up for the Bulgaria U19 team in June 2025.

On 27 May 2026, Nyagolov received his first call-up to the Bulgaria U21 squad, and made his debut during a 1–0 win against North Macedonia on 30 May 2026.

== Career statistics ==
=== Club ===
As of 1 June 2026

Club	Division	Season	League		Cup		Europe		Total	
Club	Division	Season	Apps	Goals	Apps	Goals	Apps	Goals	Apps	Goals
Cherno More II	Third League	2025–26	19	3	—		—		19	3
Cherno More II	Third League	2026–27	0	0	—		—		0	0
Cherno More II	Total		19	3	0	0	0	0	19	3
Cherno More	First League	2025–26	3	0	0	0	0	0	3	0
Cherno More	First League	2026–27	0	0	0	0	0	0	0	0
Cherno More	Total		3	0	0	0	0	0	3	0
Career Total			22	3	0	0	0	0	22	3
