= Cherno More Sports Complex =

Football training ground in Varna, Bulgaria

- Former names: Korabostroitel Stadium (1992-2007)
- Location: Asparuhovo, Varna, Bulgaria
- Owner: TIM, Chimimport AD
- Operator: Cherno More II
- Capacity: 1,500
- Surface: Grass
- Field size: 102 x 65 m

Construction
- Groundbreaking: 1992
- Opened: 1993

Tenants
- FC Fearplay (1992–2004); Cherno More Academy (2005–present); Cherno More II (2022–present)

The Cherno More Sports Complex is a football training ground located in the Asparuhovo district of Varna, Bulgaria. Cherno More Sports Complex is the home ground of the Cherno More II and the academy of Cherno More. The stadium is located below the Asparuhov Bridge and has a capacity of 1,500 spectators.

Until 2007, the stadium was named "Korabostroitel" and then was renamed to "Cherno More Sports Complex".

It has one main pitch used for Bulgarian Reserves League matches and training (also junior training and matches) and one training pitch with synthetic grass used for junior team training and matches.
