= David Teles =

Portuguese footballer

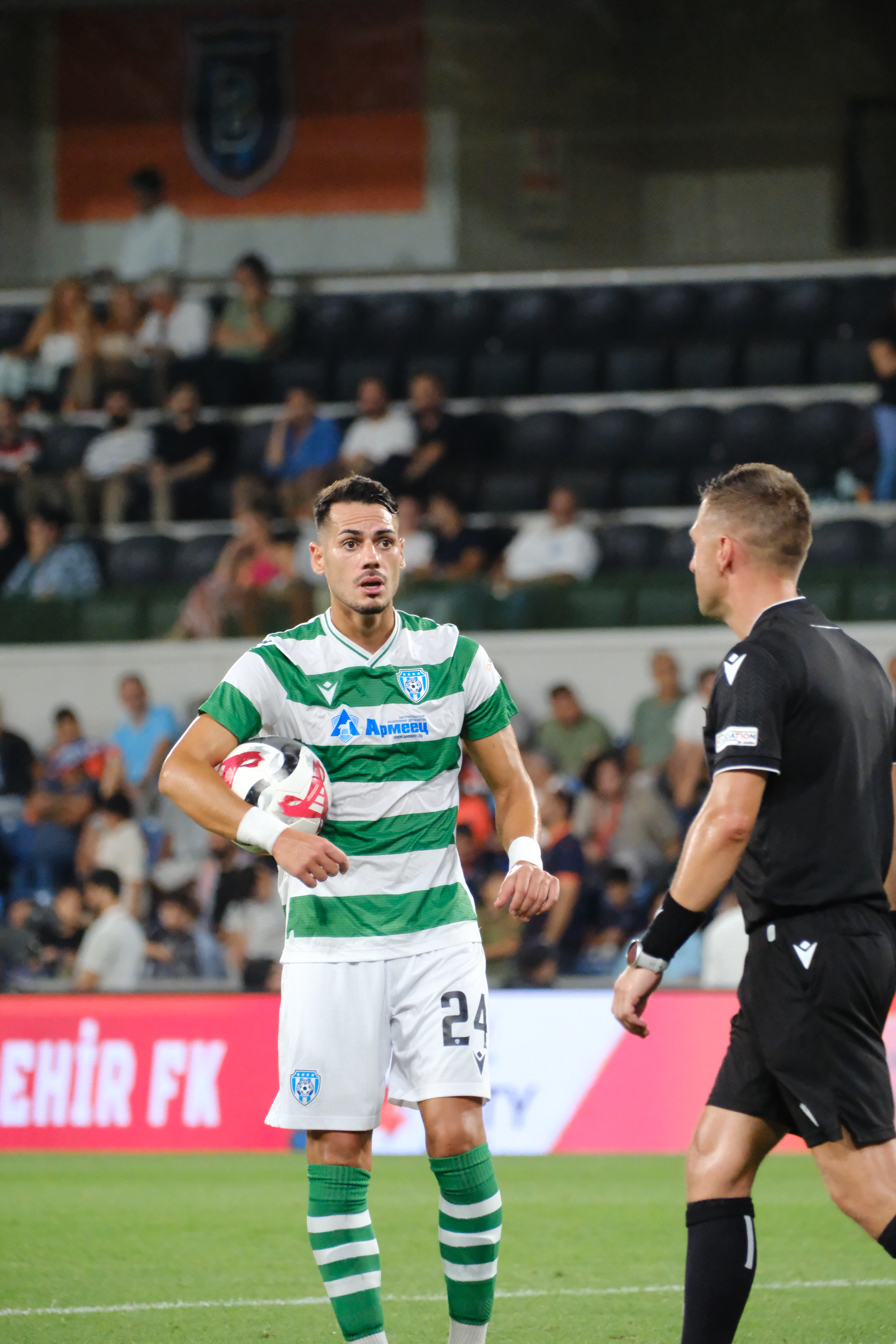
- Teles in 2025

Personal information
- Full name: David Miguel Delfino Teles
- Date of birth: 23 May 1998 (age 28)
- Place of birth: Elvas, Portugal
- Height: 1.79 m (5 ft 10 in)
- Position: Midfielder

Team information
- Current team: Cherno More
- Number: 24

Youth career
- 2007–2014: O Elvas
- 2014–2015: Sporting CP
- 2015–2017: Académica de Coimbra

Senior career*
Years	Team	Apps	(Gls)
2017–2019	Académica de Coimbra	2	(0)
2019–2020	Clube Condeixa	23	(2)
2020–2022	Sintrense	33	(7)
2022–2024	Académica de Coimbra	52	(4)
2024–2025	Anadia	23	(0)
2025–	Cherno More	38	(2)
- * Club domestic league appearances and goals as of 22 August 2026

David Miguel Delfino Teles (born 23 May 1998) is a Portuguese professional footballer who plays as a midfielder for Bulgarian First League club Cherno More Varna.

== Career ==
On 23 July 2017, Teles made his professional debut with Académica de Coimbra in a 2017–18 Taça da Liga match against Arouca. He subsequently made his 2017–18 LigaPro debut in August 2017 as a substitute against União Madeira.

On 5 July 2025, Teles signed a contract with Bulgarian club Cherno More Varna. He made his competitive debut for the club in the team's opening game of the 2025–26 First League season – a 1–1 draw against Lokomotiv Sofia on 18 July 2025.
