= Xande =

Xande is a nickname, generally a short composition to given name Alexandre. Notable people with the name include:

- Xande (footballer), a Brazilian footballer
- Xande de Pilares, a Brazilian singer
  - Xande Canta Caetano, an album from the singer
- Xande Ribeiro, a Brazilian wrestler
- Xande Silva (born 1997), Portuguese footballer
