= Dani Martín (footballer, born 1997) =

Spanish footballer

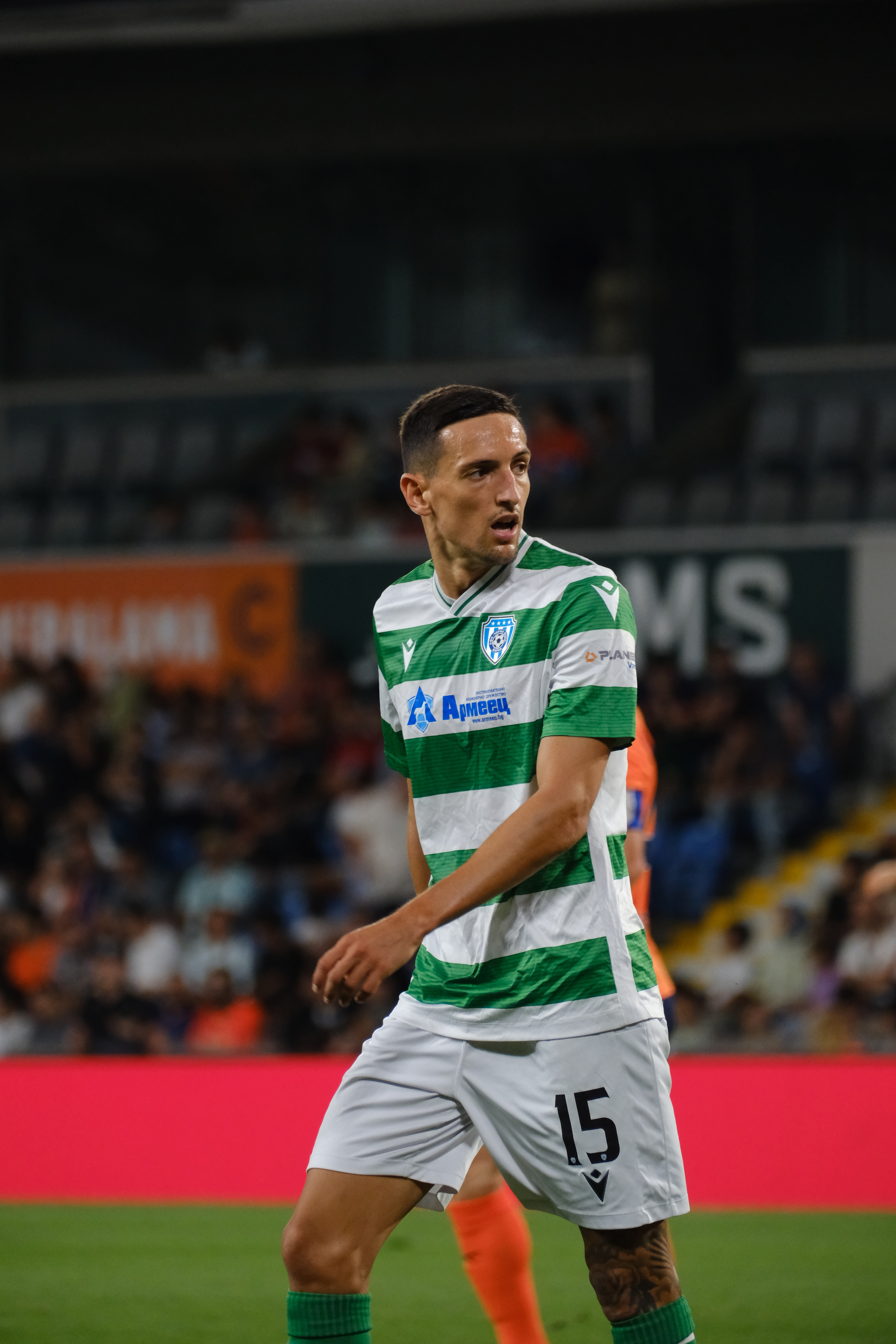

Personal information
- Full name: Daniel Jesús Martín Gil
- Date of birth: 31 May 1997 (age 29)
- Place of birth: Las Palmas, Spain
- Height: 1.75 m (5 ft 9 in)
- Position: Left back

Youth career
- 2005–2016: Las Palmas

Senior career*
Years	Team	Apps	(Gls)
2015–2018	Las Palmas C		
2017–2021	Las Palmas B	64	(0)
2019	Las Palmas	1	(0)
2021–2022	CS Puertollano	28	(2)
2022–2024	Melilla	48	(2)
2024–2026	Cherno More	68	(3)
- * Club domestic league appearances and goals as of 13 October 2026

Daniel Jesús "Dani" Martín Gil (born 31 May 1997), sometimes known as Dani Flaco, is a Spanish professional footballer who plays as a left back.

== Club career ==
Born in Las Palmas, Canary Islands, Martín joined UD Las Palmas' youth setup in 2005, aged eight. He made his senior debut with the C-team during the 2015–16 season, in the regional leagues.

Martín was definitely promoted to the reserves in Segunda División B ahead of the 2018–19 campaign, but was only sparingly used. On 20 July 2019, he signed a new one-year deal with the club, and became a regular starter for the B's afterwards.

Martín made his first team debut on 17 November 2019, starting in a 1–2 away loss against CD Mirandés in the Segunda División championship. On 31 August 2021, he moved to Segunda División RFEF side Calvo Sotelo Puertollano CF.
