= Edgar Pacheco (footballer, born 2000) =

Portuguese footballer

Personal information
- Full name: Edgar Patrício Franco Pacheco
- Date of birth: 23 June 2000 (age 26)
- Place of birth: Lisbon, Portugal
- Height: 1.71 m (5 ft 7 in)
- Position: Winger

Team information
- Current team: Atlético CP
- Number: 20

Youth career
- 2009–2016: Agualva
- 2016–2018: Real S.C.
- 2018–2019: Alverca
- 2019–2020: Belenenses-SAD

Senior career*
Years	Team	Apps	(Gls)
2020–2021	Belenenses-SAD II	20	(5)
2021–2023	Belenenses-SAD	22	(5)
2023–2025	Cherno More	51	(1)
2025–2026	Differdange 03	15	(2)
2026–	Atlético CP	0	(0)
- * Club domestic league appearances and goals as of 13 September 2026

Edgar Patrício Franco Pacheco (born 23 June 2000) is a Portuguese professional footballer who plays as a winger for Liga 3 club Atlético CP.

== Personal life ==
Pacheco is the son of the Portuguese-Angolan former footballer Edgar Patrício de Carvalho Pacheco.

== Career ==
On 28 February 2023, Pacheco signed a contract with Cherno More Varna in Bulgaria.
