= Velislav Vasilev =

Bulgarian footballer

Personal information
- Full name: Velislav Krasimirov Vasilev
- Date of birth: 27 March 2001 (age 25)
- Place of birth: Varna, Bulgaria
- Height: 1.75 m (5 ft 9 in)
- Position: Winger

Team information
- Current team: Montana
- Number: 25

Youth career
- 2008–2019: Cherno More

Senior career*
Years	Team	Apps	(Gls)
2019–2025	Cherno More	81	(1)
2024	→ Yantra Gabrovo (loan)	12	(4)
2025–2026	Yantra Gabrovo	23	(1)
2026	Pirin Blagoevgrad	11	(2)
2026–	Montana	14	(3)

International career^{‡}
2021–	Bulgaria U21	2	(0)
- * Club domestic league appearances and goals as of 4 November 2026 ‡ National team caps and goals as of 21:34, 25 March 2022 (UTC)

Velislav Vasilev (Bulgarian: Велислав Василев; born 27 March 2001) is a Bulgarian professional footballer who plays as a winger for Bulgarian Second League club Montana.

== Career ==
Vasilev made his first team debut for Cherno More in a 2–0 home win against Vitosha Bistritsa on 13 June 2020, coming on as a substitute for Ilian Iliev Jr.

== Career statistics ==
=== Club ===
As of 28 July 2023

Club	League	Season	League		Cup		Continental		Total	
Club	League	Season	Apps	Goals	Apps	Goals	Apps	Goals	Apps	Goals
Cherno More	First League	2019–20	3	0	0	0	—		3	0
Cherno More	First League	2020–21	13	0	2	0	—		15	0
Cherno More	First League	2021–22	25	0	2	0	—		27	0
Cherno More	First League	2022–23	25	0	4	0	—		29	0
Cherno More	First League	2023–24	7	1	1	0	—		8	1
Cherno More	First League	2024–25	8	0	2	0	0	0	10	0
Cherno More	Total		81	1	11	0	0	0	92	1
Yantra Gabrovo (loan)	Second League	2023–24	12	4	0	0	—		12	4
Yantra Gabrovo	Second League	2024–25	0	0	—		—		0	0
Career total			93	5	11	0	0	0	104	5
