= Celso Sidney =

Portuguese footballer (born 2001)

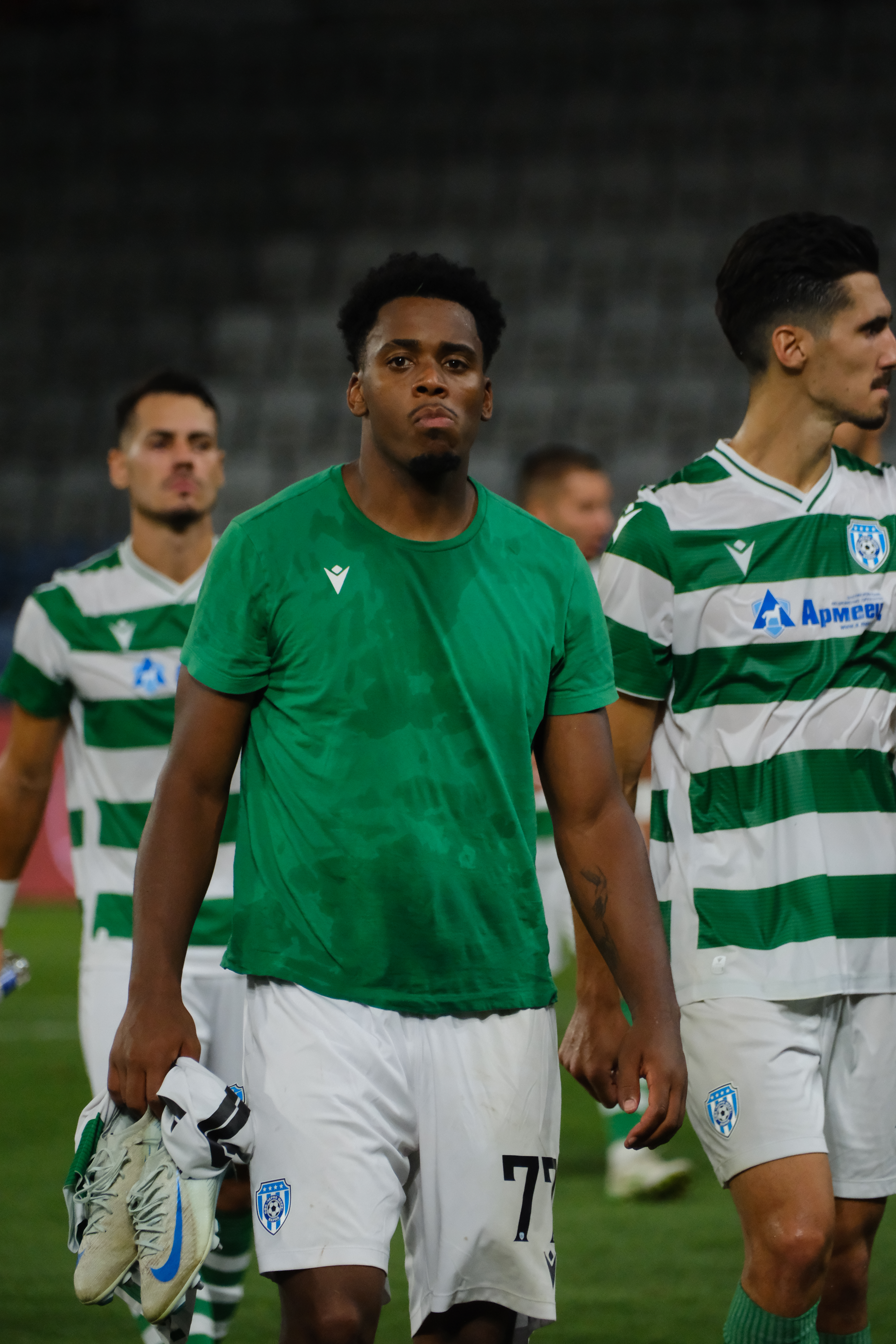

Personal information
- Full name: Celso Sidney Ribeiro Leitão
- Date of birth: 18 May 2001 (age 25)
- Place of birth: Mirandela, Portugal
- Height: 1.87 m (6 ft 2 in)
- Position: Forward

Team information
- Current team: Cherno More
- Number: 10

Youth career
- 2010–2016: GD Cachão
- 2016–2017: Chaves
- 2017–2018: Boavista
- 2018–2019: West Ham

Senior career*
Years	Team	Apps	(Gls)
2019–2020	Mirandela	10	(1)
2020	Chaves	0	(0)
2020–2021	Olhanense	1	(0)
2021–2022	Mirandela	19	(1)
2022	Leça	11	(2)
2023	Merelinense	11	(6)
2023–2024	Amora	15	(2)
2024–2025	Lusitânia	27	(6)
2025–	Cherno More	45	(7)
- * Club domestic league appearances and goals as of 8 November 2026

Celso Sidney Ribeiro Leitão (born 18 May 2001) is a Portuguese professional footballer who plays as a forward for Bulgarian First League club Cherno More Varna.

== Club career ==
Born in Mirandela, Celso Sidney played youth football for GD Cachão, Chaves, Boavista and West Ham United. On 3 September 2019, he joined Mirandela. On 15 September 2019, Sidney made his Campeonato de Portugal debut in a 1–0 away loss against União da Madeira.

On 29 June 2023, Sidney signed with Liga 3 club Amora.

On 10 June 2025, Sidney signed a contract with Bulgarian club Cherno More Varna as a free agent.
