= Georgi Varbanov =

Bulgarian footballer (born 2000)

Personal information
- Full name: Georgi Nikolov Varbanov
- Date of birth: 27 September 2000 (age 26)
- Place of birth: Byala, Ruse Province, Bulgaria
- Height: 1.80 m (5 ft 11 in)
- Position: Defender

Youth career
- Vitosha Bistritsa

Senior career*
Years	Team	Apps	(Gls)
2020	Vitosha Bistritsa	5	(0)
2020–2023	Yantra Gabrovo	68	(2)
2023–2024	Pirin Blagoevgrad	18	(0)
2024–2026	Septemvri Sofia	52	(1)
- * Club domestic league appearances and goals as of 16 October 2026 (UTC)

Georgi Varbanov (Bulgarian: Георги Върбанов; born 27 September 2000) is a Bulgarian professional footballer who plays as a defender.

== Career ==
Varbanov was part from Vitosha Bistritsa before moving to Yantra Gabrovo on 14 October 2020, along with Vitosha's manager Kostadin Angelov. On 12 July 2023, he moved from Yantra to Pirin Blagoevgrad. In June 2024, Septemvri Sofia expressed a desire to sign Varbanov, as Pirin was relegated from the First League, and completed the transfer before the start of the season.

== Career statistics ==
As of 4 May 2025

Appearances and goals by club, season and competition
Club	Season	League			Bulgarian Cup		Europe		Other		Total	
Club	Season	Division	Apps	Goals	Apps	Goals	Apps	Goals	Apps	Goals	Apps	Goals
Vitosha Bistritsa	2020–21	Second League	5	0	0	0	—		—		5	0
Yantra Gabrovo	2020–21	Second League	18	0	1	0	—		—		19	0
Yantra Gabrovo	2021–22	Second League	24	1	0	0	—		—		24	1
Yantra Gabrovo	2022–23	Second League	26	1	0	0	—		—		26	1
Yantra Gabrovo	Total		68	2	1	0	0	0	0	0	69	2
Pirin Blagoevgrad	2023–24	First League	18	0	1	0	—		—		19	0
Septemvri Sofia	2024–25	First League	30	0	1	0	—		—		31	0
Career total			121	2	3	0	0	0	0	0	124	2
