= Martin Milushev =

Bulgarian footballer

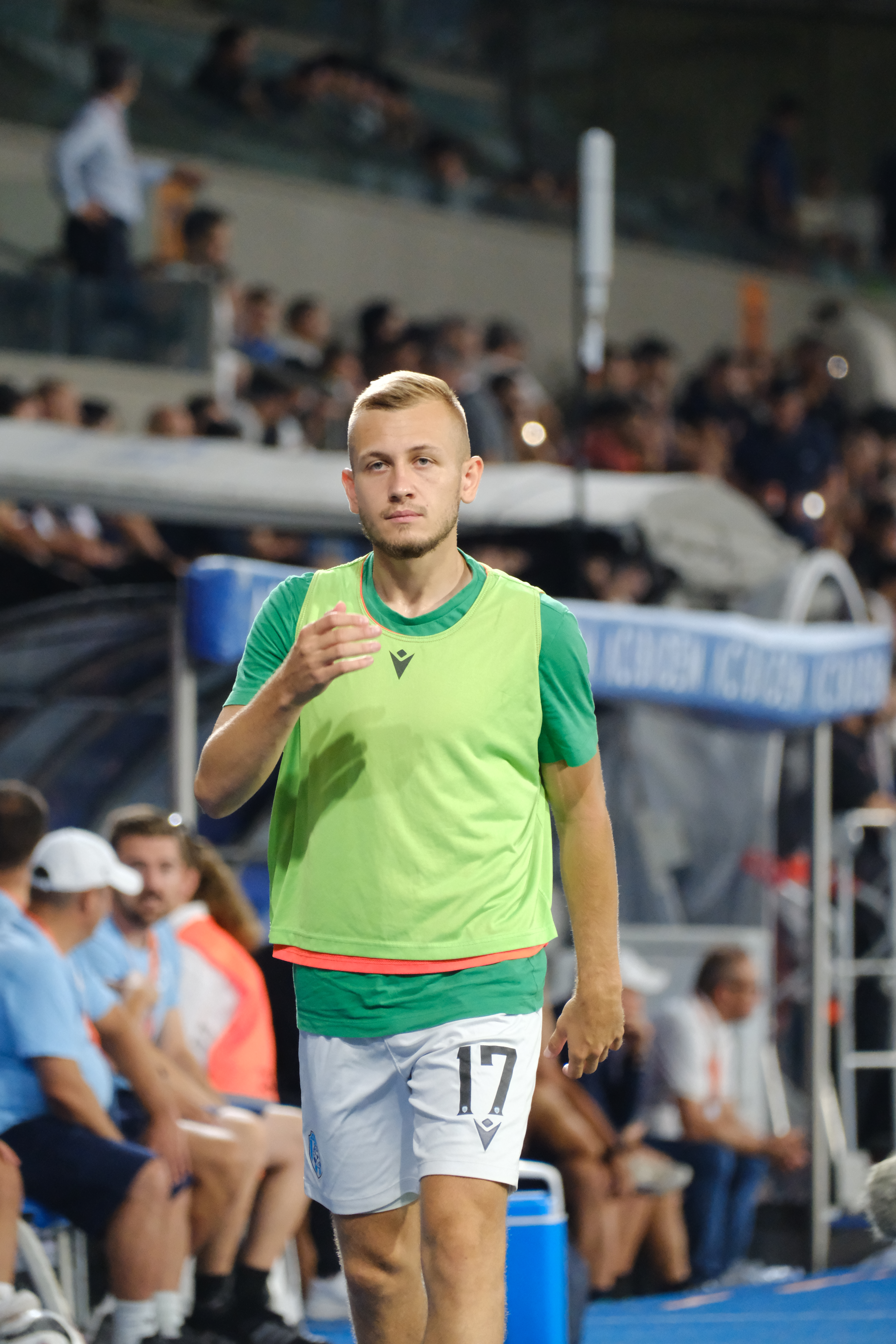

Personal information
- Full name: Martin Konstantinov Milushev
- Date of birth: 30 March 2002 (age 24)
- Place of birth: Varna, Bulgaria
- Height: 1.77 m (5 ft 9 1/2 in)
- Position: Midfielder

Team information
- Current team: Montana
- Number: 7

Youth career
- 2010–2021: Cherno More

Senior career*
Years	Team	Apps	(Gls)
2020–2025	Cherno More	42	(0)
2022–2023	→ Dobrudzha (loan)	30	(3)
2023–2024	→ Cherno More II	4	(1)
2026	Pirin Blagoevgrad	14	(1)
2026–	Montana	14	(3)
- * Club domestic league appearances and goals as of 4 November 2026

Martin Milushev (Bulgarian: Мартин Милушев; born 30 March 2002) is a Bulgarian professional footballer who plays as a midfielder for Bulgarian Second League club Montana.

== Career ==
Having come up through Cherno More's academy, Milushev made his first team debut on 11 July 2020 at the age of 18 against Botev Plovdiv. On 21 July 2021 he signed his first professional contract with the club.

In June 2022, Milushev joined Second League club Dobrudzha Dobrich on loan for the duration of the 2022–23 season. He returned to Cherno More at the end of the season having made 31 appearances for Dobrudzha.

On 4 January 2026 Milushev left because he wanted to play somewhere he wolud get more playing time.
