= Nacho Pais =

Argentine footballer (born 2000)

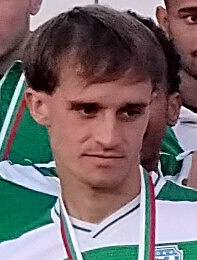

Personal information
- Full name: Ignacio Pais Mayán
- Date of birth: 30 May 2000 (age 26)
- Place of birth: Quilmes, Argentina
- Height: 1.75 m (5 ft 9 in)
- Position: Midfielder

Team information
- Current team: Banfield
- Number: 35

Youth career
- Racing Club
- 2018–2019: Diocesano

Senior career*
Years	Team	Apps	(Gls)
2019	La Solana	15	(0)
2020–2021	Cartagena B	29	(0)
2021–2022	Antequera	31	(1)
2022–2023	Cartagena B	31	(2)
2022–2023	Cartagena	1	(0)
2023–2024	Antequera	24	(0)
2024–2025	Cherno More	14	(0)
2025–2026	Danubio	14	(0)
2026–	Banfield	21	(0)

International career
2017	Argentina U17	2	(0)
- * Club domestic league appearances and goals as of 17:57, 8 November 2026 (UTC)

Ignacio "Nacho" Pais Mayán (born 30 May 2000) is an Argentine professional footballer who plays as a midfielder for Banfield.

== Club career ==
Born in Quilmes, Pais represented Racing Club as a youth before moving to Spain in 2018. After finishing his formation with CD Diocesano, he signed for Tercera División side CF La Solana on 7 August 2019.

On 23 December 2019, after becoming a regular starter, Pais moved to FC Cartagena and was assigned to the reserves also in the fourth tier. On 20 July 2021, he signed for Segunda División RFEF side Antequera CF.

On 10 August 2022, Pais returned to Cartagena and its B-team. He made his debut with the main squad on 10 September, coming on as a late substitute for Pablo de Blasis in a 2–1 Segunda División home win over Albacete Balompié.
