= Nikolay Zlatev =

Bulgarian footballer

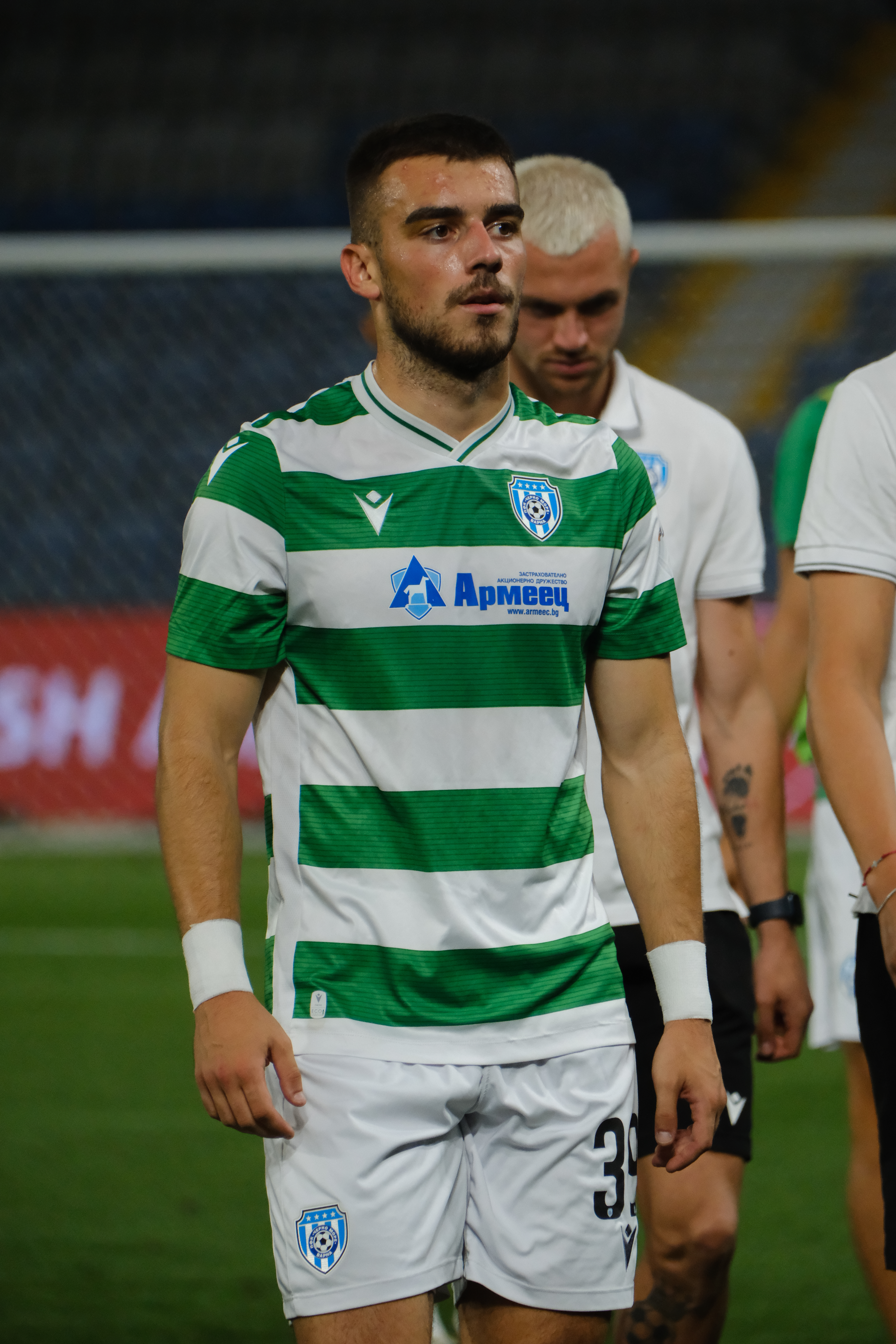

Personal information
- Full name: Nikolay Svetoslavov Zlatev
- Date of birth: 12 December 2004 (age 21)
- Place of birth: Varna, Bulgaria
- Height: 1.80 m (5 ft 11 in)
- Position: Winger

Team information
- Current team: Al Kharaitiyat (on loan from Cherno More)
- Number: 7

Youth career
- 2008–2022: Cherno More

Senior career*
Years	Team	Apps	(Gls)
2020–	Cherno More	103	(11)
2022–2024	→ Cherno More II	10	(2)
2024	→ Tabor Sežana (loan)	10	(3)
2026–	→ Al Kharaitiyat (loan)	0	(0)

International career^{‡}
2020	Bulgaria U17	2	(0)
2022	Bulgaria U19	5	(0)
2022–	Bulgaria U21	21	(0)
- * Club domestic league appearances and goals as of 17:22, 30 August 2026 (UTC) ‡ National team caps and goals as of 22:56, 10 August 2026 (UTC)

Nikolay Svetoslavov Zlatev (Bulgarian: Николай Светославов Златев; born 12 December 2004) is a Bulgarian professional footballer who plays as a winger for Qatari Second Division club Al Kharaitiyat on loan from Bulgarian First League club Cherno More Varna.

== Career ==
Zlatev made his senior debut for Cherno More on 11 July 2020, when he played in a league game against Botev Plovdiv at the age of 15 years and 7 months, making him the youngest player ever to have played for the club. On 9 June 2022, Zlatev signed his first professional contract with the club.

On 4 August 2025, Zlatev scored his first hattrick. He came off the bench in a league match against Beroe Stara Zagora, before scoring three goals in the space of 18 minutes of an eventual 4–0 win.

== Career statistics ==
=== Club ===
As of 30 August 2026

Club	League	Season	League		Cup		Continental		Other		Total	
Club	League	Season	Apps	Goals	Apps	Goals	Apps	Goals	Apps	Goals	Apps	Goals
Cherno More II	Third League	2022–23	2	0	—		—		—		2	0
Cherno More II	Third League	2023–24	7	2	—		—		—		7	2
Cherno More II	Third League	2025–26	1	0	—		—		—		1	0
Cherno More II	Total		10	2	0	0	0	0	0	0	10	2
Cherno More	First League	2019–20	1	0	0	0	—		—		1	0
Cherno More	First League	2020–21	0	0	0	0	—		—		0	0
Cherno More	First League	2021–22	7	0	0	0	—		—		7	0
Cherno More	First League	2022–23	23	2	3	0	—		—		26	2
Cherno More	First League	2023–24	14	1	1	0	—		—		15	1
Cherno More	First League	2024–25	19	2	3	0	2	0	—		24	2
Cherno More	First League	2025–26	35	5	2	0	2	0	—		39	5
Cherno More	First League	2026–27	4	1	0	0	—		—		4	1
Cherno More	Total		103	11	9	0	4	0	0	0	116	11
Tabor Sežana (loan)	2. SNL	2024–25	10	3	1	0	—		—		11	3
Career statistics			123	16	10	0	4	0	0	0	137	16

=== National team ===
Appearances and goals by national team and year
National team	Year	Apps	Goals
Bulgaria U17	2020	2	0
Bulgaria U19	2022	5	0
Bulgaria U21	2022	2	0
Bulgaria U21	2023	5	0
Bulgaria U21	2024	2	0
Bulgaria U21	2025	6	0
Total		22	0
