= Ventsislav Ivanov (footballer, born 1995) =

Bulgarian footballer

Personal information
- Date of birth: 7 September 1995 (age 31)
- Place of birth: Stara Zagora, Bulgaria
- Height: 1.70 m (5 ft 7 in)
- Position: Midfielder

Team information
- Current team: Rozova Dolina
- Number: 15

Youth career
- Beroe Stara Zagora

Senior career*
Years	Team	Apps	(Gls)
2013–2015	Beroe Stara Zagora	2	(0)
2015–2016	Vereya	26	(2)
2016–2017	Vereya II	?	(?)
2017–2021	Rozova Dolina	?	(?)
2021–2022	CSKA 1948 II	14	(1)
2022–	Rozova Dolina	?	(?)
- * Club domestic league appearances and goals as of 13:13, 2 December 2021 (UTC)

Ventsislav Ivanov (Bulgarian: Венцислав Иванов; born 7 September 1995) is a Bulgarian footballer who plays as a midfielder for Rozova Dolina.

== Career ==
=== Beroe Stara Zagora ===
Ivanov bеgan his career in Beroe Stara Zagora. On 10 October 2013 he made his debut for the team in the Cup against Vidima Rakovski. On 4 May 2015 he made his professional debut in A Group for Beroe in a match against Chernomorets Burgas.

=== Vereya Stara Zagora ===
For season 2015–16 he moved to B PFG sided FC Vereya and was released in June 2016.

== Career statistics ==
=== Club ===
As of 10 August 2015

Club performance			League		Cup		Continental		Other		Total	
Club	League	Season	Apps	Goals	Apps	Goals	Apps	Goals	Apps	Goals	Apps	Goals
Bulgaria			League		Bulgarian Cup		Europe		Other (Note: Includes Bulgarian Supercup matches.)		Total	
Beroe Stara Zagora	A Group	2013–14	2	0	1	0	0	0	–		3	0
Beroe Stara Zagora	A Group	2014–15	0	0	0	0	–		–		0	0
Beroe Stara Zagora	Total		2	0	1	0	0	0	0	0	3	0
Vereya Stara Zagora	B Group	2015–16	12	1	1	0	–		–		13	1
Vereya Stara Zagora	Total		12	1	1	0	0	0	0	0	13	1
Career statistics			14	1	2	0	0	0	0	0	16	1
