= João Pedro (footballer, born April 2000) =

Brazilian footballer

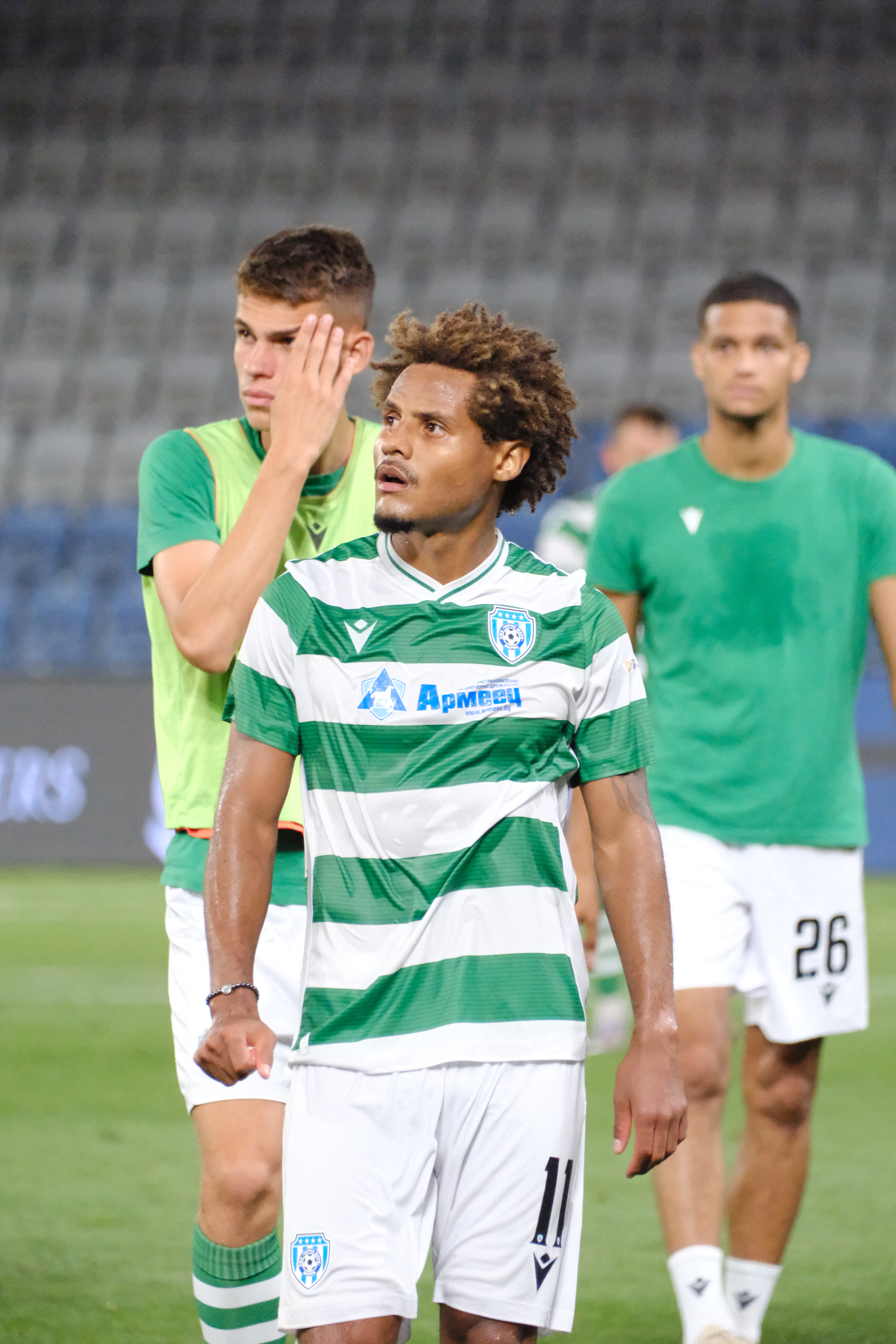

Personal information
- Full name: João Pedro Costa Contreiras Martins
- Date of birth: 20 April 2000 (age 26)
- Place of birth: Rio de Janeiro, Brazil
- Height: 1.70 m (5 ft 7 in)
- Position: Winger

Team information
- Current team: Brusque
- Number: 18

Youth career
- –2021: Vasco da Gama

Senior career*
Years	Team	Apps	(Gls)
2020–2021	Vasco da Gama	14	(0)
2022–2025	Linense	98	(8)
2025	Cherno More	16	(1)
2026–	Brusque	27	(7)
- * Club domestic league appearances and goals as of 8 November 2026

João Pedro Costa Contreiras Martins (born 20 April 2000), commonly known as João Pedro, is a Brazilian professional footballer who plays as a winger for Brusque.

== Career ==
Born in Rio de Janeiro, João Pedro is a youth product of Vasco da Gama. On 23 January 2020, he made his professional debut with the first team, coming on as a second-half substitute in a 0–1 home loss against Flamengo in the Campeonato Carioca.

On 29 May 2022, João Pedro joined Primera Federación club Linense in Spain on a three-year contract.

== Career statistics ==
As of 15 December 2025

Appearances and goals by club, season and competition
Club	Season	League			State league		Cup		Continental		Total	
Club	Season	Division	Apps	Goals	Apps	Goals	Apps	Goals	Apps	Goals	Apps	Goals
Vasco da Gama	2020	Série A	0	0	1 (Note: Appearances in the Campeonato Carioca)	0	0	0	0	0	1	0
Vasco da Gama	2021	Série B	8	0	5	0	0	0	0	0	13	0
Vasco da Gama	Total		8	0	6	0	0	0	0	0	14	0
Linense	2022–23	Primera Federación	35	2	—		0	0	—		35	2
Linense	2023–24	Segunda Federación	31	3	—		0	0	—		31	3
Linense	2024–25	Segunda Federación	32	3	—		0	0	—		32	3
Linense	Total		98	8	0	0	0	0	0	0	98	8
Cherno More	2025–26	First League	16	1	—		2	0	2	0	20	1
Career total			122	9	6	0	2	0	2	0	132	9
