= Breno Teixeira (footballer, born 2002) =

Brazilian footballer

Personal information
- Full name: Breno Henrique Neres Teixeira
- Date of birth: 7 May 2002 (age 24)
- Place of birth: Águas de Lindoia, Brazil
- Height: 1.88 m (6 ft 2 in)
- Position: Forward

Team information
- Current team: América Mineiro

Youth career
- 2014–2020: Brasilis
- 2020–2022: Cruzeiro

Senior career*
Years	Team	Apps	(Gls)
2022–2023	Cruzeiro	6	(0)
2023	→ Valladolid B (loan)	6	(0)
2023–2025	Cherno More	23	(1)
2025–	América Mineiro	0	(0)
- * Club domestic league appearances and goals as of 18:27, 19 May 2025 (UTC)

Breno Henrique Neres Teixeira (born 7 May 2002), simply known as Breno or Breno Teixeira, is a Brazilian professional footballer who plays as a forward for América Mineiro.

== Career ==
Breno began playing football at a young age for Brasilis. In 2020, he moved to Cruzeiro at the age of 18. In 2022 season Breno made 32 appearances and scored 15 goals for Cruzeiro's U20 team. On 16 June 2022, he made his first-team debut in a 2–0 Campeonato Brasileiro Série B win over Ponte Preta.
