= PFC Cherno More Varna II =

Cherno More II
- Full name: Professional Football Club Cherno More Varna II
- Nickname: Моряците (The Sailors)
- Short name: Cherno More II
- Founded: 1 August 2022; 4 years ago
- Ground: Cherno More Sports Complex
- Capacity: 1,500
- Owner: Chimimport
- Chairman: Plamen Andreev
- Head coach: Martin Hristov
- League: North-East Third League
- 2024–25: 6th of 15
- Website: chernomorepfc.bg
Home colours	Away colours	Third colours

Cherno More II (Bulgarian: Черно Море II) or Cherno More 2 is a Bulgarian professional football team based in Varna. Founded in 2022, it is the reserve team of Cherno More Varna, and currently plays in Third League, the third level of Bulgarian football.

Obliged to play one level below their main side, Cherno More II is ineligible for promotion to First League and also can not compete in the Bulgarian Cup.

== History ==
=== 2022–present:Foundation ===
Since 2015, the Bulgarian Football Union allowed Bulgarian teams to have reserve sides in the lower regional divisions. Cherno More had the right to start their reserve team in Second League, but instead in 2022 they announced they will start their reserve team in Third League. The team won their first ever match in Third League, played on 14 August 2022. In 2023, team expressed desire to win the league and promote to Second League. On 8 November 2023, they beat their main opponent for the promote Fratria with 5:0 result.

== Players ==
=== Current squad ===
As of 1 December 2025

Note: Flags indicate national team as defined under FIFA eligibility rules; some limited exceptions apply. Players may hold more than one non-FIFA nationality.

No.	Pos.	Nation	Player
2	DF	BUL	Emanuil Nyagolov
3	DF	BUL	Petar Nikolov
4	DF	BUL	Presiyan Tsarev
6	MF	BUL	Dimitar Zaimov
7	MF	BUL	Georgi Paskov
8	MF	BUL	Dimitar Kichukov
10	FW	BUL	Kristian Mihaylov
11	MF	BUL	Aleksandar Kirov
14	MF	BUL	Yordan Todorov

No.	Pos.	Nation	Player
15	DF	BUL	Nikolay Milenkov
17	FW	BUL	Nikola Nedkov
20	FW	BUL	Vasil Kasabov
21	FW	BUL	Teodor Kostadinov
24	DF	BUL	Andrey Hristov
27	MF	BUL	Petar Marinov
28	MF	BUL	Denislav Mladenov
30	GK	BUL	Georgi Monev
31	MF	BUL	Stefan Dyulgerov

== Past seasons ==
Results of league and cup competitions by season
Season	League											Top goalscorer	
Season	Division	Level	P	W	D	L	F	A	GD	Pts	Pos	Top goalscorer	
2022–23	Third League	3	28	15	2	11	63	33	+30	47	6th	(Bulgaria) Marin Petkov	13
2023–24	Third League	3	26	16	8	2	52	19	+33	56	4th	(Bulgaria) Hristo Yanachkov	7
2024–25	Third League	3	30	14	7	9	42	31	+11	49	6th		

=== Key ===
- GS = Group stage
- QF = Quarter-finals
- SF = Semi-finals

Promoted	Relegated
