= 2026 Bulgarian Cup final =

Финал на Sesame Купа на България 2026
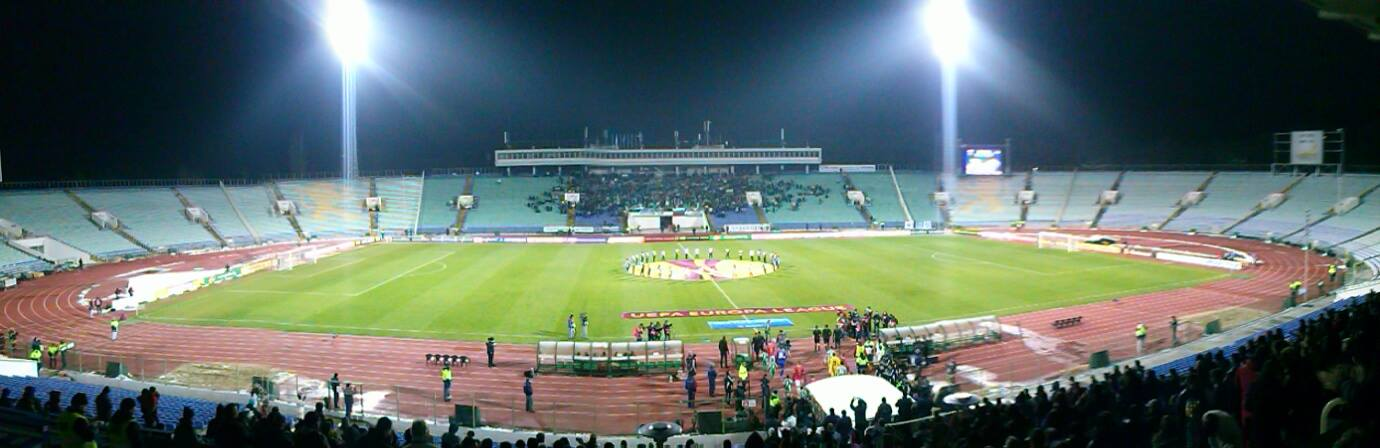
- Event: 2025–26 Bulgarian Cup
Lokomotiv Plovdiv	CSKA Sofia
1	1
- CSKA Sofia won 4–3 on penalties
- Date: 20 May 2026
- Venue: Vasil Levski, Sofia
- Referee: Mariyan Grebencharski (Samokov)
- Attendance: 32,000
- Weather: Thunder; 18 °C (64 °F)

The 2026 Bulgarian Cup final was the final match of the 2025–26 Bulgarian Cup and the 86th final of the Bulgarian Cup. The final took place on 20 May 2026 at the Vasil Levski National Stadium in Sofia. On 3 April 2026, the date and venue have been confirmed.

The clubs contesting the final were Lokomotiv Plovdiv and CSKA Sofia. This was the second time two teams met in the final after 2020. For Lokomotiv, this was their 7th final overall, whereas CSKA reached this stage for a 2nd consecutive and 37th time overall.

CSKA won the game after penalties for their 22nd cup victory in their history. It ensured their spot in the first qualifying round of 2026–27 UEFA Europa League.

== Route to the final ==
Lokomotiv Plovdiv			Round	CSKA
Opponent	Result	Legs		Opponent	Result	Legs
Dunav Ruse	2–1 (a.e.t.)	away	First round	Sevlievo	2–1	away
Montana	4–0	home	Second round	Lokomotiv Sofia	2–1	home
Botev Plovdiv	1–0	home	Quarter-finals	CSKA 1948	2–0	home
Arda	5–1	4–0 away; 1–1 home	Semi-finals	Ludogorets Razgrad	2–1	2–1 away; 0–0 home

== Match ==
=== Details ===
20 May 2026
19:00 UTC+3

Lokomotiv Plovdiv	1–1 (a.e.t.)	CSKA Sofia
Lucas Ryan 47'	Report	Godoy 11'
Penalties
Iliev (penalty missed); Lucas Ryan (penalty scored); Chindriș (penalty scored); Zwarts (penalty scored); Dinev (penalty missed)	3−4	(penalty missed) Jordão; (penalty scored) Ebong; (penalty scored) Ivanov; (penalty scored) Godoy; (penalty scored) Eto'o

Natsionalen stadion Vasil Levski, Sofia
Attendance: 32,000
Referee: Mariyan Grebencharski (Samokov)

Lokomotiv	CSKA

GK	1	(Switzerland) Bojan Milosavljević
RB	2	(Venezuela) Adrián Cova	(yellow card) 78'
CB	4	(Romania) Andrei Chindriș	(yellow card) 70'
CB	13	(Brazil) Lucas Ryan	(yellow card) 94'
LB	5	(Bulgaria) Todor Pavlov	(substituted off) 108'
CM	22	(Bulgaria) Ivaylo Ivanov	(substituted off) 25'
CM	12	(Bulgaria) Efe Ali	(yellow card) 48'	(substituted off) 98'
RW	7	(Bulgaria) Sevi Idriz	(substituted off) 98'
AM	39	(Tajikistan) Parvizdzhon Umarbayev (c)	(substituted off) 82'
LW	94	(Romania) Cătălin Itu	(yellow card) 64'	(substituted off) 98'
CF	77	(Netherlands) Joël Zwarts
Substitutes:
GK	40	(Bosnia and Herzegovina) Petar Zovko
DF	33	(Bulgaria) Martin Atanasov	(substituted on) 98'	(yellow card) 118'
DF	44	(Bulgaria) Kaloyan Kostov	(substituted on) 108'
MF	3	(Slovenia) Miha Trdan	(substituted on) 82'
MF	10	(Palestine) Francisco Politino
FW	9	(Bulgaria) Axel Velev
FW	11	(Bulgaria) Zapro Dinev	(substituted on) 98'
FW	14	(Bulgaria) Dimitar Iliev	(substituted on) 98'
FW	99	(France) Julien Lamy	(substituted on) 25'
Manager:
(Slovenia) Dušan Kosič

GK	21	(Belarus) Fyodor Lapoukhov
RB	2	(Brazil) Pastor
CB	14	(Bulgaria) Teodor Ivanov	(yellow card) 97'
CB	32	(Argentina) Facundo Rodríguez
LB	17	(Argentina) Ángelo Martino
DM	6	(Portugal) Bruno Jordão (c)
LM	11	(France) Mohamed Brahimi	(yellow card) 63'	(substituted off) 90+1'
CM	99	(Cameroon) James Eto'o
CM	10	(Belarus) Max Ebong
RM	28	(Cyprus) Ioannis Pittas	(substituted off) 103'
CF	9	(Argentina) Santiago Godoy
Substitutes:
GK	25	(Bulgaria) Dimitar Evtimov
DF	3	(Bulgaria) Andrey Yordanov
DF	4	(Spain) Adrián Lapeña
DF	5	(Kosovo) Lumbardh Dellova
DF	19	(Bulgaria) Ivan Turitsov
MF	30	(Bulgaria) Petko Panayotov
MF	38	(Brazil) Léo Pereira	(substituted on) 90+1'
MF	73	(Bulgaria) Ilian Iliev
MF	77	(Colombia) Alejandro Piedrahita	(substituted on) 103'
Manager:
(Bulgaria) Hristo Yanev

Man of the Match:

Assistant referees:
Martin Venev (Sofia)
Ivo Kolev (Sofia)
Fourth official:
Vasil Minev (Sofia)
Video assistant referee:
Dimitar Dimitrov (Sofia)
Assistant video assistant referee:
Lyuboslav Lyubomirov (Pernik)

Match rules

- 90 minutes.
- 30 minutes of extra time if necessary.
- Penalty shoot-out if scores still level.
- Seven named substitutes.
- Maximum of five substitutions, with a sixth allowed in extra time. (Note: Each team will be given only three opportunities to make substitutions, with a fourth opportunity in extra time, excluding substitutions made at half-time, before the start of extra time and at half-time in extra time.)
