= 2025–26 PFC CSKA Sofia season =

CSKA Sofia
2025–26 season
- Controlling owner: National Fund for Sport, Culture, Art, and Science (71.29%); ID1 Invest (28.71%) (until 18 December 2025) CSKA Red Hearts Foundation (since 18 December 2025)
- Manager: Dušan Kerkez (until 19 September 2025); Valentin Iliev (interim) (until 24 September 2025); Hristo Yanev (since 24 September 2025)
- Parva Liga: 4th
- Bulgarian Cup: Winners
- Top goalscorer: League: Santiago Godoy (13); All: Santiago Godoy (15)
- All statistics correct as of 25 May 2026.

The 2025–26 season was CSKA Sofia's 77th season in the Parva Liga (the top flight of Bulgarian football) and their tenth consecutive participation after their administrative relegation in the third division due to mounting financial troubles. In addition to the domestic league, CSKA Sofia participated in this season's edition of the Bulgarian Cup. For a second consecutive year the club did not play in the UEFA club tournaments. The last time this occurred for sporting reasons was in the 1967–69 period. This article showed player statistics and all matches (official and friendly) that the club will play during the 2025–26 season.

== Players ==
=== Squad information ===
N	Pos.	Nat.	Name	Age	Since	App	Goals	Ends	Transfer fee	Notes
2	DF	(Brazil)	Pastor	25	2025	37	0	2028	€800,000	
3	DF	(Bulgaria)	Andrey Yordanov	23	2025 (Winter)	11	0	2028	€150,000	
4	DF	(Spain)	Adrián Lapeña	29	2024 (Winter)	49	1	2028	€700,000	
5	DF	(Kosovo)	Lumbardh Dellova	26	2024	69	4	2027	€350,000	
6	MF	(Portugal)	Bruno Jordão	26	2025	30	3	2028	€500,000	
7	MF	(Norway)	Olaus Skarsem	26	2023 (Winter)	62	5	2027	€500,000	
9	FW	(Argentina)	Santiago Godoy	24	2025	34	15	2028	€1,800,000	
10	MF	(Belarus)	Max Ebong	25	2025 (Winter)	21	4	2028	€425,000	
11	MF	(France)	Mohamed Brahimi	26	2025	30	5	2028	Free	
14	DF	(Bulgaria)	Teodor Ivanov	21	2025	32	0	2028	€500,000	
17	DF	(Argentina)	Ángelo Martino	27	2025	31	0	2028	€345,000	
19	DF	(Bulgaria)	Ivan Turitsov	25	2018	222	7	2026	Youth system	
21	GK	(Belarus)	Fyodor Lapoukhov	22	2024 (Winter)	48	0	2028	€650,000	
23	MF	(Bulgaria)	Ilian Antonov	20	2022	12	0	2026	Youth system	
24	DF	(Bulgaria)	Yulian Iliev	20	2024	3	0	2028	Youth system	
25	GK	(Bulgaria)	Dimitar Evtimov	31	2025 (Winter)	32	0	2025	Free	
28	FW	(Cyprus)	Ioannis Pittas	28	2024 (Winter)	64	20	2028	€1,200,000	
29	FW	(Bulgaria)	Ivan Tasev	22	2024	19	2	2026	Free	
30	MF	(Bulgaria)	Petko Panayotov	19	2024	59	4	2027	Youth system	
32	DF	(Argentina)	Facundo Rodríguez	25	2025 (Winter)	14	0	2027	Loan	
34	MF	(Bulgaria)	Vasil Kaymakanov	18	2020	1	0	2029	Youth system	
38	FW	(Brazil)	Léo Pereira	25	2025 (Winter)	19	2	2028	€800,000	
73	MF	(Bulgaria)	Ilian Iliev	25	2024	60	5	2026	Free	
77	FW	(Colombia)	Alejandro Piedrahita	22	2025 (Winter)	18	2	2028	Free	
91	DF	(Bulgaria)	Aleks Tunchev	16	2025	1	0	2029	Youth system	
94	MF	(Central African Republic)	Isaac Solet	24	2025 (Winter)	15	0	2028	€500,000	
99	MF	(Cameroon)	James Eto'o	24	2024	68	5	2027	€1,000,000	

- Last updated: 20 May 2026
- Source: Players transfer and Wikipedia players' articles
- Ordered by squad number.

== Transfers ==
=== In ===
No.	Pos.	Nat.	Name	Age	EU	Moving from	Type	Transfer window	Ends	Transfer fee	Source
25	FW	(Bulgaria)	Mark-Emilio Papazov	21	EU	(Bulgaria) Botev Vratsa	Loan return	Summer	2026	Free	
34	MF	(Bulgaria)	Vasil Kaymakanov	17	EU	Youth team	Promoted	Summer	2029	Free	cska.bg
31	GK	(Bulgaria)	Georgi Gerginov	19	EU	Youth team	Promoted	Summer	2029	Free	cska.bg
14	DF	(Bulgaria)	Teodor Ivanov	21	EU	(Bulgaria) CSKA 1948	Transfer	Summer	2028	€500,000	cska.bg
8	MF	(Sweden)	David Seger	25	EU	(Sweden) Östers IF	Transfer	Summer	2028	€400,000	cska.bg
22	FW	(Albania)	Kevin Dodaj	19	Non-EU	(Albania) KF Vllaznia Shkodër	Transfer	Summer	2028	€450,000	cska.bg
2	DF	(Brazil)	Pastor	25	Non-EU	(Portugal) Farense	Transfer	Summer	2028	€800,000	cska.bg
9	FW	(Argentina)	Santiago Godoy	24	Non-EU	(Bulgaria) Beroe	Transfer	Summer	2028	€1,800,000	cska.bg
6	MF	(Portugal)	Bruno Jordão	26	EU	(Poland) Radomiak Radom	Transfer	Summer	2028	€500,000	cska.bg
11	MF	(France)	Mohamed Brahimi	26	EU	(Russia) Fakel Voronezh	Transfer	Summer	2028	Free	cska.bg
17	DF	(Argentina)	Ángelo Martino	27	EU	(Argentina) Newell's Old Boys	Transfer	Summer	2028	€345,000	cska.bg
77	FW	(Colombia)	Alejandro Piedrahita	23	Non-EU	(Argentina) Gimnasia	Transfer	Winter	2028	Free	cska.bg
10	MF	(Belarus)	Max Ebong	26	Non-EU	(Kazakhstan) Astana	Transfer	Winter	2028	€425,000	cska.bg
38	FW	(Brazil)	Léo Pereira	25	Non-EU	(Brazil) CRB	Transfer	Winter	2028	€800,000	cska.bg
3	DF	(Bulgaria)	Andrey Yordanov	24	EU	(Bulgaria) Botev Plovdiv	Transfer	Winter	2028	€150,000	cska.bg
94	MF	(Central African Republic)	Isaac Solet	24	EU	(Bulgaria) Slavia Sofia	Transfer	Winter	2028	€500,000	cska.bg
25	GK	(Bulgaria)	Dimitar Evtimov	32	EU	(Bulgaria) Botev Vratsa	Transfer	Winter	2028	Free	dsport.bg
32	DF	(Argentina)	Facundo Rodríguez	25	EU	(Argentina) Estudiantes de La Plata	Loan	Winter	2027	Free	cska.bg

=== Out ===
No.	Pos.	Nat.	Name	Age	EU	Moving to	Type	Transfer window	Transfer fee	Source
8	MF	(Bulgaria)	Stanislav Shopov	23	EU	(Croatia) Osijek	End of contract	Summer	Free	dsport.bg
10	MF	(Norway)	Jonathan Lindseth	29	EU	(Turkey) Manisa	End of contract	Summer	Free	dsport.bg
26	MF	(Colombia)	Marcelino Carreazo	25	Non-EU	(Cyprus) Apollon Limassol	End of contract	Summer	Free	dsport.bg
—	GK	(Bulgaria)	Dimitar Evtimov	31	EU	(Bulgaria) Botev Vratsa	End of contract	Summer	Free	dsport.bg
25	GK	(Bulgaria)	Ivan Dyulgerov	25	EU	(Moldova) Sheriff Tiraspol	Released	Summer	Free	cska.bg
31	DF	(Bulgaria)	Rosen Marinov	20	EU	(Bulgaria) Botev Vratsa	Transfer	Summer	Free	dsport.bg
11	FW	(Guadeloupe)	Matthias Phaëton	25	EU	(Switzerland) FC Zürich	Loan	Summer	Free	cska.bg
6	DF	(Scotland)	Liam Cooper	33	Non-EU	(England) Sheffield Wednesday	Released	Summer	Free	cska.bg
11	FW	(Kosovo)	Zymer Bytyqi	28	EU	(Norway) Kristiansund	Released	Summer	Free	cska.bg
15	DF	(France)	Thibaut Vion	31	EU	(Luxembourg) Progrès Niederkorn	Released	Summer	Free	cska.bg
17	MF	(Democratic Republic of the Congo)	Jason Lokilo	26	EU	(Poland) Piast Gliwice	Released	Summer	Free	cska.bg
45	FW	(Belgium)	Aaron Leya Iseka	28	EU	(Greece) OFI Crete	Released	Summer	Free	cska.bg
18	DF	(Luxembourg)	Mica Pinto	32	EU	(Netherlands) FC Dordrecht	Released	Summer	Free	cska.bg
31	GK	(Bulgaria)	Georgi Gerginov	19	EU	(Bulgaria) Botev Vratsa	Loan	Summer	Free	avtogol.net
3	DF	(The Gambia)	Sainey Sanyang	22	Non-EU	(Bulgaria) Botev Vratsa	Loan	Winter	Free	cska.bg
20	DF	(Bulgaria)	Martin Stoychev	22	EU	(Bulgaria) Botev Vratsa	Loan	Winter	Free	cska.bg
13	DF	(Colombia)	Brayan Córdoba	26	Non-EU	(Colombia) Cúcuta Deportivo	Released	Winter	Free	cska.bg
1	GK	(Brazil)	Gustavo Busatto	35	Non-EU	(Brazil) Caxias	Released	Winter	Free	cska.bg
12	GK	(Bulgaria)	Marin Orlinov	31	EU	(Bulgaria) Botev Vratsa	Transfer	Winter	Free	dsport.bg
91	FW	(Bulgaria)	Yoan Bornosuzov	22	EU	(Bulgaria) Botev Vratsa	Loan	Winter	Free	dsport.bg
22	FW	(Albania)	Kevin Dodaj	20	Non-EU	(Albania) KF Vllaznia Shkodër	Loan	Winter	Free	cska.bg
8	MF	(Sweden)	David Seger	26	EU	(Sweden) BK Häcken	Released	Winter	Free	cska.bg
16	MF	(Bulgaria)	Georgi Chorbadzhiyski	21	EU	(Bulgaria) Lokomotiv Plovdiv	Loan	Winter	Free	cska.bg

== Pre-season and friendlies ==
Win Draw Loss Fixtures

=== Pre-season ===
25 June 2025 Friendly	CSKA	1–1	(North Macedonia) Shkëndija	Čatež ob Savi, Slovenia
18:30 UTC+3	Ivanov 60'	Report	Krasniqi 85'	Stadium: Sportski Centar Terme Čatež

28 June 2025 Friendly	CSKA	0–0	(Ukraine) Kryvbas	Čatež ob Savi, Slovenia
18:00 UTC+3	Pittas (penalty missed) 38'; Bornosuzov (penalty missed) 58'	Report	Romanchuk (penalty missed) 66'	Stadium: Sportski Centar Terme Čatež

30 June 2025 Friendly	CSKA	0–1	(Croatia) Hajduk Split	Radomlje, Slovenia
18:30 UTC+3		Report	Livaja 5'	Stadium: Športni park Radomlje

2 July 2025 Friendly	CSKA	0–3	(Slovenia) Olimpija Ljubljana	Ljubljana, Slovenia
20:00 UTC+3		Report	Aćimović 16'; Doffo 66'; Tamm 81'	Stadium: Športni park ŽAK

12 July 2025 Friendly	CSKA	3–1	(Serbia) Radnički Niš	Sofia, Bulgaria
19:00 UTC+3	Sanyang 3'; Pittas 12', 58'	Report	Izderić 88'	Stadium: Natsionalen stadion Vasil Levski; Referee: Volen Chinkov (Sofia)

=== On-season (autumn) ===
5 September 2025 Friendly	CSKA	2–0	(Serbia) Radnik Surdulica	Pancharevo, Bulgaria
17:00 UTC+2	Pastor 26'; Godoy 38'	Report		Stadium: Sporten kompleks Pancharevo; Attendance: behind closed doors Referee: Petar Nikolov (Sofia)

11 October 2025 Friendly	CSKA	4−0	Septemvri	Pancharevo, Bulgaria
11:00 UTC+2	Godoy 14'; Schouten 24' (o.g.); Chorbadzhiyski 27'; Brahimi 45'	Report		Stadium: Sporten kompleks Pancharevo; Attendance: behind closed doors Referee: Dimitar Dimitrov (Sofia)

=== Mid-season ===
14 January 2026 Friendly	CSKA	0−2	(Poland) Korona Kielce	Muratpaşa, Turkey
16:30 UTC+2	Godoy (yellow card) 67'; Ebong (yellow card) 68'; Lapeña (red card) 81'; Panayotov (yellow card) 88'	Report	Nikolov (yellow card) 13'; Stępiński 61', 80'; Svetlin (yellow card) 68'	Stadium: Titanic Lara 1

17 January 2026 Friendly	CSKA	1−2	(Czech Republic) Mladá Boleslav	Serik, Turkey
15:30 UTC+2	Jordão (yellow card) 29'; Martino (yellow card) 53'; Brahimi 79' (pen.); I. Iliev (yellow card) 86'	Report	Buryán 26'; Ševčík 29' (pen.); Hora (yellow card) 56'	Stadium: Cornelia Diamond Stadium

21 January 2026 Friendly	CSKA	0−0	(Ukraine) LNZ Cherkasy	Aksu, Turkey
15:00 UTC+2	Dellova (yellow card) 43'	Report	Putrya (yellow card) 51'; Ryabov (yellow card) 65'	Stadium: Titanic Mardan 1

23 January 2026 Friendly	CSKA	v	(Serbia) Novi Pazar	Muratpaşa, Turkey
14:00 UTC+2		Report		Stadium: Titanic Lara 1

23 January 2026 Friendly	CSKA	5−2	(South Korea) Gangwon	Manavgat, Turkey
11:00 UTC+2	Dodaj 12'; Brahimi 55', 71'; Godoy 57'; Jordão 70'	Report	Park 37'; Ko 39'	Stadium: Side Stars Sports Complex

31 January 2026 Friendly	CSKA	3−1	Dunav	Pancharevo, Bulgaria
14:00 UTC+2	Jordão 14'; Brahimi 73'; Godoy 86'	Report	Apostolov (yellow card) 68'; Áquila 81'	Stadium: Sporten kompleks Pancharevo; Attendance: behind closed doors Referee: Dimitar Burov (Sofia)

=== On-season (spring) ===
27 March 2026 Friendly	CSKA	6−0	Oborishte	Pancharevo, Bulgaria
16:00 UTC+2	Godoy 19', 22', 51', 84'; Brahimi 25'; Rodríguez 70'	Report		Stadium: Sporten kompleks Pancharevo; Attendance: behind closed doors

== Competitions ==
=== Overview ===
Competition	First match	Last match	Starting round	Final position	Record							
Competition	First match	Last match	Starting round	Final position	Pld	W	D	L	GF	GA	GD	Win %
Parva Liga	19 July 2025	25 May 2026	Matchday 1	4th	36	18	9	9	47	30	+17	50.00
Bulgarian Cup	29 October 2025	20 May 2026	First round	Winners	6	4	2	0	9	4	+5	66.67
Total					42	22	11	9	56	34	+22	52.38

Last updated: 25 May 2026
Source: Competitions

=== Parva Liga ===
==== Regular stage ====
===== League table =====
Pos	Team	Pld	W	D	L	GF	GA	GD	Pts	Qualification
2	Ludogorets	30	17	9	4	57	20	+37	60	Qualification for the Championship group
3	CSKA 1948	30	18	5	7	50	31	+19	59	Qualification for the Championship group
4	CSKA Sofia	30	16	8	6	43	23	+20	56	Qualification for the Championship group
5	Lokomotiv Plovdiv	30	11	13	6	30	33	−3	46	Qualification for the Conference League group
6	Cherno More	30	11	11	8	33	26	+7	44 (Note: Head-to-head points: Cherno More 4; Arda 1.)	Qualification for the Conference League group

Source: Soccerway, Bulgarian Football
Rules for classification: 1) Points; 2) Head-to-head points; 3) Head-to-head goal difference; 4) Head-to-head goals scored; 5) Head-to-head away goals scored (only if two teams); 6) Goal difference; 7) Goals scored; 8) Fairplay ranking; 9) Draw

===== Results summary =====
Overall								Home						Away					
Pld	W	D	L	GF	GA	GD	Pts	W	D	L	GF	GA	GD	W	D	L	GF	GA	GD
30	16	8	6	43	23	+20	56	10	4	1	26	9	+17	6	4	5	17	14	+3

Last updated: 13 April 2026.
Source: See results

===== Results by round =====
Round	1	2	3	4	5	6	7	8	9	10	11	12	13	14	15	16	17	18	19	20	21	22	23	24	25	26	27	28	29	30
Ground	A	H	A	H	A	H	A	H	A	A	H	A	H	H	A	H	A	H	A	H	A	H	A	H	H	A	H	A	A	H
Result	D	D	L	D	L	L	D	W	D	D	D	W	W	W	W	W	W	W	L	W	W	W	L	W	W	L	W	W	W	D
Position	9	8	11	12	12	15	14	12	12	11	12	9	8	6	6	6	5	4	5	5	4	3	4	4	4	4	4	4	4	4

Source: See Results
A = Away; H = Home; W = Win; D = Draw; L = Loss

===== Results =====
19 July 2025 1	Botev Plovdiv	1–1	CSKA	Plovdiv
22:00 UTC+3	Minkov 27'; Yordanov (yellow card) 46'; Martinov (yellow card) 80'	Report	Pittas 45+3' (pen.); Lapeña (yellow card) 52'; Pinto (yellow card) 74'; Cooper (yellow card) 75'	Stadium: Stadion Hristo Botev; Attendance: 11,000; Referee: Krasen Georgiev (Varna); Man of the Match: Andrey Yordanov

26 July 2025 2	CSKA	1–1	Spartak	Sofia
21:15 UTC+3	Skarsem 7'; Pittas (penalty missed) 21'	Report	Xandy 47'; Donchev (yellow card) 85'; Yordanov (yellow card) 89'; Kovalyov (yellow card) 90+4'	Stadium: Natsionalen stadion Vasil Levski (Note: From the spring of 2024 CSKA plays their home games at Natsionalen stadion Vasil Levski, Sofia, instead of their regular stadium Stadion Balgarska Armia, Sofia, which is undergoing a major reconstruction.); Attendance: 2,100; Referee: Kristiyan Kolev (Plovdiv); Man of the Match: Xandy

2 August 2025 3	Lokomotiv Plovdiv	1–0	CSKA	Plovdiv
19:00 UTC+3	Cova (yellow card) 56'; Espinoza (yellow card) 69'; Lamy 89'; Milosavljević (yellow card) 90+8'	Report	Seger (yellow card) 56'; Bytyqi (yellow card) 85'	Stadium: Stadion Lokomotiv; Attendance: 2,600; Referee: Dimitar Dimitrov (Sofia); Man of the Match: Julien Lamy

9 August 2025 4	CSKA	0–0	Cherno More	Sofia
19:00 UTC+3	Turitsov (yellow card) 7'; Chorbadzhiyski (yellow card) 88'; Dellova (yellow card) 90+6'	Report	Teles (yellow card) 33'; Cardoso (yellow card) 78'	Stadium: Natsionalen stadion Vasil Levski; Referee: Radoslav Gidzhenov (Plovdiv); Man of the Match: Plamen Iliev

24 August 2025 6	CSKA	0–1	CSKA 1948	Sofia
20:15 UTC+3	Ivanov (yellow card) 78'; Jordão (yellow card) 87'	Report	Diallo 37'; Rusev (yellow card) 44'; Fonkeu (yellow card) 54'; A. Iliev (yellow card) 80'; Marinov (yellow card) 83'	Stadium: Natsionalen stadion Vasil Levski; Attendance: 3,600; Referee: Ventsislav Mitrev (Sofia); Man of the Match: Mamadou Diallo

30 August 2025 7	Slavia	2–2	CSKA	Sofia
21:15 UTC+3	Semedo 27'; Guermouche 38'; Dosso (yellow card) 82'	Report	Eto'o 3', (yellow card) 57' (yellow-red card) 69'; Godoy 52'; Busatto (yellow card) 67'	Stadium: Stadion Aleksandar Shalamanov; Attendance: 2,925; Referee: Georgi Davidov (Veliko Tarnovo); Man of the Match: Kristiyan Balov

13 September 2025 8	CSKA	3–1	Septemvri	Sofia
20:15 UTC+3	Dellova 10'; Pastor (yellow card) 72'; Skarsem (yellow card) 83'; Panayotov 90+4', (yellow card) 90+6'; Brahimi (yellow card) 90+7', (goal) 90+8'; Lapoukhov (yellow card) 90+10'; Turitsov (yellow card) 90+10'	Report	Ochayi (yellow card) 41'; Onasci (yellow card) 79'; Fourrier 84', (yellow card) 90+10'; Serber (yellow card) 90+1'	Stadium: Natsionalen stadion Vasil Levski; Attendance: 3,500; Referee: Martin Markov (Sofia); Man of the Match: Lumbardh Dellova

18 September 2025 5	Arda	1–0	CSKA	Stara Zagora (Note: The game has been moved to Stadion Beroe in Stara Zagora, as Arena Arda in Kardzhali will undergo pitch renovation.)
17:30 UTC+3	Kovachev (yellow card) 5'; Idowu (yellow card) 87'; Eboa Eboa 89'	Report	Martino (yellow card) 32'; Brahimi (yellow card) 90+2'	Stadium: Stadion Beroe; Attendance: 1,500; Referee: Georgi Ginchev (Veliko Tarnovo); Man of the Match: Félix Eboa Eboa
Note: The game has been originally scheduled for 18 August 2025, but has been rescheduled due to Arda's ongoing participation in the 2025–26 UEFA Conference League. On 3 September the technical committee of the BFU rescheduled the game for 18 September 2025.

22 September 2025 9	Botev Vratsa	1–1	CSKA	Vratsa
20:30 UTC+3	Naydenov (yellow card) 41'; Vlajković (yellow card) 48'; Genov 75'; Ivey (yellow card) 90+9'	Report	Jordão (yellow card) 42'; Pittas 49'; Lapeña (yellow card) 81'	Stadium: Stadion Hristo Botev; Attendance: 4,600; Referee: Nikola Popov (Sofia); Man of the Match: Daniel Genov

27 September 2025 10	Lokomotiv Sofia	1–1	CSKA	Sofia
20:00 UTC+3	Bidounga (yellow card) 19'; Minchev 77' (pen.); Katsarov (yellow card) 90+1'	Report	Eto'o (yellow card) 26'; Pittas 43'; Jordão (yellow card) 86'	Stadium: Stadion Lokomotiv; Attendance: 1,900; Referee: Krasen Georgiev (Varna); Man of the Match: Georgi Minchev

5 October 2025 11	CSKA	0–0	Ludogorets	Sofia
20:15 UTC+3	Jordão (yellow card) 18' (yellow-red card) 78'; Martino (yellow card) 45+15'; Seger (yellow card) 59'; Lapeña (yellow card) 63'; Lapoukhov (yellow card) 90+6'	Report	Nachmias (yellow card) 13'; Nedyalkov (yellow card) 45+15'	Stadium: Natsionalen stadion Vasil Levski; Attendance: 5,800; Referee: Dragomir Draganov (Varna); Man of the Match: Fyodor Lapoukhov

19 October 2025 12	Dobrudzha	0–1	CSKA	Dobrich
15:00 UTC+3	Ivanov (yellow card) 19'; Silva (yellow card) 56'; Ndour (yellow card) 69'; Triki (yellow card) 71'; Cardoso (yellow card) 90+1'	Report	Pittas 17'; Brahimi (yellow card) 55'; Martino (yellow card) 86'	Stadium: Stadion Druzhba; Attendance: 6,000; Referee: Mariyan Grebencharski (Samokov); Man of the Match: Ioannis Pittas

26 October 2025 13	CSKA	5–1	Beroe	Sofia
17:15 UTC+2	Dellova (yellow card) 20'; Panayotov 39'; Pittas 45', 51'; I. Iliev 48'; Godoy 59'	Report	Lopes (yellow card) 27'; Costantini (yellow card) 44'; Ferrer 87'	Stadium: Natsionalen stadion Vasil Levski; Referee: Nikola Popov (Sofia); Man of the Match: Petko Panayotov

2 November 2025 14	CSKA	3–1	Montana	Sofia
12:45 UTC+2	Jordão 12'; Godoy 42' (pen.), 90+6' (pen.)	Report	Ejike 35'; Dimitrov (yellow card) 45'; James (red card) 90+5'	Stadium: Natsionalen stadion Vasil Levski; Attendance: 3,000; Referee: Martin Velikov (Varna); Man of the Match: Santiago Godoy

8 November 2025 15	Levski	0–1	CSKA	Sofia
15:00 UTC+2	Petkov (yellow card) 58'; Kostadinov (yellow card) 58'; Dimitrov (yellow card) 63'; Vutsov (yellow card) 90+8'	Report	Dellova (yellow card) 11'; Eto'o (yellow card) 14', (goal) 76'; Martino (yellow card) 58'; Lapeña (yellow card) 58'; Jordão (yellow card) 69'; Pastor (red card) 90+2'; Skarsem (yellow card) 90+6'; Busatto (yellow card) 90+8'	Stadium: Natsionalen stadion Vasil Levski; Attendance: 30,000; Referee: Radoslav Gidzhenov (Plovdiv); Man of the Match: James Eto'o

22 November 2025 16	CSKA	2–1	Botev Plovdiv	Sofia
17:00 UTC+2	Lapeña (yellow card) 48'; Pittas (penalty missed) 71'; Godoy 72', 90+3', (yellow card) 81'	Report	Oko-Flex 6'; Petrov (yellow card) 17'; Noga (yellow card) 33'; Balogiannis (yellow card) 37'; Ojo (yellow card) 42'; Yordanov (yellow card) 69'; Minkov (yellow card) 87'	Stadium: Natsionalen stadion Vasil Levski; Attendance: 4,000; Referee: Gero Piskov (Sofia); Man of the Match: Santiago Godoy

29 November 2025 17	Spartak	0–4	CSKA	Varna
17:30 UTC+2	Budinov (yellow card) 69'; Stojanovski (yellow card) 90'	Report	Jordão 18', (yellow card) 32'; I. Iliev (yellow card) 25'; Panayotov (yellow card) 30'; Eto'o 34'; Godoy 70', 77'	Stadium: Stadion Spartak; Attendance: 3,600; Referee: Ventsislav Mitrev (Sofia); Man of the Match: James Eto'o

3 December 2025 18	CSKA	2–1	Lokomotiv Plovdiv	Sofia
18:00 UTC+2	Godoy 35', 90+5' (pen.), (yellow card) 90+8'	Report	Milosavljević (yellow card) 35'; Itu (yellow card) 48'; Ryan (yellow card) 67'; I. Ivanov (yellow card) 75'; Perea 84'; Ruskov (yellow card) 90'; Espinoza (yellow card) 90+4'	Stadium: Natsionalen stadion Vasil Levski; Attendance: 4,000; Referee: Dimitar Dimitrov (Sofia); Man of the Match: Santiago Godoy

6 December 2025 19	Cherno More	2–0	CSKA	Varna
17:30 UTC+2	Weslen 40', (yellow card) 55'; Lazarov 65'; Donchev (yellow card) 81'	Report	Eto'o (yellow card) 38'; Jordão (yellow card) 62'; Skarsem (yellow card) 67'	Stadium: Stadion Ticha; Attendance: 4,500; Referee: Lyuboslav Lyubomirov (Pernik); Man of the Match: Weslen Júnior

6 February 2026 20	CSKA	3–1	Arda	Sofia
17:45 UTC+2	Pittas 44', (yellow card) 56'; Eto'o (yellow card) 45+2'; Dellova 53'; Pereira 71'	Report	Kabov 22'; Kovachev (yellow card) 41'; Idowu (yellow card) 43'; Eboa Eboa (yellow card) 62'; Velyev (yellow card) 83'	Stadium: Natsionalen stadion Vasil Levski; Attendance: 2,914; Referee: Georgi Kabakov (Plovdiv); Man of the Match: Léo Pereira

14 February 2026 21	CSKA 1948	0–2	CSKA	Bistritsa
14:45 UTC+2	Hoffmann (yellow card) 36'; Franco (yellow card) 79'; Gašević (yellow card) 80'	Report	Martino (yellow card) 18'; Pereira 45+1'; Eto'o (yellow card) 56'; Ebong (yellow card) 65', (goal) 89'; Godoy (yellow card) 73'	Stadium: Stadion Bistritsa; Attendance: 500; Referee: Ventsislav Mitrev (Sofia); Man of the Match: Léo Pereira

21 February 2026 22	CSKA	1–0	Slavia	Sofia
17:30 UTC+2	Pereira (yellow card) 42'; Piedrahita 82'	Report	Minchev (yellow card) 34'; Stoev (yellow card) 40'; Dosso (yellow card) 50'	Stadium: Natsionalen stadion Vasil Levski; Attendance: 2,600; Referee: Georgi Stoyanov (Plovdiv); Man of the Match: Alejandro Piedrahita

28 February 2026 23	Septemvri	2–0	CSKA	Sofia
17:30 UTC+2	Ozornwafor (yellow card) 33'; Fourrier 57'; Fontaine 90+2'	Report	Ebong (yellow card) 33'; Brahimi (yellow card) 45+1'	Stadium: Natsionalen stadion Vasil Levski (Note: Septemvri plays this game at Natsionalen stadion Vasil Levski, Sofia, instead of their regular stadium Stadion DIT, Sofia, which cannot accommodate the large away support.); Attendance: 2,900; Referee: Nikola Popov (Sofia); Man of the Match: Bertrand Fourrier

4 March 2026 24	CSKA	1–0	Botev Vratsa	Sofia
18:30 UTC+2	Godoy 69'	Report	Petkov (yellow card) 58'; Goranov (yellow card) 71'	Stadium: Natsionalen stadion Vasil Levski; Attendance: 2,500; Referee: Martin Markov (Sofia); Man of the Match: Santiago Godoy

8 March 2026 25	CSKA	2–0	Lokomotiv Sofia	Sofia
17:45 UTC+2	Eto'o 13'; Dellova (yellow card) 76'; Piedrahita 81'	Report	Dost (yellow card) 90+3'	Stadium: Natsionalen stadion Vasil Levski; Attendance: 3,700; Referee: Dragomir Draganov (Varna); Man of the Match: James Eto'o

14 March 2026 26	Ludogorets	3–0	CSKA	Razgrad
17:45 UTC+2	Verdon (yellow card) 19'; Kaloč (yellow card) 28'; Duah 31'; Stanić 42'; Rwan Cruz 71' (pen.), (yellow card) 80'; Duarte (yellow card) 79'; Almeida (yellow card) 90+1'	Report	Piedrahita (yellow card) 79'; Eto'o (yellow card) 80'	Stadium: Huvepharma Arena; Attendance: 6,000; Referee: Lyuboslav Lyubomirov (Pernik); Man of the Match: Petar Stanić

22 March 2026 27	CSKA	2–0	Dobrudzha	Sofia
15:00 UTC+2	Ebong 45+1'; Rodríguez (yellow card) 47'; Godoy 69' (pen.); Dellova (yellow card) 90+2'	Report		Stadium: Natsionalen stadion Vasil Levski; Attendance: 2,600; Referee: Georgi Ginchev (Veliko Tarnovo); Man of the Match: Santiago Godoy

4 April 2026 28	Beroe	0–3	CSKA	Stara Zagora
19:30 UTC+3	Valverde (yellow card) 45'; Varela (yellow card) 50'; Milheirão (yellow card) 76'	Report	Lapeña 4'; Pereira (yellow card) 44'; Jordão (yellow card) 54'; Brahimi 81', (yellow card) 85'; Pittas 90+2' (pen.)	Stadium: Stadion Beroe; Referee: Todor Kirov (Varna); Man of the Match: Adrián Lapeña

8 April 2026 29	Montana	0–1	CSKA	Montana
18:00 UTC+3	Rosa (yellow card) 58'	Report	Martino (yellow card) 84'; Pereira (yellow card) 87'; Panayotov 90+4'	Stadium: Stadion Ogosta; Referee: Ventsislav Mitrev (Sofia); Man of the Match: Petko Panayotov

13 April 2026 30	CSKA	1–1	Levski	Sofia
16:00 UTC+3	Martino (yellow card) 59'; Godoy 90+4'	Report	Perea 71'; Bouras (yellow card) 78'	Stadium: Natsionalen stadion Vasil Levski; Referee: Mariyan Grebencharski (Samokov); Man of the Match: Santiago Godoy

==== Championship round ====
===== League table =====
Pos	Team	Pld	W	D	L	GF	GA	GD	Pts	Qualification
1	Levski Sofia (C)	36	25	6	5	71	25	+46	81	Qualification for the Champions League first qualifying round
2	CSKA 1948	36	20	7	9	54	35	+19	67 (Note: Head to head points: CSKA 1948 9, Ludogorets Razgrad 3.)	Qualification for the Conference League second qualifying round
3	Ludogorets (O)	36	19	10	7	61	25	+36	67	Qualification for the Conference League play-off
4	CSKA Sofia	36	18	9	9	47	30	+17	63	Qualification for the Europa League first qualifying round (Note: The winners of the 2025–26 Bulgarian Cup (CSKA Sofia) qualified for the Europa League first qualifying round.)

Source: soccerway, Bulgarian Football
Rules for classification: 1) Points; 2) Points in regular season and second phase; 3) Head-to-head points in regular season and second phase; 4) Head-to-head goal difference in regular season and second phase; 5) Head-to-head goals scored in regular season and second phase; 6) Head-to-head away goals scored in regular season and second phase (if two teams tied); 7) Goal difference; 8) Goals scored; 9) Fair play ranking; 10) Drawing of lots.
(C) Champions; (O) Play-off winners

===== Results summary =====
Overall								Home						Away					
Pld	W	D	L	GF	GA	GD	Pts	W	D	L	GF	GA	GD	W	D	L	GF	GA	GD
6	2	1	3	4	7	−3	7	1	1	1	3	4	−1	1	0	2	1	3	−2

Last updated: 25 May 2026.
Source: See results

===== Results by round =====
Round	1	2	3	4	5	6
Ground	H	H	A	H	A	A
Result	L	W	W	D	L	L
Position	4	4	3	3	4	4

Source: See Results
A = Away; H = Home; W = Win; D = Draw; L = Loss

===== Results =====
25 April 2026 31	CSKA	1–3	Levski	Sofia
16:00 UTC+3	Makoun 11' (o.g.); Yordanov (yellow card) 35'; Brahimi (yellow card) 45+3'; Piedrahita (yellow card) 59'; Panayotov (yellow card) 84'	Report	Kamdem (yellow card) 35'; Bala 42'; Bouras 45'; Soula 80'	Stadium: Natsionalen stadion Vasil Levski; Referee: Vasil Minev (Sofia); Man of the Match: Akram Bouras

3 May 2026 32	CSKA	1–0	Ludogorets	Sofia
19:00 UTC+3	Brahimi 11'; Jordão (yellow card) 56'; Piedrahita (yellow card) 66'; Martino (yellow card) 76'; Rodríguez (yellow card) 86'	Report	Tekpetey (yellow card) 23'; Marcus (yellow card) 61'; Bonmann (yellow card) 79'; Nedyalkov (yellow card) 90+1'	Stadium: Natsionalen stadion Vasil Levski; Referee: Mariyan Grebencharski (Samokov); Man of the Match: Mohamed Brahimi

8 May 2026 33	CSKA 1948	0–1	CSKA	Bistritsa
20:00 UTC+3	Krebs (yellow card) 65'	Report	Brahimi 58'; Ivanov (yellow card) 72'; Eto'o (yellow card) 81'; Godoy (yellow card) 81'; Pereira (yellow card) 84'; Ebong (yellow card) 90+1'	Stadium: Stadion Bistritsa; Referee: Dimitar Dimitrov (Sofia); Man of the Match: Mohamed Brahimi

13 May 2026 34	CSKA	1–1	CSKA 1948	Sofia
17:45 UTC+3	Ebong 66'; Dellova (yellow card) 80'	Report	S. Aleksandrov (yellow card) 16'; Diallo 34' (pen.); Vitanov (yellow card) 72'	Stadium: Natsionalen stadion Vasil Levski; Referee: Martin Velikov (Varna); Man of the Match: Max Ebong

16 May 2026 35	Levski	2–0	CSKA	Sofia
16:00 UTC+3	Perea 11'; Sangaré (yellow card) 53'; Bala 74' (pen.); Maicon (yellow card) 90+1'	Report	Ebong (yellow card) 53'; Pittas (yellow card) 63'; Panayotov (yellow card) 90+2'	Stadium: Natsionalen stadion Vasil Levski; Referee: Radoslav Gidzhenov (Plovdiv); Man of the Match: Juan Perea

25 May 2026 36	Ludogorets	1−0	CSKA	Razgrad
20:30 UTC+3	Stanić (yellow card) 83'; Chochev 90+4'; Marcus (yellow card) 90+6'	Report	Rodríguez (yellow card) 72'	Stadium: Huvepharma Arena; Referee: Stoyan Arsov (Sofia); Man of the Match: Ivaylo Chochev

=== Bulgarian Cup ===
29 October 2025 1R	Sevlievo	1–2	CSKA	Sevlievo
13:30 UTC+3	Makaveev (yellow card) 27'; Ganev (yellow card) 36'; Yankov (yellow card) 45'; Petrov 65'; Dobrev (yellow card) 76'	Report	Sanyang 38'; Brahimi 60'	Stadium: Stadion Rakovski; Referee: Stanimir Trenchev (Sofia)

13 December 2025 2R	CSKA	2–1	Lokomotiv Sofia	Sofia
18:00 UTC+2	Dembélé 29' (o.g.); Yanev (yellow card) 52'; Jordão (yellow card) 54', (goal) 69'	Report	Delev 6'; Galchev (yellow card) 58'; Stanoev (yellow card) 61'; Luann (yellow card) 89'	Stadium: Natsionalen stadion Vasil Levski; Referee: Mariyan Grebencharski (Samokov)

10 February 2026 QF	CSKA	2–0	CSKA 1948	Sofia
18:00 UTC+2	Pittas 9'; Solet (yellow card) 44'; Pereira (yellow card) 61'; Ebong 74'	Report	Franco (yellow card) 51'	Stadium: Natsionalen stadion Vasil Levski; Referee: Radoslav Gidzhenov (Plovdiv); Man of the Match: Max Ebong

21 April 2026 SF Leg 1	Ludogorets	1–2	CSKA	Razgrad
19:00 UTC+3	Duah 18'; Stanić (yellow card) 20'; Tekpetey (yellow card) 87'; Rwan Cruz (yellow card) 87'; Nogueira (yellow card) 90+4'	Report	Jordão (yellow card) 37' (yellow-red card) 90+5'; Eto'o (yellow card) 56'; Martino (yellow card) 59' (yellow-red card) 90+6'; Pittas 82', (yellow card) 90+3'; Godoy 84'; Evtimov (yellow card) 87'; Rodríguez (yellow card) 90'	Stadium: Huvepharma Arena; Referee: Kristiyan Kolev (Plovdiv)

29 April 2026 SF Leg 2	CSKA	0–0 (2–1 agg.)	Ludogorets	Sofia
19:00 UTC+3	Eto'o (yellow card) 58'; Rodríguez (yellow card) 85'; Martino (yellow card) 90+1'; Lapoukhov (yellow card) 90+5'	Report	Chochev (yellow card) 37'; Duah (yellow card) 42'	Stadium: Natsionalen stadion Vasil Levski; Referee: Gero Piskov (Sofia)

20 May 2026 Final	Lokomotiv Plovdiv	1–1 (a.e.t.) (3–4 p)	CSKA	Sofia
19:00 UTC+3	Lucas Ryan 47', (yellow card) 94'; Itu (yellow card) 64'; Ali (yellow card) 48'; Chindriș (yellow card) 70'; Cova (yellow card) 78'	Report	Godoy 11'; Brahimi (yellow card) 63'; Ivanov (yellow card) 97'	Stadium: Natsionalen stadion Vasil Levski; Referee: Mariyan Grebencharski (Samokov)
	Penalties
	Iliev (penalty missed); Lucas Ryan (penalty scored); Chindriș (penalty scored); Zwarts (penalty scored); Dinev (penalty missed)		(penalty missed) Jordão; (penalty scored) Ebong; (penalty scored) Ivanov; (penalty scored) Godoy; (penalty scored) Eto'o

== Statistics ==
=== Appearances and goals ===
No.	Pos	Nat	Player	Total		Parva Liga		Bulgarian Cup	
No.	Pos	Nat	Player	Apps	Goals	Apps	Goals	Apps	Goals
2	DF	(Brazil) BRA	Pastor	37	0	26+6	0	5	0
3	DF	(Bulgaria) BUL	Andrey Yordanov	10	0	2+7	0	0+1	0
4	DF	(Spain) ESP	Adrián Lapeña	28	1	19+5	1	2+2	0
5	DF	(Kosovo) KOS	Lumbardh Dellova	32	2	29+1	2	1+1	0
6	MF	(Portugal) POR	Bruno Jordão	30	3	25	2	5	1
7	MF	(Norway) NOR	Olaus Skarsem	15	1	8+6	1	1	0
9	FW	(Argentina) ARG	Santiago Godoy	34	15	21+7	13	5+1	2
10	MF	(Belarus) BLR	Max Ebong	21	4	15+2	3	4	1
11	MF	(France) FRA	Mohamed Brahimi	30	5	12+12	4	4+2	1
14	DF	(Bulgaria) BUL	Teodor Ivanov	32	0	21+5	0	5+1	0
17	DF	(Argentina) ARG	Ángelo Martino	31	0	26	0	5	0
19	DF	(Bulgaria) BUL	Ivan Turitsov	20	0	11+8	0	1	0
21	GK	(Belarus) BLR	Fyodor Lapoukhov	34	-24	29	-21	5	-3
23	MF	(Bulgaria) BUL	Ilian Antonov	3	0	0+3	0	0	0
24	DF	(Bulgaria) BUL	Yulian Iliev	1	0	0+1	0	0	0
25	GK	(Bulgaria) BUL	Dimitar Evtimov	1	-3	1	-3	0	0
28	FW	(Cyprus) CYP	Ioannis Pittas	42	10	28+8	8	3+3	2
29	FW	(Bulgaria) BUL	Ivan Tasev	5	0	3+2	0	0	0
30	MF	(Bulgaria) BUL	Petko Panayotov	35	3	15+16	3	1+3	0
32	DF	(Argentina) ARG	Facundo Rodríguez	14	0	7+4	0	3	0
34	MF	(Bulgaria) BUL	Vasil Kaymakanov	1	0	0+1	0	0	0
38	FW	(Brazil) BRA	Léo Pereira	20	2	12+4	2	3+1	0
73	MF	(Bulgaria) BUL	Ilian Iliev	27	1	11+13	1	2+1	0
77	FW	(Colombia) COL	Alejandro Piedrahita	18	2	11+5	2	0+2	0
91	DF	(Bulgaria) BUL	Aleks Tunchev	1	0	0+1	0	0	0
94	MF	(Central African Republic) CAF	Isaac Solet	15	0	5+9	0	1	0
99	MF	(Cameroon) CMR	James Eto'o	37	4	27+4	4	5+1	0
Players who appeared for CSKA Sofia that left during the season:
1	GK	(Brazil) BRA	Gustavo Busatto	7	-7	6	-6	1	-1
3	DF	(The Gambia) GAM	Sainey Sanyang	10	1	6+3	0	1	1
6	DF	(Scotland) SCO	Liam Cooper	2	0	2	0	0	0
8	MF	(Sweden) SWE	David Seger	15	0	11+3	0	1	0
11	FW	(Kosovo) KOS	Zymer Bytyqi	1	0	0+1	0	0	0
12	GK	(Bulgaria) BUL	Marin Orlinov	0	0	0	0	0	0
13	DF	(Colombia) COL	Brayan Córdoba	4	0	1+2	0	1	0
15	DF	(France) FRA	Thibaut Vion	3	0	2+1	0	0	0
16	MF	(Bulgaria) BUL	Georgi Chorbadzhiyski	7	0	0+6	0	1	0
17	FW	(Democratic Republic of the Congo) COD	Jason Lokilo	1	0	0+1	0	0	0
18	DF	(Luxembourg) LUX	Mica Pinto	2	0	2	0	0	0
20	DF	(Bulgaria) BUL	Martin Stoychev	3	0	0+2	0	0+1	0
22	FW	(Albania) ALB	Kevin Dodaj	8	0	2+6	0	0	0
91	FW	(Bulgaria) BUL	Yoan Bornosuzov	2	0	0+2	0	0	0

=== Goalscorers ===
Rank	Pos	Nat	No	Name	Parva Liga	Bulgarian Cup	Total
1	FW	(Argentina)	9	Santiago Godoy	13	2	15
2	FW	(Cyprus)	28	Ioannis Pittas	8	2	10
3	MF	(France)	11	Mohamed Brahimi	4	1	5
4	MF	(Belarus)	10	Max Ebong	3	1	4
4	MF	(Cameroon)	99	James Eto'o	4	0	4
6	MF	(Portugal)	6	Bruno Jordão	2	1	3
6	MF	(Bulgaria)	30	Petko Panayotov	3	0	3
8	DF	(Kosovo)	5	Lumbardh Dellova	2	0	2
8	MF	(Brazil)	38	Léo Pereira	2	0	2
8	FW	(Colombia)	77	Alejandro Piedrahita	2	0	2
11	DF	(The Gambia)	3	Sainey Sanyang	0	1	1
11	DF	(Spain)	4	Adrián Lapeña	1	0	1
11	MF	(Norway)	7	Olaus Skarsem	1	0	1
11	MF	(Bulgaria)	73	Ilian Iliev	1	0	1
				Own goal	1	1	2
Total					47	9	56

As of 25 May 2026

=== Clean sheets ===
Rank	Nat	No	Name	Parva Liga	Bulgarian Cup	Total
1	(Belarus)	21	Fyodor Lapoukhov	13	2	15
2	(Brazil)	1	Gustavo Busatto	1	0	1
Total				14	2	16

As of 25 May 2026

=== Disciplinary Record ===
Includes all competitive matches. Players listed below made at least one appearance for CSKA first squad during the season.

N	P	Nat.	Name	Parva Liga			Bulgarian Cup			Total			Notes
N	P	Nat.	Name	Yellow card	Second yellow card	Red card	Yellow card	Second yellow card	Red card	Yellow card	Second yellow card	Red card	Notes
1	GK	(Brazil)	Gustavo Busatto	2						2			
2	DF	(Brazil)	Pastor	1		1				1		1	
3	DF	(Bulgaria)	Andrey Yordanov	1						1			
4	DF	(Spain)	Adrián Lapeña	5						5			
5	DF	(Kosovo)	Lumbardh Dellova	6						6			
6	MF	(Portugal)	Bruno Jordão	9	1		2	1		11	2		
6	DF	(Scotland)	Liam Cooper	1						1			
7	MF	(Norway)	Olaus Skarsem	3						3			
8	MF	(Sweden)	David Seger	2						2			
9	FW	(Argentina)	Santiago Godoy	4						4			
10	MF	(Belarus)	Max Ebong	4						4			
11	MF	(France)	Mohamed Brahimi	6			1			7			
11	FW	(Kosovo)	Zymer Bytyqi	1						1			
14	DF	(Bulgaria)	Teodor Ivanov	2			1			3			
16	MF	(Bulgaria)	Georgi Chorbadzhiyski	1						1			
17	DF	(Argentina)	Ángelo Martino	8			2	1		10	1		
18	DF	(Luxembourg)	Mica Pinto	1						1			
19	DF	(Bulgaria)	Ivan Turitsov	2						2			
21	GK	(Belarus)	Fyodor Lapoukhov	2			1			3			
25	GK	(Bulgaria)	Dimitar Evtimov				1			1			
28	FW	(Cyprus)	Ioannis Pittas	2						2			
30	MF	(Bulgaria)	Petko Panayotov	4						4			
32	DF	(Argentina)	Facundo Rodríguez	3			2			5			
38	FW	(Brazil)	Léo Pereira	4			1			5			
73	MF	(Bulgaria)	Ilian Iliev	1						1			
77	FW	(Colombia)	Alejandro Piedrahita	3						3			
94	MF	(Central African Republic)	Isaac Solet				1			1			
99	MF	(Cameroon)	James Eto'o	8	1		2			10	1		
M		(Bulgaria)	Hristo Yanev				1			1			

Last updated: 25 May 2026
Source: Competitive matches
Only competitive matches
(yellow card) = Number of bookings; (second yellow card) = Number of sending offs after a second yellow card; (red card) = Number of sending offs by a direct red card.

== See also ==
- PFC CSKA Sofia
