= Yulian Iliev =

Bulgarian footballer

Personal information
- Full name: Yulian Tihomirov Iliev
- Date of birth: 9 December 2004 (age 21)
- Place of birth: Sofia, Bulgaria
- Height: 1.87 m (6 ft 2 in)
- Positions: Midfielder; defender

Team information
- Current team: Lokomotiv Plovdiv (on loan from CSKA Sofia)
- Number: 10

Youth career
- 2012–2018: Levski Sofia
- 2018–2024: CSKA Sofia

Senior career*
| Years | Team | Apps | (Gls) |
| 2022– | CSKA Sofia II | 129 | (14) |
| 2024– | CSKA Sofia | 3 | (0) |
| 2025 | CSKA Sofia III | 6 | (2) |
| 2026– | → Lokomotiv Plovdiv (loan) | 5 | (0) |
- * Club domestic league appearances and goals as of 14:18, 9 November 2026 (UTC) ‡ National team caps and goals as of 06:16, 20 July 2024 (UTC)

Yulian Tihomirov Iliev (Bulgarian: Юлиан Тихомиров Илиев; born 9 December 2004) is a Bulgarian footballer who plays as a midfielder for Lokomotiv Plovdiv, on loan from CSKA Sofia.

== Career ==
Iliev went through the youth academies of Levski Sofia. In 2018 he made a transfer to CSKA Sofia where he made over 60 appearances for the second team in the third league. He was moved to the first team for the 2024–25 season.

== Career statistics ==
As of 7 November 2026

Appearances and goals by club, season and competition
| Club | Season | League | | | National cup | | Europe | | Other | | Total | |
| Club | Season | Division | Apps | Goals | Apps | Goals | Apps | Goals | Apps | Goals | Apps | Goals |
|---|---|---|---|---|---|---|---|---|---|---|---|---|
| CSKA Sofia II | 2022–23 | Third League | 30 | 4 | – | | – | | – | | 30 | 4 |
| CSKA Sofia II | 2023–24 | Third League | 36 | 5 | – | | – | | – | | 36 | 5 |
| CSKA Sofia II | 2024–25 | Second League | 27 | 2 | – | | – | | – | | 27 | 2 |
| CSKA Sofia II | 2025–26 | Second League | 29 | 3 | – | | – | | – | | 29 | 3 |
| CSKA Sofia II | 2026–27 | Second League | 8 | 0 | – | | – | | – | | 8 | 0 |
| CSKA Sofia II | Total | | 129 | 14 | 0 | 0 | 0 | 0 | 0 | 0 | 129 | 14 |
| CSKA Sofia | 2024–25 | First League | 2 | 0 | 0 | 0 | – | | – | | 2 | 0 |
| CSKA Sofia | 2025–26 | First League | 1 | 0 | 0 | 0 | – | | – | | 1 | 0 |
| CSKA Sofia | Total | | 3 | 0 | 0 | 0 | 0 | 0 | 0 | 0 | 3 | 0 |
| CSKA Sofia III | 2024–25 | Third League | 6 | 2 | – | | – | | – | | 6 | 2 |
| Lokomotiv Plovdiv (loan) | 2026–27 | First League | 5 | 0 | 1 | 0 | – | | – | | 6 | 0 |
| Career total | | | 144 | 16 | 1 | 0 | 0 | 0 | 0 | 0 | 145 | 16 |
