= Kevin Dodaj =

Albanian footballer

Personal information
- Date of birth: 3 September 2005 (age 21)
- Place of birth: Tirana, Albania
- Height: 1.75 m (5 ft 9 in)
- Position: Forward

Team information
- Current team: Lechia Gdańsk (on loan from CSKA Sofia)
- Number: 7

Senior career*
Years	Team	Apps	(Gls)
2023–2024	Vllaznia Shkodër U21	7	(3)
2023–2025	Vllaznia Shkodër	45	(7)
2025–	CSKA Sofia	8	(0)
2026	→ Vllaznia Shkodër (loan)	17	(4)
2026–	→ Lechia Gdańsk (loan)	10	(4)

International career^{‡}
2023	Albania U19	1	(0)
2024–	Albania U21	16	(4)
- * Club domestic league appearances and goals as of 12:15, 9 November 2026 (UTC) ‡ National team caps and goals as of 23:29, 17 November 2026 (UTC)

Kevin Dodaj (born 3 September 2005) is an Albanian professional footballer who plays as a forward for I liga club Lechia Gdańsk, on loan from CSKA Sofia.

== Club career ==
On 22 July 2025, Dodaj signed for Bulgarian club CSKA Sofia.

On 14 August 2026, he joined Polish second division club Lechia Gdańsk on loan for the rest of the season, with an option to buy.

== Career statistics ==
As of match played 8 November 2026

Appearances and goals by club, season and competition
Club	Season	League			National cup (Note: Includes Albanian Cup, Polish Cup)		Continental		Other		Total	
Club	Season	Division	Apps	Goals	Apps	Goals	Apps	Goals	Apps	Goals	Apps	Goals
Vllaznia Shkodër U21	2023–24	Kategoria Superiore U-21	6	2	—		—		—		6	2
Vllaznia Shkodër U21	2024–25	Kategoria Superiore U-21	1	1	—		—		—		1	1
Vllaznia Shkodër U21	Total		7	3	—		—		—		7	3
Vllaznia Shkodër	2023–24	Kategoria Superiore	9	1	1	0	0	0	—		10	1
Vllaznia Shkodër	2024–25	Kategoria Superiore	36	6	5	0	2 (Note: Appearances in UEFA Conference League)	1	—		43	7
Vllaznia Shkodër	2025–26	Kategoria Superiore	—		—		2	1	—		2	1
Vllaznia Shkodër	Total		45	7	6	0	4	2	—		55	9
CSKA Sofia	2025–26	First League	8	0	0	0	—		—		8	0
Vllaznia Shkodër (loan)	2025–26	Kategoria Superiore	17	4	4	0	—		—		21	4
Lechia Gdańsk (loan)	2026–27	I liga	10	4	2	0	—		—		12	4
Career total			88	18	11	0	4	2	0	0	103	20
