= Sevi Idriz =

Association football player (born 2007)

Personal information
- Full name: Sevi Sevitin Idriz
- Date of birth: 16 November 2007 (age 18)
- Place of birth: Madrid, Spain
- Height: 1.85 m (6 ft 1 in)
- Position: Forward

Team information
- Current team: Lokomotiv Plovdiv
- Number: 7

Youth career
- –2019: Belomorets Asenovgrad
- 2019–2022: Lokomotiv Plovdiv
- 2022–2024: CSKA 1948

Senior career*
Years	Team	Apps	(Gls)
2023–2025	CSKA 1948 III	45	(3)
2024–2025	CSKA 1948 II	16	(2)
2025–	Lokomotiv Plovdiv	20	(4)

International career
2025–	Bulgaria U19	7	(1)
2026–	Bulgaria U21	1	(0)
- * Club domestic league appearances and goals as of 12:24, 31 May 2026 (UTC)

Sevi Sevitin Idriz (Bulgarian: Севи Севитин Идриз; born 16 November 2007) is a professional footballer who plays as a forward for Lokomotiv Plovdiv. Born in Spain, he has represented Bulgaria internationally at youth level.

== Career ==
Born in Madrid to Bulgarian parents of Turkish origin, he returned to Bulgaria at an early age to begin his youth career at Belomorets Asenovgrad. He moved to Lokomotiv Plovdiv in 2019, before joining CSKA 1948 in 2022. In 2025, Idriz returned to Lokomotiv and made his professional debut for the club in a league match against Beroe. In January 2026, he signed his first professional contract with the club.

== Career statistics ==
As of 12 May 2026

Appearances and goals by club, season and competition
Club	Season	League			National cup		Europe		Other		Total	
Club	Season	Division	Apps	Goals	Apps	Goals	Apps	Goals	Apps	Goals	Apps	Goals
CSKA 1948 III	2023–24	Third League	21	1	–		–		–		21	1
CSKA 1948 III	2024–25	Third League	24	2	–		–		–		24	2
CSKA 1948 III	Total		45	3	0	0	0	0	0	0	45	3
CSKA 1948 II	2023–24	Second League	4	2	–		–		–		4	2
CSKA 1948 II	2024–25	Second League	12	0	–		–		–		12	0
CSKA 1948 II	Total		16	2	0	0	0	0	0	0	16	2
Lokomotiv Plovdiv	2025–26	First League	18	4	4	1	–		–		22	5
Career total			75	9	4	1	0	0	0	0	79	10
