= Ángelo Martino =

Argentine footballer

Personal information
- Date of birth: 5 June 1998 (age 28)
- Place of birth: Rafaela, Argentina
- Height: 1.78 m (5 ft 10 in)
- Position: Left-back

Team information
- Current team: CSKA Sofia
- Number: 17

Youth career
- Atlético de Rafaela

Senior career*
| Years | Team | Apps | (Gls) |
| 2017–2021 | Atlético de Rafaela | 46 | (2) |
| 2021–2023 | Talleres | 57 | (1) |
| 2023–2025 | Newell's Old Boys | 70 | (1) |
| 2025– | CSKA Sofia | 37 | (1) |
- * Club domestic league appearances and goals as of 17:45, 22 November 2026 (UTC)

Ángelo Martino (born 5 June 1998) is an Argentine professional footballer who plays as a left-back for Bulgarian First League club CSKA Sofia.

== Career ==
Martino started his career with Atlético de Rafaela, appearing for the first time on 13 March 2017 in a Primera División match against Aldosivi. He scored his first senior goal on 15 April versus Independiente, with Rafaela later ending the campaign with relegation to Primera B Nacional. He featured thirty-seven times across the next four campaigns in all competitions at that level, whilst also scoring two further goals; against Brown and Defensores de Belgrano (cup).

On 25 February 2021, Martino headed back to the Primera División after agreeing a four-year contract with Talleres; having paid to terminate his Rafaela contract five months early. He made his Talleres debut on 27 February in a 2–2 draw in the Copa de la Liga Profesional against Newell's Old Boys, after the left-back replaced Augusto Schott off the bench with ten minutes remaining.

== Career statistics ==
As of 22 November 2026.

Club statistics
| Club | Season | League | | | Cup | | League Cup | | Continental | | Other | | Total | |
| Club | Season | Division | Apps | Goals | Apps | Goals | Apps | Goals | Apps | Goals | Apps | Goals | Apps | Goals |
|---|---|---|---|---|---|---|---|---|---|---|---|---|---|---|
| Atlético de Rafaela | 2016–17 | Primera División | 13 | 1 | 0 | 0 | — | | — | | — | | 13 | 1 |
| Atlético de Rafaela | 2017–18 | Primera Nacional | 8 | 0 | 0 | 0 | — | | — | | — | | 8 | 0 |
| Atlético de Rafaela | 2018–19 | Primera Nacional | 11 | 1 | 3 | 1 | — | | — | | — | | 14 | 2 |
| Atlético de Rafaela | 2019–20 | Primera Nacional | 6 | 0 | 0 | 0 | — | | — | | — | | 6 | 0 |
| Atlético de Rafaela | 2020 | Primera Nacional | 8 | 0 | 0 | 0 | 7 | 0 | — | | — | | 15 | 0 |
| Atlético de Rafaela | Total | | 46 | 2 | 3 | 1 | 7 | 0 | 0 | 0 | 0 | 0 | 56 | 3 |
| Talleres | 2021 | Primera División | 32 | 1 | 6 | 0 | — | | 4 | 1 | — | | 42 | 2 |
| Talleres | 2022 | Primera División | 24 | 0 | 1 | 0 | — | | 6 | 1 | — | | 31 | 1 |
| Talleres | 2023 | Primera División | 1 | 0 | 0 | 0 | — | | — | | — | | 1 | 0 |
| Talleres | Total | | 57 | 1 | 7 | 0 | 0 | 0 | 10 | 1 | 0 | 0 | 74 | 3 |
| Newell's Old Boys | 2023 | Primera División | 25 | 1 | 1 | 0 | — | | 6 | 0 | — | | 32 | 1 |
| Newell's Old Boys | 2024 | Primera División | 34 | 0 | 3 | 0 | — | | — | | — | | 37 | 0 |
| Newell's Old Boys | 2025 | Primera División | 11 | 0 | 2 | 0 | — | | — | | — | | 13 | 0 |
| Newell's Old Boys | Total | | 70 | 1 | 6 | 0 | 0 | 0 | 6 | 0 | 0 | 0 | 82 | 1 |
| CSKA Sofia | 2025–26 | First League | 26 | 0 | 5 | 0 | — | | — | | 0 | 0 | 31 | 0 |
| CSKA Sofia | 2026–27 | First League | 11 | 1 | 1 | 0 | 0 | 0 | 9 | 0 | 1 | 0 | 22 | 1 |
| CSKA Sofia | Total | | 37 | 1 | 6 | 0 | 0 | 0 | 9 | 0 | 1 | 0 | 53 | 1 |
| Career total | | | 210 | 5 | 22 | 1 | 7 | 0 | 25 | 2 | 1 | 0 | 267 | 8 |

== Honours ==
CSKA Sofia

- Bulgarian Cup: 2025–26
- Bulgarian Supercup: 2026
