= Petko Panayotov =

Bulgarian footballer

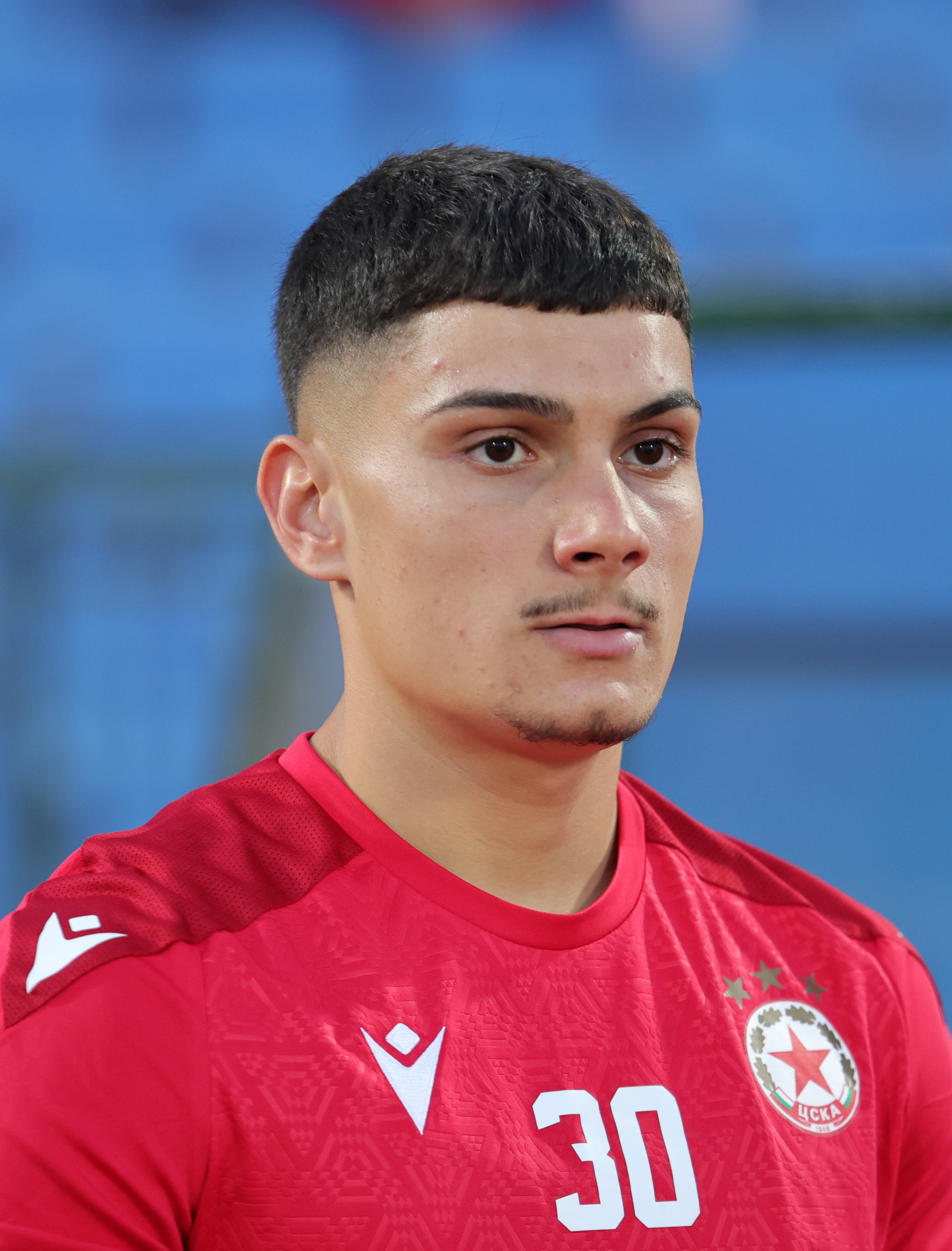

Personal information
- Full name: Petko Hristov Panayotov
- Date of birth: 20 July 2005 (age 21)
- Place of birth: Sofia, Bulgaria
- Height: 1.78 m (5 ft 10 in)
- Position: Midfielder

Team information
- Current team: CSKA Sofia
- Number: 30

Youth career
- –2022: Levski Sofia
- 2022–2024: CSKA Sofia

Senior career*
Years	Team	Apps	(Gls)
2022–2025	CSKA Sofia II	69	(10)
2024–	CSKA Sofia	59	(5)

International career^{‡}
2025–	Bulgaria U21	9	(1)
2026–	Bulgaria	6	(0)
- * Club domestic league appearances and goals as of 17:07, 22 November 2026 (UTC) ‡ National team caps and goals as of 22:54, 6 October 2026 (UTC)

Petko Hristov Panayotov (Bulgarian: Петко Христов Панайотов; born 20 July 2005) is a Bulgarian professional footballer who plays as a midfielder for CSKA Sofia.

== Career ==
Panayotov went through the youth academies of Levski Sofia. In 2022 he made a transfer to CSKA Sofia where he made over 50 appearances for the second team in the third league. He was moved to the first team for the 2024–25 season.

On 1 June 2026, Panayotov earned his first cap for Bulgaria, appearing as a starter and playing the first 80 minutes in the 0–1 loss against Montenegro in a friendly match.

== Career statistics ==
=== Club ===
As of 22 November 2026

Appearances and goals by club, season and competition
Club	Season	League			National cup		Europe		Other		Total	
Club	Season	Division	Apps	Goals	Apps	Goals	Apps	Goals	Apps	Goals	Apps	Goals
CSKA Sofia II	2022–23	Third League	24	5	–		–		–		24	5
CSKA Sofia II	2023–24	Third League	30	4	–		–		–		30	4
CSKA Sofia II	2024–25	Second League	14	1	–		–		–		14	1
CSKA Sofia II	2025–26	Second League	1	0	–		–		–		1	0
CSKA Sofia II	Total		69	10	0	0	0	0	0	0	69	10
CSKA Sofia	2023–24	First League	1	0	0	0	0	0	1	0	2	0
CSKA Sofia	2024–25	First League	18	1	3	0	–		1	0	22	1
CSKA Sofia	2025–26	First League	31	3	4	0	–		–		35	3
CSKA Sofia	2026–27	First League	9	1	0	0	5	0	0	0	14	1
CSKA Sofia	Total		59	5	7	0	5	0	2	0	73	5
Career total			127	15	7	0	5	0	2	0	142	15

=== International ===
As of match played 6 October 2026

Appearances and goals by national team and year
National team	Year	Apps	Goals
Bulgaria
Bulgaria	2026	6	0
Total		6	0

== Honours ==
CSKA Sofia

- Bulgarian Cup: 2025–26
- Bulgarian Supercup: 2026
