= David Seger =

Swedish footballer

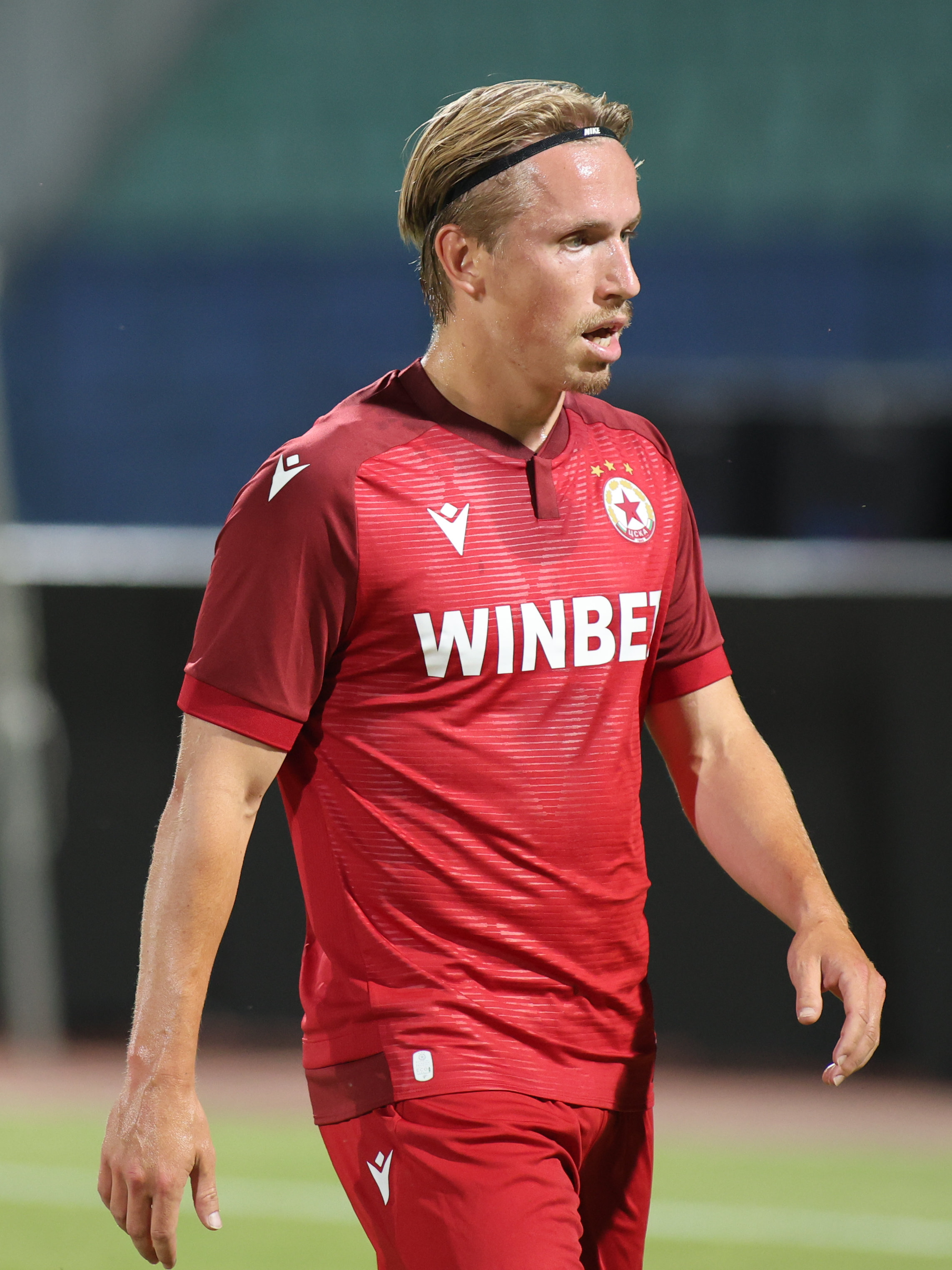
- Seger with CSKA Sofia in 2025

Personal information
- Full name: John David Theodor Seger
- Date of birth: 15 July 1999 (age 27)
- Place of birth: Norrtälje, Sweden
- Height: 1.75 m (5 ft 9 in)
- Position: Midfielder

Team information
- Current team: Häcken
- Number: 19

Youth career
- 2013-2014: IFK Stocksund
- 2015: Täby FK

Senior career*
Years	Team	Apps	(Gls)
2016	IFK Osby	19	(4)
2017	BKV Norrtälje	25	(4)
2018	IFK Stocksund	26	(5)
2019	Sollentuna FK	27	(9)
2020–2023	Örebro SK	111	(10)
2024–2025	Östers IF	40	(8)
2025–2026	CSKA Sofia	14	(0)
2026–	Häcken	2	(0)
- * Club domestic league appearances and goals as of 8 July 2026

John David Theodor Seger (born 15 July 1999) is a Swedish professional footballer who plays as a midfielder for Häcken.

== Career statistics ==
=== Club ===
As of match played 3 December 2025

Appearances and goals by club, season and competition
Club	Season	League			National Cup		Europe		Other		Total	
Club	Season	Division	Apps	Goals	Apps	Goals	Apps	Goals	Apps	Goals	Apps	Goals
BKV Norrtälje	2017	Swedish football division 2	25	4	3	0	—		—		28	4
BKV Norrtälje	2018	Swedish football division 2	0	0	1	0	—		—		1	0
BKV Norrtälje	Total		25	4	4	0	0	0	0	0	29	4
IFK Stocksund	2018	Swedish football division 2	26	5	0	0	—		—		26	5
Sollentuna FK	2019	Ettan	27	9	2	0	—		2	0	31	9
Örebro SK	2020	Allsvenskan	27	3	1	0	—		—		28	3
Örebro SK	2021	Allsvenskan	29	1	4	2	—		—		33	3
Örebro SK	2022	Superettan	26	2	3	0	—		—		29	2
Örebro SK	2023	Superettan	29	4	3	1	—		—		32	5
Örebro SK	Total		111	10	11	3	0	0	0	0	122	13
Östers IF	2024	Superettan	28	6	3	1	—		—		31	7
Östers IF	2025	Allsvenskan	12	2	4	0	—		—		16	2
Östers IF	Total		40	8	7	1	0	0	0	0	47	9
CSKA Sofia	2025–26	First League	14	0	1	0	—		—		15	0
Career total			243	34	25	4	0	0	2	0	270	40
