= James Eto'o =

Cameroonian football player

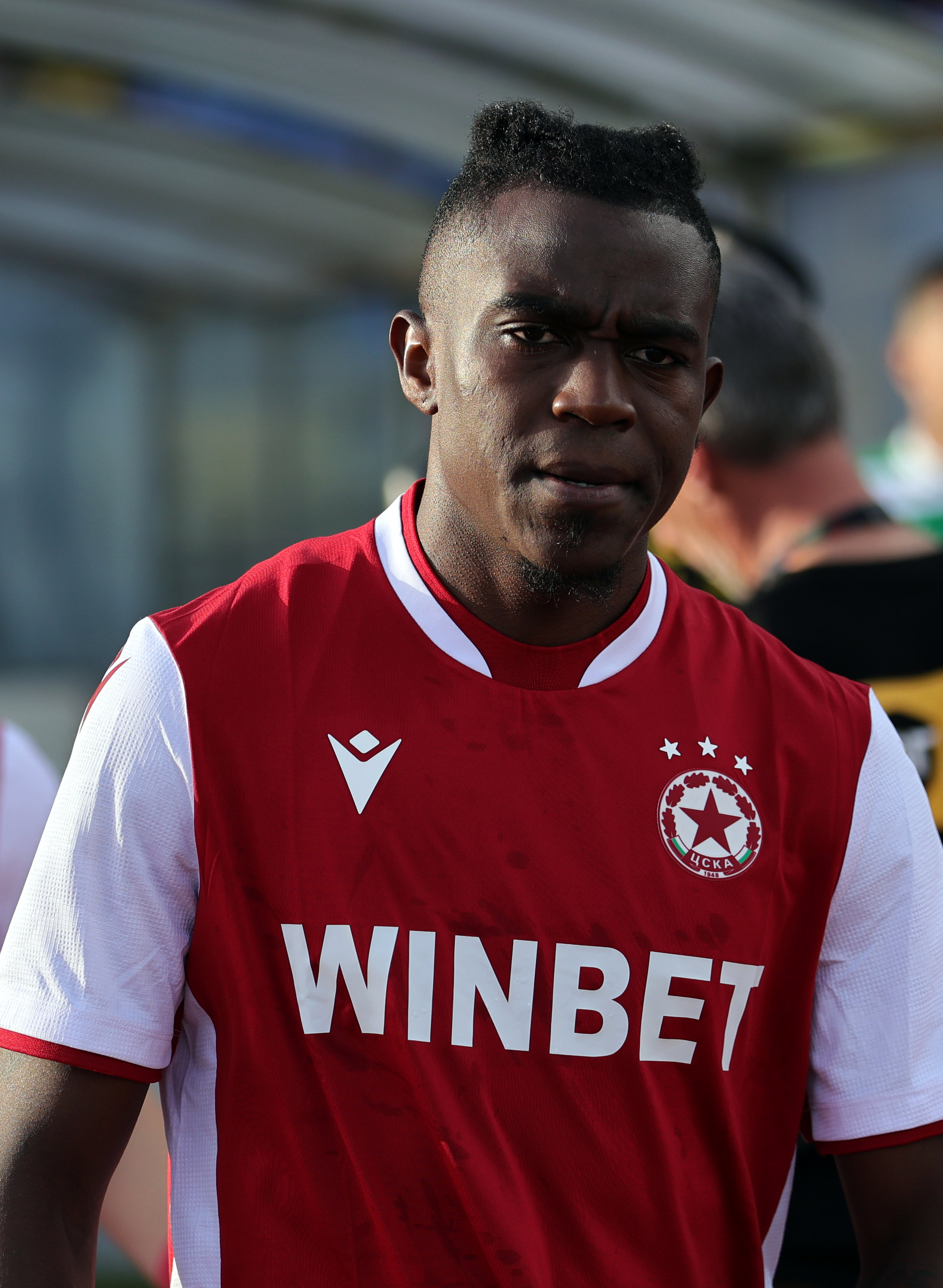

Personal information
- Full name: James Armel Eto'o Eyenga
- Date of birth: 19 November 2000 (age 26)
- Place of birth: Yaoundé, Cameroon
- Height: 1.88 m (6 ft 2 in)
- Position: Central midfielder

Team information
- Current team: CSKA Sofia
- Number: 99

Youth career
- Musango
- 2018–2019: Nantes

Senior career*
Years	Team	Apps	(Gls)
2019–2020	Nantes II	8	(0)
2020–2021	Boulogne	26	(0)
2021–2024	Botev Plovdiv	85	(2)
2024–	CSKA Sofia	67	(6)

International career^{‡}
2025–	Cameroon	1	(0)
- * Club domestic league appearances and goals as of 17:57, 22 November 2026 (UTC) ‡ National team caps and goals as of 00:32, 7 June 2025 (UTC)

James Armel Eto'o Eyenga (born 19 November 2000) is a Cameroonian professional footballer who plays as a midfielder for Bulgarian First League club CSKA Sofia and the Cameroon national team.

== Club career ==
On 23 September 2021, Eto'o signed with Bulgarian club Botev Plovdiv, coming from Boulogne. In April 2023, he extended his contract with the club.

== International career ==
In April 2022, Cameroonian mеdia reported that Eto'o is in the extended list of players for Cameroon national team for the 2022 FIFA World Cup. On 6 June 2025, he earned his first cap, appearing as a starter, but forced to withdraw after 16 minutes in the 3:0 win over Uganda in a friendly match.

== Career statistics ==
=== Club ===
As of 22 November 2026

Appearances and goals by club, season and competition
Club	Season	League			National cup		Europe		Other		Total	
Club	Season	Division	Apps	Goals	Apps	Goals	Apps	Goals	Apps	Goals	Apps	Goals
Nantes II	2019–20	Championnat National 2	8	0	–		–		–		8	0
Boulogne II	2020–21	Championnat National	1	0	–		–		–		1	0
Boulogne	2020–21	Championnat National	25	0	1	0	–		–		26	0
Boulogne	2021–22	Championnat National	1	0	0	0	–		–		1	0
Boulogne	Total		26	0	1	0	0	0	0	0	27	0
Botev Plovdiv II	2021–22	Second League	1	0	–		–		–		1	0
Botev Plovdiv II	2022–23	Second League	1	0	–		–		–		1	0
Botev Plovdiv II	Total		2	0	0	0	0	0	0	0	2	0
Botev Plovdiv	2021–22	First League	20	1	1	0	–		1	0	21	1
Botev Plovdiv	2022–23	First League	29	0	0	0	2	0	–		31	0
Botev Plovdiv	2023–24	First League	31	0	6	1	–		–		37	1
Botev Plovdiv	2024–25	First League	5	1	0	0	5	0	–		10	1
Botev Plovdiv	Total		85	2	7	1	7	0	1	0	100	3
CSKA Sofia	2024–25	First League	24	1	6	0	–		1	0	31	1
CSKA Sofia	2025–26	First League	31	4	6	0	–		–		37	4
CSKA Sofia	2026–27	First League	12	1	1	0	8	0	1	0	22	1
CSKA Sofia	Total		67	6	13	1	8	0	2	0	90	6
Career total			189	8	21	1	15	0	3	0	228	9

=== International ===
As of match played 6 June 2025

Appearances and goals by national team and year
National team	Year	Apps	Goals
Cameroon	2025	1	0
Total		1	0

== Honours ==
Botev Plovdiv

- Bulgarian Cup: 2023–24

CSKA Sofia

- Bulgarian Cup: 2025–26
- Bulgarian Supercup: 2026
