= Alejandro Piedrahita =

Colombian footballer

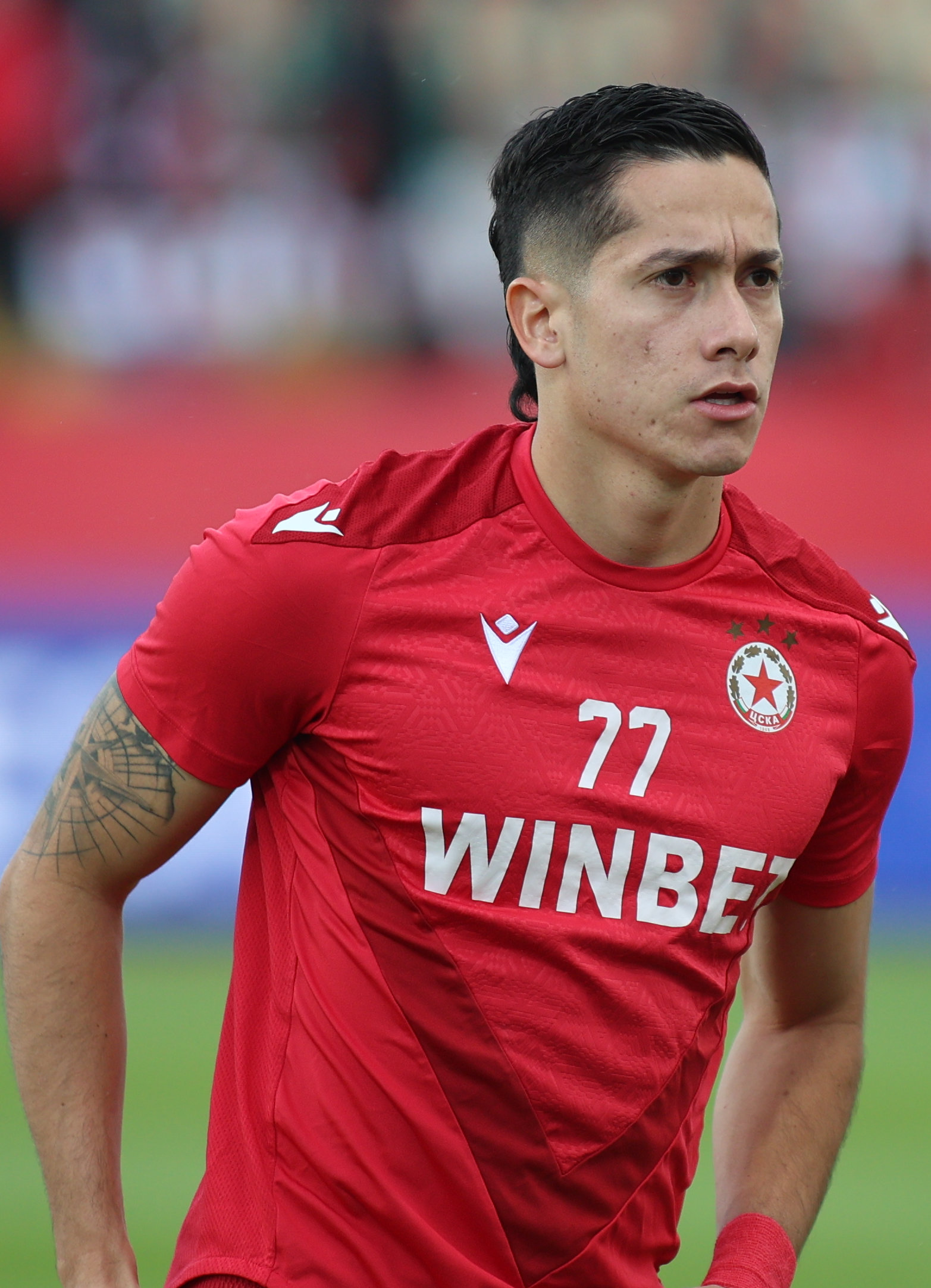
- Piedrahita with CSKA Sofia in 2026

Personal information
- Full name: Alejandro Piedrahita Díaz
- Date of birth: 3 September 2002 (age 24)
- Place of birth: Cartago, Colombia
- Height: 1.82 m (6 ft 0 in)
- Position: Winger

Team information
- Current team: Toronto FC (on loan from CSKA Sofia)
- Number: 27

Youth career
- –2014: Comfandi Cartago
- 2014–2019: El Diamante Sports Club

Senior career*
Years	Team	Apps	(Gls)
2020–2025	Deportivo Pereira	96	(10)
2023	→ Banfield (loan)	5	(0)
2025	→ Gimnasia LP (loan)	18	(0)
2026–	CSKA Sofia	18	(2)
2026–	→ Toronto FC (loan)	2	(0)
- * Club domestic league appearances and goals as of 03:39, 8 November 2026 (UTC)

Alejandro Piedrahita Díaz (born 3 September 2002) is a Colombian professional footballer who plays as a winger for Major League Soccer club Toronto FC, on loan from CSKA Sofia.

== Early life ==
Piedrahita was born in Cartago, Valle del Cauca. He played football at Comfandi Cartago until he was 12 when in 2014 he started playing at El Diamante Sports Club. He joined Deportivo Pereira in 2019.

== Club career ==
Piedrahita made his debut for Deportivo Pereira in the Categoría Primera A in 2020. He scored his first senior goal on 6 April 2021 in the league against Independiente Medellín. He played 22 times in 2022 as his club won the Colombian league title.

He joined Club Atlético Banfield in January 2023 on loan for a year with the option to join permanently for a transfer fee or $700,000 for 80% of his rights.

In February 2025, Piedrahita joined Gimnasia y Esgrima La Plata of the Argentine Primera División on loan for one year with an option to buy.

=== CSKA Sofia ===
In December 2025, Bulgarian club CSKA Sofia announced the signing of Piedrahita on a three-year contract; he was assigned shirt number 77. Reports in Bulgaria described the move as a free transfer following the expiration of his Deportivo Pereira contract.

=== Loan to Toronto FC ===
On 4 September 2026, Piedrahita was loaned to Major League Soccer club Toronto FC on a deal through the 2027 MLS season, with an additional option to make the move permanent.

== International career ==
Piedrahita was selected to train with the Colombia national under-20 football team in May 2021.

== Style of play ==
Primarily deployed as a winger, Piedrahita has been described as an attacker capable of playing on either flank, noted for pace and one-on-one ability.

== Career statistics ==
=== Club ===
As of match played 7 November 2026

Appearances and goals by club, season and competition
Club	Season	League			National cup (Note: Includes Copa Colombia, Copa Argentina, Bulgarian Cup)		Continental		Other		Total	
Club	Season	Division	Apps	Goals	Apps	Goals	Apps	Goals	Apps	Goals	Apps	Goals
Deportivo Pereira	2020	Categoría Primera A	10	0	2	0	—		—		12	0
Deportivo Pereira	2021	Categoría Primera A	19	2	4	0	—		—		23	2
Deportivo Pereira	2022	Categoría Primera A	20	1	3	0	—		—		23	1
Deportivo Pereira	2023	Categoría Primera A	12	1	2	0	—		—		14	1
Deportivo Pereira	2024	Categoría Primera A	35	6	5	0	—		—		40	6
Deportivo Pereira	Total		96	10	16	0	0	0	0	0	112	10
Banfield (loan)	2023	Argentine Primera División	5	0	1	0	—		—		6	0
Gimnasia LP (loan)	2025	Argentine Primera División	18	0	1	0	—		—		19	0
CSKA Sofia	2025–26	Bulgarian First League	16	2	2	0	—		—		18	2
CSKA Sofia	2026–27	Bulgarian First League	2	0	—		1 (Note: Appearance in UEFA Europa League)	0	—		3	0
CSKA Sofia	Total		18	2	2	0	1	0	0	0	21	2
Toronto FC (loan)	2026	Major League Soccer	2	0	—		—		—		2	0
Career total			139	12	20	0	1	0	0	0	160	12

== Honours ==
=== Club ===
Deportivo Pereira

- Categoría Primera A: 2022 Finalización
- Copa Colombia: 2021 Runner-up

CSKA Sofia

- Bulgarian Cup: 2025–26
