= Bruno Jordão =

Portuguese footballer (born 1998)

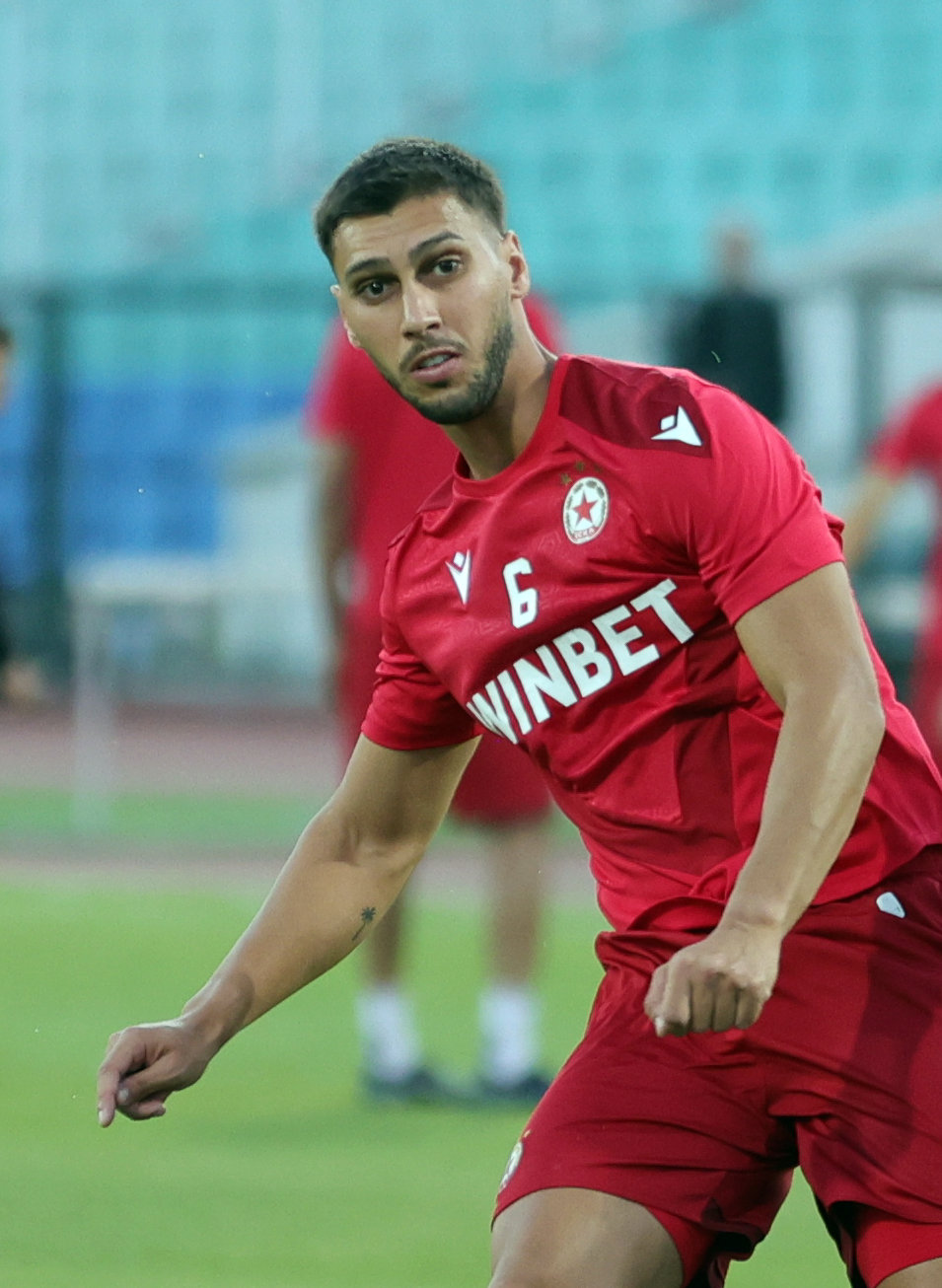

Personal information
- Full name: Bruno André Cavaco Jordão
- Date of birth: 12 October 1998 (age 28)
- Place of birth: Marinha Grande, Portugal
- Height: 1.80 m (5 ft 11 in)
- Position: Midfielder

Team information
- Current team: CSKA Sofia
- Number: 6

Youth career
- 2006–2009: Garcia
- 2009–2010: Marinhense
- 2010–2016: União Leiria

Senior career*
Years	Team	Apps	(Gls)
2015–2016	União Leiria	23	(4)
2016–2019	Braga B	19	(2)
2016–2019	Braga	0	(0)
2017–2019	→ Lazio (loan)	3	(0)
2019–2024	Wolverhampton Wanderers	1	(0)
2020–2021	→ Famalicão (loan)	9	(1)
2022	→ Grasshopper (loan)	12	(0)
2022–2023	→ Santa Clara (loan)	11	(1)
2024–2025	Radomiak Radom	48	(0)
2025–	CSKA Sofia	39	(4)

International career
2015–2016	Portugal U18	7	(1)
2017	Portugal U19	7	(1)
2017–2018	Portugal U20	6	(1)
2018	Portugal U21	1	(0)
- * Club domestic league appearances and goals as of 17:44, 22 November 2026 (UTC)

Bruno André Cavaco Jordão (born 12 October 1998) is a Portuguese professional footballer who plays as a midfielder for Bulgarian First League club CSKA Sofia.

== Club career ==
=== Early career ===
Born in Marinha Grande, Leiria District, Jordão began his career at U.D. Leiria. He became their youngest player and goalscorer of all time in the 2015–16 Campeonato de Portugal, and in July 2016, he transferred to S.C. Braga.

On 20 August 2016, Jordão made his professional debut with Braga B in a 2016–17 LigaPro match against Cova da Piedade. He was substituted for Xadas at halftime in the 1–0 home loss.

Both Jordão and teammate Pedro Neto were loaned to S.S. Lazio from Italy for two years on 31 August 2017, with an obligation to subsequently buy for a combined €26 million. He played only three matches for the Serie A club, starting with a 2–1 away loss to Genoa C.F.C. on 17 February 2019 when he played the final 18 minutes in place of Ștefan Radu.

=== Wolverhampton Wanderers ===
On 2 August 2019, Jordão signed to Premier League club Wolverhampton Wanderers. He made his debut for Wolves in an EFL Cup third round tie against Reading on 25 September, in which he was withdrawn with injury shortly after scoring. Jordão made his debut in UEFA club competition football in Wolves' 2019-20 UEFA Europa League Round of 32 second leg away to RCD Espanyol on 27 February 2020. In the final Premier League matchday of the season, he made his league debut as a substitute away at Chelsea.

Jordão agreed a season-long loan move back to his homeland with F.C. Famalicão on 8 September 2020. He scored his first top-flight goal on 18 October with a run from his own half in a 3–3 draw at S.C. Farense. He lost his place in the second half of the season, but his loan was not cut short.

On 9 January 2022, Jordão made his first appearance for Wolves since 26 July 2020, when he came on as a late substitute in a 3–0 victory over Sheffield United at Molineux in the third round of the 2021–22 FA Cup.

Jordão joined Swiss Super League side Grasshopper Club Zürich on loan for the remainder of the 2021–22 season on 31 January 2022. On 23 August that year, he was loaned back to his country's top flight at C.D. Santa Clara. Before making an appearance, he suffered an undisclosed injury that would require surgery in England, ruling him out until 2023.

Jordão left Wolverhampton by mutual consent on 6 February 2024.

=== Radomiak Radom ===
On 8 February 2024, Jordão signed a two-and-a-half-year contract with Polish Ekstraklasa club Radomiak Radom. He made his debut eight days later in a 0–4 home loss to Pogoń Szczecin, playing the full 90 minutes.

=== CSKA Sofia ===
On 15 August 2025, Jordão moved to Bulgarian First League side CSKA Sofia on a three-year deal, for a fee of €500,000.

== International career ==
Jordão had his first call-up to the Portugal under-21 team in May 2018, ahead of a friendly against Italy in Estoril. He came on at half-time for Stephen Eustáquio in the 3–2 win on 25 May.

== Career statistics ==
As of match played 22 November 2026

Appearances and goals by club, season and competition
Club	Season	League			National cup (Note: Includes FA Cup, Taça de Portugal, Polish Cup)		League cup (Note: Includes EFL Cup)		Europe		Other		Total	
Club	Season	Division	Apps	Goals	Apps	Goals	Apps	Goals	Apps	Goals	Apps	Goals	Apps	Goals
União Leiria	2015–16	CdP	23	4	—		—		—		—		23	4
Braga B	2016–17	Liga Portugal 2	19	2	—		—		—		—		19	2
Lazio (loan)	2018–19	Serie A	3	0	0	0	—		0	0	—		3	0
Wolverhampton Wanderers	2019–20	Premier League	1	0	0	0	2	1	1 (Note: Appearance in UEFA Europa League)	0	—		4	1
Wolverhampton Wanderers	2020–21	Premier League	0	0	0	0	0	0	—		—		0	0
Wolverhampton Wanderers	2021–22	Premier League	0	0	1	0	0	0	—		—		1	0
Wolverhampton Wanderers	Total		1	0	1	0	2	1	1	0	0	0	5	1
Famalicão (loan)	2020–21	Primeira Liga	9	1	2	0	0	0	—		—		11	1
Grasshopper (loan)	2021–22	Swiss Super League	12	0	—		—		—		—		12	0
Santa Clara (loan)	2022–23	Primeira Liga	11	0	—		—		—		—		11	0
Radomiak Radom	2023–24	Ekstraklasa	13	0	—		—		—		—		13	0
Radomiak Radom	2024–25	Ekstraklasa	31	0	2	0	—		—		—		33	0
Radomiak Radom	2025–26	Ekstraklasa	4	0	0	0	—		—		—		4	0
Radomiak Radom	Total		48	0	2	0	0	0	0	0	0	0	50	0
CSKA Sofia	2025–26	First League	25	2	5	1	—		—		—		30	3
CSKA Sofia	2026–27	First League	14	2	1	0	—		10	1	1	0	25	3
CSKA Sofia	Total		39	4	6	1	0	0	10	1	1	0	55	6
Career total			164	11	11	1	2	1	11	1	1	0	189	14

== Honours ==
Individual

- Primeira Liga Goal of the Month: September/October 2020

CSKA Sofia

- Bulgarian Cup: 2025–26
- Bulgarian Supercup: 2026
