= Santiago Godoy =

Argentine professional footballer

Leandro Godoy
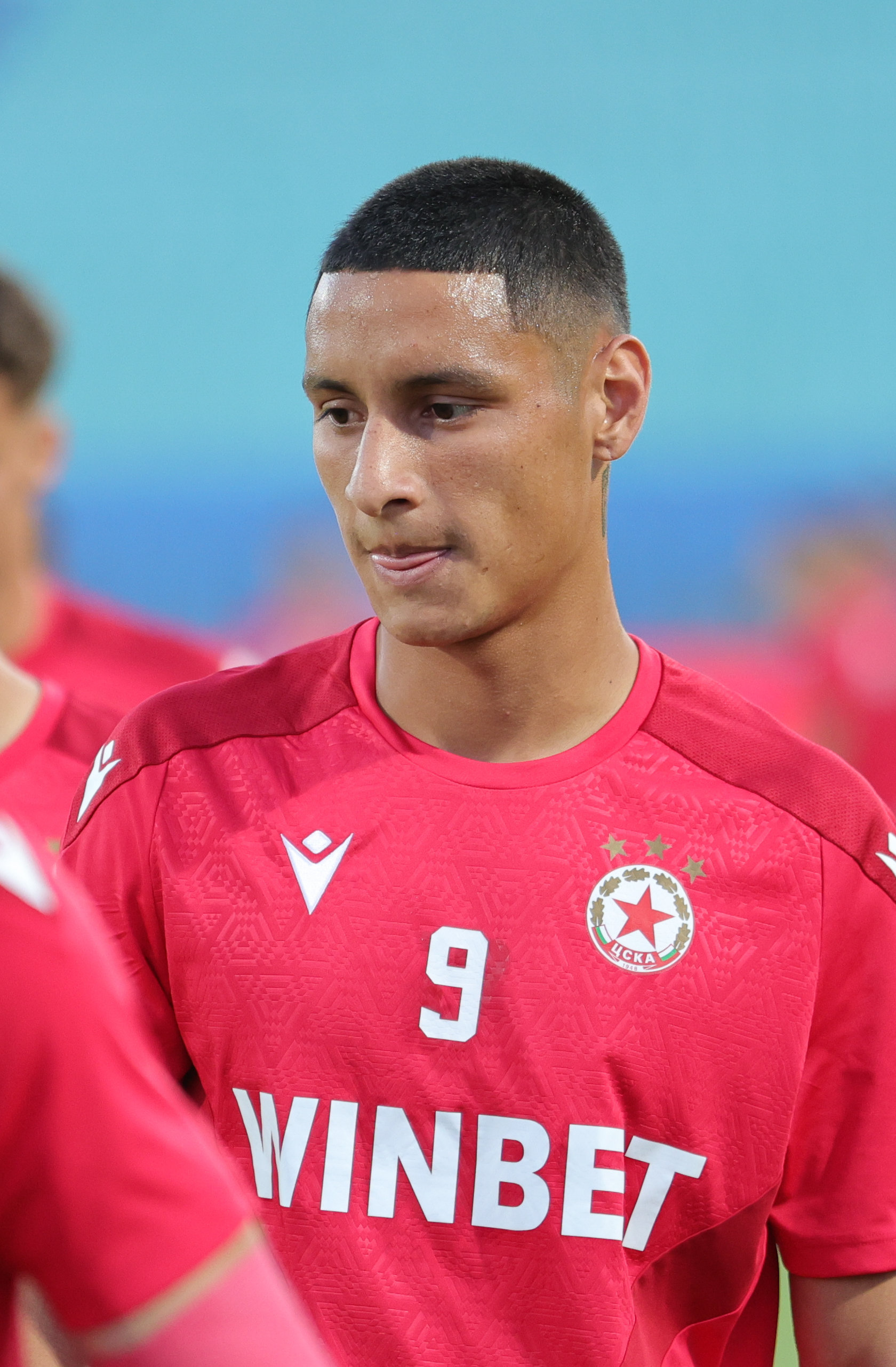

Personal information
- Full name: Santiago Leandro Godoy
- Date of birth: 4 February 2001 (age 25)
- Place of birth: Avellaneda, Argentina
- Height: 1.85 m (6 ft 1 in)
- Position: Forward

Team information
- Current team: CSKA Sofia
- Number: 9

Youth career
- –2015: Boca Juniors
- 2015–2018: Berazategui
- 2018–2020: Racing Club

Senior career*
Years	Team	Apps	(Gls)
2020–2023	Racing Club	4	(0)
2022	→ Chacarita Juniors (loan)	29	(11)
2023	→ Torreense (loan)	15	(4)
2023–2025	Beroe	42	(21)
2024	→ Defensa y Justicia (loan)	10	(0)
2025–	CSKA Sofia	41	(18)
- * Club domestic league appearances and goals as of 17:59, 22 November 2026 (UTC)

Santiago Leandro Godoy (born 4 February 2001) is an Argentine professional footballer who plays as a forward for Bulgarian First League club CSKA Sofia.

== Career ==
=== Early career and Racing Club ===
Godoy started out with Boca Juniors, before heading to Berazategui in 2015. In 2018, Racing Club signed Godoy; he scored thirty-two goals in a season with Berazategui's academy.

Towards the back end of 2020, Godoy moved into first-team football under manager Sebastián Beccacece. His senior debut arrived on 1 November at home in the Copa de la Liga Profesional against Atlético Tucumán; he was subbed on at half-time of an eventual 4–1 defeat.

=== Loans: Chacarita Juniors and Torreense ===
On 6 January 2022, Godoy joined Primera Nacional side Chacarita Juniors on a season-long loan from Racing Club, running until December 2022. He finished the 2022 Primera Nacional campaign with 11 goals in 29 league appearances, placing among the division's leading scorers.

During the season he recorded multiple braces, including in a 3–1 away win over Almagro on 2 April 2022. He also scored twice in a 3–1 home win over Atlético Rafaela on 22 July 2022.

In January 2023, Godoy moved to Portuguese second-tier club Torreense on loan from Racing for the second half of the 2022–23 season. He made 15 Liga Portugal 2 appearances and scored four goals during his spell.

Godoy scored his first goal for the club in a 4–2 win over Feirense on 23 January 2023, striking from outside the area in the 76th minute. On 8 April 2023, he scored in stoppage time (90+2) to seal a 3–1 home win over S.C. Covilhã.

=== Beroe ===
In July 2023, Godoy joined Bulgarian First League side Beroe. Reports in Bulgarian media noted that his registration was delayed due to documentation issues, with his competitive debut coming later in the summer of 2023.

During his first spell at the club in the first half of the 2023–24 season, Godoy made 10 league appearances and scored three times; he also added two goals in two Bulgarian Cup matches. In January 2024, he left on loan to Argentine side Defensa y Justicia, before returning to Beroe in July 2024 following the end of the loan.

In the 2024–25 season, Godoy scored 18 league goals in 29 appearances and finished as the league's top goalscorer. On 4 December 2024, he scored four goals (including a penalty) in a 5–1 league win over Botev Vratsa. He later recorded a hat-trick on 1 March 2025 in a 3–0 away victory against Spartak Varna.

Godoy left Beroe having scored 23 goals in 47 matches across all competitions.

=== CSKA Sofia ===
On 7 August 2025, Godoy signed for Bulgarian First League club CSKA Sofia from Beroe, taking the squad number 9. Bulgarian media reported the transfer fee at around €1.5 million, with a sell-on clause reported at around 20%, while other reports put the fee at €1.8 million.

On 8 August 2025, it was reported that he had signed a three-year contract with CSKA, running until 2028.

In the 2025–26 season, Godoy scored 10 league goals in 15 appearances as of 6 December 2025. He produced several decisive performances in late 2025, including braces against Montana (3–1; two penalties), Botev Plovdiv (2–1), Spartak Varna (4–0), and Lokomotiv Plovdiv (2–1; including a stoppage-time winning penalty).

== Career statistics ==
As of match played 22 November 2026

Appearances and goals by club, season and competition
Club	Season	League			National cup (Note: Includes Copa Argentina, Bulgarian Cup)		Continental		Other		Total	
Club	Season	Division	Apps	Goals	Apps	Goals	Apps	Goals	Apps	Goals	Apps	Goals
Racing Club	2019–20 (Note: Soccerway counts Copa de la Liga Profesional appearances as league appearances.)	Argentine Primera División	4	0	0	0	1 (Note: Appearance(s) in Copa Libertadores)	0	–		5	0
Racing Club	2020–21	Argentine Primera División	0	0	0	0	4	0	–		4	0
Racing Club	Total		4	0	0	0	5	0	–		9	0
Chacarita Juniors (loan)	2022	Primera Nacional	29	11	0	0	–		–		29	11
Torreense (loan)	2022–23	Liga Portugal 2	15	4	–		–		–		15	4
Beroe Stara Zagora	2023–24	Bulgarian First League	10	3	2	2	–		–		12	5
Beroe Stara Zagora	2024–25	Bulgarian First League	29	18	3	0	–		–		32	18
Beroe Stara Zagora	2025–26	Bulgarian First League	3	0	–		–		–		3	0
Beroe Stara Zagora	Total		42	21	5	2	–		–		47	23
Defensa y Justicia (loan)	2024	Argentine Primera División	10	0	0	0	3 (Note: Appearances in Copa Sudamericana)	0	1	0	14	0
CSKA Sofia	2025–26	Bulgarian First League	28	13	6	2	–		–		34	15
CSKA Sofia	2026–27	Bulgarian First League	13	5	1	0	11	3	1	0	26	8
CSKA Sofia	Total		41	18	7	2	11	3	1	0	60	23
Career total			141	54	12	4	19	3	2	0	174	61

== Honours ==
CSKA Sofia

- Bulgarian Cup: 2025–26
- Bulgarian Supercup: 2026

Individual

- Bulgarian First League top goalscorer: 2024–25 (18 goals)
