= Bertrand Fourrier =

Cameroonian professional football player (born 1997)

Personal information
- Full name: Bertrand Max Frederic Fourrier
- Date of birth: 5 August 1997 (age 29)
- Place of birth: Douala, Cameroon
- Height: 1.88 m (6 ft 2 in)
- Position: Forward

Team information
- Current team: Ural Yekaterinburg
- Number: 99

Youth career
- –2014: Marseille
- 2014–2015: Nice

Senior career*
Years	Team	Apps	(Gls)
2016–2017	Carapinheirense		
2017–2020	Martigues	26	(5)
2020–2021	Aubagne	8	(2)
2021–2022	Le Puy	21	(4)
2022–2023	Moulins Yzeure	14	(3)
2023–2024	Toulon	39	(6)
2024–2026	Septemvri Sofia	65	(19)
2026–	Ural Yekaterinburg	0	(0)
- * Club domestic league appearances and goals as of 26 July 2026

Bertrand Max Frederic Fourrier (born 5 August 1997) is a Cameroonian professional footballer who plays as a forward for Russian club Ural Yekaterinburg.

== Career ==
Bertrand began his youth career at Marseille, later moving to Nice and Carapinheirense. In June 2017 he moved to Martigues. He spend a season with Le Puy in National 2 league, scoring 5 goals in total and leaving in August 2022. In January 2023 he moved to Toulon.

Fourrier made a huge jump from amateur football to Bulgarian First League, signing with the newly returned team of Septemvri Sofia on 3 August 2024. he scored his first league goal in October 2024. During the winter camp in Turkey, he got malaria, which made him miss big part of the camp. In November, he had 8 goals in 10 matches, which led to interest from Levski Sofia, but the Septemvri owner said in interview, that the team couldn't afford the price and that there is interest from foreign clubs. On 10 November 2025 he scored his 14th goal in the league for Septemvri, moving him to the second place of all-time top league goalscorrers.

On 27 July 2026, Fourrier moved to Ural Yekaterinburg of the Russian First League.

== Career statistics ==
As of match played 7 November 2025

Appearances and goals by club, season and competition
Club	Season	League			Bulgarian Cup		Total	
Club	Season	Division	Apps	Goals	Apps	Goals	Apps	Goals
Septemvri Sofia	2024–25	Bulgarian First League	29	6	1	0	30	6
Septemvri Sofia	2025–26	Bulgarian First League	14	9	1	1	15	10
Career total			43	15	2	1	45	16
