= Andrey Yordanov =

Bulgarian association football player

Personal information
- Full name: Andrey Yordanov Yordanov
- Date of birth: 6 September 2001 (age 25)
- Place of birth: Kyustendil, Bulgaria
- Height: 1.82 m (6 ft 0 in)
- Position: Left-back

Team information
- Current team: CSKA Sofia
- Number: 19

Youth career
- Buzludzha Kyustendil
- –2013: Velbazhd Kyustendil
- 2013–2020: CSKA Sofia

Senior career*
| Years | Team | Apps | (Gls) |
| 2019–2020 | CSKA Sofia | 1 | (0) |
| 2020 | → Litex Lovech (loan) | 1 | (0) |
| 2021 | Kyustendil | 12 | (5) |
| 2021–2022 | CSKA 1948 | 0 | (0) |
| 2021–2022 | CSKA 1948 II | 14 | (0) |
| 2022 | Tsarsko Selo Sofia | 7 | (1) |
| 2022–2023 | Pirin Blagoevgrad | 27 | (1) |
| 2023 | Krumovgrad | 3 | (0) |
| 2023–2024 | Pirin Blagoevgrad | 25 | (2) |
| 2024–2025 | Botev Plovdiv II | 2 | (0) |
| 2024–2026 | Botev Plovdiv | 36 | (1) |
| 2026– | CSKA Sofia | 19 | (0) |

International career^{‡}
| 2017 | Bulgaria U16 | 3 | (0) |
| 2017 | Bulgaria U17 | 3 | (0) |
| 2024– | Bulgaria | 0 | (0) |
- * Club domestic league appearances and goals as of 18:00, 22 November 2026 (UTC) ‡ National team caps and goals as of 09:26, 10 July 2024 (UTC)

Andrey Yordanov (Bulgarian: Андрей Йорданов; born 6 September 2001) is a Bulgarian professional footballer who plays as a defender for CSKA Sofia.

== Career ==
Yordanov started his youth career in local Buzludzha Kyustendil and Velbazhd Kyustendil, before joining CSKA Sofia in 2013. He made his professional debut for the team on 2 March 2019 in a league match against Septemvri Sofia. In 2021 Yordanov moved to Pirin Blagoevgrad and spent a season for the team. In the summer of 2023, he moved to Krumovgrad, but after just 3 games he decided to return to Pirin.

== International career ==
On 17 March 2024 Yordanov received his first call-up for Bulgaria for the 2024 FIFA Series tournament.

== Career statistics ==
=== Club ===
As of 22 November 2026

| Club | Season | Division | League | | Cup | | Europe | | Other | | Total | |
| Club | Season | Division | Apps | Goals | Apps | Goals | Apps | Goals | Apps | Goals | Apps | Goals |
|---|---|---|---|---|---|---|---|---|---|---|---|---|
| CSKA Sofia | 2018–19 | First League | 1 | 0 | 0 | 0 | 0 | 0 | – | | 1 | 0 |
| Litex Lovech (loan) | 2020–21 | Second League | 1 | 0 | – | | – | | – | | 1 | 0 |
| Kyustendil | 2021–22 | Third League | 12 | 5 | – | | – | | – | | 12 | 5 |
| CSKA 1948 | 2021–22 | First League | 0 | 0 | 0 | 0 | – | | – | | 0 | 0 |
| CSKA 1948 II | 2021–22 | Second League | 13 | 0 | – | | – | | – | | 13 | 0 |
| Tsarsko Selo Sofia | 2021–22 | First League | 7 | 1 | – | | – | | – | | 7 | 1 |
| Pirin Blagoevgrad | 2022–23 | First League | 27 | 1 | 1 | 0 | – | | – | | 28 | 1 |
| Krumovgrad | 2023–24 | First League | 3 | 0 | 0 | 0 | – | | – | | 3 | 0 |
| Pirin Blagoevgrad | 2023–24 | First League | 25 | 2 | 3 | 0 | – | | – | | 28 | 2 |
| Botev Plovdiv | 2024–25 | First League | 19 | 1 | 2 | 0 | 2 | 0 | – | | 23 | 1 |
| Botev Plovdiv | 2025–26 | First League | 17 | 0 | 1 | 0 | – | | – | | 18 | 0 |
| Botev Plovdiv | Total | | 36 | 1 | 3 | 0 | 2 | 0 | 0 | 0 | 41 | 1 |
| Botev Plovdiv II | 2024–25 | Second League | 3 | 0 | – | | – | | – | | 3 | 0 |
| CSKA Sofia | 2025–26 | First League | 9 | 0 | 1 | 0 | – | | – | | 10 | 0 |
| CSKA Sofia | 2026–27 | First League | 10 | 0 | 1 | 0 | 4 | 0 | 1 | 0 | 16 | 0 |
| CSKA Sofia | Total | | 19 | 0 | 2 | 0 | 4 | 0 | 1 | 0 | 26 | 0 |
| Career total | | | 147 | 10 | 9 | 0 | 6 | 0 | 1 | 0 | 162 | 10 |

== Honours ==
CSKA Sofia

- Bulgarian Cup: 2025–26
- Bulgarian Supercup: 2026
