= Adrián Lapeña =

Spanish footballer

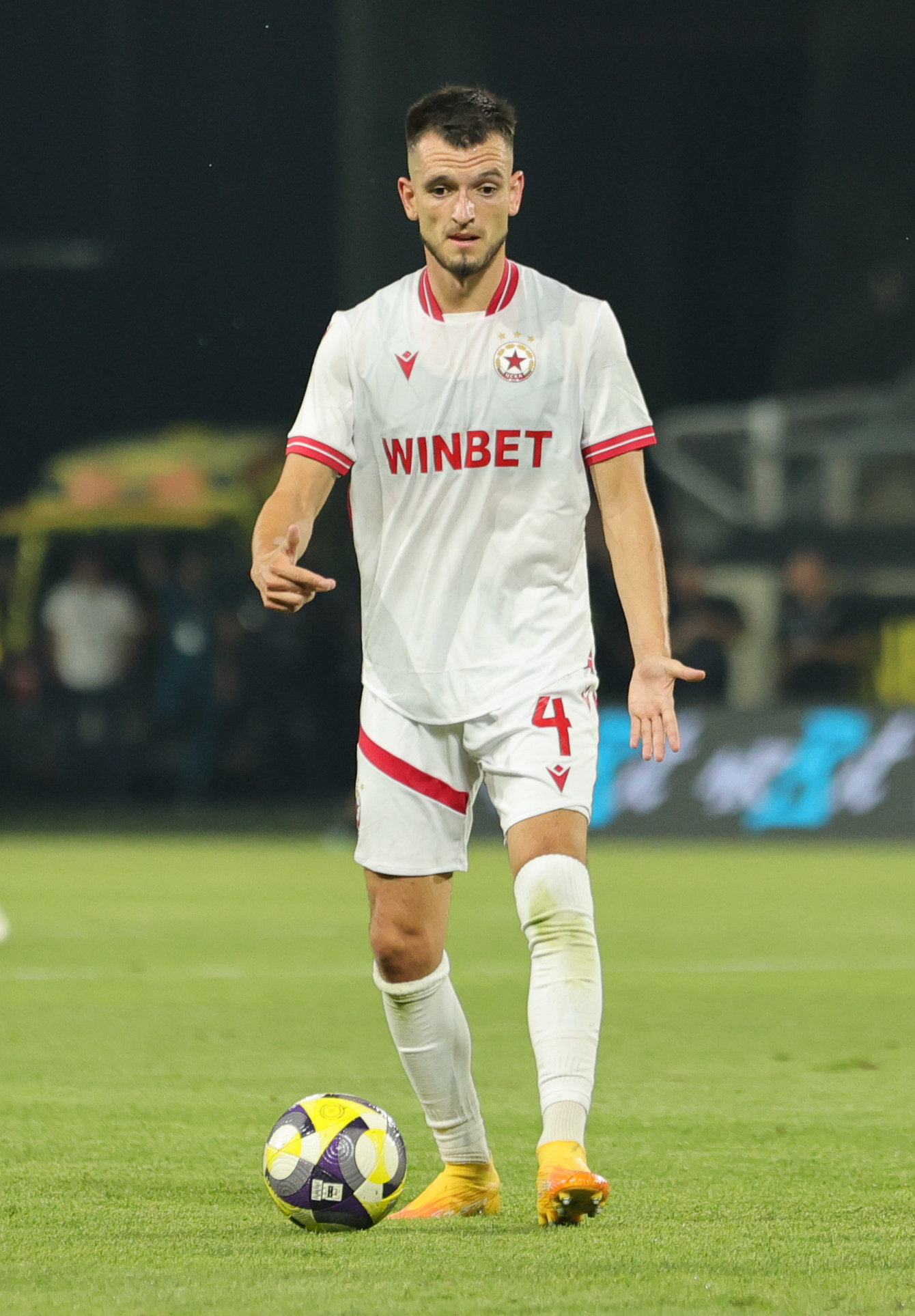

Personal information
- Full name: Adrián Lapeña Ruiz
- Date of birth: 16 April 1996 (age 30)
- Place of birth: Logroño, Spain
- Height: 1.82 m (6 ft 0 in)
- Position: Centre back

Team information
- Current team: Ceuta
- Number: 5

Youth career
- –2014: Real Sociedad

Senior career*
| Years | Team | Apps | (Gls) |
| 2014–2015 | Berio | 32 | (0) |
| 2015–2019 | Real Sociedad B | 108 | (6) |
| 2019–2020 | Eupen | 2 | (0) |
| 2020–2021 | Castellón | 35 | (3) |
| 2021–2023 | Deportivo La Coruña | 61 | (5) |
| 2023–2025 | Córdoba | 49 | (3) |
| 2025–2026 | CSKA Sofia | 41 | (1) |
| 2026– | Ceuta | 2 | (0) |
- * Club domestic league appearances and goals as of 10:05, 1 September 2026 (UTC)

Adrián Lapeña Ruiz (born 16 April 1996) is a Spanish professional footballer who plays as a central defender for Ceuta.

== Career ==
A Real Sociedad youth graduate, Lapeña played for farm team Berio FT and the reserves before moving abroad to Belgian side KAS Eupen on 23 July 2019. He made his professional debut five days later, starting in a 4–1 Belgian Pro League home loss to Royal Antwerp FC.

Rarely used afterwards, Lapeña returned to Spain on 29 January 2020, signing for Segunda División B side CD Castellón. A backup as the club achieved promotion to Segunda División, he became a regular starter afterwards, and scored his first professional goal on 11 October, netting the equalizer in a 1–1 away draw against CF Fuenlabrada.

On 25 June 2021, Lapeña agreed to a two-year contract with Primera División RFEF side Deportivo de La Coruña. On 2 July 2023, he moved to fellow league team Córdoba CF on a one-year deal, with an option for another season.

On 1 February 2025, after establishing himself as an undisputed starter, Lapeña was announced at Bulgarian side PFC CSKA Sofia. On 18 August 2026, he returned to Spain and its second division, after signing a two-year contract with AD Ceuta FC.

== Career statistics ==
As of 25 May 2026

Appearances and goals by club, season and competition
| Club | Season | League | | | Cup | | Europe | | Other | | Total | |
| Club | Season | Division | Apps | Goals | Apps | Goals | Apps | Goals | Apps | Goals | Apps | Goals |
|---|---|---|---|---|---|---|---|---|---|---|---|---|
| Berio | 2014–15 | Tercera División | 32 | 0 | – | | – | | – | | 32 | 0 |
| Real Sociedad B | 2015–16 | Segunda División B | 19 | 1 | – | | – | | – | | 19 | 1 |
| Real Sociedad B | 2016–17 | Segunda División B | 29 | 0 | – | | – | | – | | 29 | 0 |
| Real Sociedad B | 2017–18 | Segunda División B | 28 | 2 | – | | – | | 2 | 0 | 30 | 2 |
| Real Sociedad B | 2018–19 | Segunda División B | 32 | 3 | – | | – | | – | | 32 | 3 |
| Real Sociedad B | Total | | 108 | 6 | 0 | 0 | 0 | 0 | 2 | 0 | 110 | 6 |
| Eupen | 2019–20 | Belgian First Division A | 2 | 0 | 0 | 0 | – | | – | | 2 | 0 |
| Castellón | 2019–20 | Segunda División B | 4 | 1 | 0 | 0 | – | | 3 | 1 | 7 | 2 |
| Castellón | 2020–21 | Segunda División B | 31 | 2 | 2 | 0 | – | | – | | 33 | 2 |
| Castellón | Total | | 35 | 3 | 2 | 0 | 0 | 0 | 3 | 1 | 40 | 4 |
| Deportivo La Coruña | 2021–22 | Primera Federación | 35 | 4 | 1 | 0 | – | | 2 | 0 | 38 | 4 |
| Deportivo La Coruña | 2022–23 | Primera Federación | 26 | 1 | 0 | 0 | – | | 0 | 0 | 26 | 1 |
| Deportivo La Coruña | Total | | 61 | 5 | 1 | 0 | 0 | 0 | 2 | 1 | 64 | 6 |
| Córdoba | 2023–24 | Primera Federación | 32 | 2 | 0 | 0 | – | | 4 | 0 | 36 | 2 |
| Córdoba | 2024–25 | Segunda División | 17 | 1 | 0 | 0 | – | | – | | 17 | 1 |
| Córdoba | Total | | 49 | 3 | 0 | 0 | 0 | 0 | 4 | 0 | 53 | 3 |
| CSKA Sofia | 2024–25 | Bulgarian First League | 16 | 0 | 4 | 0 | – | | 1 | 0 | 21 | 0 |
| CSKA Sofia | 2025–26 | Bulgarian First League | 25 | 1 | 3 | 0 | – | | – | | 28 | 1 |
| CSKA Sofia | Total | | 41 | 1 | 7 | 0 | 0 | 0 | 1 | 0 | 49 | 1 |
| Career total | | | 328 | 18 | 10 | 0 | 0 | 0 | 12 | 2 | 350 | 20 |

== Honours ==
CSKA Sofia

- Bulgarian Cup: 2025–26
