= Mohamed Brahimi (footballer, born 1998) =

French footballer (born 1998)

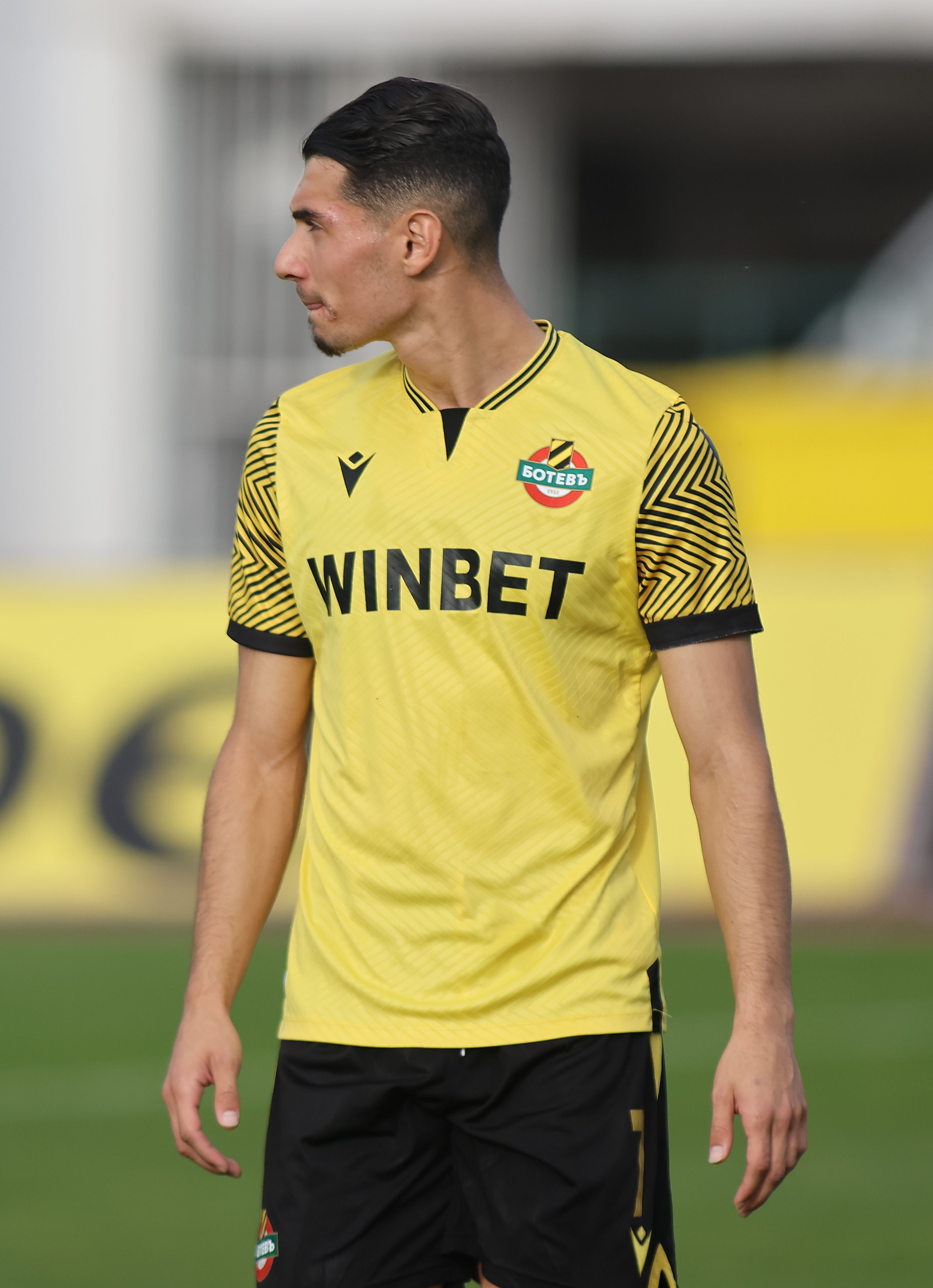
- Brahimi with Botev in 2022

Personal information
- Full name: Mohammed Amine Brahimi
- Date of birth: 17 September 1998 (age 28)
- Place of birth: Saint-Étienne, France
- Height: 1.81 m (5 ft 11 in)
- Position: Winger

Team information
- Current team: CSKA Sofia
- Number: 11

Youth career
- –2017: Saint-Priest

Senior career*
Years	Team	Apps	(Gls)
2017–2018	Hauts Lyonnais	25	(7)
2018–2020	Vaulx-en-Velin	13	(2)
2020–2021	Tsarsko Selo Sofia	3	(0)
2021	Neftochimic Burgas	8	(5)
2021–2022	Pirin Blagoevgrad	17	(4)
2022–2024	Botev Plovdiv	37	(1)
2023	→ Fakel Voronezh (loan)	13	(0)
2024–2025	Fakel Voronezh	29	(1)
2025–	CSKA Sofia	34	(4)
2025–	CSKA Sofia II	2	(0)
- * Club domestic league appearances and goals as of 19:10, 31 October 2026 (UTC)

Mohamed Amine Brahimi (Arabic: محمد أمين براهيمي; born 17 September 1998) is a French professional footballer who plays as a winger for Bulgarian First League club CSKA Sofia.

== Career ==
Brahimi started his career in Vaulx-en-Velin, before moving to Bulgaria and joining Tsarsko Selo Sofia in 2020. He moved to Second League team Neftochimic Burgas in March 2021 and had a crucial impact in their late retain in the league. His good play lead him to return in the top level football, signing a contract with the newly promoted team Pirin Blagoevgrad in June 2021.

On 12 January 2022, Brahimi moved to Botev Plovdiv for undisclosed transfer fee.

On 3 February 2023, Brahimi joined Fakel Voronezh in the Russian Premier League on loan. On 18 June 2024, Brahimi returned to Fakel on a permanent basis.

== Career statistics ==
As of match played 9 November 2026

Appearances and goals by club, season and competition
Club	Season	League			National cup		Europe		Other		Total	
Club	Season	Division	Apps	Goals	Apps	Goals	Apps	Goals	Apps	Goals	Apps	Goals
Hauts Lyonnais	2017–18	Régional 1	25	7	1	0	—		—		26	7
Vaulx-en-Velin	2018–19	Championnat National 3	13	2	0	0	—		—		13	2
Vaulx-en-Velin	2019–20	Championnat National 3	0	0	0	0	—		—		0	0
Vaulx-en-Velin	Total		13	2	0	0	—		—		13	2
Tsarsko Selo Sofia	2020–21	Bulgarian First League	3	0	—		—		—		3	0
Neftochimic Burgas	2020–21	Bulgarian Second League	8	5	—		—		—		8	5
Pirin Blagoevgrad	2021–22	Bulgarian First League	17	4	2	0	—		—		19	4
Botev Plovdiv	2021–22	Bulgarian First League	11	1	—		—		1 (Note: Appearance in the Bulgarian First League UECL play-offs)	1	12	2
Botev Plovdiv	2022–23	Bulgarian First League	16	0	1	0	2 (Note: Appearances in the UEFA Europa Conference League)	0	—		19	0
Botev Plovdiv	2023–24	Bulgarian First League	10	0	3	0	—		—		13	0
Botev Plovdiv	Total		37	1	4	0	2	0	1	1	44	2
Fakel Voronezh (loan)	2022–23	Russian Premier League	13	0	—		—		2 (Note: Appearances in the relegation play-offs)	0	15	0
Fakel Voronezh	2024–25	Russian Premier League	29	1	3	0	—		—		32	1
Fakel Voronezh	2025–26	Russian Premier League	0	0	0	0	—		—		0	0
Fakel Voronezh	Total		42	1	3	0	—		2	0	47	1
CSKA Sofia	2025–26	Bulgarian First League	24	4	6	1	–		–		30	5
CSKA Sofia	2026–27	Bulgarian First League	10	0	1	1	8	0	0	0	19	1
CSKA Sofia	Total		34	4	7	2	8	0	0	0	49	6
CSKA Sofia II	2025–26	Bulgarian Second League	1	0	–		–		–		1	0
CSKA Sofia II	2026–27	Bulgarian Second League	1	0	–		–		–		1	0
CSKA Sofia II	Total		2	0	0	0	0	0	0	0	2	0
Career total			181	24	12	2	10	0	3	1	211	27

== Honours ==
Botev Plovdiv

- Bulgarian Cup: 2023–24

CSKA Sofia

- Bulgarian Cup: 2025–26
- Bulgarian Supercup: 2026
