= Julien Lamy =

French footballer (born 1999)

Personal information
- Full name: Julien Elie Lamy
- Date of birth: 6 November 1999 (age 27)
- Place of birth: Paris, France
- Height: 1.85 m (6 ft 1 in)
- Position: Winger

Team information
- Current team: Lokomotiv Plovdiv
- Number: 99

Youth career
- Plabennec
- –2016: AS Brestoise
- 2016–2017: Brest

Senior career*
Years	Team	Apps	(Gls)
2017–2018	Plabennec	16	(1)
2019–2020	Rotherham United	3	(0)
2020	→ AFC Wimbledon (loan)	2	(0)
2021	Grimsby Town	9	(0)
2021–2023	Enosis Neon Paralimni	57	(10)
2023	Celje	11	(0)
2024	Mura	11	(1)
2024–	Lokomotiv Plovdiv	71	(12)
- * Club domestic league appearances and goals as of 20:12, 31 May 2026 (UTC)

Julien Elie Lamy (born 6 November 1999) is a French professional footballer who plays as a winger for Bulgarian First League club Lokomotiv Plovdiv.

Having started his career in his native France with Brest II and Plabennec, Lamy has also played in England with Rotherham United, AFC Wimbledon and Grimsby Town.

== Career ==
Born in Paris, Lamy started his career in Plabennec. Later he moved to AS Brestoise, and in the 2016–17 season he played for Stade Brestois, before signing for his former club, Plabennec, in July 2017. He was released by Plabennec at the end of the 2017–18 season. During the 2018–19 season he had trials with English clubs West Bromwich Albion and Nottingham Forest. After also trialling with Rotherham United, he signed a one-year contract with the club in June 2019.

Lamy made his senior debut for Rotherham United on 8 October 2019, in the EFL Trophy. In January 2020, manager Paul Warne said Lamy had to impress whilst playing for the reserves if he wanted more first-team appearances.

On 31 January 2020, Lamy joined AFC Wimbledon on loan for the rest of the 2019–20 season. After the season, he was released by Rotherham United.

He signed for Grimsby Town on 5 February 2021, following a trial. On 12 May 2021 it was announced that he would leave Grimsby at the end of the season, following the expiry of his contract.

For the 2021–22 season, Lamy signed for Cypriot Second Division side Enosis Neon Paralimni.

In July 2023, he signed for Slovenian PrvaLiga club Celje on a contract until 2025. He moved to Mura in early 2024, before signing for Bulgarian club Lokomotiv Plovdiv in July 2024.
