= Bojan Milosavljević =

Swiss footballer (born 1998)

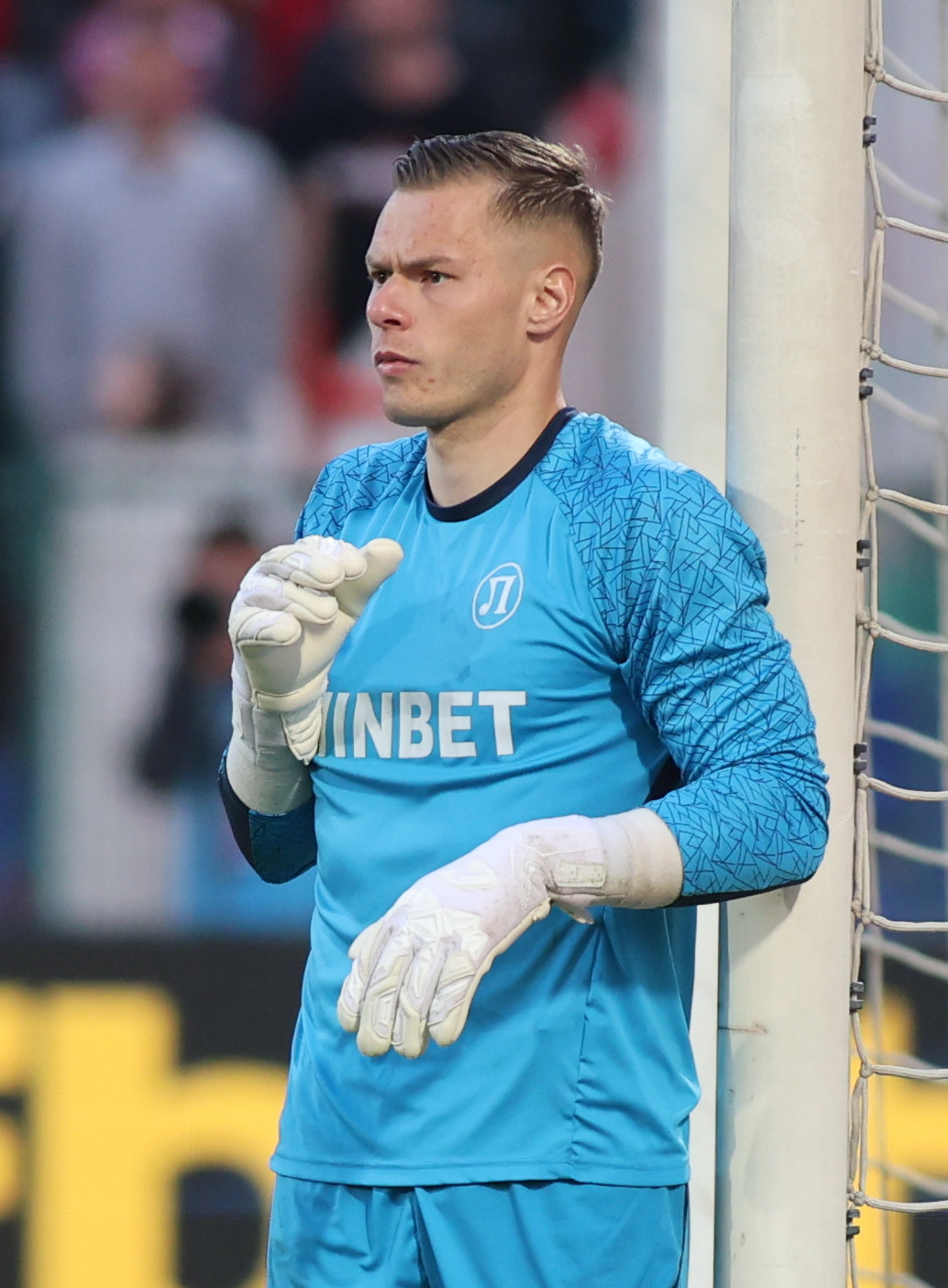

Personal information
- Date of birth: 31 July 1998 (age 28)
- Place of birth: Baden, Switzerland
- Height: 1.88 m (6 ft 2 in)
- Position: Goalkeeper

Team information
- Current team: Lokomotiv Plovdiv
- Number: 1

Youth career
- –2015: Baden
- 2015–2016: Zürich

Senior career*
Years	Team	Apps	(Gls)
2016–2018	Zürich U-21	10	(0)
2018–2020	Winterthur U-21	11	(0)
2018–2020	Winterthur	6	(0)
2020	Rapperswil-Jona	4	(0)
2021–2022	PO Xylotymbou	?	(?)
2022–2023	PAEEK Kyrenia	24	(0)
2023–2024	AEZ Zakakiou	18	(0)
2024–2025	Anorthosis	0	(0)
2025–	Lokomotiv Plovdiv	55	(0)
- * Club domestic league appearances and goals as of 29 August 2026

Bojan Milosavljević (born 31 July 1998) is a Swiss professional footballer who plays as goalkeeper for Bulgarian First League club Lokomotiv Plovdiv.

== Career ==
Milosavljević started his career at FC Baden before moving to the academy setup at FC Zürich in 2015. On 1 April 2017, he made his debut for Zürich U-21 in a 2–2 home draw against SC Brühl in the Promotion League, the third tier of Swiss football.

On 30 January 2025, Milosavljević signed a contract with Bulgarian First League club Lokomotiv Plovdiv. He made his debut on 23 February, keeping a clean sheet in a 1–0 league win over Lokomotiv Sofia. On 7 December 2025, he was voted Lokomotiv Plovdiv Player of the Year.
