= Zapro Dinev =

Bulgarian footballer

Personal information
- Full name: Zapro Georgiev Dinev
- Date of birth: 25 September 1999 (age 27)
- Place of birth: Petrich, Bulgaria
- Height: 1.80 m (5 ft 11 in)
- Position: Winger

Team information
- Current team: Beroe Stara Zagora (on loan from Lokomotiv Plovdiv)
- Number: 20

Senior career*
Years	Team	Apps	(Gls)
2016–2018	Belasitsa Petrich		
2019	Botev Plovdiv	2	(0)
2019–2020	Vitosha Bistritsa	22	(1)
2020	Septemvri Simitli	16	(3)
2021	Septemvri Sofia	6	(0)
2021	Septemvri Simitli	21	(6)
2022	Minyor Pernik	17	(4)
2022–2024	Belasitsa Petrich	53	(21)
2024–2025	Pirin Blagoevgrad	55	(12)
2026–	Lokomotiv Plovdiv	8	(0)
2026–	→ Beroe Stara Zagora (loan)	6	(5)
- * Club domestic league appearances and goals as of 31 October 2026

Zapro Georgiev Dinev (Bulgarian: Запро Георгиев Динев; born 25 September 1999) is a Bulgarian professional footballer who plays as a winger for Second League club Beroe Stara Zagora, on loan from Lokomotiv Plovdiv.
