= 2026–27 PFC CSKA Sofia season =

CSKA Sofia
2026–27 season
- Controlling owner: CSKA Red Hearts Foundation
- Manager: Hristo Yanev (until 9 September 2026); Daniel Morales (interim) (until 29 September 2026); Markus Gisdol (since 29 September 2026)
- Parva Liga: 1st
- Bulgarian Cup: Round of 16
- Bulgarian Supercup: Winners
- Bulgarian Elite Cup: Quarterfinal
- Europa League: Play-off round
- Conference League: League phase
- Top goalscorer: League: Joël Zwarts (9); All: Joël Zwarts (13)
Home colours	Away colours	Third colours
- All statistics correct as of 22 November 2026.

The 2026–27 season is CSKA Sofia's 78th season in the Parva Liga (the top flight of Bulgarian football). In addition to the domestic league, CSKA Sofia participated in this season's edition of the Bulgarian Cup, the UEFA Europa League and the UEFA Conference League. This marked its return to European football after two seasons. This article showed player statistics and all matches (official and friendly) that the club will play during the 2026–27 season.

== Players ==
=== Squad information ===
N	Pos.	Nat.	Name	Age	Since	App	Goals	Ends	Transfer fee	Notes
2	DF	(Brazil)	Pastor	26	2025	63	0	2028	€800,000	
3	DF	(Benin)	Tamimou Ouorou	23	2026	4	0	2027	Loan	
4	DF	(Portugal)	Dinis Almeida	31	2026	9	1	2028	Free	
5	DF	(Ivory Coast)	Jean-Philippe Gbamin	30	2026	23	2	2028	Free	
6	MF	(Portugal)	Bruno Jordão	27	2025	56	6	2028	€500,000	
7	MF	(Belarus)	Max Ebong	26	2025 (Winter)	44	6	2028	€425,000	
8	MF	(Italy)	Stefano Sensi	30	2026	25	4	2028	€200,000	
9	FW	(Argentina)	Santiago Godoy	25	2025	60	23	2028	€1,800,000	
10	FW	(Netherlands)	Joël Zwarts	27	2026	24	13	2029	€500,000	
11	MF	(France)	Mohamed Brahimi	27	2025	49	6	2028	Free	
14	DF	(Bulgaria)	Teodor Ivanov	22	2025	57	1	2029	€500,000	
17	DF	(Argentina)	Ángelo Martino	28	2025	53	1	2028	€345,000	
19	DF	(Bulgaria)	Andrey Yordanov	24	2025 (Note: Player's second spell at the club; 1st spell 2019–2020) (Winter)	27	0	2028	€150,000	
21	GK	(Belarus)	Fyodor Lapoukhov	23	2024 (Winter)	74	0	2028	€650,000	
25	GK	(Bulgaria)	Dimitar Evtimov	32	2025 (Note: Player's second spell at the club; 1st spell 2020–2025) (Winter)	34	0	2027	Free	
28	FW	(Cyprus)	Ioannis Pittas	29	2024 (Winter)	91	31	2028	€1,200,000	
30	MF	(Bulgaria)	Petko Panayotov	20	2024	73	5	2029	Youth system	
32	DF	(Argentina)	Facundo Rodríguez	26	2025 (Winter)	36	1	2027	Loan	
34	MF	(Bulgaria)	Vasil Kaymakanov	19	2020	3	0	2028	Youth system	
37	DF	(Republic of Ireland)	Barry Cotter	27	2026	8	0	2029	€100,000	
38	FW	(Brazil)	Léo Pereira	26	2025 (Winter)	33	3	2028	€800,000	
67	MF	(Romania)	Cătălin Itu	26	2026	9	0	2029	€300,000	
77	FW	(Colombia)	Alejandro Piedrahita	23	2025 (Winter)	21	2	2028	Free	
80	MF	(Bulgaria)	Georgi Chorbadzhiyski	21	2023	28	1	2027	Youth system	
91	DF	(Bulgaria)	Aleks Tunchev	17	2025	1	0	2029	Youth system	
94	MF	(Central African Republic)	Isaac Solet	25	2025 (Winter)	31	1	2028	€500,000	
99	MF	(Cameroon)	James Eto'o	25	2024	90	6	2029	€1,000,000	

- Last updated: 22 November 2026
- Source: Players transfer and Wikipedia players' articles
- Ordered by squad number.

== Transfers ==
=== In ===
No.	Pos.	Nat.	Name	Age	EU	Moving from	Type	Transfer window	Ends	Transfer fee	Source
22	FW	(Albania)	Kevin Dodaj	20	Non-EU	(Albania) KF Vllaznia Shkodër	Loan return	Summer	2028	Free	
80	MF	(Bulgaria)	Georgi Chorbadzhiyski	21	EU	(Bulgaria) Lokomotiv Plovdiv	Loan return	Summer	2027	Free	
—	DF	(Bulgaria)	Martin Stoychev	22	EU	(Bulgaria) Botev Vratsa	Loan return	Summer	2027	Free	
—	FW	(Guadeloupe)	Matthias Phaëton	26	EU	(Switzerland) FC Zürich	Loan return	Summer	2027	Free	
10	FW	(Netherlands)	Joël Zwarts	27	EU	(Bulgaria) Lokomotiv Plovdiv	Transfer	Summer	2029	€500,000	cska.bg
8	MF	(Italy)	Stefano Sensi	30	EU	(Cyprus) Anorthosis Famagusta	Transfer	Summer	2028	€200,000	cska.bg
3	DF	(Benin)	Tamimou Ouorou	23	Non-EU	(Bulgaria) Botev Vratsa	Loan	Summer	2027	Free	cska.bg
5	DF	(Ivory Coast)	Jean-Philippe Gbamin	30	EU	(France) Metz	Transfer	Summer	2028	Free	cska.bg
67	MF	(Romania)	Cătălin Itu	26	EU	(Bulgaria) Lokomotiv Plovdiv	Transfer	Summer	2029	€300,000	cska.bg
4	DF	(Portugal)	Dinis Almeida	31	EU	(Bulgaria) Ludogorets	Transfer	Summer	2028	Free	cska.bg
37	DF	(Republic of Ireland)	Barry Cotter	27	EU	(Republic of Ireland) Derry City	Transfer	Summer	2029	€100,000	cska.bg

=== Out ===
No.	Pos.	Nat.	Name	Age	EU	Moving to	Type	Transfer window	Transfer fee	Source
19	DF	(Bulgaria)	Ivan Turitsov	26	EU	(Georgia (country)) Dinamo Batumi	End of contract	Summer	Free	cska.bg
73	MF	(Bulgaria)	Ilian Iliev	26	EU	(Turkey) İstanbulspor	End of contract	Summer	Free	dsport.bg
91	FW	(Bulgaria)	Yoan Bornosuzov	22	EU	(Bulgaria) Slavia Sofia	Transfer	Summer	Free	dsport.bg
23	FW	(Bulgaria)	Ilian Antonov	21	EU	(Bulgaria) Slavia Sofia	Transfer	Summer	Free	dsport.bg
7	MF	(Norway)	Olaus Skarsem	27	EU	(Norway) Sarpsborg 08 FF	Released	Summer	Free	cska.bg
—	FW	(Bulgaria)	Mark-Emilio Papazov	22	EU	(Bulgaria) Lokomotiv Sofia	Transfer	Summer	Free	topsport.bg
33	DF	(The Gambia)	Sainey Sanyang	23	Non-EU	(Bulgaria) Botev Vratsa	Loan	Summer	Free	dsport.bg
5	DF	(Kosovo)	Lumbardh Dellova	27	Non-EU	(Turkey) Amedspor	Transfer	Summer	€950,000	cska.bg
—	FW	(Guadeloupe)	Matthias Phaëton	26	EU	(Singapore) Lion City Sailors	Transfer	Summer	€500,000	cska.bg
22	FW	(Albania)	Kevin Dodaj	20	Non-EU	(Poland) Lechia Gdańsk	Loan	Summer	Free	cska.bg
4	DF	(Spain)	Adrián Lapeña	30	EU	(Spain) Ceuta	Released	Summer	Free	cska.bg
29	FW	(Bulgaria)	Ivan Tasev	24	EU	(Bulgaria) Cherno More	Transfer	Summer	Free	dsport.bg
—	DF	(Bulgaria)	Aleksandar Buchkov	22	EU	(Bulgaria) Botev Vratsa	Transfer	Summer	Free	dsport.bg
77	FW	(Colombia)	Alejandro Piedrahita	24	Non-EU	(Canada) Toronto FC	Loan	Summer	Free	cska.bg
24	MF	(Bulgaria)	Yulian Iliev	21	EU	(Bulgaria) Lokomotiv Plovdiv	Loan	Summer	Free	dsport.bg

== Pre-season and friendlies ==
Win Draw Loss Fixtures

=== Pre-season ===
20 June 2026 Friendly	CSKA	2–1	(Slovenia) Brinje Grosuplje	Salzburg, Austria
18:00 UTC+3	Zwarts 80'; Pittas 90+1'	Report	Milošević 41'	Stadium: SAK-Sportanlage Nonntal

24 June 2026 Friendly	CSKA	0–4	(Ukraine) Polissya Zhytomyr	Mittersill, Austria
19:00 UTC+3		Report	Filippov 8'; Veleten 47'; Hayduchyk 52' (pen.); Fedor 62'	Stadium: Hohe Tauern Arena

27 June 2026 Friendly	CSKA	3–2	(Poland) Odra Opole	Salzburg, Austria
19:00 UTC+3	Solet 30'; Zwarts 49'; Pittas 90+1'	Report	Zatajski 47'; Kupczyk 90+2'	Stadium: Sportplatz Bolaring

3 July 2026 Friendly	CSKA	3–0	Marek	Pancharevo, Bulgaria
19:00 UTC+3	Sensi 5'; Panayotov 55'; Pittas 60'	Report		Stadium: Sporten kompleks Pancharevo

== Competitions ==
=== Overview ===
Competition	First match	Last match	Starting round	Final position	Record							
Competition	First match	Last match	Starting round	Final position	Pld	W	D	L	GF	GA	GD	Win %
Parva Liga	26 July 2026	May 2027	Matchday 1		15	10	5	0	35	12	+23	66.67
Bulgarian Cup	16−19 October 2026		First round		1	1	0	0	2	0	+2	100.00
Bulgarian Supercup	9 September 2026		Final	Winner	1	1	0	0	4	2	+2	100.00
Bulgarian Elite Cup	7 February 2027		Quarterfinal		0	0	0	0	0	0	+0	—
UEFA Europa League	9 July 2026	27 August 2026	First qualifying round	Play-off round	8	3	2	3	9	11	−2	37.50
UEFA Conference League	15 October 2026		League phase		3	0	1	2	4	6	−2	0.00
Total					28	15	8	5	54	31	+23	53.57

Last updated: 22 November 2026
Source: Competitions

=== Parva Liga ===
==== Regular stage ====
===== League table =====
Pos	Team	Pld	W	D	L	GF	GA	GD	Pts	Qualification
1	CSKA Sofia	15	10	5	0	35	12	+23	35	Qualification for the Championship group
2	Levski Sofia	14	11	2	1	29	9	+20	35	Qualification for the Championship group
3	CSKA 1948	15	9	3	3	34	17	+17	30	Qualification for the Championship group
4	Ludogorets	13	9	3	1	26	11	+15	30	Qualification for the Championship group
5	Botev Plovdiv	15	7	3	5	26	24	+2	24	Qualification for the Conference League group

Updated to match(es) played on 22 November 2026. Source: Bulgarian Football
Rules for classification: 1) Points; 2) Head-to-head points; 3) Head-to-head goal difference; 4) Head-to-head goals scored; 5) Head-to-head away goals scored (only if two teams); 6) Goal difference; 7) Goals scored; 8) Fairplay ranking; 9) Draw

===== Results summary =====
Overall								Home						Away					
Pld	W	D	L	GF	GA	GD	Pts	W	D	L	GF	GA	GD	W	D	L	GF	GA	GD
15	10	5	0	35	12	+23	35	6	1	0	19	5	+14	4	4	0	16	7	+9

Last updated: 22 November 2026.
Source: See results

===== Results by round =====
Round	1	2	3	4	5	6	7	8	9	10	11	12	13	14	15	16	17	18	19	20	21	22	23	24	25	26
Ground	A	H	H	A	H	A	H	A	H	A	A	H	A	H	A	A	H	A	H	A	H	A	H	H	A	H
Result	D	W	W	W	W	W	W	D	W	D	W	W	W	D	D											
Position	11	5	5	3	3	2	2	2	2	2	2	2	2	1	1											
Points	1	4	7	10	13	16	19	20	23	24	27	30	33	34	35											

Updated to match(es) played on 22 November 2026. Source: See Results
A = Away; H = Home; W = Win; D = Draw; L = Loss

===== Results =====
20 July 2026 1	Slavia	0–0	CSKA	Sofia
19:15 UTC+3	Stoev (yellow card) 47'; Nikolov (yellow card) 65'; Petkov (yellow card) 81'	Report	Ebong (yellow card) 85'; Jordão (yellow card) 87'	Stadium: Stadion Aleksandar Shalamanov; Attendance: 3,800; Referee: Radoslav Gidzhenov (Plovdiv); Man of the Match: Ivan Andonov

27 July 2026 2	CSKA	3–2	Botev Plovdiv	Sofia
21:15 UTC+3	Brahimi (yellow card) 19'; Zwarts 41', 89', (yellow card) 84'; Pittas 90+1'	Report	Algarra 38', (yellow card) 63'; Awany (yellow card) 69'; Kalu (yellow card) 77'; Chandarov 90+3'	Stadium: Natsionalen stadion Vasil Levski (Note: From the spring of 2024 CSKA plays their home games at Natsionalen stadion Vasil Levski, Sofia, instead of their regular stadium Stadion Balgarska Armia, Sofia, which is undergoing a major reconstruction.); Attendance: 3,500; Referee: Martin Velikov (Varna); Man of the Match: Joël Zwarts

2 August 2026 3	CSKA	2–1	Dunav	Sofia
21:15 UTC+3	Zwarts 17'; Piedrahita (yellow card) 31'; Rodríguez 79'; Kaymakanov (yellow card) 90+2'; Pittas (yellow card) 90+3'	Report	Apostolov 10'; Vidaković (yellow card) 62'	Stadium: Natsionalen stadion Vasil Levski; Attendance: 1,900; Referee: Volen Chinkov (Sofia); Man of the Match: Facundo Rodríguez

9 August 2026 4	Septemvri	0–3	CSKA	Sofia
21:15 UTC+3	Wade (yellow card) 68'	Report	Rodríguez (yellow card) 32'; Pittas 45' (pen.); Godoy 72'; Brahimi (yellow card) 79'; Solet 81'; Gbamin (yellow card) 84'	Stadium: Natsionalen stadion Vasil Levski (Note: Septemvri plays their league home games at Natsionalen stadion Vasil Levski, Sofia, instead of their regular stadium Stadion Septemvri, Sofia, which does not meet the BFU requirements.); Attendance: 1,200; Referee: Kristiyan Kolev (Plovdiv); Man of the Match: Andrey Yordanov

16 August 2026 5	CSKA	5–0	Botev Vratsa	Sofia
19:00 UTC+3	Zwarts 12', 72'; Solet (yellow card) 26'; Panayotov 38'; Itu (red card) 45+5'; T. Ivanov 65'; Godoy 79'	Report	Jovičić (yellow card) 32'; Dimitrov (yellow card) 62'; Borukov (yellow card) 82'	Stadium: Natsionalen stadion Vasil Levski; Attendance: 2,100; Referee: Nikola Popov (Sofia); Man of the Match: Joël Zwarts

30 August 2026 7	CSKA	3–1	Cherno More	Sofia
21:15 UTC+3	Brahimi (yellow card) 12'; Sensi 20'; Zwarts 30'; Rodríguez (yellow card) 47'; Lapoukhov (yellow card) 52'; Panayotov (yellow card) 78'; Godoy 86'	Report	Kerchev (yellow card) 28'; Sidney 39'; Squadrone (yellow card) 43'; Teles (yellow card) 45+3'; Atanasov (yellow card) 49'	Stadium: Natsionalen stadion Vasil Levski; Attendance: 1,700; Referee: Gero Piskov (Sofia); Man of the Match: Stefano Sensi

5 September 2026 8	Spartak	1–1	CSKA	Varna
19:00 UTC+3	Hanne 33'; A. Ivanov (yellow card) 51'; Iliev (yellow card) 63'	Report	Pittas 18'; Martino (yellow card) 36'; Pastor (yellow card) 76'; Gbamin (yellow card) 90+2'	Stadium: Stadion Spartak; Attendance: 4,000; Referee: Radoslav Gidzhenov (Plovdiv); Man of the Match: Boubacar Hanne

12 September 2026 9	CSKA	4–1	Arda	Sofia
21:15 UTC+3	Sensi 41' (pen.); Gbamin (yellow card) 45'; Pereira 48'; Zwarts 53'; Pittas 72' (pen.)	Report	Karagaren 2'; Yankov (yellow card) 34'; Velyev (yellow card) 42'; Paskalev (yellow card) 85'; Gospodinov (yellow card) 86'; Vutov (yellow card) 90+3'	Stadium: Natsionalen stadion Vasil Levski; Attendance: 1,600; Referee: Mihael Pavlov (Veliko Tarnovo); Man of the Match: Léo Pereira

16 September 2026 6	Lokomotiv Sofia	0–2	CSKA	Sofia
19:00 UTC+3	Papazov (yellow card) 67'; Minchev (yellow card) 77'	Report	Eto'o 37'; Zwarts 84'	Stadium: Stadion Lokomotiv; Attendance: 1,800; Referee: Martin Velikov (Varna); Man of the Match: James Eto'o
Note: The game was originally scheduled for 23 August 2026, but has been rescheduled due to CSKA's ongoing participation in the 2026–27 UEFA Europa League. On 1 September the technical committee of the BFU rescheduled the game for 16 September 2026.

20 September 2026 10	Lokomotiv Plovdiv	1–1	CSKA	Plovdiv
17:45 UTC+3	Umarbayev 10'; Lucas Ryan (yellow card) 43'; Burban (yellow card) 68'	Report	Pittas 18'; Cotter (yellow card) 85'; Ebong (yellow card) 90+3'	Stadium: Stadion Hristo Bonev; Attendance: 1,600; Referee: Mariyan Grebencharski (Samokov); Man of the Match: Parvizdzhon Umarbayev

11 October 2026 11	CSKA 1948	2–3	CSKA	Bistritsa
20:00 UTC+3	Cuéllar (yellow card) 27'; Grivić (yellow card) 48'; Franco 55', (yellow card) 63'; A. Iliev 68'; Mladenov (yellow card) 90'	Report	Jordão 19', 90', (yellow card) 75'; Pittas 28'; Lapoukhov (yellow card) 55'; Sensi (yellow card) 70' (yellow-red card) 90+3'; T. Ivanov (yellow card) 73'; Evtimov (yellow card) 75'	Stadium: Stadion Bistritsa; Attendance: 450; Referee: Lyuboslav Lyubomirov (Pernik); Man of the Match: Bruno Jordão

26 October 2026 12	CSKA	2–0	Ludogorets	Sofia
19:30 UTC+3	Martino 26', (yellow card) 63'; Jordão (yellow card) 52'; T. Ivanov (yellow card) 65'; Panayotov (yellow card) 82'; Godoy 88'	Report	Rwan Cruz (yellow card) 4'; Caio Vidal (yellow card) 60'; Stanić (yellow card) 86'	Stadium: Natsionalen stadion Vasil Levski; Attendance: 4,500; Referee: Mariyan Grebencharski (Samokov); Man of the Match: Ángelo Martino

31 October 2026 14	CSKA	0–0	Slavia	Sofia
19:30 UTC+2	Rodríguez (yellow card) 52'; Pastor (yellow card) 57'	Report	Miletić (yellow card) 42'; Minchev (penalty missed) 52'; Malembana (yellow card) 82'; Petkov (yellow card) 85'	Stadium: Stadion Balgarska Armia; Attendance: 18,240; Referee: Radoslav Gidzehnov (Plovdiv); Man of the Match: Fyodor Lapoukhov

8 November 2026 13	Levski	0–3	CSKA	Sofia
17:00 UTC+2	Aldair (yellow card) 28'; Centelles (yellow card) 31'; Sangaré (yellow card) 71'	Report	Rodríguez (yellow card) 5'; Ebong 9', (yellow card) 28'; Pittas 15'; Sensi (yellow card) 29'; Gbamin 57', (yellow card) 60'	Stadium: Natsionalen stadion Vasil Levski; Attendance: 28,000; Referee: Nikola Popov (Sofia); Man of the Match: Teodor Ivanov
Note: The game was originally scheduled for the period between 30 October and 2 November, but on 4 September the BFU switched the dates for the 13th and 14th rounds to avoid the derby being played close to the second round of the Bulgarian presidential elections.

22 November 2026 15	Botev Plovdiv	3–3	CSKA	Plovdiv
18:00 UTC+2	Tsonov 31', 36'; Chandarov (yellow card) 53'; Mascote (yellow card) 78'; Rodrigues 81'	Report	Martino (yellow card) 47'; Gbamin 51'; Zwarts 57'; Godoy 80', (yellow card) 80' (yellow-red card) 86'	Stadium: Stadion Hristo Botev; Referee: Gero Piskov (Sofia); Man of the Match: Samuil Tsonov

1 December 2026 16	Dunav	v	CSKA	Ruse
18:30 UTC+2		Report		Stadium: Gradski stadion

5 December 2026 17	CSKA	v	Septemvri	Sofia
17:30 UTC+2		Report		Stadium: Stadion Balgarska Armia

12–15 February 2027 18	Botev Vratsa	v	CSKA	Vratsa
--:-- UTC+2				Stadium: Stadion Hristo Botev

19–22 February 2027 19	CSKA	v	Lokomotiv Sofia	Sofia
--:-- UTC+2				Stadium: Stadion Balgarska Armia

26–28 February 2027 20	Cherno More	v	CSKA	Varna
--:-- UTC+2				Stadium: Stadion Ticha

5–8 March 2027 21	CSKA	v	Spartak	Sofia
--:-- UTC+2				Stadium: Stadion Balgarska Armia

12–15 March 2027 22	Arda	v	CSKA	Kardzhali
--:-- UTC+2				Stadium: Arena Arda

19–21 March 2027 23	CSKA	v	Lokomotiv Plovdiv	Sofia
--:-- UTC+2				Stadium: Stadion Balgarska Armia

2–5 April 2027 24	CSKA	v	CSKA 1948	Sofia
--:-- UTC+3				Stadium: Stadion Balgarska Armia

9–12 April 2027 25	Ludogorets	v	CSKA	Razgrad
--:-- UTC+3				Stadium: Huvepharma Arena

16–19 April 2027 26	CSKA	v	Levski	Sofia
--:-- UTC+3				Stadium: Natsionalen stadion Vasil Levski

=== Bulgarian Cup ===
18 October 2026 1R	Nesebar	0–2	CSKA	Nesebar
15:00 UTC+3	Dimov (yellow card) 50'; Stoyanov (yellow card) 52'	Report	Brahimi (yellow card) 38', (goal) 90+6'; Pittas 89' (pen.); T. Ivanov (yellow card) 90'; Jordão (yellow card) 90+2'	Stadium: Stadion Nesebar; Referee: Nikola Popov (Sofia)

14 December 2026 2R	Slavia	v	CSKA	Sofia
18:00 UTC+2		Report		Stadium: Stadion Aleksandar Shalamanov

=== Bulgarian Supercup ===
9 September 2026 Final	Levski	2–4	CSKA	Sofia
18:30 UTC+3	Grujić (yellow card) 19'; Serginho 40'; Dimitrov (red card) 81'; Perea (yellow card) 81'; Everton 90+4' (pen.)	Report	Almeida (yellow card) 45+1'; Zwarts 49', 70'; Sensi 65' (pen.); Ebong (red card) 81'; Pastor (yellow card) 81'; Martino (yellow card) 82'; Gbamin (yellow card) 84'; Aldair 89' (o.g.); Yanev (red card) 90'; Lapoukhov (yellow card) 90+7'	Stadium: Natsionalen stadion Vasil Levski; Attendance: 27,345; Referee: Gero Piskov (Sofia)

=== Bulgarian Elite Cup ===
7 February 2027 QF	CSKA	v	CSKA 1948	Sofia
--:-- UTC+2		Report		Stadium: Stadion Balgarska Armia

=== UEFA Europa League ===
==== First qualifying round ====
9 July 2026 First leg	CSKA (Bulgaria)	3–2	(Republic of Ireland) Derry City	Sofia, Bulgaria
21:00 UTC+3	Pittas 20', 53'; Jordão 42'	Report	Boyce 31'; Cotter (yellow card) 75'; Olayinka 89'	Stadium: Natsionalen stadion Vasil Levski; Attendance: 12,713; Referee: Visar Kastrati (Kosovo)

16 July 2026 Second leg	Derry City (Republic of Ireland)	1–2 (3–5 agg.)	(Bulgaria) CSKA	Derry, Northern Ireland
20:30 UTC+3	Chapman 47'; Grogan (yellow card) 84'	Report	Martino (yellow card) 46'; Pittas 74'; T. Ivanov (yellow card) 80'; Rodríguez (yellow card) 82'; Sensi (yellow card) 90+13'; Cotter 90+18' (o.g.)	Stadium: Ryan McBride Brandywell Stadium; Attendance: 4,155; Referee: Jasmin Šabotić (Luxembourg)

==== Second qualifying round ====
23 July 2026 First leg	Qarabağ (Azerbaijan)	0–0	(Bulgaria) CSKA	Baku, Azerbaijan
19:00 UTC+3	Janković (yellow card) 37'	Report	Godoy (yellow card) 35'; Rodríguez (yellow card) 77'	Stadium: Tofiq Bahramov Republican Stadium; Attendance: 23,813; Referee: Daniele Chiffi (Italy)

30 July 2026 Second leg	CSKA (Bulgaria)	0–0 (a.e.t.) (0–0 agg.) (5–4 p)	(Azerbaijan) Qarabağ	Sofia, Bulgaria
21:00 UTC+3	Jordão (yellow card) 39'; Godoy (yellow card) 48'; Eto'o (yellow card) 75'; Martino (yellow card) 95'; T. Ivanov (yellow card) 105+3'; Zwarts (yellow card) 112'	Report	Janković (yellow card) 50'; Várkonyi (yellow card) 55'; Langa (yellow card) 107'	Stadium: Natsionalen stadion Vasil Levski; Attendance: 16,172; Referee: Bram Van Driessche (Belgium)
	Penalties
	Pittas (penalty scored); T. Ivanov (penalty scored); Gbamin (penalty scored); Sensi (penalty scored); Eto'o (penalty scored)		(penalty scored) Janković; (penalty missed) Silva; (penalty scored) Mouaddib; (penalty scored) Cephas; (penalty scored) Montiel

==== Third qualifying round ====
6 August 2026 First leg	Maccabi Tel Aviv (Israel)	0–3	(Bulgaria) CSKA	Batumi, Georgia (Note: Due to the Gaza war, Israeli teams are required to play their home matches at neutral venues until further notice.)
19:00 UTC+3	Abu Farchi (yellow card) 31'; Camara (yellow card) 43'; Shlomo (yellow card) 85'	Report	Ebong 9'; Jordão (yellow card) 18'; Godoy 29'; Pittas (yellow card) 54'; Zwarts (yellow card) 85', (goal) 90'; Sensi (yellow card) 90+4'	Stadium: Adjarabet Arena; Attendance: 119; Referee: Manfredas Lukjančukas (Lithuania)

13 August 2026 Second leg	CSKA (Bulgaria)	1–3 (4–3 agg.)	(Israel) Maccabi Tel Aviv	Sofia, Bulgaria
21:00 UTC+3	Jordão (yellow card) 26'; Sensi (yellow card) 56', (goal) 66'; Ebong (yellow card) 88'	Report	Do. Peretz 12', (yellow card) 31'; Sokler 61'; Hélio Varela 69'; Sissokho (yellow card) 80'; Madmon (yellow card) 82'	Stadium: Natsionalen stadion Vasil Levski; Attendance: 23,653; Referee: Daniel Schlager (Germany)

==== Play-off round ====
20 August 2026 First leg	OFI Crete (Greece)	3–0	(Bulgaria) CSKA	Heraklion, Greece
21:00 UTC+3	Fountas 19', 51' (pen.); Dickmann 90+5'	Report	Sensi (yellow card) 53'; T. Ivanov (yellow card) 54'; Brahimi (red card) 81'	Stadium: Pankritio Stadium; Attendance: 12,668; Referee: Srđan Jovanović (Serbia)

27 August 2026 Second leg	CSKA (Bulgaria)	0–2 (0–5 agg.)	(Greece) OFI Crete	Sofia, Bulgaria
21:00 UTC+3	Itu (yellow card) 40'; Jordão (yellow card) 42'; Eto'o (yellow card) 88'	Report	Nikolaou (yellow card) 21'; Nuss 36'; Theodosoulakis 78'	Stadium: Natsionalen stadion Vasil Levski; Attendance: 18,428; Referee: Ivan Kružliak (Slovakia)

=== UEFA Conference League ===
==== League phase ====
Pos	Team	Pld	W	D	L	GF	GA	GD	Pts
26	(Albania) Egnatia	3	0	2	1	2	4	−2	2
27	(Kazakhstan) Kairat	3	0	2	1	3	7	−4	2
28	(Bulgaria) CSKA Sofia	3	0	1	2	4	6	−2	1
29	(Georgia (country)) Iberia 1999	3	0	1	2	2	5	−3	1
30	(Cyprus) Pafos	3	0	1	2	3	7	−4	1

Updated to match(es) played on 5 November 2026. Source: UEFA
Rules for classification: League phase tiebreakers

Round	1	2	3	4	5	6
Ground	H	A	A	H	A	H
Result	L	D	L			
Position	28	23	28			
Points	0	1	1			

Updated to match(es) played on 5 November 2026. Source: UEFA
A = Away; H = Home; W = Win; D = Draw; L = Loss

15 October 2026 1	CSKA (Bulgaria)	1–2	(France) Monaco	Sofia, Bulgaria
19:45 UTC+3	Sensi (yellow card) 51'; Ebong (yellow card) 69'; Zwarts 76'; Martino (yellow card) 90+5'	Report	Brunner 3'; Fati 43'; Diop (yellow card) 78'	Stadium: Natsionalen stadion Vasil Levski; Attendance: 22,025; Referee: João Gonçalves (Portugal)

22 October 2026 2	Nordsjælland (Denmark)	2–2	(Bulgaria) CSKA	Farum, Denmark
19:45 UTC+3	Olsen (yellow card) 35'; Acquah (yellow card) 36'; Adel 55', 67'; Janssen (yellow card) 59' (yellow-red card) 76'; Markmann (yellow card) 90'; Hansen (yellow card) 90'	Report	Godoy 8', 88'; Almeida (yellow card) 20'; T. Ivanov (yellow card) 84'; Solet (yellow card) 90'; Jordão (yellow card) 90'	Stadium: Right to Dream Park; Attendance: 3,879; Referee: Robert Jones (England)

5 November 2026 3	Panathinaikos (Greece)	2–1	(Bulgaria) CSKA	Athens, Greece
22:00 UTC+2	Calabria 41'; van Drongelen (yellow card) 45'; Louza (yellow card) 53'; Taborda 68'; Camara (yellow card) 77'; Andino (yellow card) 81'	Report	Almeida 44'	Stadium: Olympic Stadium; Attendance: 20,505; Referee: Mohammed Al-Hakim (Sweden)

26 November 2026 4	CSKA (Bulgaria)	v	(Turkey) Trabzonspor	Sofia, Bulgaria
22:00 UTC+2		Report		Stadium: Stadion Balgarska Armia

10 December 2026 5	KuPS (Finland)	v	(Bulgaria) CSKA	Tampere, Finland (Note: KuPS will play their home matches at Tammelan Stadion, Tampere, instead of their regular stadium, Kuopio Football Stadium, Kuopio, which does not meet UEFA requirements.)
19:45 UTC+2		Report		Stadium: Tammelan Stadion

17 December 2026 6	CSKA (Bulgaria)	v	(Switzerland) Thun	Sofia, Bulgaria
22:00 UTC+2		Report		Stadium: Stadion Balgarska Armia

== Statistics ==
=== Appearances and goals ===
No.	Pos	Nat	Player	Total		Parva Liga		Bulgarian Cup		Supercup		Elite Cup		Europa League		Conference League	
No.	Pos	Nat	Player	Apps	Goals	Apps	Goals	Apps	Goals	Apps	Goals	Apps	Goals	Apps	Goals	Apps	Goals
2	DF	(Brazil) BRA	Pastor	26	0	8+5	0	0+1	0	1	0	0	0	8	0	3	0
3	DF	(Benin) BEN	Tamimou Ouorou	4	0	1+1	0	0	0	0	0	0	0	0+1	0	0+1	0
4	DF	(Portugal) POR	Dinis Almeida	9	1	3+2	0	0	0	1	0	0	0	0	0	3	1
5	MF	(Ivory Coast) CIV	Jean-Philippe Gbamin	23	2	8+6	2	0	0	1	0	0	0	6+1	0	1	0
6	MF	(Portugal) POR	Bruno Jordão	26	3	12+2	2	1	0	0+1	0	0	0	7	1	2+1	0
7	MF	(Belarus) BLR	Max Ebong	23	2	10+2	1	0+1	0	1	0	0	0	6	1	2+1	0
8	MF	(Italy) ITA	Stefano Sensi	25	4	9+5	2	0	0	1	1	0	0	7	1	3	0
9	FW	(Argentina) ARG	Santiago Godoy	26	8	6+7	5	1	0	0+1	0	0	0	8	1	3	2
10	FW	(Netherlands) NED	Joël Zwarts	24	13	9+3	9	1	0	1	2	0	0	0+8	1	0+2	1
11	MF	(France) FRA	Mohamed Brahimi	19	1	8+2	0	1	1	0	0	0	0	0+7	0	0+1	0
14	DF	(Bulgaria) BUL	Teodor Ivanov	25	1	12	1	1	0	1	0	0	0	8	0	1+2	0
17	DF	(Argentina) ARG	Ángelo Martino	22	1	10+1	1	0+1	0	1	0	0	0	6	0	3	0
19	DF	(Bulgaria) BUL	Andrey Yordanov	16	0	5+5	0	1	0	0+1	0	0	0	2+1	0	1	0
21	GK	(Belarus) BLR	Fyodor Lapoukhov	26	-30	15	-12	0	0	1	-2	0	0	7	-10	3	-6
25	GK	(Bulgaria) BUL	Dimitar Evtimov	2	-1	0	0	1	0	0	0	0	0	1	-1	0	0
28	FW	(Cyprus) CYP	Ioannis Pittas	27	11	11+3	7	0+1	1	1	0	0	0	8	3	3	0
30	MF	(Bulgaria) BUL	Petko Panayotov	14	1	6+3	1	0	0	0	0	0	0	2+2	0	1	0
32	DF	(Argentina) ARG	Facundo Rodríguez	22	1	10+1	1	1	0	0+1	0	0	0	7	0	2	0
34	MF	(Bulgaria) BUL	Vasil Kaymakanov	2	0	0+2	0	0	0	0	0	0	0	0	0	0	0
37	DF	(Republic of Ireland) IRL	Barry Cotter	8	0	2+5	0	1	0	0	0	0	0	0	0	0	0
38	FW	(Brazil) BRA	Léo Pereira	14	1	5+4	1	0+1	0	0	0	0	0	0+3	0	1	0
67	MF	(Romania) ROU	Cătălin Itu	9	0	2+2	0	0	0	0+1	0	0	0	1+1	0	0+2	0
80	MF	(Bulgaria) BUL	Georgi Chorbadzhiyski	1	0	0+1	0	0	0	0	0	0	0	0	0	0	0
91	DF	(Bulgaria) BUL	Aleks Tunchev	0	0	0	0	0	0	0	0	0	0	0	0	0	0
94	MF	(Central African Republic) CAF	Isaac Solet	16	1	4+4	1	1	0	0	0	0	0	2+2	0	1+2	0
99	MF	(Cameroon) CMR	James Eto'o	22	1	8+4	1	1	0	1	0	0	0	2+4	0	0+2	0
Players who appeared for CSKA Sofia that left during the season:
77	FW	(Colombia) COL	Alejandro Piedrahita	3	0	1+1	0	0	0	0	0	0	0	0+1	0	0	0

=== Goalscorers ===
Rank	Pos	Nat	No	Name	Parva Liga	Bulgarian Cup	Supercup	Elite Cup	Europa League	Conference League	Total
1	FW	(Netherlands)	10	Joël Zwarts	9	0	2	0	1	1	13
2	FW	(Cyprus)	28	Ioannis Pittas	7	1	0	0	3	0	11
3	FW	(Argentina)	9	Santiago Godoy	5	0	0	0	1	2	8
4	MF	(Italy)	8	Stefano Sensi	2	0	1	0	1	0	4
5	MF	(Portugal)	6	Bruno Jordão	2	0	0	0	1	0	3
6	MF	(Ivory Coast)	5	Jean-Philippe Gbamin	2	0	0	0	0	0	2
6	MF	(Belarus)	7	Max Ebong	1	0	0	0	1	0	2
8	DF	(Bulgaria)	4	Dinis Almeida	0	0	0	0	0	1	1
8	MF	(France)	11	Mohamed Brahimi	0	1	0	0	0	0	1
8	DF	(Bulgaria)	14	Teodor Ivanov	1	0	0	0	0	0	1
8	DF	(Argentina)	17	Ángelo Martino	1	0	0	0	0	0	1
8	MF	(Bulgaria)	30	Petko Panayotov	1	0	0	0	0	0	1
8	DF	(Argentina)	32	Facundo Rodríguez	1	0	0	0	0	0	1
8	MF	(Brazil)	38	Léo Pereira	1	0	0	0	0	0	1
8	MF	(Central African Republic)	94	Isaac Solet	1	0	0	0	0	0	1
8	MF	(Cameroon)	99	James Eto'o	1	0	0	0	0	0	1
				Own goal	0	0	1	0	1	0	2
Total					35	2	4	0	9	4	54

As of 22 November 2026

=== Clean sheets ===
Rank	Nat	No	Name	Parva Liga	Bulgarian Cup	Supercup	Elite Cup	Europa League	Conference League	Total
1	(Belarus)	21	Fyodor Lapoukhov	7	0	0	0	3	0	10
2	(Bulgaria)	25	Dimitar Evtimov	0	1	0	0	0	0	1
Total				7	1	0	0	3	0	11

As of 22 November 2026

=== Disciplinary Record ===
Includes all competitive matches. Players listed below made at least one appearance for CSKA first squad during the season.

N	P	Nat.	Name	Parva Liga			Bulgarian Cup			Supercup			Europa League			Conference League			Total			Notes
N	P	Nat.	Name	Yellow card	Second yellow card	Red card	Yellow card	Second yellow card	Red card	Yellow card	Second yellow card	Red card	Yellow card	Second yellow card	Red card	Yellow card	Second yellow card	Red card	Yellow card	Second yellow card	Red card	Notes
2	DF	(Brazil)	Pastor	2						1									3			
4	DF	(Portugal)	Dinis Almeida							1						1			2			
5	DF	(Ivory Coast)	Jean-Philippe Gbamin	4						1									5			
6	MF	(Portugal)	Bruno Jordão	3			1						4			1			9			
7	MF	(Belarus)	Max Ebong	3								1	1			1			5		1	
8	MF	(Italy)	Stefano Sensi	1	1								4			1			6	1		
9	FW	(Argentina)	Santiago Godoy	1	1								2						3	1		
10	FW	(Netherlands)	Joël Zwarts	1									2						3			
11	MF	(France)	Mohamed Brahimi	3			1								1				4		1	
14	DF	(Bulgaria)	Teodor Ivanov	2			1						3			1			7			
17	DF	(Argentina)	Ángelo Martino	3						1			2			1			7			
21	GK	(Belarus)	Fyodor Lapoukhov	2						1									3			
25	GK	(Bulgaria)	Dimitar Evtimov	1															1			
28	FW	(Cyprus)	Ioannis Pittas	1									1						2			
30	MF	(Bulgaria)	Petko Panayotov	2															2			
32	DF	(Argentina)	Facundo Rodríguez	4									2						6			
34	MF	(Bulgaria)	Vasil Kaymakanov	1															1			
37	DF	(Republic of Ireland)	Barry Cotter	1															1			
67	MF	(Romania)	Cătălin Itu			1							1						1		1	
77	FW	(Colombia)	Alejandro Piedrahita	1															1			
94	MF	(Central African Republic)	Isaac Solet	1												1			2			
99	MF	(Cameroon)	James Eto'o										2						2			
M		(Bulgaria)	Hristo Yanev									1									1	

Last updated: 22 November 2026
Source: Competitive matches
Only competitive matches
Ordered by (red card) , (second yellow card) and (yellow card)
(yellow card) = Number of bookings; (second yellow card) = Number of sending offs after a second yellow card; (red card) = Number of sending offs by a direct red card.

== See also ==
- PFC CSKA Sofia
