= Daniel Nikolov (footballer) =

Bulgarian footballer

Personal information
- Full name: Daniel Nikolaev Nikolov
- Date of birth: 14 December 2005 (age 20)
- Place of birth: Ruse, Bulgaria
- Height: 1.91 m (6 ft 3 in)
- Position: Goalkeeper

Team information
- Current team: CSKA Sofia
- Number: 31

Youth career
- 2015–2021: Dunav Ruse

Senior career*
Years	Team	Apps	(Gls)
2022–2025	Dunav Ruse	43	(0)
2025–	CSKA Sofia II	34	(0)
2026–	CSKA Sofia	0	(0)
- * Club domestic league appearances and goals as of 19:13, 16 November 2026 (UTC)

Daniel Nikolaev Nikolov (Bulgarian: Даниел Николаев Николов; born 14 December 2005) is a Bulgarian footballer who plays as a goalkeeper for CSKA Sofia.

== Career ==
A youth player of Dunav Ruse since at least 2015, he plays as a goalkeeper. In July 2021, he was integrated into the first team. He made his debut for the team on 19 November 2022 in a 1–2 loss to Arda Kardzhali in the Bulgarian Cup tournament. On 1 July 2025, he signed with CSKA and will compete in the team's second team.

== Career statistics ==
As of 15 November 2026

Appearances and goals by club, season and competition
Club	Season	League			National cup		Europe		Other		Total	
Club	Season	Division	Apps	Goals	Apps	Goals	Apps	Goals	Apps	Goals	Apps	Goals
Dunav Ruse	2022–23	Second League	1	0	1	0	–		–		2	0
Dunav Ruse	2023–24	Second League	9	0	1	0	–		–		10	0
Dunav Ruse	2024–25	Second League	33	0	1	0	–		–		34	0
Dunav Ruse	Total		43	0	3	0	0	0	0	0	46	0
CSKA Sofia II	2025–26	Second League	20	0	–		–		–		20	0
CSKA Sofia II	2026–27	Second League	14	0	–		–		–		14	0
CSKA Sofia II	Total		34	0	0	0	0	0	0	0	34	0
CSKA Sofia	2026–27	First League	0	0	0	0	0	0	0	0	0	0
Career total			77	0	3	0	0	0	0	0	80	0
