= Fyodor Lapoukhov =

Belarusian footballer

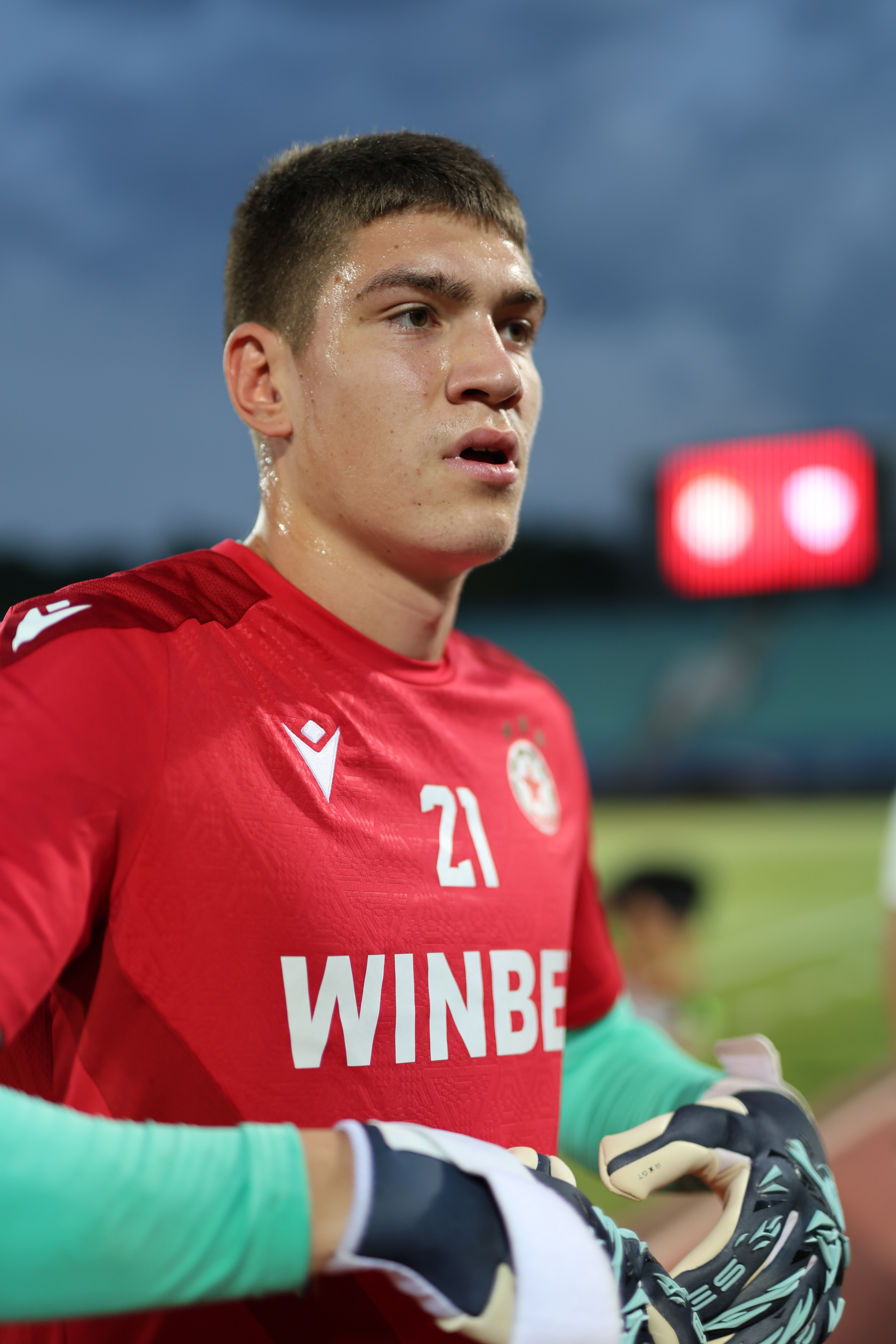

Personal information
- Full name: Fyodor Yuryevich Lapoukhov
- Date of birth: 20 June 2003 (age 23)
- Place of birth: Minsk, Belarus
- Height: 1.90 m (6 ft 3 in)
- Position: Goalkeeper

Team information
- Current team: CSKA Sofia
- Number: 21

Youth career
- Dinamo Minsk

Senior career*
Years	Team	Apps	(Gls)
2021–2024	Dinamo Minsk	48	(0)
2021	→ Lida (loan)	10	(0)
2025–	CSKA Sofia	54	(0)
2025	CSKA Sofia II	2	(0)

International career^{‡}
2023	Belarus U21	6	(0)
2024–	Belarus	20	(0)
- * Club domestic league appearances and goals as of 17:04, 22 November 2026 (UTC) ‡ National team caps and goals as of 09:39, 13 November 2026 (UTC)

Fyodor Yuryevich Lapoukhov (Belarusian: Фёдар Юр'евіч Лапавухаў; Russian: Фёдор Юрьевич Лапоухов; born 20 June 2003) is a Belarusian professional footballer who plays as a goalkeeper for Bulgarian First League club CSKA Sofia and the Belarus national team.

== International career ==
Lapoukhov made his debut for the Belarus national team on 11 June 2024 in a friendly against Israel at the Szusza Ferenc Stadion in Budapest, Hungary. He substituted Sergey Ignatovich in the 80th minute, Israel won 4–0.

== Career statistics ==
=== Club ===
As of 22 November 2026

Appearances and goals by club, season and competition
Club	Season	League			National cup		Europe		Other		Total	
Club	Season	Division	Apps	Goals	Apps	Goals	Apps	Goals	Apps	Goals	Apps	Goals
Lida (loan)	2021	Belarusian First League	10	0	0	0	–		–		10	0
Dinamo Minsk	2022	Belarusian Premier League	0	0	0	0	–		–		0	0
Dinamo Minsk	2023	Belarusian Premier League	20	0	0	0	2	0	–		22	0
Dinamo Minsk	2024	Belarusian Premier League	28	0	5	0	14	0	1	0	48	0
Dinamo Minsk	Total		48	0	5	0	16	0	1	0	70	0
CSKA Sofia	2024–25	Bulgarian First League	10	0	3	0	–		1	0	14	0
CSKA Sofia	2025–26	Bulgarian First League	29	0	5	0	–		–		34	0
CSKA Sofia	2026–27	Bulgarian First League	15	0	0	0	10	0	1	0	26	0
CSKA Sofia	Total		54	0	8	0	10	0	2	0	64	0
CSKA Sofia II	2025–26	Bulgarian Second League	2	0	–		–		–		2	0
Career total			114	0	13	0	26	0	3	0	154	0

=== International ===
As of match played 12 November 2026

Appearances and goals by national team and year
National team	Year	Apps	Goals
Belarus	2024	7	0
Belarus	2025	7	0
Belarus	2026	6	0
Total		20	0

== Honours ==
Dynamo Minsk

- Belarusian Premier League: 2023, 2024

CSKA Sofia

- Bulgarian Cup: 2025–26
- Bulgarian Supercup: 2026
