= Teodor Ivanov =

Bulgarian footballer (born 2004)

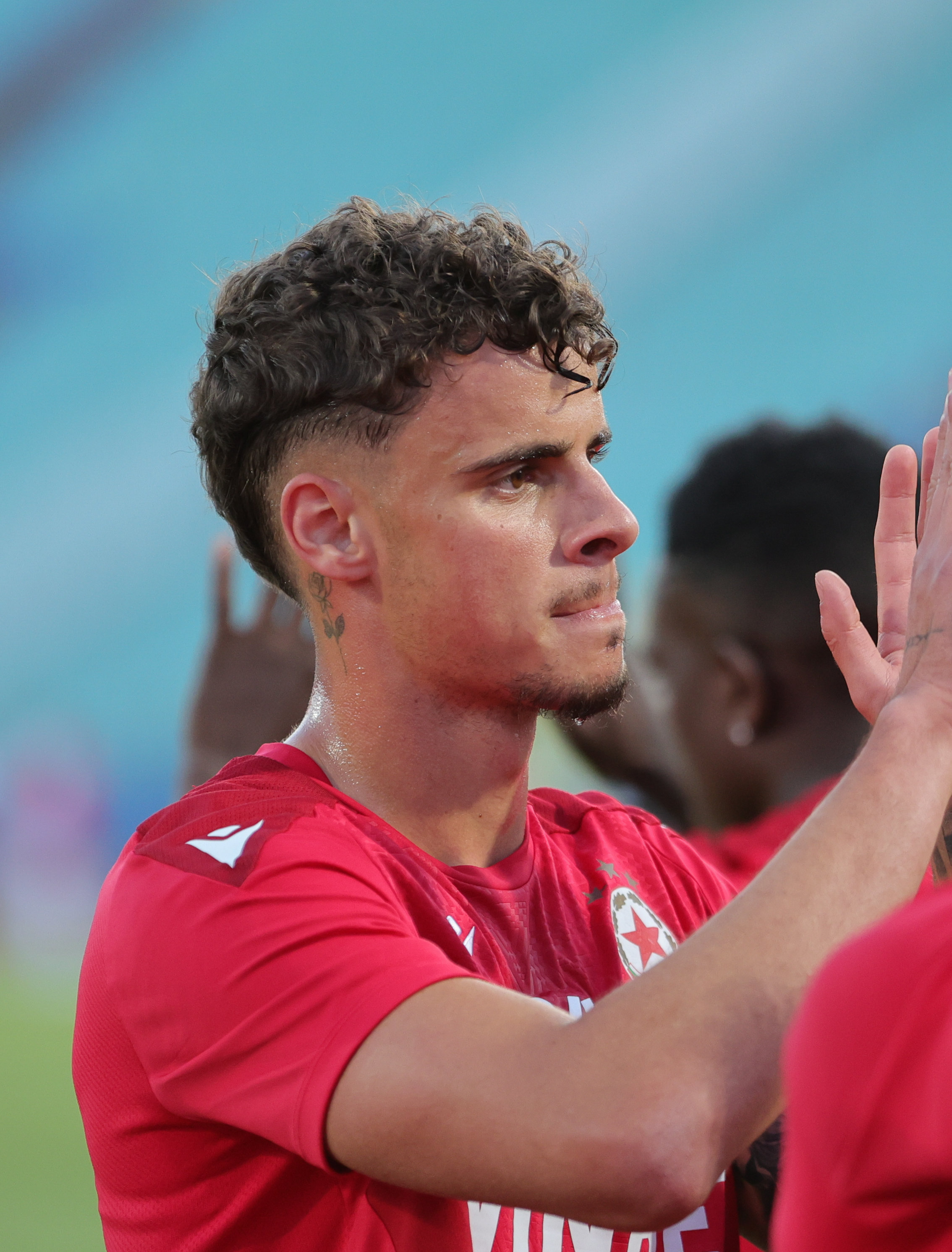

Personal information
- Full name: Teodor Valentinov Ivanov
- Date of birth: 13 March 2004 (age 22)
- Place of birth: Pleven, Bulgaria
- Height: 1.89 m (6 ft 2 in)
- Position: Defender

Team information
- Current team: CSKA Sofia
- Number: 14

Youth career
- –2020: CSKA Sofia
- 2020–2021: Hellas Verona
- 2021–2022: Ternana
- 2022–2024: CSKA 1948

Senior career*
Years	Team	Apps	(Gls)
2022–2024	CSKA 1948 III	28	(1)
2022–2025	CSKA 1948 II	21	(0)
2024–2025	CSKA 1948	42	(0)
2025–	CSKA Sofia II	1	(0)
2025–	CSKA Sofia	38	(1)

International career^{‡}
2020	Bulgaria U17	1	(0)
2022	Bulgaria U19	7	(1)
2024	Bulgaria U20	1	(0)
2024–	Bulgaria U21	8	(0)
2026–	Bulgaria	4	(0)
- * Club domestic league appearances and goals as of 16:33, 8 November 2026 (UTC) ‡ National team caps and goals as of 20:24, 26 September 2026 (UTC)

Teodor Valentinov Ivanov (Bulgarian: Теодор Валентинов Иванов; born 13 March 2004) is a Bulgarian professional footballer who plays as a defender for CSKA Sofia and the Bulgaria national team.

He is the son of Bulgaria's national team player Valentin Iliev and grandson of Iliya Valov, who was also a national player.

== Career ==
Teodor joined CSKA 1948 from Ternana in February 2022. Before that, he was part of Hellas Verona academy. In December 2023 he signed his first professional contract with CSKA 1948. He made his professional debut for the club in a league match against CSKA Sofia on 9 March 2024. In June 2025, he signed a contract with CSKA Sofia, becoming the team's first summer signing.

== Career statistics ==
=== Club ===
As of 8 November 2026

Appearances and goals by club, season and competition
Club	Season	League			National cup		Europe		Other		Total	
Club	Season	Division	Apps	Goals	Apps	Goals	Apps	Goals	Apps	Goals	Apps	Goals
CSKA 1948 III	2022–23	Third League	25	1	–		–		–		25	1
CSKA 1948 III	2023–24	Third League	3	0	–		–		–		3	0
CSKA 1948 III	Total		28	1	0	0	0	0	0	0	28	1
CSKA 1948 II	2022–23	Second League	2	0	–		–		–		2	0
CSKA 1948 II	2023–24	Second League	16	0	–		–		–		16	0
CSKA 1948 II	2024–25	Second League	3	0	–		–		–		3	1
CSKA 1948 II	Total		21	0	0	0	0	0	0	0	21	0
CSKA 1948	2023–24	First League	13	0	0	0	–		1	0	14	0
CSKA 1948	2024–25	First League	29	0	2	0	4	0	–		35	0
CSKA 1948	Total		42	0	2	0	4	0	1	0	49	1
CSKA Sofia	2025–26	First League	26	0	6	0	–		–		32	0
CSKA Sofia	2026–27	First League	12	1	1	0	11	0	1	0	25	1
CSKA Sofia	Total		38	1	7	0	11	0	1	0	57	1
CSKA Sofia II	2025–26	Second League	1	0	–		–		–		1	0
Career total			130	2	9	0	15	0	2	0	156	2

=== International ===
As of match played 26 September 2026

Appearances and goals by national team and year
National team	Year	Apps	Goals
Bulgaria
Bulgaria	2026	4	0
Total		4	0

== International career ==
In August 2022 he received his first call up for Bulgaria U19.

== Honours ==
CSKA Sofia

- Bulgarian Cup: 2025–26
- Bulgarian Supercup: 2026
