= Vasil Kaymakanov =

Bulgarian footballer

Personal information
- Full name: Vasil Stanislavov Kaymakanov
- Date of birth: 1 January 2007 (age 19)
- Place of birth: Samokov, Bulgaria
- Positions: Attacking midfielder; winger

Team information
- Current team: CSKA Sofia
- Number: 34

Youth career
- –2025: CSKA Sofia

Senior career*
Years	Team	Apps	(Gls)
2022–	CSKA Sofia II	63	(9)
2024–2026	CSKA Sofia III	24	(2)
2026–	CSKA Sofia	3	(0)

International career^{‡}
2022–2023	Bulgaria U16	5	(2)
2023–2024	Bulgaria U17	11	(0)
2024–2025	Bulgaria U19	13	(1)
2026–	Bulgaria U21	1	(0)
- * Club domestic league appearances and goals as of 19:15, 16 November 2026 (UTC) ‡ National team caps and goals as of 18:12, 2 October 2026 (UTC)

Vasil Stanislavov Kaymakanov (Bulgarian: Васил Станиславов Каймаканов; born 1 January 2007) is a Bulgarian footballer who plays as an attacking midfielder for CSKA Sofia II.

== Career ==
A youth player of CSKA Sofia , plays as a winger. He moved to the CSKA academy. In the 2024–25 season, he trained with the third team of CSKA several times. He began preparing for the 2025–26 season in the second team of CSKA.

He made his debut for the army team on 25 May 2026 in a 1–0 loss against Ludogorets Razgrad.

== Career statistics ==
As of 15 November 2026

Appearances and goals by club, season and competition
Club	Season	League			National cup		Europe		Other		Total	
Club	Season	Division	Apps	Goals	Apps	Goals	Apps	Goals	Apps	Goals	Apps	Goals
CSKA Sofia II	2022–23	Third League	3	0	–		–		–		3	0
CSKA Sofia II	2023–24	Third League	14	1	–		–		–		14	1
CSKA Sofia II	2024–25	Second League	12	1	–		–		–		12	1
CSKA Sofia II	2025–26	Second League	21	5	–		–		–		21	5
CSKA Sofia II	2025–26	Second League	13	2	–		–		–		13	2
CSKA Sofia II	Total		63	9	0	0	0	0	0	0	63	9
CSKA Sofia III	2024–25	Third League	19	2	–		–		–		19	2
CSKA Sofia III	2025–26	Third League	5	0	–		–		–		5	0
CSKA Sofia III	Total		24	2	0	0	0	0	0	0	24	2
CSKA Sofia	2025–26	First League	1	0	0	0	–		–		1	0
CSKA Sofia	2026–27	First League	2	0	0	0	0	0	0	0	2	0
CSKA Sofia	Total		3	0	0	0	0	0	0	0	3	0
Career total			90	11	0	0	0	0	0	0	90	11
