= Georgi Chorbadzhiyski =

Bulgarian footballer

Personal information
- Full name: Georgi Brankov Chorbadzhiyski
- Date of birth: 28 August 2004 (age 22)
- Place of birth: Sofia, Bulgaria
- Height: 1.77 m (5 ft 10 in)
- Position: Midfielder

Team information
- Current team: CSKA Sofia
- Number: 80

Youth career
- 2014–: CSKA Sofia

Senior career*
| Years | Team | Apps | (Gls) |
| 2022– | CSKA Sofia II | 58 | (17) |
| 2023– | CSKA Sofia | 22 | (1) |
| 2025 | CSKA Sofia III | 2 | (0) |
| 2026 | → Lokomotiv Plovdiv (loan) | 12 | (0) |

International career^{‡}
| 2020 | Bulgaria U17 | 0 | (0) |
| 2022 | Bulgaria U19 | 4 | (0) |
| 2024 | Bulgaria U20 | 1 | (0) |
| 2025 | Bulgaria U21 | 5 | (0) |
- * Club domestic league appearances and goals as of 16:51, 27 September 2026 (UTC) ‡ National team caps and goals as of 17:41, 31 March 2026 (UTC)

Georgi Brankov Chorbadzhiyski (Bulgarian: Георги Бранков Чорбаджийски; born 28 August 2004) is a Bulgarian professional footballer who plays as a midfielder for CSKA Sofia.

== Career ==
As a youth player, he went through all the ranks of the youth team. In 2021 he was included in the squad against Roma in the UEFA Conference League. From the 2023/24 season he was included in the first-team squad and made his debut against Botev Vratsa on 19 August 2023.

== Personal life ==
Chorbadzhiyski's older brother Bozhidar is also a footballer, currently playing for Diósgyőri in Hungary.

== Career statistics ==
As of 27 September 2026

Appearances and goals by club, season and competition
| Club | Season | League | | | National cup | | Europe | | Other | | Total | |
| Club | Season | Division | Apps | Goals | Apps | Goals | Apps | Goals | Apps | Goals | Apps | Goals |
|---|---|---|---|---|---|---|---|---|---|---|---|---|
| CSKA Sofia II | 2022–23 | Third League | 16 | 4 | – | | – | | – | | 16 | 4 |
| CSKA Sofia II | 2023–24 | Third League | 23 | 10 | – | | – | | – | | 23 | 10 |
| CSKA Sofia II | 2024–25 | Second League | 2 | 0 | – | | – | | – | | 2 | 0 |
| CSKA Sofia II | 2025–26 | Second League | 9 | 3 | – | | – | | – | | 9 | 3 |
| CSKA Sofia II | 2026–27 | Second League | 8 | 0 | – | | – | | – | | 8 | 0 |
| CSKA Sofia II | Total | | 58 | 17 | 0 | 0 | 0 | 0 | 0 | 0 | 58 | 17 |
| CSKA Sofia | 2023–24 | First League | 5 | 0 | 1 | 0 | 0 | 0 | 1 | 0 | 7 | 0 |
| CSKA Sofia | 2024–25 | First League | 10 | 1 | 2 | 0 | – | | 1 | 0 | 13 | 1 |
| CSKA Sofia | 2025–26 | First League | 6 | 0 | 1 | 0 | – | | – | | 7 | 0 |
| CSKA Sofia | 2026–27 | First League | 1 | 0 | 0 | 0 | 0 | 0 | 0 | 0 | 1 | 0 |
| CSKA Sofia | Total | | 22 | 1 | 4 | 0 | 0 | 0 | 2 | 0 | 28 | 1 |
| CSKA Sofia III | 2024–25 | Third League | 2 | 0 | – | | – | | – | | 2 | 0 |
| Lokomotiv Plovdiv (loan) | 2025–26 | First League | 12 | 0 | 2 | 1 | – | | 1 | 0 | 15 | 1 |
| Career total | | | 94 | 18 | 6 | 1 | 0 | 0 | 3 | 0 | 103 | 19 |
