= Aleks Tunchev =

Bulgarian footballer (born 2008)

- Tunchev in 2026

Personal information
- Full name: Aleks Aleksandrov Tunchev
- Date of birth: 19 December 2008 (age 17)
- Place of birth: Leicester, England
- Position: Centre-back

Team information
- Current team: CSKA Sofia II
- Number: 15

Youth career
- Elit Sofia
- National Sofia
- –2025: CSKA Sofia

Senior career*
Years	Team	Apps	(Gls)
2025–2026	CSKA Sofia III	1	(0)
2025–	CSKA Sofia II	26	(0)
2026–	CSKA Sofia	1	(0)

International career^{‡}
2025–	Bulgaria U19	12	(1)
- * Club domestic league appearances and goals as of 17:59, 13 September 2026 (UTC) ‡ National team caps and goals as of 14:20, 17 November 2026 (UTC)

Aleks Aleksandrov Tunchev (Bulgarian: Алекс Александров Тунчев; born 19 December 2008) is a footballer who plays as a centre-back for CSKA Sofia. Born in England, he represents Bulgaria at youth level.

== Club career ==
A youth player of Elit Sofia, plays as a central defender. He moved to the CSKA academy. In the 2024/25 season, he trained with the third team of CSKA several times, but failed to make an official debut. He began preparing for the 2025/26 season in the second team of CSKA.

He played for the second and third teams during the season, but in early October 2025 he was called up to train with the first team and participated in a test match. He made his debut for the army team on 6 February 2026 in a 3:1 victory over Arda Kardzhali.

== Career statistics ==
As of 13 September 2026

Appearances and goals by club, season and competition
Club	Season	League			National cup		Europe		Other		Total	
Club	Season	Division	Apps	Goals	Apps	Goals	Apps	Goals	Apps	Goals	Apps	Goals
CSKA Sofia II	2025–26	Second League	18	0	–		–		–		18	0
CSKA Sofia II	2026–27	Second League	8	0	–		–		–		8	0
CSKA Sofia II	Total		26	0	0	0	0	0	0	0	26	0
CSKA Sofia III	2025–26	Third League	1	0	–		–		–		1	0
CSKA Sofia	2025–26	First League	1	0	0	0	–		–		1	0
CSKA Sofia	2026–27	First League	0	0	0	0	0	0	0	0	0	0
CSKA Sofia	Total		1	0	0	0	0	0	0	0	1	0
Career total			28	0	0	0	0	0	0	0	28	0

== Personal life ==
He is the son of former football player Aleksandar Tunchev.
