= Ivan Tasev (footballer) =

Bulgarian footballer

Personal information
- Full name: Ivan Kostadinov Tasev
- Date of birth: 5 September 2002 (age 24)
- Place of birth: Sandanski, Bulgaria
- Height: 1.75 m (5 ft 9 in)
- Position: Winger

Team information
- Current team: Cherno More (on loan from CSKA Sofia)
- Number: 17

Youth career
- –2019: Pirin Blagoevgrad

Senior career*
Years	Team	Apps	(Gls)
2019–2024	Pirin Blagoevgrad	80	(7)
2021	→ Septemvri Simitli (loan)	7	(0)
2024–	CSKA Sofia II	43	(10)
2024–	CSKA Sofia	16	(2)
2026–	→ Cherno More (loan)	5	(0)

International career^{‡}
2021	Bulgaria U19	1	(1)
2022–2023	Bulgaria U21	7	(0)
- * Club domestic league appearances and goals as of 14:00, 19 October 2026 (UTC) ‡ National team caps and goals as of 05:19, 23 March 2024 (UTC)

Ivan Kostadinov Tasev (Bulgarian: Иван Костадинов Тасев; born 5 September 2002) is a Bulgarian professional footballer who plays as a winger for First League club Cherno More Varna on loan from CSKA Sofia.

== Career ==
As a youth player, he went through the youth academy of Pirin Blagoevgrad.

Tasev made his professional debut in the Second League game against Botev Galabovo on 20 February 2020.

On 19 August 2026, Tasev signed with Cherno More Varna on loan for the 2026–27 season.

== Career statistics ==
As of 17 October 2026

Appearances and goals by club, season and competition
Club	Season	League			National cup		Europe		Other		Total	
Club	Season	Division	Apps	Goals	Apps	Goals	Apps	Goals	Apps	Goals	Apps	Goals
Pirin Blagoevgrad	2018–19	Second League	0	0	0	0	–		–		0	0
Pirin Blagoevgrad	2019–20	Second League	4	0	0	0	–		–		4	0
Pirin Blagoevgrad	2020–21	Second League	0	0	0	0	–		–		0	0
Pirin Blagoevgrad	2021–22	First League	15	1	0	0	–		–		15	1
Pirin Blagoevgrad	2022–23	First League	30	2	0	0	–		–		30	2
Pirin Blagoevgrad	2023–24	First League	31	4	3	2	–		–		34	6
Pirin Blagoevgrad	Total		80	7	3	2	0	0	0	0	83	9
Septemvri Simitli (loan)	2020–21	Second League	7	0	0	0	–		–		7	0
CSKA Sofia II	2024–25	Second League	20	2	–		–		–		20	2
CSKA Sofia II	2025–26	Second League	20	7	–		–		–		20	7
CSKA Sofia II	2026–27	Second League	3	1	–		–		–		3	1
CSKA Sofia II	Total		43	10	0	0	0	0	0	0	43	10
CSKA Sofia	2024–25	First League	11	2	2	0	–		1	0	14	2
CSKA Sofia	2025–26	First League	5	0	0	0	–		0	0	5	0
CSKA Sofia	Total		16	2	2	0	0	0	1	0	19	2
Cherno More	2026–27	First League	5	0	1	0	–		–		6	0
Career total			150	19	6	2	0	0	1	0	156	21
