= Solet (surname) =

Solet is a surname. Notable people with the surname include:

- Isaac Solet (born 2001), Central African footballer
- Oumar Solet (born 2000), French footballer
- Paul Solet (born 1979), American film director
