= FC Haskovo =

Bulgarian football club

Haskovo 1957
- Full name: Football Club Haskovo 1957
- Founded: 2009; 17 years ago
- Ground: Haskovo Stadium
- Capacity: 9,000
- Chairman: Delcho Korchev
- Manager: Emil Angelov
- League: A RFG Haskovo
- 2023–24: A RFG Haskovo, 2nd
Home colours	Away colours

FC Haskovo 1957 (Bulgarian: ФК Хасково 1957) is a Bulgarian football club based in Haskovo, which currently competes in the A RFG Haskovo, the fourth tier of Bulgarian football. Haskovo's home ground is the Haskovo Stadium, which has a capacity of 9,000 spectators. Haskovo have spent a total of 7 seasons in the Bulgarian elite, most recently in the 2014-15 season.

After the 2020–21 season, FC Haskovo's senior team was merged with FC Izvor Gorski Izvor, which itself was moved to Haskovo to form a new club, called Sayana Haskovo. Sayana took Haskovo's place in the Southeast Third League. The original club was reformed under the name OFC Haskovo.

== History ==
Haskovo crest used until 2009

FC Haskovo was founded in 1947 under the name Dinamo. Before that, there were several smaller football clubs, which decided to unite in 1947 to form a unified team representing the city. The team was an established one in the B PFG, the second division of Bulgarian football, and an almost constant participant in the division for many seasons.

Haskovo made its debut in the A Group during the 1978–79 season, but finished in last place and was relegated immediately. Two years later, Haskovo returned to the top flight, and managed to stay three seasons in the elite, before another relegation in 1984. The team needed six years to return to the A Group, in 1990. Another quick relegation followed, however. After just a season in the B Group, Haskovo again reached the highest tier for the 1992–93 A Group season. The team could not avoid relegation once more though. Overall, Haskovo played in A PFG during five separate periods: 1978–1979, 1981–1984, 1990–1991 and 1992–1993. Its greatest success was 8th in 1981–82 season.

It also played in the Regional League between 2009 and 2012. Haskovo made 3 successive promotions and returned to top level 21 years after their last top flight participation, in 2014.

Their top flight return proved to be difficult. Haskovo only managed to win two games and draw once in the regular season of the 2014-15 season. All seven points came from home games, with no points earned from away games. This placed Haskovo in last place, in the relegation zone. Surprisingly however, Haskovo managed to beat Ludogorets, the three-time defending champions, with a score of 1–0 at Haskovo stadium. In the second phase, Haskovo were prime candidates to be relegated. They managed to beat Lokomotiv Plovdiv, and fellow strugglers Marek at home, as well as drawing against giants Levski, and Slavia. These efforts were however not enough, as the team only managed to obtain 15 points, meaning they were still 17 points behind Lokomotiv Plovdiv, who were the last team to avoid relegation. Thus, Haskovo along with fellow newcomers Marek, were relegated after only one season in the top flight.

Haskovo was supposed to play in B PFG for the 2015–16 season, but they did not obtain a license and decided not to compete. The team disappeared for the next three years, but it was refounded as Haskovo 1957 and started competing in the fourth level of Bulgarian football. The team won the regional A OFG Haskovo league and promoted to the third tier for the 2018–19 season.

Before the start of the 2021-22 season, FC Izvor Gorski Izvor was relocated to the city of Haskovo and was renamed FC Sayana Haskovo. Shortly after that, FC Haskovo was merged into Sayana, to form a new club in Haskovo. The original club was restructured under the name OFC Haskovo, and began competing in the fourth level of Bulgarian football, A RFG Haskovo Province.

== Honours ==
Bulgarian A PFG

- 8th place 1981–82

Bulgarian B Group

- Runners-up: 2013–14

Bulgarian Cup

- Semi-finals (1): 1984

Amateur Football League

- Cup of Amateur Football League in 2005

== Current squad ==
As of 1 August 2019 Note: Flags indicate national team as defined under FIFA eligibility rules; some limited exceptions apply. Players may hold more than one non-FIFA nationality.

No.	Pos.	Nation	Player
1	GK	BUL	Blagoy Makendzhiev
4	DF	BUL	Georgi Pashov
5	DF	ALG	Riyad Belhadj
6	FW	BUL	Ivelin Kostov
7	MF	BUL	Bozhidar Vasev
9	FW	BUL	Petar Prindzhev
10	MF	BUL	Pavel Golovodov
11	MF	BUL	Sami Mehmedov
12	GK	BUL	Yoan Zagorov
17	DF	BUL	Plamen Dimov

No.	Pos.	Nation	Player
18	MF	CRO	Boje Vukoja
19	MF	CUW	Nathan Markelo
20	DF	MKD	Dime Dimov
23	MF	CRO	Robert Marijanovic
24	DF	BUL	Daniel Kirilov
27	DF	BUL	Neliyan Chakarov
28	MF	BUL	Valyo Stoykov
50	DF	BUL	Emilian Angelov
71	MF	BUL	Mario Yovov
77	MF	BUL	Seid Sebat
99	MF	BUL	Soner Polat

== Managers ==
Name	From	To
(Bulgaria) Dimcho Markov	Sep 2011	Mar 2013
(Bulgaria) Hristo Georgiev	Mar 2013	Apr 2013
(Bulgaria) Dimcho Nenov	Apr 2013	Sep 2014
(Bulgaria) Emil Velev	Oct 2014	Mar 2015
(Bulgaria) Stamen Belchev	Mar 2015	
