= Ivelin Kostov =

Bulgarian footballer

Personal information
- Full name: Ivelin Mitkov Kostov
- Date of birth: 29 January 1986 (age 40)
- Place of birth: Bulgaria
- Height: 1.83 m (6 ft 0 in)
- Position: Midfielder

Senior career*
Years	Team	Apps	(Gls)
2004–2006	Beroe Stara Zagora	16	(0)
2006–2008	Lokomotiv Stara Zagora	10	(0)
2008–2009	Dorostol Silistra		
2009–2011	Dobrudzha Dobrich	40	(6)
2011	Sliven 2000	14	(1)
2012–2013	Kaliakra Kavarna	37	(0)
2013	Orlicz Suchedniów		
2014	Calisia Kalisz	15	(7)
2014	Chernomorets Balchik		
2015–2017	KKS 1925 Kalisz	51	(7)
2017–2019	Levski Karlovo		
2019–2020	Haskovo		
- * Club domestic league appearances and goals

Ivelin Kostov (Bulgarian: Ивелин Костов) (born 29 January 1986) is a Bulgarian former professional footballer who played as a midfielder.
