= Martin Stoychev =

Bulgarian football player (born 2006)

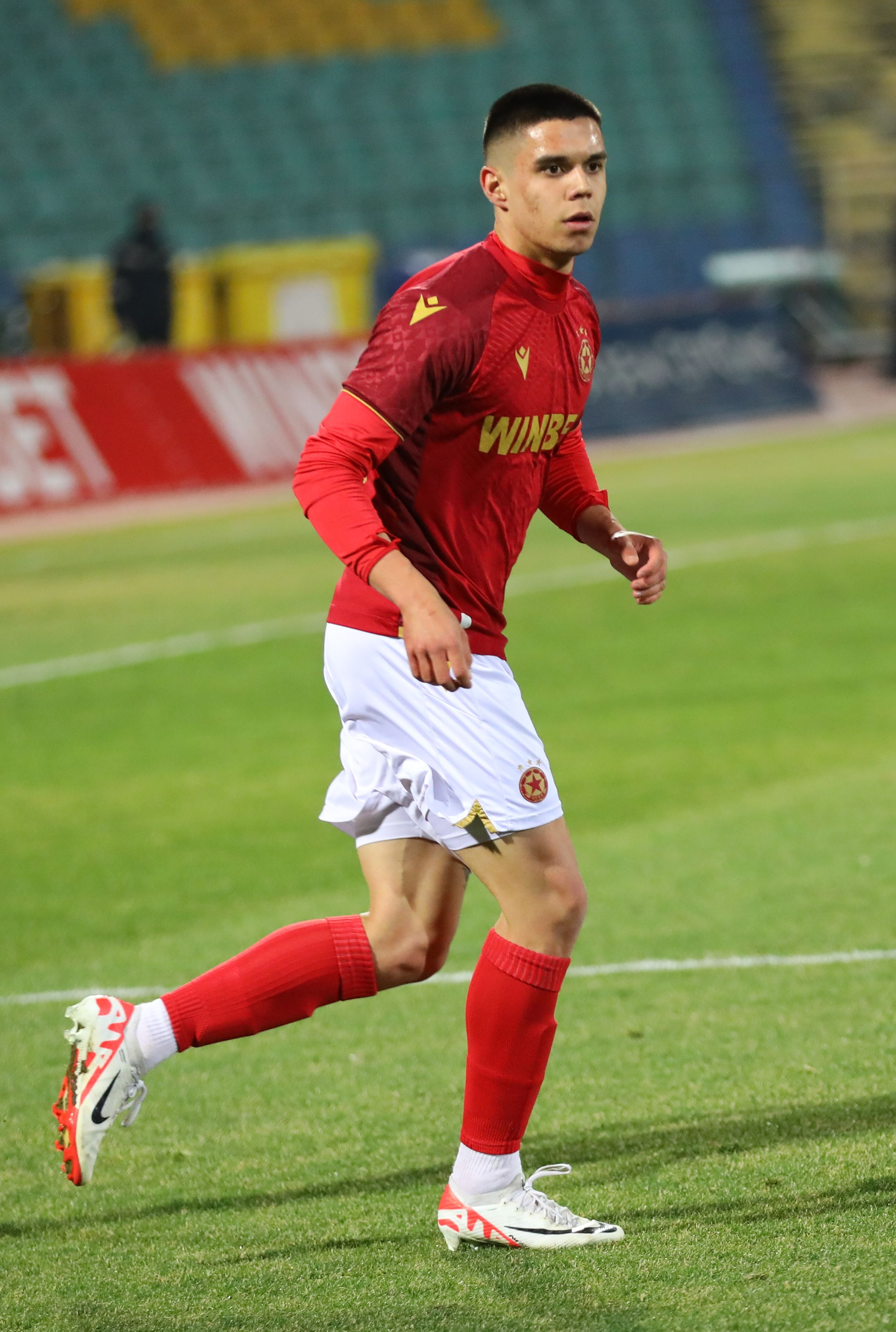
- Stoychev in 2024

Personal information
- Full name: Martin Plamenov Stoychev
- Date of birth: 17 October 2003 (age 23)
- Place of birth: Dragoman, Bulgaria
- Height: 1.78 m (5 ft 10 in)
- Position: Right back

Team information
- Current team: CSKA Sofia II
- Number: 20

Youth career
- 2011–2018: FC Dragoman
- 2018–2023: Septemvri Sofia

Senior career*
Years	Team	Apps	(Gls)
2020–2024	Septemvri Sofia	45	(2)
2023–2024	→ Arda Kardzhali (loan)	19	(0)
2024–	CSKA Sofia	6	(0)
2025–	CSKA Sofia II	24	(4)
2026	→ Botev Vratsa (loan)	9	(0)

International career^{‡}
2021–2023	Bulgaria U19	7	(0)
2022–	Bulgaria U21	7	(0)
- * Club domestic league appearances and goals as of 19:14, 16 November 2026 (UTC) ‡ National team caps and goals as of 03:49, 12 September 2024 (UTC)

Martin Plamenov Stoychev (Bulgarian: Мартин Стойчев; born 17 October 2003) is a Bulgarian professional footballer who plays as a right back for CSKA Sofia.

== Career ==
Stoychev began his career in the local FC Dragoman at the age of 11, before moving to Septemvri Sofia academy in 2018. He made his professional debut for the club in 2020 on his 17th birthday, in a league match against Litex Lovech. On 17 October 2022, in a league match against Levski Sofia, he received an injury that ruled him out until end of the season. Ironically, before this, Levski had contacted him and expressed a desire to sign him during the winter break, but the transfer failed. After Septemvri were relegated to the Second League, in July 2023 he signed a year-long loan deal with First League team Arda Kardzhali.

== Career statistics ==
=== Club ===
As of 15 November 2026

Club performance			League		Cup		Continental		Other		Total	
Club	League	Season	Apps	Goals	Apps	Goals	Apps	Goals	Apps	Goals	Apps	Goals
Bulgaria			League		Bulgarian Cup		Europe		Other (Note: Includes Promotion/relegation play-off matches.)		Total	
Septemvri Sofia	Second League	2020–21	5	0	0	0	–		0	0	5	0
Septemvri Sofia	Second League	2021–22	26	0	3	0	–		–		29	0
Septemvri Sofia	First League	2022–23	14	0	0	0	–		–		14	0
Septemvri Sofia	Total		45	0	3	0	0	0	0	0	48	0
Arda Kardzhali (loan)	First League	2023–24	19	0	0	0	–		0	0	19	0
CSKA Sofia	First League	2023–24	4	0	1	0	–		–		5	0
CSKA Sofia	First League	2024–25	0	0	0	0	–		0	0	0	0
CSKA Sofia	First League	2025–26	2	0	1	0	–		0	0	3	0
CSKA Sofia	Total		6	0	2	0	0	0	0	0	8	0
CSKA Sofia II	Second League	2024–25	4	0	–		–		–		4	0
CSKA Sofia II	Second League	2025–26	7	0	–		–		–		7	0
CSKA Sofia II	Second League	2026–27	13	4	–		–		–		13	4
CSKA Sofia II	Total		24	4	0	0	0	0	0	0	24	4
Botev Vratsa (loan)	First League	2025–26	9	0	1	0	–		–		10	0
Career statistics			103	4	6	0	0	0	0	0	109	4
