= Tamimou Ouorou =

Beninese footballer (born 2003)

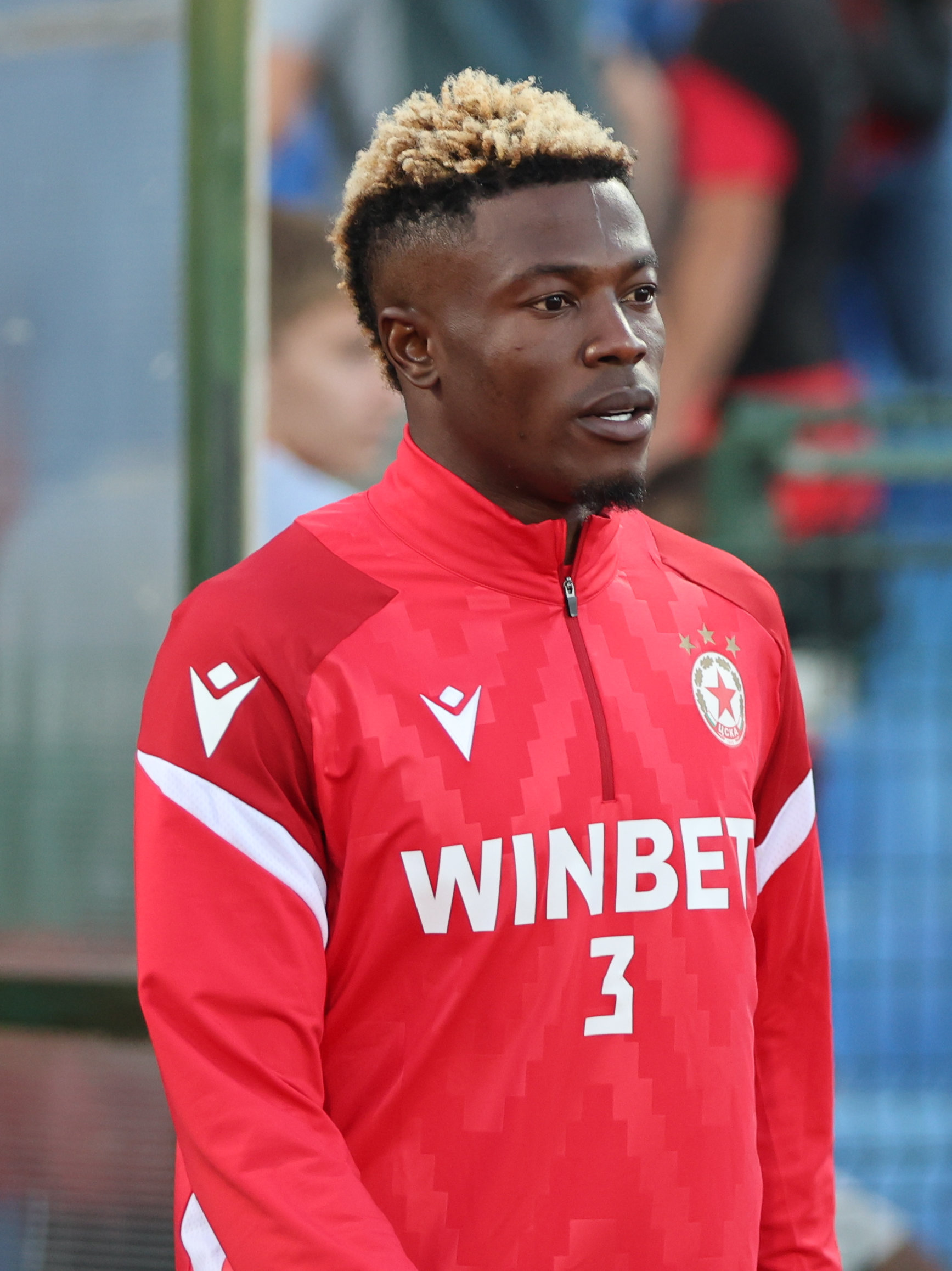
- Ouorou in 2026

Personal information
- Date of birth: 3 May 2003 (age 23)
- Place of birth: Djougou, Benin
- Height: 1.76 m (5 ft 9 in)
- Position: Defender

Team information
- Current team: CSKA Sofia (on loan from Botev Vratsa)
- Number: 3

Senior career*
Years	Team	Apps	(Gls)
–2022	ASPAC		
2022	FC Gagra	8	(0)
2023–2024	Hatta Club	15	(0)
2025–2026	AS Sobemap		
2026–	Botev Vratsa	7	(1)
2026–	→ CSKA Sofia (loan)	2	(0)

International career^{‡}
2023	Benin U20	4	(0)
2023–	Benin	19	(0)
- * Club domestic league appearances and goals as of 16:37, 8 November 2026 (UTC) ‡ National team caps and goals as of 18:10, 2 October 2026 (UTC)

Tamimou Ouorou (born 3 May 2003) is a Beninese professional footballer who plays as a defender for Bulgarian First League club CSKA Sofia on loan from Botev Vratsa and for the Benin national team.

== Club career ==
Ouorou began his professional career in Benin with ASPAC, where he made his first notable appearances as a young defender, gradually attracting the attention of foreign clubs.

In 2022, Ouorou signed with Gagra in Georgia, where he made his European debut and participated in several league matches before his contract came to an end.

In 2023, the player signed with Hatta Club in the United Arab Emirates, where he played for two seasons as a regular starter, establishing himself within the squad despite the club's relegation to a lower division.

During the summer 2025 transfer window, Ligue 1 clubs such as Le Havre and Lens closely monitored Ouorou, attracted by his versatile defensive profile and potential at the European level. Several Turkish clubs, including Göztepe and Gaziantep, also expressed interest in the player.

Following administrative and financial constraints that delayed a move to Europe, Ouorou returned to Benin and signed with AS Sobemap at the end of November 2025, with the aim of regaining playing time and relaunching his career on the international stage.

On 17 February 2026, Woru signed a contract with Botev Vratsa of the Bulgarian First League. On 3 July 2026, he joined fellow Bulgarian club CSKA Sofia on loan, with an option to make the move permanent.

== International career ==
Ouorou is a Benin international. He was called up to the Benin national under-20 football team by Mathias Déguénon for the 2023 U-20 Africa Cup of Nations.

He made his senior debut for the Benin national team in 2023 and gradually established himself as a regular starter, representing Benin in qualifying matches and international friendlies and consolidating his place in the national squad. He was selected for Benin's squad for the 2025 Africa Cup of Nations, held in Morocco, as one of the defenders chosen by the coaching staff for the tournament. During the competition, Ouorou played as a versatile defender, contributing to the team's defensive organization and featuring in matches against some of Africa's strongest national teams.

During the group stage, Ouorou started in Benin's 3–0 defeat to Senegal, playing in defense before being substituted late in the match. He also started in the match against the DR Congo, which Benin lost 1–0. In the round of 16, Ouorou was named in the starting lineup against Egypt. The match ended in a 3–1 defeat for Benin after extra time.

== Career statistics ==
=== Club ===
As of 8 November 2026

Appearances and goals by club, season and competition
Club	Season	League			National cup		League cup		Continental		Other		Total	
Club	Season	Division	Apps	Goals	Apps	Goals	Apps	Goals	Apps	Goals	Apps	Goals	Apps	Goals
FC Gagra	2022	Erovnuli Liga	8	0	0	0	–		–		0	0	0	0
Hatta Club	2023–24	UAE Pro League	15	0	0	0	2	0	–		1	0	18	0
Hatta Club	2024–25	UAE Pro League	0	0	0	0	0	0	–		3	0	3	0
Hatta Club	Total		8	0	0	0	2	0	0	0	4	0	22	0
Botev Vratsa	2025–26	Bulgarian First League	7	1	0	0	–		–		–		7	1
CSKA Sofia (loan)	2026–27	Bulgarian First League	2	0	0	0	–		2	0	0	0	4	0
Career total			32	1	0	0	2	0	2	0	4	0	40	1

=== International ===
As of match played on 29 September 2026

National team	Year	Apps	Goals
Benin
Benin	2023	1	0
Benin	2024	2	0
Benin	2025	10	0
Benin	2026	6	0
Total		19	0
