= Stamen Belchev =

Bulgarian footballer and manager

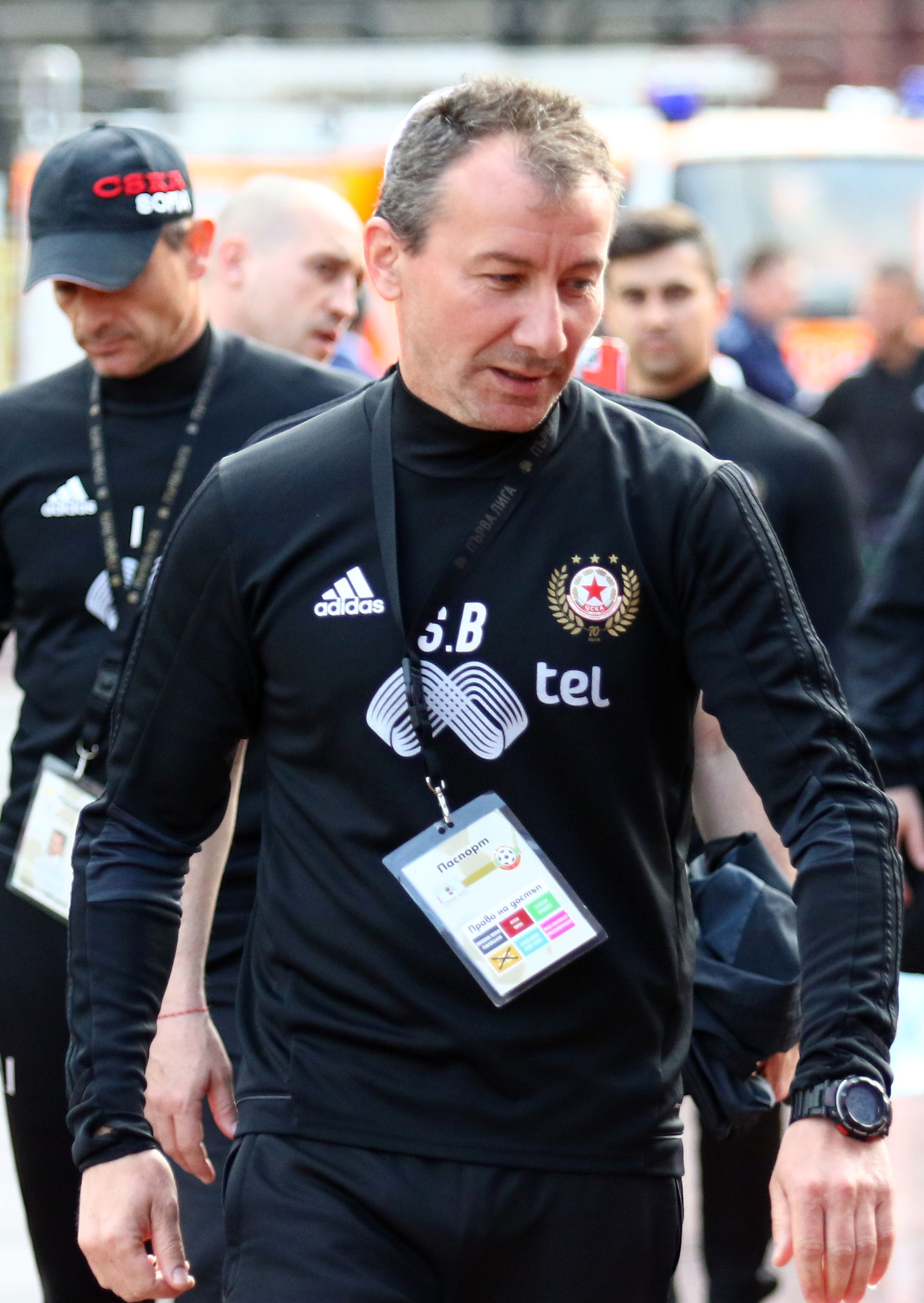

Personal information
- Full name: Stamen Dimitrov Belchev
- Date of birth: 7 May 1969 (age 57)
- Place of birth: Haskovo, Bulgaria
- Position: Forward

Senior career*
| Years | Team | Apps | (Gls) |
| 1988–1994 | Haskovo | 151 | (47) |
| 1994–1996 | Lokomotiv GO | 77 | (15) |
| 1997 | Etar Veliko Tarnovo | 12 | (1) |
| 1997–2002 | Haskovo | 104 | (36) |
| 2000 | → Beroe (loan) | 7 | (0) |
| Total | | 351 | (99) |

Managerial career
- 2010–2012: Lyubimets
- 2015: Haskovo
- 2015–2016: Litex Lovech II
- 2016: Litex Lovech
- 2016: CSKA Sofia II
- 2016–2018: CSKA Sofia
- 2019–2020: Arda Kardzhali
- 2020: CSKA Sofia
- 2021–2022: Arda Kardzhali
- 2022–2024: CSKA Sofia II
- 2024: CSKA Sofia
- 2025: Septemvri Sofia
- * Club domestic league appearances and goals

Stamen Belchev (Bulgarian: Стамен Белчев; born 7 May 1969) is a former Bulgarian footballer and football manager.

== Career ==
=== Manager career ===
In March 2015, Belchev was appointed as manager of his hometown club Haskovo, succeeding Emil Velev. He was manager until the end of the season. Later, on July 13, 2015, he was announced as manager of Litex Lovech II, the reserve team of former Bulgarian champions Litex Lovech which competed in B Group, the second level of Bulgarian football.

On 27 November 2016, following the resignation of Edward Iordănescu, Belchev was appointed as interim manager of CSKA Sofia. On 3 January 2017 he was appointed as a permanent manager of the team, signing a contract until the end of the season. In early June 2017, it was announced that Belchev would remain as manager for the next season.

On 6 March 2019 Stamen Belchev was appointed as the new manager of Arda Kardzhali, after Stoev was signed with the Bulgarian champions Ludogorets Razgrad. After a successful period that culminated in the team's first ever promotion to the top flight of Bulgarian football, he parted ways with the club by mutual consent in April 2020. In June 2025 he was announced as the manager of Septemvri Sofia.

== Managerial statistics ==
As of 1 May 2018

| Team | From | To | Record | | | | | | | |
| Team | From | To | G | W | D | L | Win % | GF | GA | GD |
|---|---|---|---|---|---|---|---|---|---|---|
| Haskovo | 27 March 2015 | 30 June 2015 | 9 | 2 | 1 | 6 | 22.22 | 5 | 18 | –13 |
| Litex Lovech II | 30 July 2015 | 1 February 2016 | 17 | 4 | 4 | 9 | 23.53 | 18 | 30 | –12 |
| CSKA Sofia II | 30 July 2016 | 29 November 2016 | 13 | 7 | 3 | 3 | 53.85 | 24 | 17 | +8 |
| CSKA Sofia | 29 November 2016 | 1 May 2018 | 58 | 36 | 15 | 7 | 62.07 | 115 | 42 | +73 |
| Total | | | 97 | 49 | 23 | 25 | 50.52 | 162 | 107 | +55 |

== Honours ==
- 3rd place in the football manager of the year in Bulgaria ranking - 2017.
