= Dimcho Markov =

Bulgarian footballer and manager

Personal information
- Full name: Dimcho Ivanov Markov
- Date of birth: 12 November 1965 (age 60)
- Place of birth: Bulgaria
- Position: Defender

Senior career*
| Years | Team | Apps | (Gls) |
| 1983–1991 | Haskovo | 205 | (7) |
| 1991–1994 | Lokomotiv GO | 66 | (2) |
| 1994–1995 | Lokomotiv Plovdiv | 42 | (0) |
| 1996 | Levski Sofia | 13 | (0) |
| 1997 | Lokomotiv Plovdiv | 7 | (0) |
| 1997–2001 | Haskovo | | |

Managerial career
- 2001–2003: Haskovo
- 2003–2006: Hebros Harmanli
- 2006–2009: Lyubimets 2007
- 2009–2011: Botev Galabovo
- 2011–2013: Haskovo
- 2013–2014: Botev Galabovo
- 2016: Botev Galabovo
- * Club domestic league appearances and goals

Dimcho Ivanov Markov (Bulgarian: Димчо Иванов Марков; born 12 November 1965) is a former Bulgarian footballer and currently manager.
