= Mark-Emilio Papazov =

Bulgarian footballer

Personal information
- Full name: Mark-Emilio Ivanov Papazov
- Date of birth: 8 October 2003 (age 23)
- Place of birth: Sofia, Bulgaria
- Height: 1.87 m (6 ft 2 in)
- Positions: Striker; winger

Team information
- Current team: Lokomotiv Sofia
- Number: 17

Youth career
- 2010–2016: Levski Sofia
- 2016: Pescara
- 2016–2018: Levski Sofia
- 2018–2021: CSKA Sofia

Senior career*
Years	Team	Apps	(Gls)
2019–2026	CSKA Sofia	6	(0)
2021–2022	→ Litex Lovech (loan)	35	(6)
2022–2026	CSKA Sofia II	69	(40)
2023	→ Hebar Pazardzhik (loan)	13	(2)
2024	→ Hebar Pazardzhik (loan)	15	(3)
2025	→ Botev Vratsa (loan)	13	(0)
2026–	Lokomotiv Sofia	3	(0)

International career^{‡}
2019–2020	Bulgaria U17	3	(2)
2021–2022	Bulgaria U19	5	(2)
2022–2023	Bulgaria U21	5	(0)
- * Club domestic league appearances and goals as of 17:49, 2 August 2026 (UTC) ‡ National team caps and goals as of 16:41, 20 March 2023 (UTC)

Mark-Emilio Ivanov Papazov (Bulgarian: Марк-Емилио Иванов Папазов; born 8 October 2003) is a Bulgarian professional footballer who plays as a striker for First League club Lokomotiv Sofia.

== Career ==
As a youth player, he joined the youth academy of Levski Sofia. In 2016, he joined the youth academy of Pescara. In 2018, he joined the youth academy of CSKA Sofia.

Papazov started his senior career with CSKA Sofia. He also played for CSKA Sofia II. Papazov completed his league debut for CSKA Sofia on 10 July 2022 in a match against Arda Kardzhali. On 12 January 2023 he was sent on loan to Hebar Pazardzhik for the rest of the season. Papazov made his debut for the team in a league match on 11 February against CSKA 1948. In 2023, he renewed his contract until 2026.

== International career ==
On 18 March 2023, he was called up for the Bulgaria U21 for the friendly tournament Antalya Cup between 25 and 28 March 2023.

== Career statistics ==
=== Club ===
As of 31 July 2026

Club	Season	Division	League		Cup		Europe		Other		Total	
Club	Season	Division	Apps	Goals	Apps	Goals	Apps	Goals	Apps	Goals	Apps	Goals
CSKA Sofia	First League	2019–20	0	0	0	0	0	0	–		0	0
CSKA Sofia	First League	2022–23	1	0	0	0	0	0	–		1	0
CSKA Sofia	First League	2023–24	3	0	0	0	0	0	–		3	0
CSKA Sofia	First League	2024–25	2	0	0	0	–		–		2	0
CSKA Sofia	Total		6	0	0	0	0	0	0	0	6	0
Litex Lovech (loan)	Second League	2021–22	35	6	0	0	–		–		35	6
CSKA Sofia II	Third League	2022–23	8	6	–		–		–		8	6
CSKA Sofia II	Third League	2023–24	13	10	–		–		–		13	10
CSKA Sofia II	Second League	2024–25	19	6	–		–		–		19	6
CSKA Sofia II	Second League	2025–26	29	18	–		–		–		29	18
CSKA Sofia II	Total		69	40	0	0	0	0	0	0	69	40
Hebar Pazardzhik (loan)	First League	2022–23	13	2	0	0	–		–		13	2
Hebar Pazardzhik (loan)	First League	2023–24	15	3	2	0	–		–		17	3
Hebar Pazardzhik (loan)	Total		28	5	2	0	0	0	0	0	30	5
Botev Vratsa (loan)	First League	2024–25	13	0	3	0	–		0	0	16	0
Lokomotiv Sofia	First League	2026–27	3	0	0	0	–		–		3	0
Career total			154	51	5	0	0	0	0	0	159	51
