= Facundo Rodríguez (footballer, born 2000) =

Argentine footballer

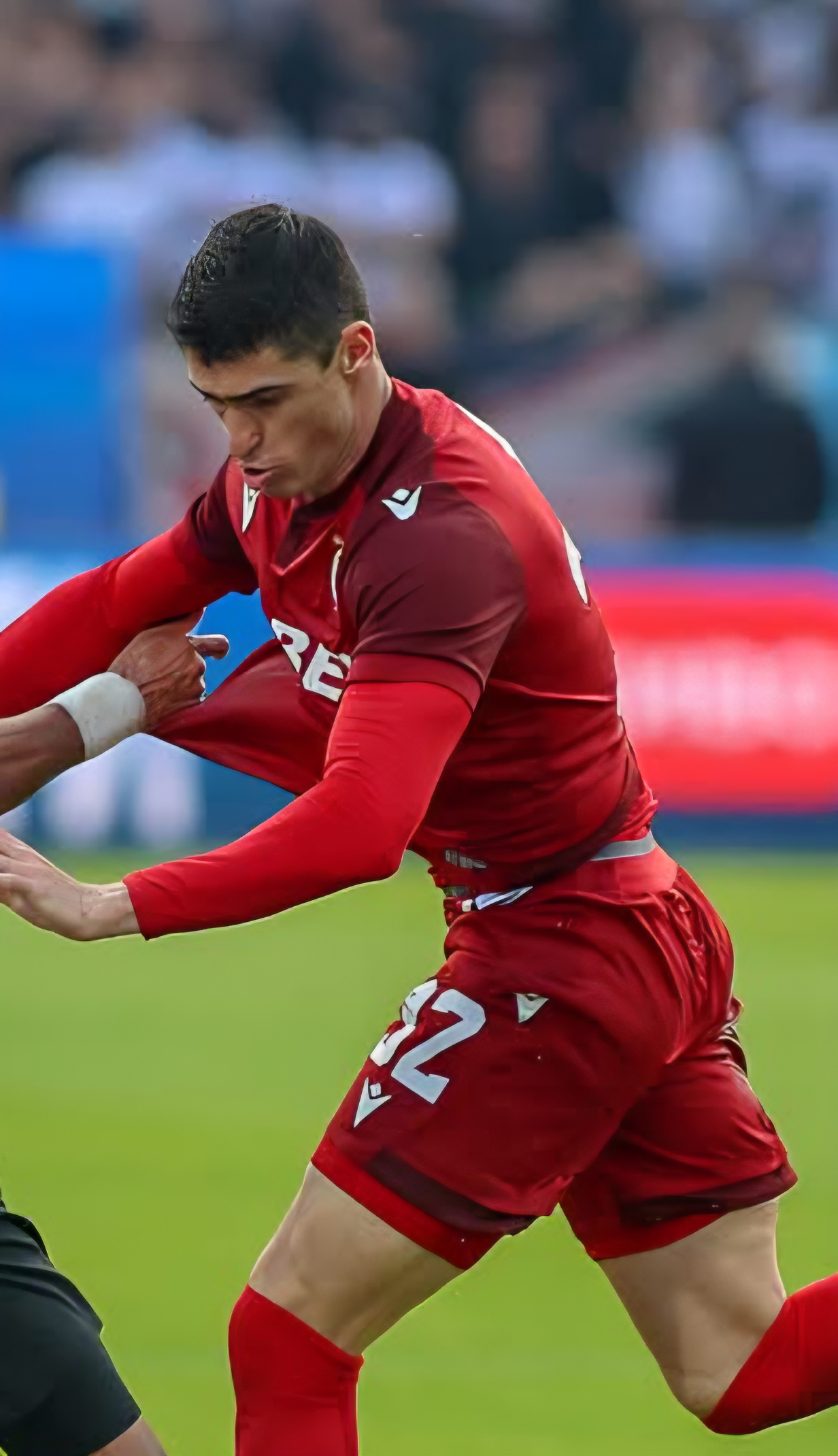

Personal information
- Date of birth: 26 February 2000 (age 26)
- Place of birth: San Martín, Argentina
- Height: 1.90 m (6 ft 3 in)
- Position: Centre-back

Team information
- Current team: CSKA Sofia (on loan from Estudiantes)
- Number: 32

Youth career
- Godoy Cruz

Senior career*
Years	Team	Apps	(Gls)
2019–2022	Godoy Cruz	2	(0)
2021	→ Temperley (loan)	12	(0)
2022–2023	Guillermo Brown	28	(2)
2023–2024	LDU Quito	37	(1)
2024–	Estudiantes	42	(1)
2026–	→ CSKA Sofia (loan)	22	(1)
- * Club domestic league appearances and goals as of 18:01, 22 November 2026 (UTC)

Facundo Rodríguez (born 26 February 2000) is an Argentine professional footballer who plays as a centre-back for Bulgarian First League club CSKA Sofia on loan from Estudiantes.

== Club career ==
Rodríguez's career began with Godoy Cruz. He was selected for his professional debut on 30 March 2019, with Lucas Bernardi picking him to start a 2–1 victory over Patronato at the Estadio Malvinas Argentinas.

In January 2022, Rodríguez joined Guillermo Brown.

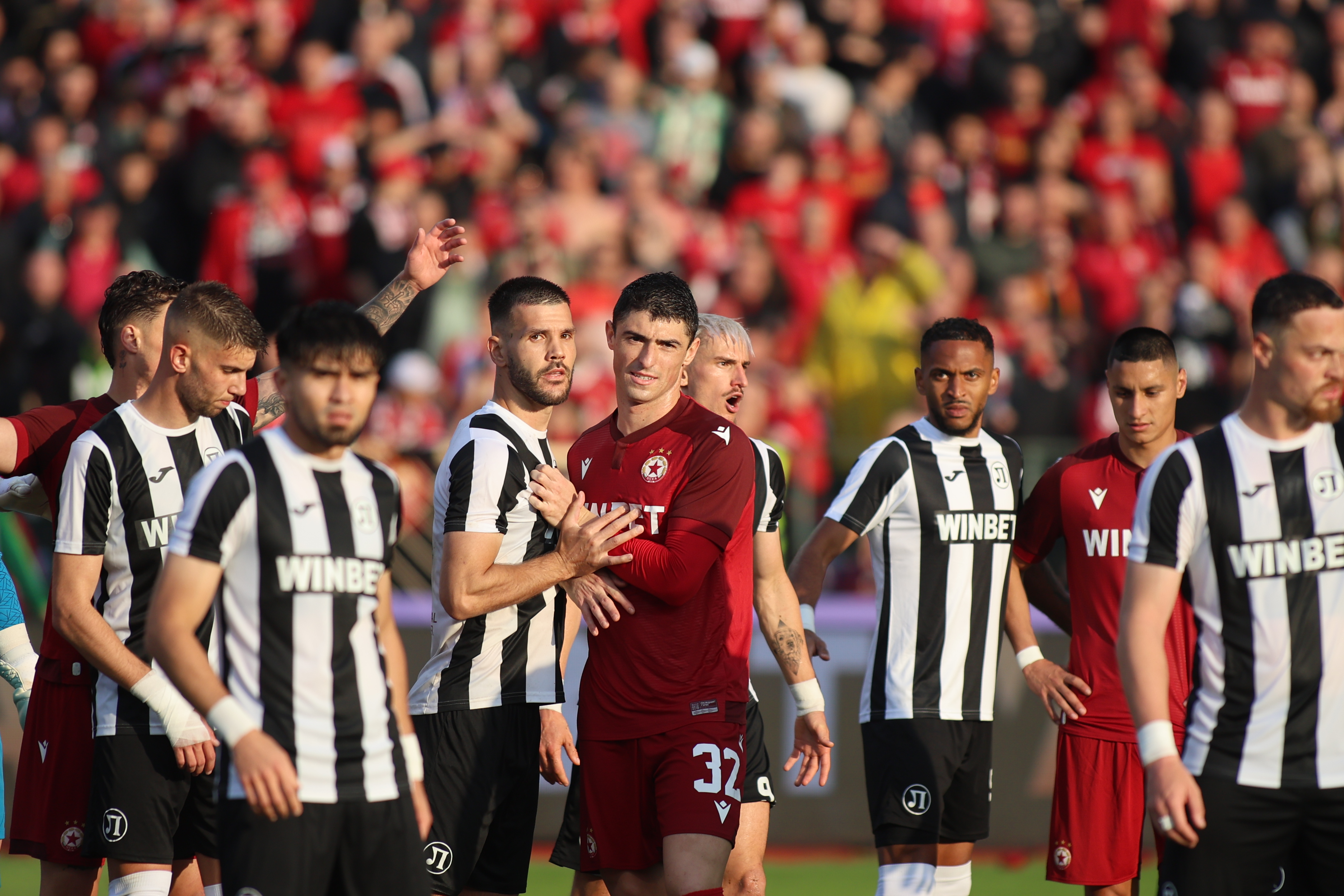
Rodríguez (32) in action, a moment from the Bulgarian Cup final PFC CSKA Sofia - PFC Lokomotiv Plovdiv, May 20, 2026.

== International career ==
In February 2018, Rodríguez received a call-up for training with the Argentina U19s.

== Career statistics ==
As of 22 November 2026.

Appearances and goals by club, season and competition
Club	Season	League			Cup		Continental		Other		Total	
Club	Season	Division	Apps	Goals	Apps	Goals	Apps	Goals	Apps	Goals	Apps	Goals
Godoy Cruz	2018–19	Primera División	2	0	0	0	0	0	1 (Note: Appearances in the Copa de la Superliga)	0	3	0
Temperley	2020	Primera Nacional	0	0	2 (Note: Appearances in the Copa Argentina)	0	0	0	0	0	2	0
Temperley	2021	Primera Nacional	12	0	0	0	0	0	0	0	12	0
Temperley	Total		12	0	2	0	0	0	0	0	14	0
Guillermo Brown	2022	Primera Nacional	28	2	0	0	0	0	0	0	28	2
L.D.U. Quito	2023	LigaPro	26	1	0	0	11 (Note: Appearances in the Copa Sudamericana)	1	0	0	37	2
L.D.U. Quito	2024	LigaPro	11	0	0	0	5 (Note: Appearances in the Copa Libertadores)	0	0	0	16	0
L.D.U. Quito	Total		37	1	0	0	16	1	0	0	53	2
Estudiantes	2024	Primera División	14	1	0	0	0	0	0	0	14	1
Estudiantes	2025	Primera División	28	0	2	0	9	0	2	0	41	0
Estudiantes	2026	Primera División	0	0	1	0	0	0	0	0	1	0
Estudiantes	Total		42	1	3	0	9	0	2	0	56	1
CSKA Sofia (loan)	2025–26	Bulgarian First League	11	0	3	0	–		–		14	0
CSKA Sofia (loan)	2026–27	Bulgarian First League	11	1	1	0	9	0	1	0	22	1
CSKA Sofia (loan)	Total		22	1	4	0	9	0	1	0	36	1
Career total			143	4	9	0	34	1	4	0	190	5

== Honours ==
Liga de Quito

- Ecuadorian Serie A: 2023
- Copa Sudamericana: 2023

Estudiantes

- Trofeo de Campeones de la Liga Profesional: 2024, 2025
- Primera División: 2025 Clausura

CSKA Sofia

- Bulgarian Cup: 2025-26
- Bulgarian Supercup: 2026
