= Isaac Solet =

Central African footballer (born 2001)

Personal information
- Full name: Isaac Solet Bomawoko
- Date of birth: 16 June 2001 (age 25)
- Place of birth: Melun, France
- Height: 1.84 m (6 ft 0 in)
- Position: Defensive midfielder

Team information
- Current team: CSKA Sofia
- Number: 94

Youth career
- 2008–2009: Dammarie-les-Lys FC
- 2009–2013: Créteil
- 2013–2016: US Villejuif
- 2016–2018: Laval

Senior career*
Years	Team	Apps	(Gls)
2018–2019	Laval II	7	(0)
2019–2021	Reims II	10	(1)
2021–2022	Paris FC II	3	(0)
2022–2023	Poissy	14	(0)
2023–2024	Progresul Spartac	10	(2)
2024–2026	Slavia Sofia	17	(3)
2024–2025	→ Göztepe (loan)	11	(2)
2026–	CSKA Sofia	22	(1)

International career^{‡}
2017	France U17	1	(0)
2023–	Central African Republic	14	(0)
- * Club domestic league appearances and goals as of 19:19, 31 October 2026 (UTC) ‡ National team caps and goals as of 18:03, 2 October 2026 (UTC)

Isaac Solet Bomawoko (born 16 June 2001) is a professional footballer who plays as a defensive midfielder or centre-back for Bulgarian First League side CSKA Sofia. Born in France, he plays for the Central African Republic national team.

== Club career ==
Solet, who started his professional career with Laval II, was transferred to Reims II on January 31, 2019.

Solet joined Bulgarian club Slavia Sofia in February 2023.

Solet was transferred to Super League team Göztepe on loan with an option to buy, on 26 June 2024. He made his debut for Göztepe against Antalyaspor on 10 August 2024.

== International career ==
Solet made his debut for the senior Central African Republic national team on 17 November 2023 in a World Cup qualifier against the Comoros.

== Career statistics ==
=== Club ===
As of 5 November 2026

Club	Division	Season	League		Cup		Continental		Other		Total	
Club	Division	Season	Apps	Goals	Apps	Goals	Apps	Goals	Apps	Goals	Apps	Goals
Laval II	Championnat National 3	2018–19	7	0	—		—		—		7	0
Reims II	Championnat National 2	2018–19	4	0	—		—		—		4	0
Reims II	Championnat National 2	2019–20	4	1	—		—		—		4	1
Reims II	Championnat National 2	2020–21	2	0	—		—		—		2	0
Reims II	Total		10	1	0	0	0	0	0	0	10	1
Paris FC II	Championnat National 3	2021–22	3	0	—		—		—		3	0
Poissy	Championnat National 2	2022–23	14	0	1	0	—		—		15	0
Progresul Spartac	Liga II	2023–24	10	2	—		—		—		10	2
Slavia Sofia	First League	2023–24	11	0	—		—		—		11	0
Slavia Sofia	First League	2023–24	6	3	1	0	—		—		7	3
Slavia Sofia	Total		17	3	1	0	0	0	0	0	18	3
Göztepe (loan)	Süper Lig	2024–25	11	2	—		—		—		11	2
CSKA Sofia	First League	2025–26	14	0	1	0	—		—		15	0
CSKA Sofia	First League	2026–27	8	1	1	0	7	0	0	0	16	1
CSKA Sofia	Total		22	1	2	0	7	0	0	0	31	1
Career total			94	7	4	0	7	0	0	0	105	7

=== International ===
As of match played 29 September 2026

Appearances and goals by national team and year
National team	Year	Apps	Goals
Central African Republic
Central African Republic	2023	2	0
Central African Republic	2024	10	0
Central African Republic	2026	2	0
Total		14	0

== Personal life ==
Born in France, Soulet is of Central African and Ivorian descent. He is the younger brother of Oumar Solet.
