= PFC CSKA Sofia Sports Complex =

Sporting venue in Bulgaria

CSKA Sofia Sports Complex
- Interactive map of CSKA Sofia Sports Complex
- Location: Pancharevo, Sofia Municipality, Bulgaria
- Coordinates: 42°36′39.7″N 23°23′35.7″E
- Owner: Ministry of Physical Education and Sport
- Operator: CSKA Sofia
- Capacity: 1,500
- Type: Football training ground
- Surface: Grass
- Field size: 105 m × 68 m

Construction
- Groundbreaking: 19 September 2016
- Built: 1950s (as Sports Training Base Pancharevo)
- Opened: 1 July 2017 (as CSKA Sofia Sports Complex)
- Renovated: 2016–2018, 2025–2026

Tenants
- CSKA Sofia, CSKA Sofia II

CSKA Sofia Sports Complex (Bulgarian: Спортен кoмплекс „ЦСКА София“) also known as Pancharevo (Bulgarian: „Панчарево“) is a football complex located in the neighbourhood of Pancharevo in the capital Sofia, Bulgaria.

The complex is situated on the surface of 97,422 square metres, in the west part of Sofia Municipality in the lower parts of Vitosha Mountain. It is the home training base of CSKA Sofia's youth academies, as well as the main squad.

From here was started many Bulgarian great footballers like Hristo Stoichkov, Lyuboslav Penev, Dimitar Berbatov, Martin Petrov, Emil Kostadinov, Ivan Zafirov and others.

== History ==
Training base was built in the 1960s and functioned until the early 2000s, before being abandoned until 2015.

In April 2005, CSKA Sofia, who used the facility, presented a plan for the modernization of the Bulgarian Army Stadium, Sports Complex Red Flag and Pancharevo Sports Complex. The plan envisages the complete demolition of the current stadium and the creation of a new modern stadium with a capacity of 30,000 worth around 50 million euros. It has to be built for 4 years. The project never started because of the financial problems of the former owners.

Before on the base there was a shooting complex, but today it is used only for football.

On 4 January 2018, the club officially signed a contract with Ministry of Physical Education and Sport for the stadium and Pancharevo Training Base.

== Facilities ==
At present, the complex has three fields with natural grass which were built in 2016, two of them are with floodlight. The base has completely new stand with a seating capacity of 1,500 spectators, 30 bungalows for first-team players and staff, fully restored locker rooms, parking, restaurant and common parts.

== Future ==
Sports complex is in the process of a complete reconstruction, which is carried out by CSKA Sofia and after its completion will have a total of five terrains as well as the most modern conditions for restoration and preparation of the competitors.

It will also have a covered mid-size field, fitness center with gym, physio and spa facilities for recreation and modern medical center. A hotel for the youth academy of the club is in process of project.
