= Plamen Dimov =

Plamen Dimov may refer to:

- Plamen Dimov (footballer)
- Plamen Dimov (musician)
