= PFC CSKA Sofia II =

Bulgarian football club

- Full name: Professional Football Club CSKA Sofia II
- Nicknames: The Reds; The Armymen
- Short name: CSKA II
- Founded: 5 May 1948; 78 years ago
- Ground: CSKA Sofia Sports Complex, Pancharevo
- Capacity: 1,500
- Shareholders: Valter Papazki
- Manager: Lyuben Lyubenov
- League: Second League
- 2025–26: Second League, 5th of 20
- Website: cska.bg
Home colours	Away colours	Third colours

CSKA II (Bulgarian: ЦСКА II) is a Bulgarian football team based in Sofia. Founded in 2016, it is the reserve team of CSKA Sofia, and played one season in the Second League, the second level of Bulgarian football in 2016-2017 and being restored in 2022 to play in the Third League.

Because of BFU regulations, CSKA II is ineligible for promotion to the First League and can not participate in the Bulgarian Cup.

== History ==
In June 2016 CSKA II took the place of Litex Lovech II in the Bulgarian Second League. The team was selected by CSKA and Litex youth players. After Stamen Belchev took charge of the first team CSKA II's results worsened, and the team was relegated to South-West Third League on the final day of the season following a 1–2 away defeat by Vitosha Bistritsa. On 5 June 2017, the owners officially informed the Bulgarian Football Union that the team will not participate in the 2017–18 South-West Third League as the level was deemed too low for youth players' development. On 6 June 2017, the contract of the head coach Svetoslav Todorov was terminated.

In end of May 2022, CSKA announced that they will restore the second team and join Third League for the 2022/23 season.

In 2024/2025 season, CSKA II returned to the second tier of Bulgarian football.

== Squad ==
As of 21 September 2026

Note: Flags indicate national team as defined under FIFA eligibility rules; some limited exceptions apply. Players may hold more than one non-FIFA nationality.

No.	Pos.	Nation	Player
2	DF	BUL	Svetozar Evtov
3	DF	BUL	Lachezar Ivanov
4	DF	BUL	Simeon Chatov
5	DF	BUL	Dimitar Hristov
6	MF	BUL	Martin Sotirov
7	FW	BUL	Martin Sorakov
9	FW	BUL	Aleksandar Georgiev
10	FW	BUL	Radoslav Zhivkov (captain)
12	GK	BUL	Martin Kaishev
14	DF	BUL	Iliyan Dimitrov
17	MF	BUL	Teodor Apostolov
18	FW	BUL	Lyubomir Kostov

No.	Pos.	Nation	Player
20	DF	BUL	Martin Stoychev
21	DF	BUL	Veselin Bachev
22	MF	BUL	Radostin Georgiev
27	FW	BUL	Kaloyan Pulev
32	FW	BUL	Konstantin Yordanov
35	MF	BUL	Georgi Yomov
44	DF	BUL	Dimitar Nikolov
47	MF	BUL	Alesandro Nikolov
77	FW	BUL	Yulian Gilov
88	FW	BUL	Emil Naydenov
98	DF	BUL	Bozhidar Petrov
99	GK	BUL	Georgi Gerginov

For recent transfers, see Transfers summer 2026.

For first team players, see CSKA Sofia.

=== From first team ===
Note: Flags indicate national team as defined under FIFA eligibility rules; some limited exceptions apply. Players may hold more than one non-FIFA nationality.

No.	Pos.	Nation	Player
1	GK	BUL	Daniel Nikolov
11	FW	BUL	Vasil Kaymakanov

No.	Pos.	Nation	Player
15	DF	BUL	Aleks Tunchev
80	MF	BUL	Georgi Chorbadzhiyski

== Manager history ==
Dates	Name	Honours
1981–1984	(Bulgaria) Kiril Stankov	1 Bulgarian V Group
2016	(Bulgaria) Stamen Belchev	
2016	(Bulgaria) Ivaylo Stanev /caretaker/	
2017	(Bulgaria) Svetoslav Todorov	
2022–2024	(Bulgaria) Stamen Belchev	
2024	(Bulgaria) Stoyan Angelov	
2024–2025	(Bulgaria) Vladimir Manchev	
2025	(Bulgaria) Valentin Iliev	
2025	(Brazil) (Bulgaria) Daniel Morales /caretaker/	
2025–2026	(Bulgaria) Valentin Iliev	
2026–	(Bulgaria) Lyuben Lyubenov	

== Club officials ==
=== Current technical body ===
Name	Role
(Bulgaria) Valentin Iliev	Head coach
(Bulgaria) Lyuben Lyubenov	Assistant coach
(Bulgaria) Ivaylo Ivanov	Goalkeeper coach
(Bulgaria) Kostadin Dzhorgov	Fitness coach
(Bulgaria) Pavel Toshkov	Analyst
(Bulgaria) Hristo Vidinov	Analyst

== Honours ==
Bulgarian V Group:
- Champions (1): 1982-83

== Past seasons ==
Season	League	Place	W	D	L	GF	GA	Pts
1981–82	Sofia V Group (III)	7	15	9	10	51	36	39
1982–83	Sofia V Group (III)	1	23	7	4	76	26	53
1983–84	South B Group (II)	17	8	6	20	45	65	22
2016–17	Second League (II)	13	9	6	15	44	49	33
2022–23	South-West Third League (III)	5	11	9	10	54	35	42
2023–24	South-West Third League (III)	2	25	5	8	68	39	80
2024–25	Second League (II)	13	12	13	13	47	41	49
2025–26	Second League (II)	5	16	7	9	57	32	55
Green marks a season followed by promotion, red a season followed by relegation.
