= 2025–26 Second Professional Football League (Bulgaria) =

70th season of the Second Professional Football League (Bulgaria)

Second Professional Football League
- Season: 2025–26
- Dates: July 2025 – June 2026
- Promoted: Dunav Ruse
- Relegated: Belasitsa; Minyor Pernik; Sevlievo
- Matches: 272
- Goals: 674 (2.48 per match)
- Top goalscorer: Mark-Emilio Papazov (18 goals)
- Best goalkeeper: Georgi Kitanov (20 clean sheets)
- Longest winning run: 7 games Fratria
- Longest unbeaten run: 22 games Dunav Ruse
- Longest winless run: 12 games Belasitsa
- Longest losing run: 6 games Sevlievo
- All statistics correct as of 17:33, 23 May 2026 (UTC).

The 2025–26 Second Professional Football League, also known as MrBit Second League for sponsorship reasons, will be the 70th season of the Second League, the second tier of the Bulgarian football league system, and the 10th season under this name and current league structure.

This season, the league was reduced to 18 teams, including two teams relegated from First League and three teams promoted from Third League.

On 2 July 2025, the league was further reduced to 17 teams, after it was announced that Krumovgrad officially withdraws from participation due to lack of a proper venue in accordance with Bulgarian Football Union′s regulations.

== Teams ==
The following teams have changed divisions since the 2024–25 season.

=== To Second League ===
Promoted from Third League

- Chernomorets Burgas
- Sevlievo
- Vihren

Relegated from First League

- Hebar
- Krumovgrad (Note: Krumovgrad officially withdrew from participation before the start of the season.)

=== From Second League ===
Relegated to Third League

- Lovech
- Botev Plovdiv II
- Strumska Slava
- Nesebar

Promoted to First League

- Dobrudzha
- Montana

Not returning

- CSKA 1948 Sofia II

Declined promotion

- Septemvri Tervel

== Stadiums and locations ==
Location of teams in 2025–26 Second League

Team	City	Stadium	Capacity
Belasitsa	Petrich	Tsar Samuil	12,000
Chernomorets	Burgas	Lazur	18,037
CSKA II	Sofia	Dragalevtsi	2,500
Dunav	Ruse	Gradski	13,000
Etar	Veliko Tarnovo	Ivaylo	18,000
Fratria	Varna	Albena 1	1,500
Hebar	Pazardzhik	Georgi Benkovski	13,128
Lokomotiv	Gorna Oryahovitsa	Lokomotiv	10,500
Ludogorets II	Razgrad	Eagles' Nest	2,000
Marek	Dupnitsa	Bonchuk	16,000
Minyor	Pernik	Minyor	8,000
Pirin	Blagoevgrad	Hristo Botev	7,500
Sevlievo	Sevlievo	Rakovski	5,000
Spartak	Pleven	Pleven	22,000
Sportist	Svoge	Chavdar Tsvetkov	3,500
Vihren	Sandanski	Sandanski	6,000
Yantra	Gabrovo	Hristo Botev	14,000

== League table ==
Pos	Team	Pld	W	D	L	GF	GA	GD	Pts	
1	Dunav Ruse (C, P)	32	20	9	3	53	16	+37	69	Promotion to the First League
2	Yantra (Q)	32	18	10	4	45	24	+21	64	Qualification for the promotion play-off
3	Fratria Varna	32	18	9	5	61	29	+32	63	
4	Vihren	32	17	7	8	59	34	+25	58	
5	CSKA Sofia II	32	16	7	9	57	32	+25	55	Ineligible for promotion
6	Chernomorets Burgas	32	11	13	8	38	32	+6	46	
7	Etar	32	11	11	10	39	43	−4	44	
8	Ludogorets Razgrad II	32	11	8	13	41	43	−2	41	Ineligible for promotion
9	Marek	32	10	11	11	27	35	−8	41	
10	Hebar	32	11	7	14	41	51	−10	40	
11	Pirin Blagoevgrad	32	9	11	12	38	41	−3	38	
12	Spartak Pleven	32	9	8	15	37	45	−8	35	
13	Sportist Svoge	32	9	7	16	28	48	−20	34	
14	Lokomotiv Gorna Oryahovitsa	32	8	9	15	33	52	−19	33	
15	Sevlievo (R)	32	9	5	18	29	52	−23	32	Relegation to the Third League
16	Minyor Pernik (R)	32	7	9	16	32	45	−13	30	Relegation to the Third League
17	Belasitsa (R)	32	4	7	21	26	62	−36	19	Relegation to the Third League
18	Krumovgrad (R, D)	0	0	0	0	0	0	0	0	Disqualified

Updated to match(es) played on 23 May 2026. Source: bulgarian-football.com
Rules for classification: 1) Points; 2) Head-to-head points; 3) Head-to-head goal difference; 4) Head-to-head goals scored; 5) Head-to-head away goals scored (only if two teams); 6) Goal difference; 7) Goals scored; 8) Fairplay ranking; 9) Draw.
(C) Champions; (D) Disqualified; (P) Promoted; (Q) Qualified for the phase indicated; (R) Relegated

== Results ==
Home \ Away	BEL	CHE	CSS	DUN	ETV	FRA	HEB	LGO	LUD	MAR	MIN	PIR	SEV	SPA	SPO	VIH	YAN
Belasitsa	—	1–0	2–6	1–2	2–4	0–3	0–1	3–3	1–1	0–1	0–0	0–3	1–0	1–1	3–0	0–2	0–2
Chernomorets Burgas	0–0	—	3–0	1–1	1–1	0–2	1–1	0–0	0–0	3–0	1–1	2–0	1–0	2–0	1–0	3–2	1–1
CSKA Sofia II	2–0	1–1	—	1–0	4–1	1–0	2–0	1–1	0–0	0–1	0–1	2–1	6–1	4–0	6–0	2–0	0–1
Dunav Ruse	3–0	2–0	2–0	—	2–0	2–0	0–0	2–1	1–0	0–0	2–0	0–0	2–0	4–0	4–0	2–2	0–1
Etar	3–0	3–3	3–1	0–0	—	1–1	0–1	2–1	1–0	4–1	3–0	3–2	0–0	0–0	0–3	3–3	0–1
Fratria Varna	5–0	2–1	2–2	2–2	2–0	—	3–2	3–0	5–0	1–1	3–1	3–0	1–4	1–0	2–1	2–0	0–1
Hebar	4–3	1–3	1–1	0–3	2–0	1–3	—	1–2	1–2	1–1	1–1	4–2	0–2	0–3	0–3	1–0	3–2
Lokomotiv Gorna Oryahovitsa	1–0	0–0	0–3	0–1	0–1	1–1	1–2	—	0–1	0–1	3–1	1–2	2–1	3–1	1–0	1–2	2–2
Ludogorets Razgrad II	1–1	4–2	4–1	1–3	0–1	1–1	2–1	3–1	—	4–0	4–2	2–1	1–1	3–1	2–2	0–1	1–3
Marek	2–1	3–0	1–1	1–1	1–0	1–3	2–0	1–1	1–0	—	1–2	3–1	0–1	0–0	0–0	1–0	1–2
Minyor Pernik	1–1	1–1	1–2	1–2	0–0	2–3	0–2	3–0	0–2	1–1	—	0–0	0–2	0–0	3–1	3–2	0–1
Pirin Blagoevgrad	1–0	1–0	2–1	1–3	1–1	0–0	2–2	0–1	0–0	0–0	1–0	—	4–1	1–1	0–0	0–1	2–2
Sevlievo	2–1	3–2	1–2	0–2	0–1	0–1	0–2	1–1	3–0	0–0	1–3	1–3	—	0–2	0–1	0–4	1–0
Spartak Pleven	2–1	1–2	2–1	0–2	4–0	1–1	1–2	5–2	2–0	2–0	1–0	2–5	0–1	—	0–0	2–3	1–2
Sportist Svoge	0–1	0–1	0–1	3–2	1–1	0–3	1–0	0–1	2–1	3–1	0–4	2–0	1–1	1–1	—	2–1	0–1
Vihren	3–1	0–2	0–0	0–0	2–2	2–1	3–2	6–0	2–1	2–0	3–0	2–1	5–1	1–0	4–1	—	0–0
Yantra	3–1	0–0	0–3	0–1	4–0	1–1	2–2	2–2	1–0	1–0	1–0	1–1	3–0	2–1	2–0	0–0	—

Updated to match(es) played on 23 May 2026. Source: bulgarian-football.com
Legend: Blue = home team win; Yellow = draw; Red = away team win.
For upcoming matches, an "a" indicates there is an article about the rivalry between the two participants.

=== Results by round ===
Team ╲ Round	1	2	3	4	5	6	7	8	9	10	11	12	13	14	15	16	17	18	19	20	21	22	23	24	25	26	27	28	29	30	31	32	33	34
Belasitsa Petrich	D	-	L	D	L	L	L	D	L	D	L	L	L	W	W	L	L	D	-	D	L	L	L	L	D	L	W	L	L	L	W	L	L	L
Chernomorets Burgas	L	D	D	-	D	W	D	W	L	D	L	L	D	D	W	W	W	L	D	D	-	D	W	W	W	D	L	W	D	W	D	L	W	L
CSKA Sofia II	L	L	W	L	W	L	D	D	W	D	W	W	W	W	L	-	D	W	D	D	W	W	W	L	W	L	L	W	W	D	L	W	-	W
Dunav Ruse	-	W	W	W	D	W	W	W	W	W	W	D	W	W	W	W	W	-	W	W	L	D	W	W	D	D	D	D	D	L	W	D	L	W
Etar Veliko Tarnovo	D	D	L	L	D	-	W	D	L	D	L	W	D	D	L	W	W	L	W	D	L	W	-	W	L	W	D	D	W	W	D	L	W	L
Fratria Varna	W	W	W	W	W	W	W	L	W	-	D	W	L	W	L	W	D	W	W	D	D	W	L	D	D	W	-	W	D	D	L	D	W	W
Hebar Pazardzhik	W	L	D	D	-	L	W	D	L	L	W	W	D	L	W	L	L	L	L	W	W	-	W	L	L	W	D	W	D	L	L	W	D	L
Lokomotiv Gorna Oryahovitsa	L	L	W	W	D	W	L	D	W	D	D	D	W	-	L	W	D	L	L	D	L	D	L	L	L	W	W	L	D	L	-	L	L	L
Ludogorets Razgrad II	L	W	L	L	L	L	L	D	L	W	W	W	-	W	W	L	L	W	D	D	L	D	L	D	D	L	D	W	D	-	W	W	L	W
Marek Dupnitsa	W	D	D	L	L	L	-	D	L	D	L	D	W	W	L	W	L	L	L	L	D	L	D	-	W	D	W	W	D	W	D	W	D	W
Minyor Pernik	D	L	D	D	D	W	W	W	L	L	L	-	L	D	W	W	L	D	D	D	L	L	D	W	L	L	L	L	-	W	L	L	L	L
Pirin Blagoevgrad	D	W	-	L	W	W	L	L	W	L	W	L	D	L	D	W	D	D	D	-	W	D	L	L	D	W	D	L	D	L	D	L	W	L
Sevlievo	L	D	D	D	W	L	L	L	-	D	W	L	L	L	L	L	L	W	L	W	L	D	W	W	W	-	L	L	L	L	L	W	L	W
Spartak Pleven	W	L	L	D	L	L	L	D	W	D	L	L	L	D	-	L	W	L	L	L	W	D	L	W	W	D	D	W	D	L	W	-	W	L
Sportist Svoge	D	D	W	D	L	L	L	-	L	D	L	W	L	L	D	L	W	W	W	D	W	L	L	L	-	L	D	L	L	W	L	W	L	W
Vihren Sandanski	W	W	L	W	D	W	W	L	W	D	W	L	W	L	D	L	-	W	W	D	W	D	W	W	L	L	D	L	W	W	W	D	W	-
Yantra Gabrovo	D	D	D	W	W	W	W	W	W	W	-	D	W	L	D	L	W	D	D	L	W	W	W	L	D	W	W	-	D	W	W	D	W	W

Updated to match(es) played on 23 May 2026. Source: Bulgarian Football
W = Win; D = Draw; L = Loss; - = Annulled

=== Positions by round ===
Team ╲ Round	1	2	3	4	5	6	7	8	9	10	11	12	13	14	15	16	17	18	19	20	21	22	23	24	25	26	27	28	29	30	31	32	33	34
Belasitsa	6	12	17	16	17	17	17	17	17	17	17	17	17	17	15	15	16	17	17	17	17	17	17	17	17	17	17	17	17	17	17	17	17	17
Chernomorets Burgas	15	14	13	15	14	10	9	7	9	9	10	11	11	13	11	10	8	8	9	9	10	9	8	6	6	6	6	6	6	6	6	6	6	6
CSKA Sofia II	14	17	12	14	9	11	10	10	8	8	7	5	5	5	5	5	5	5	5	5	5	5	5	5	5	5	5	5	5	5	5	5	5	5
Dunav Ruse	12	6	2	2	2	2	2	2	2	1	1	1	1	1	1	1	1	1	1	1	1	1	1	1	1	1	1	1	1	1	1	1	1	1
Etar	7	9	15	17	16	15	12	10	12	12	14	12	12	12	13	13	11	11	11	11	12	8	9	7	7	7	7	8	7	7	7	7	7	7
Fratria	4	1	1	1	1	1	1	1	1	3	2	2	3	2	2	2	2	2	2	2	2	2	2	2	2	2	2	2	2	2	3	3	3	3
Hebar	1	7	7	7	10	12	8	9	10	10	9	8	8	8	7	9	10	10	13	12	8	10	6	8	9	9	10	7	8	8	8	8	8	10
Lokomotiv Gorna Oryahovitsa	13	16	11	6	5	5	5	6	5	5	5	6	6	6	6	6	6	6	6	6	7	7	10	12	12	10	9	10	10	11	12	12	13	14
Ludogorets Razgrad II	16	5	8	11	15	16	16	16	16	16	12	9	9	11	10	12	13	12	8	7	9	11	11	11	11	11	11	11	11	12	9	9	9	8
Marek Dupnitsa	5	4	5	8	11	13	14	14	15	15	15	16	13	10	12	11	12	14	14	14	14	14	15	15	16	16	14	12	12	10	11	10	10	9
Minyor Pernik	8	13	14	12	12	7	7	5	7	7	8	10	10	9	9	8	9	9	10	10	11	12	12	10	11	12	12	14	14	13	14	15	15	16
Pirin Blagoevgrad	9	3	6	9	6	6	6	8	6	6	6	7	7	7	8	7	7	7	7	8	6	6	7	9	8	8	8	9	9	9	10	11	11	11
Sevlievo	17	15	16	13	7	8	13	13	14	13	11	13	14	14	16	16	17	15	15	15	15	15	14	13	13	13	13	15	15	16	16	16	16	15
Spartak Pleven	3	8	9	10	13	14	15	15	11	11	13	15	16	16	17	17	15	16	16	16	16	16	16	16	15	15	15	13	13	14	13	13	12	12
Sportist Svoge	10	10	4	5	8	9	11	12	13	14	16	14	15	15	14	14	14	13	12	13	13	13	13	14	14	14	16	16	16	15	15	14	14	13
Vihren Sandanski	2	2	3	3	3	3	3	4	4	4	4	4	4	4	4	4	4	4	4	3	3	4	4	3	3	3	4	4	4	4	4	4	4	4
Yantra Gabrovo	11	11	10	4	4	4	4	3	3	2	3	3	2	3	3	3	3	3	3	4	4	3	3	4	4	4	3	3	3	3	2	2	2	2

Updated to match(es) played on 23 May 2026. Source: Bulgarian Football

== Season statistics ==
=== Top scorers ===
As of 24 May 2026

Rank	Player	Club	Goals
1	(Bulgaria) Mark-Emilio Papazov	CSKA Sofia II	18
2	(Brazil) Léo Pimenta	Vihren Sandanski	15
3	(Bulgaria) Miroslav Marinov	Fratria	14
4	(Bulgaria) Denislav Angelov	Yantra Gabrovo	13
5	(Bulgaria) Preslav Antonov	Sevlievo	11
5	(Bulgaria) Preslav Yordanov	Minyor Pernik	11
5	(Bulgaria) Steven Stoyanchov	Etar Veliko Tarnovo	11
5	(Bulgaria) Dimitar Kostadinov	Chernomorets Burgas	11
9	(France) Ibrahim Keita	Dunav Ruse	10
10	(Bulgaria) Steliyan Dobrev	Etar Veliko Tarnovo	9
10	(Bulgaria) Kristiyan Boychev	Dunav Ruse	9

=== Clean sheets ===
As of 23 May 2026

Rank	Player	Club	Clean sheets
1	(Bulgaria) Georgi Kitanov	Dunav Ruse	20
2	(Bulgaria) Konstantin Kostadinov	Marek	16
3	(Bulgaria) Hristiyan Vasilev	Yantra Gabrovo	15
4	(Bulgaria) Stanislav Nistorov	Vihren Sandanski	12
4	(Moldova) Igor Mostovei	Fratria	12
6	(Bulgaria) Nikola Videnov	Etar Veliko Tarnovo	11
6	(Bulgaria) Martin Kaishev	Chernomorets Burgas	11
6	(Bulgaria) Krasimir Kostov	Pirin Blagoevgrad	11
11	(Bulgaria) Ivan Goshev	Minyor Pernik	8
