= 2025–26 FC Fratria season =

Fratria
2025–26 season
- Chairman: Viktor Bakurevich
- Manager: Alexei Savinov (until 13 March 2026); Yevhen Lutsenko (caretaker) (from 13 March 2026)(until 17 March 2026); Renārs Rode (from 17 March 2026)
- Stadium: Albena 1 Stadium, Albena; Spartak Stadium, Varna
- Second League: 3rd
- Bulgarian Cup: Round of 32
- Top goalscorer: League: Miroslav Marinov (14 goals); All: Miroslav Marinov (15 goals)
Home colours	Away colours

The 2025–26 season is the 5th season in the history of FC Fratria and their second season in the Second League. In addition to the domestic league, the club would also participate in the Bulgarian Cup.

== Staff ==
Position	Name	Nationality
Coaching staff
Head coach	Renārs Rode	(Latvia)
Assistant coach	Yevhen Lutsenko	(Ukraine)
Assistant coach	Yuriy Podolchuk	(Ukraine)
Goalkeepers coach	Oleksandr Lavrentsov	(Ukraine)
Conditioning coach	Atanas Stefanov	(Bulgaria)
Doctor	Hryhoriy Makarov	(Ukraine)
Administrator	Evgeni Nikolaev	(Bulgaria)
Administrator	Artur Napilov	(Ukraine)

== Squad ==
As of 26 May 2026

Note: Flags indicate national team as has been defined under FIFA eligibility rules. Players may hold more than one non-FIFA nationality.

Squad no.	Player	Nationality	Position(s)	Date of birth (age)	Matches	Goals	Signed in	Previous club
Goalkeepers
12	Vladyslav Ukrainskyi	(Ukraine)	GK	24 May 2008 (age 18)	0	0	2021	Youth system
12	Radostin Dunkov	(Bulgaria)	GK	23 June 2009 (age 17)	0	0	2024	(Bulgaria) Zvezdenburg
33	Igor Mostovei	(Moldova)	GK	25 September 1999 (age 27)	46	0	2025 (winter)	(Moldova) Milsami
69	Iliyan Iliev	(Bulgaria)	GK	19 June 2005 (age 21)	1	0	2026 (winter)	(Bulgaria) Spartak Pleven
Defenders
3	Aleksandar Angelov	(Bulgaria)	CB / RB	27 May 2002 (age 24)	66	4	2024	(Bulgaria) Litex Lovech
4	Kristiyan Peshov	(Bulgaria)	RW / RB	16 June 1997 (age 29)	12	0	2026 (winter)	(Bulgaria) Botev Vratsa
6	Aleksandar Tsvetkov	(Bulgaria)	DM / CB	31 August 1990 (age 36)	27	1	2025	(Bulgaria) Spartak Varna
13	Arhan Isuf	(Bulgaria)	RB / CB	25 January 1999 (age 27)	31	1	2025	(Bulgaria) Krumovgrad
17	Martin Kostadinov	(Bulgaria)	LB / LW	13 May 1996 (age 30)	53	5	2023	(Bulgaria) Dunav Ruse
71	Ibryam Ibryam	(Bulgaria)	CB / LB	12 January 2001 (age 25)	77	4	2023	(Bulgaria) Dobrudzha Dobrich
90	Vadim Dijinari	(Moldova)	CB / LB	1 April 1999 (age 27)	10	2	2026 (winter)	(Moldova) Petrocub Hîncești
	Georgi Ivanov	(Bulgaria)	CB	22 May 2009 (age 17)	0	0	2025	(Bulgaria) CSKA 1948 U17
Midfielders
7	Ayvan Angelov	(Bulgaria)	AM / CM	10 November 2003 (age 22)	27	2	2025	(Bulgaria) Yantra Gabrovo
8	Rumen Rumenov	(Bulgaria)	CM / DM	7 June 1993 (age 33)	22	3	2025	(Bulgaria) Dobrudzha Dobrich
9	Denis Kadir	(Bulgaria)	AM / CM / DM	2 July 1999 (age 27)	83	15	2023	(Bulgaria) Septemvri Tervel
11	Viktor Mitev	(Bulgaria)	LW / LB	15 February 1992 (age 34)	24	4	2025	(Bulgaria) Spartak Varna
19	Stefan Statev	(Bulgaria)	LW / RW	4 June 2003 (age 23)	4	0	2026 (winter)	(Bulgaria) Dunav Ruse
21	Iliyan Kapitanov	(Bulgaria)	LW / RW / AM	21 May 1992 (age 34)	58	9	2024	(Bulgaria) Litex Lovech
22	Georgi Atanasov	(Bulgaria)	LW / RW	6 March 2004 (age 22)	10	1	2026 (winter)	(Bulgaria) FC Sportist Svoge
23	Ivan Brikner	(Ukraine)	CM / DM	30 June 1993 (age 33)	29	5	2025	(Poland) Sokół Kleczew
77	Tymur Korablin	(Ukraine)	CM / AM	2 January 2002 (age 24)	14	1	2026 (winter)	(Ukraine) Zorya Luhansk
Forwards
10	Xavello Druiventak	(Netherlands)	RW / LW / AM	3 May 2004 (age 22)	50	15	2024	(Lithuania) Tauras Tauragė
15	Miroslav Marinov	(Bulgaria)	ST	7 March 2004 (age 22)	31	14	2025	(Bulgaria) Botev Vratsa
18	Todor Kolev	(Bulgaria)	ST	24 April 2010 (age 16)	2	0	2024	Youth system
18	Ivan Pavlov	(Bulgaria)	ST	20 September 2008 (age 18)	2	0	2024	Youth system
20	Maksim Marinov	(Bulgaria)	ST / AM	22 April 2008 (age 18)	26	0	2023	(Bulgaria) Ludogorets Razgrad Academy
25	Daniel Halachev	(Bulgaria)	ST	8 March 2005 (age 21)	10	2	2026 (winter)	(Bulgaria) Spartak Varna (loan)
98	Valentin Yoskov	(Bulgaria)	ST	5 May 1998 (age 28)	30	5	2025	(Bulgaria) Pirin Blagoevgrad
Out on Loan
44	Angel Granchov	(Bulgaria)	CB / LB	16 October 1992 (age 33)	1	1	2025	(Bulgaria) Spartak Varna
Left Permanently During the Season
1	Hennadiy Hanyev	(Ukraine)	GK	15 May 1990 (age 36)	0	0	2025	(Bulgaria) Lokomotiv Gorna Oryahovitsa
4	Sergiy Chyzhyk	(Ukraine) (Note: Chyzhik holds both Ukrainian and Bulgarian passport)	LB / RB	30 May 2005 (age 21)	7	0	2024	(Bulgaria) Cherno More II
8	Steliyan Dobrev	(Bulgaria)	AM / CM	12 November 2003 (age 22)	39	4	2024 (Winter)	(Bulgaria) CSKA 1948
14	Mikhail Gashchuk	(Bulgaria) (Note: Gashchuk is born in Russia)	CM / AM / ST	4 January 2007 (age 19)	25	2	2023 (Note: Left Fratria in 2022 for Botev, before return in 2023.)	(Bulgaria) Botev Plovdiv
19	Stoyan Pergelov	(Bulgaria)	LB / CB	20 April 2006 (age 20)	3	0	2025	(England) Birmingham City
22	Artur Daniyelyan	(Armenia) (Note: Daniyelyan is born in Ukraine)	RB / CB	9 February 1998 (age 28)	4	0	2025	West Armenia
24	Oleksandr Chernozub	(Ukraine)	LW / RW	18 May 2005 (age 21)	3	0	2025	(Latvia) FK Liepaja
26	Erik Georgiev	(Bulgaria)	GK	2 January 2007 (age 19)	0	0	2023	Youth system
70	Didis Lutumba-Pitah	(Finland)	RW / LW / ST	13 November 1998 (age 27)	6	1	2025	(Bulgaria) Etar Veliko Tarnovo
77	Erik Manolkov	(Bulgaria)	ST	31 December 2005 (age 20)	6	1	2025	(Bulgaria) Lokomotiv Sofia
96	Dzhaner Sadetinov	(Bulgaria)	CB / DM / CM	30 January 2006 (age 20)	18	0	2025	(Bulgaria) Dobrudzha Dobrich
	Nikolay Iliev	(Bulgaria)	CB	12 June 2008 (age 18)	0	0	2024	Youth system
	Viktor Diev	(Bulgaria)	CB	1 January 2008 (age 18)	0	0	2024	Youth system
	Preslav Petkov	(Bulgaria)	LB	19 April 2008 (age 18)	0	0	2024	Youth system
	Nikola Zahariev	(Bulgaria)	CB / LB	23 December 2008 (age 17)	1	0	2024	Youth system
	Rosen Zakaryan	(Bulgaria)	DM / CM	24 September 2007 (age 19)	4	0	2024	(Bulgaria) Dunav Ruse
	Denislav Hasanov	(Bulgaria)	DM / CM	21 August 2007 (age 19)	2	0	2024	(Bulgaria) Cherno More
	David Lukanov	(Bulgaria)	DM / CM	1 March 2004 (age 22)	13	0	2024	(Bulgaria) Cherno More II
	Stefan Stefanov	(Bulgaria)	ST	2 August 2008 (age 18)	3	0	2023	(Bulgaria) Cherno More Varna U17

== Transfers ==
For all recent transfers, see Transfers summer 2025 and Transfers winter 2025–26.

=== In ===
No.	Pos.	Nat.	Name	Age	EU	Moving from	Type	Transfer window	Ends	Transfer fee	Source
77	FW	(Bulgaria)	Erik Manolkov	19	EU	(Bulgaria) Lokomotiv Sofia	transfer	Summer		Free	
44	DF	(Bulgaria)	Angel Granchov	32	EU	(Bulgaria) Spartak Varna	transfer	Summer		Free	
11	MF	(Bulgaria)	Viktor Mitev	33	EU	(Bulgaria) Spartak Varna	transfer	Summer		Free	
6	MF	(Bulgaria)	Aleksandar Tsvetkov	34	EU	(Bulgaria) Spartak Varna	transfer	Summer		Free	
7	MF	(Bulgaria)	Ayvan Angelov	21	EU	(Bulgaria) Yantra Gabrovo	transfer	Summer		Free	
96	MF	(Bulgaria)	Dzhaner Sadetinov	19	EU	(Bulgaria) Dobrudzha Dobrich	transfer	Summer		Free	
15	FW	(Bulgaria)	Miroslav Marinov	21	EU	(Bulgaria) Botev Vratsa	transfer	Summer		Free	
23	MF	(Ukraine)	Ivan Brikner	32	EU	(Poland) Sokół Kleczew	transfer	Summer		Free	
1	GK	(Ukraine)	Hennadiy Hanyev	35	EU	(Bulgaria) Lokomotiv Gorna Oryahovitsa	transfer	Summer		Free	
22	DF	(Armenia)	Artur Daniyelyan	27	Non-EU	West Armenia	transfer	Summer		Free	
13	DF	(Bulgaria)	Arhan Isuf	26	EU	(Bulgaria) Krumovgrad	transfer	Summer		Free	
98	FW	(Bulgaria)	Valentin Yoskov	27	EU	(Bulgaria) Pirin Blagoevgrad	transfer	Summer		Free	
8	MF	(Bulgaria)	Rumen Rumenov	32	EU	(Bulgaria) Dobrudzha Dobrich	transfer	Summer		Free	
19	DF	(Bulgaria)	Stoyan Pergelov	19	EU	(England) Birmingham City	transfer	Summer		Free	
24	MF	(Ukraine)	Oleksandr Chernozub	20	Non-EU	(Latvia) FK Liepaja	free transfer	Summer		Free	
70	FW	(Finland)	Didis Lutumba-Pitah	26	EU	(Bulgaria) Etar Veliko Tarnovo	free transfer	Summer		Free	
19	FW	(Bulgaria)	Stefan Statev	22	EU	(Bulgaria) Dunav Ruse	free transfer	Winter		Free	
69	GK	(Bulgaria)	Iliyan Iliev	20	EU	(Bulgaria) Spartak Pleven	free transfer	Winter		Free	
25	FW	(Bulgaria)	Daniel Halachev	20	EU	(Bulgaria) Spartak Varna	Loan	Winter		Loan	
90	DF	(Moldova)	Vadim Dijinari	26	EU	(Moldova) Petrocub Hîncești	free transfer	Winter		Free	
97	MF	(Ukraine)	Tymur Korablin	24	Non-EU	(Ukraine) Zorya Luhansk	free transfer	Winter		Free	

=== Out ===
No.	Pos.	Nat.	Name	Age	EU	Moving to	Type	Transfer window	Transfer fee	Source
—	DF	(Bulgaria)	Ivaylo Petrov	18	EU	(Bulgaria) Spartak Varna II	Released	Summer	Free	
6	DF	(Bulgaria)	Kaloyan Ivanov	19	EU	Released	Released	Summer	Free	
19	MF	(Moldova)	Vasile Bitlan	21	EU	Released	Released	Summer	Free	
15	FW	(Bulgaria)	Nikola Totev	19	EU	(Bulgaria) Spartak Varna II	Released	Summer	Free	
77	FW	(Bulgaria)	Georgi Lazarov	20	EU	(Bulgaria) Cherno More	Transfer	Summer	undisclosed fee	
5	DF	(Bulgaria)	Vasil Dobrev	27	EU	(Bulgaria) Volov Shumen	Transfer	Summer	Free	
1	GK	(Bulgaria)	Stefan Petkov	23	EU	(Bulgaria) Benskovski Isperih	Transfer	Summer	Free	
69	DF	(France)	Dylan Junior Abé	22	EU	Released	Released	Summer	Free	
13	DF	(Bulgaria)	Galin Minkov	27	EU	(Bulgaria) Rilski Sportist	Released	Summer	Free	
12	GK	(Bulgaria)	Andriyan Kalev	15	EU	(Bulgaria) Aksakovo	Released	Summer	Free	
23	DF	(Central African Republic)	Mike Bettinger	21	EU	(Belgium) Olympic Charleroi	Released	Summer	Free	
16	MF	(Ukraine)	Arseniy Bogdanov	17	EU	Retired	End of career	Summer	Free	
15	MF	(Russia)	Platon Bakurevich	18	EU	Retired	End of career	Summer	Free	
11	FW	(Bulgaria)	Lachezar Voykov	17	EU	(Bulgaria) Chernomorets Balchik	Released	Summer	Free	
8	MF	(Bulgaria)	Steliyan Dobrev	21	EU	(Bulgaria) Sevlievo	Loan	Summer	Loan	
44	DF	(Bulgaria)	Angel Granchov	32	EU	(Bulgaria) Spartak Varna	Loan	Summer	Loan	
22	DF	(Armenia)	Artur Daniyelyan	27	Non-EU	Released	Released	Summer	Free	
1	GK	(Ukraine)	Hennadiy Hanyev	35	EU	(Bulgaria) Sevlievo	Released	Winter	Free	
—	MF	(Bulgaria)	Steliyan Dobrev	22	EU	(Bulgaria) Etar Veliko Tarnovo	Released	Winter	Free	
4	DF	(Bulgaria)	Sergiy Chyzhyk	20	EU	(Lithuania) FK Be1	Released	Winter	Free	
19	DF	(Bulgaria)	Stoyan Pergelov	19	EU	(Bulgaria) Hebar	Released	Winter	Free	
24	MF	(Ukraine)	Oleksandr Chernozub	20	EU	Released	Released	Winter	Free	
77	FW	(Bulgaria)	Erik Manolkov	20	EU	(Bulgaria) Slivnishki Geroy	Released	Winter	Free	
70	FW	(Finland)	Didis Lutumba-Pitah	27	EU	Released	Released	Winter	Free	
96	DF	(Bulgaria)	Dzhaner Sadetinov	19	EU	(Bulgaria) Chernomorets Burgas	Transfer	Winter	Free	
26	GK	(Bulgaria)	Erik Georgiev	18	EU	(Bulgaria) Septemvri Tervel	Released	Winter	Free	
14	MF	(Bulgaria)	Mikhail Gashchuk	19	EU	(Bulgaria) Spartak Varna	Transfer	Winter	Free	
22	MF	(Bulgaria)	David Lukanov	20	EU	(Bulgaria) Yantra Gabrovo	Transfer	Winter	Free	
—	DF	(Bulgaria)	Nikolay Iliev	17	EU	(Bulgaria) Cherno More II	Transfer	Winter	Free	
—	MF	(Bulgaria)	Denislav Hasanov	18	EU	(Bulgaria) Spartak Varna II	Transfer	Winter	Free	
—	MF	(Bulgaria)	Nikola Zahariev	17	EU	(Bulgaria) Spartak Varna II	Transfer	Winter	Free	
—	FW	(Bulgaria)	Stefan Stefanov	17	EU	(Bulgaria) Arda Kardzhali U18	Transfer	Winter	Free	

== Pre-season and friendlies ==
Win Draw Loss Fixtures

18 June 2025 Pre-season	Fratria	1–0	Dobrudzha Dobrich	Albena
18:00	Kadir			Stadium: Albena 1 Stadium

21 June 2025 Pre-season	(Romania) Farul Constanța	0–1	Fratria	Ovidiu, Romania
11:30			Ayvan	Stadium: Central Stadium

28 June 2025 Pre-season	Ludogorets II	1–3	Fratria	Razgrad
18:00	Yordanov		Mitev Geleya Ayvan	Stadium: Eagles' Nest

5 July 2025 Pre-season	Sevlievo	2–0	Fratria	Sevlievo
18:30	Makaveev 19' Montoya 55'			Stadium: Rakovski Stadium

9 July 2025 Pre-season	Yantra Gabrovo	0–1	Fratria	Teteven
			Miroslav M. 3'	Stadium: Georgi Benkovski Stadium

19 July 2025 Pre-season	Septemvri Tervel	0–2	Fratria	Tervel
			Kapitanov 69' Ibryam 75'	Stadium: Septemvri Stadium

15 January 2026 Winter friendies	Fratria	0–1	Spartak Varna	Beloslav
				Stadium: Dimitar Vatev Stadium

20 January 2026 Winter friendies	Fratria	v	Cherno More Varna	Albena
		Report		Stadium: Albena 1 Stadium

24 January 2026 Winter friendies	Chernomorets Burgas	2–2	Fratria	Balgarevo Stadium
	Zh. Ivanov 61' Petkov (pen.), 69'	Report	Yoskov 50' 56'

2 February 2026 Winter camp	(Ukraine) Epitsentr Kamianets-Podilskyi	3–0	Fratria
14:30	Kovalets 3' 23'; Bezhenar 84'	Report

6 February 2026 Winter camp	Fratria	2–2	(Romania) Bihor Oradea
15:00

== Competitions ==
=== Vtora Liga ===
==== League table ====
Pos	Team	Pld	W	D	L	GF	GA	GD	Pts	
1	Dunav Ruse (C, P)	32	20	9	3	53	16	+37	69	Promotion to the First League
2	Yantra (Q)	32	18	10	4	45	24	+21	64	Qualification for the promotion play-off
3	Fratria Varna	32	18	9	5	61	29	+32	63	
4	Vihren	32	17	7	8	59	34	+25	58	
5	CSKA Sofia II	32	16	7	9	57	32	+25	55	Ineligible for promotion
6	Chernomorets Burgas	32	11	13	8	38	32	+6	46	

Updated to match(es) played on 23 May 2026. Source: bulgarian-football.com
Rules for classification: 1) Points; 2) Head-to-head points; 3) Head-to-head goal difference; 4) Head-to-head goals scored; 5) Head-to-head away goals scored (only if two teams); 6) Goal difference; 7) Goals scored; 8) Fairplay ranking; 9) Draw.
(C) Champions; (P) Promoted; (Q) Qualified for the phase indicated

==== Matches ====
Win Draw Loss Fixtures

26 July 2025 1	Fratria	2–1	Chernomorets Burgas	Albena
18:30	Granchov 3' Miroslav M. 13'	Report		Stadium: Albena 1 Stadium; Attendance: 200; Referee: Dimitar Burov

5 August 2025 2	Hebar	1–3	Fratria	Pazardzhik
18:00	Rusinov 90+4'	Report	Kapitanov 16' 74' Miroslav M. 42'	Stadium: Georgi Benkovski Stadium; Attendance: 350; Referee: Stanimir Todorov

10 August 2025 3	Fratria	2–0	Etar Veliko Tarnovo	Albena
18:00	Mitev 71' Al. Angelov 74'	Report		Stadium: Albena 1 Stadium; Attendance: 100; Referee: Stanislav Lazarov

16 August 2025 4	Marek Dupnitsa	1–3	Fratria	Dupnitsa
18:00	Nikolov 90+2'	Report	Brikner 26' Ayvan 67' Manolkov 90'	Stadium: Stadion Bonchuk; Attendance: 200; Referee: Lyuboslav Lyubomirov

23 August 2025 5	Fratria	2–1	Sportist Svoge	Albena
18:00	Miroslav M. 20' Brikner 50'	Report	Gelin 33'	Stadium: Albena 1 Stadium; Attendance: 120

31 August 2025 6	Sevlievo	0–1	Fratria	Sevlievo
18:00		Report	Mitev 8'	Stadium: Stadion Rakovski; Attendance: 150

6 September 2025 7	Fratria	5–0	Ludogorets Razgrad II	Albena
17:00	Yoskov 14' Mitev 17' Brikner 59' Al. Angelov 62' Druiventak 70'	Report		Stadium: Albena 1 Stadium; Attendance: 100

12 September 2025 8	Fratria	0–1	Yantra Gabrovo	Varna
15:30		Report	Babaliev 73'	Stadium: Spartak Stadium; Attendance: 150

21 September 2025 9	Minyor Pernik	2–3	Fratria	Pernik
15:00	Vasilev 21' 24'	Report	Kapitanov 54' Druiventak 62' 66'	Stadium: Stadion Minyor; Attendance: 250; Referee: Mihael Pavlov

27 September 2025 10	Fratria	v	Krumovgrad
17:00		Cancelled

6 October 2025 11	Lokomotiv Gorna Oryahovitsa	1–1	Fratria	Gorna Oryahovitsa
19:00	Ivanov 39'	Report	Brikner 10'	Stadium: Stadion Lokomotiv; Attendance: 250; Referee: Ventsislav Mitrev

20 October 2025 12	Fratria	1–0	Spartak Pleven	Varna
18:30	Kapitanov 15'	Report		Stadium: Spartak Stadium; Attendance: 200; Referee: Petar Nikolov

25 October 2025 13	CSKA II	1–0	Fratria	Pancharevo, Sofia
	Chatov 48'	Report		Stadium: CSKA Sofia Sports Complex; Attendance: 50; Referee: Martin Markov

1 November 2025 14	Fratria	2–0	Vihren Sandanski	Varna
17:30	Ayvan 62' Druiventak 89'	Report		Stadium: Spartak Stadium; Referee: Georgi Ivanov

8 November 2025 15	Dunav Ruse	2–0	Fratria	Ruse
17:30	Minchev 20' Bakkali 74'	Report		Stadium: Gradski; Referee: Mariyan Grebencharski

15 November 2025 16	Fratria	5–0	Belasitsa Petrich	Varna
13:30	Yoskov 14' Miroslav M. 47' 64' Tsvetkov 73' Mitev 76'	Report		Stadium: Spartak Stadium; Referee: Petar Asparuhov

22 November 2025 17	Pirin Blagoevgrad	0–0	Fratria	Blagoevgrad
15:00		Report		Stadium: Hristo Botev; Referee: Stoyan Arsov

29 November 2025 18	Chernomorets Burgas	0–2	Fratria	Burgas
14:30		Report	Druiventak 45+1' 48'	Stadium: Lazur; Referee: Gero Piskov

5 December 2025 19	Fratria	3–2	Hebar	Varna
15:00 EET	Isuf 23'; Marinov 34'; Denis Kadir (yellow card) 84'; Lutumba-Pitah 88'	Report	Malamov 24'; Tsvetanov (yellow card) 37'; Konstantin Pavlov 85'	Stadium: Spartak Stadium

17 February 2026 20	Etar Veliko Tarnovo	1–1	Fratria	Veliko Tarnovo
17:30 EET	Steven Stoyanchov 17'; Ivaylo Markov (yellow card) 32' (yellow-red card) 54'; Pemperski (yellow card) 35'; Viktor Vasilev (yellow card) 38'; Kristiyan Velichkov (yellow card) 90+3'	Report	Halachev (yellow card) 24'; Statev (yellow card) 24'; Angelov (yellow card) 41' (yellow-red card) 43'; Marinov 45+5'	Stadium: Ivaylo

22 February 2026 21	Fratria	1–1	Marek Dupnitsa	Varna
16:30 EET	Rumenov 29'	Report	Emmanuel Ajoku (yellow card) 20'; Dimitar Goranov (yellow card) 44'; Dimitrov 49'; Daniel Kirilov (yellow card) 86'; Hristo Kaymakanski (yellow card) 87'	Stadium: Spartak Stadium

28 February 2026 22	Sportist Svoge	0–3	Fratria	Svoge
14:00 EET	Aleksandar Bozhilov (yellow card) 8'; Samba (yellow card) 28'; Kristian Chachev (yellow card) 87'	Report	Isuf (yellow card) 11'; Yoskov 23'; Angelov (yellow card) 30'; Halachev 40'; Korablin (yellow card) 60'; Dijinari 69'	Stadium: Chavdar Tsvetkov

8 March 2026 23	Fratria	1–4	Sevlievo	Varna
15:30 EET	Yoskov (yellow card) 22'; Rumenov 53'; Tsvetkov (yellow card) 68'	Report	David Mihalev (yellow card) 11'; Martin Banev 35'; Preslav Antonov 45+1' 70'; Minkov (yellow card) 55'; Ivan Avramov 60'; Andrian Dimitrov (yellow card) 76'; Karagiannis (yellow card) 85'; Ivan Penev (yellow card) 90+2'	Stadium: Spartak Stadium

15 March 2026 24	Ludogorets Razgrad II	v	Fratria	Razgrad
15:30 EET				Stadium: Eagles' Nest

23 March 2026 25	Yantra Gabrovo	v	Fratria	Gabrovo
18:00 EET				Stadium: Hristo Botev

28 March 2026 26	Fratria	v	Minyor Pernik	Varna
15:30 EET				Stadium: Spartak Stadium

— 27	Krumovgrad	v	Fratria
		Cancelled

11 April 2026 28	Fratria	v	Lokomotiv Gorna Oryahovitsa	Varna
				Stadium: Spartak Stadium

18 April 2026 29	Spartak Pleven	v	Fratria	Pleven
				Stadium: Pleven

25 April 2026 30	Fratria	v	CSKA II	Varna
				Stadium: Spartak Stadium

2 May 2026 31	Vihren Sandanski	v	Fratria	Sandanski
				Stadium: Sandanski

9 May 2026 32	Fratria	v	Dunav Ruse	Varna
				Stadium: Spartak Stadium

16 May 2026 33	Belasitsa Petrich	v	Fratria	Petrich
				Stadium: Tsar Samuil

23 May 2026 34	Fratria	v	Pirin Blagoevgrad	Varna
				Stadium: Spartak Stadium

=== Bulgarian Cup ===
==== Matches ====
Win Draw Loss Fixtures

12 October 2025 Preliminary round	Germanea Sapareva Banya	0–4	Fratria	Sapareva Banya
15:00		Report	Brikner 64' Druiventak 78' 85' Manolkov 88'	Stadium: Gradski stadion

29 October 2025 First Round	Fratria	1–2	Arda Kardzhali	Varna
15:45	Miroslav M. 50'	Report	Hüseynov 42' Shinyashiki 64'	Stadium: Spartak Stadium; Attendance: 250; Referee: Denislav Stalev

== Statistics ==
=== Appearances and goals ===
No.	Pos	Nat	Player	Total		Second League		Bulgarian Cup	
No.	Pos	Nat	Player	Apps	Goals	Apps	Goals	Apps	Goals
3	DF	(Bulgaria) BUL	Aleksandar Angelov	32	2	27+3	2	2	0
4	DF	(Bulgaria) BUL	Kristiyan Peshov	12	0	9+3	0	0	0
5	DF	(Bulgaria) BUL	Georgi Ivanov	1	0	0	0	0+1	0
6	MF	(Bulgaria) BUL	Aleksandar Tsvetkov	27	1	27	1	0	0
7	MF	(Bulgaria) BUL	Ayvan Angelov	28	2	25+2	2	0+1	0
8	MF	(Bulgaria) BUL	Rumen Rumenov	24	3	21+1	3	2	0
9	MF	(Bulgaria) BUL	Denis Kadir	24	1	3+20	1	0+1	0
10	FW	(Netherlands) NED	Xavello Druiventak	30	10	7+21	8	1+1	2
11	MF	(Bulgaria) BUL	Viktor Mitev	25	4	19+5	4	1	0
12	GK	(Ukraine) UKR	Vladyslav Ukrainskyi	0	0	0	0	0	0
13	DF	(Bulgaria) BUL	Arhan Isuf	33	1	29+2	1	1+1	0
15	FW	(Bulgaria) BUL	Miroslav Marinov	33	15	30+1	14	1+1	1
17	DF	(Bulgaria) BUL	Martin Kostadinov	5	0	1+2	0	1+1	0
18	MF	(Bulgaria) BUL	Todor Kolev	3	0	0+2	0	0+1	0
18	MF	(Bulgaria) BUL	Ivan Pavlov	2	0	0+2	0	0	0
19	MF	(Bulgaria) BUL	Stefan Statev	4	0	1+3	0	0	0
20	FW	(Bulgaria) BUL	Maksim Marinov	9	0	0+8	0	1	0
21	MF	(Bulgaria) BUL	Iliyan Kapitanov	28	5	17+10	5	1	0
22	MF	(Bulgaria) BUL	Georgi Atanasov	10	1	10	1	0	0
23	MF	(Ukraine) UKR	Ivan Brikner	31	6	25+4	5	2	1
25	FW	(Bulgaria) BUL	Daniel Halachev	10	2	4+6	2	0	0
33	GK	(Moldova) MDA	Igor Mostovei	31	0	31	0	0	0
69	GK	(Bulgaria) BUL	Iliyan Iliev	1	0	1	0	0	0
71	DF	(Bulgaria) BUL	Ibryam Ibryam	17	0	1+14	0	2	0
77	MF	(Ukraine) UKR	Tymur Korablin	14	1	14	1	0	0
90	DF	(Moldova) MDA	Vadim Dijinari	10	2	9+1	2	0	0
98	FW	(Bulgaria) BUL	Valentin Yoskov	30	5	23+7	5	0	0
Player(s) who left on loan but featured this season
44	DF	(Bulgaria) BUL	Angel Granchov	1	1	1	1	0	0
Player(s) who left permanently but featured this season
1	GK	(Ukraine) UKR	Hennadiy Hanyev	2	0	0	0	2	0
8	MF	(Bulgaria) BUL	Steliyan Dobrev	0	0	0	0	0	0
14	MF	(Russia) RUS	Mikhail Gashchuk	1	0	0+1	0	0	0
18	MF	(Bulgaria) BUL	Denislav Hasanov	0	0	0	0	0	0
19	DF	(Bulgaria) BUL	Stoyan Pergelov	5	0	1+2	0	1+1	0
19	FW	(Bulgaria) BUL	Stefan Stefanov	0	0	0	0	0	0
22	DF	(Armenia) ARM	Artur Daniyelyan	4	0	1+3	0	0	0
24	MF	(Ukraine) UKR	Oleksandr Chernozub	4	0	0+3	0	1	0
26	GK	(Bulgaria) BUL	Erik Georgiev	0	0	0	0	0	0
70	FW	(Finland) FIN	Didis Lutumba-Pitah	7	1	1+5	1	1	0
77	FW	(Bulgaria) BUL	Erik Manolkov	7	2	0+6	1	0+1	1
96	MF	(Bulgaria) BUL	Dzhaner Sadetinov	20	0	18	0	2	0
