= 2025–26 PFC Lokomotiv Plovdiv season =

Lokomotiv Plovdiv
2025-26 season
- Chairman: Hristo Krusharski
- Head coach: (Slovenia) Dušan Kosič
- Stadium: Stadion Hristo Bonev
- First Professional Football League (Bulgaria): 5th
- Bulgarian Cup: Runners Up
| Home colours | Away colours | Third colours |

The 2025–26 season will be PFC Lokomotiv Plovdiv 99th season in the clubs history.During this season the club will participate in the following competitions: First Professional Football League (Bulgaria), Bulgarian Cup.

== First-team squad ==
As of 31 August 2026

Note: Flags indicate national team as defined under FIFA eligibility rules; some limited exceptions apply. Players may hold more than one non-FIFA nationality.

| No. | Pos. | Nation | Player |
|---|---|---|---|
| 1 | GK | SUI | Bojan Milosavljević (vice-captain) |
| 2 | DF | VEN | Adrián Cova |
| 3 | DF | FRA | Dalil Ali |
| 4 | DF | ROU | Andrei Chindriș |
| 5 | DF | BUL | Todor Pavlov |
| 6 | MF | SLO | Miha Trdan |
| 7 | MF | BUL | Sevi Idriz |
| 9 | FW | BUL | Aksel Velev |
| 10 | MF | BUL | Yulian Iliev (on loan from CSKA Sofia) |
| 11 | MF | NED | Ryan Leijten |
| 12 | MF | BUL | Efe Ali |
| 13 | DF | BRA | Lucas Ryan |
| 17 | FW | NED | Anton Fase |

| No. | Pos. | Nation | Player |
|---|---|---|---|
| 19 | FW | FRA | Junior Burban |
| 21 | DF | ARG | Enzo Espinoza |
| 22 | MF | BUL | Ivaylo Ivanov |
| 23 | DF | BUL | Martin Ruskov |
| 26 | DF | BUL | Denis Kirashki |
| 29 | FW | CIV | Chris Longville |
| 30 | MF | BUL | Aleksandar Aleksandrov |
| 39 | MF | TJK | Parvizdzhon Umarbayev (captain) |
| 40 | GK | BIH | Petar Zovko |
| 44 | DF | GER | Milan Petrović |
| 94 | DF | BRA | Matheus Brito |
| 99 | FW | FRA | Julien Lamy |

For recent transfers, see List of Bulgarian football transfers summer 2026.

==== Out on loan ====
Note: Flags indicate national team as defined under FIFA eligibility rules; some limited exceptions apply. Players may hold more than one non-FIFA nationality.

| No. | Pos. | Nation | Player |
|---|---|---|---|
| — | MF | BUL | Martin Atanasov (at Rilski Sportist until 31 December 2026) |
| — | FW | BUL | Zapro Dinev (at Beroe until 30 June 2027) |

| No. | Pos. | Nation | Player |
|---|---|---|---|
| — | FW | BUL | Mariyan Vangelov (at Hebar until 30 June 2027) |

== Pre-season and friendlies ==
| 30 June 2025 Freindly | Lokomotiv Plovdiv (Bulgaria) | 0 - 1 | (Bulgaria) Slavia Sofia | Plovdiv |
| 18:00 EET | | Report | Naydenov 90' | Stadium: Stadion Hristo Bonev |

| 5 July 2025 Freindly | Lokomotiv Plovdiv (Bulgaria) | 2 - 2 | (Bulgaria) Arda | Plovdiv |
| 18:30 EET | Francisco Politino 23'; Aksel Velev 76' | Report | Nikolov 22'; Viyachki 52' | Stadium: Stadion Hristo Bonev |

| 9 July 2025 Freindly | Lokomotiv Plovdiv (Bulgaria) | 1 - 1 | (Bulgaria) Lokomotiv Sofia | Plovdiv |
| 18:30 EET | Lamy 57' | Report | Delev 41' | Stadium: Stadion Hristo Bonev |

| 15 July 2025 Freindly | Lokomotiv Plovdiv (Bulgaria) | 1 - 0 | (Bulgaria) Spartak Plovdiv | Plovdiv |
| 19:00 EET | Perea 15' | Report | | Stadium: Stadion Hristo Bonev |

== Competitions ==
| Competition | First match | Last match | Starting round | Final position | Record | | | | | | | |
| Competition | First match | Last match | Starting round | Final position | Pld | W | D | L | GF | GA | GD | Win % |
|---|---|---|---|---|---|---|---|---|---|---|---|---|
| First League | 21 July 2025 | 23 May 2026 | Matchday 1 | 5th | 36 | 14 | 13 | 9 | 36 | 41 | −5 | 38.89 |
| Bulgarian Cup | 28 October 2025 | 20 May 2026 | Runners up | Runners Up | 6 | 4 | 1 | 1 | 15 | 6 | +9 | 66.67 |
| Total | | | | | 42 | 18 | 14 | 10 | 51 | 47 | +4 | 42.86 |

Source: soccerway

=== First League ===
==== Regular stage ====
===== League table =====
| Pos | Team | Pld | W | D | L | GF | GA | GD | Pts | Qualification |
|---|---|---|---|---|---|---|---|---|---|---|
| 3 | CSKA 1948 | 30 | 18 | 5 | 7 | 50 | 31 | +19 | 59 | Qualification for the Championship group |
| 4 | CSKA Sofia | 30 | 16 | 8 | 6 | 43 | 23 | +20 | 56 | Qualification for the Championship group |
| 5 | Lokomotiv Plovdiv | 30 | 11 | 13 | 6 | 30 | 33 | −3 | 46 | Qualification for the Conference League group |
| 6 | Cherno More | 30 | 11 | 11 | 8 | 33 | 26 | +7 | 44 (Note: Head-to-head points: Cherno More 4; Arda 1.) | Qualification for the Conference League group |
| 7 | Arda | 30 | 12 | 8 | 10 | 33 | 27 | +6 | 44 | Qualification for the Conference League group |

Source: Soccerway, Bulgarian Football
Rules for classification: 1) Points; 2) Head-to-head points; 3) Head-to-head goal difference; 4) Head-to-head goals scored; 5) Head-to-head away goals scored (only if two teams); 6) Goal difference; 7) Goals scored; 8) Fairplay ranking; 9) Draw

===== Results summary =====
| Overall | | | | | | | | Home | | | | | | Away | | | | | |
| Pld | W | D | L | GF | GA | GD | Pts | W | D | L | GF | GA | GD | W | D | L | GF | GA | GD |
|---|---|---|---|---|---|---|---|---|---|---|---|---|---|---|---|---|---|---|---|
| 30 | 11 | 13 | 6 | 30 | 33 | −3 | 46 | 8 | 4 | 3 | 14 | 15 | −1 | 3 | 9 | 3 | 16 | 18 | −2 |

Last updated: 23 May 2026.
Source: Bulgarian Football

===== Results by round =====
| Team ╲ Round | 1 | 2 | 3 | 4 | 5 | 6 | 7 | 8 | 9 | 10 |
|---|---|---|---|---|---|---|---|---|---|---|
| Ground | H | A | H | A | H | A | A | H | A | H |
| Result | W | D | W | D | W | | | | | |
| Position | 4 | 5 | 5 | 5 | 4 | | | | | |
| Points | 3 | 4 | 7 | 8 | 11 | | | | | |

Updated to match(es) played on 15 August 2025. Source: Bulgarian Football
A = Away; H = Home; W = Win; D = Draw; L = Loss; P = Postponed

===== Matches =====
| 21 July 2025 1 | Lokomotiv Plovdiv | 1 - 0 | Dobrudzha | Plovdiv |
| 19:00 EET | Iliev 23' (pen.); Enzo Espinoza (yellow card) 27'; Cova (yellow card) 55'; Itu (yellow card) 78' | Report | Jhonatan Cuero (yellow card) 25' | Stadium: Stadion Hristo Bonev; Attendance: 1,300; Referee: (Bulgaria) Dragomir Draganov |

| 28 July 2025 2 | Montana | 1 - 1 | Lokomotiv Plovdiv | Montana |
| 21:15 EET | Ejike 23' (yellow card) 45+1'; Emmanuel Ekele (yellow card) 49'; Iliadis (yellow card) 60' | Report | Itu 36'; Martin Ruskov (yellow card) 38'; Pavlov (yellow card) 79'; Lucas Ryan (yellow card) 90' | Stadium: Stadion Ogosta; Attendance: 700; Referee: (Bulgaria) Martin Velikov |

| 2 August 2025 3 | Lokomotiv Plovdiv | 1 - 0 | CSKA Sofia | Plovdiv |
| 19:00 EET | Cova (yellow card) 56'; Enzo Espinoza (yellow card) 69'; Lamy 89'; Milosavljević (yellow card) 90+8' | Report | Seger (yellow card) 56'; Bytyqi (yellow card) 85' | Stadium: Stadion Hristo Bonev; Attendance: 2,600; Referee: (Bulgaria) Dimitar Dimitrov |

| 11 August 2025 4 | Arda | 0 - 0 | Lokomotiv Plovdiv | Kardzhali |
| 21:15 EET | Vutov (yellow card) 69'; David Idowu (yellow card) 86'; Kovachev (yellow card) 89'; Kotev (yellow card) 90+1' | Report | Politino (yellow card) 33'; Ali (yellow card) 75'; Itu (yellow card) 81'; Umarbayev (yellow card) 84' | Stadium: Arena Arda; Attendance: 2,600; Referee: (Bulgaria) Georgi Davidov |

| 15 August 2025 5 | Lokomotiv Plovdiv | 2 - 1 | Slavia Sofia | Plovdiv |
| 21:15 EET | Ali (yellow card) 43'; Politino 56'; Andreev 90+1' (yellow card) 90+2' | Report | Tasev 84' (pen.) | Stadium: Stadion Hristo Bonev; Attendance: 1,500; Referee: (Bulgaria) Stanimir Trenchev |

=== Conference League group ===
==== Table ====
Points and goals carried over in full from regular season.

| Pos | Team | Pld | W | D | L | GF | GA | GD | Pts | Qualification |
|---|---|---|---|---|---|---|---|---|---|---|
| 5 | Lokomotiv Plovdiv | 36 | 14 | 13 | 9 | 36 | 41 | −5 | 55 | Qualification for the Conference League play-off |
| 6 | Arda | 36 | 15 | 9 | 12 | 42 | 34 | +8 | 54 | |
| 7 | Cherno More | 36 | 14 | 12 | 10 | 40 | 34 | +6 | 54 | |
| 8 | Botev Plovdiv | 36 | 13 | 7 | 16 | 49 | 45 | +4 | 46 | |

Source: soccerway, Bulgarian Football
Rules for classification: 1) Points; 2) Points in regular season and second phase; 3) Head-to-head points in regular season and second phase; 4) Head-to-head goal difference in regular season and second phase; 5) Head-to-head goals scored in regular season and second phase; 6) Head-to-head away goals scored in regular season and second phase (if two teams tied); 7) Goal difference; 8) Goals scored; 9) Fair play ranking; 10) Drawing of lots.

===== Results summary =====
| Overall | | | | | | | | Home | | | | | | Away | | | | | |
| Pld | W | D | L | GF | GA | GD | Pts | W | D | L | GF | GA | GD | W | D | L | GF | GA | GD |
|---|---|---|---|---|---|---|---|---|---|---|---|---|---|---|---|---|---|---|---|
| 0 | 0 | 0 | 0 | 0 | 0 | 0 | 0 | 0 | 0 | 0 | 0 | 0 | 0 | 0 | 0 | 0 | 0 | 0 | 0 |

Source: Bulgarian Football

===== Results by round =====
| Round | 1 |
|---|---|
| Ground | |
| Result | |
| Position | |
| Points | |

Source: Bulgarian Football
A = Away; H = Home; W = Win; D = Draw; L = Loss; P = Postponed

===== Matches =====
| - |

=== Bulgarian Cup ===
==== Results summary ====
| Overall | | | | | | | | Home | | | | | | Away | | | | | |
| Pld | W | D | L | GF | GA | GD | Pts | W | D | L | GF | GA | GD | W | D | L | GF | GA | GD |
|---|---|---|---|---|---|---|---|---|---|---|---|---|---|---|---|---|---|---|---|
| 0 | 0 | 0 | 0 | 0 | 0 | 0 | 0 | 0 | 0 | 0 | 0 | 0 | 0 | 0 | 0 | 0 | 0 | 0 | 0 |

Source: Bulgarian Football

==== Matches ====
| - |
