= 2025–26 Bulgarian Cup =

Sesame Купа на България
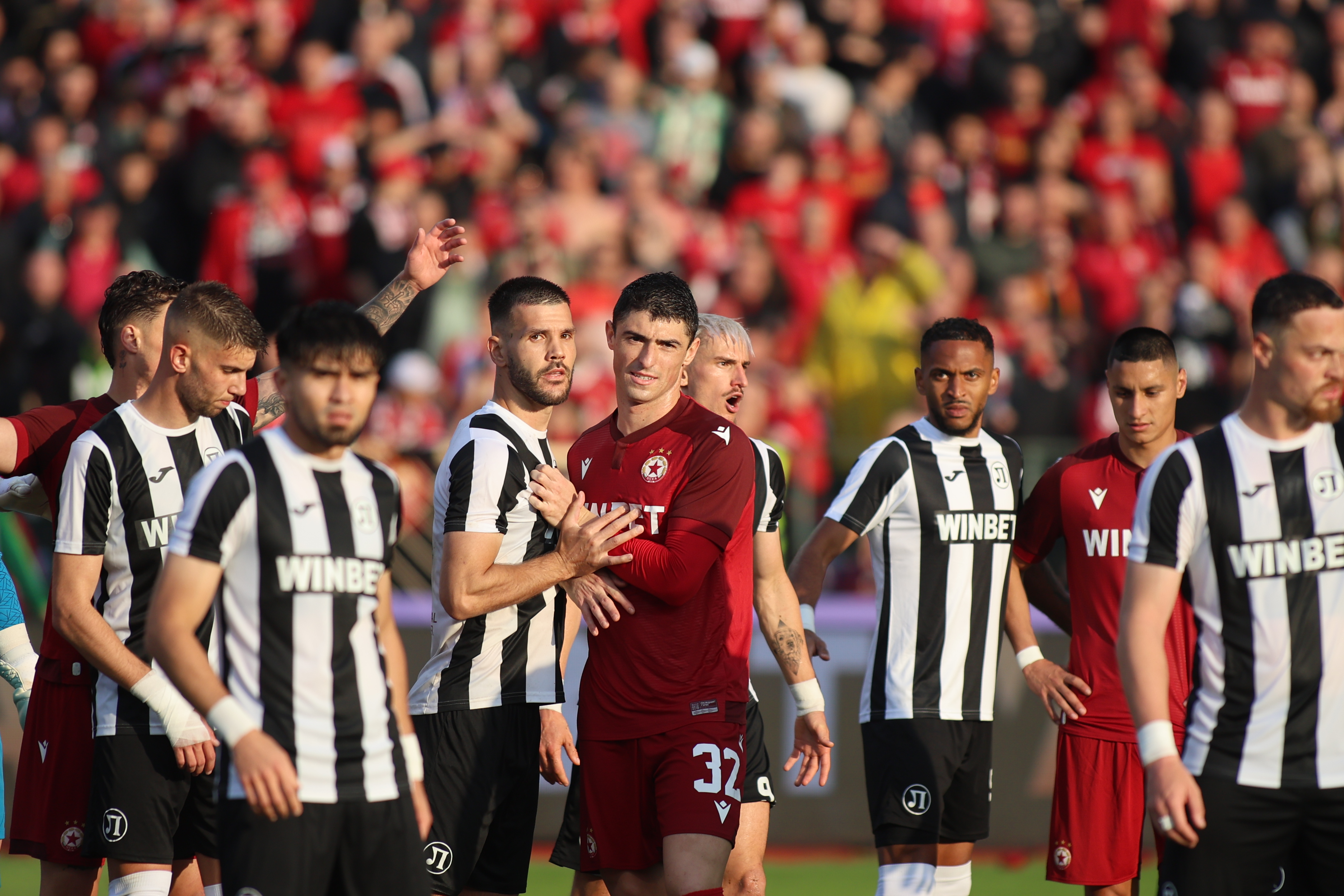

Tournament details
- Country: Bulgaria
- Teams: 47

Final positions
- Champions: CSKA Sofia (22nd title)
- Runners-up: Lokomotiv Plovdiv

Tournament statistics
- Matches played: 48
- Goals scored: 163 (3.4 per match)
- Top goal scorer(s): (Romania) Cătălin Itu (4 goals)

The 2025–26 Bulgarian Cup was the 44th official edition of the Bulgarian annual football knockout tournament. It was sponsored by Sesame and known as the Sesame Kupa na Bulgaria for sponsorship purposes. The competition began on 11 October 2025 with the preliminary round and finished with the final on 20 May 2026. Ludogorets Razgrad were the defending cup winners but lost in the semi-finals against the eventual winners, CSKA Sofia, who won their 22nd cup in history and qualified for the first qualifying round of the 2026–27 UEFA Europa League.

== Participating clubs ==
The following 47 teams qualified for the competition:

2025–26 First League; 16 clubs	2025–26 Second League; 15 non-reserve clubs	Winners of 4 regional competitions 16 clubs
Arda; Beroe; Botev Plovdiv; Botev Vratsa; CSKA 1948; CSKA Sofia; Cherno More; Dobrudzha; Levski Sofia; Lokomotiv Plovdiv; Lokomotiv Sofia; Ludogorets Razgrad; Montana; Septemvri Sofia; Slavia Sofia; Spartak Varna	Belasitsa; Chernomorets Burgas; Dunav Ruse; Etar; Fratria Varna; Hebar; Lokomotiv Gorna Oryahovitsa; Marek; Minyor Pernik; Pirin Blagoevgrad; Sevlievo; Spartak Pleven; Sportist Svoge; Vihren; Yantra	from North-East zone: Benkovski Isperih; Botev Novi Pazar; Chernolomets Popovo; Septemvri Tervel; from North-West zone: Bdin Vidin; Lovech; Kom; Partizan Cherven Bryag; from South-West zone: Germanea; Metalurg Pernik; Rilski Sportist; Vitosha Bistritsa; from South-East zone: Haskovo; Spartak Plovdiv; Yambol; Zagorets

== Preliminary round ==
The draw was conducted on 26 September 2025. In this stage, the participants are 15 winners from the regional amateur competitions and 15 non-reserve teams from the Second League. The games were played on 11 and 12 October 2025.

Zagorets received a bye to the Round of 32.

11 October 2025	Rilski Sportist (III)	2–1	Belasitsa (II)	Samokov
15:00 UTC+3	Panchev 74'; Dokovski 87'	Report	Bozhinov 80'	Stadium: Stadion Iskar; Referee: Antonio Antov (Kyustendil)

11 October 2025	Yambol (III)	2–1	Vihren (II)	Straldzha (Note: Yambol played their preliminary round home match at Gradski stadion, Straldzha, instead of their regular stadium, Stadion Tundzha in Yambol.)
15:00 UTC+3	Bozev 24'; Prindzhev 57'	Report	Bashliev 72'	Stadium: Gradski stadion Referee: Stefan Gurkov (Sliven)

12 October 2025	Metalurg Pernik (IV)	1–8	Hebar (II)	Pernik
15:00 UTC+3	Mitkov 44'	Report	Angelov 8'; Petrov 17', 22'; Pavlov 37', 68', 82'; Radev 52'; Haydarov 82'	Stadium: Stadion Metalurg; Referee: Murad Adem (Sofia)

12 October 2025	Germanea (III)	0–4	Fratria Varna (II)	Sapareva Banya
15:00 UTC+3		Report	Brikner 64'; Druiventak 78', 85'; Manolkov 88'	Stadium: Gradski stadion Referee: Ivo Ivanov (Sofia)

12 October 2025	Benkovski Isperih (III)	0–4	Dunav Ruse (II)	Isperih
15:00 UTC+3		Report	Kelyovluev 40'; Statev 56'; El Bakkali 61', 76'	Stadium: Gradski stadion Referee: Krasimir Krastev (Shumen)

12 October 2025	Septemvri Tervel (III)	0–3	Marek (II)	Tervel
15:00 UTC+3		Report	Yordanov 35'; Dzhadzharov 45+2', 56'	Stadium: Stadion Septemvri; Referee: Kristiyan Todorov (Varna)

12 October 2025	Vitosha Bistritsa (III)	2–1	Lokomotiv Gorna Oryahovitsa (II)	Bistritsa
15:00 UTC+3	Sarafski 87', 90+4'	Report	Kolev 90+6'	Stadium: Stadion Bistritsa; Referee: Lyubomir Vushovski (Sofia)

12 October 2025	Haskovo (III)	0–4	Spartak Pleven (II)	Haskovo
15:00 UTC+3		Report	Velkov 35'; Trifonov 57'; Tairov 85'; Antonov 90+3'	Stadium: Stadion Haskovo; Referee: Petar Asparuhov (Burgas)

12 October 2025	Botev Novi Pazar (III)	1–4 (a.e.t.)	Sportist Svoge (II)	Kaspichan (Note: Botev Novi Pazar played their preliminary round home match at Gradski stadion, Kaspichan, instead of their regular stadium, Gradski stadion in Novi Pazar.)
15:00 UTC+3	Shyukryu 79'	Report	Monteiro 83'; Gelin 103'; Ivanov 110'; Pinheiro 119'	Stadium: Gradski stadion Referee: Boris Popov (Ruse)

12 October 2025	Lovech (III)	0–5	Chernomorets Burgas (II)	Lovech
15:00 UTC+3		Report	Essouma 3'; Kostadinov 20'; Chavorski 52'; Tsonev 54'; Hyusein 86'	Stadium: Gradski stadion Referee: Petar Dimitrov (Sofia)

12 October 2025	Kom (III)	0–1 (a.e.t.)	Yantra (II)	Berkovitsa
15:00 UTC+3		Report	Angelov 118'	Stadium: Stadion Mramor; Referee: Vladimir Kirilov (Pleven)

12 October 2025	Partizan Cherven Bryag (III)	0–2	Minyor Pernik (II)	Cherven Bryag
15:00 UTC+3		Report	Mihaylov 70'; Vutsov 90+2' (pen.)	Stadium: Gradski stadion Referee: Bozhidar Todorov (Sofia)

12 October 2025	Chernolomets Popovo (III)	2–4 (a.e.t.)	Sevlievo (II)	Popovo
15:00 UTC+3	Remzi 40'; Georgiev 62'	Report	Makaveev 50' (pen.), 94'; Ganev 53'; Kolev 109'	Stadium: Stadion Stamo Kostov; Referee: Stanimir Todorov (Gabrovo)

12 October 2025	Bdin Vidin (III)	2–1	Etar (II)	Vidin
15:00 UTC+3	João Stocco 38'; Zahariev 59'	Report	Ivanchov 75' (o.g.)	Stadium: Stadion Georgi Benkovski; Referee: Hristofor Petkov (Lovech)

12 October 2025	Spartak Plovdiv (III)	2–1	Pirin Blagoevgrad (II)	Plovdiv
15:00 UTC+3	Bakalov 83', 85'	Report	Vangelov 45+2'	Stadium: Stadion Todor Diev; Referee: Stanislav Apostolov (Pazardzhik)

== Round of 32 ==
The draw for this stage was conducted on 26 September 2025. The participants are the 16 preliminary round winners and the 16 First League teams. The games will be played between 28 October and 30 October 2025.

28 October 2025	Spartak Pleven (II)	0–4	Botev Plovdiv (I)	Pleven
12:45 UTC+2		Report	Iliev 11' (pen.); Kalu 40'; Soldo 50'; Mitkov 77'	Stadium: Stadion Pleven; Referee: Mihael Pavlov (Veliko Tarnovo)

28 October 2025	Bdin Vidin (III)	2–7	Dobrudzha (I)	Vidin
13:30 UTC+2	Zahariev 27'; João Stocco 88'	Report	Cuero 7'; Ramadan 14', 52', 80'; Angelov 53', 55'; Cardoso 59'	Stadium: Stadion Georgi Benkovski; Referee: Ivaylo Nenkov (Sofia)

28 October 2025	Rilski Sportist (III)	2–3	Lokomotiv Sofia (I)	Samokov
13:30 UTC+2	Hristov 6', 60'	Report	Dembélé 30'; Galchev 66'; Cauê Caruso 90'	Stadium: Stadion Iskar; Referee: Ventsislav Mitrev (Sofia)

28 October 2025	Yambol (III)	1–3	Spartak Varna (I)	Yambol
13:30 UTC+2	Dinkov 82'	Report	Pahama 8'; Halachev 18'; Aleksiev 55'	Stadium: Stadion Tundzha; Referee: Stanimir Todorov (Gabrovo)

28 October 2025	Fratria Varna (II)	1–2	Arda (I)	Varna
15:45 UTC+2	Marinov 50'	Report	Hüseynov 42'; Shinyashiki 64'	Stadium: Stadion Spartak; Referee: Denislav Stalev (Plovdiv)

28 October 2025	Dunav Ruse (II)	1–2 (a.e.t.)	Lokomotiv Plovdiv (I)	Ruse
18:45 UTC+2	Apostolov 89'	Report	Itu 90+7'; Perea 115'	Stadium: Gradski stadion Referee: Stoyan Arsov (Sofia)

29 October 2025	Minyor Pernik (II)	0–3	Cherno More (I)	Pernik
12:00 UTC+2		Report	França 52' (pen.); Celso Sidney 70', 80'	Stadium: Stadion Minyor; Referee: Martin Markov (Sofia)

29 October 2025	Marek (II)	1–4	Montana (I)	Dupnitsa
13:30 UTC+2	Nikolov 83'	Report	Vitinho 59'; Dimitrov 62', 72'; Tsekov 75'	Stadium: Stadion Bonchuk; Referee: Volen Chinkov (Sofia)

29 October 2025	Spartak Plovdiv (III)	1–2	Slavia Sofia (I)	Plovdiv
13:30 UTC+2	Dimov 35'	Report	Balov 28'; Georgiev 49'	Stadium: Stadion Todor Diev; Referee: Dragomir Draganov (Varna)

29 October 2025	Sportist Svoge (II)	0–2	Septemvri Sofia (I)	Svoge
13:30 UTC+2		Report	Fourrier 8'; Ivanov 42'	Stadium: Stadion Chavdar Tsvetkov; Referee: Gero Piskov (Sofia)

29 October 2025	Sevlievo (II)	1–2	CSKA Sofia (I)	Sevlievo
13:30 UTC+2	Petrov 66'	Report	Sanyang 38'; Brahimi 60'	Stadium: Stadion Rakovski; Referee: Stanimir Trenchev (Sofia)

29 October 2025	Vitosha Bistritsa (III)	0–0 (a.e.t.) (4–3 p)	Beroe (I)	Bistritsa
13:30 UTC+2		Report		Stadium: Stadion Bistritsa; Referee: Antonio Antov (Kyustendil)
	Penalties
	Spasov (penalty scored); Charlov (penalty scored); Yanakiev (penalty scored); Petrov (penalty missed); Bakalov (penalty scored)		(penalty scored) Salomoni; (penalty scored) Alarcón; (penalty scored) Caio Lopes; (penalty missed) Pineda; (penalty missed) Costantini

29 October 2025	Zagorets (III)	1–4	Botev Vratsa (I)	Nova Zagora
13:30 UTC+2	Stoilov 47'	Report	Stoyanov 79'; Smolenski 80', 88'; Genov 84'	Stadium: Stadion Zagorets; Referee: Kristiyan Todorov (Varna)

29 October 2025	Hebar (II)	0–3	Levski Sofia (I)	Pazardzhik
16:30 UTC+2		Report	Serafimov 2'; Petkov 29'; Bouras 61'	Stadium: Stadion Georgi Benkovski; Referee: Lyuboslav Lyubomirov (Pernik)

30 October 2025	Chernomorets Burgas (II)	2–3	Ludogorets Razgrad (I)	Nesebar (Note: Chernomorets Burgas played their Round of 32 home match at Stadion Nesebar, Nesebar, instead of their regular stadium, Stadion Ivan Pritargov in Burgas.)
13:30 UTC+2	Staykov 8'; Dramé 90+1'	Report	Shishkov 19'; Yordanov 60'; Chochev 90+4'	Stadium: Stadion Nesebar; Referee: Krasen Georgiev (Varna)

30 October 2025	Yantra (II)	0–4	CSKA 1948 (I)	Gabrovo
16:30 UTC+2		Report	Tsonev 8', 50'; Rusev 83'; Zé Vitor 88'	Stadium: Stadion Hristo Botev; Referee: Vasil Minev (Sofia)

== Round of 16 ==
The draw for this stage was conducted on 5 November 2025. The participants are the 16 Round of 32 winners. The games will be played between 11 and 15 December 2025.

11 December 2025	Levski Sofia (I)	3–0	Vitosha Bistritsa (III)	Sofia
17:30 UTC+2	Gyonov 11' (o.g.); Kirilov 51'; Petkov 64'	Report		Stadium: Stadion Georgi Asparuhov; Referee: Kristiyan Kolev (Plovdiv)

12 December 2025	Cherno More (I)	0–3	Arda (I)	Varna
17:30 UTC+2		Report	Shinyashiki 28'; Patrick Luan 51'; Eboa Eboa 54'	Stadium: Stadion Ticha; Referee: Georgi Davidov (Veliko Tarnovo)

13 December 2025	Slavia Sofia (I)	2–3 (a.e.t.)	CSKA 1948 (I)	Sofia
12:00 UTC+2	Sheytanov 2' (o.g.); Stoev 73'	Report	Diallo 45' (pen.), 90+3'; Elias Franco 113'	Stadium: Stadion Aleksandar Shalamanov; Referee: Martin Velikov (Varna)

13 December 2025	Spartak Varna (I)	0–2	Botev Plovdiv (I)	Varna
15:00 UTC+2		Report	Oko-Flex 30'; Mascote 39'	Stadium: Stadion Spartak; Referee: Vasil Minev (Sofia)

13 December 2025	CSKA Sofia (I)	2–1	Lokomotiv Sofia (I)	Sofia
18:00 UTC+2	Dembélé 29' (o.g.); Jordão 69'	Report	Delev 6'	Stadium: Natsionalen stadion Vasil Levski (Note: CSKA Sofia play their home matches at Natsionalen stadion Vasil Levski, Sofia, instead of their regular stadium, Stadion Balgarska Armia, Sofia, which is undergoing a major reconstruction.); Referee: Mariyan Grebencharski (Samokov)

14 December 2025	Dobrudzha (I)	0–0 (a.e.t.) (3–4 p)	Botev Vratsa (I)	Dobrich
13:00 UTC+2		Report		Stadium: Stadion Druzhba; Referee: Georgi Kabakov (Plovdiv)
	Penalties
	Cardoso (penalty scored); Leoni (penalty missed); Pirgov (penalty scored); Hasan (penalty missed); Fall (penalty scored)		(penalty scored) Tsonev; (penalty missed) Stoyanov; (penalty scored) Petkov; (penalty scored) Goranov; (penalty scored) Genov

14 December 2025	Lokomotiv Plovdiv (I)	4–0	Montana (I)	Plovdiv
16:00 UTC+2	Perea 26', 34'; Ali 40'; Itu 59'	Report		Stadium: Stadion Lokomotiv; Referee: Todor Kirov (Varna)

15 December 2025	Septemvri Sofia (I)	1–3	Ludogorets Razgrad (I)	Sofia
17:30 UTC+2	Stoichkov 77'	Report	Duah 7', 56'; Erick Marcus 11'	Stadium: Stadion Lokomotiv (Note: Septemvri Sofia play their home matches at Stadion Lokomotiv, Sofia, instead of their regular stadium, Stadion Dragalevtsi, Sofia, which does not meet BFU requirements.); Referee: Dimitar Dimitrov (Sofia)

== Quarter-finals ==
The draw was conducted on 18 December 2025. In this stage the participants are the 8 winners from the previous round. The games will be played between 10 and 12 February 2026.

10 February 2026	CSKA Sofia	2–0	CSKA 1948	Sofia
18:00 UTC+2	Pittas 8'; Ebong 74'	Report		Stadium: Natsionalen stadion Vasil Levski; Referee: Radoslav Gidzhenov (Plovdiv)

11 February 2026	Botev Vratsa	2–3	Arda	Vratsa
15:00 UTC+2	Tsonev 25' (pen.); Sanyang 27'	Report	Eboa Eboa 5'; Paskalev 36'; Kotev 51'	Stadium: Stadion Hristo Botev; Referee: Dragomir Draganov (Varna)

11 February 2026	Ludogorets Razgrad	1–0	Levski Sofia	Razgrad
18:00 UTC+2	Caio Vidal 7'	Report		Stadium: Huvepharma Arena; Attendance: 4,358; Referee: Volen Chinkov (Sofia)

12 February 2026	Lokomotiv Plovdiv	1–0	Botev Plovdiv	Plovdiv
15:30 UTC+2	Umarbayev 7'	Report		Stadium: Stadion Lokomotiv; Referee: Georgi Kabakov (Plovdiv)

== Semi-finals ==
The draw was conducted on 18 February 2026. The first legs are to be played on 21 and 22 April, while the second legs are scheduled for 29 and 30 April 2026. This is a revision of the originally planned dates to avoid a clash with the parliamentary elections in April.

=== First legs ===
21 April 2026	Ludogorets Razgrad	1–2	CSKA Sofia	Razgrad
19:00 UTC+3	Duah 18'	Report	Pittas 81'; Godoy 85'	Stadium: Huvepharma Arena; Referee: Kristiyan Kolev (Plovdiv)

22 April 2026	Arda	0–4	Lokomotiv Plovdiv	Kardzhali
19:00 UTC+3		Report	Itu 52'; Idriz 63'; Chorbadzhiyski 89'; Velkovski 90+2' (o.g.)	Stadium: Arena Arda; Referee: Mariyan Grebencharski (Samokov)

=== Second legs ===
29 April 2026	CSKA Sofia	0–0 (2–1 agg.)	Ludogorets Razgrad	Sofia
19:00 UTC+3		Report		Stadium: Natsionalen stadion Vasil Levski; Referee: Gero Piskov (Sofia)

30 April 2026	Lokomotiv Plovdiv	1–1 (5–1 agg.)	Arda	Plovdiv
19:00 UTC+3	Itu 16'	Report	Kotev 65'	Stadium: Stadion Lokomotiv; Referee: Lyuboslav Lyubomirov (Pernik)

== Final ==
20 May 2026
19:00 UTC+3

Lokomotiv Plovdiv	1–1 (a.e.t.)	CSKA Sofia
Lucas Ryan 47'	Report	Godoy 11'
Penalties
Iliev (penalty missed); Lucas Ryan (penalty scored); Chindriș (penalty scored); Zwarts (penalty scored); Dinev (penalty missed)	3−4	(penalty missed) Jordão; (penalty scored) Ebong; (penalty scored) Ivanov; (penalty scored) Godoy; (penalty scored) Eto'o

Natsionalen stadion Vasil Levski, Sofia
Attendance: 32,000
Referee: Mariyan Grebencharski (Samokov)
