= Didis Lutumba-Pitah =

Finnish footballer (born 1998)

Personal information
- Date of birth: 13 November 1998 (age 27)
- Place of birth: Finland
- Height: 1.68 m (5 ft 6 in)
- Position: Winger

Team information
- Current team: Fratria
- Number: 70

Youth career
- –2014: PK-35
- 2015–2016: Honka
- 2017–2018: HJK

Senior career*
Years	Team	Apps	(Gls)
2015–2016	Honka II	18	(9)
2016	Honka	0	(0)
2017–2018	Klubi 04	38	(11)
2019	AC Kajaani	11	(0)
2021	RoPS	29	(1)
2022	HIFK	19	(1)
2023	Hegelmann	34	(2)
2024	Etar	35	(4)
2025–	Fratria	6	(1)
- * Club domestic league appearances and goals as of 20:27, 6 December 2025 (UTC)

Didis Lutumba-Pitah (born 13 November 1998) is a Finnish professional footballer playing as a winger for Fratria. Besides his native Finland, Lutumba-Pitah has played in Lithuania and Bulgaria.

== Club career ==
Lutumba-Pitah played in the youth sectors of PK-35 and FC Honka, before debuting at a senior level with Honka's reserve team in 2015 in lower divisions. He went on to join HJK Helsinki and continued with the club's reserve team Klubi 04 in the third-tier Kakkonen and in the second-tier Ykkönen.

On 5 February 2021, he signed with Ykkönen club Rovaniemen Palloseura (RoPS) and joined his former Klubi 04 coach Mikko Mannila.

On 23 February 2022, Lutumba-Pitah joined HIFK in Veikkausliiga, and made his league debut in the 2022 season. After the relegation at the end of the season, Lutumba-Pitah left HIFK.

In January 2023, he moved to Lithuania after signing with FC Hegelmann in the country's top-tier A Lyga. During the season, he also represented the club in the UEFA Europa Conference League qualifiers.

In January 2024, Lutumba-Pitah joined Etar Veliko Tarnovo in Bulgarian First League. He contributed in 15 league appearances and scored two goals during the latter half of the season, but eventually the club were relegated to Bulgarian Second League.

In October 2025 he joined Fratria.

== Personal life ==
Lutumba-Pitah is of Congolese descent. His younger brother Joslyn Luyeye-Lutumba is also a professional footballer for Veikkausliiga club KuPS.

== Career statistics ==
As of 16 December 2024

Appearances and goals by club, season and competition
Club	Season	Division	League		Cup (Note: Includes Suomen Cup and Lithuanian Cup)		League cup		Europe		Total	
Club	Season	Division	Apps	Goals	Apps	Goals	Apps	Goals	Apps	Goals	Apps	Goals
Honka Akatemia	2015	Nelonen	3	5	–		–		–		3	5
Honka Akatemia	2016	Kolmonen	15	4	4	4	–		–		19	8
Honka Akatemia	Total		18	9	4	4	0	0	0	0	22	13
Klubi 04	2017	Kakkonen	22	8	0	0	–		–		22	8
Klubi 04	2018	Ykkönen	17	3	0	0	–		–		17	3
Klubi 04	Total		39	11	0	0	0	0	0	0	39	11
AC Kajaani	2019	Ykkönen	16	0	1	1	–		–		17	1
RoPS	2021	Ykkönen	29	1	4	1	–		–		33	2
HIFK	2022	Veikkausliiga	18	1	5	4	4 (Note: Includes Finnish League Cup)	0	–		27	5
Hegelmann	2023	A Lyga	34	2	2	0	–		2 (Note: Includes UEFA Europa Conference League)	0	38	2
Etar	2023–24	Bulgarian First League	15	2	0	0	–		–		15	2
Etar	2024–25	Bulgarian Second League	20	2	0	0	–		–		20	2
Etar	Total		35	4	0	0	0	0	0	0	35	4
Career total			189	28	16	10	4	0	2	0	211	38
