= Ayvan Angelov =

Bulgarian footballer (born 2003)

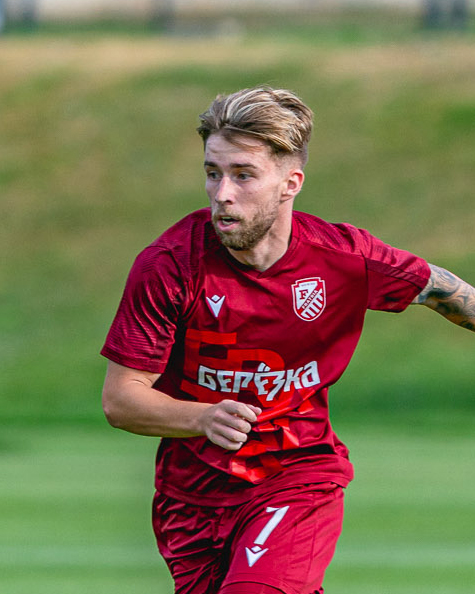
- Ayvan while playing for Fratria in 2025.

Personal information
- Full name: Ayvan Rosenov Angelov
- Date of birth: 10 October 2003 (age 23)
- Place of birth: Lovech, Bulgaria
- Height: 1.68 m (5 ft 6 in)
- Position: Midfielder

Team information
- Current team: Yantra Gabrovo
- Number: 10

Youth career
- 2009–2015: Litex Lovech
- 2015–2020: Levski Sofia

Senior career*
Years	Team	Apps	(Gls)
2020	Spartak Pleven	16	(4)
2021	Belasitsa Petrich	15	(4)
2021	Lokomotiv Plovdiv	11	(0)
2022	Belasitsa Petrich	33	(10)
2023	CSKA 1948 III	6	(1)
2023–2024	CSKA 1948 II	12	(1)
2023	→ Spartak Varna (loan)	17	(0)
2024–2025	Yantra Gabrovo	48	(8)
2025–2026	Fratria	27	(2)
2026–	Yantra Gabrovo	13	(0)
- * Club domestic league appearances and goals as of 04:18, 31 October 2026 (UTC)

Ayvan Angelov (Bulgarian: Айвън Ангелов; born 10 October 2003) is a Bulgarian professional footballer who plays as a midfielder for Yantra Gabrovo.

== Career ==
Born in Lovech, he started his career in the local Litex Lovech, before joining Levski Sofia Academy in 2015. He moved to Belasitsa Petrich in 2021, where he made his debut in the league. On 16 June 2021, he went on a successful trial with Lokomotiv Plovdiv and joined the club. He made his professional league debut with the club and also his debut in UEFA Europa Conference League. On 17 February 2022, he returned in Belasitsa. He had an important role for Belasitsa in their winning of Third League and returning in the professional football.

On 23 November 2022, he signed with CSKA 1948 and played in second and third team. On 17 July 2023, he was sent on loan to Spartak Varna.

In January 2024, his loan ended and his contract with CSKA 1948 ended by mutual agreement to join Yantra Gabrovo.

On 19 June 2025, he officially signed a contract with Fratria for undisclosed fee.

== Career statistics ==
=== Club ===
As of 26 May 2026

Club performance			League		Cup		Continental		Other		Total	
Club	League	Season	Apps	Goals	Apps	Goals	Apps	Goals	Apps	Goals	Apps	Goals
Bulgaria			League		Bulgarian Cup		Europe		Other		Total	
Belasitsa Petrich	Third League	2020–21	4	0	0	0	–		–		4	0
Lokomotiv Plovdiv	First League	2021–22	12	0	2	0	2	0	–		16	0
Belasitsa Petrich	Third League	2021–22	18	9	0	0	–		–		18	9
Belasitsa Petrich	Second League	2022–23	15	1	0	0	–		–		15	1
Belasitsa Petrich	Total		33	10	0	0	0	0	0	0	33	10
CSKA 1948 III	Third League	2022–23	6	1	–		–		–		6	1
CSKA 1948 II	Second League	2022–23	12	1	–		–		–		12	1
Spartak Varna (loan)	Second League	2023–24	17	0	2	0	–		–		19	0
Yantra Gabrovo	Second League	2023–24	13	2	0	0	–		–		13	2
Yantra Gabrovo	Second League	2024–25	35	6	1	0	–		–		36	1
Yantra Gabrovo	Total		48	8	1	0	0	0	0	0	49	8
Fratria	Second League	2025–26	27	2	1	0	–		–		28	2
Fratria	Total		27	2	1	0	0	0	0	0	28	2
Career statistics			159	22	6	0	2	0	0	0	167	22
