= Anton Bakalov =

Bulgarian footballer

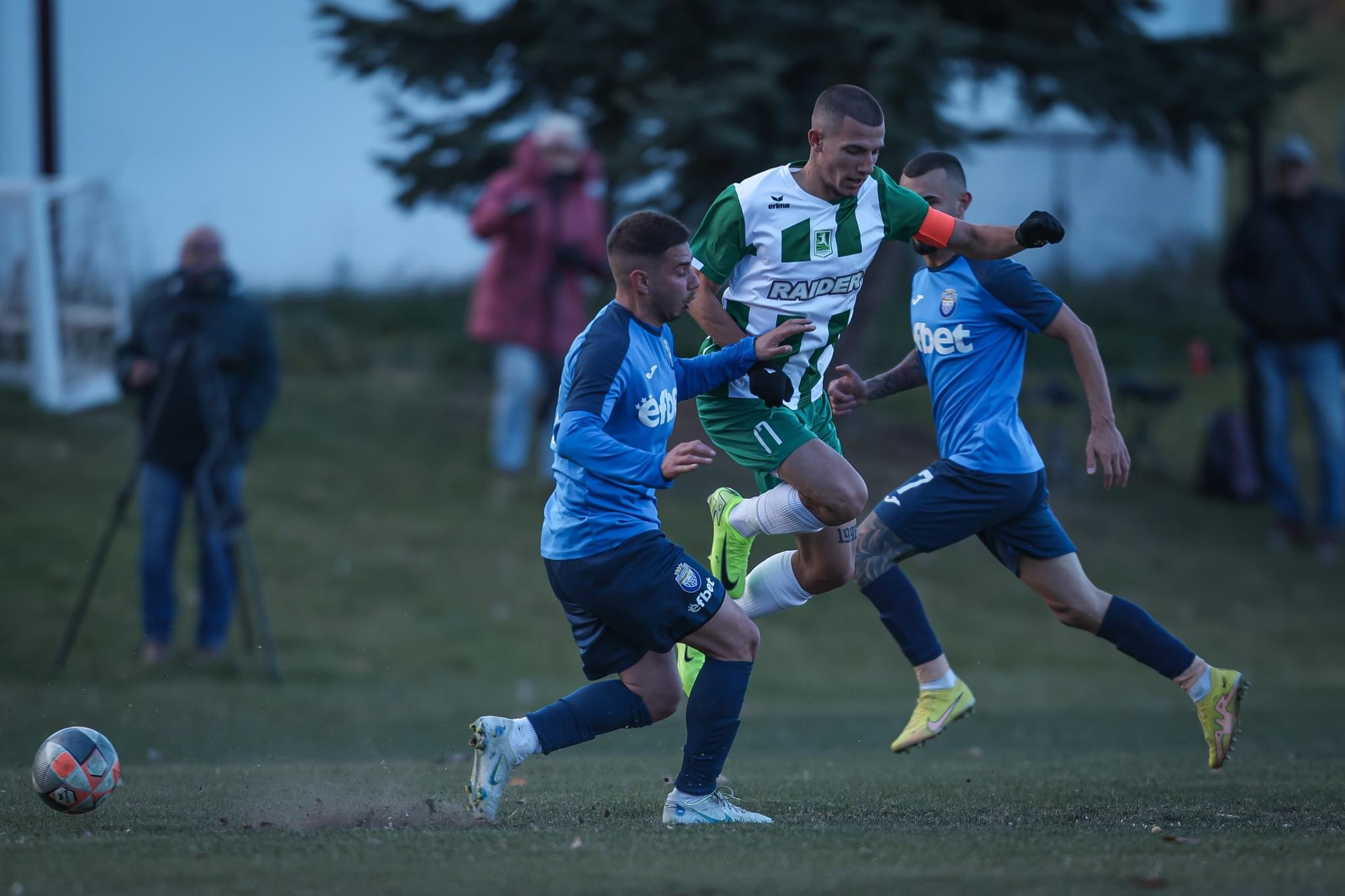

Personal information
- Full name: Anton Angelov Bakalov
- Date of birth: 26 February 2003 (age 23)
- Place of birth: Sofia, Bulgaria
- Height: 1.83 m (6 ft 0 in)
- Position: Forward

Team information
- Current team: Vitosha Bistritsa
- Number: 17

Youth career
- National Sofia
- CSKA 1948

Senior career*
Years	Team	Apps	(Gls)
2021–2024	CSKA 1948 III	41	(8)
2021–2024	CSKA 1948 II	7	(2)
2021–2024	CSKA 1948	1	(0)
2024	National Sofia	10	(9)
2025	Levski Sofia II	18	(4)
2025–	Vitosha Bistritsa	16	(6)

International career
2019	Bulgaria U17	3	(0)
- * Club domestic league appearances and goals as of 09:51, 16 December 2025 (UTC)

Anton Bakalov (Bulgarian: Антон Бакалов; born 26 February 2003) is a Bulgarian footballer who plays nowadays as a forward for Vitosha Bistritsa.

== Career ==
Anton Bakalov began his youth career at National Sofia, before joinining FC CSKA 1948 II. He signed a contract and an assistant for Anton made his debut for the first team of FC CSKA 1948 (2021–2024) After one half season maintaining form at his hometown club National Sofia, Bakalov received an offer and decided to continue his development at Levski Sofia II.

== International career ==
In 2019 he was part of Bulgaria U16 team. Later the same year he received a call up for Bulgaria U17. In August 2021 he was called up for the Bulgaria U19 team.
