= Hennadiy Hanyev =

Ukrainian footballer

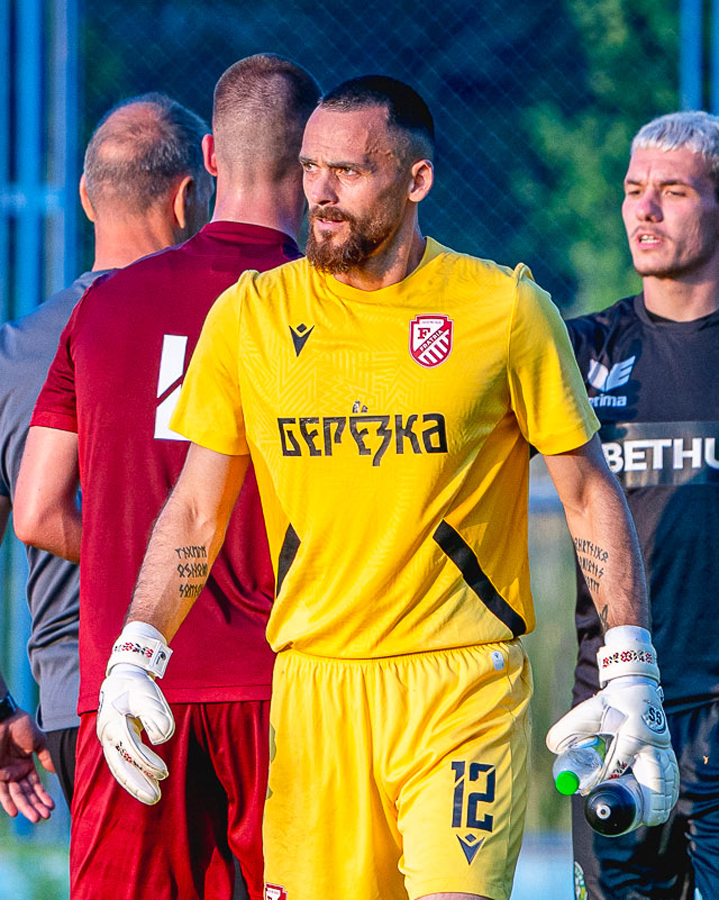
- Hanyev playing for Fratria in 2025.

Personal information
- Full name: Hennadiy Yuriyovych Hanyev
- Date of birth: 15 May 1990 (age 36)
- Place of birth: Sarata, Soviet Union (now Ukraine)
- Height: 1.88 m (6 ft 2 in)
- Position: Goalkeeper

Team information
- Current team: Sevlievo
- Number: 1

Youth career
- 199?–2003: Zorya
- 2003–2007: Chornomorets Odesa

Senior career*
| Years | Team | Apps | (Gls) |
| 2009–2012 | Chornomorets Odesa | 1 | (0) |
| 2010–2011 | → Chornomorets-2 Odesa | 28 | (0) |
| 2012 | Nyva Vinnytsia | 12 | (0) |
| 2012–2014 | Stal Alchevsk | 45 | (0) |
| 2015–2016 | Hirnyk Kryvyi Rih | 28 | (0) |
| 2016 | Zirka Kropyvnytskyi | 1 | (0) |
| 2017–2018 | Inhulets Petrove | 54 | (0) |
| 2019 | Vereya | 6 | (0) |
| 2019 | Dunav Ruse | 0 | (0) |
| 2020–2022 | Beroe Stara Zagora | 45 | (0) |
| 2022–2024 | CSKA 1948 Sofia II | 32 | (0) |
| 2022–2024 | CSKA 1948 Sofia | 7 | (0) |
| 2024–2025 | Lokomotiv GO | 30 | (0) |
| 2025 | Fratria | 0 | (0) |
| 2026– | Sevlievo | 14 | (0) |
- * Club domestic league appearances and goals as of 11 June 2026

Hennadiy Hanyev (Ukrainian: Геннадій Ганєв; born 15 May 1990) is a Ukrainian professional footballer who plays as a goalkeeper for Bulgarian Second League club Sevlievo.

== Career ==
He is the product of Youth Sportive School in his native village Zorya and FC Chornomorets Odesa. His first trainers were Vasyl Zlatov and Anton Kucherevskyi. From summer 2012 he played for FC Stal Alchevsk. In June 2022, Hanyev joined CSKA 1948 Sofia.

On 16 July 2025 he signed for Bulgarian club Fratria.

== Personal life ==
Hanyev is of Bessarabian Bulgarian descent.
