= Viktor Mitev =

Bulgarian footballer

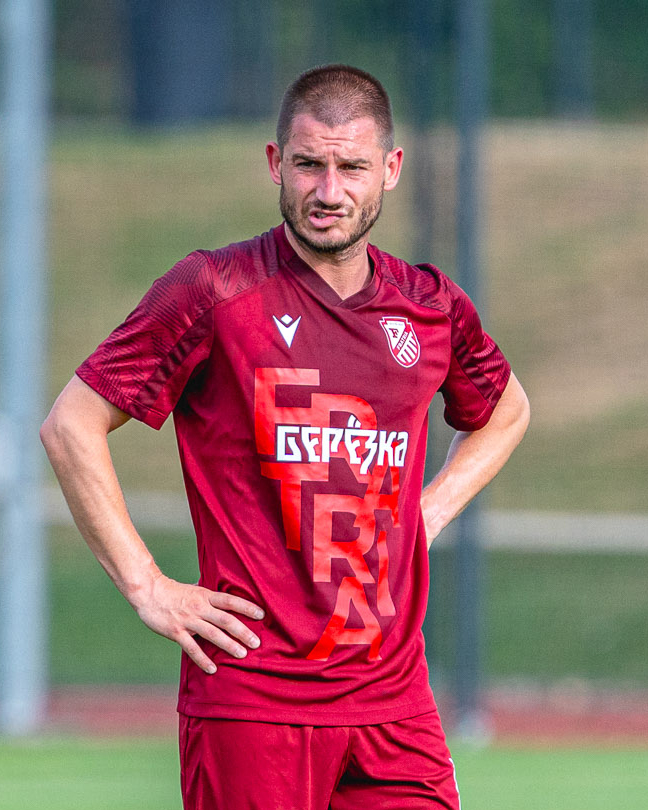
- Mitev while playing for Fratria in 2025.

Personal information
- Full name: Viktor Stefanov Mitev
- Date of birth: 15 February 1992 (age 34)
- Place of birth: Varna, Bulgaria
- Height: 1.76 m (5 ft 9 in)
- Positions: Left winger; left back

Team information
- Current team: Dobrudzha
- Number: 11

Youth career
- Cherno More

Senior career*
Years	Team	Apps	(Gls)
2010–2013	Cherno More	6	(0)
2012	→ Kaliakra (loan)	10	(1)
2013	Dunav Ruse	9	(2)
2013	Spartak Varna	10	(0)
2014	Lyubimets 2007	15	(0)
2014–2020	Chernomorets Balchik	131	(24)
2020–2021	Lokomotiv GO	26	(2)
2021–2025	Spartak Varna	121	(11)
2025–2026	Fratria	26	(4)
2026–	Dobrudzha	13	(1)
- * Club domestic league appearances and goals as of 22 September 2026 (UTC)

Viktor Stefanov Mitev (Bulgarian: Виктор Стефанов Митев; born 15 February 1992) is a Bulgarian professional footballer who plays as a left winger or left-back for Second League club Dobrudzha Dobrich.

== Career ==
A product of the Cherno More youth academy, Mitev made his first team début in a 1–1 A PFG draw at Minyor Pernik on 21 May 2011, coming on as a substitute for Vladimir Kaptiev. On 17 June 2025, after spending 5 years with Spartak Varna, he moved to Fratria on a free transfer, together with his teammates Aleksandar Tsvetkov and Angel Granchov.
