= Adrián Cova =

Venezuelan footballer (born 2001)

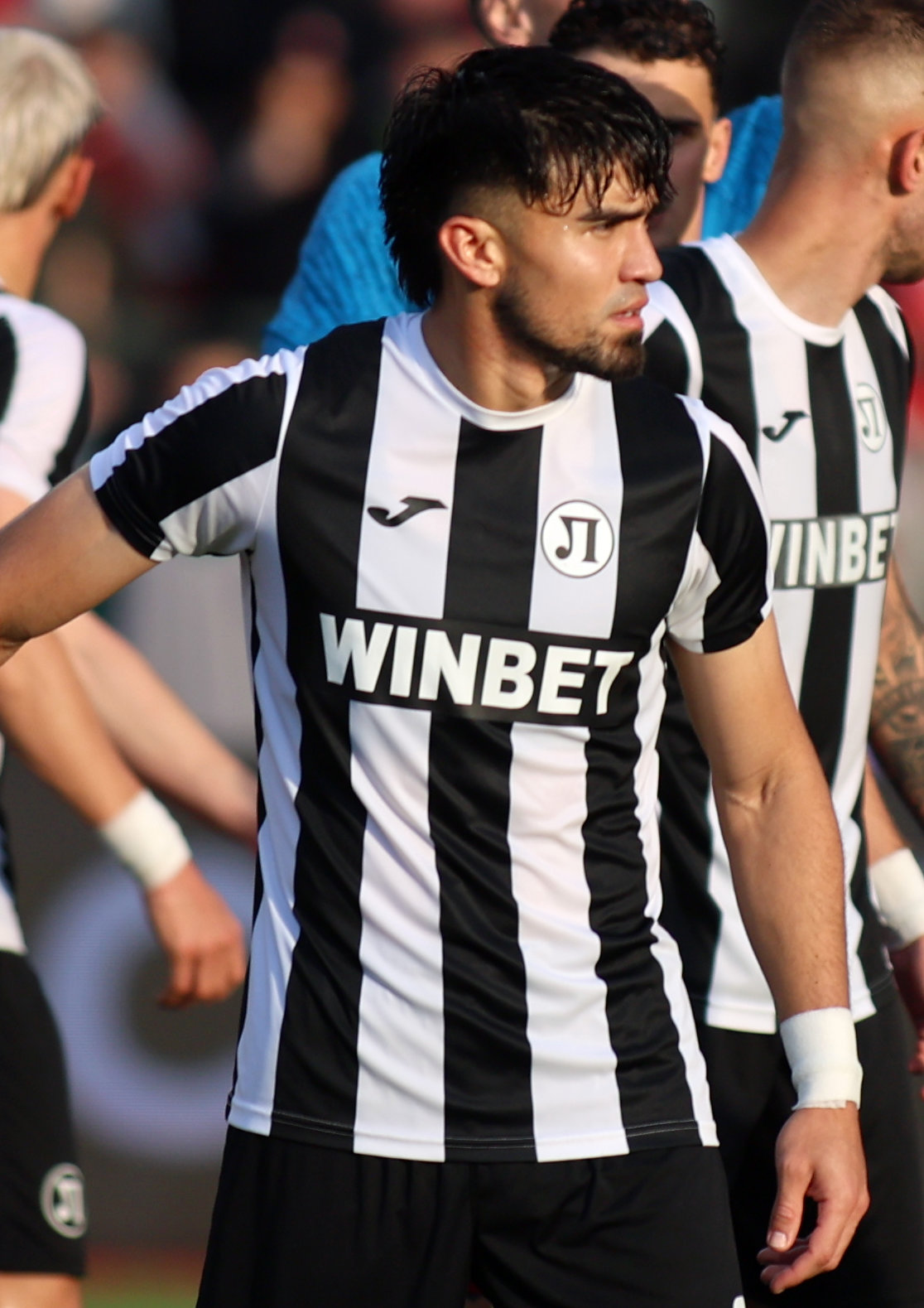

Personal information
- Full name: Adrián José Cova Urbina
- Date of birth: 13 February 2001 (age 25)
- Place of birth: Caracas, Venezuela
- Height: 1.80 m (5 ft 11 in)
- Position: Right-back

Team information
- Current team: Lokomotiv Plovdiv
- Number: 2

Youth career
- 2012–2015: Marcet Foundation
- 2015–2020: Atlético Madrid

Senior career*
Years	Team	Apps	(Gls)
2020–2021	El Ejido	2	(2)
2021–2023	Recreativo Granada	38	(0)
2023–2024	SD Logroñés	23	(0)
2025	Krumovgrad	15	(0)
2025–	Lokomotiv Plovdiv	41	(3)

International career^{‡}
2022	Venezuela U21	2	(0)
2025–	Venezuela	2	(0)
- * Club domestic league appearances and goals as of 20:09, 20 September 2026 (UTC) ‡ National team caps and goals as of 22:00, 16 June 2026 (UTC)

Adrián José Cova Urbina (born 13 February 2001) is a Venezuelan professional footballer who plays as a right-back for Bulgarian First League club Lokomotiv Plovdiv and the Venezuela national team.

== Club career ==
Cova is a product of the youth academies of the Spanish clubs Marcet Foundation and Atlético Madrid. On 23 September 2020, he transferred to El Ejido in the Segunda División B where he began his senior career. On 21 July 2021, he joined Recreativo Granada on a 2-year contract. On 1 September 2023, he moved to SD Logroñés in the Primera Federación. In 2024, he moved to the Bulgarian First Professional Football League side Krumovgrad. On 20 June 2025, he joined Lokomotiv Plovdiv.

== International career ==
Born in Venezuela, Cova moved to Spain at the age of 12. In November 2025, Cova was called up to the senior Venezuela national team for a set of friendlies.

== Career statistics ==
=== Club ===
As of match played 20 September 2026

Club	Season	League			Cup		Europe		Other		Total	
Club	Season	Division	Apps	Goals	Apps	Goals	Apps	Goals	Apps	Goals	Apps	Goals
El Ejido	2020–21	Segunda División B	24	1	1	0	—		—		25	1
Granada B	2021–22	Segunda Federación	15	0	—		—		—		15	0
Granada B	2022–23	Segunda Federación	19	0	—		—		4 (Note: Appearances in 2023 Segunda Federación play-offs)	0	23	0
Granada B	Total		34	0	—		—		4	0	38	0
SD Logroñés	2023–24	Primera Federación	23	0	—		—		—		23	0
Krumovgrad	2024–25	First League	15	0	—		—		—		15	0
Lokomotiv Plovdiv	2025–26	First League	31	3	6	0	—		—		37	3
Lokomotiv Plovdiv	2026–27	First League	10	0	0	0	—		—		10	0
Lokomotiv Plovdiv	Total		41	3	6	0	—		—		47	3
Career total			137	4	7	0	0	0	4	0	148	4

=== International ===
As of match played 9 June 2026

Appearances and goals by national team and year
National team	Year	Apps	Goals	
Venezuela	2025	1	0	
Venezuela	2026	1	0	
Venezuela	Total		2	0
