= Aleksandar Tsvetkov =

Bulgarian footballer (born 1990)

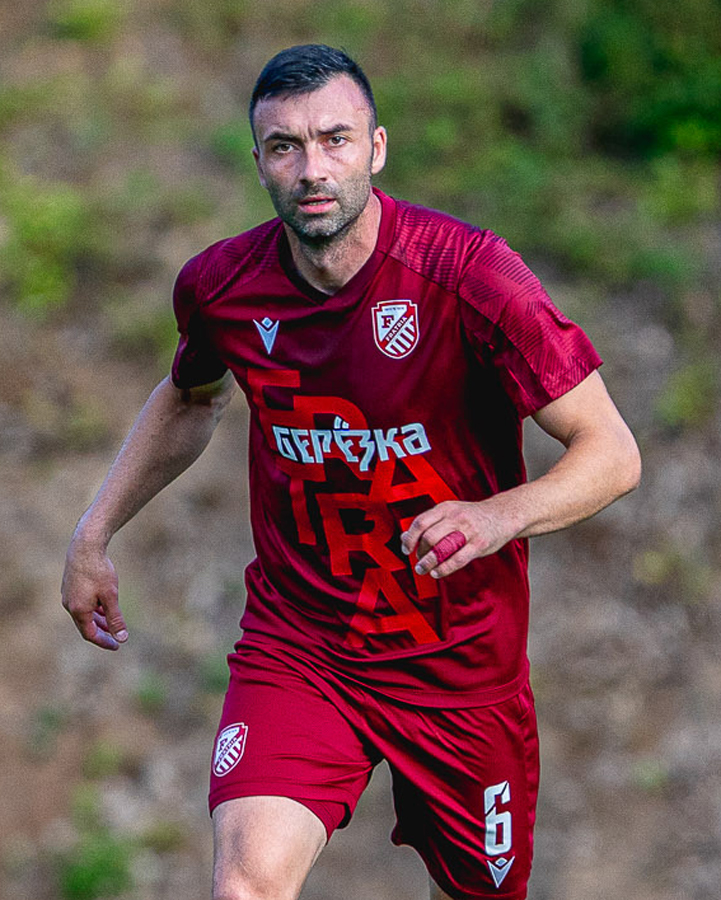
- Tsvetkov playing for Fratria in 2025.

Personal information
- Full name: Aleksandar Aleksandrov Tsvetkov
- Date of birth: 31 August 1990 (age 36)
- Place of birth: Pleven, Bulgaria
- Height: 1.81 m (5 ft 11 in)
- Position: Central midfielder

Team information
- Current team: Fratria
- Number: 6

Youth career
- 1996–2006: Spartak Pleven
- 2006–2008: Litex Lovech

Senior career*
Years	Team	Apps	(Gls)
2008–2016	Litex Lovech	101	(4)
2015–2016	Litex Lovech II	22	(1)
2016–2018	Cherno More	57	(2)
2018–2022	Beroe	111	(2)
2022	Academica Clinceni	15	(0)
2022	Politehnica Timișoara	14	(0)
2023–2025	Spartak Varna	84	(2)
2025–	Fratria	29	(1)

International career
2010–2012	Bulgaria U21	12	(0)
2011–2020	Bulgaria	11	(1)
- * Club domestic league appearances and goals as of 18:15, 24 September 2026 (UTC)

Aleksandar Aleksandrov Tsvetkov (Bulgarian: Александър Александров Цветков; born 31 August 1990) is a Bulgarian professional footballer who plays as a midfielder for Second League club Fratria.

== Career ==
=== Litex ===
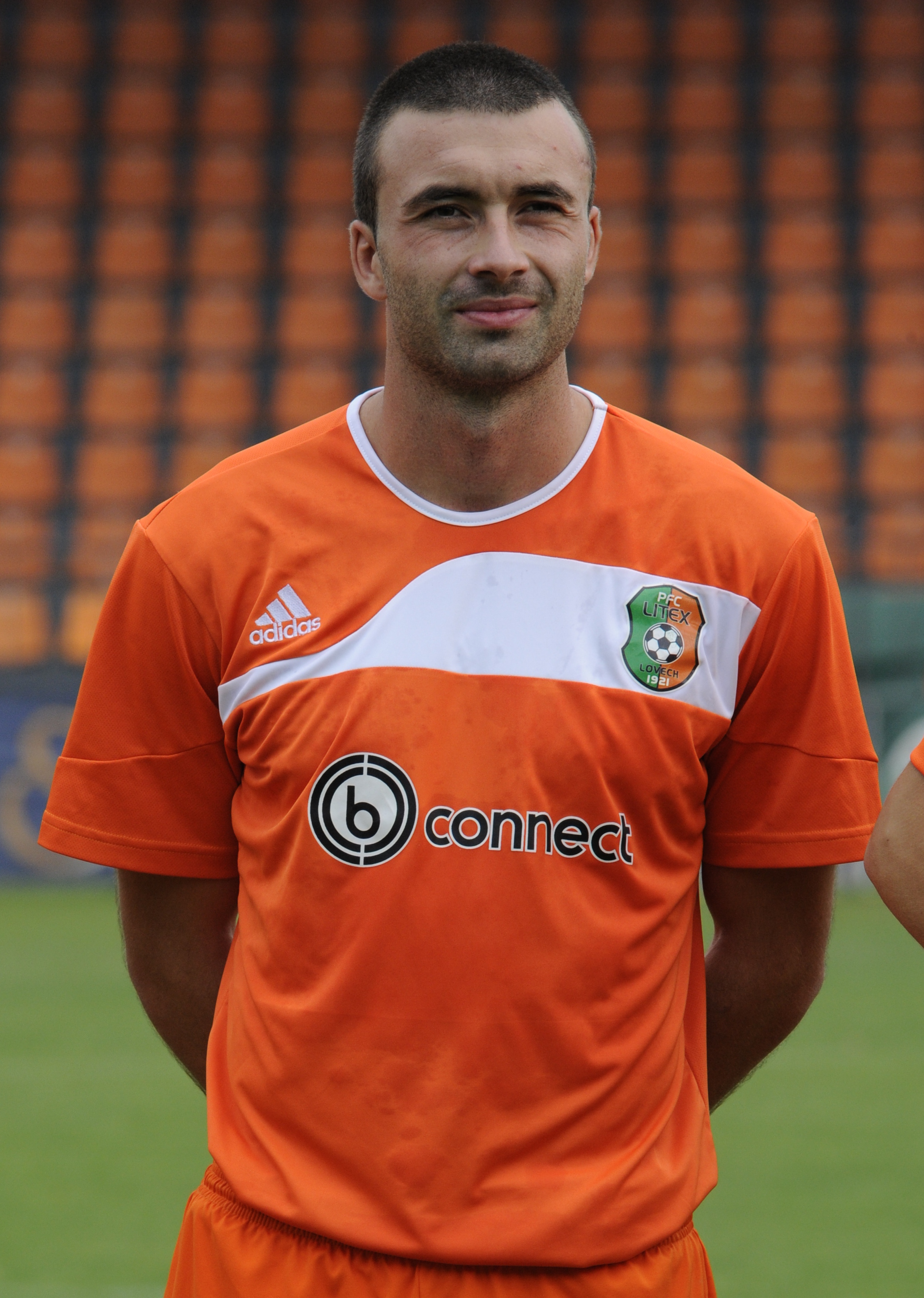
Tsvetkov in 2012.

Tsvetkov made his first team debut in a 5–1 Bulgarian Cup win over Maritsa Plovdiv on 7 December 2008, coming on as a substitute for Sandrinho. He made his league debut on 31 May 2009, again as a substitute replacing Wilfried Niflore, as Litex beat CSKA Sofia 1–0.

Tsvetkov became a first-team regular early in the 2012–13 season. On 31 August 2012, he scored his first goal in a 4–0 away league win over Botev Vratsa.

=== Cherno More ===
On 9 June 2016 after 10 years in Litex, he left the club and joined Cherno More. He quickly established himself as a regular starter, so it came as a surprise when his contract was terminated by mutual consent in May 2018, several weeks before the end of the season.

=== Beroe ===
On 23 June 2018, Tsvetkov signed with Beroe.

=== Spartak Varna ===
On 29 December 2022, he was announced as a new signing of Spartak Varna, joining the team on a one-and-a-half-year contract.

=== Fraria ===
On 17 June 2025 he moved to Fratria on a free transfer, together with his teammates Viktor Mitev and Angel Granchov.

== International career ==
On 7 October 2011, Tsvetkov earned his first cap for Bulgaria in the 0–3 away loss against Ukraine in an exhibition match. He had to wait nearly 6 years to feature for the national team again; on 3 September 2017, Tsvetkov was in the line-up for a 2018 FIFA World Cup qualifier, a 1–3 away defeat by the Netherlands.

== Career statistics ==
As of 6 May 2022

Club	Season	League		Cup		Europe		Total	
Club	Season	Apps	Goals	Apps	Goals	Apps	Goals	Apps	Goals
Litex Lovech	2008–09	2	0	1	0	0	0	3	0
Litex Lovech	2009–10	1	0	1	0	0	0	2	0
Litex Lovech	2010–11	14	0	1	0	2	0	17	0
Litex Lovech	2011–12	18	0	1	0	3	0	22	0
Litex Lovech	2012–13	24	3	4	0	–	–	28	3
Litex Lovech	2013–14	33	1	6	2	–	–	39	3
Litex Lovech	2014–15	7	0	2	0	3	0	12	0
Litex Lovech	2015–16	2	0	3	0	0	0	5	0
Litex Lovech	Total	101	4	19	2	8	0	126	6
Litex Lovech II	2015–16	22	1	–	–	–	–	22	1
Cherno More	2016–17	31	2	3	2	–	–	34	4
Cherno More	2017–18	26	0	1	0	–	–	27	0
Cherno More	Total	57	2	4	2	0	0	61	4
Beroe	2018–19	35	0	1	1	–	–	36	1
Beroe	2019–20	29	1	1	0	–	–	30	1
Beroe	2020–21	29	0	2	0	–	–	31	0
Beroe	2021–22	18	1	1	0	–	–	19	1
Beroe	Total	111	2	5	1	0	0	116	3
Academica Clinceni	2021–22	15	0	–	–	–	–	15	0
Career total		306	9	28	5	8	0	342	14

=== International stats ===
Bulgaria national team
Year	Apps	Goals
2011	1	0
2012	0	0
2013	0	0
2014	0	0
2015	0	0
2016	0	0
2017	1	0
2018	0	0
2019	2	0
2020	7	1
Total	11	1

=== International goals ===
Scores and results list Bulgaria's goal tally first.

No.	Date	Venue	Opponent	Score	Result	Competition
1.	11 November 2020	Vasil Levski National Stadium, Sofia, Bulgaria	Gibraltar	1–0	3–0	Friendly

== Honours ==
Litex Lovech

- Bulgarian A Group (2): 2009–10, 2010–11
- Bulgarian Cup: 2008–09
- Bulgarian Supercup: 2010
