= Angel Granchov =

Bulgarian footballer

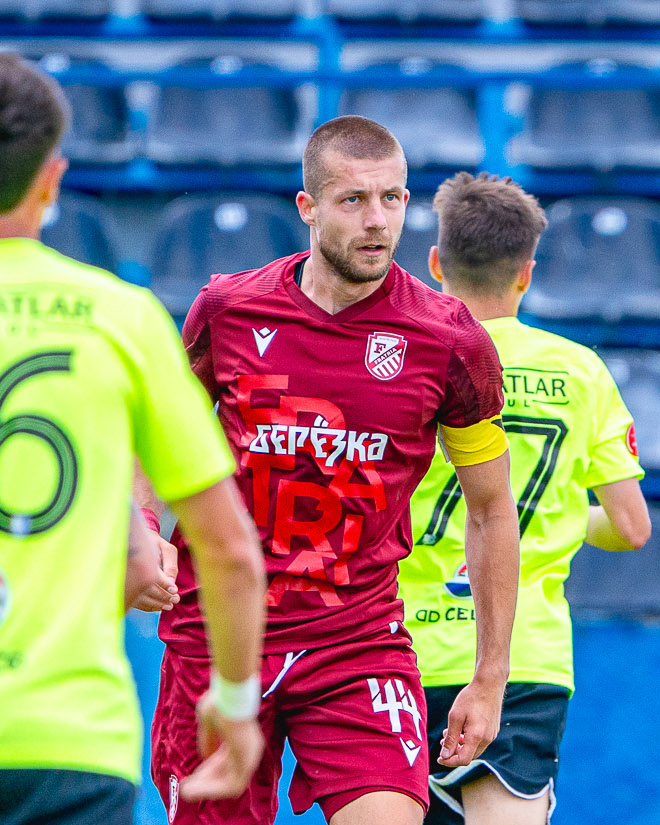
- Granchov playing for Fratria in 2025.

Personal information
- Full name: Angel Simeonov Granchov
- Date of birth: 16 October 1992 (age 34)
- Place of birth: Elin Pelin, Bulgaria
- Height: 1.88 m (6 ft 2 in)
- Position: Centre back

Youth career
- 2002–2011: CSKA Sofia

Senior career*
Years	Team	Apps	(Gls)
2011–2013	CSKA Sofia	29	(1)
2014	Lokomotiv Plovdiv	21	(0)
2015	Slavia Sofia	5	(0)
2015–2016	CSKA Sofia	20	(1)
2016–2017	Neftochimic Burgas	24	(0)
2017–2018	Stal Mielec	5	(0)
2018	Spartak Pleven	?	(?)
2018	Minyor Pernik	11	(1)
2019	Flamurtari	35	(3)
2020	Akademija Pandev	5	(0)
2020–2021	Septemvri Sofia	17	(0)
2021–2022	Maritsa Plovdiv	23	(1)
2022–2023	CSKA 1948 II	29	(1)
2022–2023	CSKA 1948	3	(0)
2023–2025	Spartak Varna	53	(1)
2025	Fratria	1	(1)
2025–2026	Spartak Varna	43	(1)

International career
2010	Bulgaria U19	1	(0)
2012–2014	Bulgaria U21	5	(0)
- * Club domestic league appearances and goals as of 21:43, 11 November 2026 (UTC)

Angel Simeonov Granchov (Bulgarian: Ангел Симеонов Грънчов; born 16 October 1992) is a Bulgarian professional footballer who plays as a defender.

== Club career ==
=== CSKA Sofia ===
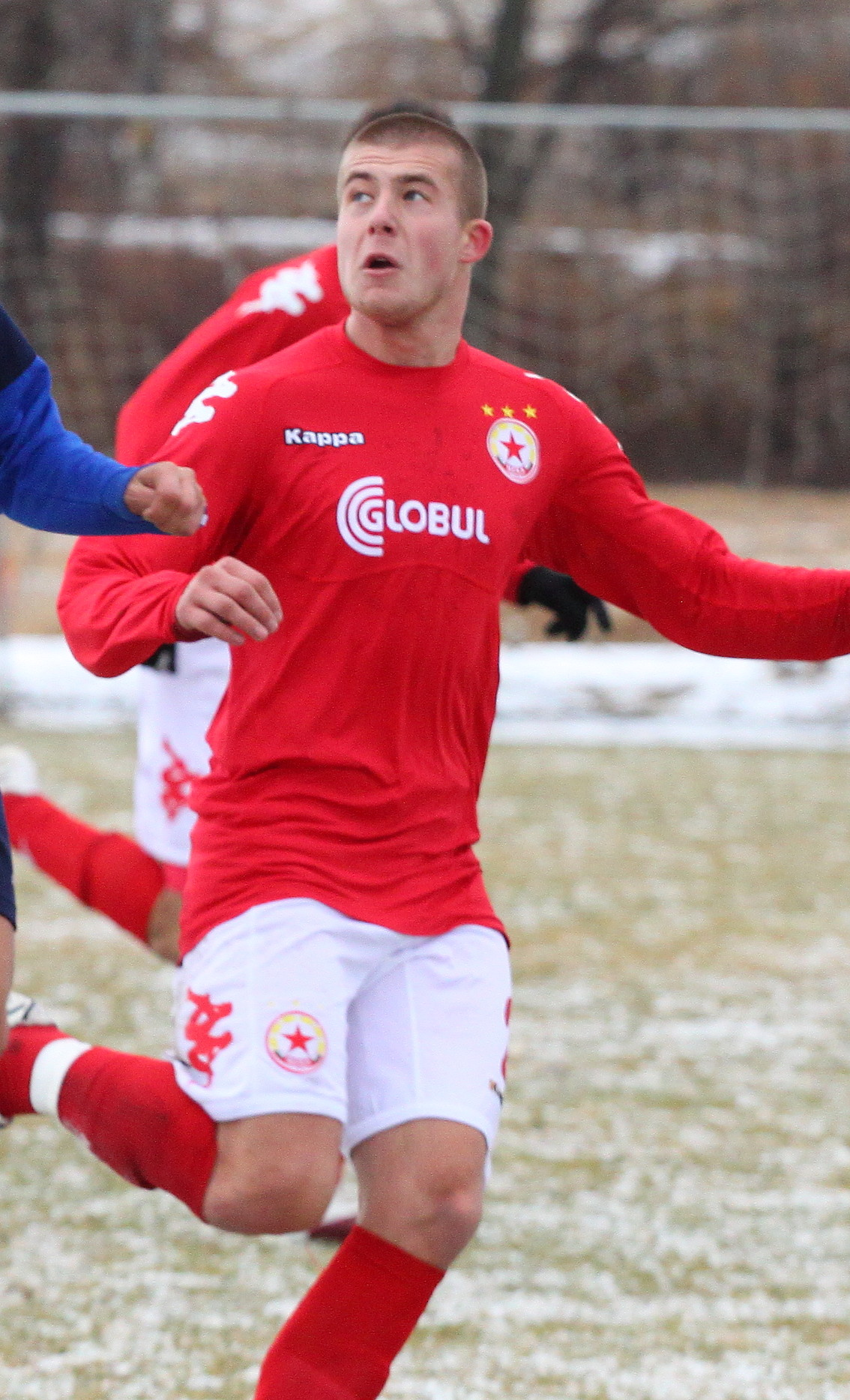
Granchov playing for CSKA in 2012

Born in Elin Pelin, Granchov joined the CSKA Sofia Academy in 2002 at the age of ten.

He made his first team debut on 4 March 2012 in a 2–0 A PFG loss against Chernomorets Burgas. His first goal came in his second appearance, a header from a corner in a 3–1 home win against Kaliakra Kavarna on 11 March. Granchov retained his starting spot until the end of the season, but received a red card on one occasion - in the 0–1 away loss against Ludogorets Razgrad in a title-deciding match held on 23 May 2012. In January 2014, Granchov was released from his contract.

=== Lokomotiv Plovdiv ===
On 17 February 2014, Granchov signed a two-and-a-half-year contract with Lokomotiv Plovdiv.

=== Slavia Sofia ===
In late January 2015, Granchov was acquired by Slavia Sofia.

=== CSKA Sofia ===
In July 2015, Granchov returned to CSKA Sofia.

=== Stal Mielec ===
On 17 July 2017, Granchov signed with I liga side Stal Mielec.

=== Fraria ===
On 17 June 2025, after 2 years in Spartak Varna, he moved to Fratria on a free transfer, together with his teammates Viktor Mitev and Aleksandar Tsvetkov.

== International career ==
In May 2012, Granchov received his first call-up to the Bulgaria U21 team for a 2013 UEFA European Under–21 Football Championship qualification match against Scotland U21. On 31 May 2012, Granchov made his debut after coming on as a second-half substitute in the 2–2 draw.

== Statistics ==
As of 10 August 2025

Club	Season	Division	League		Bulgarian Cup		Europe		Other		Total	
Club	Season	Division	Apps	Goals	Apps	Goals	Apps	Goals	Apps	Goals	Apps	Goals
CSKA Sofia	2011–12	A Group	15	1	1	0	0	0	–		16	1
CSKA Sofia	2012–13	A Group	11	0	3	0	1	0	–		15	0
CSKA Sofia	2013–14	A Group	3	0	1	0	–		–		4	0
CSKA Sofia	Total		29	1	5	0	1	0	0	0	35	1
Lokomotiv Plovdiv	2013–14	A Group	7	0	4	0	–		–		11	0
Lokomotiv Plovdiv	2014–15	A Group	14	0	2	0	–		–		16	0
Lokomotiv Plovdiv	Total		21	0	6	0	0	0	0	0	27	0
Slavia Sofia	2014–15	A Group	5	0	0	0	–		–		5	0
CSKA Sofia	2015–16	V Group	20	1	6	0	–		–		26	1
Neftochimic Burgas	2016–17	First League	26	0	1	0	–		–		27	0
Stal Mielec	2017–18	I liga	5	0	1	0	–		–		6	0
Spartak Pleven	2017–18	Third League	?	?	?	?	–		–		?	?
Spartak Pleven	2018–19	Third League	?	?	?	?	–		–		?	?
Spartak Pleven	Total		?	?	?	?	0	0	0	0	?	?
Minyor Pernik	2018–19	Second League	11	1	0	0	–		–		11	1
Flamurtari	2018–19	Kosovo Superleague	18	1	0	0	–		–		18	1
Flamurtari	2019–20	Kosovo Superleague	17	2	0	0	–		–		17	2
Flamurtari	Total		35	3	0	0	0	0	0	0	35	3
Akademija Pandev	2019–20	Macedonian First League	5	0	0	0	–		–		5	0
Septemvri Sofia	2020–21	Second League	17	0	1	0	–		0	0	18	0
Maritsa Plovdiv	2021–22	Second League	22	1	1	0	–		–		23	1
CSKA 1948 II	2022–23	Second League	29	1	–		–		–		29	1
CSKA 1948	2022–23	First League	4	0	0	0	–		–		4	0
Spartak Varna	2023–24	First League	25	1	2	0	–		–		27	1
Spartak Varna	2024–25	First League	28	0	1	0	–		–		29	0
Spartak Varna	Total		53	1	3	0	0	0	0	0	56	1
Fratria	2025–26	Second League	1	0	0	0	–		–		1	0
Spartak Varna (loan)	2025–26	First League	2	0	0	0	–		–		2	0
Career total			285	9	24	0	1	0	0	0	310	9

== Honours ==
CSKA Sofia

- Bulgarian Cup: 2015–16
