= Francisco Politino =

Footballer (born 1999)

Personal information
- Full name: Gianni Francisco Politino Touma
- Date of birth: 11 May 1999 (age 27)
- Place of birth: Carrodilla, Argentina
- Height: 1.73 m (5 ft 8 in)
- Position: Winger

Team information
- Current team: Homs Al Fidaa
- Number: 30

Youth career
- Academia Chacras de Coria

Senior career*
Years	Team	Apps	(Gls)
2020	Deportivo Maipú		
2021	Godoy Cruz		
2022	Independiente Rivadavia		
2022–2023	CE Mercadal	23	(2)
2023–2025	Beroe	48	(4)
2025–2026	Lokomotiv Plovdiv	28	(1)
2026–	Homs Al Fidaa	0	(0)

International career^{‡}
2026–	Palestine	2	(0)
- * Club domestic league appearances and goals as of 16 October 2026 ‡ National team caps and goals as of 10 June 2026

Gianni Francisco Politino Touma (born 11 May 1999) is a professional footballer who plays as a winger for Syrian Premier League club Homs Al Fidaa. Born in Argentina, he represents Palestine at international level.

== Career ==
On 21 June 2025, Politino joined Lokomotiv Plovdiv from fellow Bulgarian club Beroe.

== International career ==
Born in Argentina and having Italian and Palestine roots, Politino was available to play for Argentina, Italy and Palestine. On 17 March 2026, he received his first call-up for Palestine, for the friendly matches against Benin and Mauritania on 27 and 31 March.
