= Xavello Druiventak =

Spanish footballer

Personal information
- Full name: Xavello Djave Lyam Druiventak
- Date of birth: 3 May 2004 (age 22)
- Place of birth: Rotterdam, Netherlands
- Height: 1.71 m (5 ft 7 in)
- Positions: Forward; attacking midfielder

Team information
- Current team: Cesena
- Number: 14

Youth career
- 4CANTERA
- –2023: Alphense Boys

Senior career*
Years	Team	Apps	(Gls)
2023–2024	Be1	16	(4)
2024	→ Tauras (loan)	16	(5)
2024–2026	Fratria	50	(15)
2026–	Cesena	10	(0)
- * Club domestic league appearances and goals as of 07:51, 20 November 2026 (UTC)

Xavello Druiventak (born 3 May 2004) is a Dutch professional footballer who plays as a forward for Serie B club Cesena.

== Career ==
Xavello signed with Bulgarian team Fratria on 1 October 2024, coming from FK Be1. On 13 December 2024 his contract was extended until 30 June 2026. On 31 May 2026 it was announced that his contract ended and he would leave Fratria.

On 24 June 2026 he signed with Serie B team Cesena until 30 June 2028. On 18 August he made his debut for the team in an Italian Cup match against Sassuolo.
