= Stadion Spartak (Varna) =

Stadium in Varna, Bulgaria

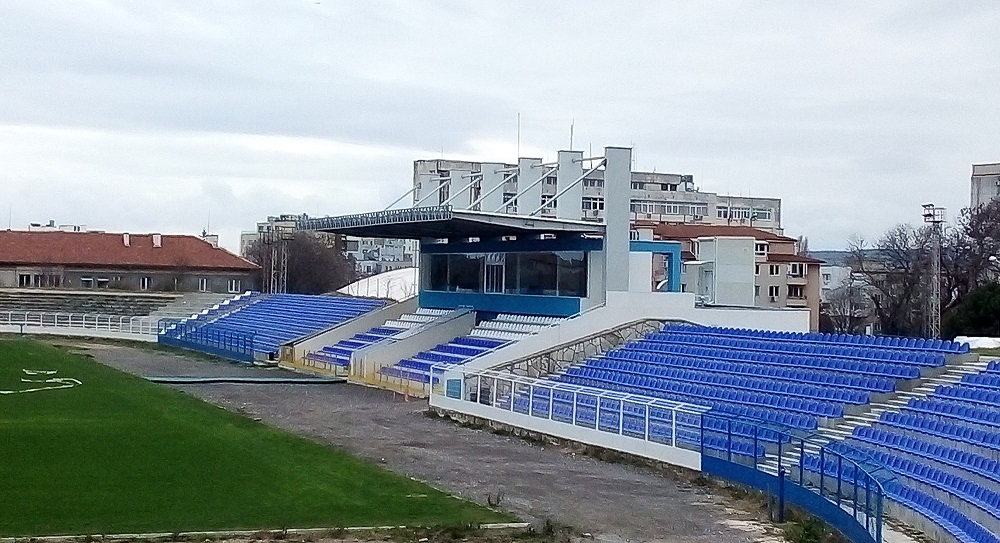
- Interactive map of Stadion Spartak
- Full name: Stadion Spartak
- Location: Varna, Bulgaria
- Coordinates: 43°13′7″N 27°54′45″E
- Operator: Varna Municipality
- Capacity: 7,000
- Surface: Grass
- Field size: 105 m × 69 m

Construction
- Groundbreaking: 1962
- Built: 1962
- Opened: 1964, 2020
- Renovated: 2019

Tenants
- Spartak Varna (1964–present); WFC Varna (2012–2021); Fratria (2025–present)

Stadion Spartak (Bulgarian: Стадион „Спартак“, English: 'Spartak Stadium') is a multi-purpose stadium in Varna, Bulgaria.

It is currently used mostly for football games and is the home ground of FC Spartak Varna and FC Fratria. The stadium was built in 1962 and opened in 1964, with capacity of 10,000 people. The stadium includes also fan bar-cafe and modern artificial fields. It is located not far from the city center.

On 2 September 2025, Spartak Varna announced they made a deal with Fratria play on Spartak Stadium and takes full responsibility for the maintenance and condition of the base.

== International matches ==
UEFA Intertoto Cup

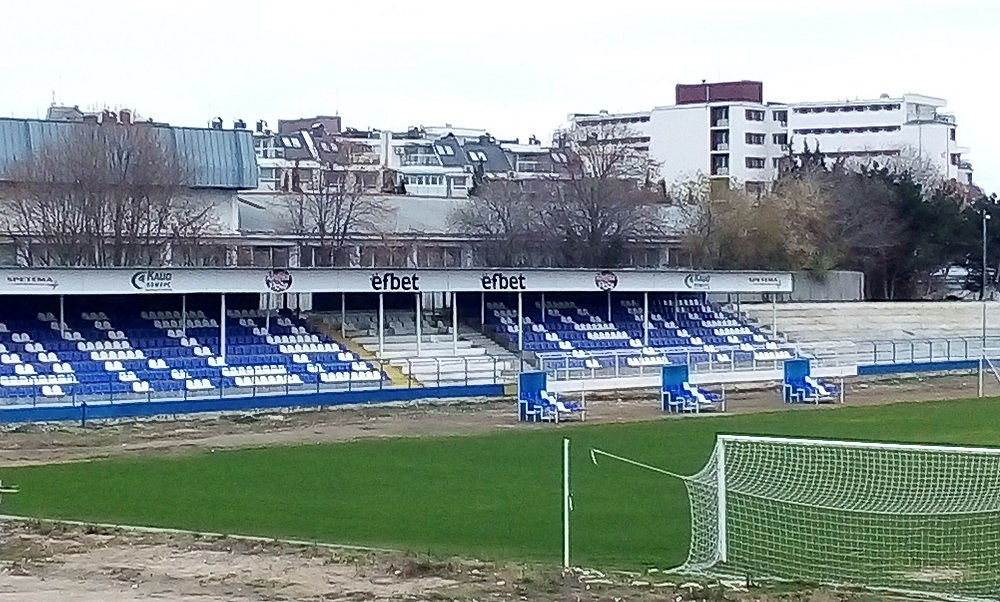
North Stand of the stadium

- June 22/23 1996 - PFC Spartak Varna 2-1 TSV 1860 München
- July 6/7 1996 - PFC Spartak Varna 0-1 Kaucuk Opava
- June 28/29 1997 - PFC Spartak Varna 0-2 F.C. Groningen
- July 12/13 1997 - PFC Spartak Varna 1-1 Montpellier HSC
- June 1998 - PFC Spartak Varna 1-1 Baltika Kaliningrad
- July 1999 - PFC Spartak Varna 1-2 K. Sint-Truidense V.V.
- 24 June 2001 - PFC Spartak Varna 4-0 Dyskobolia Grodzisk
- 1 July 2001 - PFC Spartak Varna 2-0 Tavriya Simferopol

== Gallery ==
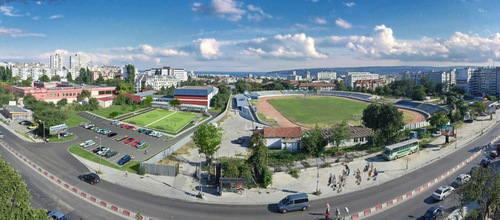
