= Efe Ali =

Bulgarian footballer (born 2003)

Personal information
- Full name: Efe Ali Ali
- Date of birth: 3 January 2003 (age 23)
- Place of birth: Haskovo, Bulgaria
- Height: 1.85 m (6 ft 1 in)
- Position: Midfielder

Team information
- Current team: Lokomotiv Plovdiv
- Number: 12

Youth career
- –2018: Haskovo
- 2018–2021: Levski Sofia
- 2021: Haskovo

Senior career*
| Years | Team | Apps | (Gls) |
| 2021–2022 | Beroe II | 3 | (1) |
| 2021–2022 | Beroe Stara Zagora | 0 | (0) |
| 2022–2023 | Sayana Haskovo | 24 | (4) |
| 2023– | Lokomotiv Plovdiv II | 17 | (2) |
| 2023– | Lokomotiv Plovdiv | 70 | (4) |

International career^{‡}
| 2023– | Bulgaria U21 | | |
| 2026– | Bulgaria | 1 | (0) |
- * Club domestic league appearances and goals as of 11 June 2026 ‡ National team caps and goals as of 21:06, 5 June 2026 (UTC)

Efe Ali Ali (Bulgarian: Ефе Али Али; born 3 January 2003) is a Bulgarian professional footballer who plays as a midfielder or centre back for Lokomotiv Plovdiv and the Bulgaria national team.

== Career ==
Born in Haskovo, he started his career in the local Haskovo, before moving to Levski Sofia academy. Ali joined Lokomotiv II in January 2023 coming from Sayana Haskovo. After his good plays for the team in Third League, in June 2023 he signed a professional contract with Lokomotiv Plovdiv.

== International career ==
In September 2023 Ali was called up for Bulgaria U21 for the 2025 UEFA European Under-21 Championship qualification matches against Germany U21 and Kosovo U21. In May 2026 he received his first call-up to the senior national team, for the friendly matches against Montenegro and Moldova. On 5 June 2026, Ali earned his first cap, coming on as a late second-half substitute in the 2:2 away draw with the latter national team.
