= Stefan Statev =

Bulgarian footballer (born 2003)

Personal information
- Full name: Stefan Yanev Statev
- Date of birth: 4 June 2003 (age 23)
- Place of birth: Varna, Bulgaria
- Height: 1.77 m (5 ft 10 in)
- Position: Midfielder

Team information
- Current team: Nesebar
- Number: 77

Youth career
- Spartak Varna
- –2019: Ludogorets Razgrad
- 2019–2021: Ascoli

Senior career*
Years	Team	Apps	(Gls)
2019	Ludogorets Razgrad II	1	(0)
2021–2022	CSKA 1948 II	12	(0)
2022–2024	Dobrudzha	37	(3)
2024	Eendracht Aalst	10	(1)
2024–2025	Arda Kardzhali	28	(0)
2025	Dunav Ruse	12	(1)
2026	Fratria	4	(0)
2026–	Nesebar	10	(4)

International career
2020	Bulgaria U17	1	(0)
- * Club domestic league appearances and goals as of 09:11, 7 October 2026 (UTC)

Stefan Statev (Bulgarian: Стефан Статев; born 4 June 2003) is a Bulgarian professional footballer who plays as a midfielder for Bulgarian club Nesebar.

== Career ==
Born in Varna, Statev started his youth career at the local Spartak Varna academy, before moving to Ludogorets Razgrad. In 2019 he left Ludogorets Academy to join Ascoli Academy. In January 2021 he returned from Italy and signed with CSKA 1948 and joined their second squad. In March 2021 he received an injury that ruled him out until October. On 30 June 2025 he signed with Dunav Ruse in order to find more playing time as a titular. On 17 January 2026 he signed a contract with Dunav's rivals for first place Fratria.
