= List of Bulgarian football transfers summer 2026 =

This is a list of Bulgarian football transfers for the 2026 summer transfer window. Only transfers involving a team from the two professional leagues, First League and Second League are listed.

== First League ==
=== Arda ===
In:

No.	Pos.	Nation	Player
2	DF	BRA	Derick (from (Portuguese Football Federation) Varzim)
5	DF	BUL	Viktor Lyubenov (from Levski Sofia II)
6	DF	BUL	Viktor Popov (from (Polish Football Association) Korona Kielce)
15	FW	BUL	Stanislav Ivanov (from Ludogorets Razgrad)
16	FW	BUL	Preslav Bachev (from Levski Sofia)
18	DF	BUL	Simeon Vasilev (from CSKA 1948)
22	GK	BUL	Yanko Georgiev (from Septemvri Sofia)
44	DF	CIV	Adama Traore (on loan from CSKA 1948)
64	MF	BUL	Dominik Yankov (from (Croatian Football Federation) Rijeka)

Out:

No.	Pos.	Nation	Player
2	DF	BRA	Gustavo Cascardo (to (Romanian Football Federation) Sepsi)
6	DF	BUL	Plamen Krachunov (end of contract)
11	FW	BRA	Andre Shinyashiki (end of contract)
12	GK	BUL	Ivaylo Nedelchev (to Rilski Sportist)
17	FW	BRA	Patrick Luan (to (Cyprus Football Association) Karmiotissa)
18	DF	AZE	Cəlal Hüseynov (to (Romanian Football Federation) Petrolul Ploiești)
23	DF	BUL	Emil Viyachki (to Marek)
30	FW	MLI	Wilson Samaké (loan return to (Turkish Football Federation) Bandırmaspor)
93	DF	CMR	Félix Eboa Eboa (to (Vietnam Football Federation) Thep Xanh Nam Dinh)

=== Botev Plovdiv ===
In:

No.	Pos.	Nation	Player
7	FW	ESP	Alberto Salido (on loan from Ludogorets)
9	FW	NGR	Chidera Okoh (from (Hellenic Football Federation) Asteras Tripolis)
10	MF	BUL	Asen Chandarov (from Cherno More)
11	MF	BUL	Stanislav Shopov (from (Croatian Football Federation) Osijek)
12	DF	BUL	Bogdan Kostov (from Dobrudzha)
17	MF	BUL	Georgi Milanov (from (Romanian Football Federation) Dinamo București)
19	FW	GBS	Mauro Rodrigues (from (Swiss Football Association) Yverdon-Sport)
20	DF	UGA	Timothy Awany (from (Israel Football Association) Ashdod)
22	DF	GER	Marvin Senger (from (Polish Football Association) Stal Mielec)
23	MF	BUL	Dimitar Tonev (from Cherno More)
44	MF	NGR	Ehije Ukaki (on loan from (The Football Association) Sheffield United)
82	DF	POR	Vladimir Mendes (from (Portuguese Football Federation) Benfica U23)

Out:

No.	Pos.	Nation	Player
2	DF	BRA	Gabriel Noga (to (Danish Football Association) Akademisk Boldklub)
7	MF	BUL	Nikola Iliev (on loan to Septemvri Sofia)
9	FW	NGR	Chidera Okoh (on loan to Spartak Varna)
9	FW	MNE	Aleksa Maraš (to (Slovak Football Association) Košice)
11	FW	BRA	Pedro Igor (on loan to Septemvri Sofia)
17	MF	BUL	Nikolay Minkov (released)
19	DF	GUI	Antoine Conte (end of contract)
22	DF	FRA	Enock Kwateng (released)
23	FW	DEN	Ifenna Dorgu (to (Royal Spanish Football Federation) Torremolinos)
38	DF	GRE	Konstantinos Balogiannis (to (Cyprus Football Association) Apollon Limassol)
41	DF	CIV	Zakaria Tindano (loan return to (Turkish Football Federation) Göztepe)
45	MF	GBS	Edson Silva (on loan to Spartak Varna)
—	FW	BRA	Tailson (to (Football Association of Thailand) PT Prachuap, previously on loan to Spartak Varna)
—	FW	BRA	Tales da Silva (released, previously on loan to Spartak Varna)

=== Botev Vratsa ===
In:

No.	Pos.	Nation	Player
6	MF	BUL	Abdula Kichukov (on loan from CSKA Sofia II)
17	MF	BUL	Samuil Mechev (from Hebar)
21	DF	BUL	Martin Dimitrov (from (Italian Football Federation) Sampdoria U20)
90	FW	BUL	Filip Gigov (from Ludogorets II)
99	FW	BUL	Preslav Borukov (from (Portuguese Football Federation) Marítimo)

Out:

No.	Pos.	Nation	Player
6	DF	BEN	Tamimou Ouorou (on loan to CSKA Sofia)
19	FW	BUL	Yoan Bornosuzov (loan return to CSKA Sofia)
20	FW	BEL	Mitchy Ntelo (loan return to (Swiss Football Association) Yverdon-Sport)
22	DF	BUL	Martin Stoychev (loan return to CSKA Sofia II)
—	DF	BUL	Rosen Marinov (to Spartak Pleven, previously on loan)
—	MF	BUL	Bozhidar Penchev (to Septemvri Sofia, previously on loan to Yantra)
—	MF	BUL	Spas Georgiev (to Lokomotiv Gorna Oryahovitsa, previously on loan to Sportist Svoge)

=== Cherno More ===
In:

No.	Pos.	Nation	Player
5	DF	ARG	Luciano Squadrone (from (Albanian Football Federation) Flamurtari)
7	FW	POR	Miguel Barandas (from (Portuguese Football Federation) Atlético CP)
11	MF	FRA	Mohamed Achi (from (French Football Federation) Rodez)
14	DF	BUL	Aleksandar Todorov (from Montana)
18	MF	BUL	Petar Andreev (from Montana)
20	FW	BUL	Aleksandar Kolev (from (Chinese Football Association) Nantong Zhiyun)
37	DF	BUL	Ventsislav Kerchev (from Dobrudzha)
67	GK	BUL	Damyan Hristov (from Ludogorets II)

Out:

No.	Pos.	Nation	Player
2	DF	BUL	Tsvetomir Panov (end of contract)
4	DF	BUL	Rosen Stefanov (to Fratria)
10	MF	BUL	Asen Chandarov (to Botev Plovdiv)
15	DF	ESP	Dani Martín (released)
16	MF	ROU	Andreias Calcan (released)
23	MF	BUL	Dimitar Tonev (to Botev Plovdiv)
28	DF	MKD	Vlatko Drobarov (to (Malta Football Association) Sliema Wanderers)

=== CSKA Sofia ===
In:

No.	Pos.	Nation	Player
3	DF	BEN	Tamimou Ouorou (on loan from Botev Vratsa)
4	DF	POR	Dinis Almeida (free agent)
5	DF	CIV	Jean-Philippe Gbamin (from (French Football Federation) Metz)
8	MF	ITA	Stefano Sensi (from (Cyprus Football Association) Anorthosis Famagusta)
10	FW	NED	Joël Zwarts (from Lokomotiv Plovdiv)
37	DF	IRL	Barry Cotter (from (Irish Football Association) Derry City)
67	MF	ROU	Cătălin Itu (from Lokomotiv Plovdiv)
80	MF	BUL	Georgi Chorbadzhiyski (loan return from Lokomotiv Plovdiv)

Out:

No.	Pos.	Nation	Player
4	DF	ESP	Adrián Lapeña (to (Royal Spanish Football Federation) Ceuta)
5	DF	KOS	Lumbardh Dellova (to (Turkish Football Federation) Amedspor)
7	MF	NOR	Olaus Skarsem (to (Norwegian Football Federation) Sarpsborg)
19	DF	BUL	Ivan Turitsov (to (Georgian Football Federation) Dinamo Batumi)
22	FW	ALB	Kevin Dodaj (on loan to (Polish Football Association) Lechia Gdańsk, previously on loan to (Albanian Football Federation) Vllaznia)
73	MF	BUL	Ilian Iliev Jr. (to (Turkish Football Federation) İstanbulspor)
77	FW	COL	Alejandro Piedrahita (on loan to (Canadian Soccer Association) Toronto FC)
—	FW	BUL	Yoan Bornosuzov (to Slavia Sofia, previously on loan to Botev Vratsa)
—	FW	GLP	Matthias Phaëton (to (Football Association of Singapore) Lion City Sailors, previously on loan to (Swiss Football Association) Zürich)

=== CSKA 1948 ===
In:

No.	Pos.	Nation	Player
8	MF	TUN	Moataz Zemzemi (from (Tunisian Football Federation) Club Africain)
18	FW	BUL	Boris Dimitrov (loan return from Montana)
30	MF	FRA	Jules Meyer (from (French Football Federation) Dijon)
33	MF	BOL	Héctor Cuéllar (from (Bolivian Football Federation) Always Ready)
70	DF	BUL	Kostadin Iliev (from Montana)

Out:

No.	Pos.	Nation	Player
3	DF	ESP	Juan Carrion (to (Slovak Football Association) Spartak Trnava)
8	MF	FRA	Yohann Magnin (to (French Football Federation) Grenoble)
87	FW	CIV	Jean David (loan return to (Ivorian Football Federation) FC Mouna)
88	DF	CIV	Adama Traore (on loan to Arda)
—	DF	BUL	Simeon Vasilev (to Arda, previously on loan to Septemvri Sofia)
—	DF	FRA	Sadio Dembélé (to (Cyprus Football Association) Karmiotissa, previously on loan to Lokomotiv Sofia)
—	DF	UKR	Yegor Romanyuk (on loan to Lokomotiv Gorna Oryahovitsa, previously on loan to Minyor Pernik)
—	DF	GHA	Christopher Acheampong (on loan to Lokomotiv Gorna Oryahovitsa, previously on loan to Montana)
—	MF	BRA	Luann Augusto (released, previously on loan to Lokomotiv Sofia)

=== Dunav Ruse ===
In:

No.	Pos.	Nation	Player
4	DF	COL	José Cabarcas (from (Football Federation of Macedonia) Makedonija GP)
5	DF	CYP	Kyriakos Antoniou (from (Cyprus Football Association) Akritas Chlorakas)
6	DF	BUL	Stanislav Yovkov (from Beroe)
9	FW	ESP	Alex Valiño (from (Royal Spanish Football Federation) Barakaldo)
13	MF	SRB	Vladan Vidaković (from (Football Association of Serbia) Kabel)
23	FW	USA	Jordan Saint-Louis (from (Portuguese Football Federation) Amarante)
24	MF	BUL	Stefan Gavrilov (from Beroe)
36	MF	GHA	Charles Appiah (from (Cyprus Football Association) APOEL Nicosia)
39	DF	POR	André Alves (from (Football Association of the Czech Republic) Dynamo České Budějovice)
51	DF	BUL	Ilker Budinov (from Spartak Varna)
69	GK	BUL	Plamen Pepelyashev (from Dobrudzha)

Out:

No.	Pos.	Nation	Player
1	GK	BUL	Mario Mladenov (to Fratria)
9	FW	BUL	Preslav Bachev (loan return to Levski Sofia)
17	FW	BUL	Borislav Marinov (loan return to Septemvri Sofia)
26	DF	BUL	Kamen Hadzhiev (to Vihren)
84	MF	GBS	Ivaldo Rufé (end of contract)

=== Levski Sofia ===
In:

No.	Pos.	Nation	Player
2	DF	BRA	Hevertton (from (The Football Association) Queens Park Rangers)
7	FW	BRA	Reinaldo (from (Portuguese Football Federation) Santa Clara)
8	MF	SRB	Marko Grujić (from (Hellenic Football Federation) AEK Athens)
19	MF	MAR	El Mehdi El Moubarik (from (United Arab Emirates Football Association) Al Ain)
20	DF	ESP	Álex Centelles (from (Royal Spanish Football Federation) Almería)
27	FW	ANG	David Kusso (from (Portuguese Football Federation) Chaves)
35	MF	POR	Serginho (from (Portuguese Football Federation) Santa Clara)
55	DF	BUL	Petko Hristov (on loan from (Italian Football Federation) Spezia)
77	FW	BUL	Adrian Raychev (on loan from (Italian Football Federation) Pisa)

Out:

No.	Pos.	Nation	Player
6	DF	CRO	Stipe Vulikić (on loan to Septemvri Sofia)
8	MF	GHA	Carlos Ohene (end of contract)
37	MF	BRA	Rildo (loan return to (Portuguese Football Federation) Santa Clara)
45	FW	CRO	Marko Dugandžić (end of contract)
70	MF	BUL	Georgi Kostadinov (retired)
95	FW	MTQ	Karl Fabien (to (Football Association of Serbia) IMT)
—	FW	BUL	Preslav Bachev (to Arda, previously on loan to Dunav Ruse)

=== Lokomotiv Plovdiv ===
In:

No.	Pos.	Nation	Player
3	DF	FRA	Dalil Ali (from (Luxembourg Football Federation) Union Titus Pétange)
11	MF	NED	Ryan Leijten (from (Royal Dutch Football Association) Roda)
44	DF	GER	Milan Petrovic (from (German Football Association) Stuttgarter Kickers)
94	DF	BRA	Matheus Brito (from (Portuguese Football Federation) Paredes)

Out:

No.	Pos.	Nation	Player
6	DF	BUL	Kaloyan Kostov (to Lokomotiv Sofia)
10	MF	PLE	Francisco Politino (released)
14	FW	BUL	Dimitar Iliev (retired)
16	MF	BUL	Valeri Bozhinov (to Rilski Sportist)
19	FW	BUL	Mariyan Vangelov (on loan to Hebar)
29	MF	BUL	Georgi Chorbadzhiyski (loan return to CSKA Sofia)
77	FW	NED	Joël Zwarts (to CSKA Sofia)
94	MF	ROU	Cătălin Itu (to CSKA Sofia)
—	MF	BUL	Ivaylo Markov (to Etar, previously on loan)

=== Lokomotiv Sofia ===
In:

No.	Pos.	Nation	Player
3	DF	BUL	Kaloyan Kostov (from Lokomotiv Plovdiv)
16	MF	TUN	Mohamed Medfai (from (Royal Belgian Football Association) Olympic Charleroi)
17	FW	BUL	Mark-Emilio Papazov (from CSKA Sofia II)
20	FW	BUL	Dimitar Kostadinov (from Chernomorets Burgas)
23	DF	NGR	David Ogaga (from (Polish Football Association) Górnik Łęczna)
71	FW	BUL	Nicholas Penev (from CSKA Sofia III)

Out:

No.	Pos.	Nation	Player
2	DF	BUL	Dzhuneyt Ali (end of contract)
3	DF	CGO	Messie Biatoumoussoka (to (Malta Football Association) Hamrun Spartans)
4	DF	FRA	Sadio Dembélé (loan return to CSKA 1948)
6	MF	BUL	Simeon Slavchev (to Minyor Pernik)
8	MF	BRA	Luann Augusto (loan return to CSKA 1948)
13	MF	BRA	Diego Raposo (end of contract)
27	DF	CRO	Ivan Lagundžić (released)
28	MF	GRE	Donaldo Açka (end of contract)
33	FW	ENG	Jordon Ibe (released)
64	MF	BUL	Dominik Yankov (loan return to (Croatian Football Federation) Rijeka)
68	GK	BUL	Umut Habil (end of contract)

=== Ludogorets Razgrad ===
In:

No.	Pos.	Nation	Player
4	DF	EGY	Hossam Abdelmaguid (from (Egyptian Football Association) Zamalek)
6	MF	UKR	Ivan Zhelizko (from (Polish Football Association) Lechia Gdańsk)
8	MF	BIH	Amir Hadžiahmetović (free agent)
10	FW	BRA	Nathan Fernandes (on loan from (Brazilian Football Confederation) Botafogo)
13	GK	CRO	Ivo Grbić (from (The Football Association) Sheffield United)
22	DF	BUL	Mihail Polendakov (on loan from (The Football Association) Sheffield United)
44	DF	TUN	Omar Rekik (from (Football Association of Slovenia) Maribor)

Out:

No.	Pos.	Nation	Player
1	GK	NED	Sergio Padt (mutual agreement)
4	DF	POR	Dinis Almeida (end of contract, to CSKA Sofia)
7	FW	ESP	Alberto Salido (on loan to Botev Plovdiv)
10	FW	BRA	Matheus Machado (loan return to (Saudi Arabian Football Federation) Al Fateh)
24	DF	BEN	Olivier Verdon (mutual agreement)
25	FW	COL	Emerson Rodríguez (on loan to (Colombian Football Federation) Independiente Santa Fe)
29	FW	CIV	Yves Erick Bile (on loan to (Israel Football Association) Hapoel Petah Tikva)
30	MF	BRA	Pedro Naressi (end of contract, to (Swiss Football Association) Servette)
55	DF	ISR	Idan Nachmias (to (Israel Football Association) Hapoel Be'er Sheva)
82	MF	BUL	Ivan Yordanov (on loan to Lokomotiv Sofia)
99	FW	BUL	Stanislav Ivanov (to Arda)

=== Septemvri Sofia ===
In:

No.	Pos.	Nation	Player
6	MF	POR	Pedro Ferreira (from (Portuguese Football Federation) Paredes)
8	MF	BUL	Bozhidar Penchev (from Botev Vratsa)
10	MF	BUL	Nikola Iliev (on loan from Botev Plovdiv)
11	FW	BRA	Pedro Igor (on loan from Botev Plovdiv)
12	GK	BUL	Vladimir Ivanov (loan return from Belasitsa)
15	DF	MDA	Petar Gospodinov (from Spartak Pleven)
24	DF	BUL	Zahari Atanasov (loan return from Lokomotiv Gorna Oryahovitsa)
25	DF	CRO	Stipe Vulikić (on loan from Levski Sofia)
27	FW	POR	André Liberal (from (Portuguese Football Federation) Paços de Ferreira)

Out:

No.	Pos.	Nation	Player
8	MF	BUL	Krasian Kolev (to Chernomorets Burgas)
9	FW	FRA	Bertrand Fourrier (to (Russian Football Union) Ural Yekaterinburg)
10	FW	SRB	Stefan Stojanović (loan return to (Football Association of Serbia) Spartak Subotica)
14	DF	BUL	Simeon Vasilev (loan return to CSKA 1948)
18	MF	MAR	Ayoub Abou (released)
19	DF	SLO	Dominik Ivkič (to (Football Association of Slovenia) Brinje Grosuplje)
21	GK	BUL	Yanko Georgiev (to Arda)
23	DF	NED	Robin Schouten (released)
25	MF	KOS	Valon Hamdiu (to (Swiss Football Association) Rapperswil-Jona)
27	DF	BUL	Georgi Varbanov (end of contract)
30	DF	BUL	Mateo Stamatov (to (Georgian Football Federation) Torpedo Kutaisi)
—	FW	BUL	Borislav Marinov (to Vihren, previously on loan to Dunav Ruse)

=== Slavia Sofia ===
In:

No.	Pos.	Nation	Player
3	DF	BUL	Martin Georgiev (from Spartak Varna)
9	FW	BUL	Yoan Bornosuzov (from CSKA Sofia)
23	MF	BUL	Ilian Antonov (from CSKA Sofia II)
26	DF	BUL	Dimitar Burov (from Montana)
27	FW	GBS	Umaro Baldé (from Montana)
88	FW	BUL	Vladimir Nikolov (from (Polish Football Association) Korona Kielce)

Out:

No.	Pos.	Nation	Player
6	DF	BUL	Luka Ivanov (released)
14	FW	SRB	Marko Miletić (on loan to Marek)
18	FW	BUL	Kristiyan Balov (to (Football Association of Serbia) Red Star Belgrade)
21	MF	BLR	Vladimir Medved (to Dobrudzha)
55	FW	BUL	Lyubomir Kostov (to CSKA Sofia II)

=== Spartak Varna ===
In:

No.	Pos.	Nation	Player
6	DF	POR	Ricardo Sousa (from (Portuguese Football Federation) Vianense)
7	MF	BRA	José Neto (from Dobrudzha)
11	MF	POR	Boubacar Hanne (from Dobrudzha)
16	MF	GBS	Edson Silva (on loan from Botev Plovdiv)
19	MF	HUN	Sámuel Major (on loan from (Hungarian Football Federation) MTK)
21	DF	COL	Jhonatan Cuero (on loan from Dobrudzha)
23	GK	BUL	Plamen Iliev (free agent)
29	DF	CIV	Zakaria Tindano (on loan from (Turkish Football Federation) Göztepe)
39	FW	BUL	Georgi Trifonov (from Dobrudzha)
45	DF	NED	Joey Tshitoku (from (Royal Belgian Football Association) Tubize-Braine)
70	FW	BUL	Ahmed Ahmedov (from (Japan) Shimizu S-Pulse)
72	DF	POR	Vasco Oliveira (from Dobrudzha)
76	DF	ESP	David Valverde (from Beroe)
77	MF	BUL	Anton Ivanov (from Dobrudzha)
80	FW	VEN	Ángel Gomes (from (Portuguese Football Federation) Varzim)
82	MF	POR	Tomás Silva (from Dobrudzha)
90	FW	NGR	Chidera Okoh (on loan from Botev Plovdiv)
—	FW	BUL	Kristiyan Yovov (from Levski Sofia II)

Out:

No.	Pos.	Nation	Player
7	FW	BUL	Petar Prindzhev (on loan to Dobrudzha)
8	MF	BUL	Daniel Ivanov (to (Football Federation of Kosovo) Llapi)
11	DF	BUL	Aleksandar Georgiev (to Yantra)
13	FW	BRA	Tales da Silva (loan return to Botev Plovdiv)
16	DF	BUL	Ilker Budinov (to Dunav Ruse)
18	MF	AUS	Saad Moukachar (to (Football Australia) Avondale)
19	MF	BUL	Emil Yanchev (to Chernomorets Burgas)
21	FW	BRA	Xande (to (Football Association of Slovenia) Olimpija Ljubljana)
23	GK	UKR	Maksym Kovalyov (released)
29	FW	BRA	Tailson (loan return to Botev Plovdiv)
39	DF	BUL	Kristiyan Kurbanov (to Pirin Blagoevgrad)
50	DF	BUL	Martin Georgiev (to Slavia Sofia)
77	MF	BUL	Aleksandar Aleksandrov (released)
90	FW	MKD	Georg Stojanovski (to (Qatar Football Association) Lusail)
—	FW	BUL	Kristiyan Yovov (on loan to Dobrudzha)
—	FW	BUL	Daniel Halachev (on loan to Dobrudzha, previously on loan to Fratria)

== Second League ==
=== Beroe ===
In:

No.	Pos.	Nation	Player
1	GK	BUL	Ivan Goshev (from Minyor Pernik)
2	DF	BUL	Lachezar Mihaylov (from Maritsa Plovdiv)
4	DF	BUL	Denis Dinev (from CSKA Sofia II)
7	MF	BUL	Simeon Veshev (from Marek)
9	FW	SEN	Cheikh Diamanka (from (Malta Football Association) Mosta)
13	GK	BUL	Kristiyan Filipov (from Zagorets)
17	DF	BUL	Georgi Valchev (from Hebar)
19	MF	BUL	Daniel Yanev (from (United States Soccer Federation) Chicago Sockers)
20	FW	BUL	Zapro Dinev (on loan from Lokomotiv Plovdiv)
21	MF	BUL	Nikola Bandev (from Pirin Blagoevgrad)
22	FW	ARG	Giuliano Bertino (from (Royal Spanish Football Federation) Porreres)
23	FW	ESP	Hamza El Yahyaoui (from (Royal Spanish Football Federation) Moralo)
24	DF	BUL	Hristo Mitev (from Chernomorets Burgas)
30	FW	BUL	Ivo Kazakov (from Pirin Blagoevgrad)
—	DF	BUL	Borislav Vakadinov (from Marek)
—	MF	BUL	Aykut Ramadan (from Dobrudzha)

Out:

No.	Pos.	Nation	Player
1	GK	BRA	Arthur Motta (on loan to (Association of Football Federations of Azerbaijan) Qabala)
3	DF	ARG	Juan Pablo Salomoni (to (Football Federation of Chile) Unión La Calera)
4	DF	BRA	Facundo Costantini (loan return to (Cyprus Football Association) AEL Limassol)
5	MF	BRA	Caio Lopes (to (Italian Football Federation) Gravina)
7	FW	DOM	Juanca Pineda (on loan to (Moldovan Football Federation) Sheriff Tiraspol)
8	MF	ARG	Marco Borgnino (to (Italian Football Federation) Giugliano)
9	FW	COL	Yesid Valbuena (loan return to (Portuguese Football Federation) União Nogueirense)
10	FW	ESP	Daniel Bodega (to (Ukrainian Association of Football) Epitsentr)
12	DF	ESP	David Valverde (to Spartak Varna)
13	GK	ESP	Jaume Valens (to (Hellenic Football Federation) Anagennisi Karditsa)
14	DF	BUL	Viktorio Valkov (to Fratria)
15	FW	ARG	Facundo Alarcón (released)
16	DF	BUL	Stanislav Yovkov (to Dunav Ruse)
19	FW	GER	Emir Kuhinja (to (German Football Association) FC 08 Homburg)
20	DF	BUL	Borislav Vakadinov (to Dobrudzha)
21	MF	BUL	Aykut Ramadan (to Vihren Sandanski)
23	DF	GAM	Tijan Sonha (to (Football Association of Serbia) Radnik Surdulica)
24	MF	BUL	Stefan Gavrilov (to Dunav Ruse)
25	DF	POR	João Milheirão (to (Portuguese Football Federation) Oliveirense)
27	DF	GBS	Augusto Dabó (to (Football Federation of Armenia) Gandzasar Kapan)
30	DF	URU	Santiago Brunelli (released)
32	MF	POR	Francisco Varela (to (Portuguese Football Federation) Penafiel)
99	GK	ARG	Valentino Quintero (released)

=== Chernomorets Burgas ===
In:

No.	Pos.	Nation	Player
4	MF	BUL	Ivaylo Klimentov (from Vihren)
6	FW	BUL	Andrian Dimitrov (from Sevlievo)
8	MF	BUL	Emil Yanchev (from Spartak Varna)
10	MF	BUL	Krasian Kolev (from Septemvri Sofia)
14	DF	BUL	Dimitar Dimitrov (from Rozova Dolina)
23	MF	UKR	Ivan Brikner (from Fratria)
98	FW	BUL	Valentin Yoskov (from Fratria)

Out:

No.	Pos.	Nation	Player
1	GK	BUL	Dimitar Todorov (released)
2	DF	BUL	Mariyan Dimitrov (to Sozopol)
4	DF	BUL	Dimitar Avramov (to Montana)
5	DF	BUL	Petar Genchev (released)
7	MF	BUL	Hidaet Hyusein (released)
10	FW	BUL	Dimitar Kostadinov (to Lokomotiv Sofia)
12	GK	BUL	Martin Kaishev (to CSKA Sofia II)
15	MF	BUL	Svetoslav Slavov (to Botev Ihtiman)
27	DF	BUL	Hristo Mitev (to Beroe)
96	MF	BUL	Dzhaner Sadetinov (to Hebar)
99	FW	BUL	Zhuliyan Ivanov (to Lokomotiv Gorna Oryahovitsa)

=== CSKA Sofia II ===
In:

No.	Pos.	Nation	Player
12	GK	BUL	Martin Kaishev (from Chernomorets Burgas)
18	FW	BUL	Lyubomir Kostov (from Slavia Sofia)
20	DF	BUL	Martin Stoychev (loan return from Botev Vratsa)

Out:

No.	Pos.	Nation	Player
7	FW	BUL	Mark-Emilio Papazov (to Lokomotiv Sofia)
23	MF	BUL	Ilian Antonov (to Slavia Sofia)
24	MF	BUL	Abdula Kichukov (on loan to Botev Vratsa)
93	DF	BUL	Denis Dinev (to Beroe)

=== Dobrudzha ===
In:

No.	Pos.	Nation	Player
1	GK	BUL	Denislav Stoychev (from Chernomorets Balchik)
7	FW	BUL	Petar Prindzhev (on loan from Spartak Varna)
9	MF	BUL	Biser Bonev (free agent)
11	MF	BUL	Viktor Mitev (from Fratria)
17	FW	BUL	Kristiyan Yovov (on loan from Spartak Varna)
20	MF	BUL	Nikola Vladev (from Chernomorets Balchik)
23	FW	BUL	Daniel Halachev (on loan from Spartak Varna)
27	DF	BUL	Borislav Vakadinov (from Beroe)
28	DF	BUL	Miroslav Pushkarov (from (Football Federation of Kosovo) Liria)
31	DF	BUL	Petar Vutsov (from Minyor Pernik)
44	MF	BLR	Vladimir Medved (from Slavia Sofia)
45	DF	BUL	Kristiyan Beshev (from Lokomotiv Mezdra)
70	DF	BUL	Dimitar Gospodinov (from Sozopol)

Out:

No.	Pos.	Nation	Player
7	MF	BUL	Anton Ivanov (to Spartak Varna)
9	FW	GBS	Valdu Té (to (Portuguese Football Federation) Alcochetense)
10	MF	POR	Tomás Silva (to Spartak Varna)
11	MF	POR	Boubacar Hanne (to Spartak Varna)
13	GK	BUL	Galin Grigorov (released)
15	DF	BUL	Bogdan Kostov (to Botev Plovdiv)
20	MF	BUL	Aykut Ramadan (to Beroe)
22	DF	COL	Jhonatan Cuero (on loan to Spartak Varna)
37	DF	BUL	Ventsislav Kerchev (to Cherno More)
45	DF	BUL	Dzhan Hasan (to Montana)
69	GK	BUL	Plamen Pepelyashev (to Dunav Ruse)
70	DF	BUL	Kolyo Stanev (to Yantra)
72	DF	POR	Vasco Oliveira (to Spartak Varna)
77	DF	BRA	Matheus Leoni (to (Slovak Football Association) Komárno)
99	FW	BUL	Georgi Trifonov (to Spartak Varna)
—	MF	BRA	José Neto (to Spartak Varna, previously on loan to Sportist Svoge)

=== Etar ===
In:

No.	Pos.	Nation	Player
20	MF	BUL	Martin Borisov (on loan from Levski Sofia II)
21	MF	BUL	Ivaylo Markov (from Lokomotiv Plovdiv, previously on loan)
25	FW	BUL	Stiviyan Makaveev (from Sevlievo)

Out:

No.	Pos.	Nation	Player
27	FW	BUL	Stivan Stoyanchov (loan return to Levski Sofia II)

=== Fratria ===
In:

No.	Pos.	Nation	Player
1	GK	BUL	Mario Mladenov (from Dunav Ruse)
2	DF	BUL	Dimitar Yaramov (from Belasitsa Petrich)
7	MF	UKR	Denys Yanakov (from (Romanian Football Federation) Unirea Slobozia)
9	FW	BUL	Denislav Angelov (from Yantra)
11	DF	BUL	Velislav Boev (from Yantra)
14	DF	BUL	Viktorio Valkov (from Beroe)
17	MF	ESP	Bilal Kandoussi (from (Royal Spanish Football Federation) Arenteiro)
18	DF	BUL	David Mihalev (from Sevlievo)
23	MF	BUL	Stanislav Dyulgerov (from Yantra)
44	DF	BUL	Rosen Stefanov (from Cherno More)
76	MF	ESP	Diego Gutiérrez (from (Royal Spanish Football Federation) Cacereño)

Out:

No.	Pos.	Nation	Player
7	MF	BUL	Ayvan Angelov (to Yantra)
9	MF	BUL	Denis Kadir (to Septemvri Tervel)
10	FW	NED	Xavello Druiventak (to (Italian Football Federation) Cesena)
11	MF	BUL	Viktor Mitev (to Dobrudzha)
19	MF	BUL	Stefan Statev (to Nesebar)
23	MF	UKR	Ivan Brikner (to Chernomorets Burgas)
25	FW	BUL	Daniel Halachev (loan return to Spartak Varna)
33	GK	MDA	Igor Mostovei (to (Lithuanian Football Federation) TransINVEST)
98	FW	BUL	Valentin Yoskov (to Chernomorets Burgas)

=== Hebar ===
In:

No.	Pos.	Nation	Player
6	DF	BUL	Miroslav Georgiev (from Pirin Blagoevgrad)
9	FW	BUL	Mariyan Vangelov (on loan from Lokomotiv Plovdiv)
18	MF	BUL	Plamen Arshev (from Lokomotiv Gorna Oryahovitsa)
19	FW	SUR	Yahcuroo Roemer (from Lokomotiv Gorna Oryahovitsa)
96	MF	BUL	Dzhaner Sadetinov (from Chernomorets Burgas)
—	DF	SEN	Christian Cabo (from (Senegalese Football Federation) Génération Foot)

Out:

No.	Pos.	Nation	Player
2	MF	BUL	Stefan Kamenov (to Montana)
5	DF	BUL	Adrian Vidinov (to Kyustendil)
7	MF	BUL	Momchil Tsvetanov (to Krumovgrad)
10	FW	BUL	Todor Chavorski (to Minyor Pernik)
14	DF	BUL	Kostadin Velchev (to Spartak Pleven)
17	DF	BUL	Georgi Valchev (to Beroe)
18	DF	BUL	Stoyan Pergelov (to Nesebar)
20	DF	BUL	Viktor Lyubenov (loan return to Levski Sofia II)
27	MF	BUL	Emil Martinov (to Rilski Sportist)
70	MF	BUL	Samuil Mechev (to Botev Vratsa)

=== Lokomotiv Gorna Oryahovitsa ===
In:

No.	Pos.	Nation	Player
1	GK	UKR	Hennadiy Hanyev (from Sevlievo)
3	DF	UKR	Yegor Romanyuk (on loan from CSKA 1948)
4	DF	GHA	Christopher Acheampong (on loan from CSKA 1948)
6	MF	BUL	Martin Todorski (from Belasitsa Petrich)
7	MF	BUL	Boyan Rangelov (from (Italian Football Federation) Sorrento U19)
8	MF	POR	Tiago Matos (from (Portuguese Football Federation) Marco 09)
9	FW	BUL	Zhuliyan Ivanov (from Chernomorets Burgas)
10	MF	BUL	Ivan Avramov (from Sevlievo)
11	DF	BUL	Dimitar Iliev (from Belasitsa Petrich)
17	MF	BUL	Spas Georgiev (from Botev Vratsa)
20	FW	POR	Mauro Ribeiro (from (Portuguese Football Federation) Marco 09)
21	MF	BUL	Stoil Yordanov (on loan from CSKA 1948 U17)

Out:

No.	Pos.	Nation	Player
1	GK	BUL	Ventsislav Dimitrov (released)
4	MF	BUL	Zahari Atanasov (loan return to Septemvri Sofia)
7	FW	SUR	Yahcuroo Roemer (to Hebar)
8	DF	BUL	Kristiyan Hristov (released)
9	FW	BUL	Ivan Vasilev (to (Oman Football Association) Saham Club)
10	MF	BUL	Daniel-Viktor Kanchev (to Sevlievo)
15	MF	BUL	Plamen Arshev (to Hebar)
21	MF	BUL	Milen Savov (to Sevlievo)

=== Ludogorets Razgrad II ===
In:

No.	Pos.	Nation	Player

Out:

No.	Pos.	Nation	Player
32	DF	ESP	Pipa (to (Royal Spanish Football Federation) Sabadell)
51	MF	BUL	Valentin Karchev (to Sportist Svoge)
67	GK	BUL	Damyan Hristov (to Cherno More)
73	FW	BUL	Filip Gigov (to Botev Vratsa)
80	MF	BUL	Metodiy Stefanov (to Pirin Blagoevgrad)
90	FW	BUL	Petar Kirev (to Marek)

=== Marek ===
In:

No.	Pos.	Nation	Player
9	FW	BUL	Petar Kirev (from Ludogorets II)
10	FW	BUL	Nikolay Ganchev (free agent)
11	FW	SRB	Marko Miletić (on loan from Slavia Sofia)
23	DF	BUL	Emil Viyachki (from Arda)
45	MF	BUL	Anzhelo Kyuchukov (from Germaneya)

Out:

No.	Pos.	Nation	Player
6	FW	BUL	Svetoslav Dikov (to Minyor Pernik)
9	FW	BUL	Iliya Dimitrov (to Rilski Sportist)
10	FW	BUL	Kitan Vasilev (to Strumska Slava)
17	MF	BUL	Kristiyan Nikiforov (on loan to Strumska Slava)
77	MF	BUL	Simeon Veshev (to Beroe)
99	DF	BUL	Borislav Vakadinov (to Beroe)

=== Montana ===
In:

No.	Pos.	Nation	Player
3	MF	BUL	Hristo Ivanov (from Lokomotiv Mezdra)
4	DF	SRB	Dejan Kuzmanovic (from (Football Association of Slovenia) Rudar Velenje)
5	DF	BUL	Dimitar Avramov (from Chernomorets Burgas)
6	MF	BUL	Kristiyan Valkov (from Belasitsa Petrich)
7	MF	BUL	Martin Milushev (from Pirin Blagoevgrad)
10	MF	BUL	Stefan Kamenov (from Hebar)
11	FW	BUL	Olcay Aliev (from Maritsa Plovdiv)
12	GK	BUL	Yulian Veskov (loan return from Sportist Svoge)
13	DF	BUL	Vladi Laskov (from Septemvri Simitli)
14	FW	BEN	Steve Traoré (from (Football Association of Finland) Haka)
18	DF	BUL	Mario Balakov (from Sportist Svoge)
20	MF	BUL	Georgi Karakashev (from Belasitsa Petrich)
23	FW	BUL	Hasan Strandzhev (from Pirin Gotse Delchev)
25	MF	BUL	Velislav Vasilev (from Pirin Blagoevgrad)
—	DF	BUL	Dzhan Hasan (from Dobrudzha)
—	MF	BUL	Ivelin Georgiev (from Sportist Svoge)

Out:

No.	Pos.	Nation	Player
3	DF	SWE	Albin Linnér (released)
5	DF	BUL	Ivaylo Markov (end of contract)
6	MF	NOR	Vajebah Sakor (end of contract)
7	FW	BUL	Boris Dimitrov (loan return to CSKA 1948)
9	FW	NGR	Philip Ejike (to (Football Federation of Armenia) Alashkert)
10	DF	BUL	Aleksandar Todorov (to Cherno More)
11	MF	BRA	Victor Oliveira (end of contract)
13	DF	CPV	Jorginho Soares (end of contract)
14	DF	BUL	Dimitar Burov (to Slavia Sofia)
15	DF	GHA	Christopher Acheampong (loan return to CSKA 1948)
16	DF	ESP	David Carmona (to (Kazakhstan Football Federation) Ulytau)
17	MF	BUL	Ivan Kokonov (to Yantra)
18	DF	BUL	Kostadin Iliev (to CSKA 1948)
20	FW	GBS	Umaro Baldé (to Slavia Sofia)
21	MF	BUL	Petar Andreev (to Cherno More)
23	MF	BUL	Anton Tungarov (to Vihren)
24	MF	GRE	Angelos Tsingaras (to (Hellenic Football Federation) Larissa)
25	DF	NGR	Solomon James (to (Lithuanian Football Federation) Tauras)

=== Nesebar ===
In:

No.	Pos.	Nation	Player
3	DF	BUL	Danail Lastardzhiev (from Septemvri Sofia II)
10	MF	BUL	Valentin Dotsev (from Minyor Pernik)
19	MF	ALG	Mohamed Bylel (from (French Football Federation) Plabennec)
20	MF	BUL	Petko Bonev (from Chermonorets Burgas II)
21	DF	BUL	Stoyan Pergelov (from Hebar)
22	MF	BUL	Ramis Ismailov (from Neftochimic)
77	MF	BUL	Stefan Statev (from Fratria)

Out:

No.	Pos.	Nation	Player
6	MF	BUL	Gencho Dalev (to Neftochimic)
10	FW	BUL	Galin Dimov (to Neftochimic)
11	FW	BUL	Kaloyan Nedev (to (Italian Football Federation) Lazio U17)
15	MF	BUL	Kosta Dalev (to Neftochimic)

=== Pirin Blagoevgrad ===
In:

No.	Pos.	Nation	Player
3	DF	BUL	Deyan Ivanov (from Slavia Sofia II)
5	DF	BUL	Yordan Kostov (from Septemvri Simitli)
10	FW	BUL	Toni Tasev (from Belasitsa Petrich)
11	MF	BUL	Roman Rodopski (from Sevlievo)
23	DF	BUL	Kristiyan Kurbanov (from Spartak Varna)
44	DF	BUL	Miki Orachev (from Minyor Pernik)
80	MF	BUL	Metodiy Stefanov (from Ludogorets II)

Out:

No.	Pos.	Nation	Player
4	DF	BUL	Georgi Korichkov (released)
7	FW	BUL	Kristiyan Bachev (to Belasitsa Petrich)
10	MF	BUL	Martin Milushev (to Montana)
11	MF	BUL	Velislav Vasilev (to Montana)
13	MF	BUL	Evgeni Georgiev (to Belasitsa Petrich)
17	DF	BUL	Miroslav Georgiev (to Hebar)
23	MF	BUL	Lazar Stoychev (released)
77	FW	BUL	Viktor Dobrev (to Sportist Svoge)

=== Rilski Sportist ===
In:

No.	Pos.	Nation	Player
1	GK	BUL	Ivaylo Nedelchev (from Arda)
3	DF	NED	José de Almeida Reis (from (Royal Dutch Football Association) Excelsior)
8	MF	BUL	David Dzhorov (from Strumska Slava)
9	FW	BUL	Iliya Dimitrov (from Marek)
11	MF	BUL	Valeri Bozhinov (from Lokomotiv Plovdiv)
14	MF	BUL	Emil Martinov (from Hebar)
33	DF	BUL	Pavlin Chilikov (from Minyor Pernik)
88	MF	BUL	Teodor Totev (from Chernomorets Balchik)
98	MF	BUL	Georgi Tartov (from Pirin Gotse Delchev)

Out:

No.	Pos.	Nation	Player
10	MF	BUL	Krasimir Panchev (to Botev Ihtiman)
20	MF	BUL	Filip Angelov (to Minyor Pernik)
21	MF	BUL	Milen Ivanov (to Kyustendil)
45	FW	BUL	Grigor Dolapchiev (to Oborishte Panagyurishte)
77	MF	BUL	Kristiyan Kochilov (released)
91	FW	BUL	Ventsislav Hristov (released)

=== Spartak Pleven ===
In:

No.	Pos.	Nation	Player
8	DF	BUL	Rosen Marinov (from Botev Vratsa, previously on loan)
21	MF	BUL	Kostadin Velchev (from Hebar)
25	FW	BUL	Preslav Antonov (from Sevlievo)

Out:

No.	Pos.	Nation	Player
7	DF	BUL	Vasil Bozhinov (released)
13	MF	BUL	Lyubomir Karakashev (to Belasitsa Petrich)
15	FW	FRA	Abdul Fofana (to Sportist Svoge)
21	DF	MDA	Petar Gospodinov (to Septemvri Sofia)

=== Sportist Svoge ===
In:

No.	Pos.	Nation	Player
5	DF	BUL	Miroslav Boyanov (from Bansko)
6	FW	BUL	Viktor Dobrev (from Pirin Blagoevgrad)
7	MF	BUL	Antonio Popov (on loan from Slavia Sofia II)
10	FW	BUL	Daniel Nachev (from Strumska Slava)
19	DF	BUL	Hristo Petrov (from Belasitsa Petrich)
23	FW	BUL	Dimitar Ivanov (from Belasitsa Petrich)
88	DF	BUL	Valentin Karchev (from Ludogorets Razgrad II)
99	FW	FRA	Abdul Fofana (from Spartak Pleven)

Out:

No.	Pos.	Nation	Player
7	DF	BUL	Aleksandar Bozhilov (loan return to CSKA Sofia II)
9	FW	BUL	Vasil Dimitrov (released)
10	FW	BUL	Kristiyan Yovov (loan return to Levski Sofia II)
15	DF	BUL	Kristiyan Atanasov (released)
16	MF	BUL	Spas Georgiev (loan return to Botev Vratsa)
17	DF	BUL	Tomas Dobrev (to Minyor Pernik)
19	DF	BUL	Mario Balakov (to Montana)
21	MF	BUL	Kristian Chachev (loan return to Lokomotiv Sofia)
23	MF	BRA	José Neto (loan return to Dobrudzha)
33	GK	BUL	Yulian Veskov (loan return to Montana)
87	MF	BUL	Ivelin Georgiev (to Montana)
99	DF	GRE	Christos Mitsis (released)

=== Vihren ===
In:

No.	Pos.	Nation	Player
9	FW	BUL	Kaloyan Krastev (from Belasitsa Petrich)
11	MF	BUL	Daniel Pehlivanov (from (Swiss Football Association) Locarno)
22	MF	BUL	Anton Tungarov (from Montana)
26	DF	BUL	Kamen Hadzhiev (from Dunav Ruse)
29	FW	BUL	Preslav Yordanov (from Minyor Pernik)
77	FW	BUL	Borislav Marinov (from Septemvri Sofia)
99	GK	BUL	Aleksandar Mihaylov (from Strumska Slava)

Out:

No.	Pos.	Nation	Player
2	DF	BUL	Martin Bachev (released)
14	MF	BUL	Ivaylo Klimentov (to Chernomorets Burgas)
19	DF	TUN	Maroine Mihoubi (to (Luxembourg Football Federation) US Hostert)
22	MF	TUN	Hassan Ayari (released)
31	GK	BUL	Petar Debarliev (to Gigant Saedinenie)
71	FW	BRA	Robert Bebê (released)

=== Yantra ===
In:

No.	Pos.	Nation	Player
7	DF	BUL	Kolyo Stanev (from Dobrudzha)
10	MF	BUL	Ayvan Angelov (from Fratria)
11	DF	BUL	Aleksandar Georgiev (from Spartak Varna)
18	MF	BUL	Martin Portarski (from National Sofia)
21	MF	BUL	Ivan Kokonov (from Montana)

Out:

No.	Pos.	Nation	Player
7	MF	BUL	Georgi Babaliev (to (Kyrgyz Football Union) Alay)
8	MF	BUL	Stanislav Dyulgerov (to Fratria)
9	FW	BUL	Denislav Angelov (to Fratria)
19	FW	BUL	Georgi Dimitrov (end of contract)
21	MF	BUL	Bozhidar Penchev (loan return to Botev Vratsa)
22	DF	BUL	Velislav Boev (to Fratria)
