= 2016–17 Second Professional Football League (Bulgaria) =

Second Professional Football League
- Season: 2016–17
- Dates: 6 August 2016 – 27 May 2017
- Champions: Etar
- Promoted: Etar; Septemvri Sofia; Vitosha Bistritsa
- Relegated: CSKA Sofia II; Spartak Pleven; Bansko; Levski Karlovo
- Matches: 240
- Goals: 632 (2.63 per match)
- Top goalscorer: Dimitar Georgiev (18)
- Best goalkeeper: Martin Temenliev (13 clean sheets)
- Biggest home win: Etar 6–0 Nesebar (30 November 2016); Lokomotiv Sofia 6–0 Levski Karlovo (4 December 2016)
- Biggest away win: Botev Galabovo 0–5 Septemvri Sofia (1 April 2017)
- Highest scoring: Tsarsko Selo 5–3 Botev Vratsa (27 May 2017)
- Longest winning run: 6 games by Pomorie
- Longest unbeaten run: 11 games by Sozopol
- Longest winless run: 10 games by Bansko
- Longest losing run: 9 games by Levski Karlovo
- All statistics correct as of 27 May 2017.

The 2016–17 Second League was the 61st season of the Bulgarian Second League, the second tier of the Bulgarian football league system and the 1st season under this name and current league structure.

A total of 16 teams contested the league in a similar format to the B Group: 7 of which returning from the 2015–16 season, 7 of which promoted from third division and the reserves teams of Ludogorets Razgrad and CSKA Sofia.

== Stadia and locations ==
Location of teams in 2016–17 Second League

Team	City	Stadium	Capacity
Bansko	Bansko	Saint Peter	3,000
Botev	Galabovo	Energitik	3,000
Botev	Vratsa	Hristo Botev	32,000
CSKA II	Sofia	Balgarska Armia	22,995
Etar	Veliko Tarnovo	Ivaylo	25,000
Levski	Karlovo	Vasil Levski	6,000
Lokomotiv	Sofia	Lokomotiv	22,000
Ludogorets II	Razgrad	Eagles' Nest	2,000
Nesebar	Nesebar	Nesebar Stadium	7,000
Oborishte	Panagyurishte	Orcho Voyvoda	3,000
Pomorie	Pomorie	Pomorie Stadium	3,000
Sozopol	Sozopol	Arena Sozopol	3,500
Spartak	Pleven	Pleven Stadium	22,000
Septemvri	Sofia	Dragalevtsi	1,700
Tsarsko Selo	Sofia	Tsarsko Selo	2,000
Vitosha	Bistritsa	Bistritsa Stadium	2,000

== Personnel and sponsorship ==
Note: Flags indicate national team as has been defined under FIFA eligibility rules. Players and managers may hold more than one non-FIFA nationality.

Team	Manager	Captain	Kit manufacturer	Shirt sponsor	Kit sponsor
Bansko	(Bulgaria) Petko Medvetski	(Bulgaria) Ivan Topuzov	adidas		
Botev Galabovo	(Bulgaria) Ivan Vutov	(Bulgaria) Georgi Kirilov	KRASIKO	Galabovo Municipality	Knauf
Botev Vratsa	(Bulgaria) Sasho Angelov	(Bulgaria) Todor Gochev	Jumper	WinBet	
CSKA Sofia II	(Bulgaria) Svetoslav Todorov	(Bulgaria) Petar Vitanov	adidas	Mtel	WinBet
Etar Veliko Tarnovo	(Bulgaria) Stanislav Genchev	(Bulgaria) Kiril Akalski	Joma		
Levski Karlovo	(Bulgaria) Krasimir Manolov	(Bulgaria) Yanko Valkanov	Saller	Karlovo Municipality	
Lokomotiv Sofia	(Bulgaria) Yavor Valchinov	(Bulgaria) Daniel Peev	Joma		
Ludogorets Razgrad II	(Bulgaria) Radoslav Zdravkov	(Bulgaria) Preslav Petrov	Macron	bet365	Vivacom, Spetema
Nesebar	(Bulgaria) Nikolay Rusev	(Bulgaria) Nikolay Kostov	Joma		
Oborishte Panagyurishte	(Bulgaria) Emil Velev	(Bulgaria) Anatoli Todorov	KRASIKO	Asarel Medet	
Pomorie	(Bulgaria) Malin Orachev	(Bulgaria) Georgi Petkov	Joma	Pomorie Municipality	Efbet
Sozopol	(Bulgaria) Rumen Dimov	(Bulgaria) Ivan Yanchev	KRASIKO		
Spartak Pleven	(Bulgaria) Momchil Chelestinov (caretaker)	(Bulgaria) Tihomir Todorov	adidas		
Septemvri Sofia	(Bulgaria) Hristo Arangelov	(Bulgaria) Valentin Galev	Joma		
Tsarsko Selo Sofia	(Bulgaria) Nikola Spasov	(Bulgaria) Simeon Ganchev	Joma		
Vitosha Bistritsa	(Bulgaria) Kostadin Angelov	(Bulgaria) Chetin Sadula	Jumper	Efbet	

Note: Individual clubs may wear jerseys with advertising. However, only one sponsorship is permitted per jersey for official tournaments organised by UEFA in addition to that of the kit manufacturer (exceptions are made for non-profit organisations). Clubs in the domestic league can have more than one sponsorship per jersey which can feature on the front of the shirt, incorporated with the main sponsor or in place of it; or on the back, either below the squad number or on the collar area. Shorts also have space available for advertisement.

== Managerial changes ==
Team	Outgoing manager	Manner of departure	Date of vacancy	Position in table	Incoming manager	Date of appointment
Botev Vratsa	(Bulgaria) Dimitar Mutafov	End of caretaker tenure	31 May 2016	Pre-season	(Bulgaria) Boyko Velichkov	8 June 2016
Bansko	(Bulgaria) Ivan Atanasov	Mutual consent	23 June 2016	Pre-season	(Bulgaria) Petko Medvetski	23 June 2016
Lokomotiv Sofia	(Bulgaria) Anton Velkov	Resigned	5 July 2016	Pre-season	(Bulgaria) Angel Kolev	5 July 2016
Etar	(Bulgaria) Ferario Spasov	Resigned	1 August 2016	Pre-season	(Bulgaria) Sasho Angelov	5 August 2016
Etar	(Bulgaria) Sasho Angelov	Resigned	10 August 2016	10th	(Bulgaria) Iliyan Kiryakov (caretaker)	13 August 2016
Etar	(Bulgaria) Iliyan Kiryakov	End of caretaker tenure	20 August 2016	2nd	(Bulgaria) Georgi Vasilev	20 August 2016
Spartak Pleven	(Bulgaria) Diyan Donchev	Resigned	30 August 2016	10th	(Bulgaria) Ferario Spasov	31 August 2016
Septemvri Sofia	(Bulgaria) Nikolay Mitov	Signed by Botev Plovdiv	30 August 2016	1st	(Bulgaria) Hristo Arangelov	30 September 2016
Septemvri Sofia	(Bulgaria) Hristo Arangelov	Mutual consent	3 September 2016	1st	(Bulgaria) Nikolay Mitov	3 September 2016
Botev Galabovo	(Bulgaria) Dimcho Markov	Mutual consent	14 October 2016	11th	(Bulgaria) Nikola Nikolov (caretaker)	14 October 2016
Spartak Pleven	(Bulgaria) Ferario Spasov	Resigned	15 October 2016	12th	(Bulgaria) Boyko Tsvetkov	17 October 2016
Oborishte	(Bulgaria) Tancho Kalpakov	Resigned	17 October 2016	14th	(Bulgaria) Emil Velev	17 October 2016
Tsarsko Selo	(Bulgaria) Todor Yanchev	Resigned	29 October 2016	8th	(Bulgaria) Nikola Spasov	29 October 2016
Botev Vratsa	(Bulgaria) Boyko Velichkov	Resigned	22 November 2016	7th	(Bulgaria) Sasho Angelov	23 November 2016
CSKA Sofia II	(Bulgaria) Stamen Belchev	Promoted to CSKA Sofia	27 November 2016	5th	(Bulgaria) Ivaylo Stanev (caretaker)	28 November 2016
Lokomotiv Sofia	(Bulgaria) Angel Kolev	Promoted to Director of football	20 December 2016	11th	(Bulgaria) Yavor Valchinov	20 December 2016
Botev Galabovo	(Bulgaria) Nikola Nikolov	End of caretaker tenure	31 December 2016	14th	(Bulgaria) Ivan Vutov	1 January 2017
Etar	(Bulgaria) Georgi Vasilev	Resigned	3 January 2017	1st	(Bulgaria) Stanislav Genchev	8 January 2017
Spartak Pleven	(Bulgaria) Boyko Tsvetkov	Mutual consent	4 January 2017	10th	(Bulgaria) Aleksandar Georgiev	4 January 2017
CSKA Sofia II	(Bulgaria) Ivaylo Stanev	End of caretaker tenure	9 January 2017	8th	(Bulgaria) Svetoslav Todorov	9 January 2017
Ludogorets Razgrad II	(Bulgaria) Galin Ivanov	Demoted to assistant	15 January 2017	13th	(Bulgaria) Radoslav Zdravkov	15 January 2017
Septemvri Sofia	(Bulgaria) Nikolay Mitov	Signed by Levski Sofia	2 March 2017	1st	(Bulgaria) Hristo Arangelov	2 March 2017
Spartak Pleven	(Bulgaria) Aleksandar Georgiev	Resigned	6 May 2017	14th	(Bulgaria) Momchil Chelestinov (caretaker)	9 May 2017

== League table ==
Pos	Team	Pld	W	D	L	GF	GA	GD	Pts	Promotion, qualification or relegation
1	Etar (C, P)	30	17	10	3	52	27	+25	61	Promotion to the First League
2	Septemvri Sofia (O, P)	30	17	8	5	52	26	+26	59	Qualification for the promotion play-offs
3	Vitosha Bistritsa (O, P)	30	15	8	7	37	23	+14	53	Qualification for the promotion play-offs
4	Sozopol	30	14	8	8	38	25	+13	50	
5	Tsarsko Selo	30	14	6	10	54	39	+15	48	Ineligible for promotion
6	Lokomotiv Sofia	30	13	8	9	47	34	+13	47 (Note: POM 2–0 LSO; LSO 3–0 POM)	Ineligible for promotion
7	Pomorie	30	14	5	11	36	32	+4	47	
8	Ludogorets Razgrad II	30	13	5	12	39	33	+6	44	Ineligible for promotion
9	Nesebar	30	11	7	12	39	47	−8	40	
10	Botev Vratsa	30	9	11	10	42	41	+1	38	
11	Oborishte	30	10	7	13	30	39	−9	37	
12	Botev Galabovo	30	9	7	14	28	39	−11	34	
13	CSKA Sofia II (R)	30	9	6	15	44	49	−5	33 (Note: SPL 3–4 CSK; CSK 1–1 SPL)	Relegation to the Third League
14	Spartak Pleven (R)	30	9	6	15	44	52	−8	33	Relegation to the Third League
15	Bansko (R)	30	6	7	17	26	55	−29	25	Relegation to the Third League
16	Levski Karlovo (R)	30	5	1	24	24	71	−47	16	Relegation to the Third League

Source: bulgarian-football.com
Rules for classification: 1st points; 2nd head-to-head points; 3rd head-to-head goal difference; 4th head-to-head goals scored; 5th goal difference; 6th number of goals scored; 7th Fair-play points; 8th Draw
(C) Champions; (O) Play-off winners; (P) Promoted; (R) Relegated

== Results ==
Home \ Away	BAN	GAL	BVR	CSK	ETA	LEK	LSO	LUD	NES	OBO	POM	SOZ	SPL	SEP	TSS	VIT
Bansko		0–0	1–3	2–1	0–0	0–2	1–4	0–0	2–0	0–0	1–2	0–2	4–3	0–1	1–1	1–3
Botev Galabovo	1–0		1–3	3–2	0–2	2–0	2–1	2–0	1–0	1–0	2–3	1–0	0–1	0–5	0–1	0–0
Botev Vratsa	4–0	1–1		3–2	3–3	2–1	0–0	0–0	2–2	2–1	2–1	0–2	1–1	0–0	1–2	2–4
CSKA Sofia II	3–2	2–1	2–1		2–3	1–1	2–1	0–2	2–0	1–0	0–1	0–1	1–1	1–1	1–2	0–1
Etar	2–0	2–1	1–1	2–2		2–1	3–1	3–0	6–0	0–0	2–1	3–1	3–0	2–1	0–0	1–0
Levski Karlovo	2–0	0–1	1–3	0–3	2–0		2–3	2–1	2–3	0–1	1–0	0–2	2–3	0–1	1–3	1–4
Lokomotiv Sofia	2–0	2–1	2–0	2–2	0–0	6–0		1–0	3–1	2–2	3–0	3–1	1–0	2–3	2–1	1–1
Ludogorets Razgrad II	4–1	2–0	0–2	3–2	1–0	2–1	0–0		3–0	1–1	4–0	2–0	4–2	1–3	2–1	0–1
Nesebar	4–1	1–1	2–0	0–0	2–2	4–0	2–1	1–4		3–0	0–1	0–0	3–1	1–2	2–1	1–0
Oborishte	1–3	3–2	1–0	3–1	1–2	4–0	2–1	2–1	0–0		1–1	2–0	2–1	2–0	0–3	0–0
Pomorie	0–1	1–0	0–0	2–1	2–0	1–0	2–0	0–1	3–1	5–1		0–1	2–2	1–2	1–1	1–0
Sozopol	0–0	3–2	1–0	0–2	1–1	4–0	0–0	2–0	3–3	2–0	0–0		3–1	1–0	2–2	3–0
Spartak Pleven	1–3	3–1	1–1	3–4	1–2	2–0	2–0	3–0	2–0	1–0	0–1	0–2		0–4	1–3	0–0
Septemvri Sofia	1–1	0–0	1–1	2–1	1–2	4–1	1–1	2–1	4–0	1–0	1–0	2–1	3–3		3–0	1–0
Tsarsko Selo	4–0	1–1	5–3	4–2	1–2	5–0	3–0	1–0	0–2	3–0	2–3	1–0	1–5	1–1		0–1
Vitosha Bistritsa	4–1	0–0	2–1	2–1	1–1	4–1	0–2	0–0	0–1	2–0	2–1	0–0	1–0	2–1	2–1	

Source: bulgarian-football.com
Legend: Blue = home team win; Yellow = draw; Red = away team win.

== Top scorers ==
As of matches played on 27 May 2017

Rank	Player	Club	Goals
1	(Bulgaria) Dimitar Georgiev	Lokomotiv Sofia	18
2	(Bulgaria) Simeon Ganchev	Tsarsko Selo	13
3	(Bulgaria) Kostadin Adzhov	Septemvri Sofia	12
3	(Bulgaria) Milcho Angelov	CSKA Sofia II	12
5	(Bulgaria) Georgi Fikiyn	Bansko	11
5	(France) Chris Gadi	Spartak Pleven	11
7	(Bulgaria) Georgi Kirilov	Botev Galabovo	10
7	(Bulgaria) Todor Chavorski	Botev Vratsa	10
7	(Bulgaria) Ahmed Ahmedov	Pomorie	10
7	(Bulgaria) Pavel Petkov (Note: Including 4 goals for Botev Vratsa.)	Tsarsko Selo	10
11	(Bulgaria) Stefan Hristov (Note: Including 4 goals for Spartak Pleven.)	Vitosha Bistritsa	9
11	(Bulgaria) Daniel Pehlivanov	Septemvri Sofia	9
13	(Bulgaria) Daniel Peev	Lokomotiv Sofia	8
13	(Bulgaria) Ivan Petkov	Etar	8
13	(Bulgaria) Svetoslav Dikov	Tsarsko Selo	8
13	(Bulgaria) Vladimir Aytov	Oborishte	8
13	(Bulgaria) Eray Karadayi	Nesebar	8
