= Umaro Baldé =

Umaro Baldé may refer to:

- Umaro Baldé (footballer, born 1999), a Portuguese born footballer, who represents Guinea-Bissau at international level
- Umaro Baldé (footballer, born 2002), a Guinea-Bissau born footballer, who represented Portugal at youth level
