= Pedro Ferreira =

Pedro Ferreira may refer to:

- Pedró Ferreira (footballer, born 1987), Portuguese footballer
- Pedro Ferreira (footballer, born 1991), Portuguese footballer
- Pedro Ferreira (footballer, born 1998), Portuguese footballer
- Pedro Ferreira (footballer, born 2000), Portuguese footballer
- Pedro Ferreira (footballer, born 2007), Brazilian footballer
- Pedro Ferreira (swimmer) (born 1977), Portuguese swimmer
- Pedro G. Ferreira (born 1968), British/Portuguese astrophysicist and author
- Pedro Ferreira (gymnast) (born 1997), Portuguese trampoline gymnast
