= Sebastian Wade =

English footballer (born 2003)

Personal information
- Full name: Sebastian John Wade Gardiner
- Date of birth: 9 April 2003 (age 23)
- Place of birth: Palma de Mallorca, Spain
- Height: 1.90 m (6 ft 3 in)
- Position: Defender

Team information
- Current team: Septemvri Sofia
- Number: 3

Youth career
- Sant Marçal
- Atlético Baleares
- –2019: Mallorca
- 2019–2022: Villarreal
- 2020–2021: → Roda (loan)
- 2022–2023: Torino
- 2023–2024: Shabab Al Ahli

Senior career*
Years	Team	Apps	(Gls)
2024–2025	Mallorca B	42	(2)
2025–	Septemvri Sofia	28	(1)
- * Club domestic league appearances and goals as of 10:41, 14 August 2026 (UTC)

Sebastian John Wade Gardiner (born 9 April 2003) is a English professional footballer who plays as a defender for Bulgarian First League club Septemvri Sofia.

== Career ==
Growing up in Mallorca, Wade played for local sides Sant Marçal, Atlético Baleares and Mallorca before signing a three-year deal with Villarreal in 2019. He spent the 2020–21 season on loan at the youth academy of Roda, making 19 appearances for their under–19 side in the División de Honor Juvenil. Between January 2022 and September 2023, he played for the academy of Italian side Torino. On 13 August 2022, Wade featured in Torino's senior squad for the first team, appeaering as an unused substitute during a victory over Monza. In September 2023, Wade signed for the academy of UAE Pro League side Shabab Al Ahli. In February 2024, Wade returned home to join Mallorca B. He finished the season by helping the club to promotion to Segunda Federación. On 27 September 2024, he featured on the bench as an unused substitute for the first time in a La Liga match. In August 2025, Wade signed for First Professional Football League side Septemvri Sofia.

== Personal life ==
Wade was born in Palma de Mallorca to an English father and a South African mother.
