= Martin Hristov (footballer, born 2003) =

Bulgarian footballer (born 2003)

Personal information
- Full name: Martin Hristov Hristov
- Date of birth: 2 October 2003 (age 23)
- Place of birth: Pazardzhik, Bulgaria
- Height: 1.85 m (6 ft 1 in)
- Position: Defender

Team information
- Current team: Septemvri Sofia
- Number: 4

Youth career
- Hebar Pazardzhik
- Botev Plovdiv

Senior career*
Years	Team	Apps	(Gls)
2021–2023	Botev Plovdiv II	55	(1)
2022–2025	Botev Plovdiv	2	(0)
2023–2024	→ Botev Vratsa (loan)	17	(0)
2024–2025	→ Septemvri Sofia (loan)	30	(1)
2025–	Septemvri Sofia	36	(1)

International career^{‡}
2019	Bulgaria U17	1	(0)
2021	Bulgaria U19	10	(0)
2022	Bulgaria U21	3	(0)
- * Club domestic league appearances and goals as of 26 May 2026 ‡ National team caps and goals as of 12:04, 11 March 2025 (UTC)

Martin Hristov Hristov (Bulgarian: Мартин Христов Христов; born 2 October 2003) is a Bulgarian professional footballer who plays as a defender for Septemvri Sofia.

== Career ==
Hristov began his career in Botev Plovdiv. In 2021 he made his debut for the second team, becoming a titular. He made his professional debut for Botev in a league match agnaist Lokomotiv Sofia on 1 June 2024.

In June 2023 he was sent on loan to Botev Vratsa. In June 2024 he resigned his contract with Botev Plovdiv. Few days later he was sent on loan to Septemvri Sofia until end of the season. Hristov become a regular starter for Septemvri and in March 2025 it was announced he would complete his permanent transfer to Septemvri in the summer.
