= Dimitar Vasev =

Bulgarian footballer and manager

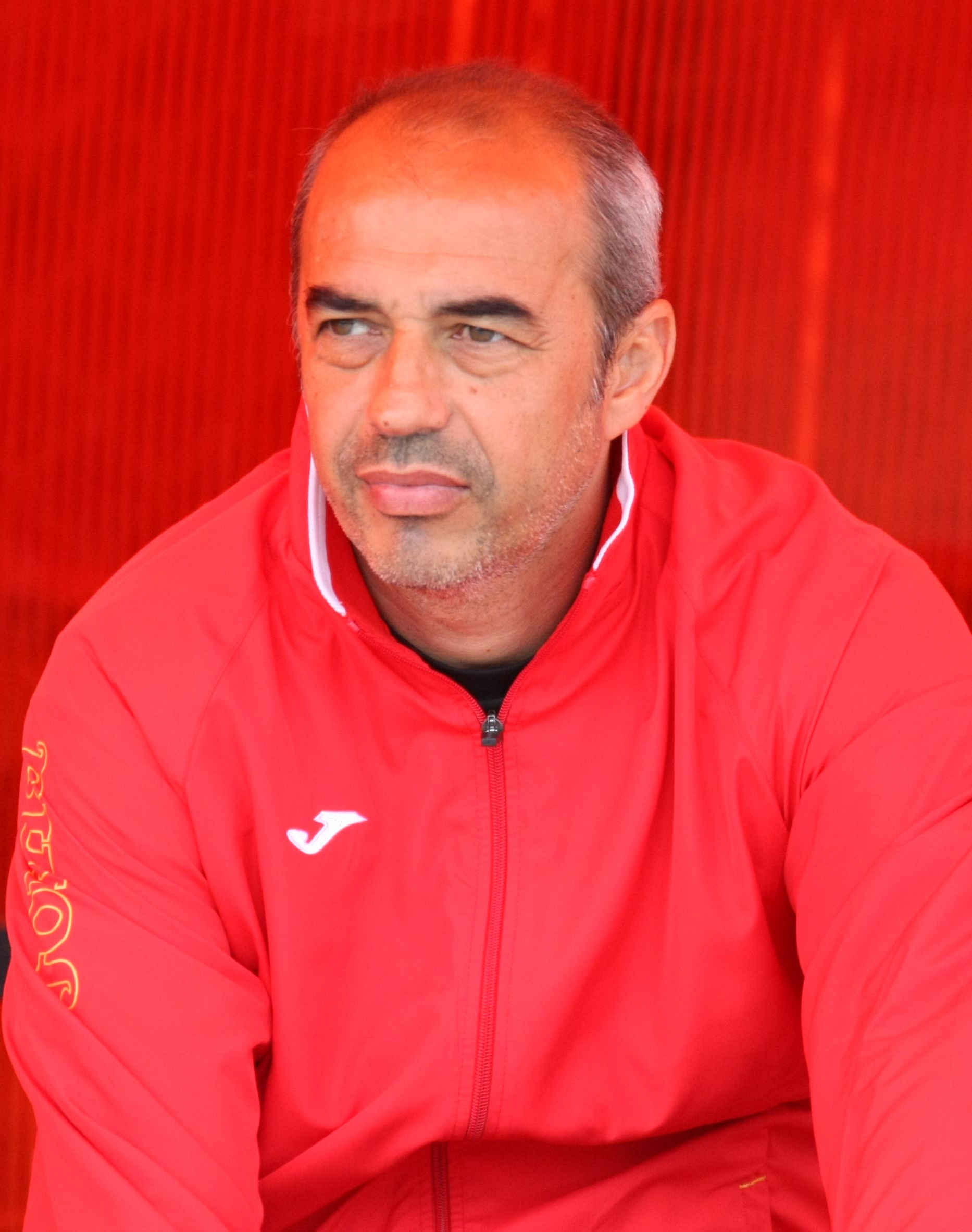

Personal information
- Full name: Dimitar Nikolaev Vasev
- Date of birth: 10 September 1965 (age 61)
- Place of birth: Sofia, Bulgaria
- Position: Defender

Youth career
- Lokomotiv Sofia

Senior career*
Years	Team	Apps	(Gls)
1983–1993	Lokomotiv Sofia	224	(8)
1993–1994	Lokomotiv Plovdiv	13	(0)
1994–1996	Lokomotiv Sofia	46	(2)
1997	Shanghai Shenhua	2	(0)
1998–2000	Lokomotiv Sofia	30	(3)
2000–2001	El Paso Patriots	26	(0)
2001	Lokomotiv Sofia	0	(0)
Total		341	(13)

International career
1988–1993	Bulgaria	17	(0)

Managerial career
- 2008–2010: Lokomotiv Sofia (Assistant)
- 2010: Lokomotiv Sofia
- 2014–2015: Lokomotiv Sofia
- 2017: Septemvri Sofia
- * Club domestic league appearances and goals

Dimitar Vasev (Bulgarian: Димитър Васев; born 10 September 1965) is a Bulgarian former football player and football manager lastly leading Septemvri Sofia.

== Career ==
=== Playing career ===
Born in Sofia, Dimitar Vasev played in his career for Lokomotiv Sofia, Lokomotiv Plovdiv, Chinese Shanghai Shenhua and Chivas El Paso Patriots.

=== Manager career ===
==== Lokomotiv Sofia ====
After being an assistant manager in his youth club Lokomotiv Sofia, on 31 May 2010 he was appointed as head manager of the team after leaving of Dragan Okuka, but was released from the club on 22 November 2010.

On 7 April 2014 he was appointed as a manager for a second time taking the charge from Stefan Genov. He was chosen by the Association of Professional Footballers in Bulgaria for best manager of season 2014-15 after qualifying the team on 3rd place in A Group, but the team failed to gain license and later was dissolved.

==== Septemvri Sofia ====
On 8 June 2017 Vasev was announced as the new manager of Septemvri Sofia with Hristo Arangelov, the caretaker manager after Nikolay Mitov's tenure, as his first assistant. He was released from the club on 23 August 2017 for bad results, stepping down from the position in favor of Nikolay Mitov.

== Managerial statistics ==
As of 23 August 2017

Team	From	To	Record							
Team	From	To	G	W	D	L	Win %	GF	GA	GD
Lokomotiv Sofia	1 July 2010	25 November 2010	12	7	1	4	58.33	25	12	+13
Lokomotiv Sofia	8 April 2014	1 July 2015	42	23	7	12	54.76	60	40	+20
Septemvri Sofia	8 June 2017	23 August 2017	5	1	0	4	20.00	1	6	-5
Total			59	31	8	20	52.54	76	58	+28

== Honours ==
=== As a player ===
Lokomotiv Sofia

- Bulgarian Cup
  - Winner (1): 1994-95
- A PFG
  - Runner-up (1): 1994-95

=== As a manager ===
Best manager for the 2014/2015 A PFG season - chosen by the Association of Professional Footballers in Bulgaria

== Personal life ==
His son Daniel is also a footballer who currently plays for Lokomotiv Sofia.
