= Hristo Arangelov =

Bulgarian footballer

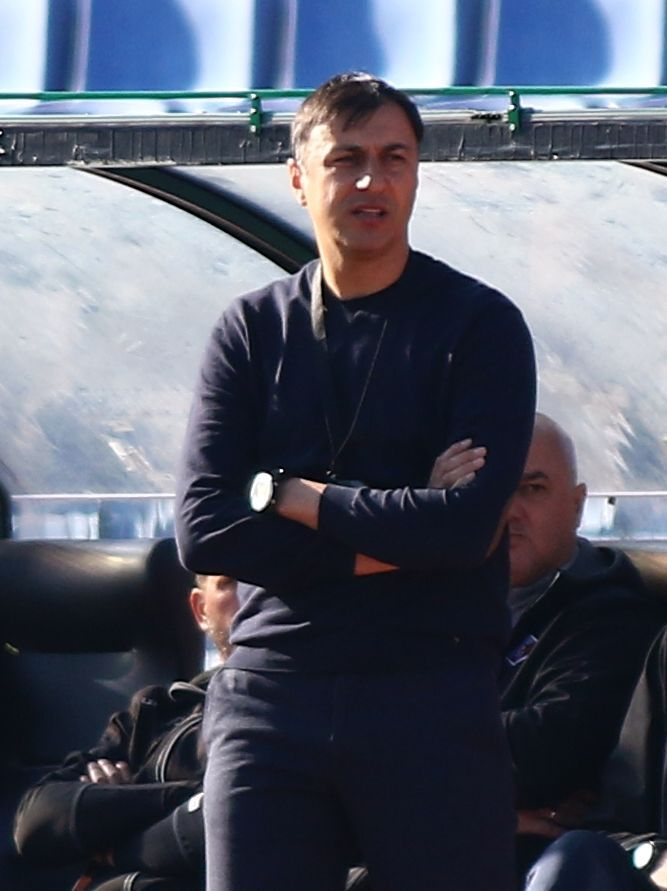

Personal information
- Full name: Hristo Arangelov
- Date of birth: 25 February 1978 (age 48)
- Place of birth: Sofia, Bulgaria
- Height: 1.81 m (5 ft 11 in)
- Position: Defender

Team information
- Current team: Septemvri Sofia (manager)

Youth career
- Levski Sofia

Senior career*
Years	Team	Apps	(Gls)
1997–1999	Pirin Blagoevgrad	34	(0)
1999–2000	Minyor Pernik	8	(0)
2001–2005	Marek Dupnitsa	57	(2)
2005	Dunav Ruse	8	(0)
2006	Hebar Pazardzhik	13	(0)
2006–2007	Spartak Varna	26	(1)
2007–2011	Balkan Botevgrad	80	(0)
Total		226	(3)

Managerial career
- 2013–2015: DIT Sofia (youth coach)
- 2015–2018: Septemvri Sofia (assistant)
- 2016: Septemvri Sofia (caretaker)
- 2017: Septemvri Sofia (caretaker)
- 2018–2019: Septemvri Sofia
- 2020–2021: Septemvri Sofia
- 2023: Levski Sofia (assistant)
- 2023–2024: Levski Sofia II
- 2024–2025: Lovech
- 2025: Pirin Blagoevgrad
- 2026: Septemvri Sofia
- * Club domestic league appearances and goals

Hristo Arangelov (Bulgarian: Христо Арангелов; born 25 February 1978) is a Bulgarian former footballer, and now manager.

He spent his playing career at Pirin Blagoevgrad, Minyor Pernik, Marek Dupnitsa, Dunav Ruse, Hebar Pazardzhik, Spartak Varna and Balkan Botevgrad.

== Managing career ==
=== Septemvri Sofia ===
In 2013 Arangelov joined DIT Sofia as a youth coach and in 2015 he became assistant manager in Septemvri Sofia since Dit Academy merged with the club.

He also served as a caretaker manager from the beginning of 2016 until the summer, since Nikolay Mitov joined Pirin Razlog. Mitov returned as manager of the team for 2016–17 season, but in March 2017 joined Levski Sofia and Arangelov stepped up on the managing position once again.

On 8 June 2017 Dimitar Vasev was announced as the new manager of Septemvri Sofia with Arangelov as a first assistant again.
