= PFC Septemvri Sofia =

Septemvri Sofia
- Full name: Football Club Septemvri Sofia
- Nicknames: The Blue-Reds; The Septembrians
- Founded: 5 November 1944; 82 years ago
- Ground: Stadion Dragalevtsi, Sofia
- Capacity: 1,500
- Chairman: Rumen Chandarov
- Head coach: Mladen Kašćelan
- League: First League
- 2024–25: First League, 12th of 16
- Website: fcseptemvri.com
Home colours	Away colours

FC Septemvri Sofia (Bulgarian: ФК Септември София) is a Bulgarian professional association football club based in Sofia, which currently competes in the First League, the top tier of Bulgarian football. Its home ground is the Septemvri Stadium, but due to its poor condition the team plays its home matches at the Stadion Dragalevtsi or on the Vasil Levski National Stadium.

The club's biggest success to date is the winning of the Bulgarian Cup in 1960 and finishing 5th in the Bulgarian first division during the same season. Septemvri is known for its strong youth academy, which over the years has developed numerous players for Bulgaria's elite clubs and the national team.

== History ==
=== Early ages ===
On November 5, 1944 the clubs Sportclub Sofia, Sokol and Vazrazhdane unite under the name of FC Septemvri Sofia; the name derives from the revolution of September 1944. On March 26, 1945, the additional clubs of Botev (Konyovitsa), Ustrem (Zaharna fabrika), Pobeda (Krasna Polyana), and Svoboda (Tri kladentsi) merge into the club. In May 1948, the club, then playing in the 1st Sofia Division, is briefly merged with second-division CDV/Chavdar (Sofia) and the unified club wins the 1948 Bulgarian Championship by overcoming Levski Sofia in the final.

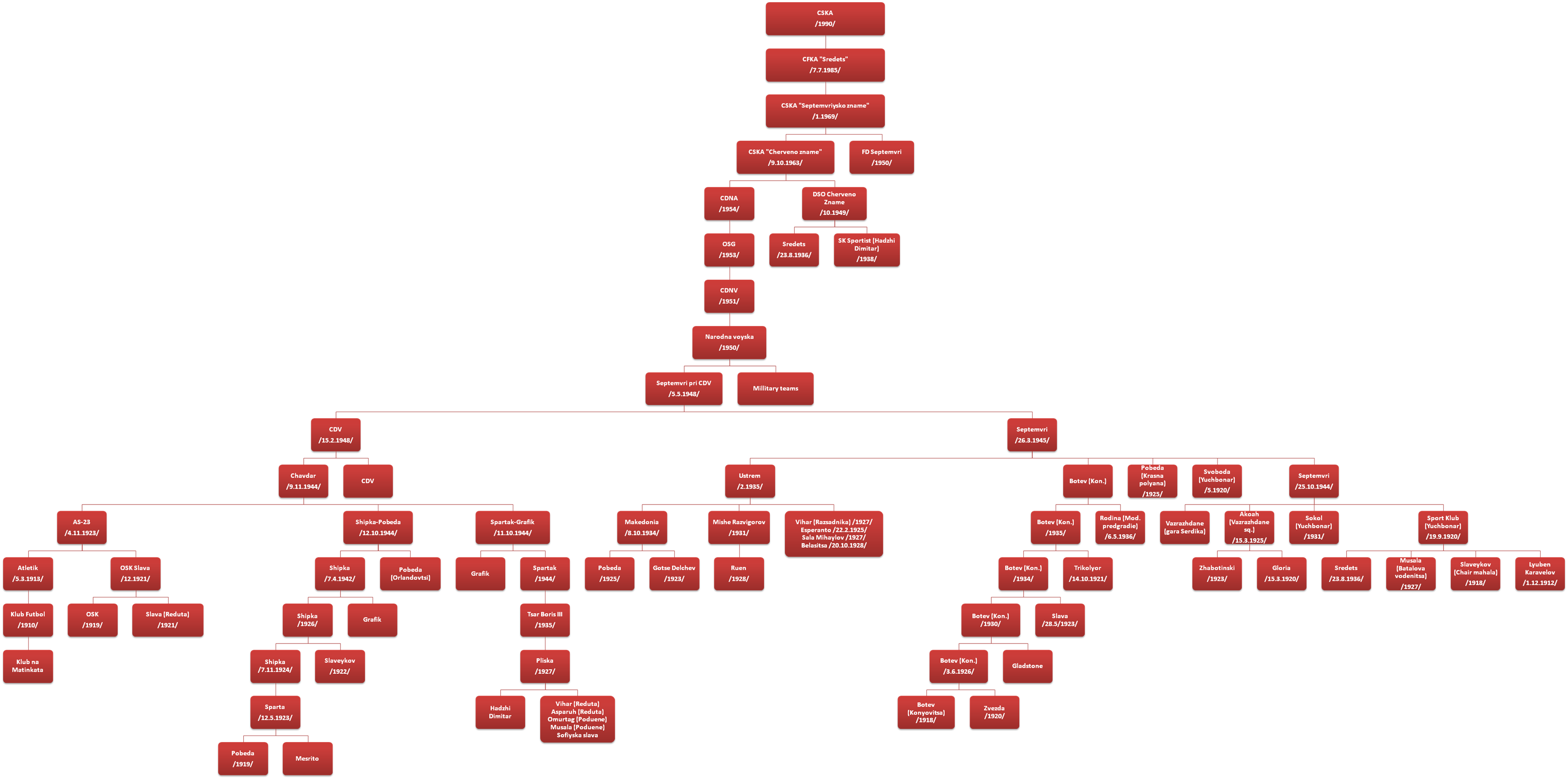
FC Septemvri's roots prior to merging with CSKA Sofia (see lower right corner)

Septemvri starts the 1948–49 season in the newly formed A Republican Football Group, but only six months later is separated from CDV (Chavdar) and removed from the division, with the current title given to CDNV, Chavdar's new name, which would ultimately become CSKA Sofia. At the end of the 1948–49 season, Septemvri is allowed to take part in a two-match play-off for entering first division against Marek Dupnitsa. After both matches end with a 2:0 win for each team, a third game is played in which Septemvri falls 1:0 and remains in second division.

From 1949 to 1969, Septemvri existed as an independent club, during which period it reached the height of its success. In 1959, the club finished first in the B PFG and was promoted to the first division for the 1959–60 season. That same season, Septemvri finished in 5th place and claimed the Bulgarian Cup after a dramatic 4:3 win over Lokomotiv Sofia in extra time. The club's stay among the elite lasted only two years, as in 1961 it was relegated to the B PFG, where it remained until 1968.

In 1969, during another period of football reform in Bulgaria, Septemvri was again merged into CSKA Sofia. This unification continued for almost 20 years, until 1988, when the club became independent again and joined the V AFG. In 1993, Septemvri won a promotion to the B PFG. In 1998, the club became the champion of the B PFG and joined the elite for the first time since 1961. It finished in 16th place and was relegated again.

=== 2000s ===
During the 2000–01 season, the club finished in 13th place in the B PFG and was relegated to the V AFG, where it remained until 2008. In March 2008, the club was heavily penalised after a scandalous match against FC Bansko, when coach Rumen Stoyanov ordered his players to leave the field, a serious offence according to Bulgarian Football Union regulations. With an executive decision, the BFU removed Septemvri from the V AFG and placed it in the A OFG, the Sofia Regional Football Group. Despite this setback, the club attained 1st place in the division in the 2008–09 season and qualified for a play-off match for entering the V AFG against FC Novi Iskar. After an emotional 0–0 in regular time, penalty kicks were in order to determine the team going forward. Septemvri lost the penalty shootout 5–4.

=== Chandarov era (2015–present) ===
==== Merge with DIT academy and Pirin Razlog (2015–2017) ====
In 2015, Rumen Chandarov, owner of DIT Sport Academy, one of the best Bulgarian football academies in the last few years, announced that he is the new owner of Septemvri, with the goal of getting the young players to compete in the First Professional Football League of Bulgaria. The team merged with Conegliano German and started the 2015–16 season from V Group. Nikolay Mitov was appointed as a manager of the team. In the end of the 2015 it was decided that the team will give a bigger chance to their U19 players, so most of the players who joined in the season start left and only seven players left, but 18 players joined from the U19 team which was third in the Elite Youth Group by the end of 2015. Some media announced that Chandarov will stop financing the team also due to the fact that he started financing Botev Plovdiv, but Chandarov said that this is not true and the only reason to do this is to make youth players enter the men's football.

On 24 June 2016, Pirin Razlog merged into PFC Septemvri Sofia. From the new season 2016–17 Septemvri will compete in the new Second League, the second division of Bulgarian football. Septemvri also returned in the Bulgarian Cup and drew the Bulgarian First League team Beroe Stara Zagora. They won the match on 21 September 2016 with 2–0, goals scored by Georgi Stoichkov and Petar Tonchev. The team finished their season in Second League in 2nd place, two points behind the winners of the group — Etar and qualified for the Promotion playoffs against elite member Montana. The team won the playoff on 3 June 2017 with a 2–1 final result and returned to the top level after 19 years.

==== Return to Professional leagues (2017–present) ====
On 8 June 2017, Dimitar Vasev was announced as the manager who would lead the team in their return to the First League with Hristo Arangelov, the caretaker manager after Nikolay Mitov, as his first assistant. The team announced that they would play to Vasil Levski National Stadium until their Septemvri Stadium is built. Later, the club owner Rumen Chandarov revealed that the team would play at Bistritsa Stadium after the stadium gained a First League licence, since he didn't want Septemvri to play in front of empty seats. Septemvri's first match was against Dunav Ruse on 17 July and the team lost the match 0–2. Week later Septemvri won their second match against Pirin with Boris Galchev scoring the winning goal. After four defeats in five games, Vasev was released and Nikolay Mitov returned in charge after his release from Levski Sofia. Septemvri finished the half season in 10th place with 23 points after a 2–1 win over Cherno More.

On 20 February 2018, Septemvri's executive director Georgi Markov died aged 46, three years after he suffered a heart attack.

Septemvri secured their place in First League on 15 April 2018 after a 0–2 win over Dunav Ruse and qualified for European play-off quarter-finals.

Septemvri could not avoid relegation in the next season, however, as they were relegated after losing in the relegation playoffs to FC Arda Kardzhali, 0-1. This ended their two year stay in the Bulgarian elite.

Back in the second tier after two seasons in the elite, Septemvri managed to maintain their good form and remained largely within the top three in the Second League, a strong candidate for promotion. The 2019-20 season was eventually not finished, due to the COVID-19 outbreak in Bulgaria. The last matches were played in early March. At that time, Septemvri was second in the league, three points behind CSKA 1948. Septemvri faced the 13th placed team from the First League in a promotion playoff, but lost. On 5 May 2022, after a great second half of season 2021-22, Septemvri secured their return to First League. This achievement was accomplished under the management of Slavko Matić. Septemvri only managed to make a cameo appearance in the elite, suffering immediate relegation back to the Second League for season 2023–24.

== Seasons ==
=== Recent detailed history ===
Results of league and cup competitions by season
Season	League										Bulgarian Cup	Other competitions	Top goalscorer	
Season	Division	Level	P	W	D	L	F	A	Pts	Pos	Bulgarian Cup	Other competitions	Top goalscorer	
2017–18	First League	1	32	12	5	15	32	48	41	10th	Second round		(Bulgaria) Martin Toshev	9
2018–19	First League	1	37	12	6	19	41	62	42	12th ↓	Semi-finals		(France) Chris Gadi	5
2019–20	Second League	2	20	17	1	2	47	19	52	2nd	Round of 16		(Bulgaria) Preslav Yordanov	9
2020–21	Second League	2	30	17	5	8	54	29	56	3rd	Round of 16		(North Macedonia) Mario Ilievski	12
2021–22	Second League	2	36	21	7	8	77	35	70	1st ↑	Quarter-finals		(North Macedonia) Mario Ilievski	15
2022–23	First League	1	35	7	7	21	31	52	28	15th ↓	Round of 16		(Bulgaria) Atanas Kabov	6
2023–24	Second League	2	34	19	8	7	46	26	65	2nd ↑	Round of 32		(Bulgaria) Borislav Marinov	9
2024–25	First League	1	34	14	3	20	42	56	45	12th	First Round		(Bulgaria) Borislav Rupanov	12
2025–26	First League	1									Qualified			
Green marks a season followed by promotion, red a season followed by relegation.

== Honours ==
=== Domestic ===
- First League:
  - 5th place (1): 1959–60
- Bulgarian Cup:
  - Winners (1): 1959–60
- Second League:
  - Winners (4): 1955−56, 1958−59, 1997−98, 2021–22
- Third League:
  - Winners (1): 1992−93
- A Regional Group:
  - Winners (5): 1952, 1989–90, 1990–91, 2008–09, 2009–10

== Crest, Shirt and Kit manufacturer ==
=== Crest history ===
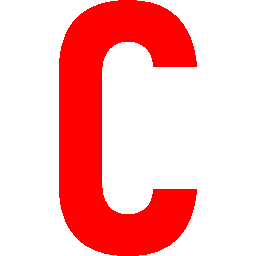
1950–1952

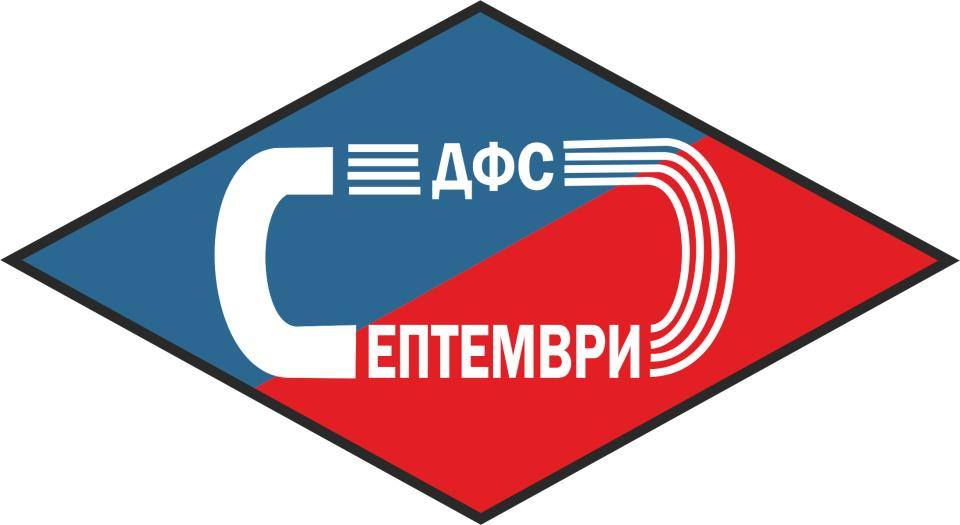
1957–1959

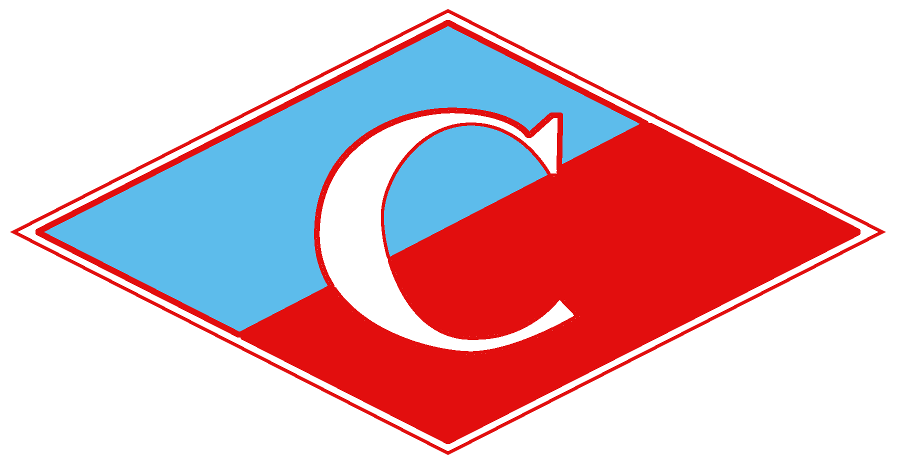
1959–1969

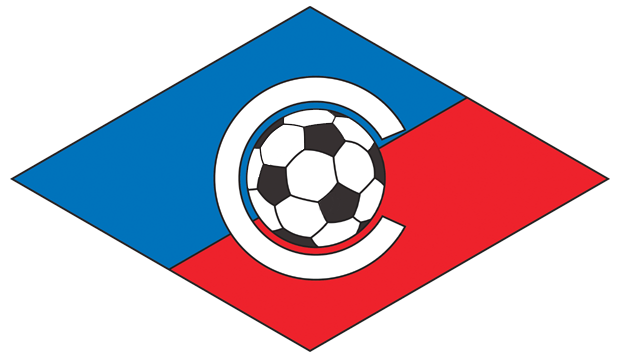
1988–2015

2015–present

=== Kits and manufacturers ===
From 1944 to 1990 team main colour is red with white or blue. From 1990 to 2010 the teams main colour was purple, but in the period between 2001 and 2007 they used white with red colours. From 2011 the team's first kit is dark red.

Period	Kit manufacturer	Shirt partner
1990–1995	(Germany) Adidas	Canel
1995–1997	(Germany) Puma	Canel
1997–1999	(Germany) Puma	Bingbul
1999–2001	(Germany) Reusch	Bingbul
2001–2010	Unknown	None
2010–2011	(England) Mitre	None
2011–2013	(Italy) Givova	None
2013–2015	(Italy) Sportika	None
2015–2017	(Spain) Joma	None
2017–19	(Germany) Uhlsport	Efbet
2019–22	(Germany) Uhlsport	WINBET
2022–	(Germany) Uhlsport	8888.bg

== Players ==
=== Current squad ===
As of 8 September 2026

Note: Flags indicate national team as defined under FIFA eligibility rules; some limited exceptions apply. Players may hold more than one non-FIFA nationality.

No.	Pos.	Nation	Player
1	GK	BUL	Aleksandar Radkov
3	DF	ENG	Sebastian Wade
4	DF	BUL	Martin Hristov
5	MF	BUL	Yoan Baurenski
6	MF	POR	Pedro Ferreira
7	FW	POR	Edney Ribeiro
8	MF	BUL	Bozhidar Penchev
10	MF	BUL	Nikola Iliev (on loan from Botev Plovdiv)
11	MF	BUL	Aleksandar Dzhamov
12	GK	BUL	Vladimir Ivanov
13	DF	BUL	Kubrat Onasci
14	MF	BUL	Aleksandar Vutov
15	DF	BUL	Petar Gospodinov
16	MF	BUL	Venislav Mihaylov

No.	Pos.	Nation	Player
17	MF	MAD	Nicolas Fontaine
18	FW	BRA	Pedro Igor (on loan from Botev Plovdiv)
19	DF	BRA	Pedrinho (on loan from Ferroviário)
20	DF	BUL	Bozhidar Tomovski
21	GK	BUL	Nikolay Krastev
22	MF	BUL	Preslav Georgiev
24	MF	BUL	Zahari Atanasov
25	DF	CRO	Stipe Vulikić (on loan from Levski Sofia)
26	DF	NGR	Valentine Ozornwafor
27	FW	POR	André Liberal
28	MF	BUL	Stoyan Stoichkov
29	FW	HAI	Frantzety Herard
30	MF	BUL	Viktor Dobrev
33	MF	BUL	Galin Ivanov (captain)

For recent transfers, see Transfers winter 2025–26 and Transfers summer 2026.

=== Foreign players ===
Up to twenty foreign nationals can be registered and given a squad number for the first team in the Bulgarian First League, however only five non-EU/EEA nationals can be used during a match day. Those non-EU/EEA nationals with European ancestry can claim citizenship from the nation their ancestors came from. If a player does not have European ancestry he can claim Bulgarian citizenship after playing in Bulgaria for five years.

EU Nationals

- (Croatia) Stipe Vulikić
- (Portugal) André Liberal
- (Portugal) Edney Ribeiro
- (Portugal) Pedro Ferreira

EU Nationals (Dual citizenship)

- (England) (Spain) Sebastian Wade
- (France) (Madagascar) Nicolas Fontaine

Non-EU Nationals

- (Brazil) Pedro Igor
- (Haiti) Frantzety Herard
- (Nigeria) Valentine Ozornwafor

== Notable players ==
Had international caps for their respective countries, held any club record, or had more than 100 league appearances. Players whose name is listed in bold represented their countries.

Bulgaria

- (Bulgaria) **Petar Argirov**
- (Bulgaria) Ivan Arsov
- (Bulgaria) **Valeri Bojinov**
- (Bulgaria) Asen Chandarov
- (Bulgaria) **Zdravko Dimitrov**
- (Bulgaria) **Boris Galchev**
- (Bulgaria) Asen Georgiev
- (Bulgaria) **Atanas Gerov**
- (Bulgaria) Iliya Iliev
- (Bulgaria) **Bozhidar Iskrenov**
- (Bulgaria) **Galin Ivanov**
- (Bulgaria) **Krasimir Koev**
- (Bulgaria) Dimitar Kostadinov
- (Bulgaria) **Manol Manolov**
- (Bulgaria) **Dimitar Milanov**
- (Bulgaria) **Asparuh Nikodimov**
- (Bulgaria) **Plamen Nikolov**
- (Bulgaria) **Miki Orachev**
- (Bulgaria) **Dimitar Largov**
- (Bulgaria) **Pavel Panov**
- (Bulgaria) Mihail Polendakov
- (Bulgaria) Troyan Radulov
- (Bulgaria) Aykut Ramadan
- (Bulgaria) **Georgi Rusev**
- (Bulgaria) **Georgi Sarmov**
- (Bulgaria) **Gavril Stoyanov**
- (Bulgaria) **Dimitar Sheytanov**
- (Bulgaria) Ivan Tilev
- (Bulgaria) Martin Toshev
- (Bulgaria) **Marius Urukov**
- (Bulgaria) **Aleksandar Vasilev**
- (Bulgaria) **Radoslav Vasilev**
- (Bulgaria) **Dimitar Yakimov**
- (Bulgaria) **Vladimir Yonkov**
- (Bulgaria) **Dimitar Yordanov**
- (Bulgaria) **Georgi Yordanov**
- (Bulgaria) **Preslav Yordanov**

Europe

- (France) Chris Gadi
- (Lithuania) **Faustas Steponavičius**
- (North Macedonia) **Darko Glišić**
- (North Macedonia) **Mario Ilievski**
- (North Macedonia) **Vlatko Stojanovski**
- (Kosovo) **Suad Sahiti**

Africa

- (Equatorial Guinea) **Jordan Gutiérrez**
- (Mali) **Alassane Diaby**
- (Mozambique) **Alfons Amade**
- (Nigeria) **Valentine Ozornwafor**
- (South Africa) **Simba Marumo**
- (South Sudan) **Manyumow Achol**

North America

- (Panama) **Martín Morán**

== Appearance records ==
As of 15 April 2026

Most appearances for the club in First League
Rank	Name	Career	Appearances
1	(Bulgaria) Asen Chandarov	2015–2020; 2022; 2024–2025	87
2	(Bulgaria) **Yanko Georgiev**	2017–2019; 2025–	74
3	(Bulgaria) Dimitar Sheytanov	2022–2025	69
4	(Bulgaria) Boris Galchev	2017–2020	65
5	(Bulgaria) **Martin Hristov**	2024–present	59
6	(France) **Bertrand Fourrier**	2024–present	57
7	(Bulgaria) **Georgi Varbanov**	2024–present	52
8	(Bulgaria) **Kubrat Onasci**	2023–present	51
9	(Nigeria) Victor Ochayi	2024–2026	50
10	(France) Chris Gadi	2017–2019	49
–	(Bulgaria) Ivan Tilev	2016–2020	49

Most goals for the club in First League
Rank	Name	Career	Goals
1	(Hungary) Tsvetan Milev	1958–1963	22
2	(France) **Bertrand Fourrier**	2024–	18
—	(Bulgaria) Boris Galchev	2017–2020	14
4	(Bulgaria) Borislav Rupanov	2024–2025	12
—	(France) Chris Gadi	2017–2019	12
6	(Bulgaria) Martin Toshev	2017–2018	11
7	(Bulgaria) Asen Chandarov	2015–2020; 2022; 2024–2025	11
8	(Bulgaria) Dimitar Yakimov	1958–1960	10
9	(Bulgaria) Chavdar Atanasov	1996–1999	7
10	(Germany) Christopher Mandiangu	2018–2019	6
–	(Bulgaria) Atanas Kabov	2021–2023	6

- Players in **bold** are still playing for Septemvri.

== Club officials ==
=== Board of directors ===
Position	Name	Nationality
President	Rumen Chandarov	(Bulgaria)
Sports Director	Kristiyan Dobrev	(Bulgaria)
Administrator	Irina Gorolomova	(Bulgaria)
Housekeeper	Georgi Aleksandrov	(Bulgaria)

=== Current technical body ===
Position	Name	Nationality
Head Coach	Slavko Matić	(Bulgaria)
Assistant Coach	Mladen Stoev	(Bulgaria)
Goalkeeper Coach	Iliya Ivanov	(Bulgaria)
Conditioning Coach	Timur Skorykh	(Ukraine)
Opponent Analyst	Hristijan Hristov	(North Macedonia)
Physical Coach	Georgi Petrov	(Bulgaria)
Physical Coach	Yasen Ekimov	(Bulgaria)
Physiotherapist	Mircho Kraynov	(Bulgaria)
U19 Coach	Dimitar Stoilov	(Bulgaria)
U17 Coach	Hristian Voinov	(Bulgaria)
U15 Coach	Kiril Kirilov	(Bulgaria)

=== Manager history ===
Dates	Name	Honours
1944–1946	(Bulgaria) Dimitar Dimitrov	
1946	(Czech Republic) Milos Strujka	
1947–1948	(Bulgaria) Hristo Nelkov	
1948–1949	(Bulgaria) Anton Kuzmanov	
1951–1953	(Bulgaria) Ivan Radoev	
1953–1957	(Bulgaria) Atanas Dinev	
1957–1959	(Bulgaria) Lozan Kotsev	
1959–1961	(Bulgaria) Trendafil Stankov	1 Bulgarian Cup
1961–1964	(Bulgaria) Sergy Yotsov	
1964–1969	(Bulgaria) Stoyan Petrov	
1969–1988	merged with CSKA Sofia	
1988–1990	(Bulgaria) Alyosha Dimitrov	
1990–1992	(Bulgaria) Angel Rangelov	
1992–1993	(Bulgaria) Pavel Panov	
1993–1994	(Bulgaria) Sergey Todorov	
1994–1995	(Bulgaria) Stefan Grozdanov	
1995	(Bulgaria) Yordan Yordanov	
1995–2000	(Bulgaria) Pavel Panov (2)	
2000–2003	(Bulgaria) Bisser Hazday	
2003–2005	(Bulgaria) Rumen Traykov	
2006–2007	(Bulgaria) Rumen Stoyanov	
2008	(Bulgaria) Ognyan Abadzhiev	
2008–2009	(Bulgaria) Yordan Yordanov	
2009–2010	(Bulgaria) Mihail Mihailov	

Dates	Name	Honours
2010–2013	(Bulgaria) Tsvetan Atanasov	
2013–2015	(Bulgaria) Mihail Mihailov (2)	
2015–2016	(Bulgaria) Nikolay Mitov	
2016	(Bulgaria) Hristo Arangelov	
2016–2017	(Bulgaria) Nikolay Mitov (2)	
2017	(Bulgaria) Hristo Arangelov (2)	
2017	(Bulgaria) Dimitar Vasev	
2017–2018	(Bulgaria) Nikolay Mitov (3)	
2018–2019	(Bulgaria) Hristo Arangelov (3)	
2019–2020	(Bulgaria) Milen Radukanov	
2020–2022	(Bulgaria) Hristo Arangelov (4)	
2022	(Serbia) Slavko Matić	
2022–2023	(Bulgaria) Svetoslav Petrov	
2023–2024	(Bulgaria) Krasimir Balakov	
2024–2025	(Bulgaria) Nikolay Mitov (4)	
2025	(Bulgaria) Stamen Belchev	
2025	(Bulgaria) Mladen Stoev*	
2025–	(Serbia) Slavko Matić (2)	
