= Borislav Marinov =

Bulgarian footballer (born 2005)

Personal information
- Full name: Borislav Rumenov Marinov
- Date of birth: 2 March 2005 (age 21)
- Place of birth: Sofia, Bulgaria
- Height: 1.70 m (5 ft 7 in)
- Position: Winger

Team information
- Current team: Vihren Sandanski
- Number: 77

Youth career
- Septemvri Sofia

Senior career*
Years	Team	Apps	(Gls)
2022–2025	Septemvri Sofia II	42	(22)
2022–2026	Septemvri Sofia	38	(9)
2024	→ Botev Plovdiv II (loan)	19	(3)
2024	→ Botev Plovdiv (loan)	1	(0)
2025–2026	→ Dunav Ruse (loan)	17	(1)
2026–	Vihren Sandanski	0	(0)

International career
2021–2022	Bulgaria U17	13	(3)
2023	Bulgaria U18	3	(1)
2023	Bulgaria U19	6	(2)
2023–	Bulgaria U21	1	(0)
- * Club domestic league appearances and goals as of 24 May 2026

Borislav Marinov (Bulgarian: Борислав Маринов; born 2 March 2005) is a Bulgarian professional footballer who plays as a forward for Vihren Sandanski.

== Career ==
Marinov began his career in the local Septemvri Sofia academy. He completed his professional debut in a league match against Ludogorets Razgrad. After his good season with Septemvri, in July 2024 he was sent on loan to Botev Plovdiv.
