= Bozhidar Penchev =

Bulgarian footballer

Personal information
- Full name: Bozhidar Krasimirov Penchev
- Date of birth: 17 March 2002 (age 24)
- Place of birth: Kardzhali, Bulgaria
- Height: 1.75 m (5 ft 9 in)
- Position: Midfielder

Team information
- Current team: Septemvri Sofia
- Number: 8

Youth career
- Beroe

Senior career*
Years	Team	Apps	(Gls)
2021–2023	Beroe	46	(0)
2023–2025	Hebar	43	(1)
2025–2026	Botev Vratsa	14	(0)
2026	→ Yantra Gabrovo (loan)	14	(0)
2026–	Septemvri Sofia	0	(0)

International career
2022–2023	Bulgaria U21	4	(0)
- * Club domestic league appearances and goals as of 11 June 2026

Bozhidar Krasimirov Penchev (Bulgarian: Божидар Красимиров Пенчев; born 17 March 2002) is a Bulgarian professional footballer who plays as a midfielder for First League club Septemvri Sofia.

== Career ==
On 7 January 2021, Penchev signed his first professional contract with Beroe. In June 2026, he joined Septemvri Sofia.
