= Aykut Ramadan =

Bulgarian footballer

Personal information
- Full name: Aykut Sunay Ramadan
- Date of birth: 10 July 1998 (age 28)
- Place of birth: Sofia, Bulgaria
- Height: 1.78 m (5 ft 10 in)
- Position: Forward

Team information
- Current team: Vihren Sandanski
- Number: 20

Youth career
- 2006–2015: CSKA Sofia
- 2015: Litex Lovech

Senior career*
Years	Team	Apps	(Gls)
2015	Litex Lovech II	1	(0)
2016–2017	CSKA Sofia	4	(0)
2016–2017	CSKA Sofia II	3	(0)
2016	→ Tsarsko Selo Sofia (loan)	7	(1)
2017–2018	Minyor Pernik	13	(1)
2018	Montana	7	(0)
2019	CSKA 1948	4	(0)
2019–2020	Lokomotiv GO	19	(3)
2020–2021	Sportist Svoge	22	(5)
2021–2024	Septemvri Sofia	81	(9)
2024	Etar Veliko Tarnovo	14	(4)
2025	Slavia Sofia	5	(0)
2025–2026	Dobrudzha	30	(1)
2026	Beroe Stara Zagora	4	(2)
2026–	Vihren Sandanski	3	(2)

International career^{‡}
2016	Bulgaria U18		
- * Club domestic league appearances and goals as of 21 October 2026 ‡ National team caps and goals as of 21:37, 25 March 2022 (UTC)

Aykut Sunay Ramadan (Bulgarian: Айкут Сунай Рамадан; born 10 July 1998) is a Bulgarian footballer who plays as a forward for Vihren Sandanski.

== Career ==
Ramadan joined the CSKA Sofia academy in 2006. In 2015 he moved to Litex Lovech, only to return in CSKA in January 2016. In December 2018, it was announced that he had joined CSKA 1948. In July 2020, although it was reported that he was going to join Minyor Pernik, he signed with Sportist Svoge instead.On 27 May 2021, he signed with Septemvri Sofia. He had a crucial role in the team that won promotion to the First League in 2022.
