= Nikolay Mitov =

Bulgarian footballer and manager

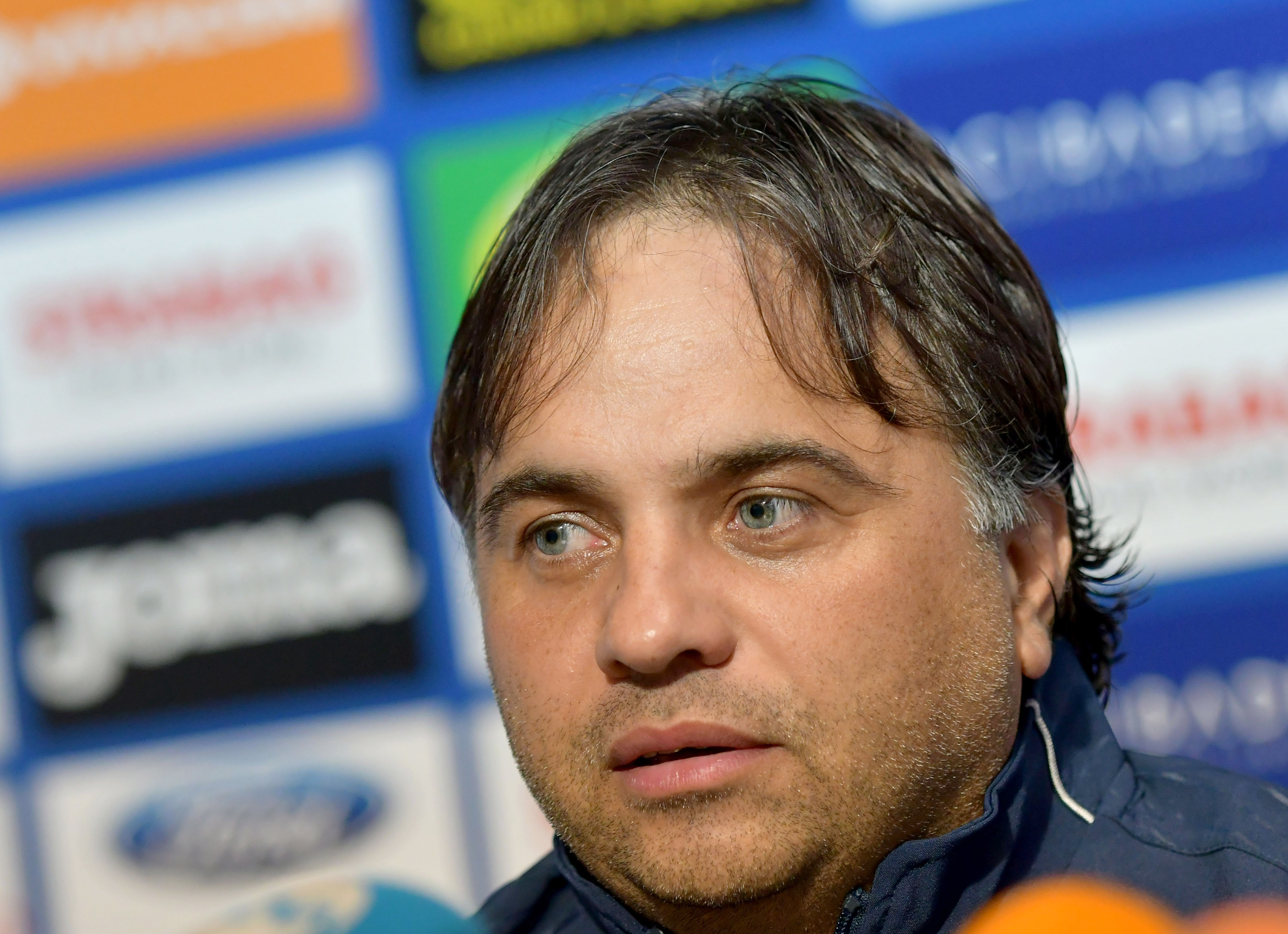

Personal information
- Full name: Nikolay Angelov Mitov
- Date of birth: 18 March 1972 (age 54)
- Place of birth: Smolyan, Bulgaria
- Position: Forward

Team information
- Current team: Hebar Pazardzhik (manager)

Senior career*
Years	Team	Apps	(Gls)
1990–1992	Hebar Pazardzhik		
1992–1993	Levski Sofia	7	(1)
1993–1995	Akademik Sofia		
1995–1998	1. FC Magdeburg	12	(2)
1998–2000	Minyor Pernik		
2000–2001	Holstein Kiel		

Managerial career
- 2013: Levski Sofia
- 2013–2014: Montana
- 2015: Septemvri Sofia
- 2016: Pirin Razlog
- 2016–2017: Septemvri Sofia
- 2017: Levski Sofia
- 2017–2018: Septemvri Sofia
- 2018–2022: Hebar Pazardzhik
- 2023–2024: Montana
- 2024–2025: Septemvri Sofia
- 2025–: Hebar Pazardzhik
- * Club domestic league appearances and goals

Nikolay Angelov Mitov (born 18 March 1972) is a Bulgarian football manager and former player.

== Playing career ==
Mitov has played for Bulgarian teams Hebar Pazardzhik, Minyor Pernik and Levski Sofia and German teams 1. FC Magdeburg and Holstein Kiel. With Levski he played in seven matches and has scored one goal.

== Managerial career ==
From 12 April 2013 he is the coach of Levski Sofia after replacing Ilian Iliev. Before that he was assistant-manager in the team. Under his managerial tenure, "Levski" secured crucial victories against major rivals CSKA Sofia and Ludogorets Razgrad, but the team failed to win the A PFG title after being held to a 1:1 draw with Slavia Sofia in the last round of the league. Mitov parted ways with the "blues" on 12 July 2013, following the team's elimination by Kazakh club Irtysh Pavlodar in the UEFA Europa League.

In early December 2013, Mitov was announced as the new manager of PFC Montana in the B PFG on a contract until 30 June 2014. He was released from his duties in May 2014 after being unable to secure the team's promotion to the A PFG. Mitov was appointed as manager of Botev Plovdiv on 30 August 2016, but decided to resign a few hours later due to a hostile reception from the fans.

On 2 March 2017, he was appointed as manager of Levski Sofia, replacing Elin Topuzakov. After five months of stay, PFC Levski and Nikolay Mitov decided to split by mutual agreement due to poor results. The club thanked the coach for all his work as head of the team and for his responsibility to carry out his duties despite the poor performance of the team. Mr. Mitov received the possibility of one-month specialization in Spain.

Instead he returned in charge of Septemvri Sofia after the bad start of the team under Dimitar Vasev's tenure. In June 2023, Mitov was once again appointed as manager of Montana.

== Honours ==
Levski Sofia

- Bulgarian A Group: 1992–93

Hebar Pazardzhik

- Bulgarian South-West V Group: 2018–19
- Bulgarian Second League: 2021–22
