= Umaro Baldé (footballer, born 1999) =

Bissau-Guinean footballer (born 1999)

Personal information
- Date of birth: 23 June 1999 (age 27)
- Place of birth: Amadora, Portugal
- Height: 1.81 m (5 ft 11 in)
- Position: Winger

Team information
- Current team: Slavia Sofia
- Number: 27

Youth career
- 2007–2009: Odivelas
- 2009–2011: Foot 21
- 2011–2016: Carlos Rodrigues Foot
- 2011–2016: Sporting CP
- 2016–2017: Sacavenense
- 2017–2018: Tondela
- 2018–2021: Marítimo

Senior career*
Years	Team	Apps	(Gls)
2019–2021	Marítimo B	16	(1)
2021–2023	Vilafranquense	29	(1)
2022	→ Torreense (loan)	11	(2)
2023	Varzim	11	(1)
2023–2024	Fafe	4	(0)
2023–2024	→ 1º Dezembro (loan)	19	(1)
2024–2025	Oliveira do Hospital	13	(2)
2025	Cinfães	7	(3)
2026	Montana	14	(1)
2026–	Slavia Sofia	0	(0)

International career^{‡}
2015	Portugal U16	1	(0)
2022–	Guinea-Bissau	1	(0)
- * Club domestic league appearances and goals as of 10 June 2026 ‡ National team caps and goals as of 26 September 2022

Umaro Baldé (born 23 June 1999) is a professional footballer who plays as a winger for Bulgarian First League club Slavia Sofia. Born in Portugal, he represents Guinea-Bissau at international level.

== Early life ==
Umaro Baldé started playing youth football with Odivelas, moving to the Sporting CP Youth Academy in 2011. He then joined Sacavenense and Tondela for the remainder of his youth career. In 2018, he joined Marítimo U23.

== Club career ==
In July 2018, he joined Marítimo B in the Campeonato de Portugal, also spending time with their U23 side.

In July 2021, he joined Vilafranquense in Liga Portugal 2. In January 2022, he was loaned to Liga 3 side Torreense for the remainder of the season. With Torreense, he scored twice in 11 appearances, helping the club earn promotion to the second tier.

In January 2023, he joined Varzim in Liga 3. On April 30, he scored in a 1–0 victory over Montalegre, earning man of the match honours.

On 31 July 2023, Baldé signed for Liga 3 side AD Fafe. In September 2023, Baldé was sent on loan to fellow Liga 3 side 1º Dezembro until the end of the season.

== International career ==
He was called up to the Guinea-Bissau national team for the first time in September 2022. He made his debut in a friendly against Martinique.
