= Pedro Ferreira (footballer, born 2000) =

Portuguese footballer

Personal information
- Full name: Pedro Tavares Ferreira
- Date of birth: 20 March 2000 (age 26)
- Place of birth: Oliveira de Azeméis, Portugal
- Height: 1.83 m (6 ft 0 in)
- Position: Midfielder

Team information
- Current team: Septemvri Sofia
- Number: 6

Youth career
- 2008–2019: Oliveirense

Senior career*
Years	Team	Apps	(Gls)
2019–2021	Oliveirense	11	(0)
2021–2022	Canelas	9	(0)
2022–2024	Gondomar		
2024–2026	Paredes	41	(1)
2026–	Septemvri Sofia	0	(0)
- * Club domestic league appearances and goals as of 21:17, 12 June 2026 (UTC)

Pedro Tavares Ferreira (born 20 March 2000) is a Portuguese professional footballer who plays as a midfielder for Bulgarian First League club Septemvri Sofia.

== Football career ==
He made his professional debut for Oliveirense on 12 September 2020 in the Liga Portugal 2.
